= Hungary men's national handball team =

Hungary

Information
- Nickname: Magyars
- Association: Hungarian Handball Federation
- Coach: László Sótonyi
- Assistant coach: Haris Porobić; Miguel Velasco
- Most caps: Péter Kovács (323)
- Most goals: Péter Kovács (1797)

Colours
1st	2nd	3rd

Results

Summer Olympics
- Appearances: 9 (First in 1936)
- Best result: 4th (1936, 1980, 1988, 2004, 2012)

World Championship
- Appearances: 23 (First in 1958)
- Best result: (silver) 2nd (1986)

European Championship
- Appearances: 15 (First in 1994)
- Best result: 5th (2024)
- Last updated on Unknown.

Hungary men's national handball team
Medal record

World Championship
Silver medal – second place	1986 Switzerland	

The Hungary national handball team is administered by the Hungarian Handball Federation.

== Competitive record ==
Champions Runners-up Third place Fourth place

=== Olympic Games ===
==== Competitive record at the Olympic Games ====
Games	Round	Position	Pld	W	D	L	GF	GA	GD
(Germany) 1936 Berlin	Final round	4th /6	5	1	0	4	25	64	−39
Not held from 1948 to 1968
(West Germany) 1972 Munich	Main round	8th /16	6	2	0	4	110	101	+9
(Canada) 1976 Montreal	Group stage	6th /11	5	2	0	3	111	103	+8
(Soviet Union) 1980 Moscow	Bronze medal match	4th /12	6	3	2	1	114	108	+6
(United States) 1984 Los Angeles	did not participate								
(South Korea) 1988 Seoul	Bronze medal match	4th /12	6	3	0	3	125	120	+5
(Spain) 1992 Barcelona	Group stage	7th /12	6	3	0	3	125	127	−2
(United States) 1996 Atlanta	did not qualify								
(Australia) 2000 Sydney	did not qualify								
(Greece) 2004 Athens	Bronze medal match	4th /12	8	5	0	3	219	210	+9
(China) 2008 Beijing	did not qualify								
(United Kingdom) 2012 London	Bronze medal match	4th /12	8	3	0	5	200	221	−21
(Brazil) 2016 Rio de Janeiro	did not qualify								
(Japan) 2020 Tokyo	did not qualify								
(France) 2024 Paris	Preliminary round	10th /12	5	1	0	5	137	138	−1
(United States) 2028 Los Angeles	Future event								
(Australia) 2032 Brisbane	Future event								
Total	Qualified: 9/16		55	23	2	30	1,166	1,192	−26

==== Competitive record in pre-Olympic qualifying rounds ====
Year	Pld	W	D	L	GF	GA	GD	Qual
(Germany) 1936	Qualified							yes
(West Germany) 1972	8th at the 1970 World Champ							yes
(Canada) 1976	4	4	0	0	82	57	+25	yes
(Soviet Union) 1980	9th at the 1978 World Champ							yes
(United States) 1984	Winner of the 1983 B World Champ							boycott
(Korea) 1988	2nd at the 1986 World Champ							yes
(Spain) 1992	6th at the 1990 World Champ							yes
(United States) 1996	17th at the 1995 World Champ							no
(Australia) 2000	11th at the 1999 World Champ							no
(Greece) 2004	6th at the 2003 World Champ							yes
(China) 2008	Couldn't participate in qualification							no
(United Kingdom) 2012	3	2	0	1	81	79	+2	yes
(Brazil) 2016	Couldn't participate in qualification							no
(Japan) 2020	Couldn't participate in qualification							no
(France) 2024	3	2	0	1	88	80	+8	yes
(United States) 2028	To be determined							
(Australia) 2032	To be determined							
Total	10	8	0	2	251	216	+35	9/15

=== World Championship ===
==== Competitive record at the World Championship ====
Year	Round	Position	Pld	W	D	L	GF	GA	GD
(Germany) 1938	did not enter								
(Sweden) 1954	did not enter								
(East Germany) 1958	Main round	7th /16	6	2	1	3	106	119	−13
(West Germany) 1961	did not qualify								
(Czechoslovakia) 1964	Main round	8th /16	6	3	0	3	93	90	+3
(Sweden) 1967	Quarter-finals	8th /16	6	2	0	4	126	130	−4
(France) 1970	Quarter-finals	8th /16	6	3	0	3	95	84	+9
(East Germany) 1974	Main round	7th /16	6	3	0	3	114	95	+19
(Denmark) 1978	Group stage	9th /16	6	4	1	1	135	117	+18
(West Germany) 1982	Main round	9th /16	7	2	4	1	152	141	+9
(Switzerland) 1986	Final	(silver) /16	7	6	0	1	167	151	+16
(Czechoslovakia) 1990	Main round	6th /16	7	4	1	2	151	147	+4
(Sweden) 1993	Main round	11th /16	7	2	0	5	166	161	+5
(Iceland) 1995	Group stage	17th /24	5	1	0	4	119	121	−2
(Japan) 1997	Bronze medal match	4th /24	9	6	0	3	220	206	+14
(Egypt) 1999	Round of 16	11th /24	6	3	0	3	157	136	+21
(France) 2001	did not qualify								
(Portugal) 2003	Main round	6th /24	9	4	0	5	273	259	+14
(Tunisia) 2005	did not qualify								
(Germany) 2007	Main round	9th /24	8	5	0	3	225	224	+1
(Croatia) 2009	Main round	6th /24	9	5	1	3	254	227	+27
(Sweden) 2011	Main round	7th /24	9	6	0	3	254	253	+1
(Spain) 2013	Quarter-finals	8th /24	7	4	0	3	200	167	+33
(Qatar) 2015	did not qualify								
(France) 2017	Quarter-finals	7th /24	7	3	0	4	202	194	+8
(Denmark) (Germany) 2019	Main round	10th /24	8	3	2	3	225	219	+6
(Egypt) 2021	Quarter-finals	5th /32	7	5	0	2	226	193	+33
(Poland) (Sweden) 2023	Quarter-finals	8th /32	9	4	0	5	266	283	-17
(Croatia) (Denmark) (Norway) 2025	Quarter-finals	8th /32	7	4	1	2	216	194	+22
(Germany) 2027	did not qualify								
(France) (Germany) 2029	to be determined								
(Denmark) (Iceland) (Norway) 2031	to be determined								
Total	23/32	0 Titles	164	84	11	69	4142	3911	+231

==== Competitive record in pre-World Championship qualifying rounds ====
Year	Pld	W	D	L	GF	GA	GD	Qual
(Germany) 1938	did not enter							N/A
(Sweden) 1954	1	0	0	1	8	13	−5	no
(East Germany) 1958	Qualified							yes
(West Germany) 1961	2	1	0	1	29	31	−2	no
(Czechoslovakia) 1964	2	2	0	0	39	30	+9	yes
(Sweden) 1967	4	3	1	0	90	55	+35	yes
(France) 1970	2	2	0	0	52	26	+26	yes
(East Germany) 1974	6th at the 1972 Olympics							yes
(Denmark) 1978	6th at the 1976 Olympics							yes
(West Germany) 1982	4th at the 1980 Olympics							yes
(Switzerland) 1986	5th at the 1985 World Champ B							yes
(Czechoslovakia) 1990	4th at the 1988 Olympics							yes
(Sweden) 1993	6th at the 1990 World Champ							yes
(Iceland) 1995	7th at the 1994 Euro							yes
(Japan) 1997	6	5	0	1	169	142	+17	yes
(Egypt) 1999	6	4	0	2	157	131	+26	yes
(France) 2001	8	5	0	3	199	160	+39	no
(Portugal) 2003	8	8	0	0	244	161	+83	yes
(Tunisia) 2005	2	1	0	1	54	56	−2	no
(Germany) 2007	2	2	0	0	65	52	+13	yes
(Croatia) 2009	2	2	0	0	54	49	+5	yes
(Sweden) 2011	2	1	0	1	53	52	+1	yes
(Spain) 2013	2	1	0	1	54	52	+2	yes
(Qatar) 2015	2	1	0	1	51	54	−3	no
(France) 2017	2	2	0	0	56	50	+6	yes
(Denmark) (Germany) 2019	2	1	0	1	51	50	+1	yes
(Egypt) 2021	Qualified							yes
(Poland) (Sweden) 2023	2	2	0	0	64	54	+10	yes
(Croatia) (Denmark) (Norway) 2025	2	2	0	0	69	49	+20	yes
(Germany) 2027	2	1	0	1	60	61	-1	no
(France) (Germany) 2029
(Denmark) (Iceland) (Norway) 2031

=== Euro Tournaments ===
All teams in these tournaments are European, all World and Olympic Champions, and top 7 from World Championships and Olympics were participating. They were mini European championships at the time.

EURO World Cup tournament Sweden

- 1974 (Sweden) : 7th place
- 1979 (Sweden) : 4th place
- 1988 (Sweden) : 6th place
- 1992 (Sweden) : 7th place

EURO Super Cup tournament Germany

- 1987 (Germany) : 4th place

=== European Championship ===
==== Competitive record at the European Championship ====
Year	Round	Position	Pld	W	D*	L	GF	GA	GD
(Portugal) 1994	Group stage	7th /12	6	3	0	3	128	131	−3
(Spain) 1996	Group stage	10th /12	6	1	1	4	144	158	−14
(Italy) 1998	Group stage	6th /12	6	3	0	3	145	154	−9
(Croatia) 2000	did not qualify								
(Sweden) 2002	did not qualify								
(Slovenia) 2004	Main round	9th /16	6	2	2	2	164	169	−5
(Switzerland) 2006	Group stage	13th /16	3	1	0	2	84	89	−5
(Norway) 2008	Main round	8th /16	6	3	1	2	176	173	+3
(Austria) 2010	Group stage	14th /16	3	0	1	2	80	96	−16
(Serbia) 2012	Main round	8th /16	6	1	3	2	156	161	−5
(Denmark) 2014	Main round	8th /16	6	1	2	3	159	165	−6
(Poland) 2016	Main round	12th /16	6	1	0	5	142	166	−24
(Croatia) 2018	Group stage	14th /16	3	0	0	3	77	92	−15
(Austria) (Norway) (Sweden) 2020	Main round	9th /24	7	3	1	3	176	189	−13
(Hungary) (Slovakia) 2022	Group stage	15th /24	3	1	0	2	89	92	−3
(Germany) 2024	Fifth place game	5th /24	8	5	0	3	228	224	+4
(Denmark) (Norway) (Sweden) 2026	Main round	10th /24	7	2	2	3	202	194	+8
(Portugal) (Spain) (Switzerland) 2028	to be determined								
(Czech Republic) (Denmark) (Poland) 2030	to be determined								
(France) (Germany) 2032	to be determined								
Total	15/20	0 Titles	82	27	13	42	2150	2253	−103

==== Competitive record in pre-European Championship qualifying rounds ====
Year	Pld	W	D	L	GF	GA	GD	Qual
(Portugal) 1994	8	6	0	2	182	142	+40	yes
(Spain) 1996	6	3	1	2	156	149	+7	yes
(Italy) 1998	6	4	1	1	147	138	+9	yes
(Croatia) 2000	2	0	0	2	52	59	−7	no
(Sweden) 2002	2	0	2	0	46	46	0	no
(Slovenia) 2004	2	1	0	1	64	62	+2	yes
(Switzerland) 2006	8	8	0	0	297	208	+89	yes
(Norway) 2008	2	2	0	0	59	53	+6	yes
(Austria) 2010	8	6	0	2	241	179	+62	yes
(Serbia) 2012	6	6	0	0	171	130	+41	yes
(Denmark) 2014	6	3	2	2	161	153	+8	yes
(Poland) 2016	6	6	0	0	178	151	+27	yes
(Croatia) 2018	6	4	1	1	174	156	+18	yes
(Austria) (Norway) (Sweden) 2020	6	5	1	0	161	135	+26	yes
(Hungary) (Slovakia) 2022	Qualified as host							yes
(Germany) 2024	6	5	0	1	226	168	+58	yes
(Denmark) (Norway) (Sweden) 2026	6	5	1	0	203	158	+45	yes
(Portugal) (Spain) (Switzerland) 2028	To be determined							
(Czech Republic) (Denmark) (Poland) 2030	To be determined							
(France) (Germany) 2032	To be determined							

*Denotes draws include knockout matches decided on penalties.
**Gold background color indicates that the tournament was won. Red border color indicates tournament was held on home soil.

== Team ==
=== Current squad ===
The squad for the 2026 European Men's Handball Championship.

Head coach: (Spain) Chema Rodríguez

No.	Pos.	Name	Date of birth (age)	Height	App.	Goals	Club
1	GK	Arián Andó	29 January 1999 (age 27)	1.90 m	11	0	(Hungary) MOL-Tatabánya KC
2	P	Adrián Sipos	8 March 1990 (age 36)	1.98 m	109	50	(Germany) MT Melsungen
7	LW	Bendegúz Bóka	2 October 1993 (age 33)	1.95 m	113	269	(Hungary) Balatonfüredi KSE
9	LB	Andrej Pergel	18 June 2003 (age 23)	1.97 m	9	15	(Spain) CB Ciudad de Logroño
11	LB	Patrik Ligetvári	13 February 1996 (age 30)	2.05 m	133	100	(Hungary) Veszprém KC
13	P	Tamás Papp	11 November 2002 (age 23)	1.83 m	4	9	(Hungary) MOL-Tatabánya KC
18	LW	Bence Krakovszki	9 July 2002 (age 24)	1.87 m	30	46	(Hungary) MOL-Tatabánya KC
24	CB	Gergő Fazekas	31 October 2003 (age 23)	1.91 m	59	122	(Poland) Wisła Płock
26	RW	Pedro Rodríguez Álvarez	22 August 1990 (age 36)	1.93 m	52	127	(Hungary) MOL-Tatabánya KC
30	LB	Zoltán Szita	10 February 1998 (age 28)	1.96 m	104	259	(Poland) Wisła Płock
32	GK	Kristóf Palasics	19 April 2002 (age 24)	1.99 m	43	2	(Germany) MT Melsungen
39	LB	Richárd Bodó	13 March 1993 (age 33)	2.03 m	139	396	(Hungary) OTP Bank-Pick Szeged
43	RB	Zoran Ilić	2 January 2002 (age 24)	1.97 m	62	119	(Poland) Wisła Płock
45	P	Miklós Rosta	14 February 1999 (age 27)	2.03 m	93	257	(Romania) CS Dinamo București
61	GK	László Bartucz	5 November 1991 (age 35)	1.97 m	44	0	(Germany) MT Melsungen
71	RB	Máté Ónodi-Jánoskúti	17 June 2002 (age 24)	1.93 m	26	50	(France) USAM Nîmes Gard
72	CB	Péter Lukács	30 July 2002 (age 24)	1.90 m	14	4	(Norway) Elverum Håndball
77	CB	Egon Hanusz	25 September 1997 (age 29)	1.77 m	73	108	(France) Cesson Rennes MHB
91	RW	Bence Imre	15 October 2002 (age 24)	1.85 m	47	230	(Germany) THW Kiel
93	RW	Benjámin Szilágyi	18 May 2003 (age 23)	1.89 m	2	3	(Hungary) OTP Bank-Pick Szeged

=== Extended squad / recent call-ups ===
No.	Pos.	Name	Date of birth (age)	Height	App.	Goals	Club
4	LW	Levente Hári	20 September 1999 (age 27)	1.80 m	0	0	(Hungary) Győri ETO-UNI FKC
8	LW	Máté Gáncs-Pető	2 October 2007 (age 19)	1.83 m	0	0	(Hungary) One Veszprém
10	RW	Zsolt Krakovszki	9 July 2002 (age 24)	1.88 m	21	37	(Hungary) Győri ETO-UNI FKC
15	CB	Mátyás Győri	2 February 1997 (age 29)	1.92 m	27	54	(Hungary) Ferencvárosi TC
17	LB	Bence Nagy	5 July 1995 (age 31)	1.96 m	19	26	(Hungary) Ferencvárosi TC
21	GK	Benedek Nagy	17 November 2001 (age 24)	1.95 m	1	0	(Germany) HBW Balingen-Weilstetten
22	RB	Péter Tóth	28 June 2000 (age 26)	1.83 m	3	4	(Hungary) Ferencvárosi TC
23	RB	Dominik Máthé	1 April 1999 (age 27)	2.01 m	45	156	(Norway) Elverum Håndball
27	P	Bence Bánhidi	9 February 1995 (age 31)	2.07 m	131	403	(Hungary) OTP Bank-Pick Szeged
31	P	Bence Szűcs	25 May 1999 (age 27)	2.06 m	8	8	(France) US Dunkerque HB
34	P	Miklós Karai	22 September 2002 (age 24)	1.95 m	0	0	(Hungary) Ferencvárosi TC
35	LB	Máté Fazekas	14 September 2006 (age 20)	1.97 m	0	0	(Hungary) OTP Bank-Pick Szeged
49	CB	Dániel Sztraka	24 November 2003 (age 22)	1.81 m	0	0	(Hungary) MOL-Tatabánya KC
62	GK	Kristóf Győri	25 June 2000 (age 26)	1.85 m	0	0	(Hungary) Ferencvárosi TC
90	CB	Levente Tóth	2 January 2005 (age 21)	1.87 m	0	0	(Hungary) NEKA

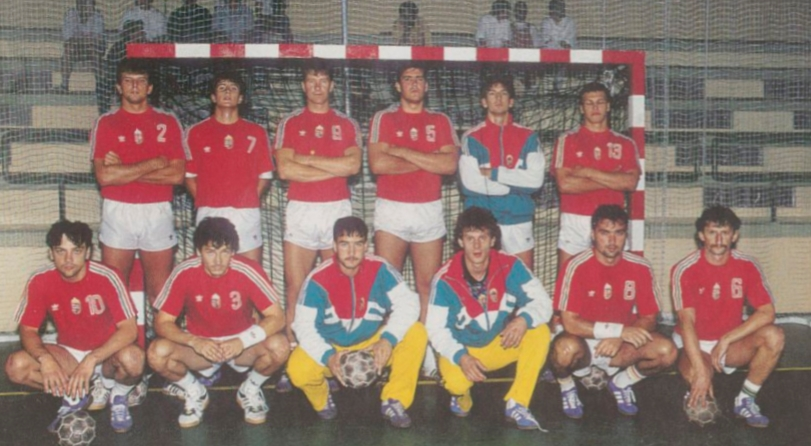
National team players in 1992

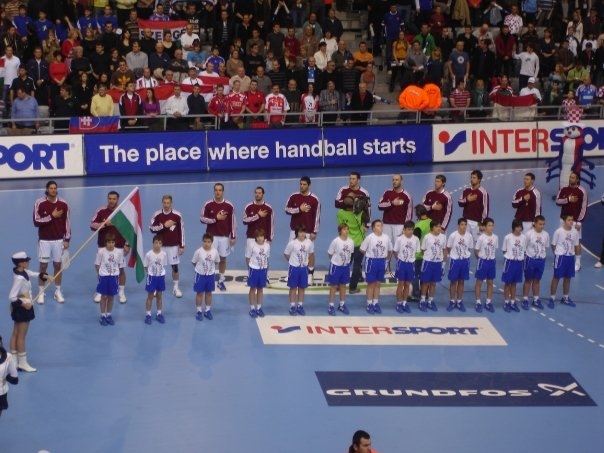
Hungarian national team in 2009 World Men's Handball Championship

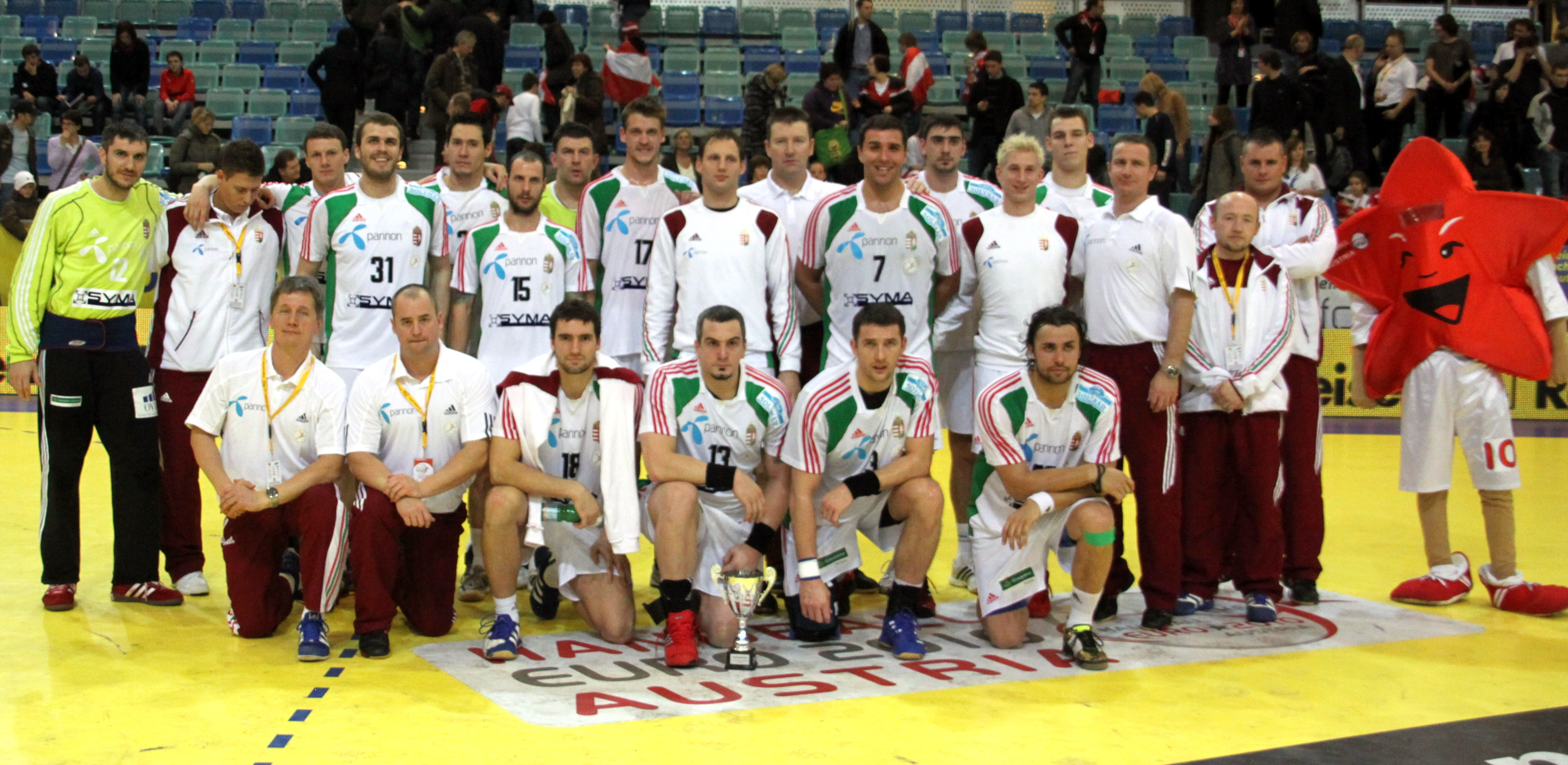
Hungarian national team in 2010

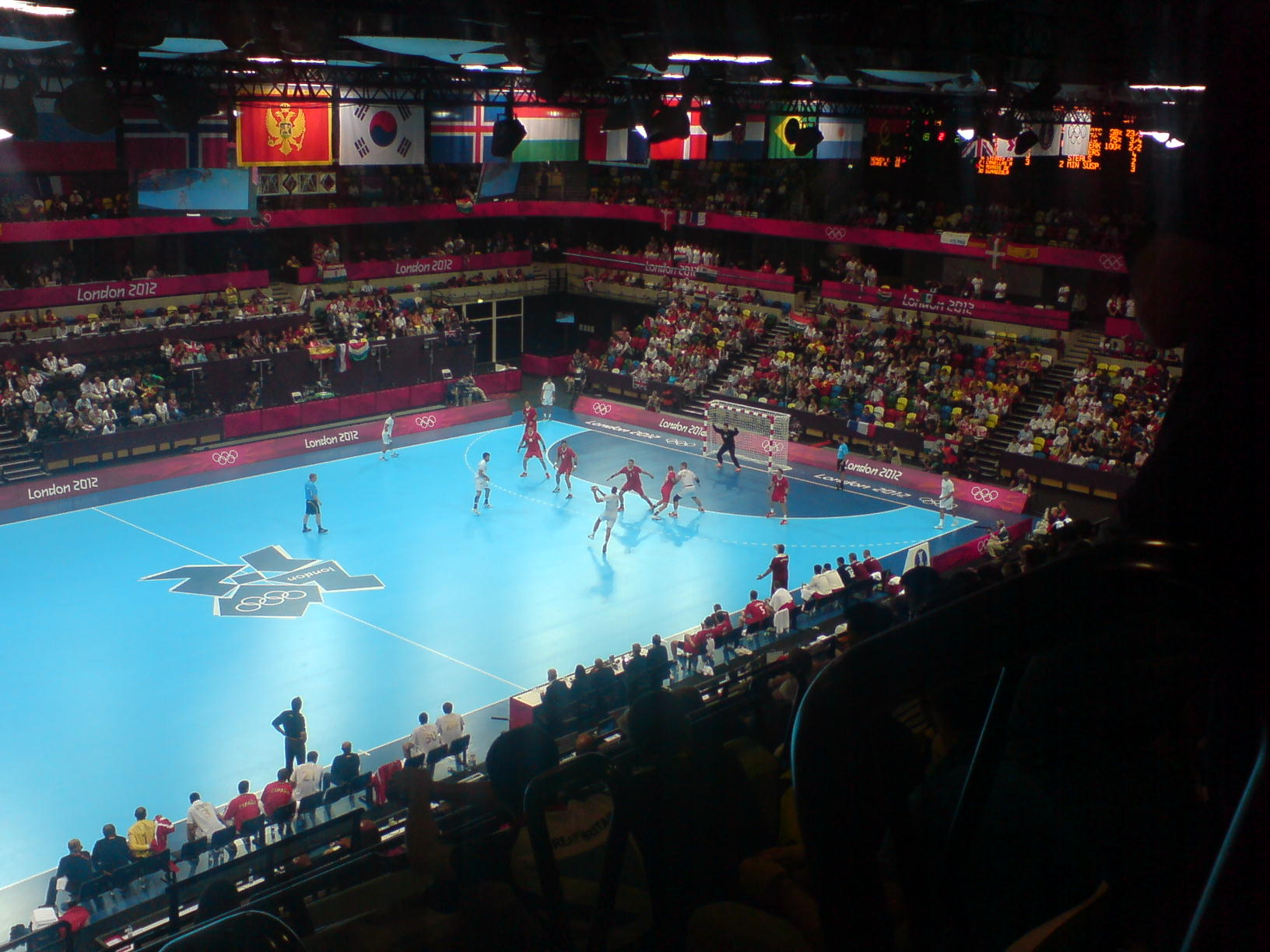
Hungarian national team in 2012 Summer Olympics against Spain

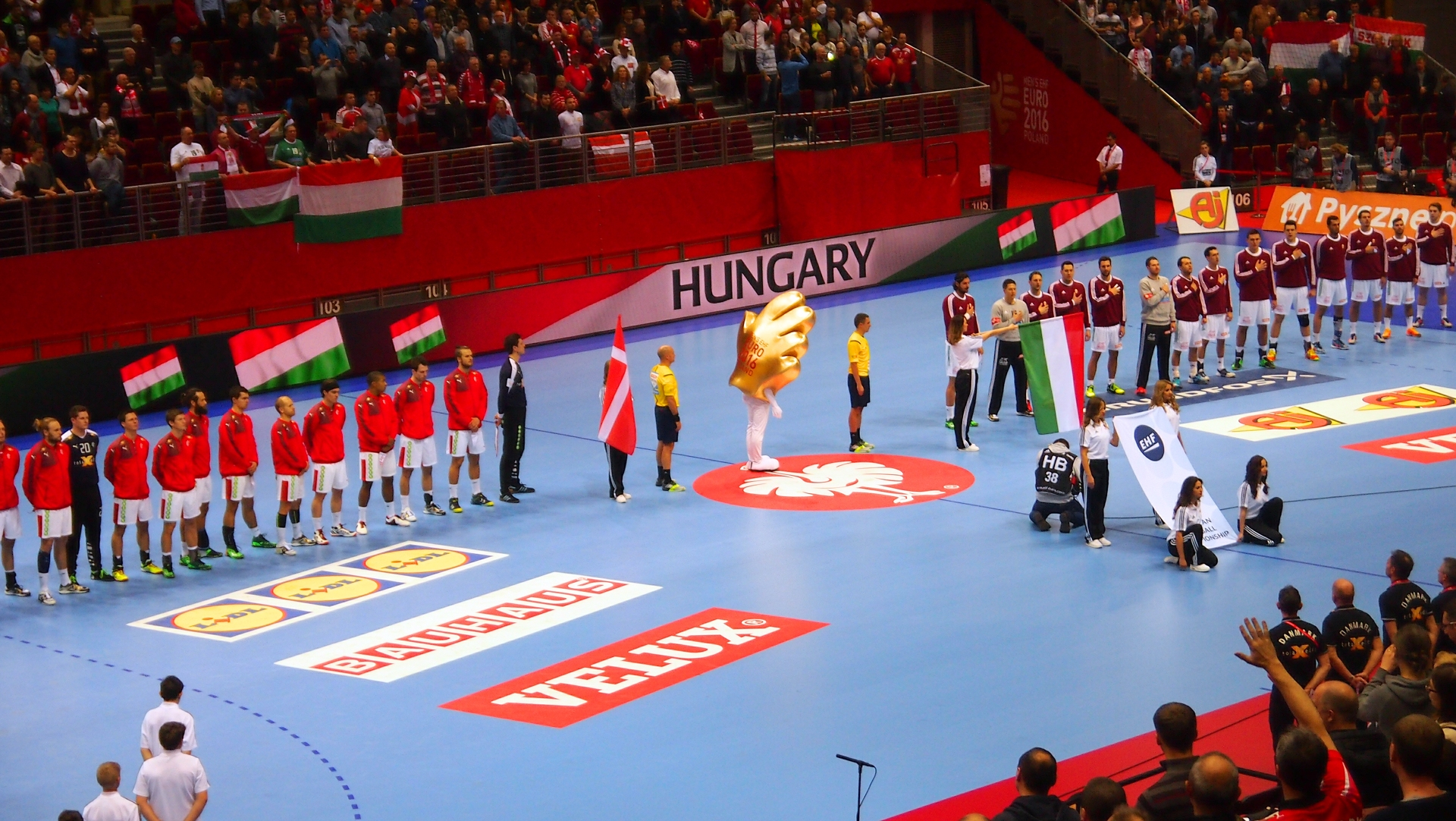
Hungarian national team in 2016 European Championship against Denmark

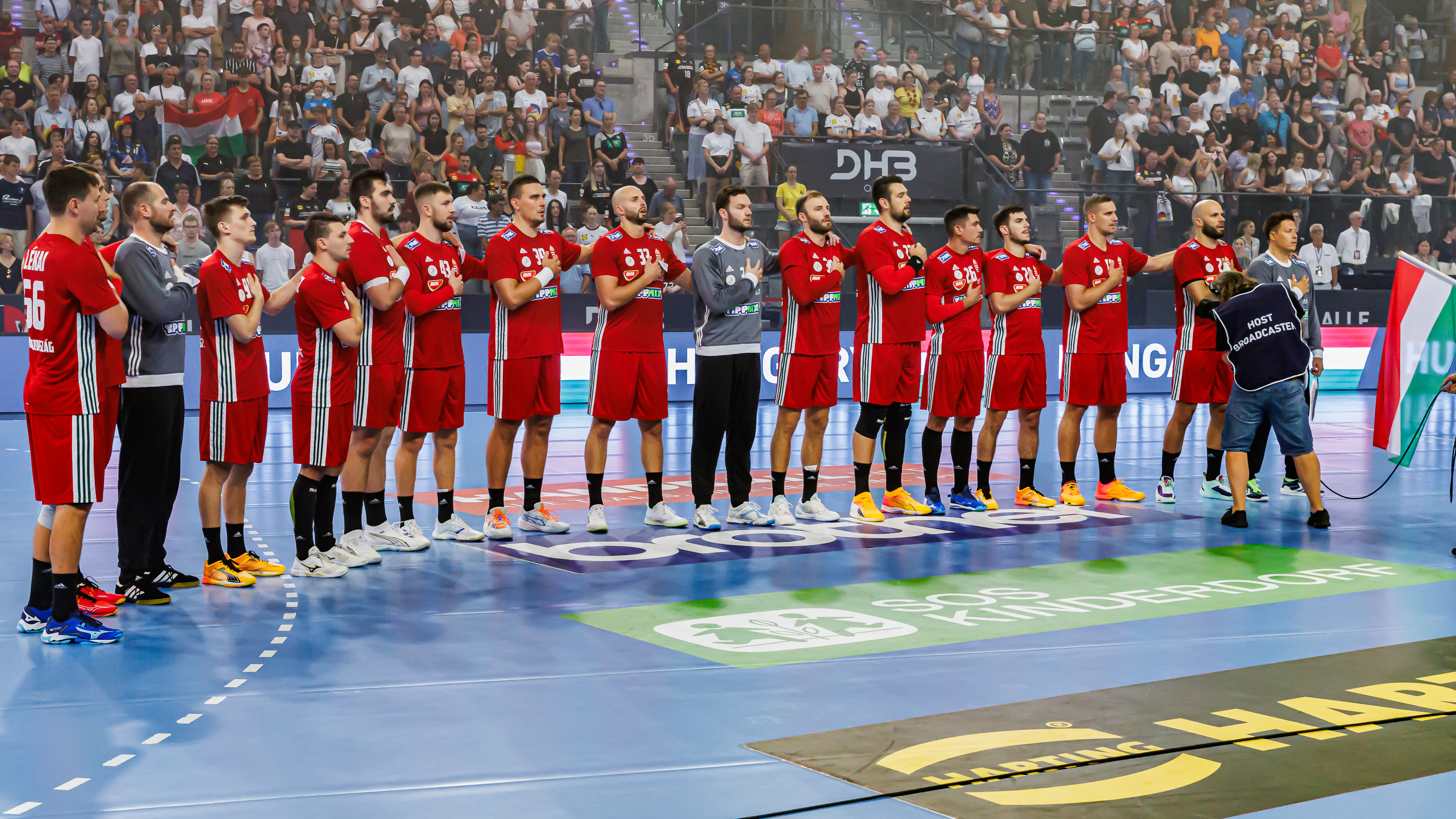
National team players sing anthem in friendly match of 2024 against Germany

=== Past squads ===
1936 Olympic Games (4th place)

Antal Benda, Ferenc Cziráki, Sándor Cséfai, Miklós Fodor, Lőrinc Galgóczi, János Koppány, Lajos Kutasi, Tibor Máté, Imre Páli, Ferenc Rákosi, Endre Salgó, István Serényi, Sándor Szomori, Gyula Takács, Antal Újváry, Ferenc Velkey.

1958 World Championship (7th place)

Jenő Balázs, István Bányai, Ottó Bencsik, József Berendi, Rudolf Bolla, Mihály Faludi, Sándor Fekete, Ottó Hetényi, Jenő Horváth, Miklós Kele, Tibor Kőszegi, Gábor Lengyel, Béla Schvajda, Ferenc Som, Károly Töltő, István Vajna.

Coach: Sándor Cséfai

1964 World Championship (8th place)

János Adorján, Gyula Baranyai, Ferenc Berkesi, Vilmos Drobnits, Dénes Dubán, András Fenyő, András Kesjár, József Klein, János Kovács, László Kovács, István Marosi, Béla Rácz, László Stiller, Sándor Tamásdi, Béla Tímár, Ferenc Vígh.

Coach: Árpád Csicsmányi

1967 World Championship (8th place)

János Adorján, András Fenyő, Ferenc Gyűrű, Sándor Kaló, József Klein, Ádám Koch, János Kovács, László Kovács, István Marosi, Attila Nagy, Lajos Simó, Béla Tímár, János Tornóczky, István Varga.

Coach: Miklós Albrecht

1970 World Championship (8th place)

János Adorján, János Csík, András Fenyő, József Horváth, Sándor Kaló, László Kovács, István Marosi, Lajos Simó, János Stiller, István Szabó, László Szabó, Sándor Takács, István Varga, Sándor Vass.

Coach: Miklós Albrecht

1972 Olympic Games (8th place)

János Adorján, Béla Bartalos, János Csík, László Harka, József Horváth, Sándor Kaló, István Marosi, Lajos Simó, János Stiller, István Szabó, László Szabó, Sándor Takács, István Varga, Károly Vass, Sándor Vass.

Coach: Miklós Albrecht

1974 World Championship (7th place)

Béla Bartalos, Ferenc Buday, Ferenc Demjén, Ernő Gubányi, József Horváth, János Hunyadkürti, Pál Kocsis, Péter Kovács, Lajos Simó, János Stiller, István Szilágyi, Károly Vass, Sándor Vass, Titusz Zuber.

Coach: Mihály Faludi

1976 Olympic Games (6th place)

Béla Bartalos, Ferenc Buday, Ernő Gubányi, László Jánovszki, József Kenyeres, Zsolt Kontra, Péter Kovács, Mihály Süvöltős, István Szilágyi, István Varga, Károly Vass, Gábor Verőci.

Coach: Mihály Faludi

1978 World Championship (9th place)

Béla Bartalos, Ferenc Buday, Ernő Gubányi, László Jánovszki, József Kenyeres, Pál Kocsis, Zsolt Kontra, Péter Kovács, Gyula Molnár, Mihály Süvöltős, László Szabó, István Szilágyi, Zoltán Várkonyi, Gábor Verőci.

Coach: Mihály Faludi

1980 Olympic Games (4th place)

Béla Bartalos, János Fodor, Ernő Gubányi, László Jánovszki, Alpár Jegenyés, József Kenyeres, Zsolt Kontra, Miklós Kovacsics, Péter Kovács, Ambrus Lele, Árpád Pál, László Szabó, István Szilágyi, Sándor Vass.

Coach: Mihály Faludi

1982 World Championship (9th place)

Béla Bartalos, János Gyurka, László Hoffmann, Gábor Horváth, Alpár Jegenyés, József Kenyeres, Pál Kocsis, Zsolt Kontra, Mihály Kovács, Péter Kovács, Ambrus Lele, László Szabó, István Szilágyi, Géza Tóth, Károly Vass.

Coach: Mihály Faludi

1986 World Championship (runners-up)

Imre Bíró, József Bordás, Viktor Debre, János Fodor, János Gyurka, László Hoffmann, Gábor Horváth, Mihály Iváncsik, József Kenyeres, Zsolt Kontra, Mihály Kovács, Péter Kovács, László Marosi, László Szabó, Tibor Oross.

Coach: Lajos Mocsai

1988 Olympic Games (4th place)

Imre Bíró, József Bordás, Ottó Csicsay, János Fodor, János Gyurka, László Hoffmann, Mihály Iváncsik, Mihály Kovács, Péter Kovács, László Marosi, Tibor Oross, Jakab Sibalin, László Szabó, Géza Tóth.

Coach: Lajos Mocsai

1990 World Championship (6th place)

Imre Bíró, József Bordás, Attila Borsos, Ferenc Füzesi, Sándor Győrffy, János Gyurka, László Hoffmann, Mihály Iváncsik, Mihály Kovács, Géza Lehel, László Marosi, István Pribék, Jenő Putics, Jakab Sibalin.

Coach: János Csík

1992 Olympic Games (7th place)

Imre Bíró, Attila Borsos, Ottó Csicsay, István Csoknyai, József Éles, Ferenc Füzesi, Sándor Győrffy, Attila Horváth, Mihály Iváncsik, László Marosi, Richárd Mezei, Jakab Sibalin, László Sótonyi, János Szathmári, Igor Zubjuk.

Coach: Attila Joósz

1993 World Championship (11th place)

Csaba Bartók, Imre Bíró, Attila Borsos, István Csoknyai, József Éles, Róbert Fekete, Kálmán Fenyő, Sándor Győrffy, János Gyurka, Attila Horváth, Balázs Kertész, Richárd Mezei, Árpád Mohácsi, István Pásztor, László Sótonyi, János Szathmári.

Coach: László Kovács

1994 European Championship (7th place)

Csaba Bartók, Attila Borsos, István Csoknyai, József Éles, Róbert Fekete, István Gulyás, Balázs Kertész, István Kiss, Richárd Mezei, Zoltán Németh, István Pásztor, Zsolt Perger, László Sótonyi, János Szathmári, György Zsigmond.

Coach: Sándor Kaló

1995 World Championship (17–20th place)

Attila Borsos, József Éles, Róbert Fekete, István Gulyás, István Kiss, Attila Kotormán, Péter Kovács, Árpád Mohácsi, Zsolt Perger, István Rosta, Miklós Rosta, László Sótonyi, János Szathmári, Lajos Török, Igor Zubjuk, György Zsigmond.

Coach: Sándor Kaló

1996 European Championship (10th place)

Csaba Bartók, Csaba Bendó, Péter Borsodi, István Csoknyai, Róbert Fekete, Ákos Kis, Attila Kotormán, Rudolf Kubasi, Richárd Mezei, Zoltán Nagy, András Oszlánczi, István Pásztor, László Sótonyi, János Szathmári, István Szotyori, György Zsigmond.

Coach: Árpád Kővári

1997 World Championship (4th place)

Csaba Bendó, Zoltán Bergendi, István Csoknyai, József Éles, István Gulyás, Balázs Kertész, Ákos Kis, Richárd Mezei, István Pásztor, Zsolt Perger, Miklós Rosta, László Sótonyi, János Szathmári, Tibor Tyetyák, Igor Zubjuk, György Zsigmond.

Coach: Sándor Vass

1998 European Championship (6th place)

Csaba Bartók, István Csoknyai, Róbert Fekete, István Gulyás, Balázs Kertész, Ákos Kis, Attila Kotormán, Richárd Mezei, István Pásztor, Miklós Rosta, László Sótonyi, János Szathmári, György Zsigmond.

Coach: Sándor Vass

1999 World Championship (11th place)

Csaba Bendó, Tamás Bene, István Csoknyai, Gábor Décsi, József Éles, Nándor Fazekas, István Gulyás, Balázs Kertész, Ákos Kis, Attila Kotormán, Richárd Mezei, László Nagy, Zsolt Perger, István Rosta, László Sótonyi, János Szathmári.

Coach: Sándor Vass

2003 World Championship (6th place)

Csaba Bendó, Dániel Buday, Ákos Doros, Nándor Fazekas, Gyula Gál, Gergő Iváncsik, Máté Józsa, Dávid Katzirz, Balázs Kertész, Balázs Laluska, Péter Lendvay, László Nagy, István Pásztor (captain), Carlos Pérez, Miklós Rosta, János Szathmári.

Coach: László Skaliczki

2004 European Championship (9th place)

Dániel Buday, Gábor Császár, Ivo Díaz, Nándor Fazekas, Gyula Gál, Ferenc Ilyés, Gergő Iváncsik, Balázs Kertész, Balázs Laluska, Richárd Mezei, Tamás Mocsai, Árpád Mohácsi, László Nagy, István Pásztor (captain), Miklós Rosta, János Szathmári.

Coach: László Skaliczki

2004 Olympic Games (4th place)

Gábor Császár, Ivo Díaz, Nándor Fazekas, Gyula Gál, Gergely Harsányi, Ferenc Ilyés, Gergő Iváncsik, Balázs Laluska, Péter Lendvay, Richárd Mezei, Tamás Mocsai, László Nagy, István Pásztor (captain), Carlos Pérez, János Szathmári.

Coach: László Skaliczki

2006 European Championship (13th place)

Dániel Buday, Gábor Császár, Nándor Fazekas, Gyula Gál, Gergely Harsányi, Ferenc Ilyés, Gergő Iváncsik, Tamás Iváncsik, Máté Józsa, Balázs Laluska, Péter Lendvay, Roland Mikler, László Nagy (captain), Gábor Szente, Szabolcs Törő, Szabolcs Zubai.

Coach: László Skaliczki

2007 World Championship (9th place)

Gábor Császár, Ivo Díaz, Nándor Fazekas, Gyula Gál, Gábor Herbert, Ferenc Ilyés, Gergő Iváncsik, Tamás Iváncsik, Dávid Katzirz, Tamás Mocsai, László Nagy (captain), Kornél Nagy, Nenad Puljezevics, Péter Tatai, Csaba Tombor, Attila Vadkerti.

Coach: László Skaliczki

2008 European Championship (8th place)

Gábor Császár, Nikola Eklemovics, Nándor Fazekas, Gyula Gál, Gábor Grebenár, Péter Gulyás, Gábor Herbert, Ferenc Ilyés, Gergő Iváncsik, Tamás Iváncsik, Balázs Laluska, Tamás Mocsai, Kornél Nagy, László Nagy (captain), Nenad Puljezevics, Szabolcs Törő, Szabolcs Zubai.

Coach: László Skaliczki

2009 World Championship (6th place)

Gábor Császár, Nikola Eklemovics, Nándor Fazekas, Gyula Gál, Gergely Harsányi, Gábor Herbert, Ferenc Ilyés, Gergő Iváncsik, Tamás Iváncsik, Dávid Katzirz, Tamás Mocsai, László Nagy (captain), Nenad Puljezevics, Barna Putics, Szabolcs Törő, Szabolcs Zubai.

Coach: János Hajdu

2010 European Championship (14th place)

Gábor Császár, Nikola Eklemovics, Nándor Fazekas, Gyula Gál (captain), Péter Gulyás, Ferenc Ilyés, Gergő Iváncsik, Tamás Iváncsik, Dávid Katzirz, Milorad Krivokapić, Balázs Laluska, Kornél Nagy, Nenad Puljezevics, Timuzsin Schuch, Szabolcs Törő, Szabolcs Zubai.

Coach: István Csoknyai

2011 World Championship (7th place)

Gábor Császár, Nándor Fazekas, Gyula Gál (captain), Péter Gulyás, Gergely Harsányi, Ferenc Ilyés, Gergő Iváncsik, Tamás Iváncsik, Dávid Katzirz, Máté Lékai, Roland Mikler, Tamás Mocsai, Kornél Nagy, Carlos Pérez, Timuzsin Schuch, Szabolcs Törő, Szabolcs Zubai.

Coach: Lajos Mocsai

2012 European Championship (8th place)

Gábor Ancsin, Gábor Császár, Nándor Fazekas, Gergely Harsányi, Ferenc Ilyés (captain), Gergő Iváncsik, Tamás Iváncsik, Milorad Krivokapić, Balázs Laluska, Roland Mikler, Tamás Mocsai, Kornél Nagy, Barna Putics, Timuzsin Schuch, Szabolcs Szöllősi, Attila Vadkerti, Szabolcs Zubai.

Coach: Lajos Mocsai

2012 Olympic Games (4th place)

Gábor Császár, Nándor Fazekas, Péter Gulyás, Gergely Harsányi, Ferenc Ilyés (captain), Gergő Iváncsik, Balázs Laluska, Máté Lékai, Roland Mikler, Tamás Mocsai, László Nagy, Carlos Pérez, Barna Putics, Timuzsin Schuch, Attila Vadkerti, Szabolcs Zubai.

Coach: Lajos Mocsai

2013 World Championship (8th place)

Gábor Ancsin, Gábor Császár, Gergely Harsányi (captain), Gergő Iváncsik, Milorad Krivokapić, Máté Lékai, Roland Mikler, Tamás Mocsai, Kornél Nagy, László Nagy, Barna Putics, Timuzsin Schuch, Szabolcs Szöllősi, Péter Tatai, Attila Vadkerti, Szabolcs Zubai.

Coach: Lajos Mocsai

2014 European Championship (8th place)

Gábor Ancsin, Gábor Császár, Péter Gulyás, Ferenc Ilyés (captain), Gergő Iváncsik, Máté Lékai, Roland Mikler, Tamás Mocsai, Kornél Nagy, Barna Putics, Gábor Szalafai, Timuzsin Schuch, Szabolcs Szöllősi, Péter Tatai, Attila Vadkerti, Bence Zdolik, Szabolcs Zubai.

Coach: Lajos Mocsai

2016 European Championship (12th place)

Gábor Ancsin, Bence Bánhidi, László Bartucz, Richárd Bodó, Tamás Borsos, Rudolf Faluvégi, Tibor Gazdag, Péter Hornyák, Gergő Iváncsik, Iman Jamali, Roland Mikler, Kornél Nagy, László Nagy (captain), Ákos Pásztor, Timuzsin Schuch, Szabolcs Zubai.

Coach: Talant Duyshebaev

2017 World Championship (7th place)

Gábor Ancsin, Zsolt Balogh, Bence Bánhidi, Richárd Bodó, Gábor Császár, Nándor Fazekas, Péter Gulyás, Gergely Harsányi, Iman Jamali, Ádám Juhász, Máté Lékai, Patrik Ligetvári, Roland Mikler, László Nagy (captain), Szabolcs Szöllősi, Timuzsin Schuch, Szabolcs Zubai.

Coach: Xavi Sabaté

2018 European Championship (14th place)

Gábor Ancsin, Zsolt Balogh, Donát Bartók, Bence Bánhidi, Richárd Bodó, Ádám Borbély, Gábor Császár, Dávid Fekete, Péter Hornyák, Iman Jamali, Ádám Juhász, Máté Lékai, Patrik Ligetvári, Roland Mikler, Ádám Országh, Szabolcs Szöllősi, Timuzsin Schuch (captain), Uroš Vilovski.

Coach: Ljubomir Vranjes

2019 World Championship (10th place)

Gábor Ancsin, Zsolt Balogh, Bence Bánhidi, Richárd Bodó, Bendegúz Bóka, Gábor Császár, Péter Hornyák, Ferenc Ilyés (captain), Iman Jamali, Ádám Juhász, Máté Lékai, Patrik Ligetvári, Dominik Máthé, Roland Mikler, László Nagy, Timuzsin Schuch, Adrián Sipos, Márton Székely, Zoltán Szita.

Coach: István Csoknyai, Vladan Matić

2020 European Championship (9th place)

Arián Andó, Zsolt Balogh, Donát Bartók, Bence Bánhidi, Bendegúz Bóka, Bálint Fekete, Mátyás Győri, Péter Hornyák, Patrik Ligetvári, Dominik Máthé, Roland Mikler (captain), Bence Nagy, Miklós Rosta, Adrián Sipos, Márton Székely, Zoltán Szita, Ádám Tóth, Dávid Ubornyák.

Coach: István Gulyás

2021 World Championship (5th place)

Gábor Ancsin, Zsolt Balogh, Bence Bánhidi, Richárd Bodó, Ádám Borbély, Bendegúz Bóka, Mátyás Győri, Egon Hanusz, Péter Hornyák, Máté Lékai, Dominik Máthé, Roland Mikler (captain), Bence Nagy, Pedro Rodríguez Álvarez, Miklós Rosta, Adrián Sipos, Stefan Sunajko, Márton Székely, Zoltán Szita, Petar Topic.

Coach: István Gulyás

2022 European Championship (15th place)

Gábor Ancsin, Bence Bánhidi, Richárd Bodó, Ádám Borbély, Bendegúz Bóka, Bendegúz Bujdosó, Mátyás Győri, Egon Hanusz, Máté Lékai, Patrik Ligetvári, Dominik Máthé, Roland Mikler (captain), Bence Nagy, Pedro Rodríguez Álvarez, Miklós Rosta, Adrián Sipos, Stefan Sunajko, Márton Székely, Zoltán Szita, Petar Topic.

Coach: István Gulyás

2023 World Championship (8th place)

Gábor Ancsin, Bence Bánhidi, Richárd Bodó, Bendegúz Bóka, Bendegúz Bujdosó, Egon Hanusz, Zoran Ilić, Péter Kovacsics, Csaba Leimeter, Máté Lékai, Patrik Ligetvári, Roland Mikler (captain), Kristóf Palasics, Pedro Rodríguez Álvarez, Miklós Rosta, Adrián Sipos, Márton Székely, Zoltán Szita, Szabolcs Szöllősi.

Coach: Chema Rodríguez

2024 European Championship (5th place)

Gábor Ancsin 8/24, Arián Andó 2/0, Bence Bánhidi 8/32, László Bartucz 7/0, Richárd Bodó 8/17, Bendegúz Bóka 8/15, Gergő Fazekas 8/18, Egon Hanusz 6/8, Zoran Ilić 8/7, Bence Imre 6/20, Bence Krakovszki 0/0, Zsolt Krakovszki 2/4, Máté Lékai (captain) 8/29, Patrik Ligetvári 8/2, Dominik Máthé 5/14, Kristóf Palasics 5/0, Miklós Rosta 7/23, Adrián Sipos 8/4, Zoltán Szita 7/11, Szabolcs Szöllősi 0/0.

Coach: Chema Rodríguez

2024 Olympic Games (10th place)

Gábor Ancsin 5/13, Bence Bánhidi 5/17, László Bartucz 4/0, Richárd Bodó 5/19, Bendegúz Bóka 5/9, Gergő Fazekas 5/10, Egon Hanusz 1/0, Zoran Ilić 5/9, Bence Imre 4/26, Máté Lékai (captain) 5/13, Patrik Ligetvári 5/1, Roland Mikler 2/0, Kristóf Palasics 4/0, Pedro Rodríguez Álvarez 3/2, Miklós Rosta 3/8, Adrián Sipos 5/0, Zoltán Szita 4/10.

Coach: Chema Rodríguez

2025 World Championship (8th place)

Gábor Ancsin 4/3, Bence Bánhidi 7/16, László Bartucz 3/0, Richárd Bodó 7/18, Bendegúz Bóka 6/17, Gergő Fazekas 7/14, Egon Hanusz 2/2, Zoran Ilić 7/26, Bence Imre 7/28, Bence Krakovszki 5/4, Zsolt Krakovszki 3/5, Máté Lékai (captain) 6/22, Patrik Ligetvári 7/4, Roland Mikler 4/1, Máté Ónodi-Jánoskúti 5/8, Kristóf Palasics 7/0, Pedro Rodríguez Álvarez 4/11, Miklós Rosta 7/4, Adrián Sipos 7/5, Zoltán Szita 7/28.

Coach: Chema Rodríguez

2026 European Championship (10th place)

Arián Andó 0/0, László Bartucz 7/0, Richárd Bodó 7/16, Bendegúz Bóka 7/14, Gergő Fazekas 7/23, Egon Hanusz 7/7, Zoran Ilić 7/21, Bence Imre 7/46, Bence Krakovszki 7/3, Patrik Ligetvári 7/6, Péter Lukács 7/0, Máté Ónodi-Jánoskúti 5/10, Kristóf Palasics 7/1, Tamás Papp 2/0, Andrej Pergel 5/4, Pedro Rodríguez Álvarez 2/4, Miklós Rosta 7/29, Adrián Sipos (captain) 7/2, Benjámin Szilágyi 0/0, Zoltán Szita 7/16.

Coach: Chema Rodríguez

=== Coaching history ===
Period	Head Coach
1958	(Hungary) Sándor Cséfai
1959–1961	(Hungary) István Hetey
1962–1964	(Hungary) Árpád Csicsmányi
1964–1973	(Hungary) Miklós Albrecht
1973–1982	(Hungary) Mihály Faludi
1982–1985	(Hungary) László Kovács
1985–1989	(Hungary) Lajos Mocsai
1989–1990	(Hungary) János Csík
1991–1992	(Hungary) Attila Joósz
1992–1993	(Hungary) László Kovács
1993–1995	(Hungary) Sándor Kaló
1995–1996	(Hungary) Árpád Kővári
1997–1999	(Hungary) Sándor Vass
1999–2001	(Hungary) János Hajdu
2001–2008	(Hungary) László Skaliczki
2008–2009	(Hungary) János Hajdu
2009–2010	(Hungary) István Csoknyai
2010–2014	(Hungary) Lajos Mocsai
2014–2016	(Spain) Talant Dujshebaev
2016–2017	(Spain) Xavi Sabaté
2017–2018	(Sweden) Ljubomir Vranjes
2018–2019	(Hungary) István Csoknyai
2019–2022	(Hungary) István Gulyás
2022–present	(Spain) Chema Rodríguez

== Statistics ==
=== Records ===
Highlighted names denote a player still playing or available for selection..

Total number of matches played in official competitions only.

Most matches played
Player	Career	Caps	Pos	Goals
Péter Kovács	1973–1995	323	LB	1,797
János Szathmári	1988–2010	302	GK	2
Béla Bartalos	1970–1984	288	GK	2
Gergő Iváncsik	2000–2017	270	LW	696
Gábor Császár	2004–2019	247	CB	845
Nándor Fazekas	1998–2017	238	GK	1
Ferenc Ilyés	2003–2019	229	LB	502
József Kenyeres	1974–1994	224		496
István Pásztor	1992–2004	215	LW	830
István Szilágyi	1972–1983	214	P	541
László Szabó	1976–1988	211	P	374
Szabolcs Zubai	2004–2017	211	P	308
László Nagy	1999–2019	209	RB	749
Roland Mikler	2004–present	208	GK	0
Zsolt Kontra	1975–1988	198	LW	523
János Gyurka	1981–1995	191	RB	662
László Sótonyi	1990–2001	190	CB, OB	518
Tamás Mocsai	1999–2014	190	RB	439
Richárd Mezei	1992–2004	184	P	280
Gyula Gál	1999–2011	180	P	442
József Éles	1989–2000	179	CB, LB	828
Gergely Harsányi	2002–2017	179	RB	399
László Marosi	1983–1992	171	LB, LW	710
Balázs Kertész	1989–2004	171	RW	361
István Csoknyai	1991–2004	170	RB	168
Timuzsin Schuch	2006–2019	170	P	80
Mihály Iváncsik	1984–1992	169	RW	623
Mihály Kovács	1976–1990	168	CB	244
Lajos Simó	1965–1977	162		
Ernő Gubányi	1972–1980	159	D	

Total number of goals scored in official matches only.

Most goals scored
Player	Goals	Matches	Average
Péter Kovács	1,797	323	5.56
Gábor Császár	845	247	3.42
István Pásztor	830	215	3.86
József Éles	828	179	4.58
László Nagy	749	209	3.58
László Marosi	710	171	4.15
Gergő Iváncsik	696	270	2.57
János Gyurka	662	191	3.47
Mihály Iváncsik	623	169	3.69
István Szilágyi	541	214	2.53

=== Record against other teams ===
As of 25 January 2021

Key
Positive total balance (more wins)
Neutral total balance (equal W/L ratio)
Negative total balance (more losses)

National team	Total				Olympic Games				World Championship				European Championship				Qualifications				Other			
National team	Pld	W	D	L	Pld	W	D	L	Pld	W	D	L	Pld	W	D	L	Pld	W	D	L	Pld	W	D	L
Algeria	13	11	2	0	0	0	0	0	5	5	0	0	—	—	—	—	0	0	0	0	8	6	2	0
Angola	2	2	0	0	0	0	0	0	2	2	0	0	—	—	—	—	0	0	0	0	0	0	0	0
Argentina	4	3	1	1	0	0	0	0	3	2	1	0	—	—	—	—	0	0	0	0	1	1	0	0
Australia	4	4	0	0	0	0	0	0	3	3	0	0	—	—	—	—	0	0	0	0	1	1	0	0
Austria	47	34	2	11	0	0	0	0	0	0	0	0	1	0	0	1	2	2	0	0	44	32	2	10
Azerbaijan SSR	2	2	0	0	0	0	0	0	0	0	0	0	—	—	—	—	0	0	0	0	2	2	0	0
Asian team	1	1	0	0	0	0	0	0	0	0	0	0	0	0	0	0	0	0	0	0	1	1	0	0
Bahrain	3	3	0	0	0	0	0	0	0	0	0	0	—	—	—	—	0	0	0	0	3	3	0	0
Belgium	6	6	0	0	0	0	0	0	0	0	0	0	—	—	—	—	2	2	0	0	4	4	0	0
Belarus	8	7	0	1	0	0	0	0	1	0	0	1	2	2	0	0	2	2	0	0	3	3	0	0
Byelorussian SSR	2	1	0	1	0	0	0	0	0	0	0	0	—	—	—	—	0	0	0	0	2	1	0	1
Bosnia and Herzegovina	4	4	0	0	0	0	0	0	0	0	0	0	0	0	0	0	4	4	0	0	0	0	0	0
Brazil	6	6	0	0	2	2	0	0	2	2	0	0	—	—	—	—	1	1	0	0	1	1	0	0
Bulgaria	41	39	1	1	0	0	0	0	4	4	0	0	0	0	0	0	6	5	0	1	31	30	1	0
(Canada) canada	2	2	0	0	0	0	0	0	0	0	0	0	—	—	—	—	0	0	0	0	2	2	0	0
Chile	1	1	0	0	0	0	0	0	1	1	0	0	—	—	—	—	0	0	0	0	0	0	0	0
China	2	2	0	0	0	0	0	0	1	1	0	0	—	—	—	—	0	0	0	0	1	1	0	0
(Commonwealth of Independent States) CIS	4	0	1	3	0	0	0	0	0	0	0	0	—	—	—	—	0	0	0	0	4	0	1	3
Cuba	5	5	0	0	1	1	0	0	1	1	0	0	—	—	—	—	0	0	0	0	3	3	0	0
Croatia	34	9	5	20	3	0	0	3	7	1	0	6	3	1	1	1	4	2	0	2	15	5	4	8
Cyprus	2	2	0	0	0	0	0	0	0	0	0	0	0	0	0	0	2	2	0	0	0	0	0	0
Czech Republic	29	20	2	7	0	0	0	0	2	2	0	0	4	2	0	2	2	1	0	1	21	15	2	4
Czechoslovakia	59	33	6	20	3	2	0	1	6	2	2	2	—	—	—	—	0	0	0	1	50	29	4	16
Denmark	43	19	4	20	2	1	0	1	10	5	1	4	6	0	1	5	4	1	2	1	19	13	0	9
Egypt	17	15	2	0	1	1	0	0	3	2	1	0	—	—	—	—	0	0	0	0	13	12	1	0
Estonia	2	2	0	0	0	0	0	0	0	0	0	0	0	0	0	0	2	2	0	0	0	0	0	0
Finland	8	6	0	2	0	0	0	0	0	0	0	0	0	0	0	0	4	4	0	0	4	2	0	2
France	39	19	3	17	1	0	0	1	9	3	0	6	4	2	1	1	2	1	1	0	23	13	1	9
Greece	5	5	0	0	1	1	0	0	0	0	0	0	0	0	0	0	2	2	0	0	2	2	0	0
(Georgia (country)) Georgia	2	2	0	0	0	0	0	0	0	0	0	0	0	0	0	0	2	2	0	0	0	0	0	0
Georgian SSR	10	6	0	4	0	0	0	0	0	0	0	0	—	—	—	—	0	0	0	0	10	4	0	6
Iceland	42	24	3	15	2	1	0	1	9	6	0	3	6	3	1	2	2	1	0	1	23	13	2	8
Israel	5	4	0	1	0	0	0	0	2	2	0	0	—	—	—	—	0	0	0	0	3	2	0	1
Italy	17	17	0	0	0	0	0	0	0	0	0	0	0	0	0	0	6	6	0	0	11	11	0	
Japan	9	7	1	1	2	2	0	0	3	3	0	0	—	—	—	—	0	0	0	0	4	2	1	1
Kuwait	4	4	0	0	0	0	0	0	1	1	0	0	—	—	—	—	3	3	0	0	3	3	0	0
Latvia	4	3	1	0	0	0	0	0	0	0	0	0	4	3	1	0	0	0	0	0				
Lithuania	11	9	0	2	0	0	0	0	0	0	0	0	8	6	0	2	3	3	0	0				
Lithuanian SSR	1	0	0	1	0	0	0	0	0	0	0	0	—	—	—	—	0	0	0	0	0	0	0	1
Netherlands	21	21	0	0	0	0	0	0	1	1	0	0	0	0	0	0	3	3	0	0	17	17	0	0
Qatar	3	3	0	0	0	0	0	0	1	1	0	0	—	—	—	—	0	0	0	0	2	2	0	0
Serbia*	9	5	0	4	0	0	0		1	1	0		2	0	0	2	0	0	0		6	4	0	2
South Korea	12	9	0	3	4	2	0	2	4	3	0	1	—	—	—	—	0	0	0	0	4	4	0	0
United Arab Republic	1	1	0	0	0	0	0	0	0	0	0	0	—	—	—	—	0	0	0	0	1	1	0	0
(Socialist Federal Republic of Yugoslavia) Yugoslavia	70	17	9	44	3	0	0	3	7	1	1	5	—	—	—	—	2	1	0	1	58	15	8	35

* includes games against Serbia and Montenegro

== Kit suppliers ==
Hungary's kits have been supplied by Adidas.
