= Ádám Juhász =

Hungarian handball player (born 1996)

Personal information
- Nationality: Hungarian
- Born: 6 June 1996 (age 30) Debrecen, Hungary
- Height: 1.89 m (6 ft 2 in)

Sport
- Sport: Handball
- Position: Central Back
- Current club: Budai Farkasok KKUK
- Number: 7

Youth career
- Years: Team
- 2007–2012: Debreceni SC-SI

Senior clubs
- Years: Team
- 2012–2022: Grundfos Tatabánya KC
- 2022–2023: S.L. Benfica
- 2023–2024: MOL Tatabánya KC
- 2024–2025: Budakalász FKC
- 2025–: Budai Farkasok KKUK
National team
Years	Team	Apps	(Gls)
2016–	Hungary	47	(95)
Medal record
Youth European Championship
Silver medal – second place	2014 Poland

Ádám Juhász (born 6 June 1996) is a Hungarian handballer for Budakalász FKC and the Hungarian national team.

== Career ==
=== Club ===
Ádám Juhász was born in Debrecen and grew up here in the Debreceni SC-SI team, then he started playing handball. After winning the age group championship in 2009 and 2011 in 2012, together with his two teammates Grundfos Tatabánya KC - Tamás Boros and Norbert Jóga. Juhász, who by then had collected several unique awards, who was the best in the Debrecen division, won the Student Olympics with his team and soon received the city's "Good Student - Good Athlete" award, soon, already in the spring of the 2012–2013 season, he was able to introduce himself to the adult team of Grundfos Tatabánya KC. He soon became one of the best and core people on the team, extending his contract with the club several times. On 2 September 2019, he suffered a cross ribbon rupture at the season opener against DVTK-Eger. Tatabánya spent 1 year with the injured Ádám Juhász. In 2021, he renewed with Grundfos Tatabánya KC again. After the 2021/22 season, the team captain left Grundfos Tatabánya KC after 10 years and transferred to the Portuguese first division S.L. Benfica. In 2022, he won the Portuguese Super Cup with S.L. Benfica. They beat Sporting CP in the final, Ádám scored 9 goals. In January 2023, he suffered a serious eye injury during the individual warm-up during the training of the Hungary national handball team and therefore missed the 2023 World Men's Handball Championship. After surgery on the fourth eye - which was an artificial lens insertion - he recovered completely. In May 2023, he reconfirmed with the MOL Tatabánya KC team.

=== National team ===
He was a team captain at the 2014 U18 European Championships, where the Hungarian team won a silver medal and Ádám Juhász was chosen as the most valuable player in the tournament. He was 10th with the Hungarian team at the 2015 World Youth Championship. He also took part in the Junior European Championship in Denmark in 2016, but János Gyurka's team only took 10th place here. Xavi Sabaté, who manages the adults, also noticed his performance, who invited him to the Hungarian national team preparing for the European Championship qualifiers, and then he was able to present himself in an adult coat of arms on the occasion of his 24–16 victory against the Latvians. In January 2017, Sabaté also placed her in the frame called the World Championships in France, so she was able to prepare for her first adult world competition at the age of 20. He then competed in the 2018 European and 2019 World Men's Handball Championship. The rupture of the crucifix on 2 September 2019, meant he missed the 2020 European Championships.

== Honours ==
=== National team ===
- Youth European Championship:
  - Silver: 2014

=== Club ===
Grundfos Tatabánya KC

- Nemzeti Bajnokság I
  - Bronze: 2015, 2016, 2017, 2018, 2019, 2021, 2024
- Magyar Kupa
  - Bronze: 2014, 2017

S.L. Benfica

- Andebol 1
  - Bronze: 2023
- Portuguese Super Cup
  - Gold: 2022

=== Individual ===
- Most Valuable Player (MVP) in the Youth European Championship: 2014
- Hungarian Youth Handballer of the Year: 2014, 2015
