= Stefan Sunajko =

Serbian-Hungarian handball player (born 1998)

Personal information
- Nationality: Serbian / Hungarian
- Born: 10 April 1998 (age 28) Sombor, Serbia, FR Yugoslavia
- Height: 1.94 m (6 ft 4 in)

Sport
- Sport: Handball
- Position: Left wing
- Current club: PLER-Budapest
- Number: 7

Youth career
- Years: Team
- 2010–2013: RK Grafičar Bezdan
- 2013–2016: RK Crvenka

Senior clubs
- Years: Team
- 2016–2020: (Hungary) MOL-Pick Szeged
- 2019–2020: → (Sweden) IK Sävehof (loan)
- 2020–2022: (Hungary) Tatabánya KC
- 2022–2023: (Serbia) RK Dinamo Pančevo
- 2023–2024: (Serbia) RK Vojvodina
- 2024–: (Hungary) PLER KC Budapest
National team
Years	Team		
2016–2017	Serbia youth		
2017–2018	Serbia junior	35	
2021–	Hungary	11	(27)

Stefan Sunajko (Serbian Cyrillic: Стефан Сунајко, Hungarian: Szunajko Stefán; born 10 April 1998) is a Serbian-Hungarian handball player for PLER-Budapest and for the Hungarian national team.

== Career ==
=== Club ===
The left winger previously played for the Serbian RK Grafičar Bezdan and RK Crvenka, then in 2016 he moved to MOL-Pick Szeged. Coach Juan Carlos Pastor seriously counted on the 18-year-old Serbian-Hungarian boy, expected him in the senior team, used him in a league match at the end of November, and immediately scored his first top-flight goal. Not long after that, he also made his debut in the EHF Champions League, scoring against Sweden's IFK Kristianstad. In the MOL-Pick Szeged team, he scored 70 goals in 43 games in the first division in 3 years. Played on loan in the 2019/2020 season in the Swedish team IK Sävehof. Here in the EHF Champions League, he scored 28 goals in 10 games. In April 2020, Grundfos Tatabánya KC announced that it had signed the player for 2 years. Here he was able to play in the EHF European League and scored 52 goals in 19 games in 2 years. When his contract expired in 2022, he moved to Serbia to RK Dinamo Pančevo. In the season, he and his team finished fourth in the Serbian Handball Super League (scoring 128 goals in 29 matches), reached the top 16 in the EHF European Cup (scored 26 times in eight matches), and won a silver medal in the Serbian Cup. At the end of the 2022/23 season, the Serbian champion team will be transferred to RK Vojvodina. In September 2024, he continued his career at PLER-Budapest in the Hungarian top flight, where his brother Filip also became his teammate.

=== National team ===
With the Serbian youth national team he participated at the U-18 European Championship where they finished eighth and Sunajko have been selected for the tournament's all-star team. He also appeared 35 times in the Serbian junior national team

In October 2019 the captain of the Hungarian national team, István Gulyás, also noticed his performance at the IK Sävehof, and invited him to the national team meeting. He played for the Hungarian national team for the first time at the 2021 World Championship against Cape Verde and scored 4 goals (34–27). He scored 14 goals in 5 matches at the 2021 World Championship. He was also a member of the 2022 European Men's Handball Championship squad, but he did not play in a single match at the European Championship. He was included in the large squad of the 2023 World Championship, but in the end he will not become a member of the narrow squad.

== Personal life ==
Stefan's father is Serbian, his mother is Hungarian, and he can claim to be a citizen of both countries. He has an older brother, Filip Sunajko, who is also a professional handball player and plays as a central back.

== Honours ==
=== Club ===
MOL-Pick Szeged

- Nemzeti Bajnokság I:
  - Gold: 2018
  - Silver: 2017, 2019
- Magyar Kupa:
  - Gold: 2019
  - Silver: 2017, 2018

Grundfos Tatabánya KC

- Nemzeti Bajnokság I:
  - Bronze: 2021

RK Dinamo Pančevo

- Serbian Cup:
  - Silver: 2023

RK Vojvodina

- Serbian League:
  - Gold: 2024
- Serbian Cup:
  - Silver: 2024

=== Individual ===
- All-Star Left Wing of the Youth European Championship: 2016
