= Mihály Kovács =

Mihály Kovács may refer to:

- Mihály Kovács (handballer)
- Mihály Kovács (painter)
