= Zoltán Szita =

Hungarian handball player (born 1998)

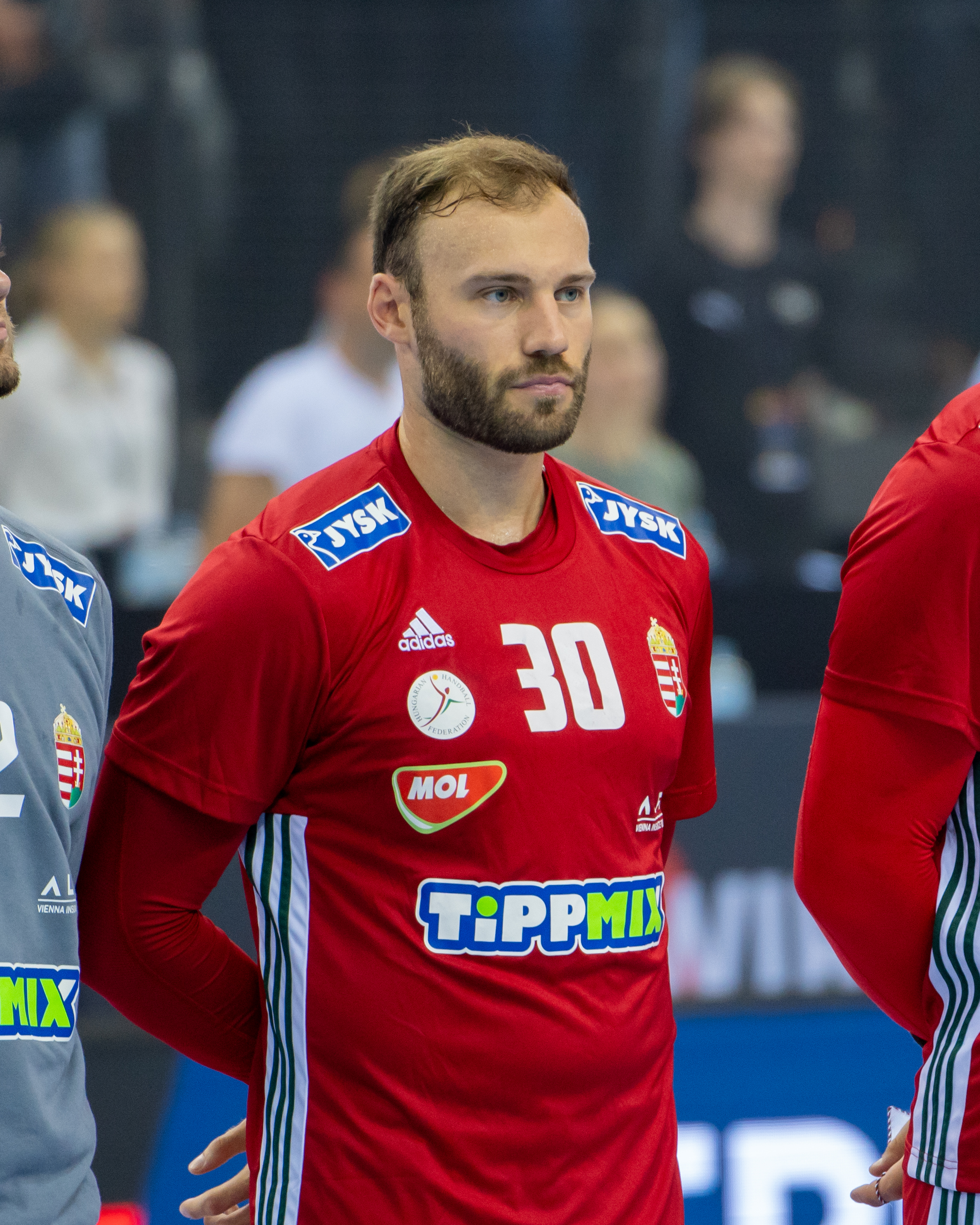

Personal information
- Nationality: Hungarian
- Born: 10 February 1998 (age 28) Veszprém, Hungary
- Height: 1.96 m (6 ft 5 in)

Sport
- Sport: Handball
- Position: Left back
- Current club: Wisła Płock
- Number: 21

Youth career
- Years: Team
- –: Telekom Veszprém

Senior clubs
- Years: Team
- 2016–2020: Telekom Veszprém
- 2017–2019: → Balatonfüredi KSE (loan)
- 2019–2020: → Wisła Płock
- 2020–2022: Wisła Płock
- 2022–2024: OTP Bank-Pick Szeged
- 2024–: Wisła Płock
National team
Years	Team	Apps	(Gls)
2017–	Hungary	104	(259)

Zoltán Szita (born 10 February 1998) is a Hungarian handball player for Wisła Płock and the Hungarian national team.

He represented Hungary at the 2019 World Men's Handball Championship.

== Individual awards ==
- Hungarian Youth Handballer of the Year: 2016, 2017
- Hungarian Junior Handballer of the Year: 2019
