= Balázs Laluska =

Hungarian handball player (born 1981)

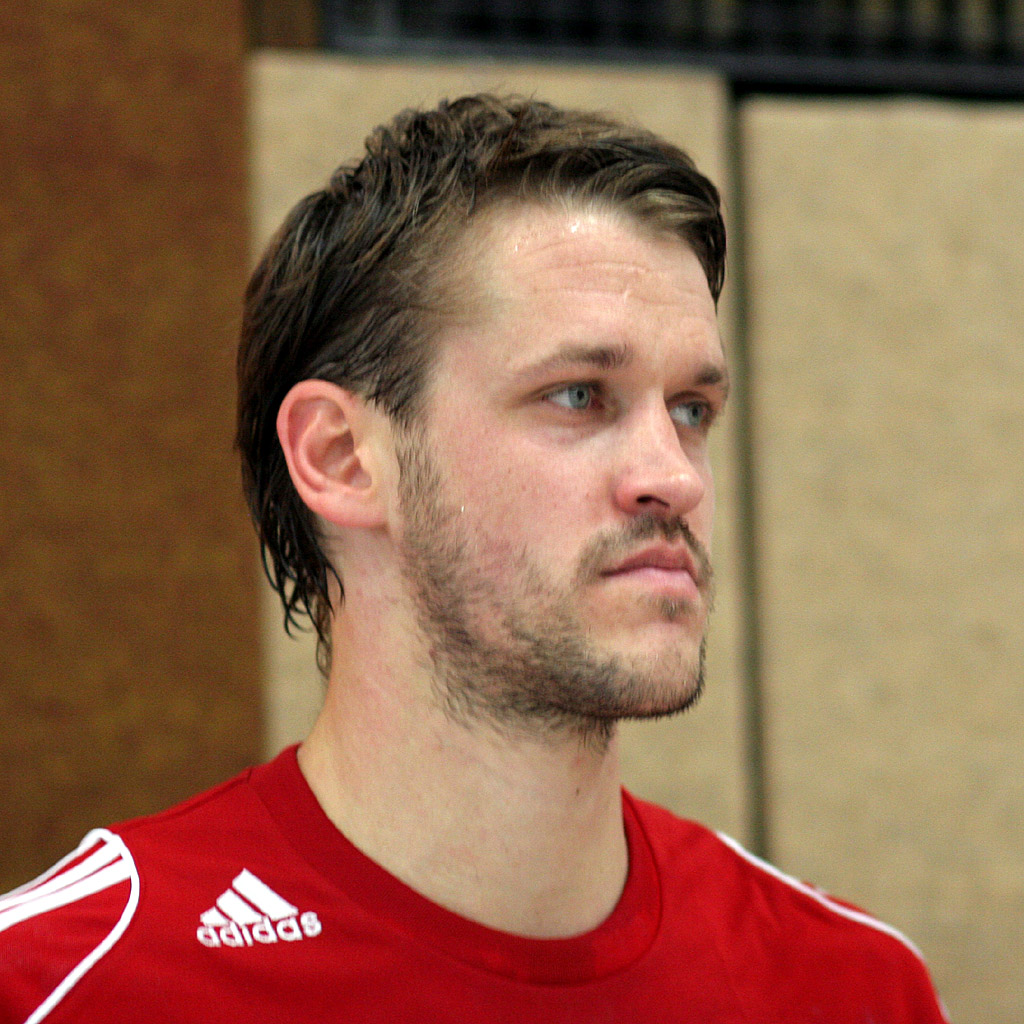

Personal information
- Full name: Balázs Laluska
- Nationality: Hungarian
- Born: 20 June 1981 (age 45) Szeged, Hungary
- Height: 2.02 m (6 ft 8 in)

Sport
- Sport: Handball
- Position: Right Back

Senior clubs
- Years: Team
- 1998–2005: SC Pick Szeged
- 2005–2008: CB Ademar León
- 2008–2009: SC Pick Szeged
- 2009–2010: RK Cimos Koper
- 2010–2014: KC Veszprém
- 2014–2015: Montpellier Handball
- 2015–2016: FKSE Algyő
National team
Years	Team	Apps	(Gls)
2000–2012	Hungary	148	(205)
- Updated on 30 January 2021

Balázs Laluska (born 20 June 1981 in Szeged) is a former Hungarian handballer and current coach.

== Achievements ==
- Nemzeti Bajnokság I:
  - Winner: 2011, 2012
  - Silver Medalist: 2002, 2003, 2004, 2005, 2009
  - Bronze Medalist: 1999, 2000, 2001
- Magyar Kupa:
  - Winner: 2011, 2012
  - Silver Medalist: 2000, 2002, 2003, 2004, 2005, 2009
- Liga ASOBAL:
  - Bronze Medalist: 2007, 2008
- Copa del Rey:
  - Silver Medalist: 2007
- Copa ASOBAL:
  - Silver Medalist: 2008
- Slovenian Championship:
  - Bronze Medalist: 2010
- EHF Cup Winners' Cup:
  - Finalist: 2007

== Individual awards ==
- Golden Cross of the Cross of Merit of the Republic of Hungary (2012)
