= Géza Tóth (handballer) =

Hungarian handball player (1962-2004)

Personal information
- Born: 21 March 1962 Szeged, Hungary
- Died: 18 July 2004 (aged 42)

Sport
- Sport: Handball
National team
- Years: Team
- –: Hungary

Géza Tóth (21 March 1962 – 18 July 2004) was a Hungarian handball player who played for the club SC Pick Szeged and the Hungarian national team. He participated at the 1988 Summer Olympics, where the Hungarian team placed fourth.
