= László Hoffmann =

Hungarian handball player (born 1958)

Medal record

Representing Hungary

Men's Handball

World Championship
Silver medal – second place	1986 Switzerland	Team

László Hoffmann (born 29 June 1958, in Tét) is a Hungarian former handball goalkeeper. He participated on three World Championships between 1982 and 1990 and won the silver medal in 1986. He also played on the 1988 Summer Olympics, where the Hungarian national team placed fourth.

== Awards ==
- Hungarian Handballer of the Year: 1984
