= Sándor Győrffy =

Hungarian handball player (born 1966)

Sándor Győrffy (born 1966 in Budapest) is a Hungarian handball player who played for the Hungarian national handball team. He participated in the 1992 Summer Olympics, where the Hungarian team placed 7th after beating the Romanian team in the final match.
