= Sándor Cséfai =

Hungarian handball player (1904–1984)

Sándor Cséfai (13 July 1904 in Budapest – 2 September 1984 in Budapest) was a Hungarian field handball player who competed in the 1936 Summer Olympics.

He was part of the Hungarian field handball team, which finished fourth in the Olympic tournament. He played three matches.

He then has been coach, especially leading 7-player Hungary national team at 1958 World Championship.
