= Richárd Mezei =

Hungarian handball player (born 1970)

Richárd Mezei (born 23 October 1970 in Hatvan) is a former Hungarian handball player and the current president of SC Pick Szeged.

He is best known for his spells in KC Veszprém and SC Pick Szeged. The hard-working line player has also been capped over 180 times for the Hungarian national team.

He participated at the 1992 Summer Olympics, where the Hungarian team placed seventh, and at the 2004 Summer Olympics, where the team placed fourth. He was also present on three World Championship (1993, 1997, 1999) and took part on four European Championship (1994, 1996, 1998, 2004).
