= István Gulyás (handballer) =

Hungarian handball player and coach (born 1968)

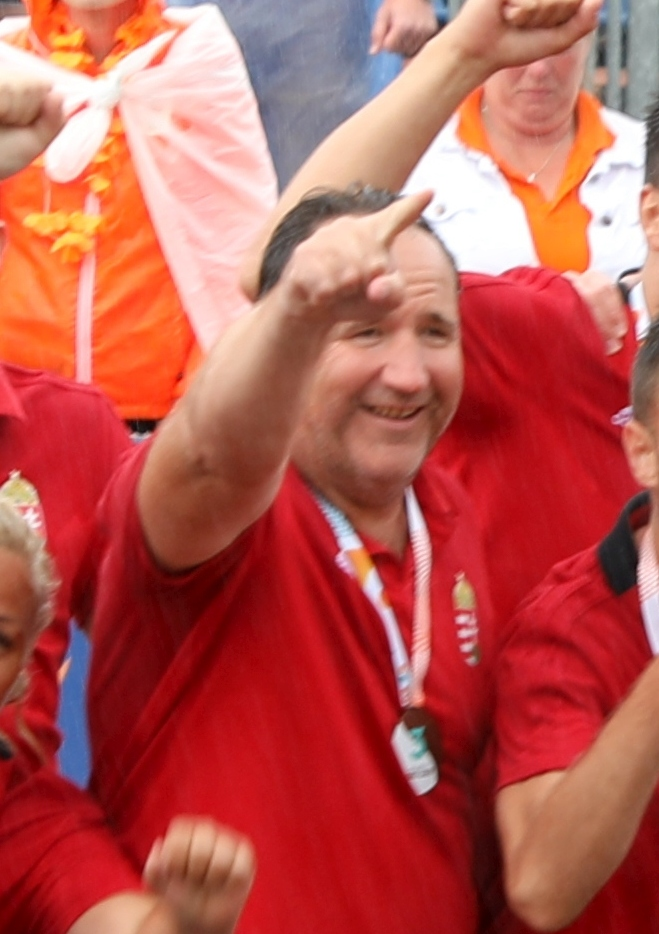

Personal information
- Nationality: Hungarian
- Born: 2 April 1968 (age 58)

Sport
- Sport: Handball
- Position: Centre back

Senior clubs
- Years: Team
- 1985–1999: KC Veszprém
- 1999–2003: HSG Bärnbach-Köflach
- 2003–2006: Rinyamenti KC
National team
Years	Team	Apps	(Gls)
1993–1999	Hungary	84	(145)

Teams managed
- 2006–2007: UHK Krems
- 2007–2011: Khaitan SC
- 2011–2012: Dunaújvárosi NKS
- 2012–2013: Váci NKSE
- 2013–2015: Gyöngyösi KK
- 2017–2018: KC Veszprém II
- 2018: KC Veszprém
- 2019–2022: Hungary

István Gulyás (born 2 April 1968) is a Hungarian handball coach and former handball player and coach of the Hungarian national handball team.

Gulyás spent most of his playing career by Veszprém, the dominant club of his era, with them he won a number of domestic league and cup titles. Among his successes is an EHF Cup Winners' Cup triumph as well, having obtained the title in 1992. In 1995 he was honoured with the Hungarian Handballer of the Year award for his performances throughout the year.

In his later years in tried himself in Austria by HSG Bärnbach-Köflach and finished his career by Hungarian lower division side Rinyamenti KC. UHK Krems, which remembered Gulyás since the years he spent in Austria, appointed him as their head coach in 2006. Gulyás had one season on the bench of Krems, achieving a fifth place in the league. In 2007 he was invited by his friend and former Hungarian international handballer Sándor Kaló to Kuwait to train a local club, which Gulyás accepted, and from 2007 to 2011 he trained Khaitan SC.

Gulyás returned to Hungary in 2011, and in August that year he was named the head coach of Dunaújvárosi NKS.

== Achievements ==
- Nemzeti Bajnokság I:
  - Winner: 1992, 1993, 1994, 1995, 1997, 1998, 1999
- Magyar Kupa:
  - Winner: 1989, 1990, 1991, 1992, 1994, 1995, 1996, 1998, 1999
- EHF Cup Winners' Cup:
  - Winner: 1992
  - Finalist: 1993, 1997

== Awards ==
- Hungarian Handballer of the Year: 1995
