= Nándor Fazekas =

Hungarian handball player (born 1976)

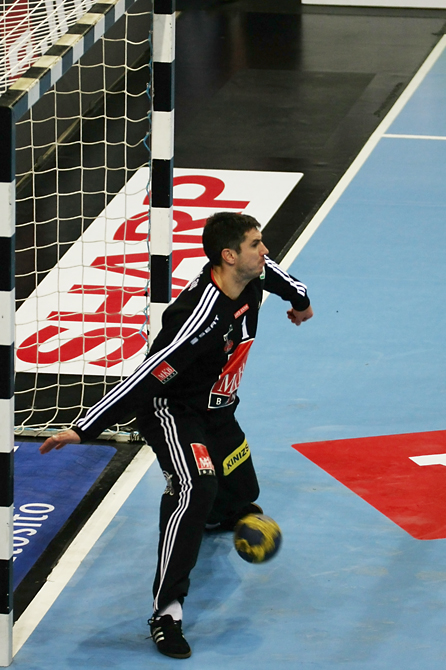

Personal information
- Nationality: Hungarian
- Born: 16 October 1976 (age 50) Kecskemét, Hungary
- Height: 1.92 m (6 ft 4 in)

Sport
- Sport: Handball
- Position: Goalkeeper
- Current club: Retired

Youth career
- Years: Team
- 1990–1994: (Hungary) Lajosmizsei KE
- 1994: (Hungary) Kecskeméti TE

Senior clubs
- Years: Team
- 1994–1997: (Hungary) Fotex Veszprém
- 1997–1998: (Hungary) Dunaferr SE
- 1998–2004: (Hungary) Fotex Veszprém
- 2004–2006: (Germany) TuS Nettelstedt-Lübbecke
- 2006–2009: (Germany) VfL Gummersbach
- 2009–2014: (Hungary) MKB-MVM Veszprém
- 2014–2015: (Qatar) El Jaish SC
- 2015: (Germany) HBW Balingen-Weilstetten
- 2015–2020: (Hungary) Balatonfüredi KSE
National team
| Years | Team | Apps | (Gls) |
| 1998–2017 | Hungary | 238 | (1) |

Teams managed
- 2020–: (Hungary) Veszprém KKFT Felsőörs (assistant)

Nándor Fazekas (born 16 October 1976), is a retired Hungarian handball player.

He made his international debut on 13 May 1998 against Belgium. Since then he participated on six World Championships (1999, 2003, 2007, 2009, 2011, 2017) and five European Championships (2004, 2006, 2008, 2010, 2012).

He was also member of the Hungarian teams which finished fourth at the 2004 Summer Olympics in Athens and the one that finished 4th at the 2012 Summer Olympics

His sons Gergő and Máté are also professional handball players.

== Achievements ==
- Nemzeti Bajnokság I:
  - Winner: 1999, 2001, 2002, 2003, 2004, 2010, 2011, 2012
  - Runner-up: 2000
- Magyar Kupa:
  - Winner: 1999, 2000, 2002, 2003, 2004, 2011, 2012
  - Finalist: 2001
- DHB-Pokal:
  - Finalist: 2009
- EHF Champions League:
  - Finalist: 2002
  - Semifinalist: 2003
- EHF Cup:
  - Winner: 2009
- EHF Champions Trophy:
  - Finalist: 2002

== Individual awards ==
- Hungarian Goalkeeper of the Year: 2009, 2010, 2012
- Golden Cross of the Cross of Merit of the Republic of Hungary (2012)
