= Timuzsin Schuch =

Hungarian handball player (born 1985)

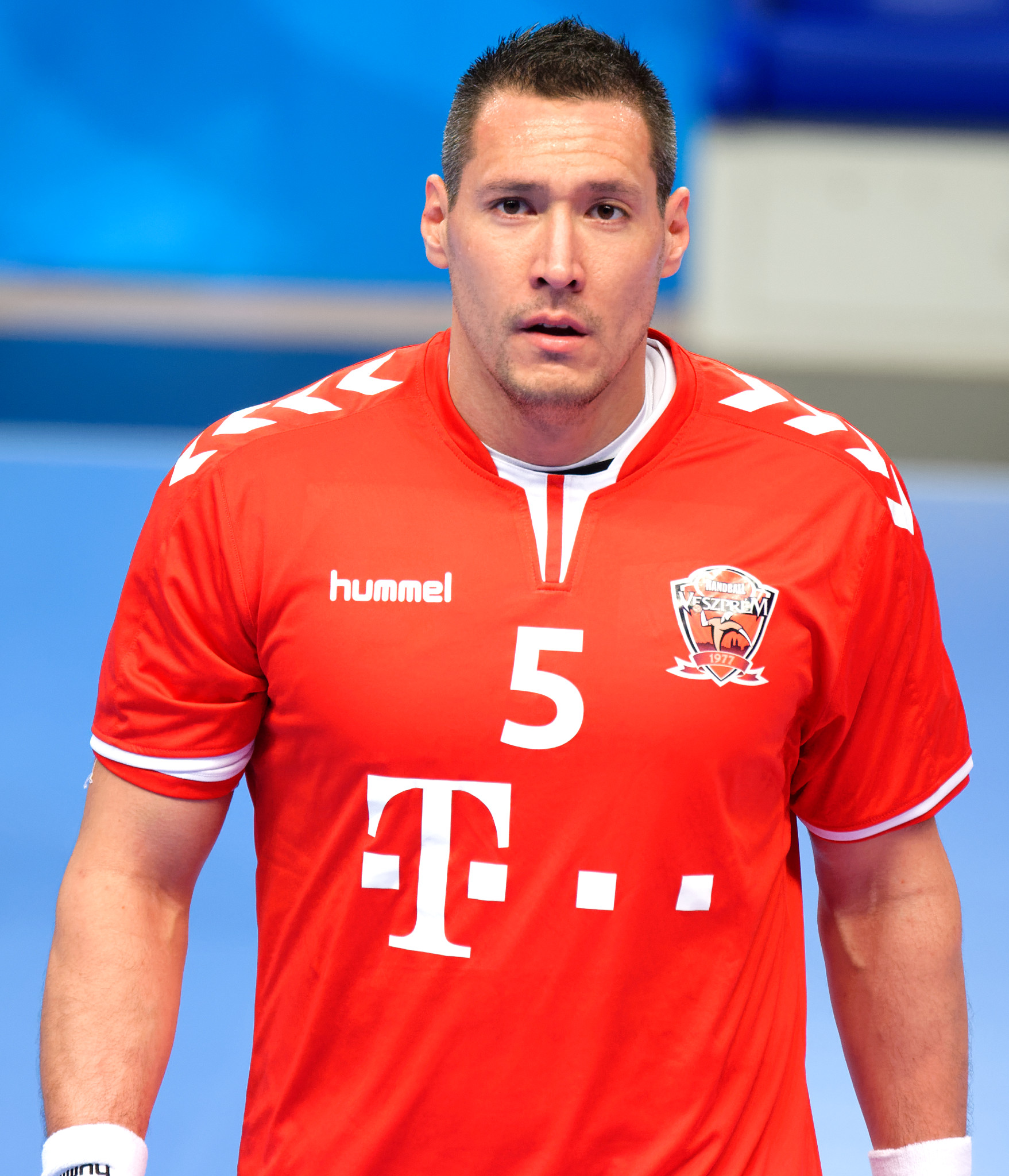

Personal information
- Full name: Timuzsin István Schuch
- Nationality: Hungarian
- Born: 5 June 1985 (age 41) Nagyatád, Hungary
- Height: 1.97 m (6 ft 6 in)

Sport
- Sport: Handball
- Position: Pivot
- Current club: Retired

Youth career
- Years: Team
- –2004: Veszprém KC

Senior clubs
- Years: Team
- 2004–2005: Veszprém KC
- 2004–2005: → Rinyamenti KC (loan)
- 2005–2007: ETO-SZESE Győr FKC
- 2005–2006: → Balatoni KC (loan)
- 2007–2011: HCM Constanța
- 2011–2018: Telekom Veszprém
- 2018–2021: Ferencvárosi TC
National team
Years	Team	Apps	(Gls)
2006–2019	Hungary	170	(80)
Medal record
Junior World Championship
Bronze medal – third place	2005 Hungary

Timuzsin Schuch (born 5 June 1985) is a former Hungarian handball player for the Hungarian national team.

He represented his country at five European Championships (2010, 2012, 2014, 2016, 2018), four World Championships (2011, 2013, 2017, 2019) and one Olympics (2012).

== Personal ==
His father is Hungarian, while his mother is Mongolian. The couple got to know each other in Budapest, where Schuch's mother studied.

His name, Timuzsin also refers to his Mongolian roots, as it was the birth name of Genghis Khan.

== Achievements ==
- Nemzeti Bajnokság I:
  - Winner: 2005, 2012, 2013, 2014, 2015, 2016, 2017
- Magyar Kupa:
  - Winner: 2012, 2013, 2014, 2015, 2016, 2017
- Liga Națională:
  - Winner: 2009, 2010
- Junior World Championship:
  - Bronze Medalist: 2005

== Individual awards ==
- Hungarian Best Defensive Player Of The Year: 2009, 2012, 2013, 2015, 2016
- Silver Cross of the Cross of Merit of the Republic of Hungary (2012)
- Best defender of EHF Champions League: 2013, 2014, 2016
