= János Szathmári =

Hungarian handball player (born 1969)

Personal information
- Full name: János Szathmári
- Nationality: Hungarian
- Born: 25 March 1969 (age 57) Nádudvar, Hungary
- Height: 1.85 m (6 ft 1 in)

Sport
- Sport: Handball
- Position: Goalkeeper
- Current club: Balatonfüredi KSE
- Number: 16

Senior clubs
- Years: Team
- –: Nádudvari SE
- –: Debreceni Dózsa
- 1995–2001: KC Veszprém
- 2001–2003: Dunaferr SE
- 2003–2005: Tatabánya-Carbonex KC
- 2005–2006: BM Valladolid
- 2006: Dunaferr SE
- 2007: PLER KC
- 2007–2013: Balatonfüredi KSE
National team
Years	Team	Apps	(Gls)
1988-2007	Hungary	303	(2)

János Szathmári (born 25 March 1969 in Nádudvar) is a Hungarian handball goalkeeper, who plays for Balatonfüredi KSE.

== Career ==
Szathmári started his career by his hometown club Nádudvari SE. Later, he played for Debreceni Dózsa, before moving to KC Veszprém, where he achieved his best results of his career with five Hungarian Championship and five Hungarian Cup titles. He also tried his hands in Spain, but just after one season he moved back to Hungary. He currently plays for Balatonfüredi KSE.

He is former Hungarian international, who has been capped 303 times. He participated on five World Championships (1993, 1995, 1997, 1999, 2003) and on four European Championships (1994, 1996, 1998, 2004). He was present at the 1992 Summer Olympics, where the Hungarian national team placed seventh, and at the 2004 Summer Olympics, where the team placed fourth.

He was picked for the World Selection together with his fellow countryman, István Pásztor in 2005 against Russia. The team of international stars, coached by the Sead Hasanefendić–Péter Kovács duo have won the match 37–33.

He helped the national team as a goalkeeping coach during the preparations for the 2010 European Championship.

== Individual awards ==
- Hungarian Handballer of the Year: 1998

== Personal ==
He has a daughter, Anna (b. 1993), who follows his father's path and plays as a handball goalkeeper.
