= József Bordás =

Hungarian handball player (born 1963)

József Bordás (June 2, 1963) is a Hungarian handball player. He participated at the 1988 Summer Olympics, where the Hungarian national team placed fourth. He was a silver medalist at the 1986 World Men's Handball Championship.
