= Sándor Vass =

Hungarian handball player (born 1946)

Sándor Vass (born August 11, 1946, in Budapest) is a Hungarian former handball player and coach.

In 1972 he was part of the Hungarian team which finished eighth in the Olympic tournament. He played all six matches and scored eleven goals. Eight years later he finished fourth with the Hungarian team in the 1980 Olympic tournament. He played all six matches and scored 16 goals.

He also appeared on two World Championships in 1970 and 1974, finishing eighth and seventh, respectively.

Vass has been the coach of the Hungarian men's national team between 1997 and 1999.

== Awards ==
- Hungarian Handballer of the Year: 1971
- Nemzeti Bajnokság I Top Scorer: 1969
