= János Fodor =

Hungarian handball player (born 1960)

János Fodor (born 1960) is a Hungarian handball player. He participated at the 1980 Summer Olympics and at the 1988 Summer Olympics, where he placed fourth with the Hungarian national team.
