= László Sótonyi =

Hungarian handball player (born 1970)

László Sótonyi (born 1970) is a Hungarian handball player and coach. He played for the Hungarian national team at the 1992 Summer Olympics, where the Hungarian team placed seventh.

Sótonyi is head coach for the club Csurgói KK, and second coach for the Hungarian national team.
