= Imre Bíró =

Hungarian handball player (born 1959)

Imre Bíró (born 1959) is a Hungarian handball player. He participated at the 1988 Summer Olympics, where the Hungarian national team placed fourth, and at the 1992 Summer Olympics, where the team placed seventh.

He has later coached the Hungarian women's club DVSC.
