= Igor Zubjuk =

Hungarian handball player (born 1961)

Igor Zubjuk (born 1961) is a Hungarian handball player. He was born in Kyiv, Ukraine. He played for the Hungarian national handball team and participated at the 1992 Summer Olympics, where Hungary placed 7th after beating the Romanian team in the final match.
