= Barna Putics =

Hungarian handball player (born 1984)

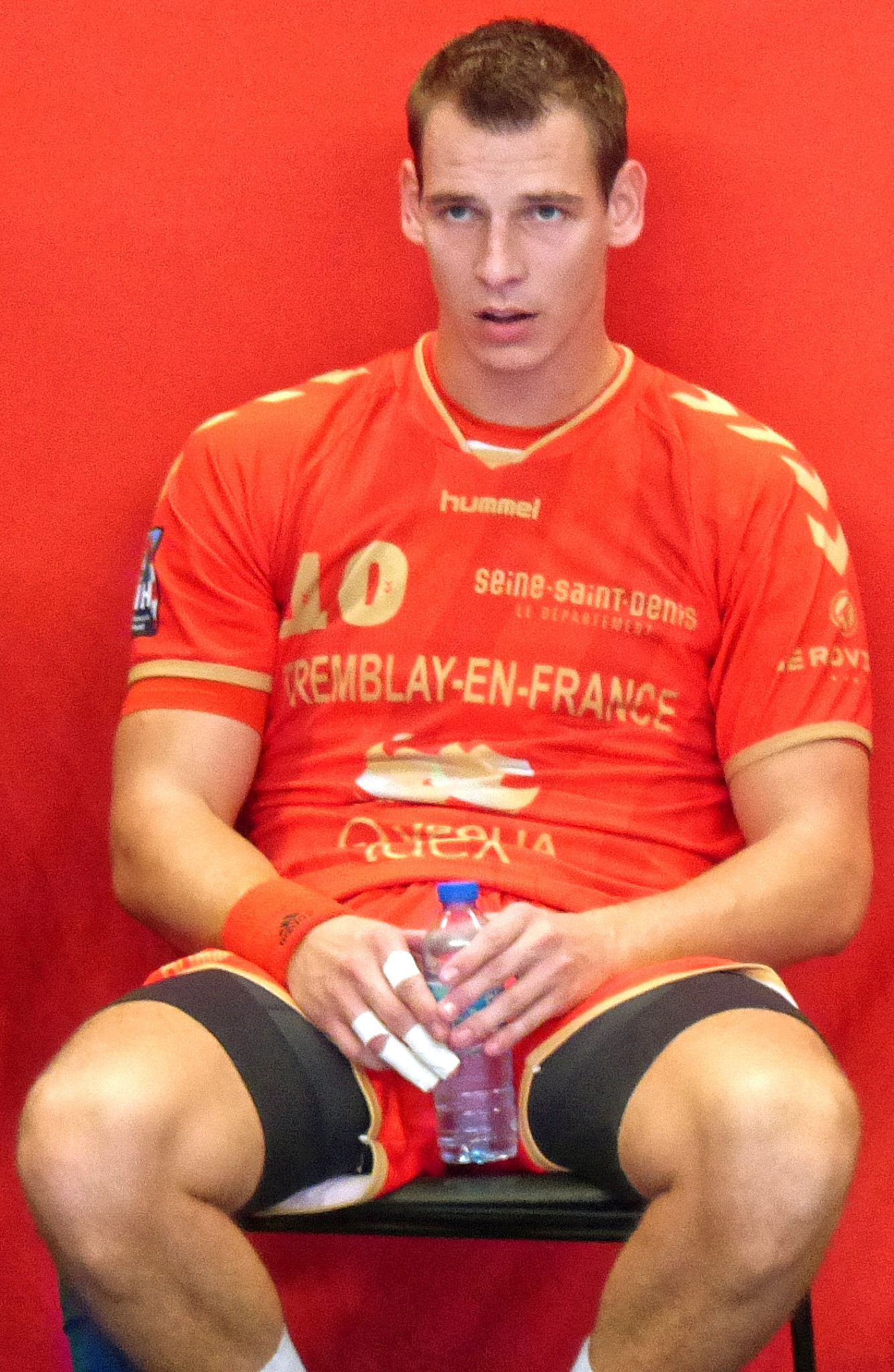

Personal information
- Nationality: Hungarian
- Born: 18 August 1984 (age 42) Pécs, Hungary
- Height: 2.01 m (6 ft 7 in)

Sport
- Sport: Handball
- Position: Left back

Senior clubs
- Years: Team
- 2004–2008: KC Veszprém
- loan: → Rinyamenti KC
- 2008: TUSEM Essen
- 2008: FC Barcelona Handbol
- 2008–2009: RK Koper
- 2009–2010: GWD Minden
- 2010–2014: VfL Gummersbach
- 2014–2016: Tremblay-en-France Handball
National team
Years	Team	Apps	(Gls)
2005–2016	Hungary	93	(193)

Barna Putics (born 18 August 1984) is a Hungarian handballer who plays for French top division team Tremblay-en-France Handball. He is also member of the Hungarian national team.

== Achievements ==
- Nemzeti Bajnokság I:
  - Winner: 2005, 2006, 2008
- Magyar Kupa:
  - Winner: 2005, 2007
- Slovenian Championship:
  - Runner-up: 2009
- Slovenian Cup:
  - Winner: 2009
- EHF Cup Winners' Cup:
  - Finalist: 2012

== Individual awards ==
- Silver Cross of the Cross of Merit of the Republic of Hungary (2012)
