= Szabolcs Zubai =

Hungarian handball player (born 1984)

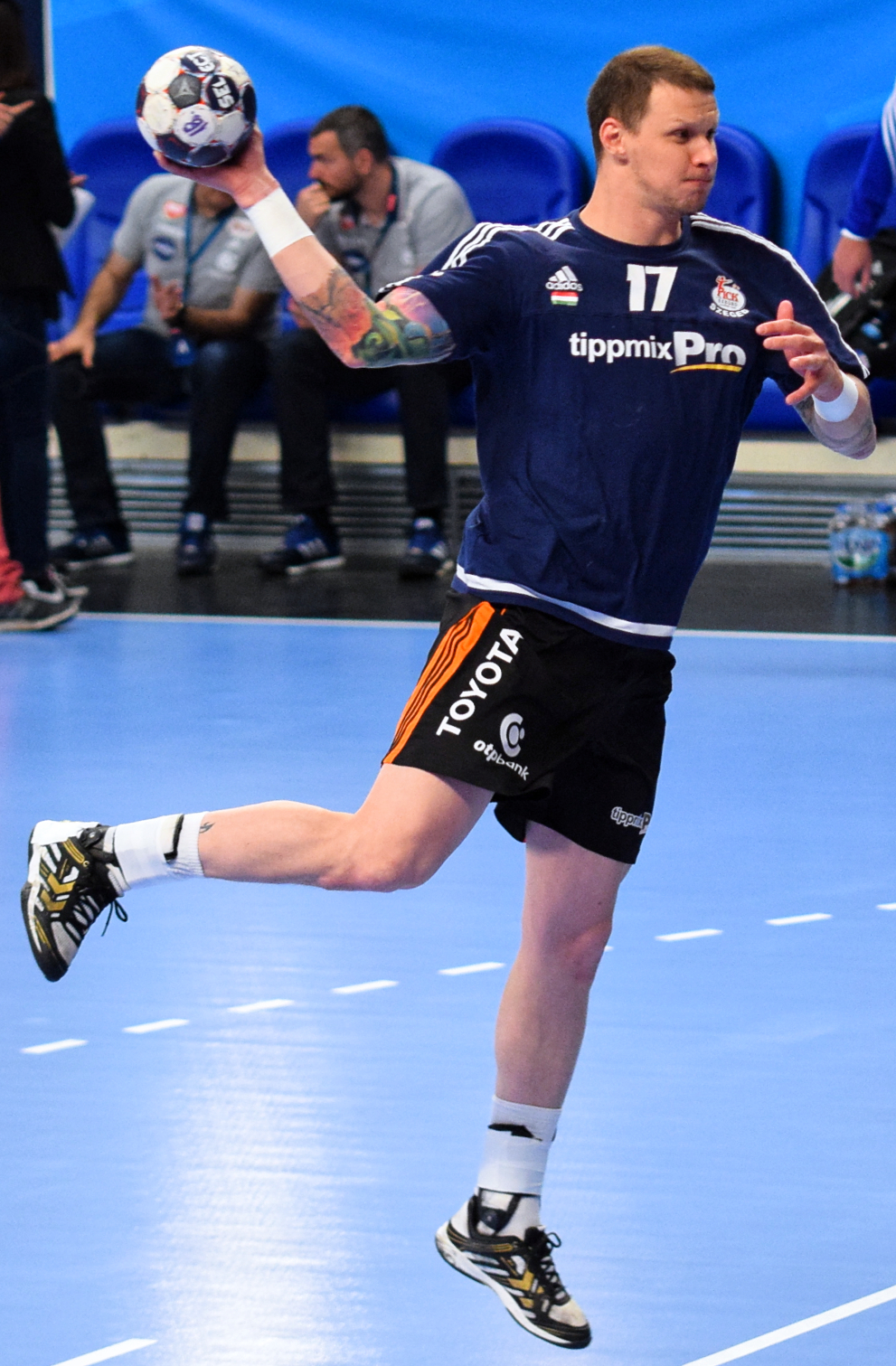

Personal information
- Nationality: Hungarian
- Born: 31 March 1984 (age 42) Mezőkövesd, Hungary
- Height: 1.91 m (6 ft 3 in)

Sport
- Sport: Handball
- Position: Pivot
- Current club: Orosházi FKSE-LINAMAR
- Number: 17

Senior clubs
- Years: Team
- 2001–2008: Dunaferr SE
- 2008–2018: SC Pick Szeged
- 2018–: Orosházi FKSE-LINAMAR
National team
Years	Team	Apps	(Gls)
2004–2017	Hungary	211	(308)
Medal record
Junior World Championship
Bronze medal – third place	2005 Hungary

Szabolcs Zubai (born 31 March 1984) is a Hungarian handballer for Orosházi FKSE-LINAMAR.

He made his full international debut on 27 December 2004 against Slovakia. He participated in his first major international tournament two year later, finishing thirteenth at the 2006 European Championship. He took part in further five European Championships (2008, 2010, 2012, 2014, 2016), four World Championships (2009, 2011, 2013, 2017) and an Olympics (2012).

== Achievements ==
- Nemzeti Bajnokság I:
  - Golden Medalist: 2018
  - Silver Medalist: 2009, 2010, 2011, 2012, 2013, 2014, 2015, 2016, 2017
  - Bronze Medalist: 2002, 2003, 2004, 2005, 2006, 2007, 2008
- Magyar Kupa:
  - Finalist: 2007, 2009, 2010, 2012, 2013, 2014, 2015, 2016, 2017, 2018
- EHF Cup:
  - Winner: 2014
- Junior World Championship:
  - Bronze Medalist: 2005

== Individual awards ==
- Silver Cross of the Cross of Merit of the Republic of Hungary (2012)
