= Attila Borsos =

Hungarian handball player (born 1966)

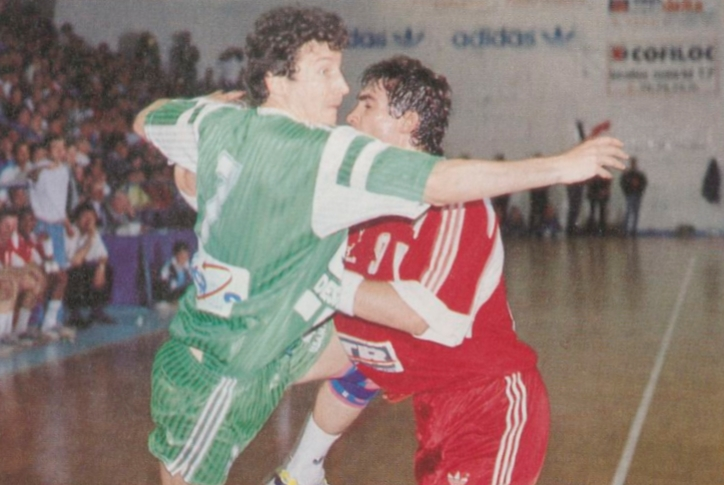
- Attila Borsos (1992)

Personal information
- Full name: Attila Borsos
- Nationality: Hungarian
- Born: 16 June 1966 (age 60) Budapest, Hungary
- Height: 1.85 m (6 ft 1 in)

Sport
- Sport: Handball
- Position: Right Winger
- Current club: Retired

Senior clubs
- Years: Team
- –1984: (Hungary) Budapest Spartacus
- 1984–1988: (Hungary) Tatabányai Bányász SC
- 1988–1990: (France) HBC Nantes
- 1990–1991: (Hungary) Tatabányai Bányász SC
- 1991–1992: (France) USAM Nîmes
- 1992–1994: (France) HB Saint-Brice 95
- 1994–2000: (France) SO Chambéry
- 2000–2002: (France) Villeurbanne HBA
- 2002–2003: (Hungary) Tatabánya Carbonex KC
National team
Years	Team	Apps	(Gls)
1986–1995	Hungary	135	(299)

Attila Borsos (born 6 June 1966) is a retired Hungarian handball player.

== Career ==
=== Club ===
He started his adult career with the Budapest Spartacus team in 1985. Even then, his talent was well visible, as he was expected to be the winger of the youth team on the team. He didn't even stay in Budapest for a long time, 1 year after his introduction he was certified in the NB I team of Tatabányai Bányász SC, who won the championship the previous year. At the same time, they could no longer repeat the previous results in Tatabánya. During his time there, the band was only good in fourth place, and they did not manage to reach the final in the Hungarian Cup either. In 1988, he decided to certify in France for HBC Nantes. In 1990, he played again in the Tatabányai Bányász SC for 1 year, and then played in France again with new impetus for 12 years. In 1991 on the USAM Nîmes team and then from ’92 to ’94 at HB Saint-Brice 95 in Paris. In 1994, he certified for the newly promoted SO Chambéry and remained here until 2000. It was here that he had his greatest success, as in 1998, 1999 and 2000, together with young Guillaume Gille and Bertrand Gille and Daniel Narcisse, he managed to lead Chambéry to second place in the championship. In 2000, he had to leave the scene of his success so far due to a muscle injury, but still remained in France, qualifying for the second division on the Villeurbanne HBA, Lyon. The chariot was still banging in its first year, finishing only in 10th place, but the following year (2001-2002) they had already won the championship. Attila no longer wanted to take on another first-class challenge, so he decided to move home to Tatabánya Carbonex KC. With the rookie Tatabánya Carbonex KC, he was ranked 5th in the championship, then retired.

=== National team ===
He drew attention to himself with his outstanding performance in Tatabánya, so he soon joined the national captain's team captain Lajos Mocsai. On November 7, 1986, at the Hungary-Austria match in Pécs, he was able to play for the Hungarian team, one of the strongest national teams in Europe and the world at the time (Hungary finished 2nd in the 1986 World Championship). He participated in the 1990 World Championship (6th place, 5 matches / 8 goals), the 1992 Olympic Games (7th place, 6 matches / 24 goals), the 1993 World Championship (11th place, 5 matches / 15 goals), the 1994 European Championship (7th place, 5 matches / 9 goals) and the 1995 World Championship (17-20th place, 4 matches / 4 goals).

== Honours ==
=== Club ===
SO Chambéry

- LNH Division 1
  - Silver: 1998, 1999, 2000

Villeurbanne HBA

- LNH Division 2
  - Gold: 2002

=== Individual ===
- LNH Division 2 Top Scorer: 1993

== Personal life ==
His wife, Edina Szabó, was also a Hungarian national handball player, later a successful coach. They had two children, Olivér Borsos (1990–2020) and Robin Borsos (1993).
In addition to his sports career, Attila Borsos graduated from the Faculty of Law of the University of Pécs; he studied project management in Marseilles, urban management and transport management in Paris.
