= Attila Vadkerti =

Hungarian handball player (born 1982)

Personal information
- Nationality: Hungarian
- Born: 22 February 1982 (age 44) Szeged, Hungary
- Height: 1.82 m (6 ft 0 in)

Sport
- Sport: Handball
- Position: Left wing

Senior clubs
- Years: Team
- 1999–2015: SC Pick Szeged
- 2015–2017: FKSE Algyő
National team
Years	Team	Apps	(Gls)
2004–2015	Hungary	94	(124)

Attila Vadkerti (born 22 February 1982) is a Hungarian handballer who plays for SC Pick Szeged and the Hungarian national team.

He made his international debut on 16 November 2004 against France.

Vadkerti competed in handball at the 2012 Summer Olympics.

== Achievements ==
- Nemzeti Bajnokság I:
  - Winner: 2007
  - Silver Medalist: 2002, 2003, 2004, 2005, 2006, 2008, 2009, 2010, 2011, 2012, 2013, 2014, 2015
  - Bronze Medalist: 2000, 2001
- Magyar Kupa:
  - Winner: 2006, 2008
  - Finalist: 2000, 2002, 2003, 2004, 2005, 2007, 2009, 2010, 2012, 2013, 2014, 2015
- EHF Cup:
  - Winner: 2014

== Individual awards ==
- Silver Cross of the Cross of Merit of the Republic of Hungary (2012)
