= Dávid Katzirz =

Hungarian handball player (born 1980)

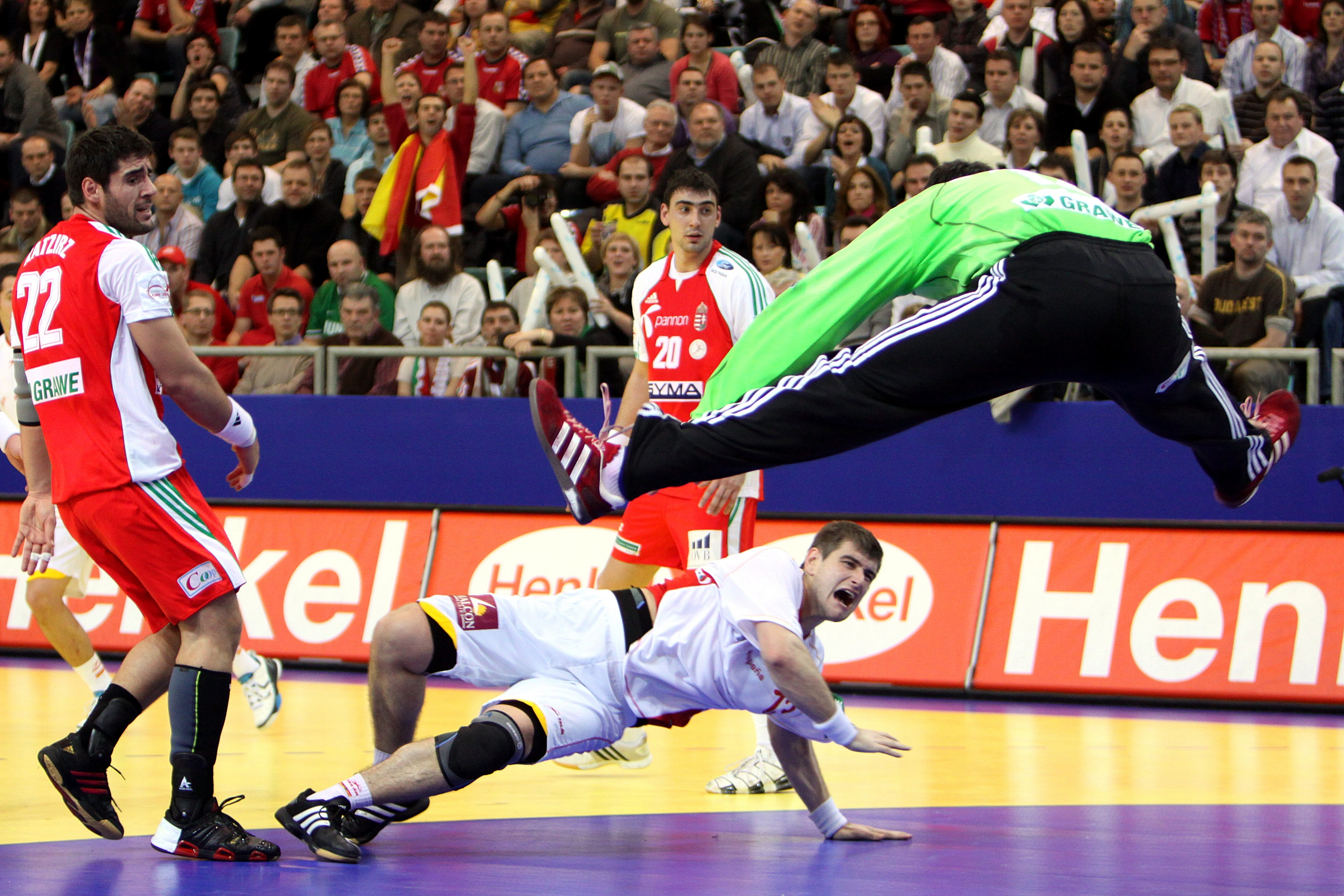

Personal information
- Full name: Dávid Katzirz
- Nationality: Hungarian
- Born: 25 June 1980 (age 46) Pécs, Hungary
- Height: 1.94 m (6 ft 4 in)

Sport
- Sport: Handball
- Position: Left Back
- Current club: Csurgói KK
- Number: 25

Senior clubs
- Years: Team
- 1998–2002: Pécsi KK
- 2002–2004: Dunaferr SE
- 2004–2005: Tatabánya-Carbonex KC
- 2005–2006: Pallamano Secchia
- 2006–2007: Wilhelmshavener HV
- 2007–2008: TUSEM Essen
- 2008–2011: SC Pick Szeged
- 2011: RK Zagreb
- 2011–: Csurgói KK
National team
Years	Team	Apps	(Gls)
–	Hungary	86	(123)
- Updated on 16 December 2011

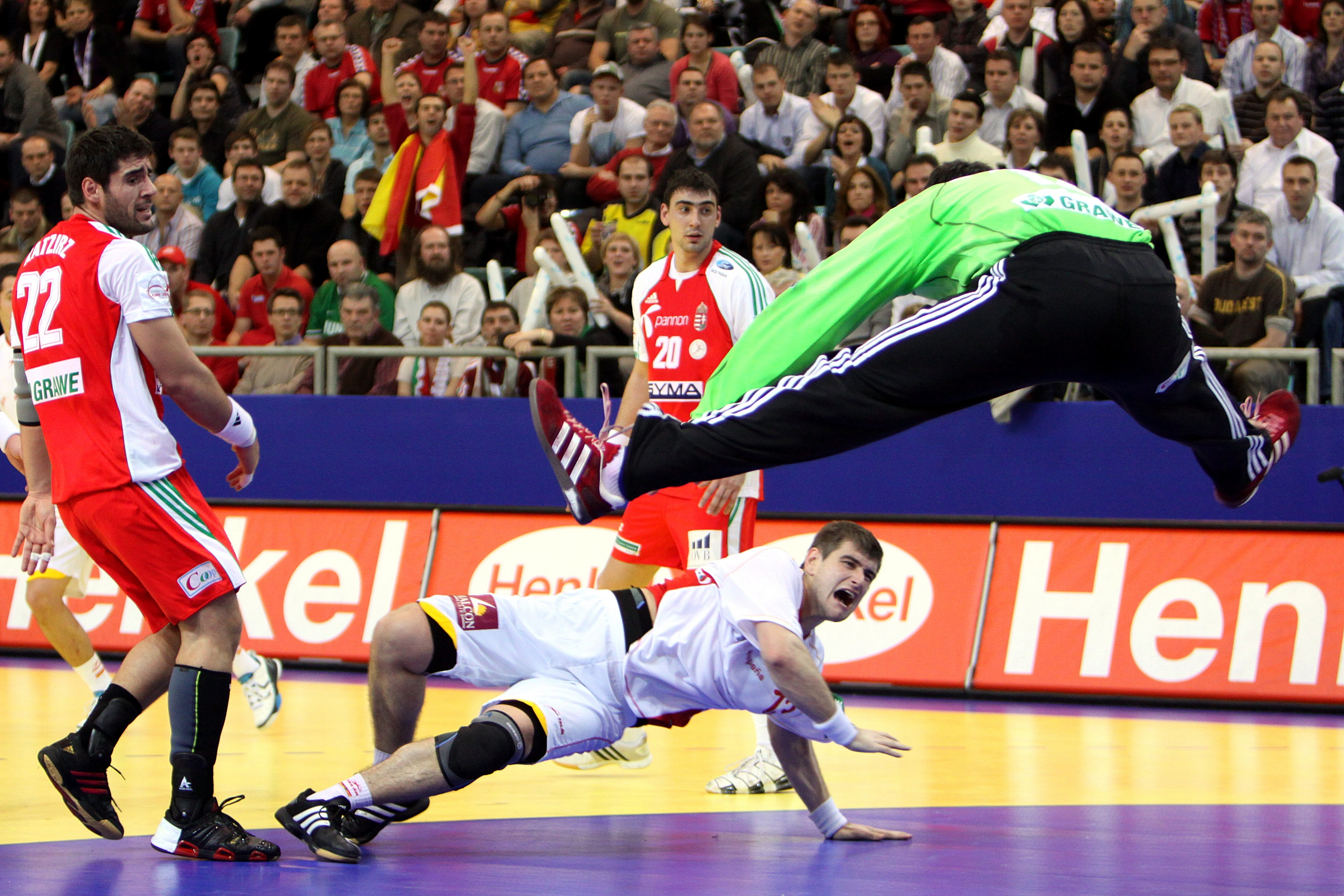
HUN - ESP (02) - 2010 European Men's Handball Championship.jpg

Dávid Katzirz (born 25 June 1980 in Pécs) is a Hungarian handballer who plays for Csurgói KK and the Hungarian national team.

He represented Hungary on four World Championships (2003, 2007, 2009, 2011) and participated on the European Championship in 2010 as well.

== Personal ==
His father, Béla Katzirz is a former Hungarian international footballer.

== Achievements ==
- Nemzeti Bajnokság I:
  - Silver Medalist: 2009, 2010, 2011
  - Bronze Medalist: 2003, 2004
- Magyar Kupa:
  - Finalist: 2009, 2010
- EHF Cup:
  - Semifinalist: 2003
