= István Pásztor (handballer) =

Hungarian handball player (born 1971)

Personal information
- Full name: István Pásztor
- Nationality: Hungarian
- Born: 5 June 1971 (age 55) Cegléd, Hungary
- Height: 1.92 m (6 ft 4 in)

Sport
- Sport: Handball
- Position: Left Wing

Senior clubs
- Years: Team
- –1993: Elektromos KC
- 1993–2008: KC Veszprém
- 2008–2014: Balatonfüredi KSE
National team
Years	Team	Apps
1988–2010	Hungary	215

István Pásztor (born 5 June 1971 in Cegléd) is a Hungarian handball player.

== Career ==
=== Club ===
From 1993 to 2008 he played for KC Veszprém, one of the most successful Hungarian clubs. During this period, he won twelve Hungarian Championship and eleven Hungarian Cup titles. He appeared in three continental cup finals. After being defeated by CD Bidasoa in the EHF Cup Winners' Cup finals in 1997, and losing by a three-goal aggregate difference against SC Magdeburg in the EHF Champions League five years later, he finally won the EHF Cup Winners' Cup in 2008. A few months later, in the summer of 2008, he moved to Balatonfüredi KSE.

=== International ===
He is a former Hungarian international, who has been capped 215 times. He participated on three World Championships (1993, 1997, 2003) and four European Championships (1994, 1996, 1998, 2004). He also competed at the 2004 Summer Olympics, where the Hungarian team placed fourth.

He played for the World Selection in 2005 against Russia, and helped the team of international stars with four goals to win the match 37–33. His national team mate János Szathmári also played for the team, that was coached by Sead Hasanefendić and Péter Kovács.

== Motorcycle accident ==
On 29 September 2010, Pásztor was involved in a traffic accident while riding a motorcycle that resulted in the death of an 80-year-old pedestrian. Legal proceedings followed, with initial sentencing and subsequent appeals.

The appellate court upheld the verdict on 28 November 2011. Pásztor was banned from driving for five years and required to pay court costs.

== Achievements ==
- Nemzeti Bajnokság I:
  - Winner: 1994, 1995, 1997, 1998, 1999, 2001, 2002, 2003, 2004, 2005, 2006, 2008
- Magyar Kupa:
  - Winner: 1994, 1995, 1996, 1998, 1999, 2000, 2002, 2003, 2004, 2005, 2007
- EHF Champions League:
  - Finalist: 2002
- EHF Cup Winners' Cup:
  - Winner: 2008
  - Finalist: 1997
- EHF Champions Trophy:
  - Finalist: 2002, 2008

== Individual awards ==
- Hungarian Handballer of the Year: 1996, 1999, 2001
