= Patrik Ligetvári =

Hungarian handball player (born 1996)

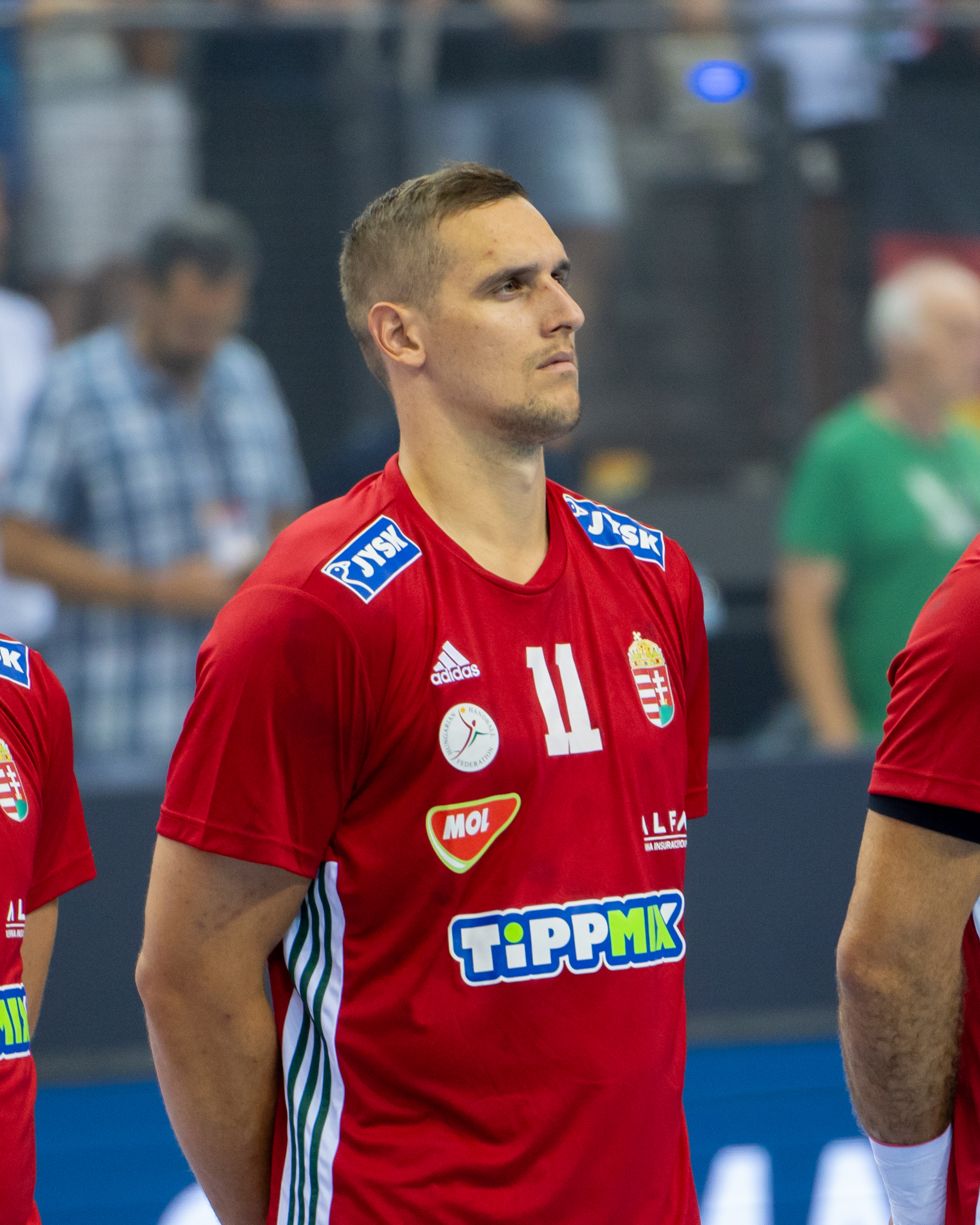

Personal information
- Nationality: Hungarian
- Born: 13 February 1996 (age 30) Várpalota, Hungary
- Height: 2.05 m (6 ft 9 in)

Sport
- Sport: Handball
- Position: Left back
- Current club: ONE Veszprém
- Number: 23

Senior clubs
- Years: Team
- 2012–: ONE Veszprém
- 2014–2016: → Balatonfüredi KSE (loan)
- 2018–2019: → Abanca Ademar León (loan)
- 2019–2020: → BM Logroño La Rioja (loan)
National team
Years	Team	Apps	(Gls)
2016–	Hungary	133	(100)
Medal record
Youth European Championship
Silver medal – second place	2014 Poland

Patrik Ligetvári (born 13 February 1996) is a Hungarian handball player for ONE Veszprém and the Hungarian national team.

He represented Hungary at the 2019 World Men's Handball Championship.

== Honours ==
=== National team ===
- Youth European Championship:
  - Silver: 2014

=== Individual ===
- Hungarian Adolescent Handballer of the Year: 2013
- The Best Defensive Player of the Youth European Championship: 2014
