= János Adorján =

Hungarian handball player (1938–1995)

János Adorján (January 30, 1938 in Budapest – December 15, 1995 in Budapest) was a Hungarian handball player who competed in the 1972 Summer Olympics.

In 1972 he was part of the Hungarian team which finished eighth in the Olympic tournament. He played all six matches and scored one goal.
