= Mihály Süvöltős =

Hungarian handball player (born 1949)

Mihály Süvöltős (born August 29, 1949, Újléta) is a former Hungarian handball player who competed in the 1976 Summer Olympics.

In 1976 he was part of the Hungarian team which finished sixth in the Olympic tournament. He played all five matches and scored seven goals.
