= István Marosi =

Hungarian handball player (1944-2018)

István Marosi (Hungarian pronunciation: [ˈiʃtvaːn ˈmɒroʃi]; 5 April 1944, Ózd – 31 January 2018) was a Hungarian handball player.

In 1972 he was part of the Hungarian team which finished eighth in the Olympic tournament. He played five matches and scored 14 goals.

Marosi also played on three World Championships in a row between 1964 and 1973, finishing eighth in all three occasions.

== Awards ==
- Hungarian Handballer of the Year: 1966
- Nemzeti Bajnokság I Top Scorer: 1968
