= Lajos Simó =

Hungarian handball player (1943–2019)

Lajos Simó (12 July 1943 – 16 September 2019) was a Hungarian handball player who competed in the 1972 Summer Olympics. He was born in Reghin.

In 1972 he was part of the Hungarian team which finished eighth in the Olympic tournament. He played all six matches and scored twelve goals. Simó also participated on three World Championships in row between 1967 and 1974, achieving his best result in the last one with a seventh place.

== Awards ==
- Hungarian Handballer of the Year: 1968, 1970, 1973
