= Alpár Jegenyés =

Hungarian handball player (born 1958)

Alpár Jegenyés (born 31 July 1958) is a Hungarian former handball player who competed in the 1980 Summer Olympics.

Jegenyés was born on 31 July 1958 in Pécs.

In 1980 he was part of the Hungarian team which finished fourth in the Olympic tournament. He played three matches.

Jegenyés lives in Emsdetten, Germany where he has a shop that sells Hungarian food and wine. He is also the coach of the second adult handball-team of the TV Emsdetten, whose first team is playing in the 1. Bundesliga of Germany since 2016.
