= László Szabó (handballer, born 1946) =

Hungarian handball player (1946–2024)

László Szabó (January 1, 1946 – November 22, 2024) was a Hungarian handball player who competed in the 1972 Summer Olympics. He was born in Csókakő. In 1972 he was part of the Hungarian team which finished eighth in the Olympic tournament. He played two matches.
