= Sándor Takács (handballer) =

Hungarian handball player (1947–2012)

Sándor Takács (20 August 1947 – September 2012) was a Hungarian former handball player who competed in the 1972 Summer Olympics. He was born in Budapest. In 1972 he was part of the Hungarian team which finished eighth in the Olympic tournament. He played all six matches.
