= Xavi Sabaté =

Spanish handball coach

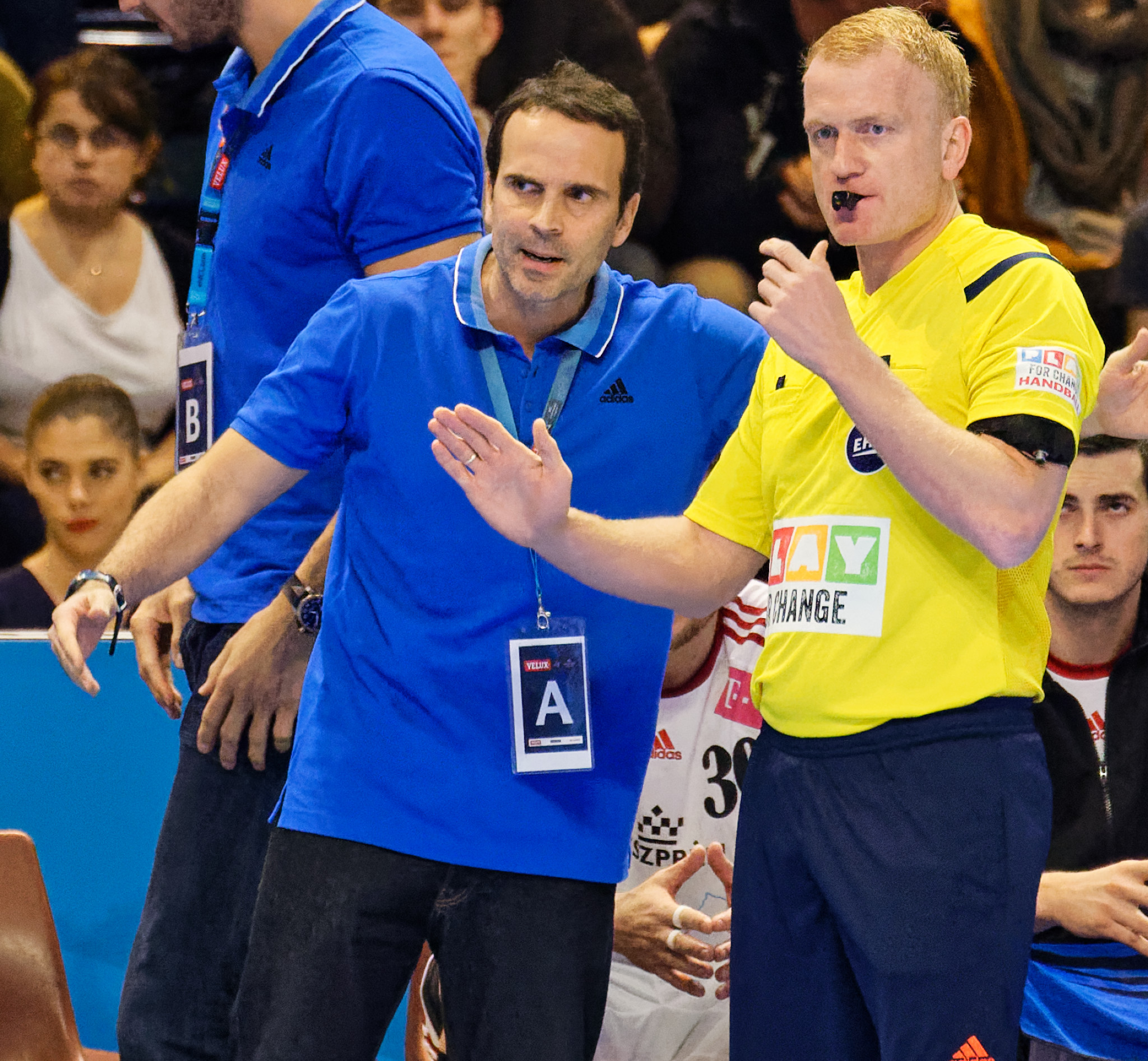

Personal information
- Nationality: Spanish
- Born: 15 August 1976 (age 50) Barcelona, Spain

Sport
- Sport: Handball
- Current club: Wisła Płock (manager)

Teams managed
- Years: Team
- 2010–2012: BM Antequera (assistant)
- 2012–2015: MKB-MVM Veszprém (assistant)
- 2015–2017: Telekom Veszprém
- 2016–2017: Hungary
- 2018–: Wisła Płock
- 2022–2025: Czech Republic

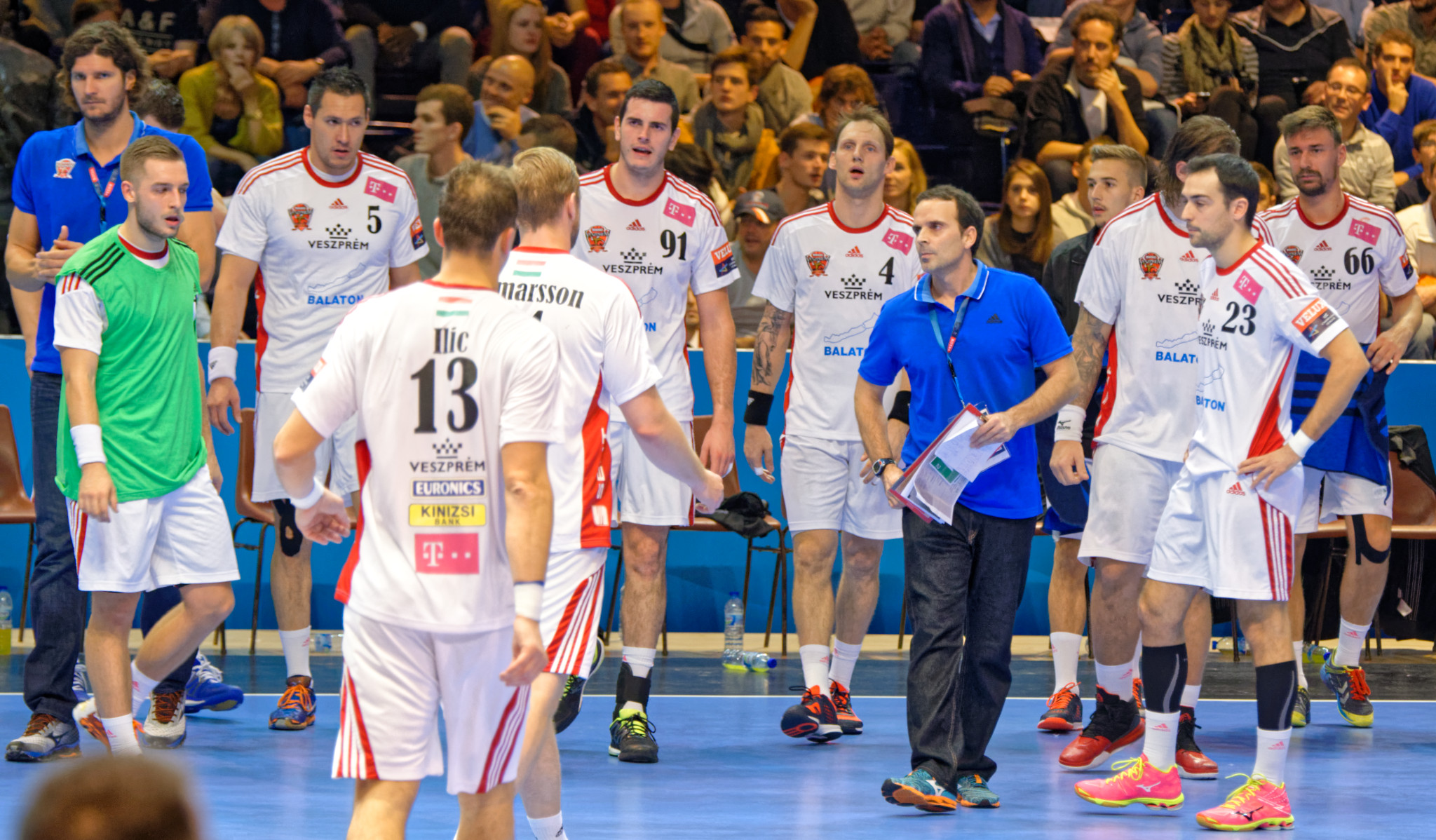
Xavi Sabaté in 2015

Javier Sabaté Cabiedes better known as Xavi Sabaté (born 15 August 1976) is a Spanish handball coach of Wisła Płock.

He coached Hungary at the 2017 World Men's Handball Championship. As well as Czech Republic at the 2024 European Men's Handball Championship and 2025 World Men's Handball Championship
