= János Gyurka =

Hungarian handball player (born 1962)

Medal record

Representing Hungary

Men's Handball

World Championship
Silver medal – second place	1986 Switzerland	Team

János Gyurka (born 18 March 1962 in Zirc) is a Hungarian handball former player and coach. He participated at the 1988 Summer Olympics, where the Hungarian national team placed fourth. He was a silver medalist at the 1986 World Men's Handball Championship. He is head coach for the club Mosonmagyaróvári KC SE.
