= László Jánovszki =

Hungarian handball player (born 1953)

László Jánovszki (born July 12, 1953, in Kondoros) is a former Hungarian handball player who competed in the 1976 Summer Olympics and in the 1980 Summer Olympics.

In 1976, Jánovszki was a part of the Hungarian team which finished sixth in the Olympic tournament. He played all five matches and scored one goal.

Four years later, Jánovszki finished fourth with the Hungarian team in the 1980 Olympic tournament. He played all six matches and scored three goals.

Jánovszki has 3 children: Reka, Csilla and Laszlo. He has been with his wife since 21 August 1976. Since finishing handball, Laszlo has moved to Leeds, in the United Kingdom, and has done great work with his wife working with children with cerebral palsy.
