= Mihály Kovács (handballer) =

Hungarian handball player (born 1957)

Medal record

Representing Hungary

Men's Handball

World Championship
Silver medal – second place	1986 Switzerland	Team

Mihály Kovács (born 10 September 1957 in Budapest) is a Hungarian former handball player. He participated on three World Championships between 1982 and 1990, and won silver medal at the 1986 World Championship. He also played at the 1988 Summer Olympics, where the Hungary national team placed fourth.

== Awards ==
- Hungarian Handballer of the Year: 1985, 1986
