= Ambrus Lele =

Hungarian handball player (born 1958)

Ambrus Lele (born August 19, 1958, in Szeged) is a former Hungarian handball player who competed in the 1980 Summer Olympics.

In 1980 he was part of the Hungarian team which finished fourth in the Olympic tournament. He played four matches and scored five goals.
