= János Csík =

Hungarian handball player (born 1946)

János Csík (born 20 December 1946 in Orosháza) is a former Hungarian handball player and handball coach.

In 1972 he was part of the Hungarian team which finished eighth in the 1972 Summer Olympics. He played in one match and scored two goals.
