= János Stiller =

Hungarian handball player (born 1946)

János Stiller (born 6 June 1946, in Budapest) is a Hungarian former handball player.

In 1972 he was part of the Hungarian team which finished eighth in the Olympic tournament. He played all six matches and scored eleven goals.

Stiller also participated on two World Championships in 1970 and 1974, finishing eighth and seventh respectively.

== Awards ==
- Hungarian Handballer of the Year: 1972
