= István Szilágyi =

Hungarian handball player (born 1950)

István Szilágyi (born October 6, 1950, in Tököl) is a Hungarian former handball player.

His first major international tournament was the 1974 World Championship, where he finished seventh with Hungary. He represented his country on further two World Championships in 1978 and 1982.

In 1976 he was part of the Hungarian team which finished sixth in the Olympic tournament. He played all five matches and scored fifteen goals. Four years later he finished fourth with the Hungarian team in the 1980 Olympic tournament. He played three matches and scored three goals.

== Awards ==
- Hungarian Handballer of the Year: 1976
