= Gábor Verőci =

Hungarian handball player (born 1953)

Gábor Verőci (born 22 October 1953 in Budapest) is a former Hungarian handball player who competed in the 1976 Summer Olympics.

In 1976 he was part of the Hungarian team which finished sixth in the Olympic tournament. He played all five matches as goalkeeper.
