= Ferenc Buday =

Hungarian handball player (born 1951)

Ferenc Buday (born January 29, 1951, in Budapest) is a Hungarian handball coach and former handball player who competed at the 1976 Summer Olympics.

In 1976 he was part of the Hungarian team which finished sixth in the Olympic tournament. He played all five matches and scored five goals.
