= Béla Bartalos =

Hungarian handball player (born 1948)

Béla Bartalos (born July 6, 1948, in Polgárdi) is a Hungarian former handball goalkeeper who competed on three Olympic Games and as many World Championships.

His first major tournament was the 1972 Olympic Games, where he played five matches for the Hungarian team, which took the eighth place. Four years later on the 1976 Olympic Games he finished sixth, having played on all five games. In 1980 he was a member of the Hungarian team once again, and gained the fourth place. He played on all six matches of the Olympic tournament.

He also participated on three World Championships between 1974 and 1982, achieving his best result in 1974 with a seventh place.

== Awards ==
- Hungarian Handballer of the Year: 1979
