= Ernő Gubányi =

Hungarian handball player (1950–2023)

Ernő Gubányi (13 October 1950 – 13 December 2023) was a Hungarian handball player who competed in the 1976 Summer Olympics and in the 1980 Summer Olympics. He was born in Salgótarján and died in Tatabánya.

In 1976 he was part of the Hungarian team which finished sixth in the Olympic tournament. He played all five matches and scored eleven goals. years later he finished fourth with the Hungarian team in the 1980 Olympic tournament. He played all six matches and scored five goals.

Gubányi died on 13 December 2023, at the age of 73.

== Awards ==
- Nemzeti Bajnokság I Top Scorer: 1970

== Sources ==
- Evans, Hilary; Gjerde, Arild; Heijmans, Jeroen; Mallon, Bill; et al. "Ernő Gubányi". Olympics at Sports-Reference.com. Sports Reference LLC. Archived from the original on 24 October 2012.
- Nemzetisport.hu (in Hungarian)
- Ernő Gubányi at Olympedia
