= László Szabó (handballer, born 1955) =

Hungarian handball player

László Szabó (September 21, 1955 – November 29, 2017) was a Hungarian handball player who competed in the 1980 Summer Olympics and in the 1988 Summer Olympics. In 1980 he was part of the Hungarian team which finished fourth in the Olympic tournament. He played all six matches and scored 13 goals. Eight years later he finished again fourth with the Hungarian team in the 1988 Olympic tournament. He played four matches and scored nine goals.
