= József Horváth (handballer) =

Hungarian handball player (1947–2022)

József Horváth (7 August 1947 – 30 September 2022) was a Hungarian handball player who competed in the 1972 Summer Olympics.

Horváth was born in Bátmonostor on 7 August 1947. In 1972, he was part of the Hungarian team which finished eighth in the Olympic tournament. He played four matches. He died in Madrid, Spain on 30 September 2022, at the age of 75.
