= Sándor Kaló =

Hungarian handball player and coach (1944–2020)

Sándor Kaló (16 March 1944 – 28 January 2020) was a Hungarian handball player and coach. He was born in Egyek.

He represented Hungary in the 1967 World Championship where he finished in eighth place. Three years later he participated in the next World Championship with the same results. In 1972 he played six games and scored 14 goals on the Olympic Games, helping his team to reach again the eighth place.

== Awards ==
- Hungarian Handballer of the Year: 1967, 1978
- Nemzeti Bajnokság I Top Scorer: 1967, 1969
