= 2023 IHF Men's U21 Handball World Championship squads =

This article displays the squads for the 2023 IHF Men's U21 Handball World Championship. Each team consisted of 18 players, of which 16 were fielded for each game.

Age, club, appearances and goals correct as of 20 June 2023.

== Group A ==
=== Croatia ===
A 18-player squad was announced on 9 June 2023.

Head coach: Andrija Nikolić

No.	Pos.	Name	Date of birth (age)	Height	App.	Goals	Club
1	GK	Dominik Kuzmanović	15 August 2002 (aged 20)	1.91 m	29	4	(Croatia) RK Nexe Našice
2	RW	Marin Božičević	25 February 2002 (aged 21)	1.81 m	19	60	(Croatia) RK Spačva Vinkovci
4	LW	Rok Malin	11 May 2003 (aged 20)	1.89 m	8	3	(Croatia) HRK Gorica
5	CB	Jakov Dujić	12 November 2003 (aged 19)	1.86 m	19	32	(Croatia) HRK Gorica
6	LB	Noa Zubac	26 June 2002 (aged 20)	1.92 m	11	33	(Poland) Vive Kielce
7	RW	Matija Car	15 October 2002 (aged 20)	1.89 m	17	39	(Croatia) RK Poreč
8	LW	Ivan Barbić	1 October 2002 (aged 20)	1.84 m	17	93	(Croatia) RK Dubrava
10	P	Matej Komljenović	30 April 2002 (aged 21)	1.88 m	21	18	(Croatia) RK Dubrava
13	LB	Patrik Hršak	14 July 2002 (aged 20)	1.94 m	21	79	(Croatia) MRK Sesvete
14	LB	David Štrković	31 January 2002 (aged 21)	2.03 m	14	9	(Croatia) MRK Sesvete
15	CB	Jan Kovačec	17 April 2002 (aged 21)	1.95 m	4	4	(Slovenia) RK Maribor Branik
16	GK	Matej Mandić	2 May 2002 (aged 21)	2.04 m	15	4	(Croatia) RK Zagreb
17	P	Zlatko Raužan	14 February 2002 (aged 21)	1.90 m	18	19	(Croatia) MRK Sesvete
23	CB	Marin Lisac	11 November 2002 (aged 20)	1.89 m	15	36	(Croatia) RK Dubrava
25	P	Patar Lulić	18 September 2002 (aged 20)	1.87 m	10	40	(Croatia) RK Bjelovar
26	CB	Tin Šestak	18 October 2003 (aged 19)	1.80 m	4	0	(Croatia) GRK Varaždin 1930
33	CB	Matej Vuleta	10 January 2002 (aged 21)	1.88 m	3	4	(Hungary) Budai Farkasok KKUK
35	GK	Mislav Turčić	14 October 2002 (aged 20)	1.90 m	11	0	(Croatia) HRK Gorica

=== France ===
A 18-player squad was announced on 1 June 2023.

Head coach: Yohan Delattre

No.	Pos.	Name	Date of birth (age)	Height	App.	Goals	Club
2	RW	Oreste Vescovo	4 January 2003 (aged 20)	1.86 m	21	31	(Finland) Riihimäki Cocks
3	RW	Valentin Bzdynga	19 July 2002 (aged 20)	1.84 m	18	47	(France) Paris Saint-Germain Handball
4	CB	Baptiste Clay	14 August 2002 (aged 20)	1.91 m	32	80	(France) Paris Saint-Germain Handball
5	LW	Auguste Longérinas	3 April 2003 (aged 20)	1.88 m	17	32	(France) US Ivry Handball
6	CB	Mattéo Fadhuile-Crepy	14 May 2002 (aged 21)	1.85 m	30	138	Tremblay-en-France Handball
7	LW	Guéric Vincent	18 August 2002 (aged 20)	1.80 m	24	109	(France) USAM Nîmes Gard
8	RB	Hugo Pimenta	3 May 2003 (aged 20)	1.85 m	31	107	(France) Sélestat Alsace Handball
10	LB	Doran Engueleguele	10 May 2003 (aged 20)	1.93 m	3	2	(France) Dunkerque Handball Grand Littoral
11	RB	Alexis Berthier	12 March 2002 (aged 21)	1.92 m	19	24	(France) Montpellier Handball
15	LB	Thibault Chevalier	15 April 2002 (aged 21)	1.87 m	18	33	(France) Massy Essonne Handball
16	GK	Léo Villain	6 November 2002 (aged 20)	2.04 m	24	6	(France) Paris Saint-Germain Handball
19	LB	Wallem-Konrad Peleka	18 January 2002 (aged 21)	2.00 m	30	78	(France) Paris Saint-Germain Handball
22	P	Gautier Loredon	15 October 2002 (aged 20)	2.00 m	17	30	(France) Paris Saint-Germain Handball
23	P	Sacha Mantz	19 June 2002 (aged 21)	1.98 m	13	6	(France) Chambéry Savoie Mont-Blanc Handball
26	LB	Maxime Discamps	3 July 2003 (aged 19)	2.03 m	0	0	(France) Fenix Toulouse Handball
59	GK	Quentin Hulot	19 September 2002 (aged 20)	1.98 m	16	0	(France) Strasbourg Eurométropole Handball
90	P	Imanol Carrère	21 April 2003 (aged 20)	1.95 m	21	29	(France) US Ivry Handball
99	GK	Kalim Zahaf	30 June 2002 (aged 20)	1.89 m	13	0	(France) JS Cherbourg Manche Handball

=== Poland ===
A 16-player squad was announced on 18 June 2023.

Head coach: Zygmunt Kamys

No.	Pos.	Name	Date of birth (age)	Height	App.	Goals	Club
2	P	Wiktor Karpiński	18 March 2003 (aged 20)	1.99 m	17	12	(Poland) MKS Kalisz
7	RB	Marcel Nowak	7 February 2002 (aged 21)	1.96 m	10	33	(Germany) 1. VfL Potsdam
11	P	Paweł Stempin	3 July 2003 (aged 19)	1.97 m	0	0	(Poland) Gwardia Opole
13	RW	Tomasz Kosznik	12 April 2002 (aged 21)	1.82 m	12	32	(Poland) SPR Chrobry Głogów
14	LB	Jakub Powarzyński	7 September 2002 (aged 20)	1.92 m	13	30	(Poland) Wybrzeże Gdańsk
16	GK	Jakub Ałaj	29 June 2002 (aged 20)	2.01 m	10	10	(Poland) Gwardia Opole
17	LB	Igor Graczyk	15 April 2002 (aged 21)	1.92 m	14	20	(Poland) Stal Mielec
19	CB	Paweł Krawczyk	10 July 2003 (aged 19)	1.93 m	10	16	(Poland) Górnik Zabrze
21	LB	Dawid Molski	26 February 2002 (aged 21)	1.85 m	14	31	(Poland) Górnik Zabrze
34	LB	Piotr Mielczarski	31 August 2005 (aged 17)	1.96 m	4	9	(Poland) UKS Bursa Puławy
42	CB	Jakub Będzikowski	25 January 2003 (aged 20)	1.88 m	14	40	(Poland) Wybrzeże Gdańsk
47	P	Jakub Sladkowski	14 October 2004 (aged 18)	1.97 m	4	9	(Poland) Górnik Zabrze
55	RW	Patryk Krok	5 March 2002 (aged 21)	1.79 m	5	6	(Poland) Pogoń Szczecin
75	GK	Marcel Jastrzębski	14 March 2003 (aged 20)	1.95 m	7	0	(Poland) Wisła Płock
77	RB	Patryk Wasiak	31 October 2004 (aged 18)	1.93 m	4	12	(Poland) Vive Kielce
99	LW	Szymon Wiaderny	25 May 2003 (aged 20)	1.89 m	17	53	(Poland) Vive Kielce

=== United States ===
A 18-player squad was announced on 13 June 2023.

Head coach: Danilo Rojevic

No.	Pos.	Name	Date of birth (age)	Height	App.	Goals	Club
1	GK	Mattia Cercola	16 August 2005 (aged 17)	1.80 m	5	0	(Poland) UKPR Agrykola Warszawa
2	RW	Gary Phillips	24 January 2003 (aged 20)	1.89 m	0	0	(United States) West Point Team Handball
3	CB	Samuel Proctor	18 March 2002 (aged 21)	1.85 m	0	0	(United States) West Point Team Handball
4	RW	Loic Karrer	26 September 2002 (aged 20)	1.82 m	4	18	(France) Antibes Handball
5	RB	Mark Miller	26 March 2002 (aged 21)	1.94 m	6	30	(United States) West Point Team Handball
6	CB	Matisse Walker	22 October 2002 (aged 20)	1.83 m	0	0	(France) ISSY Handball Masculin
7	LB	Ole Markus Strømmen	10 February 2003 (aged 20)	1.83 m	0	0	(Norway) Skogn IL
8	LW	Evan Gordon	4 May 2005 (aged 18)	1.80 m	2	7	(Germany) SV 64 Zweibrücken
9	CB	Elliot Robertson	10 June 2003 (aged 20)	1.75 m	4	16	(Sweden) Lödde Vikings HK
10	CB	Dániel Hunyadi	20 October 2003 (aged 19)	1.92 m	0	0	(United States) West Point Team Handball
11	CB	Benjamin Edwards	1 October 2006 (aged 16)	1.85 m	5	33	(Hungary) BFKA Veszprém
12	GK	Mahmoud Hashim	15 August 2002 (aged 20)	1.85 m	1	0	(Egypt) Al Mokawloon Al Arab SC
14	LB	Nepomuk Grabner	16 May 2005 (aged 18)	1.86 m	0	0	(Austria) Förthof UHK Krems
15	P	Connor Reed	19 February 2003 (aged 20)	1.88 m	0	0	(United States) Carolina THC
16	GK	Grayson Wide	10 June 2004 (aged 19)	1.85 m	0	0	(Sweden) Skuru IK
17	RB	Tristan Morawski	12 March 2005 (aged 18)	1.98 m	2	0	(Germany) Rellinger Turnverein
19	LB	Maksim McCauley	9 April 2005 (aged 18)	1.91 m	1	0	(Estonia) HC Kehra
31	LW	Oliver Edwards	8 September 2003 (aged 19)	1.82 m	0	0	(Hungary) Tatabánya KC

== Group B ==
=== Algeria ===
Head coach: Abderrahmane Hadj

No.	Pos.	Name	Date of birth (age)	Height	App.	Goals	Club
1	GK	Houssem Boudemagh	2 March 2002 (aged 21)	1.86 m	6	3	(Algeria) HBC El-Biar
3	RB	Adlène Chaib	15 November 2003 (aged 19)	1.88 m	4	10	(Algeria) Jeunesse sportive espérance de Skikda
5	P	Noureddine Fetaissa	24 May 2002 (aged 21)	1.93 m	2	5	(Algeria) Jeunesse sportive espérance de Skikda
6	CB	Chems-Eddine Lakikza	21 October 2002 (aged 20)	1.87 m	1	2	(Algeria) Jeunesse sportive espérance de Skikda
7	CB	Abdelhafid Khettaf	8 June 2002 (aged 21)	1.78 m	6	12	(Algeria) Chabab Riadi Baladiat Baraki
9	LB	Ramy Sidi Aissa	24 August 2002 (aged 20)	1.91 m	7	26	(Algeria) HBC El-Biar
10	RB	Nidhal Eddine Badie Blida	27 November 2002 (aged 20)	1.90 m	7	20	(Algeria) Chabab Bordj Bou Arreridj
16	GK	Chouaib Djoulah	23 June 2002 (aged 20)	1.81 m	6	3	(Algeria) Chabab Riadi Baladiat Baraki
17	P	Mohamed Abderraouf Sadi	9 October 2002 (aged 20)	1.98 m	6	12	(Algeria) HBC El-Biar
19	CB	Amdjed Haouia	9 September 2002 (aged 20)	1.80 m	6	15	(Algeria) HBC Mila
24	LW	Aissa Hadef	20 April 2002 (aged 21)	1.93 m	6	10	(Algeria) MC Alger
41	CB	Rabah Racim Meddahi	29 November 2002 (aged 20)	1.90 m	7	40	(Algeria) HBC El-Biar
55	P	Nasrellah Harzallah	4 June 2002 (aged 21)	1.88 m	6	16	(Algeria) Chabab Bordj Bou Arreridj
63	GK	Salim Mezaza	26 January 2004 (aged 19)	1.94 m	9	4	(Algeria) HBC El-Biar
66	LW	Amir Ansel	26 June 2002 (aged 20)	1.80 m	6	8	(Algeria) Mouloudia Club de Saïda
77	LW	Ahmed Lamine Cherif	19 January 2002 (aged 21)	1.87 m	6	25	(Algeria) Chabab Riadi Baladiat Baraki
89	RB	Mohamed Lamine Boucharabine	13 April 2002 (aged 21)	1.87 m	6	10	(Algeria) Chabab Riadi Baladiat Baraki
99	RW	Adem Boussouar	30 January 2002 (aged 21)	1.76 m	6	8	(Algeria) HBC Mila

=== Germany ===
A 18-player squad was announced on 12 June 2023.

Head coach: Martin Heuberger

No.	Pos.	Name	Date of birth (age)	Height	App.	Goals	Club
1	GK	David Späth	29 April 2002 (aged 21)	2.02 m	7	3	(Germany) Rhein-Neckar Löwen
2	LW	Tim Freihöfer	21 August 2002 (aged 20)	1.74 m	17	71	(Germany) Füchse Berlin
3	CB	Nils Lichtlein	31 July 2002 (aged 20)	1.83 m	7	26	(Germany) Füchse Berlin
4	RW	Mathis Häseler	25 June 2002 (aged 20)	1.89 m	4	8	(Germany) VfL Gummersbach
5	CB	Moritz Sauter	3 January 2003 (aged 20)	1.86 m	4	15	(Germany) 1. VfL Potsdam
7	RW	Stephan Seitz	12 January 2002 (aged 21)	1.93 m	17	36	(Germany) HC Erlangen
8	LB	Matthes Langhoff	30 March 2002 (aged 21)	1.93 m	12	39	(Germany) Füchse Berlin
9	CB	Ole Pregler	26 May 2002 (aged 21)	1.92 m	3	4	(Germany) VfL Gummersbach
10	LW	Florian Kranzmann	9 September 2002 (aged 20)	1.92 m	14	35	(Germany) GWD Minden
11	LB	Niclas Heitkamp	2 February 2003 (aged 20)	1.92 m	5	24	(Germany) SC DHfK Leipzig
12	GK	Lasse Ludwig	29 September 2002 (aged 20)	1.94 m	16	1	(Germany) Füchse Berlin
13	RB	Renārs Uščins	29 April 2002 (aged 21)	1.88 m	19	42	(Germany) TSV Hannover-Burgdorf
14	P	Christian Wilhelm	13 April 2002 (aged 21)	1.91 m	17	35	(Germany) HC Empor Rostock
15	P	Justus Fischer	6 February 2003 (aged 20)	1.94 m	17	50	(Germany) TSV Hannover-Burgdorf
19	RB	Max Christoph Beneke	27 May 2003 (aged 20)	1.98 m	10	31	(Germany) 1. VfL Potsdam
20	CB	Sören Steinhaus	15 December 2003 (aged 19)	1.98 m	14	26	(Germany) TSV Bayer Dormagen
21	P	Mika Sajenev	30 July 2003 (aged 19)	2.04 m	5	6	(Germany) SC DHfK Leipzig
23	RB	Elias Scholtes	17 August 2003 (aged 19)	1.90 m	12	36	(Germany) Bergischer HC

=== Libya ===
Head coach: Hedi Guiga

No.	Pos.	Name	Date of birth (age)	Height	App.	Goals	Club
2	P	Khalid El-Ahrash	9 August 2002 (aged 20)	1.78 m	7	13	(Libya) Al Ahli Tripoli
5	P	Abdullah Buojaylah	5 December 2003 (aged 19)	1.85 m	9	13	(Libya) Almoroj Club
8	CB	Karshman Al-Muetasim	18 October 2002 (aged 20)	1.77 m	12	11	(Libya) Aljazeera
9	LB	Mohammed Al-Shuwayhidi	17 March 2004 (aged 19)	1.85 m	8	12	(Libya) Al Hilal
10	RB	Abdullah Hireebish	10 April 2002 (aged 21)	1.75 m	0	0	(Libya) Al Mashael
11	RW	Wael Irwayhah	19 March 2002 (aged 21)	1.75 m	11	17	(Libya) Aljazeera
12	GK	Yousef Gharor	4 February 2002 (aged 21)	1.78 m	9	0	(Libya) Al-Ahly Benghazi
13	CB	Muetazballlah Yahy	1 February 2005 (aged 18)	1.77 m	5	5	(Libya) Aljazeera SC
14	RB	Hammam Ali	8 July 2004 (aged 18)	1.76 m	0	0	(Libya) Al-Ittihad Tripoli
15	RB	Muwayyid Al-Shibli	25 April 2002 (aged 21)	1.70 m	0	0	(Libya) Al Ahli Tripoli
16	GK	Abd Alraouf Al-Abasi	17 October 2002 (aged 20)	1.77 m	8	0	(Libya) Al Ahli Tripoli
32	P	Muamer Ibrahim	23 April 2002 (aged 21)	1.77 m	9	8	(Libya) Aljazeera
33	CB	Shatshout Al-Muntasir	29 March 2002 (aged 21)	1.80 m	9	11	(Libya) Al Mashael
35	RW	Mohammed Abduljalil	23 November 2002 (aged 20)	1.70 m	6	5	(Libya) Almoroj Club
63	GK	Zakariya Al-Shaykhi	10 July 2003 (aged 19)	1.77 m	9	0	(Libya) Al-Ahly Benghazi
77	RW	Mahmoud Saeid	17 August 2002 (aged 20)	1.65 m	0	0	(Libya) Garyounis Club
88	LB	Amyn Ghareebah	15 October 2002 (aged 20)	1.70 m	9	6	(Libya) Aljazeera
99	RB	Ahmed Abdalla	21 June 2004 (aged 18)	1.80 m	0	0	(Libya) Al-Ahly Benghazi

=== Tunisia ===
Head coach: Zouheir Messaoud

No.	Pos.	Name	Date of birth (age)	Height	App.	Goals	Club
1	GK	Mohamed Aziz Jemâa	29 July 2002 (aged 20)	1.88 m	5	0	(Tunisia) Aigle sportif de Téboulba
3	LW	Anis Ben Salem	11 January 2003 (aged 20)	1.90 m	10	14	(Tunisia) El Makarem de Mahdia
5	P	Kallel Maher	13 May 2004 (aged 19)	1.94 m	6	2	(Tunisia) El Baath sportif de Béni Khiar
7	RW	Mohamed Aziz	1 January 2003 (aged 20)	1.90 m	5	21	(Tunisia) Al Ain
9	P	Adem Bouguerra	6 January 2002 (aged 21)	1.89 m	36	28	(Tunisia) Espérance Sportive de Tunis
12	GK	Moutiaa Limem Dit Liouane	23 August 2003 (aged 19)	1.94 m	16	1	(Tunisia) Club Africain
13	CB	Amine Ben Salem	11 January 2003 (aged 20)	1.90 m	10	13	(Tunisia) El Makarem de Mahdia
19	RW	Abdelmajid Gabsi	19 October 2003 (aged 19)	1.80 m	10	12	(Tunisia) Association Sportive d'Hammamet
21	LW	Rayen Seghaier	22 July 2002 (aged 20)	1.81 m	36	122	(Tunisia) Étoile Sportive du Sahel
22	CB	Ouissem Snoussi	15 March 2002 (aged 21)	1.78 m	35	107	(Tunisia) Étoile Sportive du Sahel
33	RB	Yassine Ben Salem	11 January 2003 (aged 20)	1.92 m	23	25	(France) C' Chartres Métropole
39	LB	Kousay Ben Fraj	2 September 2004 (aged 18)	1.92 m	10	13	(Tunisia) El Baath sportif de Béni Khiar
50	RB	Islem Hakkouna	14 February 2002 (aged 21)	1.90 m	11	16	(Tunisia) Union sportive de Gremda
71	CB	Abdelatif Mounib Ben Hadj	7 September 2003 (aged 19)	1.89 m	10	26	(Tunisia) Aigle sportif de Téboulba
72	P	Mohamed Aziz Ben Hamouda	7 December 2002 (aged 20)	1.86 m	25	72	(Tunisia) Association Sportive d'Hammamet
90	LB	Dhia Eddine Sayeh	23 May 2002 (aged 21)	2.20 m	19	33	(Tunisia) Club Africain

== Group C ==
=== Brazil ===
Head coach: Drean Dutra

No.	Pos.	Name	Date of birth (age)	Height	App.	Goals	Club
3	LW	Ruan Almeida	27 May 2003 (aged 20)	1.77 m	4	6	(Brazil) Associação Desportiva Itajaiense
4	RW	Michael Quintino	1 January 2003 (aged 20)	1.86 m	0	0	(Brazil) Associação Desportiva Itajaiense
5	LW	Caio Morais	21 August 2002 (aged 20)	1.90 m	0	0	(Brazil) Praia Clube Uberlândia
6	LB	Cauê Souza	30 July 2003 (aged 19)	1.90 m	4	5	(Brazil) Praia Clube Uberlândia
8	RB	Giancarlo Henn	18 September 2002 (aged 20)	1.92 m	4	5	(Brazil) Associação Desportiva Itajaiense
10	P	Gabriel Griggio	9 June 2003 (aged 20)	1.77 m	4	8	(Brazil) Esporte Clube Pinheiros
12	GK	Luiz Vieira	21 May 2002 (aged 21)	1.87 m	5	0	(Brazil) Associação Desportiva São José
14	RB	Gabriel Rosa	30 April 2002 (aged 21)	1.80 m	4	8	(Brazil) Associação Desportiva Itajaiense
15	CB	Nhauã Castro	20 June 2003 (aged 20)	1.80 m	0	0	(Brazil) Praia Clube Uberlândia
17	RW	Samir Fróes	23 May 2002 (aged 21)	1.77 m	4	8	(Brazil) Praia Clube Uberlândia
19	P	Pedro Sosa	20 September 2003 (aged 19)	1.97 m	4	7	(Brazil) Associação Desportiva Itajaiense
30	CB	Davi Langaro	4 March 2002 (aged 21)	1.88 m	4	5	(Brazil) Esporte Clube Pinheiros
31	LW	Mateus Frias	10 February 2002 (aged 21)	1.80 m	4	6	(Brazil) Associação Maringaense de Handebol
33	P	Nícolas Ribera	11 July 2003 (aged 19)	1.90 m	0	0	(Brazil) ACISEG
77	GK	William Santos	14 July 2002 (aged 20)	1.89 m	4	0	(Brazil) Esporte Clube Pinheiros
83	LW	Hugo Monta	6 April 2003 (aged 20)	1.92 m	6	17	(Brazil) Esporte Clube Pinheiros

=== Costa Rica ===
Head coach: Hanner Parra

No.	Pos.	Name	Date of birth (age)	Height	App.	Goals	Club
1	GK	Jared Campos	10 November 2004 (aged 18)	1.77 m	10	0	(Costa Rica) CCDR Liberia
2	RW	Ali Lara	10 June 2003 (aged 20)	1.86 m	10	43	(Costa Rica) CCDR La Cruz
3	LW	Sebastián Acuña	20 August 2003 (aged 19)	1.75 m	10	27	(Costa Rica) CCDR Cartago
4	RB	Erick Kendall Suárez	15 March 2006 (aged 17)	1.81 m	5	31	(Costa Rica) CCDR Heredia
5	LB	Elimelec Montero	2 July 2005 (aged 17)	1.75 m	5	8	(Costa Rica) CCDR Alajuela
6	CB	Saúl Vargas	16 December 2002 (aged 20)	1.88 m	10	46	(Costa Rica) CCDR Alajuela
8	LB	Óscar Saborío	16 August 2002 (aged 20)	1.73 m	10	24	(Costa Rica) CCDR Liberia
9	RB	Erick Andrey Suárez	8 May 2003 (aged 20)	1.83 m	10	58	(Costa Rica) CCDR Heredia
10	P	Kendall García	24 January 2003 (aged 20)	1.86 m	10	15	(Costa Rica) CCDR Pococí
11	LW	Drivan Cubero	18 September 2002 (aged 20)	1.75 m	10	21	(Costa Rica) CCDR Desamparados
14	P	José Solís	20 January 2006 (aged 17)	1.79 m	10	2	(Costa Rica) CCDR Liberia
15	RW	Joseph Montoya	22 January 2002 (aged 21)	1.84 m	10	19	(Costa Rica) CCDR Heredia
16	GK	Víctor Gómez	3 December 2002 (aged 20)	1.83 m	10	0	(Costa Rica) CCDR Liberia
17	LB	Alex Trujillo	17 January 2005 (aged 18)	1.80 m	10	40	(Costa Rica) CCDR Liberia
19	P	Jerson Cantarero	24 November 2003 (aged 19)	1.81 m	10	51	(Costa Rica) CCDR Desamparados

=== Kuwait ===
A 18-player squad was announced on 18 June 2023.

Head coach: Magdi Aboelmagd

No.	Pos.	Name	Date of birth (age)	Height	App.	Goals	Club
1	GK	Ahmad Al-Juwaieed	10 October 2002 (aged 20)	1.92 m	7	0	(Kuwait) Kazma SC
3	P	Abdullah Al-Motawaa	19 May 2002 (aged 21)	1.90 m	0	0	(Kuwait) Al-Qurain SC
4	LW	Fawaz Al-Mashari	28 April 2002 (aged 21)	1.82 m	13	24	(Kuwait) Kazma SC
8	CB	Hashem Said	22 June 2002 (aged 20)	1.86 m	6	14	(Kuwait) Al-Qurain SC
10	CB	Hassan Abdulhadi	12 January 2003 (aged 20)	1.80 m	6	9	(Kuwait) Al-Qurain SC
13	LB	Hussain Hassan	15 January 2004 (aged 19)	1.86 m	5	12	(Kuwait) Al-Qurain SC
17	LB	Mahdi Al-Haddad	20 August 2002 (aged 20)	1.92 m	9	12	(Kuwait) Al-Arabi SC
18	P	Yaqoub Yaqoub	11 July 2004 (aged 18)	1.85 m	5	8	(Kuwait) Al-Yarmouk SC
20	RB	Abdullah Abdulrahman	19 January 2005 (aged 18)	1.75 m	0	0	(Kuwait) Al-Qurain SC
22	LW	Buland Ali	30 January 2002 (aged 21)	1.78 m	0	0	(Kuwait) Al-Salmiya SC
23	CB	Saif Al-Dawani	17 April 2002 (aged 21)	1.89 m	14	43	Al-Kuwait SC
30	LW	Abdullah Maarafi	26 January 2002 (aged 21)	1.79 m	7	14	(Kuwait) Al-Arabi SC
34	GK	Hamad Al-Dashti	29 June 2002 (aged 20)	1.92 m	7	0	(Kuwait) Kazma SC
44	P	Abdulrahman Al-Enezi	21 July 2002 (aged 20)	1.90 m	7	5	(Kuwait) Kazma SC
55	RB	Salman Al-Sanad	8 May 2002 (aged 21)	1.89 m	4	8	Al-Kuwait SC
72	P	Abdulrahman Al-Shammari	16 September 2002 (aged 20)	1.92 m	7	18	(Kuwait) Burgan SC
77	RW	Faraj Al-Salem	30 July 2002 (aged 20)	1.80 m	9	10	(Kuwait) Al-Qurain SC
79	RB	Jaafar Ali	7 December 2002 (aged 20)	1.79 m	7	15	(Kuwait) Al-Arabi SC

=== Portugal ===
A 16-player squad was announced on 12 June 2023.

Head coach: Carlos Martingo

No.	Pos.	Name	Date of birth (age)	Height	App.	Goals	Club
3	CB	André Sousa	3 March 2002 (aged 21)	1.86 m	67	311	(Portugal) FC Porto
6	LW	Gabriel Viana	26 July 2002 (aged 20)	1.90 m	35	58	(Germany) TuS Ferndorf
8	CB	Miguel Oliveira	13 January 2004 (aged 19)	1.98 m	46	86	(Portugal) FC Gaia
11	P	Nuno Queirós	21 April 2003 (aged 20)	1.91 m	20	28	(Portugal) Associação Atlética de Águas Santas
13	LB	Rodrigo Campos	6 October 2002 (aged 20)	1.94 m	3	0	(Portugal) FC Porto
14	RW	Bernardo Pêgas	17 September 2003 (aged 19)	1.87 m	39	79	(Portugal) FC Gaia
16	GK	Diogo Marques	17 March 2004 (aged 19)	1.89 m	53	5	(Portugal) FC Gaia
17	LW	Pedro Oliveira	4 July 2002 (aged 20)	1.81 m	37	101	(Portugal) FC Gaia
18	LB	Vasco Costa	2 December 2005 (aged 17)	1.96 m	38	126	(Portugal) FC Gaia
21	RB	Guilherme Tavares	27 March 2002 (aged 21)	1.94 m	24	32	(Portugal) Académico Marítimo Madeira Andebol SAD
23	RB	João Gomes	6 September 2002 (aged 20)	1.78 m	37	92	(Portugal) Associação Atlética de Águas Santas
24	P	Lucas Ribeiro	22 January 2002 (aged 21)	1.95 m	3	1	(Portugal) Nazaré Dom Fuas Andebol Clube
33	LB	Nilton Melo	22 September 2003 (aged 19)	1.97 m	42	13	(Portugal) Vitória FC
73	RW	Tiago Teixeira	10 June 2002 (aged 21)	1.80 m	11	23	(Portugal) Póvoa Andebol Clube
86	P	Ricardo Brandão	28 April 2004 (aged 19)	1.98 m	49	96	(Portugal) FC Gaia
90	GK	Tiago Ferreira	19 June 2002 (aged 21)	1.92 m	10	1	(Portugal) ABC/UMinho

== Group D ==
=== Angola ===
A 16-player squad was announced on 4 June 2023.

Head coach: Wiliam de Almeida

No.	Pos.	Name	Date of birth (age)	Height	App.	Goals	Club
1	GK	Virgílio Salvador	22 November 2003 (aged 19)	1.83 m	5	0	(Angola) GD Interclube
2	CB	Sérgio Constantino	9 February 2002 (aged 21)	1.82 m	5	8	(Angola) CD Primeiro de Agosto
5	RW	Paulo Domingos	7 February 2002 (aged 21)	1.72 m	0	0	(Angola) GD da Banca
7	LW	Cristóvão Lisboa	13 March 2003 (aged 20)	1.65 m	0	0	(Angola) GD Renascimento
8	P	José Chicola	1 March 2002 (aged 21)	1.85 m	5	24	(Angola) GD Interclube
9	LB	Nelson Pedro	24 June 2002 (aged 20)	1.74 m	0	0	(Angola) GD Interclube
10	CB	Gabriel Sebastião	4 July 2003 (aged 19)	1.83 m	0	0	(Angola) GD Interclube
11	LW	Rúben José	1 July 2002 (aged 20)	1.84 m	4	23	(Angola) GD Interclube
13	P	David Yambi	17 January 2002 (aged 21)	1.84 m	0	0	(Angola) CD Primeiro de Agosto
16	GK	Paulo Gonga	19 June 2002 (aged 21)	1.87 m	0	0	(Angola) GD Interclube
19	RW	Estevão Gomes	10 February 2002 (aged 21)	1.81 m	5	8	(Angola) GD Interclube
22	RW	Euclides João	25 March 2003 (aged 20)	1.95 m	5	5	(Angola) GD Interclube
29	LB	Elias Chiquete	29 December 2002 (aged 20)	1.86 m	0	0	(Angola) GD Interclube
30	RB	Pedro Domingos	21 August 2002 (aged 20)	1.82 m	5	22	(Angola) CD Primeiro de Agosto
35	CB	Reginaldo Domingos	24 December 2004 (aged 18)	1.75 m	0	0	(Angola) CD Primeiro de Agosto
99	LB	Mateus Pedro	27 June 2003 (aged 19)	1.82 m	0	0	(Angola) Atlético Petróleos de Luanda

=== Faroe Islands ===
A 16-player squad was announced on 6 June 2023.

Head coach: Julian Johansen

No.	Pos.	Name	Date of birth (age)	Height	App.	Goals	Club
1	GK	Pauli Jacobsen	11 July 2002 (aged 20)	1.90 m	18	0	(Faroe Islands) H71
4	LB	Bjarni í Selvindi	27 August 2002 (aged 20)	1.90 m	9	10	(Faroe Islands) Stranda Ítróttarfelag
8	RW	Bogi Hansen	23 May 2002 (aged 21)	1.85 m	18	19	(Faroe Islands) H71
17	P	Kristian Jensen	25 September 2003 (aged 19)	1.85 m	0	0	(Faroe Islands) Vestmanna IF
21	LW	Pauli Høj	22 May 2002 (aged 21)	1.85 m	4	4	(Faroe Islands) Neistin
22	GK	Aleksandar Lacok	15 February 2004 (aged 19)	1.95 m	14	0	(Faroe Islands) Neistin
23	LB	Ovi Lützen	26 February 2002 (aged 21)	1.90 m	14	3	(Faroe Islands) Neistin
47	P	Ísak Vedelsbøl	18 October 2004 (aged 18)	1.95 m	7	22	(Faroe Islands) Neistin
54	CB	Kristoffur Bjørgvin	30 April 2002 (aged 21)	1.85 m	13	8	(Faroe Islands) Vestmanna IF
61	LB	Pauli Mittún	30 May 2002 (aged 21)	1.90 m	18	63	(Denmark) Team Sydhavsøerne
63	CB	Brian Slyne	7 January 2003 (aged 20)	1.85 m	7	4	(Faroe Islands) Kollafjarðar Ítróttarfelag
71	CB	Elias Ellefsen á Skipagøtu	19 May 2002 (aged 21)	1.90 m	17	142	(Sweden) IK Sävehof
73	LW	Janus Djurhuus	21 August 2002 (aged 20)	1.85 m	18	51	(Iceland) Íþróttabandalag Vestmannaeyja
75	CB	Rói Ellefsen á Skipagøtu	10 October 2003 (aged 19)	1.90 m	18	38	(Faroe Islands) H71
80	LB	Sveinur Olafsson	31 March 2002 (aged 21)	1.90 m	18	23	(Faroe Islands) H71
88	RW	Hákun West av Teigum	19 February 2002 (aged 21)	1.90 m	18	81	(Denmark) Skanderborg Aarhus

=== Japan ===
A 18-player squad was announced on 10 June 2023.

Head coach: Shinnosuke Uematsu

No.	Pos.	Name	Date of birth (age)	Height	App.	Goals	Club
1	GK	Hiroto Imai	9 January 2002 (aged 21)	1.88 m	5	0	(Japan) Osaka University of Health and Sport Sciences
2	RB	Tetta Otake	22 April 2002 (aged 21)	1.80 m	5	20	(Japan) Nippon Sport Science University
3	LB	Futa Takahashi	16 May 2002 (aged 21)	1.83 m	5	5	(Japan) Nippon Sport Science University
4	CB	Naoki Fujisaka	1 July 2002 (aged 20)	1.80 m	5	32	(Japan) Nippon Sport Science University
5	LB	Shin Izumoto	5 September 2002 (aged 20)	1.85 m	5	22	(Japan) Chuo University
7	RW	Ren Arase	6 November 2002 (aged 20)	1.73 m	5	27	(Japan) Osaka University of Health and Sport Sciences
8	P	Seiichiro Habuchi	17 March 2003 (aged 20)	1.82 m	5	2	(Japan) Kansai University
9	RB	Kazuma Oura	20 July 2002 (aged 20)	1.87 m	5	12	(Japan) University of Tsukuba
10	CB	Ryoya Nakajima	18 September 2002 (aged 20)	1.75 m	4	17	(Japan) Chubu University
12	GK	Shogo Oyama	30 December 2002 (aged 20)	1.82 m	4	0	(Japan) University of Tsukuba
13	P	Keisuke Hosoda	31 March 2003 (aged 20)	1.82 m	5	6	(Japan) Fukuoka University
15	CB	Yusei Kitagawa	29 July 2002 (aged 20)	1.89 m	5	5	(Japan) Meiji University
16	GK	Kosuke Matsushita	9 September 2003 (aged 19)	1.82 m	2	0	(Japan) Kokushikan University
17	RB	Donovan Kondo	28 October 2003 (aged 19)	1.82 m	2	3	(Japan) Chuo University
20	CB	Shunsuke Arai	21 May 2002 (aged 21)	1.76 m	5	9	(Japan) Juntendo University
21	RW	Akaru Inoue	6 December 2002 (aged 20)	1.76 m	5	4	(Japan) Meisei University
26	LB	Yukito Tachibana	20 September 2002 (aged 20)	1.83 m	0	0	Toyota Motor East Japan
27	CB	Atsuki Matsubara	29 October 2002 (aged 20)	1.81 m	0	0	(Japan) Kokushikan University

=== Spain ===
A 16-player squad was announced on 20 June 2023.

Head coach: Rodrigo Reñones

No.	Pos.	Name	Date of birth (age)	Height	App.	Goals	Club
2	RB	Aleksander Cenic	11 January 2003 (aged 20)	1.90 m	0	0	(Spain) FC Barcelona
4	P	Javier Rodríguez	22 July 2002 (aged 20)	1.98 m	19	46	(Spain) CB Ciudad de Logroño
5	LB	Julen Urruzola	5 March 2002 (aged 21)	2.05 m	21	2	(Spain) CD Bidasoa
6	LB	Jan Gurri	10 June 2002 (aged 21)	1.94 m	16	80	(Spain) BM Granollers
8	LW	Martí Soler	28 April 2003 (aged 20)	1.97 m	19	52	(Spain) FC Barcelona
9	RB	Julen Múgica	3 September 2003 (aged 19)	1.91 m	21	32	(Spain) CD Bidasoa
10	LB	Eneko Furundarena	30 April 2003 (aged 20)	1.95 m	21	11	(Spain) CD Bidasoa
11	CB	Gorka Nieto	31 January 2002 (aged 21)	1.84 m	21	40	(Spain) CD Bidasoa
12	GK	Roberto Domenech	23 June 2002 (aged 20)	1.86 m	19	5	(Spain) FC Barcelona
14	CB	Bruno Reguart	25 May 2003 (aged 20)	1.88 m	21	59	(Spain) BM Granollers
15	P	Artur Parera	28 August 2002 (aged 20)	1.93 m	19	37	(Spain) FC Barcelona
16	GK	Daniel Martínez	19 May 2002 (aged 21)	1.88 m	13	3	(Spain) BM Puerto Sagunto
17	CB	Juan Sempere	21 June 2003 (aged 19)	1.83 m	5	4	(Spain) BM Benidorm
18	RW	Carlos Álvarez	6 February 2003 (aged 20)	1.82 m	18	66	(Spain) Club Cisne de Balonmano
19	LW	Arnau Fernández	21 May 2002 (aged 21)	1.75 m	18	48	(Spain) BM Ciudad Encantada
25	RW	Eduardo Ortiz	12 December 2002 (aged 20)	1.84 m	5	5	(Spain) CB Ciudad de Logroño

== Group E ==
=== Argentina ===
A 18-player squad was announced on 24 May 2023.

Head coach: Rodolfo Jung

No.	Pos.	Name	Date of birth (age)	Height	App.	Goals	Club
1	GK	Alan Perznianko	10 July 2002 (aged 20)	1.76 m	5	0	(Argentina) Argentinos Juniors
2	LB	Bruno Felipe	17 February 2002 (aged 21)	1.89 m	0	0	(Argentina) Ferro Carril Oeste
3	LB	Santiago Barceló	5 September 2002 (aged 20)	1.90 m	6	6	(Spain) BM Benidorm
4	CB	Francisco Cuello	26 July 2004 (aged 18)	1.94 m	5	19	(Argentina) Club Vilo
5	RB	Tobias Torossian	9 May 2002 (aged 21)	1.86 m	20	50	(Spain) Córdoba BM
6	CB	Juan Ceccardi	27 October 2002 (aged 20)	1.85 m	5	0	(Argentina) Ferro Carril Oeste
7	LW	Tomas Garay	16 July 2002 (aged 20)	1.85 m	5	17	(Argentina) Colegio Ward
8	RW	Juan Saco	28 January 2002 (aged 21)	1.90 m	0	0	(Spain) BM Proin
9	CB	Martín Jung	3 September 2002 (aged 20)	1.86 m	38	70	(Spain) BM Puente Genil
10	LW	Ramiro Benacedo	21 March 2002 (aged 21)	1.81 m	0	0	(Brazil) Handebol Clube Taubaté
11	LB	Juan Gull	19 May 2004 (aged 19)	2.06 m	20	64	(Brazil) Esporte Clube Pinheiros
12	GK	Gonzalo Guerra	31 January 2002 (aged 21)	1.94 m	2	1	(Brazil) Esporte Clube Pinheiros
15	RW	Lautaro Robledo	24 August 2002 (aged 20)	1.77 m	19	113	(Brazil) Esporte Clube Pinheiros
17	RW	Mateo Giménez	27 July 2003 (aged 19)	1.89 m	0	0	(Argentina) Argentinos Juniors
23	P	Juan Nobile	6 September 2002 (aged 20)	1.99 m	0	0	(Argentina) Asociación Alemana de Quilmes
25	P	Ezequiel Kelm	2 August 2002 (aged 20)	1.88 m	0	0	(Portugal) Sporting Clube da Horta
29	CB	Gonzalo Asensio	2 August 2002 (aged 20)	1.82 m	5	7	(Argentina) Dorrego Handball
42	P	Bruno Della Ratta	13 September 2002 (aged 20)	1.87 m	4	7	(Spain) CB Santoña

=== Denmark ===
A 16-player squad was announced on 24 May 2023.

Head coach: Arnór Atlason

No.	Pos.	Name	Date of birth (age)	Height	App.	Goals	Club
1	GK	Mikkel Løvkvist	31 July 2002 (aged 20)	2.03 m	37	0	(Denmark) Bjerringbro-Silkeborg Håndbold
2	LW	Joachim Als	7 April 2003 (aged 20)	1.99 m	34	90	(Denmark) GOG Håndbold
3	P	Frederik Sommer Arnoldsen	11 January 2002 (aged 21)	2.00 m	30	35	(Denmark) Skanderborg Aarhus Håndbold
4	RB	Hjalte Lykke	5 October 2004 (aged 18)	1.69 m	18	86	(Denmark) GOG Håndbold
5	LB	Victor Kløve	27 June 2002 (aged 20)	1.96 m	35	71	(Denmark) Aalborg Håndbold
7	RW	Patrick Boldsen	9 April 2003 (aged 20)	1.87 m	21	80	(Denmark) Bjerringbro-Silkeborg Håndbold
8	LB	Lucas Garsdal	27 February 2002 (aged 21)	1.92 m	15	53	(Denmark) HØJ Elite
9	CB	Christoffer Dreyer	16 March 2002 (aged 21)	1.95 m	21	14	(Denmark) GOG Håndbold
10	CB	Mads Knudsen	25 March 2002 (aged 21)	1.84 m	16	24	(Denmark) Mors-Thy Håndbold
12	GK	Matthias Dorgelo	31 October 2002 (aged 20)	1.99 m	36	2	(Denmark) GOG Håndbold
19	LB	Marinus Munk	22 April 2003 (aged 20)	1.98 m	10	15	(Denmark) Aalborg Håndbold
22	LW	Magnus Norlyk	24 October 2003 (aged 19)	1.83 m	7	18	(Denmark) Mors-Thy Håndbold
23	P	Julius Mørch-Rasmussen	14 May 2002 (aged 21)	2.04 m	38	42	(Denmark) Nordsjælland Håndbold
26	RB	Christian Termansen	17 June 2003 (aged 20)	1.95 m	16	32	(Denmark) Aalborg Håndbold
29	RW	Viktor Nevers	18 April 2002 (aged 21)	1.89 m	40	92	(Denmark) KIF Kolding
42	CB	Thomas Sommer Arnoldsen	11 January 2002 (aged 21)	1.94 m	32	190	(Denmark) Skanderborg Aarhus Håndbold

=== Hungary ===
A 18-player squad was announced on 7 June 2023.

Head coach: László Sótonyi

No.	Pos.	Name	Date of birth (age)	Height	App.	Goals	Club
1	GK	Kristóf Palasics	19 April 2002 (aged 21)	1.99 m	1	0	(Hungary) Nemzeti Kézilabda Akadémia
5	RB	Gábor Temesvári	29 March 2002 (aged 21)	2.10 m	0	0	(Hungary) Nemzeti Kézilabda Akadémia
7	RB	Zoran Ilić	2 January 2002 (aged 21)	1.97 m	12	12	(Hungary) Veszprém KC
8	LB	Andrej Pergel	18 June 2003 (aged 20)	1.97 m	0	0	(Hungary) Veszprém KC
9	CB	Dániel Sztraka	24 November 2003 (aged 19)	1.82 m	0	0	(Hungary) PLER KC
10	RW	Zsolt Krakovszki	9 July 2002 (aged 20)	1.88 m	0	0	(Hungary) Nemzeti Kézilabda Akadémia
11	P	Tamás Papp	11 November 2002 (aged 20)	1.84 m	0	0	(Hungary) Nemzeti Kézilabda Akadémia
13	LW	Erhárd Sisa	29 January 2002 (aged 21)	1.83 m	0	0	(Hungary) Nemzeti Kézilabda Akadémia
14	P	Miklós Karai	22 September 2002 (aged 20)	1.95 m	0	0	(Hungary) Kecskeméti TE
17	RB	Màtè Ònodi-Jànoskùti	17 June 2002 (aged 21)	1.93 m	0	0	(Hungary) FTC Kézilabdasport Nonprofit Kft
18	LW	Bence Krakovszki	9 July 2002 (aged 20)	1.87 m	0	0	(Hungary) Nemzeti Kézilabda Akadémia
19	RW	Bence Imre	15 October 2002 (aged 20)	1.87 m	0	0	(Hungary) FTC Kézilabdasport Nonprofit Kft
24	CB	Gergő Fazekas	31 October 2003 (aged 19)	1.95 m	0	0	(Poland) Wisła Płock
27	CB	Péter Lukács	30 July 2002 (aged 20)	1.92 m	0	0	(Hungary) Veszprém KC
29	LB	Marcell Ludmán	29 November 2002 (aged 20)	2.01 m	0	0	(Hungary) SC Pick Szeged
36	LW	Márkó Tárnoki	10 July 2003 (aged 19)	1.93 m	0	0	(Hungary) Nemzeti Kézilabda Akadémia
61	GK	Krisztián Mikler	5 December 2002 (aged 20)	1.93 m	0	0	(Hungary) BFKA Veszprém
90	GK	Ákos Takács	6 January 2002 (aged 21)	1.99 m	0	0	(Hungary) Nemzeti Kézilabda Akadémia

=== Norway ===
A 16-player squad was announced on 26 May 2023.

Head coach: Žarko Pejović

No.	Pos.	Name	Date of birth (age)	Height	App.	Goals	Club
1	GK	Sivert Jonson Tryggestad	20 October 2003 (aged 19)	2.01 m	27	1	(Norway) Follo HK
3	RW	Erlend Johnsen	13 February 2003 (aged 20)	1.82 m	29	36	(Norway) Sandefjord Håndball
5	LW	Preben Gram	4 September 2004 (aged 18)	1.82 m	7	18	(Norway) IL Runar
10	LB	Aleksander Høiness	1 August 2002 (aged 20)	1.96 m	30	51	(Norway) Haslum HK
12	GK	Henrik Ibsen	16 March 2004 (aged 19)	1.84 m	18	0	(Norway) Charlottenlund SK
13	LB	Sverre Ottesen	16 June 2003 (aged 20)	1.92 m	4	11	(Norway) Haslum HK
14	P	Lars Eirik Larsen	17 March 2004 (aged 19)	1.91 m	23	96	(Norway) Nærbø IL
18	RB	Benjamin Berg	16 March 2003 (aged 20)	1.99 m	28	91	(Norway) Elverum Håndball
24	CB	Tord Lea Knutsen	17 January 2002 (aged 21)	1.83 m	40	11	(Norway) Sandnes HK
25	RW	Ebbe Stankiewicz	8 April 2002 (aged 21)	1.82 m	37	103	(Sweden) Ystads IF
26	P	Jakub Petržela	19 September 2003 (aged 19)	1.99 m	4	4	(Norway) Sandefjord Håndball
29	LB	Thomas Stenersen	29 June 2003 (aged 19)	2.00 m	26	14	(Norway) Halden IL
30	RB	Sondre Mikal Solheim	2 April 2002 (aged 21)	1.93 m	24	44	(Norway) Bækkelagets SK
32	LW	Even Haugli	15 December 2004 (aged 18)	1.93 m	19	55	(Norway) Haslum IL
33	CB	Linus Högdahl	2 January 2002 (aged 21)	1.93 m	16	21	(Norway) Charlottenlund SK
34	GK	Hans Gran	24 May 2002 (aged 21)	1.98 m	16	0	(Norway) Bækkelagets SK

== Group F ==
=== Bahrain ===
A 18-player squad was announced on 9 June 2023.

Head coach: Abdulla Esam

No.	Pos.	Name	Date of birth (age)	Height	App.	Goals	Club
7	RW	Mahmood Al-Khunaizi	12 December 2002 (aged 20)	1.71 m	6	3	(Bahrain) Al-Ittihad
8	RW	Hasan Ali	7 October 2003 (aged 19)	1.74 m	6	3	(Bahrain) Al-Ahli
10	LB	Mohamed Rabia	14 January 2003 (aged 20)	1.83 m	20	25	(Bahrain) Al-Ittifaq
11	LB	Ahmed Kadhem	9 May 2003 (aged 20)	1.93 m	5	6	(Bahrain) Al-Shabab
12	GK	Sadeq Al-Raqraq	4 August 2002 (aged 20)	1.79 m	0	0	(Bahrain) Tobli
14	LB	Abdulla Ali	25 January 2002 (aged 21)	1.82 m	6	3	(Bahrain) Al-Najma
16	GK	Ali Naser	29 March 2003 (aged 20)	1.67 m	0	0	(Bahrain) Al-Ittifaq
19	LW	Ali Al-Asheeri	13 April 2002 (aged 21)	1.82 m	15	30	(Bahrain) Al-Dair
20	GK	Hesham Isa	5 January 2003 (aged 20)	1.65 m	21	2	(Bahrain) Al-Dair
23	LW	Ahmed Al-Zain	6 June 2003 (aged 20)	1.77 m	0	0	(Bahrain) Al-Ahli
26	RW	Mustafa Al-Hayki	8 February 2002 (aged 21)	1.87 m	5	3	(Bahrain) Al-Ahli
50	LB	Yaser Qambar	30 January 2003 (aged 20)	1.75 m	0	0	(Bahrain) Barbar
64	P	Ali Mohamed	22 April 2002 (aged 21)	1.75 m	18	20	(Bahrain) Al-Ittifaq
69	RW	Komail Ali	12 March 2002 (aged 21)	1.85 m	6	4	(Bahrain) Al-Najma
73	CB	Husain Saleh	17 January 2003 (aged 20)	1.82 m	6	3	(Bahrain) Tobli
77	RB	Jasim Khamis	2 September 2002 (aged 20)	1.77 m	10	4	(Bahrain) Al-Shabab
90	RB	Ali Abdulla	5 August 2002 (aged 20)	1.85 m	5	3	(Bahrain) Al-Tadamon
99	CB	Ali Madan	29 June 2003 (aged 19)	1.72 m	0	0	(Bahrain) Barbar

=== Greenland ===
Head coach: Angutimmarik Kreutzmann

No.	Pos.	Name	Date of birth (age)	Height	App.	Goals	Club
1	GK	Bjarne Andersen	11 June 2002 (aged 21)	1.86 m	4	0	(Greenland) NÛK Håndbold
2	RW	Sebastian Jensen	9 June 2006 (aged 17)	1.74 m	4	5	(Greenland) NÛK Håndbold
3	LW	Aqqalu-Nuka Jakobsen	15 November 2004 (aged 18)	1.83 m	4	13	(Greenland) NÛK Håndbold
5	P	Kusigaq Nielsen	12 July 2005 (aged 17)	1.88 m	4	6	(Denmark) Galtrup FS
6	RB	Archibald Lennert	2 August 2004 (aged 18)	1.82 m	4	18	(Greenland) Grønlands Seminariums Sportklub
7	CB	Kâle Haastrup	17 July 2003 (aged 19)	1.81 m	4	13	(Greenland) Grønlands Seminariums Sportklub
8	LW	Maligiaq Rosing	18 September 2003 (aged 19)	1.83 m	4	16	(Greenland) Grønlands Seminariums Sportklub
9	LB	Nicklas Andersen	5 December 2003 (aged 19)	1.93 m	4	1	(Greenland) NÛK Håndbold
11	LB	Malik Rosing	14 March 2003 (aged 20)	1.82 m	0	0	(Greenland) NÛK Håndbold
12	GK	Henrik Hansen	8 May 2004 (aged 19)	1.87 m	4	1	(Greenland) Grønlands Seminariums Sportklub
15	LW	Mikki Lynge	12 June 2003 (aged 20)	1.78 m	0	0	(Greenland) Grønlands Seminariums Sportklub
16	GK	Salik Geisler	12 February 2007 (aged 16)	1.88 m	0	0	(Greenland) NÛK Håndbold
17	CB	Steen Møller	31 December 2003 (aged 19)	1.83 m	4	14	(Greenland) Grønlands Seminariums Sportklub
21	LB	Pavia Lynge	12 March 2003 (aged 20)	1.81 m	0	0	(Greenland) Grønlands Seminariums Sportklub
24	RB	Kim Nielsen	24 October 2006 (aged 16)	1.81 m	4	4	(Denmark) Oure I.E. HK
27	CB	Carl-Christian Johansen	19 February 2006 (aged 17)	1.80 m	0	0	(Denmark) Håndbold Akademi Ikast

=== Slovenia ===
A 16-player squad was announced on 17 June 2023.

Head coach: Saša Praprotnik

No.	Pos.	Name	Date of birth (age)	Height	App.	Goals	Club
3	P	Denis Škrinjar	21 November 2002 (aged 20)	1.91 m	19	13	(Slovenia) RK Jeruzalem Ormož
4	LB	Tarik Mlivić	21 April 2003 (aged 20)	1.95 m	19	27	(Slovenia) RK Gorenje Velenje
6	RB	Tarik Velić	8 January 2003 (aged 20)	1.98 m	0	0	(Slovenia) RK Gorenje Velenje
8	CB	Mitja Janc	5 April 2003 (aged 20)	1.83 m	19	122	(Slovenia) RK Celje
9	CB	Jure Lukman	18 December 2002 (aged 20)	1.81 m	7	18	(Slovenia) RK Jeruzalem Ormož
10	CB	Nik Ćirović	23 March 2002 (aged 21)	1.87 m	19	82	(Slovenia) RK Celje
12	GK	Luka Zupančič	4 August 2003 (aged 19)	1.91 m	14	0	(Slovenia) RK Celje
13	LB	Jaka Soršak	15 September 2003 (aged 19)	1.93 m	8	3	(Slovenia) RD Slovan
14	LW	Aljaž Levstek	6 December 2002 (aged 20)	1.90 m	0	0	(Slovenia) RD Ribnica
16	GK	Žan Rauh	14 November 2003 (aged 19)	1.88 m	7	0	(Slovenia) MRK Krka
18	RW	Juš Rot	14 November 2003 (aged 19)	1.88 m	14	21	(Slovenia) ŠRD Škofljica
19	LW	Vid Kačičnik	29 March 2002 (aged 21)	1.83 m	14	16	(Slovenia) RK Celje
20	RW	Anej Majcen	12 December 2003 (aged 19)	1.83 m	0	0	(Slovenia) RK Prevent Slovenj Gradec
21	P	Leon Gregorič	21 March 2003 (aged 20)	1.89 m	19	43	(Slovenia) RK Celje
22	P	Ožbej Šilc	12 December 2002 (aged 20)	1.92 m	0	0	(Slovenia) RD Loka
23	LB	Vid Miklavec	19 May 2002 (aged 21)	1.95 m	19	40	(Slovenia) RK Trimo Trebnje

=== Sweden ===
A 17-player squad was announced on 15 May 2023.

Head coach: Dennis Sandberg

No.	Pos.	Name	Date of birth (age)	Height	App.	Goals	Club
4	RW	Carl Hamberg	20 May 2002 (aged 21)	1.87 m	10	30	(Sweden) Redbergslids IK
5	RW	Tobias Ljungmark	9 July 2003 (aged 19)	1.93 m	10	22	(Sweden) HK Aranäs
6	LB	Petter Donaldson	5 March 2003 (aged 20)	1.93 m	10	2	(Sweden) HK Aranäs
7	CB	Adam Ljungquist	23 December 2002 (aged 20)	1.86 m	10	22	(Sweden) IFK Skövde
9	RB	Kasper Palmar	27 October 2003 (aged 19)	1.96 m	9	42	(Sweden) Ystads IF
10	P	Felix Möller	4 September 2002 (aged 20)	1.97 m	31	107	(Sweden) IK Sävehof
11	P	Johan Ericsson	31 May 2002 (aged 21)	2.00 m	10	16	(Sweden) HK Aranäs
12	GK	Marko Roganović	28 October 2002 (aged 20)	1.97 m	10	1	(Sweden) Eskilstuna Guif
16	GK	Alexander Lindén	29 July 2003 (aged 19)	1.95 m	23	1	(Sweden) HK Aranäs
17	LW	Kelvin Roberts	17 January 2003 (aged 20)	1.92 m	10	18	(Sweden) IK Sävehof
18	P	Axel Skoog	25 May 2002 (aged 21)	2.00 m	11	20	(Sweden) HK Varberg
20	CB	Isak Larsson	7 January 2003 (aged 20)	1.84 m	12	38	(Sweden) IFK Kristianstad
21	GK	Oscar Sävinger	13 June 2002 (aged 21)	1.97 m	31	0	(Sweden) IK Sävehof
22	RB	Marcus Lennernäs	24 April 2002 (aged 21)	1.95 m	12	31	(Sweden) IK Sävehof
23	LB	William Elovson	4 August 2002 (aged 20)	1.95 m	10	29	(Sweden) IFK Skövde
30	CB	Robin Sanderhem	22 January 2002 (aged 21)	1.85 m	9	32	(Sweden) Hammarby IF
33	LW	Albin Leyman	2 April 2003 (aged 20)	1.80 m	0	0	(Sweden) IFK Kristianstad

== Group G ==
=== Chile ===
A 16-player squad was announced on 12 June 2023.

Head coach: Aitor Etxaburu

No.	Pos.	Name	Date of birth (age)	Height	App.	Goals	Club
3	CB	Sebastián Puelma	15 April 2002 (aged 21)	1.82 m	0	0	(Chile) DPV Kutral
11	LB	Alberto Orellana	16 April 2002 (aged 21)	1.87 m	0	0	(Chile) DPV Kutral
12	P	Benjamín Barrios	10 September 2003 (aged 19)	1.91 m	0	0	(Chile) USAB
17	GK	Esteban Menanteau	18 August 2003 (aged 19)	1.80 m	0	0	(Chile) Club Balonmano Cordillera
18	LB	Daniel Montecino	11 January 2002 (aged 21)	1.91 m	0	0	Club Deportivo Ferroviarios de Chile
19	P	Jonas Jn Charles	19 April 2004 (aged 19)	1.85 m	0	0	(Chile) DPV Kutral
21	LW	Joaquín Olguín	16 September 2002 (aged 20)	1.81 m	0	0	(Chile) Unión Machali Balonmano
23	P	Gonzalo Bustamante	13 September 2002 (aged 20)	1.83 m	0	0	(Chile) Unión Machali Balonmano
24	RW	Jovani Pino	5 May 2002 (aged 21)	1.76 m	0	0	(Chile) DPV Kutral
26	RW	Camilo Ceballos	17 April 2002 (aged 21)	1.84 m	0	0	(Chile) DPV Kutral
27	LW	Renato Castro	9 June 2003 (aged 20)	1.73 m	0	0	(Chile) Liceo Nacional de Maipú
28	RW	Luciano Scaramelli	23 April 2002 (aged 21)	1.82 m	0	0	(Chile) Pallamano Trieste
33	CB	Rodolfo Huaracán	29 April 2002 (aged 21)	1.68 m	0	0	(Chile) Liceo Nacional de Maipú
37	RW	Camilo Hernández	7 February 2004 (aged 19)	1.83 m	0	0	(Chile) Club Italiano Balonmano
48	CB	Cristóbal Oyarzún	30 June 2004 (aged 18)	1.92 m	0	0	(Chile) Ovalle Balonmano
76	GK	Alejandro Rosales	12 June 2003 (aged 20)	1.87 m	0	0	(Chile) Unión Machali Balonmano

=== Iceland ===
Head coach: Einar Andri Einarsson

No.	Pos.	Name	Date of birth (age)	Height	App.	Goals	Club
1	GK	Brynjar Vignir Sigurjónsson	18 June 2002 (aged 21)	1.98 m	39	4	(Iceland) Ungmennafélagið Afturelding
2	CB	Guðmundur Bragi Ástþórsson	17 July 2002 (aged 20)	1.89 m	39	128	(Iceland) Haukar
3	LB	Einar Bragi Aðalsteinsson	22 August 2002 (aged 20)	1.94 m	20	32	(Iceland) Fimleikafélag Hafnarfjarðar
4	LB	Andri Már Rúnarsson	21 August 2002 (aged 20)	1.87 m	40	146	(Iceland) Haukar
5	LB	Þorsteinn Leó Gunnarsson	13 November 2002 (aged 20)	2.08 m	15	33	(Iceland) Ungmennafélagið Afturelding
8	P	Tryggvi Þórisson	18 June 2002 (aged 21)	2.00 m	40	73	(Sweden) IK Sävehof
9	RB	Ísak Gústafsson	14 February 2003 (aged 20)	1.86 m	44	84	(Iceland) Selfoss
10	CB	Benedikt Gunnar Óskarsson	12 September 2002 (aged 20)	1.80 m	48	208	(Iceland) Valur
11	P	Andri Finnsson	26 November 2002 (aged 20)	1.90 m	23	43	(Iceland) Valur
12	GK	Jón Þórarinn Þorsteinsson	15 October 2003 (aged 19)	1.90 m	12	0	(Iceland) Selfoss
16	GK	Adam Thorstensen	25 August 2002 (aged 20)	2.00 m	28	1	(Iceland) Stjarnan
17	RW	Kristófer Máni Jónasson	8 May 2002 (aged 21)	1.82 m	46	119	(Iceland) Haukar
18	LW	Símon Mikael Guðjónsson	17 November 2002 (aged 20)	1.83 m	46	103	(Iceland) Handknattleiksfélag Kópavogs
19	RB	Jóhannes Berg Andrason	19 June 2003 (aged 20)	1.90 m	39	55	(Iceland) Fimleikafélag Hafnarfjarðar
20	LB	Arnór Viðarsson	13 March 2002 (aged 21)	1.91 m	47	123	(Iceland) Íþróttabandalag Vestmannaeyja
31	LB	Róbert Örvarsson	10 December 2003 (aged 19)	1.95 m	2	2	(Iceland) Íþróttafélag Reykjavíkur
32	RW	Stefán Orri Arnalds	16 March 2002 (aged 21)	1.78 m	2	2	(Iceland) Fram

=== Morocco ===
Head coach: Mohammed Berrajaâ

No.	Pos.	Name	Date of birth (age)	Height	App.	Goals	Club
2	CB	Ayoub Moustakim	17 August 2002 (aged 20)	1.78 m	0	0	(Morocco) Fath Union Sport
4	P	Mustapha Fathane	22 July 2002 (aged 20)	1.95 m	15	20	(Morocco) Widad Smara
5	CB	Marouane Boukhamsa	16 June 2002 (aged 21)	1.88 m	12	20	(Morocco) RCMA
7	RB	Abdelmoughite Sarghoune	8 November 2002 (aged 20)	1.85 m	0	0	(Morocco) Montada Derb Sultan
8	LW	Mohamed Kissar	3 February 2003 (aged 20)	1.86 m	12	15	(Morocco) Widad Smara
16	GK	Karbal El-Mehdi	1 January 2003 (aged 20)	1.91 m	0	0	(Morocco) Alliance Sports Casablanca
17	RW	LBachir Mansouri	18 March 2004 (aged 19)	1.82 m	0	0	(Morocco) CET Tétouan
19	LB	Abdellah Razgui	4 September 2004 (aged 18)	1.85 m	12	20	(Morocco) Widad Smara
20	CB	Hamza Fettah	22 February 2002 (aged 21)	1.86 m	0	0	(Morocco) Amal Souk Sebt
34	RW	Achraf El-Adich	6 January 2003 (aged 20)	1.85 m	12	20	(Morocco) RCMA
40	LW	Badr Lamrani Khalidi	30 September 2002 (aged 20)	1.67 m	0	0	(Morocco) AS FAR
55	CB	Aymen Ouafik	6 December 2002 (aged 20)	1.84 m	0	0	(Morocco) Montada Derb Sultan
71	LB	Abdelilah Labiad	23 January 2002 (aged 21)	1.86 m	0	0	(Morocco) AS FAR
77	P	Younes Ouzrour	19 March 2002 (aged 21)	1.92 m	5	0	(France) Pontault-Combault Handball
87	LB	Walid Bouha	20 February 2003 (aged 20)	1.94 m	0	0	(France) Montpellier Handball
94	P	Mohamed Reda Boukhouch	14 June 2003 (aged 20)	1.87 m	0	0	(Morocco) Widad Smara
96	GK	Youssef El-Mouaddar	13 April 2003 (aged 20)	1.80 m	27	0	(France) Élite Val d'Oise

=== Serbia ===
A 18-player squad was announced on 19 June 2023.

Head coach: Đorđe Teodorović

No.	Pos.	Name	Date of birth (age)	Height	App.	Goals	Club
1	GK	Marko Mrdović	21 June 2002 (aged 20)	1.92 m	14	0	(Serbia) ORK Šamot 65
3	RW	Milija Papović	24 February 2005 (aged 18)	1.88 m	7	22	(Serbia) RK Metaloplastika
4	LW	Uroš Simić	15 July 2002 (aged 20)	1.80 m	14	24	(Serbia) RK Crvena zvezda
5	LB	Miloš Kos	1 August 2002 (aged 20)	1.92 m	7	43	(Croatia) RK Zagreb
6	RB	Boško Stanisavljević	23 March 2002 (aged 21)	1.83 m	7	25	(Serbia) RK Radnički Kragujevac
8	LB	Vojin Čabrilo	24 August 2004 (aged 18)	1.96 m	7	8	(Serbia) RK Crvenka
14	CB	Vukašin Antonijević	10 March 2004 (aged 19)	1.89 m	13	41	(Slovenia) RK Celje
19	RW	Mateja Dodić	14 April 2003 (aged 20)	1.90 m	14	41	(Serbia) RK Metaloplastika
21	LW	Dušan Šmigić	2 May 2003 (aged 20)	1.89 m	7	14	(Serbia) RK Crvena zvezda
24	CB	Veljko Čabrilo	20 December 2002 (aged 20)	1.88 m	11	6	(Serbia) RK Dinamo
25	LB	Simo Šijan	31 August 2004 (aged 18)	1.87 m	7	37	(Serbia) RK Vojvodina
28	LB	Aljoša Damjanović	29 May 2005 (aged 18)	1.88 m	0	0	(Serbia) RK Metaloplastika
29	P	Igor Milovanović	9 June 2004 (aged 19)	1.91 m	7	8	(France) Paris Saint-Germain Handball
33	P	Luka Rogan	4 July 2003 (aged 19)	1.93 m	14	50	(Serbia) RK Vojvodina
34	LB	Nikola Zečević	10 March 2002 (aged 21)	1.99 m	7	41	(Serbia) RK Partizan
35	P	Branko Predović	28 August 2002 (aged 20)	1.92 m	14	24	(Slovenia) RK Gorenje Velenje
77	GK	Luka Krivokapić	7 February 2002 (aged 21)	1.97 m	6	1	(Hungary) SC Pick Szeged
91	GK	Savo Zekić	1 October 2003 (aged 19)	1.87 m	14	0	(Serbia) RK Vrbas

== Group H ==
=== Cuba ===
Head coach: Alexis Luis

No.	Pos.	Name	Date of birth (age)	Height	App.	Goals	Club
1	GK	Esnie Negret	28 January 2003 (aged 20)	1.90 m	15	0	Santiago de Cuba
3	P	Omar Hernández	3 August 2005 (aged 17)	1.84 m	5	1	(Cuba) Artemisa
5	LW	Lázaro Vega	31 January 2004 (aged 19)	1.70 m	10	16	(Cuba) La Habana
8	RB	Adrián Azcuy	7 April 2003 (aged 20)	1.85 m	0	0	(Cuba) Pinar del Río
10	CB	Geovanis Claro	11 September 2006 (aged 16)	1.87 m	0	0	(Cuba) Holguín
11	LB	Osmany Miniet	5 September 2006 (aged 16)	1.80 m	10	18	(Cuba) Artemisa
12	GK	Dairon Girón	12 May 2002 (aged 21)	2.01 m	25	0	(Cuba) Granma
13	LW	Andro Gonzalés	18 August 2002 (aged 20)	1.83 m	25	60	(Cuba) Holguín
14	RW	Maiko Vázques	3 September 2003 (aged 19)	1.93 m	25	92	(Cuba) Matanzas
19	CB	Samuel Cordies	2 November 2002 (aged 20)	1.90 m	30	95	(Cuba) Granma
20	GK	Luis Alazales	18 September 2006 (aged 16)	1.85 m	0	0	(Cuba) Artemisa
34	RB	Rolando Méndez	3 May 2002 (aged 21)	1.88 m	10	49	(Cuba) Camagüey
49	CB	Lisván Mora	2 December 2002 (aged 20)	1.81 m	15	12	(Cuba) Villa Clara
55	RW	Ronal Menéndez	1 March 2005 (aged 18)	1.85 m	10	2	(Cuba) Artemisa
66	P	Diosel Rondón	2 December 2002 (aged 20)	1.85 m	10	18	(Cuba) Granma

=== Egypt ===
A 17-player squad was announced on 14 June 2023.

Head coach: Mohamed El-Alfy

No.	Pos.	Name	Date of birth (age)	Height	App.	Goals	Club
1	GK	Youssef Fahim	16 May 2003 (aged 20)	1.92 m	25	4	(Egypt) Zamalek SC
4	P	Omar Hussein	14 February 2002 (aged 21)	1.88 m	25	30	(Egypt) Al Ahly
5	RW	Mohamed Khallaf	31 March 2004 (aged 19)	1.86 m	32	87	(Egypt) Tala'ea El Gaish SC
9	LW	Rady Ahmed	6 February 2002 (aged 21)	1.83 m	28	42	(Egypt) Al Ahly
13	LW	Adam El-Beshry	28 July 2003 (aged 19)	1.82 m	16	22	(France) US Créteil Handball
15	P	Mahmoud Shalby	22 April 2002 (aged 21)	1.97 m	16	10	(Egypt) Al Ahly
16	GK	Youssef Ahmed	1 April 2004 (aged 19)	1.87 m	20	4	(Egypt) Alexandria SC
21	P	Mohamed Abousalem	15 January 2002 (aged 21)	2.02 m	26	25	(Egypt) Zamalek SC
24	LB	Marawan Mohamed	20 January 2002 (aged 21)	1.90 m	22	30	(Egypt) Al Ahly
29	CB	Ahmed Abdelhamid	1 May 2002 (aged 21)	1.80 m	16	30	(Egypt) Heliolido SC
30	GK	Youssef Salama	15 May 2004 (aged 19)	1.93 m	20	1	(Egypt) El Shams SC
48	RB	Mohab Abdelhak	20 January 2003 (aged 20)	1.91 m	40	80	(Egypt) Al Ahly
55	RW	Mohamed Ibrahim	3 January 2002 (aged 21)	1.88 m	22	18	(Egypt) Alexandria SC
71	RW	Yassin Salem	18 September 2004 (aged 18)	1.83 m	14	11	(Egypt) Smouha SC
77	CB	Omar Mohamed	20 July 2002 (aged 20)	1.89 m	30	35	(Egypt) Zamalek SC
84	LB	Hisham Doieb	30 January 2002 (aged 21)	1.92 m	19	14	(Egypt) Zamalek SC
99	CB	Omar Salem	23 January 2003 (aged 20)	1.85 m	22	19	(Egypt) Aviation SC

=== Greece ===
Head coach: Nikolaos Georgiadis

No.	Pos.	Name	Date of birth (age)	Height	App.	Goals	Club
1	GK	Dimitrios Bampatzanidis	27 March 2002 (aged 21)	1.95 m	14	0	(Greece) Aesx Pylaias
2	RB	Alexandros Koukoulas	13 May 2003 (aged 20)	1.93 m	0	0	(Greece) Ionikos Nea Filadelfeia
6	CB	Dimitrios Panagiotou	21 May 2002 (aged 21)	1.81 m	14	33	(Greece) AC Doukas School
7	LW	Christos Papagiannis	2 July 2002 (aged 20)	1.82 m	14	12	(Greece) PAS Aeropos Edessas
10	P	Nikolaos Dikaioulias	2 August 2003 (aged 19)	1.90 m	9	32	(Greece) AC Doukas School
11	RB	Athanasios Papazoglou	28 January 2002 (aged 21)	1.92 m	14	49	(Greece) PAOK HC
13	CB	Konstantinos Kotsionis	26 October 2002 (aged 20)	1.90 m	12	58	(Greece) ESN Vrilissia
14	P	Konstantinos Kyriakidis	17 September 2002 (aged 20)	1.91 m	9	5	(Greece) Aesx Pylaias
15	RB	Achilleas Toskas	1 October 2004 (aged 18)	1.91 m	9	28	(Greece) Bianco Monte Drama 1986
16	GK	Georgios Daios	29 March 2004 (aged 19)	1.97 m	4	0	(Greece) HANTH
18	CB	Pantelis-Leonidas Alexandridis	9 February 2002 (aged 21)	1.87 m	14	19	(Greece) Aesx Pylaias
20	LB	Eleftherios Anastasiou	5 August 2002 (aged 20)	1.95 m	14	23	(Greece) AC Doukas School
21	RW	Ioannis Vasileiou Tsafos	23 October 2003 (aged 19)	1.95 m	4	2	(Greece) Ionikos Nea Filadelfeia
30	LW	Armando Sina	13 February 2002 (aged 21)	1.80 m	14	31	(Greece) Bianco Monte Drama 1986
34	CB	Andreas Geroulanos	2 January 2002 (aged 21)	1.90 m	14	14	(Greece) AC Doukas School
55	P	Eleftherios Pagiatis	13 June 2002 (aged 21)	1.86 m	14	35	(Greece) AC Doukas School
77	RW	Nikolaos Tzortzinis	25 February 2002 (aged 21)	1.96 m	14	46	(Greece) PAOK HC
99	RW	Ioannis Stefanitsis	15 October 2003 (aged 19)	1.71 m	14	35	(Greece) AC Doukas School

=== Saudi Arabia ===
A 18-player squad was announced on 6 June 2023.

Head coach: Juan López

No.	Pos.	Name	Date of birth (age)	Height	App.	Goals	Club
1	GK	Jehad Abualwah	7 March 2002 (aged 21)	1.85 m	15	1	(Saudi Arabia) Al-Noor Club
9	P	Mohammed Al-Ibrahim	5 August 2002 (aged 20)	1.94 m	6	14	(Saudi Arabia) Al-Salam Club
13	RB	Sajjad Al-Abdulrazzaq	13 October 2002 (aged 20)	1.80 m	8	32	(Saudi Arabia) Al-Taraji Club
14	GK	Jawad Al-Abbas	10 January 2004 (aged 19)	1.85 m	3	5	(Saudi Arabia) Khaleej Club
16	GK	Hussain Al-Safwani	21 May 2004 (aged 19)	1.70 m	11	9	(Saudi Arabia) Al-Noor Club
18	RB	Sajjad Al-Fardan	17 July 2004 (aged 18)	1.79 m	12	15	(Saudi Arabia) Mudhar Club
19	RW	Ayman Al-Ghzwi	28 March 2003 (aged 20)	1.83 m	3	7	(Saudi Arabia) Al-Taraji Club
25	CB	Ahmed Al-Obaidi	20 July 2007 (aged 15)	1.73 m	11	15	(Saudi Arabia) Al-Noor Club
28	CB	Hussain Al-Dawagh	1 July 2003 (aged 19)	1.83 m	5	10	(Saudi Arabia) Al-Taraji Club
34	P	Mahdi Al-Ahmed	12 October 2003 (aged 19)	1.78 m	0	0	(Saudi Arabia) Al-Ahli Club
39	RB	Ahmed Al-Saeed	28 October 2004 (aged 18)	1.85 m	15	20	(Saudi Arabia) Al-Noor Club
44	LB	Atiah Al-Harbi	30 June 2004 (aged 18)	1.85 m	14	17	(Saudi Arabia) Al Wehda Club
57	LW	Mahdi Al-Abass	11 February 2005 (aged 18)	1.83 m	4	3	(Saudi Arabia) Al-Houda Club
77	P	Maitham Abusarer	22 August 2004 (aged 18)	1.83 m	16	22	(Saudi Arabia) Khaleej Club
78	LB	Ahmed Al-Abdullah	27 August 2002 (aged 20)	1.88 m	16	19	(Saudi Arabia) Al-Qarra Club
90	CB	Qasem Al-Turki	4 February 2005 (aged 18)	1.78 m	16	33	(Saudi Arabia) Khaleej Club
94	LB	Murtaja Al-Khedhrawi	2 March 2002 (aged 21)	1.85 m	22	17	(Saudi Arabia) Al-Ebtissam
97	LB	Abdullah Al-Yousef	4 October 2002 (aged 20)	1.85 m	14	17	(Saudi Arabia) Al-Ebtissam
