= Robin Molnár =

Hungarian handball player (born 2004)

Personal information
- Nationality: Hungarian
- Born: 1 February 2004 (age 22) Győr, Hungary
- Height: 1.94 m (6 ft 4 in)

Sport
- Sport: Handball
- Position: Left wing
- Current club: MOL Tatabánya KC
- Number: 88

Youth career
- Years: Team
- 2014–2017: Győri FKKA
- 2017–2018: SZESE Győr
- 2018–2021: NEKA

Senior clubs
- Years: Team
- 2021–2023: → (Hungary) SC Pick Szeged (loan)
- 2023–2025: (Hungary) NEKA
- 2025–2026: (Hungary) ONE Veszprém
- 2026–: (Hungary) MOL Tatabánya KC
National team
Years	Team	Apps	(Gls)
2023–	Hungary	2	(2)

Robin Molnár (born 1 February 2004) is a Hungarian handball player who plays for MOL Tatabánya KC and the Hungarian national team.

== Career ==
=== Club ===
Robin started his career at Győri FKKA. In 2017, he transferred to SZESE Győr. Moved from Győr to Balatonboglár, the National Handball Academy (NEKA) in 2018. In 2021, he joined the SC Pick Szeged team on loan for 2 years. Here, in the 2021/2022 season, he played in the second team of SC Pick Szeged in the Nemzeti Bajnokság I/B. He made his debut in Nemzeti Bajnokság I in October 2022 in the first team of SC Pick Szeged. In November 2022, he could also make his debut in the EHF Champions League against RK Celje. At the end of the season, he won the silver medal with SC Pick Szeged in both the championship and the cup behind Telekom Veszprém. After two seasons spent on loan in Szeged, he is in NEKA's Nemzeti Bajnokság I team from the 2023/24 season. In the spring of 2024, NEKA won a bronze medal in the cup to a huge surprise. In the fall of 2024, it was announced that he would join the ONE Veszprém team for 2 years from the summer of 2025. After 1 season, he left ONE Veszprém and signed with MOL Tatabánya KC.

=== National team ===
He was 4th with the Hungarian team at the 2022 Youth European Championship. At the age of 19, on 27 April 2023, he made his debut in the senior national team in Klaipėda in the Lithuania-Hungary men's European qualifying match 31-46 (he scored 2 goals). He was 11th with the Hungarian team at the 2023 World Youth Championship. He was included in the large squad of the 2023 World Men's Handball Championship, but in the end he will not become a member of the narrow squad. As a member of the junior national team, he participated in the 2024 Junior European Championship where the Hungarian team became the 12th. He was included in the large squad of the 2024 European Men's Handball Championship, but in the end he will not become a member of the narrow squad. He was included in the large squad of the 2025 World Men's Handball Championship, but in the end he will not become a member of the narrow squad.

== Honours ==
=== Club ===
Pick Szeged

- Nemzeti Bajnokság I
  - Silver: 2023
- Magyar Kupa
  - Silver: 2023

NEKA

- Magyar Kupa
  - Bronze: 2024

ONE Veszprém

- IHF Super Globe
  - Silver: 2025
- Nemzeti Bajnokság I
  - Gold: 2026
- Magyar Kupa
  - Gold: 2026
