= Tamás Papp =

Hungarian handball player (born 2002)

Personal information
- Nationality: Hungarian
- Born: 11 November 2002 (age 23) Budapest, Hungary
- Height: 1.83 m (6 ft 0 in)

Sport
- Sport: Handball
- Position: Pivot
- Current club: MOL Tatabánya KC
- Number: 22

Youth career
- Years: Team
- 2014–2016: Budapest Kézilabda KFT
- 2016–2017: PLER-Budapest
- 2017–2018: NEKA

Senior clubs
- Years: Team
- 2018–2023: (Hungary) NEKA
- 2023–2025: (Hungary) Csurgói KK
- 2025–: (Hungary) MOL Tatabánya KC
National team
Years	Team	Apps	(Gls)
2025–	Hungary	3	(7)
Medal record
Junior World Championship
Silver medal – second place	2023 Germany/Greece

Tamás Papp (born 11 November 2002) is a Hungarian handball player who plays for MOL Tatabánya KC and the Hungary national team.

== Career ==
=== Club ===
Tamás started his career in Budapest Kézilabda KFT. From there he transferred to the PLER-Budapest team. Moved from PLER-Budapest to Balatonboglár, the National Handball Academy (NEKA) in 2017. He made his debut in the first team in NEKA in 2018, and in that season he scored 7 goals in 7 matches in the then still Nemzeti Bajnokság I/B team. In 2021, NEKA was promoted to the first division, Nemzeti Bajnokság I, Tamás scored 67 goals in the season. After 6 years at NEKA, it was announced in March 2023 that he will continue his career in Csurgói KK from the summer. In the summer of 2025, he transferred to MOL Tatabánya KC. In 2026, the team reached the final of the Hungarian Cup, but were defeated there by ONE Veszprém. Tamás scored 2 goals in the final.

=== National team ===
He was 9th with the Hungarian team at the 2021 Youth European Championship. As a member of the junior national team, he participated in the 2022 Junior European Championship where the Hungarian team became the 5th. He participated in the 2023 Junior World Championship, where Hungary won the silver medal. The captain of the Hungarian national team, Chema Rodríguez, also noticed his performance, who invited him to practice with the national team from September 30 to October 4, 2024. He was included in the large squad of the 2025 World Men's Handball Championship, but in the end he will not become a member of the narrow squad. He made his debut for the Hungarian men's adult national team on May 7, 2025, in Hlohovec, in a European Championship qualifying match against Slovakia, where the Hungarian national team defeated the Slovak national team 39–24. Tamás scored 5 goals in the match. He was included in the large squad of the 2026 European Men's Handball Championship, end he will become a member of the narrow squad. He finished 10th with the national team at the European Championship, scoring 0 goals in 2 matches.

== Honours ==
=== National team ===
- Junior World Championship:
  - Silver: 2023

=== Club ===
==== NEKA ====
- Nemzeti Bajnokság I/B
  - Gold: 2021

MOL Tatabánya KC

- EHF European Cup:
  - Silver: 2026
- Nemzeti Bajnokság I:
  - Bronze: 2026
- Magyar Kupa
  - Silver: 2026
