= Dániel Sztraka =

Hungarian handball player (born 2003)

Personal information
- Nationality: Hungarian
- Born: 24 November 2003 (age 22) Budapest, Hungary
- Height: 1.81 m (5 ft 11 in)

Sport
- Sport: Handball
- Position: Central Back
- Current club: MOL-Tatabánya KC
- Number: 24

Youth career
- Years: Team
- 2014–2017: Budapest Kézilabda KFT
- 2017–2021: PLER-Budapest

Senior clubs
- Years: Team
- 2021–2022: (Hungary) PLER-Budapest
- 2022–2024: (Hungary) NEKA
- 2024–: (Hungary) MOL-Tatabánya KC
- 2024–2025: → (Hungary) PLER-Budapest (loan)
National team
- Years: Team
- –: Hungary junior
Medal record
Junior World Championship
Silver medal – second place	2023 Germany/Greece

Dániel Sztraka (born 24 November 2003) is a Hungarian handball player who plays for MOL-Tatabánya KC.

== Career ==
=== Club ===
Dániel started his career in Budapest Kézilabda KFT. From there he transferred to the PLER-Budapest team. He played here for the first time in the Nemzeti Bajnokság I/B in the 2021/2022 season, scoring 65 goals in 20 games. In the summer of 2022, he signed for the first-class NEKA team. He made his debut in Nemzeti Bajnokság I in the 2022/23 season, scoring 84 goals in 24 games. In the spring of 2024, NEKA won a bronze medal in the cup to a huge surprise. He was signed by MOL-Tatabánya KC in the summer of 2024, but he was immediately loaned to the PLER-Budapest team. In 2026, he reached the Hungarian Cup final with MOL-Tatabánya KC, but lost to ONE Veszprém. Dániel scored 1 goal in the final.

=== National team ===
As a member of the junior national team, he participated in the 2022 Junior European Championship where the Hungarian team became the 5th. He participated in the 2023 Junior World Championship, where Hungary won the silver medal. The captain of the Hungarian national team, Chema Rodríguez, also noticed his performance, who invited him to practice with the national team from September 30 to October 4, 2024. He was included in the large squad of the 2026 European Men's Handball Championship, but in the end he will not become a member of the narrow squad.

== Honours ==
=== National team ===
- Junior World Championship:
  - Silver: 2023

=== Club ===
PLER-Budapest

- Nemzeti Bajnokság I/B
  - Bronze: 2022

NEKA

- Magyar Kupa:
  - Bronze: 2024

MOL Tatabánya KC

- EHF European Cup:
  - Silver: 2026
- Nemzeti Bajnokság I:
  - Bronze: 2026
- Magyar Kupa
  - Silver: 2026
