= Gábor Temesvári =

Hungarian handball player (born 2002)

Personal information
- Full name: Gábor Péter Temesvári
- Nationality: Hungarian
- Born: 29 March 2002 (age 24) Gyula, Hungary
- Height: 2.10 m (6 ft 11 in)

Sport
- Sport: Handball
- Position: Right Back
- Current club: MOL Tatabánya KC
- Number: 25

Youth career
- Years: Team
- 2014–2017: Békési FKC
- 2017–2019: NEKA

Senior clubs
- Years: Team
- 2019–2025: (Hungary) NEKA
- 2025–: (Hungary) MOL Tatabánya KC
National team
- Years: Team
- –: Hungary junior
Medal record
Junior World Championship
Silver medal – second place	2023 Germany/Greece

Gábor Temesvári (born 29 March 2002) is a Hungarian handball player who plays for MOL Tatabánya KC.

== Career ==
=== Club ===
Gábor started his career in Békési FKC. Moved from Békési FKC to Balatonboglár, the National Handball Academy (NEKA) in 2017. He made his debut in the first team in NEKA in 2019, and in that season he scored 10 goals in 16 matches in the then still Nemzeti Bajnokság I/B team. In 2021, NEKA was promoted to the first division, Nemzeti Bajnokság I, Gábor scored 42 goals in the season. He made his debut in Nemzeti Bajnokság I in the 2021/22 season, scoring 47 goals in 26 games. On November 17, 2023, cartilage surgery was performed on his knee, and he recovered by the start of the 2024/25 championship. In the spring of 2024, NEKA surprisingly won a bronze medal in the cup, where Gábor could not play because of his injury. In the summer of 2025, he transferred to MOL Tatabánya KC. In 2026, the team reached the final of the Hungarian Cup, but were defeated there by ONE Veszprém. Gábor could not play in the final due to injury.

=== National team ===
He was 9th with the Hungarian team at the 2021 Youth European Championship. As a member of the junior national team, he participated in the 2022 Junior European Championship where the Hungarian team became the 5th. He participated in the 2023 Junior World Championship, where Hungary won the silver medal.

== Honours ==
=== National team ===
- Junior World Championship:
  - Silver: 2023

=== Club ===
NEKA

- Nemzeti Bajnokság I/B
  - Gold: 2021
- Magyar Kupa:
  - Bronze: 2024

MOL Tatabánya KC

- EHF European Cup:
  - Silver: 2026
- Nemzeti Bajnokság I:
  - Bronze: 2026
- Magyar Kupa
  - Silver: 2026
