= Levente Tóth (handballer) =

Hungarian handball player (born 2005)

Personal information
- Nationality: Hungarian
- Born: 2 January 2005 (age 21) Székesfehérvár, Hungary
- Height: 1.88 m (6 ft 2 in)

Sport
- Sport: Handball
- Position: Central Back
- Current club: MOL Tatabánya KC
- Number: 90

Youth career
- Years: Team
- 2014–2019: Budapest Kézilabda KFT
- 2019–2021: Ferencvárosi TC

Senior clubs
- Years: Team
- 2021–2022: (Hungary) Ferencvárosi TC
- 2022–2023: (Hungary) BFKA-Balatonfüred
- 2023–2026: (Hungary) NEKA
- 2026–: (Hungary) MOL Tatabánya KC
National team
- Years: Team
- –: Hungary junior

Levente Tóth (born 2 January 2005) is a Hungarian handball player who plays for MOL Tatabánya KC.

== Career ==
=== Club ===
Levente started his career in Budapest Kézilabda KFT. He joined the Ferencvárosi TC youth team in 2019, progressed through the age groups, and played in the adult Nemzeti Bajnokság I/B with the Ferencvárosi TC U21 team in the 2021/22 season, scoring 29 goals in 19 games. In 2022, he joined the Balatonfüred Handball Academy (BFKA-Balatonfüred). Here he also played in the Nemzeti Bajnokság I/B, scoring 84 goals in 30 games. He moved from BFKA-Balatonfüred to Balatonboglár, the National Handball Academy (NEKA) in 2023. Here he played in the first division and scored 59 goals in 23 games in his first Nemzeti Bajnokság I season. In the spring of 2024, NEKA won a bronze medal in the cup to a huge surprise. After 3 seasons, Levente moved to MOL Tatabánya KC in 2026.

=== National team ===
He was 4th with the Hungarian team at the 2022 Youth European Championship. He was 11th with the Hungarian team at the 2023 World Youth Championship. As a member of the junior national team, he participated in the 2024 Junior European Championship where the Hungarian team became the 12th. The captain of the Hungarian national team, Chema Rodríguez, also noticed his performance, who invited him to practice with the national team from September 30 to October 4, 2024. He was 14th with the Hungarian team at the 2025 Junior World Championship. He was included in the large squad of the 2025 World Men's Handball Championship, but in the end he will not become a member of the narrow squad. The captain of the Hungarian national team, Chema Rodríguez, also noticed his performance, who invited him to practice with the national team from December 12 to December 17, 2025. He was included in the large squad of the 2026 European Men's Handball Championship, but in the end he will not become a member of the narrow squad.

== Honours ==
=== Club ===
NEKA

- Magyar Kupa:
  - Bronze: 2024
