= Zsolt Krakovszki =

Hungarian handball player (born 2002)

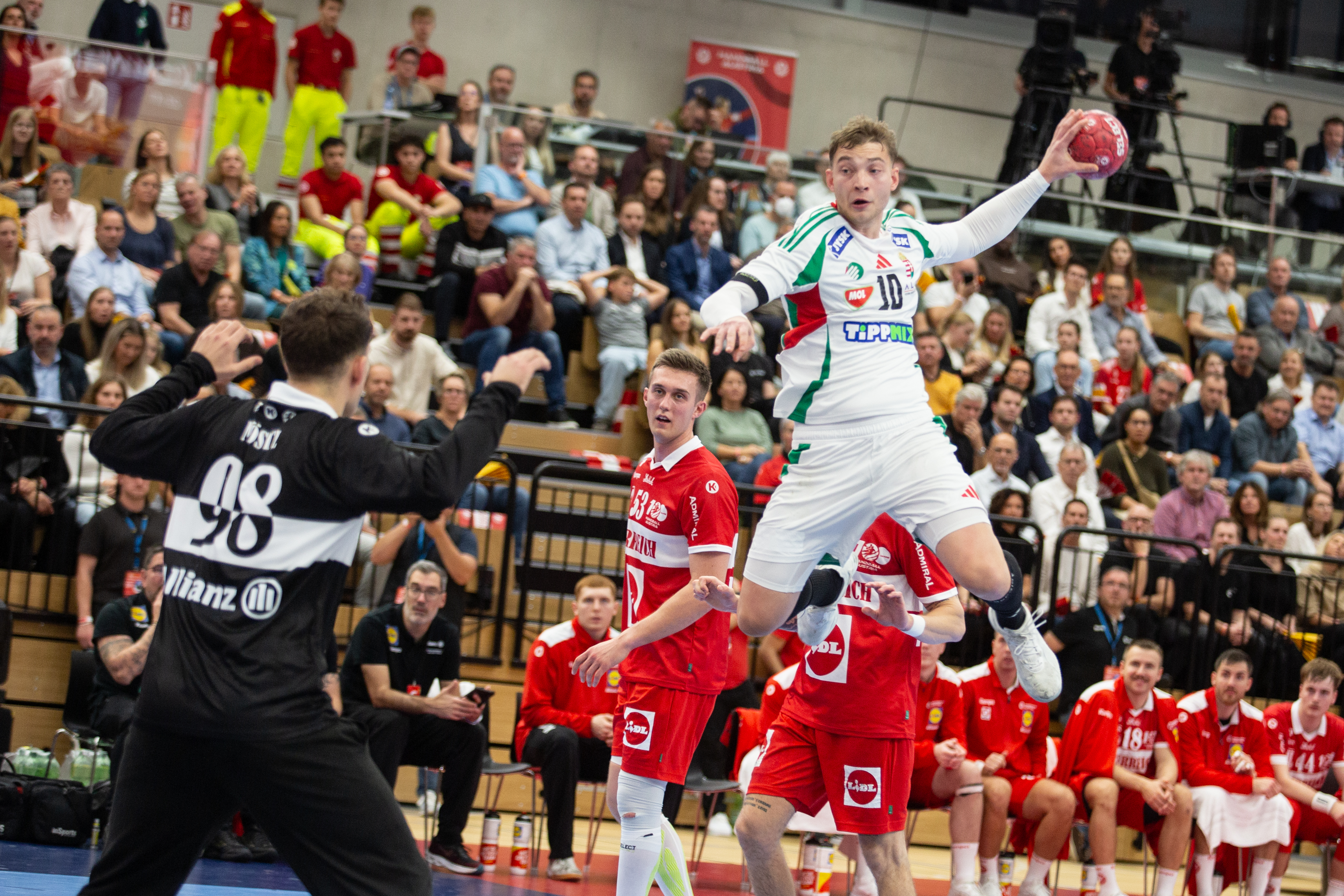

Personal information
- Nationality: Hungarian
- Born: 9 July 2002 (age 24) Győr, Hungary
- Height: 1.87 m (6 ft 2 in)

Sport
- Sport: Handball
- Position: Right wing
- Current club: Győri ETO-UNI FKC
- Number: 10

Youth career
- Years: Team
- 2014–2017: Győri FKKA
- 2017–2019: NEKA

Senior clubs
- Years: Team
- 2019–2024: (Hungary) NEKA
- 2024–2025: (Germany) HSG Wetzlar
- 2025–: (Hungary) Győri ETO-UNI FKC
National team
Years	Team	Apps	(Gls)
2023–	Hungary	21	(37)
Medal record
Junior World Championship
Silver medal – second place	2023 Germany/Greece

Zsolt Krakovszki (born 9 July 2002) is a Hungarian handball player who plays for Győri ETO-UNI FKC and the Hungary national team.

== Career ==
=== Club ===
Zsolt and his twin brother Bence moved from Győr to Balatonboglár, the National Handball Academy (NEKA) in 2017. He made his debut in the first team in NEKA in 2019, and in that season he scored 10 goals in 9 matches in the then still Nemzeti Bajnokság I/B team. In 2021, NEKA was promoted to the first division, Nemzeti Bajnokság I, Zsolt scored 24 goals in the season. After 7 years at NEKA, it was announced in March 2024 that he will continue his career in the German HSG Wetzlar team from the summer. In the spring of 2024, NEKA won a bronze medal in the cup to a huge surprise. In March 2025, it was announced that he would return home from Germany and sign with Győri ETO-UNI FKC.

=== National team ===
As a member of the junior national team, he participated in the 2022 Junior European Championship where the Hungarian team became the 5th. He was included in the extended squad for the 2023 World Men's Handball Championship, but in the end was not selected for the final tournament. At the age of 20, on 9 March 2023, he made his debut in the senior national team in Schaffhausen in the Switzerland–Hungary men's European qualifying match 32–37. He participated in the 2023 Junior World Championship, where Hungary won the silver medal. He also participated in the 2024 European Men's Handball Championship as a member of the Hungary men's national handball team. (5th place, 2 games / 4 goals). He was included in the large squad of the men's handball team participating in the 2024 Paris Olympics, but in the end he was not included in the traveling team. He also participated in the 2025 World Men's Handball Championship as a member of the Hungary men's national handball team. (8th place, 3 matches / 5 goals). He was included in the large squad of the 2026 European Men's Handball Championship, but he suffered an ankle injury before the tournament, so he was not included in the traveling team.

== Personal life ==
He has a twin brother, Bence Krakovszki, who plays as a left winger. He is also a professional handball player and Hungary national team player.

== Honours ==
=== National team ===
- Junior World Championship:
  - Silver: 2023

=== Club ===
NEKA

- Nemzeti Bajnokság I/B
  - Gold: 2021
- Magyar Kupa:
  - Bronze: 2024
