= Bence Krakovszki =

Hungarian handball player (born 2002)

Personal information
- Nationality: Hungarian
- Born: 9 July 2002 (age 24) Győr, Hungary
- Height: 1.87 m (6 ft 2 in)

Sport
- Sport: Handball
- Position: Left wing
- Current club: MOL Tatabánya KC
- Number: 88

Youth career
- Years: Team
- 2014–2017: Győri FKKA
- 2017–2019: NEKA

Senior clubs
- Years: Team
- 2019–2023: NEKA
- 2023–2026: MOL Tatabánya KC
- 2026–: Győri ETO-UNI FKC
National team
Years	Team	Apps	(Gls)
2023–	Hungary	30	(46)
Medal record
Junior World Championship
Silver medal – second place	2023 Germany/Greece

Bence Krakovszki (born 9 July 2002) is a Hungarian handball player who plays for MOL Tatabánya KC and the Hungary national team.

== Career ==
=== Club ===
Bence and his twin brother Zsolt moved from Győr to Balatonboglár, the National Handball Academy (NEKA) in 2017. He made his debut in the first team in NEKA in 2019, and in that season he scored 3 goals in 7 matches in the then still Nemzeti Bajnokság I/B team. In 2021, NEKA was promoted to the first division, Nemzeti Bajnokság I, Bence scored 79 goals in the season. After 6 years at NEKA, it was announced in May 2023 that he would continue his career in one of the best Hungarian teams, MOL Tatabánya KC. In 2024, he won the bronze medal in the championship with the team. In 2025 the MOL Tatabánya KC team won bronze in the Hungarian Cup, Bence scored 8 goals in the bronze medal match. In 2026, the team reached the final of the Hungarian Cup, but were defeated there by ONE Veszprém. Bence scored 1 goal in the final.

=== National team ===
As a member of the junior national team, he participated in the 2022 Junior European Championship where the Hungarian team became the 5th. He was included in the extended squad for the 2022 European Men's Handball Championship, but in the end was not selected for the final tournament. A year later, he was included in the extended squad for the 2023 World Men's Handball Championship, but in the end was dropped once again. At the age of 20, on March 9, 2023, he made his debut in the senior national team in Schaffhausen in the Switzerland–Hungary men's European qualifying match 32–37, where he scored 2 goals. He participated in the 2023 Junior World Championship, where Hungary won the silver medal. He was also a member of the 2024 European Men's Handball Championship squad, but he did not play in a single match at the European Championship. He was included in the large squad of the men's handball team participating in the 2024 Paris Olympics, but in the end he was not included in the traveling team. He also participated in the 2025 World Men's Handball Championship as a member of the Hungary men's national handball team. (8th place, 2 matches / 4 goals). He also participated in the 2026 European Men's Handball Championship as a member of the Hungary men's national handball team. (10th place, 7 games / 3 goals).

== Personal life ==
He has a twin brother, Zsolt Krakovszki, who plays as a right winger. He is also a professional handball player and Hungary national team player.

== Honours ==
=== National team ===
- Junior World Championship:
  - Silver: 2023

=== Club ===
NEKA

- Nemzeti Bajnokság I/B
  - Gold: 2021

MOL Tatabánya KC

- EHF European Cup:
  - Silver: 2026
- Nemzeti Bajnokság I:
  - Bronze: 2024, 2026
- Magyar Kupa
  - Silver: 2026
  - Bronze: 2025
