= National Academy of Handball =

Hungarian handball club

Nemzeti Kézilabda Akadémia
- Full name: Nemzeti Kézilabda Akadémia
- Short name: NEKA
- Founded: 2013
- Arena: NEKA Sportcsarnok
- Capacity: 678
- Head coach: László Sótonyi (men's); Beáta Bohus (women's)
- League: Nemzeti Bajnokság I (men's); Nemzeti Bajnokság I (women's)
- 2021–22: Nemzeti Bajnokság I, 12th (men's); Nemzeti Bajnokság I/B, 1st (women's)
- Club colours
Home	Away

The National Academy of Handball (Hungarian: Nemzeti Kézilabda Akadémia, commonly abbreviated NEKA) is a Hungarian state-funded handball training and developing center run by the Hungarian Handball Federation. Located in Balatonboglár, it offers an integrated four year education for students in grades 9–12. In addition, it is open for Hungarian international junior handballers (aged 18–21) under a trilateral agreement between the academy, the players' club and the players itself.

Location of NEKA

== Men's handball team ==
=== Crest, colours, supporters ===
==== Kits ====
HOME
2016–17	2017–18	2018–20	2020–21	2021–

AWAY
2016–17	2017–18	2018–20	2020–21	2021–

THIRD
2016–17	2017–18	2018–19	2019–20	2020–21	2021–22	2022–23	2023–24

=== Team ===
==== Current squad ====
Squad for the 2023–24 season

HSA NEKA

Goalkeepers

- 16 (Hungary) Krisztián Mikler
- 88 (Hungary) Xavér Deményi

Left Wingers

- 13 (Hungary) Erhárd Sisa
- 88 (Hungary) Robin Molnár

Right Wingers

- 3 (Hungary) Balázs Szűcs
- 10 (Hungary) Zsolt Krakovszki
- 80 (Hungary) Bálint Bodnár

Line Players

- 52 (Hungary) Bence Bali
- 64 (Hungary) Dominik Gál
- 84 (Hungary) Miklós Karai

Left Backs

- 26 (Hungary) Márkó Tárnoki
- 32 (Hungary) Tamás Kovács
- 29 (Hungary) Marcell Ludmán

Centre Backs

- 19 (Hungary) Dániel Sztraka
- 22 (Hungary) Botond Kanyó
- 89 (Hungary) Levente Tóth

Right Backs

- 2 (Hungary) Gábor Temesvári
- 20 (Hungary) Sándor Kathi
- 38 (Hungary) Márton Dely (c)
- (Hungary) Ádám Nagy

==== Technical staff ====
- Head coach: (Hungary) László Sótonyi
- Goalkeeping coach: (Hungary) Zsolt Perger
- Fitness coach: (Hungary) Dániel Huszár
- Physiotherapist: (Hungary) Ádám Békési
- Masseur: (Hungary) László Polgár

==== Transfers ====
Transfers for the 2026–27 season

Joining

- (Hungary) Tibor Nagy (GK) from (Hungary) Budakalász FKC
- (Hungary) Zalán Maracskó (RW) from (Hungary) Csurgói KK
- (Hungary) Máté Kucsera (RW) on loan from (Hungary) OTP Bank - Pick Szeged U21
- (Hungary) Kornél Lukács (CB) on loan from (Hungary) OTP Bank - Pick Szeged U21
- (Hungary) Máté Borsos (GK) on loan from (Hungary) PLER-Budapest
- (Hungary) Márkó Tárnoki (LW) from (Hungary) Győri ETO-UNI FKC
- (Hungary) Ákos Széles (RB) from (Germany) TV Emsdetten
- (Hungary) Botond Apró (CB) on loan from (Hungary) ONE Veszprém U21
- (Hungary) Levente Szabó (LP) on loan from (Hungary) ONE Veszprém U21

Leaving

- (Hungary) Levente Tóth (CB) to (Hungary) MOL Tatabánya KC
- (Hungary) Tamás Kovács (LB) to (Hungary) Győri ETO-UNI FKC
- (Hungary) Sándor Kathi (RB) to (Hungary) Csurgói KK
- (Hungary) Balázs Szűcs (RW) to (Hungary) Csurgói KK
- (Hungary) János Podoba (GK) to (Hungary) Balatonfüredi KSE
- (Hungary) Péter Grünfelder (LP) to (Hungary) Várpalotai BSK
- (Hungary) Szabolcs Gulyás (GK) to (Hungary) PLER-Budapest
- (Hungary) Krisztián Mikler (GK) loan back to (Hungary) ONE Veszprém
- (Hungary) Zsombor Szepesi (LW) loan back to (Hungary) OTP Bank - Pick Szeged
- (Hungary) Botond Szladovics (RB) on loan at (Hungary) Dabas KK

Transfers for the 2025–26 season

Joining

- (Hungary) Ádám Török (CB) from (Hungary) Dabas KK
- (Hungary) Dominik Kovács (LW) from (Hungary) Budakalász FKC
- (Hungary) Dániel Balogh (LB) from (Hungary) OTP Bank - Pick Szeged U21
- (Hungary) Zsombor Szepesi (LW) on loan from (Hungary) OTP Bank - Pick Szeged
- (Hungary) Máté Mészáros (LP) on loan from (Hungary) Ferencvárosi TC
- (Hungary) Márk Vári (RB) from (Hungary) Balatonfüredi KSE
- (Hungary) Bence Bali (LP) back from loan at (Hungary) Veszprémi KKFT

Leaving

- (Hungary) Robin Molnár (LW) to (Hungary) ONE Veszprém
- (Hungary) Gábor Temesvári (RB) to (Hungary) MOL Tatabánya KC
- (Hungary) Márkó Tárnoki (LW) to (Hungary) Győri ETO-UNI FKC
- (Hungary) Zakor Zalán (LP) to (Hungary) Győri ETO-UNI FKC
- (Hungary) Marcell Ludmán (LB) to (Spain) CB Cangas
- (Hungary) Benedek Pintér (CB) to (Croatia) HRK Karlovac
- (Hungary) Dávid Hajzer (LP) to (Hungary) Dabas KK
- (Hungary) Áron Császár (LB) to (Hungary) Dabas KK
- (Hungary) Bence Bali (LP) to (Hungary) Mezőkövesdi KC
- (Hungary) Marko Eklemović (CB) loan back to (Hungary) MOL Tatabánya KC
- (Hungary) Nándor Győri (GK) loan back to (Hungary) BFKA-Veszprém
- (Hungary) Richárd Csanálosi (RW) on loan at (Hungary) Ferencvárosi TC
- (Hungary) Szabolcs Viski (LP) on loan at (Hungary) OTP Bank - Pick Szeged U21

Transfers for the 2024–25 season

Joining

- (Hungary) Benedek Pintér (CB) from (Hungary) Fejér B.Á.L. Veszprém
- (Hungary) Dávid Bugyáki (LP) from (Hungary) Fejér B.Á.L. Veszprém
- (Hungary) János Podoba (GK) from (Hungary) HE-DO B. Braun Gyöngyös
- (Hungary) Szabolcs Viski (LP) from (Hungary) BFKA-Veszprém
- (Hungary) Márton Kardos (LB) from (Hungary) Budapesti Honvéd SE
- (Hungary) Bence Bali (LP) from (Hungary) Győri ETO-UNI FKC
- (Hungary) Péter Gazsó (CB) from (Hungary) OTP Bank - Pick Szeged U21
- (Hungary) Sándor Kathi (RB) back from loan at (Hungary) Győri ETO-UNI FKC
- (Hungary) Nándor Győri (GK) back from loan at (Hungary) BFKA-Veszprém
- (Hungary) Marko Eklemović (CB) on loan from (Hungary) MOL Tatabánya KC
- (Hungary) Péter Grünfelder (LP) from (Hungary) Veszprémi KKFT

Leaving

- (Hungary) Zsolt Krakovszki (RW) to (Germany) HSG Wetzlar
- (Hungary) Dániel Sztraka (CB) to (Hungary) MOL Tatabánya KC
- (Hungary) Márton Dely (RB) to (Hungary) Győri ETO-UNI FKC
- (Hungary) Péter Csányi (GK) to (Hungary) Győri ETO-UNI FKC
- (Hungary) Dominik Gál (LP) to (Romania) CSM Vaslui
- (Hungary) Xavér Deményi (GK) to (Hungary) Balatonfüredi KSE
- (Hungary) Levente Tisza (RW) to (Hungary) Dabas KK
- (Hungary) Márk Juráskó (RB) to (Hungary) Ceglédi KKSE
- (Hungary) Kristóf Sikler (RB) to (Hungary) Győri ETO-UNI FKC
- (Hungary) Erhárd Sisa (LW) (retires)
- (Hungary) Miklós Karai (LP) loan back to (Hungary) Ferencvárosi TC
- (Hungary) Bence Bali (LP) on loan at (Hungary) Veszprémi KKFT
- (Hungary) Botond Kanyó (CB) to (Hungary) Rákosmenti KSK

Transfers for the 2023–24 season

Joining

- (Hungary) Robin Molnár (LW) from (Hungary) Pick Szeged
- (Hungary) Marcell Ludmán (LB) from (Hungary) Fejér B.Á.L. Veszprém
- (Hungary) Dominik Gál (LP) from (Hungary) Fejér B.Á.L. Veszprém
- (Hungary) Levente Tóth (CB) from (Hungary) BFKA-Balatonfüred
- (Hungary) Dániel Csányi (LP) from (Hungary) Sport36-Komló
- (Hungary) Krisztián Mikler (GK) on loan from (Hungary) BFKA-Veszprém
- (Hungary) Balázs Szűcs (RW) from (Hungary) BFKA-Veszprém
- (Hungary) Ádám Nagy (RB) on loan from (Hungary) HE-DO B. Braun Gyöngyös

Leaving

- (Hungary) Bence Krakovszki (LW) to (Hungary) MOL Tatabánya KC
- (Hungary) (Romania) Dániel Fekete (LB) to (Finland) Riihimäki Cocks
- (Hungary) Péter Ács (CB) to (Hungary) PLER-Budapest
- (Hungary) Tamás Papp (LP) to (Hungary) Csurgói KK
- (Hungary) Bence Dobi (CB) to (Hungary) Ceglédi KKSE
- (Hungary) Kristóf Palasics (GK) loan back to (Hungary) Telekom Veszprém
- (Hungary) Gellért Draskovics (LB) loan back to (Hungary) Balatonfüredi KSE
- (Hungary) Brunó Bajus (LW) loan back to (Hungary) Pick Szeged
- (Hungary) Benjámin Szilágyi (RW) loan back to (Hungary) Pick Szeged
- (Hungary) Nándor Győri (GK) on loan at (Hungary) BFKA-Veszprém
- (Hungary) Bence Bali (LP) on loan at (Hungary) Győri ETO-UNI FKC
- (Hungary) Gergő Kovács (CB) to (Hungary) HE-DO B. Braun Gyöngyös
- (Hungary) Dániel Csányi (LP) to (Spain) CB Eón Alicante
- (Hungary) Sándor Kathi (RB) on loan at (Hungary) Győri ETO-UNI FKC

Transfers for the 2021–22 season

Joining

- (Hungary) Bence Mikita (CB) from (Spain) CB San Jose Obrero
- (Hungary) László Szeitl (LP) from (Hungary) Veszprém KKFT Felsőörs
- (Hungary) Mátyás Simotics (LP) from (Hungary) Vecsési SE
- (Hungary) Axel Kiss (RW) from (Hungary) Orosházi FKSE
- (Hungary) Erhárd Sisa (LW) from (Hungary) BFKA-Veszprém U22
- (Hungary) (Romania) Dániel Fekete (LB) from (Hungary) Pick Szeged
- (Hungary) Brunó Bajus (LW) on loan from (Hungary) Pick Szeged
- (Hungary) Kristóf Palasics (GK) on loan from (Hungary) Telekom Veszprém
- (Hungary) Gellért Draskovics (LB) on loan from (Hungary) Balatonfüredi KSE

Leaving

- (Hungary) Péter Tóth (RW) to (Hungary) Veszprém KKFT Felsőörs
- (Hungary) Dávid Foki (CB) to (Hungary) PLER KC
- (Hungary) Dominik Kovács (LW) to (Hungary) Budakalász FKC
- (Hungary) Márk Dávid (LP) to (Hungary) Békési FKC
- (Hungary) László Szeitl (LP) to (Hungary) Csurgói KK

=== Top scorers ===
Season	Player	Apps/Goals
2022–2023	(Hungary) Tamás Papp	25/89

=== Honours ===
Honours		No.	Years
League
Nemzeti Bajnokság I/B	Winners	1	2020–21
Nemzeti Bajnokság I/B	Third Place	1	2018–19

=== Recent seasons ===
- Seasons in Nemzeti Bajnokság I: 4
- Seasons in Nemzeti Bajnokság I/B: 5

Season	Division	Pos.	Magyar kupa
2015–16	NB II Délnyugat	1st	
2016–17	NB I/B Nyugat	12th	Round 1
2017–18	NB I/B Nyugat	8th	Round 3
2018–19	NB I/B Nyugat	3th	Round 1
2019–20	NB I/B Nyugat	Cancelled	
2020–21	NB I/B Nyugat	1st	Round 3
2021–22	NB I	12th	Round 3
2022–23	NB I	8th	Quarterfinals
2023–24	NB I	13th	3rd place
2024–25	NB I	11th	Quarterfinals

== Women's team ==
The first team of NEKA has regularly competed in the Nemzeti Bajnokság I/B. For the 2020–21 season they signed an agreement with Szent István SE that the two teams would unite and compete as one team in the Nemzeti Bajnokság I under the name Boglári Akadémia-SZISE. The union is often referred to as SZISE-NEKA.

=== Kits ===
HOME
2013–14	2015–17	2017–18	2018–20	2020–

AWAY
2013–14	2015–17	2017–18	2018–20	2020–

THIRD
2013–14	2015–17	2018–19	2019–20	2020–21	2021–22	2023–24

=== Current squad ===
Squad for the 2025–26 season

NEKA
Goalkeepers: 99 (Hungary) Kincső Csapó; 1 (Hungary) Anna Hornyák; 61 (Hungary) Zsuzsanna Németh; Left Wingers: 22 (Hungary) Krisztina Berei; 97 (Hungary) Eszter Farkas; 4 (Hungary) Hanna Miháy; Right Wingers: 44 (Hungary) Lujza Katona; 31 (Hungary) Csenge Kiss; 41 (Hungary) Lara Nényei; Line Players: 72 (Hungary) Zoé Alaxai; 7 (Hungary) Liza Seres; 62 (Hungary) Réka Sztankovics	Central Backs: 26 (Hungary) Eszter Bozsodi; 82 (Hungary) Laura Himer; 75 (Hungary) Fanni Török; 95 (Hungary) Aida Szabó; Left Backs: 70 (Hungary) Fanni Jelena; 66 (Hungary) Fruzsina Molnár; 13 (Hungary) Réka Molnár; 81 (Hungary) Anna Panyi; 6 (Hungary) Petra Koronczai; 19 (Hungary) Villő Mózsi; 54 (Hungary) Linda Utasi; Right Backs: 88 (Hungary) Diána Ferenczy	Technical staff: Head coach: (Hungary) Botond Bakó; Goalkeeping coach: (Hungary) Melinda Pastrovics; Fitness coach: (Hungary) Ádám Papp; Masseur: (Hungary) Csaba Jenő Orbán

==== Transfers ====
Transfers for the 2024–25 season

Joining

Leaving

== Former club members ==
=== Women's team ===
- (Hungary) Anna Albek (2014–2016)
- (Hungary) Luca Csíkos (2018–2023)
- (Hungary) Lea Faragó (2019–2024)
- (Hungary) Luca Faragó (2017–2020)
- (Hungary) Csenge Fodor (2013–2017)
- (Hungary) Gréta Juhász (2017–2020)
- (Hungary) Blanka Kajdon (2017–2020)
- (Hungary) Noémi Pásztor (2013–2017)
- (Hungary) Emília Varga (2019–2023)
- (Hungary) Petra Vámos (2014–2019)

=== Men's team ===
- (Hungary) Bence Bartha
- (Hungary) Bence Bálint
- (Hungary) Nándor Bognár
- (Hungary) Marcell Gábor
- (Hungary) Kristóf Győri
- (Hungary) (Serbia) Zoran Ilić (2016–2019)
- (Hungary) Bence Krakovszki (2017–2023)
- (Hungary) Kristóf Palasics (2021–2023)
- (Hungary) Zsolt Schäffer
- (Hungary) Péter Tóth (2016–2020)
- (Serbia) (Hungary) Uroš Borzaš

=== Women's team ===
Seasons	Coach	Country
2021–	Beáta Bohus	(Hungary)

=== Men's team ===
Seasons	Coach	Country
2013–2018	János Gyurka	(Hungary)
2018–	László Sótonyi	(Hungary)
