= Kristóf Palasics =

Hungarian handball player (born 2002)

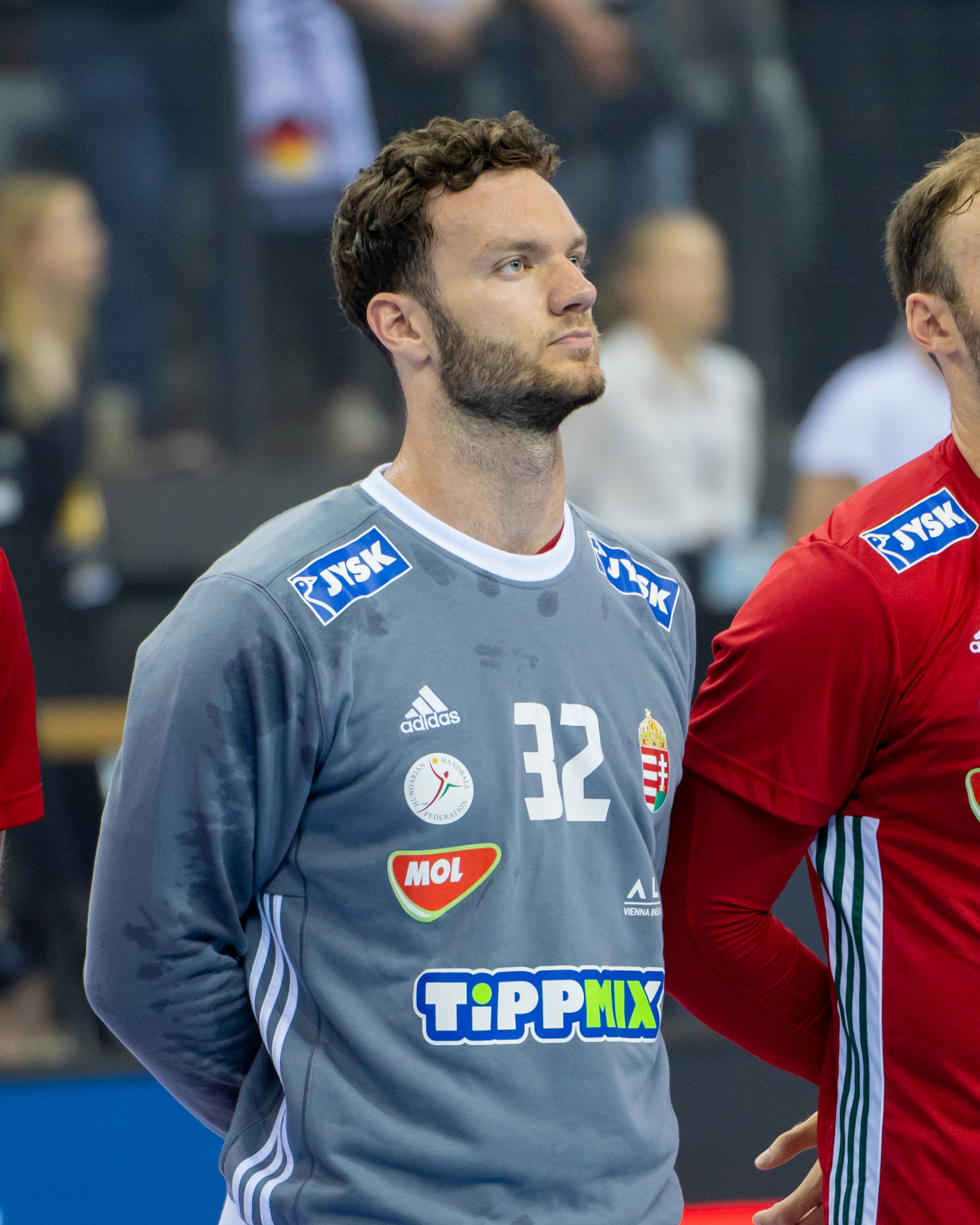

Personal information
- Nationality: Hungarian
- Born: 19 April 2002 (age 24) Kistarcsa, Hungary
- Height: 1.98 m (6 ft 6 in)

Sport
- Sport: Handball
- Position: Goalkeeper
- Current club: MT Melsungen
- Number: 32

Youth career
- Years: Team
- 2014–2016: Gödöllői Főnix ISE
- 2016–2018: PLER-Budapest

Senior clubs
- Years: Team
- 2018–2025: ONE Veszprém
- 2020–2021: → BFKA-Veszprém (loan)
- 2021–2023: → NEKA (loan)
- 2023–2024: → BM Logroño La Rioja (loan)
- 2024–2025: → S.L. Benfica (loan)
- 2025–: MT Melsungen
National team
Years	Team	Apps	(Gls)
2023–	Hungary	46	(2)
Medal record
Junior World Championship
Silver medal – second place	2023 Germany/Greece

Kristóf Palasics (born 19 April 2002) is a Hungarian handball player for MT Melsungen and the Hungary national team.

== Career ==
=== Club ===
Kristóf started his career at Gödöllői Főnix ISE, where he developed his skills under the professional guidance of former top goalkeeper Tamás Zsembery. In 2016, he certified for PLER-Budapest. In August 2018, he signed a contract with Telekom Veszprém. The goalkeeping talent spent the first league seasons - with the exception of a few Nemzeti Bajnokság I matches - in the youth team of the Veszprém team. From the 2020/2021 season, he was a member of the Nemzeti Bajnokság I/B BFKA-Veszprém with a double playing permit. From 2021, he played on loan in the NEKA Nemzeti Bajnokság I team for 2 years. From 2023, he was loaned to BM Logroño La Rioja, the fifth-place team in the Spanish league, for an extra year. He will start the 2024/25 season on loan at the Portuguese team S.L. Benfica. In January 2025, it was announced that he would not extend his contract with Veszprém until the summer of 2025, but would instead join the German team MT Melsungen. Due to Mike Jensen's injury, he was ordered back to Veszprém from his loan contract in March 2025.

=== National team ===
He was 9th with the Hungarian team at the 2021 Youth European Championship. As a member of the junior national team, he participated in the 2022 Junior European Championship where the Hungarian team became the 5th. He was a member of the traveling squad for the 2023 World Men's Handball Championship for the first time in a world tournament, but he did not play in a single match at the World Championship. At the age of 21, on April 30, 2023, he made his debut in the senior national team in Tatabánya in the Hungary-Georgia men's European qualifying match 30–31. He participated in the 2023 Junior World Championship, where Hungary won the silver medal. He also participated in the 2024 European Men's Handball Championship as a member of the Hungary men's national handball team. (5th place, 5 matches / 0 goals). He also participated in the 2024 Paris Olympics, where the Hungarian team finished 10th (4 matches / 0 goals). He also participated in the 2025 World Men's Handball Championship as a member of the Hungary men's national handball team. (8th place, 6 matches / 0 goals). He also participated in the 2026 European Men's Handball Championship as a member of the Hungary men's national handball team. (10th place, 7 games / 1 goals).

== Honours ==
=== National team ===
- Junior World Championship
  - Silver: 2023

=== Club ===
BFKA-Veszprém

- Nemzeti Bajnokság I/B
  - Silver: 2021

BM Logroño La Rioja

- Copa ASOBAL
  - Silver: 2023

ONE Veszprém

- Nemzeti Bajnokság I
  - Gold: 2025
- Magyar Kupa
  - Silver: 2025

MT Melsungen

- EHF European League:
  - Gold: 2026
