= Chema Rodríguez (handballer) =

Spanish handball player and coach (born 1980)

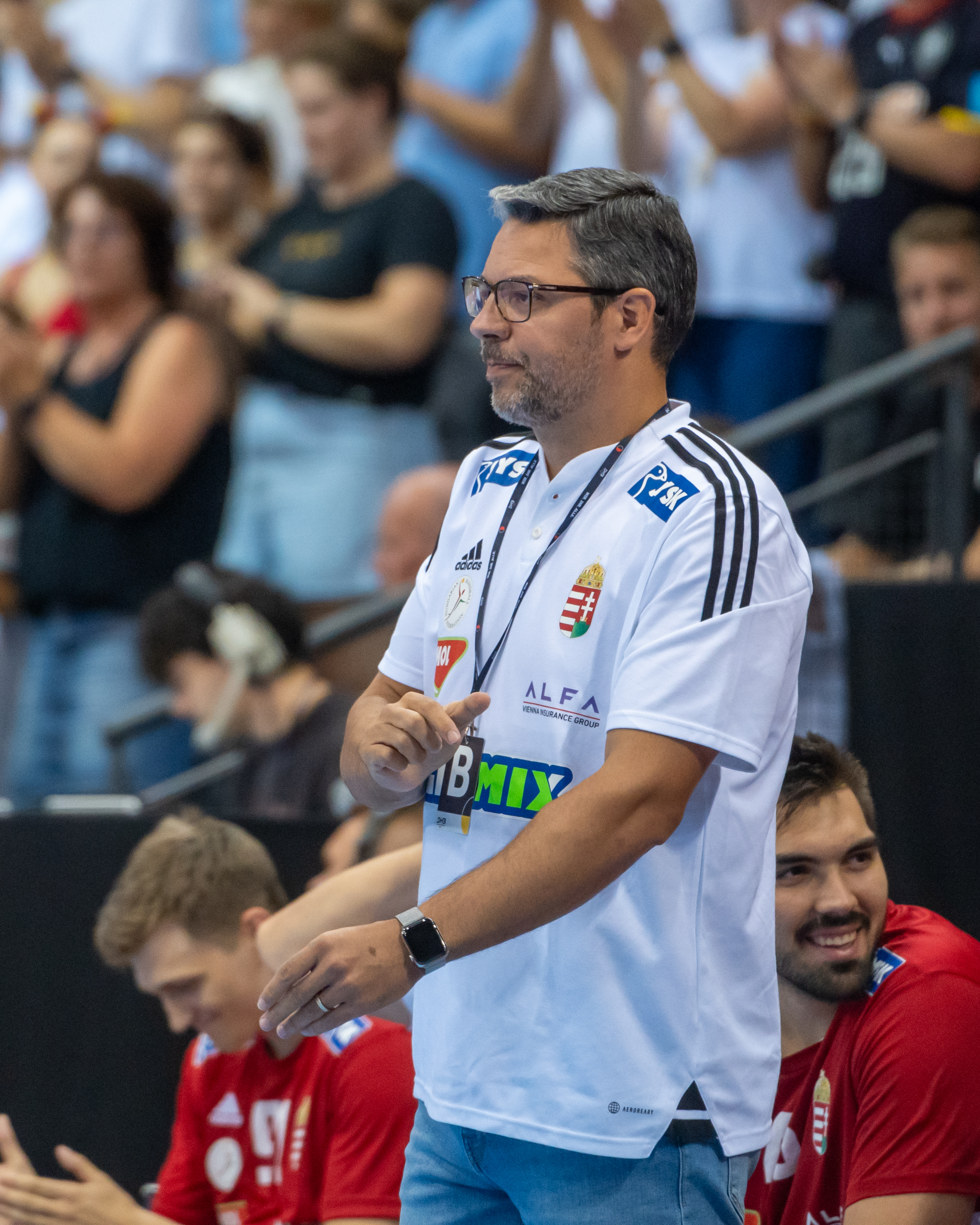
- Rodríguez 2024

Personal information
- Full name: José María Rodríguez Vaquero
- Nationality: Spanish
- Born: 5 January 1980 (age 46) Palencia, Spain
- Height: 1.87 m (6 ft 2 in)

Sport
- Sport: Handball
- Position: Centre back

Senior clubs
- Years: Team
- 1999–2007: BM Valladolid
- 2007–2011: BM Ciudad Real
- 2011–2012: BM Atlético de Madrid
- 2012–2017: Telekom Veszprém
- 2017–2020: Saran Loiret Handball
National team
Years	Team	Apps	(Gls)
–	Spain	127	(159)

Teams managed
- 2019–2022: Hungary (assistant)
- 2020–2023: S.L. Benfica
- 2022–2026: Hungary
Medal record
World Championship
Gold medal – first place	2005 Tunisia	Team competition
European Championship
Silver medal – second place	2006 Switzerland	Team competition

José María Rodríguez Vaquero (born 5 January 1980), commonly known as Chema Rodríguez, is a Spanish handball coach and former player.

== Career ==
Chema Rodríguez started his professional career at BM Valladolid. Here he won the 2003 Copa ASOBAL and the 2005 and 2006 Copa del Rey.

In 2007 BM Ciudad Real for a transfer fee of ca €800,000. This was at the time the world record transfer fee. At BM Ciudad Real he shared the playmaker position with Joan Cañellas. Here he won the 2008 Liga ASOBAL, Copa del Rey and the Spanish Supercup. In 2009 he once again one the Spanish league and the EHF Champions League, and in 2010 for a third time the Spanish League. In 2011 he followed the club as they transitioned to being BM Atlético de Madrid.

A year later he joined Hungarian side MKB Veszprém. Here he won the Hungarian championship and Hungarian cup every season from 2013 to 2017.

In 2017 he joined French side Saran Loiret Handball, where he played until his retirement in 2020.

Rodríguez was part of the team that won gold medals at the 2005 World Championship in Tunisia and silver medals at the 2006 European Championship in Switzerland.

== Coaching career ==
In the summer of 2019 Rodríguez became the assistant coach at the Hungary national team.

In 2020 he got his first position as a head coach at the Portuguese club Benfica Lissabon. Here he won the 2021–22 EHF European League.

In March 2022 he took over as the head coach of the Hungary national team alongside Benfica.

At the end of the 2022–23 season he stopped as the Benfica head coach to be a full time national team coach.

== Honours ==
As coach

- EHF European League: 2021–22
