= 2025–26 Nemzeti Bajnokság I (men's handball) =

Nemzeti Bajnokság I
- Season: 2025–26
- Dates: 31 August 2025 – 2 June 2026
- Champion: ONE Veszprém HC (30th title)
- Relegated: Carbonex-Komló; CYEB-Budakalász
- Champions League: ONE Veszprém HC; OTP Bank-Pick Szeged
- European League: MOL Tatabánya KC
- Matches played: 184
- Goals scored: 10,816 (58.78 per match)
- Top goalscorer: István Mátés (171 goals)

The 2025–26 Nemzeti Bajnokság I (known as the K&H férfi kézilabda liga for sponsorship reasons) was the 75th season of the Nemzeti Bajnokság I, the top men's handball league in Hungary. A total of fourteen teams contested this season's league, which began on 31 August 2025 and concluded on 2 June 2026.

ONE Veszprém HC won their thirtieth title.

== Teams ==
=== Team changes ===
Promoted from 2024–25 Nemzeti Bajnokság I/B	Relegated from 2024–25 Nemzeti Bajnokság I
Szigetszentmiklósi KSK; Budai Farkasok-Rév	Dabas KC; Eger-Eszterházy SzSE

=== Arenas and locations ===
Location of teams in 2025–26 Nemzeti Bajnokság I

The following 14 clubs competed in the Nemzeti Bajnokság I during the 2025–26 season:

Team	Location	Arena	Capacity
Balatonfüredi KSE	Balatonfüred	Szabadidőközpont	712
Budai Farkasok-Rév	Budaörs	Városi Uszoda Sportcsarnok és Strand	905
Budakalász FKC	Budakalász	Városi Sportcsarnok	400
Csurgói KK	Csurgó	Sótonyi László Sportcsarnok	1,200
Ferencvárosi TC	Budapest (Ferencváros)	Elek Gyula Aréna	1,300
Gyöngyösi KK	Gyöngyös	Dr. Fejes András Sportcsarnok	1,100
Győri ETO-UNI FKC	Győr	Magvassy Mihály Sportcsarnok	2,800
Komlói BSK	Komló	Sportközpont	800
NEKA	Balatonboglár	NEKA Csarnok	678
PLER-Budapest	Budapest (Pestszentlőrinc)	BUD Aréna	1,000
SC Pick Szeged	Szeged	Pick Aréna	8,143
Szigetszentmiklósi KSK	Szigetszentmiklós	SZKSK Kézilabda Csarnok	420
Tatabánya KC	Tatabánya	Tatabányai Multifunkcionális Sportcsarnok	6,200
Veszprém KC	Veszprém	Veszprém Aréna	5,096

==== Number of teams by counties and regions ====
Number of teams by counties
Pos.	County	No. of teams	Teams
1	Pest	3	Budai Farkasok-Rév, Budakalász FKC and Szigetszentmiklósi KSK
2	Budapest	2	Ferencvárosi TC and PLER
2	Somogy	2	Csurgói KK and NEKA
2	Veszprém	2	Balatonfüredi KSE and Veszprém KC
5	Baranya	1	Komlói BSK
5	Csongrád-Csanád	1	SC Pick Szeged
5	Győr-Moson-Sopron	1	Győri ETO-UNI FKC
5	Heves	1	Gyöngyösi KK
5	Komárom-Esztergom	1	Tatabánya KC

Number of teams by regions
Transdanubia	Central Hungary	Great Plain and North
Balatonfüred; Csurgói KK; Győri ETO-UNI FKC; Komlói BSK; NEKA; Tatabánya KC; Veszprém KC	Budai Farkasok-Rév; Budakalász FKC; Ferencvárosi TC; PLER-Budapest; Szigetszentmiklósi KSK	Gyöngyösi KK; SC Pick Szeged
7 Teams	5 Teams	2 Teams

== Regular season ==
=== League table ===
Pos	Team	Pld	W	D	L	GF	GA	GD	Pts	Qualification or relegation
1	ONE Veszprém HC	26	26	0	0	1033	715	+318	52	Qualification to the Finals and advance for the Champions League
2	OTP Bank-Pick Szeged	26	22	1	3	929	709	+220	45	Qualification to the Finals and advance for the Champions League
3	MOL Tatabánya KC	26	20	0	6	822	755	+67	40	Qualification for the European League group stage
4	FTC-Green Collect	26	15	2	9	844	800	+44	32	Qualification for the European Cup second qualifying round
5	Balatonfüredi KSE	26	12	2	12	699	751	−52	26	Qualification for the European Cup first qualifying round
6	LIQUI MOLY NEKA	26	11	3	12	722	785	−63	25	
7	PLER-Budapest	26	10	3	13	701	745	−44	23	
8	ETO University HT	26	9	3	14	745	779	−34	21	
9	HE-DO B. Braun Gyöngyös	26	10	0	16	698	752	−54	20	
10	Csurgói KK	26	7	5	14	711	724	−13	19	
11	Budai Farkasok-Rév	26	6	6	14	690	768	−78	18	
12	Szigetszentmiklósi KSK	26	6	4	16	668	765	−97	16	
13	Carbonex-Komló	26	6	3	17	702	778	−76	15	Relegation to the Nemzeti Bajnokság I/B
14	CYEB-Budakalász	26	4	4	18	708	846	−138	12	Relegation to the Nemzeti Bajnokság I/B

Source: Hungarian Handball Federation (in Hungarian), Flashscore
Rules for classification: 1) Points; 2) Head-to-head points; 3) Head-to-head goal difference; 4) Goal difference; 5) Goals scored; 6) Matches won; 7) Draw (Note: Head-to-head record is used only after all the matches between the teams in question have been played)

=== Results ===
Home \ Away	BAL	BFR	BUD	CSU	ETO	FTC	GYÖ	KOM	NEK	PLE	SZE	SZI	TAT	VES
Balatonfüredi KSE	—	30–30	35–24	32–30	30–27	35–36	29–24	31–27	29–24	27–21	21–35	29–25	24–29	20–32
Budai Farkasok-Rév	26–28	—	30–27	28–26	26–25	30–28	27–30	22–22	22–27	17–27	28–33	22–23	26–28	26–45
Budakalász FKC	24–25	26–26	—	23–22	29–29	32–40	26–30	29–27	27–23	33–33	32–44	24–29	30–31	32–45
Csurgói KK	27–27	31–30	34–28	—	25–20	27–22	20–23	28–31	27–27	33–25	25–25	37–19	30–34	27–35
ETO University HT	28–25	27–20	34–26	32–27	—	32–34	34–29	32–29	33–23	26–29	29–37	28–25	24–25	26–44
FTC-Green Collect	30–22	32–32	39–29	26–26	33–23	—	42–31	35–28	31–34	26–29	30–33	36–31	31–25	30–42
HE-DO B. Braun Gyöngyös	25–21	36–30	32–23	23–22	28–26	27–28	—	28–19	28–29	27–30	25–34	29–26	26–31	27–46
Carbonex-Komló	26–27	25–25	25–23	26–26	29–31	38–36	25–23	—	26–23	28–31	26–42	24–18	26–31	24–32
NEKA	34–31	29–32	31–24	30–27	25–25	21–35	24–23	27–25	—	29–24	31–36	36–31	25–31	40–51
PLER-Budapest	26–30	23–27	32–33	29–22	31–24	31–33	22–20	31–30	25–25	—	25–26	22–20	29–31	23–36
OTP Bank-Pick Szeged	39–23	39–25	41–23	30–27	42–32	37–27	42–26	37–28	42–17	44–32	—	28–21	41–32	31–32
Szigetszentmiklósi KSK	25–19	27–27	26–26	32–28	24–24	21–37	28–24	30–27	26–28	28–28	28–37	—	26–34	22–33
MOL Tatabánya KC	30–24	41–34	40–36	26–27	37–29	32–38	32–26	39–27	36–29	28–22	34–30	29–25	—	29–31
ONE Veszprém HC	47–25	33–22	43–19	41–30	47–36	43–29	36–28	41–34	38–31	42–21	30–24	49–32	39–27	—

Source: Results (Hungarian Handball Federation) (in Hungarian)
Legend: Blue = home team win; Yellow = draw; Red = away team win.
For upcoming matches, an "a" indicates there is an article about the rivalry between the two participants.

== Finals ==
Team 1	Series	Team 2	Game 1	Game 2	Game 3
ONE Veszprém HC	2–0	OTP Bank-Pick Szeged	38–36	36–34	–

=== Game 1 ===
29 May 2025; 19:00	ONE Veszprém HC	38–36	OTP Bank-Pick Szeged	Veszprém Aréna, Veszprém; Attendance: 4,850; Referees: Hargitai, Markó
29 May 2025; 19:00	Descat 14	(19–17)	Garciandia 9	Veszprém Aréna, Veszprém; Attendance: 4,850; Referees: Hargitai, Markó
29 May 2025; 19:00	1× (yellow card) 7× (suspension)	Report	1× (yellow card) 7× (suspension)	Veszprém Aréna, Veszprém; Attendance: 4,850; Referees: Hargitai, Markó

=== Game 2 ===
2 June 2025; 19:00	OTP Bank-Pick Szeged	34–36	ONE Veszprém HC	Pick Aréna, Szeged; Attendance: 6,275; Referees: László, Wiedemann
2 June 2025; 19:00	three players 6	(19–16)	Hesham 8	Pick Aréna, Szeged; Attendance: 6,275; Referees: László, Wiedemann
2 June 2025; 19:00	1× (yellow card) 2× (suspension)	Report	1× (yellow card) 1× (suspension) 1× (red card)	Pick Aréna, Szeged; Attendance: 6,275; Referees: László, Wiedemann

ONE Veszprém HC won the Finals, 2–0 on series.

2025–26 Nemzeti Bajnokság I
Champion

30th title

== Top goalscorers ==
Rank	Player	Club	Goals
1	(Hungary) István Mátés	Budakalász FKC	171
2	(Slovenia) Gregor Ocvirk	PLER-Budapest	160
3	(Bosnia and Herzegovina) Domagoj Alilović	Csurgói KK	142
4	(Slovenia) Tim Rozman	Balatonfüredi KSE	124
5	(Hungary) Hári Levente	ETO University HT	121
6	(Hungary) Benjámin Szilágyi	OTP Bank-Pick Szeged	109
7	(Croatia) Bruno Butorac	Szigetszentmiklósi KSK	108
8	(Spain) Imanol Garciandia	OTP Bank-Pick Szeged	107
9	(Slovenia) Gašper Marguč	ONE Veszprém HC	106
9	(Croatia) Ivan Martinović	ONE Veszprém HC	106
9	(Hungary) Mátyás Győri	FTC-Green Collect	106

== Awards ==
The all-star team.

Position	Player
Goalkeeper	(Hungary) Roland Mikler (OTP Bank-Pick Szeged)
Right wing	(Croatia) Mario Šoštarić (OTP Bank-Pick Szeged)
Right back	(Croatia) Ivan Martinović (ONE Veszprém)
Centre back	(Hungary) Levente Tóth (NEKA)
Left back	(Hungary) Benedek Éles (MOL Tatabánya KC)
Left wing	(France) Hugo Descat (ONE Veszprém)
Pivot	(Serbia) Dragan Pechmalbec (ONE Veszprém)
Best player	(Hungary) István Mátés (Budakalász FKC)

== See also ==
- 2025–26 Magyar Kupa
- 2025–26 Nemzeti Bajnokság I/B
- 2025–26 Nemzeti Bajnokság II
