= 2023–24 Magyar Kupa (men's handball) =

Hungarian men's handball season

Tournament details
- Country: Hungary
- Dates: 22 August 2023 – 10 March 2024
- Teams: 38

Final positions
- Champions: Telekom Veszprém; 31st title
- Runners-up: OTP Bank-Pick Szeged
- Third place: HSA NEKA
- Fourth place: Dabas KC

The 2023–24 Magyar Kupa (English: Hungarian Cup) is the 66th season of Hungary's annual knock-out cup handball competition.

Telekom Veszprém won their thirty-first title.

== Schedule ==
Times up to 28 October 2023 and from 31 March 2024 are CEST (UTC+2). Times from 29 October 2023 to 30 March 2024 are CET (UTC+1).

The rounds of the 2023–24 competition are scheduled as follows:

Round	Draw date	Matches	Fixtures	Clubs	New entries	Leagues entering
Round I	25 July 2023	29 August–27 September 2023	8	16 → 8	16	Nemzeti Bajnokság I/B, Nemzeti Bajnokság II and, Megyei Bajnokság I
Round II	3 October 2023	20 October–8 November 2023	8	16 → 8	8	Nemzeti Bajnokság I/B
Round III	11 November 2023	21 November–6 December 2023	8	16 → 8	8	Nemzeti Bajnokság I, places 7–14
Round IV	12 December 2023	12 January–7 February 2024	6	12 → 6	4	Nemzeti Bajnokság I, places 3–6
Quarter-finals	13 February 2024	6–20 March 2024	4	8 → 4	2	Nemzeti Bajnokság I, places 1–2
Final four	25 March 2024	18–19 May 2024	4	4 → 1	none	none

== Teams ==
A total of 38 teams competed in the 2023–24 edition, comprising 14 teams from the Nemzeti Bajnokság I (tier 1), 13 teams from the Nemzeti Bajnokság I/B (tier 2), 9 teams from the Nemzeti Bajnokság II (tier 3) and 1 teams from the Megyei Bajnokság I (tier 4).

=== Nemzeti Bajnokság I ===
- Balatonfüredi KSE
- CYEB-Budakalász
- Csurgói KK
- Dabas KC
- QHB-Eger
- FTC-Green Collect
- HE-DO B. Braun Gyöngyös
- Carbonex-Komló
- HSA NEKA
- PLER-Budapest
- OTP Bank-Pick Szeged
- MOL-Tatabánya KC
- Telekom Veszprém
- Fejér-B.Á.L. Veszprém

=== Nemzeti Bajnokság I/B ===
- KK Ajka
- BFKA-Veszprém
- Budai Farkasok-Rév
- Optimum Solar-Békési FKC
- Ceglédi KKSE
- DEAC
- Győri ETO-UNI FKC
- Kecskemét
- Mezőkövesdi KC
- ÓAM-Ózdi KC
- Rákosmente
- Szigetszentmiklósi KSK
- Vecsés SE

=== Nemzeti Bajnokság II ===
Northwest Group

- BFKA-Balatonfüred
- Kistext
- Várpalotai BSK

Southwest Group

- Százhalombattai KE

Northeast Group

- DVTK
- Füzesabonyi SC
- Csépe-Salgótarjáni SKC
- Váci FKA

Southeast Group

- Csömör KSK

=== Megyei Bajnokság I ===
Komárom-Esztergom and Fejér

- Martonvásári KSE

== Matches ==
A total of 32 matches took place, starting with First round on 29 August 2023 and culminating with the Final on 19 May 2024.

=== First round ===
The first round ties was scheduled for 29 August–27 September 2023.

Team 1	Score	Team 2
29 August
BFKA-Balatonfüred (3)	16–24	(2) KK Ajka
1 September
Martonvásári KSE (4)	26–39	(3) Csömör KSK
5 September
Várpalotai BSK (3)	23–37	(2) Győri ETO-UNI FKC
26 September
Százhalombattai KE (3)	25–33	(2) Ceglédi KKSE
27 September
Füzesabonyi SC (3)	25–41	(2) DEAC
DVTK (3)	26–26	(2) Mezőkövesdi KC
Csépe-Salgótarjáni SKC (3)	33–32	(2) Budai Farkasok-Rév
Váci FKA (3)	10–0	(3) Kistext

=== Second round ===
The second round ties was scheduled for 20 October–8 November 2023.

Team 1	Score	Team 2
20 October
Csömör KSK (3)	37–33	(2) BFKA-Veszprém
24 October
KK Ajka (3)	32–33	(2) Tatai AC
31 October
Ceglédi KKSE (2)	35–27	(2) DEAC
2 November
Optimum Solar-Békési FKC (2)	32–25	(2) Kecskemét
Csépe-Salgótarjáni SKC (3)	30–32	(2) Vecsés SE
Váci FKA (3)	27–29	(2) Szigetszentmiklósi KSK
3 November
Győri ETO-UNI FKC (2)	37–26	(2) Rákosmente
8 November
DVTK (3)	28–23	(2) ÓAM-Ózdi KC

=== Third round ===
The third round ties was scheduled for 21 November–6 December 2023.

Team 1	Score	Team 2
21 November
Ceglédi KKSE (2)	27–37	(1) Dabas KC
Győri ETO-UNI FKC (2)	27–29	(2) Szigetszentmiklósi KSK
28 November
DVTK (3)	32–44	(1) HE-DO B. Braun Gyöngyös
Vecsés SE (2)	25–32	(1) QHB-Eger
5 December
Optimum Solar-Békési FKC (2)	31–36	(1) PLER-Budapest
Csömör KSK (3)	26–35	(1) Fejér-B.Á.L. Veszprém
Tatai AC (2)	22–40	(1) HSA NEKA
6 November
CYEB-Budakalász (1)	32–29	(1) Carbonex-Komló

=== Fourth round ===
The fourth round ties was scheduled for 12 January–7 February 2024.

Team 1	Score	Team 2
12 January
PLER-Budapest (1)	36–31	(1) Fejér-B.Á.L. Veszprém
26 January
QHB-Eger (1)	25–30	(1) Dabas KC
27 January
Szigetszentmiklósi KSK (2)	25–40	(1) CYEB-Budakalász
30 January
FTC-Green Collect (1)	32–26	(1) HE-DO B. Braun Gyöngyös
6 February
HSA NEKA (1)	32–26	(1) Balatonfüredi KSE
7 February
Csurgói KK (1)	26–26 (a)	(1) MOL-Tatabánya KC

=== Quarter-finals ===
The Quarter finals ties was scheduled for 6–20 March 2024.

Team 1	Score	Team 2
6 March
Dabas KC (1)	35–28	(1) MOL-Tatabánya KC
20 March
CYEB-Budakalász (1)	30–36	(1) HSA NEKA
PLER-Budapest (1)	31–38	(1) OTP Bank-Pick Szeged
Telekom Veszprém (1)	37–29	(1) FTC-Green Collect

== Final four ==
The final four will be held on 18–19 May 2024 at the Tatabányai Multifunkcionális Sportcsarnok in Tatabánya.

Semi-finals
18 May, 15:30
OTP Bank-Pick Szeged	39
HSA NEKA	33
18 May, 18:00
Telekom Veszprém	38
Dabas KC	27

Final
19 May, 18:00
OTP Bank-Pick Szeged	30
Telekom Veszprém	33
Bronze medal match
19 May, 15:15
HSA NEKA	32
Dabas KC	27

=== Awards ===
- Most valuable player: (France) Ludovic Fabregas

==== Final standings ====
	Team
	Telekom Veszprém; 31st title
Silver medal	OTP Bank-Pick Szeged
Bronze medal	HSA NEKA
4th	Dabas KC

=== Semi-finals ===
18 May 2024; 15:30	OTP Bank-Pick Szeged	39–33	HSA NEKA	Tatabányai Multifunkcionális Sportcsarnok, Tatabánya; Attendance: 2,306; Referees: Sándor, Szabó
18 May 2024; 15:30	Šoštarič 8	(17–15)	Ludmán, Sztraka 5	Tatabányai Multifunkcionális Sportcsarnok, Tatabánya; Attendance: 2,306; Referees: Sándor, Szabó
18 May 2024; 15:30	2× (yellow card) 3× (suspension) 1× (red card)	Report	4× (suspension) 1× (red card)	Tatabányai Multifunkcionális Sportcsarnok, Tatabánya; Attendance: 2,306; Referees: Sándor, Szabó

18 May 2024; 18:00	Telekom Veszprém	38–27	Dabas KC	Tatabányai Multifunkcionális Sportcsarnok, Tatabánya; Attendance: 2,488; Referees: G. Kiu, T. Kiu
18 May 2024; 18:00	three players 5	(22–17)	Török, Zdolik 5	Tatabányai Multifunkcionális Sportcsarnok, Tatabánya; Attendance: 2,488; Referees: G. Kiu, T. Kiu
18 May 2024; 18:00	2× (yellow card) 3× (suspension)	Report	1× (yellow card) 3× (suspension)	Tatabányai Multifunkcionális Sportcsarnok, Tatabánya; Attendance: 2,488; Referees: G. Kiu, T. Kiu

=== Bronze medal match ===
19 May 2024; 15:15	HSA NEKA	32–27	Dabas KC	Tatabányai Multifunkcionális Sportcsarnok, Tatabánya; Attendance: 2,850; Referees: Bóna, Földesi
19 May 2024; 15:15	Dely 9	(15–13)	Török 8	Tatabányai Multifunkcionális Sportcsarnok, Tatabánya; Attendance: 2,850; Referees: Bóna, Földesi
19 May 2024; 15:15	1× (yellow card) 3× (suspension)	Report	2× (suspension)	Tatabányai Multifunkcionális Sportcsarnok, Tatabánya; Attendance: 2,850; Referees: Bóna, Földesi

=== Final ===
19 May 2024; 18:00	OTP Bank-Pick Szeged	30–33	Telekom Veszprém	Tatabányai Multifunkcionális Sportcsarnok, Tatabánya; Attendance: 4,967; Referees: Bócz, Wiedemann
19 May 2024; 18:00	Šoštarič 8	(15–16)	Yahia 6	Tatabányai Multifunkcionális Sportcsarnok, Tatabánya; Attendance: 4,967; Referees: Bócz, Wiedemann
19 May 2024; 18:00	3× (suspension)	Report	3× (suspension) 1× (red card)	Tatabányai Multifunkcionális Sportcsarnok, Tatabánya; Attendance: 4,967; Referees: Bócz, Wiedemann

== See also ==
- 2023–24 Nemzeti Bajnokság I
- 2023–24 Nemzeti Bajnokság I/B
- 2023–24 Nemzeti Bajnokság II
