= 2022–23 Ferencvárosi TC (men's handball) season =

Ferencvárosi TC
2022–23 season
- President: Zsolt Ákos Jeney
- Head coach: (Hungary) István Pásztor
- Nemzeti Bajnokság I: -
- Hungarian Cup: Pre-season
- EHF European League: Pre-season
Home colours	Away colours
- All statistics correct as of 4 September 2022.

The 2022–23 season was the 72nd season in the history of Ferencvárosi TC and their 6th consecutive season in the top flight. The club will participate in Nemzeti Bajnokság I, Magyar Kupa and the EHF European League.

== Players ==
=== Squad information ===
Squad for the 2022–23 season.
As of 4 September 2022

Goalkeepers

- 24 (Hungary) Ádám Borbély
- 67 (Hungary) Kristóf Győri

Left Wingers

- 29 (Hungary) Ádám Juhász
- 39 (Hungary) Sándor Bohács
- 99 (Hungary) Péter Kovacsics

Right Wingers

- 18 (Hungary) Bence Imre
- 94 (Hungary) Bendegúz Bujdosó

Line Players

- 2 (Hungary) Félix Turák
- 9 (Hungary) Dániel Füzi
- 22 (Hungary) Bálint Pordán (c)
- 23 (Hungary) Dávid Debreczeni

Left Backs

- 11 (Hungary) Bence Nagy
- 44 (Hungary) Viktor Prainer
- 81 (Slovakia) Jakub Mikita

Central Backs

- 7 (Hungary) Alex Bognár
- 30 (Hungary) Ádám Török
- 66 (Hungary) Máté Lékai
- 77 (Hungary) Kristóf Csörgő

Right Backs

- 17 (Hungary) Máté Ónodi-Jánoskúti
- 19 (Hungary) Zsolt Balogh

=== Transfers ===
Source: Rajt a K&H férfi ligában

IN

- (Hungary) Zsolt Balogh (from (Hungary) Tatabánya)
- (Hungary) Ádám Borbély (from (Hungary) Veszprém KKFT)
- (Hungary) Kristóf Csörgő (from (Hungary) Mezőkövesd)
- (Hungary) Máté Lékai (from (Hungary) Veszprém)
- (Hungary) Ádám Török (from (Hungary) Dabas)
- Head coach: (Hungary) István Pásztor

OUT

- (Montenegro) Božo Anđelić (to (North Macedonia) Vardar 1961)
- (Hungary) Xavér Deményi (to (Hungary) NEKA)
- (Hungary) Miklós Karai (loan to (Hungary) NEKA)
- (Hungary) Péter Kende (to (Hungary) Cegléd)
- (Hungary) Szabolcs Tóth (to (Hungary) Budakalász)
- (Hungary) Márk Vári (to (Hungary) Balatonfüred)
- (Slovakia) Marián Žernovič (to (Switzerland) TSV St. Otmar St. Gallen)
- Head coach: (Hungary) Attila Horváth

=== Staff members ===
Source: Staff - Szakmai stáb Ferencvárosi TC / 2022-2023

- Head Coach: István Pásztor
- Goalkeeping Coach: Zsolt Ocsovai
- Fitness Coach: Ábel Nagy
- Physiotherapist: Dorottya Zsemberi
- Club Doctor: Balázs Sárdy MD
- Masseur: Máté Varga

== Club ==
=== Management ===
Source: Staff - Szakmai stáb Ferencvárosi TC / 2022-2023

Position	Staff member
The club
President	(Hungary) Gábor Kubatov
Executive Vice President	(Hungary) Zoltán Nyíri
Director - General for Economic Affairs	(Hungary) Miklós Szalai
Executive director	(Hungary) Zsolt Görög
Technical manager	(Hungary) Máté Szaszkó
Member of the Board	(Hungary) Beatrix Kökény
Member of the Board	(Hungary) András Sike
Member of the Board	(Hungary) Gyula Rákosi
Member of the Board	(Hungary) Tibor Rékasi
Member of the Board	(Hungary) Dr. János Bácskai
Member of the Board	(Hungary) György Rieb
Head Of Department; Male And Youth	(Hungary) Sándor Király
Handball section
Executive director	Sándor Király
Technical director	Máté Szaszkó
Video analyst	Béla Márkus

=== Uniform ===
- Supplier: Nike
- Shirt sponsor (front): Lidl / tippmix
- Shirt sponsor (back): Pátria Nyomda / Diagnosticum Zrt.
- Shirt sponsor (sleeves): MVM
- Shorts sponsor: Lidl / MVM

== Competitions ==
Times up to 30 October 2022 and from 26 March 2023 are CEST (UTC+2). Times from 30 October 2022 to 26 March 2023 are CET (UTC+1).

Win Draw Loss

=== Overview ===
Competition	First match	Last match	Starting round	Final position	Record							
Competition	First match	Last match	Starting round	Final position	Pld	W	D	L	GF	GA	GD	Win %
Nemzeti Bajnokság I	10 September 2022	-	Matchday 2	-	2	1	0	1	63	63	+0	50.00
Magyar Kupa	-	-	Fourth round	-	0	0	0	0	0	0	+0	—
EHF European League	27 August 2022	-	First qualifying round	-	2	2	0	0	74	49	+25	100.00
Total					4	3	0	1	137	112	+25	75.00

Last updated: 11 September 2022
Source: Flashscore

=== Nemzeti Bajnokság I ===
==== Regular season ====
===== Results by round =====
Round	1	2	3	4	5	6	7	8	9	10	11	12	13	14	15	16	17	18	19	20	21	22	23	24	25	26
Ground	H	A	A	H	A	H	A	H	A	H	A	H	A	A	H	H	A	H	A	H	A	H	A	H	A	H
Result	W	L		W	L	W	W																			

Updated to match(es) played on 11 September 2022. Source: Matches
A = Away; H = Home; W = Win; D = Draw; L = Loss; C = Cancelled

===== Matches =====
The league fixtures were announced on 5 July 2022.

Round 1; 14 September 2022; 18:00	Ferencvárosi TC	33–26	Dabas KC	Elek Gyula Aréna, Budapest; Attendance: 500; Referees: Bóna, Földesi
Round 1; 14 September 2022; 18:00	Nagy 10	(16–11)	three players 6	Elek Gyula Aréna, Budapest; Attendance: 500; Referees: Bóna, Földesi
Round 1; 14 September 2022; 18:00	3× (suspension)	Report	1× (yellow card) 4× (suspension)	Elek Gyula Aréna, Budapest; Attendance: 500; Referees: Bóna, Földesi

Round 2; 10 September 2022; 14:10	MOL Tatabánya KC	37–30	Ferencvárosi TC	Multifunkcionális Sportcsarnok, Tatabánya; Attendance: 2,780; Referees: Bíró, Kiss
Round 2; 10 September 2022; 14:10	Perić 11	(15–16)	Kovacsics 6	Multifunkcionális Sportcsarnok, Tatabánya; Attendance: 2,780; Referees: Bíró, Kiss
Round 2; 10 September 2022; 14:10	1× (yellow card) 7× (suspension)	Report	1× (yellow card) 2× (suspension)	Multifunkcionális Sportcsarnok, Tatabánya; Attendance: 2,780; Referees: Bíró, Kiss

Round 3; 18 November 2022; 18:00	Telekom Veszprém	–	Ferencvárosi TC	Veszprém Aréna, Veszprém
Round 3; 18 November 2022; 18:00		(–)		Veszprém Aréna, Veszprém
Round 3; 18 November 2022; 18:00		Report		Veszprém Aréna, Veszprém

Round 4; 23 September 2022; 18:00	Ferencvárosi TC	41–28	HE-DO B. Braun Gyöngyös	Elek Gyula Aréna, Budapest; Attendance: 500; Referees: Altmár, Horváth
Round 4; 23 September 2022; 18:00	Nagy, Bujdosó 7	(22–13)	Bura 8	Elek Gyula Aréna, Budapest; Attendance: 500; Referees: Altmár, Horváth
Round 4; 23 September 2022; 18:00	1× (yellow card) 3× (suspension) 1× (red card)	Report	2× (yellow card) 2× (suspension)	Elek Gyula Aréna, Budapest; Attendance: 500; Referees: Altmár, Horváth

Round 5; 1 October 2022; 18:00	Pick Szeged	39–33	Ferencvárosi TC	Pick Aréna, Szeged; Attendance: 2,000; Referees: Sándor, Szikszay
Round 5; 1 October 2022; 18:00	Rosta 13	(20–13)	Füzi, Prainer 6	Pick Aréna, Szeged; Attendance: 2,000; Referees: Sándor, Szikszay
Round 5; 1 October 2022; 18:00	2× (yellow card) 5× (suspension)	Report	2× (yellow card) 4× (suspension)	Pick Aréna, Szeged; Attendance: 2,000; Referees: Sándor, Szikszay

Round 6; 21 October 2022; 18:00	Ferencvárosi TC	40–23	Fejér-B.Á.L. Veszprém	Elek Gyula Aréna, Budapest; Attendance: 400; Referees: Rontó, Szanyi
Round 6; 21 October 2022; 18:00	three players 5	(21–11)	three players 4	Elek Gyula Aréna, Budapest; Attendance: 400; Referees: Rontó, Szanyi
Round 6; 21 October 2022; 18:00	1× (yellow card) 5× (suspension)	Report	1× (yellow card) 4× (suspension)	Elek Gyula Aréna, Budapest; Attendance: 400; Referees: Rontó, Szanyi

Round 7; 29 October 2022; 18:00	HSA-NEKA	28–36	Ferencvárosi TC	NEKA Sportcsarnok, Balatonboglár; Attendance: 400; Referees: Felhő, Öcsi
Round 7; 29 October 2022; 18:00	Dobi 5	(12–20)	Debreczeni 6	NEKA Sportcsarnok, Balatonboglár; Attendance: 400; Referees: Felhő, Öcsi
Round 7; 29 October 2022; 18:00	1× (yellow card) 3× (suspension)	Report	2× (yellow card) 9× (suspension)	NEKA Sportcsarnok, Balatonboglár; Attendance: 400; Referees: Felhő, Öcsi

Round 8; 4 November 2022; 18:00	Ferencvárosi TC	–	Budai Farkasok-Rév Group	Elek Gyula Aréna, Budapest
Round 8; 4 November 2022; 18:00		(–)		Elek Gyula Aréna, Budapest
Round 8; 4 November 2022; 18:00		Report		Elek Gyula Aréna, Budapest

Round 9; 12 November 2022; 18:00	Csurgói KK	–	Ferencvárosi TC	Sótonyi László Sportcsarnok, Csurgó
Round 9; 12 November 2022; 18:00		(–)		Sótonyi László Sportcsarnok, Csurgó
Round 9; 12 November 2022; 18:00		Report		Sótonyi László Sportcsarnok, Csurgó

===== Results overview =====
Opposition	Home score	Away score	Double
Balatonfüredi KSE	27 May	18 Dec	-
Budai Farkasok-Rév Group	4 Nov	25 Mar	-
CYEB-Budakalász	13 May	3 Dec	-
HÉP-Cegléd	9 Dec	19 May	-
Csurgói KK	21 Apr	12 Nov	-
Dabas KK	33–26	11 Feb	-
HE-DO B. Braun Gyöngyös	41–28	4 Mar	-
Sport36-Komló	25 Nov	6 May	-
HSA-NEKA	31 Mar	28–36	-
Pick Szeged	18 Mar	39–33	-
MOL Tatabánya KC	17 Feb	37–30	-
Telekom Veszprém	25 Feb	18 Nov	-
Fejér-B.Á.L. Veszprém	40–23	15 Apr	-

=== Magyar Kupa ===
Ferencváros entered the tournament in the fourth round.

=== EHF European League ===
==== First qualifying round ====
The draw was held on 19 July 2022 in Vienna.

27 August 2022; 17:00	Minaur Baia Mare (Romania)	27–36	Ferencvárosi TC	Sala Sporturilor Lascăr Pană, Baia Mare; Attendance: 1,250; Referees: Kirkholm Madsen, Mortensen (DEN)
27 August 2022; 17:00	Mollino 6	(14–15)	Nagy, Kovacsics 7	Sala Sporturilor Lascăr Pană, Baia Mare; Attendance: 1,250; Referees: Kirkholm Madsen, Mortensen (DEN)
27 August 2022; 17:00	1× (yellow card)	Report	2× (yellow card) 4× (suspension)	Sala Sporturilor Lascăr Pană, Baia Mare; Attendance: 1,250; Referees: Kirkholm Madsen, Mortensen (DEN)

4 September 2022; 16:00	Ferencvárosi TC	38–22	(Romania) Minaur Baia Mare	Elek Gyula Aréna, Budapest; Attendance: 700; Referees: Eliasson, Palsson (ISL)
4 September 2022; 16:00	Nagy 7	(19–9)	Căbuț 6	Elek Gyula Aréna, Budapest; Attendance: 700; Referees: Eliasson, Palsson (ISL)
4 September 2022; 16:00	1× (yellow card) 4× (suspension) 1× (red card)	Report	2× (yellow card) 1× (suspension)	Elek Gyula Aréna, Budapest; Attendance: 700; Referees: Eliasson, Palsson (ISL)

Ferencvárosi TC won 74–49 on aggregate.

==== Second qualifying round ====
The draw was held on 6 September 2022 in Vienna.

27 September 2022; 18:45	Steaua București (Romania)	33–31	Ferencvárosi TC	Sala Polivalentă, Bucharest; Attendance: 1,100; Referees: Vesović, Mitrović (MNE)
27 September 2022; 18:45	Milošević, Șandru 7	(17–14)	Bujdosó 9	Sala Polivalentă, Bucharest; Attendance: 1,100; Referees: Vesović, Mitrović (MNE)
27 September 2022; 18:45	1× (yellow card) 6× (suspension) 1× (red card)	Report	1× (yellow card) 3× (suspension)	Sala Polivalentă, Bucharest; Attendance: 1,100; Referees: Vesović, Mitrović (MNE)

4 October 2022; 18:45	Ferencvárosi TC	35–31	(Romania) Steaua București	Elek Gyula Aréna, Budapest; Attendance: 1,100; Referees: R. Thiyagarajah, S. Thiyagarajah (GER)
4 October 2022; 18:45	Balogh 10	(15–17)	Milošević 9	Elek Gyula Aréna, Budapest; Attendance: 1,100; Referees: R. Thiyagarajah, S. Thiyagarajah (GER)
4 October 2022; 18:45	2× (yellow card) 4× (suspension)	Report	1× (yellow card) 5× (suspension)	Elek Gyula Aréna, Budapest; Attendance: 1,100; Referees: R. Thiyagarajah, S. Thiyagarajah (GER)

Ferencvárosi TC won 66–64 on aggregate.

==== Group stage ====
The draw was held on 6 October 2022 in Vienna, Austria.

Pos	Team	Pld	W	D	L	GF	GA	GD	Pts	Qualification	FLE	YST	VAL	FTC	PAU	BEN
1	(Germany) SG Flensburg-Handewitt	10	8	1	1	327	280	+47	17	Knockout stage	—	30–23	33–30	42–30	30–25	35–30
2	(Sweden) Ystads IF	10	5	1	4	317	316	+1	11 (Note: Ystad 65–64 Valur)	Knockout stage	30–26	—	33–35	35–35	29–33	36–30
3	(Iceland) Valur	10	5	1	4	338	328	+10	11	Knockout stage	32–37	29–32	—	43–39	40–31	35–29
4	(Hungary) FTC	10	3	3	4	318	328	−10	9	Knockout stage	27–27	37–34	33–33	—	28–25	32–33
5	(France) PAUC Handball	10	4	0	6	305	313	−8	8		21–29	34–36	32–29	33–30	—	39–29
6	(Spain) BM Benidorm	10	2	0	8	295	335	−40	4		32–38	27–29	29–32	23–27	33–32	—

Source: EHF
Rules for classification: Tiebreakers
Notes:

25 October 2022; 20:45	Valur (Iceland)	43–39	FTC	Origo-höllin, Reykjavík; Attendance: 785; Referees: Gasmi, Gasmi (FRA)
25 October 2022; 20:45	Svölu Baldursson 8	(22–15)	Lékai 9	Origo-höllin, Reykjavík; Attendance: 785; Referees: Gasmi, Gasmi (FRA)
25 October 2022; 20:45	1× (yellow card) 5× (suspension)	Report	4× (suspension)	Origo-höllin, Reykjavík; Attendance: 785; Referees: Gasmi, Gasmi (FRA)

1 November 2022; 18:45	FTC	37–34	(Sweden) Ystads IF	Riz Levente Sport- és Rendezvényközpont, Budapest; Attendance: 2,100; Referees: Mitrevski, Todorovki (MKD)
1 November 2022; 18:45	Debreczeni 8	(19–18)	Andersson 7	Riz Levente Sport- és Rendezvényközpont, Budapest; Attendance: 2,100; Referees: Mitrevski, Todorovki (MKD)
1 November 2022; 18:45	1× (yellow card) 1× (suspension)	Report	2× (suspension)	Riz Levente Sport- és Rendezvényközpont, Budapest; Attendance: 2,100; Referees: Mitrevski, Todorovki (MKD)

===== Results overview =====
Opposition	Home score	Away score	Double
(France) PAUC Handball	–	–	-
(Sweden) Ystads IF	37–34	–	-
(Iceland) Valur	–	43–39	-
(Germany) SG Flensburg-Handewitt	–	–	-
(Spain) BM Benidorm	–	–	-

== Statistics ==
=== Top scorers ===
Includes all competitive matches. The list is sorted by shirt number when total goals are equal. Last updated on 5 September 2022.

Position	Nation	No.	Name	Hungarian League	Hungarian Cup	European League	Total
1	(Hungary)	11	Bence Nagy	5	0	14	19
2	(Hungary)	99	Péter Kovacsics	6	0	9	15
3	(Hungary)	94	Bujdosó Bendegúz	3	0	7	10
4	(Hungary)	23	Dávid Debreczeni	4	0	4	8
5	(Hungary)	18	Bence Imre	1	0	6	7
6	(Hungary)	17	Máté Ónodi-Jánoskúti	0	0	7	7
7	(Hungary)	9	Dániel Füzi	4	0	3	7
8	(Hungary)	66	Máté Lékai	3	0	3	6
9	(Hungary)	7	Alex Bognár	0	0	6	6
10	(Hungary)	44	Viktor Prainer	2	0	3	5
11	(Hungary)	19	Zsolt Balogh	0	0	5	5
12	(Slovakia)	81	Jakub Mikita	1	0	3	4
13	(Hungary)	22	Bálint Pordán	0	0	3	3
14	(Hungary)	7	Alex Bognár	1	0	0	1
15	(Hungary)	77	Kristóf Csörgő	0	0	1	1
			TOTALS	30	0	74	104
