= Terzić =

Terzić (Serbian: Терзић) is a Bosnian and Serbian surname, derived from the word terzija, meaning "tailor". Notable people with the surname include:

- Admir Terzić (born 1992), Bosnian footballer
- Adnan Terzić (born 1960), Bosnia and Herzegovina politician
- Aleksa Terzić (born 1999), Serbian footballer
- Amela Terzić (born 1993), Serbian middle-distance runner
- Arvedin Terzić (born 1989), Bosnian footballer
- Borislav Terzić (born 1991), Serbian footballer
- Dara Terzić Šterić (born 1970), Serbian rhythmic gymnast
- Dejan Terzić (born 1987), Serbian sprint canoeist
- Edin Terzić (born 1969), Yugoslav alpine skier
- Edin Terzić (born 1982), German-Croatian football coach
- Jovana Terzić (born 1999), Montenegrin swimmer
- Miloš Terzić (volleyball) (born 1987), Serbian volleyball player
- Miloš Terzić (born 1988), Serbian politician
- Mirsad Terzić (born 1983), Bosnian handball player
- Nikola Terzić (born 2000), Serbian footballer
- Petar Terzić (1739–1806), Austrian nobleman and major general
- Stefan Terzić (born 1994), Serbian handball player
- Velimir Terzić (1908–1983), Yugoslav People's Army captain, partisan general, and historian
- Zoran Terzić (born 1966), Serbian volleyball player
- Zvezdan Terzić (born 1966), Serbian footballer
