= Ádám Borbély =

Hungarian handball player (born 1995)

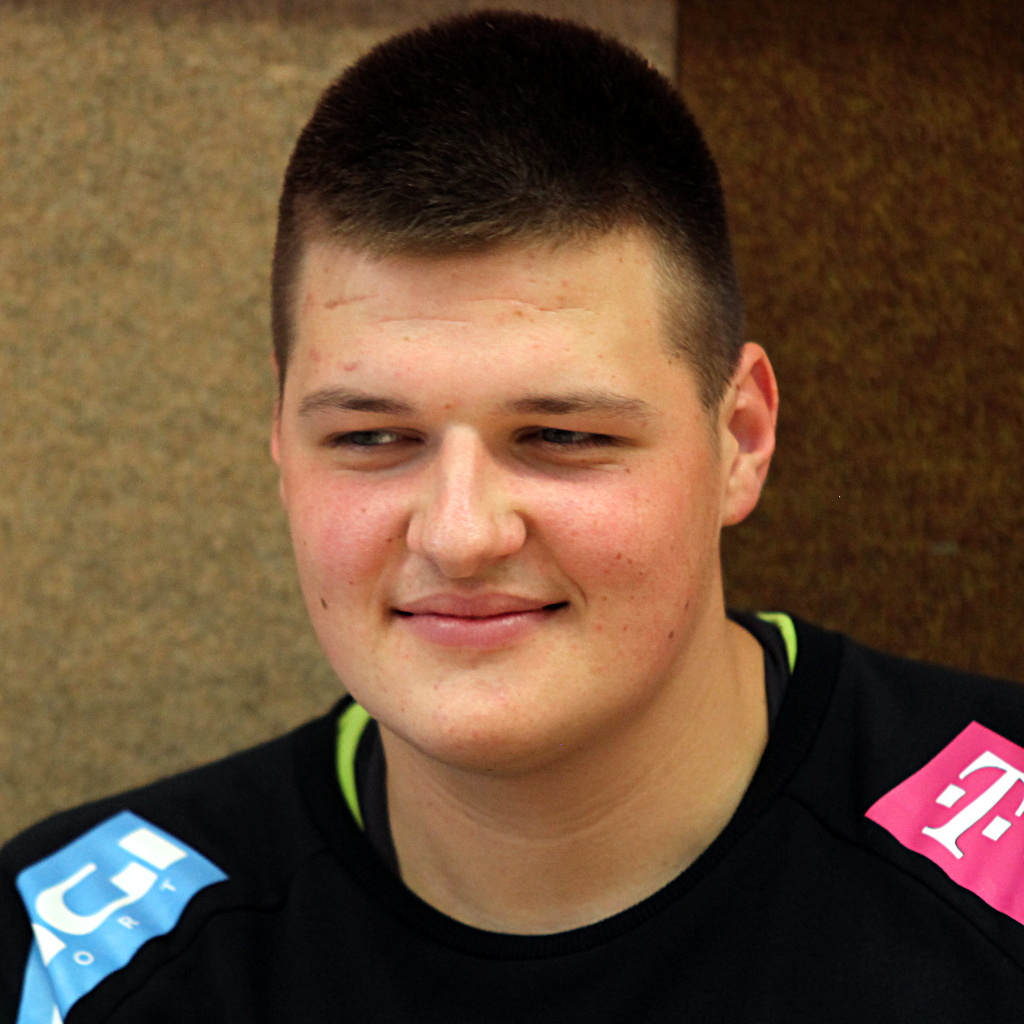

Personal information
- Nationality: Hungarian
- Born: 22 June 1995 (age 31) Debrecen, Hungary
- Height: 1.97 m (6 ft 6 in)

Sport
- Sport: Handball
- Position: Goalkeeper
- Current club: Ferencvárosi TC
- Number: 24

Youth career
- Years: Team
- 2008–2009: Tiszavasvári SE
- 2009–2010: Csanádi KSI SE
- 2010–2011: PLER KC

Senior clubs
- Years: Team
- 2011–2017: Telekom Veszprém
- 2014–2015: → Balatonfüredi KSE (loan)
- 2015–2016: → Tatabánya KC (loan)
- 2017–2019: Wisła Płock
- 2019–2020: Tatabánya KC
- 2020–2022: Veszprém KKFT Felsőörs
- 2022–2026: Ferencvárosi TC
- 2026–: Győri ETO-UNI FKC
National team
Years	Team	Apps	(Gls)
2016–	Hungary	13	(0)

Ádám Borbély (born 22 June 1995) is a Hungarian handball player who plays for Ferencvárosi TC and the Hungarian national team

== Career ==
=== Club ===
Ádám Borbély moved to MKB Veszprém at a young age, but before that he also turned to the PLER KC youth team. In the first team of MKB-MVM Veszprém, he first played a more important role in the championship final in May 2014, when he was re-ordered from the loan game in Balatonfüred due to the injury of Nándor Fazekas. He entered the first meeting of the two-match final in the Bakony team, which finally celebrated the championship title. He spent the 2015–2016 season as a goalkeeper in Grundfos Tatabánya KC. In 2017, he was contracted to Wisła Płock in Poland for two years due to the continuous playing opportunity. He was also able to appear in the EHF Champions League with the Polish team, being one of the best on his team several times. From the summer of 2019 he became a player of Grundfos Tatabánya KC again. After a season, he continued his career in the leading rookie team of Veszprém KKFT Felsőörs.

=== National team ===
He was 10th with the Hungarian team at the 2013 World Youth Championship and 9th at the 2014 Junior European Championship. In the autumn of 2017, Ljubomir Vranjes invited him for the first time to the Hungarian national team. As a member of the Hungarian national team, he participated in the 2018 European Championships (14th place, 3 matches / 0 goals), the 2021 World Championship.

== Honours ==
=== Club ===
Telekom Veszprém

- Nemzeti Bajnokság I
  - Gold: 2013, 2014, 2017
- Magyar Kupa
  - Gold: 2013, 2014, 2017

Grundfos Tatabánya KC

- Nemzeti Bajnokság I
  - Bronze: 2016

Wisła Płock

- Superliga
  - Silver: 2018, 2019
- Polish Cup
  - Silver: 2018, 2019

Veszprém KKFT Felsőörs

- Magyar Kupa
  - Silver: 2022

Ferencvárosi TC

- Nemzeti Bajnokság I
  - Bronze: 2025
