= Miloš Terzić =

Miloš Terzić may refer to:

- Miloš Terzić (volleyball)
- Miloš Terzić (politician)
