= Péter Kovacsics =

Hungarian handball player (born 1994)

Personal information
- Nationality: Hungarian
- Born: 13 June 1994 (age 32) Nagyatád, Hungary
- Height: 1.90 m (6 ft 3 in)

Sport
- Sport: Handball
- Position: Left wing
- Current club: Ferencvárosi TC
- Number: 99

Youth career
- Years: Team
- 2006–2012: Csurgói KK

Senior clubs
- Years: Team
- 2012–2015: (Hungary) Csurgói KK
- 2014–2015: → (Hungary) Balatonfüredi KSE (loan)
- 2015–2018: (Hungary) Gyöngyösi KK
- 2018–: (Hungary) Ferencvárosi TC
National team
Years	Team	Apps	(Gls)
2020–	Hungary	7	(8)

Péter Kovacsics (born 13 June 1994) is a Hungarian handball player who plays for Ferencvárosi TC and the Hungary national team.

== Career ==
=== Club ===
Péter spent his junior years at Csurgói KK, where he also made his debut in Nemzeti Bajnokság I in the 2012/13 season. He scored 27 goals in 16 games. In the 2014/15 season, he played on loan at Balatonfüredi KSE, replacing Bendegúz Bóka, who was recovering from leg surgery. He scored 46 goals in 26 games. Here he made his debut in the EHF Cup, where he scored 5 goals. In 2015, he moved to Gyöngyösi KK. He transferred to Ferencvárosi TC in the summer of 2018. In the 2022/23 season, he reached fourth place in the league and reached the EHF European League round of 16 with the team. He scored 35 goals in 15 matches in the EHF European League.

=== National team ===
He was 10th with the Hungarian team at the 2013 World Youth Championship and 9th at the 2014 Junior European Championship. He made his debut in the Hungary men's national handball team on November 4, 2020, in the Eurocup match against the Spain men's national handball team: Hungary-Spain 32–29. (Péter did not score in the match). He was included in the large squad of the 2021 World Men's Handball Championship, but in the end he will not become a member of the narrow squad. He was also a member of the 2022 European Men's Handball Championship squad, but in the end he will not become a member of the narrow squad. He was a member of the traveling squad for the 2023 World Men's Handball Championship for the first time in a world tournament, but he did not play in a single match at the World Championship. He was included in the large squad of the 2024 European Men's Handball Championship, but in the end he will not become a member of the narrow squad. He was included in the large squad of the 2025 World Men's Handball Championship, but in the end he will not become a member of the narrow squad.

== Personal life ==
He has an older brother, Ferenc, he is also a professional handball player, playing on the same position, left wing. His older sister, Anikó Kovacsics also used to play handball representing Hungary on various international tournaments before her retirement was announced in 2024.

== Honours ==
=== Club ===
Csurgói KK

- Nemzeti Bajnokság I
  - Bronze: 2013
- Magyar Kupa
  - Bronze: 2013

Ferencvárosi TC

- Nemzeti Bajnokság I
  - Bronze: 2025
