= Bendegúz Bujdosó =

Hungarian handball player (born 1994)

Personal information
- Nationality: Hungarian
- Born: 10 December 1994 (age 31) Székesfehérvár, Hungary
- Height: 1.81 m (5 ft 11 in)

Sport
- Sport: Handball
- Position: Right wing
- Current club: Ferencvárosi TC
- Number: 94

Youth career
- Years: Team
- 2007–2009: Balatonboglári SC
- 2009–2014: MKB Veszprém

Senior clubs
- Years: Team
- 2014–2015: (Hungary) Dabasi KC VSE
- 2015–2016: (Hungary) PLER-Budapest
- 2016–: (Hungary) Ferencvárosi TC
National team
| Years | Team | Apps | (Gls) |
| 2020– | Hungary | 18 | (11) |

Bendegúz Bujdosó (born 10 December 1994) is a Hungarian handball player who plays for Ferencvárosi TC and the Hungary national team.

== Career ==
=== Club ===
Bendegúz started his career at Balatonboglári SC. After that, he spent 5 years in the MKB Veszprém youth teams. In 2014, he transferred to the Nemzeti Bajnokság I/B Dabasi KC VSE. Here in the second division he scored 37 goals in 26 games. In 2015, he passed the first-class PLER-Budapest. Although the team was eliminated from Nemzeti Bajnokság I, Bendegúz performed well, scoring 71 goals in 34 championships. In the summer of 2016, he transferred to Ferencvárosi TC. He spent one season in the Nemzeti Bajnokság I/B with the team, but since 2017 he has been continuously playing in the Nemzeti Bajnokság I with Ferencvárosi TC. In the 2022/23 season, he reached fourth place in the league and reached the EHF European League round of 16 with the team. He scored 45 goals in 15 matches in the EHF European League.

=== National team ===
He was 10th with the Hungarian team at the 2013 World Youth Championship. He made his debut in the Hungary men's national handball team on November 4, 2020, in the Eurocup match against the Spain men's national handball team: Hungary-Spain 32–29 (scored 2 goals). He was included in the large squad of the 2021 World Men's Handball Championship, but in the end he will not become a member of the narrow squad. He was also a member of the 2022 European Men's Handball Championship squad, but he did not play in a single match at the European Championship. He also participated in the 2023 World Men's Handball Championship as a member of the Hungary men's national handball team. (8th place, 3 games / 3 goals). He was included in the large squad of the 2024 European Men's Handball Championship, but in the end he will not become a member of the narrow squad.

== Personal life ==
Married, his wife, Fanni Gerháth, is a Hungarian handball player. Their daughter, Zaina Szófia, was born in 2022.

== Honours ==
=== Club ===
Ferencvárosi TC

- Nemzeti Bajnokság I
  - Bronze: 2025
- Nemzeti Bajnokság I/B
  - Gold: 2017
