= Mirsad Terzić =

Bosnian handball player

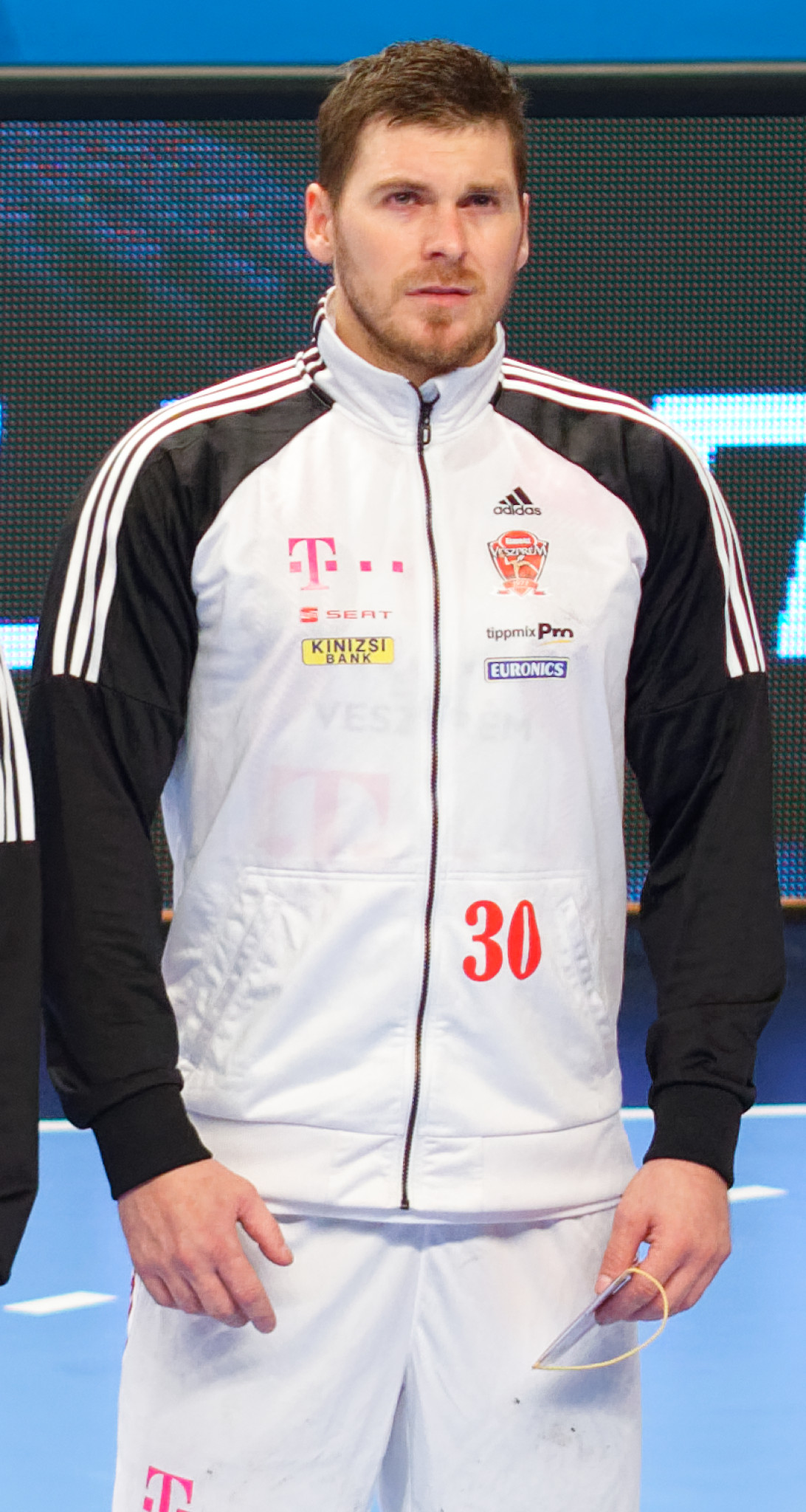

Personal information
- Nationality: Bosnian
- Born: 12 July 1983 (age 43) Priboj, SFR Yugoslavia
- Height: 1.96 m (6 ft 5 in)

Sport
- Sport: Handball
- Position: Centre back
- Current club: Wisła Płock
- Number: 30

Senior clubs
- Years: Team
- 1999–2002: RK Željezničar
- 2002–2005: HRK Izviđač
- 2005–2007: RK Zagreb
- 2007–2009: RK Celje
- 2009–2020: Telekom Veszprém
- 2020–: Wisła Płock
National team
Years	Team	Apps	(Gls)
2001–2024	Bosnia and Herzegovina	171	(472)

Mirsad Terzić (born 12 July 1983) is a Bosnian handball player for Wisła Płock.

He is a left-back, but primarily known as a defender. While with Izviđač though, he scored 50 goals in only six games of the 2004–05 EHF Champions League season. Which made him the number three top scorer during the group stage. Terzić is also the most capped international and the all-time top scorer for the Bosnia and Herzegovina national team.

== Honours ==
Izviđač

- Handball Championship of Bosnia and Herzegovina: 2003–04, 2004–05

Veszprém

- Nemzeti Bajnokság I: 2009–10, 2010–11, 2011–12, 2012–13, 2013–14, 2014–15, 2015–16, 2016–17, 2018–19
- Magyar Kupa: 2009–10, 2010–11, 2011–12, 2012–13, 2013–14, 2014–15, 2015–16, 2016–17, 2017–18
- EHF Champions League runner-up: 2014–15, 2015–16, 2018–19
- SEHA League: 2014–15, 2015–16

Wisła Płock

- Polish Cup: 2021–22, 2022–23
