= Bence Nagy =

Hungarian handballer (born 1995)

Personal information
- Nationality: Hungarian
- Born: 5 July 1995 (age 31) Budapest, Hungary
- Height: 1.96 m (6 ft 5 in)

Sport
- Sport: Handball
- Position: Left back
- Current club: Ferencvárosi TC
- Number: 11

Senior clubs
- Years: Team
- 2013–2014: PLER KC
- 2014–2016: Gyöngyösi KK
- 2016–2018: Budakalász FKC
- 2018–2019: Grundfos Tatabánya KC
- 2019–: Ferencvárosi TC
National team
Years	Team	Apps	(Gls)
2019–	Hungary	19	(26)

Bence Nagy (born 5 July 1995) is a Hungarian handball player for Ferencvárosi TC and the Hungarian national team.

== Honours ==
=== Club ===
Grundfos Tatabánya KC

- Nemzeti Bajnokság I
  - Bronze: 2019

Ferencvárosi TC

- Nemzeti Bajnokság I
  - Bronze: 2025

=== Individual ===
- Nemzeti Bajnokság I Top Scorer: 2016, 2022, 2024
