= Miklós Karai =

Hungarian handball player (born 2002)

Personal information
- Nationality: Hungarian
- Born: 22 September 2002 (age 24) Budapest, Hungary
- Height: 1.95 m (6 ft 5 in)

Sport
- Sport: Handball
- Position: Pivot
- Current club: MOL Tatabánya KC
- Number: 34

Youth career
- Years: Team
- 2013–2020: Ferencvárosi TC

Senior clubs
- Years: Team
- 2020–2026: (Hungary) Ferencvárosi TC
- 2020–2021: → (Hungary) Kecskeméti TE (loan)
- 2021–2023: → (Hungary) NEKA (loan)
- 2026–: (Hungary) MOL Tatabánya KC
National team
Years	Team	Apps	(Gls)
2026–	Hungary	2	(1)
Medal record
Junior World Championship
Silver medal – second place	2023 Germany/Greece

Miklós Karai (born 6 September 2002) is a Hungarian handball player who plays for MOL Tatabánya KC and the Hungarian national team.

== Career ==
=== Club ===
In December 2013, he came to Ferencvárosi TC's youth team, went through the ranks of the age group teams, and played for the first time in the 2020/21 season in an adult Nemzeti Bajnokság I match. He scored 7 goals in 18 games. He spent the next three seasons on loan, the first in Kecskeméti TE and the other two in the NEKA team. He returned to the Ferencvárosi TC team in the summer of 2024. At the end of the 2024/25 season, he won bronze with Ferencvárosi TC. He played in the EHF European League in both the 2024/25 and 2025/26 seasons. In the summer of 2026, the top Hungarian team MOL Tatabánya KC announced his signing.

=== National team ===
He was 9th with the Hungarian team at the 2021 Youth European Championship. As a member of the junior national team, he participated in the 2022 Junior European Championship where the Hungarian team became the 5th. He participated in the 2023 Junior World Championship, where Hungary won the silver medal. The captain of the Hungarian national team, Chema Rodríguez, also noticed his performance, who invited him to practice with the national team from September 30 to October 4, 2024. The captain of the Hungarian national team, Chema Rodríguez, also noticed his performance, who invited him to practice with the national team from December 12 to December 17, 2025. He was included in the large squad of the 2026 European Men's Handball Championship, but in the end he will not become a member of the narrow squad. On 5 November 2026, he made his debut in the senior national team in Tatabánya in the Hungary-Montenegro men's European qualifying match 32-21.

== Honours ==
=== National team ===
- Junior World Championship:
  - Silver: 2023

=== Club ===
Ferencvárosi TC

- Nemzeti Bajnokság I:
  - Bronze: 2025
