= Máté Ónodi-Jánoskúti =

Hungarian handball player (born 2002)

Personal information
- Nationality: Hungarian
- Born: 17 June 2002 (age 24) Budapest, Hungary
- Height: 1.93 m (6 ft 4 in)

Sport
- Sport: Handball
- Position: Right back
- Current club: USAM Nîmes Gard
- Number: 17

Youth career
- Years: Team
- 2009–2012: Csanádi KSI SE
- 2012–2019: Ferencvárosi TC

Senior clubs
- Years: Team
- 2019–2025: (Hungary) Ferencvárosi TC
- 2025–: (France) USAM Nîmes Gard
National team
Years	Team	Apps	(Gls)
2023–	Hungary	26	(50)
Medal record
Junior World Championship
Silver medal – second place	2023 Germany/Greece

Máté Ónodi-Jánoskúti (born 17 June 2002) is a Hungarian handball player who plays for USAM Nîmes Gard and the Hungary national team.

== Career ==
=== Club ===
Máté started his career at Csanádi KSI SE. In January 2012, he came to Ferencvárosi TC's youth team, went through the ranks of the age group teams, and played for the first time in the 2018/19 season in an adult Nemzeti Bajnokság I match. He scored 5 goals in 9 games. In the 2021/22 season, he scored 85 goals in the Nemzeti Bajnokság I, making him the third most successful player of Ferencvárosi TC at the age of 19. In the 2022/23 season, he reached fourth place in the league and reached the EHF European League round of 16 with the team. He scored 33 goals in 11 matches in the EHF European League. He was signed by French side USAM Nîmes Gard in the summer of 2025.

=== National team ===
He was 9th with the Hungarian team at the 2021 Youth European Championship. As a member of the junior national team, he participated in the 2022 Junior European Championship where the Hungarian team became the 5th. He was included in the large squad of the 2023 World Men's Handball Championship, but in the end he will not become a member of the narrow squad. At the age of 20, on April 27, 2023, he made his debut in the senior national team in Klaipėda in the Lithuania-Hungary men's European qualifying match 31-46 (he scored 2 goals). He participated in the 2023 Junior World Championship, where Hungary won the silver medal. He was included in the large squad of the 2024 European Men's Handball Championship, but in the end he will not become a member of the narrow squad. He also participated in the 2025 World Men's Handball Championship as a member of the Hungary men's national handball team. (8th place, 4 matches / 8 goals). He also participated in the 2026 European Men's Handball Championship as a member of the Hungary men's national handball team. (10th place, 5 games / 10 goals).

== Honours ==
=== National team ===
- Junior World Championship:
  - Silver: 2023

=== Club ===
Ferencvárosi TC

- Nemzeti Bajnokság I
  - Bronze: 2025
