= 2010–11 Nemzeti Bajnokság I (men's handball) =

Nemzeti Bajnokság I
- Season: 2010–11
- Country: Hungary
- Champions: MKB Veszprém
- Champions League: MKB Veszprém; Pick Szeged
- EHF Cup: Tatabánya KC; Balatonfüredi KSE
- Cup Winners' Cup: Ferencvárosi TC

2010–11 Nemzeti Bajnokság I (men's handball) season.

== Team information ==
Location of teams in the 2010–11 Nemzeti Bajnokság I

Team	Location	Arena	Capacity
Balatonfüredi KSE	Balatonfüred	Balaton Szabadidő és Konferencia Központ	712
Csurgói KK	Csurgó	Városi Sportcsarnok	800
Dunaferr SE	Dunaújváros	Dunaferr Sportcsarnok	1,200
Ferencvárosi TC	Budapest	Főtáv FTC Kézilabda Aréna	1,300
Kecskemét SE	Kecskemét	Messzi István Sportcsarnok	1,200
Mezőkövesdi KC	Mezőkövesd	Városi Sportcsarnok	800
Orosházi FKSE	Orosháza	Városi Sportcsarnok	600
Pécsi VSE	Pécs	Lauber Dezső Sportcsarnok	3,000
PLER KC	Budapest	Pestszentimrei Sportkastély	1,000
Pick Szeged	Szeged	Városi Sportcsarnok	3,200
Tatabánya KC	Tatabánya	Földi Imre Sportcsarnok	1,000
Tatran Prešov	(Slovakia) Prešov	City Hall	4,000
MKB Veszprém	Veszprém	Veszprém Aréna	5,096

== Regular season ==
=== Standings ===
	Team	Pld	W	D	L	GF	GA	Diff	Pts
1	MKB Veszprém	24	24	0	0	924	628	+296	48
2	Pick Szeged	24	20	1	3	779	623	+156	41
3	(Slovakia) Tatran Prešov	24	18	1	5	838	716	+122	37
4	Ferencvárosi TC	24	15	0	9	682	630	+52	30
5	Tatabánya KC	24	13	1	10	698	610	+88	27
6	Balatonfüredi KSE	24	11	1	12	646	621	+25	23
7	Csurgói KK	24	10	1	13	674	664	+10	21
8	Kecskemét SE	24	7	4	13	684	760	−76	18
9	PLER KC	24	8	2	14	692	807	−115	15
10	Mezőkövesdi KC	24	5	1	18	598	713	−113	11
11	Pécsi VSE	24	4	1	19	645	793	−148	9
12	Orosházi FKSE	24	3	1	20	630	774	−144	7
13	Dunaferr SE	24	3	0	21	633	784	−151	6

Champion Playoff
5 to 8 Playoff
Relegation Round

Pld - Played; W - Won; L - Lost; PF - Points for; PA - Points against; Diff - Difference; Pts - Points.

=== Results ===
In the table below the home teams are listed on the left and the away teams along the top.

== Champion play-off ==
=== Semifinals ===
Team 1	Score	Team 2
MKB Veszprém	2 – 0	Tatabánya KC

20 April 2011; 18:00	MKB Veszprém	33 – 17	Tatabánya KC	Veszprém Aréna, Veszprém; Attendance: 2,000; Referees: Baranyi, Szloska
20 April 2011; 18:00	Iváncsik, Terzić 5	(17–10)	Harsányi 7	Veszprém Aréna, Veszprém; Attendance: 2,000; Referees: Baranyi, Szloska
20 April 2011; 18:00	3× (yellow card) 2× (suspension)	Report	3× (yellow card) 3× (suspension)	Veszprém Aréna, Veszprém; Attendance: 2,000; Referees: Baranyi, Szloska

22 April 2011; 18:00	Tatabánya KC	20 – 23	MKB Veszprém	Földi Imre Sportcsarnok, Tatabánya; Attendance: 800; Referees: Nagy, Túróczy
22 April 2011; 18:00	Kekezović 5	(11–11)	Pérez 5	Földi Imre Sportcsarnok, Tatabánya; Attendance: 800; Referees: Nagy, Túróczy
22 April 2011; 18:00	3× (yellow card) 4× (suspension)	Report	3× (yellow card) 3× (suspension)	Földi Imre Sportcsarnok, Tatabánya; Attendance: 800; Referees: Nagy, Túróczy

Team 1	Score	Team 2
Pick Szeged	2 – 0	Ferencvárosi TC

20 April 2011; 20:15	Pick Szeged	35 – 25	Ferencvárosi TC	Városi Sportcsarnok, Szeged; Attendance: 2,000; Referees: Kékes, Kékes
20 April 2011; 20:15	Törő 10	(17–13)	Kos 5	Városi Sportcsarnok, Szeged; Attendance: 2,000; Referees: Kékes, Kékes
20 April 2011; 20:15	3× (yellow card) 6× (suspension)	Report	3× (yellow card) 5× (suspension)	Városi Sportcsarnok, Szeged; Attendance: 2,000; Referees: Kékes, Kékes

24 April 2011; 20:15	Ferencvárosi TC	27 – 28	Pick Szeged	Főtáv FTC Kézilabda Aréna, Budapest; Attendance: 600; Referees: Andorka, Hucker
24 April 2011; 20:15	Kos 6	(15–11)	Šulc 11	Főtáv FTC Kézilabda Aréna, Budapest; Attendance: 600; Referees: Andorka, Hucker
24 April 2011; 20:15	2× (yellow card) 1× (suspension) 2× (red card)	Report	2× (yellow card) 6× (suspension)	Főtáv FTC Kézilabda Aréna, Budapest; Attendance: 600; Referees: Andorka, Hucker

=== 3rd Place ===
Team 1	Score	Team 2
Ferencvárosi TC	3 – 2	Tatabánya KC

7 May 2011; 19:00	Ferencvárosi TC	27 – 24	Tatabánya KC	Főtáv FTC Kézilabda Aréna, Budapest; Attendance: 400; Referees: Horváth, Márton
7 May 2011; 19:00	Kos 8	(13–10)	Harsányi 14	Főtáv FTC Kézilabda Aréna, Budapest; Attendance: 400; Referees: Horváth, Márton
7 May 2011; 19:00	3× (yellow card) 9× (suspension)	Report	2× (yellow card) 6× (suspension)	Főtáv FTC Kézilabda Aréna, Budapest; Attendance: 400; Referees: Horváth, Márton

13 May 2011; 18:00	Tatabánya KC	29 – 26	Ferencvárosi TC	Földi Imre Sportcsarnok, Tatabánya; Attendance: 1,000; Referees: Dobrovits, Tájok
13 May 2011; 18:00	Kekezović 6	(12–10)	Kelečević 10	Földi Imre Sportcsarnok, Tatabánya; Attendance: 1,000; Referees: Dobrovits, Tájok
13 May 2011; 18:00	2× (yellow card) 6× (suspension)	Report	1× (yellow card) 5× (suspension)	Földi Imre Sportcsarnok, Tatabánya; Attendance: 1,000; Referees: Dobrovits, Tájok

20 May 2011; 18:00	Ferencvárosi TC	26 – 23	Tatabánya KC	Főtáv FTC Kézilabda Aréna, Budapest; Attendance: 1,000; Referees: Nagy, Túróczy
20 May 2011; 18:00	Kelečević 6	(13–12)	Lele 8	Főtáv FTC Kézilabda Aréna, Budapest; Attendance: 1,000; Referees: Nagy, Túróczy
20 May 2011; 18:00	3× (yellow card) 5× (suspension)	Report	2× (yellow card) 7× (suspension)	Főtáv FTC Kézilabda Aréna, Budapest; Attendance: 1,000; Referees: Nagy, Túróczy

25 May 2011; 18:00	Tatabánya KC	29 – 24	Ferencvárosi TC	Földi Imre Sportcsarnok, Tatabánya; Attendance: 1,000; Referees: Horváth, Márton
25 May 2011; 18:00	Díaz, Lele 6	(16–11)	three players 4	Földi Imre Sportcsarnok, Tatabánya; Attendance: 1,000; Referees: Horváth, Márton
25 May 2011; 18:00	4× (yellow card) 5× (suspension)	Report	3× (yellow card) 4× (suspension)	Földi Imre Sportcsarnok, Tatabánya; Attendance: 1,000; Referees: Horváth, Márton

29 May 2011; 18:00	Ferencvárosi TC	23 – 22	Tatabánya KC	Főtáv FTC Kézilabda Aréna, Budapest; Attendance: 1,000; Referees: Baranyi, Szloska
29 May 2011; 18:00	Kelečević 7	(13–11)	Lele 6	Főtáv FTC Kézilabda Aréna, Budapest; Attendance: 1,000; Referees: Baranyi, Szloska
29 May 2011; 18:00	3× (yellow card) 8× (suspension) 1× (red card)	Report	3× (yellow card) 9× (suspension)	Főtáv FTC Kézilabda Aréna, Budapest; Attendance: 1,000; Referees: Baranyi, Szloska

=== Finals ===
Team 1	Score	Team 2
MKB Veszprém	3 – 0	Pick Szeged

3 May 2011; 18:00	MKB Veszprém	33 – 26	Pick Szeged	Veszprém Aréna, Veszprém; Attendance: 4,000; Referees: Herczeg, Südi
3 May 2011; 18:00	Terzić 9	(21–12)	Šulc 7	Veszprém Aréna, Veszprém; Attendance: 4,000; Referees: Herczeg, Südi
3 May 2011; 18:00	1× (yellow card) 4× (suspension)	Report	3× (yellow card) 1× (red card)	Veszprém Aréna, Veszprém; Attendance: 4,000; Referees: Herczeg, Südi

8 May 2011; 11:35	Pick Szeged	20 – 33	MKB Veszprém	Városi Sportcsarnok, Szeged; Attendance: 3,000; Referees: Dobrovits, Tájok
8 May 2011; 11:35	Törő 5	(9–15)	Iváncsik, Vujin 7	Városi Sportcsarnok, Szeged; Attendance: 3,000; Referees: Dobrovits, Tájok
8 May 2011; 11:35	3× (yellow card) 1× (suspension)	Report	2× (yellow card) 6× (suspension)	Városi Sportcsarnok, Szeged; Attendance: 3,000; Referees: Dobrovits, Tájok

22 May 2011; 11:35	MKB Veszprém	22 – 20	Pick Szeged	Veszprém Aréna, Veszprém; Attendance: 5,000; Referees: Dobrovits, Tájok
22 May 2011; 11:35	Vujin 5	(11–12)	Butenko, Straňovský 6	Veszprém Aréna, Veszprém; Attendance: 5,000; Referees: Dobrovits, Tájok
22 May 2011; 11:35	1× (yellow card) 3× (suspension) 1× (red card)	Report	1× (yellow card) 5× (suspension)	Veszprém Aréna, Veszprém; Attendance: 5,000; Referees: Dobrovits, Tájok

=== Final standings ===
	Team	Pld	W	D	L	GF	GA	Diff	Pts	Qualification
1	MKB Veszprém	5	5	0	0	181	136	+45	10	2011–12 EHF Champions League group stage
2	Pick Szeged	5	2	0	3	129	140	−11	4	2011–12 EHF Champions League group stage
3	Ferencvárosi TC	7	3	0	4	178	190	−12	6	2011–12 EHF Cup Winners' Cup round 2
4	Tatabánya KC	7	2	0	5	164	182	−18	4	2011–12 EHF Cup round 2

Pld - Played; W - Won; L - Lost; PF - Points for; PA - Points against; Diff - Difference; Pts - Points.

== 5 to 8 play-off ==
=== Final standings ===
	Team	Pld	W	D	L	GF	GA	Diff	Pts	Qualification
5	Csurgói KK	6	4	1	1	180	171	+9	9	
6	Balatonfüredi KSE	6	4	0	2	162	142	+20	8	2011–12 EHF Cup round 2
7	Kecskemét SE	6	3	1	2	167	168	−1	7	
8	PLER KC	6	0	0	6	159	187	−28	0	

Pld - Played; W - Won; L - Lost; PF - Points for; PA - Points against; Diff - Difference; Pts - Points.

== Relegation Round ==
=== Final standings ===
	Team	Pld	W	D	L	GF	GA	Diff	Pts	Relegation
9	Pécsi VSE	6	4	0	2	177	177	0	8	
10	Orosházi FKSE	6	3	0	3	154	151	+3	6	
11	Mezőkövesdi KC	6	3	0	3	156	153	+3	6	
12	Dunaferr SE	6	2	0	4	153	169	−6	4	Relegation to the 2011–12 Nemzeti Bajnokság I/B

Pld - Played; W - Won; L - Lost; PF - Points for; PA - Points against; Diff - Difference; Pts - Points.
