= 2016–17 Nemzeti Bajnokság I/B (men's handball) =

NB I/B férfi felnőtt
- Season: 2016–17
- Promoted: Ferencvárosi TC (East); Dabas VSE KC (West)
- Relegated: Bgy. Kábel SE (East); Tiszavasvári SE; VKK Nyírbátor; NEKA (West); Alba-MÁV-Előre; Pénzügyőr SE

The 2016–17 Nemzeti Bajnokság I/B is the 49th season of the Nemzeti Bajnokság I/B, Hungary's second tier Handball league.

== Team information ==
Location of teams in 2016-17 Nemzeti Bajnokság I/B (West)
Location of teams in 2016-17 Nemzeti Bajnokság I/B (East)

=== Western Group ===
The following 14 clubs compete in the NB I/B (Western) during the 2016–17 season:

Team	Location	Arena
Alba-MÁV-Előre	Székesfehérvár	Videoton Oktatási Központ
Balatonfüredi KSE (U23)	Balatonfüred	Észak-Balatoni Konf. Központ
Csurgói KK (U23)	Csurgó	Sótonyi László Sportcsarnok
Dabas VSE KC	Dabas	OBO Aréna
ETO - SZESE Győr FKC	Győr	Egyetemi Csarnok
NEKA	Balatonboglár	Urányi János Sportcsarnok
Pécsi VSE	Pécs	Lauber Dezső Sportcsarnok
Pénzügyőr SE	Budapest, X. ker	Pénzügyőr Sportcsarnok
PLER-Budapest	Budapest, XVIII. ker	Lőrinci Sportcsarnok
Százhalombattai KE	Százhalombatta	Városi Szabadidő Központ
Tatai AC	Tata	Güntner Aréna
Vecsés SE	Vecsés	Városi Sportcsarnok
Veszprém KC (U23)	Veszprém	Március 15. úti Sportcsarnok
Veszprémi KSE	Veszprém	Március 15. úti Sportcsarnok

=== Eastern Group ===
The following 14 clubs compete in the NB I/B (Eastern) during the 2016–17 season:

Team	Location	Arena
FKSE Algyő	Algyő	Fehér Ignác Ált. Isk.
Balassagyarmati Kábel SE	Balassagyarmat	Városi Sportcsarnok
Békési FKC	Békés	Városi Sportcsarnokban
Ferencvárosi TC	Budapest, IX. ker	Elek Gyula Aréna
Kecskeméti TE	Kecskemét	Messzi István Sportcsarnok
Mizse KC	Lajosmizse	Fekete István Ált. isk.
Nyíregyházi SN	Nyíregyháza	Continental Aréna
VKK Nyírbátor	Nyírbátor	Városi Sportcsarnok
Ózdi KC	Ózd	Marosi István Sportcsarnok
SC Pick Szeged (U23)	Szeged	Városi stadion
Szigetszentmiklósi KSK	Szigetszentmiklós	Városi Sportcsarnoka
Tiszavasvári SE	Tiszavasvári	Városi Sportcsarnok
Törökszentmiklósi Székács	Törökszentmiklós	Székács Sportcsarnok
Törökszentmiklósi KE	Törökszentmiklós	Városi Sportcsarnok

== League table ==
=== Western Group ===
	Team	Pld	W	D	L	GF	GA	Diff	Pts	Qualification or relegation	Head-to-head
1	Dabas VSE KC (C, P)	26	22	1	3	749	620	+129	45	Promotion to Nemzeti Bajnokság I	
2	ETO - SZESE Győr FKC	26	17	1	8	721	656	+65	35		
3	PLER-Budapest	26	17	0	9	710	639	+71	34		PLER - VES: 32–27; VES - PLER: 33–28
4	Telekom Veszprém U23	26	17	0	9	764	698	+66	34		PLER - VES: 32–27; VES - PLER: 33–28
5	Százhalombattai KE	26	15	1	10	708	721	−13	31		
6	Pécsi VSE	26	14	2	10	709	683	+26	30		
7	Balatonfüredi KSE U23	26	14	0	12	707	712	−5	28		
8	Tatai AC	26	13	1	12	678	650	+28	27		
9	Vecsés SE	26	12	2	12	715	703	+12	26		
10	Veszprémi KSE	26	12	1	13	648	654	−6	25		
11	Csurgói KK U23	26	8	1	17	737	798	−61	17		
12	NEKA	26	6	3	17	719	786	−67	15	Relegation to Nemzeti Bajnokság II	
13	Alba-MÁV-Előre (R)	26	4	1	21	658	771	−113	9	Relegation to Nemzeti Bajnokság II	
14	Pénzügyőr SE (R)	26	4	0	22	646	778	−132	8	Relegation to Nemzeti Bajnokság II	

Pld - Played; W - Won; D - Drawn; L - Lost; GF - Goals for; GA - Goals against; Diff - Difference; Pts - Points.
(C) Champion; (P) Promoted; (R) Relegated.

=== Eastern Group ===
	Team	Pld	W	D	L	GF	GA	Diff	Pts	Qualification or relegation	Head-to-head
1	Ferencvárosi TC (C, P)	26	26	0	0	851	643	+208	52	Promotion to Nemzeti Bajnokság I	
2	ContiTech FKSE-Algyő	26	16	3	7	781	700	+81	35		
3	Békés-Drén KC	26	16	1	9	776	700	+76	33		
4	MOL-Pick Szeged U23	26	14	2	10	752	737	+15	30		
5	KTE-KISOKOS	26	13	3	10	705	646	+59	29		
6	Nyíregyházi SN	26	14	0	12	746	733	+13	28		
7	Szigetszentmiklósi KSK	26	13	1	12	724	711	+13	27		SzKSK - ÓKC: 27–22; ÓKC - SzKSK: 31–27
8	ÓAM-Ózdi KC	26	12	3	11	717	727	−10	27		SzKSK - ÓKC: 27–22; ÓKC - SzKSK: 31–27
9	Törökszentmiklósi KE	26	11	2	13	713	752	−39	24		
10	Mizse KC	26	10	3	13	653	671	−18	23		MKC: 6 pts TSz: 4 pts BKSE: 2 pts
11	Törökszentmiklósi Székács	26	10	3	13	676	703	−27	23		MKC: 6 pts TSz: 4 pts BKSE: 2 pts
12	Balassagyarmati Kábel SE	26	10	3	13	668	678	−10	23	Relegation to Nemzeti Bajnokság II	MKC: 6 pts TSz: 4 pts BKSE: 2 pts
13	Tiszavasvári SE-QUICK 2000 (R)	26	4	0	22	698	818	−120	8	Relegation to Nemzeti Bajnokság II	
14	VKK Nyírbátor (R)	26	1	0	25	602	843	−241	2	Relegation to Nemzeti Bajnokság II	

Pld - Played; W - Won; D - Drawn; L - Lost; GF - Goals for; GA - Goals against; Diff - Difference; Pts - Points.
(C) Champion; (P) Promoted; (R) Relegated.

== See also ==
- 2016–17 Magyar Kupa
- 2016–17 Nemzeti Bajnokság I
- 2016–17 Nemzeti Bajnokság II
