= Ferencvárosi TC (men's handball) =

Hungarian handball club

- Full name: Ferencvárosi Torna Club
- Nickname: Fradi
- Short name: FTC
- Founded: 1950; 76 years ago
- Arena: Elek Gyula Aréna, Budapest
- Capacity: 1,300
- Head coach: György Kiss
- League: Nemzeti Bajnokság I
- Club colours
Home	Away

Ferencvárosi Torna Club is a Hungarian team handball club from Budapest, that plays in the Nemzeti Bajnokság I.

The current name of the club is Ferencvárosi TC-Green Collect due to sponsorship reasons.

Location of FTC
Location of FTC

== History ==
=== Early history ===
The men's handball department of the Ferencvárosi Torna Club, as well as the women's handball team, were founded in 1950. The history of Nemzeti Bajnokság I began in 1954, with significant initial successes. In 1955, they won a silver medal. In 1956, they were able to celebrate a shared championship title, although no gold medal was awarded, as the announcement of the result of the final against Vörös Meteor in October 1956, which was rigged due to political pressure, was first washed away by the popular anger of the fans, and then the match, which was called for a replay after the warning, was thwarted by the revolution. The decision that Ferencváros was also champion was made months later, in 1957. They won a silver medal in 1957, bronze medals in 1958 and 1962, and won the Hungarian Cup in 1963.

=== 1963-2010 ===
In the decades that followed, the band moved between the Nemzeti Bajnokság I and Nemzeti Bajnokság I/B, during which they were able to register a greater success, the 1980 Nemzeti Bajnokság I championship silver medal. At the end of the 2008-2009 season, they won the championship in the Nemzeti Bajnokság I/B, so they were again classified in the highest division. Former player and coach of Pick Szeged, Vladan Matić, was appointed as coach, with the aim of fighting to stay in. At the end of the season, Matić's team finished in 9th place. In the 2009-2010 season, the team could also compete in the international cup, in the EHF Cup Winners' Cup, as Gyöngyösi KK, the 2009 Hungarian Cup bronze medalist, did not undertake to compete in the international series for financial reasons. Ferencváros joined the cup series in the 3rd round, where the opponent was the Slovenian RK Koper. The Ferencváros team suffered 2 defeats and bid farewell to international cup participation.

=== 2010-Present day ===
At the beginning of the 2010-2011 season, such players as Dániel Buday, Igor Kos, György Bakos, Teodor Paul came to the team. This team was able to stand on the podium again after the 1980 championship season: it won a bronze medal in front of Tatabánya Carbonex KC. This season, the team also achieved good results in the Hungarian Cup. In the 4th round, an Ferencvárosi TC-Pick Szeged match was held to reach the top 8. Ferencvárosi TC succeeded in overcoming the obstacle: they eliminated Pick Szeged with a 25:24 victory at home. In the next round of the cup, in order to reach the semi-finals, the capital city should have played against MKB Veszprém KC, but after disputing the circumstances of the promotion, they did not do so and withdrew from the cup. In the summer of 2011, Vladan Matić became the head coach of the Slovenian RK Celje. Thanks to the championship bronze medal, the handball players also won the right to participate in the international cup competition, the EHF Cup. It is true, as it turned out later, that Ferencváros will merge with the PLER KC team, so it will be able to compete in the EHF Cup Winners' Cup in the international competition (PLER KC played in the Hungarian Cup final and thus earned the right to start in the aforementioned series.) The band played under the name PLER-FTC for two years, in the first joint season they finished seventh and then fifth in the championship. In the summer of 2013, the two clubs separated, and Ferencváros has been in the second division since then. In the 2016-17 season, the team won the second division championship undefeated, so it could play in Nemzeti Bajnokság I again from the following season.

== Crest, colours, supporters ==
=== Naming history ===
Name	Period
FTC	−2008
FTC-Cityline	2008–2010
Celebi FTC	2010–2011
FTC-PLER Budapest	2011–2013
FTC-Bástyamillenium	2013–2014
FTC	2014–2019
FTC-HungaroControl	2019–2020
FTC	2020–2023
FTC-Green Collect	2023–

=== Kit manufacturers ===
Period	Kit manufacturer
–2024	(United States) Nike
2024–present	(Italy) Macron

=== Kits ===
HOME
1985–86	2013–18	2018–23	2023–24	2024–25	2025–26

AWAY
2009–10	2013–15; 2016–17	2015–16; 2017–18; 2019–22	2018–19	2022–24	2024–26

== Sports Hall information ==
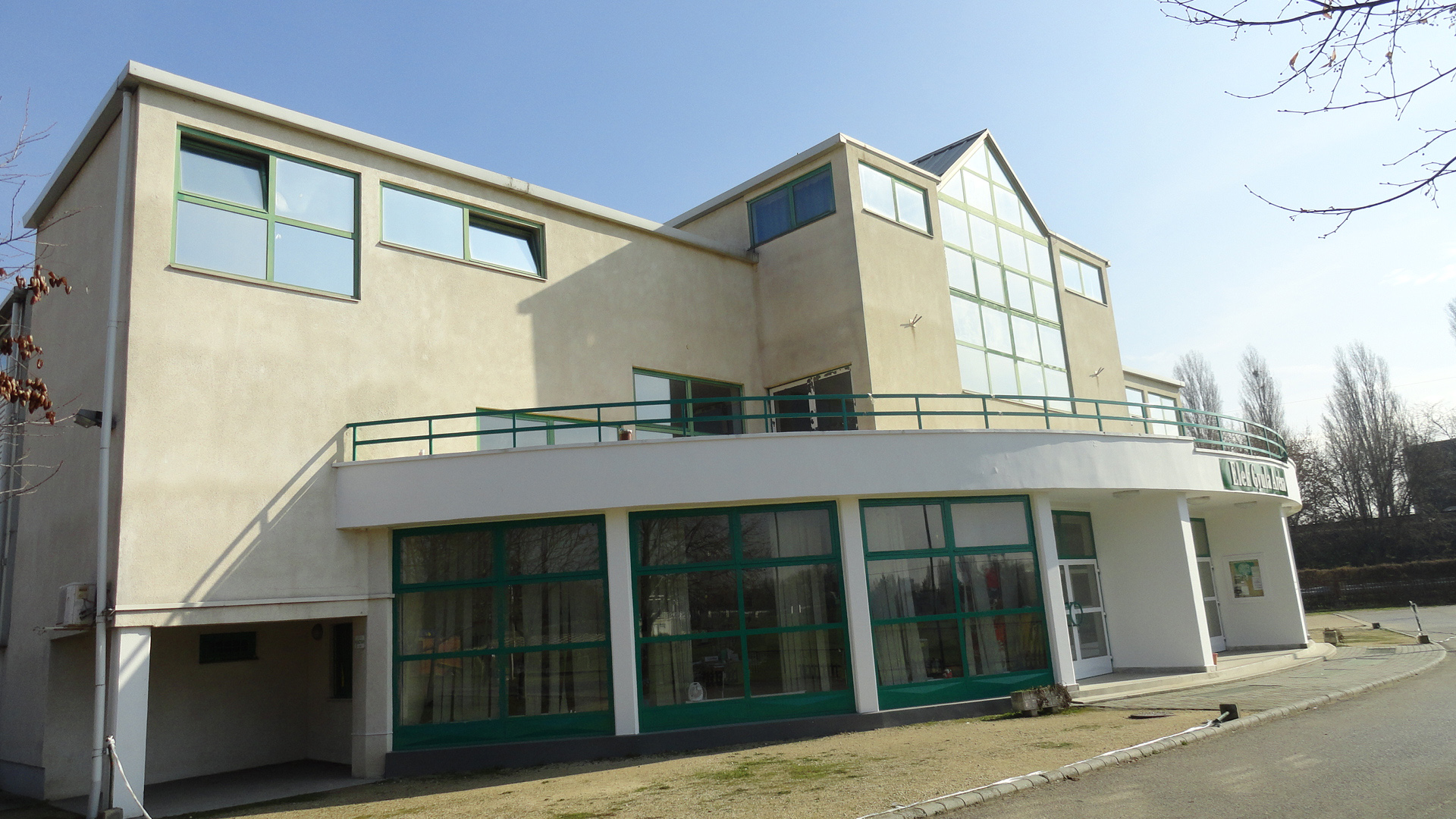
Home hall: Elek Gyula Aréna

- Name: – Elek Gyula Aréna
- City: – Budapest, IX. ker
- Capacity: – 1300
- Address: – 1101 Budapest, Kőbányai út 47./A

== Management ==
Position	Name
President	(Hungary) Gábor Kubatov
Executive Vice President	(Hungary) Zoltán Nyíri
Director – General For Economic Affairs	(Hungary) Miklós Szalai
Executive Director	(Hungary) Zsolt Görög
Technical manager	(Hungary) Máté Szaszkó
Member Of The Board	(Hungary) Beatrix Kökény
Member Of The Board	(Hungary) András Sike
Member Of The Board	(Hungary) Gyula Rákosi
Member Of The Board	(Hungary) Tibor Rékasi
Member Of The Board	(Hungary) Dr. János Bácskai
Member Of The Board	(Hungary) György Rieb
Male And Youth Head Of Department	(Hungary) Sándor Király

== Team ==
=== Current squad ===
Squad for the 2026–27 season

FTC

Goalkeepers

- 12 (Hungary) Ádám Balogh
- 16 (Hungary) Bence Magyar
- 61 (Hungary) Krisztián Mikler

Left Wingers

- 22 (Hungary) Máté Síró
- 39 (Hungary) Ádám Juhász
- 99 (Hungary) Péter Kovacsics

Right Wingers

- 18 (Hungary) Richárd Csanálosi
- 25 (Hungary) Boldizsár Kovács
- 94 (Hungary) Bendegúz Bujdosó (c)

Line Players

- 3 (Hungary) Ákos Török
- 37 (Hungary) Géza Bodnár
- (Hungary) Zsombor Győri

Central Backs

- 19 (Hungary) Márk Mészáros
- 29 (Hungary) Dániel Tarjányi
- 66 (Hungary) Máté Lékai
- 72 (Hungary) Máté Konczos

Left Backs

- 9 (Hungary) Bence Bálint
- 11 (Hungary) Bence Nagy
- 20 (Hungary) Donát Elter
- 21 (Hungary) Máté Furka
- 33 (Hungary) Tamás Koller

Right Backs

- 2 (Hungary) Péter Tóth

=== Technical staff ===
- Head coach: (Hungary) György Kiss
- Assistant coach: (Hungary) István Szénási
- Goalkeeping coach: (Hungary) Norbert Duleba
- Goalkeeping coach: (Hungary) Pál Gera
- Fitness coach: (Hungary) Ádám Szakács
- Masseur: (Hungary) Máté Varga
- Physiotherapist: (Hungary) Márk Dániel

=== Transfers ===
Transfers for the 2026–27 season

Joining

- (Hungary) Bence Bálint (LB) from (Hungary) HE-DO B. Braun Gyöngyös
- (Hungary) Géza Bodnár (LP) from (Hungary) Budai Farkasok KKUK
- (Hungary) Krisztián Mikler (GK) on loan from (Hungary) HE-DO B. Braun Gyöngyös

Leaving

- (Hungary) Gábor Ancsin (RB)
- (Hungary) Miklós Karai (LP) to (Hungary) MOL Tatabánya KC
- (Hungary) Ádám Borbély (GK) to (Hungary) Győri ETO-UNI FKC
- (Hungary) Mátyás Győri (LB) to (Hungary) Győri ETO-UNI FKC
- (Hungary) Kristóf Győri (GK) to (Hungary) Győri ETO-UNI FKC
- (Hungary) Dániel Füzi (LP) to (Hungary) Győri ETO-UNI FKC
- (Hungary) Kristóf Csörgő (CB) to (Hungary) OTP Bank – Pick Szeged
- (Hungary) Ádám Horváth-Garaba (LB) to (Germany) ASV Hamm-Westfalen
- (Hungary) Dávid Debreczeni (LP) to (Hungary) Szigetszentmiklósi KSK
- (Hungary) Viktor Prainer (LB) to (Hungary) Budai Farkasok KKUK
- (Hungary) Huba Czabula (CB) to (Hungary) Várpalotai BSK

Transfers for the 2025–26 season

Joining

- (Hungary) Péter Tóth (RB) from (Hungary) Csurgói KK
- (Hungary) Tamás Koller (LB) from (Hungary) Dabas KK
- (Hungary) Richárd Csanálosi (RW) on loan from (Hungary) NEKA
- (Hungary) Huba Czabula (CB) from (Hungary) QHB-Eger

Leaving

- (Slovakia) Jakub Mikita (LB) to (Hungary) PLER-Budapest
- (Hungary) Máté Ónodi-Jánoskúti (RB) to (France) USAM Nîmes Gard
- (Hungary) Ádám Tóth (RW) to (Hungary) PLER-Budapest
- (Hungary) Máté Mészáros (LP) on loan at (Hungary) NEKA

Transfers for the 2024–25 season

Joining

- (Hungary) Mátyás Győri (CB) from (Hungary) MOL Tatabánya KC
- (Hungary) Gábor Ancsin (RB) from (Hungary) MOL Tatabánya KC
- (Hungary) Ádám Tóth (RW) from (Hungary) PLER-Budapest
- (Hungary) Miklós Karai (LP) back from loan at (Hungary) NEKA
- (Hungary) Ádám Juhász (LW) back from loan at (Hungary) OTP Bank - Pick Szeged U21

Leaving

- (Hungary) Bence Imre (RW) to (Germany) THW Kiel
- (Hungary) Alex Bognár (CB) to (Slovenia) RK Celje
- (Hungary) Zsolt Balogh (RB) to (Hungary) Győri ETO-UNI FKC
- (Hungary) Bálint Pordán (LP) to (Hungary) PLER-Budapest
- (Hungary) Zsombor Szepesi (LW) loan back to (Hungary) SC Pick Szeged

Transfers for the 2023–24 season

Joining

- (Hungary) Zsombor Szepesi (LW) on loan from (Hungary) Pick Szeged

Leaving

- (Hungary) Sándor Bohács (LW) to (Hungary) Tiszavasvári SE
- (Hungary) Márton Szabados (LW) to (Hungary) Győri ETO-UNI FKC
- (Hungary) Ádám Török (CB) to (Hungary) Dabas KK
- (Hungary) Félix Turák (LP) to (Hungary) Szigetszentmiklósi KSK
- (Hungary) Ádám Juhász (LW) on loan at (Hungary) Pick Szeged

Transfers for the 2022–23 season

Joining

- (Hungary) Máté Lékai (CB) from (Hungary) Telekom Veszprém
- (Hungary) Zsolt Balogh (RB) from (Hungary) Grundfos Tatabánya KC
- (Hungary) Ádám Borbély (GK) from (Hungary) Veszprém KKFT Felsőörs
- (Hungary) Ádám Török (CB) from (Hungary) Dabas KK
- (Hungary) Kristóf Csörgő (CB) from (Hungary) Mezőkövesdi KC

Leaving

- (Montenegro) Božo Anđelić (CB) to (Ukraine) HC Motor Zaporizhzhia
- (Slovakia) Marián Žernovič (GK) to (Switzerland) TSV St. Otmar St. Gallen
- (Hungary) Xavér Deményi (GK) to (Hungary) NEKA
- (Hungary) Szabolcs Tóth (CB) to (Hungary) Budakalász FKC
- (Hungary) Márk Vári (RB) to (Hungary) Balatonfüredi KSE
- (Hungary) Péter Kende (CB) to (Hungary) Ceglédi KKSE
- (Hungary) Bence Burony (LP) to (Hungary) Csépe Salgótarjáni SKC
- (Hungary) Miklós Karai (LP) on loan at (Hungary) NEKA
- (Hungary) Félix Turák (LP) on loan at (Hungary) Budai Farkasok KKUK

Transfers for the 2020–21 season

Joining

- (Hungary) Dániel Füzi (LP) from (Hungary) DVTK-Eger
- (Hungary) Xavér Deményi (GK) from (Hungary) Grundfos Tatabánya KC

Leaving

- (Hungary) Dávid Debreczeni (LP) to (Hungary) Grundfos Tatabánya KC
- (Hungary) Benedek Szakály (RW) to (Hungary) Veszprém KKFT Felsőörs
- (United States) (Hungary) Pál Merkovszki (GK) to (Hungary) Gyöngyösi KK
- (Serbia) Nikola Ivanović (RB) to (Serbia) RK Partizan
- (Hungary) Bence Holdosi (LW) to (Hungary) DVTK-Eger

Transfers for the 2019–20 season

Joining

- (Hungary) Bence Nagy (LB) from (Hungary) Grundfos Tatabánya KC
- (Hungary) Zsolt Schäffer (RB) from (Hungary) Grundfos Tatabánya KC
- (Hungary) Sándor Bohács (LW) from (Hungary) Budakalász FKC
- (Slovakia) Jakub Mikita (LB) from (Hungary) Ceglédi KKSE
- (Hungary) Kristóf Győri (GK) from (Hungary) NEKA
- (Serbia) Nikola Ivanović (RB) from (Serbia) RK Partizan
- (Hungary) Alex Bognár (CB) from (Hungary) Váci KSE
- (Hungary) Félix Turák (LP) from (Hungary) Csömör KSK

Leaving

- (Hungary) Gábor Ancsin (RB) loan back to (Hungary) Telekom Veszprém
- (Georgia (country)) Teimuraz Orjonikidze (LB) to (Hungary) Orosházi FKSE
- (Montenegro) Rade Mijatović (GK)
- (Hungary) Gábor Pálos (LW) to (Hungary) Budai Farkasok KKUK
- (Hungary) Tamás Oláh (RB) to (Hungary) Sport36-Komló
- (Hungary) Richárd Bali (LB) to (Hungary) Hatvani KSZSE
- (Hungary) Bálint Dénes Dósa (LP) to (Hungary) Tatai AC
- (Hungary) József Tóth (LP) loan back to (Hungary) MOL-Pick Szeged
- (Hungary) Félix Turák (LP) on loan at (Hungary) Csömör KSK

Transfers for the 2018–19 season

Joining

- (Hungary) Timuzsin Schuch (LP) from (Hungary) Telekom Veszprém
- (Hungary) Gábor Ancsin (RB) on loan from (Hungary) Telekom Veszprém
- (Hungary) Benedek Szakály (RW) from (Hungary) Telekom Veszprém
- (Montenegro) Rade Mijatović (GK) from (Belarus) HC Meshkov Brest
- (Hungary) Dávid Debreczeni (LP) from (Hungary) Balatonfüredi KSE
- (Hungary) Péter Kovacsics (LW) from (Hungary) Gyöngyösi KK
- (Georgia (country)) Teimuraz Orjonikidze (LB) from (North Macedonia) RK Pelister
- (Hungary) Bence Holdosi (LW) from (Hungary) PLER KC
- (United States) (Hungary) Pál Merkovszki (GK) from (Hungary) PLER KC
- (Hungary) József Tóth (LP) on loan from (Hungary) MOL-Pick Szeged

Leaving

- (Hungary) György Bakos (LW) to (Hungary) Csömör KSK
- (Hungary) Bence Benis (RW) to (Hungary) Tatai AC
- (Hungary) Mohamed Yassine Benmiloud (LP) to (Hungary) Vecsési SE
- (Hungary) Máté Marczinkó (RB) to (Hungary) Vecsési SE
- (Hungary) Gábor Grebenár (LB) to (Hungary) PLER KC
- (Hungary) Máté Nagy (LW) to (Hungary) PLER KC
- (Hungary) Krisztián Rédai (LB) to (Hungary) PLER KC
- (Hungary) Adrián Cseh (RW) to (Hungary) PLER KC
- (Hungary) András Kocsi (LP) to (Hungary) Váci KSE
- (Hungary) Gergely Pál (LB) to (Hungary) Váci KSE
- (Egypt) Khaled Essam (LW) to (Hungary) Rév TSC
- (Hungary) Levente Nagy (GK) to (Hungary) Rákosmenti KSK
- (Hungary) Barnabás Tass (LB) to (Hungary) Százhalombattai KE
- (Hungary) Bence Mikita (CB) to (Hungary) Mezőkövesdi KC

Transfers for the 2017–18 season

Joining

- (Slovakia) Marián Žernovič (GK) from (Slovakia) HKM Sala
- (Hungary) Gábor Grebenár (LB) from (Austria) HSG Bärnbach/Köflach
- (Hungary) Bálint Pordán (LP) from (Hungary) Csurgói KK
- (Hungary) Richárd Bali (LB) from (Hungary) Balmazújvárosi KK
- (Hungary) Krisztián Rédai (LB) from (Hungary) Budakalász FKC
- (Hungary) Tamás Oláh (RB) from (Hungary) Orosházi FKSE
- (Hungary) Bence Mikita (CB) from (Hungary) NEKA
- (Egypt) Khaled Essam (LW) from (Egypt) Al Ahly SC
- (Montenegro) Božo Anđelić (CB) from (North Macedonia) RK Metalurg Skopje

Leaving

- (Hungary) Sándor Bak (CB) to (Hungary) PLER KC
- (Hungary) Renátó Nikolicza (LB) to (Hungary) Százhalombattai KE
- (Hungary) Béla Márkus (LB) to (Hungary) Gödöllői KC
- (Hungary) Dániel Takó (RB) to (Hungary) Vecsési SE
- (Hungary) László Varga (LP) to (Hungary) Szigetszentmiklósi KSK
- (Hungary) Ervin Tuba Kovács (GK) to (Hungary) Rákosmenti KSK

Transfers for the 2016–17 season

Joining

- (Hungary) György Bakos (LW) from (Hungary) PLER KC
- (Hungary) Bendegúz Bujdosó (RW) from (Hungary) PLER KC
- (Hungary) András Kocsi (LP) from (Hungary) PLER KC
- (Hungary) Mohamed Yassine Benmiloud (LP) from (Hungary) PLER KC
- (Hungary) Máté Nagy (LW) from (Hungary) Csurgói KK
- (Hungary) Gábor Pálos (LW) from (Denmark) Vesthimmerland
- (Hungary) Máté Marczinkó (RB) from (Hungary) Gyöngyösi KK
- (Hungary) Gergely Pál (LB) from (Hungary) Váci KSE
- (Hungary) Levente Nagy (GK) from (Hungary) Nyíregyháza SN KFT
- (Hungary) Bence Benis (RW) from (Hungary) Mezőkövesdi KC
- (Hungary) Krisztián Rédai (LB) on loan from (Hungary) Budakalász FKC

Leaving

- (Hungary) Endre Komendánt (GK) to (Germany) TV Emsdetten
- (Hungary) Norbert Nagy (RW) to (Hungary) Mezőkövesdi KC
- (Hungary) Ádám Bujtár (RW) to (Hungary) Sport36-Komló
- (Hungary) Péter Simányi (RB) to (Hungary) Vecsési SE
- (Hungary) András Bártfay (LW) to (Hungary) Csömör KSK
- (Hungary) Zsolt Félegyházi (LB) to (Hungary) Százhalombattai KE
- (Hungary) Árpád Gyurcsovics (LP) to (Hungary) Százhalombattai KE
- (Hungary) Gábor Grandjean (LW) to (Hungary) Szigetszentmiklósi KSK
- (Hungary) Tamás Mogyorósi (LW) to (Hungary) Pénzügyőr SE
- (Hungary) László Zalai (RW) to (Hungary) Budai Farkasok KKUK
- (Hungary) Balázs Pozsgai (CB)
- (Hungary) Márk Holló (GK) loan back to (Hungary) Gyöngyösi KK
- (Hungary) István Mátó (LP) loan back to (Hungary) Balatonfüredi KSE

== Previous squads ==
2024–2025 Team
Shirt No	Nationality	Player	Birth Date	Position
5	Hungary	Ádám Horváth-Garaba	7 December 2007 (age 18)	Left Back
9	Hungary	Dániel Füzi	9 August 1996 (age 30)	Line Player
11	Hungary	Bence Nagy	5 July 1995 (age 31)	Left Back
12	Hungary	Ádám Balogh	14 March 2006 (age 20)	Goalkeeper
17	Hungary	Máté Ónodi-Jánoskúti	17 June 2002 (age 24)	Right Back
22	Hungary	Mátyás Győri	2 February 1997 (age 29)	Central Back
23	Hungary	Dávid Debreczeni	23 September 1992 (age 34)	Line Player
24	Hungary	Ádám Borbély	22 June 1995 (age 31)	Goalkeeper
27	Hungary	Gábor Ancsin	27 November 1990 (age 35)	Right Back
34	Hungary	Miklós Karai	22 September 2002 (age 24)	Line Player
39	Hungary	Ádám Juhász	29 June 2005 (age 21)	Left Winger
44	Hungary	Viktor Prainer	25 April 2001 (age 25)	Left Back
66	Hungary	Máté Lékai	16 June 1988 (age 38)	Central Back
67	Hungary	Kristóf Győri	25 June 2000 (age 26)	Goalkeeper
71	Hungary	Ádám Tóth	18 October 1995 (age 31)	Right Winger
77	Hungary	Kristóf Csörgő	17 March 2004 (age 22)	Central Back
81	Slovakia	Jakub Mikita	7 May 1993 (age 33)	Left Back
94	Hungary	Bendegúz Bujdosó	10 December 1994 (age 31)	Right Winger
99	Hungary	Péter Kovacsics	13 June 1994 (age 32)	Left Winger

2022–2023 Team
Shirt No	Nationality	Player	Birth Date	Position
2	Hungary	Félix Turák	29 December 2001 (age 24)	Line Player
7	Hungary	Alex Bognár	25 September 2000 (age 26)	Central Back
9	Hungary	Dániel Füzi	9 August 1996 (age 30)	Line Player
11	Hungary	Bence Nagy	5 July 1995 (age 31)	Left Back
17	Hungary	Máté Ónodi-Jánoskúti	17 June 2002 (age 24)	Right Back
18	Hungary	Bence Imre	15 October 2002 (age 24)	Right Winger
19	Hungary	Zsolt Balogh	29 March 1989 (age 37)	Right Back
22	Hungary	Bálint Pordán	12 October 1988 (age 38)	Line Player
23	Hungary	Dávid Debreczeni	23 September 1992 (age 34)	Line Player
24	Hungary	Ádám Borbély	22 June 1995 (age 31)	Goalkeeper
29	Hungary	Ádám Juhász	29 June 2005 (age 21)	Left Winger
30	Hungary	Ádám Török	26 May 1997 (age 29)	Central Back
39	Hungary	Sándor Bohács	5 September 1994 (age 32)	Left Winger
44	Hungary	Viktor Prainer	25 April 2001 (age 25)	Left Back
66	Hungary	Máté Lékai	16 June 1988 (age 38)	Central Back
67	Hungary	Kristóf Győri	25 June 2000 (age 26)	Goalkeeper
77	Hungary	Kristóf Csörgő	17 March 2004 (age 22)	Central Back
81	Slovakia	Jakub Mikita	7 May 1993 (age 33)	Left Back
94	Hungary	Bendegúz Bujdosó	10 December 1994 (age 31)	Right Winger
99	Hungary	Péter Kovacsics	13 June 1994 (age 32)	Left Winger

2018–2019 Team
Shirt No	Nationality	Player	Birth Date	Position
1	Montenegro	Rade Mijatović	30 June 1981 (age 45)	Goalkeeper
3	Hungary	Bence Holdosi	17 December 2000 (age 25)	Left Winger
5	Hungary	Timuzsin Schuch	5 June 1985 (age 41)	Line Player
8	Hungary	Benedek Szakály	7 September 1997 (age 29)	Right Winger
9	Hungary	Tamás Oláh	14 February 1993 (age 33)	Right Back
11	Hungary	Máté Ónodi-Jánoskúti	17 June 2002 (age 24)	Right Back
12	United StatesHungary	Pál Merkovszki	5 May 2000 (age 26)	Goalkeeper
14	Hungary	Gábor Pálos	21 June 1985 (age 41)	Left Winger
15	Hungary	Bence Imre	15 October 2002 (age 24)	Right Winger
19	Georgia	Teimuraz Orjonikidze	7 February 1996 (age 30)	Left Back
22	Hungary	Bálint Pordán	12 October 1988 (age 38)	Line Player
23	Hungary	Dávid Debreczeni	23 September 1992 (age 34)	Line Player
27	Hungary	Gábor Ancsin	27 November 1990 (age 35)	Right Back
30	Hungary	Richárd Bali	30 March 1989 (age 37)	Left Back
32	Montenegro	Božo Anđelić	27 November 1990 (age 35)	Central Back
44	Hungary	Viktor Prainer	25 April 2001 (age 25)	Left Back
48	Hungary	József Tóth	23 June 1999 (age 27)	Line Player
67	Slovakia	Marián Žernovič	1 July 1991 (age 35)	Goalkeeper
72	Hungary	Péter Lukács	30 July 2002 (age 24)	Central Back
89	Hungary	Bálint Dénes Dósa	8 January 1998 (age 28)	Line Player
91	Hungary	Bence Kiss	30 December 2000 (age 25)	Central Back
94	Hungary	Bendegúz Bujdosó	10 December 1994 (age 31)	Right Winger
97	Hungary	Bence Mikita	13 December 1997 (age 28)	Central Back
99	Hungary	Péter Kovacsics	13 June 1994 (age 32)	Left Winger

2016–2017 Team
Shirt No	Nationality	Player	Birth Date	Position
1	Hungary	Ervin Tuba Kovács	10 August 1982 (age 44)	Goalkeeper
2	Hungary	Sándor Bak	30 October 1991 (age 35)	Central Back
6	Hungary	András Kocsi	30 January 1985 (age 41)	Line Player
9	Hungary	Dániel Takó	6 March 1993 (age 33)	Right Winger
12	Hungary	Levente Nagy	16 December 1982 (age 43)	Goalkeeper
13	Hungary	Mohamed Yassine Benmiloud	4 March 1990 (age 36)	Line Player
14	Hungary	Gábor Pálos	21 June 1985 (age 41)	Left Winger
18	Hungary	Barnabás Tass	2 September 1998 (age 28)	Left Back
19	Hungary	László Varga	19 August 1991 (age 35)	Line Player
20	Hungary	György Bakos	28 May 1984 (age 42)	Central Back
21	Hungary	Gergely Pál	18 May 1985 (age 41)	Left Back
22	Hungary	Bence Benis	22 February 1989 (age 37)	Right Winger
23	Hungary	Máté Marczinkó	23 January 1991 (age 35)	Right Back
24	Hungary	Renátó Nikolicza	24 July 1989 (age 37)	Left Back
66	Hungary	Máté Nagy	13 March 1986 (age 40)	Left Winger
94	Hungary	Bendegúz Bujdosó	10 December 1994 (age 31)	Right Winger
95	Hungary	Krisztián Rédai	29 July 1995 (age 31)	Left Back

2010–2011 Team
Shirt No	Nationality	Player	Birth Date	Position
1	Hungary	Zsolt Tamási	28 November 1991 (age 34)	Goalkeeper
2	Hungary	Dániel Buday	5 January 1981 (age 45)	Central Back
4	Hungary	Csaba Bendó	30 November 1973 (age 52)	Right Winger
6	Bosnia and Herzegovina	Marinko Kelečević	26 July 1985 (age 41)	Left Back
7	Hungary	Tamás Németh	27 January 1985 (age 41)	Left Winger
8	Hungary	Zsolt Török	31 October 1972 (age 54)	Line Player
10	Hungary	Károly Wieszt	23 June 1985 (age 41)	Left Back
12	Hungary	Zsolt Perger	23 February 1970 (age 56)	Goalkeeper
14	Hungary	György Bakos	28 May 1984 (age 42)	Central Back
19	Hungary	József Czina	24 November 1980 (age 45)	Left Back
20	Hungary	Sándor Lepsényi	23 March 1989 (age 37)	Left Back
22	Slovakia	Martin Mazak	17 April 1984 (age 42)	Line Player
23	Hungary	Zsolt Wieszt	23 September 1981 (age 45)	Right Winger
26	Croatia	Igor Kos	17 February 1978 (age 48)	Right Back
29	Hungary	József Tóth	17 January 1980 (age 46)	Central Back
55	Slovakia	Teodor Paul	22 April 1987 (age 39)	Goalkeeper

2009–2010 Team
Shirt No	Nationality	Player	Birth Date	Position
1	Hungary	Zsolt Tamási	28 November 1991 (age 34)	Goalkeeper
2	Cuba	José Savon	7 August 1969 (age 57)	Right Winger
4	Hungary	Zsolt Török	31 October 1972 (age 54)	Line Player
4	Hungary	Csaba Bendó	30 November 1973 (age 52)	Right Winger
5	Hungary	Zsolt Mórocz	9 October 1977 (age 49)	Left Winger
6	Bosnia and Herzegovina	Marinko Kelečević	26 July 1985 (age 41)	Left Back
7	Hungary	Tamás Németh	27 January 1985 (age 41)	Left Winger
8	Hungary	Gergely Harsányi	3 May 1981 (age 45)	Right Winger
9	Hungary	Roland Sándor	13 March 1989 (age 37)	Central Back
10	Hungary	Károly Wieszt	23 June 1985 (age 41)	Left Back
11	Hungary	József Molnár	30 March 1970 (age 56)	Line Player
12	Hungary	Zsolt Perger	23 February 1970 (age 56)	Goalkeeper
15	Czech Republic	Viktor Hastik	21 January 1985 (age 41)	Central Back
16	Hungary	Koppány Tóth	1 August 1988 (age 38)	Goalkeeper
19	Hungary	József Czina	24 November 1980 (age 45)	Left Back
20	Slovakia	Marian Kleis	8 September 1984 (age 42)	Left Winger
22	Slovakia	Martin Mazak	17 April 1984 (age 42)	Line Player
23	Hungary	Zsolt Wieszt	23 September 1981 (age 45)	Right Winger
32	Hungary	Gergely Kovács	26 August 1976 (age 50)	Line Player
75	Hungary	Imre Kiss	28 September 1975 (age 51)	Right Back

== Top scorers ==
Season	Player	Apps/Goals
2007–2008	(Cuba) José Savon	22/241
2008–2009	(Cuba) José Savon	19/152
2009–2010	(Bosnia and Herzegovina) Marinko Kelečević	13/103
2010–2011	(Bosnia and Herzegovina) Marinko Kelečević	30/186
2011–2012	(Hungary) Gábor Pálos	26/95
2012–2013	(Hungary) Péter Lendvay	25/108
2013–2014	(Hungary) Béla Márkus	26/132
2014–2015	(Hungary) Balázs Pozsgai	26/137
2015–2016	(Hungary) Dániel Takó	26/102
2016–2017	(Hungary) Máté Marczinkó	26/122
2017–2018	(Hungary) Gábor Pálos	26/80
2018–2019	(Hungary) Gábor Ancsin	24/144
2019–2020	Cancelled	
2020–2021	(Hungary) Bence Nagy	25/117
2021–2022	(Hungary) Bence Nagy	26/171
2022–2023	(Hungary) Bence Nagy	25/153
2023–2024	(Hungary) Bence Nagy	25/144
2024–2025	(Hungary) Bence Nagy	24/102
2025–2026	(Hungary) Mátyás Győri	26/106

== Honours ==
Honours	No.	Years
League
Nemzeti Bajnokság I Winners	1	1956
Nemzeti Bajnokság I Runners-up	3	1955, 1957, 1980
Nemzeti Bajnokság I Third Place	4	1958, 1962, 2010–11, 2024–25
Nemzeti Bajnokság I/B Winners	2	2008–09, 2016–17
Nemzeti Bajnokság I/B Runners-up	1	2015–16
Nemzeti Bajnokság I/B Third Place	1	2014–15
Domestic cups
Magyar Kupa Winners	1	1963
Magyar Kupa Runners-up	2	1979
Magyar Kupa Third Place	2	1964, 1977
Best European Results
EHF Cup Winners' Cup Third Round	1	2009–10
EHF European League (EHF Cup) (IHF Cup) Round of 16	1	2022–23
EHF European Cup (EHF City Cup) Semifinal	1	2023–24

=== Individual awards ===
==== Domestic ====
Nemzeti Bajnokság I Top Scorer

Season	Name	Goals
2010–11	(Bosnia and Herzegovina) Marinko Kelečević	186
2021–22	(Hungary) Bence Nagy	171
2023–24	(Hungary) Bence Nagy	144

== Seasons ==
=== Season to season ===
As of 08/07/2025

- As Ferencvárosi TC

Season	Tier	Division	Place	Magyar Kupa
2007–08	3	NB II Délnyugat	1st	
2008–09	2	NB I/B Kelet	1st	Fourth place
2009–10	1	NB I	9th	
2010–11	1	NB I	Third place	Round 5

- As FTC-PLER Budapest

Season	Tier	Division	Place	Magyar Kupa
2011–12	1	NB I	7th	
2012–13	1	NB I	5th	

- As Ferencvárosi TC

Season	Tier	Division	Place	Magyar Kupa
2013–14	2	NB I/B Kelet	4th	
2014–15	2	NB I/B Kelet	3rd	
2015–16	2	NB I/B Kelet	2nd	Round 3
2016–17	2	NB I/B Kelet	1st	Round 5
2017–18	1	NB I	12th	Round 3
2018–19	1	NB I	7th	Round 5
2019–20	1	NB I	Cancelled due COVID-19	
2020–21	1	NB I	6th	Round 5
2021–22	1	NB I	4th	Round 5
2022–23	1	NB I	4th	Round 4
2023–24	1	NB I	4th	Round 5
2024–25	1	NB I	Third place	Round 5
2025–26	1	NB I	4th	Round 4

=== European competition ===
EHF Cup Winners' Cup: from the 2012–13 season, the men's competition was merged with the EHF Cup.
EHF Cup: It was formerly known as the IHF Cup until 1993. Also, starting from the 2012–13 season the competition has been merged with the EHF Cup Winners' Cup. The competition will be known as the EHF European League from the 2020–21 season.

Competition	Round	Club	Home	Away	Aggregate
2009–10 EHF Cup Winners' Cup	Third round	(Slovenia) RK Koper	29–34	22–28	51–62
2022–23 EHF European League	First qualifying round	(Romania) CS Minaur Baia Mare	38–22	36–27	74–49
2022–23 EHF European League	Second qualifying round	(Romania) CSA Steaua București	35–31	31–33	66–64
2022–23 EHF European League	Group stage (Group B)	(France) PAUC Handball	28–25	30–33	4th
2022–23 EHF European League	Group stage (Group B)	(Sweden) Ystads IF	37–34	35–35	4th
2022–23 EHF European League	Group stage (Group B)	(Iceland) Valur	33–33	39–43	4th
2022–23 EHF European League	Group stage (Group B)	(Germany) SG Flensburg-Handewitt	27–27	30–42	4th
2022–23 EHF European League	Group stage (Group B)	(Spain) BM Benidorm	32–33	27–23	4th
2022–23 EHF European League	1/16	(France) Montpellier HB	30–36	29–43	59–79
2023–24 EHF European Cup	R2	(Cyprus) Parnassos Strovolou	44–25	40–22	84–47
2023–24 EHF European Cup	R3	(Switzerland) BSV Bern	33–24	29–33	62–57
2023–24 EHF European Cup	Round of 16	(Turkey) Beşiktaş JK	39–36	34–32	73–68
2023–24 EHF European Cup	Quarterfinals	(Slovakia) HT Tatran Prešov	32–29	31–28	63–57
2023–24 EHF European Cup	Semifinals	(Greece) Olympiacos	28–28	32–39	60–67
2024–25 EHF European League	Qualification round	(Denmark) Bjerringbro-Silkeborg Håndbold	34–32	27–45	61–77
2025–26 EHF European League
2025–26 EHF European League	Group stage (Group E)	(Sweden) HF Karlskrona	31–29	32–31	3rd
2025–26 EHF European League	Group stage (Group E)	(Portugal) S.L. Benfica	33–31	25–38	3rd
2025–26 EHF European League	Group stage (Group E)	(Germany) MT Melsungen	25–28	27–33	3rd

Season	Competition	Round	Club	Home	Away	Aggregate
2025–26	EHF European League	Group stage (Group E)	(Sweden) HF Karlskrona	31–29	32–31	3th
2025–26	EHF European League	Group stage (Group E)	(Portugal) S.L. Benfica	33–31	25–38	3th
2025–26	EHF European League	Group stage (Group E)	(Germany) MT Melsungen	25–28	27–33	3th

==== European record ====
As of 25 March 2026:

Competition	Seasons	Year(s) in the competition
EHF European League	3x	2022/23, 2024/25, 2025/26
EHF European Cup	1x	2023/24
EHF Cup Winners' Cup (defunct)	1x	2009/10
Source: kézitörténelem.hu	5 seasons	

Statistics: matches played: 36 – wins: 17 – draws: 4 – losses: 15 – goals scored: 1144 – goals conceded: 1145

==== Overall results by opponent and country ====
As of 25 March 2026:

Country	Club	P	W	D	L	GF	GA	GD
Cyprus	Parnassos Strovolou	2	2	0	0	84	47	37
Subtotal		2	2	0	0	84	47	37
Denmark	Bjerringbro-Silkeborg Håndbold	2	1	0	1	61	77	-16
Subtotal		2	1	0	1	61	77	-16
France	Montpellier HB	2	0	0	2	59	79	-20
France	PAUC Handball	2	1	0	1	58	58	0
Subtotal		4	1	0	3	117	137	-20
Germany	MT Melsungen	2	0	0	2	52	61	-9
Germany	SG Flensburg-Handewitt	2	0	1	1	57	69	-12
Subtotal		4	0	1	3	109	130	-21
Greece	Olympiacos	2	0	1	1	60	67	-7
Subtotal		2	0	1	1	60	67	-7
Iceland	Valur	2	0	1	1	72	76	-4
Subtotal		2	0	1	1	72	76	-4
Portugal	S.L. Benfica	2	1	0	1	58	69	−11
Subtotal		2	1	0	1	58	69	-11
Romania	CS Minaur Baia Mare	2	2	0	0	74	49	25
Romania	CSA Steaua București	2	1	0	1	66	64	2
Subtotal		4	3	0	1	140	113	27
Slovakia	HT Tatran Prešov	2	2	0	0	63	57	6
Subtotal		2	2	0	0	63	57	6
Slovenia	RK Koper	2	0	0	2	51	62	−11
Subtotal		2	0	0	2	51	62	-11
Spain	BM Benidorm	2	1	0	1	59	56	3
Subtotal		2	1	0	1	59	56	3
Sweden	HF Karlskrona	2	2	0	0	63	60	3
Sweden	Ystads IF	2	1	1	0	72	69	3
Subtotal		4	3	1	0	135	129	6
Switzerland	BSV Bern	2	1	0	1	62	57	5
Subtotal		2	1	0	1	62	57	5
Turkey	Beşiktaş J.K.	2	2	0	0	73	68	5
Subtotal		2	2	0	0	73	68	5
		P	W	D	L	GF	GA	GD
Total		36	17	4	15	1144	1145	-1

==== EHF ranking ====
Last updated on 27/06/2026

Rank	Team	Points
47	(North Macedonia) RK Alkaloid	91
48	(Turkey) Beşiktaş JK	86
49	(Croatia) MRK Sesvete	85
50	(Hungary) Ferencvárosi TC	84
51	(Romania) CS Minaur Baia Mare	84
52	(Germany) Rhein-Neckar Löwen	83
53	(France) Saint-Raphaël Var Handball	82

== Records ==
=== Most appearances in international cups ===
Last updated on 27/06/2026

Rank	Name	Apps	Goals
1	(Hungary) Dávid Debreczeni	34	96
2	(Hungary) Bence Nagy	33	189
3	(Hungary) Ádám Borbély	32	1
4	(Hungary) Dániel Füzi	30	69
4	(Hungary) Kristóf Győri	30	1
5	(Hungary) Bendegúz Bujdosó	29	86
6	(Hungary) Péter Kovacsics	28	63
7	(Hungary) Kristóf Csörgő	27	49
8	(Hungary) Viktor Prainer	24	44
8	(Slovakia) Jakub Mikita	24	24
9	(Hungary) Alex Bognár	23	89
9	(Hungary) Zsolt Balogh	23	66
10	(Hungary) Máté Lékai	20	60

=== Most goals in international cups ===
Last updated on 27/06/2026

Rank	Name	Apps	Goals
1	(Hungary) Bence Nagy	33	189
2	(Hungary) Dávid Debreczeni	34	96
3	(Hungary) Alex Bognár	23	89
4	(Hungary) Bendegúz Bujdosó	29	86
5	(Hungary) Dániel Füzi	30	69
6	(Hungary) Zsolt Balogh	23	66
7	(Hungary) Bence Imre	19	64
8	(Hungary) Péter Kovacsics	28	63
9	(Hungary) Máté Lékai	20	60
10	(Hungary) Máté Ónodi-Jánoskúti	17	49
10	(Hungary) Kristóf Csörgő	27	49

== Former club members ==
=== Notable former players ===
Criteria

To appear in this section a player must have either:

- Played at least one official international match for their national team at any time.
- Or spent at least 10 years with the team.

==== Goalkeepers ====
- (Hungary) Ádám Borbély (2022–2026)
- (Hungary) Levente Nagy (2016–2018)
- (Hungary) Zsolt Perger (2009–2011)
- (Hungary) László Szabó (1957–1968)
- (Montenegro) Rade Mijatović (2018–2019)
- (Slovakia) Marián Žernovič (2017–2022)

==== Right wingers ====
- (Hungary) Bendegúz Bujdosó (2016–)
- (Hungary) Bence Imre (2013–2024)
- (Hungary) Ádám Tóth (2024–2025)

==== Left wingers ====
- (Hungary) György Bakos
- (Hungary) Sándor Bohács (2019–2023)
- (Hungary) Péter Kovacsics (2018–)
- (Hungary) Gábor Pálos (2016–2019)

==== Line players ====
- (Hungary) Miklós Karai (2013–2020, 2023–2026)
- (Hungary) Timuzsin Schuch (2018–2021)

==== Left backs ====
- (Hungary) Gábor Grebenár (2017–2018)
- (Hungary) Mátyás Győri (2024–2026)
- (Hungary) Bence Nagy (2019–)
- (Bosnia and Herzegovina) Marinko Kelečević (2010–2011)
- (Georgia (country)) Teimuraz Orjonikidze
- (Slovakia) Jakub Mikita

==== Central backs ====
- (Hungary) Alex Bognár (2019–2024)
- (Hungary) Máté Lékai (2022–)
- (Hungary) Péter Lukács (2015–2020)
- (Montenegro) Božo Anđelić (2018–2022)
- (Slovakia) Marian Kleis

==== Right backs ====
- (Hungary) Gábor Ancsin (2018–2019, 2024–2026)
- (Hungary) Zsolt Balogh (2022–2024)
- (Hungary) Máté Ónodi-Jánoskúti (2012–2025)
- (Hungary) Péter Tóth (2025–)
- (Croatia) Igor Kos (2010–2011)
- (Serbia) Nikola Ivanović

=== Former coaches ===
Seasons	Coach	Country
2009	György Kiss	(Hungary)
2009–2011	Vladan Matić	(Serbia) (Hungary)
2011–2013	Gyula Zsiga, György Kiss	(Hungary)
2013–2017	Gábor Adorján	(Hungary)
2017–2022	Attila Horváth	(Hungary)
2022–2026	István Pásztor	(Hungary)
2026–	György Kiss	(Hungary)

== See also ==
- Ferencvárosi TC
