= Bence Imre =

Hungarian handball player (born 2002)

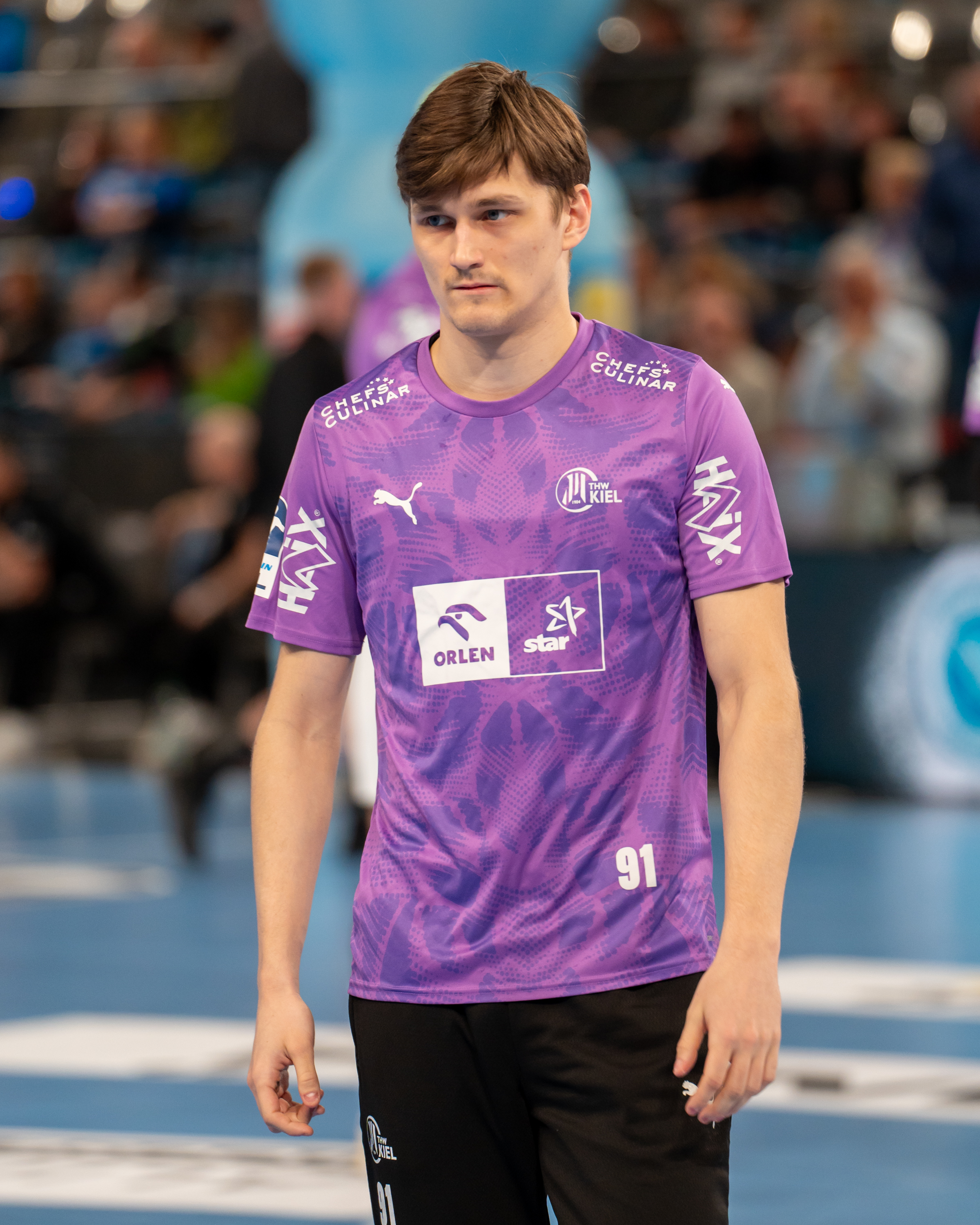
- Imre 2026

Personal information
- Nationality: Hungarian
- Born: 15 October 2002 (age 24) Budapest, Hungary
- Height: 1.85 m (6 ft 1 in)

Sport
- Sport: Handball
- Position: Right wing
- Current club: THW Kiel
- Number: 91

Youth career
- Years: Team
- 2013–2019: Ferencvárosi TC

Senior clubs
- Years: Team
- 2019–2024: Ferencvárosi TC
- 2024–2026: THW Kiel
- 2026–: ONE Veszprém
National team
Years	Team	Apps	(Gls)
2023–	Hungary	47	(230)
Medal record
Junior World Championship
Silver medal – second place	2023 Germany/Greece

Bence Imre (born 15 October 2002) is a Hungarian handball player for THW Kiel and the Hungary national team.

== Career ==
=== Club ===
Bence has been playing for Ferencvárosi TC since 2013, but of course he was connected to the association even before that through his mother, club legend Beatrix Kökény. In the 2018/19 season, he made his debut in the Nemzeti Bajnokság I at the age of sixteen, and of course, he has been a member of the senior team since then. In the 2022/23 season, he finished fourth in the league with our team, and was also there in the round of 16 of the EHF European League. He scored 19 goals in 16 matches in the EHF European League. He was signed by the German star club THW Kiel in the summer of 2024. In December 2025, it was announced that he would return to Hungary in the summer of 2026 and continue his career with the ONE Veszprém team.

=== National team ===
He was 9th with the Hungarian team at the 2021 Youth European Championship. As a member of the junior national team, he participated in the 2022 Junior European Championship where the Hungarian team became the 5th. At the age of 20, on 27 April 2023, he made his debut in the senior national team in Klaipėda in the Lithuania-Hungary men's European qualifying match 31-46 (he scored 9 goals). He participated in the 2023 Junior World Championship, where Hungary won the silver medal. He also participated in the 2024 European Men's Handball Championship as a member of the Hungary men's national handball team. (5th place, 6 matches / 20 goals). He also participated in the 2024 Paris Olympics, where the Hungarian team finished 10th (4 matches / 26 goals). He also participated in the 2025 World Men's Handball Championship as a member of the Hungary men's national handball team. (8th place, 7 matches / 28 goals). He also participated in the 2026 European Men's Handball Championship as a member of the Hungary men's national handball team. (10th place, 7 games / 46 goals).

== Personal life ==
His father is Géza Imre, an Olympic silver and bronze medalist fencer. His mother, Beatrix Kökény, is a former Hungarian handball player, European champion and multiple Olympic medalist, and is currently the technical director of Ferencvárosi TC. His sister Szofi Imre also plays handball, she is a goalkeeper.

== Honours ==
=== National team ===
- Junior World Championship:
  - Silver: 2023

=== Club ===
THW Kiel

- DHB-Pokal
  - Gold: 2025
- EHF European League
  - Silver: 2026
  - Bronze: 2025

ONE Veszprém

- Hungarian Supercup
  - Gold: 2026

=== Individual ===
- Hungarian Handballer of the Year: 2024
