= Alex Bognár =

Hungarian handball player (born 2000)

Personal information
- Nationality: Hungarian
- Born: 25 September 2000 (age 26) Budapest, Hungary
- Height: 1.88 m (6 ft 2 in)

Sport
- Sport: Handball
- Position: Central Back
- Current club: RK Celje
- Number: 7

Youth career
- Years: Team
- 2014–2015: (Hungary) Csanádi KSI SE
- 2015–2017: (Hungary) Rév TSC

Senior clubs
- Years: Team
- 2017–2019: (Hungary) Váci KSE
- 2019–2024: (Hungary) Ferencvárosi TC
- 2024–2026: (Slovenia) RK Celje
- 2026–: (Hungary) Győri ETO-UNI FKC

Alex Bognár (born 25 September 2000) is a Hungarian handball player who plays for RK Celje.

== Career ==
=== Club ===
Alex started his career in Csanádi KSI SE. In 2015, he transferred to the Rév TSC team, from where he was transferred to Váci KSE in January 2017. He made his debut in Nemzeti Bajnokság I in November 2017. In the 2017/18 season, he scored 3 goals in 16 matches. He signed a contract with Ferencvárosi TC in December 2019. In the 2019–2020 season, he scored 40 goals in 11 games for Váci KSE. In the 2022/23 season, he reached fourth place in the league and reached the EHF European League round of 16 with the team. He scored 46 goals in 15 matches in the EHF European League. In February 2024, the Slovenian RK Celje announced that Alex would join their team for 3 years from the summer. In 2026, he won the Slovenian Cup with the team. In the spring of 2026, it was announced that he would return to Hungary and continue his career with the Győri ETO-UNI FKC team.

=== National team ===
He was 10th with the Hungarian team at the 2018 Youth European Championship. He was 5th with the Hungarian team at the 2019 World Youth Championship.

== Honours ==
=== Club ===
RK Celje

- Slovenian First League
  - Gold: 2026
- Slovenian Cup
  - Gold: 2026

=== Individual ===
- Hungarian Youth Handballer of the Year: 2019
