= Božo Anđelić =

Montenegrin handball player (born 1992)

Personal information
- Nationality: Montenegrin
- Born: 16 March 1992 (age 34) Cetinje, SR Montenegro, Yugoslavia
- Height: 1.86 m (6 ft 1 in)

Sport
- Sport: Handball
- Position: Centre back
- Current club: RK Lovćen

Senior clubs
- Years: Team
- –: RK Crvena zvezda
- –2015: HK Malmö
- 2015–2017: Ceglédi KKSE
- 2017: RK Metalurg Skopje
- 2018–2022: Ferencvárosi TC
- 2022: HC Motor Zaporizhzhia
- 2023: Al-Qurain
- 2023–2024: PLER-Budapest
- 2024: Maccabi Tel Aviv
- 2025: HC Meshkov Brest
- 2026–: RK Lovćen
National team
Years	Team	Apps	(Gls)
–	Montenegro	56	(90)

Božo Anđelić (born 16 March 1992) is a Montenegrin handball player for RK Lovćen and the Montenegrin national team.
