= Petar Terzić =

Austrian soldier and nobleman

General Petar Terzić also spelled Peter Tersich von Cadesich(Serbian: Генерал Петар Терзић; 1739 – 22 December 1806) was an Austrian nobleman, major general who fought in both the Ottoman and Napoleonic wars.

== Biography ==
Petar Terzić was born in 1739 in Kovilj in Slavonia, Habsburg monarchy, the part of the Military Frontier of the ever-present conflict between the forces of two empires from the early 1600s into the 1900s. Petar Terzić came from an old Serbian family with a military history dating back to time. In 1751 he became a cadet; in 1752, an ensign; and in 1753, lieutenant. As a graduate cadet of the Imperial-Royal Army in the Habsburg Monarchy, he rose through the military ranks, in 1765, he was promoted to captain; and by 1790, he was a colonel already.

In the Serbian Banat there were the occasional occurrence of depriving officers and frontier guardsmen of their rank. Terzić would always support the Serbian claim in military lawsuits when General Peter Duka came to adjudicate. Duka tried to mitigate the charges against General Terzić in Pančevo who openly supported the Serbs.

In 1804 when the First Serbian Uprising broke out Terzić's support went out to Karađorđe's Serbia It was Terzić who recorded the exact date of the start of the Serbian Revolution, "7 March 1804"

He was promoted to brigadier general in 1794 and on 21 August 1796 he received the rank of General Major He retired in 1807 and a year later died in Pančevo. He was 69.
