= Zsolt Balogh =

Hungarian handball player (born 1989)

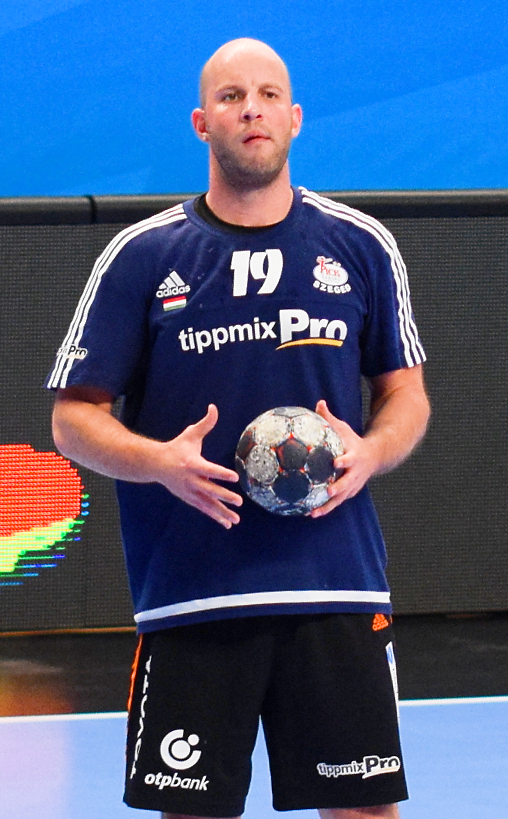

Personal information
- Nationality: Hungarian
- Born: 29 March 1989 (age 37) Orosháza, Hungary
- Height: 1.89 m (6 ft 2 in)

Sport
- Sport: Handball
- Position: Right back
- Current club: Ferencvárosi TC
- Number: 19

Senior clubs
- Years: Team
- –2005: Orosházi FKSE
- 2005–2010: PLER KC
- 2010–2011: SC Magdeburg
- 2011–2012: Gyöngyösi KK
- 2012–2019: SC Pick Szeged
- 2019–2022: Tatabánya KC
- 2022–2024: Ferencvárosi TC
- 2024–2025: Győri ETO-UNI FKC
National team
Years	Team	Apps	(Gls)
2008–	Hungary	70	(221)

Zsolt Balogh (born 29 March 1989) is a Hungarian handball player for Ferencvárosi TC and the Hungarian national team.

He represented Hungary at the 2019 World Men's Handball Championship.

== Career ==
He began his career in his hometown, Orosháza. He first played for PLER KC for five years and then played handball for the 2010–2011 season in the German Bundesliga, SC Magdeburg. He only played here for 1 season, after that he returned home to Hungary, to the Gyöngyösi KK. Following the Gyöngyös detour, he was certified in SC Pick Szeged in 2012. In 2014, he was a member of the EHF Cup winning team, which won the cup against the French Montpellier Handball in the Berlin final. In the spring of 2018, he won a Hungarian championship after several silver medals with his team, defeating the biggest rival Telekom Veszprém. Over the years, he has become the most successful player in the history of the Szeged club, 300. He scored the EHF Champions League goal on 14 October 2018, in the winning match against the German champion SG Flensburg-Handewitt. In February 2019, it became official that he would continue his career in the Grundfos Tatabánya KC team from next season. In his last year in Szeged he won the Hungarian Cup with his team.

== Individual awards ==
- Hungarian Junior Handballer of the Year: 2008
