= Miloš Terzić (politician) =

Serbian politician

Miloš Terzić (Serbian Cyrillic: Милош Терзић; born 14 February 1988) is a politician in Serbia. He was elected to the National Assembly of Serbia in the 2020 parliamentary election as a member of the Serbian Progressive Party.

== Early life and career ==
Terzić was born in Belgrade, in what was then the Socialist Republic of Serbia in the Socialist Federal Republic of Yugoslavia. He holds a Bachelor of Laws degree and a master's degree in political science. He works for the public company Vodovod i kanalizacija Grocka and has been assistant to the president of the municipality of Grocka. Terzić was also a leading author of the Strategy for the Development of Sports in Grocka (2014–16).

== Politician ==
Terzić joined the Progressive Party in 2014 and has been active with the party's organization in Grocka. He received the thirty-seventh position on the party's electoral list in the 2020 Serbian parliamentary election and was elected when the list won a landslide majority with 188 mandates. He is a member of the committee on Kosovo-Metohija and the culture and information committee, a deputy member of the committee on constitutional and legislative issues and the committee on the diaspora and Serbs in the region, a member of the European Union–Serbia stabilization and association committee, the head of Serbia's parliamentary friendship group with Syria, and a member of the parliamentary friendship groups with Armenia, the Bahamas, Bosnia and Herzegovina, Botswana, Bulgaria, Cameroon, the Central African Republic, China, Comoros, the Dominican Republic, Ecuador, Equatorial Guinea, Eritrea, Greece, Grenada, Guinea-Bissau, Hungary, Israel, Jamaica, Kazakhstan, Kyrgyzstan, Laos, Liberia, Madagascar, Mali, Mauritius, Montenegro, Mozambique, Nauru, Nicaragua, Nigeria, North Macedonia, Norway, Palau, Papua New Guinea, Paraguay, the Republic of Congo, Russia, Saint Vincent and the Grenadines, Sao Tome and Principe, the Solomon Islands, South Sudan, Sri Lanka, Sudan, Suriname, Togo, Trinidad and Tobago, the United States of America, Uruguay, and Uzbekistan.
