= 2012–13 Nemzeti Bajnokság I (men's handball) =

Nemzeti Bajnokság I
- Season: 2012–13
- Country: Hungary

2012–13 Nemzeti Bajnokság I (men's handball) season.

== Team information ==
Location of teams in the 2012–13 Nemzeti Bajnokság I

Team	Location	Arena	Capacity
Balatonfüredi KSE	Balatonfüred	Balaton Szabadidő és Konferencia Központ	712
Ceglédi KKSE	Cegléd	Városi Sportcsarnok	1,200
Csurgói KK	Csurgó	Városi Sportcsarnok	800
Ferencvárosi TC	Budapest	Elek Gyula Aréna	1,300
Gyöngyösi KK	Gyöngyös	Városi Sportcsarnok	1,100
Kecskemét SE	Kecskemét	Messzi István Sportcsarnok	1,200
Orosházi FKSE	Orosháza	Városi Sportcsarnok	600
Pécsi VSE	Pécs	Lauber Dezső Sportcsarnok	3,000
Pick Szeged	Szeged	Városi Sportcsarnok	3,200
Tatabánya KC	Tatabánya	Földi Imre Sportcsarnok	1,000
Váci KSE	Vác	Városi Sportcsarnok	800
Veszprém	Veszprém	Veszprém Aréna	5,096

== Regular season ==
=== Standings ===
	Team	Pld	W	D	L	Pts
1	MKB Veszprém	20	19	0	1	38
2	Pick Szeged	20	18	1	1	37
3	Csurgói KK	20	15	0	5	30
4	Tatabánya KC	20	10	2	8	22
5	Ferencvárosi TC	20	8	2	10	16
6	Gyöngyösi KK	20	6	4	10	16
7	Balatonfüredi KSE	20	7	1	12	15
8	Váci KSE	20	7	0	13	14
9	Pécsi VSE	20	5	1	14	11
10	Ceglédi KKSE	20	5	0	15	10
11	Orosházi FKSE	20	4	1	15	9
12	Kecskemét SE	0	0	0	0	0

Champion Playoff
Relegation Round

Pld - Played; W - Won; L - Lost; PF - Points for; PA - Points against; Diff - Difference; Pts - Points.

== Relegation round ==
	Team	Pld	W	D	L	Pts
7	Balatonfüredi KSE	16	12	1	3	25
8	Váci KSE	16	8	0	8	16
9	Orosházi FKSE	16	6	3	7	15
10	Ceglédi KKSE	16	7	1	8	15
11	Pécsi VSE	16	4	1	11	9
12	Kecskemét SE	0	0	0	0	0
