= Elek Gyula Aréna =

Multi-purpose indoor arena in Budapest, Hungary

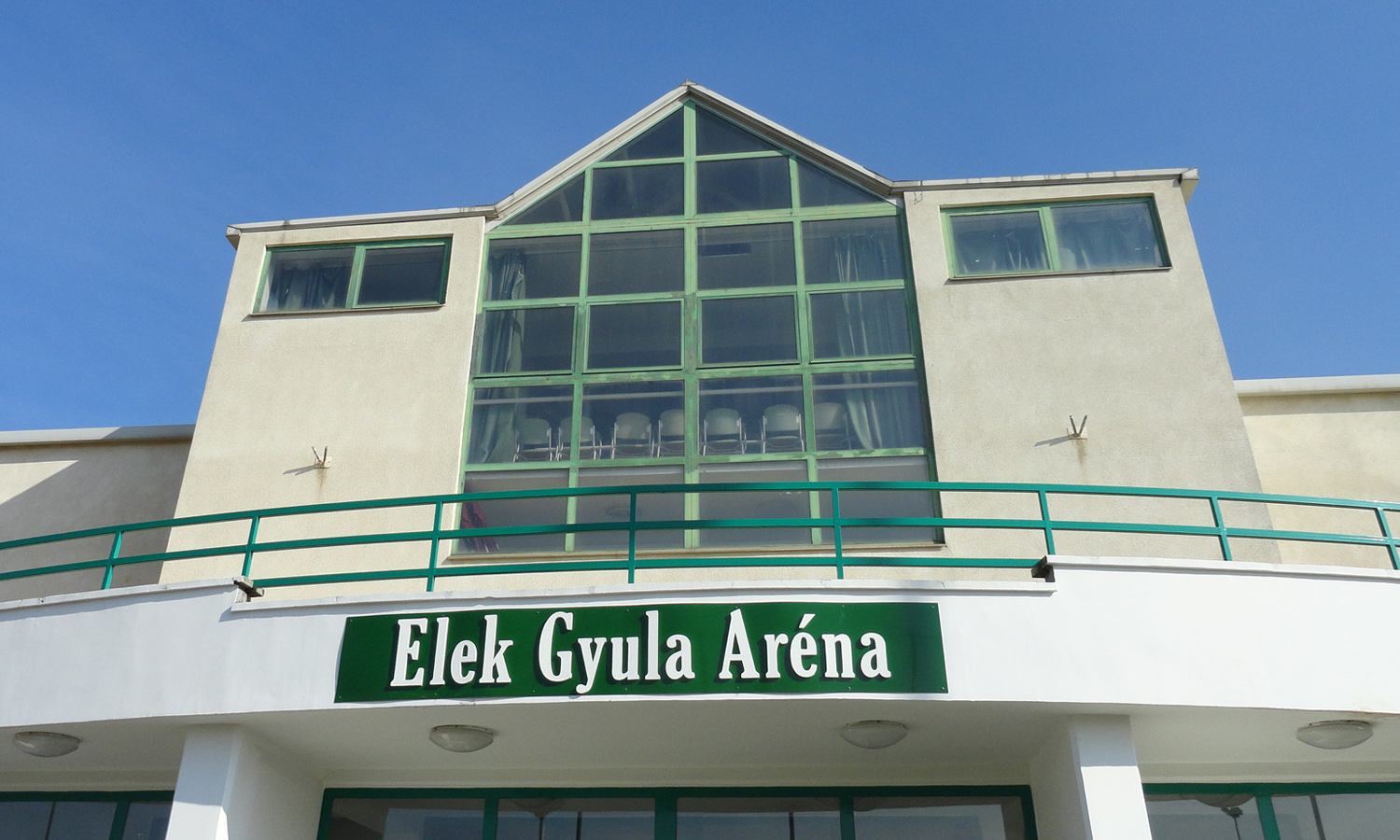
- Interactive map of Elek Gyula Aréna
- Full name: Elek Gyula Aréna
- Former names: Főtáv-FTC Kézilabda Aréna
- Location: Budapest, Hungary
- Coordinates: 47.4825°N 19.1178°E
- Owner: Nemzeti Sportközpontok
- Capacity: 1,300

Construction
- Opened: 1997
- Renovated: 2016

Tenant
- Ferencvárosi TC

Elek Gyula Aréna in a multi-purpose indoor arena in Budapest, Hungary.

The arena was opened in 1997 and renovated in 2016. Sports played include basketball, handball, and volleyball.
