= 2024–25 Nemzeti Bajnokság I (men's handball) =

Nemzeti Bajnokság I
- Season: 2024–25
- Dates: 31 August 2024 – 29 May 2025
- Champion: ONE Veszprém; 29th title
- Relegated: Dabas KC; Eger
- Champions League: ONE Veszprém; OTP Bank-Pick Szeged
- European League: FTC-Green Collect; MOL Tatabánya KC
- Matches played: 185
- Top goalscorer: Tamás Kovács

The 2024–25 Nemzeti Bajnokság I (known as the K&H férfi kézilabda liga for sponsorship reasons) was the 74th season of the Nemzeti Bajnokság I, the top men's handball league in Hungary. A total of fourteen teams contest this season's league, which began on 31 August 2024 and concluded on 8 June 2025.

Telekom Veszprém won their twenty-eighth title.

== Teams ==
=== Team changes ===
Promoted from 2023–24 Nemzeti Bajnokság I/B	Relegated from 2023–24 Nemzeti Bajnokság I
Győri ETO-UNI FKC	Fejér B.Á.L. Veszprém

=== Arenas and locations ===
Location of teams in 2024–25 Nemzeti Bajnokság I

The following 14 clubs competed in the Nemzeti Bajnokság I during the 2024–25 season:

Team	Location	Arena	Capacity
Balatonfüredi KSE	Balatonfüred	Szabadidőközpont	712
Budakalász FKC	Budakalász	Városi Sportcsarnok	400
Csurgói KK	Csurgó	Sótonyi László Sportcsarnok	1,200
Dabas KC	Dabas	OBO Aréna	1,920
Eger-Eszterházy SzSE	Eger	Kemény Ferenc Sportcsarnok	885
Ferencvárosi TC	Budapest (Ferencváros)	Elek Gyula Aréna	1,300
Gyöngyösi KK	Gyöngyös	Dr. Fejes András Sportcsarnok	1,100
Győri ETO-UNI FKC	Győr	Magvassy Mihály Sportcsarnok	2,800
Komlói BSK	Komló	Sportközpont	800
NEKA	Balatonboglár	NEKA Csarnok	678
PLER-Budapest	Budapest (Pestszentlőrinc)	BUD Aréna	1,000
SC Pick Szeged	Szeged	Pick Aréna	8,143
Tatabánya KC	Tatabánya	Tatabányai Multifunkcionális Sportcsarnok	6,200
Veszprém KC	Veszprém	Veszprém Aréna	5,096

==== Number of teams by counties and regions ====
Number of teams by counties
Pos.	County	No. of teams	Teams
1	Budapest	2	Ferencvárosi TC and PLER
1	Heves	2	Eger-Eszterházy SzSE and Gyöngyösi KK
1	Pest	2	Budakalász FKC and Dabas KK
1	Somogy	2	Csurgói KK and NEKA
1	Veszprém	2	Balatonfüredi KSE and Veszprém KC
6	Baranya	1	Komlói BSK
6	Csongrád-Csanád	1	SC Pick Szeged
6	Győr-Moson-Sopron	1	Győri ETO-UNI FKC
6	Komárom-Esztergom	1	Tatabánya KC

Number of teams by regions
Transdanubia	Central Hungary	Great Plain and North
Balatonfüred; Csurgói KK; Győri ETO-UNI FKC; Komlói BSK; NEKA; Tatabánya KC; Veszprém KC	Budakalász FKC; Dabas KK; Ferencvárosi TC; PLER-Budapest	Eger-Eszterházy SzSE; Gyöngyösi KK; SC Pick Szeged
7 Teams	4 Teams	3 Teams

=== Personnel and kits ===
Hungarian national sports betting brand Tippmix sponsored all 14 teams of the first league since February 2019, their logo were present on all team kits.

Team	Head coach	Captain	Kit maker	Kit sponsors	
Team	Head coach	Captain	Kit maker	Main	Other(s)
Balatonfüredi KSE	(Hungary) Ákos Kis	(Hungary) Bendegúz Bóka	2Rule	MBH Bank, Sennebogen, Vémévszer	List: Front: City of Balatonfüred; Back: ZÁÉV; Sleeves: PROBIO
Budakalász FKC	(Hungary) István Csoknyai	(Hungary) Dániel Váczi	Hummel	Cyeb Energiakereskedő	List: Shorts: Swietelsky
Csurgói KK	(Serbia) Alem Toskić	(Hungary) Erik Szeitl	Kappa	PriMont, Dráva-Coop, KLH Masters	List: Back: Le Primore Hotel & Spa; Shorts: PriMont, KLH Masters
Dabas KC	(Hungary) Győző Tomori	(Hungary) Szabolcs Szöllősi	Erima	None	List: Front: OBO Bettermann, Volvo Galéria; Back: City of Dabas
Eger-Eszterházy SzSE	(Hungary) Edmond Tóth	(Hungary) Gergő Kiss	Erima	None	None
Ferencvárosi TC	(Hungary) István Pásztor	(Hungary) Dávid Debreczeni	Macron	Green Collect	List: Shorts: MVM
Gyöngyösi KK	(Hungary) Balázs Bíró	(Hungary) Márk Hegedűs	Hummel	B. Braun, HE-DO	List: Front: Kedvenc Kereskedőház, K&V; Back: City of Gyöngyös; Shorts: Crossgym Gemmeopolis, Gyöngyösi Egészségügyi Centrum
Győri ETO-UNI FKC	(Hungary) Bálint Kilvinger		Mizuno	Széchenyi István University	List: Front: MIB Invest Group, EndoPlus Service, City of Győr; Back: Agrofeed, WHB Győr; Shorts: Győrszol, In-Food 2000
Komlói BSK	(Hungary) László György	(Hungary) Pál Merkovszki	Jako	Carbonex	List: Front: AutóCity Cupra; Sleeves: Ambient Hotel & AromaSpa
NEKA	(Hungary) László Sótonyi	(Hungary) Márton Dely	Hummel	None	List: Back: ALEF
PLER-Budapest	(Hungary) Sándor Lepsényi	(Hungary) János Dénes	Craft	Budapest Spas	List: Back: Városgazda18; Sleeves: Príma; Shorts: AutoPalace Dél-Pest
SC Pick Szeged	(Sweden) Michael Apelgren	(Hungary) Bence Bánhidi	Hummel	Pick, OTP Bank	List: Front: SMP Solutions, merkantil lízing; Back: Groupama and Lexus Szeged; Sleeves: Mizo; Shorts: Groupama and Lexus Szeged
Tatabánya KC	(Spain) Cristian Ugalde	(Hungary) Márton Székely	Jako	MOL	List: Back: Grundfos; Sleeves: Foxconn, VITA Sütöipari Kft.; Shorts: VölgységAgrár
Veszprém KC	(Spain) Xavier Pascual	(Slovenia) Gašper Marguč	2Rule	One	List: Front: MBH Bank, City of Veszprém; Back: Duna Aszfalt, Vémévszer; Sleeves: OMV; Shorts: Cupra

== Regular season ==
=== League table ===
Pos	Team	Pld	W	D	L	GF	GA	GD	Pts	Qualification or relegation
1	ONE Veszprém HC	26	25	0	1	1032	688	+344	50	Qualification to the Finals and advance for the Champions League
2	OTP Bank-Pick Szeged	26	22	0	4	945	749	+196	44	Qualification to the Finals and advance for the Champions League
3	FTC-Green Collect	26	19	1	6	897	827	+70	39	Qualification for the European League group stage
4	MOL Tatabánya KC	26	16	2	8	842	801	+41	34	Qualification for the European Cup second qualifying round
5	Balatonfüredi KSE	26	12	7	7	766	773	−7	31	Qualification for the European Cup first qualifying round
6	Győri ETO-UNI FKC	26	13	2	11	819	803	+16	28	
7	Csurgói KK	26	10	5	11	739	765	−26	25	
8	HE-DO B. Braun Gyöngyös	26	9	4	13	744	807	−63	22	
9	Carbonex-Komló	26	7	5	14	692	773	−81	19	
10	PLER-Budapest	26	7	3	16	738	819	−81	17	
11	HSA NEKA	26	7	2	17	748	838	−90	16	
12	CYEB-Budakalász	26	7	1	18	721	797	−76	15	
13	Dabas KC (R)	26	4	5	17	699	800	−101	13	Relegation to the Nemzeti Bajnokság I/B
14	Eger (R)	26	4	3	19	707	849	−142	11	Relegation to the Nemzeti Bajnokság I/B

Source: Hungarian Handball Federation (in Hungarian), Flashscore
Rules for classification: 1) Points; 2) Head-to-head points; 3) Head-to-head goal difference; 4) Goal difference; 5) Goals scored; 6) Matches won; 7) Draw (Note: Head-to-head record is used only after all the matches between the teams in question have been played)
(R) Relegated

=== Results ===
Home \ Away	BAL	BUD	CSU	DAB	EGE	FTC	GYÖ	ETO	KOM	NEK	PLE	SZE	TAT	VES
Balatonfüredi KSE	—	25–24	28–26	29–25	38–27	27–28	28–29	27–37	30–27	40–24	30–29	38–36	33–29	28–38
Budakalász FKC	29–30	—	32–31	27–26	31–23	25–27	33–26	30–28	26–26	25–28	29–31	27–37	34–41	22–38
Csurgói KK	30–30	26–22	—	34–27	26–25	29–29	28–22	26–22	31–26	29–27	27–27	32–27	28–37	29–40
Dabas KC	27–27	24–28	32–31	—	31–26	32–35	27–27	30–29	19–20	22–25	27–32	29–38	31–33	24–48
Eger	26–26	23–22	31–29	26–27	—	22–35	31–32	26–35	22–22	34–33	31–36	26–37	36–36	25–39
FTC-Green Collect	27–25	38–27	37–26	39–29	43–31	—	38–32	41–39	26–21	38–32	33–28	32–40	41–33	29–44
HE-DO B. Braun Gyöngyös	30–30	32–28	29–29	24–24	37–28	34–41	—	28–26	29–25	29–23	29–28	27–35	26–29	25–45
Győri ETO-UNI FKC	29–29	31–30	35–28	26–26	31–24	37–35	32–26	—	34–24	39–30	38–32	35–33	30–39	22–37
Carbonex-Komló	29–29	24–27	32–33	29–29	27–25	30–29	29–25	32–29	—	27–33	32–25	28–33	28–36	26–37
NEKA	29–32	33–32	23–23	28–24	29–25	33–36	34–37	22–28	25–26	—	25–28	26–36	36–28	29–38
PLER-Budapest	28–29	36–33	21–31	30–24	25–29	35–37	30–29	31–38	29–29	28–28	—	27–41	24–26	20–41
OTP Bank-Pick Szeged	37–28	34–24	42–26	35–27	41–23	48–37	35–27	38–29	38–27	43–33	35–24	—	33–27	28–24
MOL Tatabánya KC	26–26	34–28	31–28	32–28	34–31	34–37	31–28	35–27	37–21	39–33	34–28	30–32	—	21–38
ONE Veszprém HC	47–24	45–26	31–23	42–28	47–31	34–29	40–25	44–33	37–25	52–27	34–26	36–33	36–30	—

Source: Results (Hungarian Handball Federation) (in Hungarian)
Legend: Blue = home team win; Yellow = draw; Red = away team win.
For upcoming matches, an "a" indicates there is an article about the rivalry between the two participants.

== Finals ==
Team 1	Series	Team 2	Game 1	Game 2	Game 3
ONE Veszprém HC	2–1	OTP Bank-Pick Szeged	34–32	28–32	34–31

=== Game 1 ===
30 May 2025; 19:15	ONE Veszprém HC	34–32	OTP Bank-Pick Szeged	Veszprém Aréna, Veszprém; Attendance: 4,800; Referees: Bócz, Wiedemann
30 May 2025; 19:15	Descat 12	(14–16)	Smárason, Frimmel 7	Veszprém Aréna, Veszprém; Attendance: 4,800; Referees: Bócz, Wiedemann
30 May 2025; 19:15	3× (suspension)	Report	4× (suspension)	Veszprém Aréna, Veszprém; Attendance: 4,800; Referees: Bócz, Wiedemann

=== Game 2 ===
4 June 2025; 18:30	OTP Bank-Pick Szeged	32–28	ONE Veszprém HC	Pick Aréna, Szeged; Attendance: 7,087; Referees: Hargitai, Markó
4 June 2025; 18:30	Šoštarić 8	(15–12)	Fabregas 8	Pick Aréna, Szeged; Attendance: 7,087; Referees: Hargitai, Markó
4 June 2025; 18:30	1× (yellow card) 4× (suspension) 1× (red card)	Report	4× (suspension)	Pick Aréna, Szeged; Attendance: 7,087; Referees: Hargitai, Markó

=== Game 3 ===
8 June 2025; 17:45	ONE Veszprém HC	34–31	OTP Bank-Pick Szeged	Veszprém Aréna, Veszprém; Attendance: 4,900; Referees: Bíró, Kiss
8 June 2025; 17:45	Fabregas, Kosorotov 7	(17–15)	Šoštarić 7	Veszprém Aréna, Veszprém; Attendance: 4,900; Referees: Bíró, Kiss
8 June 2025; 17:45	4× (suspension)	Report	6× (suspension)	Veszprém Aréna, Veszprém; Attendance: 4,900; Referees: Bíró, Kiss

ONE Veszprém HC won the Finals, 2–1 on series.

2024–25 Nemzeti Bajnokság I
Champion

29th title

== Top goalscorers ==
Rank	Player	Club	Goals
1	(Hungary) Tamás Kovács	NEKA	144
2	(Slovenia) Gregor Ocvirk	PLER-Budapest	135
3	(Hungary) Zsolt Balogh	Győri ETO-UNI FKC	127
4	(Slovenia) Dean Bombač	Győri ETO-UNI FKC	124
5	(Russia) Sergei Kosorotov	ONE Veszprém HC	121
6	(Croatia) Srecko Jerkovic	Carbonex-Komló	119
7	(Slovenia) (Croatia) Mario Šoštarić	OTP Bank-Pick Szeged	118
8	(Hungary) Benjámin Szilágyi	OTP Bank-Pick Szeged	112
9	(Hungary) Ádám Juhász	Budakalász FKC	110
10	(Serbia) (Hungary) Stefan Sunajko	PLER-Budapest	109

== See also ==
- 2024–25 Magyar Kupa
- 2024–25 Nemzeti Bajnokság I/B
- 2024–25 Nemzeti Bajnokság II
