= 2022–23 Balatonfüredi KSE season =

Balatonfüredi KSE
2022–23 season
- President: János Eppel
- Head coach: (Hungary) László György
- Nemzeti Bajnokság I: 3rd
- Hungarian Cup: Pre-season
- EHF European League: Group stage
Home colours	Away colours
- All statistics correct as of 14 September 2022.

The 2022–23 season was the 32nd season in the history of Balatonfüredi KSE and their 16th consecutive season in the top flight. The club will participate in Nemzeti Bajnokság I, the Magyar Kupa and the EHF European League.

== Club ==
=== Management ===
Position	Staff member
President	János Eppel
Executive director	Tamás Bene
Sports director	Ákos Kis

=== Uniform ===
- Supplier: 2Rule
- Shirt sponsor (front): tippmix / 77 Elektronika / Takarékbank / City of Balatonfüred / Volkswagen
- Shirt sponsor (back): ZÁÉV
- Shorts sponsor: Sennebogen

== Competitions ==
Times up to 30 October 2022 and from 26 March 2023 are CEST (UTC+2). Times from 30 October 2022 to 26 March 2023 are CET (UTC+1).

Win Draw Loss

=== Overview ===
Competition	First match	Last match	Starting round	Final position	Record							
Competition	First match	Last match	Starting round	Final position	Pld	W	D	L	GF	GA	GD	Win %
Nemzeti Bajnokság I	31 August 2022	-	Matchday 1	-	2	0	1	1	48	59	−11	0.00
Magyar Kupa	-	-	Fourth round	-	0	0	0	0	0	0	+0	—
EHF European League	25 October 2022	-	Group stage	-	0	0	0	0	0	0	+0	—
Total					2	0	1	1	48	59	−11	0.00

Last updated: 11 September 2022
Source: Flashscore

=== Nemzeti Bajnokság I ===
==== Regular season ====
===== Results by round =====
Round	1	2	3	4	5	6	7	8	9	10	11	12	13	14	15	16	17	18	19	20	21	22	23	24	25	26
Ground	A	H	A	H	A	H	A	H	A	H	A	A	H	H	A	H	A	H	A	H	A	H	A	H	H	A
Result	L	D	L	W	D	W	W			W																

Updated to match(es) played on 15 September 2022. Source: Matches
A = Away; H = Home; W = Win; D = Draw; L = Loss; C = Cancelled

===== Matches =====
The league fixtures were announced on 5 July 2022.

Round 1; 31 August 2022; 17:45	Telekom Veszprém	35–24	Balatonfüredi KSE	Veszprém Aréna, Veszprém; Attendance: 800; Referees: Horváth, Marton
Round 1; 31 August 2022; 17:45	Vailupau 5	(21–12)	Sretenović 4	Veszprém Aréna, Veszprém; Attendance: 800; Referees: Horváth, Marton
Round 1; 31 August 2022; 17:45	1× (yellow card) 4× (suspension)	Report	2× (yellow card) 4× (suspension)	Veszprém Aréna, Veszprém; Attendance: 800; Referees: Horváth, Marton

Round 2; 9 September 2022; 18:00	Balatonfüredi KSE	24–24	HE-DO B. Braun Gyöngyös	Szabadidőközpont, Balatonfüred; Attendance: 400; Referees: Hargitai, Markó
Round 2; 9 September 2022; 18:00	Szöllősi 5	(11–10)	Bura 6	Szabadidőközpont, Balatonfüred; Attendance: 400; Referees: Hargitai, Markó
Round 2; 9 September 2022; 18:00	2× (yellow card) 5× (suspension)	Report	2× (yellow card) 7× (suspension)	Szabadidőközpont, Balatonfüred; Attendance: 400; Referees: Hargitai, Markó

Round 3; 17 September 2022; 19:00	Pick Szeged	37–28	Balatonfüredi KSE	Pick Aréna, Szeged; Attendance: 1,500; Referees: Fekete, Tóth
Round 3; 17 September 2022; 19:00	three players 6	(20–12)	Szmetán 6	Pick Aréna, Szeged; Attendance: 1,500; Referees: Fekete, Tóth
Round 3; 17 September 2022; 19:00	3× (suspension)	Report	1× (yellow card) 3× (suspension)	Pick Aréna, Szeged; Attendance: 1,500; Referees: Fekete, Tóth

Round 4; 24 September 2022; 18:00	Balatonfüredi KSE	33–27	Fejér-B.Á.L. Veszprém	Szabadidőközpont, Balatonfüred; Attendance: 500; Referees: Nagy, Túróczy
Round 4; 24 September 2022; 18:00	Szöllősi 10	(16–14)	Pulay 7	Szabadidőközpont, Balatonfüred; Attendance: 500; Referees: Nagy, Túróczy
Round 4; 24 September 2022; 18:00	2× (yellow card) 3× (suspension)	Report	2× (yellow card) 1× (red card)	Szabadidőközpont, Balatonfüred; Attendance: 500; Referees: Nagy, Túróczy

Round 5; 30 September 2022; 18:00	HSA-NEKA	23–23	Balatonfüredi KSE	NEKA Sportcsarnok, Balatonboglár; Attendance: 200; Referees: Bíró, Kiss
Round 5; 30 September 2022; 18:00	Kovács 6	(11–11)	Vajda 6	NEKA Sportcsarnok, Balatonboglár; Attendance: 200; Referees: Bíró, Kiss
Round 5; 30 September 2022; 18:00	1× (yellow card) 7× (suspension)	Report	3× (suspension)	NEKA Sportcsarnok, Balatonboglár; Attendance: 200; Referees: Bíró, Kiss

Round 6; 20 October 2022; 18:00	Balatonfüredi KSE	35–28	Budai Farkasok-Rév Group	Szabadidőközpont, Balatonfüred; Attendance: 300; Referees: Sándor, Szabó
Round 6; 20 October 2022; 18:00	Bóka, Szöllősi 7	(17–12)	Auer 5	Szabadidőközpont, Balatonfüred; Attendance: 300; Referees: Sándor, Szabó
Round 6; 20 October 2022; 18:00	1× (yellow card) 5× (suspension) 1× (red card)	Report	1× (yellow card) 5× (suspension)	Szabadidőközpont, Balatonfüred; Attendance: 300; Referees: Sándor, Szabó

Round 7; 29 October 2022; 18:00	Csurgói KK	26–37	Balatonfüredi KSE	Sótonyi László Sportcsarnok, Csurgó; Attendance: 800; Referees: Hargita, Markó
Round 7; 29 October 2022; 18:00	Krsmančić 6	(10–17)	Sretenović 9	Sótonyi László Sportcsarnok, Csurgó; Attendance: 800; Referees: Hargita, Markó
Round 7; 29 October 2022; 18:00	3× (yellow card) 3× (suspension)	Report	1× (yellow card) 6× (suspension) 1× (red card)	Sótonyi László Sportcsarnok, Csurgó; Attendance: 800; Referees: Hargita, Markó

Round 8; 6 November 2022; 18:00	Balatonfüredi KSE	–	Sport36-Komló	Szabadidőközpont, Balatonfüred
Round 8; 6 November 2022; 18:00		(–)		Szabadidőközpont, Balatonfüred
Round 8; 6 November 2022; 18:00		Report		Szabadidőközpont, Balatonfüred

Round 9; 12 November 2022; 17:00	CYEB-Budakalász	–	Balatonfüredi KSE	Sportcsarnok, Budakalász; Referees: G. Kiu, T. Kiu
Round 9; 12 November 2022; 17:00		(–)		Sportcsarnok, Budakalász; Referees: G. Kiu, T. Kiu
Round 9; 12 November 2022; 17:00		Report		Sportcsarnok, Budakalász; Referees: G. Kiu, T. Kiu

Round 10; 6 October 2022; 18:00	Balatonfüredi KSE	26–19	HÉP-Cegléd	Szabadidőközpont, Balatonfüred; Attendance: 300; Referees: Andorka, Hucker
Round 10; 6 October 2022; 18:00	Szöllősi 7	(13–10)	Hajdú 6	Szabadidőközpont, Balatonfüred; Attendance: 300; Referees: Andorka, Hucker
Round 10; 6 October 2022; 18:00	1× (yellow card) 6× (suspension)	Report	1× (yellow card) 1× (suspension)	Szabadidőközpont, Balatonfüred; Attendance: 300; Referees: Andorka, Hucker

===== Results overview =====
Opposition	Home score	Away score	Double
Budai Farkasok-Rév Group	35–28	15 Apr	-
CYEB-Budakalász	22 Apr	12 Nov	-
HÉP-Cegléd	26–19	5 May	-
Csurgói KK	17 Mar	26–37	-
Dabas KK	20 may	19 Nov	-
Ferencvárosi TC	18 Dec	27 May	-
HE-DO B. Braun Gyöngyös	24–24	18 Feb	-
Sport36-Komló	6 Nov	25 Mar	-
HSA-NEKA	19 Mar	23–23	-
Pick Szeged	25 Feb	37–28	-
MOL Tatabánya KC	13 May	2 Dec	-
Telekom Veszprém	11 Feb	35–24	-
Fejér-B.Á.L. Veszprém	33–27	4 Mar	-

=== Magyar Kupa ===
Balatonfüred entered the tournament in the fourth round.

=== EHF European League ===
The draw was held on 6 October 2022 in Vienna, Austria.

Pos	Team	Pld	W	D	L	GF	GA	GD	Pts	Qualification	NEX	SPO	GRA	SKJ	ALP	BAL
1	(Croatia) RK Nexe	10	8	0	2	311	281	+30	16	Knockout stage	—	32–31	39–36	29–28	22–29	37–23
2	(Portugal) Sporting CP	10	7	0	3	312	294	+18	14	Knockout stage	28–34	—	38–31	28–24	31–30	35–32
3	(Spain) Fraikin BM Granollers	10	6	1	3	315	301	+14	13	Knockout stage	25–22	32–29	—	34–31	38–28	33–30
4	(Denmark) Skjern Håndbold	10	5	0	5	294	284	+10	10	Knockout stage	29–30	28–30	32–29	—	27–23	32–26
5	(Austria) Alpla HC Hard	10	1	2	7	270	300	−30	4		24–35	26–31	27–27	27–32	—	30–30
6	(Hungary) Balatonfüredi KSE	10	1	1	8	274	316	−42	3		28–31	25–31	25–30	28–31	27–26	—

Source: EHF
Rules for classification: Tiebreakers

25 October 2022; 17:00	Balatonfüredi KSE	25–30	(Spain) Fraikin Granollers	Veszprém Aréna, Veszprém; Attendance: 500; Referees: Boricic, Markovic (SRB)
25 October 2022; 17:00	Sretenović 5	(12–15)	Valera 14	Veszprém Aréna, Veszprém; Attendance: 500; Referees: Boricic, Markovic (SRB)
25 October 2022; 17:00	3× (yellow card) 1× (suspension)	Report	4× (yellow card) 1× (suspension)	Veszprém Aréna, Veszprém; Attendance: 500; Referees: Boricic, Markovic (SRB)

1 November 2022; 20:45	RK Nexe (Croatia)	37–23	Balatonfüredi KSE	OS Kralja Tomislava, Našice; Attendance: 2,000; Referees: Beqiri, Krasniqi (KOS)
1 November 2022; 20:45	three players 6	(18–10)	Szöllősi 5	OS Kralja Tomislava, Našice; Attendance: 2,000; Referees: Beqiri, Krasniqi (KOS)
1 November 2022; 20:45	1× (yellow card) 4× (suspension)	Report	2× (yellow card) 2× (suspension)	OS Kralja Tomislava, Našice; Attendance: 2,000; Referees: Beqiri, Krasniqi (KOS)

14 February 2023; 17:00	Balatonfüredi KSE	28–31	(Croatia) RK Nexe	Veszprém Aréna, Veszprém; Attendance: 300; Referees: Mošorinski, Pandžić (SRB)
14 February 2023; 17:00	Sretenović 8	(14–16)	Pribetić 7	Veszprém Aréna, Veszprém; Attendance: 300; Referees: Mošorinski, Pandžić (SRB)
14 February 2023; 17:00	1× (yellow card) 4× (suspension) 1× (red card)	Report	2× (yellow card) 4× (suspension)	Veszprém Aréna, Veszprém; Attendance: 300; Referees: Mošorinski, Pandžić (SRB)

22 November 2022; 17:00	Balatonfüredi KSE	28–31	(Denmark) Skjern Håndbold	Veszprém Aréna, Veszprém; Attendance: 300; Referees: Gasmi, Gasmi (FRA)
22 November 2022; 17:00	Gostovic 9	(15–16)	Jönsson, Tangen 8	Veszprém Aréna, Veszprém; Attendance: 300; Referees: Gasmi, Gasmi (FRA)
22 November 2022; 17:00	5× (suspension)	Report	4× (suspension)	Veszprém Aréna, Veszprém; Attendance: 300; Referees: Gasmi, Gasmi (FRA)

29 November 2022; 20:45	Sporting CP (Portugal)	35–32	Balatonfüredi KSE	Pavilhão João Rocha, Lisbon; Attendance: 357; Referees: Bethmann, Tzaferopoulos (GRE)
29 November 2022; 20:45	Salvador 7	(17–17)	Gostović 10	Pavilhão João Rocha, Lisbon; Attendance: 357; Referees: Bethmann, Tzaferopoulos (GRE)
29 November 2022; 20:45	3× (suspension)	Report	2× (yellow card) 3× (suspension)	Pavilhão João Rocha, Lisbon; Attendance: 357; Referees: Bethmann, Tzaferopoulos (GRE)

6 December 2022; 20:45	Alpla HC Hard (Austria)	30–30	Balatonfüredi KSE	Sporthalle am See, Hard; Attendance: 1,000; Referees: Baumgart, Wild (GER)
6 December 2022; 20:45	Raschle 8	(14–15)	Gostović 9	Sporthalle am See, Hard; Attendance: 1,000; Referees: Baumgart, Wild (GER)
6 December 2022; 20:45	1× (yellow card) 4× (suspension)	Report	2× (yellow card) 4× (suspension)	Sporthalle am See, Hard; Attendance: 1,000; Referees: Baumgart, Wild (GER)

13 December 2022; 17:00	Balatonfüredi KSE	27–26	(Austria) Alpla HC Hard	Veszprém Aréna, Veszprém; Attendance: 470; Referees: Mandák, Rudinský (SVK)
13 December 2022; 17:00	Gostović, Sretenović 6	(13–15)	Schnabl 10	Veszprém Aréna, Veszprém; Attendance: 470; Referees: Mandák, Rudinský (SVK)
13 December 2022; 17:00	1× (yellow card) 8× (suspension) 1× (red card)	Report	1× (yellow card) 8× (suspension)	Veszprém Aréna, Veszprém; Attendance: 470; Referees: Mandák, Rudinský (SVK)

7 February 2023; 20:45	Fraikin BM Granollers (Spain)	33–30	Balatonfüredi KSE	Palau d'Esports de Granollers, Granollers; Attendance: 800; Referees: Mitrevski, Todorovski (MKD)
7 February 2023; 20:45	García Robledo 9	(17–14)	Gostović 8	Palau d'Esports de Granollers, Granollers; Attendance: 800; Referees: Mitrevski, Todorovski (MKD)
7 February 2023; 20:45	1× (yellow card) 3× (suspension)	Report	2× (yellow card) 4× (suspension)	Palau d'Esports de Granollers, Granollers; Attendance: 800; Referees: Mitrevski, Todorovski (MKD)

21 February 2023; 18:45	Balatonfüredi KSE	25–31	(Portugal) Sporting CP	Veszprém Aréna, Veszprém; Attendance: 400; Referees: Backović, Palačković (SLO)
21 February 2023; 18:45	Szűcs 5	(13–16)	F. Costa 9	Veszprém Aréna, Veszprém; Attendance: 400; Referees: Backović, Palačković (SLO)
21 February 2023; 18:45	1× (yellow card) 3× (suspension)	Report	2× (yellow card) 5× (suspension)	Veszprém Aréna, Veszprém; Attendance: 400; Referees: Backović, Palačković (SLO)

28 February 2023; 18:45	Skjern Håndbold (Denmark)	32–26	Balatonfüredi KSE	Skjern Bank Arena, Skjern; Attendance: 2,325; Referees: Jerlecki, Łabuń (POL)
28 February 2023; 18:45	Tangen 7	(18–14)	Varga 10	Skjern Bank Arena, Skjern; Attendance: 2,325; Referees: Jerlecki, Łabuń (POL)
28 February 2023; 18:45	2× (suspension)	Report	3× (suspension)	Skjern Bank Arena, Skjern; Attendance: 2,325; Referees: Jerlecki, Łabuń (POL)

==== Results overview ====
Opposition	Home score	Away score	Double
(Denmark) Skjern Håndbold	28–31	32–26	54-63
(Spain) Fraikin Granollers	25–30	33–30	55-63
(Portugal) Sporting CP	25–31	35–32	57-66
(Croatia) RK Nexe	28–31	37–23	51-68
(Austria) Alpla HC Hard	27–26	30–30	57-56

== Statistics ==
=== Top scorers ===
Includes all competitive matches. The list is sorted by shirt number when total goals are equal. Last updated on 19 September 2022.

Position	Nation	No.	Name	Hungarian League	Hungarian Cup	European League	Total
1	(Serbia)	5	Stevan Sretenović	10	0		10
2	(Hungary)	9	Máté Szmetán	10	0		10
3	(Hungary)	14	Balázs Szöllősi	10	0		10
4	(Hungary)	78	Huba Vajda	8	0		8
5	(Hungary)	47	Péter Hornyák	7	0		7
6	(Hungary)	48	Bence Szűcs	6	0		6
7	(Hungary)	7	Bendegúz Bóka	6	0		6
8	(Hungary)	10	Balázs Németh	5	0		5
9	(Bosnia and Herzegovina)	44	Dejan Malinović	5	0		5
10	(Hungary)	91	Péter Határ	4	0		4
11	(Serbia)	13	Milan Gostović	3	0		3
12	(Hungary)	89	Balázs Brandt	2	0		2
			TOTALS	76	0		76
