= Pedro Rodríguez Álvarez =

Spanish-Hungarian handball player (born 1990)

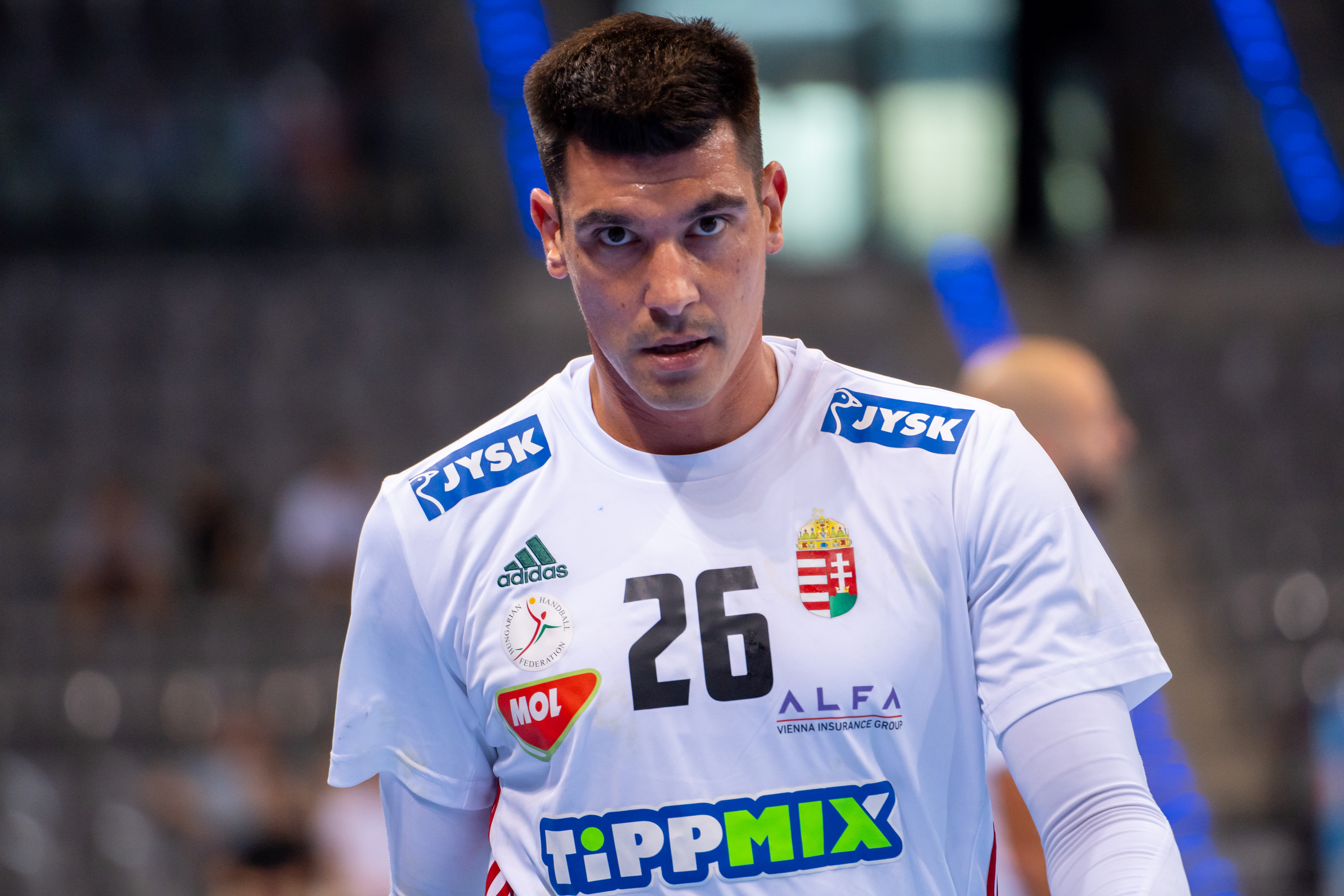

Personal information
- Nationality: Spanish / Hungarian
- Born: 22 August 1990 (age 36) Vigo, Spain
- Height: 1.93 m (6 ft 4 in)

Sport
- Sport: Handball
- Position: Right wing
- Current club: MOL Tatabánya KC
- Number: 26

Youth career
- Years: Team
- –: Academia Octavio

Senior clubs
- Years: Team
- 2008–2011: BM Ciudad Encantada
- 2011–2016: Naturhouse La Rioja
- 2016–2019: MOL-Pick Szeged
- 2019–2022: Balatonfüredi KSE
- 2022–: MOL Tatabánya KC
National team
Years	Team	Apps	(Gls)
2015–2016	Spain	3	(4)
2021–	Hungary	49	(119)

Pedro Rodríguez Álvarez (born 22 August 1990) is a Spanish-Hungarian handball player for MOL Tatabánya KC and for the Hungary national team.

== Career ==
=== Club ===
At the beginning of his career, he played handball for Academia Octavio and BM Ciudad Encantada before moving to Naturhouse La Rioja. Here, in the 2012–2013 season, he was able to make his debut in the EHF Cup, and later played in the EHF Champions League. In 2013, Atlético Madrid would have signed him, but the team went bankrupt, so Pedro remained a Naturhouse La Rioja player. In the summer of 2016, he transferred to MOL-Pick Szeged in the Hungarian league, with whom he won the league title in the 2017–2018 season and the Hungarian Cup in the 2018–19 season. From the summer of 2019, he will continue his career in the Balatonfüredi KSE team. He spent three seasons with the Balatonfüredi KSE team, then transferred to MOL Tatabánya KC before the 2022–2023 season. In 2023 and 2024, he won the bronze medal in the championship with the team. In 2025 the MOL Tatabánya KC team won bronze in the Hungarian Cup, Pedro scored 3 goals in the bronze medal match. In 2026, the team reached the final of the Hungarian Cup, but were defeated there by ONE Veszprém. Pedro scored 2 goals in the final.

=== National team ===
He made his debut in the Spain men's national handball team at a preparatory tournament in Poland. Made his debut in the Spain men's national handball team on November 7, 2015: Spain-Sweden 32:27 (scored 3 goals). Because of the excellent Spanish right wingers, he was not considered for the Spain men's national handball team, so when he received Hungarian citizenship, he became a player of the Hungary men's national handball team. He played for the Hungarian national team for the first time at the 2021 World Men's Handball Championship: Hungary-Uruguay 44–18 on January 17, 2021 (scored 3 goals). He scored 7 goals in 4 matches at the 2021 World Men's Handball Championship. He was a member of the 2022 European Men's Handball Championship squad, he played in all three matches of the Hungarian national team at the European Championship, scoring 9 goals. He also participated in the 2023 World Men's Handball Championship as a member of the Hungary men's national handball team. (8th place, 9 matches / 21 goals). He was included in the large squad of the 2024 European Men's Handball Championship, but in the end he will not become a member of the narrow squad. He also participated in the 2024 Paris Olympics, where the Hungarian team finished 10th (3 matches / 2 goals). He also participated in the 2025 World Men's Handball Championship as a member of the Hungary men's national handball team. (8th place, 4 matches / 11 goals). He also participated in the 2026 European Men's Handball Championship as a member of the Hungary men's national handball team. (10th place, 2 games / 4 goals).

== Honours ==
=== Club ===
Naturhouse La Rioja

- Liga ASOBAL:
  - Silver: 2014, 2015, 2016
  - Bronze: 2013
- Copa del Rey:
  - Silver: 2013
- Copa ASOBAL:
  - Silver: 2016
- Supercopa de España:
  - Silver: 2014

MOL-Pick Szeged

- Nemzeti Bajnokság I:
  - Gold: 2018
  - Silver: 2017, 2019
- Magyar Kupa:
  - Gold: 2019
  - Silver: 2017, 2018

Balatonfüredi KSE

- Nemzeti Bajnokság I:
  - Bronze: 2022
- Magyar Kupa:
  - Bronze: 2021

MOL Tatabánya KC

- EHF European Cup:
  - Silver: 2026
- Nemzeti Bajnokság I:
  - Bronze: 2023, 2024, 2026
- Magyar Kupa
  - Silver: 2026
  - Bronze: 2025
