= Petar Topic =

Croatian-Hungarian handball player (born 1991)

Personal information
- Nationality: Croatian / Hungarian
- Born: 30 December 1991 (age 34) Split, Croatia
- Height: 2.01 m (6 ft 7 in)

Sport
- Sport: Handball
- Position: Pivot
- Current club: RK Zagreb
- Number: 20

Senior clubs
- Years: Team
- 2010–2013: (Croatia) RK Kastela
- 2013: (North Macedonia) RK Metalurg Skopje
- 2013–2015: (Croatia) RK Poreč
- 2015–2016: (North Macedonia) RK Pelister
- 2016–2017: (Hungary) Váci KSE
- 2017–2022: (Hungary) Balatonfüredi KSE
- 2022–02/2025: (Hungary) MOL Tatabánya KC
- 02/2025–: (Croatia) RK Zagreb
National team
Years	Team	Apps	(Gls)
2021–	Hungary	15	(41)

Petar Topic (born 30 December 1991) is a Croatian-born Hungarian handball player for RK Zagreb and for the Hungarian national team.

== Career ==
=== Club ===
At the beginning of his career, he played in the Croatian club RK Kastela. Here he made his debut in the EHF Cup Winners' Cup in the 2010–2011 season. In the summer of 2013, he transferred to the Macedonian Handball Super League team RK Metalurg Skopje, which he left again in November and returned to the Croatian Premier League with RK Poreč. With this, he participated in the 2013-14 EHF Cup. In 2015, he signed for RK Pelister Bitola. In the 2016–17 season, he moved to Hungary to the Váci KSE team. He then played for Balatonfüredi KSE for five years, with which he played in the EHF Cup. He has been playing in the MOL Tatabánya KC team since 2022. In February 2023, he suffered a rupture of the Achilles tendon in the match against Csurgói KK. After an 8-month absence, he returned to the field in the MOL Tatabánya KC-Ferencvárosi TC match, where MOL Tatabánya KC won 29–24, Petar scored 3 goals. In the MOL Tatabánya KC team, he played in the EHF European League in the 2023-24 and 2024–25 seasons. At the end of February 2025, it was announced that the Croatian record champion RK Zagreb bought him from the MOL Tatabánya KC team and he transferred to the Croatian team with immediate effect.

=== National team ===
In October 2020, he received Hungarian citizenship, thus becoming a player of the Hungarian national team. He played for the Hungarian national team for the first time at the 2021 World Men's Handball Championship: Hungary-Cape Verde 34–27 on January 15, 2021 (scored 1 goals). He scored 2 goals in 2 matches at the 2021 World Men's Handball Championship. He was a member of the 2022 European Men's Handball Championship squad, he played in all three matches of the Hungarian national team at the European Championship, scoring 6 goals. He was included in the large squad of the 2023 World Men's Handball Championship, but in the end he will not become a member of the narrow squad. He was included in the large squad of the 2024 European Men's Handball Championship, but in the end he will not become a member of the narrow squad.

== Honours ==
=== Club ===
Balatonfüredi KSE

- Nemzeti Bajnokság I:
  - Bronze: 2022
- Magyar Kupa:
  - Bronze: 2018, 2019, 2021

MOL Tatabánya KC

- Nemzeti Bajnokság I:
  - Bronze: 2023, 2024
