= Balatonfüredi KSE =

Hungarian handball club

- Full name: Balatonfüredi Kézilabda Sport Egyesület
- Short name: BKSE, Füred
- Founded: 1990; 36 years ago
- Arena: Balaton Szabadidő és Konferencia Központ, Balatonfüred
- Capacity: 712 seats
- President: László Csima
- Head coach: Ákos Kis
- Captain: Bendegúz Bóka
- League: Nemzeti Bajnokság I
- 2022–23: Nemzeti Bajnokság I, 5th of 14
- Club colours
Home	Away

Balatonfüredi Kézilabda Sport Egyesület is a Hungarian handball club from Balatonfüred, that currently plays in the Nemzeti Bajnokság I. The team won promotion to the top division in 2007 and achieved their best ever result in 2009 by finishing fifth. In the 2009–2010 Hungarian Cup campaign the club finished third, but as the two finalists, MKB Veszprém KC and Pick Szeged already secured their places in the EHF Champions League, BKSE got the right to represent Hungary in the EHF Cup Winners' Cup next season.

Location of Balatonfüredi KSE

== Crest, colours, supporters ==
=== Naming history ===
Name	Period
Balatonfüredi SC	−1995
PEVA Balatonfüredi SC	1995–1996
Balatonfüredi KC	1996–2002
Balatoni KC	2002–2007
Balatonfüredi KC	2007–2009
Balatonfüredi KSE	2009–present

=== Kit manufacturers ===
Period	Kit manufacturer
–2013	(Italy) Gems
2013–2020	(Germany) Erima
2020–present	(Hungary) 2Rule

=== Kits ===
HOME
2016–17	2017–18	2018–19	2019–20	2021–22

AWAY
2016–17	2017–18	2018–19	2019–20	2021–22

THIRD
2016–17	2017–18	2018–19

== Sports Hall information ==
- Name: – Balaton Szabadidő és Konferencia Központ
- City: – Balatonfüred
- Capacity: – 712
- Address: – 8230 Balatonfüred, Horváth Mihály u. 64.

== Management ==
Position	Name
President	(Hungary) János Eppel
Executive Director	(Hungary) Tamás Bene
Sports Director	(Hungary) Ákos Kis

== Team ==
=== Current squad ===
Squad for the 2025–26 season

Balatonfüredi KSE

Goalkeepers

- 11 (Hungary) Xavér Deményi
- 16 (Hungary) Ádám Füstös
- 61 (Hungary) Benedek Erdei

Left Wingers

- 4 (Hungary) Bence Kovács
- 7 (Hungary) Bendegúz Bóka (c)

Right Wingers

- 47 (Hungary) Péter Hornyák
- 50 (Hungary) Csongor Urbán-Patocskai

Line Players

- 20 (Hungary) Mátyás Simotics
- 22 (Hungary) Máté Klucsik
- 24 (Hungary) Gellért Fekete
- 37 (Russia) Denis Vasilev
- 55 (Hungary) Gábor Garajszki
- 78 (Hungary) Axel Tóth

Central Backs

- 10 (Hungary) Balázs Németh
- 13 (Hungary) Noel Tóth
- 31 (Hungary) (Ukraine) Viktor Melnicsuk

Left Backs

- 5 (Serbia) Stevan Sretenović
- 6 (Hungary) Márton Varga
- 77 (Hungary) Levente Zsolt Szabó

Right Backs

- 8 (Slovenia) Tim Rozman
- 15 (Hungary) Bálint Fekete

=== Technical staff ===
- Head Coach: (Hungary) Ákos Kis
- Assistant Coach: (Hungary) Bálint Papp
- Coach: (Ukraine) (Hungary) Igor Zubjuk
- Fitness coach: (Hungary) Krisztián Saitz
- Goalkeeping Coach: (Hungary) János Szathmári
- Masseur: (Hungary) Richárd Rácz

=== Transfers ===
Transfers for the 2026–27 season

Joining

- (Serbia) Veljko Popović (CB) from (Serbia) RK Partizan
- (Hungary) János Podoba (GK) from (Hungary) NEKA

Leaving

- (Russia) Denis Vasilev (LP)
- (Hungary) (Ukraine) Viktor Melnicsuk (CB) to (Hungary) Budai Farkasok KKUK
- (Hungary) Xavér Deményi (GK) to (Hungary) Szigetszentmiklósi KSK

Transfers for the 2025–26 season

Joining

- (Hungary) Bálint Fekete (RB) from (Hungary) Dabas KK
- (Hungary) Gábor Garajszki (LP) from (Hungary) Dabas KK
- (Hungary) Ádám Füstös (GK) from (Hungary) Csurgói KK
- (Hungary) Tamás Jánosi (LB) back from loan at (Spain) Ángel Ximénez Puente Genil
- (Hungary) Máté Klucsik (LP) back from loan at (Hungary) Szigetszentmiklósi KSK
- (Hungary) Gellért Fekete (LP) back from loan at (Hungary) Budakalász FKC
- (Hungary) (Ukraine) Viktor Melnicsuk (CB) back from loan at (Hungary) Carbonex-Komló

Leaving

- (Slovenia) Tadej Kljun to (RB) (Slovenia) RD Slovan
- (Hungary) Arián Andó (GK) to (Hungary) MOL Tatabánya KC
- (Hungary) Balázs Szöllősi (CB) to (Hungary) Győri ETO-UNI FKC
- (Hungary) László Lovistyek (GK)
- (Hungary) Máté Klucsik (LP) on loan at (Hungary) Szigetszentmiklósi KSK
- (Hungary) Gellért Fekete (LP) on loan at (Hungary) Budakalász FKC
- (Hungary) Márk Vári (RB) to (Hungary) NEKA
- (Hungary) Tamás Jánosi (LB) to (Spain) BM Villa de Aranda
- (Hungary) Máté Szmetán (CB) to (Hungary) Győri ETO-UNI FKC

Transfers for the 2024–25 season

Joining

- (Russia) Denis Vasilev (LP) from (North Macedonia) RK Eurofarm Pelister
- (Slovenia) Tim Rozman (RB) from (Austria) Union Handballklub Krems
- (Hungary) (Ukraine) Viktor Melnicsuk (CB) from (Hungary) Carbonex-Komló
- (Hungary) Mátyás Simotics (LP) from (Hungary) PLER-Budapest
- (Hungary) Xavér Deményi (GK) from (Hungary) NEKA
- (Hungary) Gellért Fekete (LP) from (Hungary) OTP Bank - Pick Szeged U21

Leaving

- (Bosnia and Herzegovina) Dejan Malinović (RB) to (Hungary) PLER-Budapest
- (Slovenia) Domen Sikošek Pelko (LP) to (Slovenia) RK Krško
- (Serbia) Milan Gostović (RB) to (Israel) Maccabi Tel Aviv
- (Hungary) Bence Szűcs (LP) to (France) US Dunkerque HB
- (Hungary) Dániel Bősz (GK) to (Hungary) Győri ETO-UNI FKC
- (Hungary) Gellért Draskovics (LB) to (Hungary) Budai Farkasok KKUK
- (Hungary) László Kemény (LP) to (Hungary) PLER-Budapest
- (Hungary) János Dénes (LP) to (Hungary) PLER-Budapest
- (Hungary) Balázs Brandt (RW) to (Hungary) Szigetszentmiklósi KSK
- (Hungary) (Ukraine) Viktor Melnicsuk (CB) on loan at (Hungary) Carbonex-Komló

Transfers for the 2023–24 season

Joining

- (Slovenia) Tadej Kljun (RB) from (Portugal) S.L. Benfica
- (Slovenia) Domen Sikošek Pelko (LP) from (Cyprus) Sabbianco Anorthosis Famagusta

Leaving

- (Hungary) Huba Vajda (LP) to (Hungary) MOL Tatabánya KC
- (Hungary) (Slovakia) Mihály Tóth (GK) to (Hungary) Budakalász FKC
- (Hungary) Bálint Ág (LW) to (Hungary) Ceglédi KKSE
- (Hungary) Péter Határ (LB) to (Hungary) Ceglédi KKSE
- (Hungary) Tamás Jánosi (LB) on loan at (Spain) Ángel Ximénez Puente Genil
- (Hungary) Gellért Draskovics (LB) on loan at (Hungary) Fejér B.Á.L. Veszprém
- (Hungary) Márk Vári (RB) on loan at (Hungary) SC Pick Szeged U21
- (Hungary) Máté Klucsik (LP) on loan at (Hungary) Tatai AC
- (Hungary) László Lovistyek (GK) on loan at (Hungary) Szigetszentmiklósi KSK

Transfers for the 2022–23 season

Joining

- (Serbia) Stevan Sretenović (LB) from (Belarus) HC Meshkov Brest
- (Hungary) Péter Hornyák (RW) from (Hungary) Tatabánya KC
- (Hungary) Huba Vajda (LP) back from loan at (Hungary) Veszprém KKFT Felsőörs
- (Hungary) Márk Vári (RB) from (Hungary) Ferencvárosi TC

Leaving

- (Hungary) (Croatia) Petar Topic (LP) to (Hungary) Tatabánya KC
- (Hungary) (Spain) Pedro Rodríguez Álvarez (RW) to (Hungary) Tatabánya KC
- (Hungary) Áron Ágoston (GK) to (Hungary) SBS-Eger

Transfers for the 2021–22 season

Joining

- (Hungary) Áron Ágoston (GK) from (Hungary) Veszprém KKFT Felsőörs
- (Hungary) Balázs Németh (CB) from (Hungary) Ceglédi KKSE
- (Serbia) Milan Gostović (RB) from (Spain) Ademar León
- (Hungary) (Slovakia) Mihály Tóth (GK) from (Hungary) Gyöngyösi KK

Leaving

- (Hungary) Gábor Pulay (RB) to (Hungary) SBS-Eger
- (Hungary) Bence Seprős (GK) to (Hungary) SBS-Eger
- (Montenegro) Aleksandar Glendža (LB) to (Romania) HC Buzău
- (Hungary) Gellért Draskovics (LB) on loan at (Hungary) NEKA

Transfers for the 2020–21 season

Joining

- (Hungary) János Dénes (LP) from (Hungary) Grundfos Tatabánya KC
- (Hungary) Gábor Pulay (RB) from (Germany) HC Elbflorenz Dresden
- (Hungary) László Horváth (CB) from (Hungary) Mezőkövesdi KC
- (Bosnia and Herzegovina) Dejan Malinović (RB) from (Romania) Dobrogea Sud Constanța
- (Montenegro) Aleksandar Glendža (LB) from (Austria) UHK Krems

Leaving

- (Hungary) Nándor Fazekas (GK) (retires)
- (Hungary) Dominik Máthé (RB) to (Norway) Elverum Håndball
- (Hungary) Bence Zdolik (LB) to (Hungary) Grundfos Tatabánya KC
- (Hungary) Huba Vajda (LP) on loan at (Hungary) Veszprém KKFT Felsőörs
- (Serbia) Darko Stevanović (LB) to (Qatar) Al Arabi
- (Spain) Luis Felipe Jiménez Reina (RB) to (Greece) AEK H.C.
- (Hungary) Bence Déber (RW)
- (Bosnia and Herzegovina) Tarik Vranac (LB) to (Hungary) Ceglédi KKSE
- (Hungary) Barnabás Orbán (LW) to (Hungary) Pécsi EAC
- (Hungary) Balázs Németh (CB) to (Hungary) Ceglédi KKSE
- (Hungary) László Horváth (CB) to (Hungary) Dabas KK
- (Belarus) Aliaksei Shynkel (LB)

Transfers for the 2019–20 season

Joining

- (Spain) Luis Felipe Jiménez Reina (RB) from (Greece) Olympiacos H.C.
- (Spain) (Hungary) Pedro Rodríguez Álvarez (RW) from (Hungary) MOL-Pick Szeged
- (Belarus) Aliaksei Shynkel (LB) from (Ukraine) Motor Zaporizhzhia
- (Serbia) Darko Stevanović (LB) from (Serbia) RK Partizan
- (Hungary) Ákos Kőhegyi (CB) from (Hungary) Telekom Veszprém

Leaving

- (Hungary) Zoltán Szita (LB) to (Poland) Wisła Płock
- (Hungary) Péter Hornyák (RW) to (Hungary) Grundfos Tatabánya KC
- (Brazil) Uelington da Silva (LB) to (France) Saran Loiret HB
- (Slovakia) (Hungary) Ottó Kancel (LB) to (Hungary) Orosházi FKSE
- (Russia) Yury Semenov (CB) to (Finland) Riihimäki Cocks
- (Hungary) Olivér Szöllősi (LP) to (Hungary) Mezőkövesdi KC
- (Hungary) Áron Ágoston (GK) to (Hungary) Veszprém KKFT Felsőörs
- (Serbia) Darko Stevanović (LB) on loan at (Hungary) Eger Eszterházy SZSE

Transfers for the 2018–19 season

Joining

- (Brazil) Uelington da Silva (LB) from (Hungary) Csurgói KK
- (Hungary) Balázs Szöllősi (CB) from (Hungary) Grundfos Tatabánya KC

Leaving

- (Czech Republic) Stanislav Kašpárek (RB) to (Hungary) MOL-Pick Szeged
- (Hungary) Dávid Debreczeni (LP) to (Hungary) Ferencvárosi TC
- (Hungary) Milán Varsandán (LW) to (Hungary) Gyöngyösi KK
- (Hungary) László Horváth (CB) to (Hungary) Mezőkövesdi KC
- (Belarus) Artur Karvatski (RB) to (Croatia) RK Zagreb
- (Hungary) Bence Szűcs (LP) on loan at (Hungary) Telekom Veszprém

Transfers for the 2017–18 season

Joining

- (Hungary) Bendegúz Bóka (LW) from (Hungary) MOL-Pick Szeged
- (Hungary) Dániel Bősz (GK) from (Hungary) Ceglédi KKSE
- (Hungary) Péter Hornyák (RW) from (Hungary) Csurgói KK
- (Belarus) Artur Karvatski (RB) from (Belarus) SKA Minsk
- (Hungary) Zoltán Szita (LB) on loan from (Hungary) Telekom Veszprém
- (Croatia) Petar Topic (LP) from (Hungary) Váci KSE
- (Bosnia and Herzegovina) Tarik Vranac (LB) from (Hungary) Balmazújvárosi KK

Leaving

- (Hungary) Mátyás Győri (CB) to (Hungary) Telekom Veszprém
- (Hungary) Tibor Gerdán (LP) to (Hungary) Gyöngyösi KK
- (Hungary) Máté Gábori (RW) to (Hungary) Gyöngyösi KK
- (Serbia) Miljan Ivanović (LB) to (Bosnia and Herzegovina) RK Sloga Doboj
- (Hungary) Ádám Vasvári (LB) to (Hungary) Csurgói KK
- (Hungary) Richárd Nemes (LP) to (Hungary) Budakalász FKC
- (Hungary) Benjamin Sinkovits (RW) to (Hungary) Budakalász FKC
- (North Macedonia) Mihail Petrovski (RB) to (Hungary) Dabas KK
- (Hungary) Olivér Szöllősi (LP) on loan at (Hungary) Dabas KK
- (Montenegro) (Serbia) Radivoje Ristanović (GK) to (Israel) Maccabi Rishon LeZion
- (Hungary) Gergő Rózsavölgyi (GK) to (Hungary) Váci KSE
- (Hungary) Dávid Szilágyi (LP)

Transfers for the 2016–17 season

Joining

- (Montenegro) (Serbia) Radivoje Ristanović (GK) from (France) Chambéry SMBH
- (Hungary) Dávid Debreczeni (LP) from (Hungary) Gyöngyösi KK
- (Hungary) Milán Varsandán (LW) from (Hungary) Gyöngyösi KK
- (Russia) Yury Semenov (CB) from (Russia) Dinamo Astrakhan
- (Serbia) Miljan Ivanović (LB) from (Norway) Bodø HK
- (Hungary) Bence Szűcs (LP) from (Hungary) Balmazújvárosi KK
- (Hungary) Benjamin Sinkovits (RW) from (Hungary) PLER KC
- (Hungary) Bálint Ág (LW) from (Hungary) Alba Regia KSE

Leaving

- (Hungary) Bence Bánhidi (LP) to (Hungary) MOL-Pick Szeged
- (Hungary) Bendegúz Bóka (LW) to (Hungary) MOL-Pick Szeged
- (Hungary) Balázs Szöllősi (CB) to (Hungary) Grundfos Tatabánya KC
- (Hungary) Norbert Gyene (RW) loan back to (Hungary) Telekom Veszprém
- (Hungary) Patrik Ligetvári (LB) loan back to (Hungary) Telekom Veszprém
- (Hungary) Koppány Törteli (CB) to (Hungary) Váci KSE
- (Hungary) Gábor Pordán (RB) to (Hungary) Mezőkövesdi KC
- (Hungary) Kristóf Győri (GK) to (Hungary) NEKA
- (Hungary) István Mátó (LP) on loan at (Hungary) Csurgói KK
- (Hungary) Benjamin Sinkovits (RW) on loan at (Hungary) PLER KC
- (Hungary) Gergő Rózsavölgyi (GK) on loan at (Hungary) Gyöngyösi KK

Transfers for the 2015–16 season

Joining

- (Hungary) Nándor Fazekas (GK) from (Hungary) MKB-MVM Veszprém
- (Hungary) Gergő Rózsavölgyi (GK) from (Hungary) MKB-MVM Veszprém
- (Hungary) Arián Andó (GK) from (Hungary) Gyöngyösi KK
- (Czech Republic) Stanislav Kašpárek (RB) from (Czech Republic) HC Zubří
- (North Macedonia) Mihail Petrovski (RB) from (France) Valence HB
- (Hungary) Norbert Gyene (RW) on loan from (Hungary) MKB-MVM Veszprém
- (Slovakia) (Hungary) Ottó Kancel (LB) from (Hungary) MKB-MVM Veszprém
- (Hungary) Dávid Szilágyi (LP) from (Hungary) Békési FKC
- (Hungary) Márton Varga (LB) from (Hungary) Balmazújvárosi KK
- (Hungary) Huba Vajda (LP) from (Hungary) ETO-SZESE Győr

Leaving

- (Hungary) Tamás Iváncsik (RW) loan back to (Hungary) MKB-MVM Veszprém
- (Hungary) (Serbia) Uroš Vilovski (LP) loan back to (Hungary) MKB-MVM Veszprém
- (Hungary) Ádám Borbély (GK) loan back to (Hungary) MKB-MVM Veszprém
- (Slovakia) (Hungary) Ottó Kancel (LB) loan back to (Hungary) MKB-MVM Veszprém
- (Hungary) Péter Kovacsics (LW) loan back to (Hungary) Csurgói KK
- (Hungary) Márton Székely (GK) to (Hungary) Csurgói KK
- (Hungary) Rudolf Faluvégi (LB) to (Hungary) Csurgói KK
- (Russia) Aleksey Grigoriev (RB) to (Romania) AHC Potaissa Turda
- (Hungary) Ákos Kis (LB) to (Hungary) Veszprémi KSE
- (Hungary) Gábor Lelkes (RB) to (Hungary) Veszprémi KSE
- (Hungary) Károly Juhász (CB) to (Hungary) Gyöngyösi KK
- (Hungary) Ádám Bujtár (RW) to (Hungary) Ferencvárosi TC
- (Hungary) Endre Komendánt (GK) to (Hungary) Ferencvárosi TC
- (Hungary) István Mátó (LP) on loan at (Hungary) Ferencvárosi TC
- (Hungary) Dániel Nagy (RW) on loan at (Hungary) Szigetszentmiklósi KSK

Transfers for the 2014–15 season

Joining

- (Hungary) Tamás Iváncsik (RW) on loan from (Hungary) MKB-MVM Veszprém
- (Hungary) Patrik Ligetvári (LB) on loan from (Hungary) MKB-MVM Veszprém
- (Hungary) (Serbia) Uroš Vilovski (LP) on loan from (Hungary) MKB-MVM Veszprém
- (Hungary) Ádám Borbély (GK) on loan from (Hungary) MKB-MVM Veszprém
- (Slovakia) (Hungary) Ottó Kancel (LB) on loan from (Hungary) MKB-MVM Veszprém
- (Hungary) Péter Kovacsics (LW) on loan from (Hungary) Csurgói KK
- (Hungary) Máté Gábori (RW) from (Hungary) Váci KSE
- (Hungary) Dominik Máthé (RB) from (Hungary) PLER KC
- (Hungary) Olivér Szöllősi (LP) from (Hungary) PLER KC

Leaving

- (Hungary) István Pásztor (LW) to (Hungary) Veszprémi Egyetemi SC
- (Hungary) Csaba Tombor (RW) to (Hungary) Veszprémi Egyetemi SC
- (Hungary) György Kovács (LP) to (Hungary) Veszprémi Egyetemi SC
- (Hungary) Ádám Bujtár (RW) on loan at (Hungary) Sport36-Komló
- (Hungary) László Kemény (LP) on loan at (Hungary) PLER KC
- (Hungary) Dániel Nagy (RW) on loan at (Hungary) Csurgói KK

Transfers for the 2013–14 season

Joining

- (Hungary) Mátyás Győri (CB) from (Hungary) Békési FKC
- (Hungary) Kristóf Győri (GK) from (Hungary) Békési FKC
- (Hungary) Károly Juhász (CB) from (Hungary) Eger Eszterházy SZSE
- (Hungary) Márton Székely (GK) from (Hungary) PLER KC
- (Hungary) Richárd Nemes (LP) from (Hungary) MKB-MVM Veszprém
- (Hungary) Ádám Bujtár (RW) from (Hungary) Pécsi VSE

Leaving

- (Croatia) Josip Šandrk (LB) to (Croatia) RK Zagreb
- (Hungary) János Szathmári (GK) (retires)
- (Hungary) Tamás Szabó (GK) to (Hungary) PLER KC
- (Spain) Oscar Rio Rasillo (CB) to (Spain) CB Antequera
- (Hungary) Gábor Pulay (RB) to (Germany) SG LVB Leipzig
- (Hungary) László Németh (LW) to (Hungary) Orosházi FKSE
- (Hungary) Péter Hornyák (RW) to (Germany) TUSEM Essen

== Previous squads ==
2021–2022 Team
Shirt No	Nationality	Player	Birth Date	Position
1	Hungary	Dániel Bősz	21 January 1991 (age 35)	Goalkeeper
3	Hungary	László Kemény	23 February 1993 (age 33)	Line Player
6	Hungary	Márton Varga	1 January 1999 (age 27)	Left Back
7	Hungary	Bendegúz Bóka	2 October 1993 (age 32)	Left Winger
8	Hungary	Tamás Jánosi	8 March 2002 (age 24)	Left Back
9	Hungary	Máté Szmetán	5 August 2001 (age 25)	Central Back
10	Hungary	Balázs Németh	27 December 1993 (age 32)	Central Back
13	Serbia	Milan Gostović	12 February 2001 (age 25)	Right Back
14	Hungary	Balázs Szöllősi	24 October 1992 (age 33)	Central Back
16	HungarySlovakia	Mihály Tóth	3 September 1992 (age 33)	Goalkeeper
21	Hungary	Arián Andó	29 January 1999 (age 27)	Goalkeeper
22	CroatiaHungary	Petar Topic	30 December 1991 (age 34)	Line Player
24	Hungary	János Dénes	15 November 1984 (age 41)	Line Player
26	SpainHungary	Pedro Rodríguez Álvarez	22 August 1990 (age 36)	Right Winger
30	Hungary	Bálint Ág	26 March 1999 (age 27)	Left Winger
32	Hungary	Áron Ágoston	6 June 2001 (age 25)	Goalkeeper
44	Bosnia and Herzegovina	Dejan Malinović	12 April 1992 (age 34)	Right Back
48	Hungary	Bence Szűcs	25 May 1999 (age 27)	Line Player
89	Hungary	Balázs Brandt	29 April 2000 (age 26)	Right Winger
90	Hungary	Gellért Draskovics	26 May 2000 (age 26)	Left Back
91	Hungary	Péter Határ	11 January 2001 (age 25)	Left Back

2018–2019 Team
Shirt No	Nationality	Player	Birth Date	Position
1	Hungary	Nándor Fazekas	16 October 1976 (age 49)	Goalkeeper
3	Hungary	László Kemény	23 February 1993 (age 33)	Line Player
4	Hungary	Huba Vajda	5 March 2000 (age 26)	Line Player
5	Hungary	Péter Határ	11 January 2001 (age 25)	Right Back
6	Hungary	Márton Varga	1 January 1999 (age 27)	Central Back
7	Hungary	Bendegúz Bóka	2 October 1993 (age 32)	Left Winger
8	Hungary	Bence Déber	3 June 1997 (age 29)	Right Winger
9	Hungary	Olivér Szöllősi	6 February 1998 (age 28)	Line Player
10	Hungary	Balázs Németh	27 December 1993 (age 32)	Central Back
11	Hungary	Barnabás Orbán	28 February 1999 (age 27)	Left Winger
12	Hungary	Dániel Bősz	21 January 1991 (age 35)	Goalkeeper
13	SlovakiaHungary	Ottó Kancel	1 February 1995 (age 31)	Left Back
14	Hungary	Balázs Szöllősi	24 October 1992 (age 33)	Central Back
15	Brazil	Da Silva Uelington Ferreira	13 August 1986 (age 40)	Left Back
21	Hungary	Zoltán Szita	10 February 1998 (age 28)	Left Back
22	CroatiaHungary	Petar Topic	30 December 1991 (age 34)	Line Player
30	Hungary	Bálint Ág	26 March 1999 (age 27)	Left Winger
34	Hungary	Alex Németh	18 September 1998 (age 27)	Central Back
43	Belarus	Artur Karvatski	21 January 1996 (age 30)	Right Back
47	Hungary	Péter Hornyák	4 October 1995 (age 30)	Right Winger
55	Russia	Yury Semenov	30 July 1990 (age 36)	Central Back
92	Hungary	Bence Zdolik	16 May 1992 (age 34)	Left Back
96	Hungary	Arián Andó	29 January 1999 (age 27)	Goalkeeper
99	Hungary	Dominik Máthé	1 April 1999 (age 27)	Right Back

2017–2018 Team
Shirt No	Nationality	Player	Birth Date	Position
1	Hungary	Nándor Fazekas	16 October 1976 (age 49)	Goalkeeper
3	Hungary	Tibor Gerdán	20 March 1992 (age 34)	Line Player
4	Hungary	Balázs Németh	27 December 1993 (age 32)	Central Back
5	Hungary	László Horváth	22 September 1998 (age 27)	Central Back
6	Hungary	Márton Varga	1 January 1999 (age 27)	Central Back
7	Hungary	Bendegúz Bóka	2 October 1993 (age 32)	Left Winger
8	Hungary	Bence Déber	3 June 1997 (age 29)	Right Winger
9	Bosnia and Herzegovina	Tarik Vranac	23 December 1993 (age 32)	Left Back
11	Hungary	Dominik Máthé	1 April 1999 (age 27)	Right Back
12	Hungary	Dániel Bősz	21 January 1991 (age 35)	Goalkeeper
13	SlovakiaHungary	Ottó Kancel	1 February 1995 (age 31)	Left Back
15	Hungary	Milán Varsandán	28 June 1989 (age 37)	Left Winger
16	Hungary	Arián Andó	29 January 1999 (age 27)	Goalkeeper
18	Belarus	Artur Karvatski	21 January 1996 (age 30)	Right Back
19	Hungary	Péter Hornyák	4 October 1995 (age 30)	Right Winger
21	Hungary	Zoltán Szita	10 February 1998 (age 28)	Left Back
22	CroatiaHungary	Petar Topic	30 December 1991 (age 34)	Line Player
23	Hungary	Dávid Debreczeni	23 September 1992 (age 33)	Line Player
29	Hungary	Bence Zdolik	16 May 1992 (age 34)	Left Back
37	Czech Republic	Stanislav Kašpárek	11 June 1996 (age 30)	Right Back
55	Russia	Yury Semenov	30 July 1990 (age 36)	Central Back
93	Hungary	László Kemény	23 February 1993 (age 33)	Line Player

2014–2015 Team
Shirt No	Nationality	Player	Birth Date	Position
1	Hungary	Ádám Borbély	22 June 1995 (age 31)	Goalkeeper
3	Hungary	Tibor Gerdán	20 March 1992 (age 34)	Line Player
4	Hungary	Balázs Németh	27 December 1993 (age 32)	Central Back
5	Hungary	Károly Juhász	2 April 1987 (age 39)	Central Back
6	Hungary	Mátyás Győri	2 February 1997 (age 29)	Central Back
7	Hungary	Bendegúz Bóka	2 October 1993 (age 32)	Left Winger
8	Hungary	Ákos Kis	31 December 1975 (age 50)	Left Back
9	Hungary	Bence Bánhidi	9 February 1995 (age 31)	Line Player
10	Hungary	Gábor Lelkes	17 May 1982 (age 44)	Right Back
12	Hungary	Márton Székely	2 January 1990 (age 36)	Goalkeeper
13	Hungary	Koppány Törteli	2 October 1994 (age 31)	Central Back
14	Hungary	Balázs Szöllősi	24 October 1992 (age 33)	Central Back
15	HungarySerbia	Uroš Vilovski	25 February 1984 (age 42)	Line Player
16	Hungary	Endre Komendánt	30 January 1992 (age 34)	Goalkeeper
17	Hungary	Ádám Vasvári	24 April 1994 (age 32)	Left Back
19	Hungary	Patrik Ligetvári	13 February 1996 (age 30)	Left Back
20	Hungary	Máté Gábori	1 October 1987 (age 38)	Right Winger
22	Hungary	Rudolf Faluvégi	9 January 1994 (age 32)	Left Back
29	Hungary	Bence Zdolik	16 May 1992 (age 34)	Left Back
33	Russia	Aleksey Grigoriev	19 February 1983 (age 43)	Right Back
39	Hungary	Tamás Iváncsik	3 April 1983 (age 43)	Right Winger
90	SlovakiaHungary	Ottó Kancel	1 February 1995 (age 31)	Left Back
99	Hungary	Péter Kovacsics	13 June 1994 (age 32)	Left Winger

2012–2013 Team
Shirt No	Nationality	Player	Birth Date	Position
1	Hungary	Tamás Szabó	3 March 1982 (age 44)	Goalkeeper
2	Hungary	Dániel Nagy	14 July 1992 (age 34)	Right Winger
3	Hungary	Tibor Gerdán	20 March 1992 (age 34)	Line Player
4	Hungary	László Németh	30 April 1989 (age 37)	Left Winger
5	Hungary	Gábor Pulay	13 July 1993 (age 33)	Right Back
7	Spain	Oscar Rio Rasillo	21 July 1980 (age 46)	Central Back
8	Hungary	Ákos Kis	31 December 1975 (age 50)	Left Back
9	Hungary	Bence Bánhidi	9 February 1995 (age 31)	Line Player
10	Hungary	Gábor Lelkes	17 May 1982 (age 44)	Right Back
13	Hungary	Koppány Törteli	2 October 1994 (age 31)	Central Back
14	Hungary	Balázs Szöllősi	24 October 1992 (age 33)	Central Back
15	Hungary	István Pásztor	5 June 1971 (age 55)	Left Winger
16	Hungary	János Szathmári	25 March 1969 (age 57)	Goalkeeper
17	Hungary	György Kovács	23 February 1984 (age 42)	Line Player
18	Hungary	Csaba Tombor	14 April 1979 (age 47)	Right Winger
19	Hungary	Péter Hornyák	4 October 1995 (age 30)	Right Winger
20	Croatia	Josip Šandrk	27 April 1987 (age 39)	Left Back
22	Hungary	Rudolf Faluvégi	9 January 1994 (age 32)	Left Back
23	Hungary	László Kemény	23 February 1993 (age 33)	Line Player
29	Hungary	Bence Zdolik	16 May 1992 (age 34)	Left Back
33	Russia	Aleksey Grigoriev	19 February 1983 (age 43)	Right Back
44	Hungary	Bendegúz Bóka	2 October 1993 (age 32)	Left Winger

== Top scorers ==
Season	Player	Apps/Goals
2004–2005	(Hungary) Bence Szöllősi	26/134
2005–2006	(Hungary) Bence Szöllősi	26/179
2006–2007	(Hungary) Dávid Gelley	26/189
2007–2008	(Hungary) Csaba Tombor	26/181
2008–2009	(Hungary) Csaba Tombor	31/184
2009–2010	(Hungary) Csaba Tombor	27/147
2010–2011	(Hungary) István Pásztor	30/175
2011–2012	(Croatia) Josip Šandrk	23/128
2012–2013	(Hungary) Bence Zdolik	25/136
2013–2014	(Hungary) Balázs Szöllősi	29/147
2014–2015	(Hungary) Balázs Szöllősi	28/125
2015–2016	(Hungary) Balázs Szöllősi	33/121
2016–2017	(Hungary) Mátyás Győri	25/158
2017–2018	(Hungary) Péter Hornyák	26/97
2018–2019	(Hungary) Dominik Máthé	26/115
2019–2020	Cancelled	
2020–2021	(Hungary) Balázs Szöllősi	24/132
2021–2022	(Hungary) Balázs Szöllősi	25/158
2022–2023	(Serbia) Stevan Sretenović	26/101
2023–2024	(Hungary) Márton Varga	26/96
2024–2025	(Slovenia) Tim Rozman	24/101
2025–2026	(Slovenia) Tim Rozman	24/124

== Honours ==
Honours		No.	Years
League
Nemzeti Bajnokság I	Third Place	3	2011–12, 2013–14, 2021–22
Nemzeti Bajnokság I/B	Runners-up	5	2000–01, 2003–04, 2004–05, 2005–06, 2006–07
Nemzeti Bajnokság I/B	Third Place	1	1999-00
Domestic Cups
Magyar Kupa	Third Place	5	2009–10, 2015–16, 2017–18, 2018–19, 2020–21
Best European Results
EHF Cup Winners' Cup	Round Of 16	1	2010–11
EHF European League (EHF Cup) (IHF Cup)	Group Stage	3	2014–15, 2018–19, 2022–23

=== Individual awards ===
==== Domestic ====
Nemzeti Bajnokság I Top Scorer

Season	Name	Goals
2016–17	(Hungary) Mátyás Győri	158

== Seasons ==
=== Season to season ===
As of 04/07/2025

- Seasons in Nemzeti Bajnokság I: 18
- Seasons in Nemzeti Bajnokság I/B: 11
- Seasons in Nemzeti Bajnokság II: 2

Season	Tier	Division	Place	Magyar Kupa
1992–93	3	NB II Délnyugat	12th	
1993–94	4	MB I Veszprém	2nd	
1994–95	3	NB II Északnyugat	2nd	
1995–96	3	NB II Északnyugat	1st	
1996–97	2	NB I/B Nyugat	2nd	
1997–98	2	NB I/B Nyugat	5th	
1998–99	2	NB I/B Nyugat	4th	
1999–00	2	NB I/B Nyugat	3rd	
2000–01	2	NB I/B Nyugat	2nd	

Season	Tier	Division	Place	Magyar Kupa
2001–02	2	NB I/B Nyugat	6th	
2002–03	2	NB I/B Nyugat	4th	
2003–04	2	NB I/B Nyugat	2nd	
2004–05	2	NB I/B Nyugat	2nd	
2005–06	2	NB I/B Nyugat	2nd	
2006–07	2	NB I/B Nyugat	2nd	
2007–08	1	NB I	10th	
2008–09	1	NB I	5th	
2009–10	1	NB I	7th	Third place

Season	Tier	Division	Place	Magyar Kupa
2010–11	1	NB I	5th	Round 4
2011–12	1	NB I	Third place	Fourth place
2012–13	1	NB I	7th	Round 4
2013–14	1	NB I	Third place	Round 4
2014–15	1	NB I	5th	Quarter-finals
2015–16	1	NB I	4th	Third place
2016–17	1	NB I	6th	Quarter-finals
2017–18	1	NB I	4th	Third place
2018–19	1	NB I	4th	Third place
2019–20	1	NB I	Cancelled due COVID-19	
2020–21	1	NB I	4th	Third place
2021–22	1	NB I	Third place	Round 4
2022–23	1	NB I	5th	Round 4
2023–24	1	NB I	8th	Round 4
2024–25	1	NB I	5th	Round 3
2025–26	1	NB I	5th	Round 5

=== European competition ===
EHF Cup Winners' Cup: from the 2012–13 season, the men's competition was merged with the EHF Cup.
EHF Cup: It was formerly known as the IHF Cup until 1993. Also, starting from the 2012–13 season the competition has been merged with the EHF Cup Winners' Cup. The competition will be known as the EHF European League from the 2020–21 season.

Competition	Round	Club	Home	Away	Aggregate
2010–11 EHF Cup Winners' Cup	Third round	(Moldova) HC Olimpus-85 Chișinău	27–16	28–19	55–35
2010–11 EHF Cup Winners' Cup	Round of 16	Tremblay en France	20–20	27–29	47–49
2011–12 EHF Cup	Second round	(Luxembourg) HC Berchem	25–23	31–23	56–46
2011–12 EHF Cup	Third round	(France) Dunkerque HB Grand Littoral	27–26	21–31	48–56
2012–13 EHF Cup	First round	(Estonia) HC Kehra	24–25	27–22	51–47
2012–13 EHF Cup	Second round	(Serbia) RK Vojvodina	27–24	25–29	52–53
2014–15 EHF Cup	Second qualifying round	(Russia) Dinamo Astrakhan	21–23	25–20	46–43
2014–15 EHF Cup	Third qualifying round	(Austria) Alpla HC Hard	26–18	26–31	52–49
2014–15 EHF Cup	Group stage (Group D)	(Germany) MT Melsungen	24–30	23–29	4th
2014–15 EHF Cup	Group stage (Group D)	(Sweden) Eskilstuna Guif	23–26	24–24	4th
2014–15 EHF Cup	Group stage (Group D)	(Croatia) Nexe Našice	19–31	27–26	4th
2016–17 EHF Cup	Second qualifying round	(Switzerland) Pfadi Winterthur	28–23	20–27	48–50
2017–18 EHF Cup	Second qualifying round	(Iceland) Valur FC	27–22	28–19	55–41
2017–18 EHF Cup	Third qualifying round	(Spain) Fraikin BM. Granollers	25–27	21–28	46–55
2018–19 EHF Cup	Third qualifying round	(Czech Republic) HC Baník Karviná	32–29	34–33	66–62
2018–19 EHF Cup	Group stage (Group A)	(Germany) Füchse Berlin	24–29	23–36	4th
2018–19 EHF Cup	Group stage (Group A)	(Spain) Naturhouse La Rioja	35–34	24–29	4th
2018–19 EHF Cup	Group stage (Group A)	(France) Saint-Raphaël Var Handball	27–32	23–27	4th
2019–20 EHF Cup	Third qualifying round	(Spain) ABANCA Ademar León	30–27	21–29	51–56
2020–21 EHF European League	Second qualifying round	(Slovenia) RK Trimo Trebnje	x	22–23	22–23
2021–22 EHF European League	First qualifying round	(Sweden) HK Malmö	27–25	20–22	47–47 (a)
2022–23 EHF European League	Group stage (Group C)	(Denmark) Skjern Håndbold	28–31	26–32	6th
2022–23 EHF European League	Group stage (Group C)	(Spain) Fraikin Granollers	25–30	30–33	6th
2022–23 EHF European League	Group stage (Group C)	(Portugal) Sporting CP	25–31	32–35	6th
2022–23 EHF European League	Group stage (Group C)	(Croatia) RK Nexe Našice	28–31	23–37	6th
2022–23 EHF European League	Group stage (Group C)	(Austria) Alpla HC Hard	27–26	30–30	6th
2025–26 EHF European Cup	R1	(Turkey) Beykoz Belediyespor	43–20	42–18	85–38
2025–26 EHF European Cup	R2	(Azerbaijan) Kür HK	42–19	39–20	81–39
2025–26 EHF European Cup	R3	(Austria) Handballclub Fivers Margareten	32–29	34–31	66–60
2025–26 EHF European Cup	Round of 16	(Czech Republic) HCB Karviná	27–28	28–30	55–58

Season	Competition	Round	Club	Home	Away	Aggregate
2025–26	EHF European Cup	R1	(Turkey) Beykoz Belediyespor	43–20	42–18	85–38
2025–26	EHF European Cup	R2	(Azerbaijan) Kür HK	42–19	39–20	81–39
2025–26	EHF European Cup	R3	(Austria) Handballclub Fivers Margareten	32–29	34–31	66–60
2025–26	EHF European Cup	Round of 16	(Czech Republic) HCB Karviná	27–28	28–30	55–58

==== European record ====
As of 04/04/2026:

Competition	Seasons	Year(s) in the competition
EHF European League (EHF Cup)	12x	2011/12, 2012/13, 2014/15, 2016/17, 2017/18, 2018/19, 2019/20, 2020/21, 2021/22, 2022/23
EHF European Cup (City Cup), (Challenge Cup)	1x	2025/26
EHF Cup Winners' Cup (defunct)	1x	2010/11
Source: kézitörténelem.hu	12 seasons	

Statistics: matches played: 59 – wins: 25 – draws: 3 – losses: 31 – goals scored: 1,599 – goals conceded: 1,576

==== Overall results by opponent and country ====
As of 04/04/2026

Country	Club	P	W	D	L	GF	GA	GD
Austria	Alpla HC Hard	4	2	1	1	109	105	4
Austria	Handballclub Fivers Margareten	2	2	0	0	66	60	6
Subtotal		6	4	1	1	175	165	10
Azerbaijan	Kür HK	2	2	0	0	81	39	42
Subtotal		4	2	0	0	81	39	42
Croatia	Nexe Našice	4	1	0	3	97	125	−28
Subtotal		4	1	0	3	97	125	-28
Czech Republic	HC Baník Karviná	4	2	0	2	121	120	1
Subtotal		4	2	0	2	121	120	1
Denmark	Skjern Håndbold	2	0	0	2	54	63	−9
Subtotal		2	0	0	2	54	63	−9
Estonia	HC Kehra	2	1	0	1	51	47	4
Subtotal		2	1	0	1	51	47	4
France	US Dunkerque HB	2	1	0	1	48	56	−8
France	Saint-Raphaël Var Handball	2	0	0	2	50	59	−9
France	Tremblay en France	2	0	1	1	47	49	−2
Subtotal		6	1	1	4	145	164	-19
Germany	Füchse Berlin	2	0	0	2	47	65	−18
Germany	MT Melsungen	2	0	0	2	47	59	−12
Subtotal		4	0	0	4	94	124	-30
Iceland	Valur FC	2	2	0	0	55	41	14
Subtotal		2	2	0	0	55	41	14
Luxembourg	HC Berchem	2	2	0	0	56	46	10
Subtotal		2	2	0	0	56	46	10
Moldova	HC Olimpus-85 Chișinău	2	2	0	0	55	35	20
Subtotal		2	2	0	0	55	35	20
Portugal	Sporting CP	2	0	0	2	57	66	−9
Subtotal		2	0	0	2	57	66	-9
Russia	Dinamo Astrakhan	2	1	0	1	46	43	3
Subtotal		2	1	0	1	46	43	3
Serbia	RK Vojvodina	2	1	0	1	52	53	−1
Subtotal		2	1	0	1	52	53	-1
Slovenia	RK Trimo Trebnje	1	0	0	1	22	23	−1
Subtotal		1	0	0	1	22	23	-1
Spain	ABANCA Ademar León	2	1	0	1	51	56	−5
Spain	Fraikin BM. Granollers	4	0	0	4	101	118	−17
Spain	Naturhouse La Rioja	2	1	0	1	59	63	−4
Subtotal		8	2	0	6	211	237	-26
Sweden	Eskilstuna Guif	2	0	1	1	47	50	−3
Sweden	HK Malmö	2	1	0	1	47	47	0
Subtotal		4	1	1	2	94	97	-3
Switzerland	Pfadi Winterthur	2	1	0	1	48	50	−2
Subtotal		2	1	0	1	48	50	-2
Turkey	Beykoz Belediyespor	2	2	0	0	85	38	47
Subtotal		2	2	0	0	85	38	47
		P	W	D	L	GF	GA	GD
Total		59	25	3	31	1599	1576	23

==== EHF ranking ====
Last updated on 27/06/2026

Rank	Team	Points
60	(Slovakia) HT Tatran Prešov	70
61	(Czech Republic) SKKP Handball Brno	69
62	(Denmark) Mors-Thy Håndbold	67
63	(Hungary) Balatonfüredi KSE	67
64	(Spain) Balonmano Torrelavega	64
65	(Austria) Handballclub Fivers Margareten	63
66	(Ukraine) HC Motor Zaporizhzhia	63

== Records ==
=== Most appearances in international cups ===
Last updated on 27/06/2026

Rank	Name	Apps	Goals
1	(Hungary) Balázs Németh	38	42
2	(Hungary) Bendegúz Bóka	34	76
3	(Hungary) Balázs Szöllősi	31	98
4	(Hungary) Péter Hornyák	30	77
5	(Hungary) László Kemény	29	50
6	(Hungary) Bence Zdolik	19	82
6	(Hungary) Márton Varga	19	47
7	(Hungary) Tibor Gerdán	18	0
7	(Hungary) Arián Andó	18	0
8	(Serbia) Stevan Sretenović	17	71
9	(Hungary) (Croatia) Petar Topic	14	57
9	(Hungary) Dominik Máthé	14	56
9	(Russia) Yury Semenov	14	47
10	(Hungary) Rudolf Faluvégi	13	26

=== Most goals in international cups ===
Last updated on 27/06/2026

Rank	Name	Apps	Goals
1	(Hungary) Balázs Szöllősi	31	98
2	(Hungary) Bence Zdolik	19	82
3	(Hungary) Péter Hornyák	30	77
4	(Hungary) Bendegúz Bóka	34	76
5	(Serbia) Stevan Sretenović	17	71
6	(Hungary) (Croatia) Petar Topic	14	57
7	(Hungary) Dominik Máthé	14	56
8	(Hungary) László Kemény	29	50
9	(Serbia) Milan Gostović	7	47
9	(Croatia) Josip Šandrk	12	47
9	(Russia) Yury Semenov	14	47
9	(Hungary) Márton Varga	19	47
10	(Hungary) Balázs Németh	38	42

== Former club members ==
=== Notable former players ===
Criteria

To appear in this section a player must have either:

- Played at least one official international match for their national team at any time.
- Or spent at least 10 years with the team.

==== Goalkeepers ====
- (Hungary) Arián Andó (2015–2025)
- (Hungary) Ádám Borbély (2014–2015)
- (Hungary) Dániel Bősz
- (Hungary) Zsolt Cziráki
- (Hungary) Nándor Fazekas (2015–2020)
- (Hungary) János Szathmári (2007–2013)
- (Hungary) Márton Székely (2013–2015)
- (Hungary) (Slovakia) Mihály Tóth (2021–2023)
- (Montenegro) (Serbia) Radivoje Ristanović (2016–2017)

==== Right wingers ====
- (Hungary) Péter Gulyás (2003–2005)
- (Hungary) Péter Hornyák (2011–2013, 2017–2019, 2022–)
- (Hungary) Tamás Iváncsik (2014–2015)
- (Hungary) (Spain) Pedro Rodríguez Álvarez (2019–2022)
- (Hungary) Csaba Tombor (2007–2013)
- (Dominican Republic) Mateo Dioris

==== Left wingers ====
- (Hungary) Tamás Bene
- (Hungary) László Béres
- (Hungary) Bendegúz Bóka (2011–2016, 2017–)
- (Hungary) Péter Kovacsics (2014–2015)
- (Hungary) István Pásztor (2008–2014)
- (Hungary) Milán Varsandán (2016–2018)
- (Ukraine) (Hungary) Igor Zubjuk

==== Line players ====
- (Hungary) Bence Bánhidi (2012–2016)
- (Hungary) Dávid Debreczeni (2016–2018)
- (Hungary) Tamás Habuczki
- (Hungary) László Kemény (2010–2014, 2015–2024)
- (Hungary) Timuzsin Schuch (2005–2006)
- (Hungary) Bence Szűcs (2016–2024)
- (Hungary) (Croatia) Petar Topic (2017–2022)
- (Hungary) Huba Vajda (2015–2020, 2022–2023)
- (Hungary) (Serbia) Uroš Vilovski (2007–2008, 2014–2015)
- (Russia) Denis Vasilev (2024–2026)
- (Slovakia) Maroš Čorej
- (Slovakia) Alexander Ivanov

==== Left backs ====
- (Hungary) Rudolf Faluvégi (2012–2015)
- (Hungary) János Frey
- (Hungary) Mátyás Győri (2013–2017)
- (Hungary) Ákos Kis (2008–2015)
- (Hungary) Patrik Ligetvári (2014–2016)
- (Hungary) Árpád Mohácsi (2008–2010)
- (Hungary) Zoltán Szita (2017–2019)
- (Hungary) Bence Szöllősi
- (Hungary) Bence Zdolik (2009–2020)
- (Bosnia and Herzegovina) Tarik Vranac
- (Belarus) Aliaksei Shynkel
- (Brazil) Uelington da Silva (2018–2019)
- (Croatia) Josip Šandrk
- (Montenegro) Aleksandar Glendža (2021)
- (Serbia) Stevan Sretenović (2022–)
- (Serbia) Darko Stevanović (2019–2020)
- (Slovakia) (Hungary) Ottó Kancel (2014–2019)

==== Central backs ====
- (Hungary) Balázs Szöllősi (2012–2016, 2019–2025)

==== Right backs ====
- (Hungary) Dávid Bakos
- (Hungary) Bálint Fekete (2025–)
- (Hungary) János Gyurka
- (Hungary) Attila Kotormán
- (Hungary) Dominik Máthé (2014–2020)
- (Hungary) Zsolt Szobol
- (Bosnia and Herzegovina) Dejan Malinović (2020–2024)
- (Belarus) Artur Karvatski (2017–2019)
- (Czech Republic) Stanislav Kašpárek (2015–2018)
- (North Macedonia) Mihail Petrovski
- (Russia) Aleksey Grigoriev
- (Slovenia) Tadej Kljun (2023–2025)
- (Slovenia) Tim Rozman (2024–)

== Former coaches ==
Seasons	Coach	Country
2007–2010	Mihály Velky	(Hungary)
2009–2014	László Sótonyi	(Hungary)
2014–2020	István Csoknyai	(Hungary)
2020–2024	László György	(Hungary)
2024–	Ákos Kis	(Hungary)
