= Mátyás Győri =

Hungarian handball player (born 1997)

Personal information
- Nationality: Hungarian
- Born: 2 February 1997 (age 29) Debrecen, Hungary
- Height: 1.92 m (6 ft 4 in)

Sport
- Sport: Handball
- Position: Left Back/Central Back
- Current club: Ferencvárosi TC
- Number: 22

Youth career
- Years: Team
- 2007–2010: Békési FKC

Senior clubs
- Years: Team
- 2011–2013: Békési FKC
- 2013–2017: Balatonfüredi KSE
- 2017–2019: Telekom Veszprém
- 2018–2019: → Tatabánya KC (loan)
- 2019–2024: Tatabánya KC
- 2024–: Ferencvárosi TC
National team
Years	Team	Apps	(Gls)
2016–	Hungary	27	(54)
Medal record
Youth European Championship
Silver medal – second place	2014 Poland

Mátyás Győri (born 2 February 1997) is a Hungarian handball player for Ferencvárosi TC and the Hungarian national team.

== Career ==
=== Club ===
He made his debut in the first team in Balatonfüredi KSE in 2013, scoring 11 goals in 9 matches that season. In the 2014–15 season, he made 15 hits in the league in 14 matches and scored 13 goals in the EHF Cup group stage. Meanwhile, he closed above the 7-goal average in the youth team for the second time in a row. It became a stable frame member in the 2015–16 season. On 24 August 2015, it was announced that it had extended its contract until 2019. He did not fulfill his contract with Balatonfüredi KSE, because as it was officially announced in March 2017, he will be a player of Telekom Veszprém from next season, with whom he has a valid contract until the summer of 2021. As a player of Telekom Veszprém, he suffered a serious knee injury in December 2017 at a league match against Csurgói KK, as a result of which he had to be discharged and was left with a delay of several months. Before the 2018–2019 season, it was lent to Grundfos Tatabánya KC. During the preparation period, he suffered a knee injury again, so another six-month omission awaited him. It was built up in March 2019 and returned to the team. He also spent the 2019–2020 season at Grundfos Tatabánya KC, where after his recovery he became a key member of his team in both the championship and the EHF Cup. In April 2020, Grundfos Tatabánya KC announced that it had extended its contract until 2022.

=== National team ===
In 2014, he won a silver medal at the Youth European Championship and was voted the best left back. He was 10th with the Hungarian team at the 2015 World Youth Championship. He also took part in the Junior European Championship in Denmark in 2016, but János Gyurka's team only took 10th place here. He first entered the adult national team at the end of October 2016 and also made a foreign appearance against the Netherlands on 6 November. He was included in the ample framework for the 2017 World Cup, but due to illness, he was unable to begin preparations in time and did not eventually become a member of the tight framework. In July 2017, he was the fifth most successful goal scorer of the Hungarian national team at the Junior World Championship, he finished fourth in the top scorer list with 49 hits and was also chosen as the best centre back of the tournament. In December, he entered Ljubomir Vranjes ample European Championship framework, but was forced to miss several months and lagged behind the continental tournament due to a rupture of the cross ribbon. After his injury, he was a member of the Hungarian national team at the 2020 European Championships.

== Personal life ==
Married, his wife Viktória Győri-Lukács is a Hungarian national handball player. Their twin daughters, Emma and Zoé, were born in December 2025.

== Honours ==
=== National team ===
- Youth European Championship:
  - Silver: 2014

=== Club ===
Balatonfüredi KSE

- Nemzeti Bajnokság I
  - Bronze: 2014
- Magyar Kupa
  - Bronze: 2016

Telekom Veszprém

- Nemzeti Bajnokság I
  - Silver: 2018
- Magyar Kupa
  - Gold: 2018

Grundfos Tatabánya KC

- Nemzeti Bajnokság I
  - Bronze: 2019, 2021, 2023, 2024

Ferencvárosi TC

- Nemzeti Bajnokság I
  - Bronze: 2025

=== Individual ===
- All-Star Left Back of the Youth European Championship: 2014
- All-Star Centre Back of the Junior World Championship: 2017
- Nemzeti Bajnokság I Top Scorer: 2017
- Hungarian Junior Handballer of the Year: 2016, 2017
