= Arián Andó =

Hungarian handball player (born 1999)

Personal information
- Nationality: Hungarian
- Born: 29 January 1999 (age 27) Pásztó, Hungary
- Height: 1.90 m (6 ft 3 in)

Sport
- Sport: Handball
- Position: Goalkeeper
- Current club: MOL Tatabánya KC
- Number: 21

Youth career
- Years: Team
- 2012–2014: Pásztói KC
- 2014-2015: B. Braun Gyöngyös

Senior clubs
- Years: Team
- 2015–2025: Balatonfüredi KSE
- 2025–: MOL Tatabánya KC
National team
Years	Team	Apps	(Gls)
2023–	Hungary	11	(0)
- Updated on 17 December 2025

Arián Andó (born 29 January 1999) is a Hungarian handball player who plays for MOL Tatabánya KC and the Hungary national team.

== Career ==
=== Club ===
Arián started his career at Pásztói KC. After that, he spent 1 years in the Gyöngyösi KK youth teams. In 2015, he transferred to the Nemzeti Bajnokság I Balatonfüredi KSE. In the 2015/16 season, he was able to play 1 game in the adult team of Balatonfüredi KSE: on 13 March 2016, in the Balatonfüredi KSE-PLER-Budapest match. Balatonfüredi KSE defeated PLER-Budapest by 31:25. He made his debut in the EHF Cup in the 2017/18 season. With the Balatonfüredi KSE team, he won the bronze medal in Nemzeti Bajnokság I in 2022, and in the Hungarian Cup he won the bronze medal three times (2018, 2019, 2021). In the summer of 2025, he transferred to MOL Tatabánya KC. In 2026, the team reached the final of the Hungarian Cup, but were defeated there by ONE Veszprém.

=== National team ===
As a member of the junior national team, he participated in the 2018 Junior European Championship where the Hungarian team became the 11th. He debuted for the Hungarian national team on 9 March 2023, against Switzerland. He was also a member of the 2020 European Men's Handball Championship squad, but he did not play in a single match at the European Championship. He was included in the large squad of the 2021 World Men's Handball Championship, but in the end he will not become a member of the narrow squad. He was also a member of the 2022 European Men's Handball Championship squad, but in the end he will not become a member of the narrow squad. He made his debut in the senior national team on 9 March 2023, in Schaffhausen, in the European qualifying match against the Switzerland men's national handball team: Switzerland–Hungary 32–37. He also participated in the 2024 European Men's Handball Championship as a member of the Hungary men's national handball team. (5th place, 2 games / 0 goals). He was included in the large squad of the 2025 World Men's Handball Championship, but in the end he will not become a member of the narrow squad. He was also a member of the 2026 European Men's Handball Championship squad, but he did not play in a single match at the European Championship.

== Honours ==
=== Club ===
Balatonfüredi KSE

- Nemzeti Bajnokság I:
  - Bronze: 2022
- Magyar Kupa:
  - Bronze: 2018, 2019, 2021

MOL Tatabánya KC

- EHF European Cup:
  - Silver: 2026
- Nemzeti Bajnokság I:
  - Bronze: 2026
- Magyar Kupa
  - Silver: 2026
