= Dominik Máthé =

Hungarian handball player (born 1999)

Personal information
- Nationality: Hungarian
- Born: 1 April 1999 (age 27) Nyíregyháza, Hungary
- Height: 2.01 m (6 ft 7 in)

Sport
- Sport: Handball
- Position: Right back
- Current club: Elverum Håndball
- Number: 23

Senior clubs
- Years: Team
- 2013–2014: PLER KC
- 2014–2020: Balatonfüredi KSE
- 2020–2022: Elverum Håndball
- 2022–2024: Paris Saint-Germain
- 2025–2026: Elverum Håndball
- 2026–: GRK Ohrid
National team
Years	Team	Apps	(Gls)
2019–	Hungary	45	(146)
- Updated on 1 July 2025

Dominik Máthé (born 1 April 1999) is a Hungarian handball player who plays for Elverum Håndball and the Hungarian national team.

He represented Hungary at the 2019 World Men's Handball Championship, the 2020 European Men's Handball Championship and the 2021 World Men's Handball Championship.

== Individual awards ==
- Hungarian Junior Handballer of the Year: 2018
