= Darko Stevanović =

Serbian handball player (born 1997)

Personal information
- Nationality: Serbian
- Born: 3 January 1997 (age 29) Lazarevac, Serbia, FR Yugoslavia
- Height: 1.96 m (6 ft 5 in)

Sport
- Sport: Handball
- Position: Left back
- Current club: Sakarya
- Number: 19

Senior clubs
- Years: Team
- –2019: RK Partizan
- 2019–2020: Balatonfüredi KSE
- 2020: DVTK-Eger
- 2020–2021: Al Arabi
- 2022: Al Wehda
- 2022–2023: HC Meshkov Brest
- 2023: RK Eurofarm Pelister
- 2024–: Sakarya
National team
Years	Team	Apps	(Gls)
–	Serbia	5	(5)

Darko Stevanović (born 3 January 1997) is a Serbian handball player who plays for Sakarya and the Serbian national team.

He participated at the 2018 European Men's Handball Championship.
