= Huba Vajda =

Hungarian handball player (born 2000)

Personal information
- Nationality: Hungarian
- Born: 5 March 2000 (age 26) Győr, Hungary
- Height: 1.93 m (6 ft 4 in)

Sport
- Sport: Handball
- Position: Pivot
- Current club: MOL Tatabánya KC
- Number: 78

Youth career
- Years: Team
- 2014–2015: SZESE Győr
- 2015–2018: Balatonfüredi KSE

Senior clubs
- Years: Team
- 2018–2023: (Hungary) Balatonfüredi KSE
- 2020–2022: → (Hungary) Veszprém KKFT Felsőörs (loan)
- 2023–2024: (Hungary) MOL-Tatabánya KC
- 2024–2025: (Hungary) Győri ETO-UNI FKC
- 2025–: (Hungary) MOL-Tatabánya KC
National team
Years	Team	Apps	(Gls)
2020–	Hungary	3	(3)

Huba Vajda (born 5 March 2000) is a Hungarian handball player who plays for MOL Tatabánya KC and the Hungarian national team.

== Career ==
=== Club ===
Huba started his career at SZESE Győr. He has played in Balatonfüredi KSE since the beginning of the 2015/16 season. He made his debut in Nemzeti Bajnokság I in the 2018/19 season, scoring 6 goals in 8 games. He played 5 matches in the 2018/19 and 2019/20 seasons of the EHF Cup for Balatonfüredi KSE. From 2020 to 2022, he was loaned to the Veszprém KKFT Felsőörs team. In 2022, the team reached the final of the Hungarian Cup, but were defeated there by Telekom Veszprém. Huba scored 3 goals in the final. He returned to Balatonfüredi KSE for the 2022/23 season. He played here in the EHF European League. He scored 5 goals in 7 games. In the summer of 2023, he transferred to the No. 3 Hungarian team, MOL-Tatabánya KC. From the summer of 2024, he will continue his career at Győri ETO-UNI FKC, which has a long history and returned to the Nemzeti Bajnokság I after a long time. In the summer of 2025, he transferred to MOL Tatabánya KC. In 2026, the team reached the final of the Hungarian Cup, but were defeated there by ONE Veszprém. Huba scored 1 goal in the final.

=== National team ===
He was 10th with the Hungarian team at the 2018 Youth European Championship. He was 5th with the Hungarian team at the 2019 World Youth Championship. He made his debut in the Hungary men's national handball team on November 4, 2020, in the Eurocup match against the Spain men's national handball team: Hungary-Spain 32–29. (scored 1 goals). He was included in the large squad of the 2021 World Men's Handball Championship, but in the end he will not become a member of the narrow squad. He was also a member of the 2022 European Men's Handball Championship squad, but in the end he will not become a member of the narrow squad.

== Honours ==
=== Club ===
Balatonfüredi KSE

- Magyar Kupa
  - Bronze: 2019

Veszprém KKFT Felsőörs

- Magyar Kupa
  - Silver: 2022

MOL Tatabánya KC

- EHF European Cup:
  - Silver: 2026
- Nemzeti Bajnokság I:
  - Bronze: 2024, 2026
- Magyar Kupa
  - Silver: 2026

=== Individual ===
- Hungarian Adolescent Handballer of the Year: 2016
