= 2011–12 Nemzeti Bajnokság I (men's handball) =

Nemzeti Bajnokság I
- Season: 2011–12
- Country: Hungary
- Champions: MKB Veszprém
- Champions League: MKB Veszprém; Pick Szeged
- European Cup: Balatonfüredi KSE; Tatabánya

2011–12 Nemzeti Bajnokság I (men's handball) season.

== Team information ==
Location of teams in the 2011–12 Nemzeti Bajnokság I

Team	Location	Arena	Capacity
Balatonfüredi KSE	Balatonfüred	Balaton Szabadidő és Konferencia Központ	712
Csurgói KK	Csurgó	Városi Sportcsarnok	800
Ferencvárosi TC	Budapest	Főtáv FTC Kézilabda Aréna	1,300
Gyöngyösi KK	Gyöngyös	Városi Sportcsarnok	1,600
Kecskemét SE	Kecskemét	Messzi István Sportcsarnok	1,200
Mezőkövesdi KC	Mezőkövesd	Városi Sportcsarnok	800
Orosházi FKSE	Orosháza	Városi Sportcsarnok	600
Pécsi VSE	Pécs	Lauber Dezső Sportcsarnok	3,000
Pick Szeged	Szeged	Városi Sportcsarnok	3,200
Tatai Honvéd AC	Tata		
Tatabánya KC	Tatabánya	Földi Imre Sportcsarnok	1,000
MKB Veszprém	Veszprém	Veszprém Aréna	5,096

== Regular season ==
=== Standings ===
	Team	Pld	W	D	L	GF	GA	Diff	Pts
1	MKB Veszprém	22	21	0	1	829	539	+290	42
2	Pick Szeged	22	19	1	2	693	526	+167	39
3	Csurgói KK	22	15	2	5	631	583	+48	32
4	Balatonfüred KSE	22	13	2	7	596	558	+38	28
5	Tatabánya KC	22	14	0	8	641	567	+74	28
6	Gyöngyösi KK	22	9	2	11	616	626	−10	20
7	Ferencvárosi TC	22	8	1	13	598	611	−13	17
8	Kecskemét SE	22	8	1	13	592	651	−59	17
9	Pécsi VSE	22	7	2	13	627	730	−103	16
10	Orosházi FKSE	22	5	1	16	577	678	−101	11
11	Mezőkövesdi KC	22	4	0	18	552	674	−122	8
12	Tatai Honvéd AC	22	3	0	19	541	750	−209	6

Champion Playoff
5 to 8 Playoff
Relegation Round

Pld - Played; W - Won; L - Lost; PF - Points for; PA - Points against; Diff - Difference; Pts - Points.

=== Results ===
In the table below the home teams are listed on the left and the away teams along the top.

	BAL	CSU	FTC	GYÖ	KSE	MEZ	ORO	PSE	SZE	HAC	TAT	VES
Balatonfüred		21–20	32–23	26–25	32–28	27–18	30–26	39–24	22–23	36–24	23–22	25–33
Csurgó	24–24		32–26	30–28	33–25	34–27	26–24	32–29	29–29	40–23	20–29	26–36
Ferencváros	24–18	22–27		26–24	20–20	26–29	32–21	44–26	23–29	32–24	23–24	27–31
Gyöngyös	25–33	21–23	28–27		31–23	25–20	33–25	33–32	29–32	30–21	27–26	31–37
Kecskemét	27–23	26–29	21–27	32–26		29–25	32–30	37–26	25–31	32–29	28–34	25–37
Mezőkövesd	24–25	20–28	22–31	19–25	31–30		30–26	32–36	20–29	33–27	23–32	28–40
Orosháza	30–27	29–33	28–26	30–30	26–27	32–25		37–35	19–34	33–24	23–33	26–37
Pécs	28–28	23–34	34–30	33–33	30–29	28–23	26–25		31–39	32–24	24–32	21–38
Szeged	33–18	36–26	35–18	28–23	26–24	42–27	33–23	42–29		44–24	28–17	24–23
Tata	19–39	24–38	27–33	31–42	24–30	29–24	30–21	26–24	16–29		26–37	26–38
Tatabánya	23–25	21–26	37–29	35–21	40–24	29–26	31–22	31–35	27–19	38–19		21–34
Veszprém	35–23	40–21	42–29	43–21	41–18	44–26	44–21	42–21	33–28	45–24	42–22	

== Champion play-off ==
=== Semifinals ===
Team 1	Score	Team 2
MKB Veszprém	2 – 0	Balatonfüredi KSE

20 April 2012; 18:00	MKB Veszprém	30 – 28	Balatonfüredi KSE	Veszprém Aréna, Veszprém; Attendance: 2,400; Referees: Medve, Nagy
20 April 2012; 18:00	Sulić 9	(16–17)	Pásztor 8	Veszprém Aréna, Veszprém; Attendance: 2,400; Referees: Medve, Nagy
20 April 2012; 18:00	2× (yellow card) 1× (suspension)	Report	3× (yellow card) 5× (suspension)	Veszprém Aréna, Veszprém; Attendance: 2,400; Referees: Medve, Nagy

28 April 2012; 18:00	Balatonfüredi KSE	22 – 39	MKB Veszprém	Balaton Szabadidő és Konferencia Központ, Balatonfüred; Attendance: 600; Referees: Ágnecz, Sipos
28 April 2012; 18:00	Pásztor 5	(10–19)	Császár 9	Balaton Szabadidő és Konferencia Központ, Balatonfüred; Attendance: 600; Referees: Ágnecz, Sipos
28 April 2012; 18:00	3× (yellow card) 6× (suspension)	Report	2× (yellow card) 3× (suspension)	Balaton Szabadidő és Konferencia Központ, Balatonfüred; Attendance: 600; Referees: Ágnecz, Sipos

Team 1	Score	Team 2
Pick Szeged	2 – 0	Csurgói KK

22 April 2012; 18:00	Pick Szeged	27 – 26	Csurgói KK	Városi Sportcsarnok, Szeged; Attendance: 1,500; Referees: Nagy, Túróczy
22 April 2012; 18:00	Prodanović 10	(13–13)	Oláh 6	Városi Sportcsarnok, Szeged; Attendance: 1,500; Referees: Nagy, Túróczy
22 April 2012; 18:00	3× (yellow card) 6× (suspension) 1× (red card)	Report	3× (yellow card) 6× (suspension)	Városi Sportcsarnok, Szeged; Attendance: 1,500; Referees: Nagy, Túróczy

28 April 2012; 12:45	Csurgói KK	20 – 28	Pick Szeged	Városi Sportcsarnok, Csurgó; Attendance: 900; Referees: Bonifert, Oláh
28 April 2012; 12:45	Széles 5	(9–13)	Šulc 7	Városi Sportcsarnok, Csurgó; Attendance: 900; Referees: Bonifert, Oláh
28 April 2012; 12:45	3× (yellow card) 4× (suspension)	Report	2× (yellow card) 4× (suspension)	Városi Sportcsarnok, Csurgó; Attendance: 900; Referees: Bonifert, Oláh

=== 3rd Place ===
Team 1	Score	Team 2
Csurgói KK	0 – 2	Balatonfüredi KSE

5 May 2012; 18:00	Csurgói KK	28 – 29	Balatonfüredi KSE	Városi Sportcsarnok, Csurgó; Attendance: 1,000; Referees: Herczeg, Südi
5 May 2012; 18:00	Oláh 11	(16–14)	Pásztor 9	Városi Sportcsarnok, Csurgó; Attendance: 1,000; Referees: Herczeg, Südi
5 May 2012; 18:00	2× (yellow card) 3× (suspension)	Report	3× (yellow card) 7× (suspension)	Városi Sportcsarnok, Csurgó; Attendance: 1,000; Referees: Herczeg, Südi

13 May 2012; 18:00	Balatonfüredi KSE	26 – 20	Csurgói KK	Balaton Szabadidő és Konferencia Központ, Balatonfüred; Attendance: 900; Referees: Kékes, Kékes
13 May 2012; 18:00	Butenko 10	(11–9)	Széles 4	Balaton Szabadidő és Konferencia Központ, Balatonfüred; Attendance: 900; Referees: Kékes, Kékes
13 May 2012; 18:00		Report		Balaton Szabadidő és Konferencia Központ, Balatonfüred; Attendance: 900; Referees: Kékes, Kékes

=== Finals ===
Team 1	Score	Team 2
MKB Veszprém	2 – 1	Pick Szeged

6 May 2012; 12:00	MKB Veszprém	33 – 22	Pick Szeged	Veszprém Aréna, Veszprém; Attendance: 4,800; Referees: Dobrovits, Tájok
6 May 2012; 12:00	Vujin 7	(18–12)	three players 5	Veszprém Aréna, Veszprém; Attendance: 4,800; Referees: Dobrovits, Tájok
6 May 2012; 12:00	2× (yellow card) 6× (suspension)	Report	2× (yellow card) 2× (suspension)	Veszprém Aréna, Veszprém; Attendance: 4,800; Referees: Dobrovits, Tájok

13 May 2012; 12:00	Pick Szeged	24 – 23	MKB Veszprém	Városi Sportcsarnok, Szeged; Attendance: 3,500; Referees: Bonifert, Oláh
13 May 2012; 12:00	Prodanović 8	(11–10)	Pérez 8	Városi Sportcsarnok, Szeged; Attendance: 3,500; Referees: Bonifert, Oláh
13 May 2012; 12:00	3× (yellow card) 1× (suspension) 2× (red card)	Report	3× (yellow card) 6× (suspension)	Városi Sportcsarnok, Szeged; Attendance: 3,500; Referees: Bonifert, Oláh

19 May 2012; 12:45	MKB Veszprém	29 – 21	Pick Szeged	Veszprém Aréna, Veszprém; Attendance: 5,000; Referees: Dobrovits, Tájok
19 May 2012; 12:45	Vujin 8	(17–14)	Prodanović 6	Veszprém Aréna, Veszprém; Attendance: 5,000; Referees: Dobrovits, Tájok
19 May 2012; 12:45		Report		Veszprém Aréna, Veszprém; Attendance: 5,000; Referees: Dobrovits, Tájok

=== Final standings ===
	Team	Pld	W	D	L	GF	GA	Diff	Pts	Qualification
1	MKB Veszprém	5	4	0	1	154	117	+37	8	2012–13 EHF Champions League group stage
2	Pick Szeged	5	3	0	2	122	131	−9	6	2012–13 EHF Champions League group stage
3	Balatonfüredi KSE	4	2	0	2	105	117	−12	4	2012–13 EHF European Cup round 2
4	Csurgói KK	4	0	0	4	94	110	−16	0	

Pld - Played; W - Won; L - Lost; PF - Points for; PA - Points against; Diff - Difference; Pts - Points.

== 5 to 8 play-off ==
=== Final standings ===
	Team	Pld	W	D	L	GF	GA	Diff	Pts	Qualification
5	Tatabánya KC	6	5	0	1	195	142	+53	10	2012–13 EHF European Cup round 2
6	Gyöngyösi KK	6	3	1	2	160	136	+24	7	
7	Ferencvárosi TC	6	3	1	2	158	159	−1	7	
8	Kecskemét SE	6	0	0	6	100	176	−76	0	

Pld - Played; W - Won; L - Lost; PF - Points for; PA - Points against; Diff - Difference; Pts - Points.

=== Results ===
In the table below the home teams are listed on the left and the away teams along the top.

	TAT	GYÖ	FTC	KSE
Tatabánya		36–27	30–17	34–16
Gyöngyös	28–29		32–25	10–0^{*}
Ferencváros	32–29	26–26		35–20
Kecskemét	22–37	20–37	22–23	

- ^{*}match awarded

== Relegation round ==
=== Final standings ===
	Team	Pld	W	D	L	GF	GA	Diff	Pts	Relegation
9	Orosházi FKSE	6	6	0	0	189	158	+31	12	
10	Pécsi VSE	6	3	0	3	184	179	+5	6	
11	Mezőkövesdi KC	6	3	0	3	176	167	+9	6	Relegation to the 2012–13 Nemzeti Bajnokság I/B
12	Tatai Honvéd AC	6	0	0	6	160	206	−46	0	Relegation to the 2012–13 Nemzeti Bajnokság I/B

Pld - Played; W - Won; L - Lost; PF - Points for; PA - Points against; Diff - Difference; Pts - Points.

=== Results ===
In the table below the home teams are listed on the left and the away teams along the top.

	PSE	ORO	MEZ	HAC
Pécs		29–30	27–28	35–33
Orosháza	30–25		38–30	32–27
Mezökövesd	28–34	22–23		36–22
Tata	30–34	25–36	23–32	
