= Artur Karvatski =

Latvian-born Belarusian handball player

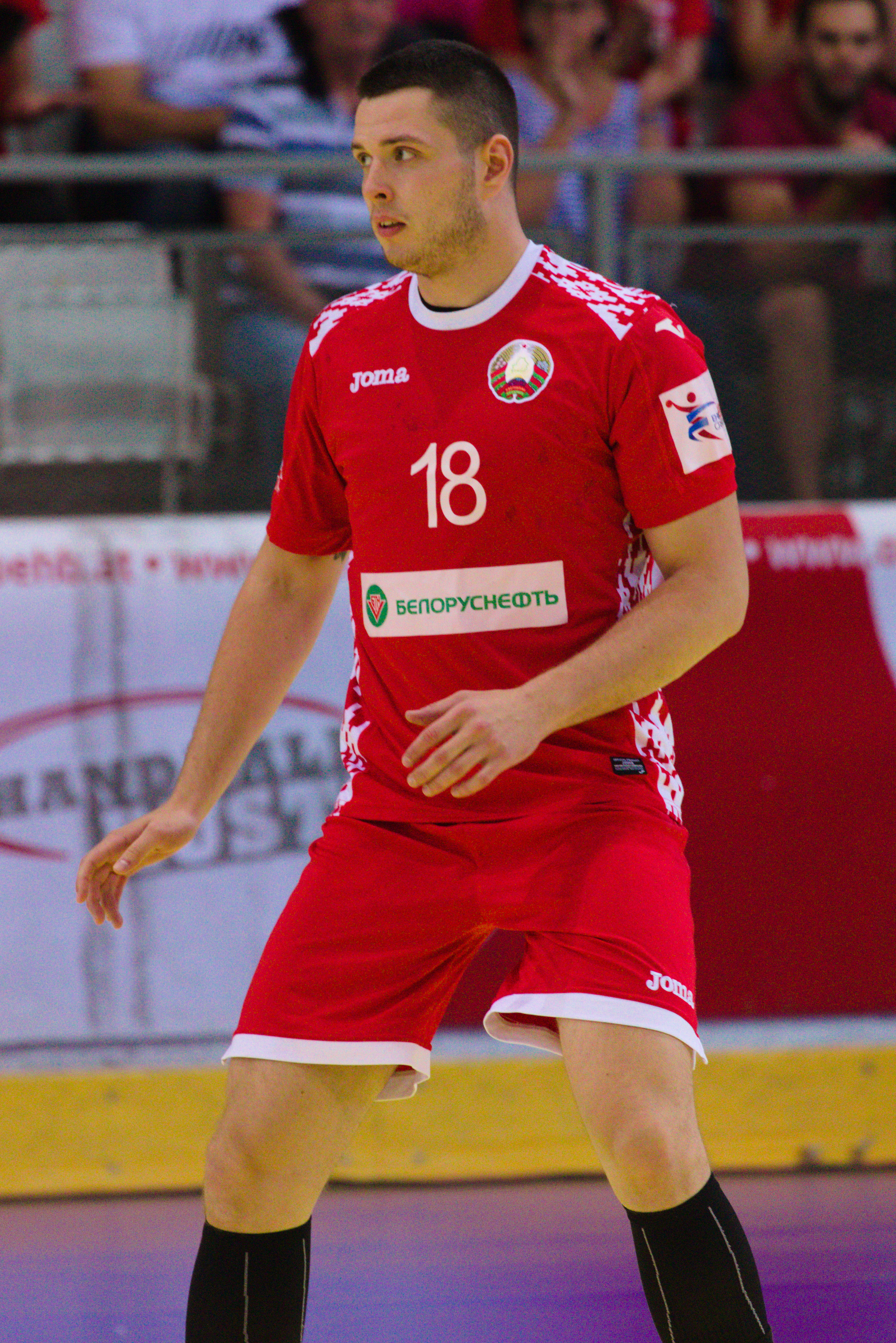

Personal information
- Nationality: Latvian/Belarusian
- Born: 21 January 1996 (age 30) Preiļi, Latvia
- Height: 1.95 m (6 ft 5 in)

Sport
- Sport: Handball
- Position: Right back
- Current club: Olympiacos H.C.
- Number: 81

Senior clubs
- Years: Team
- –2013: (Belarus) Masheka Mogilev
- 2013–2017: (Belarus) SKA Minsk
- 2017–2019: (Hungary) Balatonfüredi KSE
- 2019: (Croatia) RK Zagreb
- 2019–2020: (Greece) Olympiacos H.C.
- 2020–2021: (Switzerland) RTV 1879 Basel
- 2021–: (Russia) Dinamo Viktor Stavropol
National team
Years	Team	Apps	(Gls)
2013–	Belarus	20	(56)

Artur Karvatski (born 21 January 1996) is a Latvian-born Belarusian handball player who plays for Dinamo Viktor Stavropol and the Belarusian national team.

He participated at the 2018 European Men's Handball Championship.

In 2019, Karvatski joined the Greek team the Olympiacos and left the Croatian RK PPD Zagreb.
