= Aleksandar Glendža =

Montenegrin handball player (born 1995)

Personal information
- Full name: Aleksandar Glendža
- Nationality: Montenegrin
- Born: 1 December 1995 (age 30) Budva, FR Yugoslavia
- Height: 1.97 m (6 ft 6 in)

Sport
- Sport: Handball
- Position: Left back
- Current club: Hapoel Rishon LeZion

Senior clubs
- Years: Team
- -2014: Budvanska rivijera
- 2015–2018: Hc Partizan
- 2016: → Jagodina (loan)
- 2018: → Kolubara (loan)
- 2018–2019: RK Leotar
- 2019–2020: Slovenj Gradec
- 2020: UHK Krems
- 2021: Balatonfüredi KSE
- 2021–2023: HC Buzău
- 2023-: Hapoel Rishon LeZion
National team
Years	Team	Apps	(Gls)
2020–	Montenegro	7	(5)

Aleksandar Glendža (born 1 December 1995) is a Montenegrin handball player playing for Israeli club Hapoel Rishon LeZion and the Montenegro national team.

== Club career ==
At club level, Glendža played in Montenegro (Budvanska rivijera), Serbia (Partizan, Jagodina, and Kolubara), Bosnia and Herzegovina (Leotar), Slovenia (Slovenj Gradec), Austria (UHK Krems), Hungary (Balatonfüredi KSE) and Romania (HC Buzău) .

== International career ==
At international level, Glendža represented Montenegro at the 2020 European Championship.
