= Péter Hornyák =

Hungarian handball player (born 1995)

Personal information
- Nationality: Hungarian
- Born: 4 October 1995 (age 31) Debrecen, Hungary
- Height: 1.78 m (5 ft 10 in)

Sport
- Sport: Handball
- Position: Right wing
- Current club: Balatonfüredi KSE
- Number: 47

Youth career
- Years: Team
- 2008–2010: ETO-SZESE Győr FKC

Senior clubs
- Years: Team
- 2010–2011: Dunaferr Alexandra
- 2011–2013: Balatonfüredi KSE
- 2013–2015: TUSEM Essen
- 2015–2017: Csurgói KK
- 2017–2019: Balatonfüredi KSE
- 2019–2022: Grundfos Tatabánya KC
- 2022–: Balatonfüredi KSE
National team
Years	Team	Apps	(Gls)
2015–	Hungary	45	(67)

Péter Hornyák (born 4 October 1995) is a Hungarian handball player for Balatonfüredi KSE and the Hungarian national team.

== Career ==
=== Club ===
In 2011, Péter Hornyák made his debut in Dunaferr Alexandra among adults in Nemzeti Bajnokság I. He then spent two seasons at Balatonfüredi KSE, where he was given more and more opportunities to play. At the age of 18, he was contracted abroad and certified for the German second division team of TUSEM Essen. Here he soon became the team's main man, and he was the team's number one penalty shooter. They were also satisfied with his performance at the club, but after two seasons he was confirmed again to Hungary, the Csurgói KK, mainly due to his homesickness. In both of his seasons in Csurgói KK, he reached the third round of the EHF Cup qualifiers with his team. From the autumn of 2017 he became a player of Balatonfüredi KSE again. He spent two seasons with the Balaton shore team, and from the summer of 2019 he continued his career with Grundfos Tatabánya KC. On September 25, 2021, he suffered a cruciate ligament rupture in the SBS-Eger-Grundfos Tatabánya KC match.

=== National team ===
He was 9th with the Hungarian team at the 2014 Junior European Championship. In the Hungarian national team in 2015 he got a chance in the last two matches of the European Championship qualifying series, and then, after the successful qualification, the first right winger of the national team, Péter Gulyás, was injured shortly before the European Championship, Hornyák took his place in the framework of the 2016 European Men's Handball Championship. He represented Hungary at the 2018 European Men's Handball Championship, 2019 World Men's Handball Championship And 2020 European Men's Handball Championship.

== Honours ==
=== Club ===
Balatonfüredi KSE

- Nemzeti Bajnokság I
  - Bronze: 2012, 2021
- Magyar Kupa
  - Bronze: 2018, 2019

=== Individual ===
- Hungarian Youth Handballer of the Year: 2012
