= Aliaksei Shynkel =

Belarusian handball player

Personal information
- Nationality: Belarusian
- Born: 6 July 1994 (age 32) Grodno, Belarus
- Height: 2.10 m (6 ft 10 1/2 in)

Sport
- Sport: Handball
- Position: Left back
- Current club: HC Meshkov Brest
- Number: 28
National team
Years	Team	Apps	(Gls)
–	Belarus	2	(3)

Aliaksei Shynkel (born 6 July 1994) is a Belarusian handball player for HC Meshkov Brest and the Belarusian national team.

Shynkel participated at the 2017 World Men's Handball Championship.
