= 2Rule =

Hungarian sports clothing brand

- Product type: Sports clothing
- Current owner: Magyar Sportszergyártó
- Country: Hungary
- Introduced: 2018; 8 years ago
- Website: 2rule.hu

2Rule is a Hungarian sports clothing brand. The name is a reference to the mythical Turul bird. It's owned by businessman Lőrinc Mészáros.

== Customers ==
2Rule is the official kit provider for the following sports teams in Europe, nowadays mainly in Hungary.

=== Football ===
- (Croatia) Osijek
- (Slovenia) Nafta 1903
- (Hungary) Budafoki MTE
- (Hungary) Csákvári TK
- (Hungary) Diósgyőri VTK
- (Hungary) Puskás Akadémia FC
- (Hungary) Szombathelyi Haladás
- (Hungary) Tiszakécske FC
- (Hungary) Zalaegerszegi TE
- (Romania) FK Miercurea Ciuc
- (Sweden) Marbäcks IF (away kit)

=== Handball ===
- (Hungary) Balatonfüredi KSE
- (Hungary) Ceglédi KKSE
- (Hungary) Budakalász FKC
- (Hungary) Veszprém KC
