= Dejan Malinović =

Bosnian handball player

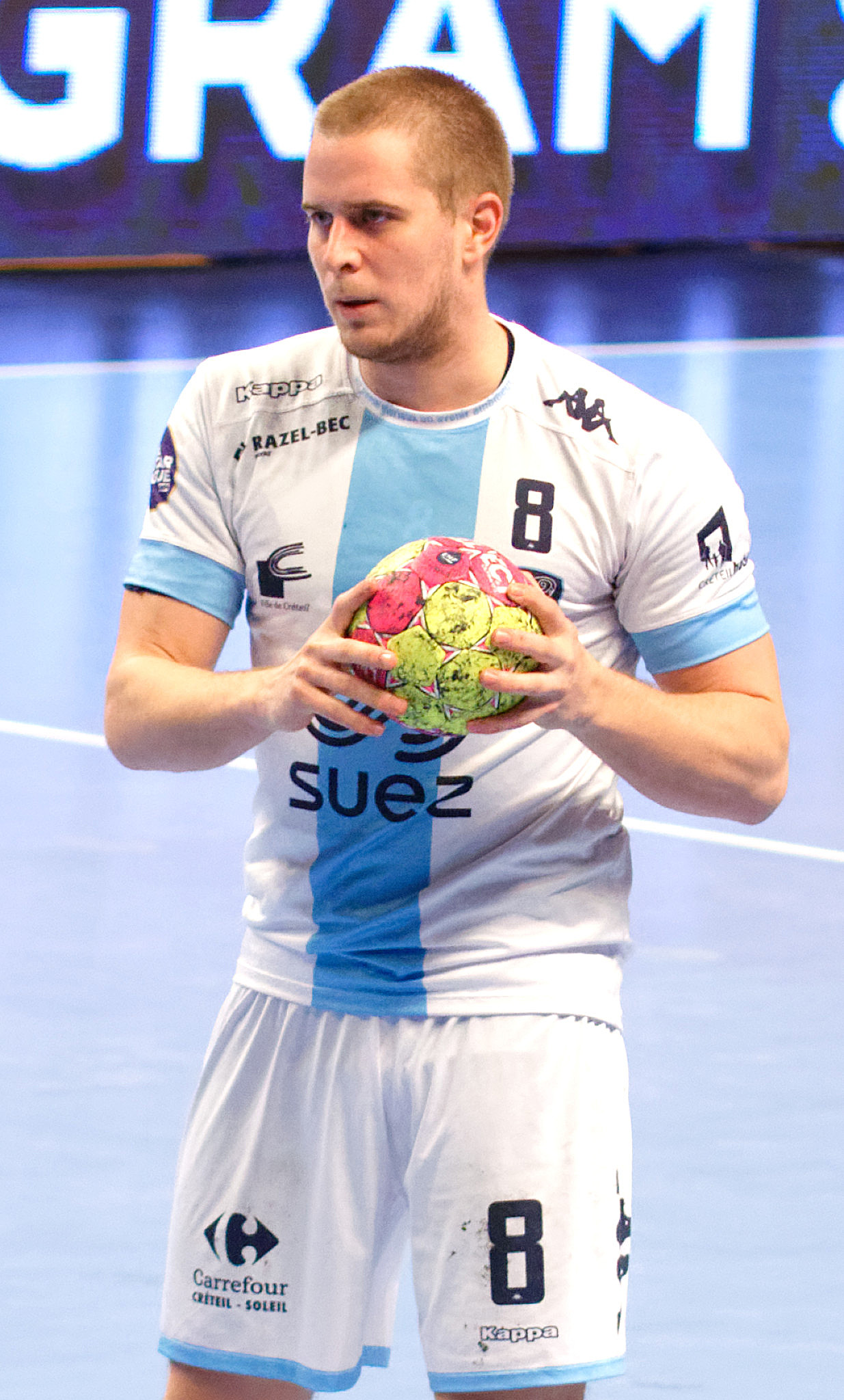

Personal information
- Nationality: Bosnian
- Born: 12 April 1992 (age 34) Banja Luka, SFR Yugoslavia
- Height: 1.95 m (6 ft 5 in)

Sport
- Sport: Handball
- Position: Right back
- Current club: PLER-Budapest
- Number: 44

Senior clubs
- Years: Team
- 2009: (Bosnia and Herzegovina) RK Borac Banja Luka
- 2009–2012: (Bosnia and Herzegovina) RK Izviđač Ljubuški
- 2012: (Bosnia and Herzegovina) RK Borac Banja Luka
- 2012–2013: (Slovenia) RK Maribor Branik
- 2013–2014: (Belarus) HC Meshkov Brest
- 2014–2017: (France) Creteil
- 2017–2020: (Romania) Dobrogea Sud Constanța
- 2020–2024: (Hungary) Balatonfüredi KSE
- 2024–: (Hungary) PLER-Budapest
National team
Years	Team	Apps	(Gls)
2011–	Bosnia and Herzegovina	69	(179)

Dejan Malinović (born 12 April 1992) is a Bosnian handball player for PLER-Budapest and the Bosnian national team.

Malinović previously played for Borac Banja Luka, Izviđač, Maribor, Meshkov Brest, Creteil and HC Dobrogea Sud Constanța. During the WC in Qatar Malinović was considered one of the most talented European right-wing fullbacks. He has been included in the edition of EHF's "RISING STARS OF 2015".

== Club career ==
Malinovic was born in 1992 just after the golden years of RK Borac Banja Luka, who won the Champions Cup in 1976, played in the final of this prestigious competition season later and won the IHF Cup 1991, had come to the end. He also looked up to other local handball players.

"I had no specific idol but one I saw very often was Mladen Bojinovic. He was also born in Banja Luka, so me and the other Banja Luka's kids were trying to achieve his level".

"It is never easy to grow up in the city with a lot of living handball legends. You will always stay in the shadow, no matter how good you play, but there are also a lot of positive sides. For example, I got a lot of useful advice for my sports and private life."

"But the one player I adore the most is (French international) Jerome Fernandez. He is absolutely amazing, a perfect player, a role model for me, and not only for me."

After playing for Banja Luka's youth teams, Malinovic turned his way of life to professional handball when he joined RK Izvidjac in Ljubuski in 2009, where he spent three great seasons and won National Championship and Cup in 2013. For Malinović, time spent at this club stands out as the most important in his career:"I had great coaches, Josip Glavas and Ilija Puljevic among them, who built my sense for handball and corrected a lot of things in my play. I can say that they made the most of what Dejan Malinovic is today."

After a successful games in Ljubuski he signed for RK Maribor Branik where he spent half-season 2013/2014, playing in the EHF Cup. In 2014, in the winter transfer switches to exceed in Belarusian HC Meshkov Brest, and in the 2014/2015 season signed for US Créteil from Paris to compete in the LNH Division 1. During the summer 2017, after three successful years in France, he signed for Romanian HC Dobrogea Sud Constanța. In July 2020. Malinović moved to Hungary, after signing one-year contract with Balatonfuredi KSE.

== National team ==
Dejan has passed all the selections of Bosnia and Herzegovina, from cadets, juniors to the senior team, for which he played 60 matches so far and scored 166 goals. He made his debut in a friendly match against Serbia in Ruma 5 January 2011. Malinovic had Excellent performance at the World Junior Championships in 2013, which was held in Bosnia and Herzegovina. With 29 scored goals he was the third best scorer of his team. BiH juniors qualified for the 1/8 finals and eventually took 14th best junior teams of the world on their debut championship. At World Championships in Qatar, Malinović was the most effective player of Bosnian national team with 30 goals scored. In January 2020 Malinovic played at EHF EURO with Bosnian national team and scored 6 goals in three games.

Playing for the national team of Bosnia and Herzegovina means a lot to him, " We are a family and we are all going to leave our hearts on the ground for Bosnia. Playing for National team means everything to me. We are three are nations, but one soul. We are all born in one country and I think it's finally time to realize it."
