= Bence Szűcs =

Hungarian handball player (born 1999)

Personal information
- Nationality: Hungarian
- Born: 25 May 1999 (age 27) Debrecen, Hungary
- Height: 2.06 m (6 ft 9 in)

Sport
- Sport: Handball
- Position: Pivot
- Current club: MOL Tatabánya KC
- Number: 48

Youth career
- Years: Team
- 2015–2016: Hajdúszoboszlói KSE
- 2016: Balmazújvárosi KK

Senior clubs
- Years: Team
- 2016–2024: (Hungary) Balatonfüredi KSE
- 2019: → (Hungary) Telekom Veszprém (loan)
- 2024–2026: (France) US Dunkerque HB
- 2026–: (Hungary) MOL Tatabánya KC
National team
Years	Team	Apps	(Gls)
2020–	Hungary	8	(9)

Bence Szűcs (born 25 May 1999) is a Hungarian handball player who plays for MOL Tatabánya KC and the Hungary national team.

== Career ==
=== Club ===
Bence started his career at Hajdúszoboszlói KSE. Since January 2016, he has been playing in Balmazújvárosi KK. He has been supporting Balatonfüredi KSE since the 2016/17 season. In February 2019, Telekom Veszprém borrowed Bence, as its player Rene Toft Hansen was injured at the 2019 World Men's Handball Championship, to replace the injured Danish star in Veszprém's star team. He played for the first time on February 12 in the Telekom Veszprém team; confidently defeated the team of Budakalász FKC by 36:17. In this match, Bence spent 12 minutes on the pitch and did not score a goal. At the end of 2019, he decided to return to the Balatonfüredi KSE team. He made his EHF European League debut here in the 2020/21 season. In the EHF European League season 2022/23, he scored 23 goals in 10 matches. From the summer of 2024, he transferred to the French team US Dunkerque HB. After 2 season, he left US Dunkerque HB and signed with MOL Tatabánya KC.

=== National team ===
As a member of the junior national team, he participated in the 2019 Junior World Championship where the Hungarian team became the 15th. He made his debut in the Hungary men's national handball team on November 4, 2020, in the Eurocup match against the Spain men's national handball team: Hungary-Spain 32–29. (scored 3 goals). He was included in the large squad of the 2021 World Men's Handball Championship, but in the end he will not become a member of the narrow squad. He was included in the large squad of the 2024 European Men's Handball Championship, but in the end he will not become a member of the narrow squad. He was included in the large squad of the 2025 World Men's Handball Championship, but in the end he will not become a member of the narrow squad. He was included in the large squad of the 2026 European Men's Handball Championship, but in the end he will not become a member of the narrow squad.

== Honours ==
=== Club ===
Telekom Veszprém

- Nemzeti Bajnokság I
  - Gold: 2019
- Magyar Kupa
  - Silver: 2019

Balatonfüredi KSE

- Nemzeti Bajnokság I:
  - Bronze: 2022
- Magyar Kupa:
  - Bronze: 2021
