= Balázs Szöllősi =

Hungarian handball player (born 1992)

Personal information
- Nationality: Hungarian
- Born: 24 October 1992 (age 33) Veszprém, Hungary
- Height: 1.93 m (6 ft 4 in)

Sport
- Sport: Handball
- Position: Centre back
- Current club: Balatonfüredi KSE
- Number: 14

Senior clubs
- Years: Team
- 2012–2016: Balatonfüredi KSE
- 2016–2019: Grundfos Tatabánya KC
- 2019–2025: Balatonfüredi KSE
- 2025–: Győri ETO-UNI FKC
National team
| Years | Team | Apps | (Gls) |
| 2014– | Hungary | 8 | (6) |

Balázs Szöllősi (born 24 October 1992) is a Hungarian handballer who plays for Balatonfüredi KSE and the Hungarian national team.
