= Stevan Sretenović =

Serbian handball player (born 1995)

Personal information
- Nationality: Serbian
- Born: 25 September 1995 (age 31) Aranđelovac, Serbia, FR Yugoslavia
- Height: 2.01 m (6 ft 7 in)

Sport
- Sport: Handball
- Position: Left back
- Current club: Balatonfüredi KSE
- Number: 5

Youth career
- Years: Team
- –: Šamot
- –: Rukobel

Senior clubs
- Years: Team
- 2013–2016: RK Partizan
- 2016–2017: USAM Nîmes Gard
- 2017–2019: RK Železničar 1949
- 2019–2020: RK Vojvodina
- 2020–2021: CSM Bacău
- 2021–2022: HC Meshkov Brest
- 2022–: Balatonfüredi KSE
National team
| Years | Team | Apps | (Gls) |
| 2014– | Serbia | 31 | (77) |

Stevan Sretenović (Serbian Cyrillic: Стеван Сретеновић; born 25 September 1995) is a Serbian handball player for Balatonfüredi KSE and the Serbian national team.

== Career ==
After playing for Partizan, Sretenović moved abroad to France and signed with USAM Nîmes Gard in August 2016.

A Serbia international since 2014, Sretenović participated in the 2020 European Men's Handball Championship.

He represented Serbia at the 2020 European Men's Handball Championship.
