= Bendegúz Bóka =

Hungarian handball player (born 1993)

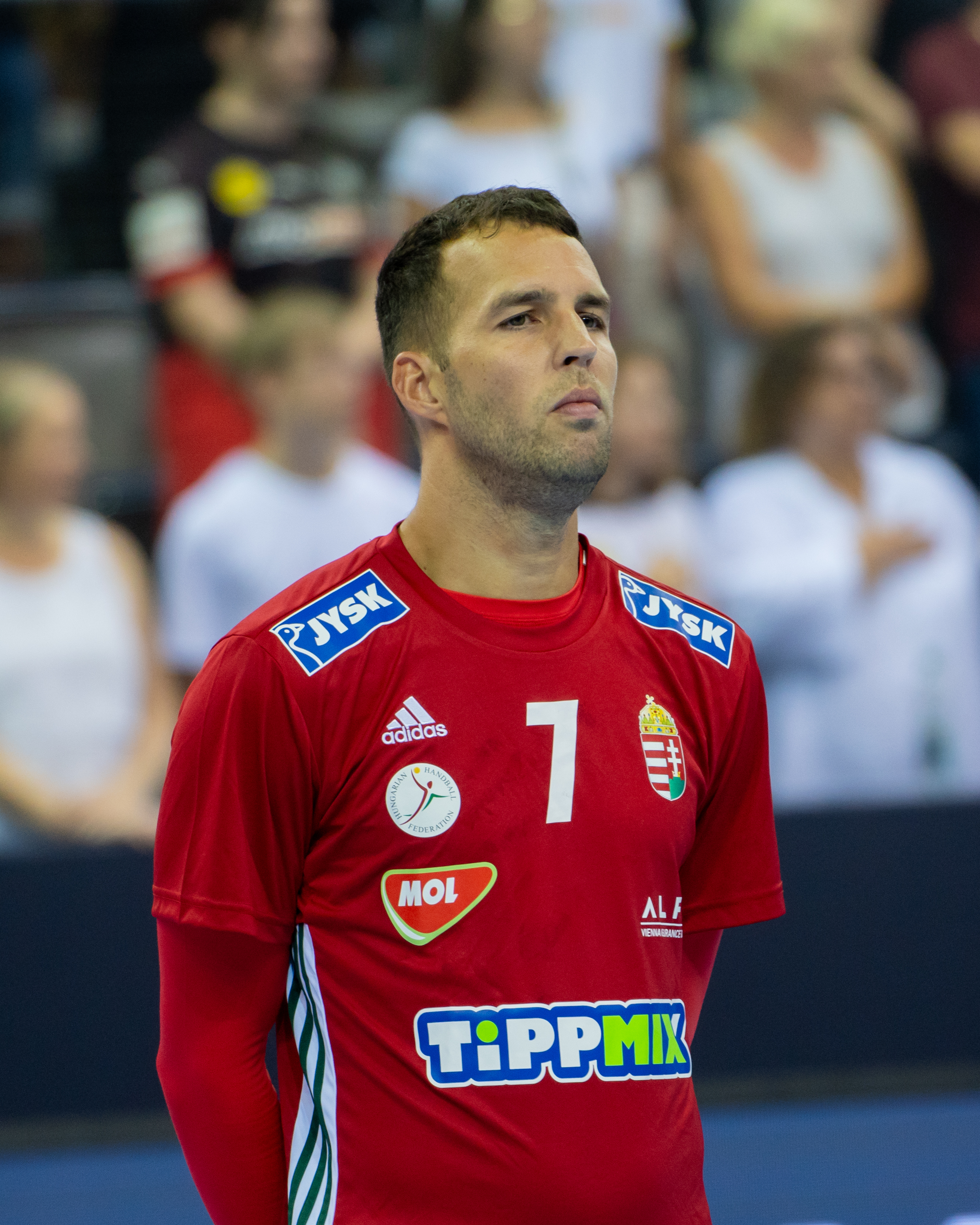

Personal information
- Nationality: Hungarian
- Born: 2 October 1993 (age 33) Veszprém, Hungary
- Height: 1.95 m (6 ft 5 in)

Sport
- Sport: Handball
- Position: Left wing
- Current club: Balatonfüred
- Number: 7

Senior clubs
- Years: Team
- 2011–2016: Balatonfüred
- 2016–2017: SC Pick Szeged
- 2017–: Balatonfüred
National team
| Years | Team | Apps | (Gls) |
| 2014– | Hungary | 113 | (269) |

Bendegúz Bóka (born 2 October 1993) is a Hungarian handballer for Balatonfüredi KSE and the Hungarian national team.

He represented Hungary at the 2019 World Men's Handball Championship.
