= Bence Zdolik =

Hungarian handball player (born 1992)

Personal information
- Nationality: Hungarian
- Born: 16 May 1992 (age 34) Békéscsaba, Hungary
- Height: 1.98 m (6 ft 6 in)

Sport
- Sport: Handball
- Position: Left back
- Current club: Grundfos Tatabánya KC
- Number: 29
National team
Years	Team	Apps	(Gls)
2013-	Hungary	13	(15)

Bence Zdolik (born 16 May 1992) is a Hungarian handball player for Grundfos Tatabánya KC and the Hungarian national team.

== Honours ==
=== Individual ===
- Hungarian Junior Handballer of the Year: 2012, 2013
