= Veszprém Aréna =

Arena in Veszprém, Hungary

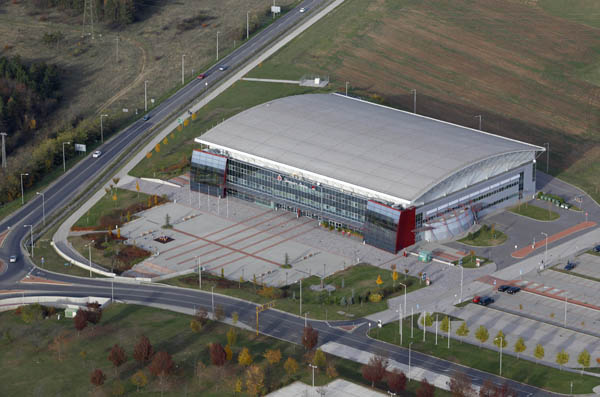
- Interactive map of Veszprém Aréna
- Location: Veszprém, Hungary
- Coordinates: 47.1043024°N 17.9326057°E
- Owner: Veszprémi Közüzemi Szolgáltató Zrt.
- Operator: Veszprémi Csarnoküzemeltető, Rendezvényszervező és Kommunikációs Kft.
- Capacity: 5,096 (handball); 6,000 (concerts)
- Field size: 46 x 38 m

Construction
- Groundbreaking: June 2007
- Opened: July 2008
- Cost: HUF 4.7 billion EUR € 15,8 million
- General contractor: Multicsarnok Kft.

Tenants
- One Veszprém, Alba Fehérvár (EuroCup)

Website
- Official website

Veszprém Aréna is an indoor sports and events hall in Veszprém, Hungary. It is the home ground of the top-class handball club Veszprém KC, that regularly host the best teams of Europe.

The city has a first division women's handball club as well, which played in the Veszprém Aréna until 2011; but thanks to its field dimensions, the arena is able to host any sort of sporting or cultural events, such as basketball or volleyball matches, martial arts shows, concerts, exhibitions and conferences. It also has a separated lounge, that is capable alone to organize smaller events, be it a party night or a wedding.

== History ==
The constructions of the Veszprém Aréna began in June 2007, based on the adapted plans of Zlatorog Arena. The investment was coordinated by Multicsarnok Kft., that was established only for this purpose. It took about a year to build the sports hall completely and it was inaugurated with a three-day-long festival starting on 18 July 2008. The official opening ceremony took place on 20 July 2008, with the participation of Pál Schmitt, president of the Hungarian Olympic Committee, Veszprém-born Olympic champion hammer thrower Balázs Kiss and János Debreczenyi, Mayor of Veszprém.

== Location and accessibility ==
The arena is located in the North Eastern part of Veszprém, just 500 metres away from the roundabout by Külső-Kádártai út, near the main road 82, heading to Győr. Bus line five and thirteen stops 300 metres from the hall at the Kádártai utca terminal, from where the arena is easily and safely approachable through the pedestrian subway. South to the arena is situated a car park, with 750 parking spaces and 16 addition places for buses. Next to that lies a heliport, which is also suitable for rescue helicopters. The entire area of the hall is accessible for the disabled.

== Events ==
- 2008 EHF Men's Champions Trophy final tournament
- 2008–09 EHF Women's Champions League final
- Pannon Kupa, international handball tournament
- WAKO Hungarian Martial Arts Championship
- X-Factor show
- Horse Evolution show
- Harlem Globetrotters show
- Michael Flatley's Lord of the Dance show
- Tiësto concert
- West Side Story musical
- 2012–13 EHF Women's Champions League semifinal
- 2015–16 Women's EHF Cup final
- Toto (band) concert
- Joe Bonamassa concert

== See also ==
- List of indoor arenas in Hungary
