= 2023–24 Nemzeti Bajnokság I (men's handball) =

Season of a handball league In Hungary

Nemzeti Bajnokság I
- Season: 2023–24
- Dates: 26 August 2023 – 29 May 2024
- Champion: Telekom Veszprém; 28th title
- Relegated: Veszprémi KKFT
- Champions League: Telekom Veszprém; OTP Bank-Pick Szeged
- European League: MOL-Tatabánya KC; FTC-Green Collect
- Matches played: 184
- Goals scored: 10,947 (59.49 per match)
- Top goalscorer: Bence Nagy

The 2023–24 Nemzeti Bajnokság I (known as the K&H férfi kézilabda liga for sponsorship reasons) was the 73rd season of the Nemzeti Bajnokság I, the top men's handball league in Hungary. A total of fourteen teams contest this season's league, which began on 26 August 2023 and will conclude in 29 May 2024.

Telekom Veszprém won their twenty-eighth title.

== Teams ==
=== Team changes ===
Promoted from 2022–23 Nemzeti Bajnokság I/B	Relegated from 2023–24 Nemzeti Bajnokság I
QHB-Eger; PLER-Budapest	HÉP-Cegléd; Budai Farkasok-Rév

=== Arenas and locations ===
Location of teams in 2023–24 Nemzeti Bajnokság I

The following 14 clubs compete in the Nemzeti Bajnokság I during the 2023–24 season:

Team	Location	Arena	Capacity
Balatonfüredi KSE	Balatonfüred	Szabadidőközpont	712
Budakalász FKC	Budakalász	Városi Sportcsarnok	400
Csurgói KK	Csurgó	Sótonyi László Sportcsarnok	1,200
Dabas KK	Dabas	OBO Aréna	1,920
Eger-Eszterházy SzSE	Eger	Kemény Ferenc Sportcsarnok	885
Ferencvárosi TC	Budapest (Ferencváros)	Elek Gyula Aréna	1,300
Gyöngyösi KK	Gyöngyös	Dr. Fejes András Sportcsarnok	1,100
Komlói BSK	Komló	Sportközpont	800
NEKA	Balatonboglár	NEKA Csarnok	678
PLER-Budapest	Budapest (Pestszentlőrinc)	BUD Aréna	1,000
SC Pick Szeged	Szeged	Pick Aréna	8,143
Tatabánya KC	Tatabánya	Tatabányai Multifunkcionális Sportcsarnok	6,200
Veszprém KC	Veszprém	Veszprém Aréna	5,096
Veszprém KKFT	Veszprém	Március 15. úti Sportcsarnok	2,200

==== Number of teams by counties and regions ====
Number of teams by counties
Pos.	County (megye)	No. of teams	Teams
1	Veszprém	3	Balatonfüredi KSE, Veszprém KC and Veszprém KKFT
2	Budapest	2	Ferencvárosi TC and PLER
2	Heves	2	Eger-Eszterházy SzSE and Gyöngyösi KK
2	Pest	2	Budakalász FKC and Dabas KK
2	Somogy	2	Csurgói KK and NEKA
6	Baranya	1	Komlói BSK
6	Csongrád-Csanád	1	SC Pick Szeged
6	Komárom-Esztergom	1	Tatabánya KC

Number of teams by regions
Transdanubia	Central Hungary	Great Plain and North
Balatonfüred; Csurgói KK; Komlói BSK; NEKA; Tatabánya KC; Veszprém KC; Veszprém KKFT	Budakalász FKC; Dabas KK; Ferencvárosi TC; PLER-Budapest	Eger-Eszterházy SzSE; Gyöngyösi KK; SC Pick Szeged
7 Teams	4 Teams	3 Teams

== Regular season ==
=== League table ===
Pos	Team	Pld	W	D	L	GF	GA	GD	Pts	Qualification or relegation
1	Telekom Veszprém	26	26	0	0	1063	711	+352	52	Qualification to the Finals and advance for Champions League
2	OTP Bank-Pick Szeged	26	23	0	3	960	760	+200	46	Qualification to the Finals and advance for Champions League
3	MOL Tatabánya KC	26	16	3	7	804	745	+59	35	Qualification for European League group stage
4	FTC-Green Collect	26	14	4	8	830	789	+41	32	Qualification for European League qualifying round
5	Csurgói KK	26	12	3	11	730	750	−20	27 (Note: Head-to-head points: Csurgó 3, Gyöngyös 1.)	
6	HE-DO B. Braun Gyöngyös	26	12	3	11	773	792	−19	27	
7	CYEB-Budakalász	26	11	3	12	742	768	−26	25	
8	Balatonfüredi KSE	26	11	1	14	686	727	−41	23 (Note: Head-to-head points: Balatonfüred 4, Dabas 0.)	
9	Dabasi KC	26	11	1	14	736	776	−40	23	
10	QHB-Eger	26	8	2	16	675	799	−124	18 (Note: Head-to-head points: Eger 4, PLER 0.)	
11	PLER-Budapest	26	8	2	16	714	791	−77	18	
12	Carbonex-Komló	26	8	1	17	691	765	−74	17 (Note: Head-to-head points: Komló 2, NEKA 2.)	
13	HSA NEKA	26	7	3	16	700	776	−76	17	Relegation to Nemzeti Bajnokság I/B
14	Fejér B.Á.L. Veszprém (R)	26	2	0	24	716	871	−155	4	Relegation to Nemzeti Bajnokság I/B

Source: Hungarian Handball Federation (in Hungarian), Flashscore
Rules for classification: 1) Points; 2) Head-to-head points; 3) Goal difference; 4) Head-to-head goal difference; 5) Goals scored; 6) Matches won; 7) Draw (Note: Head-to-head record is used only after all the matches between the teams in question have been played)
(R) Relegated

== Finals ==
Team 1	Series	Team 2	Game 1	Game 2	Game 3
Telekom Veszprém	2–0	OTP Bank-Pick Szeged	35–28	34–30	—

=== Game 1 ===
25 May 2024; 20:00	Telekom Veszprém	35–28	OTP Bank-Pick Szeged	Veszprém Aréna, Veszprém; Attendance: 4,100; Referees: Hargitai, Markó
25 May 2024; 20:00	Yahia 8	(19–13)	Martins, Garciandia 4	Veszprém Aréna, Veszprém; Attendance: 4,100; Referees: Hargitai, Markó
25 May 2024; 20:00	1× (yellow card) 2× (suspension)	Report	4× (suspension)	Veszprém Aréna, Veszprém; Attendance: 4,100; Referees: Hargitai, Markó

=== Game 2 ===
29 May 2025; 18:00	OTP Bank-Pick Szeged	30–34	Telekom Veszprém	Pick Aréna, Szeged; Attendance: 5,263; Referees: Bócz, Wiedemann
29 May 2025; 18:00	four players 4	(13–16)	three players 5	Pick Aréna, Szeged; Attendance: 5,263; Referees: Bócz, Wiedemann
29 May 2025; 18:00	1× (yellow card) 6× (suspension)	Report	6× (suspension)	Pick Aréna, Szeged; Attendance: 5,263; Referees: Bócz, Wiedemann

Telekom Veszprém won the Finals, 2–0 on series.

2023–24 Nemzeti Bajnokság I
Champion
Telekom Veszprém
28th title

== See also ==
- 2023–24 Magyar Kupa
- 2023–24 Nemzeti Bajnokság I/B
- 2023–24 Nemzeti Bajnokság II
