= 2021–22 Nemzeti Bajnokság I/B (men's handball) =

Nemzeti Bajnokság I/B
- Season: 2021–22
- Dates: 10 September 2021 – 19 June 2022
- Champions: Budai Farkasok KKUK
- Promoted: Budai Farkasok KKUK; HÉP-Cegléd
- Matches: 1

The 2020–21 Nemzeti Bajnokság I/B was the 54th season of the Nemzeti Bajnokság I/B, the second tier handball league in Hungary. This season the competition is being contested by 20 clubs split geographically across two groups of 10 teams, which began on 10 September 2021 and concluded on 19 June 2022.

== Teams ==
=== Team changes ===
Promoted from 2020–21 Nemzeti Bajnokság II	Relegated from 2020–21 Nemzeti Bajnokság I	Promoted to 2022–23 Nemzeti Bajnokság I	Relegated to 2022–23 Nemzeti Bajnokság II
Komárom VSE; Csépe Salgótarjáni SKC; Százhalombattai KE	Ceglédi KKSE; Orosházi FKSE - Linamar	Budai Farkasok-Rév Group; HÉP-Cegléd	Mezőkövesdi KC; FTC-Diagnosticum (U21); Komárom VSE; Pécsi VSE

=== Western Group ===
Location of Western Group teams in 2021–22 Nemzeti Bajnokság I/B

Team	Location	Arena	2020–21
BFKA-Balatonfüred	Balatonfüred	Eötvös Sportcsarnok	6th
Budai Farkasok KKUK	Budaörs	Városi Uszoda és Sportcsarnok	5th
ETO-SZESE Győr FKC	Győr	Magvassy Mihály Sportcsarnok	8th
Komárom VSE	Komárom	Városi Sportcsarnok	1st (NB II - Northwest)
Pécsi VSE	Pécs	Sportközpont (Komló)	7th
PLER-Budapest	Budapest, XVIII. ker	Sportkastély	4th
Százhalombattai KE	Százhalombatta	Városi Szabadidő Központ	1st (NB II - South)
Szigetszentmiklósi KSK	Szigetszentmiklós	Kézilabda Csarnok	9th
Tatai AC	Tata	Güntner Aréna	3rd
BFKA-Veszprém	Veszprém	DEVM Sportcsarnok	2nd

=== Eastern Group ===
Location of Eastern Group teams in 2021–22 Nemzeti Bajnokság I/B

Team	Location	Arena	2020–21
Békési FKC	Békés	Városi Sportcsarnok	7th
Ceglédi KKSE	Cegléd	Gál József Sportcsarnok	13th (NB I)
DEAC	Debrecen	DEAC Sportcsarnok	8th
Ferencvárosi TC (U21)	Budapest, IX. ker	Elek Gyula Aréna	3rd
Mezőkövesdi KC	Mezőkövesd	Városi Sportcsarnok	4th
Orosházi FKSE	Orosháza	Városi Sportcsarnok	14th (NB I)
Ózdi KC	Ózd	Marosi István Sportcsarnok	6th
Salgótarjáni SKC	Salgótarján	Városi Sportcsarnok	1st (NB II - North)
SC Pick Szeged (U21)	Szeged	Városi Sportcsarnok	2nd
Vecsés SE	Vecsés	Városi Sportcsarnok (Üllő)	9th

== Regular season ==
=== Western Group ===
==== Standings ====
Pos	Team	Pld	W	D	L	GF	GA	GD	Pts	Qualification or relegation
1	Budai Farkasok-Rév Group	18	14	1	3	530	459	+71	29	Qualification for the Promotion round
2	BFKA-Veszprém	18	12	3	3	553	492	+61	27	Qualification for the Promotion round
3	PLER-Budapest	18	12	2	4	567	465	+102	26	Qualification for the Promotion round
4	Tatai AC	18	10	1	7	494	467	+27	21	Qualification for the Promotion round
5	Szigetszentmiklósi KSK	18	9	1	8	497	501	−4	19 (Note: Head-to-head points: Szigetszentmiklósi KSK 3, BFKA-Balatonfüred 1.)	Qualification for the Promotion round
6	BFKA-Balatonfüred	18	8	3	7	486	509	−23	19	Qualification for the Relegation round
7	Agrofeed ETO UNI Győr	18	8	0	10	490	496	−6	16	Qualification for the Relegation round
8	Százhalombattai KE	18	7	1	10	523	551	−28	15	Qualification for the Relegation round
9	Komárom VSE	18	2	2	14	445	527	−82	6	Qualification for the Relegation round
10	Pécsi VSE	18	1	0	17	444	562	−118	2	Qualification for the Relegation round

Updated to match(es) played on 16 March 2022. Source: mksz.hu
Rules for classification: 1) Points; 2) Head-to-head points; 3) Goal difference; 4) Head-to-head goal difference; 5) Goals scored; 6) Matches won; 7) Draw (Note: Head-to-head record is used only after all the matches between the teams in question have been played)

==== Schedule and results ====
In the table below the home teams are listed on the left and the away teams along the top.

Home \ Away	BFKB	BFAR	GYŐR	KOM	PÉCS	PLER	SZÁZ	SZIG	TAC	BFKV
BFKA-Balatonfüred	—	23–22	32–25	27–25	33–27	28–25	30–32	23–28	23–30	27–37
Budai Farkasok KKUK	30–20	—	32–22	37–30	33–24	24–29	37–29	30–24	31–27	28–28
ETO-SZESE Győr	29–24	21–26	—	33–28	34–24	25–26	26–21	26–33	24–35	27–28
Komárom VSE	26–28	16–22	19–25	—	25–30	15–36	23–24	26–35	30–27	31–31
Pécsi VSE	32–33	24–31	23–32	22–27	—	24–37	28–37	20–25	24–25	21–24
PLER-Budapest	29–29	21–26	37–28	29–29	40–23	—	35–33	36–22	31–32	30–21
Százhalombattai KE	29–31	34–35	28–25	32–26	37–24	26–36	—	28–29	22–22	27–38
Szigetszentmiklósi KSK	22–22	29–31	26–31	27–26	27–26	28–38	34–35	—	35–25	26–23
Tatai AC	31–23	24–26	25–31	23–18	30–24	22–23	31–20	28–21	—	30–27
BFKA-Veszprém	30–30	34–29	29–26	39–25	32–24	30–29	41–29	27–26	34–27	—

Updated to match(es) played on 16 March 2022. Source: Results
Legend: Blue = home team win; Yellow = draw; Red = away team win.
For upcoming matches, an "a" indicates there is an article about the rivalry between the two participants.

=== Eastern Group ===
==== Standings ====
Pos	Team	Pld	W	D	L	GF	GA	GD	Pts	Qualification or relegation
1	Orosházi FKSE-Tokai	18	12	2	4	499	480	+19	26	Qualification for the Promotion round
2	Csépe Salgótarjáni SKC	18	11	1	6	491	478	+13	23	Qualification for the Promotion round
3	HÉP-Cegléd	18	9	2	7	460	403	+57	20	Qualification for the Promotion round
4	Optimum Solar-Békési FKC	18	9	1	8	516	495	+21	19 (Note: Head-to-head points: Optimum Solar-Békési FKC 4, ÓAM-Ózdi KC 0.)	Qualification for the Promotion round
5	ÓAM-Ózdi KC	18	7	5	6	440	441	−1	19	Qualification for the Promotion round
6	Pick Szeged (U21)	18	8	2	8	484	477	+7	18	Qualification for the Relegation round
7	Vecsés SE	18	7	1	10	511	533	−22	15	Qualification for the Relegation round
8	DEAC	18	6	2	10	462	484	−22	14 (Note: Head-to-head points: DEAC 4, Mezőkövesdi KC 0.)	Qualification for the Relegation round
9	Mezőkövesdi KC	18	6	2	10	486	494	−8	14	Qualification for the Relegation round
10	FTC-Diagnosticum (U21)	18	6	0	12	478	542	−64	12	Qualification for the Relegation round

Updated to match(es) played on 16 March 2022. Source: mksz.hu
Rules for classification: 1) Points; 2) Head-to-head points; 3) Goal difference; 4) Head-to-head goal difference; 5) Goals scored; 6) Matches won; 7) Draw (Note: Head-to-head record is used only after all the matches between the teams in question have been played)

==== Schedule and results ====
In the table below the home teams are listed on the left and the away teams along the top.

Home \ Away	BFKC	CEG	DEAC	FTC	MKC	ORO	ÓZD	SAL	SZEG	VECS
Békési FKC	—	27–20	34–25	34–26	32–22	28–30	30–26	24–25	33–33	33–29
Ceglédi KKSE	30–16	—	21–22	30–27	27–29	25–26	34–19	33–17	30–20	36–29
DEAC	22–25	25–32	—	33–30	28–24	24–24	17–23	26–23	29–27	28–30
Ferencvárosi TC (U21)	35–32	20–24	28–27	—	28–27	24–26	29–28	25–31	33–28	31–28
Mezőkövesdi KC	27–24	21–21	19–21	36–25	—	26–30	22–22	32–28	34–30	32–26
Orosházi FKSE	27–24	23–29	28–24	37–28	32–31	—	23–18	26–31	28–24	31–28
Ózdi KC	24–29	23–23	26–26	27–16	26–25	24–24	—	32–26	22–19	28–27
Salgótarjáni SKC	29–30	24–21	23–22	32–26	35–32	34–29	23–22	—	26–26	28–23
SC Pick Szeged (U21)	33–31	10–0 (Note: The SC Pick Szeged (U21) v Ceglédi KKSE match was awarded as a 10–0 win to Szeged.)	28–27	31–23	31–22	26–29	24–26	27–26	—	33–28
Vecsés SE	32–30	25–24	39–36	31–24	28–25	32–26	24–24	22–30	30–34	—

Updated to match(es) played on 16 March 2022. Source: Results
Legend: Blue = home team win; Yellow = draw; Red = away team win.
For upcoming matches, an "a" indicates there is an article about the rivalry between the two participants.

== Play-offs ==
=== Promotion round ===
The top five teams advanced from the Western- and Eastern Group of the regular season.

==== Standings ====
Pos	Team	Pld	W	D	L	GF	GA	GD	Pts	Qualification
1	Budai Farkasok-Rév Group (C, P)	18	12	3	3	521	470	+51	27	Promotion to the Nemzeti Bajnokság I
2	HÉP-Cegléd (P)	18	11	2	5	504	412	+92	24	Promotion to the Nemzeti Bajnokság I
3	PLER-Budapest	18	12	0	6	526	488	+38	24	
4	Tatai AC	18	9	2	7	508	497	+11	20	
5	Orosházi FKSE-Tokai	18	9	2	7	523	535	−12	20	
6	BFKA-Veszprém	18	9	1	8	526	506	+20	19	
7	Optimum Solar-Békési FKC	18	7	2	9	507	511	−4	16	
8	Csépe Salgótarjáni SKC	18	7	0	11	490	534	−44	14	
9	Szigetszentmiklósi KSK	18	5	0	13	520	579	−59	10	
10	ÓAM-Ózdi KC	18	2	2	14	432	525	−93	6	

Updated to match(es) played on 17 May 2022. Source: mksz.hu
Rules for classification: 1) Points; 2) Goal difference; 3) Head-to-head points; 4) Head-to-head goal difference; 5) Goals scored; 6) Matches won; 7) Draw (Note: Head-to-head record is used only after all the matches between the teams in question have been played)
(C) Champions; (P) Promoted

==== Schedule and results ====
In the table below the home teams are listed on the left and the away teams along the top.

Home \ Away	BFKC	BFAR	CEG	PLER	ORO	ÓZD	SAL	SZIG	TAC	BFKV
Békési FKC	—	27–28	—	29–31	—	—	—	36–33	30–30	31–27
Budai Farkasok KKUK	28–25	—	20–20	—	39–29	41–26	36–30	—	—	—
Ceglédi KKSE	—	28–21	—	31–19	—	—	—	37–20	28–22	30–27
PLER-Budapest	27–23	—	25–32	—	34–32	31–24	34–25	—	—	—
Orosházi FKSE	—	23–23	—	32–27	—	—	—	30–28	39–33	35–34
Ózdi KC	—	22–27	—	28–30	—	—	—	33–31	21–32	23–26
Salgótarjáni SKC	—	24–33	—	27–31	—	—	—	36–33	26–29	32–29
Szigetszentmiklósi KSK	28–40	—	31–38	—	41–33	32–27	32–31	—	—	—
Tatai AC	33–33	—	24–22	—	30–25	31–18	29–27	—	—	—
BFKA-Veszprém	35–25	—	28–23	—	33–37	32–22	31–23	—	—	—

Updated to match(es) played on 25 June 2022. Source: Results
Legend: Blue = home team win; Yellow = draw; Red = away team win.
For upcoming matches, an "a" indicates there is an article about the rivalry between the two participants.

=== Relegation round ===
The bottom five teams advanced from the Western- and Eastern Group of the regular season.

==== Standings ====
Pos	Team	Pld	W	D	L	GF	GA	GD	Pts	Qualification or relegation
11	Százhalombattai KE	18	13	0	5	565	515	+50	26	
12	BFKA-Balatonfüred	18	12	1	5	538	520	+18	25	
13	Agrofeed ETO UNI Győr	18	12	0	6	544	504	+40	24	
14	Pick Szeged (U21)	18	11	0	7	530	479	+51	22	
15	Vecsés SE	18	10	1	7	561	544	+17	21	
16	DEAC	18	9	1	8	540	511	+29	19	
17	Mezőkövesdi KC (R)	18	9	1	8	562	535	+27	19	Relegation to Nemzeti Bajnokság II
18	FTC-Diagnosticum (U21) (R)	18	6	1	11	529	570	−41	13	Relegation to Nemzeti Bajnokság II
19	Komárom VSE (R)	18	2	3	13	467	554	−87	7	Relegation to Nemzeti Bajnokság II
20	Pécsi VSE (R)	18	2	0	16	489	593	−104	4	Relegation to Nemzeti Bajnokság II

Updated to match(es) played on 3 June 2022. Source: mksz.hu
Rules for classification: 1) Points; 2) Goal difference; 3) Head-to-head points; 4) Head-to-head goal difference; 5) Goals scored; 6) Matches won; 7) Draw (Note: Head-to-head record is used only after all the matches between the teams in question have been played)
(R) Relegated

==== Schedule and results ====
In the table below the home teams are listed on the left and the away teams along the top.

Home \ Away	BFKB	DEAC	GYŐR	FTC	KOM	MKC	PÉCS	SZÁZ	SZEG	VECS
BFKA-Balatonfüred	—	31–30	—	34–30	—	30–29	—	—	31–26	29–24
DEAC	25–24	—	35–29	—	39–24	—	39–26	28–34	—	—
ETO-SZESE Győr	—	32–27	—	34–32	—	38–33	—	—	30–21	37–31
Ferencvárosi TC (U21)	30–31	—	36–35	—	24–28	—	29–32	30–32	—	—
Komárom VSE	—	28–28	—	34–34	—	29–35	—	—	22–33	28–28
Mezőkövesdi KC	34–34	—	36–27	—	42–30	—	41–38	33–32	—	—
Pécsi VSE	—	24–30	—	31–34	—	24–29	—	—	18–29	37–39
Százhalombattai KE	—	34–30	—	38–28	—	36–31	—	—	32–31	28–25
SC Pick Szeged (U21)	33–24	—	26–28	—	32–22	—	29–19	28–27	—	—
Vecsés SE	34–32	—	28–25	—	38–23	—	36–30	38–32	—	—

Updated to match(es) played on 3 June 2022. Source: Results
Legend: Blue = home team win; Yellow = draw; Red = away team win.
For upcoming matches, an "a" indicates there is an article about the rivalry between the two participants.

== See also ==
- 2021–22 Magyar Kupa
- 2021–22 Nemzeti Bajnokság I
- 2021–22 Nemzeti Bajnokság II
