= Szigetszentmiklósi KSK =

Hungarian handball club

- Full name: Szigetszentmiklósi Kézilabda Sport Kör
- Short name: SZKSK
- Founded: 1992; 34 years ago
- Arena: SZKSK Kézilabda Csarnok, Szigetszentmiklós
- Capacity: 420
- Head coach: Bálint Kilvinger
- League: Nemzeti Bajnokság I
- Club colours
Home	Away

Szigetszentmiklósi KSK is a Hungarian handball club from Szigetszentmiklós, that currently plays in the Nemzeti Bajnokság I.

Location of Szigetszentmiklósi KSK

== History ==
The sports club of Csepel Autógyár used to have women's and men's divisions, but these divisions were discontinued in 1990. However, due to the growing youth and several new players, it became necessary to establish a Szigetszentmiklós association. The Szigetszentmiklósi KSK was founded in 1992. The adult team was promoted to the Nemzeti Bajnokság II within two years. In the 2010/11 season, the team won the NBII Western Group and was able to play in the second tier of the league (Nemzeti Bajnokság I/B) with its home-grown players. The team was relegated after 1 year and next played in Nemzeti Bajnokság I/B after the 2014/2015 season. A renowned head coach was signed before the 2024/2025 season, in the person of Vilmos Imre. The team won Nemzeti Bajnokság I/B at the end of the season and was able to compete in the top division, Nemzeti Bajnokság I, for the first time in its history.

== Crest, colours, supporters ==
=== Kits ===
HOME
2016–18	2018–21	2021–23	2023–24

AWAY
2016–18	2018–19	2019–21	2021–22	2023–24

THIRD
2021–22	2023–24

== Team ==
=== Current squad ===
Squad for the 2026–27 season

Szigetszentmiklósi KSK

Goalkeepers

- 12 (Hungary) Balázs Holló
- 20 (Hungary) Xavér Deményi

Left Wingers

- 23 (Hungary) László Spacsek
- 29 (Hungary) Balázs Hoffmann

Right Wingers

- 6 (Hungary) Martin Varjú
- 19 (Hungary) Máté Lakosy

Line Players

- 5 (Hungary) Dávid Debreczeni
- 9 (Hungary) Márk Kovács
- 54 (Hungary) Botond Balogh

Central Backs

- 2 (Hungary) Milán Váczi
- 10 (Hungary) Péter Schmid
- 18 (Hungary) Mihály Varga
- 34 (Bosnia and Herzegovina) Marko Davidović

Left Backs

- 38 (Hungary) Tamás Tóvizi

Right Backs

- 21 (Hungary) Sándor Oláh
- 44 (Hungary) Zsolt Schäffer

=== Technical staff ===
- Head Coach: (Hungary) Bálint Kilvinger
- Goalkeeping Coach: (Hungary) Mátyás Kovácsovics
- Coach: (Hungary) János Vas
- Masseur: (Hungary) Sándor Mallinger

=== Transfers ===
Transfers for the 2026–27 season

Joining

- (Hungary) Dávid Debreczeni (LP) from (Hungary) Ferencvárosi TC
- (Hungary) Zsolt Schäffer (RB) from (Hungary) HE-DO B. Braun Gyöngyös
- (Hungary) Martin Varjú (RW) from (Hungary) Budakalász FKC
- (Hungary) Mihály Varga (CB) from (Hungary) Budakalász FKC
- (Hungary) Milán Váczi (CB) from (Hungary) Carbonex-Komló
- (Hungary) Xavér Deményi (GK) from (Hungary) Balatonfüredi KSE
- (Hungary) Botond Balogh (LP) from (Hungary) ONE Veszprém U21
- (Hungary) Sándor Oláh (RB) from (Hungary) Ferencvárosi TC U21

Leaving

- (Netherlands) Destin van Dijk (LB) to (Belgium) Sporting Pelt
- (Slovakia) Martin Mazak (LP) to (Hungary) Vecsés SE
- (Hungary) Balázs Brandt (RW) to (Hungary) Ceglédi KKSE
- (Hungary) Máté Gábori (RW) to (Hungary) Üllői KSE
- (Croatia) Bruno Butorac (RB)
- (Croatia) Mario Cvitković (GK)
- (Serbia) Milos Mojsilov (GK)
- (Hungary) Félix Turák (LP)
- (Hungary) Bence Márton (RB)
- (Hungary) Martin Perényi (GK)

=== Transfer History ===
Transfers for the 2025–26 season

Joining

- (Bosnia and Herzegovina) Marko Davidović (CB) from (Romania) Steaua București
- (Netherlands) Destin van Dijk (LB) from (Netherlands) Bevo HC
- (Croatia) Bruno Butorac (RB) from (France) US Créteil Handball
- (Serbia) Milos Mojsilov (GK) from (Romania) CSM Bacău
- (Hungary) Máté Lakosy (RW) from (Hungary) HE-DO B. Braun Gyöngyös
- (Hungary) Balázs Holló (GK) from (Hungary) Csurgói KK
- (Hungary) Tamás Tóvizi (LB) from (Hungary) QHB-Eger
- (Hungary) Balázs Hoffmann (LW) on loan from (Hungary) MOL Tatabánya KC
- (Hungary) Máté Klucsik (LP) on loan from (Hungary) Balatonfüredi KSE

Leaving

- (Germany) Ron Dieffenbacher (LP)
- (Hungary) Balázs Boros (RB) to (Hungary) Dabas KK
- (Hungary) Alex Németh (CB) to (Italy) Pallamano Romagna
- (Hungary) Szabolcs Nagy (LB) to (Hungary) Vecsés SE
- (Hungary) Norbert Parzer (RB) to (Hungary) Vecsés SE
- (Hungary) Gábor Éliás (CB) to (Hungary) Vecsés SE
- (Hungary) Roland Kovács (GK) to (Hungary) TFSE
- (Hungary) Márton Szabados (LW)
- (Hungary) Máté Klucsik (LP) loan back to (Hungary) Balatonfüredi KSE
- (Hungary) Gábor Pulay (RB) on loan at (Hungary) Ceglédi KKSE

Transfers for the 2024–25 season

Joining

- (Germany) Ron Dieffenbacher (LP) from (Germany) Füchse Berlin
- (Croatia) Mario Cvitković (GK) from (Slovakia) HT Tatran Prešov
- (Hungary) Márk Kovács (LP) from (Slovakia) HT Tatran Prešov
- (Hungary) Gábor Pulay (RB) from (Hungary) Fejér B.Á.L. Veszprém
- (Hungary) Péter Schmid (CB) from (Hungary) HE-DO B. Braun Gyöngyös
- (Hungary) Balázs Brandt (RW) from (Hungary) Balatonfüredi KSE
- (Hungary) Alex Németh (CB) from (Italy) Albatro Siracusa
- (Hungary) Martin Perényi (GK) from (Germany) HC Burgenland
- (Hungary) Márton Szabados (LW) from (Hungary) Győri ETO-UNI FKC
- (Hungary) Bence Szeverényi (CB) from (Hungary) Dabas KK
- (Hungary) Balázs Boros (RB) on loan from (Hungary) PLER-Budapest

Leaving

- (Hungary) Bence Szabó (LP) to (Hungary) Százhalombattai KE
- (Hungary) Gyula Kerkovits (LW) to (Hungary) Csömör KSK
- (Hungary) Bálint Jenei (RW) to (Hungary) Csömör KSK
- (Hungary) Richárd Bali (LB) (retires)
- (Hungary) Márton Tóth (CB)
- (Hungary) Bence Szeverényi (CB) to (Hungary) Kecskeméti TE
- (Hungary) Máté Borsos (GK) loan back to (Hungary) PLER-Budapest
- (Hungary) László Lovistyek (GK) loan back to (Hungary) Balatonfüredi KSE

Transfers for the 2023–24 season

Joining

- (Slovakia) Martin Mazak (LP) from (Hungary) Ceglédi KKSE
- (Hungary) Márton Tóth (CB) from (Hungary) Ceglédi KKSE
- (Hungary) Máté Gábori (RW) from (Hungary) HE-DO B. Braun Gyöngyös
- (Hungary) Simon Koszorus (CB) from (Hungary) Fejér B.Á.L. Veszprém
- (Hungary) Szabolcs Nagy (LB) from (Hungary) Budai Farkasok KKUK
- (Hungary) Gyula Kerkovits (LW) from (Hungary) Százhalombattai KE
- (Hungary) Norbert Parzer (RB) from (Hungary) PLER-Budapest
- (Hungary) Bálint Jenei (RW) from (Hungary) Salgótarjáni SKC
- (Hungary) Tamás Horváth (CB) from (Hungary) BFKA-Balatonfüred
- (Hungary) Félix Turák (LP) from (Hungary) Ferencvárosi TC
- (Hungary) Máté Borsos (GK) on loan from (Hungary) PLER-Budapest
- (Hungary) László Lovistyek (GK) on loan from (Hungary) Balatonfüredi KSE

Leaving

- (Hungary) Norbert Vitáris (GK) (retires)
- (Hungary) Martin Perényi (GK) to (Germany) HC Burgenland
- (Hungary) Milán Váczi (CB) to (Hungary) Sport36-Komló
- (Hungary) Szabolcs Szkokán (RW) to (Hungary) PLER-Budapest
- (Hungary) Dániel Hunyadi (LP) to (Hungary) Dabas KK
- (Hungary) Levente Skoda (LB) to (Hungary) Ózdi KC
- (Hungary) Dominik Bóka (RB) to (Hungary) Rákosmenti KSK
- (Hungary) Gergő Igali (LB) to (Hungary) Rákosmenti KSK
- (Hungary) Ádám Bécsi (CB) to (Hungary) Rákosmenti KSK
- (Hungary) Marcell Szamos (RW) to (Hungary) Rákosmenti KSK
- (Hungary) Márton Czabán (LB) to (Hungary) Vecsés SE
- (Hungary) Gábor Marcsek (LP) to (Hungary) Vecsés SE
- (Hungary) Zalán Takács (CB)
- (Hungary) Bence Mikita (CB) loan back to (Hungary) NEKA
- (Hungary) Márton Szabados (LW) loan back to (Hungary) Ferencvárosi TC

== Previous squads ==
2024–2025 Team
Shirt No	Nationality	Player	Birth Date	Position
2	Hungary	Félix Turák	29 December 2001 (age 24)	Line Player
7	Germany	Ron Dieffenbacher	16 December 2003 (age 22)	Line Player
8	Hungary	Máté Gábori	1 October 1987 (age 39)	Right Winger
9	Hungary	Márk Kovács	1 July 1997 (age 29)	Line Player
10	Hungary	Péter Schmid	16 August 1996 (age 30)	Central Back
12	Hungary	Roland Kovács	21 August 2000 (age 26)	Goalkeeper
14	Hungary	Gábor Éliás	20 December 1994 (age 31)	Central Back
16	Croatia	Mario Cvitković	9 August 1994 (age 32)	Goalkeeper
20	Hungary	Balázs Boros	2 August 1999 (age 27)	Right Back
22	Slovakia	Martin Mazak	14 April 1984 (age 42)	Line Player
23	Hungary	László Spacsek	21 August 2001 (age 25)	Left Winger
24	Hungary	Szabolcs Nagy	24 November 1995 (age 30)	Left Back
25	Hungary	Gábor Pulay	13 July 1993 (age 33)	Right Back
28	Hungary	Norbert Parzer	29 April 2002 (age 24)	Right Back
59	Hungary	Márton Szabados	9 December 2003 (age 22)	Left Winger
67	Hungary	Bence Márton	10 August 1999 (age 27)	Right Back
77	Hungary	Alex Németh	18 September 1998 (age 28)	Central Back
89	Hungary	Balázs Brandt	29 April 2000 (age 26)	Right Winger
99	Hungary	Martin Perényi	15 October 2003 (age 23)	Goalkeeper

== Season to season ==
As of 05/07/2025

- Seasons in Nemzeti Bajnokság I: 1
- Seasons in Nemzeti Bajnokság I/B: 11
- Seasons in Nemzeti Bajnokság II: 20

Season	Tier	Division	Place	Magyar Kupa
1992–93	4	MB I Pest	1st	
1993–94	3	NB II Északnyugat	9th	
1994–95	3	NB II Észak	7th	
1995–96	3	NB II Észak	9th	
1996–97	3	NB II Észak	11th	
1997–98	4	MB I Pest	1st	
1998–99	3	NB II Dél	7th	
1999–00	3	NB II Dél	4th	
2000–01	3	NB II Dél	8th	

Season	Tier	Division	Place	Magyar Kupa
2001–02	3	NB II Dél	7th	
2002–03	3	NB II Dél	7th	
2003–04	3	NB II Dél	7th	
2004–05	3	NB II Dél	8th	
2005–06	3	NB II Dél	9th	
2006–07	3	NB II Dél	7th	
2007–08	3	NB II Dél	5th	
2008–09	3	NB II Nyugat	7th	
2009–10	3	NB II Nyugat	6th	

Season	Tier	Division	Place	Magyar Kupa
2010–11	3	NB II Nyugat	1st	
2011–12	2	NB I/B Nyugat	13th	
2012–13	3	NB II Dél	5th	
2013–14	3	NB II Dél	8th	
2014–15	3	NB II Dél	1st	
2015–16	2	NB I/B Nyugat	13th	Round 2
2016–17	2	NB I/B Kelet	7th	Round 1
2017–18	2	NB I/B Nyugat	6th	Pre-qualifying
2018–19	2	NB I/B Nyugat	5th	Round 2
2019–20	1	NB I/B Nyugat	Cancelled due COVID-19	
2020–21	2	NB I/B Nyugat	9th	Round 1
2021–22	2	NB I/B	9th	Round 3
2022–23	2	NB I/B	9th	Round 4
2023–24	2	NB I/B	4th	Round 4
2024–25	2	NB I/B	1st	Round 4
2025–26	1	NB I		

== Former club members ==
=== Notable former players ===
- (Hungary) Péter Gúnya (2016)
- (Hungary) Péter Hajdú (2016)
- (Hungary) Ádám Iváncsik (2016-2019)
- (Hungary) Attila Kun (2015-2016)
- (Montenegro) Nikola Babovic (2016)
