= 2021–22 Magyar Kupa (men's handball) =

Hungarian men's handball season

Tournament details
- Country: Hungary
- Dates: 5 October 2021 – 24 April 2022
- Teams: 52

Final positions
- Champions: Telekom Veszprém; 29th title
- Runners-up: Fejér-B.Á.L. Veszprém
- Third place: Pick Szeged
- Fourth place: Schieszl-Budakalász FKC

Tournament statistics
- Matches played: 46 + 4 (Final four)

The 2021–22 Magyar Kupa, known as (Hungarian: TippMix férfi Magyar Kupa) for sponsorship reasons, was the 64th edition of the tournament.

Telekom Veszprém won their twenty-ninth title.

== Schedule ==
The rounds of the 2021–22 competition are scheduled as follows:

Round	Draw date and time	Official Matchday	Number of fixtures	Clubs	New entries this round
Pre-qualifying	22 July 2021, 14:00 CEST	22 September 2021			
Round I	27 September 2021, 11:00 CEST	20 October 2021	14	28 → 14	28
Round II	22 October 2021, 11:00 CEST	10 November 2021	8	16 → 8	2
Round III	16 November 2021, 11:00 CET	15 December 2021	8	16 → 8	8
Round IV	17 December 2021, 11:00 CET	9 February 2022	6	12 → 6	4
Round V	11 February 2022, 11:00 CET	23 March 2022	4	8 → 4	2
Final four	28 March 2022, 20:00 CEST	23–24 April 2022	4	4 → 1	none

== Teams ==
Tier	League	No	Teams
1	NB I	14	Balatonfüredi KSE, Budakalász FKC, Csurgói KK, Dabas KK, Eger-Eszterházy SzSE, Ferencvárosi TC, Gyöngyösi KK, Kecskeméti TE, Komlói BSK, NEKA, SC Pick Szeged, Tatabánya KC, Veszprém KC, Veszprém KKFT
2	NB I/B (West)	10	BFKA-Balatonfüred, Budai Farkasok KKUK, ETO-SZESE Győr FKC, Komárom VSE, Pécsi VSE, PLER-Budapest, Százhalombattai KE, Szigetszentmiklósi KSK, Tatai AC, BFKA-Veszprém
2	NB I/B (East)	8	Békési FKC, Ceglédi KKSE, DEAC, Mezőkövesdi KC, Orosházi FKSE, Ózdi KC, Salgótarjáni SKC, Vecsés SE
3	NB II (North-west)	1	KK Ajka
3	NB II (North)	3	Füzesabonyi SC, KISTEXT, Pénzügyőr SE
3	NB II (North-east)	3	Hajdúböszörményi TE, Kazincbarcikai KSE, Kisvárdai KC
3	NB II (South-west)	2	Dunaújvárosi AC, Kalocsai KC
3	NB II (South)	3	Csepel DSE, Mizse KC, VSK Tököl
3	NB II (South-east)	0	none

== Matches ==
A total of 44 matches took place, starting with Round I on 5 October 2021 and culminating with the Final on 24 April 2022.

=== First round ===
The first round ties was scheduled for 5–20 October 2021.

Team 1	Score	Team 2
5 October
VSK Tököl (II)	33–30	(I/B) Vecsés SE
6 October
Optimum Solar-Békési FKC (I/B)	35–26	(I/B) Orosházi FKSE-Tokai
DEAC (I/B)	30–22	(I/B) ÓAM-Ózdi KC
7 October
KK Ajka (II)	26–33	(I/B) Agrofeed ETO UNI Győr
Mizse KC (II)	30–31	(I/B) Szigetszentmiklósi KSK
8 October
Csepel DSE (II)	23–35	(I/B) PLER-Budapest
Fernstherm Future Füzesabony (II)	28–21	(II) Pénzügyőr SE
12 October
KISTEXT (II)	27–28	(I/B) Csépe Salgótarjáni SKC
13 October
Kalocsai KC (II)	29–29	(I/B) Százhalombattai KE
19 October
Dunaújvárosi AC (II)	31–34	(I/B) Pécsi VSE
Kazincbarcikai KSE (II)	22–39	(I/B) Mezőkövesdi KC
BFKA-Veszprém (I/B)	35–24	(I/B) Komárom VSE
20 October
BFKA-Balatonfüred (I/B)	21–27	(I/B) Tatai AC
Kisvárdai KC (II)	29–23	(II) Hajdúböszörményi TE

=== Second round ===
The second round ties was scheduled for 2–10 November 2021.

Team 1	Score	Team 2
2 November
VSK Tököl (II)	25–37	(I/B) Budai Farkasok-Rév Group
4 November
Kisvárdai KC (II)	19–35	(I/B) DEAC
Szigetszentmiklósi KSK (I/B)	38–29	(I/B) Tatai AC
5 November
PLER-Budapest (I/B)	36–27	(I/B) Optimum Solar-Békési FKC
Fernstherm Future Füzesabony (II)	18–31	(I/B) Ceglédi KKSE
Csépe Salgótarjáni SKC (I/B)	25–29	(I/B) Mezőkövesdi KC
10 November
Kalocsai KC (II)	24–34	(I/B) Pécsi VSE
BFKA-Veszprém (I/B)	35–32	(I/B) Agrofeed ETO UNI Győr

=== Third round ===
The third round ties was scheduled for 30 November – 15 December 2021.

Team 1	Score	Team 2
30 November
HE-DO B. Braun Gyöngyös (I)	31–29	(I) Dabas KC VSE
7 December
Kecskeméti TE-Piroska szörp (I)	31–31 (a)	(I) SBS-Eger
10 December
Ceglédi KKSE (I/B)	28–18	(I/B) Mezőkövesdi KC
14 December
NEKA (I)	24–25	(I) Budakalász FKC
15 December
Budai Farkasok-Rév Group (I/B)	27–30	(I) Fejér-B.Á.L. Veszprém
PLER-Budapest (I/B)	31–30	(I/B) DEAC
Pécsi VSE (I/B)	31–31 (a)	(I/B) BFKA-Veszprém
Szigetszentmiklósi KSK (I/B)	21–36	(I) Sport36-Komló

=== Fourth round ===
The fourth round ties were scheduled for 19 January – 9 February 2022.

Team 1	Score	Team 2
19 January
Ceglédi KKSE (I/B)	20–25	(I) SBS-Eger
28 January
PLER-Budapest (I/B)	30–38	(I) Budakalász FKC
31 January
BFKA-Veszprém (I/B)	29–41	(I) HE-DO B. Braun Gyöngyös
9 February
FTC (I)	29–24	(I) Balatonfüredi KSE
Csurgói KK (I)	30–31	(I) Fejér-B.Á.L. Veszprém
Sport36-Komló (I)	24–30	(I) Grundfos Tatabánya KC

=== Fifth round ===
The fifth round ties was scheduled for 9–23 March 2022.

Team 1	Score	Team 2
9 March
Budakalász FKC (I)	34–26	(I) SBS-Eger
22 March
Telekom Veszprém (I)	40–28	(I) FTC
23 March
Pick Szeged (I)	34–24	(I) HE-DO B. Braun Gyöngyös
Fejér-B.Á.L. Veszprém (I)	38–32	(I) Grundfos Tatabánya KC

== Final four ==
The final four will be held on 23–24 April 2022 at the Audi Aréna in Győr.

Semi-finals
23 April, 16:45
Schieszl-Budakalász FKC	27
Fejér-B.Á.L. Veszprém	30
23 April, 19:15
Pick Szeged	27
Telekom Veszprém	30

Final
24 April, 20:00
Fejér-B.Á.L. Veszprém	19
Telekom Veszprém	42
Bronze medal match
24 April, 17:15
Schieszl-Budakalász FKC	20
Pick Szeged	28

=== Awards ===
- Most valuable player:
- Best Goalkeeper:

=== Final standings ===
	Team
	Telekom Veszprém
Silver medal	Fejér-B.Á.L. Veszprém
Bronze medal	Pick Szeged
4th	Schieszl-Budakalász FKC

=== Semi-finals ===
23 April 2022; 16:45	Schieszl-Budakalász FKC	27–30	Fejér-B.Á.L. Veszprém	Audi Aréna, Győr; Attendance: 3,500; Referees: Altmár, Horváth
23 April 2022; 16:45	Varjú 6	(11–16)	Hári, Fazekas 7	Audi Aréna, Győr; Attendance: 3,500; Referees: Altmár, Horváth
23 April 2022; 16:45	8× (suspension) 1× (red card)	Report	9× (suspension)	Audi Aréna, Győr; Attendance: 3,500; Referees: Altmár, Horváth

23 April 2022; 19:15	Pick Szeged	27–30	Telekom Veszprém	Audi Aréna, Győr; Attendance: 4,000; Referees: Horváth, Marton
23 April 2022; 19:15	Bodó 7	(17–15)	Nenadić 7	Audi Aréna, Győr; Attendance: 4,000; Referees: Horváth, Marton
23 April 2022; 19:15	2× (yellow card) 7× (suspension) 1× (red card)	Report	1× (yellow card) 4× (suspension) 1× (red card)	Audi Aréna, Győr; Attendance: 4,000; Referees: Horváth, Marton

=== Bronze medal match ===
24 April 2022; 17:15	Pick Szeged	28–20	Schieszl-Budakalász FKC	Audi Aréna, Győr; Attendance: 2,500; Referees: Őri, Pozdena
24 April 2022; 17:15	Radivojević 9	(14–12)	Sinkovits 5	Audi Aréna, Győr; Attendance: 2,500; Referees: Őri, Pozdena
24 April 2022; 17:15	1× (yellow card) 3× (suspension) 1× (red card)	Report	3× (suspension) 1× (red card)	Audi Aréna, Győr; Attendance: 2,500; Referees: Őri, Pozdena

=== Final ===
24 April 2022; 20:00	Telekom Veszprém	42–19	Fejér-B.Á.L. Veszprém	Audi Aréna, Győr; Attendance: 2,800; Referees: Nagy, Túróczy
24 April 2022; 20:00	Nilsson 10	(23–10)	Széles 5	Audi Aréna, Győr; Attendance: 2,800; Referees: Nagy, Túróczy
24 April 2022; 20:00	1× (yellow card) 3× (suspension)	Report	2× (suspension)	Audi Aréna, Győr; Attendance: 2,800; Referees: Nagy, Túróczy

2021–22 Magyar Kupa
Champion

29th title

Corrales (goalkeeper), Marguč, Omar, Mahé, Blagotinšek, Lauge (c), Štrlek,
Cupara (goalkeeper), Nilsson, Ligetvári, Lukács, Lékai, Nenadić, Maqueda, Sipos, Z. Ilić
Head coach: Momir Ilić, Assistant coach: Péter Gulyás

== See also ==
- 2021–22 Nemzeti Bajnokság I
- 2021–22 Nemzeti Bajnokság I/B
- 2021–22 Nemzeti Bajnokság II
