= 2015–16 Nemzeti Bajnokság I/B (men's handball) =

NB I/B
- Season: 2015–16

The 2015–16 Nemzeti Bajnokság I/B was the 64th season of the Nemzeti Bajnokság I/B, Hungary's premier handball league. Since 2016, the official name of the championship has been K&H Férfi Kézilabda Liga due to sponsorship reasons.

== Team information ==
Location of teams in 2015-16 Nemzeti Bajnokság I/B

=== Western Group (Nyugat) ===
The following 14 clubs compete in the NB I/B (Western) during the 2015–16 season:

Team	Location	Arena
Alba Regia KSE	Székesfehérvár	Videoton Oktatási Központ
Csurgó U23	Csurgó	Sótonyi László Sportcsarnok
Dabas VSE KC	Dabas	OBO Aréna
ETO - SZESE Győr FKC	Győr	Egyetemi Csarnok
Füred U23	Balatonfüred	Észak-Balatoni Konf. Központ
Pécsi VSE	Pécs	Lauber Dezső Sportcsarnok
Százhalombattai KE	Százhalombatta	Városi Szabadidő Központ
Szentendrei KC	Szentendre	Sportcsarnok Budakalász
Szigetszentmiklósi KSK	Szigetszentmiklós	Városi Sportcsarnokra
Tatai AC	Tata	Eötvös J. Gimnázium
Várpalotai BSK	Várpalota	Gál Gyula Városi Sportközpont
Vecsés SE	Vecsés	Városi Sportcsarnok
MKB Veszprém U23	Veszprém	Március 15. úti Sportcsarnok
Veszprémi KSE	Veszprém	Március 15. úti Sportcsarnok

=== Eastern Group (Kelet) ===
The following 14 clubs compete in the NB I/B (Eastern) during the 2015–16 season:

Team	Location	Arena
FKSE Algyő	Algyő	Fehér Ignác Ált. Isk.
Bgy. Kábel SE	Balassagyarmat	Balassagyarmat Sportcsarnok
Békési FKC	Békés	Városi Sportcsarnokban
Ferencváros	Budapest	Elek Gyula Aréna
Füzesabonyi SC	Füzesabony	Teleki Blanka Ált. Isk.
Kecskeméti TE	Kecskemét	Messzi István Sportcsarnok
Mizse KC	Lajosmizse	Polyák Imre Sportcsarnok
VKK Nyírbátor	Nyírbátor	Városi Sportcsarnok
Nyíregyházi KC	Nyíregyháza	Bem József Ált.Isk.
Orosháza U23	Orosháza	Eötvös Sportcsarnok
Ózdi KC	Ózd	Városi Sportcsarnok
Szeged U23	Szeged	Városi stadion
Székács KE	Törökszentmiklós	Székács Sportcsarnok
Törökszentmiklósi KE	Törökszentmiklós	Városi Sportcsarnok

== See also ==
- 2015–16 Nemzeti Bajnokság I
