= Kecskeméti TE (handball) =

Hungarian handball club

- Full name: Kecskeméti Testedző Egyesület
- Short name: KTE
- Arena: Messzi István Sportcsarnok, Kecskemét
- Capacity: 1,200 seats
- League: Nemzeti Bajnokság I/B
- 2021–22: Nemzeti Bajnokság I, 14th of 14 (relegated)
- Club colours
Home	Away

Kecskeméti Testedző Egyesület is a Hungarian handball club from Kecskemét, that played in the Nemzeti Bajnokság I, the top-level championship in Hungary.

Location of Kecskeméti TE

== Crest, colours, supporters ==
=== Naming history ===
Name	Period
Dutép SC Kecskemét	−1993
Delfin-Dutép SC Kecskemét	1993–1997
Dutép-Delfin KC Kecskemét	1997–1999
Kecskeméti Delfin KC	1999–2009
Budapest Bank Kecskemét KKSE	2009–2010
Pajor Pálinka Kecskeméti KSE	2010–2011
Kecskeméti KSE	2011–2013
Kecskeméti TE-Altoterra	2013–2014
Kecskeméti TE-Kisokos	2014–2017
Kecskeméti TE-automatika.hu	2017–2018
Kecskeméti TE-Piroska szörp	2018–present

=== Kits ===
HOME
2009–10	2015–17	2017–18	2021–

AWAY
2009–10	2016–17	2021–

THIRD

2021–

== Sports Hall information ==
- Name: – Messzi István Sportcsarnok
- City: – Kecskemét
- Capacity: – 1200
- Address: – 6000, Olimpia u. 1/A

== Management ==
Position	Name
President	(Hungary) Ferenc Apró
Head Of Communications	(Hungary) Csaba Jámbor
Technical Manager	(Hungary) Ferenc Szeverényi
Sports Associate	(Hungary) István Czenczik
Sports Associate	(Hungary) Mariann Apró-Locskai

== Current squad ==
Squad for the 2021–22 season

Kecskeméti TE
Goalkeepers: 1 (Hungary) Gergő Szél; 59 (Hungary) Barnabás Marczika; 99 (Hungary) Xavér Deményi; Left Wingers: 11 (Hungary) Andor Horváth; 95 (Hungary) Máté Menyhárt; Right Wingers: 17 (Hungary) Marcell Csordás; 23 (Hungary) Ádám Országh; Line Players: 8 (Hungary) Marcell Lőrincz; 34 (Hungary) Miklós Karai; 56 (Hungary) Levente Szrnka	Central Backs: 5 (Hungary) Lajos Mazák; 7 (Japan) Hiramoto Keisuke; 33 (Hungary) Bence Simon; 42 (Hungary) Bence Szeverényi; 44 (Hungary) Tamás Forgács; 72 (Hungary) Bence Vetési; Left Backs: 13 (Hungary) Levente Sipeki; 22 (Hungary) Attila Füstös; Right Backs: 30 (Japan) Enomoto Yuga	Technical staff: Head Coach: (Hungary) József Bencze; Goalkeeping Coach: (Hungary) Zoltán Mogyorós; Physiotherapist: (Hungary) Margó Hirczi; Masseur: (Hungary) Ferenc Szabó

=== Transfers ===
Transfers for the 2021–22 season

Joining

- (Japan) Hiramoto Keisuke (CB) from (Japan) Zeekstar Tokyo
- (Japan) Yuga Enomoto (RB) from (Japan) University of Tsukuba Men's Handball Club
- (Hungary) Máté Menyhárt (LW) from (Hungary) Budai Farkasok KKUK
- (Hungary) Barnabás Marczika (GK) on loan from (Hungary) Pick Szeged U22
- (Hungary) Bence Vetési (CB) on loan from (Hungary) Pick Szeged U22
- (Hungary) Marcell Lőrincz (LP) on loan from (Hungary) Pick Szeged U22
- (Hungary) Miklós Karai (LP) on loan from (Hungary) Ferencvárosi TC
- (Hungary) Xavér Deményi (GK) on loan from (Hungary) Ferencvárosi TC

Leaving

- (Hungary) Olivér Kiss (GK) to (Hungary) Békési FKC
- (Hungary) Richárd Kátai (RB) to (Hungary) Mezőkövesdi KC
- (Hungary) Norbert Tóth (LB) to (Hungary) Ceglédi KKSE

== Previous Squads ==
2020–2021 Team
Shirt No	Nationality	Player	Birth Date	Position
1	Hungary	Gergő Szél	21 January 1998 (age 27)	Goalkeeper
3	Hungary	Bence Simon	4 December 1988 (age 37)	Central Back
5	Hungary	Norbert Tóth	18 January 1986 (age 39)	Left Back
7	Hungary	Zoltán Miss	19 June 1983 (age 42)	Right Winger
8	Hungary	Balázs Bíró	27 September 1983 (age 42)	Central Back
11	Hungary	Andor Horváth	6 November 1996 (age 29)	Left Winger
12	Hungary	Zsolt Sárközi	19 April 1977 (age 48)	Goalkeeper
13	Hungary	Zalán Francia	31 October 2002 (age 23)	Right Winger
15	Hungary	Dániel Kis	16 May 1998 (age 27)	Right Back
16	Hungary	János Podoba	11 July 2000 (age 25)	Goalkeeper
17	Hungary	Marcell Csordás	17 February 1998 (age 27)	Right Winger
19	Hungary	Attila Valaczkai	12 May 1987 (age 38)	Left Back
20	Hungary	József Zaklajda	18 November 1992 (age 33)	Goalkeeper
22	Hungary	Attila Füstös	22 September 1994 (age 31)	Left Back
23	Hungary	Ádám Országh	6 October 1989 (age 36)	Right Winger
24	Hungary	Richárd Kátai	14 October 1994 (age 31)	Right Back
33	Hungary	Gergő Berkes	2 September 1997 (age 28)	Left Winger
42	Hungary	Bence Szeverényi	9 October 2002 (age 23)	Central Back
44	Hungary	Tamás Forgács	26 March 1999 (age 26)	Central Back
55	Hungary	Lajos Mazák	5 February 1989 (age 36)	Central Back
56	Hungary	Levente Szrnka	10 November 1997 (age 28)	Line Player
70	Hungary	Olivér Kiss	25 April 1987 (age 38)	Goalkeeper
93	Hungary	Levente Sipeki	13 August 1993 (age 32)	Left Back
99	Hungary	Ákos Talmácsi	14 December 1992 (age 33)	Line Player

2018–2019 Team
Shirt No	Nationality	Player	Birth Date	Position
4	Hungary	Ádám Petrik-Varga	17 November 1995 (age 30)	Line Player
5	Hungary	Norbert Tóth	18 January 1986 (age 39)	Left Back
6	Hungary	Máté Halász	2 June 1984 (age 41)	Left Back
8	Hungary	Máté Bujdosó	23 August 1991 (age 34)	Central Back
9	Hungary	Milán Csuzi	17 September 1998 (age 27)	Left Back
12	Hungary	Gergő Szél	21 January 1998 (age 27)	Goalkeeper
16	Hungary	János Podoba	11 July 2000 (age 25)	Goalkeeper
20	Hungary	József Zaklajda	18 November 1992 (age 33)	Goalkeeper
22	Hungary	Attila Füstös	22 September 1994 (age 31)	Left Back
23	Hungary	Ádám Dimovics	23 January 1999 (age 26)	Central Back
24	Hungary	Richárd Kátai	14 October 1994 (age 31)	Right Back
33	Hungary	Gergő Berkes	2 September 1997 (age 28)	Left Winger
44	Hungary	Tamás Forgács	26 March 1999 (age 26)	Central Back
55	Hungary	Lajos Mazák	5 February 1989 (age 36)	Central Back
56	Hungary	Levente Szrnka	10 November 1997 (age 28)	Line Player
69	Hungary	János Vajk Gallina	22 May 2000 (age 25)	Right Back
74	Hungary	Tamás Ács	15 April 1999 (age 26)	Right Winger
77	Hungary	Viktor Horváth	14 November 1991 (age 34)	Left Winger
74	Hungary	Marcell Szamos	11 October 1997 (age 28)	Right Winger

== Top Scorers ==
Season	Player	Apps/Goals
2007–2008	(Hungary) Balázs Bíró	22/130
2008–2009	(Hungary) (Serbia) Marinko Kekezović	30/193
2009–2010	(Hungary) (Slovakia) Péter Szabó	25/130
2010–2011	(Hungary) (Slovakia) Péter Szabó	28/131
2011–2012	(Hungary) (Slovakia) Péter Szabó	23/113
2012–2013	Cancelled	
2013–2014	(Hungary) Zoltán Miss	25/144
2014–2015	(Hungary) Zoltán Miss	23/138
2015–2016	(Hungary) Zoltán Miss	26/168
2016–2017	(Hungary) Zoltán Miss	26/144
2017–2018	(Hungary) Richárd Kátai	24/103
2018–2019	(Hungary) Richárd Kátai	22/120
2019–2020	Cancelled	
2020–2021	(Hungary) Ádám Országh	22/103
2021–2022	(Hungary) Máté Menyhárt	26/92
2022–2023	(Hungary) Benedek Szakály	30/184

== Recent seasons ==
As of 31 Aug 2021.

- Seasons in Nemzeti Bajnokság I: 6
- Seasons in Nemzeti Bajnokság I/B: 17

Season	Division	Pos.	Magyar kupa
1993–94	NB II Délkelet	9th	
1994–95	NB II Dél	3rd	
1995–96	NB II Dél	1st	
1996–97	NB I/B Kelet	10th	
1997–98	NB I/B Kelet	7th	
1998–99	NB I/B Kelet	10th	
1999-00	NB I/B Kelet	7th	
2000–01	NB I/B Kelet	11th	
2001–02	NB I/B Kelet	13th	
2002–03	NB II Délkelet	11th	

Season	Division	Pos.	Magyar kupa
2003–04	NB II Dél	11th	
2004–05	NB II Délkelet	1st	
2005–06	NB I/B Kelet	5th	
2006–07	NB I/B Kelet	3rd	
2007–08	NB I/B Kelet	1st	
2008–09	NB I	10th	
2009–10	NB I	8th	
2010–11	NB I	7th	
2011–12	NB I	8th	
2012–13	NB I	locked out	

Season	Division	Pos.	Magyar kupa
2013–14	NB I/B Kelet	12th	
2014–15	NB I/B Kelet	6th	
2015–16	NB I/B Kelet	4th	Round 1
2016–17	NB I/B Kelet	5th	Round 1
2017–18	NB I/B Kelet	4th	Round 2
2018–19	NB I/B Kelet	4th	Round 3
2019–20	NB I/B Kelet	Cancelled	
2020–21	NB I/B Kelet	1st	Round 3
2021–22	NB I	14th	Round 3

== Former club members ==
=== Notable former players ===
- (Hungary) Sándor Bajusz
- (Hungary) Dávid Bakos
- (Hungary) Róbert Berta
- (Hungary) Balázs Bíró
- (Hungary) Máté Halász
- (Hungary) Zoltán Hímer
- (Hungary) (Serbia) Marinko Kekezović
- (Hungary) Gergő Lókodi
- (Hungary) Zoltán Miss
- (Hungary) Ádám Országh
- (Hungary) Bence Simon
- (Hungary) Norbert Sutka
- (Hungary) (Slovakia) Péter Szabó
- (Hungary) Edmond Tóth
- (Hungary) Milán Varsandán
- (Bosnia and Herzegovina) Vladislav Veselinov
- (Croatia) Nikola Knežević
- (United Kingdom) Sebastian Prieto
- (Japan) Yuga Enomoto (2021–2022)
- (Japan) Hiramoto Keisuke (2021–)
- (Slovenia) Janko Škrbić
- (Serbia) Borislav Basarić
- (Serbia) Ilija Belojević
- (Serbia) Dejan Dobardžijev
- (Serbia) Vitomir Kalić
- (Serbia) Goran Vujasin
- (Slovakia) Patrik Hruščák
- (Slovakia) Andrej Petro
- (Slovakia) Michal Shejbal

=== Former coaches ===
Seasons	Coach	Country
2020–	József Bencze	(Hungary)
