= Ceglédi KKSE =

Hungarian handball club

Ceglédi KKSE (Hungary)
- Full name: Ceglédi Kézilabda Klub SE
- Short name: CKKSE
- Founded: 1953; 73 years ago
- Arena: Varga István városi Sportcsarnok, Abony
- Capacity: 500 seats
- President: István Borsos
- Head coach: Norbert Tóth
- League: Nemzeti Bajnokság I/B
- Club colours
Home	Away

Ceglédi Kézilabda Klub SE is a Hungarian handball club from Cegléd, that plays in the Nemzeti Bajnokság I/B.

Location of Ceglédi KKSE

== Crest, colours, supporters ==
=== Naming history ===
Name	Period
Ceglédi Építők	−1973
Ceglédi KÖZGÉP	1974-1977
Ceglédi ÚTTRÖSZT	1978–1981
Ceglédi KÖZGÉP	1982–1983
Ceglédi Úttröszt Közgép	1983–1984
Ceglédi KÖZGÉP SE	1984–1990
Agrokontakt Cegléd	1990–1991
Biokontakt Cegléd	1991–1992
Cegléd Invest KC	1992–1993
Agrokontakt SE Cegléd	1993–1996
Cegép SE-Cegléd	1996–1999
Cegép KK-Cegléd	1999–2000
Ceglédi KK	2000–2004
Ceglédi KKKSE	2004–2006
DOGERITA Ásványvíz Ceglédi KKSE	2006–2009
Ceglédi KKSE	2009–2022
HÉP-Cegléd	2022–present

=== Kit manufacturers and Shirt sponsor ===
The following table shows in detail Ceglédi KKSE kit manufacturers and shirt sponsors by year:

Kit manufacturers

Period	Kit manufacturer
– 2017	(Germany) Erima
2017–2018	(Denmark) Hummel
2018–2021	(Hungary) 2Rule
2021–present	(Germany) Puma

Shirt sponsor

Period	Sponsor
2012–2014	BSS 2000 Kft.
2014–2015	-
2015–2016	Szerencsejáték Zrt.
2016–2017	tippmixPro
2017–2018	tippmix
2018–2019	tippmix / Ép-GéPéSZ Holding Kft. / KNOTT Technik-Flex Kft. / Ecseri Kft.
2019–2020	-
2020–present	tippmix / Skoda Ceglédi Autóház

=== Kits ===
HOME
2017–18	2021-22

AWAY
2017–18	2022-23

THIRD
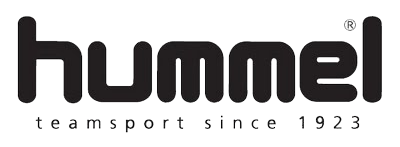
2017–18

== Sports Hall information ==
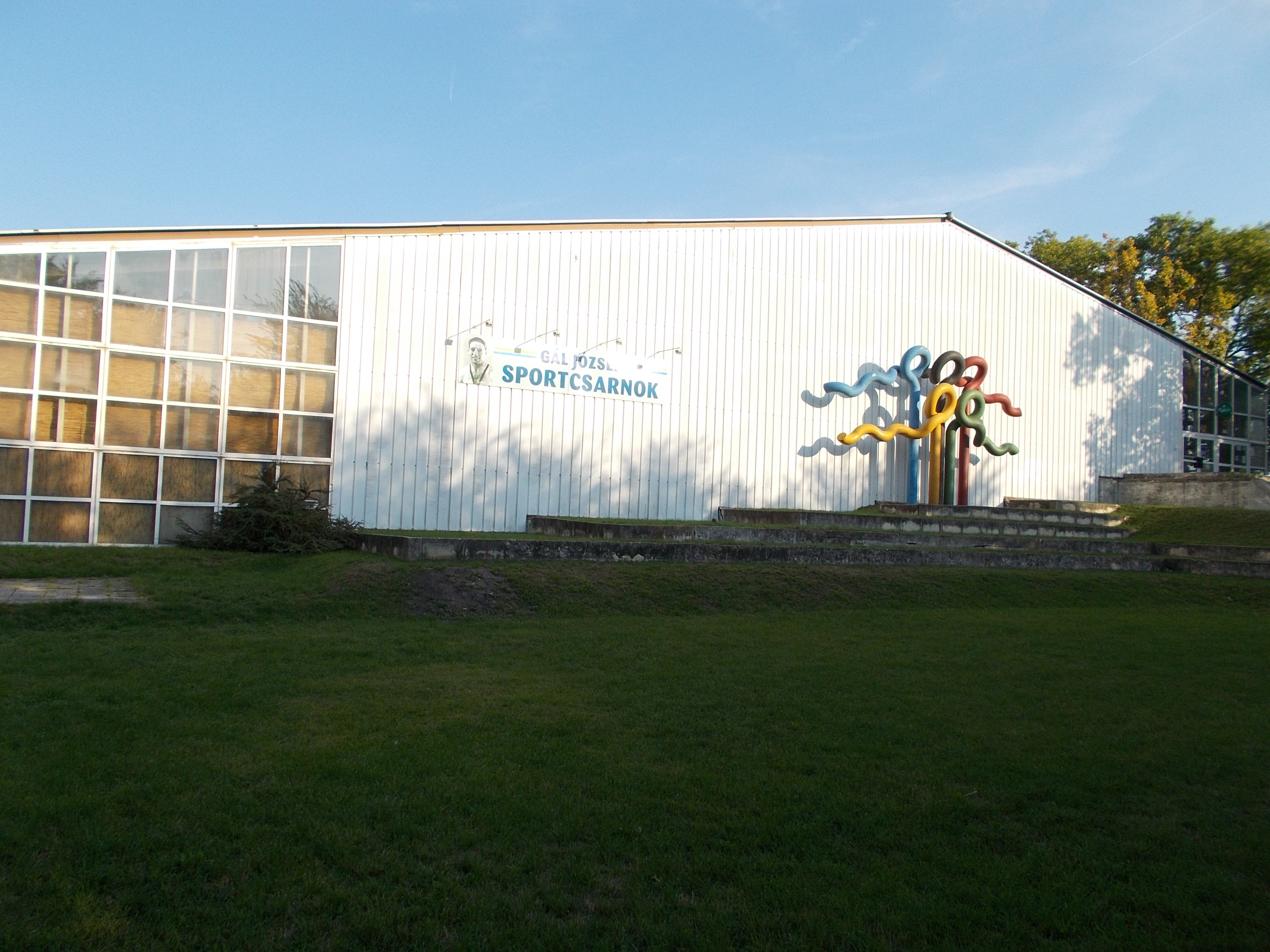
Home hall: Gál József Sportcsarnok

- Name: – Gál József Sportcsarnok
- City: – Cegléd
- Capacity: – 1046
- Address: – 2700 Cegléd, Rákóczi út 33.

== Team ==
=== Current squad ===
Squad for the 2024–25 season

Ceglédi KKSE

Goalkeepers

- 74 (Hungary) Tamás Aleksza
- (Hungary) István Varga
- (Hungary) Pál Berki

Left Wingers

- (Hungary) Ákos Angebrandt
- (Hungary) Bálint Horváth

Right Wingers

- 66 (Hungary) Bence Farkas
- (Hungary) Kevin Rozner

Line Players

- (Hungary) Szabolcs Döme
- (Hungary) Márk Dávid
- (Hungary) Bence Kaposvári

Central Backs

- 20 (Hungary) Barnabás Panghy
- 32 (Hungary) Adrián Nagy
- (Hungary) Bence Vetési

Left Backs

- 58 (Hungary) Bence Bartha
- (Hungary) Levente Halász
- (Hungary) Szabolcs Lendvai

Right Backs

- (Hungary) Máté Racskó
- (Hungary) Márk Juráskó

=== Technical staff ===
- Head coach: (Hungary) Norbert Tóth
- Assistant coach: (Hungary) Tamás Neukum
- Goalkeeping coach: (Bosnia and Herzegovina) (Hungary) Haris Porobic
- Fitness coach: (Hungary) Zoltán Kővágó
- Masseur: (Hungary) Zoltán Tóth
- Club doctor: (Hungary) Csaba Elekes

=== Transfers ===
Transfers for the 2024–25 season

Joining

- (Hungary) Szabolcs Döme (LP) from (Hungary) QHB-Eger
- (Hungary) Bence Vetési (CB) from (Hungary) Veszprémi KKFT
- (Hungary) Máté Racskó (RB) from (Hungary) Veszprémi KKFT
- (Hungary) Levente Halász (LB) from (Hungary) Budakalász FKC
- (Hungary) Márk Juráskó (RB) from (Hungary) NEKA
- (Hungary) Szabolcs Lendvai (LB) from (Hungary) NEKA U21
- (Hungary) István Varga (GK) from (Hungary) Győri ETO-UNI FKC
- (Hungary) Ákos Angebrandt (LW) from (Hungary) Vecsési SE
- (Hungary) Kevin Rozner (RW) from (Hungary) Ózdi KC
- (Hungary) Márk Dávid (LP) from (Hungary) Békési FKC
- (Hungary) Bálint Horváth (LW) from (Hungary) Kecskeméti TE
- (Hungary) Bence Kaposvári (LP) from (Hungary) Kecskeméti TE

Leaving

- (Hungary) Károly Juhász (CB) (retires)
- (Hungary) Zsolt Tamási (GK) (retires)
- (Hungary) Bálint Ág (LW) to (Hungary) Dabas KK
- (Hungary) Patrik Markovics (RB) to Veszprémi KKFT
- (Hungary) Gergő Spekhardt (LP) to (Hungary) Budai Farkasok KKUK
- (Hungary) Ákos Pásztor (RW)
- (Hungary) Balázs Szűcs (RW)
- (Hungary) Levente Teleki (LP)
- (Hungary) Bence Dobi (CB)
- (Hungary) Péter Határ (LB)
- (Hungary) Martin Kállai (RB)
- (Hungary) Dominik Vrhovina (LP) loan back to (Hungary) Budakalász FKC
- (Hungary) Nikola Székely (LP) loan back to (Hungary) Csépe Salgótarjáni SKC

Transfers for the 2023–24 season

Joining

- (Hungary) Bálint Ág (LW) from (Hungary) Balatonfüredi KSE
- (Hungary) Péter Határ (LB) from (Hungary) Balatonfüredi KSE
- (Hungary) Bence Dobi (CB) from (Hungary) NEKA
- (Hungary) Dominik Vrhovina (LP) on loan from (Hungary) Budakalász FKC
- (Hungary) Nikola Székely (LP) on loan from (Hungary) Csépe Salgótarjáni SKC

Leaving

- (Hungary) Gábor Császár (CB) (retires)
- (Hungary) (Iran) Iman Jamali (LB) to (Hungary) MOL Tatabánya KC
- (Slovakia) Martin Mazak (LP) to (Hungary) Szigetszentmiklósi KSK
- (Hungary) Márton Tóth (CB) to (Hungary) Szigetszentmiklósi KSK
- (Hungary) Zoltán Kránitz (GK) to (Hungary) PLER-Budapest
- (Hungary) István Szepesi (LW) to (Hungary) Diósgyőri VTK
- (Hungary) Péter Kende (CB) to (Hungary) Budai Farkasok KKUK
- (Hungary) Tamás Csomor (LW)

Transfers for the 2022–23 season

Joining

- (Hungary) Bence Bartha (LB) from (France) Strasbourg Eurométropole HB
- (Hungary) Péter Kende (CB) from (Hungary) Ferencvárosi TC
- (Hungary) Márton Tóth (CB) from (Hungary) Veszprém KKFT Felsőörs
- (Hungary) Patrik Markovics (RB) from (Hungary) BFKA–Veszprém
- (Hungary) Balázs Szűcs (RW) from (Hungary) BFKA–Veszprém
- (Hungary) Péter Hajdú (LB) from (Hungary) Salgótarjáni SKC
- (Hungary) Tamás Aleksza (GK) from (Hungary) NEKA
- (Hungary) (Iran) Iman Jamali (LB) from (Romania) Dinamo București

Leaving

- (Hungary) Norbert Tóth (LB) (retires)
- (Hungary) Norbert Gyene (RW) to (Hungary) KK Ajka
- (Hungary) Patrik Tóth (CB) to (Hungary) KK Ajka
- (Hungary) Péter Hajdú (LB) to (Hungary) Salgótarjáni SKC

Transfers for the 2021–22 season

Joining

- (Hungary) Tamás Csomor (LW) from (Hungary) Sport36-Komló
- (Hungary) Péter Simányi (RB) from (Hungary) Rév TSC
- (Hungary) Norbert Tóth (LB) from (Hungary) Kecskeméti TE
- (Hungary) Patrik Tóth (CB) from (Hungary) Ózdi KC
- (Hungary) Péter Ács (RB) on loan from (Hungary) Csurgói KK
- (Hungary) Károly Juhász (CB) from (Hungary) Csurgói KK

Leaving

- (Hungary) Károly Juhász (CB) to (Hungary) Csurgói KK
- (Hungary) Balázs Németh (CB) to (Hungary) Balatonfüredi KSE
- (Hungary) Roland Kiss (CB) to (Hungary) Orosházi FKSE
- (Bosnia and Herzegovina) Tarik Vranac (LB) to (Hungary) Sport36-Komló
- (Hungary) Benjamin Sinkovits (RB) to (Hungary) Budakalász FKC
- (Hungary) Péter Ács (RB) loan back to (Hungary) Csurgói KK

Transfers for the 2020–21 season

Joining

- (Hungary) Balázs Németh (CB) from (Hungary) Balatonfüredi KSE
- (Hungary) Martin Kállai (RB) from (Hungary) Váci KSE
- (Hungary) Levente Teleki (LP) from (Hungary) Balmazújvárosi KK
- (Hungary) Benjamin Sinkovits (RB) from (Hungary) Budakalász FKC
- (Hungary) Ákos Pásztor (RW) from (Hungary) Grundfos Tatabánya KC
- (Hungary) Bence Zakics (LW) from (Hungary) Dabas KK
- (Bosnia and Herzegovina) Tarik Vranac (LB) from (Hungary) Balatonfüredi KSE
- (Slovakia) Martin Mazak (LP) from (Hungary) Budakalász FKC

Leaving

- (Hungary) Péter Hajdú (LB) to (Hungary) Dabas KK
- (Hungary) Alex Németh (CB) to (Hungary) Budai Farkasok KKUK
- (Hungary) Szabolcs Lászlai (LW) to (Hungary) Orosházi FKSE
- (Hungary) Tamás Aleksza (GK) to (Hungary) NEKA
- (Hungary) János Müller (LP) to (Hungary) Rév TSC
- (Hungary) Benjamin Sinkovits (RB) on loan at (Hungary) Rév TSC
- (Hungary) Gergő Rózsavölgyi (GK) on loan at (Hungary) Mizse KC

Transfers for the 2019–20 season

Joining

- (Hungary) (Serbia) Milorad Krivokapić (RB) from (Hungary) Gyöngyösi KK
- (Hungary) István Szepesi (LW) from (Hungary) SBS-Eger
- (Hungary) Ákos Sandor (LP) from (Hungary) Balassagyarmati Kábel SE
- (Hungary) Norbert Gyene (RW) from (Hungary) Veszprém KKFT Felsőörs
- (Hungary) Gergő Rózsavölgyi (GK) from (Greece) AEK Athens
- (Hungary) Zoltán Kránitz (GK) from (Hungary) Vecsési SE
- (Hungary) Patrik Vizes (CB) from (Australia) Sydney University Handball Club
- (Hungary) Péter Hajdú (LB) from (Hungary) Békési FKC
- (Hungary) Roland Kiss (CB) from (Hungary) Balmazújvárosi KK
- (Hungary) Alex Németh (CB) from (Hungary) Váci KSE

Leaving

- (Montenegro) Marko Čampar (LP) to (Israel) Hapoel Kiryat Ono
- (Slovakia) Jakub Mikita (LB) to (Hungary) Ferencvárosi TC
- (Serbia) Milos Mojsilov (GK) to (Hungary) Mezőkövesdi KC
- (Serbia) Milan Vučković (LB) to (Serbia) RK Vojvodina
- (Croatia) Bruno-Vili Zobec (RB) to (Hungary) Sport36-Komló
- (Hungary) Marcell Gábor (LB) to (Hungary) Budakalász FKC
- (Hungary) Rajmund Pocsai (RW) to (Hungary) Szigetszentmiklósi KSK
- (Hungary) Lóránd Hódi (LW) to (Hungary) Szigetszentmiklósi KSK
- (Hungary) Bence Szabó (LP) to (Hungary) Dabas KK
- (Hungary) Zsolt Schäffer (RB) loan back to (Hungary) Grundfos Tatabánya KC
- (Bosnia and Herzegovina) Marko Davidovic (CB) loan back to (Hungary) Váci KSE

Transfers for the 2018–19 season

Joining

- (Serbia) Milan Vučković (LB) from (Serbia) RK Železničar 1949
- (Croatia) Bruno-Vili Zobec (RB) from (Croatia) GRK Varaždin
- (Montenegro) Marko Čampar (LP) from (Romania) HC Vaslui
- (Hungary) Zsolt Tamási (GK) from (Hungary) Budakalász FKC
- (Hungary) Rajmund Pocsai (RW) from (Hungary) Dabas KK
- (Hungary) Marcell Gábor (LB) from (Hungary) NEKA
- (Hungary) Tamás Kecskeméti (RW) from (Hungary) Váci KSE
- (Slovakia) Jakub Mikita (LB) from (France) Cesson Rennes MHB
- (Hungary) Gergő Spekhardt (LP) from (Hungary) Vecsési SE
- (Hungary) Zsolt Schäffer (RB) on loan from (Hungary) Grundfos Tatabánya KC
- (Bosnia and Herzegovina) Marko Davidovic (CB) on loan from (Hungary) Váci KSE

Leaving

- (Montenegro) Nemanja Grbović (LP) to (Romania) Steaua București
- (Montenegro) Mirko Radović (RW) to (Montenegro) RK Lovćen
- (Hungary) Tamás Borsos (LB) to (Hungary) Dabas KK
- (Hungary) Péter Pallag (GK) to (Hungary) Csurgói KK
- (Hungary) Károly Attila Tóth (CB) to (Hungary) Tungsram SE Nagykanizsa
- (Hungary) Máté Dávid (LP) to (Hungary) Mezőkövesdi KC
- (Croatia) Tomislav Radnić (CB) to (Hungary) Mezőkövesdi KC

Transfers for the 2017–18 season

Joining

- (Serbia) Uroš Elezović (LB) from (Israel) HC Ramat HaSharon
- (Hungary) Károly Juhász (CB) from (Hungary) Gyöngyösi KK
- (Croatia) Tomislav Radnić (CB) from (Hungary) Mezőkövesdi KC
- (Hungary) Tamás Hajdu (CB) from (Hungary) Dabas KK

Leaving

- (Montenegro) Božo Anđelić (CB) to (North Macedonia) RK Metalurg Skopje
- (Hungary) Balázs Bíró (CB) to (Hungary) Dabas KK
- (Hungary) Dániel Bősz (GK) to (Hungary) Balatonfüredi KSE
- (Hungary) Máté Gidai (RW) to (Hungary) Nyíregyházi SC
- (Hungary) Dániel Fiar (CB) to (Hungary) Vecsési SE
- (Hungary) Norbert Tóth (LB) to (Hungary) Vecsési SE
- (Montenegro) Ivan Perišić (RB) to (Hungary) Dabas KK
- (Serbia) Luka Karanović (RB) to (Bosnia and Herzegovina) RK Sloga Doboj
- (Serbia) Uroš Elezović (LB) to (Serbia) RK Dinamo Pančevo

Transfers for the 2016–17 season

Joining

- (Hungary) Péter Pallag (GK) from (Romania) AHC Potaissa Turda
- (Hungary) Máté Gidai (RW) from (Hungary) MOL-Pick Szeged
- (Hungary) Bence Szabó (LP) from (Hungary) MOL-Pick Szeged
- (Hungary) Máté Dávid (LP) from (Hungary) Telekom Veszprém
- (Hungary) Károly Attila Tóth (CB) from (Hungary) Csurgói KK
- (Hungary) Dániel Fiar (CB) from (Hungary) PLER KC
- (Montenegro) Mirko Radović (RW) from (France) Valence Handball

Leaving

- (Montenegro) Vladan Abramović (GK) to (Sweden) HIF Karlskrona
- (Hungary) Ádám Országh (RW) to (Hungary) Gyöngyösi KK
- (Hungary) Levente Sipeki (LB) to (Hungary) Gyöngyösi KK
- (Hungary) Attila Kun (LB) to (Switzerland) HC Gelb Schwarz Stäfa
- (Hungary) Sándor Lepsényi (LB) to (Hungary) Dabas KK

Transfers for the 2015–16 season

Joining

- (Montenegro) Božo Anđelić (CB) from (Sweden) HK Malmö
- (Montenegro) Vladan Abramović (GK) from (Turkey) Adana Cukobirlik SK
- (Hungary) Tamás Borsos (LB) from (Hungary) Csurgói KK
- (Serbia) Luka Karanović (RB) from (Hungary) Csurgói KK
- (Hungary) Péter Megyeri (RW) from (Hungary) Csurgói KK
- (Hungary) Attila Kun (LB) from (Hungary) Sport36-Komló

Leaving

- (Hungary) László Bartucz (GK) to (Hungary) Csurgói KK
- (Hungary) Bence Takács (CB) to (Hungary) SBS-Eger
- (Hungary) Rajmund Pocsai (RW) to (Hungary) Dabas KK
- (Hungary) Szabolcs Antal (LP) to (Hungary) Mezőkövesdi KC
- (Hungary) Renátó Nikolicza (LB) to (Hungary) Ferencvárosi TC
- (Hungary) Márk Hegedűs (LP) loan back to (Hungary) MOL-Pick Szeged

Transfers for the 2014–15 season

Joining

- (Hungary) Ádám Országh (RW) from (Hungary) Csurgói KK
- (Hungary) Renátó Nikolicza (LB) from (Hungary) Váci KSE
- (Hungary) Levente Sipeki (LB) from (Hungary) Békési FKC
- (Hungary) Márk Hegedűs (LP) on loan from (Hungary) MOL-Pick Szeged
- (Montenegro) Nemanja Grbović (LP) from (Serbia) RK Radnički Kragujevac

Leaving

- (Montenegro) Mirko Vujović (CB) to (Hungary) Pécsi VSE
- (Hungary) Zoltán Dengi (LP) to (Hungary) Törökszentmiklósi KE
- (Hungary) Dezső Endrédi (RW) to (Hungary) Tatai AC
- (Hungary) László Lakos (GK) to (Hungary) Ferencvárosi TC

Transfers for the 2013–14 season

Joining

- (Montenegro) Ivan Perišić (RB) from (Montenegro) RK Lovćen
- (Montenegro) Mirko Vujović (CB) from (Montenegro) RK Budvanska Rivijera
- (Hungary) Dániel Bősz (GK) from (Hungary) Pécsi VSE
- (Hungary) Szabolcs Lászlai (LW) from (Hungary) Orosházi FKSE
- (Hungary) Norbert Sutka (LB) from (Germany) DJK Waldbüttelbrunn
- (Hungary) Dezső Endrédi (RW) from (Hungary) Tatai AC
- (Hungary) Viktor Benke (CB) from (Hungary) Kecskeméti TE

Leaving

- (Japan) Atsushi Mekaru (CB) to (Hungary) Gyöngyösi KK
- (Cuba) Misael Iglesias (GK) to (France) ASB Rezé Handball
- (Cuba) José Savon (RW) to (Hungary) Balassagyarmati Kábel SE
- (Hungary) Edmond Tóth (RB) (retires)
- (Hungary) Zsolt Dobó (LB) to (Hungary) Mezőkövesdi KC
- (Hungary) László Erdélyi (GK) to (Hungary) Törökszentmiklósi KE
- (Hungary) Norbert Sutka (LB) to (Hungary) Szentendre KC

== Previous Squads ==
2017–2018 Team
Shirt No	Nationality	Player	Birth Date	Position
1	Serbia	Milos Mojsilov	11 September 1992 (age 33)	Goalkeeper
5	Hungary	Károly Juhász	2 April 1987 (age 39)	Central Back
7	Hungary	Szabolcs Lászlai	16 September 1992 (age 33)	Left Winger
8	Hungary	Lóránd Hódi	18 February 1990 (age 36)	Left Winger
10	Croatia	Tomislav Radnić	7 January 1990 (age 36)	Central Back
12	Hungary	Tamás Aleksza	15 November 2001 (age 24)	Goalkeeper
13	Montenegro	Mirko Radović	15 June 1990 (age 35)	Right Winger
14	Hungary	Bence Jenő Csapi	14 August 1998 (age 27)	Left Back
15	Hungary	Tamás Borsos	13 June 1990 (age 35)	Left Back
17	Hungary	Bence Szabó	11 August 1994 (age 31)	Line Player
18	Hungary	János Müller	15 February 1997 (age 29)	Line Player
23	Hungary	Tamás Hajdu	25 November 1992 (age 33)	Central Back
29	Hungary	Péter Pallag	22 May 1990 (age 35)	Goalkeeper
31	Hungary	Ferenc Imregi	5 September 1997 (age 28)	Left Winger
33	Montenegro	Ivan Perišić	21 April 1990 (age 36)	Right Back
41	Hungary	Károly Attila Tóth	31 July 1995 (age 30)	Central Back
55	Hungary	Péter Megyeri	26 June 1994 (age 31)	Right Winger
88	Serbia	Uroš Elezović	28 January 1982 (age 44)	Left Back
90	Montenegro	Nemanja Grbović	26 April 1990 (age 35)	Line Player
99	Hungary	Máté Dávid	24 September 1996 (age 29)	Line Player

2015–2016 Team
Shirt No	Nationality	Player	Birth Date	Position
1	Serbia	Milos Mojsilov	11 September 1992 (age 33)	Goalkeeper
3	Hungary	Ádám Országh	6 October 1989 (age 36)	Right Winger
5	Hungary	Norbert Tóth	18 January 1986 (age 40)	Left Back
6	Serbia	Luka Karanović	9 May 1998 (age 27)	Right Back
7	Hungary	Szabolcs Lászlai	16 September 1992 (age 33)	Left Winger
8	Hungary	Lóránd Hódi	18 February 1990 (age 36)	Left Winger
10	Hungary	Attila Kun	12 May 1994 (age 31)	Left Back
12	Montenegro	Vladan Abramović	14 October 1992 (age 33)	Goalkeeper
13	Hungary	Levente Sipeki	13 August 1993 (age 32)	Left Back
15	Hungary	Tamás Borsos	13 June 1990 (age 35)	Left Back
16	Hungary	Dániel Bősz	21 January 1991 (age 35)	Goalkeeper
17	Hungary	János Müller	15 February 1997 (age 29)	Line Player
20	Hungary	Sándor Lepsényi	23 March 1989 (age 37)	Left Back
23	Montenegro	Božo Anđelić	27 November 1990 (age 35)	Central Back
31	Hungary	Ferenc Imregi	5 September 1997 (age 28)	Left Winger
33	Montenegro	Ivan Perišić	21 April 1990 (age 36)	Right Back
42	Hungary	László Nagy	5 October 1995 (age 30)	Goalkeeper
55	Hungary	Péter Megyeri	26 June 1994 (age 31)	Right Winger
88	Hungary	Balázs Bíró	27 September 1983 (age 42)	Central Back
90	Montenegro	Nemanja Grbović	26 April 1990 (age 35)	Line Player

2014–2015 Team
Shirt No	Nationality	Player	Birth Date	Position
1	Serbia	Milos Mojsilov	11 September 1992 (age 33)	Goalkeeper
3	Hungary	Ádám Országh	6 October 1989 (age 36)	Right Winger
5	Hungary	Norbert Tóth	18 January 1986 (age 40)	Left Back
7	Hungary	Szabolcs Lászlai	16 September 1992 (age 33)	Left Winger
8	Hungary	Lóránd Hódi	18 February 1990 (age 36)	Left Winger
9	Hungary	Márk Hegedűs	14 September 1992 (age 33)	Line Player
11	Hungary	Szabolcs Egyed	6 April 1994 (age 32)	Left Back
12	Hungary	László Nagy	5 October 1995 (age 30)	Goalkeeper
13	Hungary	Levente Sipeki	13 August 1993 (age 32)	Left Back
16	Hungary	Dániel Bősz	21 January 1991 (age 35)	Goalkeeper
17	Hungary	János Müller	15 February 1997 (age 29)	Line Player
18	Hungary	Viktor Bányai	31 August 1993 (age 32)	Right Winger
20	Hungary	Sándor Lepsényi	23 March 1989 (age 37)	Left Back
22	Hungary	Renátó Nikolicza	24 July 1989 (age 36)	Left Back
23	Hungary	Bence Takács	1 November 1990 (age 35)	Central Back
24	Hungary	István Gigler	23 March 1981 (age 45)	Right Winger
26	Hungary	László Bartucz	5 November 1991 (age 34)	Goalkeeper
33	Montenegro	Ivan Perišić	21 April 1990 (age 36)	Right Back
77	Hungary	Szabolcs Antal	7 July 1990 (age 35)	Line Player
84	Hungary	Rajmund Pocsai	30 December 1984 (age 41)	Right Winger
88	Hungary	Balázs Bíró	27 September 1983 (age 42)	Central Back
90	Montenegro	Nemanja Grbović	26 April 1990 (age 35)	Line Player

== Top Scorers ==
Season	Player	Apps/Goals
2022–2023	(Hungary) (Iran) Iman Jamali	15/105

== Honours ==
Honours		No.	Years
League
Nemzeti Bajnokság I/B	Winners	3	1991–92, 1994–95, 2011–12
Nemzeti Bajnokság I/B	Runners-up	3	1993–94, 1995–96, 1996–97
Nemzeti Bajnokság I/B	Third Place	2	1990–91, 2010–11
Domestic Cups
Magyar Kupa	Third Place	1	2000–01

== Recent seasons ==
As of 21 Aug 2020.

- Seasons in Nemzeti Bajnokság I: 15
- Seasons in Nemzeti Bajnokság I/B: 27
- Seasons in Nemzeti Bajnokság II: 14

Season	Division	Pos.	Magyar kupa
1954	County I		
1955	County I		
1956	County I		
1957	County I		
1958	County I		Did not held
1959	County I		Did not held
1960	County I		Did not held
1961	County I		Did not held
1962	County I		Did not held
1963	County I	1st	
1964	NB II Közép	6th	
1965	NB II Közép	8th	
1966	NB II Közép	5th	
1967	NB II Közép	8th	
1968	NB II Közép	10th	
1969	NB II Közép	11th	
1970	County I	1st	
1971	NB II Közép	2nd	
1972	NB II Közép	2nd	
1973	NB I/B	11th	
1974	NB II Közép	3rd	
1975	NB II Közép	6th	Did not held
1976	NB II Közép	1st	

Season	Division	Pos.	Magyar kupa
1977	NB I/B	10th	
1978	NB I/B	9th	
1979	NB I/B	12th	
1980	NB I/B	10th	
1981	NB I/B	14th	
1982	NB II Közép	3rd	
1983	NB II Közép	1st	*
1984	NB I/B	7th	
1985	NB I/B	9th	
1986	NB I/B	9th	
1987	NB I/B	8th	
1988	NB I/B	9th	
1989–90	NB I/B	11th	
1990–91	NB I/B Kelet	3rd	
1991–92	NB I/B Kelet	1st	
1992–93	NB I	16th	
1993–94	NB I/B Kelet	2nd	
1994–95	NB I/B Kelet	1st	
1995–96	NB I/B Kelet	2nd	
1996–97	NB I/B Kelet	2nd	
1997–98	NB I	11th	
1998–99	NB I	8th	
1999-00	NB I	7th	

Season	Division	Pos.	Magyar kupa
2000–01	NB I	7th	Third place
2001–02	NB I	5th	Fourth place
2002–03	NB I	6th	
2003–04	NB I/B Kelet	7th	
2004–05	NB I/B Kelet	8th	
2005–06	NB I/B Kelet	9th	
2006–07	NB I/B Kelet	12th	
2007–08	NB I/B Kelet	11th	
2008–09	NB II Kelet	1st	
2009–10	NB I/B Kelet	8th	
2010–11	NB I/B Kelet	3rd	Round 2
2011–12	NB I/B Kelet	1st	Round 4
2012–13	NB I	10th	Round 4
2013–14	NB I	9th	Quarter-finals
2014–15	NB I	9th	Quarter-finals
2015–16	NB I	12th	Round 4
2016–17	NB I	11th	Round 4
2017–18	NB I	10th	Round 4
2018–19	NB I	13th	Round 4
2019–20	NB I/B Kelet	Cancelled	
2020–21	NB I	13th	Round 4

- 1983 Magyar kupa (December):
- 1988–89 Magyar kupa:

== EHF Ranking ==
As of 01/10/2021

Rank	Team	Points
352	(Greece) GAS Kilkis	1
353	(Georgia (country)) Samtredia	0
354	(Sweden) Hammarby IF Handboll	0
355	(Hungary) Ceglédi KKSE	0
356	(England) Leeds Hornets HC	0
357	(Moldova) ULIM-Alexia Chișinău	0
358	(Montenegro) RK Boka	0

== Former club members ==
=== Notable former players ===
- (Hungary) László Bartucz
- (Hungary) Balázs Bíró
- (Hungary) Tamás Borsos
- (Hungary) Dániel Bősz
- (Hungary) Norbert Gyene
- (Hungary) Márk Hegedűs
- (Hungary) (Iran) Iman Jamali (2022–2023)
- (Hungary) (Serbia) Milorad Krivokapić
- (Hungary) Ádám Országh
- (Hungary) Péter Pallag
- (Hungary) Ákos Pásztor
- (Hungary) Ákos Sandor
- (Hungary) Norbert Sutka
- (Hungary) István Szepesi
- (Hungary) Edmond Tóth
- (Hungary) Bence Zakics
- (Bosnia and Herzegovina) Marko Davidovic
- (Bosnia and Herzegovina) Tarik Vranac
- (Croatia) Tomislav Radnić
- (Croatia) Bruno-Vili Zobec
- (Cuba) Misael Iglesias
- (Cuba) José Savon
- (Japan) Atsushi Mekaru
- (Montenegro) Vladan Abramović
- (Montenegro) Božo Anđelić
- (Montenegro) Marko Čampar
- (Montenegro) Nemanja Grbović
- (Montenegro) Ivan Perišić
- (Montenegro) Mirko Radović
- (Montenegro) Mirko Vujović
- (Romania) Costică Buceschi (2002–2003)
- (Romania) Marius Novanc (2001–2002)
- (Serbia) Uroš Elezović
- (Serbia) Luka Karanović
- (Serbia) Milos Mojsilov
- (Serbia) Milan Vučković
- (Slovakia) Martin Mazak
- (Slovakia) Jakub Mikita
