= Yuga Enomoto =

Japanese handball player (born 2000)

Personal information
- Nationality: Japanese
- Born: 20 December 2000 (age 25) Tokyo, Japan
- Height: 1.75 m (5 ft 9 in)

Sport
- Sport: Handball
- Position: Right Back/Right Wing
- Current club: RK Vojvodina
- Number: 30

Senior clubs
- Years: Team
- –2020: (Japan) Univ. of Tsukuba
- 2021–2022: (Hungary) Kecskeméti TE
- 2022–2023: (Hungary) Budai Farkasok KKUK
- 2023–2025: (Hungary) MOL Tatabánya KC
- 2025–2026: (Serbia) RK Vojvodina
- 2026–: (Hungary) Győri ETO-UNI FKC
National team
- Years: Team
- –: Japan
Medal record
Asian Championship
Silver medal – second place	2024 Bahrain

Yuga Enomoto (Japanese: 榎本悠雅, born 20 December 2000) is a Japanese handball player for RK Vojvodina and the Japanese national team.

== Career ==
=== Club ===
Yuga Enomoto played in Japan until 2021. In August 2021, he transferred to Hungary to the Nemzeti Bajnokság I rookie team Kecskeméti TE. At the end of the season, Kecskeméti TE was relegated from the top flight, so in the summer of 2022 he transferred to the newly promoted Budai Farkasok KKUK. In the summer of 2023, he transferred to the No. 3 Hungarian team, MOL Tatabánya KC. In the 2023/24 season, it finished third in the league and was able to play in the EHF European League. He scored 17 goals in 6 matches in the EHF European League. In the 2024/25 season, she scored 17 goals in 10 matches in the EHF European League. In April 2025, it was announced that he would join Serbian team RK Vojvodina in the summer.

== Honours ==
=== National team ===
- Asian Championship:
  - Silver: 2024

=== Club ===
MOL Tatabánya KC

- Nemzeti Bajnokság I
  - Bronze: 2024
- Magyar Kupa
  - Bronze: 2025

RK Vojvodina

- Serbian League
  - Silver: 2026
