= 2016–17 Magyar Kupa (men's handball) =

59th Hungarian men's handball competition

Tournament details
- Country: Hungary
- Dates: 2 September 2016 – 15 April 2017
- Teams: 46

Final positions
- Champions: Telekom Veszprém (26th title)
- Runners-up: MOL-Pick Szeged

Tournament statistics
- Matches played: 42 + 4 (Final four)

The 2016–17 Magyar Kupa, known as (Hungarian: TIPPMIX férfi Magyar Kupa) for sponsorship reasons, was the 59th edition of the tournament.

== Schedule ==
The rounds of the 2016–17 competition are scheduled as follows:

Round	Draw date and time	Matches
Round I	2 August 2016, 13:00 CEST	21 September 2016
Round II	27 September 2016, 13:00 CEST	5 October 2016
Round III	11 October 2016, 13:00 CEST	26 October 2016
Round IV	15 November 2016, 11:00 CET	4 February 2017
Round V	7 February 2017, 11:00 CET	16 March 2017
Final four	21 March 2017, 11:00 CET	14–15 April 2017

== Matches ==
A total of 46 matches will take place, starting with Round I on 2 September 2016 and culminating with the Final on 15 April 2017 at the Főnix Hall in Debrecen.

=== Round I ===
The first round ties are scheduled for 2 – 21 September 2016.

Team 1	Score	Team 2
2 September
VSK Tököl (II)	22–28	Százhalombattai KE (I/B)
6 September
Balassagyarmati Kábel SE (I/B)	35–27	VKK Nyírbátor (I/B)
14 September
Ferencvárosi TC (I/B)	29–25	Dabas VSE KC (I/B)
Békés-Drén KC (I/B)	31–26	Fiatal Kézilabdások SE ( )
Törökszentmiklósi KE (I/B)	44–25	KTE-Kisokos (I/B)
15 September
Csepeli DSE (Count. I)	23–31	Budai Farkasok KK (Count. I)
Bp. Elektromos SE (II)	29–32	Mizse KC (I/B)
20 September
Szigetszetmiklósi KSK (I/B)	28–33	PLER-Budapest (I/B)
21 September
Bakonyerdő Pápa (II)	29–41	Alba-MÁV Előre (I/B)
NEKA (I/B)	34–34 (a)	Pécsi VSE (I/B)
ETO-SZESE Győr (I/B)	28–13	Tatai AC (I/B)
Nyíregyházi KC (I/B)	37–32	ÓAM-Ózdi KC (I/B)
Pénzügyőr SE (I/B)	25–30	Vecsés SE (I/B)
Kalocsai KC (II)	23–26	Székács KE (I/B)
KK Ajka (II)	20–22	Veszprémi KSE (I/B)
Hajdúböszörményi TE (II)	18–27	Tiszavasvári SE-Quick2000 (I/B)

=== Round II ===
The first round ties are scheduled for 3 – 11 October 2016.

Team 1	Score	Team 2
3 October
Tiszavasvári SE-Quick2000 (I/B)	25–28	Eger SBS Eszterházy (I)
4 October
Ferencvárosi TC (I/B)	32–21	ETO-SZESE Győr (I/B)
Békés-Drén KC (I/B)	29–30	Ceglédi KKSE (I)
Nyíregyházi KC (I/B)	22–26	B. Braun Gyöngyös (I)
Budai Farkasok KK (Count. I)	23–38	Százhalombattai KE (I/B)
Balassagyarmati Kábel SE (I/B)	18–39	CYEB Budakalász (I)
Székács KE (I/B)	19–26	Orosházi FKSE- LINAMAR (I)
Veszprémi KSE (I/B)	24–28	Sport36-Komló (I)
5 October
Pécsi VSE (I/B)	29–33	Alba-MÁV Előre (I/B)
Törökszentmiklósi KE (I/B)	32–18	Mizse KC (I/B)
Vecsés SE (I/B)	26–25	PLER-Budapest (I/B)
11 October
Balmazújvárosi KK (I)	28–33	Mezőkövesdi KC (I)

=== Round III ===
The first round ties are scheduled for 25 – 26 October 2016.

Team 1	Score	Team 2
25 October
Százhalombattai KE (I/B)	28–37	Csurgói KK (I)
Ferencvárosi TC (I/B)	29–28	CYEB Budakalász (I)
Alba-MÁV Előre (I/B)	25–27	Sport36-Komló (I)
Grundfos Tatabánya KC (I)	27–14	Orosházi FKSE- LINAMAR (I)
Törökszentmiklósi KE (I/B)	22–32	Ceglédi KKSE (I)
26 October
Eger SBS Eszterházy (I)	24–31	Mezőkövesdi KC (I)
Váci KSE (I)	25–20	B. Braun Gyöngyös (I)
Vecsés SE (I/B)	27–28	Balatonfüredi KSE (I)

=== Round IV ===
The first round ties are scheduled for 2 – 7 February 2017.

Team 1	Score	Team 2
2 February
Mezőkövesdi KC (I)	29–33	Grundfos Tatabánya KC (I)
4 February
Balatonfüredi KSE (I)	24–19	Sport36-Komló (I)
Ferencvárosi TC (I/B)	34–31	Váci KSE (I)
7 February
Ceglédi KKSE (I)	24–24 (a)	Csurgói KK (I)

=== Round V ===
The quarterfinals (Round V) ties are scheduled for 16 March 2017.

Team 1	Score	Team 2
16 March
Ferencvárosi TC (I/B)	19–24	Grundfos Tatabánya KC (I)
Csurgói KK (I)	26–22	Balatonfüredi KSE (I)

== Final four ==
The final four will be held on 14–15 April 2017 at the Főnix Hall in Debrecen.

Semi-finals
14 April, 14:45
Telekom Veszprém	33
Csurgói KK	23
14 April, 17:15
MOL-Pick Szeged	28
Grundfos Tatabánya KC	20

Final
15 April, 14:15
Telekom Veszprém	23
MOL-Pick Szeged	22
Bronze medal match
15 April, 11:45
Csurgói KK	18
Grundfos Tatabánya KC	23

=== Awards ===
- Most valuable player: (Slovenia) Gašper Marguč (Telekom Veszprém)
- Best Goalkeeper: (Spain) José Manuel Sierra (MOL-Pick Szeged)

=== Semi-finals ===
14 April 2017; 14:45 (CEST)	Telekom Veszprém	33 – 23	Csurgói KK	Főnix csarnok, Debrecen; Attendance: 1,700; Referees: Bonifert, Oláh
14 April 2017; 14:45 (CEST)	Blagotinšek 8	(16–14)	Astrashapkin 7	Főnix csarnok, Debrecen; Attendance: 1,700; Referees: Bonifert, Oláh
14 April 2017; 14:45 (CEST)	2× (yellow card) 3× (suspension)	Report	3× (yellow card) 1× (suspension)	Főnix csarnok, Debrecen; Attendance: 1,700; Referees: Bonifert, Oláh

14 April 2017; 17:15 (CEST)	MOL-Pick Szeged	28 – 20	Grundfos Tatabánya KC	Főnix csarnok, Debrecen; Attendance: 2,000; Referees: Horváth, Marton
14 April 2017; 17:15 (CEST)	Balogh 8	(16–10)	Rosta 6	Főnix csarnok, Debrecen; Attendance: 2,000; Referees: Horváth, Marton
14 April 2017; 17:15 (CEST)	2× (yellow card) 4× (suspension)	Report	3× (yellow card) 1× (suspension)	Főnix csarnok, Debrecen; Attendance: 2,000; Referees: Horváth, Marton

=== Bronze medal match ===
15 April 2017; 11:45 (CEST)	Csurgói KK	18 – 23	Grundfos Tatabánya KC	Főnix csarnok, Debrecen; Attendance: 2,500; Referees: Bacs, Bóna
15 April 2017; 11:45 (CEST)	Oslak 5	(9–10)	Szöllősi 8	Főnix csarnok, Debrecen; Attendance: 2,500; Referees: Bacs, Bóna
15 April 2017; 11:45 (CEST)	3× (yellow card) 5× (suspension)	Report	3× (yellow card) 6× (suspension)	Főnix csarnok, Debrecen; Attendance: 2,500; Referees: Bacs, Bóna

=== Final ===
15 April 2017; 14:15 (CEST)	Telekom Veszprém	23 – 22	MOL-Pick Szeged	Főnix csarnok, Debrecen; Attendance: 4,500; Referees: Herczeg, Südi
15 April 2017; 14:15 (CEST)	Marguč 7	(13–9)	Balogh 8	Főnix csarnok, Debrecen; Attendance: 4,500; Referees: Herczeg, Südi
15 April 2017; 14:15 (CEST)	3× (yellow card) 6× (suspension)	Report	3× (yellow card) 5× (suspension) 1× (red card)	Főnix csarnok, Debrecen; Attendance: 4,500; Referees: Herczeg, Südi

2016–17 Magyar Kupa
Winner

Telekom Veszprém
26th title

Mikler, Alilović (goalkeepers), Ancsin, Ilić, Iváncsik, Lékai, Marguč, Nagy (c),
Nilsson, Pálmarsson, Schuch, Sulić, Terzić, Ugalde (Chema Rodríguez, Gajić)
Head coach
Xavi Sabaté

==== Final standings ====
	Team
	Telekom Veszprém
Silver medal	MOL-Pick Szeged
Bronze medal	Grundfos Tatabánya KC
	Csurgói KK

== See also ==
- 2016–17 Nemzeti Bajnokság I
- 2016–17 Nemzeti Bajnokság I/B
- 2016–17 Nemzeti Bajnokság II
