= Vladimir Golovin =

Hungarian handball player and coach (born 1970)

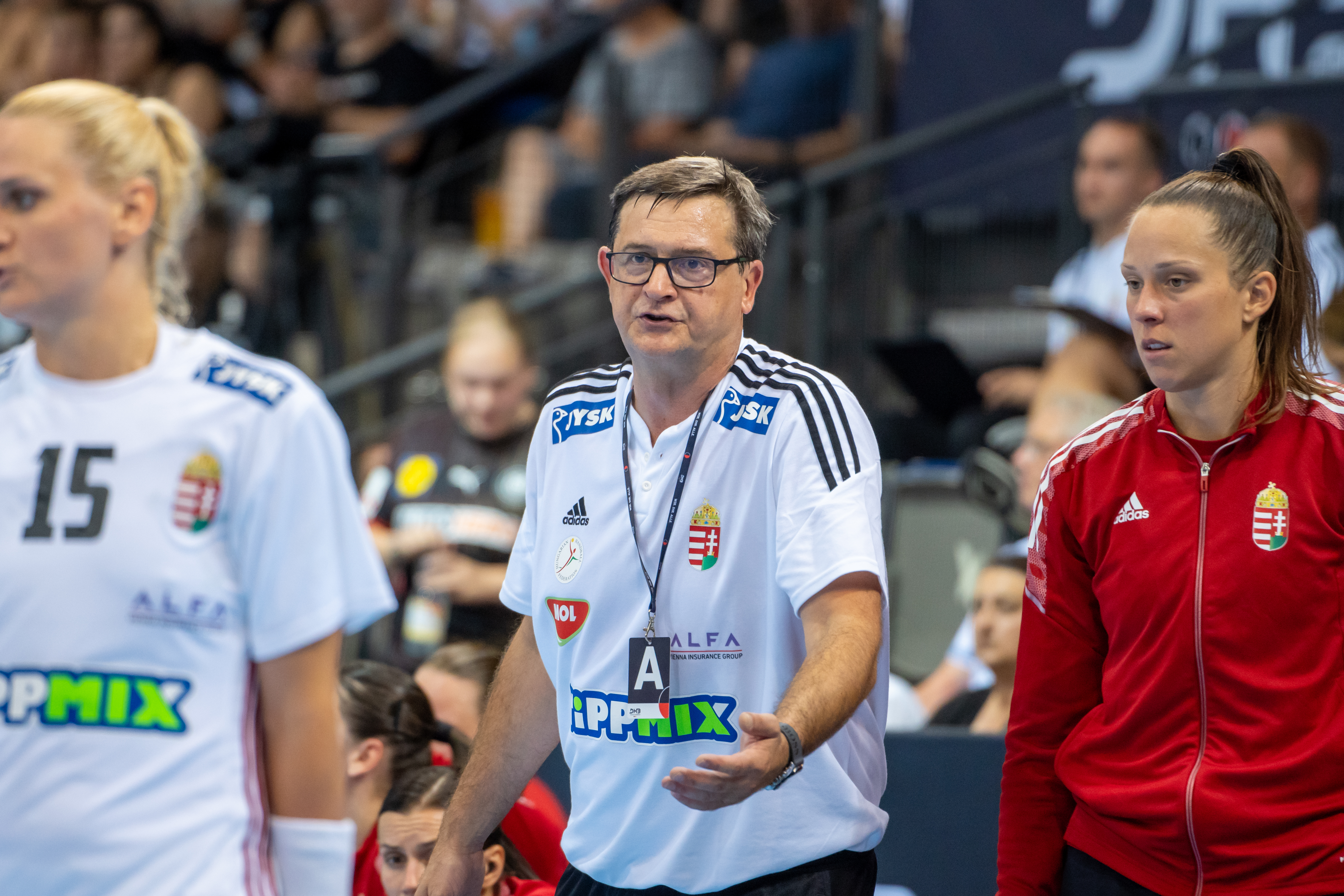

Personal information
- Nationality: Ukrainian/Hungarian
- Born: March 21, 1970 (age 56) Odesa, Soviet Union

Sport
- Sport: Handball
- Current club: Hungary women

Senior clubs
- Years: Team
- 1983-1992: HC Odessa
- 1992-1996: Szolnoki KC
- 1996-1998: KSK Kiskőrös
- 1998-2000: Százhalombattai KE
- 2000-2005: Hargitai KC
- 2005-2006: Dabasi KC

Teams managed
- 2010–2011: Százhalombattai KE
- 2011: Kispest SE
- 2011–2012: Bugyi SE
- 2012–2013: Kiskunhalas NKSE
- 2013–2015: Siófok KC
- 2015–2021: MTK Budapest
- 2018–2021: Hungary W junior
- 2021–: Hungary women
Medal record
European Championship
Bronze medal – third place	2024 Austria/Hungary/Switzerland

Vladimir Golovin (Hungarian: Golovin Vlagyimir; born 21 March 1970) is a former handball player and the current head coach of the Hungarian women's national team.

Born in Odessa, Soviet Union, Golovin moved to Hungary in 1992 and since then obtained the Hungarian citizenship. In Hungary he played for Szolnoki KC, Kiskőrös KSK, Százhalombattai KE, Hargita KC and in his final years for Dabasi KC.

== Coaching career ==
His coaching career began at the men's team of Százhalombatta, subsequently he coached women's teams, including Kispesti NKK, Bugyi SE and Ferencvárosi TC. Initially a youth coach in Ferencváros, he soon was promoted to assistant coach and was part of the back-to-back EHF Cup Winners' Cup winner team in 2011 and 2012. During this period he also acted as the assistant coach of the Hungarian women's junior national team that won the bronze medal at the 2012 Women's Junior World Handball Championship.

In 2012 he took the head coach position at Kiskunhalasi NKSE and under his management the team produced one of the surprise performances in the 2012–13 season. At the end of the season he was signed by Siófok KC to replace Szilárd Kiss, who became the youth director of the club. Between April 2015 and November 2021 he was the head coach of MTK Budapest.

In March 2018 he took over the head coach position at Hungary women's national junior handball team from János Hajdu. With his lead the team won the 2018 Junior World Handball Championship, which was the very first title of the Hungarian national junior team. One year later, the team won the Junior European Championship.

Since 2021 he serves as the head coach of the Hungarian women's national team. His achievements as head coach include 10th place at the 2021 and the 2023 World Championship, 11th place at the 2022 and bronze medal at the 2024 European Championship, and 6th place at the 2024 Summer Olympics. The bronze medal at the 2024 European Championship was the first Hungarian medals since 2012.

== Privat life ==
His wife is the former goalkeeper Elena Abramovich.

== Achievements ==
Coach

- European Women's Handball Championship:
  - Bronze: 2024
- IHF Women's Junior World Championship:
  - Gold: 2018
- European Women's U-19 Handball Championship:
  - Gold: 2019
