= Budai Farkasok KKUK =

Hungarian handball club

- Full name: Budai Farkasok Kézilabda Klub és Utánpótlásnevelő Központ
- Nickname: Farkasok
- Short name: Budai Farkasok
- Founded: 2010; 16 years ago
- Arena: Budaörs Városi Uszoda Sportcsarnok és Strand (BVUSS), Budaörs
- Capacity: 1,000
- Head coach: Szilárd Kiss
- League: Nemzeti Bajnokság I
- Club colours
Home	Away

Budai Farkasok KKUK is a Hungarian team handball club from Buda, that plays in the Nemzeti Bajnokság I.

Location of Budai Farkasok

== Crest, colours, supporters ==
=== Kits ===
HOME
2020–21	2021–22	2022–23

AWAY
2019–21	2021–22	2022–23

THIRD

2022–23

== Sports hall information ==
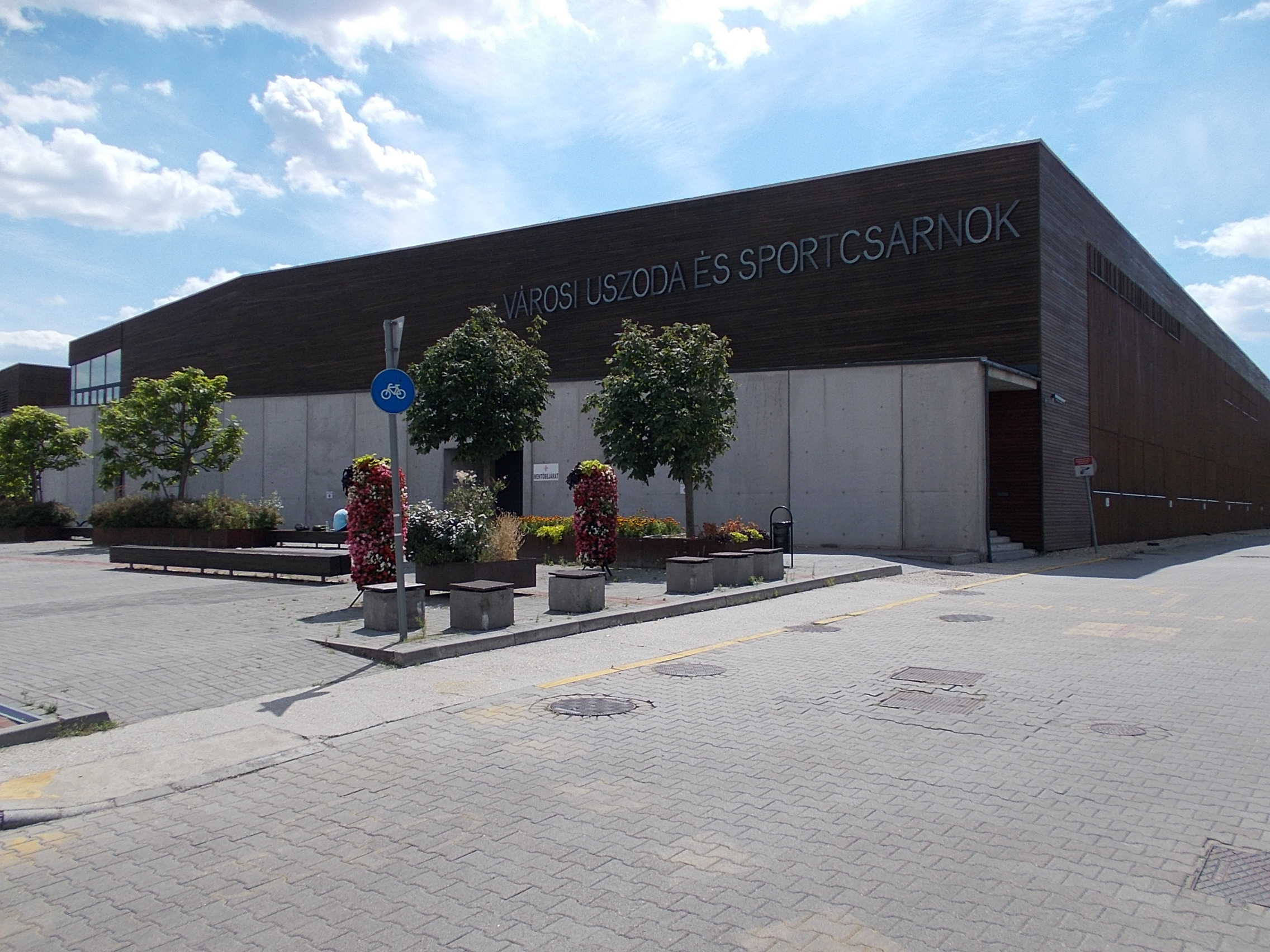
Home hall: Budaörs Városi Uszoda Sportcsarnok és Strand (BVUSS)

- Name: – Budaörs Városi Uszoda Sportcsarnok és Strand (BVUSS)
- City: – Budaörs
- Capacity: – 1000
- Address: – 2040 Budaörs, Hársfa u. 6.

== Management ==
Position	Name
Founder and Professional Manager	(Hungary) Gyula Zsiga
Founder and Managing director	(Hungary) Mihály Bődy

== Team ==
=== Current squad ===
Squad for the 2025–26 season

Budai Farkasok – Rév Group

Goalkeepers

- 1 (Hungary) Tibor Balogh
- 61 (Hungary) Norman Tóth
- 67 (Slovakia) Marián Žernovič

Left Wingers

- 5 (Egypt) Khaled Essam
- 23 (Hungary) Balázs Pintér

Right Wingers

- 28 (Hungary) Hunor Csengeri
- 71 (Hungary) Ákos Hutvágner

Line Players

- 3 (Hungary) László Szeitl
- 33 (Croatia) Marino Marić
- 37 (Hungary) Géza Bodnár

Central Backs

- 7 (Hungary) Ádám Juhász (c)
- 30 (Hungary) Mátyás Kristóf

Left Backs

- 10 (Greece) Theodoros Boskos
- 18 (Hungary) Zsombor Bene
- 81 (Hungary) Ákos Bendicsek
- 92 (Hungary) Gellért Draskovics

Right Backs

- 8 (Bosnia and Herzegovina) Marko Panić
- 11 (Hungary) Dávid Horváth
- (Hungary) Benjámin Sinkovits

=== Technical staff ===
- Head coach: (Hungary) Szilárd Kiss
- Goalkeeping coach: (Hungary) István Dányi
- Fitness coach: (Hungary) Örs Sebestyén
- Athletic coach: (Hungary) Levente Csillag
- Masseur: (Hungary) László Kivés
- Physiotherapist: (Hungary) Alexandra Kuszi
- Club doctor: (Hungary) Dr. Gergő Zelenák

=== Transfers ===
Transfers for the 2026–27 season

Joining

- (Sweden) Herman Josefsson (LP) from (Sweden) IFK Kristianstad
- (Hungary) (Ukraine) Viktor Melnicsuk (CB) from (Hungary) Balatonfüredi KSE
- (Hungary) Viktor Prainer (LB) from (Hungary) Ferencvárosi TC

Leaving

- (Greece) Theodoros Boskos (LB) to (Romania) SCM Politehnica Timișoara
- (Hungary) Géza Bodnár (LP) to (Hungary) Ferencvárosi TC

=== Transfer History ===
Transfers for the 2025–26 season

Joining

- (Croatia) Marino Marić (LP) from (Croatia) MRK Sesvete
- (Bosnia and Herzegovina) Marko Panić (RB) from (Poland) Wisła Płock
- (Greece) Theodoros Boskos (LB) from (Spain) Bidasoa Irún
- (Slovakia) Marián Žernovič (GK) from (Slovakia) MŠK Považská Bystrica
- (Hungary) Ádám Juhász (CB) from (Hungary) Budakalász FKC
- (Hungary) Benjámin Sinkovits (RB) from (Hungary) Budakalász FKC

Leaving

- (Hungary) Dávid Fekete (LW)
- (Hungary) Gergő Spekhardt (LP) to (Hungary) QHB-Eger
- (Hungary) Dávid Szabad (GK) to (Hungary) QHB-Eger
- (Hungary) Csongor Csányi (LB)
- (Hungary) Péter Kende (CB) to (Spain) OAR BM Coruña
- (Hungary) Milán Puskás (CB) to (Hungary) Ferencvárosi TC U21
- (Hungary) Krisztián Lakatos (GK)
- (Croatia) Matej Vuleta (CB) on loan at (Hungary) Budakalász FKC
- (Hungary) Áron Kovács (RB) on loan at (Hungary) Budakalász FKC

Transfers for the 2024–25 season

Joining

- (Egypt) Khaled Essam (LW) from (Hungary) Fejér B.Á.L. Veszprém
- (Hungary) Tibor Balogh (GK) from (Hungary) Fejér B.Á.L. Veszprém
- (Hungary) Mátyás Kristóf (CB) from (Hungary) Fejér B.Á.L. Veszprém
- (Hungary) Gellért Draskovics (LB) from (Hungary) Balatonfüredi KSE
- (Hungary) Zsombor Bene (LB) from (Hungary) BFKA-Veszprém
- (Hungary) Gergő Spekhardt (LP) from (Hungary) Ceglédi KKSE

Leaving

- (Hungary) Krisztián Rédai (LB) (retires)
- (Hungary) Dávid Horváth (RB) to (Hungary) Százhalombattai KE
- (Hungary) Szabolcs Szövérdffy (LB) to (Hungary) Százhalombattai KE
- (Hungary) Christopher Auer (LP) to (Hungary) Komárom VSE
- (Hungary) Krisztián Lakatos (GK) on loan at (Hungary) Komárom VSE
- (Hungary) Csongor Csányi (LB) on loan at (Hungary) Csömör KSK
- (Hungary) Milán Puskás (CB) on loan at (Hungary) Csömör KSK
- (Hungary) Krisztián Weiler (LW) to (Hungary) Csömör KSK
- (Hungary) Bence Nagy-Jávori (CB) to (Hungary) Vecsés SE

Transfers for the 2023–24 season

Joining

- (Hungary) Dávid Fekete (LW) from (Hungary) Százhalombattai KE
- (Hungary) László Szeitl (LP) from (Hungary) Csurgói KK
- (Hungary) Máté Tősér (LB) from (Hungary) BFKA-Balatonfüred
- (Hungary) Péter Kende (CB) from (Hungary) Ceglédi KKSE

Leaving

- (Algeria) Abdeldjalil Zennadi (LP) to (Hungary) QHB-Eger
- (Japan) Yuga Enomoto (RB) to (Hungary) MOL Tatabánya KC
- (Egypt) Khaled Essam (LW) to (Hungary) Fejér B.Á.L. Veszprém
- (United States) (Hungary) Pál Merkovszki (GK) to (Hungary) Sport36-Komló
- (Croatia) Tomislav Kvastek (LP)
- (Hungary) Ákos Széles (RB) to (Romania) CSM București
- (Hungary) Alex Németh (CB) to (Italy) Albatro Siracusa
- (Hungary) Szabolcs Nagy (LB) to (Hungary) Szigetszentmiklósi KSK
- (Hungary) Bence Holdosi (LW) to (Hungary) PLER-Budapest
- (Hungary) Félix Turák (LP) loan back to (Hungary) Ferencvárosi TC
- (Hungary) Péter Valler (RW)
- (Hungary) Mohamed Yassine Benmiloud (LP)
- (Hungary) Lajos Nánási (GK) to (Hungary) Rákosmenti KSK
- (Hungary) Zsombor Oldal (RW) to (Hungary) Komárom VSE

Transfers for the 2022–23 season

Joining

- (Croatia) Tomislav Kvastek (LP) from (Croatia) RK Zamet
- (Croatia) Matej Vuleta (CB) from (Croatia) RK Bjelovar
- (Japan) Yuga Enomoto (RB) from (Hungary) Kecskeméti TE
- (Hungary) (United States) Pál Merkovszki (GK) from (Hungary) Gyöngyösi KK
- (Hungary) Lajos Nánási (GK) from (Hungary) BFKA-Veszprém
- (Hungary) Félix Turák (LP) on loan from (Hungary) Ferencvárosi TC
- (Hungary) Ákos Széles (RB) from (Hungary) Fejér B.Á.L. Veszprém
- (Algeria) Abdeldjalil Zennadi (LP) from (Algeria) MC Alger

Leaving

- (Hungary) Ádám Korsós (CB) (retires)
- (Hungary) Balázs Boros (RB) to (Hungary) PLER KC
- (Hungary) Kristóf Bende (GK)

== Previous squads ==
2021–2022 Team
Shirt No	Nationality	Player	Birth Date	Position
9	Hungary	Christopher Auer	1 May 1995 (age 31)	Line Player
10	Hungary	Tamás Kecskeméti	16 February 1998 (age 28)	Right Winger
13	Hungary	Mohamed Yassine Benmiloud	4 March 1990 (age 36)	Line Player
14	Hungary	Tamás Oláh	14 February 1993 (age 33)	Right Back
15	Egypt	Khaled Essam	1 June 1998 (age 28)	Left Winger
16	Hungary	Bálint Torma	5 June 2002 (age 24)	Goalkeeper
17	Hungary	Péter Valler	17 September 1996 (age 29)	Right Winger
18	Hungary	Ádám Korsós	28 April 1988 (age 38)	Central Back
20	Hungary	Balázs Boros	2 August 1999 (age 27)	Right Back
22	Hungary	Alex Németh	18 September 1998 (age 27)	Central Back
24	Hungary	Szabolcs Szövérdffy	9 January 1995 (age 31)	Left Back
25	Hungary	Kristóf Bende	25 June 1995 (age 31)	Goalkeeper
30	Hungary	Milán Puskás	28 September 2004 (age 21)	Central Back
31	Hungary	Bertalan Papp	9 February 2002 (age 24)	Left Winger
37	Hungary	Bence Holdosi	17 December 2000 (age 25)	Left Winger
42	Hungary	Krisztián Rédai	29 July 1995 (age 31)	Left Back
61	Hungary	Norman Tóth	8 March 1989 (age 37)	Goalkeeper
81	Hungary	Botond Schultheisz	28 September 2001 (age 24)	Line Player
95	Hungary	Szabolcs Nagy	24 November 1995 (age 30)	Left Back
96	Hungary	Kerim Khalil	27 June 2000 (age 26)	Line Player

== Top Scorers ==
Season	Player	Apps/Goals
2021–2022	(Egypt) Khaled Essam	27/146
2022–2023	(Japan) Yuga Enomoto	26/133
2023–2024	(Hungary) Áron Kovács	30/149
2024–2025	(Hungary) Hunor Csengeri	29/123

== Honours ==
Honours		No.	Years
League
Nemzeti Bajnokság I/B	Winners	1	2021–22

== Season to season ==
As of 07/07/2025

- Seasons in Nemzeti Bajnokság I: 1
- Seasons in Nemzeti Bajnokság I/B: 4

Season	Tier	Division	Place	Magyar Kupa
2012–13	4	MB I Pest	10th	
2013–14	4	MB I Pest	7th	
2014–15	4	MB I Pest	7th	
2015–16	4	MB I Pest	6th	
2016–17	4	MB I Pest	1st	
2017–18	3	NB II Dél	1st	Round 1
2018–19	2	NB I/B Nyugat	8th	Round 2
2019–20	1	NB I/B Nyugat	Cancelled due COVID-19	
2020–21	2	NB I/B Nyugat	5th	
2021–22	2	NB I/B Nyugat	1st	Round 3
2022–23	1	NB I	14th	Round 4
2023–24	2	NB I/B	8th	
2024–25	2	NB I/B	2nd	Round 4
2025–26	1	NB I		

== Former club members ==
=== Notable former players ===
The list includes players who have played at least once for their national team or spent at least 10 years with the team.

==== Goalkeepers ====
- (Hungary) (United States) Pál Merkovszki (2018–2019, 2022–2023)
- (Slovakia) Marián Žernovič (2025–)

==== Right wingers ====
- (Dominican Republic) Mateo Dioris (2017–2018)

==== Left wingers ====
- (Hungary) Dávid Fekete (2023–2025)
- (Hungary) Gábor Pálos (2019–2020)

==== Line players ====
- (Algeria) Abdeldjalil Zennadi (2023)
- (Croatia) Marino Marić (2025–)

==== Central backs ====
- (Hungary) Ádám Juhász (2025–)

==== Left backs ====
- (Greece) Theodoros Boskos (2025–2026)

==== Right backs ====
- (Bosnia and Herzegovina) Marko Panić (2025–)
- (Japan) Yuga Enomoto (2022–2023)

=== Former coaches ===
Seasons	Coach	Country
2018–2023	Endre Koi	(Hungary)
2023–	Ádám Korsós	(Hungary)
