= CSIKO SE Orosháza =

Hungarian handball club

CSIKO SE Orosháza (Hungary)
- Full name: CSIKO-Boat Sport Egyesület Orosháza
- Short name: CSIKO SE
- Founded: 2022; 3 years ago
- Arena: Eötvös Sportcsarnok, Orosháza
- Capacity: 740 seats
- Head coach: Attila Kovács
- League: Nemzeti Bajnokság II
Home	Away

CSIKO SE Orosháza is a Hungarian handball club from Orosháza.

Location of CSIKO SE Orosháza

== History ==
In 2004, Dr. Csaba Csiki, his brother and three friends formed the CSIKO-BOAT sports association because of the opportunity to compete in sailing competitions. The name of the association was put together from the letters of the names of the founding members: Csi-Ko-Bo-At. After sailing racing stopped, the association went dormant for a few years. The club was revived in 2015 through the Aerobic Department. In July 2022, the Orosházi FKSE announced that due to a lack of financial support, it would not be able to start its adult men's handball team in the 2022-2023 season of the NB I/B. A month after the announcement, a handball division will be launched in the CSIKO-BOAT SE aerobics club in Orosháza in order to save the adult men's division. The new team started as CSIKO SE Orosháza in the county championship in the 2022-2023 season, in the Hungarian 4th division.

== Crest, colours, supporters ==
=== Naming history ===
Name	Period
CSIKO SE Orosháza	2022–present

=== Kit manufacturers and Shirt sponsor ===
The following table shows in detail CSIKO SE Orosháza kit manufacturers and shirt sponsors by year:

Kit manufacturers

Period	Kit manufacturer
2022–2023	(Germany) Puma
2023–present	(Germany) Erima

Shirt sponsor

Period	Sponsor
2022 - 2023	Consulting Könyvelőiroda / Orosfarm Zrt.
2023–present	Consulting Könyvelőiroda / Orosfarm Zrt. / Oros-Sport Kft.

=== Kits ===
HOME
2022-23

AWAY

2023–24

== Sports Hall information ==
- Name: – Eötvös Sportcsarnok
- City: – Orosháza
- Capacity: – 740
- Address: – 5900 Orosháza, Eötvös tér 2.

== Management ==
Position	Name
President	(Hungary) dr. Csaba Csiki

== Team ==
=== Current squad ===
Squad for the 2022–23 season

CSIKO SE Orosháza

Goalkeepers

- 1 (Hungary) Levente Paulik
- 11 (Hungary) Tibor Kovács
- 12 (Hungary) László Pajkó

Left Wingers

- 7 (Hungary) Szabolcs Lászlai
- 44 (Hungary) László Németh

Right Wingers

- 9 (Hungary) Máté Pásztor
- 35 (Hungary) Sándor Farkas

Line Players

- (Hungary) Marcell Nadicsán
- 33 (Hungary) Tibor Boldizsár Simon
- 77 (Hungary) Szabolcs Antal

Central Backs

- 13 (Hungary) Richárd Rékasi
- 19 (Hungary) Levente Borbély

Left Backs

- 30 (Hungary) Balázs Fábián

Right Backs

=== Technical staff ===
- Head Coach: (Hungary) Attila Kovács

== Recent seasons ==
As of 19/06/2022

- Seasons in Nemzeti Bajnokság II: 1

Season	Division	Pos.	Magyar kupa
2022–23	County I	1st	
2023–24	NB II Délkelet		

== Former club members ==
=== Notable former players ===
- (Hungary) László Németh (2022–)

=== Former coaches ===
Seasons	Coach	Country
2022–2023	László Németh	(Hungary)
2023–	Ádám Héjja	(Hungary)
