= Ivan Perišić (handballer) =

Montenegrin handball player (born 1990)

Personal information
- Nationality: Montenegrin
- Born: 14 April 1990 (age 36) Cetinje, Montenegro
- Height: 1.90 m (6 ft 3 in)

Sport
- Sport: Handball
- Position: Right back
National team
Years	Team	Apps	(Gls)
–	Montenegro	10	(5)

Ivan Perišić (born 14 April 1990) is a Montenegrin handball player who plays for RK Lovćen.

In 2021, he became the third Monetenegrin player to score over 1000 goals.
