= Ádám Országh =

Hungarian handball player (born 1989)

Personal information
- Nationality: Hungarian
- Born: 6 October 1989 (age 37) Szeged, Hungary
- Height: 1.83 m (6 ft 0 in)

Sport
- Sport: Handball
- Position: Right wing
- Current club: Dabas VSE KC
- Number: 23
National team
Years	Team	Apps	(Gls)
–	Hungary	2	(1)

Ádám Országh (born 6 October 1989) is a Hungarian handball player for Dabas VSE KC and the Hungarian national team.

He participated at the 2018 European Men's Handball Championship.
