= Nemzeti Bajnokság I/B (men's handball) =

- Founded: 1968
- No. of teams: 16
- Country: Hungary
- Confederation: EHF
- Promotion to: Nemzeti Bajnokság I
- Relegation to: Nemzeti Bajnokság II
- Website: Kézilada eredmények

The Nemzeti Bajnokság I/B (English: National Championship I/B) is the second-tier league for Hungarian men's handball clubs. It is administered by the Hungarian Handball Federation. The top two placed teams are promoted to the NB I for the next season.

== Current season ==
=== Teams for season 2023–24 ===
Location of teams in 2023–24 Nemzeti Bajnokság I/B

Team	Location	Arena	Capacity
BFKA-Veszprém	Veszprém	Veszprém Aréna	5096
Békési FKC	Békés	Városi Sportcsarnok	800
Budai Farkasok KKUK	Budaörs	Budaörs Városi Uszoda Sportcsarnok és Strand	1000
Ceglédi KKSE	Cegléd	Gál József Sportcsarnok	1000
Debreceni EAC	Debrecen	DESOK csarnok	400
Győri ETO-UNI FKC	Győr	Magvassy Mihály Sportcsarnok	2800
Kecskeméti TE	Kecskemét	Messzi István Sportcsarnok	1200
KK Ajka	Ajka	Városi Szabadidő- és Sportcentrum	
Mezőkövesdi KC	Mezőkövesd	Városi Sportcsarnok	850
Ózdi KC	Ózd	Városi Sportcsarnok	1000
OTP Bank - Pick Szeged U21	Szeged	Pick Aréna Ludányi Márton Sportcsarnoka	1500
Rákosmenti KSK	Budapest, XVII. ker	Riz Levente Sport- és Rendezvényközpont	1500
Szigetszentmiklósi KSK	Szigetszentmiklós	SZKSK Kézilabda Csarnok	350
Tatai AC	Tata	Güntner Aréna Városi Sportcsarnok	500
Vecsés SE	Vecsés	Városi Sportcsarnok	
Fejér B.Á.L. Veszprém U21	Veszprém	Március 15. úti Sportcsarnok	2200

== Champions by year ==
Season	Western champion	Eastern champion
1968	Tatabányai Bányász	
1969	Honvéd Szondy SE	
1970	Ferencvárosi TC	
1971	Ózdi Kohász	
1972	Győri Textiles	
1973	Vörös Meteor Egyetértés	
1974	Csepel SC	
1975	Szegedi Volán	
1976	Csepel SC	
1977	Szilasmenti TSZ SK	
1978	Újpesti Dózsa	
1979	Ózdi Kohász	
1980	Veszprémi Építők	
1981	Várpalotai Bányász	
1982	DÉLÉP SC	
1983	Dunaújvárosi Kohász SE	
1984	DÉLÉP SC	
1985	Dunaújvárosi Kohász SE	
1986	PEMÜ SE	
1987	Dunaújvárosi Kohász SE	
1988	Alföldi Olajbányász SE	
1989–90	Komlói Bányász	
1990–91	III. ker. TTVE	Ózdi Kohász
1991–92	Tungsram Nagykanizsa	Biokontakt Cegléd
1992–93	Tatabányai SC	Hort SE
1993–94	Százhalombattai KE	Törökszentmiklósi SE
1994–95	Dunaferr SE	Agrokontakt SE Cegléd
1995–96	Honvéd Szondi SE	Ózdi KC
1996–97	Százhalombattai VSE-MOL	Alkaloida SE
1997–98	Tatabánya-Tatai Cserép KC	Kiskőrös-Kalocsa KC
1998–99	Pestszentlőrinc SC	ICN Alkaloida SE
1999–00	Komlói Bányász SK	Tiszaföldvári VSE
2000–01	Rév TSC	Every Day KSE Orosháza
2001–02	Tatabánya-Tatai Cserép KC	Békési FKC
2002–03	Szigetvári TK SE	Szabolcs KSE
2003–04	Hargita KC	Debreceni KSE
2004–05	Komlói BSK-Fűtőerőmű	Békési FKC
2005–06	Százhalombattai KE	Gyöngyösi KK
2006–07	Tatai HAC	Hort SE-FTC
2007–08	Csurgói KK	Delfin KC
2008–09	Uniqa-Pécsi VSE	FTC-Cityline
2009–10	Uniqa-Pécsi VSE	Orosházi FKSE
2010–11	Tatai HAC	Gyöngyösi KK
2011–12	IPG Hungary-Váci KSE-Taxi 2000	Ceglédi KKSE
2012–13	SZESE Győr	Mezőkövesdi KC
2013–14	MKB-MVM Veszprém II	Balmazújvárosi KK
2014–15	Váci KSE	SBS-Eger
2015–16	Budakalász FKC	FKSE Algyő
2016–17	Dabas KC VSE	Ferencvárosi TC
2017–18	Vecsés SE	Mezőkövesdi KC
2018–19	Váci KSE	Orosházi FKSE
2019–20	Veszprém KKFT Felsőörs	Ceglédi KKSE
2020–21	NEKA	Kecskeméti TE
2021–22	Budai Farkasok KKUK, Ceglédi KKSE	
2022–23	QHB-Eger, PLER-Budapest	
