= Nemzeti Bajnokság II (men's handball) =

Hungarian sports league

- Sport: Handball
- Founded: 1968
- No. of teams: 64 (8 teams in 8 groups)
- Country: Hungary
- Confederation: EHF
- Level on pyramid: 3
- Promotion to: Nemzeti Bajnokság I/B
- Relegation to: Megyei Bajnokság
- Website: Kézilada eredmények

The Nemzeti Bajnokság II (English: National Championship II) is the third division championship of Hungarian men's handball clubs. It is administered by the Hungarian Handball Federation. The tier contains 8 groups (Group A, Group B, Group C, Group D, Group E, Group F, Group G and Group H) of 64 teams. The teams are in the groups based on territorial principles. In the regular season, in all 8 groups, with the right to choose the pitch, they play in a round-robin system on a round-robin basis 7+7, i.e. a total of 14 matches. At the end of the basic season, 2 groups are combined: group A with group B, group C with group D, group E with group F, group G with group H. Groups will have lower and upper houses. The 2 combined groups are 1-4. placed in the upper house, the 5-8. the runner-up will continue to play in the Lower House play-off. The winner of the 4-4 upper house playoff earns the right to start in the Nemzeti Bajnokság I/B. The 4-4 lower house playoff is 6-8. places are relegated to the Megyei Bajnokság.

== Current season ==
=== Teams for season 2023–24 ===
==== Group A ====
- Alsóörsi SE
- BFKA-Balatonfüred
- Komárom VSE
- Tarján SE
- Lipót Pékség
- Szentgotthárdi VSE
- Győri ETO-UNI FKC U21
- Várpalotai BSK

==== Group B ====
- Budakalászi SC 1995
- Budapesti Honvéd SE
- BVSC-Zugló
- Máv Előre-Cunder Kézisuli
- Ferencvárosi TC U21
- Kistext SE
- TFSE
- VS Dunakeszi

==== Group C ====
- Acélváros KK
- Diósgyőri VTK
- Füzesabonyi SC
- Gödöllői KSE
- Csépe Salgótarjáni SKC
- Szinvaparti KSE Miskolc
- Váci FKA
- Veresegyház VSK

==== Group D ====
- ASK Hajdúszoboszló
- Balmazújvárosi KK
- Debreceni EAC II.
- Hajdúböszörményi TE
- Hajdúnánás SK
- Kisvárdai KC
- Nyírbátor SC
- Tiszavasvári SE

==== Group E ====
- Tungsram SE Nagykanizsa
- Hőgyészi SC
- NEKA U21
- Mecseknádasdi Spartacus SE
- MK Pelikán Siklós KC
- Pécsi EAC
- Pécsi VSE
- Rinyamenti KC

==== Group F ====
- Budai Farkasok KKUK U21
- Csepel DSE
- Dunaharaszti MTK
- Kalocsai KC
- Százhalombattai KE
- Érdi FKSE
- MAFC
- VSK Tököl

==== Group G ====
- Csömör KSK
- Dabas KK U21
- Mizse KC
- PLER-Budapest U21
- Szolnoki KCSE
- Törökszentmiklósi Székács KE
- Túrkevei VSE
- Üllői KSE

==== Group H ====
- Berettyó MSE
- Békési FKC U21
- CSIKO SE Orosháza
- FISE Újkígyós
- Kondorosi KK
- Makói KC
- Mezőtúri AFC
- OTP Bank - Pick Szeged III.
