= Ózdi KC =

Hungarian handball club

ÓAM-Ózdi KC
- Full name: Ózdi Kézilabda Club
- Short name: ÓKC
- Founded: 1993
- Arena: Marosi István Városi Sportcsarnok, Ózd
- Capacity: 1,000
- Head coach: György Szakál
- League: NB I/B
- Club colours
Home	Away

Ózdi Kézilabda Club is a Hungarian handball club from Ózd, that plays in the Nemzeti Bajnokság I/B, the second level championship in Hungary.

Location of Ózdi KC

== Naming history ==
- 1993–2015: Ózdi KC
- 2015–present: ÓAM-Ózdi KC

== Kits ==
HOME
2018–19	2021–22

AWAY
2018–19	2021–

== Sports Hall information ==
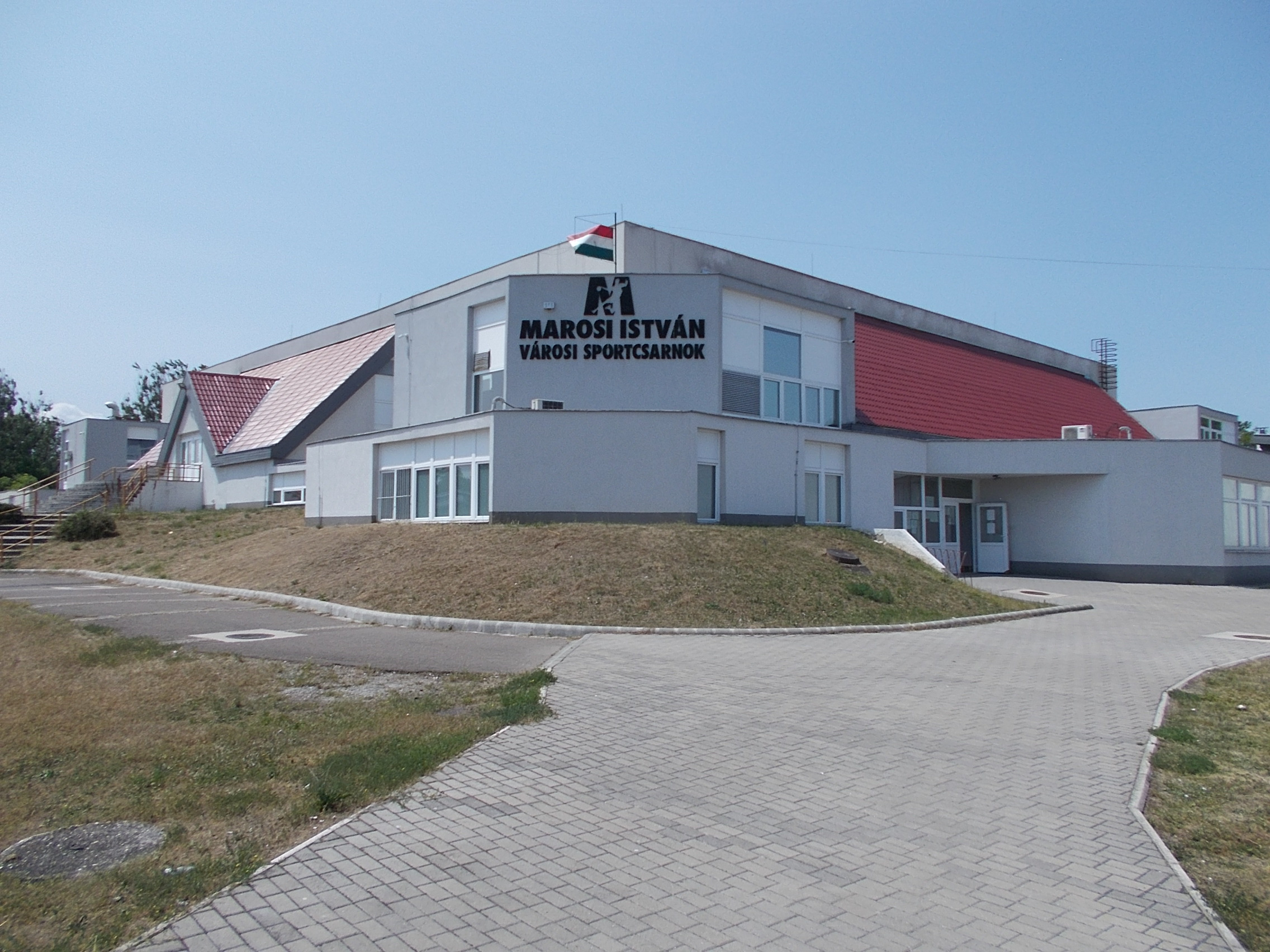
Home hall: Marosi István Városi Sportcsarnok

- Name: – Marosi István Városi Sportcsarnok
- City: – Ózd
- Capacity: – 1000
- Address: – 3600 Ózd, Brassói út 1

== Current squad ==
Squad for the 2022–23 season

Ózdi KC
Goalkeepers: 16 (Hungary) Péter Carlos Moscoso; 32 (Hungary) Péter Ulicsinyi; Left Wingers: (Hungary) Máté Száva; (Hungary) Martin Lestál; Right Wingers: 8 (Hungary) Attila Ménfői; 17 (Hungary) Péter Kovács	Line Players: 9 (Hungary) Gergő Csépányi; 31 (Hungary) Noel Szepesi; 33 (Hungary) Zsigmond Vad; Central Backs: 7 (Hungary) Patrik Tóth; 10 (Hungary) Balázs Veres; 25 (Hungary) András Gál; Left Backs: 6 (Hungary) Balázs Nyeste; 13 (Hungary) Máté Bárdos; 28 (Hungary) Attila Nagy; 88 (Hungary) Ádám Kerezsi; Right Backs	Technical staff: Head coach: Kocsis Csaba; Assistant coach: Goalkeeping coach: Masseur: Club doctor:

=== Transfers ===
Transfers for the 2021–22 season

Joining

- (Hungary) Péter Carlos Moscoso (GK) from (Hungary) SBS-Eger
- (Hungary) András Gál (CB) from (Hungary) Békési FKC
- (Hungary) Zsigmond Vad (LP) from (Hungary) Hatvani KSZSE
- (Hungary) Péter Kovács (RW) from (Hungary) Hatvani KSZSE
- (Hungary) Balázs Veres (CB) from (Hungary) Hatvani KSZSE
- (Hungary) Attila Ménfői (RW) from (Hungary) Balassagyarmati Kábel SE

Leaving

- (Hungary) Dominik Nagy (GK) to (Hungary) Mezőkövesdi KC
- (Hungary) Patrik Tóth (CB) to (Hungary) Ceglédi KKSE
- (Hungary) Norbert Hangyel
- (Hungary) Krisztián Benák
- (Hungary) Gergő Csaba
- (Hungary) Ádám Bécsi
- (Hungary) Attila Péter
- (Hungary) Gergely Zsigmond

== Honours ==
=== Individual awards ===
==== Domestic ====
Nemzeti Bajnokság I Top Scorer

Season	Name	Goals
1968	(Hungary) István Marosi	
1993–94	(Moldova) Serghei Krasnii	

== Recent seasons ==
- Seasons in Nemzeti Bajnokság I: 6
- Seasons in Nemzeti Bajnokság I/B: 18

Season	Division	Pos.	Magyar kupa
1993–94	NB I	7th	
1994–95	NB I	13th	
1995–96	NB I/B Kelet	1st	
1996–97	NB I	9th	
1997–98	NB I	12th	
1998–99	NB I	12th	
1999-00	NB I	11th	
2000–01	NB I/B Kelet	3rd	
2001–02	NB I/B Kelet	2nd	
2002–03	NB I/B Kelet	5th	

Season	Division	Pos.	Magyar kupa
2003–04	NB I/B Kelet	6th	
2004–05	NB I/B Kelet	3rd	
2005–06	NB I/B Kelet	2nd	
2006–07	NB I/B Kelet	4th	
2007–08	NB I/B Kelet	4th	
2008–09	NB I/B Kelet	11th	
2009–10	NB I/B Kelet	11th	
2010–11	NB I/B Kelet	6th	Round 2
2011–12	NB I/B Kelet	9th	Round 4
2012–13	NB I/B Kelet	8th	Round 4

Season	Division	Pos.	Magyar kupa
2013–14	NB I/B Kelet	10th	Quarter-finals
2014–15	NB I/B Kelet	8th	Quarter-finals
2015–16	NB I/B Kelet	7th	Round 2
2016–17	NB I/B Kelet	8th	Round 1
2017–18	NB I/B Kelet	9th	Round 4
2018–19	NB I/B Kelet	6th	Round 1
2019–20	NB I/B Kelet	Cancelled	
2020–21	NB I/B Kelet	6th	Round 1

== Former club members ==
=== Notable former players ===
- (Hungary) László Fekete
- (Hungary) Tamás Frey
- (Hungary) Csaba Kocsis
- (Hungary) Áron Lezák
- (Hungary) István Marosi
- (Hungary) József Padla
- (Moldova) Serghei Krasnii
- (Romania) Costică Buceschi (1999–2000)
- (Serbia) Goran Đukić
- (Slovakia) Maroš Čorej
- (Slovakia) Jan Kucera
- (Slovakia) Pavol Jano
