= Százhalombattai KE =

Hungarian handball club

Százhalombattai KE (Hungary)
- Full name: Százhalombattai Kézilabda Egyesület
- Nickname(s): Batta
- Short name: SZKE
- Founded: 1966; 59 years ago
- Arena: Városi Szabadidő Központ, Százhalombatta
- Capacity: 800
- President: Balázs Kertész
- Head coach: Gergely Koncsár
- League: Nemzeti Bajnokság I/B
- Club colours
Home	Away

Százhalombattai KE is a team handball club from Százhalombatta, Hungary.

Location of Százhalombattai KE

== History ==
The sport of handball was established in Százhalombatta in 1966 when the Dunai Kőolaj Sportkör (DKSK) was established, and the handball department was then established. The adult team is the county II. started performing in class. In 1972, the team won the championship and moved up to the county I. division. In 1980, the team won the county championship and advanced to Nemzeti Bajnokság II. After two years, in 1982, the team was able to celebrate another championship title, with which it was promoted to the Nemzeti Bajnokság I/B class. At first, the team could not maintain its second-class position and fell back to Nemzeti Bajnokság II, but in 1985, by winning the championship, it became a Nemzeti Bajnokság I/B class team again for a long time. The dissolution of the DKSK in 1992 marked a major change in the association's life, when the association was integrated into the SZVSE. In 1997, the team managed by János Koller won the Nemzeti Bajnokság I/B championship with a 100% performance, earning the right to play in the highest division. Even this year, the team won a bronze medal in the Hungarian Cup. After one year, the team dropped out of Nemzeti Bajnokság I and fell back to Nemzeti Bajnokság I/B. In 2000, after another championship title, the door to the Nemzeti Bajnokság I opened again. The team was among the best without interruption until 2005, where its best result was 6th place. The team included players such as Csaba Tombor, Gábor Herbert, Gábor Elek, Vladimir Golovin. In 2004, the Százhalombattai Kézilabda Egyesület (SZKE), which still operates today, was founded. The team suffered from the difficulties of the change, so it spent the 2005-2006 championship in the Nemzeti Bajnokság I/B, from where it immediately returned to the top division with a transfer ticket. Among other things, the champion team included the many-time international players Balázs Kertész and Zsolt Perger, and the team coach was the many-time international player László Sótonyi. This year, the team again made it to the top four teams of the Hungarian Cup. In the following years, the team first finished 9th and then 7th. During this time, new celebrities joined the team, including Árpád Mohácsi and János Bécsi. 2009 was a black year for the club. Moaning the financial difficulties of the previous years, the team coached by Gábor Adorján still successfully completed the regular season, but unfortunately had to say goodbye to Nemzeti Bajnokság I in the playoffs. The management of the association decided in favor of a complete reorganization and nominated the team to the Nemzeti Bajnokság II. He put József Keresztes at the head of the team. The team won the championship with one loss and was promoted to the Nemzeti Bajnokság I/B division, where Balázs Kertész already held the post of president of the association. The team became a stable Nemzeti Bajnokság I/B team. In the first year, he finished in 5th place in the championship. The silver medal won in the 2012/2013 season was an outstanding success. At the end of the 2018/2019 season, the team was relegated to Nemzeti Bajnokság II. The team returned to Nemzeti Bajnokság I/B only after winning the 2020/2021 championship.

== Crest, colours, supporters ==
=== Club crest ===
New Logo
(2016–present)

== Kits ==
HOME
2015–16	2021–

AWAY

2021–

== Team ==
=== Current squad ===
Squad for the 2024–25 season

Százhalombattai KE

Goalkeepers

- 12 (Hungary) Bence Bokréta
- 16 (Hungary) Benedek Kovács
- 24 (Hungary) János Kovács

Left Wingers

- 13 (Hungary) Levente Keresztes
- 20 (Hungary) Tamás Mogyorósi

Right Wingers

- 9 (Hungary) Gábor Fekete
- 30 (Hungary) Kevin Zatureczki
- 33 (Hungary) Miron Paizs

Line Players

- 17 (Hungary) Bence Szabó
- 38 (Hungary) Árpád Gyurcsovics (c)
- 81 (Hungary) Schultheisz Botond

Left Backs

- 22 (Hungary) Szabolcs Szövérdffy
- 34 (Hungary) Máté Kis Molnár
- 36 (Hungary) Zsolt Félegyházi
- 96 (Hungary) Bence Karbucz

Central Backs

- 8 (Hungary) Márk Kreisz
- 10 (Hungary) Zoltán Körtélyesi
- 31 (Hungary) Krisztián Gálli
- 66 (Hungary) Máté Bozi
- 68 (Hungary) Levente Csíkós

Right Backs

- 15 (Hungary) Dávid Horváth
- 88 (Hungary) Dávid Dupsi

=== Technical staff ===
- Head coach: (Hungary) Gergely Koncsár
- Assistant coach: (Hungary) Renátó Nikolicza

=== Transfers ===
Transfers for the 2024–25 season

Joining

- (Hungary) Kevin Zatureczki (RW) from (Hungary) Dabas KK
- (Hungary) Dávid Dupsi (RB) from (Hungary) Dabas KK
- (Hungary) Bence Szabó (LP) from (Hungary) Szigetszentmiklósi KSK
- (Hungary) Márk Kreisz (CB) from (Hungary) Tatai AC
- (Hungary) Zoltán Körtélyesi (CB) from (Hungary) Tatai AC
- (Hungary) Dávid Horváth (RB) from (Hungary) Budai Farkasok KKUK
- (Hungary) Szabolcs Szövérdffy (LB) from (Hungary) Budai Farkasok KKUK
- (Hungary) Bence Karbucz (LB) from (Hungary) BFKA-Balatonfüred
- (Hungary) Benedek Kovács (GK) back from loan at (Hungary) Érdi FKSE

Leaving

== Previous Squads ==
2015–2016 Team
Shirt No	Nationality	Player	Birth Date	Position
2	Hungary	Bence Bordács	9 May 1996 (age 28)	Line Player
3	Hungary	Tibor Balázs	7 April 1983 (age 41)	Left Back
6	Serbia	Aleksandar Ćirić	8 December 1993 (age 31)	Left Back
7	Hungary	Dávid Tarjányi	17 July 1987 (age 37)	Central Back
8	Hungary	Csaba Rádler	23 January 1984 (age 41)	Line Player
10	Hungary	Márk Oláh	15 February 1995 (age 30)	Central Back
12	Hungary	István Pásztor	15 December 1981 (age 43)	Goalkeeper
13	Hungary	Levente Keresztes	13 September 1995 (age 29)	Left Winger
14	Serbia	Dušan Medić	27 July 1992 (age 32)	Central Back
15	Hungary	Viktor Rivnyák	6 March 1991 (age 34)	Line Player
16	Hungary	Richárd Szép	9 July 1994 (age 30)	Goalkeeper
18	Hungary	Gábor Minárovits	10 February 1989 (age 36)	Left Winger
19	Hungary	István Soproni	27 July 1993 (age 31)	Right Winger
21	Hungary	Balázs Soproni	11 August 1988 (age 36)	Right Back
22	Hungary	Balázs Kónya	21 May 1987 (age 37)	Central Back
23	Hungary	Balázs Kővári	22 June 1994 (age 30)	Right Back
24	Hungary	Kristóf Kohut	8 February 1994 (age 31)	Right Back
27	Hungary	Dániel Szenteszki	27 December 1993 (age 31)	Left Back
32	Hungary	Gergely Kovács	26 August 1976 (age 48)	Line Player
88	Hungary	Kristóf Szokoli	21 April 1997 (age 27)	Goalkeeper
93	Hungary	Tamás Lakatos	30 January 1993 (age 32)	Goalkeeper

== Former club members ==
=== Notable former players ===
- (Hungary) József Czina (2007-2008)
- (Hungary) János Dénes
- (Hungary) Gábor Elek
- (Hungary) Gábor Herbert (1999-2001)
- (Hungary) Balázs Kertész
- (Hungary) Árpád Mohácsi
- (Hungary) Máté Nagy
- (Hungary) Zsolt Perger
- (Hungary) Csaba Tombor
- (Hungary) (Austria) Norbert Visy (2005)
- (Hungary) Norbert Vitáris
- (Russia) (Hungary) Vladimir Golovin
- (Serbia) Igor Milicevic
