= Orosházi FKSE =

Hungarian handball club

Orosházi FKSE-LINAMAR
- Full name: Orosházi Férfi Kézilabda Sportegyesület
- Short name: OFKSE
- Founded: 1999; 27 years ago
- Arena: Eötvös Sportcsarnok, Orosháza
- Capacity: 740 seats
- League: Nemzeti Bajnokság I
- Club colours
Home	Away

Orosházi Férfi Kézilabda Sportegyesület is a Hungarian handball club from Orosháza, that plays in the Nemzeti Bajnokság I, the top level championship in Hungary.

The current name of the club is Orosháza FKSE-Linamar due to sponsorship reasons.

Location of Orosházi FKSE

== Crest, colours, supporters ==
=== Naming history ===
Name	Period
Every Day KSE Orosháza	−2005
Orosházi FKSE	2005–2011
Orosházi FKSE-Alexandra	2011–2012
Orosházi FKSE-LINAMAR	2012–2021
Orosházi FKSE-Tokai	2021–present

=== Kit manufacturers and Shirt sponsor ===
The following table shows in detail Orosházi FKSE kit manufacturers and shirt sponsors by year:

Kit manufacturers

Period	Kit manufacturer
– 2004	(Germany) Adidas
2004–2008	(Denmark) Hummel
2008–2009	Royal
2009–2010	(Germany) Jako
2010–2012	(Germany) Erima
2012–2013	(Germany) Puma
2013–2016	(Japan) Asics
2016–present	Pavo

Shirt sponsor

Period	Sponsor
– 2007	Every Day
2007–2008	Every Day / Gyopárosfürdő
2008–2009	Gyopárosfürdő
2009–2010	-
2010–2011	OTP Bank / Linamar / MMD Kreatív Stúdió kft. / Tűzőrség Kft.
2011–2012	Alexandra / OTP Bank / Linamar / MMD Kreatív Stúdió kft. / Tűzőrség Kft.
2012–2013	Linamar / MMD Kreatív Stúdió kft. / Tűzőrség Kft.
2013–2014	Linamar / SWIETELSKY Magyarország Kft.
2014–2015	Linamar / Gyopárosfürdő
2015–2016	Linamar / Continental
2016–2017	Linamar / tippmixPro
2017–2018	Linamar / tippmix
2018–2019	Linamar / Continental
2019–present	Linamar / tippmix

=== Kits ===
HOME
2003–04	2007–08	2009–10	2012-13

== Sports Hall information ==
- Name: – Eötvös Sportcsarnok
- City: – Orosháza
- Capacity: – 740
- Address: – 5900 Orosháza, Eötvös tér 2.

== Management ==
Position	Name
President	(Hungary) Tamás Vayer
Technical manager	(Hungary) Attila Szikora
Member Of The Board	(Hungary) Csaba Havasi
Member Of The Board	(Hungary) Lészló Kéri
Member Of The Board	(Hungary) László Kiss
Member Of The Board	(Hungary) Mihály Zalai
Member Of The Board	(Hungary) Péter Zsedényi
Replacement Technical Leader	(Hungary) Sándor Janowszky

== Current squad ==
Squad for the 2021–22 season

Orosházi FKSE
Goalkeepers: 12 (Hungary) Imre Varga; 16 (Hungary) Márk Majdán; 55 (Hungary) László Pajkó; Left Wingers: 7 (Hungary) Szabolcs Lászlai; 44 (Hungary) László Németh (captain); Right Wingers: 6 (Hungary) Sándor Molnár; 9 (Hungary) Máté Pásztor; Line Players: 14 (Hungary) Szabolcs Döme; 64 (Hungary) Gergő Molnár; 77 (Hungary) Szabolcs Antal	Central Backs: 8 (Hungary) Roland Kiss; 23 (Hungary) Csaba Bella; 41 (Hungary) Károly Attila Tóth; Left Backs: 3 (Hungary) Bence Kovács; 34 (Hungary) Máté Szabó; 37 (Hungary) (Romania) Zsolt Mihály; Right Backs: 13 (Hungary) Dániel Takó	Technical staff: Head coach: (Hungary) Attila Kovács; Assistant coach: (Hungary) Gábor Berta; Goalkeeping coach: (Hungary) (Romania) Levente Szabó; Rehabilitation Trainer: (Hungary) Renáta Szabovik Furákné; Masseur: (Hungary) Imre Molnár; Club doctor: (Hungary) Dr. Ali Alzubi; Club doctor: (Hungary) Dr. János Tóth-Abonyi

=== Transfers ===
Transfers for the 2021–22 season

Joining

- (Hungary) Szabolcs Antal (LP) from (Hungary) Dabas KK
- (Hungary) Dániel Takó (RB) from (Hungary) PLER KC
- (Hungary) Roland Kiss (CB) from (Hungary) Ceglédi KKSE
- (Hungary) Bence Kovács (LB) from (Hungary) Mezőkövesdi KC
- (Hungary) Sándor Molnár (RW) from (Hungary) Köröstarcsai KSK
- (Hungary) László Pajkó (GK) from (Hungary) Békési FKC
- (Hungary) (Romania) Zsolt Mihály (LB) from (Romania) Szejke SK

Leaving

- (Belarus) Alialsei Ushal (LP) to (Hungary) Grundfos Tatabánya KC
- (Turkey) Yunus Özmusul (GK) to (Turkey) Spor Toto SK
- (Bosnia and Herzegovina) Aldin Sakic
- (Slovakia) (Hungary) Ottó Kancel
- (Russia) Alexey Peskov
- (Hungary) Ákos Lele (LB) to (Hungary) Békési FKC

Transfers for the 2020–21 season

Joining

- (Hungary) Szabolcs Lászlai (LW) from (Hungary) Ceglédi KKSE
- (Belarus) Aliaksei Ushal (LP) from (Belarus) SKA Minsk
- (Bosnia and Herzegovina) Aldin Sakic (LB) from (Bosnia and Herzegovina) RK Konjuh
- (Russia) Alexey Peskov (RB) from (Russia) HC Taganrog
- (Hungary) Roland Csányi (LP) from (Hungary) Gyöngyösi KK

Leaving

- (Hungary) Szabolcs Zubai (LP) (retires)
- (Hungary) Balázs Herjeczki (GK) (retires)
- (Hungary) József Ambrus (LW) to (Hungary) Kondorosi KK
- (Georgia (country)) Teimuraz Orjonikidze (LB) to (Romania) CSM Reșița
- (Serbia) Igor Mrsulja (CB) to (Serbia) MRK Kikinda
- (Hungary) Patrik Árpási (LP) to (Hungary) Békési FKC
- (Serbia) Savo Slavuljica (RB) to (Romania) SCM Politehnica Timișoara

Transfers for the 2019–20 season

Joining

- (Georgia (country)) Teimuraz Orjonikidze (LB) from (Hungary) Ferencvárosi TC
- (Slovakia) (Hungary) Ottó Kancel (LB) from (Hungary) Balatonfüredi KSE
- (Serbia) Savo Slavuljica (RB) from (Serbia) RK Novi Pazar
- (Serbia) Igor Mrsulja (CB) from (Netherlands) HV KRAS/Volendam
- (Hungary) Gábor Busa (GK) from (France) JS Cherbourg
- (Egypt) Khaled Essam (LW) from (Hungary) Rév TSC
- (Ukraine) Yevhen Buinenko (LB) from (Saudi Arabia) Al-Wehda
- (Hungary) Patrik Árpási (LP) from (Hungary) FKSE Algyő
- (Turkey) Yunus Özmusul (GK) from (Greece) AEK Athens
- (Hungary) Károly Attila Tóth (CB) from (Hungary) Balmazújvárosi KK
- (Hungary) Csaba Bella (CB) from (Hungary) PLER KC

Leaving

- (Hungary) (Romania) Botond Ferenczi (RB) to (Hungary) Békési FKC
- (Hungary) (Romania) Botond Balázs (CB) to (Romania) Szejke SK
- (Hungary) (Romania) Zsolt Mihály (LB) to (Romania) Szejke SK
- (Hungary) (Romania) Levente Szabó (GK) (retires)
- (Hungary) István Mátó (LP) to (Hungary) Tatai AC
- (Hungary) Roland Sándor (CB) to (Hungary) Hatvani KSZSE
- (Hungary) Gábor Karap (RB) to (Germany) TSV Altensteig
- (Hungary) Csanád Zalai (LW) to (Hungary) Tigrisek Csongrádi KSE
- (Hungary) Attila Zvolenszki (LP) to (Hungary) Tigrisek Csongrádi KSE
- (Egypt) Khaled Essam (LW) to (Hungary) Rév TSC
- (Ukraine) Yevhen Buinenko (LB) to (Poland) SPR Chrobry Głogów
- (Hungary) Gábor Busa (GK) to (Switzerland) TSV Fortitudo Gossau

Transfers for the 2018–19 season

Joining

- (Hungary) Szabolcs Zubai (LP) from (Hungary) Mol-Pick Szeged
- (Hungary) Ákos Lele (LB) from (Hungary) Gyöngyösi KK
- (Hungary) István Mátó (LP) from (Hungary) Tatai AC
- (Hungary) Gábor Karap (RB) from (Hungary) Balmazújvárosi KK
- (Hungary) József Ambrus (LW) from (Hungary) FKSE Algyő
- (Hungary) Szabolcs Döme (LP) from (Hungary) FKSE Algyő
- (Hungary) Roland Sándor (CB) from (Hungary) FKSE Algyő

Leaving

- (Croatia) (United States) Domagoj Srsen (LP) to (Germany) TSV Hannover-Burgdorf
- (North Macedonia) Nikola Markoski (LP) to (North Macedonia) RK Eurofarm Pelister
- (Serbia) Marko Knežević (CB) to (Serbia) RK Železničar
- (Serbia) Nikola Milošević (LB) to (Qatar) Al Arabi SC
- (Brazil) Felipe Roberto Braz (LP) to (Italy) Handball Sassari
- (Hungary) János Stranigg (LB) to (Hungary) Váci KSE
- (Hungary) Norbert Gyene (RW) to (Hungary) Veszprém KKFT Felsőörs
- (Hungary) Szabolcs Antal (LP) to (Hungary) Váci KSE
- (Hungary) Zoltán Morva (LW) to (Hungary) Békési FKC
- (Hungary) Gábor Németh (RB) to (Hungary) FKSE Algyő
- (Hungary) András John (CB) to (Hungary) FKSE Algyő
- (Hungary) Csaba Bella (CB) to (Hungary) PLER KC

Transfers for the 2017–18 season

Joining

- (Hungary) János Stranigg (LB) from (Denmark) Mors-Thy Håndbold
- (Hungary) Norbert Gyene (RW) from (Hungary) Telekom Veszprém
- (Hungary) (Romania) Zsolt Mihály (LB) from (Romania) HC Odorheiu Secuiesc
- (Hungary) (Romania) Botond Balázs (CB) from (Romania) HC Odorheiu Secuiesc
- (Brazil) Felipe Roberto Braz (LP) from (Brazil) Esporte Clube Pinheiros
- (Serbia) Nikola Milošević (LB) from (Serbia) RK Železničar
- (Hungary) András John (CB) from (Hungary) FKSE Algyő

Leaving

- (Hungary) (Romania) Attila Komporály (RW) to (Romania) Szejke SK
- (Hungary) Gergő Miklós (GK) to (Hungary) Veszprém KKFT Felsőörs
- (Hungary) Szabolcs Döme (LP) to (Hungary) FKSE Algyő
- (Hungary) András John (CB) to (Hungary) FKSE Algyő
- (Hungary) Dániel Buday (CB) to (Hungary) Hatvani KSZSE
- (Bosnia and Herzegovina) Ivan Milas (LB) to (United Arab Emirates) Shabab Al-Ahli Dubai
- (Serbia) Zoran Radojević (LB) to (Luxembourg) Handball Käerjeng

Transfers for the 2016–17 season

Joining

- (North Macedonia) Nikola Markoski (LP) from (North Macedonia) RK Rabotnicki
- (Israel) Niv Levy (LB) from (Israel) ASA Tel Aviv
- (Hungary) (Romania) Botond Ferenczi (RB) from (Romania) HC Odorheiu Secuiesc
- (Hungary) Szabolcs Antal (LP) from (Hungary) Mezőkövesdi KC
- (Hungary) Zoltán Morva (LW) from (Hungary) Balmazújvárosi KK
- (Hungary) Tamás Oláh (RB) from (Hungary) PLER KC
- (Hungary) Szabolcs Döme (LP) from (Hungary) Csurgói KK
- (Croatia) (United States) Domagoj Srsen (LP) from (France) Istres Provence Handball
- (Hungary) (Romania) Levente Szabó (GK) from (Romania) Segesvári VSK
- (Hungary) András John (CB)

Leaving

- (Serbia) Milan Mažić (LP) to (Germany) HSV Hannover
- (Hungary) János Stranigg (LB) to (Denmark) Mors-Thy Håndbold
- (Slovenia) Igor Žabić (LP) to (Portugal) Sporting CP
- (Slovenia) Matevž Čemas (LB) to (Switzerland) TSV St. Otmar St. Gallen
- (Bosnia and Herzegovina) Emir Suhonjić (RB) to (Italy) SC Meran
- (Hungary) Gábor Berta (CB) to (Hungary) Makói KC
- (Hungary) Áron Varsandán (CB) to (Hungary) Békési FKC
- (Israel) Niv Levy (LB) to (Israel) Maccabi Castro Tel Aviv

Transfers for the 2015–16 season

Joining

- (Moldova) Pavel Macovchin (LB) from (Moldova) HC Olimpus-85-USEFS
- (Bosnia and Herzegovina) Emir Suhonjić (RB) from (Bosnia and Herzegovina) RK Sloboda Tuzla
- (Hungary) (Romania) Attila Komporály (RW) from (Romania) HC Odorheiu Secuiesc
- (Croatia) Dominik Smojver (LP) from (Croatia) HRK Karlovac
- (Bosnia and Herzegovina) Ivan Milas (LB) from (Poland) Gwardia Opole
- (Serbia) Zoran Radojević (LB) from (Poland) Slask Wroclaw
- (Slovenia) Igor Žabić (LP) from (Poland) Slask Wroclaw

Leaving

- (Serbia) Tibor Ivanišević (GK) to (Bosnia and Herzegovina) RK Borac Banja Luka
- (Serbia) Igor Milović (RB) to (Switzerland) TSV St. Otmar St. Gallen
- (Serbia) Dušan Marić (RW) to (Germany) HSV Bad Blankenburg
- (Hungary) Mohamed Yassine Benmiloud (LP) to (Hungary) PLER KC
- (Hungary) Bence Benis (RW) to (Hungary) Mezőkövesdi KC
- (Hungary) Zoltán Morva (LW) to (Hungary) Balmazújvárosi KK
- (Moldova) Pavel Macovchin (LB) to (Moldova) HC Olimpus-85-USEFS
- (Croatia) Dominik Smojver (LP) to (Bosnia and Herzegovina) RK Borac Banja Luka

Transfers for the 2014–15 season

Joining

- (Hungary) Bence Benis (RW) from (Hungary) Mezőkövesdi KC
- (Slovenia) Matevž Čemas (LB) from (Austria) SC Ferlach
- (Hungary) Gábor Németh (RB) from (Hungary) ETO-SZESE Győr
- (Hungary) Bence Tarkányi (RW) from (Hungary) ETO-SZESE Győr
- (Hungary) Máté Pásztor (RW) from (Hungary) MKB-MVM Veszprém
- (Hungary) László Szeitl (LP) from (Hungary) MKB-MVM Veszprém
- (Hungary) Gergő Miklós (GK) from (Hungary) Csurgói KK

Leaving

- (Hungary) Ákos Balda (RW) to (Hungary) Nyíregyházi SC
- (Hungary) Richárd Bali (LB) to (Hungary) Balmazújvárosi KK
- (Hungary) Tibor Cifra (LB) to (Hungary) Békési FKC
- (Hungary) András Raffai (CB) to (Hungary) FKSE Algyő

Transfers for the 2013–14 season

Joining

- (Hungary) Dániel Buday (CB) from (Hungary) Pick Szeged
- (Hungary) László Németh (LW) from (Hungary) Balatonfüredi KSE
- (Serbia) Tibor Ivanišević (GK) from (Serbia) RK Crvena Zvezda
- (Serbia) Igor Milović (RB) from (Serbia) Napredak Kruševac
- (Hungary) János Stranigg (LB) from (Hungary) MKB-MVM Veszprém
- (Hungary) Tibor Cifra (LB) from (Hungary) Csurgói KK
- (Hungary) Áron Varsandán (CB) from (Hungary) Békési FKC

Leaving

- (Hungary) Sándor Bajusz (LB) to (Hungary) Budakalász FKC
- (Serbia) Goran Đukić (RB) to (Hungary) Mezőkövesdi KC
- (Hungary) Szabolcs Lászlai (LW) to (Hungary) Ceglédi KKSE
- (Hungary) Ádám Kanyó (LW) to (Hungary) Grundfos Tatabánya KC

== Previous Squads ==
2018–2019 Team
Shirt No	Nationality	Player	Birth Date	Position
1	Hungary	Balázs Herjeczki	10 July 1987 (age 38)	Goalkeeper
2	Hungary	József Ambrus	4 February 1979 (age 47)	Left Winger
5	Hungary	Gábor Karap	5 March 1993 (age 33)	Right Back
9	Hungary	Máté Pásztor	6 August 1993 (age 32)	Right Winger
11	Hungary	István Mátó	20 April 1994 (age 32)	Line Player
12	HungaryRomania	Levente Szabó	20 December 1979 (age 46)	Goalkeeper
14	Hungary	Szabolcs Döme	2 March 1994 (age 32)	Line Player
16	Hungary	Márk Majdán	14 April 1998 (age 28)	Goalkeeper
17	Hungary	Szabolcs Zubai	31 March 1984 (age 42)	Line Player
19	Hungary	Ákos Lele	24 March 1988 (age 38)	Left Back
23	Hungary	Roland Sándor	13 March 1989 (age 37)	Central Back
28	HungaryRomania	Botond Ferenczi	3 June 1987 (age 39)	Right Back
31	Hungary	Attila Zvolenszki	28 June 1998 (age 28)	Line Player
32	Hungary	Axel Kiss	14 October 2000 (age 25)	Right Winger
34	Hungary	Csaba Bella	17 March 1997 (age 29)	Central Back
37	HungaryRomania	Zsolt Mihály	25 June 1998 (age 28)	Left Back
44	Hungary	László Németh	30 April 1989 (age 37)	Left Winger
74	Hungary	Csanád Zalai	13 October 1997 (age 28)	Left Winger
97	HungaryRomania	Botond Balázs	21 May 1997 (age 29)	Central Back

2017–2018 Team
Shirt No	Nationality	Player	Birth Date	Position
1	Hungary	Balázs Herjeczki	10 July 1987 (age 38)	Goalkeeper
2	Hungary	János Stranigg	2 February 1995 (age 31)	Left Back
3	Croatia	Domagoj Sršen	31 December 1990 (age 35)	Line Player
4	North Macedonia	Nikola Markoski	22 May 1990 (age 36)	Line Player
9	Hungary	Máté Pásztor	6 August 1993 (age 32)	Right Winger
10	Hungary	András John	16 August 1990 (age 35)	Central Back
12	HungaryRomania	Levente Szabó	20 December 1979 (age 46)	Goalkeeper
15	Hungary	Norbert Gyene	18 April 1994 (age 32)	Right Winger
16	Hungary	Márk Majdán	14 April 1998 (age 28)	Goalkeeper
19	Hungary	Zoltán Morva	29 October 1990 (age 35)	Left Winger
20	Serbia	Zoran Radojević	8 September 1981 (age 44)	Left Back
23	Bosnia and Herzegovina	Ivan Milas	15 October 1992 (age 33)	Left Back
24	Serbia	Marko Knežević	30 September 1993 (age 32)	Central Back
25	Brazil	Felipe Roberto Braz	26 November 1994 (age 31)	Line Player
28	HungaryRomania	Botond Ferenczi	3 June 1987 (age 39)	Right Back
31	Hungary	Attila Zvolenszki	28 June 1998 (age 28)	Line Player
32	Hungary	Axel Kiss	14 October 2000 (age 25)	Right Winger
34	Hungary	Csaba Bella	17 March 1997 (age 29)	Central Back
37	HungaryRomania	Zsolt Mihály	25 June 1998 (age 28)	Left Back
44	Hungary	László Németh	30 April 1989 (age 37)	Left Winger
55	Hungary	Gábor Németh	29 April 1990 (age 36)	Right Back
74	Hungary	Csanád Zalai	13 October 1997 (age 28)	Left Winger
77	Hungary	Szabolcs Antal	7 July 1990 (age 35)	Line Player
94	Serbia	Nikola Milošević	11 March 1994 (age 32)	Left Back
97	Hungary	Botond Balázs	21 May 1997 (age 29)	Central Back

2014–2015 Team
Shirt No	Nationality	Player	Birth Date	Position
1	Hungary	Balázs Herjeczki	10 July 1987 (age 38)	Goalkeeper
2	Hungary	Dániel Buday	5 January 1981 (age 45)	Central Back
3	Hungary	László Szeitl	1 June 1994 (age 32)	Line Player
4	Hungary	János Stranigg	2 February 1995 (age 31)	Left Back
5	Serbia	Marko Knežević	30 September 1993 (age 32)	Central Back
6	Hungary	Gábor Berta	31 March 1984 (age 42)	Central Back
9	Hungary	Zoltán Morva	29 October 1990 (age 35)	Left Winger
10	Slovenia	Matevž Čemas	16 November 1988 (age 37)	Left Back
12	Serbia	Tibor Ivanišević	16 August 1990 (age 35)	Goalkeeper
14	Serbia	Igor Milović	10 June 1989 (age 37)	Right Back
15	Hungary	Áron Varsandán	15 June 1991 (age 35)	Central Back
16	Hungary	Gergő Miklós	4 November 1994 (age 31)	Goalkeeper
18	Hungary	Gábor Németh	29 April 1990 (age 36)	Right Back
19	Serbia	Dušan Marić	23 March 1993 (age 33)	Right Winger
22	Serbia	Milan Mažić	14 November 1990 (age 35)	Line Player
23	Hungary	Mohamed Yassine Benmiloud	4 March 1990 (age 36)	Line Player
25	Hungary	Máté Pásztor	6 August 1993 (age 32)	Right Winger
32	Hungary	Bence Benis	22 February 1989 (age 37)	Right Winger
44	Hungary	László Németh	30 April 1989 (age 37)	Left Winger
92	Hungary	Bence Tarkányi	2 November 1988 (age 37)	Right Winger

2009–2010 Team
Shirt No	Nationality	Player	Birth Date	Position
1	Hungary	Balázs Herjeczki	10 July 1987 (age 38)	Goalkeeper
2	Hungary	József Ambrus	4 February 1979 (age 47)	Left Winger
3	Hungary	András Raffai	10 December 1977 (age 48)	Central Back
4	Hungary	Attila Kovács	20 July 1987 (age 38)	Central Back
5	Hungary	Attila Bajúsz	6 August 1975 (age 50)	Left Winger
6	Hungary	Gábor Berta	31 March 1984 (age 42)	Central Back
7	Hungary	Róbert Kardos	9 February 1986 (age 40)	Left Winger
8	Hungary	Péter Gazsó	22 April 1987 (age 39)	Line Player
9	Hungary	László Dunkl	29 July 1987 (age 38)	Line Player
11	Hungary	Attila Kotormán	10 November 1972 (age 53)	Right Back
12	Hungary	Attila Szikora	18 April 1972 (age 54)	Goalkeeper
14	Hungary	Attila Varga	9 July 1987 (age 38)	Central Back
15	Hungary	Ádám Országh	6 October 1989 (age 36)	Right Winger
16	Hungary	Róbert Kovács	24 December 1985 (age 40)	Goalkeeper
18	Hungary	Balázs Kósa	14 May 1986 (age 40)	Left Back
20	Hungary	Ákos Balda	9 August 1987 (age 38)	Right Winger
21	Serbia	Goran Đukić	3 March 1978 (age 48)	Right Back

2002–2003 Team
Shirt No	Nationality	Player	Birth Date	Position
1	HungaryRomania	Levente Szabó	20 December 1979 (age 46)	Goalkeeper
2	Hungary	József Ambrus	4 February 1979 (age 47)	Left Winger
3	Hungary	Imre Bánfi	23 August 1984 (age 41)	Central Back
4	Hungary	Viktor Harsányi	30 July 1981 (age 44)	Central Back
5	Hungary	Attila Bajúsz	6 August 1975 (age 50)	Left Winger
7	Hungary	József Czina	24 November 1980 (age 45)	Left Back
9	Hungary	Csaba Kocsis	1 October 1985 (age 40)	Line Player
10	Hungary	Péter Gúnya	14 April 1975 (age 51)	Right Winger
11	Hungary	István Pásztor	19 December 1966 (age 59)	Left Back
12	Hungary	Attila Szikora	18 April 1972 (age 54)	Goalkeeper
13	Hungary	Zoltán Németh	16 April 1968 (age 58)	Right Back
14	Hungary	István Dayka	11 July 1966 (age 59)	Central Back
15	Hungary	István Rosta	3 August 1972 (age 53)	Line Player
16	Hungary	Zoltán Szász	19 June 1977 (age 49)	Goalkeeper
17	Hungary	Gábor Oláh	21 January 1980 (age 46)	Right Back
18	Hungary	Krisztián Patócskai	20 January 1980 (age 46)	Left Back

== Top Scorers ==
Season	Player	Apps/Goals
2004–2005	(Hungary) Attila Bajúsz	26/123
2005–2006	(Hungary) Attila Bajúsz	25/129
2006–2007	(Hungary) Gábor Berta	26/87
2007–2008	(Hungary) Attila Bajúsz	22/98
2008–2009	(Hungary) Ákos Balda	22/141
2009–2010	(Hungary) Ákos Balda	26/138
2010–2011	(Hungary) Gergő Lókodi	30/171
2011–2012	(Serbia) Goran Đukić	27/129
2012–2013	(Hungary) Ákos Balda	28/126
2013–2014	(Hungary) Dániel Buday	30/133
2014–2015	(Hungary) Dániel Buday	24/104
2015–2016	(Hungary) Dániel Buday	34/148
2016–2017	(Serbia) Marko Knežević	24/104
2017–2018	(Hungary) László Németh	26/82
2018–2019	(Hungary) László Németh	22/98
2019–2020	Cancelled	
2020–2021	(Hungary) Károly Attila Tóth	26/105

== Honours ==
Honours		No.	Years
League
Nemzeti Bajnokság I/B	Winners	3	2000–01, 2009–10, 2018–19
Nemzeti Bajnokság I/B	Third Place	1	2008–09
Domestic Cups
Magyar Kupa	Third Place	1	2002–03
Best European Results
EHF Cup	Third qualifying round	1	2014–15

== Recent seasons ==
As of 20 Aug 2020.

- Seasons in Nemzeti Bajnokság I: 12
- Seasons in Nemzeti Bajnokság I/B: 9
- Seasons in Nemzeti Bajnokság II: 1

Season	Division	Pos.	Magyar kupa
1999-00	NB II Délkelet	1st	
2000–01	NB I/B Kelet	1st	
2001–02	NB I	4th	
2002–03	NB I	8th	Third place
2003–04	NB I/B Kelet	4th	
2004–05	NB I/B Kelet	7th	
2005–06	NB I/B Kelet	6th	

Season	Division	Pos.	Magyar kupa
2006–07	NB I/B Kelet	6th	
2007–08	NB I/B Kelet	5th	
2008–09	NB I/B Kelet	3nd	
2009–10	NB I/B Kelet	1st	
2010–11	NB I	11th	

Season	Division	Pos.	Magyar kupa
2011–12	NB I	9th	
2012–13	NB I	9th	
2013–14	NB I	7th	
2014–15	NB I	6th	
2015–16	NB I	9th	Quarter-finals

Season	Division	Pos.	Magyar kupa
2016–17	NB I	7th	Round 3
2017–18	NB I	14th	Round 4
2018–19	NB I/B Kelet	1st	Round 3
2019–20	NB I	Cancelled	
2020–21	NB I	14th	Round 3

=== In European competition ===
Orosháza score listed first. As of 25 November 2018.

- Participations in EHF Cup: 2x

Season	Competition	Round	Club	Home	Away	Aggregate
2002–03	EHF Cup	Second round	(Ukraine) Portovik Yuzhny	26–34	26–26	52–60
2014–15	EHF Cup	First qualifying round	(Moldova) HC Olimpus-85-USEFS	28–28	34–28	62–56
2014–15	EHF Cup	Second qualifying round	(Belgium) Hubo Initia Hasselt	30–21	26–25	56–46
2014–15	EHF Cup	Third qualifying round	(Denmark) Skjern Håndbold	25–32	20–40	45–72

== EHF Ranking ==
As of 01/10/2021

Rank	Team	Points
285	(England) Cambridge HC	3
286	(Slovakia) HK agro Topoľčany	3
287	(Hungary) Orosházi FKSE	3
288	(Belgium) KV Sasja HC	3
289	(Montenegro) MRK Jedinstvo	3
290	(England) Ruislip Eagles Handball Club	3
291	(Romania) HC Buzău	3

== Former club members ==
=== Notable former players ===
- (Hungary) József Ambrus
- (Hungary) Sándor Bajusz
- (Hungary) Mohamed Yassine Benmiloud
- (Hungary) Dániel Buday
- (Hungary) József Czina
- (Hungary) (Romania) Botond Ferenczi
- (Hungary) Tamás Frey
- (Hungary) Péter Gúnya
- (Hungary) Norbert Gyene
- (Hungary) Ákos Balda
- (Hungary) (Cuba) Julien Lopez Humberto
- (Hungary) (Serbia) Marinko Kekezović
- (Hungary) (Romania) Attila Komporály
- (Hungary) Ákos Lele
- (Hungary) Gergő Lókodi
- (Hungary) László Németh
- (Hungary) Gábor Oláh
- (Hungary) Ádám Országh
- (Hungary) István Rosta
- (Hungary) János Stranigg
- (Hungary) Norbert Sutka
- (Hungary) (Romania) Levente Szabó
- (Hungary) Milán Varsandán
- (Hungary) (Austria) Norbert Visy
- (Hungary) Szabolcs Zubai
- (Bosnia and Herzegovina) Ivan Milas
- (Bosnia and Herzegovina) Aldin Sakic
- (Bosnia and Herzegovina) Gradimir Sančanin
- (Bosnia and Herzegovina) Emir Suhonjić
- (Belarus) Aliaksei Ushal
- (Brazil) Felipe Roberto Braz
- (Croatia) Dominik Smojver
- (Croatia) (United States) Domagoj Srsen
- (Egypt) Khaled Essam
- (Georgia (country)) Teimuraz Orjonikidze
- (Israel) Niv Levy
- (Moldova) Pavel Macovchin
- (North Macedonia) Nikola Markoski
- (Russia) Alexey Peskov
- (Slovakia) (Hungary) Ottó Kancel
- (Slovakia) Matus Mino
- (Slovenia) Matevž Čemas
- (Slovenia) Igor Žabić (2016)
- (Serbia) Goran Đukić
- (Serbia) Jožef Holpert (2012)
- (Serbia) Tibor Ivanišević
- (Serbia) Marko Knežević
- (Serbia) Dušan Marić
- (Serbia) Milan Mažić
- (Serbia) David Miloradović
- (Serbia) Igor Milović
- (Serbia) Igor Mrsulja
- (Serbia) Zoran Radojević
- (Serbia) Savo Slavuljica
- (Turkey) Yunus Özmusul
- (Ukraine) Yevhen Buinenko

=== Former coaches ===
Seasons	Coach	Country
2009–2010	Ferenc Füzesi	(Hungary)
2010–2011	Ferenc Buday	(Hungary)
2011–2013	Ferenc Füzesi	(Hungary)
2013–2016	Vladan Jordović	(Serbia)
2016–2017	Dániel Buday	(Hungary)
2017–2019	Botond Bakó	(Hungary)
2019–2021	Ratko Đurković	(Montenegro)
2021–	Attila Kovács	(Hungary)
