= Dabas KK =

Handball club in Dabas, Hungary

- Full name: Dabasi Kézilabda Klub
- Short name: DKK, Dabas
- Founded: 1980; 46 years ago
- Arena: OBO Aréna, Dabas
- Capacity: 1,920 seats
- President: Csaba Prohászka
- Head coach: Győző Tomori
- League: Nemzeti Bajnokság I
- 2021–22: Nemzeti Bajnokság I, 11th of 14
- Club colours
Home	Away

Dabas KK is a Hungarian handball club from Dabas, Hungary, that played in the Nemzeti Bajnokság I, the top level championship in Hungary.

The current name of the club is BEPELOG Dabas due to sponsorship reasons.

Location of Dabas KK

== Crest, colours, supporters ==
=== Naming history ===
Name	Period
Dabas SE	−2002
Dabas VSE	2002–2004
Dabas SE	2004–2005
Dabas-Diego KC	2005–2012
Dabas VSE KC	2012–2015
Dabas KC VSE	2015–2018
RotaChrom Dabas	2018–2019
Dabasi KC VSE	2019–present

=== Kit manufacturers ===
Period	Kit manufacturer
– 2013	(Germany) Jako
2013–2015	(Germany) Erima
2015–2017	(Germany) Jako
2017–2022	(Denmark) Hummel
2022 – present	(Germany) Erima

=== Kits ===
HOME
2011–12	2015–17	2017–18	2022–23	2023–24

AWAY
2015–17	2017–18	2019–20	2022–23	2023–24

== Sports Hall information ==
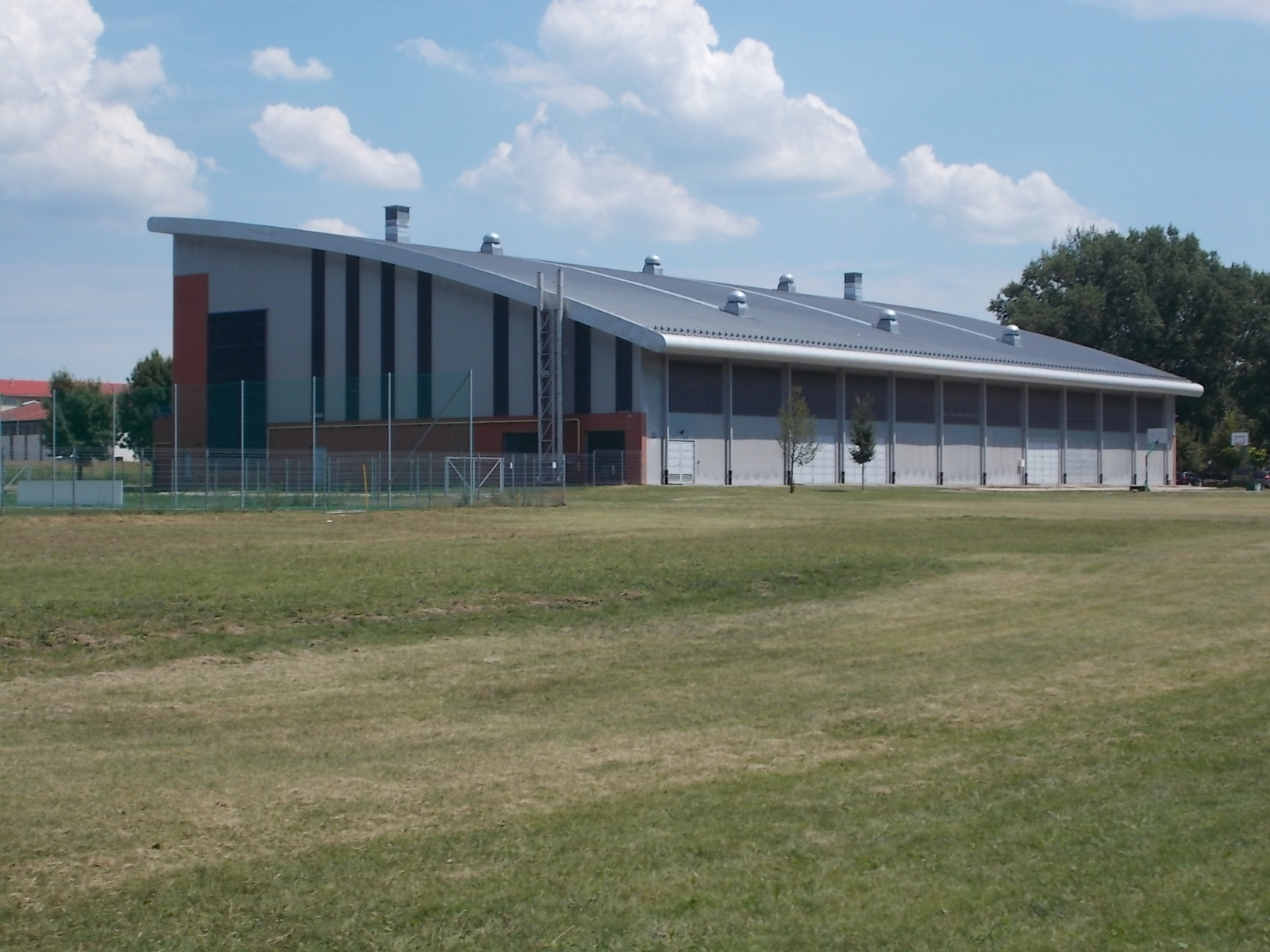
Home hall: OBO Aréna

- Name: – OBO Aréna
- City: – Dabas
- Capacity: – 1920
- Address: – 2370 Dabas, Iskola u. 5.

== Management ==
Position	Name
President	(Hungary) Csaba Prohászka
Youth Director	(Hungary) Dávid Bakos

== Team ==
=== Current squad ===
Squad for the 2024–25 season

Dabas KK

Goalkeepers

- 16 (Hungary) Tibor Nagy
- 21 (Hungary) Gergely Szikora
- 29 (Hungary) Péter Pallag

Left Wingers

- 48 (Hungary) Alex Katona
- (Hungary) Bálint Ág

Right Wingers

- 17 (Croatia) Zlatko Horvat
- 19 (Hungary) Gergő Kádár
- 74 (Hungary) Tamás Ács
- (Hungary) Levente Tisza

Line Players

- 5 (Hungary) Gábor Garajszki
- 14 (Hungary) Nándor Bognár
- 28 (Hungary) Szabolcs Szöllősi (c)
- 78 (Hungary) Dániel Hunyadi

Central Backs

- 9 (Hungary) Bence Bálint
- 10 (Montenegro) Andrej Dobrkovic
- 18 (Hungary) Kristóf Gáspár
- 24 (Hungary) Patrik Havas
- 30 (Hungary) Ádám Török

Left Backs

- 33 (Hungary) Tamás Koller
- 92 (Hungary) Bence Zdolik

Right Backs

- 15 (Hungary) Bálint Fekete

=== Technical staff ===
- Head Coach: (Hungary) Győző Tomori
- Assistant Coach: (Hungary) Ákos Volcz
- Goalkeeping Coach: (Hungary) Péter Prohászka
- Fitness coach: (Hungary) Máté Kiss
- Masseur: (Hungary) Sándor Kovács
- Technical Director: (Hungary) István Szilágyi

=== Transfers ===
Transfers for the 2026–27 season

Joining

- (Hungary) Norbert Balogh (RB) from (Hungary) Carbonex-Komló
- (Hungary) Borisz Dörnyei (RW) from (Hungary) QHB-Eger
- (Hungary) László Szökrényes (LP) from (Hungary) ONE Veszprém U21
- (Hungary) Máté Vidovenyecz (LB) on loan from (Hungary) OTP Bank - Pick Szeged U21
- (Hungary) Csongor Várszegi (LB) on loan from (Hungary) PLER-Budapest
- (Hungary) Marcell Stramszky (CB) on loan from (Hungary) PLER-Budapest
- (Hungary) Botond Szladovics (RB) on loan from (Hungary) NEKA

Leaving

- (Hungary) Gellért Ásványi (LP) to (Hungary) HE-DO B. Braun Gyöngyös
- (Hungary) Hunor Hermann (CB)
- (Hungary) Ákos Kindla (CB)
- (Hungary) Balázs Boros (RB)
- (Hungary) Áron Császár (LB)
- (Hungary) Fülöp Hunyadi (LP)
- (Hungary) Rajmond Kakuk (RW)
- (Hungary) Ákos Hulló (CB) loan back to (Hungary) NEKA

Transfers for the 2025–26 season

Joining

- (Hungary) Hunor Hermann (CB) from (France) C' Chartres MHB
- (Hungary) Balázs Laurinyecz (LW) from (Hungary) Győri ETO-UNI FKC
- (Hungary) Gellért Ásványi (LP) from (Hungary) Győri ETO-UNI FKC
- (Hungary) Gergő Kovács (CB) from (Hungary) HE-DO B. Braun Gyöngyös
- (Hungary) Dávid Hajzer (LP) from (Hungary) NEKA
- (Hungary) Áron Császár (LB) from (Hungary) NEKA
- (Hungary) Balázs Boros (RB) from (Hungary) Szigetszentmiklósi KSK
- (Hungary) Péter Ladányi (RB) from (Hungary) Ceglédi KKSE
- (Hungary) Ákos Hulló (CB) on loan from (Hungary) NEKA

Leaving

- (Croatia) Zlatko Horvat (RW) to (Croatia) RK Dubrava
- (Bosnia and Herzegovina) Dean Šešić (RB) to (Turkey) Nilüfer Belediyespor
- (Montenegro) Andrej Dobrkovic (CB) to (Slovakia) HT Tatran Prešov
- (Hungary) Szabolcs Szöllősi (LP) to (Hungary) Ceglédi KKSE
- (Hungary) Bálint Fekete (RB) to (Hungary) Balatonfüredi KSE
- (Hungary) Gábor Garajszki (LP) to (Hungary) Balatonfüredi KSE
- (Hungary) Tamás Koller (LB) to (Hungary) Ferencvárosi TC
- (Hungary) Bálint Ág (LW) to (Hungary) Carbonex-Komló
- (Hungary) Tibor Nagy (GK) to (Hungary) Budakalász FKC
- (Hungary) Ádám Török (CB) to (Hungary) NEKA
- (Hungary) Alex Katona (LW) to (Hungary) QHB-Eger
- (Hungary) Bence Bálint (LB) to (Hungary) HE-DO B. Braun Gyöngyös
- (Hungary) Gergő Kádár (RW)
- (Hungary) István Mátés (CB) loan back to (Hungary) Győri ETO-UNI FKC

Transfers for the 2024–25 season

Joining

- (Hungary) Bálint Ág (LW) from (Hungary) Ceglédi KKSE
- (Hungary) Levente Tisza (RW) from (Hungary) NEKA
- (Bosnia and Herzegovina) Dean Šešić (RB) from (Poland) KS Azoty-Puławy
- (Hungary) István Mátés (CB) on loan from (Hungary) Győri ETO-UNI FKC

Leaving

- (Hungary) Balázs Laurinyecz (LW) to (Hungary) Győri ETO-UNI FKC
- (Hungary) Bence Szeverényi (CB) to (Hungary) Szigetszentmiklósi KSK
- (Hungary) Kevin Zatureczki (RW) to (Hungary) Százhalombattai KE
- (Hungary) Dávid Dupsi (RB) to (Hungary) Százhalombattai KE
- (Hungary) Roland Széll (GK) to (Hungary) Csurgói KK
- (Hungary) Nándor Bognár (LP) to (Hungary) PLER-Budapest

Transfers for the 2023–24 season

Joining

- (Hungary) Ádám Török (CB) from (Hungary) Ferencvárosi TC
- (Hungary) Dániel Hunyadi (LP) from (Hungary) Szigetszentmiklósi KSK
- (Hungary) Bence Szeverényi (CB) from (Hungary) Kecskeméti TE
- (Montenegro) Andrej Dobrkovic (CB) from (North Macedonia) RK Vardar

Leaving

- (Bosnia and Herzegovina) Marko Tarabochia (CB) to (Hungary) Fejér B.Á.L. Veszprém
- (Hungary) Ákos Hutvágner (RW) to (Hungary) Budakalász FKC
- (Hungary) Kevin Zatureczki (RW) on loan at (Hungary) Tatai AC
- (Croatia) Zlatko Horvat (RW) on loan at (Croatia) RK Zagreb

Transfers for the 2022–23 season

Joining

- (Hungary) Bence Zdolik (LB) from (Hungary) Grundfos Tatabánya KC
- (Hungary) Bence Bálint (LB) from (Hungary) Grundfos Tatabánya KC
- (Hungary) Nándor Bognár (LP) from (Hungary) Grundfos Tatabánya KC
- (Hungary) Tibor Nagy (GK) from (Hungary) Pick Szeged

Leaving

- (Hungary) Balázs Holló (GK) to (Hungary) Csurgói KK
- (Hungary) Ádám Török (CB) to (Hungary) Ferencvárosi TC
- (Hungary) László Horváth (CB) to (Hungary) Békési FKC
- (Hungary) Milán Váczi (CB) to (Hungary) Szigetszentmiklósi KSK
- (Hungary) Péter Kende (CB) loan back to (Hungary) Ferencvárosi TC
- (Hungary) Bence Burony (LP) loan back to (Hungary) Ferencvárosi TC

Transfers for the 2021–22 season

Joining

- (Bosnia and Herzegovina) Marko Tarabochia (CB) from (North Macedonia) RK Metalurg Skopje
- (Hungary) Péter Pallag (GK) on loan from (Hungary) Csurgói KK
- (Hungary) Péter Kende (CB) on loan from (Hungary) Ferencvárosi TC
- (Hungary) Bence Burony (LP) on loan from (Hungary) Ferencvárosi TC
- (Croatia) Zlatko Horvat (RW) from (North Macedonia) RK Metalurg Skopje

Leaving

- (Hungary) Ádám Tóth (RW) to (Hungary) Csurgói KK
- (Hungary) Szabolcs Antal (LP) to (Hungary) Orosházi FKSE
- (Hungary) János Podoba (GK) to (Hungary) Veszprém KKFT Felsőörs
- (Hungary) Máté Kurucz (RB) to (Hungary) Veszprém KKFT Felsőörs
- (Hungary) Ákos Hermann (GK) to (Hungary) BFKA-Balatonfüred U22
- (Hungary) Péter Hajdú (LB)

Transfers for the 2020–21 season

Joining

- (Hungary) Tamás Koller (LB) from (Hungary) Budakalász FKC
- (Hungary) Ádám Török (CB) from (Hungary) Budakalász FKC
- (Hungary) Milán Váczi (CB) from (Hungary) Budakalász FKC
- (Hungary) Ádám Tóth (RW) from (Hungary) Budakalász FKC
- (Hungary) Péter Hajdú (LB) from (Hungary) Ceglédi KKSE
- (Hungary) Bálint Fekete (RB) from (Spain) Liberbank Cuenca
- (Hungary) László Horváth (CB) from (Hungary) Balatonfüredi KSE

Leaving

- (Hungary) Levente Halász (LB) to (Hungary) Gyöngyösi KK
- (Serbia) (Hungary) Marinko Kekezović (LW) (retires)
- (Hungary) Tibor Balogh (GK) to (Hungary) DVTK-Eger
- (Serbia) Marko Krsmančić (CB) to (Austria) Alpla HC Hard
- (Hungary) István Császár (CB)
- (Hungary) Bence Mikita (CB) to (Spain) CB San Jose Obrero
- (Hungary) Sándor Lepsényi (LB) (retires)
- (Hungary) Bence Zakics (LW) to (Hungary) Ceglédi KKSE
- (Hungary) Ádám Országh (RW) to (Hungary) Kecskeméti TE
- (Hungary) Bence Szabó (LP) to (Hungary) Hatvani KSZSE
- (Montenegro) Ivan Perišić (RB) to (Hungary) Budakalász FKC

Transfers for the 2019–20 season

Joining

- (Serbia) Marko Krsmančić (CB) from (Turkey) Besiktas
- (Serbia) Vuk Milenković (LP) from (Serbia) RK Partizan
- (Hungary) Tibor Balogh (GK) from (Hungary) Csurgói KK
- (Hungary) Bence Szabó (LP) from (Hungary) Ceglédi KKSE
- (Hungary) Bence Mikita (CB) from (Hungary) Mezőkövesdi KC
- (Hungary) Szabolcs Antal (LP) from (Hungary) Váci KSE
- (Hungary) István Császár (CB) from (Hungary) NEKA

Leaving

- (Hungary) Balázs Bíró (CB) to (Hungary) Kecskeméti TE
- (Hungary) Norbert Duleba (GK) to (Hungary) Budakalászi SC
- (Hungary) Attila Kiss (LB) to (Hungary) Mizse KC
- (Hungary) Tamás Borsos (LB) to (Hungary) Csurgói KK
- (Montenegro) Nebojša Simović (LP) to (Romania) HC Dobrogea Sud Constanța
- (Serbia) Vuk Milenković (LP) to (Slovenia) RK Slovenj Gradec
- (Ukraine) Eduard Klyuyko (CB) to (Switzerland) HS Biel

Transfers for the 2018–19 season

Joining

- (Hungary) Szabolcs Szöllősi (LP) from (Hungary) Grundfos Tatabánya KC
- (Hungary) Péter Pallag (GK) from (Hungary) Ceglédi KKSE
- (Hungary) Tamás Borsos (LB) from (Hungary) Ceglédi KKSE
- (Hungary) Koppány Törteli (CB) from (Hungary) Váci KSE
- (Ukraine) Eduard Klyuyko (CB) from (Netherlands) KRAS/Volendam

Leaving

- (Hungary) Dávid Bakos (RB) (retires)
- (Hungary) Rajmund Pocsai (RW) to (Hungary) Ceglédi KKSE
- (Hungary) László Szeitl (LP) to (Hungary) Veszprém KKFT Felsőörs
- (Hungary) Bence Priczel (LP) to (Hungary) Veszprém KKFT Felsőörs
- (Japan) Tanaka Kei (CB) to (Japan) Wakunaga Pharmaceutical
- (Hungary) Ádám Korsós (CB) to (Hungary) Szigetszentmiklósi KSK
- (Hungary) Olivér Szöllősi (LP) loan back to (Hungary) Balatonfüredi KSE
- (Czech Republic) Petr Šlachta (LP) to (Germany) EHV Aue
- (Hungary) Koppány Törteli (CB) to (Hungary) Váci KSE

Transfers for the 2017–18 season

Joining

- (Serbia) (Hungary) Marinko Kekezović (LW) from (Hungary) Balmazújvárosi KK
- (Montenegro) Nebojša Simović (LP) from (Hungary) Balmazújvárosi KK
- (Czech Republic) Petr Šlachta (LP) from (Czech Republic) HC Zubří
- (Hungary) Ádám Országh (RW) from (Hungary) Gyöngyösi KK
- (Hungary) Balázs Holló (GK) from (Hungary) Mezőkövesdi KC
- (Hungary) Gergő Lókodi (LB) from (Hungary) Mezőkövesdi KC
- (Hungary) Balázs Bíró (CB) from (Hungary) Ceglédi KKSE
- (Hungary) Levente Halász (LB) from (Hungary) Csurgói KK
- (North Macedonia) Mihail Petrovski (RB) from (Hungary) Balatonfüredi KSE
- (Japan) Tanaka Kei (CB) from (Japan) Univ. of Tsukuba
- (Japan) Shinnosuke Tokuda (RB) from (Japan) Univ. of Tsukuba
- (Montenegro) Ivan Perišić (RB) from (Hungary) Ceglédi KKSE
- (Hungary) Bence Priczel (LP) from (Hungary) Nyíregyházi SC
- (Hungary) Olivér Szöllősi (LP) on loan from (Hungary) Balatonfüredi KSE

Leaving

- (Hungary) Gábor Szalafai (RW) to (Hungary) Budakalászi SC
- (Hungary) István Bodorovics (LP) (retires)
- (Hungary) Bence Priczel (LP) to (Hungary) Nyíregyházi SC
- (Hungary) Tamás Boda (LB) to (Hungary) Nyíregyházi SC
- (Hungary) Alex Gubó (LB) to (Hungary) Nyíregyházi SC
- (Hungary) Hugó Kedves (RW) to (Hungary) KK Ajka
- (Hungary) Patrik Vizes (CB) to (Switzerland) TV Möhlin
- (Hungary) Ferenc Kovacsics (LW) to (Hungary) Pécsi VSE
- (Hungary) Tamás Hajdu (CB) to (Hungary) Ceglédi KKSE
- (North Macedonia) Mihail Petrovski (RB) to (North Macedonia) Eurofarm Rabotnik
- (Hungary) Gergő Lókodi (LB)
- (Hungary) Péter Kovács (GK) (retires)

== Previous squads ==
2022–2023 Team
Shirt No	Nationality	Player	Birth Date	Position
5	Hungary	Gábor Garajszki	13 October 1999 (age 26)	Line Player
9	Hungary	Bence Bálint	19 June 2000 (age 26)	Central Back
14	Hungary	Nándor Bognár	29 September 2001 (age 24)	Line Player
15	Hungary	Bálint Fekete	27 June 1995 (age 31)	Right Back
16	Hungary	Tibor Nagy	13 January 2001 (age 25)	Goalkeeper
17	Croatia	Zlatko Horvat	25 September 1984 (age 41)	Right Winger
18	Hungary	Kristóf Gáspár	4 June 2002 (age 24)	Central Back
23	Hungary	Balázs Laurinyecz	1 December 2000 (age 25)	Left Winger
26	Bosnia and Herzegovina	Marko Tarabochia	28 November 1988 (age 37)	Central Back
28	Hungary	Szabolcs Szöllősi	28 January 1989 (age 37)	Line Player
29	Hungary	Péter Pallag	22 May 1990 (age 36)	Goalkeeper
33	Hungary	Tamás Koller	30 September 1992 (age 33)	Left Back
34	Hungary	Bertold Talabér	27 February 2004 (age 22)	Central Back
43	Hungary	Szabolcs Tóth	3 February 2003 (age 23)	Central Back
48	Hungary	Alex Katona	25 August 1999 (age 26)	Left Winger
71	Hungary	Ákos Hutvágner	27 May 2003 (age 23)	Right Winger
72	Hungary	Gergely Szikora	14 May 2003 (age 23)	Goalkeeper
74	Hungary	Tamás Ács	15 April 1999 (age 27)	Right Winger
92	Hungary	Bence Zdolik	16 May 1992 (age 34)	Left Back

2018–2019 Team
Shirt No	Nationality	Player	Birth Date	Position
1	Hungary	János Podoba	11 July 2000 (age 26)	Goalkeeper
2	Czech Republic	Petr Šlachta	1 January 1993 (age 33)	Line Player
5	Hungary	Gábor Garajszki	13 October 1999 (age 26)	Line Player
7	Japan	Shinnosuke Tokuda	6 December 1995 (age 30)	Right Back
10	Hungary	Levente Halász	24 July 1988 (age 38)	Left Back
11	Hungary	Bence Zakics	8 January 1994 (age 32)	Left Winger
12	Hungary	Balázs Holló	26 March 1992 (age 34)	Goalkeeper
13	Montenegro	Ivan Perišić	21 April 1990 (age 36)	Right Back
14	Ukraine	Eduard Klyuyko	22 July 1992 (age 34)	Central Back
15	Hungary	Tamás Borsos	13 June 1990 (age 36)	Left Back
16	Hungary	Norbert Duleba	27 June 1976 (age 50)	Goalkeeper
17	Hungary	Attila Kiss	13 January 1994 (age 32)	Left Back
20	Hungary	Sándor Lepsényi	23 March 1989 (age 37)	Left Back
23	Hungary	Ádám Országh	6 October 1989 (age 36)	Right Winger
26	Hungary	Koppány Törteli	2 October 1994 (age 31)	Central Back
28	Hungary	Szabolcs Szöllősi	28 January 1989 (age 37)	Line Player
29	Hungary	Péter Pallag	22 May 1990 (age 36)	Goalkeeper
33	Montenegro	Nebojša Simović	15 November 1993 (age 32)	Line Player
66	Hungary/Serbia	Marinko Kekezović	20 August 1985 (age 40)	Left Winger
74	Hungary	Tamás Ács	15 April 1999 (age 27)	Right Winger
88	Hungary	Balázs Bíró	27 September 1983 (age 42)	Central Back

2017–2018 Team
Shirt No	Nationality	Player	Birth Date	Position
1	Hungary	János Podoba	11 July 2000 (age 26)	Goalkeeper
2	Czech Republic	Petr Šlachta	1 January 1993 (age 33)	Line Player
3	Hungary	László Szeitl	1 June 1994 (age 32)	Line Player
6	Hungary	Dávid Bakos	9 April 1982 (age 44)	Right Back
7	North Macedonia	Mihail Petrovski	22 December 1983 (age 42)	Right Back
7	Japan	Shinnosuke Tokuda	6 December 1995 (age 30)	Right Back
8	Hungary	Ádám Korsós	28 April 1988 (age 38)	Central Back
9	Hungary	Olivér Szöllősi	6 February 1998 (age 28)	Line Player
10	Hungary	Levente Halász	24 July 1988 (age 38)	Left Back
11	Hungary	Bence Zakics	8 January 1994 (age 32)	Left Winger
12	Hungary	Balázs Holló	26 March 1992 (age 34)	Goalkeeper
13	Hungary	Gergő Lókodi	19 March 1989 (age 37)	Left Back
13	Montenegro	Ivan Perišić	21 April 1990 (age 36)	Right Back
16	Hungary	Norbert Duleba	27 June 1976 (age 50)	Goalkeeper
17	Hungary	Attila Kiss	13 January 1994 (age 32)	Left Back
20	Hungary	Sándor Lepsényi	23 March 1989 (age 37)	Left Back
21	Japan	Tanaka Kei	16 October 1994 (age 31)	Central Back
23	Hungary	Ádám Országh	6 October 1989 (age 36)	Right Winger
33	Hungary	Bence Priczel	27 July 1993 (age 32)	Line Player
33	Montenegro	Nebojša Simović	15 November 1993 (age 32)	Line Player
44	Hungary	Tamás Hajdu	25 November 1992 (age 33)	Central Back
46	Hungary	Péter Kovács	17 February 1985 (age 41)	Goalkeeper
53	Hungary	Balázs Laurinyecz	1 December 1999 (age 26)	Left Winger
66	Hungary/Serbia	Marinko Kekezović	20 August 1985 (age 40)	Left Winger
74	Hungary	Tamás Ács	15 April 1999 (age 27)	Right Winger
84	Hungary	Rajmund Pocsai	30 December 1984 (age 41)	Right Winger
88	Hungary	Balázs Bíró	27 September 1983 (age 42)	Central Back

2016–2017 Team
Shirt No	Nationality	Player	Birth Date	Position
1	Hungary	János Podoba	11 July 2000 (age 26)	Goalkeeper
2	Hungary	Ferenc Kovacsics	12 February 1993 (age 33)	Left Winger
3	Hungary	László Szeitl	1 June 1994 (age 32)	Line Player
5	Hungary	István Bodorovics	31 August 1981 (age 44)	Line Player
6	Hungary	Dávid Bakos	9 April 1982 (age 44)	Right Back
7	Hungary	Tamás Boda	21 September 1990 (age 35)	Left Back
8	Hungary	Patrik Vizes	13 January 1994 (age 32)	Central Back
9	Hungary	Bálint Bácskai	8 April 1999 (age 27)	Right Winger
11	Hungary	Bence Zakics	8 January 1994 (age 32)	Left Winger
16	Hungary	Norbert Duleba	27 June 1976 (age 50)	Goalkeeper
17	Hungary	Attila Kiss	13 January 1994 (age 32)	Left Back
19	Hungary	Máté Hollós	28 May 1990 (age 36)	Left Winger
20	Hungary	Sándor Lepsényi	23 March 1989 (age 37)	Left Back
29	Hungary	Alex Gubó	19 April 1991 (age 35)	Left Back
33	Hungary	Bence Priczel	27 July 1993 (age 32)	Line Player
44	Hungary	Tamás Hajdu	25 November 1992 (age 33)	Central Back
46	Hungary	Péter Kovács	17 February 1985 (age 41)	Goalkeeper
55	Hungary	Hugó Kedves	4 March 1998 (age 28)	Right Winger
84	Hungary	Rajmund Pocsai	30 December 1984 (age 41)	Right Winger
88	Hungary	Ádám Korsós	28 April 1988 (age 38)	Central Back
89	Hungary	Tamás Ács	15 April 1999 (age 27)	Right Winger
95	Hungary	Gábor Szalafai	13 April 1985 (age 41)	Right Winger

== Top scorers ==
Season	Player	Apps/Goals
2005–2006	(Hungary) Péter Csecsetka	25/146
2006–2007	(Hungary) Péter Csecsetka	26/140
2007–2008	(Hungary) Péter Csecsetka	22/144
2008–2009	(Hungary) István Dr. Kiss	22/122
2009–2010	(Hungary) István Dr. Kiss	26/256
2010–2011	(Hungary) Zoltán Hímer	24/122
2011–2012	(Hungary) Zoltán Hímer	25/122
2012–2013	(Hungary) Zoltán Hímer	24/129
2013–2014	(Hungary) Tamás Boda	23/98
2014–2015	(Hungary) Mátyás Rév	26/102
2015–2016	(Hungary) Rajmund Pocsai	26/97
2016–2017	(Hungary) Rajmund Pocsai	24/103
2017–2018	(Hungary) Levente Halász	23/100
2018–2019	(Hungary) Tamás Borsos	26/91
2019–2020	Cancelled	
2020–2021	(Hungary) Ádám Tóth	24/102
2021–2022	(Bosnia and Herzegovina) Marko Tarabochia	24/96
2022–2023	(Croatia) Zlatko Horvat	25/110
2023–2024	(Hungary) Ádám Török	24/99

== Honours ==
Honours	No.	Years
League
Nemzeti Bajnokság I/B Winners	1	2016–17
Nemzeti Bajnokság I/B Runners-up	3	2010–11, 2011–12, 2015–16
Nemzeti Bajnokság I/B Third Place	3	2009–10, 2012–13, 2014–15
Domestic Cups
Magyar Kupa Third Place	1	2022–23

== Recent seasons ==
As of 30/08/2024

- Seasons in Nemzeti Bajnokság I: 8
- Seasons in Nemzeti Bajnokság I/B: 13

Season	Division	Pos.	Magyar kupa
2000–01	County I	1st	
2001–02	NB II Dél	4th	
2002–03	NB II Dél	6th	
2003–04	NB II Dél	1st	
2004–05	NB I/B Nyugat	10th	
2005–06	NB I/B Nyugat	7th	
2006–07	NB I/B Nyugat	6th	
2007–08	NB I/B Nyugat	5rd	

Season	Division	Pos.	Magyar kupa
2008–09	NB I/B Kelet	5th	
2009–10	NB I/B Kelet	3th	
2010–11	NB I/B Kelet	2th	
2011–12	NB I/B Kelet	2th	
2012–13	NB I/B Nyugat	3th	
2013–14	NB I/B Nyugat	5th	
2014–15	NB I/B Nyugat	3rd	
2015–16	NB I/B Nyugat	2st	Round 1

Season	Division	Pos.	Magyar kupa
2016–17	NB I/B Nyugat	1st	Round 1
2017–18	NB I	8th	Round 3
2018–19	NB I	8th	Fourth place
2019–20	NB I	Cancelled	
2020–21	NB I	12th	Round 4
2021–22	NB I	11th	Round 3
2022–23	NB I		Third place
2023–24	NB I	9th	Fourth place
2024–25	NB I		

== EHF ranking ==
As of 25/09/2025

Rank	Team	Points
266	(Denmark) TMS Ringsted	2
267	(Slovenia) RD Koper	2
268	(Croatia) RK Međimurje	2
269	(Hungary) Dabas KK	2
270	(Romania) SCM Politehnica Timișoara	2
271	(Israel) Hapoel Rishon LeZion	2
272	(Lithuania) KTU Kaunas	2

== Former club members ==
=== Notable former players ===
==== Goalkeepers ====
- (Hungary) Levente Nagy
- (Hungary) Péter Pallag (2018–2019, 2020–)

==== Right wingers ====
- (Hungary) Bendegúz Bujdosó (2014–2015)
- (Hungary) Ádám Országh
- (Hungary) Gábor Szalafai
- (Hungary) Ádám Tóth (2020–2021)
- (Croatia) Zlatko Horvat (2022–)

==== Left wingers ====
- (Hungary) (Serbia) Marinko Kekezović (2017–2021)

==== Line players ====
- (Hungary) Szabolcs Szöllősi (2018–)
- (Czech Republic) Petr Šlachta (2017–2018)
- (Montenegro) Nebojša Simović (2017–2019)

==== Left backs ====
- (Hungary) Tamás Borsos (2017–2019)
- (Hungary) Bence Zdolik (2022–)

==== Central backs ====
- (Bosnia and Herzegovina) Marko Tarabochia (2021–2023)
- (Serbia) Marko Krsmančić (2019–2020)

==== Right backs ====
- (Hungary) Dávid Bakos
- (Hungary) Bálint Fekete (2020–)
- (Hungary) Zsolt Szobol
- (Japan) Shinnosuke Tokuda
- (Montenegro) Ivan Perišić (2017–2020)

=== Former coaches ===
Seasons	Coach	Country
2007–2017	Zoltán Szilágyi	(Hungary)
2017–	Győző Tomori	(Hungary)
