= Szabolcs Szöllősi =

Hungarian handball player (born 1989)

Personal information
- Nationality: Hungarian
- Born: 28 January 1989 (age 37) Gyula, Hungary
- Height: 1.94 m (6 ft 4 in)

Sport
- Sport: Handball
- Position: Pivot
- Current club: Dabas KK
- Number: 28

Youth career
- Years: Team
- 2003–2005: Békéscsabai BDSK
- 2005–2007: Veszprém KC

Senior clubs
- Years: Team
- 2007–2008: Veszprém KC
- 2008–2015: Csurgói KK
- 2015–2018: Grundfos Tatabánya KC
- 2018–: Dabas KK
National team
Years	Team	Apps	(Gls)
2011–	Hungary	102	(120)

Szabolcs Szöllősi (Hungarian: [ˈsɒbolt͡ʃ ˈsølløːʃi]; born 28 January 1989) is a Hungarian handballer for Dabas KK and the Hungarian national team.

== Early years ==
Szöllősi initially went to a sports school where he practiced football. Later he switched to water polo and even participated in the students' national championship. He first tried handball when he was in the eighth grade and since then it has been his only sport. Szöllősi learned the basics of handball by Békéscsabai BDSK (2003–2005) and was soon spotted by major domestic teams, including KC Veszprém, of whom offer he accepted in 2005.

== Career ==
=== Club ===
In his first period in the Veszprém youth team Szöllősi played either as a playmaker or a back and only moved to line player position while in the first team. He made his league debut in October 2007 against Gyöngyösi KK, however, due to the lack of playing minutes he decided to leave at the end of the season and eventually switched to recently promoted Csurgói KK.

In Csurgó, Szöllősi evolved to a prolific goalscorer; in his first compete senior season he scored 33 goals, and finished with 35 a year later. In the 2010–2011 season he already scored 66 goals and a year later it went up to 80. Thanks to his performances, in 2011 he received his first senior call-up to the Hungarian national team.

=== International ===
Szöllsői was part of the Hungarian national pool since the younger age categories and played at the 2008 Junior European Championship, where Hungary finished 10th. He made his senior international debut on 8 June 2011 in a European Championship qualification game against Bosnia and Herzegovina. Szöllősi contributed with one goal to the 22–19 Hungarian victory.

He participated at his first major tournament a year later. Initially, he was not named to the travelling squad for the 2012 European Championship, however, after Tamás Iváncsik's injury he was called up as a late replacement. Szöllősi got a total of 41 playing minutes in the tournament, during which time he scored two goals and also forced out a penalty shot in the dying seconds against Spain, which Gábor Császár converted, saving the match for a draw. In acknowledgement of his achievements, he was awarded the Sportsman of Somogy County prize in January 2012.

Szöllősi did not make into the Hungarian squad for the 2012 Summer Olympics, but earned his place for the 2013 World Championship. With a shooting percentage of 90% – 19 goals from 21 shots – Szöllősi was his team's fourth best goalscorer in the tournament, where Hungary eventually finished in the eighth position.

== Personal life ==
He is married, his wife is Szandra Zácsik, Hungarian handballer. Their daughter, Hanna was born on 25 March 2015, and their son, Borisz was born in April 2019.
