= Oross =

Oross is a Hungarian surname. Notable people with the surname include:

- Márton Oross (born 1981), Hungarian football player and manager
- Tibor Oross (1961–1998), Hungarian handball player
