= Kekezović =

Surname list

Kekezović (Serbian Cyrillic: Кекезовић) is a Serbian surname. It may refer to:

- Dejan Kekezović (born 1982), Serbian footballer
- Marinko Kekezović (born 1985), Serbian handballer

== See also ==
- Kekez, surname
