= Peter Šlachta =

Czech handball player

Petr Šlachta
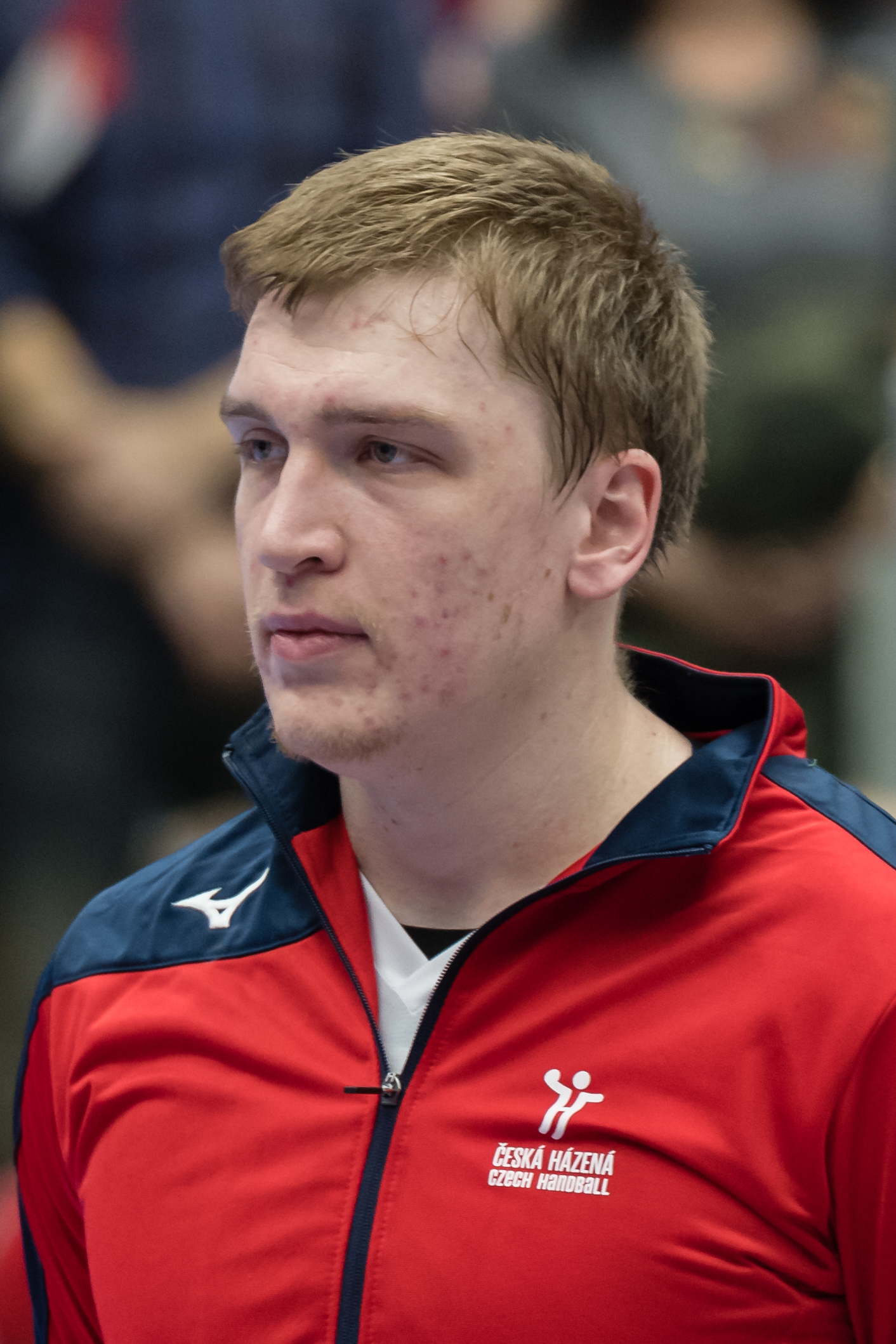
- Petr Šlachta in 2018

Personal information
- Nationality: Czech
- Born: 1 January 1993 (age 33) Valašské Meziříčí, Czech Republic
- Height: 1.99 m (6 ft 6 in)

Sport
- Sport: Handball
- Position: Pivot
- Current club: EHV Aue
- Number: 22

Senior clubs
- Years: Team
- -2017: HC Robe Zubří
- 2017-2018: Dabas KK
- 2018-: EHV Aue
National team
Years	Team	Apps	(Gls)
2015-	Czech Republic	43	(40)
- Updated on 23 April 2024

Petr Šlachta (born 1 January 1993) is a Czech handball player for EHV Aue and the Czech national team. He has previously played for HC Robe Zubří in his native Czechia and Dabas KK in Hungary.

He participated at the 2018 European Men's Handball Championship.
