= Aleksandar Stojanović (handballer) =

Serbian handball player (born 1983)

Personal information
- Full name: Aleksandar Stojanović
- Nationality: Serbian
- Born: 22 June 1983 (age 43) Svetozarevo, SR Serbia, SFR Yugoslavia
- Height: 1.97 m (6 ft 6 in)

Sport
- Sport: Handball
- Position: Right back
- Current club: RK Goč Merkur
- Number: 22

Youth career
- Years: Team
- –: Jagodina

Senior clubs
- Years: Team
- 2001–2004: Vrbas
- 2004–2006: Vardar
- 2006–2008: Celje
- 2008–2009: Koper
- 2009: → Metalurg Skopje (loan)
- 2009–2016: Kadetten Schaffhausen
- 2016–2017: Balmazújvárosi KK
- 2017–2018: Antalyaspor
- 2018–2019: Istres
- 2019–2021: Železničar 1949
- 2021–2022: Partizan
- 2022: RK Vranje 1957
- 2022: Bnei Herzliya
- 2022–2023: RK Goč Merkur
- 2023–: RK Rudar (Kostolac)
National team
- Years: Team
- 2006–2010: Serbia
Medal record
Men's handball
Representing Serbia
Mediterranean Games
Gold medal – first place	2009 Pescara	Team

Aleksandar Stojanović (Serbian Cyrillic: Александар Стојановић; born 22 June 1983) is a Serbian handball player for RK Rudar (Kostolac).

== Career ==
Over the course of his career, Stojanović played in Slovenia (Celje and Koper), Macedonia (Vardar and Metalurg Skopje), Switzerland (Kadetten Schaffhausen), Hungary (Balmazújvárosi KK), Turkey (Antalyaspor), France (Istres), Israel (Bnei Herzliya) and his native Serbia (Vrbas, Železničar 1949, Partizan, RK Vranje 1957, RK Goč Merkur and now RK Rudar Kostolac).

At international level, Stojanović represented Serbia in two major tournaments (2009 World Men's Handball Championship and 2010 European Men's Handball Championship).

== Honours ==
Celje

- Slovenian First League: 2006–07, 2007–08
- Slovenian Cup: 2006–07

Kadetten Schaffhausen

- Swiss Handball League: 2009–10, 2010–11, 2011–12, 2013–14, 2014–15, 2015–16
