= Igor Žabić =

Slovenian handball player (born 1992)

Personal information
- Nationality: Slovenian
- Born: 15 August 1992 (age 34) Celje, Slovenia
- Height: 2.02 m (6 ft 8 in)

Sport
- Sport: Handball
- Position: Pivot

Senior clubs
- Years: Team
- 2011–2014: RK Celje
- 2014–2015: RK Maribor Branik
- 2015: Śląsk Wrocław
- 2016: Orosházi FKSE
- 2016–2017: Sporting CP
- 2017–2020: Wisła Płock
- 2020–2022: Limoges Handball
- 2022–2023: Kadetten Schaffhausen
- 2023: AEK Athens
- 2024: RK Celje
- 2024–2025: RD Ribnica
National team
Years	Team	Apps	(Gls)
2017–2021	Slovenia	34	(46)

Igor Žabić (born 15 August 1992) is a Slovenian handball player.

Žabić represented Slovenia at the 2018 European Men's Handball Championship.
