= Gergő Iváncsik =

Hungarian handball player (born 1981)

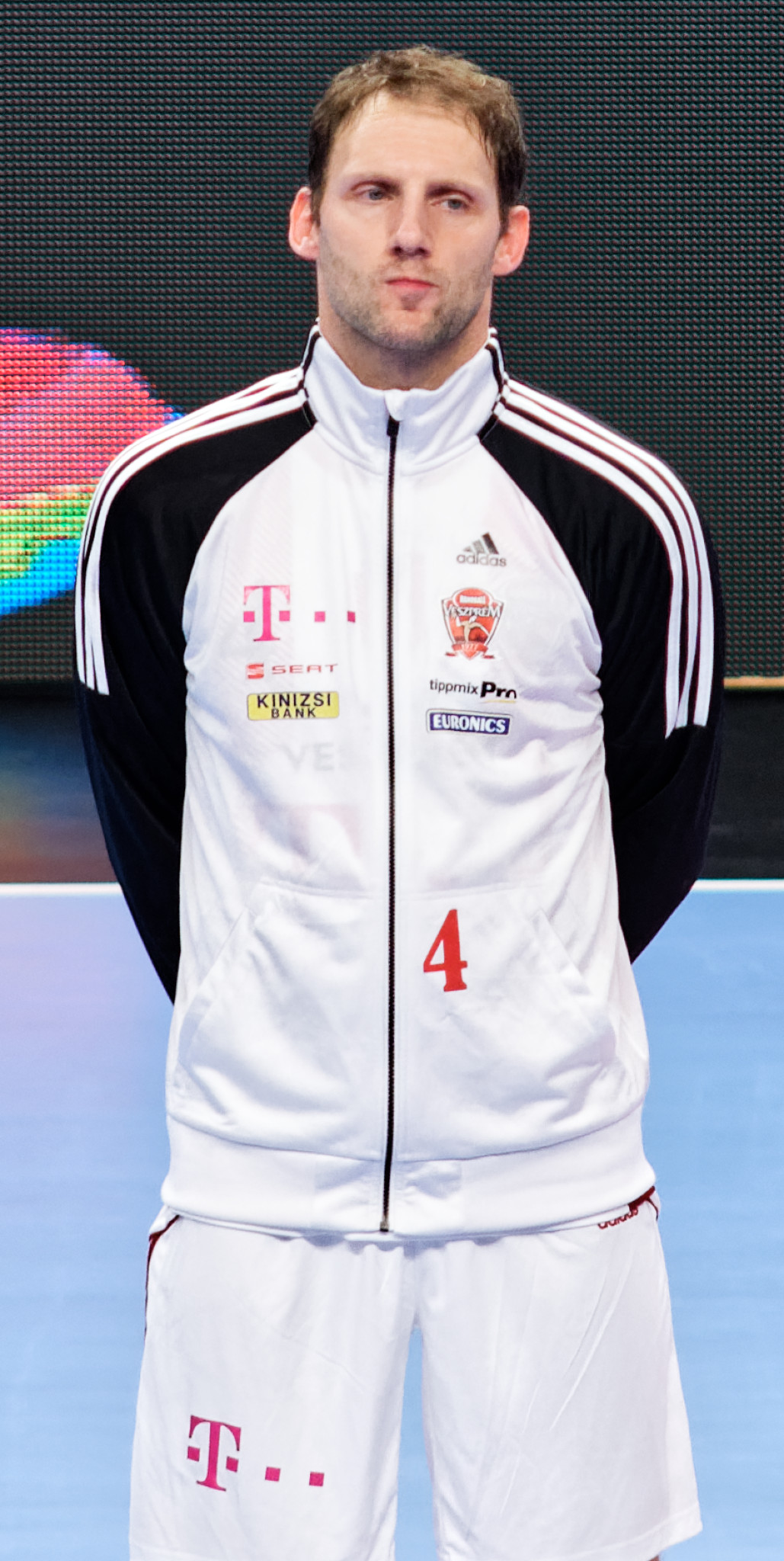

Personal information
- Nationality: Hungarian
- Born: 30 November 1981 (age 44) Győr, Hungary
- Height: 1.90 m (6 ft 3 in)

Sport
- Sport: Handball
- Position: Left wing
- Current club: Retired

Youth career
- Years: Team
- –1998: (Hungary) ETO-SZESE Győr FKC

Senior clubs
- Years: Team
- 1998–2000: (Hungary) ETO-SZESE Győr FKC
- 2000–2017: (Hungary) Telekom Veszprém
National team
Years	Team	Apps	(Gls)
2000–2017	Hungary	270	(696)

Gergő Iváncsik (born 30 November 1981) is a former Hungarian handballer who played for Telekom Veszprém and for the Hungarian national team. He retired from handball in 2017.

He was inducted into the EHF Hall of Fame in 2024.

== Career ==
=== Club ===
He started to play handball at the age of nine in the elementary school and later became a member of the ETO-SZESE Győr FKC youth team. He made her senior debut for the Győr-based club in 1998.

The talented left winger quickly caught the eyes of Hungarian top club Veszprém KC, and he was signed by the champions in 2000. Since then, Iváncsik won a number of various medals and trophies both on domestic and continental level, including the EHF Cup Winners' Cup title in 2008.

=== International ===
He won a gold medal at the European Youth Championship in 1999 and led the Hungarian national team to fourth place at the Junior World Championships in 2001. He made his full international debut against Austria on 26 October 2000. His first major tournament was the 2003 World Championship. He participated at further four World Championships (2007, 2009, 2011, 2013) and was present at seven European Championships (2004, 2006, 2008, 2010, 2012, 2014, 2016). He was also member of the Hungarian team that finished fourth at the 2004 Olympic Games and 2012 Olympic Games.

== Personal ==
His father, Mihály Iváncsik is a former handball player, who has won the IHF Cup in 1986 and received silver medal on the World Cup in the same year.

He has two younger brothers, Tamás Iváncsik and Ádám Iváncsik. Both of them are professional handball players and Hungarian internationals.

He is married. His wife, Vera gave birth to a boy, Máté, on 3 February 2009, soon after Iváncsik returned from the World Championship. Their second son, Milán was born in March 2014.

== Achievements ==
- Nemzeti Bajnokság I:
  - Winner: 2001, 2002, 2003, 2004, 2005, 2006, 2008, 2009, 2010, 2011, 2012, 2013, 2014, 2015
  - Silver Medalist: 2007
- Magyar Kupa:
  - Winner: 2002, 2003, 2004, 2005, 2007, 2009, 2010, 2011, 2012, 2013, 2014, 2015
  - Silver Medalist: 2006, 2008
- EHF Champions League:
  - Finalist: 2002, 2015, 2016
  - Semifinalist: 2003, 2006, 2014, 2017
- EHF Cup Winners' Cup:
  - Winner: 2008
- EHF Champions Trophy:
  - Finalist: 2002, 2008

== Individual awards ==
- Hungarian Handballer of the Year: 2010
- Golden Cross of the Cross of Merit of the Republic of Hungary (2012)
