= Bálint Fekete =

Hungarian handball player (born 1995)

Personal information
- Nationality: Hungarian
- Born: 27 June 1995 (age 31) Gyula, Hungary
- Height: 1.94 m (6 ft 4 in)

Sport
- Sport: Handball
- Position: Right Back/wing
- Current club: Liberbank Cuenca
- Number: 38

Senior clubs
- Years: Team
- 2011–2020: SC Pick Szeged
- 2018–2019: → BM Logroño La Rioja
- 2019–2020: → Liberbank Cuenca
- 2020–: Dabas KK
National team
Years	Team	Apps	(Gls)
2017–	Hungary	8	(4)

Bálint Fekete (born 27 June 1995) is a Hungarian handball player for Dabas KK and the Hungarian national team.

He represented Hungary at the 2020 European Men's Handball Championship.
