= Tibor Ivanišević =

Serbian handball player (born 1990)

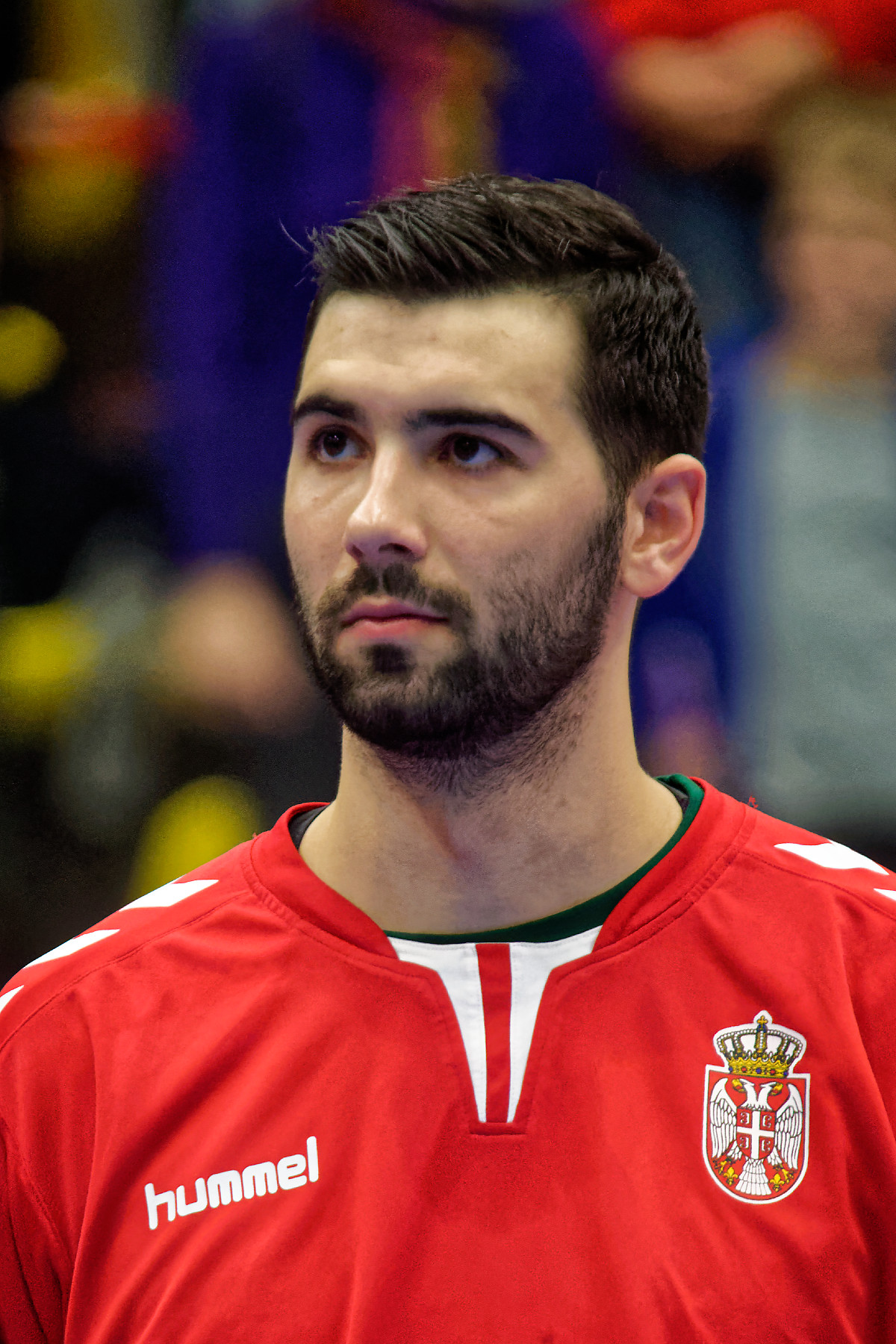
- Ivanišević in 2017

Personal information
- Full name: Tibor Ivanišević
- Nationality: Serbian
- Born: 16 August 1990 (age 36) Mostar, SR Bosnia-Herzegovina, SFR Yugoslavia
- Height: 1.97 m (6 ft 6 in)

Sport
- Sport: Handball
- Position: Goalkeeper
- Current club: VfL Gummersbach
- Number: 16

Youth career
- Years: Team
- –: Voždovac

Senior clubs
- Years: Team
- –: Voždovac
- 2010–2013: Crvena zvezda
- 2013–2015: Orosházi FKSE
- 2015–2016: Borac Banja Luka
- 2016: Gyöngyösi KK
- 2017–2018: Skjern
- 2018–2021: HSG Wetzlar
- 2021–2024: VfL Gummersbach
- 2024–: Frisch Auf Göppingen
National team
Years	Team	Apps	(Gls)
2016–	Serbia	21	(1)
Medal record
Summer Universiade
Silver medal – second place	2015 Gwangju	Team
- Updated on 26 July 2021

Tibor Ivanišević (Serbian Cyrillic: Тибор Иванишевић; born 16 August 1990) is a Serbian handball player for German club VfL Gummersbach and the Serbia national team.

== Club career ==
After starting at Voždovac, Ivanišević spent three seasons with Crvena zvezda, before moving abroad to the Hungarian side Orosházi FKSE in 2013. He would go on to play for Borac Banja Luka in the 2015–16 season.

In January 2017, Ivanišević signed with Danish club Skjern. Here he won the Danish Men's Handball Cup in 2016 and was named MVP for the tournament. He saved seven penalties in an EHF Champions League game against Motor Zaporizhzhia on 4 March 2018, helping his team qualify for the knockout stage of the competition.

== International career ==
Ivanišević won a silver medal with the Serbian team at the 2015 Summer Universiade and represented Serbia in two European Championships (2018 and 2020).

== Honours ==
Skjern

- Danish Men's Handball League: 2017–18
- Danish Men's Handball Cup: 2016
