= Yevhen Buinenko =

Ukrainian handball player

Personal information
- Nationality: Ukrainian
- Born: 20 September 1992 (age 34) Zaporizhia, Ukraine
- Height: 2.00 m (6 ft 7 in)

Sport
- Sport: Handball
- Position: Left back
- Current club: Orosházi FKSE
National team
Years	Team	Apps	(Gls)
–	Ukraine	30	(28)

Yevhen Buinenko (born 20 September 1992) is a Ukrainian handball player for Orosházi FKSE and the Ukrainian national team.

He represented Ukraine at the 2020 European Men's Handball Championship.
