= Balmazújvárosi KK =

Hungarian handball club

Kőnig-Trade Balmazújvárosi KK
- Full name: Balmazújvárosi Kézilabda Klub
- Short name: BKK
- Founded: 1958
- Arena: Kőnig Rendezvényközpont, Balmazújváros
- Capacity: 850 seats
- President: Sándor Király
- Head coach: Ferenc Füzesi
- League: NB I
- Club colours
Home	Away

Balmazújvárosi Kézilabda Klub is a Hungarian handball club from Balmazújváros, that played in the Nemzeti Bajnokság I, the top level championship in Hungary.

Location of Balmazújvárosi KK

== Crest, colours, supporters ==
=== Naming history ===
Name	Period
Balmazújvárosi TTSC	−1997
Balmazújvárosi TTSK	1997–2002
Balmaz-Metál TTSK	2002–2003
Balmazújvárosi SC	2003–2004
Balmazújvárosi KK	2004–2010
Kőnig-Trade-Balmazújvárosi KK	2010–2016
Balmazújvárosi KK	2016–present

=== Kit manufacturers and shirt sponsor ===
The following table shows in detail Balmazújvárosi Kézilabda Klub kit manufacturers and shirt sponsors by year:

Kit manufacturers

Period	Kit manufacturer
– 2016	(Germany) Erima
2016 – present	(Germany) Adidas

Shirt sponsor

Period	Sponsor
– 2015	König-Trade Kft. / Thermál Hotel Balmaz
2015–2016	König-Trade Kft. / Thermál Hotel Balmaz / Szerencsejáték Zrt.
2016–2017	tippmixPro / König-Trade Kft. / Thermál Hotel Balmaz
2017–2018	König-Trade Kft. / Thermál Hotel Balmaz
2018 – present	Balmazújváros / SzertárSport

=== Kits ===
HOME
2016–17	2017–18	2018–

AWAY
2016–17	2017–18	2018–

== Team ==
=== Current squad ===
Squad for the 2015–16 season

Goalkeepers

- 13 (Hungary) László Pajkó
- 55 (Slovakia) Teodor Paul
- (Hungary) István Bagi

Wingers

- 18 (Dominican Republic) Mateo Dioris
- 20 (Hungary) Ákos Balda
- 34 (Hungary) Imre Veres
- 66 (Serbia) Marinko Kekezović
- (Hungary) Dávid Király
- (Hungary) János Temesvári

Pivots

- 10 (Montenegro) Nebojša Simović
- 89 (Hungary) Péter István
- (Hungary) Dániel Horváth

Back players

- 5 (Serbia) Nikola Lazić
- 8 (Hungary) Ádám Korsós
- 17 (Hungary) Gábor Oláh
- 24 (Hungary) Zoltán Morva
- 33 (Bosnia and Herzegovina) Tarik Vranac
- 44 (Slovakia) Jozef Hanták
- (Hungary) Sándor Balázs

=== Staff members ===
- Head Coach: Ferenc Füzesi (HUN)
- Assistant Coach:
- Club Doctor: , MD
- Masseur:

=== Transfers ===
Transfers for the 2015–16 season

Joining

- (Slovakia) Teodor Paul (from Tatabánya)
- (Montenegro) Nebojša Simović (from Lovćen Cetinje)
- (Serbia) Marinko Kekezović (from Energia Târgu Jiu)
- (Hungary) Ákos Balda (from Nyíregyháza)
- (Hungary) Gábor Oláh (from Csurgó)
- (Hungary) Zoltán Morva (from Orosháza)
- (Slovakia) Jozef Hanták (from KP Brno)
- (Hungary) István Bagi (from )
- (Hungary) Imre Veres (from )
- (Hungary) Dávid Király (from )

Leaving

- (Hungary) Richárd Bali (to Gyöngyös)
- (Croatia) Nikola Džono (to Zagłębie Lubin)
- (Serbia) Marko Ćuruvija (to Szeged)
- (Hungary) Tamás Oláh (to PLER)
- (Slovenia) Igor Cagalj (to Maribor Branik)
- (Slovakia) Marek Kovácech (to Union Leoben)
- (Hungary) Norbert Nagy (to FTC)
- (Hungary) Tamás Hajdu (to Dabas)
- (Hungary) Zoltán Oláh (to Nyíregyháza)
- (Japan) Atsushi Mekaru (to Nyíregyháza)
- (Serbia) Nikola Knežević (to )
- (Serbia) Miloje Dolić (to )

== Previous squads ==
2016–2017 Team
Shirt No	Nationality	Player	Birth Date	Position
1	Hungary	István Bagi	23 December 1994 (age 31)	Goalkeeper
2	Spain	Marc Jordan	16 June 1995 (age 30)	Right Back
3	Montenegro	Nebojša Simović	15 November 1993 (age 32)	Line Player
6	Hungary	János Temesvári	27 February 1990 (age 36)	Left Winger
8	Hungary	Ádám Korsós	28 April 1988 (age 38)	Central Back
8	Spain	Miguel Angel Martinez	27 July 1990 (age 35)	Central Back
11	Montenegro	Stevan Vujović	7 April 1990 (age 36)	Left Back
13	Hungary	László Pajkó	13 June 1991 (age 34)	Goalkeeper
14	Serbia	Aleksandar Stojanović	22 June 1983 (age 42)	Right Back
15	Hungary	Sándor Balázs	9 July 1991 (age 34)	Left Back
16	Hungary	Imre Pásztor	23 July 1996 (age 29)	Goalkeeper
18	Dominican Republic	Mateo Dioris	6 December 1986 (age 39)	Right Winger
19	Hungary	Dávid Katzirz	25 June 1980 (age 45)	Left Back
20	Hungary	Ákos Balda	9 August 1987 (age 38)	Right Winger
21	Hungary	Dávid Deli	21 June 1997 (age 28)	Left Back
22	Serbia	Milan Rasic	16 May 1987 (age 39)	Line Player
24	Bosnia and Herzegovina	Tarik Vranac	23 December 1993 (age 32)	Left Back
30	Hungary	Richárd Bali	30 March 1989 (age 37)	Left Back
33	Belarus	Andrei Vakhnovich	13 June 1988 (age 37)	Right Back
36	Brazil	Victor Joao Perez	23 October 1989 (age 36)	Goalkeeper
44	Slovakia	Jozef Hanták	19 December 1987 (age 38)	Central Back
54	Serbia	Marko Ćuruvija	24 July 1981 (age 44)	Left Winger
55	Slovakia	Teodor Paul	22 April 1987 (age 39)	Goalkeeper
64	Serbia	Bojan Tomic	25 February 1993 (age 33)	Right Winger
66	HungarySerbia	Marinko Kekezović	20 August 1985 (age 40)	Left Winger
88	Hungary	Levente Teleki	20 July 1998 (age 27)	Line Player
96	Hungary	Ádám Gyimesi	12 February 1996 (age 30)	Left Winger

2015–2016 Team
Shirt No	Nationality	Player	Birth Date	Position
1	Hungary	István Bagi	23 December 1994 (age 31)	Goalkeeper
4	Hungary	Ádám Nagy	2 February 1993 (age 33)	Central Back
4	Sweden	Nacor Medina Perez	3 February 1988 (age 38)	Central Back
5	Serbia	Nikola Lazić	19 July 1989 (age 36)	Left Back
6	Hungary	János Temesvári	27 February 1990 (age 36)	Left Winger
8	Hungary	Ádám Korsós	28 April 1988 (age 38)	Central Back
9	Hungary	Dávid Király	31 October 1997 (age 28)	Right Winger
10	Montenegro	Nebojša Simović	15 November 1993 (age 32)	Line Player
13	Hungary	László Pajkó	13 June 1991 (age 34)	Goalkeeper
14	Serbia	Bojan Tomic	25 February 1993 (age 33)	Right Winger
15	Hungary	Sándor Balázs	9 July 1991 (age 34)	Left Back
17	Hungary	Gábor Oláh	21 January 1980 (age 46)	Right Back
18	Dominican Republic	Mateo Dioris	6 December 1986 (age 39)	Right Winger
20	Hungary	Ákos Balda	9 August 1987 (age 38)	Right Winger
24	Hungary	Zoltán Morva	29 October 1990 (age 35)	Central Back
33	Bosnia and Herzegovina	Tarik Vranac	23 December 1993 (age 32)	Left Back
44	Slovakia	Jozef Hanták	19 December 1987 (age 38)	Central Back
55	Slovakia	Teodor Paul	22 April 1987 (age 39)	Goalkeeper
66	HungarySerbia	Marinko Kekezović	20 August 1985 (age 40)	Left Winger
77	Hungary	Dániel Horváth	16 December 1995 (age 30)	Line Player
89	Hungary	Péter István	6 April 1989 (age 37)	Line Player

2014–2015 Team
Shirt No	Nationality	Player	Birth Date	Position
3	Japan	Atsushi Mekaru	3 April 1985 (age 41)	Central Back
6	Hungary	János Temesvári	27 February 1990 (age 36)	Left Winger
7	Bosnia and Herzegovina	Nikola Džono	14 January 1986 (age 40)	Right Back
8	Hungary	Ádám Korsós	28 April 1988 (age 38)	Central Back
9	Hungary	Norbert Nagy	9 March 1991 (age 35)	Right Winger
12	Hungary	Zoltán Oláh	11 October 1991 (age 34)	Goalkeeper
13	Hungary	Áron Füleki	10 February 1989 (age 37)	Line Player
14	Hungary	Tamás Oláh	14 February 1993 (age 33)	Right Back
15	Hungary	Sándor Balázs	9 July 1991 (age 34)	Left Back
16	Croatia	Nikola Knežević	3 January 1983 (age 43)	Goalkeeper
17	Hungary	Zsolt Heiczinger	24 March 1988 (age 38)	Line Player
18	Dominican Republic	Mateo Dioris	6 December 1986 (age 39)	Right Winger
24	Hungary	Csaba Minegász	18 July 1994 (age 31)	Left Winger
25	Slovakia	Marek Kovácech	25 January 1989 (age 37)	Right Back
30	Hungary	Richárd Bali	30 March 1989 (age 37)	Left Back
33	Bosnia and Herzegovina	Tarik Vranac	23 December 1993 (age 32)	Left Back
34	Hungary	Márió Horvácki	15 February 1994 (age 32)	Central Back
44	Hungary	Tamás Hajdu	25 November 1992 (age 33)	Central Back
54	Serbia	Marko Ćuruvija	24 July 1981 (age 44)	Left Winger
55	Hungary	László Pajkó	13 June 1991 (age 34)	Goalkeeper
66	Hungary	Ádám Salamon	30 November 1987 (age 38)	Central Back
77	Hungary	Dániel Horváth	16 December 1995 (age 30)	Line Player
88	Serbia	Miloje Dolić	14 June 1993 (age 32)	Central Back
89	Hungary	Péter István	6 April 1989 (age 37)	Line Player

== Honours ==
Honours		No.	Years
League
Nemzeti Bajnokság I/B	Winners	1	2013–14
Nemzeti Bajnokság I/B	Runners-up	1	2012–13
Nemzeti Bajnokság I/B	Third Place	1	2017–18

== Recent seasons ==
As of 1 November 2017.

- Seasons in Nemzeti Bajnokság I: 3
- Seasons in Nemzeti Bajnokság I/B: 7
- Seasons in Nemzeti Bajnokság II: 22

Season	Division	Pos.	Magyar kupa
1958	District		Did not held
1959	District		Did not held
1960	District		Did not held
1961	District	1st	Did not held
1962	County I		Did not held
1963	County I		
1964	County I		
1965	County I		
1966	County I		
1967	County I	1st	
1968	County I		
1969	County I		

Season	Division	Pos.	Magyar kupa
1970	County I		
1971	County I		
1972	County I		
1973	County I		
1974	County I		
1975	County I		Did not held
1976	County I		
1977	County I		
1978	County I		
1979	County I		
1980	County I		
1981	County I		

Season	Division	Pos.	Magyar kupa
1982	County I		
1983	County I		*
1984	County I		
1985	County I	1st	
1986	NB II Kelet	5th	
1987	NB II Kelet	1st	
1988	NB I/B	14th	
1989–90	NB II Kelet	3rd	
1990–91	NB I/B Kelet	12th	
1991–92	NB II Északkelet	4th	
1992–93	NB II Északkelet	1st	

- 1983 Magyar kupa (December):
- 1988–89 Magyar kupa:

Season	Division	Pos.	Magyar kupa
1993–94	NB II Északkelet	2nd	
1994–95	NB II Északkelet	3rd	
1995–96	NB II Északkelet	3rd	
1996–97	NB II Északkelet	4th	
1997–98	NB II Északkelet	5th	
1998–99	NB II Északkelet	5th	
1999-00	NB II Északkelet	3rd	
2000–01	NB II Északkelet	8th	
2001–02	NB II Északkelet	3rd	
2002–03	NB II Északkelet	3rd	

Season	Division	Pos.	Magyar kupa
2003–04	NB II Északkelet	5th	
2004–05	NB II Északkelet	5th	
2005–06	NB II Északkelet	8th	
2006–07	NB II Északkelet	4th	
2007–08	NB II Északkelet	7th	
2008–09	NB II Északkelet	9th	
2009–10	NB II Északkelet	4th	
2010–11	NB I/B Kelet	8th	Round 2
2011–12	NB I/B Kelet	5th	Round 4
2012–13	NB I/B Kelet	2nd	Round 4

Season	Division	Pos.	Magyar kupa
2013–14	NB I/B Kelet	1st	Round 4
2014–15	NB I	11th	Round 3
2015–16	NB I	7th	Round 3
2016–17	NB I	13th	Round 2
2017–18	NB I/B Kelet	3rd	Round 4
2018–19	NB I/B Kelet	7th	Round 3
2019–20	NB I/B Kelet	Cancelled	
2020–21	County I	2nd	
2021–22	County I	1th	
2022–23	NB II Északkelet	9st	
2023–24	NB II Északkelet		

== Former club members ==
=== Notable former players ===
- (Hungary) Ákos Doros
- (Hungary) Péter Gúnya
- (Hungary) Dávid Katzirz
- (Hungary) (Serbia) Marinko Kekezović
- (Hungary) Gábor Oláh
- (Bosnia and Herzegovina) Tarik Vranac
- (Belarus) Andrei Vakhnovich
- (Brazil) Victor Joao Perez
- (Croatia) Nikola Džono
- (Croatia) Nikola Knežević
- (Dominican Republic) Mateo Dioris
- (Spain) Marc Jordan
- (Spain) Miguel Angel Martinez
- (Japan) Atsushi Mekaru
- (Montenegro) Nebojša Simović
- (Montenegro) Stevan Vujović
- (Slovenia) Igor Cagalj
- (Serbia) Marko Ćuruvija (2014–2015, 2017–2018)
- (Serbia) Miloje Dolić
- (Serbia) Nikola Lazić
- (Serbia) Darko Pavlović
- (Serbia) Milan Rasic
- (Serbia) Aleksandar Stojanović
- (Serbia) Bojan Tomic
- (Slovakia) Jozef Hanták
- (Slovakia) Marek Kovácech
- (Slovakia) Teodor Paul
- (Sweden) Nacor Medina Perez
