= Stevan Vujović =

Montenegrin handball player (born 1990)

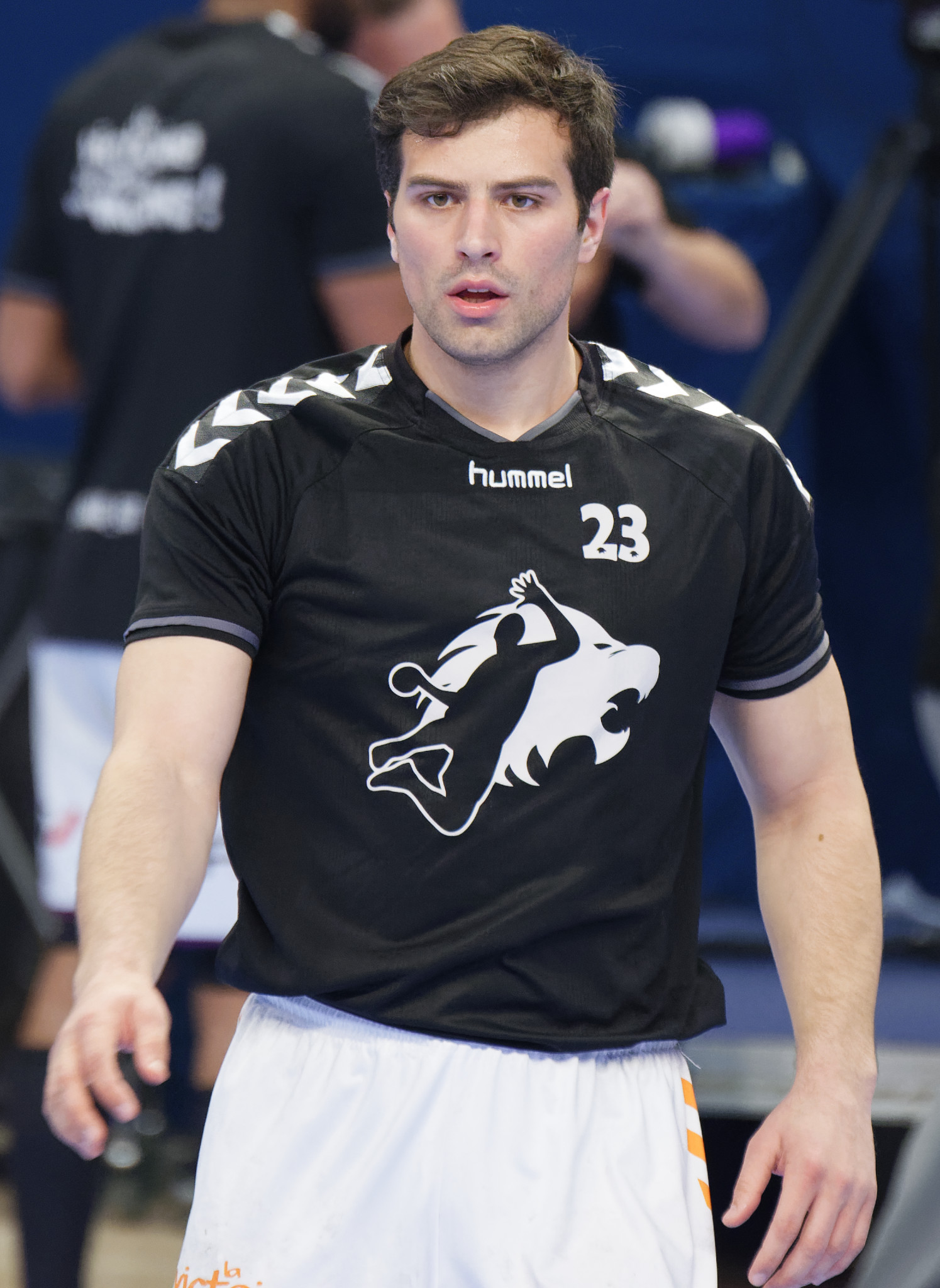
- Vujović in 2015

Personal information
- Full name: Stevan Vujović
- Nationality: Montenegrin
- Born: 7 April 1990 (age 36) Cetinje, SR Montenegro, Yugoslavia
- Height: 1.92 m (6 ft 4 in)

Sport
- Sport: Handball
- Position: Left back
- Current club: Al Nasr Club
- Number: 11

Youth career
- Years: Team
- –: Cepelin

Senior clubs
- Years: Team
- 2007–2009: Vardar
- 2009–2010: Crvena zvezda
- 2010–2011: Antequera
- 2011–2012: Vardar
- 2012–2013: Lovćen
- 2013–2015: Sélestat
- 2015: HSG Wetzlar
- 2015: Amicitia Zürich
- 2016: Metalurg Skopje
- 2016: Balmazújvárosi
- 2017–2019: Dobrogea Sud Constanța
- 2019–2020: Motor Zaporizhzhia
- 2020–2021: Al Rayyan
- 2021: Kuwait SC
- 2021–2024: Minaur Baia Mare
National team
Years	Team	Apps	(Gls)
2009–	Montenegro	56	(112)

Stevan Vujović (born 7 April 1990) is a Montenegrin handball player for Al Nasr Club and the Montenegro national team.

== Club career ==
Over the course of his career, Vujović played for Vardar (two spells), Crvena zvezda, Antequera, Lovćen, Sélestat, HSG Wetzlar, GC Amicitia Zürich, Metalurg Skopje, Balmazújvárosi KK, Dobrogea Sud Constanța, Motor Zaporizhzhia, Al Rayyan, Kuwait SC, Minaur Baia Mare and Partizan.

== International career ==
At international level, Vujović represented Montenegro in four major tournaments, including three European Championships (2014, 2018 and 2020).

== Honours ==
Vardar

- Macedonian Handball Super League: 2008–09
- Macedonian Handball Cup: 2007–08

Partizan

- Serbian Championship: 2024–25
