= Marko Tarabochia =

Croatian-born Bosnian handball player

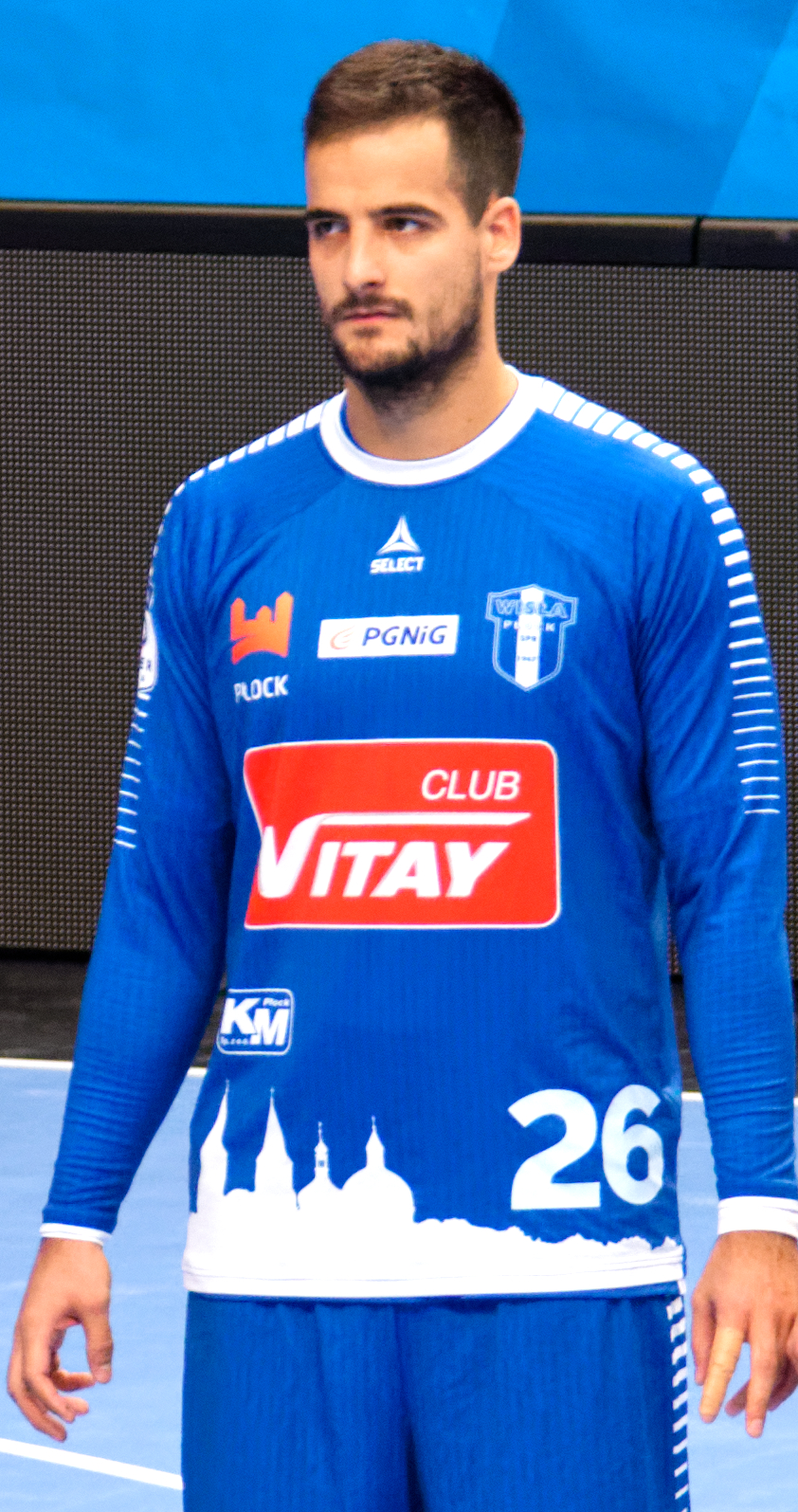

Personal information
- Nationality: Croatian / Bosnian
- Born: 28 November 1988 (age 37) Zagreb, SFR Yugoslavia
- Height: 1.93 m (6 ft 4 in)

Sport
- Sport: Handball
- Position: Centre back
- Current club: Fejér B.Á.L. Veszprém
- Number: 26

Senior clubs
- Years: Team
- 2010–2011: RK Zagreb
- 2011–2013: RK Maribor Branik
- 2013–2015: KS Azoty-Puławy
- 2015–2019: Wisła Płock
- 2019: MRK Sesvete
- 2019–2020: Csurgói KK
- 2020–2021: RK Metalurg Skopje
- 2021–2023: Dabas KK
- 2023–2024: Fejér B.Á.L. Veszprém
- 2024–: RK Metković
National team
Years	Team	Apps	(Gls)
2015–	Bosnia and Herzegovina	17	(32)

Marko Tarabochia (born 28 November 1988) is a Croatian-born Bosnian handball player for Fejér B.Á.L. Veszprém and the Bosnian national team.
