= Mihály Iváncsik =

Hungarian handball player (born 1959)

Medal record

Representing Hungary

Men's Handball

World Championship
Silver medal – second place	1986 Switzerland	Team

Mihály Iváncsik (born 9 July 1959 in Máriapócs) is a Hungarian former handball player. He played in right wing position and was known of his tricky, screwed shots.

== Career ==
=== Club ===
He started to play handball for his local club Nyírbátor. His talent was spotted early and many clubs have been interested in signing him, including Szegedi Volán SC, Budapest Honvéd SE and Győri Rába ETO. He has finally chosen the Győr-based team and made his senior debut for his new club in 1980 against Tatabánya. He became one of the most renowned players for the late eighties and early nineties in Hungary, and has won three consecutive Hungarian Championship titles between 1987 and 1990 with Rába ETO. In addition, he has won the IHF Cup in 1986, after beating Alicante in the finals. His outstanding performances earned him the Hungarian Handballer of the Year award in 1989.

Later, he tried his luck abroad, having played two seasons in Graz and another couple of years in Günzburg. After returned to Hungary, he played for Dunaferr SE and Tatabánya in the top level championship, and went on practising handball in lower level leagues until his retirement in 2009. He played for second division club Pápa till 2004, when he switched to third division team Komáromi AC. Close to 50, he scored over five goals a match in average for the Danube-side.

=== International ===
He was capped 165 times for Hungary and has won silver medal on the 1986 World Championship. He was fourth placed on the 1988 Olympic Games and seventh on the 1992 Olympic Games. He also played on the 1990 World Championship. He has been picked for the World Selection and the Europe Selection several times between 1989 and 1991.

== Personal ==
He has three sons, Gergő Iváncsik, Tamás Iváncsik and Ádám Iváncsik. All of them are professional handball players and Hungarian internationals.

He is working for a multinational company in Győr and is a member of the management committee of his old club, ETO-SZESE Győr FKC.

== Individual awards ==
- Hungarian Handballer of the Year: 1989
- Best right wing of the 1988 Olympic Games
