= ETO-SZESE Győr FKC =

Hungarian handball club

Győri ETO-UNI FKC
- Full name: Győri Egyetértés Torna Osztály-UNI Férfi Kézilabda Club
- Short name: ETO
- Founded: 1948
- Arena: Magvassy Mihály Sportcsarnok, Győr
- Capacity: 2,800
- Head coach: Zsolt Kopornyik
- League: Nemzeti Bajnokság I
- Club colours
Home	Away

Győri ETO-UNI FKC is a Hungarian handball male team from Győr, that plays in the Nemzeti Bajnokság I, the top level championship in Hungary.

Location of Győri ETO-UNI FKC

== History ==
The Győr ETO was founded in 1904. The club's handball department was founded in 1948. He first appeared among the best in the Nemzeti Bajnokság I in 1959 and, except for one year in 2003, he was always a member of the first class. They won a bronze medal in 1960 and a silver medal in 1961 in Nemzeti Bajnokság I. In 1962, ETO finished in fifth place. The following year (1963) brought another podium place, the team finished third. In 1964, ETO finished last, in 14th place, and was relegated from the first division. In 1965, the band immediately returned to the top, winning the second division with a 6-point lead. In 1970, the team won a silver medal in the Hungarian Cup, losing 16:13 to Spartacus in the final. Coach Attila Joósz led the team to the top in 1973: in addition to the second place in the championship, ETO won the Hungarian Cup. The team composed of József Horváth, Gyula Böröczki, Károly Visi, Imre Balogh, Lajos Cséka, László Samodai, József Pálmai, Lajos Horváth, György Szórádi, László Pelikán, András Kristofori, György Gyömörei made history. The returning coach Attila Joósz once again led the team to the top in 1985: in addition to the bronze medal won in the championship, ETO won the Hungarian Cup again. The members of the team were: Imre Balogh, Béla Cseh, Ottó Csicsay, István Deáki, Attila Domonkos, Zsolt Horváth, Mihály Iváncsik, Zoltán Kádár, Tibor Oross, László Polgár, László Tóth, Zoltán Vesztergom and József Vura. ETO started in the 1985/86 season for the first time in an international cup: the IHF Cup and won it right away. In the final, the opponent was the Spanish Tecnisa Alicante, the 6-goal advantage gained at home was preserved in the second leg (23:17, 20:24), so the ETO (Imre Balogh, Béla Cseh, Ottó Csicsay, István Deáki, Attila Domonkos, Zsolt Horváth, Mihály Iváncsik, Zoltán Kádár, Tamás Menyhért, Tibor Oross, László Polgár, László Tóth and Zoltán Vesztergom) became the second team in the history of Hungarian men's handball to win the European Cup. They won the Hungarian Cup this year as well. In 1987, the dream came true, ETO became the champion. The team confidently finished in first place with a 6-point advantage. Zoltán Kádár scored 167 goals, Mihály Iváncsik 126. Members of the gold medal winning team: Imre Balogh, Péter Cseri, Ottó Csicsay, István Deáki, Attila Domonkos, Kálmán Fenyő, Zsolt Horváth, Mihály Iváncsik, Zoltán Kádár, Tamás Menyhért, Tibor Oross, László Polgár, Attila Szekér, László Tóth, Zoltán Zoltán Vesztergom. In 1987, they won the Hungarian Cup for the third time in a row under the leadership of coach Tibor Szaló. After 1987, they won the Nemzeti Bajnokság I for the third time in a row in the 1988/89 and 1989/90 seasons. The team won a bronze medal in the 1991/92 season, and a silver medal in the Hungarian Cup in 1995, but from then on the team slipped further down the table. The year 2003 was not successful, the team dropped out of the league and only played in the county championship. The team was re-formed with the support of Széchenyi István University. In 2006, the team was again promoted to Nemzeti Bajnokság II. In the 2010/11 season, they successfully overcame the obstacles and won the Nemzeti Bajnokság II championship. The following year, the team finished in 2nd place in the NB I/B championship. The 2012-2013 championship year followed, when they won the NB I/B. This gave them the right to participate in Nemzeti Bajnokság I. The summer of 2013 brought the biggest change in the life of the team, as they acquired the right to use the name ETO, so they started the 2013-2014 season under the name ETO-SZESE Győr in September, which did not bring much success, so the following season was changed to the 2014-15 they started the season again in the NB I/B. After several silver medals, at the end of the 2023/24 season, the team won gold again in the NB I/B and was promoted to the Nemzeti Bajnokság I.

== Crest, colours, supporters ==
=== Naming history ===
Name	Period
SZESE Győr	1974–2013
ETO-SZESE Győr	2013–2017
Agrofeed ETO-SZESE Győr	2017–2022
Agrofeed ETO UNI Győr	2022–

=== Kit manufacturers and shirt sponsor ===
The following table shows in detail ETO-SZESE Győr kit manufacturers and shirt sponsors by year:

Kit manufacturers

Period	Kit manufacturer
2011–2014	(Italy) Mass
2014–2023	(Germany) Jako
2023–present	(Japan) Mizuno

Shirt sponsor

Period	Sponsor
2012–2014	Árkád Győr
2014–2015	Buda-Cash / Árkád Győr
2015–2016	Árkád Győr / KPMG
2016–2018	Agrofeed / Árkád Győr
2018–2019	Agrofeed / Széchenyi István Egyetem
2019 – present	Agrofeed / MB Invest Group

=== Kits ===
HOME
2013–14	2014–15	2015–16	2016–17	2018–20	2020–21	2021–22	2022–23

AWAY
2013–14	2016–17	2018–19	2019–20	2020–21	2021–22	2022–23

THIRD

2016–17

== Sports Hall information ==
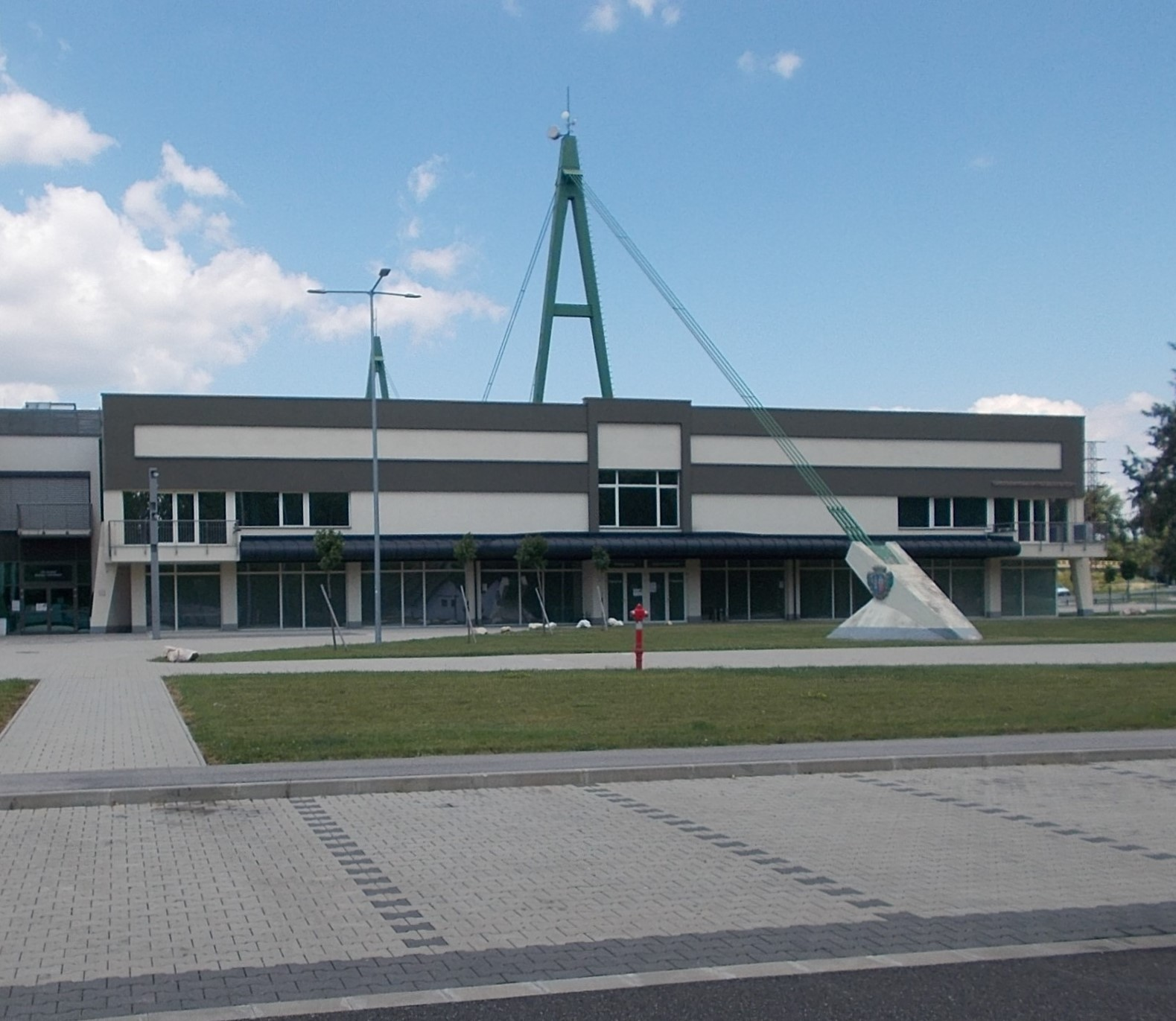
Home hall: Magvassy Mihály Sportcsarnok

- Name: – Magvassy Mihály Sportcsarnok
- City: – Győr
- Capacity: – 2800
- Address: – 9027 Győr, Kiskút liget (ETO Park mögött)

== Management ==
Position	Name
President	(Hungary) Károly Auer
Executive Director	(Hungary) Rita Uhlig
Operative Director	(Hungary) Fruzsina Farkas-Kulin
Technical Manager	(Hungary) Mátyás Sövegjártó
Head Of Communications	(Hungary) Sarolta Pulai
Marketing And PR Manager	(Hungary) Nóra Pintér
Sports employee	(Hungary) Erhard Sisa

== Team ==
=== Current squad ===
Squad for the 2026–27 season

Győri ETO-UNI FKC

Goalkeepers

- 16 (Hungary) Imre Pásztor (c)
- 20 (Hungary) Ádám Borbély
- 67 (Hungary) Kristóf Győri

Left Wingers

- 15 (Hungary) Levente Hári
- 88 (Hungary) Bence Krakovszki

Right Wingers

- 10 (Hungary) Zsolt Krakovszki
- 19 (Hungary) Martin Nagy

Line Players

- 9 (Croatia) Tomislav Kušan
- 56 (Hungary) Levente Szrnka
- 71 (Hungary) Zalán Zakor
- 99 (Hungary) Dániel Füzi

Left Backs

- 2 (Montenegro) Miloš Božović
- 11 (Montenegro) Radojica Čepić
- 22 (Hungary) Mátyás Győri
- 79 (Hungary) Tamás Kovács

Central Backs

- 4 (Hungary) Máté Szmetán
- 24 (Hungary) Marko Eklemović
- 77 (Hungary) Alex Bognár

Right Backs

- 7 (Croatia) Luka Stepančić
- 30 (Japan) Yuga Enomoto
- 38 (Hungary) Márton Dely

=== Technical staff ===
- Head coach: (Hungary) Zsolt Kopornyik
- Assistant coach: (Hungary) Bence Mikita
- Goalkeeping coach: (Hungary) Ádám Somogyi
- Fitness coach: Dániel Lattenstein
- Physiotherapist: (Hungary) Szabolcs Burdi
- Club doctor: (Hungary) Dr. Levente Tóth
- Club doctor: (Hungary) Dr. László Szálasy

=== Transfers ===
Transfers for the 2026–27 season

Joining

- (Montenegro) Radojica Čepić (LB) from (Switzerland) HC Kriens-Luzern
- (Japan) Yuga Enomoto (RB) from (Serbia) RK Vojvodina
- (Hungary) Bence Krakovszki (LW) from (Hungary) MOL Tatabánya KC
- (Hungary) Ádám Borbély (GK) from (Hungary) Ferencvárosi TC
- (Hungary) Mátyás Győri (LB) from (Hungary) Ferencvárosi TC
- (Hungary) Kristóf Győri (GK) from (Hungary) Ferencvárosi TC
- (Hungary) Dániel Füzi (LP) from (Hungary) Ferencvárosi TC
- (Hungary) Alex Bognár (CB) from (Slovenia) RK Celje
- (Hungary) Tamás Kovács (LB) from (Hungary) NEKA
- (Hungary) Marko Eklemović (CB) on loan from (Hungary) OTP Bank – Pick Szeged

Leaving

- (Germany) Christian Dissinger (LB) to (Kuwait) Kazma SC
- (Denmark) Loke Peter Brasen (GK) to (Denmark) Rækker Mølle Håndbold
- (Hungary) Balázs Szöllősi (CB) to (Hungary) HE-DO B. Braun Gyöngyös
- (Hungary) Marko Eklemović (CB) to (Hungary) OTP Bank – Pick Szeged
- (Hungary) Uroš Vilovski (LP)
- (Bosnia and Herzegovina) Mislav Grgić (CB)
- (Hungary) Márkó Tárnoki (LW) to (Hungary) NEKA

=== Transfer History ===
Transfers for the 2025–26 season

Joining

- (Croatia) Luka Stepančić (RB) from (Poland) Wisła Płock
- (Germany) Christian Dissinger (LB) from (Hungary) MOL Tatabánya KC
- (Croatia) Tomislav Kušan (LP) from (France) Limoges Handball
- (Denmark) Loke Peter Brasen (GK) from (Norway) Kristiansand Topphåndball
- (Hungary) Zsolt Krakovszki (RW) from (Germany) HSG Wetzlar
- (Hungary) Balázs Szöllősi (CB) from (Hungary) Balatonfüredi KSE
- (Hungary) Levente Szrnka (LP) from (Hungary) Carbonex-Komló
- (Hungary) Márkó Tárnoki (LW) from (Hungary) NEKA
- (Hungary) Zalán Zakor (LP) from (Hungary) NEKA
- (Hungary) Marko Eklemović (CB) from (Hungary) MOL Tatabánya KC
- (Hungary) Péter Csányi (GK) back from loan at (Hungary) OTP-Bank Pick Szeged U21
- (Hungary) Máté Szmetán (CB) from (Hungary) Balatonfüredi KSE
- (Bosnia and Herzegovina) Mislav Grgić (CB) from (Croatia) RK Nexe Našice

Leaving

- (Hungary) Zsolt Balogh (RB) (retires)
- (Hungary) Huba Vajda (LP) to (Hungary) MOL Tatabánya KC
- (Hungary) Dániel Bősz (GK) to (Hungary) PLER-Budapest
- (Hungary) Balázs Laurinyecz (LW) to (Hungary) Dabas KK
- (Hungary) Gellért Ásványi (LP) to (Hungary) Dabas KK
- (Hungary) István Mátés (CB) to (Hungary) Budakalász FKC
- (Hungary) Borisz Dörnyei (RW) to (Hungary) QHB-Eger
- (Hungary) Kristóf Sikler (RB) to (Hungary) QHB-Eger
- (Hungary) Zalán Lang (LB) to (Hungary) HE-DO B. Braun Gyöngyös
- (Hungary) Péter Csányi (GK) on loan at (Hungary) OTP-Bank Pick Szeged U21
- (Hungary) Tibor Gerdán (LP)
- (Hungary) Máté Fazekas (LB) to (Hungary) OTP-Bank Pick Szeged
- (Hungary) Zalán Zakor (LP) on loan at (Hungary) Budakalász FKC
- (Poland) Patryk Pieczonka (LB) on loan at (Hungary) Budakalász FKC
- (Slovenia) Dean Bombač (CB) to (Germany) SC DHfK Leipzig

Transfers for the 2024–25 season

Joining

- (Slovenia) Dean Bombač (CB) from (Hungary) SC Pick Szeged
- (Montenegro) Miloš Božović (LB) from (France) US Ivry Handball
- (Poland) Patryk Pieczonka (LB) from (Poland) Wybrzeże Gdańsk
- (Hungary) Zsolt Balogh (RB) from (Hungary) Ferencvárosi TC
- (Hungary) Uroš Vilovski (LP) from (Hungary) MOL Tatabánya KC
- (Hungary) Huba Vajda (LP) from (Hungary) MOL Tatabánya KC
- (Hungary) Dániel Bősz (GK) from (Hungary) Balatonfüredi KSE
- (Hungary) Levente Hári (LW) from (Hungary) Fejér B.Á.L. Veszprém
- (Hungary) Máté Fazekas (LB) from (Hungary) Fejér B.Á.L. Veszprém
- (Hungary) Balázs Laurinyecz (LW) from (Hungary) Dabas KK
- (Hungary) Márton Dely (RB) from (Hungary) NEKA
- (Hungary) Kristóf Sikler (RB) from (Hungary) NEKA
- (Hungary) Péter Csányi (GK) from (Hungary) NEKA
- (Hungary) Borisz Dörnyei (RW) from (Serbia) RK Dinamo Pančevo

Leaving

- (Hungary) Mátyás Sövegjártó (RB) (retires)
- (Hungary) Máté Kurucz (RB) to (Hungary) Debreceni EAC
- (Hungary) Zsolt Radvánszki (LP) to (Hungary) Debreceni EAC
- (Hungary) Ádám Szabó (RW) to (Hungary) Békési FKC
- (Hungary) István Varga (GK) to (Hungary) Ceglédi KKSE
- (Hungary) Márton Szabados (LW) to (Hungary) Szigetszentmiklósi KSK
- (Hungary) Olivér Paár (LW)
- (Hungary) Ádám Sokoray (CB)
- (Hungary) Bence Takács (CB)
- (Hungary) Bence Bali (LP) loan back to (Hungary) NEKA
- (Hungary) Sándor Kathi (RB) loan back to (Hungary) NEKA

== Previous squads ==
2017–2018 Team
Shirt No	Nationality	Player	Birth Date	Position
1	Hungary	László Nahaj	20 February 1988 (age 38)	Goalkeeper
2	Hungary	András Szabó	18 October 1983 (age 43)	Right Back
3	Hungary	Viktor Bella	15 March 1988 (age 38)	Line Player
4	Hungary	Ádám Sokoray	16 March 1995 (age 31)	Central Back
5	Hungary	Renátó Molnár	29 December 1999 (age 26)	Line Player
6	Hungary	Dániel Kőhalmi	30 November 1988 (age 37)	Left Back
7	Hungary	Dávid Győri-Dani	13 July 1994 (age 32)	Right Back
8	Hungary	Kristóf Goór	29 October 1995 (age 31)	Line Player
9	Hungary	Tamás Iváncsik	3 April 1983 (age 43)	Right Winger
10	Hungary	László Kovácsovics	4 January 1986 (age 40)	Left Back
14	Hungary	Olivér Gyűrű	29 August 1998 (age 28)	Left Back
15	Hungary	Benedek Farkas	7 August 1999 (age 27)	Central Back
16	Hungary	Dávid Pulai	9 August 1992 (age 34)	Goalkeeper
17	Hungary	Ákos Farkas	14 November 1997 (age 28)	Right Back
19	Hungary	Máté Karajz	13 March 1996 (age 30)	Left Winger
22	Hungary	Miklós Schneider	22 March 1989 (age 37)	Central Back
24	Hungary	Péter Hollós	30 November 1996 (age 29)	Left Winger
25	Hungary	Márk Papp	29 May 1985 (age 41)	Right Winger
27	Hungary	Olivér Paár	30 December 1988 (age 37)	Left Winger
44	Hungary	Gábor Pordán	6 April 1994 (age 32)	Right Back

2013–2014 Team
Shirt No	Nationality	Player	Birth Date	Position
1	Slovenia	Gregor Lorger	7 September 1981 (age 45)	Goalkeeper
2	Hungary	András Szabó	18 October 1983 (age 43)	Right Back
4	Hungary	Ádám Sokoray	16 March 1995 (age 31)	Central Back
5	Hungary	Gábor Németh	29 April 1990 (age 36)	Right Back
7	Serbia	Živan Pešić	7 July 1993 (age 33)	Line Player
8	Hungary	Alex Gubó	19 April 1991 (age 35)	Left Back
9	Hungary	Zoltán Terenyi	16 November 1991 (age 34)	Right Winger
10	Portugal	Filipe Mota	7 May 1984 (age 42)	Central Back
14	Hungary	László Kalmár	7 November 1988 (age 37)	Left Winger
15	Hungary	Viktor Rivnyák	6 March 1991 (age 35)	Line Player
16	Hungary	Ádám Somogyi	13 February 1991 (age 35)	Goalkeeper
18	Spain	Hugo Garza Hernandez	1 April 1984 (age 42)	Left Winger
19	Hungary	Levente Halász	24 July 1988 (age 38)	Left Back
24	Hungary	Kristóf Gál	20 November 1993 (age 32)	Central Back
25	Hungary	Ádám Gebhardt	25 October 1988 (age 38)	Right Winger
33	Hungary	Bence Simon	4 December 1988 (age 37)	Central Back
45	Hungary	Miklós Rosta	31 July 1969 (age 57)	Line Player
99	Hungary	Emil Tóth	30 December 1988 (age 37)	Line Player

== Honours ==
Honours	No.	Years
League
Nemzeti Bajnokság I/B Winners	1	2012–13
Nemzeti Bajnokság I/B Runners-up	4	2011–12, 2016–17, 2017–18, 2018–19

=== Season to season ===
As of 08/07/2025

- Seasons in Nemzeti Bajnokság I: 17
- Seasons in Nemzeti Bajnokság I/B: 13

Season	Tier	Division	Place	Magyar Kupa
2006–07	3	NB II Északnyugat	11th	
2007–08	3	NB II Északnyugat	12th	
2008–09	4	MB I Győr-Moson-Sopron	2nd	
2009–10	3	NB II Északnyugat	4th	
2010–11	3	NB II Északnyugat	1st	
2011–12	2	NB I/B Nyugat	2nd	
2012–13	2	NB I/B Nyugat	1st	
2013–14	1	NB I	12th	
2014–15	2	NB I/B Nyugat	12th	
2015–16	2	NB I/B Nyugat	4th	Round 3
2016–17	2	NB I/B Nyugat	2nd	Round 2
2017–18	2	NB I/B Nyugat	2nd	Round 3
2018–19	2	NB I/B Nyugat	2nd	Round 4
2019–20	1	NB I/B Nyugat	Cancelled due COVID-19	
2020–21	2	NB I/B Nyugat	8th	Round 2
2021–22	2	NB I/B	13th	
2022–23	2	NB I/B	3rd	
2023–24	2	NB I/B	1st	
2024–25	1	NB I	6th	Round 5
2025–26	1	NB I		

== Former club members ==
=== Notable former players ===
- (Hungary) Bence Bánhidi (2007–2011)
- (Hungary) Gábor Herbert (2001–2005)
- (Hungary) Péter Hornyák (2008–2010)
- (Hungary) József Horváth (1964–1966, 1971–1974)
- (Hungary) Gergő Iváncsik (1995–2000)
- (Hungary) Mihály Iváncsik (1980–1994)
- (Hungary) Tamás Iváncsik (1999–2003, 2017–2019)
- (Hungary) Bence Krakovszki (2014–2017)
- (Hungary) Zsolt Krakovszki (2014–2017)
- (Hungary) Miklós Rosta (1987–1997, 2012–2015)
- (Hungary) Timuzsin Schuch (2005–2007)
- (Hungary) Gábor Szalafai (2003–2007)
- (Hungary) István Székely (2007–2009)
- (Hungary) Péter Tatai (2001–2005)
- (Spain) (Cuba) Julio Fis (1997–1998)
