= Ivan Milas (handballer) =

Bosnian-Herzegovinian handball player (born 1992)

Personal information
- Born: October 15, 1992 (age 34) Metković, Croatia
- Height: 1.98 m (6 ft 6 in)

Sport
- Sport: Handball
- Position: Left back
- Current club: Gwardia Opole on loan from Wisla Plock
- Number: 23
National team
| Years | Team | Apps | (Gls) |
| – | Bosnia and Herzegovina | 10 | (14) |
- Updated on 14.1.2015.

Ivan Milas (born October 15, 1992, in Metković) is a Bosnian-Herzegovinian handball player who currently plays the polish club Gwardia Opole on loan from polish club Wisla Plock. He is also member of the Bosnia and Herzegovina national football team. Milas is a left back. He previously played for Izviđač and Borac Banja Luka.
