= Marinko Kekezović =

Serbian-Hungarian handball player (born 1985)

Personal information
- Full name: Marinko Kekezović
- Nationality: Serbian / Hungarian
- Born: 20 August 1985 (age 41) Novi Sad, SFR Yugoslavia
- Height: 1.87 m (6 ft 2 in)

Sport
- Sport: Handball
- Position: Left wing
- Current club: Dabas
- Number: 6

Youth career
- Years: Team
- –: Sintelon

Senior clubs
- Years: Team
- 2003–2008: Sintelon
- 2008–2010: Kecskemét
- 2010–2011: Tatabánya
- 2011: Pécs
- 2012: Orosházi FKSE
- 2012–2014: Pick Szeged
- 2014–2015: Pandurii Târgu Jiu
- 2015–2017: Balmazújvárosi KK
- 2017–2021: Dabas
National team
- Years: Team
- –: Serbia

Teams managed
- 2022–: MTK Budapest U21
Medal record
Men's handball
Representing Serbia and Montenegro
U21 World Championship
Silver medal – second place	2005 Hungary	Team

Marinko Kekezović (Serbian Cyrillic: Маринко Кекезовић; born 20 August 1985) is a Serbian-Hungarian handball player for Hungarian club Dabas.

== Career ==
After playing for five years with Sintelon (later known as Tarkett), Kekezović moved to Hungary and joined Kecskemét in 2008. He also played for fellow Hungarian teams Tatabánya, Pécs, Orosházi FKSE and Pick Szeged, before moving to Romanian club Pandurii Târgu Jiu in 2014.

In August 2005, Kekezović represented Serbia and Montenegro at the World Under-21 Championship, as the team finished as runners-up.

== Honours ==
Pick Szeged

- EHF Cup: 2013–14
