= Tamás Iváncsik =

Hungarian handball player (born 1983)

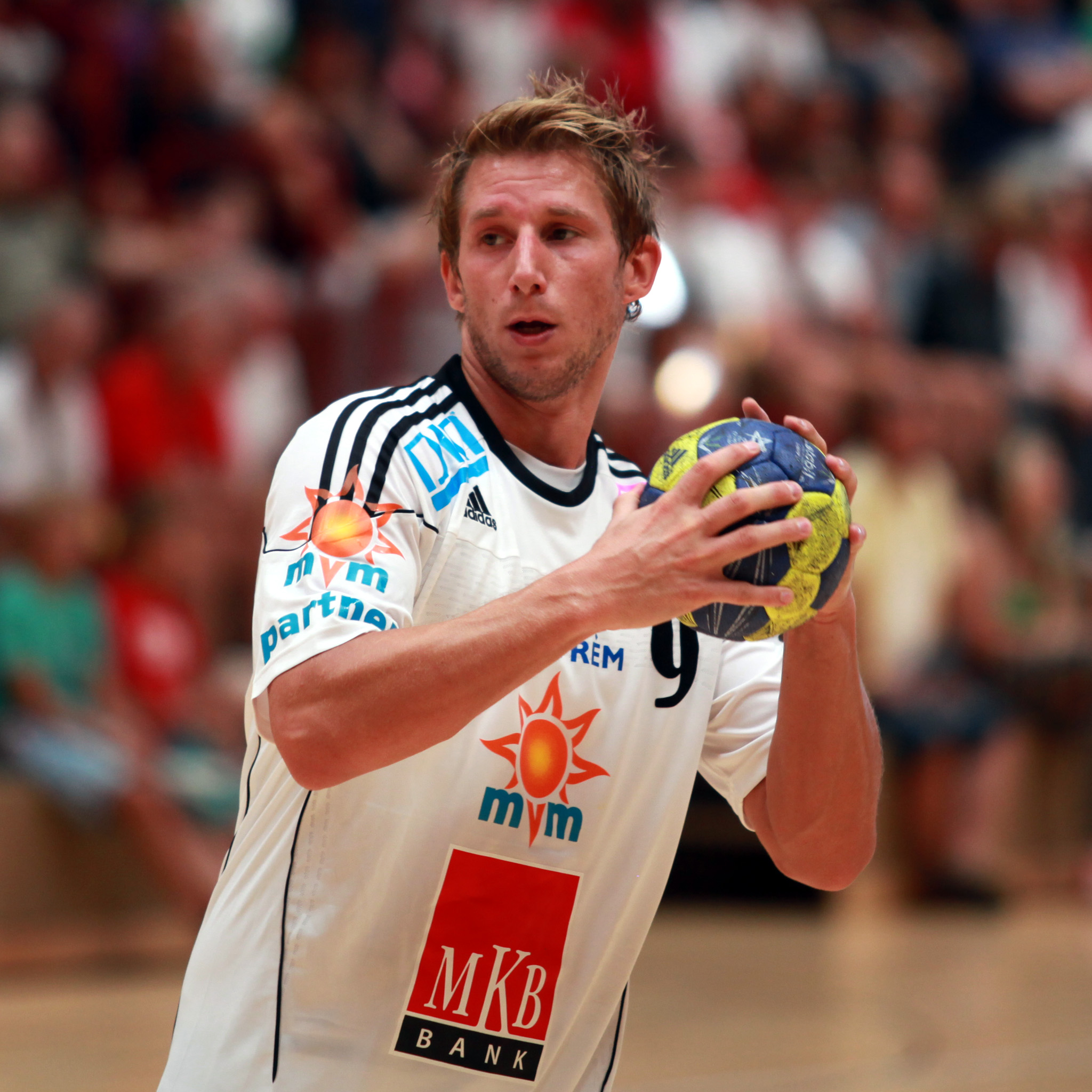

Personal information
- Full name: Tamás Iváncsik
- Nationality: Hungarian
- Born: 3 April 1983 (age 43) Győr, Hungary
- Height: 1.79 m (5 ft 10 in)

Sport
- Sport: Handball
- Position: Right Wing
- Current club: Retired

Youth career
- Years: Team
- –1999: (Hungary) ETO-SZESE Győr FKC

Senior clubs
- Years: Team
- 1999–2003: (Hungary) ETO-SZESE Győr FKC
- 2003–2006: (Hungary) Tatabánya KC
- 2006–2007: (Hungary) Dunaferr SE
- 2007–2015: (Hungary) MKB-MVM Veszprém KC
- 2014–2015: → (Hungary) Balatonfüredi KSE
- 2015–2016: (Romania) HCM Minaur
- 2016–2017: (Norway) Elverum Handball
- 2017–2019: (Hungary) ETO-SZESE Győr FKC
- 2019–2022: (Hungary) Tatai AC
National team
Years	Team	Apps	(Gls)
2004–2017	Hungary	117	(281)
- Updated on 10 February 2019

Tamás Iváncsik (born 3 April 1983 in Győr) is a Hungarian handballer.

The winger participated on four European Championships (2006, 2008, 2010, 2012) and represented Hungary on further three World Championships (2007, 2009, 2011).

== Personal ==
His father, Mihály Iváncsik is a former handball player, who has won the IHF Cup in 1986 and has received silver medal on the World Cup in the same year.

He has two brothers, Gergő Iváncsik and Ádám Iváncsik. Both of them are professional handball players and Hungarian internationals.

He is married. Her wife, Fatouma gave birth to their first daughter, Naima in December 2011 and to their second, Natali in October 2014.

== Achievements ==
- Nemzeti Bajnokság I:
  - Winner: 2008, 2009, 2010, 2011, 2012, 2013, 2014
  - Bronze Medalist: 2007
- Magyar Kupa:
  - Winner: 2009, 2010, 2011, 2012, 2013, 2014
  - Finalist: 2007, 2008
- EHF Cup Winners' Cup:
  - Winner: 2008
- EHF Champions Trophy:
  - Finalist: 2008

== Individual awards ==
- Junior Príma díj (2008)
- Hungarian Handballer of the Year: 2008
