= Tibor Oross =

Hungarian handball player (1959-1998)

Tibor Oross (7 June 1959 in Győr – 21 May 1998) was a Hungarian handball player.

With the Hungarian national team, he won a silver medal at the participated at the 1986 World Championship and placed fourth at the 1988 Olympic Games

At club level, he played many years for Győri ETO FKC.

Oross died on 21 May 1998, a few days before his 39th anniversary.
