= Ottó Csicsay =

Hungarian handball player (born 1961)

Ottó Csicsay (born 1961) is a Hungarian handball player. He participated at the 1988 Summer Olympics, where the Hungarian national team placed fourth, and at the 1992 Summer Olympics, where the team placed seventh.
