= Nebojša Simović =

Montenegrin handball player (born 1993)

Personal information
- Nationality: Montenegrin
- Born: 15 November 1993 (age 32)
- Height: 1.99 m (6 ft 6 in)

Sport
- Sport: Handball
- Position: Pivot
- Current club: HSG Nordhorn-Lingen
- Number: 33
National team
Years	Team	Apps	(Gls)
–	Montenegro	14	(13)

Nebojša Simović (born 15 November 1993) is a Montenegrin handball player for HSG Nordhorn-Lingen and the Montenegro men's national handball team.

He participated at the 2018 European Men's Handball Championship.
