= 2018–19 Nemzeti Bajnokság I/B (men's handball) =

NB I/B férfi felnőtt
- Season: 2018–19
- Promoted: [[]] (East) [[]] (West)
- Relegated: (East) (West)
- Matches played: 132 (East), 132 (West)

The 2018–19 Nemzeti Bajnokság I/B is the 51st season of the Nemzeti Bajnokság I/B, Hungary's second tier Handball league.

== Team information ==
There are 12–12 clubs in the 2 group, with three-three promoted teams from Nemzeti Bajnokság II.

=== Team changes ===
Promoted from 2017–18 Nemzeti Bajnokság II

- Nagykanizsai Izzó SE (South-west)

Relegated from 2017–18 Nemzeti Bajnokság I

- Váci KSE
- Orosházi FKSE

Relegated to 2018–19 Nemzeti Bajnokság II

- KK Ajka (North-west)
- Tatabánya KC (U20)
- Csurgói KK (U20)
- Törökszentmiklósi KE (South)
- MOL-Pick Szeged (South-east)

Promoted to 2018–19 Nemzeti Bajnokság I

- Vecsés SE
- Mezőkövesdi KC

=== Arenas and locations ===
Location of teams in 2018-19 Nemzeti Bajnokság I/B (West)
Location of teams in 2018-19 Nemzeti Bajnokság I/B (East)

==== Western Group ====
The following 12 clubs compete in the NB I/B (Western) during the 2018–19 season:

Team	Location	Arena
Balatonfüredi KSE (U21)	Balatonfüred	Észak-Balatoni Konf. Központ
Budai Farkasok KKUK	Budaörs	Városi Sportcsarnok
ETO - SZESE Győr FKC	Győr	Egyetemi Csarnok
Nagykanizsai Izzó SE	Nagykanizsa	Zsigmondy Sportcsarnok
NEKA	Balatonboglár	Urányi János Sportcsarnok
Pécsi VSE	Pécs	Lauber Dezső Sportcsarnok
Százhalombattai KE	Százhalombatta	Városi Szabadidő Központ
Szigetszentmiklósi KSK	Szigetszentmiklós	Városi Sportcsarnok
Tatai AC	Tata	Güntner Aréna
Váci KSE	Vác	Városi Sportcsarnok
Veszprém KC (U21)	Veszprém	Március 15. úti Sportcsarnok
Veszprémi KSE	Veszprém	Március 15. úti Sportcsarnok

==== Eastern Group ====
The following 12 clubs compete in the NB I/B (Eastern) during the 2018–19 season:

Team	Location	Arena
FKSE Algyő	Algyő	Fehér Ignác Ált. Isk.
Balassagyarmati Kábel SE	Balassagyarmat	Városi Sportcsarnok
Balmazújvárosi KK	Balmazújváros	Kőnig Rendezvényközpont
Békési FKC	Békés	Városi Sportcsarnokban
Debreceni EAC	Debrecen	DEAC Egyetemi Sportcentrum
Kecskeméti TE	Kecskemét	Messzi István Sportcsarnok
Mizse KC	Lajosmizse	Fekete István Ált. isk.
Nyíregyházi SN	Nyíregyháza	Continental Aréna
Orosházi FKSE	Orosháza	Városi Sportcsarnok
Ózdi KC	Ózd	Marosi István Sportcsarnok
PLER-Budapest	Budapest, XVIII. ker	Lőrinci Sportcsarnok
Törökszentmiklósi Székács	Törökszentmiklós	Székács Sportcsarnok

== See also ==
- 2018–19 Magyar Kupa
- 2018–19 Nemzeti Bajnokság I
- 2018–19 Nemzeti Bajnokság II
