= 2017–18 Magyar Kupa (men's handball) =

60th Hungarian men's handball competition

Tournament details
- Country: Hungary
- Dates: 1 September 2017 – 15 April 2018
- Teams: 50

Final positions
- Champions: Telekom Veszprém (27th title)
- Runners-up: MOL-Pick Szeged

Tournament statistics
- Matches played: 46 + 4 (Final four)

The 2017–18 Magyar Kupa, known as (Hungarian: TippMix férfi Magyar Kupa) for sponsorship reasons, was the 60th edition of the tournament.

== Schedule ==
The rounds of the 2017–18 competition are scheduled as follows:

| Round | Draw date and time | Matches |
|---|---|---|
| Round I | 3 August 2017, 11:00 CEST | 20 September 2017 |
| Round II | 26 September 2017, 13:00 CEST | 18 October 2017 |
| Round III | 24 October 2017, 13:00 CEST | 8 November 2017 |
| Round IV | 14 November 2017, 11:00 CET | 13 December 2017 |
| Round V | 23 January 2018, 11:00 CET | 7 March 2018 |
| Final four | 10 March 2018, 11:00 CET | 14–15 April 2018 |

== Matches ==
A total of 46 matches will take place, starting with Pre-qualifying on 1 September 2017 and culminating with the Final on 15 April 2018 at the Főnix Hall in Debrecen.

=== Pre-qualifying ===
The pre-qualifying round ties are scheduled for 1–8 September 2017.

| Team 1 | Score | Team 2 |
1 September
| Pilisvörösvári KSK (II) | 22–22 (a) | Csepeli DSE (II) |
5 September
| VSK Tököl (II) | 20–41 | PLER-Budapest (I/B) |
| Budai Farkasok KK (II) | 26–26 | Szigetszetmiklósi KSK (I/B) |
8 September
| Bakonyerdő Pápa (II) | 18–43 | ETO-SZESE Győr (I/B) |

=== Round I ===
The first round ties are scheduled for 6–20 September 2017.

| Team 1 | Score | Team 2 |
6 September
| Kisvárdai KC (II) | 24–27 | Százhalombattai KE (I/B) |
| ÓAM-Ózdi KC (I/B) | 26–20 | DEAC (I/B) |
| Törökszentmiklósi Székács (I/B) | 19–28 | Törökszentmiklósi KE (I/B) |
8 September
| PLER-Budapest (I/B) | 31–25 | Százhalombattai KE (I/B) |
19 September
| Salgótarjáni Strandépítők (II) | 27–38 | Nyíregyházi KC (I/B) |
| Siófok KC SE (Count. I) | 17–50 | NEKA (I/B) |
| Csepeli DSE (II) | 17–47 | Balassagyarmati Kábel SE (I/B) |
20 September
| Alba-MÁV Előre (II) | 14–44 | Veszprémi KSE (I/B) |
| Békés-Drén KC (I/B) | 27–24 | ContiTech FKSE-Algyő (I/B) |
| Mizse KC (I/B) | 24–27 | Kecskeméti TE (I/B) |
| Hajdúböszörményi TE (II) | 20–38 | Balmazújvárosi KK (I/B) |
| Várpalotai BSK (II) | 24–23 | Tatai AC (I/B) |
| ETO-SZESE Győr (I/B) | 32–18 | KK Ajka (I/B) |
| Pénzügyőr SE (II) | 22–32 | Vecsés SE (I/B) |
| Kalocsai KC (II) | 27–30 | Pécsi VSE (I/B) |
| Budai Farkasok KK (II) | 30–30 (a) | Rév TSC (II) |

=== Round II ===
The second round ties are scheduled for 2–18 October 2017.

| Team 1 | Score | Team 2 |
2 October
| ETO-SZESE Győr (I/B) | 31–26 | Pécsi VSE (I/B) |
10 October
| ÓAM-Ózdi KC (I/B) | 22–27 | Eger SBS Eszterházy (I) |
17 October
| Békés-Drén KC (I/B) | 20–29 | Ceglédi KKSE (I) |
| Nyíregyházi KC (I/B) | 34–29 | Mezőkövesdi KC (I/B) |
| Várpalotai BSK (II) | 27–33 | Sport36-Komló (I) |
| Rév TSC (II) | 18–33 | PLER-Budapest (I/B) |
20 October
| Veszprémi KSE (I/B) | 25–25 | NEKA (I/B) |
| Balmazújvárosi KK (I/B) | 30–28 | B. Braun Gyöngyös (I) |
| Balassagyarmati Kábel SE (I/B) | 22–30 | Ferencvárosi TC (I) |
| Törökszentmiklósi KE (I/B) | 26–30 | Dabas VSE KC (I) |
| Kecskeméti TE (I/B) | 28–31 | Orosházi FKSE- LINAMAR (I) |
| Vecsés SE (I/B) | 19–27 | Váci KSE (I) |

=== Round III ===
The third round ties are scheduled for 7–22 November 2017.

| Team 1 | Score | Team 2 |
7 November
| NEKA (I/B) | 23–32 | Grundfos Tatabánya KC (I) |
| Balmazújvárosi KK (I/B) | 30–28 | CYEB Budakalász (I) |
8 November
| ETO-SZESE Győr (I/B) | 25–29 | Csurgói KK (I) |
| Dabas VSE KC (I/B) | 26–27 | Orosházi FKSE- LINAMAR (I) |
14 November
| PLER-Budapest (I/B) | 27–31 | Sport36-Komló (I) |
| Nyíregyházi KC (I/B) | 28–32 | Ceglédi KKSE (I) |
| Váci KSE (I) | 26–33 | Eger SBS Eszterházy (I) |
22 November
| Ferencvárosi TC (I) | 26–27 | Balatonfüredi KSE (I) |

=== Round IV ===
The fourth round ties are scheduled for 12 December 2017 – 13 February 2018.

| Team 1 | Score | Team 2 |
12 December
| Balmazújvárosi KK (I/B) | 32–24 | Sport36-Komló (I) |
13 December
| Orosházi FKSE- LINAMAR (I) | 29–32 | Csurgói KK (I) |
31 January
| Ceglédi KKSE (I) | 25–26 | Balatonfüredi KSE (I) |
13 February
| Eger SBS Eszterházy (I) | 22–27 | Grundfos Tatabánya KC (I) |

=== Round V ===
The fifth round ties are scheduled for 2–6 March 2018.

| Team 1 | Score | Team 2 |
2 March
| Balatonfüredi KSE (I) | 24–23 | Grundfos Tatabánya KC (I) |
6 March
| Balmazújvárosi KK (I/B) | 22–32 | Csurgói KK (I) |

== Final four ==
The final four will be held on 14–15 April 2018 at the Főnix Hall in Debrecen.

Semi-finals
14 April, 13:00
MOL-Pick Szeged | 37
Csurgói KK | 17
14 April, 15:15
Telekom Veszprém | 38
Balatonfüredi KSE | 22

Final
15 April, 17:45
MOL-Pick Szeged | 21
Telekom Veszprém | 23
Bronze medal match
15 April, 15:15
Csurgói KK | 25
Balatonfüredi KSE | 31

=== Awards ===
- Most valuable player:
- Best Goalkeeper:

=== Semi-finals ===
| 14 April 2018; 13:00 (CEST) | MOL-Pick Szeged | 37 – 17 | Csurgói KK | Főnix Hall, Debrecen; Attendance: 1,500; Referees: Hargitai, Markó |
| 14 April 2018; 13:00 (CEST) | Sigurmannsson 9 | (19–7) | Gazdag 4 | Főnix Hall, Debrecen; Attendance: 1,500; Referees: Hargitai, Markó |
| 14 April 2018; 13:00 (CEST) | 3× (yellow card) 3× (suspension) | Report | 3× (yellow card) 4× (suspension) | Főnix Hall, Debrecen; Attendance: 1,500; Referees: Hargitai, Markó |

| 14 April 2018; 15:15 (CEST) | Telekom Veszprém | 38 – 22 | Balatonfüredi KSE | Főnix Hall, Debrecen; Attendance: 2,500; Referees: Bíró, Kiss |
| 14 April 2018; 15:15 (CEST) | Jamali 7 | (20–12) | Szita 4 | Főnix Hall, Debrecen; Attendance: 2,500; Referees: Bíró, Kiss |
| 14 April 2018; 15:15 (CEST) | 2× (yellow card) 2× (suspension) | Report | 2× (yellow card) 4× (suspension) | Főnix Hall, Debrecen; Attendance: 2,500; Referees: Bíró, Kiss |

=== Bronze medal match ===
| 15 April 2018; 15:15 (CEST) | Csurgói KK | 25 – 31 | Balatonfüredi KSE | Főnix Hall, Debrecen; Attendance: 4,000; Referees: Bócz, Wiedemann |
| 15 April 2018; 15:15 (CEST) | Vasić 6 | (10–16) | Topić 6 | Főnix Hall, Debrecen; Attendance: 4,000; Referees: Bócz, Wiedemann |
| 15 April 2018; 15:15 (CEST) | 2× (yellow card) 2× (suspension) | Report | 3× (yellow card) 3× (suspension) | Főnix Hall, Debrecen; Attendance: 4,000; Referees: Bócz, Wiedemann |

=== Final ===
| 15 April 2018; 17:45 (CEST) | MOL-Pick Szeged | 21 – 23 | Telekom Veszprém | Főnix Hall, Debrecen; Attendance: 6,500; Referees: Herczeg, Südi |
| 15 April 2018; 17:45 (CEST) | Sigurmannsson, Bodó 4 | (11–10) | Lékai 6 | Főnix Hall, Debrecen; Attendance: 6,500; Referees: Herczeg, Südi |
| 15 April 2018; 17:45 (CEST) | 2× (yellow card) 2× (suspension) | Report | 3× (yellow card) 8× (suspension) | Főnix Hall, Debrecen; Attendance: 6,500; Referees: Herczeg, Südi |

2017–18 Magyar Kupa
Winner

Telekom Veszprém
27th title

Mikler, Alilović (goalkeepers), Ancsin, Blagotinšek, Gajić, Ilić, Lékai, Ligetvári, Jamali, Manaskov,
Marguč, Nagy (c), Nenadić, Nilsson, Schuch, Sulić, Terzić, Tønnesen, Ugalde
Head coach: Ljubomir Vranjes

==== Final standings ====
| | Team |
|---|---|
| | Telekom Veszprém |
| Silver medal | MOL-Pick Szeged |
| Bronze medal | Balatonfüredi KSE |
| | Csurgói KK |

== See also ==
- 2017–18 Nemzeti Bajnokság I
- 2017–18 Nemzeti Bajnokság I/B
- 2017–18 Nemzeti Bajnokság II
