= Debreceni EAC (men's handball) =

Hungarian handball club

- Full name: Debreceni Egyetemi Atlétikai Club
- Short name: DEAC
- Founded: 2005; 21 years ago
- Arena: DESOK csarnok, Debrecen
- Capacity: 400
- Head coach: Norbert Mándi
- League: Nemzeti Bajnokság I/B
- Club colours
Home	Away

Debreceni Egyetemi Atlétikai Club is a Hungarian handball club from Debrecen, that plays in the Nemzeti Bajnokság I/B, the second level championship in Hungary.

Location of Debreceni EAC

== History ==
D-Medikus SE was founded in 2005, consisting of medical students of the University of Debrecen. It was integrated into the divisions of the DEAC after the band moved up to the Nemzeti Bajnokság II division. In the Nemzeti Bajnokság II, the team finished in the middle field in the first year, then fell back to the county championship. The team that won the silver medal in 2012 returned to the Nemzeti Bajnokság II championship. In the 2016/2017 season, the team took first place in the North-Eastern group of the Nemzeti Bajnokság II adult, so it was able to continue the 2017/2018 season in the Nemzeti Bajnokság I/B. They failed to stay in the 2018/2019 season, so the team is fighting again in Nemzeti Bajnokság II. He was able to continue the 2020/2021 season again in the Nemzeti Bajnokság I/B, where he has been playing ever since.

== Crest, colours, supporters ==
=== Kits ===
HOME

2023–24

AWAY
2021–22	2023–24

== Sports Hall information ==
- Name: – DESOK csarnok (Debreceni Egyetem Sporttudományi Oktatóközpont csarnok)
- City: – Debrecen
- Capacity: – 400
- Address: – 4032, Debrecen, Egyetem tér 1.

== Team ==
=== Current squad ===
Squad for the 2024–25 season

Debreceni EAC

Goalkeepers

- 16 (Hungary) Tamás Boros
- (Hungary) Ákos Hermann

Left Wingers

- 31 (Hungary) Tamás Illés
- 34 (Hungary) László Szolnoki

Right Wingers

- 22 (Hungary) Gábor Fülöp
- 35 (Hungary) Axel Kiss

Line Players

- 63 (Hungary) Patrik Rusznák
- 89 (Hungary) Péter István
- (Hungary) Zsolt Radvánszki

Central Backs

- 8 (Hungary) Roland Kiss
- 18 (Hungary) Ádám Bakó
- 44 (Hungary) Ákos Pethő

Left Backs

- 5 (Hungary) Norbert Mucza
- 23 (Hungary) Patrik Hegedűs
- 32 (Hungary) Péter Kathi
- 45 (Hungary) Ádám Kerezsi
- (Hungary) Bence Kovács

Right Backs

- 85 (Hungary) Máté Tóth
- (Hungary) Márton Tusjak
- (Hungary) Máté Kurucz

=== Technical staff ===
- Head coach: (Hungary) Norbert Mándi
- Assistant coach: (Hungary) Krisztián Mándi

=== Transfers ===
Transfers for the 2024–25 season

Joining

- (Hungary) Márton Tusjak (RB) from (Hungary) OTP Bank - Pick Szeged U21
- (Hungary) Máté Kurucz (RB) from (Hungary) Győri ETO-UNI FKC
- (Hungary) Zsolt Radvánszki (LP) from (Hungary) Győri ETO-UNI FKC
- (Hungary) Bence Kovács (LB) from (Hungary) Mezőkövesdi KC
- (Hungary) Ákos Hermann (GK) from (Hungary) Tatai AC

Leaving

- (Hungary) Zoltán Hornyák (LP) (retires)
- (Hungary) Ádám Mórucz (RB) (retires)
- (Hungary) Richárd Almásy (LB) (retires)
- (Hungary) Máté Király (LB) (retires)
- (Hungary) Donát Karnok (RW) (retires)
- (Hungary) Balázs Dobos (LP)
- (Hungary) Ádám Maródi (GK)

Transfers for the 2023–24 season

Joining

- (Hungary) Máté Tóth (RB) from (Hungary) OTP Bank - Pick Szeged U21
- (Hungary) Donát Karnok (RW) from (Hungary) HE-DO B. Braun Gyöngyös
- (Hungary) Patrik Rusznák (LP) from (Hungary) Békési FKC
- (Hungary) Ádám Kerezsi (LB) from (Hungary) QHB-Eger
- (Hungary) Richárd Almásy (LB) from (Hungary) BFKA-Veszprém
- (Hungary) Patrik Hegedűs (LB) from (Hungary) OTP Bank - Pick Szeged U21

Leaving

- (Hungary) István Rédei (RB) (retires)
- (Hungary) Ádám Bíró (RB)
- (Hungary) Sándor Balázs (LB)

== Recent seasons ==
- Seasons in Nemzeti Bajnokság I/B: 6
- Seasons in Nemzeti Bajnokság II: 8

Season	Division	Pos.	Magyar kupa
2005–06	County I	1st	
2006–07	County I	3rd	
2007–08	County I	1st	
2008–09	NB II Északkelet	8th	
2009–10	NB II Északkelet	11th	
2010–11	County I	2nd	
2011–12	County I	2nd	
2012–13	NB II Északkelet	9th	
2013–14	NB II Északkelet	5th	
2014–15	NB II Északkelet	8th	
2015–16	NB II Északkelet	7th	
2016–17	NB II Északkelet	1st	
2017–18	NB I/B Kelet	7th	
2018–19	NB I/B Kelet	11th	
2019–20	NB II Északkelet	Cancelled	
2020–21	NB I/B Kelet	8th	
2021–22	NB I/B	16th	
2022–23	NB I/B	6th	
2023–24	NB I/B		

== Former club members ==
=== Notable former players ===
- (Hungary) Sándor Bohács (2009–2010)
- (Hungary) István Rédei (2021–2023)
