= 2018–19 Magyar Kupa (men's handball) =

61st Hungarian men's handball competition

Tournament details
- Country: Hungary
- Dates: 29 August 2018 – 7 April 2019
- Teams: 52

Final positions
- Champions: MOL-Pick Szeged (7th title)
- Runners-up: Telekom Veszprém
- Third place: Balatonfüredi KSE
- Fourth place: RotaChrom Dabas

Tournament statistics
- Matches played: 46 + 4 (Final four)

Awards
- Best player: (Slovenia) Dean Bombač

The 2018–19 Magyar Kupa, known as (Hungarian: TippMix férfi Magyar Kupa) for sponsorship reasons, was the 61st edition of the tournament.

== Schedule ==
The rounds of the 2018–19 competition are scheduled as follows:

Round	Draw date and time	Matches	Number of fixtures	Clubs	New entries this round
Pre-qualifying	2 August 2018, 11:00 CEST	2 September 2018	6	12 → 6	12
Round I	2 August 2018, 11:00 CEST	19 September 2018	16	32 → 16	26
Round II	25 September 2018, 11:00 CEST	17 October 2018	8	16 → 8	none
Round III	24 October 2018, 11:00 CEST	21 November 2018	8	16 → 8	8
Round IV	27 November 2018, 11:00 CET	12 December 2018	6	12 → 6	4
Round V	18 December 2018, 11:00 CET	13 March 2019	4	8 → 4	2
Final four	19 March 2019, 11:00 CET	6–7 April 2019	4	4 → 1	none

== Matches ==
A total of 52 matches took place, starting with Pre-qualifying on 29 August 2018 and culminating with the Final on 7 April 2019.

=== Pre-qualifying ===
The pre-qualifying round ties was scheduled for 29 August – 2 September 2018.

Team 1	Score	Team 2
29 August
Pilisvörösvári KSK (II)	30–35	Balassagyarmati Kábel SE (I/B)
30 August
Alba-MÁV Előre (II)	23–38	Agrofeed ETO-SZESE (I/B)
Tiszavasvári SE (II)	36–26	Nyírbátori SC (II)
Dunaharaszti MTK (II)	27–23	Százhalombattai KE (I/B)
2 September
Dél Takarék Mecseknádasd (II)	20–21	Kalocsai KC (II)
Mikolik Handball School (Count. I)	29–31	Pénzügyőr SE (II)

=== First round ===
The first round ties was scheduled for 5–19 September 2018.

Team 1	Score	Team 2
5 September
Kisvárdai KC (II)	21–24	DEAC (I/B)
Euroscale Kecskeméti FS (Count.)	17–24	Törökszentmiklósi Székács (I/B)
7 September
Tatai AC (I/B)	23–23 (a)	Veszprém KKFT Felsőörs (I/B)
Nyíregyházi KC (I/B)	27–24	ÓAM-Ózdi KC (I/B)
KTE-Piroska szörp (I/B)	27–19	Békés-Drén KC (I/B)
8 September
OKTAT60 Hatvani KSZSE (II)	22–19	Váci KSE (I/B)
17 September
ContiTech FKSE-Algyő (I/B)	28–28 (a)	Orosházi FKSE- LINAMAR (I/B)
18 September
Csömör KSK (II)	35–37	Balassagyarmati Kábel SE (I/B)
Dunaharaszti MTK (II)	34–33	Mizse KC (I/B)
19 September
TUNGSRAM SE-Nagykanizsa (I/B)	33–19	NEKA (I/B)
Bugyi SE (Count. I)	25–49	Szigetszetmiklósi KSK (I/B)
Tiszavasvári SE (II)	34–39	Balmazújvárosi KK (I/B)
Kalocsai KC (II)	28–31	Pécsi VSE (I/B)
Pénzügyőr SE (II)	20–46	PLER-Budapest (I/B)
VSK Tököl (II)	25–34	Budai Farkasok KK (I/B)
KK Ajka (II)	23–29	Agrofeed ETO-SZESE (I/B)

=== Second round ===
The second round ties was scheduled for 9–17 October 2018.

Team 1	Score	Team 2
9 October
Nyíregyházi KC (I/B)	22–29	Orosházi FKSE- LINAMAR (I/B)
10 October
Budai Farkasok KK (I/B)	24–34	PLER-Budapest (I/B)
OKTAT60 Hatvani KSZSE (II)	26–24	Balassagyarmati Kábel SE (I/B)
16 October
Dunaharaszti MTK (II)	29–34	Veszprémi KSE-Felsőörs (I/B)
KTE-Piroska szörp (I/B)	29–25	DEAC (I/B)
Törökszentmiklósi Székács (I/B)	30–40	Balmazújvárosi KK (I/B)
17 October
Agrofeed ETO-SZESE (I/B)	27–26	Pécsi VSE (I/B)
Szigetszetmiklósi KSK (I/B)	29–29 (a)	TUNGSRAM SE-Nagykanizsa (I/B)

=== Third round ===
The third round ties was scheduled for 13–21 November 2018.

Team 1	Score	Team 2
13 November
Balmazújvárosi KK (I/B)	32–35	Ceglédi KKSE (I)
Veszprémi KSE-Felsőörs (I/B)	29–43	RotaChrom Dabas (I)
14 November
TUNGSRAM SE-Nagykanizsa (I/B)	28–36	Ferencvárosi TC (I)
19 November
KTE-Piroska szörp (I/B)	27–32	DVTK-Eger (I)
20 November
OKTAT60 Hatvani KSZSE (II)	18–30	HE-DO B. Braun Gyöngyös (I)
21 November
PLER-Budapest (I/B)	22–28	CYEB Budakalász (I)
Agrofeed ETO-SZESE (I/B)	25–15	Vecsés SE (I)
Orosházi FKSE- LINAMAR (I/B)	27–28	Mezőkövesdi KC (I)

=== Fourth round ===
The fourth round ties was scheduled for 3–12 December 2018.

Team 1	Score	Team 2
3 December
DVTK-Eger (I)	26–26 (a)	RotaChrom Dabas (I)
9 December
Ceglédi KKSE (I)	32–39	Grundfos Tatabánya KC (I)
11 December
Mezőkövesdi KC (I)	28–25	Csurgói KK (I)
Sport36-Komló (I)	24–24 (a)	Ferencvárosi TC (I)
Balatonfüredi KSE (I)	28–24	HE-DO B. Braun Gyöngyös (I)
12 December
Agrofeed ETO-SZESE (I/B)	18–23	CYEB Budakalász (I)

=== Fifth round ===
The fifth round ties was scheduled for 12 February – 13 March 2019.

Team 1	Score	Team 2
12 February
MOL-Pick Szeged (I)	36–24	Mezőkövesdi KC (I)
15 February
RotaChrom Dabas (I)	26–23	Ferencvárosi TC (I)
12 March
Grundfos Tatabánya KC (I)	21–30	Telekom Veszprém (I)
13 March
CYEB Budakalász (I)	23–33	Balatonfüredi KSE (I)

== Final four ==
The final four will be held on 6–7 April 2019 at the Főnix Hall in Debrecen.

Semi-finals
6 April, 13:00
RotaChrom Dabas	16
Telekom Veszprém	38
6 April, 15:15
MOL-Pick Szeged	33
Balatonfüredi KSE	26

Final
7 April, 16:00
Telekom Veszprém	27
MOL-Pick Szeged	28
Bronze medal match
7 April, 13:30
RotaChrom Dabas	20
Balatonfüredi KSE	21

=== Awards ===
- Most valuable player: (Slovenia) Dean Bombač
- Best Goalkeeper:

=== Semi-finals ===
6 April 2019; 13:00 (CEST)	RotaChrom Dabas	16 – 38	Telekom Veszprém	Főnix Hall, Debrecen; Attendance: 3,000; Referees: Sándor, Szikszay
6 April 2019; 13:00 (CEST)	Perišić 6	(6–16)	Gajić 7	Főnix Hall, Debrecen; Attendance: 3,000; Referees: Sándor, Szikszay
6 April 2019; 13:00 (CEST)	3× (yellow card) 3× (suspension)	Report	2× (yellow card) 6× (suspension) 1× (red card)	Főnix Hall, Debrecen; Attendance: 3,000; Referees: Sándor, Szikszay

6 April 2019; 15:15 (CEST)	MOL-Pick Szeged	33 – 26	Balatonfüredi KSE	Főnix Hall, Debrecen; Attendance: 3,100; Referees: Hargitai, Markó
6 April 2019; 15:15 (CEST)	Balogh 6	(16–13)	Szita 5	Főnix Hall, Debrecen; Attendance: 3,100; Referees: Hargitai, Markó
6 April 2019; 15:15 (CEST)	4× (yellow card) 1× (suspension)	Report	3× (yellow card) 3× (suspension)	Főnix Hall, Debrecen; Attendance: 3,100; Referees: Hargitai, Markó

=== Bronze medal match ===
7 April 2019; 13:30 (CEST)	RotaChrom Dabas	20 – 21	Balatonfüredi KSE	Főnix Hall, Debrecen; Attendance: 4,000; Referees: Altmár, Horváth
7 April 2019; 13:30 (CEST)	Kekezović, Borsos 4	(13–10)	Szita 6	Főnix Hall, Debrecen; Attendance: 4,000; Referees: Altmár, Horváth
7 April 2019; 13:30 (CEST)	2× (yellow card) 6× (suspension)	Report	1× (yellow card) 4× (suspension)	Főnix Hall, Debrecen; Attendance: 4,000; Referees: Altmár, Horváth

=== Final ===
7 April 2019; 16:00 (CEST)	Telekom Veszprém	27 – 28	MOL-Pick Szeged	Főnix Hall, Debrecen; Attendance: 6,500; Referees: Bíró, Kiss
7 April 2019; 16:00 (CEST)	Nagy 7	(10–17)	Maqueda 8	Főnix Hall, Debrecen; Attendance: 6,500; Referees: Bíró, Kiss
7 April 2019; 16:00 (CEST)	1× (yellow card) 4× (suspension)	Report	2× (yellow card) 5× (suspension) 1× (red card)	Főnix Hall, Debrecen; Attendance: 6,500; Referees: Bíró, Kiss

==== Final standings ====
	Team
	MOL-Pick Szeged
Silver medal	Telekom Veszprém
Bronze medal	Balatonfüredi KSE
	RotaChrom Dabas

2018–19 Magyar Kupa
Winner

MOL-Pick Szeged
7th title

Alilović, Šego (goalkeepers), Balogh, Bánhidi, Blažević, Bodó, Bombač,
Cañellas, Gaber, Henigman, Källman (c), Kašpárek,
Maqueda, Sigurmannsson, Šoštarič, Zhitnikov
Head coach: Juan Carlos Pastor, Assistant coach: Marko Krivokapić

== See also ==
- 2018–19 Nemzeti Bajnokság I
- 2018–19 Nemzeti Bajnokság I/B
- 2018–19 Nemzeti Bajnokság II
