= Gábor Ancsin =

Hungarian handball player (born 1990)

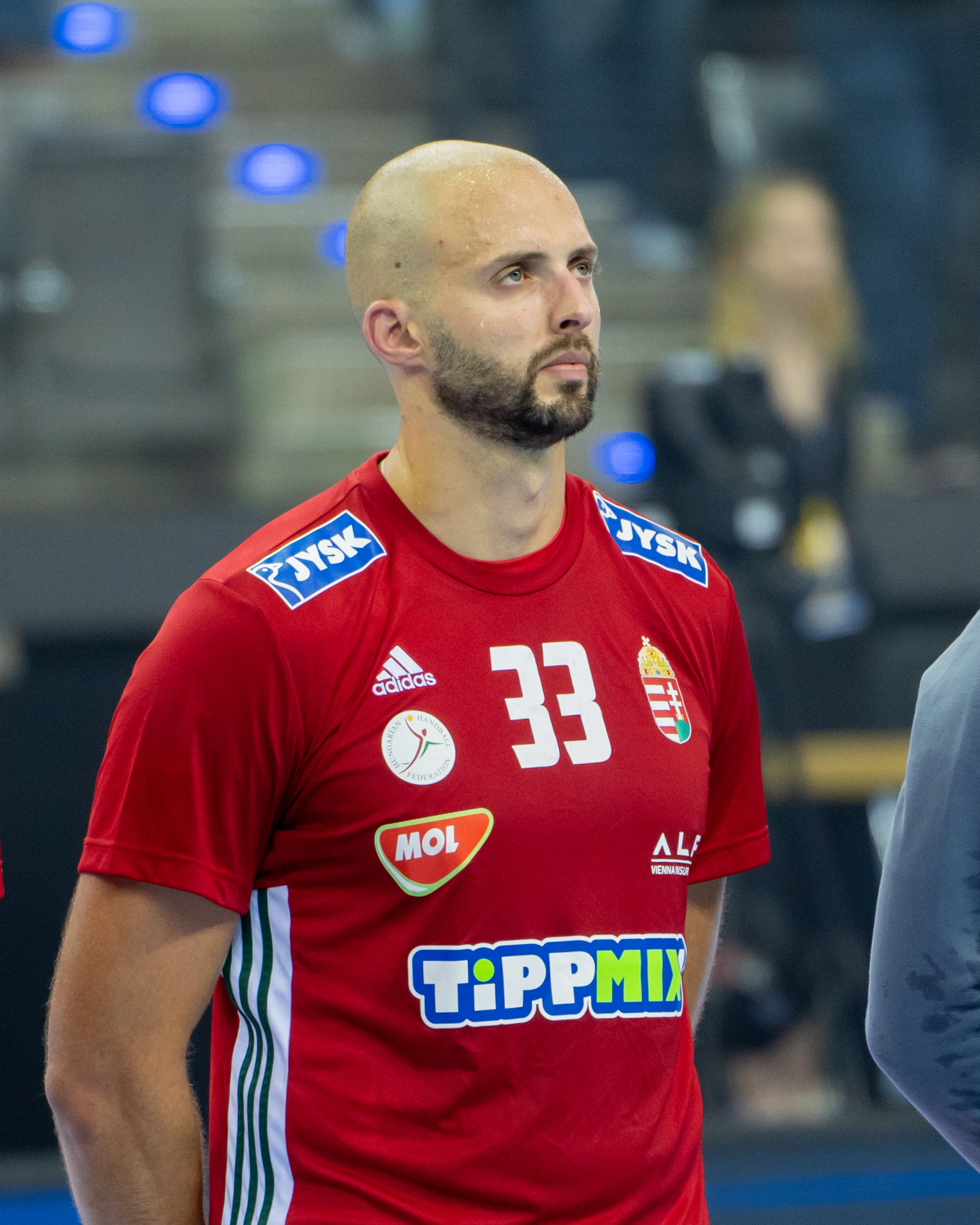

Personal information
- Nationality: Hungarian
- Born: 27 November 1990 (age 35) Békéscsaba, Hungary
- Height: 2.02 m (6 ft 8 in)

Sport
- Sport: Handball
- Position: Right back
- Current club: Ferencvárosi TC
- Number: 27

Youth career
- Years: Team
- 2002–2004: Kétsopronyi Rákóczi SE
- 2004–2005: Békési FKC
- 2005–2007: Dunaferr SE

Senior clubs
- Years: Team
- 2007–2009: Dunaferr SE
- 2007–2009: → Alba Regia KSE (loan)
- 2009–2011: Rhein-Neckar Löwen
- 2009–2011: → TSG Friesenheim (loan)
- 2011–2016: SC Pick Szeged
- 2016–2019: Telekom Veszprém
- 2018–2019: → Ferencvárosi TC (loan)
- 2019–2024: Tatabánya KC
- 2024–: Ferencvárosi TC
National team
Years	Team	Apps	(Gls)
2009–2025	Hungary	173	(383)

Gábor Ancsin (born 27 November 1990) is a Hungarian handball player for Ferencvárosi TC and the Hungarian national team.

== Career ==
=== Club ===
Ancsin made his senior debut in the Hungarian top division for Dunaferr SE in 2007. His talent was spotted soon and teams from Spain and Germany showed interesting in signing him. Finally, he chose Rhein-Neckar Löwen and moved to the Mannheim-based team in 2009. Gábor was sent immediately on loan to second division side TSG Friesenheim by his club, with them he celebrated promotion to Handball-Bundesliga at the end of the season. The right back spent the next season by Frisenheim as well, however, the team did not manage to maintain its top division membership. In May 2011 the officials of Löwen and SC Pick Szeged announced that Ancsin joins the Hungarians on a two-year deal, during which period the German team have buy-out option. Ancsin finally remained a player of SC Pick Szeged until 2016, after which he was certified to the multiple Hungarian champion, Telekom Veszprém. After a period of neglect in Veszprém, he proved his loan to Ferencvárosi TC. He found himself here, played a lot and finished 3rd on the scoreboard with 144 goals, after that he was confirmed in the 3rd best Hungarian team for Grundfos Tatabánya KC.

=== National team ===
In 2008, he was a member of the 12th Hungarian team at the Youth European Championship. As a member of the junior national team, he participated in the 2011 Junior World Championship where the Hungarian team became the 17th. At the age of 19, on March 20, 2009, he made his debut in the adult team in Vienna in the Hungary-Tunisia match 31-29 (He scored 3 goals). As a member of the Hungarian national team, he participated in the 2012 European Championships (8th place, 6 matches / 4 goals), the 2013 World Championship (8th place, 7 matches / 7 goals), the 2014 European Championships (8th place, 5 matches / 19 goals), the 2016 European Championships (12th place, 6 matches / 13 goals), the 2017 World Championship (7th place, 7 matches / 9 goals), the 2018 European Championships (14th place, 3 matches / 4 goals), the 2019 World Championship (10th place, 4 matches / 4 goals), the 2021 World Championship (5th place, 7 matches / 19 goals).

== Honours ==
=== Club ===
Dunaferr SE

- Nemzeti Bajnokság I
  - Bronze: 2007, 2008, 2009
- Magyar Kupa
  - Bronze: 2008

Alba Regia KSE

- Nemzeti Bajnokság I/B
  - Bronze: 2008

TSG Friesenheim

- 2. Handball-Bundesliga
  - Gold: 2010

MOL-Pick Szeged

- EHF Cup
  - Gold: 2014
- Nemzeti Bajnokság I
  - Silver: 2012, 2013, 2014, 2015, 2016
- Magyar Kupa
  - Silver: 2012, 2013, 2014, 2015, 2016

Telekom Veszprém

- EHF Champions League
  - Bronze: 2017
- SEHA League
  - Silver: 2017
- Nemzeti Bajnokság I
  - Gold: 2017
  - Silver: 2018
- Magyar Kupa
  - Gold: 2017, 2018

Grundfos Tatabánya KC

- Nemzeti Bajnokság I
  - Bronze: 2021, 2023, 2024

Ferencvárosi TC

- Nemzeti Bajnokság I
  - Bronze: 2025

=== Individual ===
- Hungarian Youth Handballer of the Year: 2008
- Hungarian Junior Handballer of the Year: 2011
