= 2015–16 Magyar Kupa (men's handball) =

58th Hungarian men's handball competition

Tournament details
- Country: Hungary
- Teams: 51

Final positions
- Champions: MVM Veszprém (25th title)
- Runner-up: MOL-Pick Szeged

The 2015–16 Magyar Kupa, known as (Hungarian: BOMBA! férfi Magyar Kupa) for sponsorship reasons, was the 58th edition of the tournament.

== Participating teams ==
The following 51 teams qualified for the competition:

Enter in Final four	Enter in Round 3	Enter in Round 2		Enter in Round 1		Enter in preliminary round
2014-15 NB I 1-2 teams	2014-15 NB I 3-6 teams	2014-15 NB I 7-12 teams	2014-15 NB I/B; Winners of 2 groups	32 teams		
MVM Veszprém; MOL-Pick Szeged	Grundfos Tatabánya KC; Csurgói KK; Balatonfüredi KSE; Orosházi FKSE	B.Braun Gyöngyös; Mezőkövesdi KC; Ceglédi KKSE; PLER-Budapest; Kőnig-Trade Balmazújváros; Sport36-Komló	Eger SBS Eszterházy; Váci KSE	Nyíregyházi KC; FTC; CYEB Mizse KC; Békés-Drén Kézilabda Club; KTE-Kisokos; Ózdi KC; Balassagyarmati Kábel SE; Juhász`99 Füzesabonyi SC; ARAGO Törökszentmiklósi KE	CYEB-Budakalász FKC; Dabas-Diego KC; Tatai AC; Pécsi VSE; Százhalombattai KE; Alba Regia KSE; Vecsés SE Él-Team; SZESE Győr; Várpalotai BSK	

=== Map ===
Locations of the 2015–16 Magyar Kupa (men's handball) clubs

Budapest teams	Szeged teams	Győr teams	Veszprém teams	Törökszentmiklós teams
PLER-Budapest; Ferencvárosi TC; Pénzügyőr SE	SC Pick Szeged; Fiatal Kézilabdások SE	SZESE Győr; Győri ETO KSZE	Veszprém KC; Veszprémi KSE	Törökszentmiklósi KE; Székács KE

== Schedule ==
The rounds of the 2015–16 competition are scheduled as follows:

Round	Draw date and time	Matches
Round 1	4 August 2015, 13:00 CEST	16 September 2015
Round 2	21 September 2015, 13:00 CEST	30 September 2015
Round 3	6 October 2015, 13:00 CEST	21 October 2015
Round 4	3 November 2015, 11:00 CET	2 December 2015
Quarter-finals	8 January 2016, 11:00 CET	3 February 2016
Final four	—	2–3 April 2016

== Matches ==
A total of 51 matches will take place, starting with Preliminary round on 31 August 2015 and culminating with the final on 17 April 2016 at the Főnix Csarnok in Debrecen.

=== Preliminary round ===
The first round ties are scheduled for 31 August – 8 September 2015.

Team 1	Score	Team 2
31 August
VSK Tököl (II)	26–38	CYEB Mizse KC (I/B)
2 September
Gyömrő VSK (II)	22–31	KTE-Kisokos (I/B)
6 September
Budai Farkasok KK ()	16–42	Ferencvárosi TC (I/B)
8 September
Csömör KSK (I/B)	18–37	CYEB-Budakalász FKC (I/B)
Pénzügyőr SE (II)	30–34	Szigetszetmiklósi KSK (I/B)

=== Round 1 ===
The first round ties are scheduled for 2–16 September 2015.

Team 1	Score	Team 2
2 September
ARAGO Törökszentmiklósi KE (I/B)	25–30	Fiatal Kézilabdások SE ()
4 September
Vecsés SE Él-Team (I/B)	25–25	Százhalombattai KE (I/B)
9 September
ÓAM-Ózdi KC (I/B)	25–24	Juhász`99 Füzesabonyi SC (I/B)
Fehérgyarmati VSE (II)	29–30	Balassagyarmati Kábel SE (I/B)
Le Belier-KK Ajka (II)	25–30	Veszprémi KSE (I/B)
Hajdúböszörményi TE (II)	23–31	VKK Nyírbátor (I/B)
15 September
CYEB-Budakalász FKC (I/B)	48–27	KTE-Kisokos (I/B)
CONTITECH Makói KC (II)	27–37	Békés-Drén Kézilabda Club (I/B)
16 September
Várpalotai BSK (I/B)	23–28	SZESE Győr (I/B)
Győri ETO KSZE ()	14–50	Alba Regia KSE (I/B)
Tiszavasvári SE-QUICK2000 (II)	23–38	Nyíregyházi KC (I/B)
Kalocsai KC (II)	22–21	Pécsi VSE (I/B)
Ferencvárosi TC (I/B)	26–25	Dabas-Diego KC (I/B)
Hódmezővásárhelyi KE ()	18–45	Törökszentmiklósi Székács KE (I/B)
Elmax VSE Pápa (II)	20–34	Tatai AC (I/B)
Szigetszetmiklósi KSK (I/B)	31–25	CYEB Mizse KC (I/B)

=== Round 2 ===
The second round ties are scheduled for 29 September – 8 October 2015.

Team 1	Score	Team 2
29 September
Balassagyarmati Kábel SE (I/B)	32–35	Nyíregyházi KC (I/B)
30 September
Eger SBS Eszterházy (I)	22–32	Mezőkövesdi KC (I)
CYEB-Budakalász FKC (I/B)	30–31	Ferencvárosi TC (I/B)
Százhalombattai KE (I/B)	20–24	PLER-Budapest (I)
Kalocsai KC (II)	26–29	Békés-Drén Kézilabda Club (I/B)
VKK Nyírbátor (I/B)	27–25	B.Braun Gyöngyös (I)
Alba Regia KSE (I/B)	20–33	Váci KSE (I)
Törökszentmiklósi Székács KE (I/B)	28–38	Fiatal Kézilabdások SE ()
Veszprémi KSE (I/B)	23–29	Sport36-Komló (I)
7 October
ÓAM-Ózdi KC (I/B)	21–28	Kőnig-Trade Balmazújváros (I)
Tatai AC (I/B)	29–40	SZESE Győr (I/B)
8 October
Szigetszetmiklósi KSK (I/B)	32–42	Ceglédi KKSE (I)

=== Round 3 ===
The third round ties are scheduled for 14–21 October 2015.

Team 1	Score	Team 2
14 October
Ferencvárosi TC (I/B)	27–33	Balatonfüredi KSE (I)
20 October
Fiatal Kézilabdások SE ()	24–29	Orosházi FKSE (I)
21 October
Békés-Drén Kézilabda Club (I/B)	21–27	Mezőkövesdi KC (I)
Nyíregyházi KC (I/B)	27–23	VKK Nyírbátor (I/B)
PLER-Budapest (I)	24–25	Sport36-Komló (I)
Csurgói KK (I)	27–22	Grundfos Tatabánya KC (I)
SZESE Győr (I/B)	28–39	Váci KSE (I)
Ceglédi KKSE (I)	29–26	Kőnig-Trade Balmazújváros (I)

=== Round 4 ===
The fourth round ties are scheduled for 1–15 December 2015.

Team 1	Score	Team 2
1 December
Balatonfüredi KSE (I)	34–24	Sport36-Komló (I)
Nyíregyházi KC (I/B)	26–35	Orosházi FKSE (I)
2 December
Váci KSE (I)	23–30	Csurgói KK (I)
16 December
Mezőkövesdi KC (I)	26–25	Ceglédi KKSE (I)

=== Quarter-finals (Round 5) ===
The fifth round ties are scheduled for 3 February 2016.

Team 1	Score	Team 2
3 February
Orosházi FKSE (I)	22–24	Mezőkövesdi KC (I)
17 February
Csurgói KK (I)	17–24	Balatonfüredi KSE (I)

=== Final four ===
The final four will be held on 16 and 17 April 2016 at the Főnix Csarnok in Debrecen.

Semi-finals
16 April, 12:00
MOL-Pick Szeged	33
Mezőkövesdi KC	27
16 April, 14:00
Balatonfüredi KSE	21
MVM Veszprém	40

Final
17 April, 16:00
MOL-Pick Szeged	24 (2)
MVM Veszprém (pen.)	24 (3)
Third place
17 April, 13:45
Mezőkövesdi KC	25
Balatonfüredi KSE	27

==== Awards ====
- MVP: (Iceland) Aron Pálmarsson (MVM Veszprém)
- Best Goalkeeper: (Spain) José Manuel Sierra (MOL-Pick Szeged)

Semi-finals

16 April; 12:00	MOL-Pick Szeged	33 – 27	Mezőkövesdi KC	Főnix csarnok, Debrecen; Attendance: 1,500; Referees: Medve, Nagy
16 April; 12:00	Ćuruvija 9	(19–15)	Grigoriev 8	Főnix csarnok, Debrecen; Attendance: 1,500; Referees: Medve, Nagy
16 April; 12:00	3× (yellow card) 2× (suspension)	Report	3× (yellow card) 4× (suspension) 1× (red card)	Főnix csarnok, Debrecen; Attendance: 1,500; Referees: Medve, Nagy

16 April; 14:00	Balatonfüredi KSE	21 – 40	MVM Veszprém	Főnix csarnok, Debrecen; Attendance: 1,500; Referees: Bócz, Wiedemann
16 April; 14:00	three players 3	(12–17)	Guardiola, Lékai 7	Főnix csarnok, Debrecen; Attendance: 1,500; Referees: Bócz, Wiedemann
16 April; 14:00	1× (yellow card) 2× (suspension)	Report	3× (yellow card) 1× (suspension)	Főnix csarnok, Debrecen; Attendance: 1,500; Referees: Bócz, Wiedemann

Third place

17 April; 13:45	Mezőkövesdi KC	25 – 27	Balatonfüredi KSE	Főnix csarnok, Debrecen; Attendance: 4,000; Referees: Tomecskó-Hunyadi, Unyatinszki
17 April; 13:45	Hajdu 6	(10–14)	Győri 9	Főnix csarnok, Debrecen; Attendance: 4,000; Referees: Tomecskó-Hunyadi, Unyatinszki
17 April; 13:45	3× (yellow card) 7× (suspension)	Report	2× (yellow card) 7× (suspension) 1× (red card)	Főnix csarnok, Debrecen; Attendance: 4,000; Referees: Tomecskó-Hunyadi, Unyatinszki

Final

17 April; 16:00	MOL-Pick Szeged	24 – 24 (pen. 2–3)	MVM Veszprém	Főnix csarnok, Debrecen; Attendance: 5,000; Referees: Kékes, Kékes
17 April; 16:00	Källman 7	(12–10)	Pálmarsson, Nagy 6	Főnix csarnok, Debrecen; Attendance: 5,000; Referees: Kékes, Kékes
17 April; 16:00	3× (yellow card) 3× (suspension)	Report	3× (yellow card) 2× (suspension)	Főnix csarnok, Debrecen; Attendance: 5,000; Referees: Kékes, Kékes

2015-16 Magyar Kupa
Winner

MVM Veszprém
25th Title

Mirko Alilović, Roland Mikler, Chema Rodríguez, Isaías Guardiola, Péter Gulyás, Gergő Iváncsik, Máté Lékai, Gašper Marguč, László Nagy (c), Andreas Nilsson, Aron Pálmarsson, Timuzsin Schuch, Ivan Slišković, Renato Sulić, Mirsad Terzić, Cristian Ugalde
Head coach
Xavier Sabaté

==== Final standings ====
	Team
Gold medal	MVM Veszprém
Silver medal	MOL-Pick Szeged
Bronze medal	Balatonfüredi KSE
	Mezőkövesdi KC

== See also ==
- 2015–16 Nemzeti Bajnokság I
