= 2017–18 Nemzeti Bajnokság I (men's handball) =

K&H férfi liga
- Season: 2017–18
- Champions: MOL-Pick Szeged (3rd title)
- Relegated: Váci KSE; Orosházi FKSE
- Champions League: MOL-Pick Szeged; Telekom Veszprém
- EHF Cup: Grundfos Tatabánya KC; Balatonfüredi KSE; Sport36-Komló
- Matches: 184
- Goals: 9,722 (52.84 per match)
- Top goalscorer: Marko Vasić (173 goals)
- Biggest home win: Veszprém 41–15 Cegléd (13 December 2017)
- Biggest away win: Orosháza 21–40 Veszprém (12 September 2017); Budakalász 25–44 Veszprém (6 December 2017)
- Highest scoring: FTC 36–39 Balatonfüred (28 April 2018)

The 2017–18 Nemzeti Bajnokság I (known as the K&H férfi kézilabda liga for sponsorship reasons) is the 67th season of the Nemzeti Bajnokság I, Hungarian premier Handball league.

== Teams ==
As in the previous season, 14 teams played in the 2017–18 season. After the 2016–17 season, Balmazújvárosi KK and Mezőkövesdi KC were relegated to the 2017–18 Nemzeti Bajnokság I/B. They were replaced by two clubs from the 2016–17 Nemzeti Bajnokság I/B, Ferencvárosi TC and Dabas KK.

Location of teams in 2017–18 Nemzeti Bajnokság I

Team	Location	Arena	Capacity
Balatonfüredi KSE	Balatonfüred	Balatonfüredi Szabadidőközpont	712
Budakalász FKC	Budakalász	Budakalászi Sportcsarnok	400
Ceglédi KKSE	Cegléd	Gál József Sportcsarnok	1,046
Csurgói KK	Csurgó	Sótonyi László Sportcsarnok	1,200
Dabas VSE KC	Dabas	OBO Aréna	1,920
Eger-Eszterházy SzSE	Eger	Kemény Ferenc Sportcsarnok	875
Ferencvárosi TC	Budapest, IX. ker	Elek Gyula Aréna	1,300
Gyöngyösi KK	Gyöngyös	Dr. Fejes András Sportcsarnok	1,500
Komlói BSK	Komló	Komlói Sportközpont	800
Orosházi FKSE	Orosháza	Eötvös Sportcsarnok	900
SC Pick Szeged	Szeged	Újszegedi Sportcsarnok	3,200
Tatabánya KC	Tatabánya	Földi Imre Sportcsarnok	1,000
Váci KSE	Vác	Városi Sportcsarnok	800
Veszprém KC	Veszprém	Veszprém Aréna	5,096

=== Personnel and kits ===
Following is the list of clubs competing in 2017–18 Nemzeti Bajnokság I, with their president, head coach, kit manufacturer and shirt sponsor.

Team	President	Head coach	Kit manufacturer	Shirt sponsor(s)
Balatonfüred	László Csima	(Hungary) István Csoknyai	Erima	tippmix^{1}, Sennebogen, 77 Elektronika, Kinizsi Bank
Budakalász	Gábor Hajdu	(Hungary) Gyula Forgács	adidas	tippmix^{1}, Swietelsky
Cegléd	István Borsos	(Hungary) László Jakab	hummel	tippmix^{1}
Csurgó	János Varga	(Hungary) József Bencze	hummel	tippmix^{1}, PriMont, Dráva-Coop
Dabas	Csaba Prohászka	(Hungary) Győző Tomori	hummel	tippmix^{1}, OBO,
Eger-Eszterházy	Róbert Szabó	(Hungary) Edmond Tóth	hummel	tippmix^{1}, SBS, Hesi, Eger
Ferencváros	Gábor Kubatov	(Hungary) Attila Horváth	Nike	tippmix^{1}, Budapest
Gyöngyös	Zsolt Marczin	(Hungary) Csaba Konkoly	Salming	B. Braun, tippmix^{1}, HE-DO
Komlói BSK	Szabolcs Szigeti	(Hungary) Bálint Klivinger	Zeus	tippmix^{1}, Sport36 Komló
Orosháza	Tamás Vájer	(Hungary) Botond Bakó	Kappa	tippmix^{1}, Linamar
Szeged	Nándor Szögi	(Spain) Juan Carlos Pastor	adidas	MOL, tippmix^{1}, Pick, OTP Bank, Protocall
Tatabánya	László Marosi	(Serbia) Vladan Matić	Jako	tippmix^{1}, Grundfos
Vác	Dr. Attila Schoffer	(Hungary) László Skaliczki	adidas	tippmix^{1}
Veszprém	Gábor Kálomista	(Sweden) Ljubomir Vranjes	hummel	Veszprém, Telekom, tippmix^{1}, XIXO

==== Managerial changes ====
Team	Outgoing manager	Manner of departure	Date of vacancy	Position in table	Replaced by	Date of appointment
Veszprém	(Spain) Xavi Sabaté	End of contract	End of 2016–17 season	Pre-season	(Sweden) Ljubomir Vranjes	1 July 2017
Gyöngyös	(Hungary) Tibor Nigrinyi	Mutual consent	End of 2016–17 season	Pre-season	(Hungary) Csaba Konkoly	1 July 2017
Budakalász	(Hungary) Attila Horváth	Working as a consultant	27 September 2017	6th	(Hungary) Gyula Forgács	28 September 2017
Csurgó	(Hungary) László Sótonyi	Resigned	16 October 2017	10th	(Hungary) József Bencze (caretaker)	17 October 2017
Ferencváros	(Hungary) Gábor Adorján	Mutual consent	11 December 2017	14th	(Hungary) Attila Horváth	11 December 2017
Orosháza	(Hungary) Dániel Buday	Sacked	21 December 2017	14th	(Hungary) Botond Bakó	27 December 2017
Vác	(Hungary) Péter Gúnya	Working as a consultant	27 December 2017	13th	(Hungary) László Skaliczki	1 January 2018
Cegléd	(Hungary) Károly Nagy	Mutual consent	31 December 2017	10th	(Hungary) László Jakab	1 January 2018

== League table ==
Pos	Team	Pld	W	D	L	GF	GA	GD	Pts	Qualification or relegation
1	Telekom Veszprém	26	25	0	1	906	566	+340	50	Qualification to the Finals
2	MOL-Pick Szeged	26	22	2	2	854	632	+222	46	Qualification to the Finals
3	Grundfos Tatabánya KC	26	20	2	4	722	622	+100	42	Qualification to EHF Cup third qualifying round
4	Balatonfüredi KSE	26	20	0	6	718	651	+67	40	Qualification to EHF Cup third qualifying round
5	Sport36-Komló	26	12	2	12	632	665	−33	26	Qualification to EHF Cup second qualifying round
6	Csurgói KK	26	11	3	12	684	717	−33	25	
7	CYEB Budakalász	26	10	4	12	730	756	−26	24	
8	Dabas VSE KC	26	9	2	15	628	730	−102	20	
9	Eger SBS Eszterházy	26	9	1	16	613	673	−60	19	
10	Ceglédi KKSE	26	6	5	15	589	668	−79	17 (Note: Ceglédi KKSE is ahead of B. Braun Gyöngyös on head-to-head results: Cegléd–Gyöngyös 24–22, Gyöngyös–Cegléd 24–27.)	
11	B. Braun Gyöngyös	26	6	5	15	638	716	−78	17	
12	Ferencvárosi TC	26	7	2	17	647	747	−100	16 (Note: Ferencvárosi TC is ahead of Váci KSE on head-to-head results: FTC–Vác 24–23, Vác–FTC 26–28.)	
13	Váci KSE (R)	26	6	4	16	646	726	−80	16	Relegation to Nemzeti Bajnokság I/B
14	Orosházi FKSE- LINAMAR (R)	26	2	2	22	600	738	−138	6	Relegation to Nemzeti Bajnokság I/B

Updated to match(es) played on 8 May 2018. Source: keziszovettseg.hu
Rules for classification: 1) Points; 2) Head-to-head points; 3) Head-to-head goal difference; 4) Goal difference; 5) Goals scored; 6) Matches won; 7) Draw (Note: Head-to-head record is used only after all the matches between the teams in question have been played)
(R) Relegated

=== Schedule and results ===
In the table below the home teams are listed on the left and the away teams along the top.

Home \ Away	BKSE	BFKC	CEG	CSKK	DAB	EGER	FTC	GYKK	KBSK	OROS	SZEG	TAT	VÁC	VESZ
Balatonfüredi KSE		30–26	34–23	23–21	33–23	32–21	30–21	34–26	25–23	30–21	26–27	23–19	26–24	25–39
Budakalász FKC	29–25		18–18	25–25	27–29	30–28	39–33	25–26	30–28	30–29	26–33	25–29	29–24	25–44
Ceglédi KKSE	15–21	26–30		21–27	20–21	17–17	34–24	24–22	25–30	25–19	26–30	22–26	25–25	23–29
Csurgói KK	24–34	34–32	36–27		34–24	22–20	33–31	34–27	22–22	29–28	25–36	23–26	25–26	19–33
Dabas VSE KC	24–30	34–31	24–24	32–30		20–23	27–28	23–22	19–23	33–21	24–34	26–26	24–25	21–39
Eger-Eszterházy SzSE	17–24	29–26	20–21	25–26	31–25		26–21	25–21	25–26	27–25	24–33	24–28	23–21	26–31
Ferencvárosi TC	36–39	23–27	23–21	27–29	22–23	30–25		22–27	22–19	18–18	22–36	19–28	24–23	26–31
Gyöngyösi KK	24–31	30–30	24–27	27–27	30–24	20–23	26–26		26–26	26–25	33–33	20–23	27–33	18–31
Komlói BSK	23–25	27–26	15–23	23–22	25–26	24–18	28–22	25–21		26–20	27–37	25–28	29–24	24–32
Orosházi FKSE	22–27	26–29	22–18	32–27	23–26	25–28	22–25	23–33	24–25		20–36	27–33	29–29	21–40
SC Pick Szeged	31–21	35–35	34–18	32–24	39–21	32–15	34–25	36–18	38–24	35–21		28–25	35–21	21–30
Tatabánya KC	27–18	32–30	28–23	27–20	32–18	35–28	37–29	23–20	31–21	20–18	24–22		33–25	28–31
Váci KSE	25–26	24–25	28–28	26–31	24–20	27–26	26–28	24–25	22–27	26–19	26–35	29–29		18–36
Telekom Veszprém	40–26	35–25	41–15	31–15	34–17	31–19	39–20	39–19	32–17	37–20	31–32	28–25	42–21	

Legend: Blue = home team win; Yellow = draw; Red = away team win.

== Finals ==
Team 1	Agg.	Team 2	Game 1	Game 2
Telekom Veszprém (1)	57–58	MOL-Pick Szeged (2)	28–32	29–26

Game 1

12 May 2018; 13:00 (CEST)	MOL-Pick Szeged	32 – 28	Telekom Veszprém	Városi Sportcsarnok, Szeged; Attendance: 3,200; Referees: Herczeg, Südi
12 May 2018; 13:00 (CEST)	Sigurmannsson 6	(16–13)	Manaskov 6	Városi Sportcsarnok, Szeged; Attendance: 3,200; Referees: Herczeg, Südi
12 May 2018; 13:00 (CEST)	3× (yellow card) 5× (suspension)	Report	3× (yellow card) 2× (suspension)	Városi Sportcsarnok, Szeged; Attendance: 3,200; Referees: Herczeg, Südi

Game 2

20 May 2018; 15:00 (CEST)	Telekom Veszprém	29 – 26	MOL-Pick Szeged	Veszprém Aréna, Veszprém; Attendance: 5,000; Referees: Herczeg, Südi
20 May 2018; 15:00 (CEST)	Tønnesen 5	(14–17)	Bodó 7	Veszprém Aréna, Veszprém; Attendance: 5,000; Referees: Herczeg, Südi
20 May 2018; 15:00 (CEST)	3× (yellow card) 5× (suspension) 1× (red card)	Report	2× (yellow card) 5× (suspension)	Veszprém Aréna, Veszprém; Attendance: 5,000; Referees: Herczeg, Südi

MOL-Pick Szeged won the Finals, 58–57 on aggregate.

2017–18 Nemzeti Bajnokság I
Champion

3rd title

Sierra, Šego, M. Nagy (goalkeepers), Zs. Balogh, Bánhidi, Bodó, Blažević, Buntić, B. Fekete, M. Hegedűs, Gaber,
Gorbok, Källman (c), Pedro Rodríguez, Sigurmannsson, Skube, Sunajko, Šoštarič, Sršen, Thiagus Petrus, Zhitnikov, Zubai
Head coach: Juan Carlos Pastor, Assistant coach: Marko Krivokapić

== Season statistics ==
=== Top goalscorers ===
As of 8 May 2018.

Rank	Player	Team	Goals	Matches
1	(Serbia) Marko Vasić	Csurgó	173	26
2	(Hungary) Bence Nagy	Budakalász	170	26
3	(Montenegro) Miloš Vujović	Tatabánya	142	26
4	(Iceland) Stefán Rafn Sigurmannsson	Szeged	132	25
5	(Croatia) Srećko Jerković	Komlói BSK	120	24
6	(Hungary) József Holpert	Vác	118	26
7	(Montenegro) Igor Marković	Komlói BSK	117	25
8	(Sweden) Emil Berggren	Budakalász	107	22
9	(Russia) Inal Aflitulin	Eger	105	23
10	(Hungary) Richárd Bodó	Szeged	103	23

=== Attendances ===
Pos	Team	Total	High	Low	Average	Change
1	Telekom Veszprém	32,800	5,000 (vs. Szeged)	1,500 (three matches)	2,523	+39,01%
2	MOL-Pick Szeged	21,100	3,200 (vs. Veszprém)	500 (vs. Vác)	1,623	+12,16%
3	Dabas VSE KC	16,900	2,300 (vs. Veszprém)	1,000 (vs. Balatonfüred)	1,300	+151,45%^{1}
4	Grundfos Tatabánya KC	12,250	1,200 (two matches)	700 (vs. Gyöngyös)	942	+9,28%
5	Sport36-Komló	10,700	900 (five matches)	700 (two matches)	823	−4,19%
6	Csurgói KK	10,150	1,200 (vs. Veszprém)	600 (three matches)	781	+12,86%
6	B. Braun Gyöngyös	10,150	1,300 (vs. Veszprém)	600 (three matches)	781	+1,56%
8	Eger SBS Eszterházy	9,240	875 (vs. Veszprém)	600 (two matches)	711	−9,31%
9	Balatonfüredi KSE	7,200	800 (vs. Veszprém)	400 (three matches)	554	−1,95%
10	Ceglédi KKSE	6,800	900 (vs. Veszprém)	300 (vs. Komlói BSK)	523	−17,12%
11	Ferencvárosi TC	5,400	1,000 (vs. Veszprém)	200 (two matches)	415	+109,60%^{1}
12	Váci KSE	4,600	500 (vs. Veszprém)	300 (six matches)	354	−8,76%
13	Orosházi FKSE- LINAMAR	4,050	350 (nine matches)	200 (three matches)	312	−7,69%
14	CYEB Budakalász	2,820	220 (eleven matches)	200 (two matches)	217	−1,36%
Total		154,160	5,000 (VESZ vs. SZEG)	200 (seven matches)	847	+12,33%

Updated to games played on 7 May 2018. Source: League matches: NB I 2017/2018
Attendance numbers without playoff matches.

Notes

1: Team played last season in Nemzeti Bajnokság I/B.

=== Number of teams by counties ===
Pos.	County (megye)	No. of teams	Teams
1	Pest	4	Budakalász FKC, Dabas VSE KC, Ceglédi KKSE and Váci KSE
2	Heves	2	Eger-Eszterházy SzSE and Gyöngyösi KK
2	Veszprém	2	Balatonfüredi KSE and Telekom Veszprém
4	Baranya	1	Komlói BSK
4	Békés	1	Orosházi FKSE
4	Budapest (capital)	1	Ferencvárosi TC
4	Csongrád	1	MOL-Pick Szeged
4	Komárom-Esztergom	1	Tatabánya KC
4	Somogy	1	Csurgói KK

== See also ==
- 2017–18 Magyar Kupa
- 2017–18 Nemzeti Bajnokság I/B
- 2017–18 Nemzeti Bajnokság II
