= 2017–18 Nemzeti Bajnokság I/B (men's handball) =

NB I/B férfi felnőtt
- Season: 2017–18
- Promoted: Mezőkövesdi KC (East); Vecsés SE (West)
- Relegated: (East) (West)
- Matches played: 156 (East), 182 (West)
- Top goalscorer: Viktor Benke (173 goals) - East; Benedek Szakály (182 goals) - West

The 2017–18 Nemzeti Bajnokság I/B is the 50th season of the Nemzeti Bajnokság I/B, Hungary's second tier Handball league.

== Team information ==
There are 14–14 clubs in the 2 group, with three-three promoted teams from Nemzeti Bajnokság II.

=== Team changes ===
Promoted from 2016–17 Nemzeti Bajnokság II

- KK Ajka (North-west)
- Tatabánya KC (U20) (North)
- Debreceni EAC (North-east)

Relegated from 2016–17 Nemzeti Bajnokság I

- Balmazújvárosi KK
- Mezőkövesdi KC

Relegated to 2017–18 Nemzeti Bajnokság II

- Alba-MÁV-Előre (North-west)
- Tiszavasvári SE (North-east)
- Pénzügyőr SE (South)

Promoted to 2017–18 Nemzeti Bajnokság I

- Dabas VSE KC
- Ferencvárosi TC

=== Stadia and locations ===
Location of teams in 2017-18 Nemzeti Bajnokság I/B (West)
Location of teams in 2017-18 Nemzeti Bajnokság I/B (East)

==== Western Group ====
The following 14 clubs compete in the NB I/B (Western) during the 2017–18 season:

Team	Location	Arena
KK Ajka	Ajka	Városi Sportcentrum
Balatonfüredi KSE (U20)	Balatonfüred	Észak-Balatoni Konf. Központ
Csurgói KK (U20)	Csurgó	Sótonyi László Sportcsarnok
ETO - SZESE Győr FKC	Győr	Egyetemi Csarnok
NEKA	Balatonboglár	Urányi János Sportcsarnok
Pécsi VSE	Pécs	Lauber Dezső Sportcsarnok
PLER-Budapest	Budapest, XVIII. ker	Lőrinci Sportcsarnok
Százhalombattai KE	Százhalombatta	Városi Szabadidő Központ
Szigetszentmiklósi KSK	Szigetszentmiklós	Városi Sportcsarnok
Tatai AC	Tata	Güntner Aréna
Tatabánya KC (U20)	Tatabánya	Földi Imre Sportcsarnok
Vecsés SE	Vecsés	Városi Sportcsarnok
Veszprém KC (U20)	Veszprém	Március 15. úti Sportcsarnok
Veszprémi KSE	Veszprém	Március 15. úti Sportcsarnok

==== Eastern Group ====
The following 14 clubs compete in the NB I/B (Eastern) during the 2017–18 season:

Team	Location	Arena
FKSE Algyő	Algyő	Fehér Ignác Ált. Isk.
Balassagyarmati Kábel SE	Balassagyarmat	Városi Sportcsarnok
Balmazújvárosi KK	Balmazújváros	Kőnig Rendezvényközpont
Békési FKC	Békés	Városi Sportcsarnokban
Debreceni EAC	Debrecen	DEAC Egyetemi Sportcentrum
Kecskeméti TE	Kecskemét	Messzi István Sportcsarnok
Mezőkövesdi KC	Mezőkövesd	Városi Sportcsarnok
Mizse KC	Lajosmizse	Fekete István Ált. isk.
Nyíregyházi SN	Nyíregyháza	Continental Aréna
Ózdi KC	Ózd	Marosi István Sportcsarnok
SC Pick Szeged (U20)	Szeged	Városi stadion
Törökszentmiklósi KE	Törökszentmiklós	Városi Sportcsarnok
Törökszentmiklósi Székács	Törökszentmiklós	Székács Sportcsarnok

== League table ==
=== Western Group ===
Pos	Team	Pld	W	D	L	GF	GA	GD	Pts	Promotion or relegation
1	Vecsés SE ÉL-TEAM (C, P)	26	22	0	4	771	654	+117	44	Promotion to Nemzeti Bajnokság I
2	AGROFEED ETO-SZESE	26	20	2	4	709	602	+107	42	
3	PLER-Budapest	26	19	2	5	699	565	+134	40	
4	Veszprémi KSE	26	15	3	8	680	620	+60	33	
5	Telekom Veszprém (U20)	26	14	4	8	750	702	+48	32	
6	Szigetszentmiklósi KSK	26	14	1	11	682	659	+23	29	
7	Balatonfüredi KSE (U20)	26	12	3	11	685	648	+37	27	
8	NEKA	26	12	1	13	702	703	−1	25	
9	Pécsi VSE	26	12	0	14	655	656	−1	24	
10	Tatai AC	26	9	5	12	614	638	−24	23	
11	Százhalombattai KE	26	10	2	14	671	723	−52	22	
12	KK Ajka	26	5	2	19	636	701	−65	12	Relegation to Nemzeti Bajnokság II
13	Grundfos Tatabánya KC (U20)	26	4	1	21	597	750	−153	9	Relegation to Nemzeti Bajnokság II
14	Csurgói KK (U20)	26	1	0	25	589	819	−230	2	Relegation to Nemzeti Bajnokság II

(C) Champions; (P) Promoted

==== Schedule and results ====
In the table below the home teams are listed on the left and the away teams along the top.

Home \ Away	AJKA	BKSE	CSKK	GYŐR	NEKA	PVSE	PLER	SZÁZ	SZIG	TAC	TAT	VECS	VESZ	VKSE
KK Ajka		26–27	28–27	22–25	25–25	22–29	23–31	25–21	19–20	20–24	32–18	23–25	24–31	25–28
Balatonfüredi KSE (U20)	29–26		36–21	23–30	27–28	22–16	25–26	34–25	31–25	29–22	27–22	33–27	27–27	22–22
Csurgói KK (U20)	25–30	26–35		25–27	19–28	20–26	19–29	28–32	24–30	22–19	20–22	25–36	30–35	20–28
ETO - SZESE Győr FKC	28–21	28–25	29–17		29–27	29–25	21–19	37–19	29–17	32–25	33–21	23–27	26–26	28–30
NEKA	28–23	20–28	41–23	32–29		22–30	24–33	29–25	35–30	32–28	32–23	25–30	26–22	21–27
Pécsi VSE	36–32	27–21	29–18	23–22	31–26		21–28	30–29	25–20	23–25	26–16	30–29	21–24	21–24
PLER-Budapest	32–23	24–20	37–19	19–22	28–25	30–20		33–25	18–17	24–24	29–22	22–18	30–24	25–20
Százhalombattai KE	31–30	30–26	24–22	17–24	23–24	27–22	24–23		26–25	22–22	27–20	30–32	31–34	20–20
Szigetszentmiklósi KSK	39–24	27–25	33–25	28–33	25–23	30–25	27–25	29–20		23–23	27–24	28–30	29–30	25–21
Tatai AC	21–21	19–20	35–23	18–22	29–26	28–27	17–28	21–28	23–19		32–21	26–29	25–35	19–19
Tatabánya KC (U20)	24–30	24–24	35–29	23–38	25–22	23–20	20–34	28–29	25–33	20–25		27–31	26–36	20–33
Vecsés SE	29–21	31–25	38–20	22–23	28–22	33–27	24–23	37–27	28–21	25–18	34–24		36–32	40–33
Telekom Veszprém (U20)	28–23	27–26	40–18	28–28	30–33	30–23	23–23	38–34	28–32	22–25	21–19	22–27		30–34
Veszprémi KSE	20–18	22–18	37–24	23–24	33–26	26–22	18–26	30–25	20–23	26–21	36–25	24–25	26–27	

Legend: Blue = home team win; Yellow = draw; Red = away team win.

=== Eastern Group ===
Pos	Team	Pld	W	D	L	GF	GA	GD	Pts	Promotion or relegation
1	Mezőkövesdi KC (C, P)	24	16	5	3	720	636	+84	37	Promotion to Nemzeti Bajnokság I
2	Békés-Drén KC	24	18	0	6	662	615	+47	36	
3	Balmazújvárosi KK	24	18	0	6	702	612	+90	36	
4	KTE-automatika.hu	24	13	5	6	628	591	+37	31	
5	Nyíregyházi SN	24	13	3	8	655	635	+20	29	
6	ContiTech FKSE-Algyő	24	12	3	9	686	681	+5	27	
7	Debreceni EAC	24	9	5	10	624	633	−9	23	
8	Balassagyarmati Kábel SE	24	9	3	12	651	644	+7	21	
9	ÓAM-Ózdi KC	24	8	3	13	635	644	−9	19	
10	Törökszentmiklósi Székács	24	6	6	12	637	691	−54	18	
11	Mizse KC	24	7	3	14	608	639	−31	17	
12	Törökszentmiklósi KE	24	3	6	15	636	711	−75	12	Relegation to Nemzeti Bajnokság II
13	MOL-Pick Szeged (U20)	24	3	0	21	593	705	−112	6	Relegation to Nemzeti Bajnokság II

(C) Champions; (P) Promoted

==== Schedule and results ====
In the table below the home teams are listed on the left and the away teams along the top.

Home \ Away	ALGY	Bgy	BKK	BFKC	DEAC	KTE	MKC	MIZSE	NYÍR	ÓZD	SZEG	TKE	TSZÉK
FKSE Algyő		33–33	23–30	29–26	28–21	26–26	31–33	33–29	23–29	23–23	27–23	30–24	35–28
Balassagyarmati Kábel SE	31–29		26–29	26–28	25–22	27–26	22–27	32–23	27–27	27–27	27–26	36–25	36–29
Balmazújvárosi KK	29–25	31–28		27–29	25–23	27–31	38–27	35–25	35–26	31–28	35–25	30–20	19–20
Békési FKC	25–20	31–28	25–24		31–29	29–28	19–18	30–23	27–18	33–29	25–18	40–28	26–21
Debreceni EAC	32–33	24–22	24–30	30–23		26–28	24–25	26–26	29–26	24–23	29–24	28–28	38–27
Kecskeméti TE	26–27	28–27	22–25	29–21	28–24		23–23	24–25	26–30	29–26	25–20	23–20	28–21
Mezőkövesdi KC	30–25	32–27	30–26	35–30	36–21	25–25		26–26	38–25	35–29	34–29	35–27	34–23
Mizse KC	21–24	24–29	20–24	22–27	27–27	18–22	32–34		18–20	24–21	30–24	34–28	24–27
Nyíregyházi SN	33–27	24–22	28–26	26–23	20–20	25–28	31–35	28–25		22–26	38–22	21–21	29–21
Ózdi KC	27–31	23–21	27–29	27–25	23–24	26–28	30–27	29–31	26–32		29–19	29–25	28–32
SC Pick Szeged (U20)	30–34	26–25	25–31	29–30	23–26	25–27	21–29	19–27	30–34	25–26		29–27	31–27
Törökszentmiklósi KE	34–35	26–22	27–35	26–32	26–27	25–25	24–24	28–26	29–34	25–31	31–23		34–34
Törökszentmiklósi Székács KE	38–35	24–25	28–31	25–27	26–26	23–23	28–28	22–28	31–29	22–22	32–27	28–28	

Legend: Blue = home team win; Yellow = draw; Red = away team win.

== See also ==
- 2017–18 Magyar Kupa
- 2017–18 Nemzeti Bajnokság I
- 2017–18 Nemzeti Bajnokság II
