= Mezőkövesdi KC =

Hungarian handball club

- Full name: Mezőkövesdi Kézilabda Club
- Short name: MKC
- Founded: 1993
- Arena: Városi Sportcsarnok, Mezőkövesd
- Capacity: 850 seats
- Club colours
Home	Away

Mezőkövesdi Kézilabda Club is a Hungarian handball club from Mezőkövesd, that played in the Nemzeti Bajnokság I, the top level championship in Hungary.

Location of Mezőkövesdi KC

== Crest, colours, supporters ==
=== Naming history ===
Name	Period
Mezőkövesdi KC	1993–present

=== Kit manufacturers and Shirt sponsor ===
The following table shows in detail Mezőkövesdi Kézilabda Club kit manufacturers and shirt sponsors by year:

Kit manufacturers

Period	Kit manufacturer
– 2011	(Italy) Mass
2011–2014	(Germany) Kempa
2014–2019	(Germany) Erima
2019 – present	(Denmark) Hummel

Shirt sponsor

Period	Sponsor
2010–2013	Mátrai Erőmű Zrt. / Mezőkövesd / Technical Parts AG / Wiktori Kft. / Kovács Vegyesipari Kereskedelmi és Szolgáltató Kft. / Mezőkövesdi Városgazdálkodási Rt.
2013–2014	Mátrai Erőmű Zrt. / Mezőkövesd / Mezőkövesdi Városgazdálkodási Zrt.
2014–2015	Mezőkövesd / Mezőkövesdi Városgazdálkodási Zrt.
2015–2016	Mezőkövesd / Mezőkövesdi Városgazdálkodási Zrt. / Szerencsejáték Zrt.
2016–2017	Mezőkövesd / Mezőkövesdi Városgazdálkodási Zrt. / tippmixPro
2017–2018	Mezőkövesd / Mezőkövesdi Városgazdálkodási Zrt.
2018–2019	Mezőkövesd / tippmix / Kovács Vegyesipari Kereskedelmi és Szolgáltató Kft. / Balneo Hotel Zsori Thermal & Wellness
2019–2020	Mezőkövesd / tippmix
2020 – present	Mezőkövesd

=== Kits ===
HOME
2018–19	2019–20	2021–

AWAY
2018–19	2019–20	2020–21	2021–22

THIRD
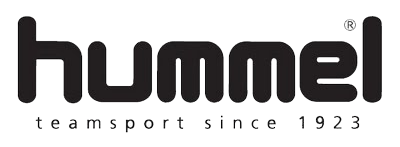
2020–

=== Supporters and rivalries ===
The supporters of the club are based in Mezőkövesd, in Borsod-Abaúj-Zemplén County, Hungary.

- Mezőkövesdi KC's arch-rival is the neighbouring club Eger-Eszterházy SzSE and games between the clubs are considered as the "Bükkaljai derbi".
- Mezőkövesdi KC's arch-rival is the neighbouring club Gyöngyösi KK and games between the clubs.

== Sports Hall information ==
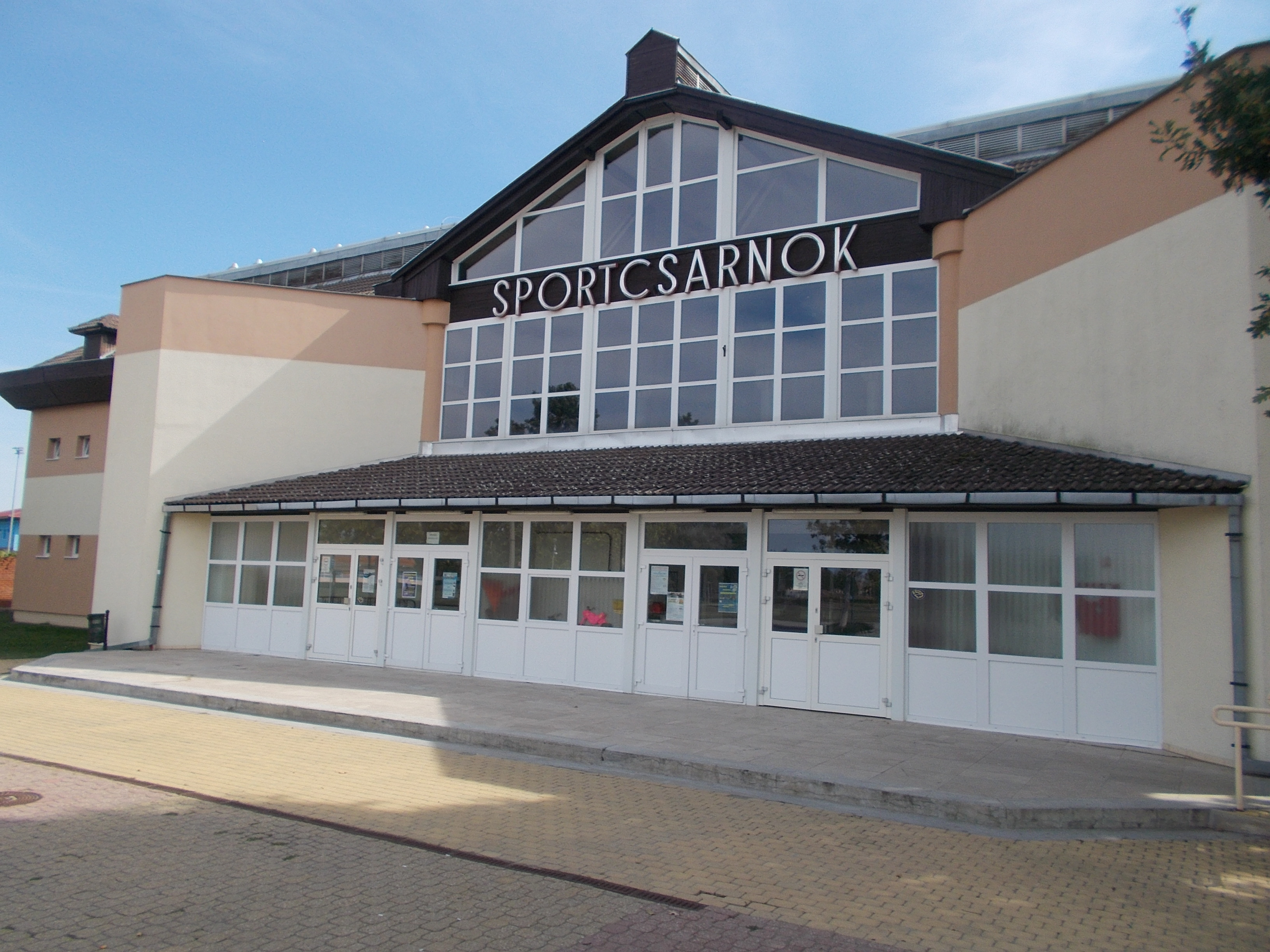
Home hall: Városi Sportcsarnok

- Name: – Városi Sportcsarnok
- City: – Mezőkövesd
- Capacity: – 850
- Address: – 3400 Mezőkövesd, Kavicsos tó út 9.

== Management ==
Position	Name
President	(Hungary) Tamás Pap
Vice President	(Hungary) Lajos Csiger
Vice President	(Hungary) Péter Drizner
Member Of The Board	(Hungary) Szabolcs Pap
Member Of The Board	(Hungary) Dr. Béla Hedrik
Technical Manager	(Hungary) Roland Nagy
Technical Manager	(Hungary) Gábor Bertha

== Team ==
=== Current squad ===
Squad for the 2022–23 season

Mezőkövesdi KC

Goalkeepers

- 1 (Hungary) Patrik Pelyhe
- 16 (Hungary) Henrik Hudák
- 32 (Hungary) Péter Ulicsinyi

Left Wingers

- 4 (Hungary) Balázs Sárosi
- 25 (Hungary) Dániel Szabó

Right Wingers

- 29 (Hungary) Norbert Nagy

Line Players

- 2 (Hungary) Ákos Sándor
- 11 (Hungary) János Nyitrai
- 56 (Hungary) Sándor Dobi

Central Backs

- 19 (Hungary) Lóránd László Horváth
- 28 (Hungary) Marcell Kocsis
- 31 (Hungary) Botond Zelei
- 44 (Hungary) Árpád Dócs

Left Backs
Right Backs

- 24 (Hungary) Richárd Kátai

=== Technical staff ===
- Head Coach: (Hungary) Péter Drizner
- Masseur: (Hungary) Ágnes Póta Lázárné

=== Transfers ===
Transfers for the 2022–23 season

Joining

Leaving

- (Hungary) Kristóf Csörgő (CB) to (Hungary) Ferencvárosi TC

Transfers for the 2021–22 season

Joining

- (Hungary) Dominik Nagy (GK) from (Hungary) Ózdi KC
- (Hungary) Sándor Dobi (LP) from (Hungary) Sport36-Komló
- (Hungary) Richárd Kátai (RB) from (Hungary) Kecskeméti TE
- (Hungary) János Nyitrai (LP) from (Hungary) Nyíregyházi SC

Leaving

- (Hungary) Imre Pásztor (GK) to (Hungary) Sport36-Komló
- (Hungary) Olivér Szöllősi (LP) to (Hungary) Sport36-Komló
- (Hungary) Bence Kovács (LB) to (Hungary) Orosházi FKSE
- (Hungary) Dániel Fekete (LB) to (Hungary) Füzesabonyi SC
- (Hungary) Bálint Rosta (LP) loan back to (Hungary) Gyöngyösi KK

Transfers for the 2020–21 season

Joining

- (Hungary) Dániel Fekete (LB) from (Germany) SV Blau-Weiss 1893 Goldbach/Hochheim
- (Hungary) Tamás Boda (LB) from (Hungary) Békési FKC
- (Hungary) István Varga (GK) from (Hungary) Veszprém KKFT Felsőörs
- (Hungary) Bálint Rosta (LP) on loan from (Hungary) Gyöngyösi KK

Leaving

- (Croatia) Tomislav Radnić (CB) to (Hungary) Budakalász FKC
- (Serbia) Milos Mojsilov (GK) to (Germany) TuS Vinnhorst
- (Bosnia and Herzegovina) Faruk Halilbegović (LB) to (Serbia) RK Vojvodina
- (Bosnia and Herzegovina) Stanko Stanković (RB) to (Greece) AC Diomidis Argous
- (Brazil) Henrique Pedro Martins (LP) to (Portugal) Vitória Setúbal
- (Hungary) László Horváth (CB) to (Hungary) Balatonfüredi KSE
- (Hungary) Máté Dávid (LP) to (Hungary) Budakalász FKC
- (Hungary) Martin Varjú (RW) to (Hungary) Budakalász FKC
- (Hungary) Máté Menyhárt (LW) to (Hungary) Budai Farkasok KKUK

Transfers for the 2019–20 season

Joining

- (Serbia) Milos Mojsilov (GK) from (Hungary) Ceglédi KKSE
- (Hungary) Olivér Szöllősi (LP) from (Hungary) Balatonfüredi KSE
- (Hungary) Martin Varjú (RW) from (Hungary) Csurgói KK

Leaving

- (Serbia) Predrag Rodić (LB) to (Serbia) RK Crvena Zvezda
- (Hungary) Norbert Jóga (LP) to (Hungary) Sport36-Komló
- (Hungary) Bence Mikita (CB) to (Hungary) Dabas KK
- (Hungary) Péter Kovács (RW) to (Hungary) Hatvani KSZSE
- (Hungary) Koppány Tóth (GK) to (Hungary) Ózdi KC
- (Hungary) Kristóf Győri (GK) loan back to (Hungary) NEKA

Transfers for the 2018–19 season

Joining

- (Croatia) Tomislav Radnić (CB) from (Hungary) Ceglédi KKSE
- (Bosnia and Herzegovina) Stanko Stanković (RB) from (Romania) AHC Dunărea Călărași
- (Serbia) Predrag Rodić (LB) from (Serbia) RK Jugović
- (Brazil) Henrique Pedro Martins (LP) from (Hungary) Gyöngyösi KK
- (Montenegro) Filip Krivokapić (CB) from (Montenegro) RK Lovćen
- (Hungary) László Horváth (CB) from (Hungary) Balatonfüredi KSE
- (Hungary) Máté Dávid (LP) from (Hungary) Ceglédi KKSE
- (Hungary) Bálint Gulácsi (LB) from (Hungary) Bőcs KSC
- (Hungary) Péter Kovács (RW) from (Hungary) Békési FKC
- (Hungary) Kristóf Győri (GK) on loan from (Hungary) NEKA
- (Bosnia and Herzegovina) Faruk Halilbegović (LB) from (Turkey) Selka Eskişehir SK
- (Hungary) Bence Mikita (CB) from (Hungary) Ferencvárosi TC

Leaving

- (Serbia) Nebojsa Vojinovic (LB) to (Hungary) Váci KSE
- (Hungary) Ákos Sándor (LP) to (Hungary) Balassagyarmati Kábel SE
- (Hungary) József Padla (RB) to (Hungary) Hatvani KSZSE
- (Montenegro) Filip Krivokapić (CB) to (North Macedonia) GRK Ohrid

Transfers for the 2017–18 season

Joining

- (Serbia) Nebojsa Vojinovic (LB) from (Serbia) MRK Požarevac
- (Hungary) Ákos Sándor (LP) from (Hungary) Nyíregyházi SC
- (Hungary) Nándor Jancsó (RW) from (Hungary) Tatai AC
- (Hungary) Norbert Jóga (LP) from (Hungary) Gyöngyösi KK
- (Hungary) Máté Menyhárt (LW) from (Hungary) SBS-Eger
- (Hungary) Botond Zelei (CB) from (Hungary) PLER KC
- (Hungary) József Padla (RB) from (Hungary) Ózdi KC
- (Hungary) Koppány Tóth (GK) from (Hungary) Ózdi KC
- (Hungary) Imre Pásztor (GK) from (Hungary) Balmazújvárosi KK

Leaving

- (Croatia) Tomislav Radnić (CB) to (Hungary) Ceglédi KKSE
- (Croatia) Marko Vukić (LB)
- (Serbia) Darko Trivković (LP)
- (Russia) Aleksey Grigoriev (RB)
- (Hungary) István Szepesi (LW) to (Hungary) SBS-Eger
- (Hungary) Péter Vaskó (RW) to (Hungary) SBS-Eger
- (Hungary) Balázs Holló (GK) to (Hungary) Dabas KK
- (Hungary) Gergő Lókodi (LB) to (Hungary) Dabas KK
- (Hungary) Péter Grünfelder (LP) to (Hungary) Sport36-Komló
- (Hungary) Roland Kiss (CB) to (Hungary) Balmazújvárosi KK
- (Hungary) Norbert Nagy (RW) to (Hungary) Balmazújvárosi KK
- (Hungary) János Kovács (GK) to (Hungary) Balmazújvárosi KK
- (Hungary) Gábor Pordán (RB) to (Hungary) SZESE Győr
- (Hungary) Máté Gulás (CB)
- (Belarus) Artsiom Selvasiuk (LP) loan back to (Belarus) HC Meshkov Brest

Transfers for the 2016–17 season

Joining

- (Croatia) Marko Vukić (LB) from (Croatia) RK Zagreb
- (Hungary) Péter Vaskó (RW) from (Hungary) Grundfos Tatabánya KC
- (Hungary) Gergő Lókodi (LB) from (Hungary) PLER KC
- (Hungary) János Kovács (GK) from (Hungary) SBS-Eger
- (Hungary) Norbert Nagy (RW) from (Hungary) Ferencvárosi TC
- (Hungary) Gábor Pordán (RB) from (Hungary) Balatonfüredi KSE
- (Hungary) Máté Gulás (CB) from (Hungary) Veszprém KKFT Felsőörs
- (Belarus) Artsiom Selvasiuk (LP) on loan from (Belarus) HC Meshkov Brest

Leaving

- (Japan) Atsushi Mekaru (CB) to (Spain) BM Puente Genil
- (Serbia) Dušan Bozoljac (LB) to (Norway) Runar Sandefjord
- (Hungary) Gábor Hajdú (LB) to (Austria) SG Handball West Wien
- (Hungary) Szabolcs Antal (LP) to (Hungary) Orosházi FKSE
- (Hungary) Bence Benis (RW) to (Hungary) Ferencvárosi TC
- (Hungary) Ferenc Molnár (LP) (retires)
- (Hungary) Péter Kovács (RW) to (Hungary) Békési FKC
- (Hungary) Tibor Balogh (GK) loan back to (Hungary) Csurgói KK
- (Hungary) Attila Füstös (LB) loan back to (Hungary) Csurgói KK

Transfers for the 2015–16 season

Joining

- (Croatia) Jure Kozina (RB) from (Croatia) RK Metković
- (Hungary) Gábor Hajdú (LB) from (Hungary) Gyöngyösi KK
- (Hungary) Szabolcs Antal (LP) from (Hungary) Ceglédi KKSE
- (Hungary) Bence Benis (RW) from (Hungary) Orosházi FKSE
- (Japan) Atsushi Mekaru (CB) from (Hungary) Nyíregyházi SC
- (Russia) Aleksey Grigoriev (RB) from (Romania) AHC Potaissa Turda
- (Serbia) Dušan Bozoljac (LB) from (Turkey) Medical Park Antalyaspor
- (Hungary) Attila Füstös (LB) on loan from (Hungary) Csurgói KK
- (Hungary) Tibor Balogh (GK) on loan from (Hungary) Csurgói KK

Leaving

- (Serbia) Stefan Ilić (LB) to (Serbia) RK Metaloplastika
- (Croatia) Rudolf Ćužić (CB) to (Italy) Handball Carpi
- (Belarus) Stanislav Nakhaenko (LP) to (Hungary) Sport36-Komló
- (Hungary) (Serbia) Marko Vasić (RW) to (Hungary) Váci KSE
- (Hungary) Zoltán Terenyi (RW) to (Hungary) Váci KSE
- (Hungary) Gábor Pálos (LW) to (Denmark) Vesthimmerland
- (Hungary) Gergő Lókodi (LB) to (Hungary) PLER KC
- (Hungary) Szilveszter Liszkai (GK) to Tremblay en France
- (Croatia) (Italy) Mate Volarević (GK) to (Italy) SSV Bozen
- (Croatia) Jure Kozina (RB) to (Croatia) RK Split
- (Serbia) Aleksandar Ćirić (LB) to (Hungary) Százhalombattai KE

Transfers for the 2014–15 season

Joining

- (Hungary) (Serbia) Marko Vasić (RW) from (Serbia) RK Jugović
- (Croatia) (Italy) Mate Volarević (GK) from (Croatia) RK Metković
- (Bosnia and Herzegovina) Nikola Džono (RB) from (Poland) Stal Mielec
- (Belarus) Stanislav Nakhaenko (LP) from (Belarus) HC Dinamo Minsk
- (Iran) Saeid Pourghasemi (LB)
- (Hungary) Szilveszter Liszkai (GK) from (Hungary) Gyöngyösi KK
- (Hungary) Gergő Lókodi (LB) from (Hungary) PLER KC
- (Hungary) Gábor Pálos (LW) from (Hungary) SBS-Eger
- (Hungary) Zoltán Terenyi (RW) from (Hungary) ETO-SZESE Győr
- (Hungary) Balázs Holló (GK) from (Hungary) Szentendrei KC
- (Serbia) Stefan Ilić (LB) from (Serbia) RK Jugović
- (Serbia) Aleksandar Ćirić (LB)

Leaving

- (Serbia) Goran Đukić (RB)
- (Hungary) Bence Benis (RW) to (Hungary) Orosházi FKSE
- (Hungary) Zsolt Dobó (LB) to (Hungary) SBS-Eger
- (Hungary) János Kovács (GK) to (Hungary) SBS-Eger
- (Hungary) Olivér Kiss (GK) to (Hungary) FKSE Algyő
- (Hungary) László Kurbely (RB) to (Hungary) Nyíregyházi SC
- (Hungary) Ádám Bakos (RW) to (Germany) TV 08 Willstätt
- (Bosnia and Herzegovina) Nikola Džono (RB) to (Hungary) Balmazújvárosi KK
- (Iran) Saeid Pourghasemi (LB)
- (Croatia) Matija Pavlović (LB)

Transfers for the 2013–14 season

Joining

- (Serbia) Goran Đukić (RB) from (Hungary) Orosházi FKSE
- (Slovakia) Tomáš Szűcs (LB) from (Hungary) PLER KC
- (Hungary) István Szepesi (LW) from (Hungary) Pécsi VSE
- (Hungary) Péter Grünfelder (LP) from (Hungary) Pécsi VSE
- (Hungary) László Kurbely (RB) from (Hungary) Pécsi VSE
- (Hungary) Zsolt Dobó (LB) from (Hungary) Ceglédi KKSE
- (Hungary) Olivér Kiss (GK) from (Hungary) Grundfos Tatabánya KC
- (Croatia) Rudolf Ćužić (CB) from (Croatia) RK Poreč
- (Croatia) Tomislav Radnić (CB) from (Croatia) RK Medveščak
- (Croatia) Matija Pavlović (LB) from (Croatia) MRK Dugo Selo
- (Hungary) Ádám Bakos (RW) from (Hungary) Váci KSE

Leaving

- (Slovakia) Marek Kovácech (RB) to (Hungary) Balmazújvárosi KK
- (Hungary) Koppány Tóth (GK) to (Hungary) Ózdi KC
- (Hungary) Csaba Nyikes (LB) to (Hungary) Ózdi KC
- (Hungary) Dániel Fekete (LB) to (Germany) SV Blau-Weiss 1893 Goldbach/Hochheim
- (Hungary) Attila Varga (CB) to (Hungary) Mezőtúri AFC
- (Slovakia) Marian Kleis (LW) to (Hungary) Nyíregyházi SC
- (Slovakia) Tomáš Szűcs (LB) to (Slovakia) HKM Sala
- (Hungary) László Fekete (LB) to (Hungary) Ózdi KC
- (Hungary) Patrik Gyuris (LP) to (Hungary) Kecskeméti TE

== Previous Squads ==
2018–2019 Team
Shirt No	Nationality	Player	Birth Date	Position
1	Hungary	Patrik Pelyhe	1 June 2001 (age 24)	Goalkeeper
2	Hungary	Nándor Jancsó	3 September 1995 (age 30)	Right Winger
3	Hungary	Bence Kovács	15 June 1996 (age 29)	Left Back
5	Hungary	Norbert Jóga	20 July 1996 (age 29)	Line Player
6	Montenegro	Filip Krivokapić	11 February 1996 (age 30)	Central Back
7	Serbia	Predrag Rodić	9 April 1996 (age 30)	Left Back
10	Croatia	Tomislav Radnić	7 January 1990 (age 36)	Central Back
11	Hungary	Péter Kovács	12 August 1994 (age 31)	Right Winger
12	Hungary	Koppány Tóth	1 August 1988 (age 37)	Goalkeeper
13	Bosnia and Herzegovina	Faruk Halilbegović	7 September 1987 (age 38)	Left Back
14	Hungary	László Horváth	22 September 1998 (age 27)	Central Back
16	Hungary	Imre Pásztor	23 July 1996 (age 29)	Goalkeeper
22	Bosnia and Herzegovina	Stanko Stanković	14 November 1989 (age 36)	Right Back
24	Hungary	Bálint Gulácsi	8 April 2001 (age 25)	Left Back
25	Hungary	Dániel Szabó	9 November 2000 (age 25)	Left Winger
31	Hungary	Botond Zelei	18 December 1997 (age 28)	Central Back
35	Brazil	Henrique Pedro Martins	20 February 1995 (age 31)	Line Player
66	Hungary	Bence Mikita	13 December 1997 (age 28)	Central Back
67	Hungary	Kristóf Győri	25 June 2000 (age 25)	Goalkeeper
95	Hungary	Máté Menyhárt	3 March 1995 (age 31)	Left Winger
99	Hungary	Máté Dávid	24 September 1996 (age 29)	Line Player

2015–2016 Team
Shirt No	Nationality	Player	Birth Date	Position
1	CroatiaItaly	Mate Volarević	4 June 1992 (age 33)	Goalkeeper
3	Hungary	Bence Kovács	15 June 1996 (age 29)	Left Back
5	Hungary	István Szepesi	25 February 1990 (age 36)	Left Winger
9	Hungary	Attila Füstös	22 September 1994 (age 31)	Left Back
10	Hungary	Roland Kiss	9 March 1997 (age 29)	Central Back
11	Hungary	Péter Grünfelder	27 January 1991 (age 35)	Line Player
12	Hungary	Balázs Holló	26 March 1992 (age 34)	Goalkeeper
13	Hungary	Gábor Hajdú	20 October 1989 (age 36)	Left Back
15	Croatia	Tomislav Radnić	7 January 1990 (age 36)	Central Back
19	Japan	Atsushi Mekaru	3 April 1985 (age 41)	Central Back
20	Hungary	Tibor Balogh	25 September 1993 (age 32)	Goalkeeper
21	Hungary	Szabolcs Antal	7 July 1990 (age 35)	Line Player
22	Hungary	Péter Kovács	12 August 1994 (age 31)	Right Winger
23	Hungary	Ferenc Molnár	4 March 1982 (age 44)	Line Player
24	Hungary	Bence Benis	22 February 1989 (age 37)	Right Winger
25	Serbia	Darko Trivković	1 May 1983 (age 42)	Line Player
32	Hungary	Szilveszter Liszkai	1 March 1987 (age 39)	Goalkeeper
33	Russia	Aleksey Grigoriev	19 February 1983 (age 43)	Right Back
39	Serbia	Dušan Bozoljac	5 January 1985 (age 41)	Left Back
71	Serbia	Aleksandar Ćirić	8 December 1993 (age 32)	Left Back
71	Hungary	János Nyitrai	10 September 1993 (age 32)	Line Player
77	Croatia	Jure Kozina	19 April 1992 (age 34)	Right Back

2014–2015 Team
Shirt No	Nationality	Player	Birth Date	Position
1	CroatiaItaly	Mate Volarević	4 June 1992 (age 33)	Goalkeeper
3	HungarySerbia	Marko Vasić	19 July 1989 (age 36)	Right Winger
5	Hungary	István Szepesi	25 February 1990 (age 36)	Left Winger
6	Serbia	Stefan Ilić	10 October 1992 (age 33)	Left Back
7	Croatia	Rudolf Ćužić	26 February 1985 (age 41)	Central Back
9	Hungary	Zoltán Terenyi	16 November 1991 (age 34)	Right Winger
10	Hungary	Gergő Lókodi	19 March 1989 (age 37)	Left Back
11	Hungary	Péter Grünfelder	27 January 1991 (age 35)	Line Player
12	Hungary	Balázs Holló	26 March 1992 (age 34)	Goalkeeper
15	Croatia	Tomislav Radnić	7 January 1990 (age 36)	Central Back
20	Hungary	Péter Sipos	5 November 1993 (age 32)	Goalkeeper
21	Hungary	Gábor Pálos	21 June 1985 (age 40)	Left Winger
22	Hungary	Péter Kovács	12 August 1994 (age 31)	Right Winger
23	Hungary	Ferenc Molnár	4 March 1982 (age 44)	Line Player
24	Croatia	Matija Pavlović	6 June 1994 (age 31)	Left Back
25	Serbia	Darko Trivković	1 May 1983 (age 42)	Line Player
32	Hungary	Szilveszter Liszkai	1 March 1987 (age 39)	Goalkeeper
39	Belarus	Stanislav Nakhaenko	20 April 1993 (age 33)	Line Player
71	Serbia	Aleksandar Ćirić	8 December 1993 (age 32)	Left Back
71	Iran	Saeid Pourghasemi	21 September 1986 (age 39)	Left Back
77	Bosnia and Herzegovina	Nikola Džono	14 January 1986 (age 40)	Right Back

== Top Scorers ==
Season	Player	Apps/Goals
2004–2005	(Hungary) Csaba Fügedi	19/111
2005–2006	(Hungary) Csaba Fügedi	24/139
2006–2007	(Hungary) Csaba Nyikes	26/170
2007–2008	(Hungary) László Fekete	28/138
2008–2009	(Hungary) László Fekete	32/201
2009–2010	(Hungary) László Fekete	27/151
2010–2011	(Hungary) László Fekete	29/149
2011–2012	(Hungary) László Fekete	27/87
2012–2013	(Slovakia) Marian Kleis	22/133
2013–2014	(Hungary) Bence Benis	34/136
2014–2015	(Hungary) Gergő Lókodi	30/112
2015–2016	(Hungary) István Szepesi	38/157
2016–2017	(Hungary) István Szepesi	26/107
2017–2018	(Hungary) Máté Menyhárt	24/132
2018–2019	(Bosnia and Herzegovina) Stanko Stanković	24/82
2019–2020	Cancelled	
2020–2021	(Hungary) Nándor Jancsó	21/138

== Honours ==
Honours	No.	Years
League
Nemzeti Bajnokság I/B Winners	2	2012–13, 2017–18
Nemzeti Bajnokság I/B Runners-up	1	2006–07
Nemzeti Bajnokság I/B Third Place	1	2005–06
Domestic Cups
Magyar Kupa Third Place	1	2014–15

== Recent seasons ==
As of 1 November 2017.

- Seasons in Nemzeti Bajnokság I: 9
- Seasons in Nemzeti Bajnokság I/B: 7
- Seasons in Nemzeti Bajnokság II: 8

Season	Division	Pos.	Magyar kupa
1993–94	County I	1st	
1994–95	NB II Északkelet	8th	
1995–96	NB II Északkelet	5th	
1996–97	NB II Északkelet	8th	
1997–98	NB II Északkelet	2nd	
1998–99	NB II Északkelet	4th	
1999-00	NB II Északkelet	6th	
2000–01	NB II Északkelet	3rd	
2001–02	NB II Északkelet	1st	
2002–03	NB I/B Kelet	10th	

Season	Division	Pos.	Magyar kupa
2003–04	NB I/B Kelet	9th	
2004–05	NB I/B Kelet	10th	
2005–06	NB I/B Kelet	3rd	
2006–07	NB I/B Kelet	2nd	
2007–08	NB I	13th	
2008–09	NB I	7th	
2009–10	NB I	10th	
2010–11	NB I	10th	Round 3
2011–12	NB I	11th	Round 3
2012–13	NB I/B Kelet	1st	Round 4

Season	Division	Pos.	Magyar kupa
2013–14	NB I	10th	Round 3
2014–15	NB I	8th	Third place
2015–16	NB I	8th	Fourth place
2016–17	NB I	14th	Round 4
2017–18	NB I/B Kelet	1st	Round 2
2018–19	NB I	12th	Round 5
2019–20	NB I	Cancelled	
2020–21	NB I/B Kelet	4th	Round 5
2021–22	NB I/B Kelet	17th	Round 3
2022–23	NB II Északkelet	1st	

== EHF ranking ==
As of 14/07/2022

Rank	Team	Points
286	(France) US Ivry Handball	3
287	(France) Tremblay Handball	3
288	(Turkey) Göztepe S.K.	3
289	(Hungary) Mezőkövesdi KC	3
290	(North Macedonia) HC Zomimak-M	3
291	(Poland) SPR Stal Mielec	3
292	(Spain) AD Ciudad de Guadalajara	3

== Former club members ==
=== Notable former players ===
- (Hungary) Ádám Bajorhegyi
- (Hungary) János Bécsi
- (Hungary) László Fekete
- (Hungary) Patrick Gyuris
- (Hungary) Gábor Hajdú
- (Hungary) Balázs Holló
- (Hungary) Károly Juhász
- (Hungary) Attila Kotormán
- (Hungary) Szilveszter Liszkai
- (Hungary) Ferenc Molnár
- (Hungary) Péter Pallag
- (Hungary) Gábor Pálos
- (Hungary) István Rosta
- (Hungary) Miklós Rosta
- (Hungary) Ákos Sándor
- (Hungary) István Szepesi
- (Hungary) (Serbia) Marko Vasić
- (Bosnia and Herzegovina) Nikola Džono
- (Bosnia and Herzegovina) Faruk Halilbegović
- (Bosnia and Herzegovina) Stanko Stanković
- (Belarus) Stanislav Nakhaenko
- (Belarus) Artsiom Selvasiuk
- (Brazil) Henrique Pedro Martins
- (Brazil) Alencar Cassiano Rossoni
- (Croatia) Rudolf Ćužić
- (Croatia) Jure Kozina
- (Croatia) Matija Pavlović
- (Croatia) Tomislav Radnić
- (Croatia) (Italy) Mate Volarević
- (Croatia) Marko Vukić
- (Iran) Saeid Pourghasemi
- (Japan) Atsushi Mekaru
- (Montenegro) Filip Krivokapić
- (Montenegro) Mirko Vujovic
- (Russia) Aleksey Grigoriev
- (Serbia) Dušan Bozoljac
- (Serbia) Aleksandar Ćirić
- (Serbia) Goran Đukić
- (Serbia) Stefan Ilić
- (Serbia) Igor Milicevic
- (Serbia) Milos Mojsilov
- (Serbia) Petar Papić
- (Serbia) Predrag Rodić
- (Serbia) Darko Trivković
- (Serbia) Nebojsa Vojinovic
- (Slovakia) Lukas Gamrat
- (Slovakia) Marian Kleis
- (Slovakia) Marek Kovácech
- (Slovakia) Michal Melus
- (Slovakia) Tomáš Szűcs

=== Former coaches ===
Seasons	Coach	Country
2013	György Avar	(Hungary)
2014–16	László Skaliczki	(Hungary)
2016	Ferenc Molnár	(Hungary)
2016–17	Pavol Jano	(Slovakia)
2017–18	Péter Drizner	(Hungary)
2018–20	Dániel Buday	(Hungary)
2020–	Péter Drizner	(Hungary)
