= Tatai AC =

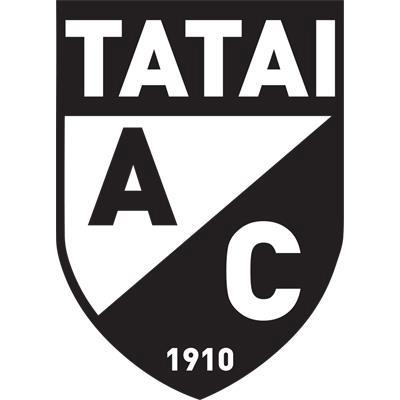
- Full name: Tatai Atlétikai Club
- Short name: TAC
- Founded: 1984
- Arena: Güntner Aréna Városi Sportcsarnok, Tata
- Capacity: 500 seats
- Head coach: Jakab Sibalin
- League: NB I/B
- Club colours
| Home | Away |

Tatai Atlétikai Club is a Hungarian handball club from Tata, that plays in the Nemzeti Bajnokság I/B, the second level championship in Hungary.

Location of Tatai AC

== Crest, colours, supporters ==
=== Naming history ===
| Name | Period |
|---|---|
| Tatai Honvéd Atlétikai Club | −2012 |
| Tatai Atlétikai Club | 2012–present |

=== Kit manufacturers and Shirt sponsor ===
The following table shows in detail Tatai AC kit manufacturers and shirt sponsors by year:

| Period | Kit manufacturer | Shirt sponsor |
|---|---|---|
| | (Germany) | |
| 2013–2015 | (Germany) | TKV-Tatai Környezetvédelmi Zrt. |
| 2015–2016 | (Germany) | TKV-Tatai Környezetvédelmi Zrt. / KNYKK Zrt. |
| 2016–2017 | (Germany) | – |
| 2017–2018 | (Germany) | Güntner-Tata Hűtőtechnika Kft. |
| 2018– | (Germany) | Tata / Güntner-Tata Hűtőtechnika Kft. / Agro Tata Kft. |

=== Kits ===
HOME
| 2011–12 | 2014–15 | 2015–16 | 2017–18 | 2018–19 | 2019–20 | 2020–21 | 2021–22 | 2022–23 |

AWAY
| 2011–12 | 2015–16 | 2017–18 | 2018–19 | 2019–20 | 2021–22 | 2022–23 |

THIRD

2022–23

== Sports Hall information ==
- Name: – Güntner Aréna Városi Sportcsarnok
- City: – Tata
- Capacity: – 500
- Address: – 2890 Tata, Kőkút köz 2.

== Management ==
| Position | Name |
|---|---|
| Head Of Department | (Hungary) Tamás Somogyvári |
| Technical manager | (Hungary) Nándor Radnai |
| Technical manager | (Hungary) Attila Kurcsik |

== Team ==
=== Current squad ===
Squad for the 2023–24 season

Tatai AC

Goalkeepers

- 1 (Hungary) Máté Darmstädter
- 26 (Hungary) Ádám Hajós
- (Hungary) Ákos Hermann

Left Wingers

- 4 (Hungary) Ádám Sárosi
- (Hungary) Attila Kretz

Right Wingers

- 21 (Hungary) Martin Kiss
- (Hungary) Kevin Zatureczki

Line Players

- 19 (Hungary) Kolen Krancz
- 23 (Hungary) Marcell Molnár
- (Hungary) Gergő Czunyi
- (Hungary) Máté Klucsik
- (Hungary) Bence Farkas

Central Backs

- 2 (Hungary) Bálint Katus
- 10 (Hungary) Zsombor Nényei
- (Hungary) Márkó Eklemovic
- (Hungary) Zoltán Körtélyesi

Left Backs

- 6 (Hungary) Ákos Vass
- 18 (Hungary) Barnabás Tass
- (Hungary) András Schekk
- (Hungary) Róbert Huber

Right Backs

- 14 (Hungary) Kristóf Valler
- 24 (Hungary) Márk Kreisz

=== Technical staff ===
- Head coach: (Hungary) Jakab Sibalin
- Assistant Coach: (Hungary) Ádám Márton

=== Transfers ===
Transfers for the 2023–24 season

Joining

- (Hungary) András Schekk (LB) from (Hungary) QHB-Eger
- (Hungary) Ákos Hermann (GK) from (Hungary) BFKA-Balatonfüred
- (Hungary) Kristóf Valler (RB) from (Hungary) BFKA-Balatonfüred
- (Hungary) Attila Kretz (LW) from (Hungary) SC Pick Szeged U21
- (Hungary) Máté Klucsik (LP) on loan from (Hungary) Balatonfüredi KSE
- (Hungary) Kevin Zatureczki (RW) on loan from (Hungary) Dabas KK
- (Hungary) Márkó Eklemovic (CB) on loan from (Hungary) MOL Tatabánya KC
- (Hungary) Kolen Krancz (LP) on loan from (Hungary) MOL Tatabánya KC

Leaving

- (Hungary) Péter Tatai (GK) to (Hungary) KK Ajka
- (Hungary) Ádám Iváncsik (LW) to (Hungary) Komárom VSE
- (Hungary) Dániel Gajdos (LP) to (Hungary) PLER-Budapest
- (Hungary) Tamás Oláh (RB)
- (Hungary) Barnabás Tóth (RW)
- (Hungary) Norbert Blázsovics (GK)
- (Hungary) Ádám Bodnár (CB) loan back to (Hungary) MOL Tatabánya KC
- (Hungary) Áron Kovács (RB) loan back to (Hungary) Budai Farkasok KKUK

== Previous Squads ==
2018–2019 Team
| Shirt No | Nationality | Player | Birth Date | Position |
|---|---|---|---|---|
| 1 | Hungary | Máté Kisék | 4 July 1993 (age 33) | Goalkeeper |
| 2 | Hungary | Márton Mizser | 27 November 1998 (age 27) | Left Winger |
| 4 | Hungary | Ádám Sárosi | 8 October 1998 (age 28) | Left Winger |
| 6 | Hungary | Bence Benis | 22 February 1989 (age 37) | Right Winger |
| 7 | Hungary | Balázs Szi-Benedek | 12 June 2002 (age 24) | Left Back |
| 8 | Hungary | Gergely Bagi | 13 November 1998 (age 27) | Central Back |
| 10 | Hungary | Gergely Harsányi | 3 May 1981 (age 45) | Right Winger |
| 11 | Hungary | Róbert Halász | 17 October 1996 (age 29) | Right Back |
| 15 | Hungary | Dániel Fekete | 14 June 1999 (age 27) | Left Back |
| 16 | Hungary | Szabolcs Sarmon | 14 February 1989 (age 37) | Goalkeeper |
| 17 | Hungary | Márió Győrffi | 23 June 1993 (age 33) | Central Back |
| 19 | Hungary | Miklós Rosta | 14 February 1999 (age 27) | Line Player |
| 20 | Hungary | Balázs Boros | 2 August 1999 (age 27) | Right Back |
| 23 | Hungary | Milán Steczina | 19 July 2000 (age 26) | Left Back |
| 24 | Hungary | András Schekk | 15 August 1997 (age 29) | Left Back |
| 30 | Hungary | Attila Venczel | 1 February 1992 (age 34) | Central Back |
| 33 | Hungary | Xavér Deményi | 16 April 1999 (age 27) | Goalkeeper |
| 41 | Hungary | Csongor Csányi | 2 August 2002 (age 24) | Left Winger |
| 44 | Hungary | Zsolt Schäffer | 13 May 1999 (age 27) | Right Back |
| 54 | Hungary | Péter Báthori | 31 July 1985 (age 41) | Line Player |

2015–2016 Team
| Shirt No | Nationality | Player | Birth Date | Position |
|---|---|---|---|---|
| 3 | Hungary | János Szalczinger | 3 March 1988 (age 38) | Line Player |
| 5 | Hungary | Bence Kanyó | 10 November 1990 (age 35) | Central Back |
| 6 | Hungary | Balázs Kanyó | 13 April 1989 (age 37) | Central Back |
| 7 | Hungary | Ferenc Szám | 25 February 1981 (age 45) | Left Back |
| 8 | Hungary | Dezső Endrédi | 20 August 1992 (age 34) | Right Winger |
| 9 | Hungary | Zoltán Hímer | 13 August 1974 (age 52) | Central Back |
| 10 | Hungary | Szabolcs Szövérdffy | 9 January 1995 (age 31) | Left Back |
| 12 | Hungary | Attila Varga | 7 April 1992 (age 34) | Goalkeeper |
| 13 | Hungary | Péter Endrédi | 20 August 1992 (age 34) | Right Winger |
| 15 | Hungary | Ádám Márton | 6 May 1981 (age 45) | Line Player |
| 16 | Hungary | Tibor Czérna | 15 July 1976 (age 50) | Goalkeeper |
| 17 | Hungary | Szabolcs Basky | 13 November 1990 (age 35) | Left Winger |
| 18 | Hungary | Ádám Kanyó | 18 April 1985 (age 41) | Left Winger |
| 19 | Hungary | Péter Lengyel | 31 August 1980 (age 46) | Left Back |
| 20 | Hungary | Márk Szerencsés | 8 December 1994 (age 31) | Central Back |
| 22 | Hungary | Zoltán Lehőcz | 12 May 1988 (age 38) | Line Player |
| 23 | Hungary | Péter Vaskó | 16 July 1995 (age 31) | Right Winger |
| 28 | Hungary | Martin Kállai | 24 April 1995 (age 31) | Right Back |
| 77 | Hungary | Ádám Juhász | 6 June 1996 (age 30) | Central Back |

2014–2015 Team
| Shirt No | Nationality | Player | Birth Date | Position |
|---|---|---|---|---|
| 2 | Hungary | Róbert Kányai | 26 January 1981 (age 45) | Line Player |
| 3 | Hungary | Dániel Kőhalmi | 30 November 1988 (age 37) | Left Back |
| 5 | Hungary | Bence Kanyó | 10 November 1990 (age 35) | Central Back |
| 6 | Hungary | Balázs Kanyó | 13 April 1989 (age 37) | Central Back |
| 7 | Hungary | Patrik Schneider | 23 February 1992 (age 34) | Right Back |
| 8 | Hungary | Dezső Endrédi | 20 August 1992 (age 34) | Right Winger |
| 10 | Hungary | László Kovácsovics | 4 January 1986 (age 40) | Left Back |
| 12 | Hungary | Attila Varga | 7 April 1992 (age 34) | Goalkeeper |
| 13 | Hungary | Péter Endrédi | 20 August 1992 (age 34) | Right Winger |
| 14 | Hungary | Tamás Hajdú | 24 November 1988 (age 37) | Right Back |
| 15 | Hungary | Ádám Márton | 6 May 1981 (age 45) | Line Player |
| 16 | Hungary | Tibor Czérna | 15 July 1976 (age 50) | Goalkeeper |
| 18 | Hungary | Ádám Kanyó | 18 April 1985 (age 41) | Left Winger |
| 19 | Hungary | Máté Hollós | 28 May 1990 (age 36) | Left Winger |
| 22 | Hungary | Zoltán Lehőcz | 12 May 1988 (age 38) | Line Player |
| 28 | Hungary | Ádám Kiss | 16 October 1988 (age 37) | Central Back |

=== Top Scorers ===
| Season | Player | Apps/Goals |
|---|---|---|
| 2022–2023 | (Hungary) Ákos Vass | 28/119 |

== Honours ==
| Honours | | No. | Years |
League
| Nemzeti Bajnokság I/B | Winners | 2 | 2006–07, 2010–11 |
| Nemzeti Bajnokság I/B | Runners-up | 1 | 2009–10 |
| Nemzeti Bajnokság I/B | Third Place | 3 | 2008–09, 2013–14, 2020–21 |

== Recent seasons ==
- Seasons in Nemzeti Bajnokság I: 17
- Seasons in Nemzeti Bajnokság I/B: 13

| Season | Division | Pos. | Magyar kupa |
|---|---|---|---|
| 2003–04 | NB II Nyugat | 1st | |
| 2004–05 | NB I/B Nyugat | 9th | |
| 2005–06 | NB I/B Nyugat | 11th | |
| 2006–07 | NB I/B Nyugat | 1st | |
| 2007–08 | NB I | 14th | |
| 2008–09 | NB I/B Nyugat | 3rd | |
| 2009–10 | NB I/B Nyugat | 2nd | |

| Season | Division | Pos. | Magyar kupa |
|---|---|---|---|
| 2010–11 | NB I/B Nyugat | 1st | |
| 2011–12 | NB I | 12th | |
| 2012–13 | NB I/B Nyugat | 7th | |
| 2013–14 | NB I/B Nyugat | 3rd | |
| 2014–15 | NB I/B Nyugat | 4th | |
| 2015–16 | NB I/B Nyugat | 9th | Round 2 |
| 2016–17 | NB I/B Nyugat | 8th | Round 1 |
| 2017–18 | NB I/B Nyugat | 10th | Round 1 |
| 2018–19 | NB I/B Nyugat | 6th | Round 1 |
| 2019–20 | NB I/B Nyugat | Cancelled | |
| 2020–21 | NB I/B Nyugat | 3rd | Round 3 |

== Former club members ==
=== Notable former players ===
- (Hungary) Gergely Harsányi
- (Hungary) Tamás Iváncsik
- (Hungary) Ádám Juhász
- (Hungary) István Kiss
- (Hungary) Norbert Kuzma
- (Hungary) Miklós Rosta
