= Atsushi Mekaru =

Japanese handball player (born 1985)

Personal information
- Nationality: Japanese
- Born: 3 April 1985 (age 41) Okinawa, Japan
- Height: 1.84 m (6 ft 1/2 in)

Sport
- Sport: Handball
- Position: Centre back
- Current club: Puente Genil
- Number: 31
National team
Years	Team	Apps	(Gls)
–	Japan	10	(37)

Atsushi Mekaru (銘苅 淳, Mekaru Atsushi; born 3 April 1985) is a Japanese handball player for Puente Genil and the Japanese national team.

He participated at the 2017 World Men's Handball Championship.
