= Attila Horváth (handballer) =

Hungarian handball player (born 1966)

Attila Horváth (born 4 January 1966 in Dunaújváros) is a former Hungarian international handball player. He was member of the national team that finished seventh at the 1992 Summer Olympics, and also represented Hungary on the 1993 World Championship a year later.

== Awards ==
- Hungarian Handballer of the Year: 1991
