= Békési FKC =

Hungarian handball club

Békési FKC (Hungary)
- Full name: Békési Férfi Kézilabda Club
- Short name: BFKC
- Founded: 1993; 32 years ago
- Arena: Városi Sportcsarnok, Békés
- Capacity: 800
- Head coach: József Padla
- League: Nemzeti Bajnokság I/B
- Club colours
Home	Away

Békési Férfi Kézilabda Club is a Hungarian handball club from Békés, that played in the Nemzeti Bajnokság I/B, the second level championship in Hungary.

Location of Békési FKC

== Crest, colours, supporters ==
=== Naming history ===
Name	Period
Békési Color SE	1993–1995
Békési FKC	1995–2005
Erste-Békési FKC	2005–2011
Békési FKC	2011–2015
Békés-Drén KC	2015–2019
Optimum Solar-Békési FKC	2019–present

=== Kits ===
HOME
2020–21	2022–23	2025–26

AWAY
2020–21	2022–23	2025–26

== Management ==
Position	Name
Managing director	(Hungary) Richárd Nagy
Technical leader	(Hungary) Péter Ardeleán

== Team ==
=== Current squad ===
Squad for the 2023–24 season

Békési FKC

Goalkeepers

- 12 (Hungary) István Borbély
- 16 (Hungary) Szabolcs Takács

Left Wingers

- 4 (Hungary) Barnabás Balogh
- 92 (Hungary) János Kepess

Right Wingers

- 2 (Hungary) Zsolt Novák
- 14 (Hungary) Bence Fedor

Line players

- 10 (Hungary) Döme Sütő
- 17 (Hungary) Patrik Árpási
- 25 (Hungary) Márk Dávid

Central Backs

- 7 (Hungary) Szabolcs Kovács
- 15 (Hungary) Áron Varsandán
- 22 (Hungary) László Horváth(c)
- 42 (Hungary) Gábor Laufer

Left Backs

- 11 (Hungary) Gergő Haszilló

Right Backs

- 18 (Hungary) Bendegúz Mezei
- 88 (Hungary) Rajmund Kovács

=== Technical staff ===
- Head coach: (Hungary) József Padla
- Goalkeeping coach: (Hungary) Attila Szikora
- Masseur: (Hungary) Imre Kardos
- Club Doctor: (Hungary) Dr. László Magyar

=== Transfers ===
Transfers for the 2024–25 season

Joining

- (Hungary) Marcell Markóczy (GK) from (Hungary) Ferencvárosi TC U21
- (Hungary) Ádám Szabó (RW) from (Hungary) Győri ETO-UNI FKC
- (Hungary) Marcell Breuer (LP) from (Hungary) Csurgói KK
- (Hungary) Patrik Dobos (CB) from (Hungary) KK Ajka

Leaving

- (Hungary) Bendegúz Mezei (RB) to (Hungary) KK Ajka
- (Hungary) Márk Dávid (LP) to (Hungary) Ceglédi KKSE

Transfers for the 2023–24 season

Joining

- (Hungary) János Kepess (LW) from (Hungary) QHB-Eger

Leaving

- (Hungary) Patrik Rusznák (LP) to (Hungary) Debreceni EAC

Transfers for the 2021–22 season

Joining

- (Hungary) Ákos Lele (LB) from (Hungary) Orosházi FKSE
- (Hungary) Miksa Hrabák (LW) from (Hungary) Budakalász FKC
- (Hungary) Olivér Kiss (GK) from (Hungary) Kecskeméti TE
- (Hungary) Gábor Laufer (CB) from (Hungary) KK Ajka
- (Hungary) Márk Dávid (LP) from (Hungary) NEKA

Leaving

- (Hungary) László Pajkó (GK) to (Hungary) Orosházi FKSE
- (Hungary) András Gál (CB) to (Hungary) Ózdi KC

== Honours ==
Honours		No.	Years
League
Nemzeti Bajnokság I/B	Winners	2	2001–02, 2004–05
Nemzeti Bajnokság I/B	Runners-up	2	1997–98, 2017–18
Nemzeti Bajnokság I/B	Third Place	3	1995–96, 1998–99, 2016–17

== Recent seasons ==
As of 1 December 2021.

- Seasons in Nemzeti Bajnokság I: 5
- Seasons in Nemzeti Bajnokság I/B: 23
- Seasons in Nemzeti Bajnokság II 1

Season	Division	Pos.	Magyar kupa
1993–94	NB II Délkelet	1st	
1994–95	NB I/B Kelet	4th	
1995–96	NB I/B Kelet	3rd	
1996–97	NB I/B Kelet	5th	
1997–98	NB I/B Kelet	2nd	
1998–99	NB I/B Kelet	3rd	
1999-00	NB I/B Kelet	4th	
2000–01	NB I/B Kelet	7th	
2001–02	NB I/B Kelet	1st	
2002–03	NB I	11th	

Season	Division	Pos.	Magyar kupa
2003–04	NB I	11th	
2004–05	NB I/B Kelet	1st	
2005–06	NB I	10th	
2006–07	NB I	6th	
2007–08	NB I	5th	
2008–09	NB I/B Kelet	6th	
2009–10	NB I/B Kelet	4th	
2010–11	NB I/B Kelet	4th	Round 2
2011–12	NB I/B Kelet	6th	Round 1
2012–13	NB I/B Kelet	6th	Round 3

Season	Division	Pos.	Magyar kupa
2013–14	NB I/B Kelet	7th	Round 4
2014–15	NB I/B Kelet	5th	Round 2
2015–16	NB I/B Kelet	6th	Round 3
2016–17	NB I/B Kelet	3rd	Round 2
2017–18	NB I/B Kelet	2nd	Round 2
2018–19	NB I/B Kelet	5th	Round 1
2019–20	NB I/B Kelet	Cancelled	
2020–21	NB I/B Kelet	7th	Round 2
2021–22	NB I/B Kelet		

== Former club members ==
=== Notable former players ===
- (Hungary) Gábor Ancsin (2004–2005)
- (Hungary) József Czina (2005–2007, 2020–)
- (Hungary) Mátyás Győri (2007–2013)
- (Hungary) Ákos Lele (2021–)
- (Hungary) Kornél Nagy (2002–2005)
- (Hungary) Gábor Oláh (2005–2008, 2016–2020)
- (Hungary) (Romania) Levente Szabó (2005–2006)
- (Hungary) Péter Tóth (2011–2015)
- (Hungary) (Austria) Norbert Visy (2004)
- (Romania) Marius Novanc (2002–2004)
- (Serbia) Borislav Basaric (2005–2006)
- (Serbia) Igor Milicevic (2005–2006)
- (Serbia) Vladimir Zelic (2005–2006)

=== Former coaches ===
Seasons	Coach	Country
2021–	József Padla	(Hungary)
