= Főnix Aréna =

Multi-purpose arena in Debrecen, Hungary

Phoenix Arena
- Főnix Aréna
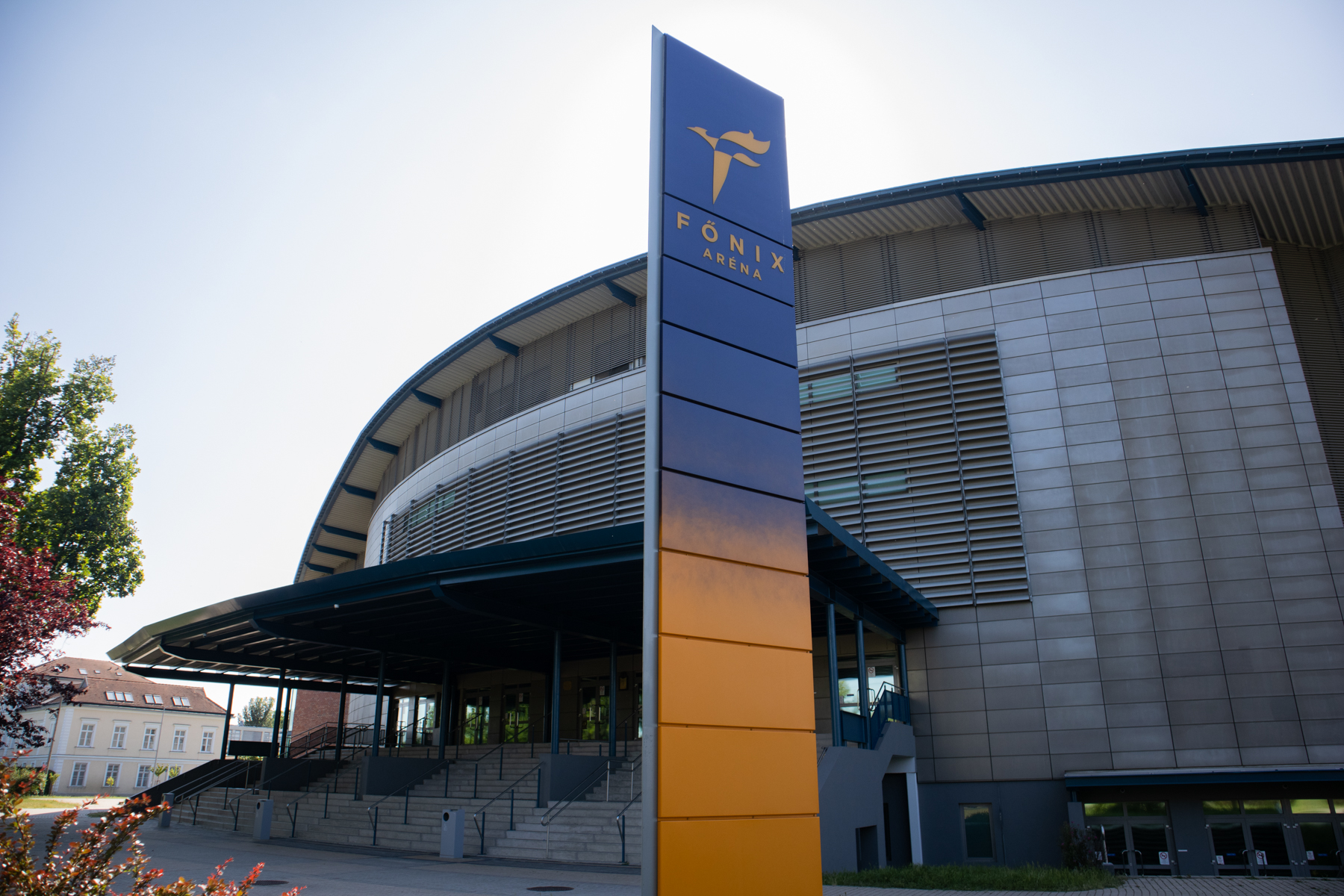
- Interactive map of Phoenix Arena
- Former names: Főnix Hall (2002–2021)
- Address: 4028 Debrecen, Kassai út 28.
- Location: Debrecen, Hungary
- Coordinates: 47.5457°N 21.6427°E
- Operator: Főnix Rendezvényszervező Kht.
- Capacity: 8,500 (concert); 6,500 (handball)

Construction
- Built: 18 February 2002
- Opened: 30 September 2002
- Renovated: 2021
- Architect: Miklós Heppes

Website
- www.fonixarena.hu/en

Főnix Arena,until 2021 Főnix Hall, Főnix Csarnok is a multi-purpose arena in Debrecen, Hungary. The arena holds 8,500 people and opened in 2002. It hosted the 2002 World Artistic Gymnastics Championships. The arena was named after the Phoenix, a mythical firebird which is the symbol of Debrecen. Főnix Aréna is the third largest arena in Hungary, and the largest outside Budapest.

== Background ==
Főnix Hall is located in Debrecen, which is the second largest city of Hungary, in a pleasant environment: close to the Nagyerdő area, near Road 4, along the thoroughfare to Košice called Kassai út. Entering the building through the main entrance, one immediately find itself in the arena space. Along one of the longitudinal sides of the amphitheater, there are locker rooms and service facilities for the athletes, while the other side is actually a multifunctional area that can be freely divided with the help of relocatable partition walls. In the city, the demand had long been in the air for a state-of-the-art convention hall/arena with a larger than average seating capacity. The final impulse was provided by the possibility of acting as the host for the 2002 World Championship in Gymnastics. In fact, the plans for an already existing sports hall from the city of Tallinn (Estonia) were adapted to suit the local circumstances. The construction of Főnix Hall was completed in eight months.

== Events ==
Since its inauguration, the hall has acted as the venue for a variety of events (such as ice hockey, indoor soccer, basketball and handball tournaments, hot air balloon and ballroom dancing championships, ballet performances, music concerts, various exhibitions, conferences and even ice shows). The long list of celebrities having performed here ranges from Olympic champion Szilveszter Csollány and the heavy metal band Iron Maiden or the rock band Deep Purple through the pianist Richard Clayderman to conductor Kobayashi Ken-Ichiro and singer Bryan Adams, including a number of other famous athletes and artists.

Főnix Hall and Papp László Sportaréna are the two stadiums hosting the 2010 UEFA Futsal Championship in Hungary with the final being played at the Főnix Hall.

The arena will host the 2024 European Women's Handball Championship and the 2027 World Women's Handball Championship.

== Facilities ==
The arena proper is fully surrounded with telescope-joint stands (and diagonally turned-in mobile bleachers in the corners). During concerts, the stage actually replaces the stand at the far end of the hall and the entire arena floor is available for the audience to occupy. The props and technical equipment required for the performances can be moved into the arena section through two larger size freight entrances that are 2.5 and 4 meters wide respectively. The gym storeroom next to the gates is accessible from several sides due to the huge sliding doors, and a configuration of several separately lockable storerooms can be arranged if necessary, including rooms for track and field, gymnastics, martial arts, or ice-skating. Even the largest sized apparatuses can be freely moved about. Behind the mobile bleachers, there is a series of other service venues: locker rooms for the athletes, doctors' rooms, changing rooms for the hall personnel, storage rooms, the electric substation room, the gym storeroom, and the fitness room.

Főnix hall is connected to the adjacent Imre Hódos Sports Hall through an underground passageway, so that the facilities could also be used during certain larger events for training or changing purposes or for offices, if necessary. The elevator serves this basement level, too, so the facilities are thus accessible even for mobility impaired athletes.

== Technical information ==
- external width: 76.63 m
- external length: 108.56 m
- external height: 21.1 m
- ceiling height of the arena floor: 14.4 m
- clearance under the projector: 11.4 m
- length of the arena floor: 70 m
- width of the arena floor: 43.8 m
- arena floor total area: 3066 m2
- number of floors: 4
- staircase-towers: 4
- elevators: 4+1
- seating capacity without the arena floor: 6480
- seating capacity with a stage arrangement: 7039
- seating capacity of the arena floor: 1280
- maximum number of spectators in the hall: 8500
- locker rooms for athletes: 6
- snack buffets: 7
- restaurants: 2
- seating capacity of the multifunctional room: 300
- parking spaces for cars: 455
- parking spaces for buses: 28

== See also ==
- List of indoor arenas in Hungary

Preceded by Gondomar; Porto	UEFA Futsal Championship; Final Venue; 2010	Succeeded by Arena Zagreb; Zagreb
Preceded by Sleuyter Arena; Ostend	EuroChallenge; Final Four Venue; 2012	Succeeded by TBD
Preceded by Shanghai Oriental Sports Center; Shanghai	World Short Track Speed Skating Championships; Venue; 2013	Succeeded by Maurice Richard Arena; Montreal
