= KK Ajka =

Hungarian handball club

KK Ajka SE (Hungary)
- Full name: Kézilabda Klub Ajka Sportegyesület
- Short name: KK Ajka
- Founded: 1997; 28 years ago
- Arena: Városi Szabadidő- és Sportcentrum, Ajka
- Head coach: Péter Velky
- League: NB I/B
- Club colours
Home	Away

Kézilabda Klub Ajka is a Hungarian handball club from Ajka, that plays in the Nemzeti Bajnokság I/B, the second level championship in Hungary.

Location of KK Ajka

== History ==
Ajka men's handball was created in 1960 under the name Ajka SE. In 1997, the team was re-established with its current name KK Ajka SE.

== Crest, colours, supporters ==
=== Kits ===
HOME

2017–18

== Management ==
Position	Name
Executive Chairman	(Hungary) Gyula Geri
Club Director	(Hungary) István Székely
Technical Manager	(Hungary) Roland Galler

== Team ==
=== Current squad ===
Squad for the 2022–23 season

KK Ajka

Goalkeepers

- 12 (Hungary) Tamás Konyicsák
- 33 (Hungary) Bertalan Oláh
- 85 (Hungary) Sándor Baracskay

Left Wingers

- 2 (Hungary) Tibor Bonyhádi
- 95 (Hungary) Bence Ernei

Right Wingers

- 17 (Hungary) Norbert Gyene
- 39 (Hungary) Kevin Forgács

Line Players

- 20 (Hungary) Attila Buri
- 21 (Hungary) Marcell Breuer

Central Backs

- 7 (Hungary) Patrik Dobos
- 14 (Hungary) Patrik Tóth

Left Backs

- 8 (Hungary) Sebestyén Jávor
- 15 (Hungary) Sándor Kiss
- 18 (Hungary) Martin Olivér Nagy
- 24 (Hungary) András John (c)

Right Backs

- 42 (Hungary) Kristóf Perczel

=== Technical staff ===
- Head Coach: (Hungary) Péter Velky
- Assistant coach: (Hungary) Csaba Tömör
- Goalkeeping Coach: (Hungary) Szabolcs Varga
- Physiotherapist: (Hungary) Dániel Halász
- Masseur: (Hungary) Zsolt Markó

=== Transfers ===
Transfers for the 2024–25 season

Joining

- (Hungary) Barnabás Orbán (LW) from (Hungary) Carbonex-Komló
- (Hungary) Bendegúz Mezei (RB) from (Hungary) Békési FKC
- (Hungary) (Romania) Tas Szabó (RB) from (Hungary) BFKA-Veszprém
- (Hungary) Milán Benkő (GK) on loan from (Hungary) Csurgói KK

Leaving

- (Hungary) Péter Tatai (GK) (retires)
- (Hungary) Bence Ernei (LW) (retires)
- (Hungary) Patrik Dobos (CB) to (Hungary) Békési FKC
- (Hungary) Kristóf Perczel (RB)
- (Hungary) Kevin Forgács (RW)
- (Hungary) Patrik Tóth (CB)
- (Hungary) Marcell Breuer (LP) loan back to (Hungary) Csurgói KK

Transfers for the 2023–24 season

Joining

- (Hungary) Péter Tatai (GK) from (Hungary) Tatai AC
- (Hungary) Ádám Bodnár (CB) from (Hungary) Kecskeméti TE
- (Hungary) Bálint Rosta (LP) on loan from (Hungary) Győri ETO-UNI FKC

Leaving

Transfers for the 2022–23 season

Joining

- (Hungary) Norbert Gyene (RW) from (Hungary) Ceglédi KKSE
- (Hungary) Patrik Tóth (CB) from (Hungary) Ceglédi KKSE
- (Hungary) Bence Ernei (LW) from (Hungary) Pécsi VSE
- (Hungary) Martin Olivér Nagy (LB) from (Hungary) BFKA-Balatonfüred
- (Hungary) Attila Buri (LP) from (Hungary) NEKA
- (Hungary) Sebestyén Jávor (LB) from (Hungary) Budakalászi SC
- (Hungary) Marcell Breuer (LP) on loan from (Hungary) Csurgói KK
- (Hungary) Tamás Konyicsák (GK) on loan from (Hungary) Csurgói KK

Leaving

== Recent seasons ==
- Seasons in Nemzeti Bajnokság I/B: 9
- Seasons in Nemzeti Bajnokság II: 14

Season	Division	Pos.	Magyar kupa
2000-01	NB II Északnyugat	4th	
2001-02	NB II Északnyugat	9th	
2002-03	NB II Északnyugat	6th	
2003-04	NB II Északnyugat	3rd	
2004-05	NB II Északnyugat	2nd	
2005-06	NB II Északnyugat	4th	
2006-07	NB II Északnyugat	4th	
2007-08	NB II Északnyugat	1st	
2008-09	NB I/B Nyugat	5th	
2009-10	NB I/B Nyugat	12nd	
2010-11	NB I/B Nyugat	10th	
2011-12	NB I/B Nyugat	11th	
2012-13	NB I/B Nyugat	12th	

Season	Division	Pos.	Magyar kupa
2013-14	NB I/B Nyugat	13th	
2014-15	NB II Északnyugat	2nd	
2015-16	NB II Északnyugat	1st	
2016-17	NB II Északnyugat	1st	
2017-18	NB I/B Nyugat	12th	
2018-19	NB II Északnyugat	2nd	
2019-20	NB II Északnyugat	Cancelled	
2020-21	NB I/B Nyugat	10th	
2021-22	NB II Északnyugat	1st	
2022-23	NB I/B		

== Former club members ==
=== Notable former players ===
- (Hungary) Zsolt Cziráki (2010–2011)
- (Hungary) László Béres (2006–2007)
- (Hungary) Péter Tatai (2023–2024)
- (Hungary) Bence Zdolik (2011–2012)
