= Törökszentmiklósi KE =

Hungarian handball club

ARAGO Törökszentmiklósi KE
- Full name: Törökszentmiklósi Kézilabda Egyesület
- Short name: TKE
- Founded: 2001
- Arena: Városi Sportcsarnok, Törökszentmiklós
- Capacity: 700 seats
- Head coach: Gergely Kis
- League: NB I/B
- Club colours
| Home | Away |

Törökszentmiklósi Kézilabda Egyesület is a Hungarian handball club from Törökszentmiklós, that plays in the Nemzeti Bajnokság I/B.

Location of Törökszentmiklósi KE

== Naming history ==
- 2001–2009: Törökszentmiklósi KE
- 2009–2014: Claas-Törökszentmiklósi KE
- 2014–present: Arago Törökszentmiklósi KE

=== Kits ===
HOME
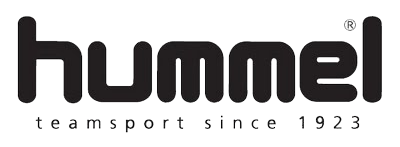
2017-18

AWAY
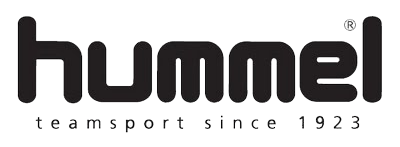
2017-18

== Team ==
=== Current squad ===
Squad for the 2015–16 season

Goalkeepers

Wingers

Pivots

Back players

=== Staff members ===
- Head Coach: Gergely Kis (HUN)
- Assistant Coach:
- Club Doctor:, MD
- Masseur:

== Previous Squads ==
2015–2016 Team
| Shirt No | Nationality | Player | Birth Date | Position |
|---|---|---|---|---|
| 2 | Montenegro | Igor Krivokapić | 14 April 1993 (age 33) | Central Back |
| 3 | Hungary | Dániel Gál | 3 July 1988 (age 38) | Line Player |
| 4 | Hungary | Péter Hajdú | 4 June 1995 (age 31) | Left Back |
| 7 | Hungary | Imre Kovács | 10 May 1985 (age 41) | Left Winger |
| 8 | Hungary | Kristóf Farkas | 13 August 1990 (age 36) | Right Back |
| 9 | Hungary | Péter Forgács | 2 May 1989 (age 37) | Left Back |
| 12 | Hungary | Mihály Fehér | 3 June 1994 (age 32) | Goalkeeper |
| 14 | Hungary | Zoltán Dengi | 7 July 1975 (age 51) | Line Player |
| 16 | Montenegro | Goran Andjelic | 12 March 1988 (age 38) | Goalkeeper |
| 17 | Hungary | Zoltán Debiec | 7 September 1998 (age 28) | Right Back |
| 17 | Montenegro | Filip Markovic | 14 March 1998 (age 28) | Left Back |
