= 2019–20 Veszprém KC season =

Veszprém KC
2019–20 season
- Chairman: János Szabó
- Manager: (Spain) David Davis
| Home colours | Away colours |

The 2019–20 season will be Veszprém KC's 39th competitive and consecutive season in the Nemzeti Bajnokság I and 42nd year in existence as a handball club.

== Players ==
=== Squad information ===
Goalkeepers

- 1 (Spain) Arpad Sterbik
- 12 (Hungary) Márton Székely
- 16 (Serbia) Vladimir Cupara

Left Wingers

- 2 (North Macedonia) Dejan Manaskov
- 26 (Croatia) Manuel Štrlek

Right Wingers

- 17 (Slovenia) Dragan Gajić
- 24 (Slovenia) Gašper Marguč

Line players

- 13 (Brazil) Rogério Moraes Ferreira
- 18 (Sweden) Andreas Nilsson
- 31 (Slovenia) Blaž Blagotinšek

Left Backs

- 25 (Denmark) Rasmus Lauge Schmidt
- 30 (Bosnia and Herzegovina) Mirsad Terzić
- 51 (Slovenia) Borut Mačkovšek
- 87 (Montenegro) Vuko Borozan

Central Backs

- 34 (Serbia) Petar Nenadić
- 35 (France) Kentin Mahé
- 66 (Hungary) Máté Lékai (c)

Right Backs

- 5 (Egypt) Yahia Omar
- 15 (Norway) Kent Robin Tønnesen
- 22 (Poland) Paweł Paczkowski

=== Transfers ===
Source: hetmeteres.hu

In:

- (France) William Accambray (loan from (Slovenia) Celje)
- Gábor Ancsin (loan from Ferencváros)
- (Serbia) Vladimir Cupara (from (Poland) Kielce)
- (Brazil) Rogério Moraes Ferreira (from (North Macedonia) Vardar)
- Patrik Ligetvári (loan from (Spain) Ademar León)
- (Egypt) Yahia Omar (from (Egypt) Zamalek)
- (Poland) Paweł Paczkowski (loan from (Poland) Kielce)
- (Denmark) Rasmus Lauge Schmidt (from (Germany) Flensburg)
- Márton Székely (from Tatabánya)

Out:

- (France) William Accambray (loan to (Belarus) Meskov Brest)
- Gábor Ancsin (loan to Tatabánya)
- (Serbia) Momir Ilić (retired)
- Iman Jamali (to (Romania) Dinamo București)
- Patrik Ligetvári (loan to (Spain) Logroño)
- Roland Mikler (to Szeged)
- László Nagy (retired)
- (Denmark) René Toft Hansen (to (Portugal) Benfica)

== Club ==
=== Technical Staff ===
| Position | Staff member |
|---|---|
| President | (Hungary) János Szabó |
| CEO | (Hungary) Dr. Zoltán Csík |
| Head coach | (Spain) David Davis |
| Assistant coaches | (Cuba) (Hungary) Carlos Pérez |
| Goalkeeping coach | (Bosnia and Herzegovina) (Hungary) Haris Porobić |
| Team doctor | (Hungary) Dr. Zsolt Mahunka |
| Team doctor | (Hungary) Dr. Tibor Sydó |
| Masseur | (Hungary) József Végh |
| Masseur | (Hungary) Antal Szücs |
| Physiotherapist | (Serbia) Nemanja Vučić |
| Conditioning coach | (Serbia) Marija Lojanica |

Source: Coaches, Staff

=== Uniform ===
- Supplier: hummel
- Main sponsor: Telekom / tippmix / Euroaszfalt / Jysk / City of Veszprém
- Back sponsor: Duna Aszfalt / Euronics
- Shorts sponsor: MKB Bank / SEAT

== Competitions ==
=== Overview ===
Win Draw Loss

| Competition | First match | Last match | Starting round | Final position | Record | | | | | | | |
| Competition | First match | Last match | Starting round | Final position | Pld | W | D | L | GF | GA | GD | Win % |
|---|---|---|---|---|---|---|---|---|---|---|---|---|
| Nemzeti Bajnokság I | 23 August 2019 | 10 March 2020 | Matchday 8 | no title awarded | 19 | 19 | 0 | 0 | 686 | 477 | +209 | 100.00 |
| Magyar Kupa | 3 February 2020 | 3 February | Fifth round | no title awarded | 1 | 1 | 0 | 0 | 26 | 16 | +10 | 100.00 |
| EHF Champions League | 14 September 2019 | - | Group stage | - | 10 | 7 | 0 | 3 | 333 | 288 | +45 | 70.00 |
| SEHA League | 3 September 2019 | 4 April 2020 | Group phase | - | 10 | 8 | 0 | 2 | 306 | 265 | +41 | 80.00 |
| Total | | | | | 40 | 35 | 0 | 5 | 1,351 | 1,046 | +305 | 87.50 |

Last updated: 21 May 2020
Source: Competitions

=== Nemzeti Bajnokság I ===
| Pos | Team | Pld | W | D | L | GF | GA | GD | Pts | Qualification or relegation |
|---|---|---|---|---|---|---|---|---|---|---|
| 1 | MOL-Pick Szeged | 20 | 19 | 0 | 1 | 733 | 485 | +248 | 38 | |
| 2 | Telekom Veszprém | 18 | 18 | 0 | 0 | 653 | 451 | +202 | 36 | |
| 3 | HE-DO B. Braun Gyöngyös | 17 | 11 | 1 | 5 | 512 | 468 | +44 | 23 | |
| 4 | FTC-HungaroControl | 18 | 11 | 1 | 6 | 518 | 484 | +34 | 23 | |
| 5 | Grundfos Tatabánya KC | 17 | 11 | 0 | 6 | 485 | 446 | +39 | 22 | |
| 6 | Balatonfüredi KSE | 18 | 10 | 1 | 7 | 525 | 496 | +29 | 21 | |
| 7 | Csurgói KK | 18 | 9 | 1 | 8 | 450 | 457 | −7 | 19 | |
| 8 | Sport36-Komló | 18 | 8 | 2 | 8 | 470 | 478 | −8 | 18 | |
| 9 | Dabasi KC VSE | 18 | 6 | 1 | 11 | 459 | 527 | −68 | 13 | |
| 10 | SBS-Eger | 17 | 5 | 2 | 10 | 457 | 522 | −65 | 12 | |
| 11 | Orosházi FKSE - Linamar | 18 | 4 | 2 | 12 | 451 | 520 | −69 | 10 | |
| 12 | Mezőkövesdi KC | 18 | 2 | 5 | 11 | 451 | 552 | −101 | 9 | Relegation to Nemzeti Bajnokság I/B |
| 13 | Budakalász Kézilabda ZRT | 19 | 2 | 1 | 16 | 468 | 565 | −97 | 5 | |
| 14 | VKSE KFT Vác | 18 | 1 | 1 | 16 | 417 | 598 | −181 | 3 | Relegation to Nemzeti Bajnokság I/B |

Updated to match(es) played on October 2020. Source: mksz.hu
Rules for classification: 1) Points; 2) Goal difference; 3) Head-to-head points; 4) Head-to-head goal difference; 5) Goals scored; 6) Matches won; 7) Draw (Note: Head-to-head record is used only after all the matches between the teams in question have been played)

==== Results by round ====
| Match | 1 | 2 | 3 | 4 | 5 | 6 | 7 | 8 | 9 | 10 | 11 | 12 | 13 | 14 | 15 | 16 | 17 | 18 | 19 | 20 | 21 | 22 | 23 | 24 | 25 | 26 |
|---|---|---|---|---|---|---|---|---|---|---|---|---|---|---|---|---|---|---|---|---|---|---|---|---|---|---|
| Ground | H | H | H | H | H | A | A | H | H | A | A | H | H | A | H | A | H | A | A | A | A | A | A | H | A | H |
| Result | W | W | W | W | W | W | W | W | W | W | W | W | W | W | W | W | W | W | W | C | C | C | C | C | C | C |

Updated to match(es) played on 5 February 2020. Source: Matches
A = Away; H = Home; W = Win; D = Draw; L = Loss; C = Cancelled

The matches follow a chronological order.

==== Matches ====
| Round 1; 31 August 2019; 18:00 | Telekom Veszprém | 40–26 | Váci KSE | Veszprém Aréna, Veszprém; Attendance: 1,237; Referees: Réti, Szedmák |
| Round 1; 31 August 2019; 18:00 | Štrlek 9 | (21–12) | Törteli, Davidović 5 | Veszprém Aréna, Veszprém; Attendance: 1,237; Referees: Réti, Szedmák |
| Round 1; 31 August 2019; 18:00 | 2× (yellow card) 1× (suspension) | Report | 2× (yellow card) 5× (suspension) 1× (red card) | Veszprém Aréna, Veszprém; Attendance: 1,237; Referees: Réti, Szedmák |

| Round 2; 10 September 2019; 18:00 | Telekom Veszprém | 33–22 | Grundfos Tatabánya KC | Veszprém Aréna, Veszprém; Attendance: 2,876; Referees: Andorka, Hucker |
| Round 2; 10 September 2019; 18:00 | Mahé 7 | (15–10) | Győri 5 | Veszprém Aréna, Veszprém; Attendance: 2,876; Referees: Andorka, Hucker |
| Round 2; 10 September 2019; 18:00 | 1× (yellow card) 3× (suspension) | Report | 3× (yellow card) 5× (suspension) | Veszprém Aréna, Veszprém; Attendance: 2,876; Referees: Andorka, Hucker |

| Round 3; 9 December 2019; 18:00 | Telekom Veszprém | 37–26 | Mezőkövesdi KC | Veszprém Aréna, Veszprém; Attendance: 1,071; Referees: Fekete, Tóth |
| Round 3; 9 December 2019; 18:00 | Marguč 11 | (21–17) | Stanković 7 | Veszprém Aréna, Veszprém; Attendance: 1,071; Referees: Fekete, Tóth |
| Round 3; 9 December 2019; 18:00 | 3× (yellow card) 2× (suspension) | Report | 1× (yellow card) 1× (suspension) | Veszprém Aréna, Veszprém; Attendance: 1,071; Referees: Fekete, Tóth |

| Round 4; 17 September 2019; 18:00 | Orosházi FKSE- LINAMAR | 25–31 | Telekom Veszprém | Municipal Sports Hall, Orosháza; Attendance: 347; Referees: Rontó, Szanyi |
| Round 4; 17 September 2019; 18:00 | Mršulja 9 | (10–19) | Štrlek 6 | Municipal Sports Hall, Orosháza; Attendance: 347; Referees: Rontó, Szanyi |
| Round 4; 17 September 2019; 18:00 | 2× (yellow card) 4× (suspension) | Report | 2× (yellow card) 1× (suspension) | Municipal Sports Hall, Orosháza; Attendance: 347; Referees: Rontó, Szanyi |

| Round 5; 25 August 2019; 18:00 | Telekom Veszprém | 40–28 | Balatonfüredi KSE | Veszprém Aréna, Veszprém; Attendance: 2,859; Referees: Horváth, Marton |
| Round 5; 25 August 2019; 18:00 | Borozan 7 | (23–16) | Topić, Máthé 5 | Veszprém Aréna, Veszprém; Attendance: 2,859; Referees: Horváth, Marton |
| Round 5; 25 August 2019; 18:00 | 2× (yellow card) 5× (suspension) | Report | 1× (yellow card) 5× (suspension) | Veszprém Aréna, Veszprém; Attendance: 2,859; Referees: Horváth, Marton |

| Round 6; 8 October 2019; 18:00 | Budakalász FKC | 24–41 | Telekom Veszprém | Municipal Sports Hall, Budakalász; Attendance: 400; Referees: Bujdosó, Horváth |
| Round 6; 8 October 2019; 18:00 | Tóth 6 | (10–21) | Marguč 11 | Municipal Sports Hall, Budakalász; Attendance: 400; Referees: Bujdosó, Horváth |
| Round 6; 8 October 2019; 18:00 | 2× (yellow card) 6× (suspension) 1× (red card) | Report | 2× (yellow card) 5× (suspension) | Municipal Sports Hall, Budakalász; Attendance: 400; Referees: Bujdosó, Horváth |

| Round 7; 15 October 2019; 18:00 | Telekom Veszprém | 34–27 | HE-DO B. Braun Gyöngyös | Veszprém Aréna, Veszprém; Attendance: 1,725; Referees: Altmár, Horváth |
| Round 7; 15 October 2019; 18:00 | Manaskov 11 | (19–15) | Németh 5 | Veszprém Aréna, Veszprém; Attendance: 1,725; Referees: Altmár, Horváth |
| Round 7; 15 October 2019; 18:00 | 2× (yellow card) 2× (suspension) | Report | 2× (yellow card) 2× (suspension) | Veszprém Aréna, Veszprém; Attendance: 1,725; Referees: Altmár, Horváth |

| Round 8; 23 August 2019; 18:00 | Telekom Veszprém | 36–17 | Dabas VSE KC | Veszprém Aréna, Veszprém; Attendance: 1,725; Referees: Altmár, Horváth |
| Round 8; 23 August 2019; 18:00 | Marguč, Štrlek 6 | (19–9) | Zakics 5 | Veszprém Aréna, Veszprém; Attendance: 1,725; Referees: Altmár, Horváth |
| Round 8; 23 August 2019; 18:00 | 1× (yellow card) 2× (suspension) | Report | 3× (yellow card) 2× (suspension) | Veszprém Aréna, Veszprém; Attendance: 1,725; Referees: Altmár, Horváth |

| Round 9; 27 August 2019; 18:00 | Telekom Veszprém | 51–30 | SBS-Eger | Veszprém Aréna, Veszprém; Attendance: 1,600; Referees: Paska, Vastag |
| Round 9; 27 August 2019; 18:00 | Blagotinšek 10 | (28–17) | three players 5 | Veszprém Aréna, Veszprém; Attendance: 1,600; Referees: Paska, Vastag |
| Round 9; 27 August 2019; 18:00 | 2× (yellow card) | Report | 2× (yellow card) 1× (suspension) | Veszprém Aréna, Veszprém; Attendance: 1,600; Referees: Paska, Vastag |

| Round 10; 5 November 2019; 18:00 | Telekom Veszprém | 36–20 | Csurgói KK | Veszprém Aréna, Veszprém; Attendance: 2,345; Referees: Réti, Szedmák |
| Round 10; 5 November 2019; 18:00 | Štrlek 9 | (19–8) | Astrashapkin 5 | Veszprém Aréna, Veszprém; Attendance: 2,345; Referees: Réti, Szedmák |
| Round 10; 5 November 2019; 18:00 | 2× (suspension) | Report | 2× (yellow card) 4× (suspension) | Veszprém Aréna, Veszprém; Attendance: 2,345; Referees: Réti, Szedmák |

| Round 11; 8 October 2019; 18:00 | FTC-HungaroControl | 30–35 | Telekom Veszprém | Elek Gyula Aréna, Budapest; Attendance: 1,200; Referees: Altmár, Horváth |
| Round 11; 8 October 2019; 18:00 | Nagy 8 | (18–17) | Gajić 8 | Elek Gyula Aréna, Budapest; Attendance: 1,200; Referees: Altmár, Horváth |
| Round 11; 8 October 2019; 18:00 | 1× (yellow card) 5× (suspension) | Report | 1× (yellow card) 3× (suspension) | Elek Gyula Aréna, Budapest; Attendance: 1,200; Referees: Altmár, Horváth |

| Round 12; 7 December 2019; 19:30 | Telekom Veszprém | 29–28 | MOL-Pick Szeged | Veszprém Aréna, Veszprém; Attendance: 5,156; Referees: Hargitai, Markó |
| Round 12; 7 December 2019; 19:30 | Štrlek, Nenadić 7 | (15–15) | Cañellas, Radivojević 6 | Veszprém Aréna, Veszprém; Attendance: 5,156; Referees: Hargitai, Markó |
| Round 12; 7 December 2019; 19:30 | 1× (yellow card) 2× (suspension) | Report | 2× (yellow card) 6× (suspension) | Veszprém Aréna, Veszprém; Attendance: 5,156; Referees: Hargitai, Markó |

| Round 13; 11 November 2019; 18:00 | Sport36-Komló | 21–24 | Telekom Veszprém | Municipal Sports Center, Komló; Attendance: 900; Referees: Paska, Vastag |
| Round 13; 11 November 2019; 18:00 | Takács 5 | (10–12) | Marguč 5 | Municipal Sports Center, Komló; Attendance: 900; Referees: Paska, Vastag |
| Round 13; 11 November 2019; 18:00 | 2× (yellow card) 3× (suspension) | Report | 1× (yellow card) 3× (suspension) | Municipal Sports Center, Komló; Attendance: 900; Referees: Paska, Vastag |

| Round 14; 31 January 2020; 18:30 | Váci KSE | 26–39 | Telekom Veszprém | Municipal Sports Hall, Vác; Attendance: 500; Referees: Paska, Vastag |
| Round 14; 31 January 2020; 18:30 | Matsuura 6 | (7–18) | Nilsson, Borozan 6 | Municipal Sports Hall, Vác; Attendance: 500; Referees: Paska, Vastag |
| Round 14; 31 January 2020; 18:30 | 1× (yellow card) 1× (suspension) | Report | 3× (yellow card) 3× (suspension) | Municipal Sports Hall, Vác; Attendance: 500; Referees: Paska, Vastag |

| Round 15; 10 March 2020; 18:00 | Grundfos Tatabánya KC | 26–33 | Telekom Veszprém | Imre Földi Sports Hall, Tatabánya; Attendance: 1,200; Referees: Hargitai, Markó |
| Round 15; 10 March 2020; 18:00 | Győri 5 | (13–18) | Štrlek 8 | Imre Földi Sports Hall, Tatabánya; Attendance: 1,200; Referees: Hargitai, Markó |
| Round 15; 10 March 2020; 18:00 | 2× (yellow card) 2× (suspension) | Report | 3× (yellow card) 2× (suspension) | Imre Földi Sports Hall, Tatabánya; Attendance: 1,200; Referees: Hargitai, Markó |

| Round 16; 18 February 2020; 18:00 | Mezőkövesdi KC | 26–46 | Telekom Veszprém | Municipal Sports Hall, Mezőkövesd; Attendance: 800; Referees: Bíró, Kiss |
| Round 16; 18 February 2020; 18:00 | Menyhárt 5 | (14–22) | Marguč 11 | Municipal Sports Hall, Mezőkövesd; Attendance: 800; Referees: Bíró, Kiss |
| Round 16; 18 February 2020; 18:00 | 2× (suspension) | Report | 1× (suspension) | Municipal Sports Hall, Mezőkövesd; Attendance: 800; Referees: Bíró, Kiss |

| Round 17; 15 February 2020; 18:00 | Telekom Veszprém | 33–22 | Orosházi FKSE- LINAMAR | Veszprém Aréna, Veszprém; Attendance: 1,900; Referees: Sándor, Szikszay |
| Round 17; 15 February 2020; 18:00 | Gajić 7 | (17–6) | Orjonikidze 5 | Veszprém Aréna, Veszprém; Attendance: 1,900; Referees: Sándor, Szikszay |
| Round 17; 15 February 2020; 18:00 | 2× (yellow card) | Report | 2× (yellow card) 3× (suspension) | Veszprém Aréna, Veszprém; Attendance: 1,900; Referees: Sándor, Szikszay |

| Round 18; 4 March 2020; 18:00 | Balatonfüredi KSE | 30–33 | Telekom Veszprém | Leisure Centre, Balatonfüred; Attendance: 1,000; Referees: Andorka, Hucker |
| Round 18; 4 March 2020; 18:00 | Topić 11 | (15–15) | Nenadić 6 | Leisure Centre, Balatonfüred; Attendance: 1,000; Referees: Andorka, Hucker |
| Round 18; 4 March 2020; 18:00 | 1× (yellow card) 4× (suspension) | Report | 2× (yellow card) 3× (suspension) | Leisure Centre, Balatonfüred; Attendance: 1,000; Referees: Andorka, Hucker |

| Round 19; 25 February 2020; 18:00 | Telekom Veszprém | 35–23 | Budakalász FKC | Veszprém Aréna, Veszprém; Attendance: 1,300; Referees: Fekete, Tóth |
| Round 19; 25 February 2020; 18:00 | Marguč 9 | (16–12) | Koller 8 | Veszprém Aréna, Veszprém; Attendance: 1,300; Referees: Fekete, Tóth |
| Round 19; 25 February 2020; 18:00 | 3× (yellow card) 1× (suspension) | Report | 1× (yellow card) 3× (suspension) | Veszprém Aréna, Veszprém; Attendance: 1,300; Referees: Fekete, Tóth |

| Round 20 | HE-DO B. Braun Gyöngyös | Cancalled | Telekom Veszprém | Dr. András Fejes Sports Hall, Gyöngyös |

| Round 21 | Dabas VSE KC | Cancalled | Telekom Veszprém | OBO Aréna, Dabas |

| Round 22 | SBS-Eger | Cancalled | Telekom Veszprém | Ferenc Kemény Sports Hall, Eger |

| Round 23 | MOL-Pick Szeged | Cancalled | Telekom Veszprém | Municipal Sports Hall, Szeged |

| Round 24 | Telekom Veszprém | Cancalled | FTC-HungaroControl | Veszprém Aréna, Veszprém |

| Round 25 | Csurgói KK | Cancalled | Telekom Veszprém | László Sótonyi Sports Hall, Csurgó |

| Round 26 | Telekom Veszprém | Cancalled | Sport36-Komló | Veszprém Aréna, Veszprém |

==== Results overview ====
| Opposition | Home score | Away score | Double |
|---|---|---|---|
| Balatonfüredi KSE | 40–28 | 30–33 | 73-58 |
| Budakalász FKC | 35–23 | 24–41 | 76-47 |
| Csurgói KK | 36–20 | ~~3 May~~ | - |
| Dabas VSE KC | 36–17 | ~~24 Mar~~ | - |
| SBS-Eger | 51–30 | ~~31 Mar~~ | - |
| FTC-HungaroControl | ~~25 Apr~~ | 30–35 | - |
| HE-DO B. Braun Gyöngyös | 34–27 | ~~17 Mar~~ | - |
| Sport36-Komló | ~~9 May~~ | 21–24 | - |
| Mezőkövesdi KC | 37–26 | 26–46 | 83-52 |
| Orosházi FKSE- LINAMAR | 33–22 | 25–31 | 64-47 |
| MOL-Pick Szeged | 29–28 | ~~11 Apr~~ | - |
| Grundfos Tatabánya KC | 33–22 | 26–33 | 66-48 |
| Váci KSE | 40–26 | 26–39 | 79-52 |

=== Hungarian Cup ===
==== Matches ====
| 5th round 3 February 2020; 18:00 | Grundfos Tatabánya KC | 16–26 | Telekom Veszprém | Imre Földi Sports Hall, Tatabánya; Attendance: 1,200; Referees: Bócz, Wiedemann |
| 5th round 3 February 2020; 18:00 | Balogh 4 | (9–14) | Gajić 5 | Imre Földi Sports Hall, Tatabánya; Attendance: 1,200; Referees: Bócz, Wiedemann |
| 5th round 3 February 2020; 18:00 | 1× (yellow card) 3× (suspension) | Report | 2× (yellow card) 6× (suspension) | Imre Földi Sports Hall, Tatabánya; Attendance: 1,200; Referees: Bócz, Wiedemann |

Cancelled due to the COVID-19 pandemic.

=== EHF Champions League ===
==== Group stage ====
| Pos | Team | Pld | W | D | L | GF | GA | GD | Pts | Qualification | THW | VES | KIE | MON | POR | VAR | BRE | ZAP |
|---|---|---|---|---|---|---|---|---|---|---|---|---|---|---|---|---|---|---|
| 1 | (Germany) THW Kiel | 14 | 9 | 2 | 3 | 437 | 398 | +39 | 20 (Note: THW Kiel 66–59 Telekom Veszprém) | Quarterfinals | — | 29–28 | 30–30 | 33–32 | 27–28 | 34–23 | 31–23 | 32–32 |
| 2 | (Hungary) Telekom Veszprém | 14 | 10 | 0 | 4 | 448 | 386 | +62 | 20 | First knockout round | 31–37 | — | 28–24 | 24–23 | 38–28 | 39–30 | 31–25 | 40–28 |
| 3 | (Poland) PGE Vive Kielce | 14 | 8 | 2 | 4 | 421 | 389 | +32 | 18 | First knockout round | 32–30 | 34–33 | — | 27–29 | 30–25 | 35–25 | 30–24 | 33–26 |
| 4 | (France) Montpellier Handball | 14 | 8 | 1 | 5 | 386 | 375 | +11 | 17 | First knockout round | 30–33 | 23–18 | 25–24 | — | 22–27 | 31–33 | 30–26 | 34–30 |
| 5 | (Portugal) FC Porto Sofarma | 14 | 6 | 2 | 6 | 400 | 410 | −10 | 14 | First knockout round | 29–30 | 24–31 | 33–30 | 23–23 | — | 30–22 | 27–25 | 35–35 |
| 6 | (North Macedonia) Vardar | 14 | 5 | 1 | 8 | 396 | 444 | −48 | 11 | First knockout round | 20–30 | 29–38 | 28–28 | 27–31 | 32–27 | — | 36–31 | 38–28 |
| 7 | (Belarus) HC Meshkov Brest | 14 | 4 | 0 | 10 | 401 | 431 | −30 | 8 | | 33–30 | 30–37 | 27–31 | 25–27 | 32–35 | 31–22 | — | 33–31 |
| 8 | (Ukraine) HC Motor Zaporizhzhia | 14 | 1 | 2 | 11 | 406 | 462 | −56 | 4 | | 27–30 | 22–32 | 26–33 | 25–26 | 33–29 | 30–31 | 33–36 | — |

Source: EHF
Rules for classification: Tiebreakers

===== Matches =====
| 15 September 2019; 17:00 | Telekom Veszprém | 40–28 | (Ukraine) Motor Zaporizhzhia | Veszprém Aréna, Veszprém; Attendance: 5,019; Referees: Marín, García (ESP) |
| 15 September 2019; 17:00 | Gajić, Tønnesen 6 | (17–13) | Malašinskas, Pukhouski 6 | Veszprém Aréna, Veszprém; Attendance: 5,019; Referees: Marín, García (ESP) |
| 15 September 2019; 17:00 | 4× (suspension) | Report | 5× (yellow card) 2× (suspension) 2× (red card) | Veszprém Aréna, Veszprém; Attendance: 5,019; Referees: Marín, García (ESP) |

| 21 September 2019; 17:30 | Telekom Veszprém | 31–37 | (Germany) THW Kiel | Veszprém Aréna, Veszprém; Attendance: 5,019; Referees: Pavićević, Ražnatović (MNE) |
| 21 September 2019; 17:30 | Nilsson, Omar 5 | (13–16) | Reinkind 8 | Veszprém Aréna, Veszprém; Attendance: 5,019; Referees: Pavićević, Ražnatović (MNE) |
| 21 September 2019; 17:30 | 3× (yellow card) 4× (suspension) | Report | 3× (yellow card) 2× (suspension) | Veszprém Aréna, Veszprém; Attendance: 5,019; Referees: Pavićević, Ražnatović (MNE) |

| 29 September 2019; 19:00 | Montpellier Handball (France) | 23–18 | Telekom Veszprém | Sud de France Arena, Montpellier; Attendance: 3,000; Referees: Zotin, Volodkov (RUS) |
| 29 September 2019; 19:00 | Richardson 8 | (11–10) | Mahé 5 | Sud de France Arena, Montpellier; Attendance: 3,000; Referees: Zotin, Volodkov (RUS) |
| 29 September 2019; 19:00 | 3× (yellow card) 2× (suspension) | Report | 3× (yellow card) 3× (suspension) | Sud de France Arena, Montpellier; Attendance: 3,000; Referees: Zotin, Volodkov (RUS) |

| 13 October 2019; 15:00 | Telekom Veszprém | 38–28 | (Portugal) Porto Sofarma | Veszprém Aréna, Veszprém; Attendance: 4,809; Referees: Sondors, Līcis (LAT) |
| 13 October 2019; 15:00 | Nilsson 8 | (19–16) | Iturriza 6 | Veszprém Aréna, Veszprém; Attendance: 4,809; Referees: Sondors, Līcis (LAT) |
| 13 October 2019; 15:00 | 2× (yellow card) 3× (suspension) | Report | 3× (yellow card) 2× (suspension) | Veszprém Aréna, Veszprém; Attendance: 4,809; Referees: Sondors, Līcis (LAT) |

| 19 October 2019; 17:30 | Telekom Veszprém | 39–30 | (North Macedonia) Vardar | Veszprém Aréna, Veszprém; Attendance: 5,129; Referees: Pichon, Reveret (FRA) |
| 19 October 2019; 17:30 | Lauge Schmidt 8 | (21–17) | Dibirov 8 | Veszprém Aréna, Veszprém; Attendance: 5,129; Referees: Pichon, Reveret (FRA) |
| 19 October 2019; 17:30 | 2× (yellow card) 5× (suspension) 1× (red card) | Report | 5× (yellow card) 2× (suspension) 1× (red card) | Veszprém Aréna, Veszprém; Attendance: 5,129; Referees: Pichon, Reveret (FRA) |

| 2 November 2019; 15:00 | PGE Vive Kielce (Poland) | 34–33 | Telekom Veszprém | Hala Legionów, Kielce; Attendance: 4,200; Referees: Gjeding, Hansen (DEN) |
| 2 November 2019; 15:00 | A. Dujshebaev 11 | (17–17) | Gajić 7 | Hala Legionów, Kielce; Attendance: 4,200; Referees: Gjeding, Hansen (DEN) |
| 2 November 2019; 15:00 | 2× (yellow card) 5× (suspension) | Report | 2× (yellow card) 7× (suspension) | Hala Legionów, Kielce; Attendance: 4,200; Referees: Gjeding, Hansen (DEN) |

| 9 November 2019; 17:30 (19:30 FET) | Meshkov Brest (Belarus) | 30–37 | Telekom Veszprém | Sportshall Victoria, Brest; Attendance: 2,700; Referees: Gubica, Milošević (CRO) |
| 9 November 2019; 17:30 (19:30 FET) | Vailupau 5 | (17–20) | Gajić, Nenadić 8 | Sportshall Victoria, Brest; Attendance: 2,700; Referees: Gubica, Milošević (CRO) |
| 9 November 2019; 17:30 (19:30 FET) | 4× (yellow card) 4× (suspension) | Report | 1× (yellow card) 2× (suspension) | Sportshall Victoria, Brest; Attendance: 2,700; Referees: Gubica, Milošević (CRO) |

| 16 November 2019; 17:30 | Telekom Veszprém | 31–25 | (Belarus) Meshkov Brest | Veszprém Aréna, Veszprém; Attendance: 5,019; Referees: Brunovský, Čanda (SVK) |
| 16 November 2019; 17:30 | three players 5 | (14–14) | Accambray 5 | Veszprém Aréna, Veszprém; Attendance: 5,019; Referees: Brunovský, Čanda (SVK) |
| 16 November 2019; 17:30 | 1× (yellow card) 4× (suspension) | Report | 2× (yellow card) 1× (suspension) | Veszprém Aréna, Veszprém; Attendance: 5,019; Referees: Brunovský, Čanda (SVK) |

| 23 November 2019; 17:30 | Telekom Veszprém | 28–24 | (Poland) PGE Vive Kielce | Veszprém Aréna, Veszprém; Attendance: 5,125; Referees: Mažeika, Gatelis (LTU) |
| 23 November 2019; 17:30 | Nilsson 5 | (13–15) | Karalek 6 | Veszprém Aréna, Veszprém; Attendance: 5,125; Referees: Mažeika, Gatelis (LTU) |
| 23 November 2019; 17:30 | 2× (yellow card) 8× (suspension) | Report | 3× (yellow card) 3× (suspension) | Veszprém Aréna, Veszprém; Attendance: 5,125; Referees: Mažeika, Gatelis (LTU) |

| 1 December 2019; 17:00 | Vardar (North Macedonia) | 29–38 | Telekom Veszprém | Jane Sandanski Arena, Skopje; Attendance: 5,500; Referees: Madsen, Mortensen (DEN) |
| 1 December 2019; 17:00 | Atman 7 | (15–22) | Nenadić 11 | Jane Sandanski Arena, Skopje; Attendance: 5,500; Referees: Madsen, Mortensen (DEN) |
| 1 December 2019; 17:00 | 2× (yellow card) 1× (suspension) | Report | 4× (suspension) 1× (red card) | Jane Sandanski Arena, Skopje; Attendance: 5,500; Referees: Madsen, Mortensen (DEN) |

| 8 February 2020; 16:00 (15:00 WET) | Porto Sofarma (Portugal) | 24–31 | Telekom Veszprém | Dragão Caixa, Porto; Attendance: 1,726; Referees: Erdoğan, Özdeniz (TUR) |
| 8 February 2020; 16:00 (15:00 WET) | Branquinho 6 | (9–14) | Borozan 7 | Dragão Caixa, Porto; Attendance: 1,726; Referees: Erdoğan, Özdeniz (TUR) |
| 8 February 2020; 16:00 (15:00 WET) | 2× (yellow card) 3× (suspension) 1× (red card) | Report | 1× (yellow card) 3× (suspension) | Dragão Caixa, Porto; Attendance: 1,726; Referees: Erdoğan, Özdeniz (TUR) |

| 12 February 2020; 19:00 | THW Kiel (Germany) | 29–28 | Telekom Veszprém | Sparkassen-Arena, Kiel; Attendance: 10,285; Referees: Jurinović, Mrvica (CRO) |
| 12 February 2020; 19:00 | Ekberg 8 | (15–15) | Borozan, Nilsson 5 | Sparkassen-Arena, Kiel; Attendance: 10,285; Referees: Jurinović, Mrvica (CRO) |
| 12 February 2020; 19:00 | 1× (yellow card) 1× (suspension) | Report | 3× (yellow card) 2× (suspension) | Sparkassen-Arena, Kiel; Attendance: 10,285; Referees: Jurinović, Mrvica (CRO) |

| 23 February 2020; 17:00 | Telekom Veszprém | 24–23 | (France) Montpellier Handball | Veszprém Aréna, Veszprém; Attendance: 5,019; Referees: Kurtagic, Wetterwik (SWE) |
| 23 February 2020; 17:00 | Gajić 7 | (16–14) | Descat 6 | Veszprém Aréna, Veszprém; Attendance: 5,019; Referees: Kurtagic, Wetterwik (SWE) |
| 23 February 2020; 17:00 | 1× (yellow card) 3× (suspension) | Report | 2× (yellow card) 1× (suspension) | Veszprém Aréna, Veszprém; Attendance: 5,019; Referees: Kurtagic, Wetterwik (SWE) |

| 29 February 2020; 17:30 (18:30 EET) | Motor Zaporizhzhia (Ukraine) | 22–32 | Telekom Veszprém | Sport Palace Yunost, Zaporizhzhia; Attendance: 1,200; Referees: Horáček, Novotný (CZE) |
| 29 February 2020; 17:30 (18:30 EET) | Denysov 5 | (8–17) | Gajić 5 | Sport Palace Yunost, Zaporizhzhia; Attendance: 1,200; Referees: Horáček, Novotný (CZE) |
| 29 February 2020; 17:30 (18:30 EET) | 2× (yellow card) 2× (suspension) | Report | 2× (yellow card) 2× (suspension) | Sport Palace Yunost, Zaporizhzhia; Attendance: 1,200; Referees: Horáček, Novotný (CZE) |

===== Results overview =====
| Opposition | Home score | Away score | Double |
|---|---|---|---|
| (North Macedonia) Vardar | 39–30 | 29–38 | 77-59 |
| (Poland) PGE Vive Kielce | 28–24 | 34–33 | 61-58 |
| (Belarus) Meshkov Brest | 31–25 | 30–37 | 68-55 |
| (Ukraine) Motor Zaporizhzhia | 40–28 | 22–32 | 72-50 |
| (France) Montpellier Handball | 24–23 | 23–18 | 42-46 |
| (Portugal) Porto Sofarma | 38–28 | 24–31 | 69-52 |
| (Germany) THW Kiel | 31–37 | 29–28 | 59-66 |

==== Knockout stage ====
===== Round of 16 =====
| 21 March 2020; 18:00 | Orlen Wisła Płock (Poland) | – | Telekom Veszprém | Orlen Arena, Płock |
| 21 March 2020; 18:00 | | (–) | | Orlen Arena, Płock |
| 21 March 2020; 18:00 | | Report | | Orlen Arena, Płock |

| 7 March 2020; 15:00 | Telekom Veszprém | – | (Poland) Orlen Wisła Płock | Veszprém Aréna, Veszprém |
| 7 March 2020; 15:00 | | (–) | | Veszprém Aréna, Veszprém |
| 7 March 2020; 15:00 | | Report | | Veszprém Aréna, Veszprém |

=== SEHA League ===
==== Group phase ====
| Pos | Team | Pld | W | D | L | GF | GA | GD | Pts | Qualification | VES | ZAG | MES | RAB | MET | SPA |
|---|---|---|---|---|---|---|---|---|---|---|---|---|---|---|---|---|
| 1 | (Hungary) Telekom Veszprém | 10 | 8 | 0 | 2 | 306 | 265 | +41 | 24 | Quarter finals | — | 36–28 | 32–23 | 35–24 | 36–29 | 37–32 |
| 2 | (Croatia) PPD Zagreb | 10 | 7 | 0 | 3 | 289 | 259 | +30 | 21 | Quarter finals | 23–26 | — | 30–24 | 24–23 | 30–25 | 30–17 |
| 3 | (Belarus) Meshkov Brest | 10 | 6 | 0 | 4 | 307 | 279 | +28 | 18 | Playoffs | 27–28 | 33–29 | — | 31–22 | 32–21 | 35–24 |
| 4 | (North Macedonia) Eurofarm Rabotnik | 10 | 4 | 0 | 6 | 279 | 275 | +4 | 12 | Playoffs | 26–24 | 27–28 | 32–35 | — | 32–21 | 34–29 |
| 5 | (Serbia) Metaloplastika | 10 | 4 | 0 | 6 | 272 | 302 | −30 | 12 | Playoffs | 30–26 | 25–28 | 35–33 | 27–26 | — | 27–23 |
| 6 | (Russia) Spartak Moscow | 10 | 1 | 0 | 9 | 254 | 327 | −73 | 3 | Playoffs | 23–26 | 23–39 | 26–34 | 21–33 | 36–32 | — |

Source: SEHA

===== Matches =====
| 3 September 2019; 17:15 (18:15 FET) | Meshkov Brest (Belarus) | 27–28 | Telekom Veszprém | Sportshall Victoria, Brest; Attendance: 1,000; Referees: Boričić, Marković (SRB) |
| 3 September 2019; 17:15 (18:15 FET) | Ðukić 8 | (14–16) | Lauge Schmidt 6 | Sportshall Victoria, Brest; Attendance: 1,000; Referees: Boričić, Marković (SRB) |
| 3 September 2019; 17:15 (18:15 FET) | 3× (suspension) | Report | 6× (suspension) | Sportshall Victoria, Brest; Attendance: 1,000; Referees: Boričić, Marković (SRB) |

| 7 September 2019; 19:00 | Telekom Veszprém | 36–28 | (Croatia) PPD Zagreb | Veszprém Aréna, Veszprém; Attendance: 3,840; Referees: Mitrevski, Todorovski (MKD) |
| 7 September 2019; 19:00 | Blagotinšek, Štrlek 5 | (17–15) | Hrstić 5 | Veszprém Aréna, Veszprém; Attendance: 3,840; Referees: Mitrevski, Todorovski (MKD) |
| 7 September 2019; 19:00 | 3× (suspension) | Report | 3× (suspension) | Veszprém Aréna, Veszprém; Attendance: 3,840; Referees: Mitrevski, Todorovski (MKD) |

| 24 September 2019; 18:45 (19:45 MSK) | Spartak Moscow (Russia) | 23–26 | Telekom Veszprém | Dynamo Sports Palace, Moscow; Attendance: 500; Referees: Nabokau, Kulik (BLR) |
| 24 September 2019; 18:45 (19:45 MSK) | Tsakharias, Ryabov 6 | (14–14) | Ilics 7 | Dynamo Sports Palace, Moscow; Attendance: 500; Referees: Nabokau, Kulik (BLR) |
| 24 September 2019; 18:45 (19:45 MSK) | 3× (suspension) | Report | 3× (suspension) | Dynamo Sports Palace, Moscow; Attendance: 500; Referees: Nabokau, Kulik (BLR) |

| 2 October 2019; 17:15 | Eurofarm Rabotnik (North Macedonia) | 26–24 | Telekom Veszprém | Sports Hall Boro Čurlevski, Bitola; Attendance: 3,000; Referees: Jurinović, Mrvica (CRO) |
| 2 October 2019; 17:15 | Jotić 8 | (14–8) | Gajić 9 | Sports Hall Boro Čurlevski, Bitola; Attendance: 3,000; Referees: Jurinović, Mrvica (CRO) |
| 2 October 2019; 17:15 | | Report | 3× (suspension) | Sports Hall Boro Čurlevski, Bitola; Attendance: 3,000; Referees: Jurinović, Mrvica (CRO) |

| 5 October 2019; 20:45 | Telekom Veszprém | 32–23 | (Belarus) Meshkov Brest | Veszprém Aréna, Veszprém; Attendance: 2,567; Referees: Ershov, Pavliukov (RUS) |
| 5 October 2019; 20:45 | Štrlek 8 | (15–11) | Vailupau 12 | Veszprém Aréna, Veszprém; Attendance: 2,567; Referees: Ershov, Pavliukov (RUS) |
| 5 October 2019; 20:45 | 5× (suspension) | Report | 4× (suspension) | Veszprém Aréna, Veszprém; Attendance: 2,567; Referees: Ershov, Pavliukov (RUS) |

| 5 November 2019; 17:15 | Telekom Veszprém | 37–32 | (Russia) Spartak Moscow | Veszprém Aréna, Veszprém; Attendance: 2,345; Referees: Boričić, Marković (SRB) |
| 5 November 2019; 17:15 | Manaskov 10 | (17–13) | Ryabov 8 | Veszprém Aréna, Veszprém; Attendance: 2,345; Referees: Boričić, Marković (SRB) |
| 5 November 2019; 17:15 | 3× (suspension) | Report | | Veszprém Aréna, Veszprém; Attendance: 2,345; Referees: Boričić, Marković (SRB) |

| 19 November 2019; 19:00 | Telekom Veszprém | 36–29 | (Serbia) Metaloplastika | Veszprém Aréna, Veszprém; Attendance: 1,457; Referees: Jurinović, Mrvica (CRO) |
| 19 November 2019; 19:00 | three players 6 | (21–13) | Milić 7 | Veszprém Aréna, Veszprém; Attendance: 1,457; Referees: Jurinović, Mrvica (CRO) |
| 19 November 2019; 19:00 | 4× (suspension) | Report | 5× (suspension) 1× (red card) | Veszprém Aréna, Veszprém; Attendance: 1,457; Referees: Jurinović, Mrvica (CRO) |

| 11 December 2019; 17:00 | Telekom Veszprém | 35–24 | (North Macedonia) Eurofarm Rabotnik | Veszprém Aréna, Veszprém; Attendance: 1,725; Referees: Jurinović, Mrvica (CRO) |
| 11 December 2019; 17:00 | Gajić, Nilsson 5 | (17–10) | Petrovski 4 | Veszprém Aréna, Veszprém; Attendance: 1,725; Referees: Jurinović, Mrvica (CRO) |
| 11 December 2019; 17:00 | 1× (suspension) | Report | 2× (suspension) | Veszprém Aréna, Veszprém; Attendance: 1,725; Referees: Jurinović, Mrvica (CRO) |

| 13 December 2019; 19:00 | Metaloplastika (Serbia) | 30–26 | Telekom Veszprém | Zorka Hall, Šabac; Attendance: 1,000; Referees: Načevski, Nikolov (MKD) |
| 13 December 2019; 19:00 | Đukić, Kljajić 4 | (18–15) | Paczkowski, Štrlek 9 | Zorka Hall, Šabac; Attendance: 1,000; Referees: Načevski, Nikolov (MKD) |
| 13 December 2019; 19:00 | 3× (suspension) | Report | 4× (suspension) | Zorka Hall, Šabac; Attendance: 1,000; Referees: Načevski, Nikolov (MKD) |

| 14 December 2019; 20:45 | PPD Zagreb (Croatia) | 23–26 | Telekom Veszprém | Dom Sportova, Zagreb; Attendance: 1,000; Referees: Mitrevski, Todorovski (MKD) |
| 14 December 2019; 20:45 | Gadža 5 | (13–13) | Omar, Borozan 5 | Dom Sportova, Zagreb; Attendance: 1,000; Referees: Mitrevski, Todorovski (MKD) |
| 14 December 2019; 20:45 | 3× (suspension) | Report | 2× (suspension) | Dom Sportova, Zagreb; Attendance: 1,000; Referees: Mitrevski, Todorovski (MKD) |

===== Results overview =====
| Opposition | Home score | Away score | Double |
|---|---|---|---|
| (Belarus) Meshkov Brest | 32–23 | 27–28 | 60-50 |
| (Croatia) PPD Zagreb | 36–28 | 23–26 | 62-51 |
| (North Macedonia) Eurofarm Rabotnik | 35–24 | 26–24 | 59-50 |
| (Serbia) Metaloplastika | 36–29 | 30–26 | 62-59 |
| (Russia) Spartak Moscow | 37–32 | 23–26 | 63-55 |

==== Knockout stage ====
===== Quarterfinals =====
| 8 March 2020; 13:00 | Vojvodina (Serbia) | 26–31 | Telekom Veszprém | Sportski centar Slana Bara, Novi Sad; Attendance: 1,250; Referees: Metalari, Nikolovski (MKD) |
| 8 March 2020; 13:00 | Stojković 9 | (10–15) | Štrlek 7 | Sportski centar Slana Bara, Novi Sad; Attendance: 1,250; Referees: Metalari, Nikolovski (MKD) |
| 8 March 2020; 13:00 | 2× (yellow card) 5× (suspension) | Report | 6× (suspension) | Sportski centar Slana Bara, Novi Sad; Attendance: 1,250; Referees: Metalari, Nikolovski (MKD) |

| 14 March 2020; 19:00 | Telekom Veszprém | – | (Serbia) Vojvodina | Veszprém Aréna, Veszprém |
| 14 March 2020; 19:00 | | (–) | | Veszprém Aréna, Veszprém |
| 14 March 2020; 19:00 | | [ Report] | | Veszprém Aréna, Veszprém |

== Statistics ==
=== Top scorers ===
Includes all competitive matches. The list is sorted by shirt number when total goals are equal.

Last updated on 28 December 2019

| Position | Nation | No. | Name | Hungarian League | Hungarian Cup | Champions League | SEHA League | Total |
|---|---|---|---|---|---|---|---|---|
| 1 | (Slovenia) | 17 | Dragan Gajić | 41 | 0 | 42 | 27 | 110 |
| 2 | (Croatia) | 26 | Manuel Štrlek | 50 | 0 | 31 | 26 | 107 |
| 3 | (Serbia) | 34 | Petar Nenadić | 27 | 0 | 53 | 11 | 91 |
| 4 | (Denmark) | 25 | Rasmus Lauge Schmidt | 17 | 0 | 42 | 18 | 79 |
| | (North Macedonia) | 2 | Dejan Manaskov | 37 | 0 | 12 | 30 | 79 |
| 6 | (Egypt) | 5 | Yahia Omar | 39 | 0 | 17 | 19 | 77 |
| 7 | (Sweden) | 18 | Andreas Nilsson | 21 | 0 | 30 | 25 | 76 |
| 8 | (Montenegro) | 87 | Vuko Borozan | 34 | 0 | 26 | 12 | 72 |
| 9 | (Slovenia) | 24 | Gašper Marguč | 45 | 0 | 13 | 13 | 71 |
| 10 | (Slovenia) | 51 | Borut Mačkovšek | 36 | 0 | 6 | 24 | 66 |
| 11 | (Slovenia) | 31 | Blaž Blagotinšek | 27 | 0 | 11 | 16 | 56 |
| 12 | (Norway) | 15 | Kent Robin Tønnesen | 21 | 0 | 28 | - | 49 |
| 13 | (Brazil) | 13 | Dmitry Zhitnikov | 25 | 0 | 9 | 5 | 39 |
| 14 | (France) | 35 | Kentin Mahé | 21 | 0 | 8 | - | 29 |
| 15 | (Hungary) | 66 | Máté Lékai | 13 | 0 | 4 | 7 | 24 |
| 16 | (Hungary) | 43 | Zoran Ilics | 1 | 0 | - | 12 | 13 |
| | (Romania) | 47 | Márk Bodor | 5 | 0 | - | 8 | 13 |
| 18 | (Poland) | 22 | Paweł Paczkowski | 2 | 0 | - | 10 | 12 |
| 19 | (Hungary) | 46 | Viktor Melnyicsuk | 2 | 0 | - | - | 2 |
| | (Hungary) | 53 | Bence Szűcs | 2 | 0 | - | 0 | 2 |
| 21 | (Spain) | 1 | Arpad Sterbik | 1 | 0 | 0 | 0 | 1 |
| | | | TOTALS | 19 | 0 | 27 | | |

=== Attendances ===
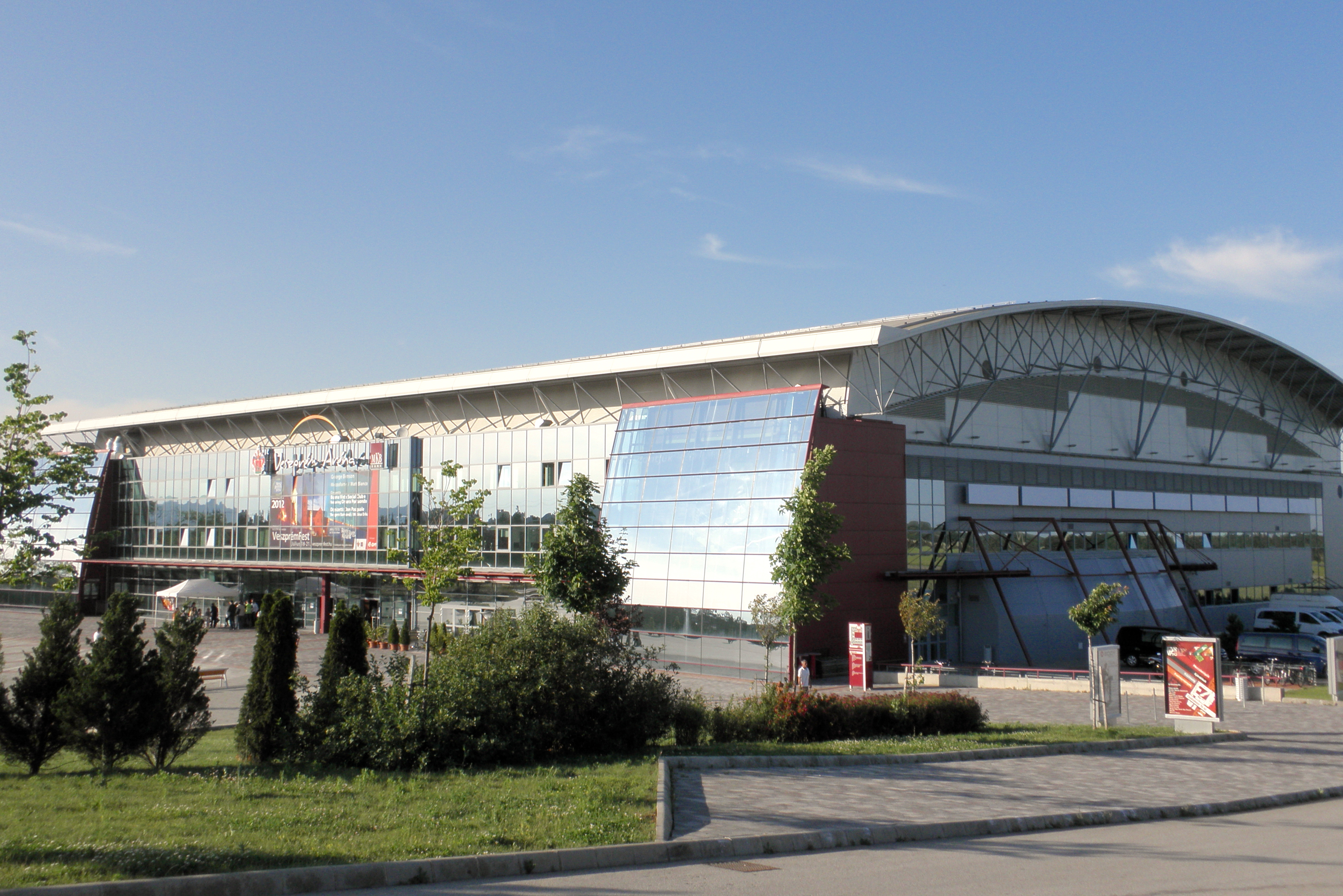
Home hall: Veszprém Aréna

List of the home matches:

| Round | Against | Attadance | Capatility | Date |
|---|---|---|---|---|
| NB I- 8. | Dabas VSE KC | 1,725 | 33,4% | August 23, 2019 |
| NB I- 5. | Balatonfüredi KSE | 2,859 | 55,3% | August 25, 2019 |
| NB I- 9. | SBS-Eger | 1,600 | 31,0% | August 27, 2019 |
| NB I- 1. | Váci KSE | 1,237 | 23,9% | August 31, 2019 |
| SEHA- 3. | PPD Zagreb (Croatia) | 3,840 | 76,5% | September 7, 2019 |
| NB I- 2. | Grundfos Tatabánya KC | 2,876 | 55,6% | September 10, 2019 |
| CL-(GS) 1. | Motor Zaporizhzhia (Ukraine) | 5,019 | 100,0% | September 15, 2019 |
| CL-(GS) 2. | THW Kiel (Germany) | 5,019 | 100,0% | September 21, 2019 |
| SEHA- 6. | Meshkov Brest (Belarus) | 2,567 | 51,1% | October 5, 2019 |
| CL-(GS) 4. | Porto Sofarma (Portugal) | 4,809 | 95,8% | October 13, 2019 |
| NB I- 7. | HE-DO B. Braun Gyöngyös | 1,725 | 33,9% | October 15, 2019 |
| CL-(GS) 5. | Vardar (North Macedonia) | 5,129 | 100,0% | October 19, 2019 |
| SEHA- 7. | Spartak Moscow (Russia) | 2,345 | 46,7% | November 5, 2019 |
| NB I- 10. | Csurgói KK | 2,345 | 45,4% | November 5, 2019 |
| CL-(GS) 8. | Meshkov Brest (Belarus) | 5,019 | 100,0% | November 16, 2019 |
| SEHA- 5. | Metaloplastika (Serbia) | 1,457 | 29,0% | November 19, 2019 |
| CL-(GS) 9. | PGE Vive Kielce (Poland) | 5,125 | 100,0% | November 23, 2019 |
| NB I- 12. | MOL-Pick Szeged | 5,156 | 99,7% | December 7, 2019 |
| NB I- 3. | Mezőkövesdi KC | 1,071 | 20,7% | December 9, 2019 |
| SEHA- 9. | Eurofarm Rabotnik (North Macedonia) | 1,725 | 34,4% | December 11, 2019 |
| NB I- 17. | Orosházi FKSE- LINAMAR | 1,900 | 36,8% | February 15, 2020 |
| CL-(GS) 13. | Montpellier Handball (France) | 5,019 | 100,0% | February 23, 2020 |
| NB I- 19. | Budakalász FKC | 1,300 | 25,1% | February 25, 2020 |
| SEHA- QF | | | % | March 14, 2020 |
