= Veszprém KKFT Felsőörs =

Hungarian handball club

Veszprémi KKFT
- Full name: Veszprémi KKFT
- Nickname(s): Éles-Veszprém, Kis Veszprém
- Short name: Veszprém
- Arena: Március 15. úti Sportcsarnok, Veszprém
- Capacity: 2,200
- President: József Éles
- Head coach: Dinko Đanković
- League: Nemzeti Bajnokság I/B
- Club colours
Home	Away

Veszprémi KKFT is a Hungarian handball club from Veszprém, that plays in the Nemzeti Bajnokság I/B, the second level championship in Hungary.

Location of Veszprémi KKFT

== Crest, colours, supporters ==
=== Naming history ===
Name	Period
Veszprémi Egyetemi SC	−2015
Veszprémi KSE	2015–2017
Veszprémi KKFT Felsőörs	2017–2021
Fejér B.Á.L. Veszprém	2021–2024
Veszprémi KKFT	2024–present

=== Kit manufacturers and shirt sponsor ===
The following table shows in detail Veszprémi KKFT Felsőörs kit manufacturers and shirt sponsors by year:

Period	Kit manufacturer	Shirt sponsor
–2020	(Germany) Erima	Primavera / Veszprém / Euronics
2020–	(Germany) Erima	tippmix / Veszprém / Völgység Agrár

=== Kits ===
HOME
2017–18	2018–19	2019–20	2020–21	2021–22	2022–23	2023–24

AWAY
2017–18	2018–19	2019–20	2020–21	2021–22	2022–23

THIRD
2020–21	2021–22	2022–23

== Sports Hall information ==
- Name: – Március 15. úti Sportcsarnok
- City: – Veszprém
- Capacity: – 2200
- Address: – 8200 Veszprém, Március 15. u. 5.

== Management ==
Position	Name
Executive Director	(Hungary) József Éles
Technical director	(Hungary) Gábor Danyi

== Team ==
=== Current squad ===
Squad for the 2024–25 season

Veszprémi KKFT

Goalkeepers

- 97 (Hungary) Bence Gödör
- (Hungary) Tamás Konyicsák

Left Wingers
Right Wingers

- 14 (Hungary) Péter Szmetán
- 17 (Hungary) Ákos Preszter
- 29 (Hungary) Bence Hornyák

Line Players

- 11 (Hungary) Péter Grünfelder
- (Hungary) Dániel Gajdos

Central Backs
Left Backs
Right Backs

- (Hungary) Patrik Markovics

=== Technical staff ===
- Head coach: (Croatia) Dinko Đanković
- Goalkeeper coach: (Hungary) Nándor Fazekas
- Fitness coach: (Hungary) József Széles
- Masseur: (Hungary) Gábor Nagy
- Club doctor: (Hungary) Dr. András Szoboszlai

=== Transfers ===
Transfers for the 2024–25 season

Joining

- (Hungary) Patrik Markovics (RB) from (Hungary) Ceglédi KKSE
- (Hungary) Dániel Gajdos (LP) from (Hungary) PLER-Budapest
- (Hungary) Tamás Konyicsák (GK) from (Hungary) Ózdi KC
- (Hungary) Bence Bali (LP) on loan from (Hungary) NEKA

Leaving

- (Serbia) Milos Mojsilov (GK) to (Romania) CSM Bacău
- (Serbia) Borivoje Djukic (LB) to (Serbia) RK Metaloplastika
- (Bosnia and Herzegovina) Marko Tarabochia (CB) to (Croatia) RK Metković
- (Egypt) Khaled Essam (LW) to (Hungary) Budai Farkasok KKUK
- (Hungary) Tibor Balogh (GK) to (Hungary) Budai Farkasok KKUK
- (Hungary) Mátyás Kristóf (CB) to (Hungary) Budai Farkasok KKUK
- (Hungary) Lev Szuharev (RB) to (Germany) TUSEM Essen
- (Hungary) Bence Gödör (GK) to (Germany) EHV Aue
- (Hungary) Levente Hári (LW) to (Hungary) Győri ETO-UNI FKC
- (Hungary) Máté Fazekas (LB) to (Hungary) Győri ETO-UNI FKC
- (Hungary) Levente Szrnka (LP) to (Hungary) Carbonex-Komló
- (Hungary) Benedek Pintér (CB) to (Hungary) NEKA
- (Hungary) Dávid Bugyáki (LP) to (Hungary) NEKA
- (Hungary) Gábor Pulay (RB) to (Hungary) Szigetszentmiklósi KSK
- (Hungary) Bence Vetési (CB) to (Hungary) Ceglédi KKSE
- (Hungary) Máté Racskó (RB) to (Hungary) Ceglédi KKSE
- (Hungary) Gellért Draskovics (LB) loan back to (Hungary) Balatonfüredi KSE
- (Hungary) Péter Grünfelder (LP) to (Hungary) NEKA
- (Hungary) Péter Szmetán (RW) to (Hungary) Budakalász FKC

Transfers for the 2023–24 season

Joining

- (Serbia) Milos Mojsilov (GK) from (Greece) A.C. PAOK
- (Serbia) Borivoje Djukic (LB) from (Romania) CSM Oradea
- (Egypt) Khaled Essam (LW) from (Hungary) Budai Farkasok KKUK
- (Hungary) Bence Hornyák (RW) from (Hungary) MOL Tatabánya KC
- (Hungary) Péter Grünfelder (LP) from (Hungary) Sport36-Komló
- (Hungary) Lev Szuharev (RB) from (Hungary) Sport36-Komló
- (Hungary) Benedek Pintér (CB) from (Hungary) BFKA-Veszprém
- (Hungary) Gellért Draskovics (LB) on loan from (Hungary) Balatonfüredi KSE
- (Hungary) Bence Gödör (GK) from (Austria) JAGS Vöslau
- (Bosnia and Herzegovina) Marko Tarabochia (CB) from (Hungary) Dabas KK

Leaving

- (Slovakia) Šimon Macháč (LP) to (Slovakia) MŠK Považská Bystrica
- (Hungary) Benedek Éles (LB) to (Germany) GWD Minden
- (Hungary) János Stranigg (LB) to (France) US Créteil Handball
- (Hungary) Gergő Miklós (GK) to (Finland) Riihimäki Cocks
- (Hungary) Péter Tóth (RW) to (Hungary) Csurgói KK
- (Hungary) János Podoba (GK) to (Hungary) HE-DO B. Braun Gyöngyös
- (Hungary) Marcell Ludmán (LB) to (Hungary) NEKA
- (Hungary) Dominik Gál (LP) to (Hungary) NEKA
- (Hungary) Balázs Molnár (LW) to (Germany) OHV Aurich
- (Hungary) Mátyás Seregi (LW) to (Hungary) Acélváros KK

Transfers for the 2022–23 season

Joining

- (Slovakia) Šimon Macháč (LP) from (Hungary) SBS-Eger
- (Hungary) Tibor Balogh (GK) from (Hungary) SBS-Eger
- (Hungary) Gábor Pulay (RB) from (Hungary) SBS-Eger
- (Hungary) Balázs Molnár (LW) from (Hungary) SBS-Eger
- (Hungary) János Stranigg (LB) from (Hungary) NEKA
- (Hungary) Bence Vetési (CB) from (Hungary) Kecskeméti TE
- (Hungary) Levente Szrnka (LP) from (Hungary) Kecskeméti TE
- (Hungary) Marcell Ludmán (LB) from (Hungary) Pick Szeged
- (Hungary) Dominik Gál (LP) from (Croatia) HRK Gorica

Leaving

- (Hungary) Ádám Borbély (GK) to (Hungary) Ferencvárosi TC
- (Hungary) Gergő Fazekas (CB) to (Hungary) Telekom Veszprém
- (Hungary) Huba Vajda (LP) to (Hungary) Balatonfüredi KSE
- (Hungary) József Tóth (LP) (retires)
- (Hungary) Bálint Somogyi (LB) to (Italy) Polisportiva Cingoli
- (Hungary) Márton Tóth (CB) to (Hungary) Ceglédi KKSE
- (Hungary) Máté Kurucz (RB) to (Hungary) SBS-Eger
- (Hungary) Ákos Széles (RB) to (Hungary) Budai Farkasok KKUK

Transfers for the 2021–22 season

Joining

- (Hungary) Péter Tóth (RW) from (Hungary) NEKA
- (Hungary) József Tóth (LP) from (Hungary) Pick Szeged
- (Hungary) János Podoba (GK) from (Hungary) Dabas KK
- (Hungary) Máté Kurucz (RB) from (Hungary) Dabas KK

Leaving

- (Hungary) Bence Bartha (LB) to (France) Strasbourg Eurométropole HB
- (Hungary) Áron Füleki (LP) (retires)
- (Hungary) Áron Ágoston (GK) to (Hungary) Balatonfüredi KSE
- (Hungary) László Szeitl (LP) to (Hungary) NEKA
- (Hungary) Benedek Szakály (RW) to (Hungary) PLER KC
- (Hungary) Attila Tóth (RB) to (Hungary) PLER KC

Transfers for the 2020–21 season

Joining

- (Hungary) Ádám Borbély (GK) from (Hungary) Grundfos Tatabánya KC
- (Hungary) Attila Tóth (RB) from (Hungary) DVTK-Eger
- (Hungary) Huba Vajda (LP) from (Hungary) Balatonfüredi KSE
- (Hungary) Benedek Szakály (RW) from (Hungary) Ferencvárosi TC
- (Hungary) Péter Tóth (RW) on loan from (Hungary) NEKA

Leaving

- (Hungary) Zsolt Szász (GK) (retires)
- (Hungary) Milán Szép (CB) to (Italy) Pallamano Pressano
- (Hungary) Balázs Boros (RB) to (Hungary) Budai Farkasok KKUK
- (Hungary) Máté Szmetán (CB) to (Hungary) Balatonfüredi KSE
- (Hungary) Zsolt Radvánszki (LP) to (Hungary) NEKA
- (Hungary) István Varga (GK) to (Hungary) Mezőkövesdi KC
- (Hungary) Bence Bartha (LB) on loan at (Hungary) Tatai AC

Transfers for the 2019–20 season

Joining

- (Hungary) Áron Ágoston (GK) from (Hungary) Balatonfüredi KSE
- (Hungary) Gergő Miklós (GK) from (Hungary) Tungsram SE Nagykanizsa
- (Hungary) Balázs Boros (RB) from (Hungary) Tatai AC

Leaving

- (Hungary) Norbert Gyene (RW) to (Hungary) Ceglédi KKSE
- (Hungary) Márk Holló (GK) to (Hungary) Balmazújvárosi KK
- (Hungary) Csaba Anderlik (GK) to (Hungary) Rév TSC
- (Hungary) Bence Priczel (LP) to (Hungary) Rév TSC
- (Hungary) Erhárd Sisa (LW) to (Hungary) Telekom Veszprém U21
- (Hungary) Barnabás Nagy (GK)

Transfers for the 2018–19 season

Joining

- (Hungary) Norbert Gyene (RW) from (Hungary) Orosházi FKSE
- (Hungary) Márk Holló (GK) from (Hungary) Gyöngyösi KK
- (Hungary) Csaba Anderlik (GK) from (Hungary) NEKA
- (Hungary) Bálint Somogyi (CB) from (Hungary) NEKA
- (Hungary) Barnabás Nagy (GK) from (Hungary) Telekom Veszprém U20
- (Hungary) Mátyás Kristóf (CB) from (Hungary) Telekom Veszprém U20
- (Hungary) Gergő Bárdos (LB) from (Hungary) KK Ajka
- (Hungary) László Szeitl (LP) from (Hungary) Dabas KK
- (Hungary) Bence Priczel (LP) from (Hungary) Dabas KK
- (Hungary) Attila Tóth (RB) from (Hungary) Csurgói KK

Leaving

- (Hungary) Zsolt Szobol (RB) (retires)
- (Hungary) Viktor Melnicsuk (CB) to (Hungary) Telekom Veszprém
- (Hungary) Patrik Árpási (LP) to (Hungary) FKSE Algyő
- (Hungary) Gábor Andorka (GK) to (Hungary) PLER KC
- (Hungary) Balázs Márton (LB) to (Hungary) PLER KC
- (Hungary) Ákos Bendicsek (LB) to (Hungary) Telekom Veszprém U21
- (Hungary) Gergő Haszilló (LB) to (Hungary) Vecsési SE
- (Hungary) Márk Kreisz (CB) to (Hungary) Százhalombattai KE
- (Hungary) Bence Csíki (GK) to (Germany) SG Regensburg
- (Hungary) Bence Sneider (GK) to (Hungary) Nyírbátori SC
- (Hungary) Gergő Bárdos (LB) to (Hungary) Alba Regia KSE

== Previous squads ==
2021–2022 Team
Shirt No	Nationality	Player	Birth Date	Position
1	Hungary	János Podoba	11 July 2000 (age 26)	Goalkeeper
2	Hungary	Péter Tóth	28 June 2000 (age 26)	Right Winger
11	Hungary	Bálint Somogyi	5 May 1998 (age 28)	Left Back
14	Hungary	Péter Szmetán	14 March 1999 (age 27)	Right Winger
15	Hungary	Levente Hári	20 September 1999 (age 26)	Left Winger
16	Hungary	Ádám Borbély	22 June 1995 (age 31)	Goalkeeper
19	Hungary	Benedek Éles	6 September 1999 (age 26)	Left Back
22	Hungary	Máté Kurucz	10 February 2000 (age 26)	Right Back
24	Hungary	Gergő Fazekas	31 October 2003 (age 22)	Central Back
30	Hungary	Mátyás Kristóf	22 April 1998 (age 28)	Central Back
42	Hungary	Mátyás Seregi	7 February 2001 (age 25)	Left Winger
47	Hungary	Márton Tóth	10 April 1998 (age 28)	Central Back
48	Hungary	József Tóth	23 June 1999 (age 27)	Line Player
55	Hungary	Gergő Miklós	4 November 1994 (age 31)	Goalkeeper
59	Hungary	Ákos Széles	19 October 2000 (age 25)	Right Back
61	Hungary	Dávid Bugyáki	23 May 1998 (age 28)	Line Player
78	Hungary	Huba Vajda	5 March 2000 (age 26)	Line Player

2018–2019 Team
Shirt No	Nationality	Player	Birth Date	Position
1	Hungary	Zsolt Szász	17 November 1991 (age 34)	Goalkeeper
3	Hungary	László Szeitl	1 June 1994 (age 32)	Line Player
5	Hungary	Norbert Gyene	18 April 1994 (age 32)	Right Winger
11	Hungary	Bálint Somogyi	5 May 1998 (age 28)	Left Back
13	Hungary	Áron Füleki	10 February 1989 (age 37)	Line Player
14	Hungary	Péter Szmetán	14 March 1999 (age 27)	Right Winger
15	Hungary	Levente Hári	20 September 1999 (age 26)	Left Winger
19	Hungary	Benedek Éles	6 September 1999 (age 26)	Left Back
24	Hungary	Gergő Fazekas	31 October 2003 (age 22)	Central Back
26	Hungary	Zsolt Radvánszki	24 December 2002 (age 23)	Line Player
30	Hungary	Mátyás Kristóf	22 April 1998 (age 28)	Central Back
33	Hungary	Bence Priczel	27 July 1993 (age 33)	Line Player
41	Hungary	Barnabás Nagy	8 June 1998 (age 28)	Goalkeeper
46	Hungary	Gergő Szöllőskei	10 October 1998 (age 27)	Left Winger
47	Hungary	Márton Tóth	10 April 1998 (age 28)	Central Back
50	Italy	Nicolas Dainese	20 November 1999 (age 26)	Left Back
57	Hungary	Attila Tóth	17 March 1997 (age 29)	Right Back
58	Hungary	Bence Bartha	20 June 1999 (age 27)	Right Back
61	Hungary	Dávid Bugyáki	23 May 1998 (age 28)	Line Player
71	Hungary	Zsolt Heiczinger	24 March 1988 (age 38)	Line Player
72	Hungary	Márk Holló	20 July 1995 (age 31)	Goalkeeper
91	Hungary	Gergő Bárdos	9 January 1990 (age 36)	Left Back
93	Hungary	Csaba Anderlik	14 August 1998 (age 27)	Goalkeeper

2015–2016 Team
Shirt No	Nationality	Player	Birth Date	Position
1	Hungary	Imre Szabó	2 July 1978 (age 48)	Goalkeeper
2	Hungary	Máté Gulás	28 June 1993 (age 33)	Central Back
3	Hungary	Péter Valler	17 September 1996 (age 29)	Right Winger
4	Hungary	Balázs Márton	9 June 1995 (age 31)	Left Back
5	Hungary	Bence Kisék	4 July 1993 (age 33)	Central Back
6	Hungary	Péter Patkós	15 February 1992 (age 34)	Central Back
8	Hungary	Ákos Kis	31 December 1975 (age 50)	Left Back
10	Hungary	Gábor Lelkes	17 May 1982 (age 44)	Right Back
12	Hungary	Barnabás Bence Csíki	23 November 1995 (age 30)	Goalkeeper
15	Hungary	István Pásztor	5 June 1971 (age 55)	Left Winger
16	Hungary	Zsolt Szász	17 November 1991 (age 34)	Goalkeeper
17	Hungary	György Kovács	23 February 1984 (age 42)	Line Player
18	Hungary	Csaba Tombor	14 April 1979 (age 47)	Right Winger
19	Hungary	Zsolt Szobol	24 November 1978 (age 47)	Right Back
22	Hungary	Dániel Márkus	22 February 1993 (age 33)	Central Back
25	Hungary	Máté Kurucz	10 February 2000 (age 26)	Right Back
31	Hungary	Géza Vasvári	14 March 1992 (age 34)	Line Player
33	Hungary	Tibor Bonyhádi	22 July 1993 (age 33)	Left Winger
44	Hungary	Olivér Tarlósi	15 November 1991 (age 34)	Left Back
71	Hungary	Zsolt Heiczinger	24 March 1988 (age 38)	Line Player

== Top scorers ==
Season	Player	Apps/Goals
2015–2016	(Hungary) Balázs Márton	24/118
2016–2017	(Hungary) Zsolt Szobol	24/127
2017–2018	(Hungary) Benedek Éles	25/108
2018–2019	(Hungary) Benedek Éles	19/86
2019–2020	Cancelled	
2020–2021	(Hungary) Gergő Fazekas	24/129
2021–2022	(Hungary) Benedek Éles	25/140
2022–2023	(Hungary) Benedek Éles	25/139

== Honours ==
Honours		No.	Years
League
Nemzeti Bajnokság I/B	Third Place	1	2015–16
Domestic Cups
Magyar Kupa	Runners-up	1	2021–22

== Recent seasons ==
- Seasons in Nemzeti Bajnokság I: 1
- Seasons in Nemzeti Bajnokság I/B: 5

Season	Division	Pos.	Magyar kupa
2013–14	NB II Északnyugat	4th	
2014–15	NB II Északnyugat	1th	
2015–16	NB I/B Nyugat	3th	Round 2
2016–17	NB I/B Nyugat	10th	Round 2
2017–18	NB I/B Nyugat	4th	Round 2
2018–19	NB I/B Nyugat	4th	Round 3
2019–20	NB I/B Nyugat	Cancelled	
2020–21	NB I	7th	Fourth place
2021–22	NB I	10th	Finalist

== European competition ==
Season	Competition	Round	Club	Home	Away	Aggregate
2022–23	EHF European League	Second qualifying round	(France) Chambéry Savoie Mont-Blanc HB	31–25	25–29	56–54
2022–23	EHF European League	Group stage (Group A)	(Portugal) SL Benfica	26–35	35–39	6th
2022–23	EHF European League	Group stage (Group A)	(Switzerland) Kadetten Schaffhausen	25–33	32–38	6th
2022–23	EHF European League	Group stage (Group A)	(Slovakia) Tatran Prešov	30–28	20–22	6th
2022–23	EHF European League	Group stage (Group A)	(Germany) Frisch Auf Göppingen	23–40	30–46	6th
2022–23	EHF European League	Group stage (Group A)	(France) Montpellier HB	31–39	30–34	6th

=== EHF ranking ===
As of 14/07/2022

Rank	Team	Points
164	(Estonia) Viljandi HC	21
165	(Switzerland) GC Amicitia Zürich	20
166	(Denmark) KIF Kolding	20
167	(Hungary) Fejér B.Á.L. Veszprém	20
168	(Finland) IFK Helsinki	19
169	(Switzerland) BSV Bern	19
170	(Poland) Grupa Azoty Unia Tarnów	19

== Former club members ==
=== Notable former players ===
- (Hungary) Ádám Borbély
- (Hungary) Benedek Éles
- (Hungary) Gergő Fazekas
- (Hungary) (Ukraine) Viktor Melnicsuk (2016–2018)
- (Hungary) Zsolt Szobol
- (Hungary) Attila Tóth
- (Hungary) Huba Vajda
- (Slovakia) Šimon Macháč (2022–)

=== Former coaches ===
Seasons	Coach	Country
2017–2018	Attila Vágó	(Hungary)
2018–2022	Csaba Tombor	(Hungary)
2022	József Éles	(Hungary)
2022–2023	Csaba Konkoly	(Hungary)
2023	József Éles	(Hungary)
2023–2024	Gábor Danyi	(Hungary)
2024–	Dinko Đanković	(Croatia)
