= Viktor Melnicsuk =

Ukrainian-Hungarian handball player (born 2001)

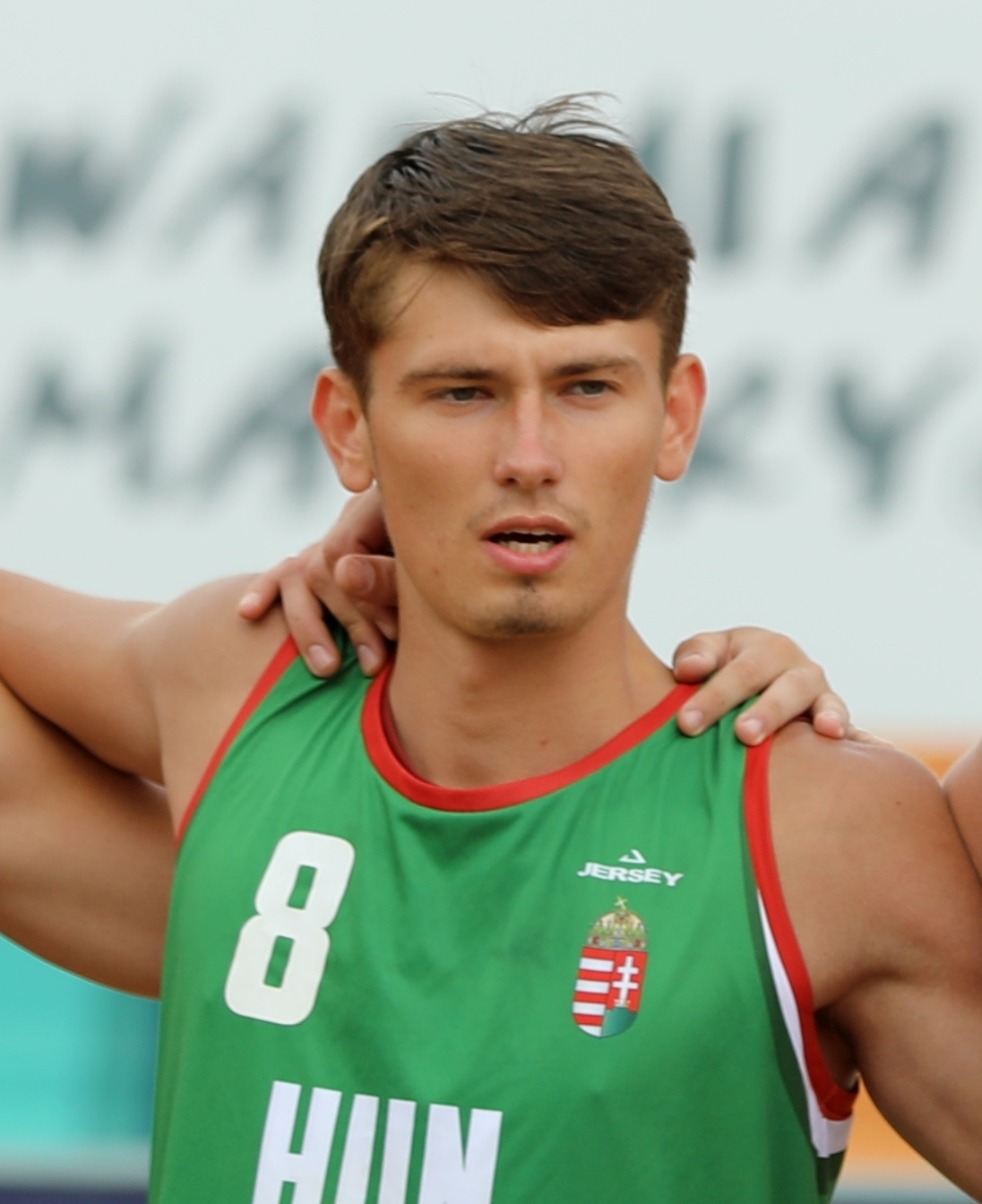
- Viktor Melnicsuk in 2019

Personal information
- Full name: Viktor Yuriy Melnicsuk
- Nationality: Ukrainian / Hungarian
- Born: 31 August 2001 (age 25) Dobrianychi, Ukraine
- Height: 1.88 m (6 ft 2 in)

Sport
- Sport: Handball
- Position: Central Back
- Current club: Budai Farkasok KKUK
- Number: 31

Youth career
- Years: Team
- 2009–2014: SC Pick Szeged
- 2014–2016: Éles KISE
- 2016–2017: Veszprém KKFT Felsőörs

Senior clubs
- Years: Team
- 2017–2018: (Hungary) Veszprém KKFT Felsőörs
- 2018–2020: (Hungary) Telekom Veszprém
- 2020–2022: (Ukraine) HC Motor Zaporizhzhia
- 2020–2022: → (Hungary) Sport36-Komló (loan)
- 2022–2024: (Hungary) Sport36-Komló
- 2024–2026: (Hungary) Balatonfüredi KSE
- 2025: → (Hungary) Carbonex-Komló (loan)
- 2026–: (Hungary) Budai Farkasok KKUK

Viktor Melnicsuk (Ukrainian: Віктор Мельничук, Hungarian: Melnyicsuk Viktor; born 31 August 2001) is a Ukrainian-Hungarian handball player for Budai Farkasok KKUK.

== Career ==
=== Club ===
Viktor Melnicsuk started playing handball in 2009 at SC Pick Szeged. In 2014, he transferred to Éles KISE. In 2016, he moved to the second division Veszprém KKFT Felsőörs. In the 2017/18 season, Viktor played for the first time in the second division in the Nemzeti Bajnokság I/B. In his first senior season, he scored 19 goals in 10 games. In 2018, he joined the best Hungarian team, Telekom Veszprém, where at first he mainly played in the Nemzeti Bajnokság I/B (Telekom Veszprém U20), but in his first season, he was able to make his debut in the Hungarian top flight for Telekom Veszprém: he scored 6 goals in 2 matches. He played 6 games in the top flight in the 2019/2020 season, when the league was interrupted due to the COVID pandemic. In 2020, he moved to his native country to the first division and reigning champion HC Motor Zaporizhzhia, which after 2 months loaned him to the Hungarian first division Sport36-Komló. In the summer of 2021, it was announced that Sport36-Komló had loaned Viktor for another 1 year. In 2022, Sport36-Komló permanently acquired Viktor from HC Motor Zaporizhzhia and signed a 2-year contract with him. When his contract expired in 2024, he transferred to the Balatonfüredi KSE team. In February 2025, it was announced that he would continue his career on loan with the Komló team at the request of his former club, Carbonex-Komló. He also started the 2025/2026 season at Carbonex-Komló, but after 5 matches, in which he scored 29 goals, Balatonfüredi KSE ordered him back to Balatonfüred due to the many injured players. In the summer of 2026, he signed with the Budai Farkasok KKUK team.

=== National team ===
He was 5th with the Hungarian team at the 2019 World Youth Championship. He was included in the large squad of the 2023 World Men's Handball Championship, but in the end he will not become a member of the narrow squad.

== Beach handball ==
In beach handball, Viktor became the Hungarian champion in 2016 and 2017 with the Orosháza Linamar Hír-Sat elite club, and won the Hungarian Cup in 2020. In beach handball, he also played in the youth, junior and adult national teams. In beach handball, he was chosen as the youth player of the year in 2016, and in 2019 he became the best male beach handball player of the year.

== Personal life ==
His father, Yuriy Melnichuk, was an excellent volleyball player, and he was the Hungarian champion with Medikémia Szeged in 1995 and 1996.
