= Benedek Éles =

Hungarian handball player (born 1999)

Personal information
- Nationality: Hungarian
- Born: 6 September 1999 (age 27) Veszprém, Hungary
- Height: 1.90 m (6 ft 3 in)

Sport
- Sport: Handball
- Position: Left Back
- Current club: MOL Tatabánya KC
- Number: 19

Youth career
- Years: Team
- 2013–2016: MKB-MVM Veszprém

Senior clubs
- Years: Team
- 2016–2023: (Hungary) Veszprém KKFT Felsőörs
- 2023–2024: (Germany) GWD Minden
- 2024–: (Hungary) MOL Tatabánya KC

Benedek Éles (born 6 September 1999) is a Hungarian handball player who plays for MOL Tatabánya KC.

== Career ==
=== Club ===
Benedek started his career in MKB-MVM Veszprém, the top Hungarian club. From there he transferred to Veszprém KKFT Felsőörs, another Veszprém team founded by his father, József Éles. With Veszprém KKFT Felsőörs, he was promoted to the Hungarian first-class championship in 2020. In 2022, the team reached the final of the Hungarian Cup, but were defeated there by Telekom Veszprém. Benedek scored 4 goals in the final. Thanks to the silver medal, they were able to start in the 2022–23 EHF European League. Benedek scored 63 goals in 10 matches in the EHF European League group stage. Thanks to this, the European Handball Federation (IHF) selected Benedek as the Top 3 best rookie of the EHF European League. In May 2023, the German GWD Minden announced that Benedek would join their team for 2 years from the summer. At the end of the season, GWD Minden was relegated from Handball-Bundesliga, so Benedek started the 2023/24 season in 2. Handball-Bundesliga. 2023 On November 24 against TV Großwallstadt, he suffered a serious knee injury and tore his cruciate ligament. Until his injury, he scored 40 goals in 2. Handball-Bundesliga in 13 league matches. He was able to return from his injury in the eighth round of the 2024/25 season, but did not get enough playing time, so he left the German team and transferred to the MOL Tatabánya KC team in November 2024. After 2017, the MOL Tatabánya KC team won bronze in the Hungarian Cup, Benedek did not score a goal in the bronze medal match. In 2026, the team reached the final of the Hungarian Cup, but were defeated there by ONE Veszprém. Benedek scored 5 goals in the final.

=== National team ===
As a member of the junior national team, he participated in the 2018 Junior European Championship where the Hungarian team became the 11th. He was included in the large squad of the 2022 European Men's Handball Championship, but in the end he will not become a member of the narrow squad.

== Personal life ==
His father, József Éles, is a former legendary national handball player who played in the Hungarian national handball team.

== Honours ==
=== Club ===
Veszprém KKFT Felsőörs

- Magyar Kupa
  - Silver: 2022

MOL Tatabánya KC

- EHF European Cup:
  - Silver: 2026
- Nemzeti Bajnokság I:
  - Bronze: 2026
- Magyar Kupa
  - Silver: 2026
  - Bronze: 2025
