= Gergő Fazekas =

Hungarian handball player (born 2003)

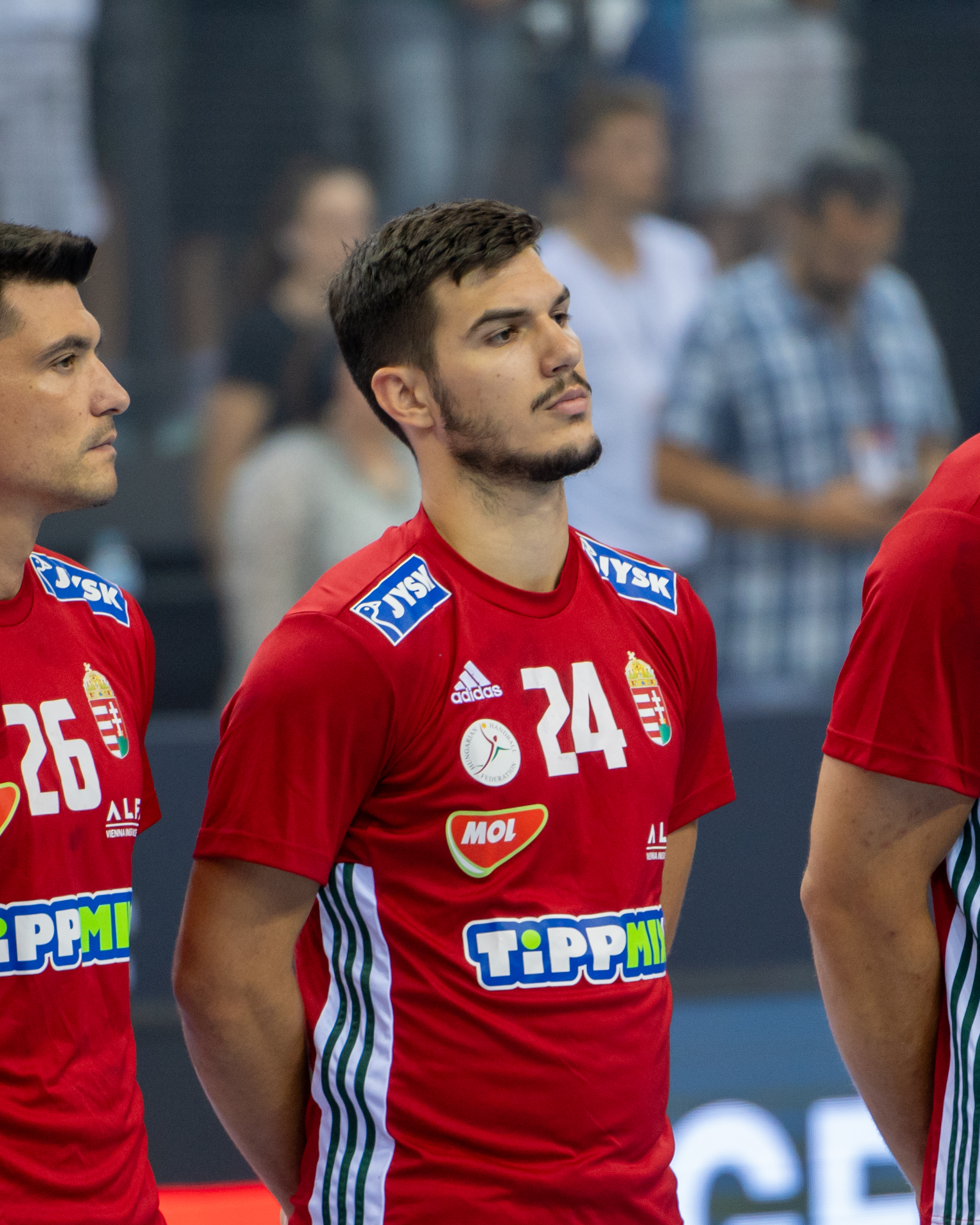
- Fazekas in 2024

Personal information
- Nationality: Hungarian
- Born: 31 October 2003 (age 23) Budapest, Hungary
- Height: 1.91 m (6 ft 3 in)

Sport
- Sport: Handball
- Position: Centre Back
- Current club: Wisła Płock
- Number: 24

Youth career
- Years: Team
- 2014–2018: Éles KISE

Senior clubs
- Years: Team
- 2018–2022: Veszprém KKFT Felsőörs
- 2022–11/2024: ONE Veszprém
- 2022–11/2024: → Wisła Płock (loan)
- 11/2024–: Wisła Płock
National team
Years	Team	Apps	(Gls)
2022–	Hungary	59	(122)
Medal record
Junior World Championship
Silver medal – second place	2023 Germany/Greece

Gergő Fazekas (born 31 October 2003) is a Hungarian handball player who plays for Wisła Płock and the Hungary national team.

== Career ==
=== Club ===
In the 2018/19 season, Gergő played for the first time in the second division in the Nemzeti Bajnokság I/B. He was not even 15 years old when he made his debut. In his first senior season, he scored 26 goals in 10 games. In 2020, when the league was interrupted due to the COVID-19 pandemic, Gergő was the second best scorer of his team leading the Nemzeti Bajnokság I/B with 77 goals in 15 matches. They were promoted to the top flight for the following season, where, as his team's top scorer, he scored 125 goals in 23 matches for the association that finished in seventh place in Nemzeti Bajnokság I. In addition, they finished fourth in the Hungarian Cup. In 2022, the team reached the final of the Hungarian Cup, but were defeated there by Telekom Veszprém.

In November 2021, it was announced that he would continue his career at Telekom Veszprém from the summer of 2022. They signed a 4-year contract with him. For the first two years of his contract, he is loaned to Polish side Wisła Płock. In Płock in the summer of 2022, during the preparation, he suffered a serious shoulder injury. He had surgery, then made his comeback in February 2023 after 6 months of rehabilitation. One of Gergő's most memorable matches of the 2023/24 season in the EHF Champions League is the group match against Telekom Veszprém, in which he scored seven goals from seven shots, taking a leading role in Wisła Płock's 37–30 victory.

In November 2024, Wisła Płock bought him from the Telekom Veszprém team and signed a contract with him until 2029.

=== National team ===
He was 9th with the Hungarian team at the 2021 Youth European Championship. He was called up to the Hungary national team for the first time in October 2021 by the then national team head coach István Gulyás. He was included in the large squad of the 2022 European Men's Handball Championship, but in the end he did not become a member of the narrow squad. On 19 March 2022, he made his international debut in the national team, (selected by Chema Rodríguez) in Gummersbach against Germany. He participated in the 2023 Junior World Championship, where Hungary won the silver medal.

He also participated in the 2024 European Men's Handball Championship as a member of the Hungary men's national handball team. (5th place, 8 matches / 18 goals). He also participated in the 2024 Paris Olympics, where the Hungarian team finished 10th (5 matches / 10 goals). He also participated in the 2025 World Men's Handball Championship as a member of the Hungary men's national handball team. (8th place, 7 matches / 14 goals). He also participated in the 2026 European Men's Handball Championship as a member of the Hungary men's national handball team. (10th place, 7 games / 23 goals).

== Personal life ==
His father, Nándor Fazekas, is a former handball player who played in the Hungary national team. His brother, Máté Fazekas, is also a professional handball player who plays as a left back.

== Honours ==
=== National team ===
- Junior World Championship:
  - Silver: 2023

=== Club ===
Veszprém KKFT Felsőörs

- Magyar Kupa
  - Silver: 2022

Wisła Płock

- Polish Superliga:
  - Gold: 2024, 2025
  - Silver: 2023, 2026
- Polish Cup
  - Gold: 2023, 2024, 2026
  - Silver: 2025
- Polish Supercup
  - Gold: 2024, 2026
  - Silver: 2025

=== Individual ===
- Hungarian Adolescent Handballer of the Year: 2019
- Hungarian Youth Handball Player of the Year: 2021
- Hungarian Handballer of the Year: 2025
