= Péter Tóth (handballer) =

Hungarian handball player (born 2000)

Personal information
- Nationality: Hungarian
- Born: 28 June 2000 (age 26) Békéscsaba, Hungary
- Height: 1.83 m (6 ft 0 in)

Sport
- Sport: Handball
- Position: Right Back/Right Wing
- Current club: Ferencvárosi TC
- Number: 2

Youth career
- Years: Team
- 2011–2015: Békési FKC
- 2015–2016: Békéscsabai DKSE
- 2016–2017: NEKA

Senior clubs
- Years: Team
- 2017–2021: (Hungary) NEKA
- 2020–2021: → (Hungary) Veszprém KKFT Felsőörs (loan)
- 2021–2023: (Hungary) Fejér B.Á.L. Veszprém
- 2023–2025: (Hungary) Csurgói KK
- 2025–: (Hungary) Ferencvárosi TC
National team
Years	Team	Apps	(Gls)
2025–	Hungary	3	(4)

Péter Tóth (born 28 June 2000 ) is a Hungarian handball player who plays for Ferencvárosi TC.

== Career ==
=== Club ===
Péter started his career in Békési FKC. In 2015, he transferred to Békéscsabai DKSE. Péter moved from Békéscsaba to Balatonboglár, the National Handball Academy (NEKA) in 2016. He made his debut in the first team in NEKA in 2017, and in that season he scored 69 goals in 26 matches in the then still Nemzeti Bajnokság I/B team. He was loaned to first division team Veszprém KKFT Felsőörs for the 2020/21 season. In his first Nemzeti Bajnokság I season, he scored 24 goals in 20 games. After the loan, he permanently joined the Veszprém KKFT Felsőörs team the following year. In 2022, the team reached the final of the Hungarian Cup, but were defeated there by Telekom Veszprém. Thanks to the silver medal, they were able to start in the 2022–23 EHF European League. Péter scored 12 goals in 6 matches in the EHF European League. In the summer of 2023, he joined Csurgói KK. In the summer of 2025, he transferred to the Ferencvárosi TC team starting in the EHF European League.

=== National team ===
He was 10th with the Hungarian team at the 2018 Youth European Championship. As a member of the junior national team, he participated in the 2019 Junior World Championship where the Hungarian team became the 15th. He was included in the large squad of the 2022 European Men's Handball Championship, but in the end he did not become a member of the narrow squad. The captain of the Hungarian national team, Chema Rodríguez, also noticed his performance, who invited him to practice with the national team from September 30 to October 4, 2024. He was included in the large squad of the 2025 World Men's Handball Championship, but in the end he will not become a member of the narrow squad. He made his debut for the Hungarian men's adult national team on March 12, 2025, in Podgorica, in a European Championship qualifying match against Montenegro, where the Hungarian national team defeated the Montenegro national team 29–26. He was included in the large squad of the 2026 European Men's Handball Championship, but in the end he will not become a member of the narrow squad.

== Honours ==
=== Club ===
Fejér B.Á.L. Veszprém

- Magyar Kupa
  - Silver: 2022
