= Komlói Bányász SK (men's handball) =

Hungarian handball club

Carbonex-Komló
- Nickname: Bányász
- Short name: KBSK
- Founded: 1952; 74 years ago
- Arena: Komló Városi Sportközpont, Komló
- Capacity: 800 seats
- President: Szabolcs Szigeti
- Head coach: Dávid Péter Szabó
- League: Nemzeti Bajnokság I
- 2021–22: Nemzeti Bajnokság I, 7th of 14
- Club colours
Home	Away

Komlói Bányász Sport Klub (handball section) is a Hungarian handball club from Komló, that plays in the Nemzeti Bajnokság I, the top level championship in Hungary.

Location of Carbonex-Komló

== Crest, colours, supporters ==
=== Naming history ===
Name	Period
Komlói Bányász	−1994
Komlói Bányász SK	1994–1995
Metraco-Komlói Bányász SK	1995–1996
Komlói Bányász SK	1996–2002
Komlói BSK-Fűtőerőmű	2002–2007
Komlói Bányász SK	2007–2009
Komlói BSK-Tom Trans	2009–2013
Komlói Sport KC	2013–2014
Sport36-Komló	2014–2023
Carbonex-Komló	2023–present

=== Kit manufacturers ===
Period	Kit manufacturer
–2013	(Germany) Jako
2013–2015	(Germany) Saller
2015–2023	(Italy) Zeus
2023–present	(Germany) Jako

=== Kits ===
HOME
2014–15	Zeus; 2021–23	2023–

AWAY
2013–14	Zeus; 2014–15	Zeus; 2021–2023	2023–

THIRD

2023–

== Sports Hall information ==
- Name: – Komló Városi Sportközpont
- City: – Komló
- Capacity: – 800
- Address: – 7300 Komló, Eszperantó tér 1.

== Management ==
Position	Name
President	(Hungary) Szabolcs Szigeti
Executive Director	(Hungary) Balázs Szögi
Club Director	(Hungary) Dávid Katzirz
Department Head	(Hungary) Zoltán Keszthelyi

== Team ==
=== Current squad ===
Squad for the 2026–27 season

Carbonex-Komló

Goalkeepers

- (Hungary) Benjámin Szilágyi
- (Hungary) Kornél Matos
- (Hungary) Máté Nagy

Left Wingers

- 3 (Hungary) Bálint Ág

Right Wingers

- 13 (Hungary) Szabolcs Varga

Line Players

- 9 (Hungary) Olivér Szöllősi (c)

Central Backs

- 19 (Hungary) Gergő Gulyás
- 26 (Hungary) Péter Ács
- (Hungary) Márk Begovácz

Left Backs

- 17 (Hungary) Balázs Pataki
- (Hungary) Gergely Szabó
- (Hungary) Péter Határ

Right Backs

=== Technical staff ===
- Head coach: (Hungary) Dávid Péter Szabó
- Goalkeeping coach: (Hungary) Attila Selymes
- Fitness coach: (Hungary) Ádám Bujtár
- Masseur: (Hungary) Norbert Somlai

=== Transfers ===
Transfers for the 2026–27 season

Joining

- (Hungary) Gergely Szabó (LB) from (Hungary) Pécsi EAC
- (Hungary) Kornél Matos (GK) from (Hungary) Pécsi EAC
- (Hungary) Máté Nagy (GK) from (Hungary) Pécsi EAC
- (Hungary) Benjámin Szilágyi (GK) from (Hungary) Mezőkövesdi KC
- (Hungary) Márk Begovácz (CB) from (Hungary) Siklós KC
- (Hungary) Péter Határ (LB) from (Hungary) Rákosmenti KSK

Leaving

- (Algeria) Abdeldjalil Zennadi (LP) to (Greece) AEK Athens
- (Hungary) (Croatia) Srećko Jerković (LB) to (Croatia) RK Metković
- (Hungary) Tamás Borsos (LB) to (Hungary) PLER-Budapest
- (Hungary) Áron Ágoston (GK) (retires)
- (Hungary) Máté Menyhárt (LW) to (Hungary) PLER-Budapest
- (Hungary) Milán Váczi (CB) to (Hungary) Szigetszentmiklósi KSK
- (Hungary) Norbert Balogh (RB) to (Hungary) Dabas KK
- (Hungary) Péter Marcsek (LP) to (Hungary) Salgótarjáni SKC
- (Montenegro) Darko Pejović (LP)
- (Ukraine) Maksym Viunik (GK)
- (Serbia) Nikola Kovačević (LB)
- (Hungary) Egon Urbán (RW)
- (Hungary) Márk Pauló (RB)

Transfers for the 2025–26 season

Joining

- (Ukraine) Vladyslav Dontsov (RB) from (Poland) MKS Kalisz
- (Ukraine) Maksym Viunik (GK) from (Spain) BM Villa de Aranda
- (Algeria) Abdeldjalil Zennadi (LP) from (Hungary) QHB-Eger
- (Hungary) Olivér Szöllősi (LP) from (Hungary) QHB-Eger
- (Hungary) Áron Ágoston (GK) from (Hungary) QHB-Eger
- (Hungary) Bálint Ág (LW) from (Hungary) Dabas KK
- (Hungary) Péter Marcsek (LP) from (Hungary) MOL Tatabánya KC
- (Montenegro) Darko Pejović (LP) from (Bosnia and Herzegovina) RK Borac Banja Luka
- (Serbia) Nikola Kovačević (LB) from (Serbia) RK Metaloplastika

Leaving

- (Croatia) Matko Rotim (LP) to (Hungary) Csurgói KK
- (United States) (Hungary) Pál Merkovszki (GK) to (Germany) OHV Aurich
- (Hungary) Levente Szrnka (LP) to (Hungary) Győri ETO-UNI FKC
- (Slovenia) Tim Jenko Bogdanić (RB) to (Slovakia) HT Tatran Prešov
- (Iran) Mohammad Siavoshi (GK)
- (Serbia) Radovan Ostojić (CB)
- (Hungary) (Ukraine) Viktor Melnicsuk (CB) loan back to (Hungary) Balatonfüredi KSE
- (Ukraine) Vladyslav Dontsov (RB)

Transfers for the 2024–25 season

Joining

- (Iran) Mohammad Siavoshi (GK) from (Romania) CS Universitatea Cluj-Napoca
- (Serbia) Radovan Ostojić (CB) from (Serbia) RK Dinamo Pančevo
- (Hungary) Tamás Borsos (LB) from (Hungary) Csurgói KK
- (Hungary) Levente Szrnka (LP) from (Hungary) Fejér B.Á.L. Veszprém
- (Hungary) (Ukraine) Viktor Melnicsuk (CB) on loan from (Hungary) Balatonfüredi KSE
- (Hungary) Norbert Balogh (RB) from (Hungary) Fejér B.Á.L. Veszprém

Leaving

- (Hungary) (Ukraine) Viktor Melnicsuk (CB) to (Hungary) Balatonfüredi KSE
- (Croatia) Ante Granić (GK) to (Croatia) RK Metković
- (Hungary) Barnabás Orbán (LW) to (Hungary) KK Ajka
- (Hungary) Olivér Szöllősi (LP) to (Hungary) QHB-Eger
- (Hungary) Viktor Bazsa (LB) to (Hungary) Ózdi KC
- (Hungary) Gábor Tóth (RW) to (Hungary) Ózdi KC
- (Hungary) Márk Begovácz (CB) to (Hungary) Pécsi EAC
- (Hungary) József Hoffmann (LW)
- (Serbia) Aleksa Veselinović (CB)
- (Croatia) Josip Vekić (RB)
- (Hungary) Dominik Kovács (LP)

Transfers for the 2023–24 season

Joining

- (Serbia) Aleksa Veselinović (CB) from (Hungary) Pécsi VSE
- (Slovenia) Tim Jenko Bogdanić (RB) from (Czech Republic) HK Lovosice
- (Croatia) Matko Rotim (LP) from (Hungary) Csurgói KK
- (United States) (Hungary) Pál Merkovszki (GK) from (Hungary) Budai Farkasok KKUK
- (Hungary) Máté Menyhárt (LW) from (Hungary) HE-DO B. Braun Gyöngyös
- (Hungary) Milán Váczi (CB) from (Hungary) Szigetszentmiklósi KSK
- (Hungary) Péter Ács (CB) from (Hungary) PLER-Budapest

Leaving

- (Bosnia and Herzegovina) Tarik Vranac (LB) to (Italy) Handball Sassari
- (Croatia) Bruno-Vili Zobec (RB) to (Hungary) PLER-Budapest
- (Hungary) (Serbia) Filip Sunajko (CB) to (Hungary) PLER-Budapest
- (Hungary) Bence Takács (CB) to (Hungary) Győri ETO-UNI FKC
- (Hungary) Imre Pásztor (GK) to (Hungary) Győri ETO-UNI FKC
- (Hungary) Dániel Csányi (LP) to (Hungary) NEKA
- (Hungary) Lev Szuharev (RB) to (Hungary) Fejér B.Á.L. Veszprém
- (Hungary) Péter Grünfelder (LP) to (Hungary) Fejér B.Á.L. Veszprém
- (Hungary) Péter Vaskó (RW)
- (Hungary) Benjámin Szilágyi (GK) to (Hungary) Mezőkövesdi KC

Transfers for the 2022–23 season

Joining

- (Hungary) Viktor Melnicsuk (CB) from (Ukraine) Motor Zaporizhzhia
- (Hungary) Lev Szuharev (RB) from (Hungary) SBS-Eger
- (Hungary) Dániel Csányi (LP) from (Hungary) BFKA-Veszprém
- (Croatia) Josip Vekić (RB) from (Iceland) Þór Akureyri

Leaving

- (Croatia) Tomislav Radic (RB) to (Romania) CSM Oradea
- (Hungary) Norbert Jóga (LP) to (Hungary) Gyöngyösi KK
- (Hungary) Szabolcs Szkokán (RW) to (Hungary) Szigetszentmiklósi KSK

Transfers for the 2021–22 season

Joining

- (Hungary) Imre Pásztor (GK) from (Hungary) Mezőkövesdi KC
- (Hungary) Olivér Szöllősi (LP) from (Hungary) Mezőkövesdi KC
- (Hungary) Barnabás Orbán (LW) from (Hungary) Pécsi EAC
- (Bosnia and Herzegovina) Tarik Vranac (LB) from (Hungary) Ceglédi KKSE
- (Hungary) Egon Urbán (RW) from (Hungary) Gyöngyösi KK
- (Croatia) Tomislav Radic (RB) from (Croatia) MRK Umag

Leaving

- (Hungary) Sándor Balázs (LB) to (Hungary) Debreceni EAC
- (Hungary) Tamás Oláh (RB) to (Hungary) Budai Farkasok KKUK
- (Hungary) Sándor Dobi (LP) to (Hungary) Mezőkövesdi KC
- (Hungary) Tamás Csomor (LW) to (Hungary) Ceglédi KKSE
- (Serbia) Aleksandar Djurdjevic (GK)

Transfers for the 2020–21 season

Joining

- (Hungary) József Hoffmann (LW) from (Hungary) Pécsi EAC
- (Hungary) Viktor Melnicsuk (CB) on loan from (Ukraine) Motor Zaporizhzhia

Leaving

- (Hungary) Dávid Katzirz (LB) (retires)
- (Hungary) (Serbia) Sztefán Manojlovity (CB)
- (Hungary) Dániel Gajdos (LP) to (Hungary) Tatai AC
- (Hungary) Attila Selymes (GK) to (Hungary) Holler UFC
- (Montenegro) Igor Marković (LW) to (Montenegro) RK Lovćen

Transfers for the 2019–20 season

Joining

- (Hungary) Bence Takács (CB) from (Hungary) SBS-Eger
- (Hungary) Péter Vaskó (RW) from (Hungary) SBS-Eger
- (Croatia) Bruno-Vili Zobec (RB) from (Hungary) Ceglédi KKSE
- (Hungary) Tamás Oláh (RB) from (Hungary) Ferencvárosi TC
- (Hungary) Norbert Jóga (LP) from (Hungary) Mezőkövesdi KC
- (Hungary) Tamás Csomor (LW) from (Hungary) NEKA
- (Hungary) Sándor Dobi (LP) from (Hungary) NEKA

Leaving

- (Bosnia and Herzegovina) Branislav Obradović (RB) (retires)
- (Montenegro) Bogdan Petričević (CB) to (Italy) SC Meran
- (Hungary) Ádám Gebhardt (RW) to (Hungary) Csurgói KK
- (Hungary) Márk Kovács (LP) to (Slovenia) MRD Dobova
- (Hungary) József Hoffmann (LW) to (Hungary) Pécsi EAC
- (Hungary) Tamás Wéber (LW) to (Hungary) Pécsi EAC
- (Hungary) Gábor Marcsek (LP) to (Hungary) Pécsi VSE
- (Hungary) Martin Szabó (GK) to (Hungary) Kecskeméti TE

Transfers for the 2018–19 season

Joining

- (Croatia) Ivan Matić (LB) from (Croatia) HRK Gorica
- (Hungary) Ádám Pál (RB) from (Germany) HSC Bad Neustadt
- (Hungary) (Serbia) Sztefán Manojlovity (CB) from (Hungary) Csurgói KK
- (Serbia) Aleksandar Djurdjevic (GK) from (Hungary) Telekom Veszprém
- (Montenegro) Bogdan Petričević (CB) from (France) JS Cherbourg

Leaving

- (Germany) Joel Huesmann (LB) to (Switzerland) TV Endingen
- (Hungary) Balázs Szögi (CB) to (Hungary) Pécsi EAC
- (Hungary) Gábor Laufer (CB) to (Hungary) Pécsi EAC
- (Hungary) Ádám Pál (RB) to (Hungary) Tungsram SE Nagykanizsa
- (Croatia) Ivan Matić (LB) to (Croatia) GRK Varaždin

Transfers for the 2017–18 season

Joining

- (Hungary) Sándor Balázs (LB) from (Hungary) Balmazújvárosi KK
- (Hungary) Péter Grünfelder (LP) from (Hungary) Mezőkövesdi KC
- (Hungary) Martin Szabó (GK) from (Hungary) NEKA
- (Germany) Joel Huesmann (LB) from (Netherlands) HV Hurry-Up

Leaving

- (Hungary) Bence Szöllősi (LB) (retires)
- (Hungary) Ádám Bujtár (RW) to (Hungary) PLER KC
- (Hungary) Ákos Pethő (LB) to (Hungary) Balmazújvárosi KK
- (Hungary) Zoltán Nagy (LP) to (Hungary) Pécsi EAC
- (Hungary) Szabolcs Kékesi (RB) to (Hungary) Pécsi EAC
- (Croatia) Antonio Pribanić (LP) to (Romania) SCM Politehnica Timișoara

Transfers for the 2016–17 season

Joining

- (Hungary) Ádám Gebhardt (RW) from (Hungary) Csurgói KK
- (Croatia) Josip Pazin (RB) from (Hungary) Csurgói KK
- (Hungary) Ádám Bujtár (RW) from (Hungary) Ferencvárosi TC
- (Hungary) Szabolcs Kékesi (RB) from (Luxembourg) Handball Käerjeng
- (Hungary) Balázs Márton (LB) from (Hungary) Veszprémi KSE
- (Bosnia and Herzegovina) Branislav Obradović (RB) from (Bosnia and Herzegovina) RK Borac Banja Luka
- (Hungary) Dávid Katzirz (LB) from (Hungary) Balmazújvárosi KK
- (Croatia) Antonio Pribanić (LP) from (Poland) KPR Legionowo
- (Hungary) Szabolcs Szkokán (RW) from (Hungary) Csurgói KK
- (Hungary) Márk Kovács (LP) from (Hungary) NEKA

Leaving

- (Egypt) Mohammad Sanad (RW) to (Spain) BM Logroño La Rioja
- (Ukraine) Alexander Semikov (RB) to (Hungary) Budakalász FKC
- (Belarus) Stanislav Nakhaenko (LP)
- (Serbia) Nikola Potić (RB) to (Spain) CB Cangas
- (Hungary) Dániel Hidasi (CB) to (Hungary) Pécsi VSE
- (Croatia) Josip Pazin (RB) to (Hungary) Csurgói KK
- (Bosnia and Herzegovina) Goran Trkulja (LP) to (Serbia) RK Vojvodina
- (Hungary) Balázs Márton (LB) to (Hungary) Veszprémi KSE
- (Hungary) Csaba Sebestyén (LB) to (Hungary) Békési FKC
- (Hungary) Márk Kovács (LP) on loan at (Hungary) Szigetszentmiklósi KSK

Transfers for the 2015–16 season

Joining

- (Montenegro) Igor Marković (LW) from (Montenegro) RK Lovćen
- (Egypt) Mohammad Sanad (RW) from (Egypt) Zamalek SC
- (Croatia) Srećko Jerković (LB) from (Croatia) RK Poreč
- (Croatia) Martino Kordić (RB) from (Italy) Sinergia Handball Sassari
- (Hungary) (Serbia) Filip Sunajko (CB) from (Serbia) RK Grafičar
- (Belarus) Stanislav Nakhaenko (LP) from (Hungary) Mezőkövesdi KC
- (Hungary) Ákos Pethő (LB) from (Hungary) Balatonfüredi KSE
- (Ukraine) Alexander Semikov (RB) from (Hungary) Gyöngyösi KK
- (Serbia) Nikola Potić (RB) from (Spain) BM Puente Genil
- (Bosnia and Herzegovina) Goran Trkulja (LP) from (Serbia) RK Vojvodina

Leaving

- (Bosnia and Herzegovina) Gafar Hadžiomerović (LP) to (Hungary) Csurgói KK
- (Ukraine) Alexander Semikov (RB) to (Hungary) Gyöngyösi KK
- (Serbia) Savo Mešter (CB) to (Hungary) Gyöngyösi KK
- (Hungary) Attila Kun (LB) to (Hungary) Ceglédi KKSE
- (Serbia) Bojan Rađenović (LW) loan back to (Hungary) Csurgói KK
- (Hungary) Ádám Bujtár (RW) loan back to (Hungary) Balatonfüredi KSE
- (Croatia) Martino Kordić (RB) to (Bosnia and Herzegovina) RK Bosna Sarajevo

Transfers for the 2014–15 season

Joining

- (Croatia) Ante Granić (GK) from (Bosnia and Herzegovina) HMRK Zrinjski Mostar
- (Bosnia and Herzegovina) Gafar Hadžiomerović (LP) from (Bosnia and Herzegovina) RK Konjuh Živinice
- (Bosnia and Herzegovina) Emir Rahimić (RB) from (Iran) Samen Al-hojaj
- (Hungary) Ádám Bajorhegyi (LB) from (Hungary) Váci KSE
- (Hungary) Attila Kun (LB) from (Hungary) MOL-Pick Szeged
- (Hungary) Csaba Sebestyén (LB) from (Hungary) Pécsi VSE
- (Ukraine) Alexander Semikov (RB) from (Ukraine) Motor Zaporizhzhia
- (Serbia) Savo Mešter (CB) from (Denmark) TMS Ringsted
- (Serbia) Bojan Rađenović (LW) on loan from (Hungary) Csurgói KK
- (Hungary) Ádám Bujtár (RW) on loan from (Hungary) Balatonfüredi KSE

Leaving

- (Hungary) Gergely Szappanos (CB) (retires)
- (Hungary) Gergő Chalupa (LW) to (Hungary) Mecseknádasdi Spartacus SE
- (Hungary) Dávid Dénes (LW) to (Hungary) Mecseknádasdi Spartacus SE
- (Hungary) Tamás Fata (GK) to (Hungary) Szigetvári KSE
- (Hungary) János Liptai (LP) to (Hungary) Pécsi VSE
- (Hungary) Kornél Vajda (RB) to (Hungary) Pécsi VSE
- (Hungary) Péter Gász (CB)
- (Hungary) Ádám Bajorhegyi (LB) to (Germany) HC Elbflorenz Dresden
- (Bosnia and Herzegovina) Emir Rahimić (RB) to (Israel) Maccabi Rehovot
- (Hungary) Péter Győri (RW) to (Hungary) Pécsi VSE

== Previous squads ==
2018–2019 Team
Shirt No	Nationality	Player	Birth Date	Position
1	Croatia	Ante Granić	15 May 1988 (age 38)	Goalkeeper
3	Hungary	Dávid Katzirz	25 June 1980 (age 46)	Left Back
4	Hungary	József Hoffmann	4 September 1996 (age 30)	Left Winger
5	Montenegro	Bogdan Petričević	6 September 1989 (age 37)	Central Back
6	HungarySerbia	Sztefán Manojlovity	22 December 1997 (age 28)	Central Back
7	Hungary	Ádám Pál	7 August 1995 (age 31)	Right Back
8	Hungary	Gábor Marcsek	23 April 1994 (age 32)	Line Player
9	Hungary	Márk Kovács	1 July 1997 (age 29)	Line Player
11	Montenegro	Igor Marković	16 December 1981 (age 44)	Left Winger
12	Serbia	Aleksandar Djurdjevic	20 July 1997 (age 29)	Goalkeeper
15	Hungary	Sándor Balázs	9 July 1991 (age 35)	Left Back
16	Hungary	Attila Selymes	28 February 1988 (age 38)	Goalkeeper
17	HungarySerbia	Filip Sunajko	10 August 1995 (age 31)	Central Back
20	CroatiaHungary	Srećko Jerković	29 February 1992 (age 34)	Left Back
23	Hungary	Tamás Wéber	28 May 1989 (age 37)	Left Winger
24	Hungary	Szabolcs Szkokán	15 April 1995 (age 31)	Right Winger
25	Hungary	Ádám Gebhardt	25 October 1988 (age 38)	Right Winger
27	Hungary	Péter Grünfelder	27 January 1991 (age 35)	Line Player
34	Bosnia and Herzegovina	Branislav Obradović	3 September 1979 (age 47)	Right Back
87	Croatia	Ivan Matić	17 April 1996 (age 30)	Left Back
99	Hungary	Martin Szabó	2 September 1997 (age 29)	Goalkeeper

2015–2016 Team
Shirt No	Nationality	Player	Birth Date	Position
1	Croatia	Ante Granić	15 May 1988 (age 38)	Goalkeeper
4	Hungary	József Hoffmann	4 September 1996 (age 30)	Left Winger
5	Hungary	Dániel Hidasi	13 March 1993 (age 33)	Left Back
6	Bosnia and Herzegovina	Goran Trkulja	22 August 1985 (age 41)	Line Player
7	Hungary	Balázs Szögi	22 December 1978 (age 47)	Central Back
8	Hungary	Gábor Marcsek	23 April 1994 (age 32)	Line Player
9	Hungary	Gábor Laufer	11 August 1995 (age 31)	Central Back
10	Montenegro	Igor Marković	16 December 1981 (age 44)	Left Winger
12	Hungary	Balázs Kiss	23 August 1993 (age 33)	Goalkeeper
13	Hungary	Dávid Péter Szabó	13 January 1984 (age 42)	Left Winger
14	Hungary	Bence Szöllősi	13 April 1986 (age 40)	Left Back
15	Croatia	Martino Kordić	1 February 1991 (age 35)	Right Back
16	Hungary	Attila Selymes	28 February 1988 (age 38)	Goalkeeper
17	HungarySerbia	Filip Sunajko	10 August 1995 (age 31)	Central Back
18	Hungary	Zoltán Nagy	31 January 1983 (age 43)	Line Player
19	Belarus	Stanislav Nakhaenko	20 April 1993 (age 33)	Line Player
20	Croatia	Srećko Jerković	29 February 1992 (age 34)	Left Back
21	Hungary	Csaba Sebestyén	2 June 1993 (age 33)	Left Back
22	Hungary	Péter Oszlár	2 September 1988 (age 38)	Right Winger
23	Hungary	Tamás Wéber	28 May 1989 (age 37)	Left Winger
25	Ukraine	Alexander Semikov	9 July 1985 (age 41)	Right Back
44	Hungary	Ákos Pethő	9 June 1995 (age 31)	Left Back
55	Serbia	Nikola Potić	7 January 1994 (age 32)	Right Back
91	Egypt	Mohammad Sanad	16 January 1991 (age 35)	Right Winger

2014–2015 Team
Shirt No	Nationality	Player	Birth Date	Position
1	Croatia	Ante Granić	15 May 1988 (age 38)	Goalkeeper
2	Serbia	Bojan Rađenović	4 September 1994 (age 32)	Left Winger
5	Hungary	Dániel Hidasi	13 March 1993 (age 33)	Left Back
6	Hungary	Péter Győri	28 April 1988 (age 38)	Right Winger
7	Hungary	Balázs Szögi	22 December 1978 (age 47)	Central Back
8	Hungary	Ádám Bajorhegyi	17 November 1980 (age 45)	Left Back
9	Hungary	Gábor Laufer	11 August 1995 (age 31)	Central Back
10	Hungary	Attila Kun	12 May 1994 (age 32)	Left Back
12	Hungary	Balázs Kiss	23 August 1993 (age 33)	Goalkeeper
13	Hungary	Dávid Péter Szabó	13 January 1984 (age 42)	Left Winger
14	Hungary	Bence Szöllősi	13 April 1986 (age 40)	Left Back
16	Hungary	Attila Selymes	28 February 1988 (age 38)	Goalkeeper
17	Hungary	Gábor Marcsek	23 April 1994 (age 32)	Line Player
18	Hungary	Zoltán Nagy	31 January 1983 (age 43)	Line Player
19	Bosnia and Herzegovina	Emir Rahimić	24 April 1987 (age 39)	Right Back
21	Hungary	Csaba Sebestyén	2 June 1993 (age 33)	Left Back
22	Hungary	Péter Oszlár	2 September 1988 (age 38)	Right Winger
23	Hungary	Tamás Wéber	28 May 1989 (age 37)	Left Winger
25	Ukraine	Alexander Semikov	9 July 1985 (age 41)	Right Back
26	Serbia	Savo Mešter	2 March 1990 (age 36)	Central Back
45	Bosnia and Herzegovina	Gafar Hadžiomerović	13 February 1990 (age 36)	Line Player
77	Hungary	Ádám Bujtár	5 March 1993 (age 33)	Right Winger

2008–2009 Team
Shirt No	Nationality	Player	Birth Date	Position
1	Hungary	Zoltán Pókos	20 April 1974 (age 52)	Goalkeeper
2	Hungary	Ádám Bakos	4 August 1986 (age 40)	Right Winger
3	Hungary	Tamás Németh	17 February 1977 (age 49)	Left Back
4	Hungary	Zoltán Kaplonyi	17 February 1977 (age 49)	Left Back
5	Hungary	Nándor Debreceni	12 October 1986 (age 40)	Line Player
6	Hungary	Tibor Dömös	15 July 1981 (age 45)	Left Back
7	Hungary	Gábor Ujváry	27 September 1987 (age 39)	Left Winger
8	Hungary	Ádám Kiss	16 October 1988 (age 38)	Central Back
9	Hungary	Norbert Sutka	11 January 1985 (age 41)	Left Back
10	Hungary	Zoltán Molnár	23 December 1971 (age 54)	Line Player
11	Hungary	Gergely Szappanos	1 November 1980 (age 46)	Central Back
12	Hungary	Tamás Szabó	3 March 1982 (age 44)	Goalkeeper
13	Hungary	Dávid Péter Szabó	13 January 1984 (age 42)	Left Winger
14	Hungary	Péter Oszlár	2 September 1988 (age 38)	Right Winger
15	Hungary	Dániel Varga	13 March 1988 (age 38)	Right Back
16	Hungary	Csaba Mészáros	14 January 1968 (age 58)	Goalkeeper
17	Hungary	Bálint Kilvinger	17 April 1984 (age 42)	Right Back
18	Hungary	Zoltán Nagy	31 January 1983 (age 43)	Line Player

== Top scorers ==
Season	Player	Apps/Goals
2005–2006	(Hungary) Norbert Sutka	30/186
2006–2007	(Hungary) Tibor Cifra	31/155
2007–2008	(Hungary) Tibor Cifra	28/114
2008–2009	(Hungary) Tibor Dömös	24/143
2009–2010	(Hungary) Bálint Kilvinger	26/212
2010–2011	(Hungary) Róbert Paic	24/148
2011–2012	(Hungary) Bálint Kilvinger	23/137
2012–2013	(Hungary) Dávid Péter Szabó	23/119
2013–2014	(Hungary) Bence Szöllősi	24/143
2014–2015	(Ukraine) Alexander Semikov	17/130
2015–2016	(Montenegro) Igor Marković	37/169
2016–2017	(Hungary) (Croatia) Srećko Jerković	24/117
2017–2018	(Hungary) (Croatia) Srećko Jerković	24/120
2018–2019	(Montenegro) Igor Marković	25/161
2019–2020	Cancelled	
2020–2021	(Croatia) Bruno-Vili Zobec	26/100
2021–2022	(Hungary) (Croatia) Srećko Jerković	26/115
2022–2023	(Hungary) (Ukraine) Viktor Melnicsuk	23/138
2023–2024	(Hungary) Milán Váczi	25/110
2024–2025	(Hungary) (Croatia) Srećko Jerković	26/119

== All Stars Team 1952–2022 ==
In 2022, the Komló sports club celebrated its 100th anniversary, including the handball club. Here is the Komló team made up of the best of the last 100 years:

- Goalkeeper: (Ukraine) Vasily Shevtsov (1990–1999)
- Right Winger: (Hungary) Attila Kalocsay (1996–2000)
- Right Back: (Hungary) Zoltán Németh (1991–1999)
- Centre Back: (Hungary) László Papp (1985–2003)
- Left Back: (Hungary) Zoltán Keszthelyi (1982–2002)
- Left Winger: (Montenegro) Igor Marković (2015–2020)
- Pivot: (Russia) Serguei Tolstykh (1992–2003)
- Best Defender: (Hungary) Dávid Katzirz (2016–2020)
- Best Coach: (Hungary) László Skaliczki (1992–1995)

Coach: (Hungary) László Skaliczki

== Honours ==
Honours	No.	Years
League
Nemzeti Bajnokság I/B Winners	3	1989–90, 1999–00, 2004–2005
Nemzeti Bajnokság I/B Runners-up	2	1971, 2013–14
Nemzeti Bajnokság I/B Third place	1	1982
Domestic Cups
Magyar Kupa Third place	1	2005–06
Best European Results
EHF Cup Winners' Cup Second Round	1	2006–07
EHF Cup Second qualifying round	1	2018–19
EHF City Cup Round of 32	1	1994–95

=== Individual awards ===
==== Domestic ====
Nemzeti Bajnokság I Top Scorer

Season	Name	Goals
1991–92	(Hungary) Zoltán Keszthelyi	182

== Seasons ==
=== Season to season ===
As of 8 July 2025

- Seasons in Nemzeti Bajnokság I: 28
- Seasons in Nemzeti Bajnokság I/B: 28
- Seasons in Nemzeti Bajnokság II: 12

Season	Tier	Division	Place	Magyar Kupa
1957	2	NB II Dél	1st	
1958	1	NB I	13th	Did not held
1959	2	NB II	8th	Did not held
1960	2	NB II Nyugat	8th	Did not held
1961	2	NB II Nyugat	5th	Did not held
1962	2	NB II Nyugat	9th	Did not held
1963	2	NB II Nyugat	8th	

Season	Tier	Division	Place	Magyar Kupa
1964	2	NB II Nyugat	8th	
1965	2	NB II Nyugat	7th	
1966	2	NB II Nyugat	8th	
1967	2	NB II Nyugat	8th	
1968	3*	NB II Nyugat	2nd	
1960	3	NB II Nyugat	1st	

Season	Tier	Division	Place	Magyar Kupa
1970	2	NB I/B	4th	
1971	2	NB I/B	2nd	
1972	2	NB I/B	6th	
1973	2	NB I/B	5th	
1974	2	NB I/B	5th	
1975	2	NB I/B	4th	Did not held
1976	2	NB I/B	8th	
1977	2	NB I/B	8th	
1978	2	NB I/B	8th	
1979	2	NB I/B	9th	
1980	2	NB I/B	4th	
1981	2	NB I/B	4th	
1982	2	NB I/B	3rd	
1983	2	NB I/B	11th	*
1983	2	NB I/B	11th	*
1984	2	NB I/B	5th	
1985	2	NB I/B	8th	
1986	2	NB I/B	6th	
1987	2	NB I/B	5th	
1988	2	NB I/B	8th	Fourth place
only Magyar Kupa was held in 1988–89				

Season	Tier	Division	Place	Magyar Kupa
1989–90	2	NB I/B	1st	
1990–91	1	NB I	12th	
1991–92	1	NB I	6th	
1992–93	1	NB I	10th	
1993–94	1	NB I	4th	
1994–95	1	NB I	5th	
1995–96	1	NB I	10th	
1996–97	1	NB I	6th	
1997–98	1	NB I	7th	
1998–99	1	NB I	11th	
1999–00	2	NB I/B Nyugat	1st	
2000–01	1	NB I	9th	
2001–02	1	NB I	10th	
2002–03	1	NB I	12th	
2003–04	2	NB I/B Nyugat	4th	
2004–05	2	NB I/B Nyugat	1st	
2005–06	1	NB I	8th	Third place
2006–07	1	NB I	12th	Quarter-finals
2007–08	1	NB I	6th	
2008–09	1	NB I	14th	
2009–10	2	NB I/B Nyugat	4th	

Season	Tier	Division	Place	Magyar Kupa
2010–11	2	NB I/B Nyugat	4th	Round 3
2011–12	2	NB I/B Nyugat	4th	Round 3
2012–13	2	NB I/B Nyugat	5th	Round 3
2013–14	2	NB I/B Nyugat	2nd	Round 3
2014–15	1	NB I	12th	Round 3
2015–16	1	NB I	11th	Round 4
2016–17	1	NB I	8th	Round 4
2017–18	1	NB I	5th	Round 4
2018–19	1	NB I	9th	Round 4
2019–20	1	NB I	Cancelled due COVID-19	
2020–21	1	NB I	9th	Round 3
2021–22	1	NB I	7th	Round 4
2022–23	1	NB I	11th	Round 3
2023–24	1	NB I	12th	Round 3
2024–25	1	NB I	9th	Round 4
2025–26	1	NB I		

=== In European competition ===
Komló score listed first. As of 25 October 2018.

- Participations in EHF Cup: 2x
- Participations in Challenge Cup (City Cup): 1x
- Participations in Cup Winners' Cup: 1x

Season	Competition	Round	Club	Home	Away	Aggregate
1994–95	City Cup	Round of 32	(Portugal) ABC Braga	14–21	18–14	32–35
2006–07	Cup Winners' Cup	Second round	(Denmark) Bjerringbro-Silkeborg A/S	23–23	24–35	47–58
2008–09	EHF Cup	Third round	(Israel) Maccabi Rishon LeZion	36–35	27–40	63–75
2018–19	EHF Cup	Second qualifying round	(Greece) Olympiacos	34–29	22–27	56–56 (a)

==== EHF ranking ====
As of 25 September 2025

Rank	Team	Points
260	(Serbia) RK Železničar 1949	3
261	(Hungary) Budakalász FKC	3
262	(Slovenia) RK Maribor Branik	2
263	(Hungary) Carbonex-Komló	2
264	(Netherlands) Bevo HC	2
265	(Ukraine) Motor-Politekhnika	2
266	(Denmark) TMS Ringsted	2

== Former club members ==
=== Notable former players ===
==== Goalkeepers ====
- (Hungary) (United States) Pál Merkovszki (2023–2025)
- (Croatia) Ante Granić (2014–2024)
- (Iran) Mohammad Siavoshi (2024–2025)
- (Ukraine) Vasily Shevtsov (1990–1999)
- (Ukraine) Maksym Viunik (2025–)

==== Right wingers ====
- (Hungary) Attila Kalocsay (1996–2000)
- (Egypt) Mohammad Sanad (2015–2016)

==== Left wingers ====
- (Montenegro) Igor Marković (2015–2020)

==== Line players ====
- (Hungary) Gyula Gál (1993–1997)
- (Hungary) Levente Szrnka (2024–2025)
- (Algeria) Abdeldjalil Zennadi (2025–)
- (Bosnia and Herzegovina) Gafar Hadžiomerović (2014–2015)
- (Russia) (Hungary) Serguei Tolstykh (1992–2003)

==== Left backs ====
- (Hungary) Tamás Borsos (2024–)
- (Hungary) (Croatia) Srećko Jerković (2015–2026)
- (Hungary) Dávid Katzirz (2016–2020)
- (Hungary) Zoltán Keszthelyi (1982–2002)
- (Hungary) Norbert Sutka
- (Hungary) Bence Szöllősi
- (Bosnia and Herzegovina) Tarik Vranac (2021–2023)

==== Central backs ====
- (Hungary) László Papp (1985–2003)
- (Montenegro) Bogdan Petričević
- (Serbia) Savo Mešter (2014–2015)

==== Right backs ====
- (Hungary) Zoltán Németh (1991–1999)
- (Bosnia and Herzegovina) Branislav Obradović
- (Croatia) Josip Vekić (2023–2024)
- (Serbia) Nikola Potić
- (Ukraine) Vladyslav Dontsov (2025–2026)

=== Former coaches ===
Seasons	Coach	Country
2013–2014	Attila Farkas	(Hungary)
2014–2016	Ratko Đurković	(Montenegro)
2016–2023	Bálint Kilvinger	(Hungary)
2023–2024	György Marosán	(Hungary)
2024–2026	László György	(Hungary)
2026–	Dávid Péter Szabó	(Hungary)

|}
