= Bogdan Petričević =

Montenegrin handball player (born 1989)

Personal information
- Nationality: Montenegrin
- Born: 6 September 1989 (age 37) Cetinje, Montenegro
- Height: 1.94 m (6 ft 4 in)

Sport
- Sport: Handball
- Position: Centre back
- Current club: RK Lovćen
- Number: 23

Senior clubs
- Years: Team
- –2010: RK Lovćen
- 2010–2011: JD Arrate
- 2011–2012: CB Badajoz
- 2012–2013: Romagna HB
- 2013–2016: Mulhouse
- 2016–2017: 87 Limoges
- 2017–2018: Olympiacos
- 2018–2019: JS Cherbourg
- 2019–2023: SC Meran Handball
- 2023–: RK Lovćen
National team
Years	Team	Apps	(Gls)
–	Montenegro	13	(13)

Bogdan Petričević (born 6 September 1989) is a Montenegrin handball player who plays for RK Lovćen and the Montenegrin national team.
