= Paweł Paczkowski =

Polish handball player (born 1993)

Personal information
- Nationality: Polish
- Born: 14 June 1993 (age 33) Świecie, Poland
- Height: 1.95 m (6 ft 5 in)

Sport
- Sport: Handball
- Position: Right back
- Current club: Industria Kielce
- Number: 34

Youth career
- Years: Team
- –2010: Siódemka Świecie

Senior clubs
- Years: Team
- 2010–2014: Wisła Płock
- 2014–2024: Industria Kielce
- 2014–2015: → Dunkerque HGL (loan)
- 2017–2019: → Motor Zaporizhzhia (loan)
- 2019–2020: → Telekom Veszprém (loan)
- 2020–2022: → Meshkov Brest (loan)
- 2024–: Toyota Auto Body Brave Kings
National team
Years	Team	Apps	(Gls)
2012–	Poland	34	(75)

Paweł Paczkowski (born 14 June 1993) is a Polish handball player who plays for Industria Kielce.

He participated at the 2017 World Men's Handball Championship.
