= József Éles =

Hungarian handball player (born 1969)

Personal information
- Nationality: Hungarian
- Born: 16 February 1969 (age 57) Budapest, Hungary
- Height: 1.90 m (6 ft 3 in)

Sport
- Sport: Handball
- Position: Left Back, Playmaker

Senior clubs
- Years: Team
- 1982–1989: Budapest Spartacus SC
- 1989–1991: Solymári SC
- 1991–2003: KC Veszprém
- 2003–2005: AO Filippos Verias
- 2005–2006: GC Amicitia Zürich
National team
Years	Team	Apps	(Gls)
1989–2000	Hungary	179	(828)

Teams managed
- 2006–2007: GC Amicitia Zürich
- 2007–2008: TV Endingen
- 2008: CSU Politehnica Timişoara
- 2008–2009: Gyöngyösi FKK
- 2009–2010: Kiskunhalas NKSE
- 2011: Dominican Republic Women

József Éles (born 16 February 1969 in Budapest) is a former Hungarian international handball player and handball coach.

== Playing career ==
=== Club ===
==== Early career and Veszprém success ====
Éles started his career in Budapest Spartacus SC in the Hungarian second division. He moved to first division side Pemű-Honvéd in 1989 and led the team of the little town of Solymár to a podium place in 1991. His performances attracted the attention of domestic powerhouse KC Veszprém, which ran under the name Bramac SE at the time, and Éles was signed by the Bakony-side team in the summer of 1991.

He spent thirteen years in Veszprém and won an impressive ten Hungarian Championship and as many Hungarian Cup titles. During his spell at the club, Veszprém transformed to an acclaimed and feared opponent on continental level as well: they lifted the EHF Cup Winners' Cup trophy in 1992, after beating TSV Milbertshofen in the finals. They were only one step away to repeat their success in the next season, however, this time they fell short against OM Vitrolles.

==== Car crash ====
On 1 July 2000, in the early hours Éles crashed his car into a ditch near Kiskunmajsa. The handballer was taken to the hospital of Kiskunhalas in a serious but not life-threatening condition. He was diagnosed with brain concussion, a broken collarbone and torn knee ligaments. He went through several operations and it was initially doubtful whether he would be able to play professional handball again. He left the hospital on July 18, and began a long rehabilitation process in Veszprém. He fully recovered from his injury and returned to the field on a pre-season friendly tournament in Germany on 29 August 2001.

==== Playing abroad and first coaching steps ====
Éles won back his old form, and led his team into the EHF Champions League finals in 2002, where they faced SC Magdeburg. After winning the first leg on a two goals difference, the German team showed their class and turned the things around with a 30–25 victory on home soil.

In early 2003 there were rumors about the possible departure of Éles as he was linked with many clubs including THW Kiel, HSG Nordhorn and TV Grosswallstadt. He finally signed a two-year contract with AO Filippos Verias, where he joined former legends Aleksandr Tuchkin and Vyacheslav Atavin. Yet in the summer of 2003 there was organized a farewell match for Éles between his old and new club. The left back has worn his legendary number 6 shirt the very last time, that was eventually retired after the game.

In December 2004, GC Amicitia Zürich made a special offer to sign Éles as a player and coach. His existing contract was terminated by mutual agreement, went into immediate effect, and Éles joined the Swiss club in January. Under his guidance the team performed excellent, and finished second at the end of the season. However, after a rich businessman, Arnold Schuler took over the club and merged it with Grasshoppers, the things have changed quickly. Schuler had his plan and Éles was released to make space for his own players and staff. Not much later he was approached by TV Endingen, the team that finished just behind Amiticia in the second division campaign that year. Éles accepted a one-year deal and since then he concentrates fully on his coaching career.

=== International ===
He made his international debut on 24 November 1989 against Bulgaria. His first major tournament was the 1992 Summer Olympics, where the Hungarian team placed seventh. One year later he participated on the 1993 World Championship in Sweden, where despite Hungary finished on a disappointing eleventh place, Éles topped the scoring charts with 41 goals. On the 1997 World Championship he was in inspired form once again and finished second on the top scorers' list with 59 goals, only three short to Yoon Kyung-shin. He was present on further two World Championships in 1995 and 1999, and also played on the 1994 European Championship.

== Coaching career ==
Éles functioned first as a player-coach during his late years by GC Amiticia Zürich before turned into a full-time trainer in 2006. After his contract was terminated by the new owner of Amiticia, he signed a one-year deal with TV Endingen in May 2007. However, he left the club for relegation struggling CSU Politehnica Timişoara as early as March 2008 with only five matches left from the ongoing Romanian championship. His mission to keep the purple-whites in the top division failed on the field, but due to the expansion of the league his team maintained their Liga Națională membership.

Éles revealed his wish to train a Hungarian team earlier, and although Poli became a mid-table team with a strengthened squad in the following season, when in October 2008 he was offered a contract by Gyöngyösi FKK, he did not hesitate too long and joined the Nemzeti Bajnokság I outfit. He achieved his first success as coach with Gyöngyös, when took the Hungarian Cup bronze medal after beating Ferencvárosi TC. Since finalists SC Pick Szeged and MKB Veszprém already secured their place in the Champions League, with this bronze medal Gyöngyös also earned a spot in the Cup Winners' Cup for next year. However, despite the good results in the cup, the club get relegated from the Hungarian championship at the end of the season and Éles was sacked.

The last team he managed up to date is the women's handball club Kiskunhalas NKSE. He took the hot seat in October 2009, when the club was at the very bottom of the table without a single point. Éles could not make miracle and Kiskunhalas finished second from behind at the end of the season. As a result, his contract was not extended, but as he stated it was a very useful experience for him. He never worked with women before and he was pleasantly surprised. He felt they work more diligent and more humble than men, and also added that if he had to choose at the moment, he would rather train women in the future.

On 15 February 2011 Éles was appointed as the head coach of the Dominican Republic women's national team and was set the goal to reach a podium place on the forthcoming Pan American Games and thus qualify for the 2011 World Championship. In order to fulfil this plan, the team will train in Hungary for two months, starting from early April and will play friendly matches against Hungarian club teams.

== Personal ==
He has two sons, Benedek and Zsombor. They train in the Éles Kézisuli, a handball academy that was founded by Éles and wears his name.

== Achievements ==
=== As player ===
- Nemzeti Bajnokság I:
  - Winner: 1992, 1993, 1994, 1995, 1997, 1998, 1999, 2001, 2002, 2003
  - Silver Medallist: 1996, 2000
  - Bronze Medallist: 1991
- Magyar Kupa:
  - Winner: 1992, 1993, 1994, 1995, 1996, 1998, 1999, 2000, 2002, 2003
- EHF Champions League:
  - Finalist: 2002
- EHF Cup Winners' Cup:
  - Winner: 1992
  - Finalist: 1993

=== As coach ===
- Magyar Kupa – men:
  - Bronze Medallist: 2009

== Individual awards ==
- Hungarian Handballer of the Year: 1992, 1993, 1997
- World Championship Top Scorer: 1993
- Nemzeti Bajnokság I Top Scorer: 1998
