= 2012 Macedonian Handball Cup =

2012 Cup of Macedonian Handball

Tournament details
- Venue: SC Boris Trajkovski (in Skopje host cities)
- Dates: 18 – 20 May
- Teams: 4

Final positions
- Champions: RK Vardar PRO (8th title)
- Runners-up: RK Metalurg

Tournament statistics
- Matches played: 3
- Goals scored: 151 (50.33 per match)

The 2012 Macedonian Handball Cup was the 20th edition of the Macedonian Handball Cup. It took place at the Boris Trajkovski Sports Center in Skopje, Republic of Macedonia, between 18 and 20 May 2012. The cup was won by RK Vardar PRO for the eighth time.

== Venue ==
Skopje
Boris Trajkovski Sports Center
Capacity: 6,000
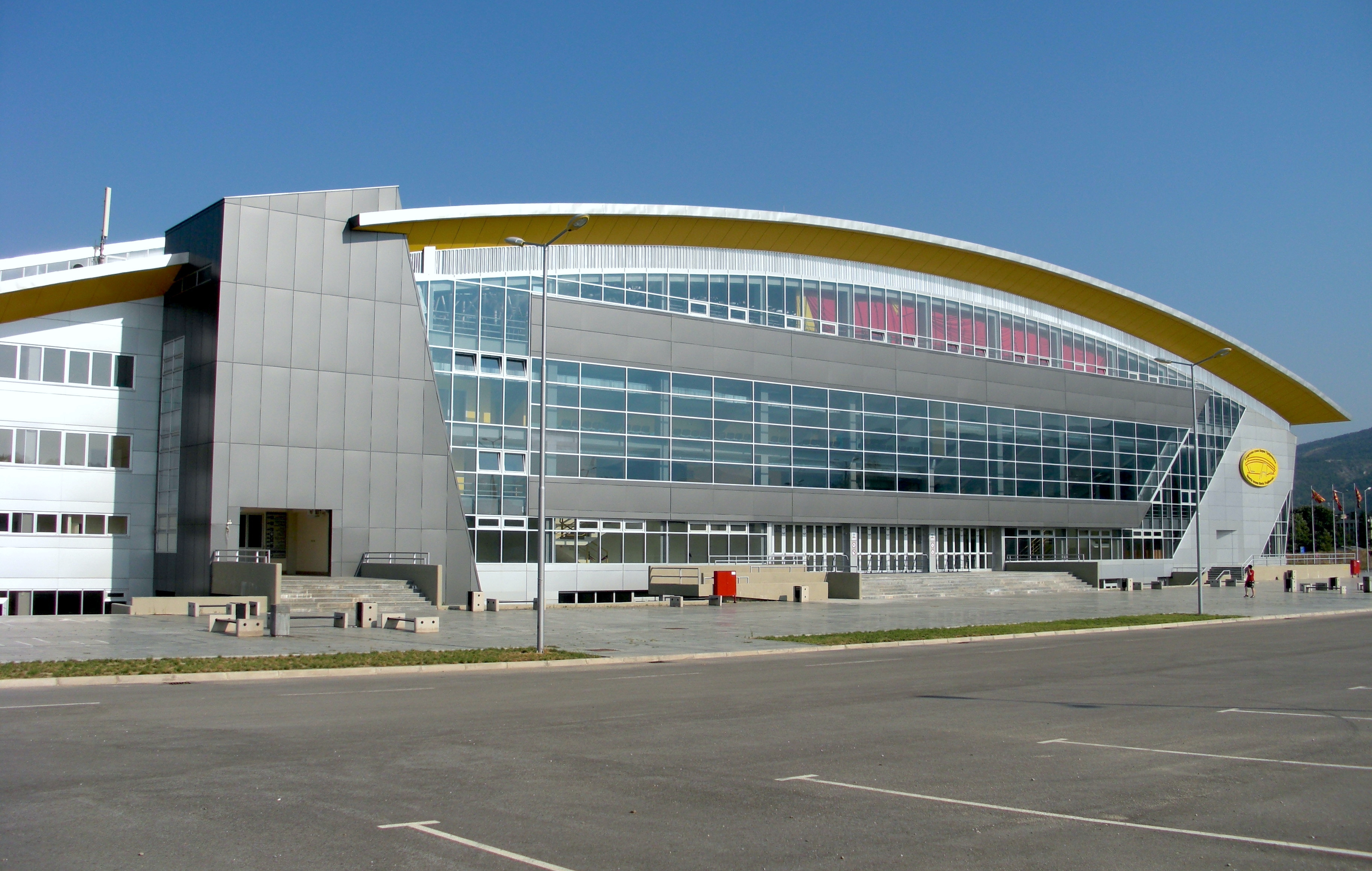

== Knockout stage ==
=== Semifinals ===
| 18 May, 2012; 17:45 CEST | RK Vardar PRO | 42 – 17 | RK Pelister | SC Boris Trajkovski, Skopje |
| 18 May, 2012; 17:45 CEST | Jovčevski & Oljeski, 9 | (16 – 8) | Boševski & Dimitrovski, 4 | SC Boris Trajkovski, Skopje |
| 18 May, 2012; 17:45 CEST | | Report | | SC Boris Trajkovski, Skopje |

| 18 May, 2012; 20:10 CEST | RK Metalurg | 33 – 10 | RK Kumanovo | SC Boris Trajkovski, Skopje; Referees: Gjoko Kolevski & Sašo Krkačev |
| 18 May, 2012; 20:10 CEST | Marković & Georgievski, 6 | (18 – 3) | Blažeski & Dimkovski, 3 | SC Boris Trajkovski, Skopje; Referees: Gjoko Kolevski & Sašo Krkačev |
| 18 May, 2012; 20:10 CEST | | Report | | SC Boris Trajkovski, Skopje; Referees: Gjoko Kolevski & Sašo Krkačev |

=== Final ===
| 20 May, 2012; 17:30 CEST | RK Vardar PRO | 26 – 23 | RK Metalurg | SC Boris Trajkovski, Skopje; Referees: Dimitar Mitrevski & Blagojče Todorovski |
| 20 May, 2012; 17:30 CEST | Marković, 6 | (13 – 14) | Mojsovski, 8 | SC Boris Trajkovski, Skopje; Referees: Dimitar Mitrevski & Blagojče Todorovski |
| 20 May, 2012; 17:30 CEST | | Report | | SC Boris Trajkovski, Skopje; Referees: Dimitar Mitrevski & Blagojče Todorovski |

2012 Macedonian Handball Cup Winners
RK Vardar PRO
8th Title

== See also ==
- 2011–12 Macedonian Handball Super League
