= RK Eurofarm Pelister 2 =

Macedonian handball team

РК Еурофарм Пелистер 2 RK Eurofarm Pelister II
- Full name: Rakometen klub Eurofarm Pelister II
- Short name: Pelister II
- Founded: 1955; 71 years ago as Pelister
- Arena: Sports Hall Boro Čurlevski, Bitola
- President: Zoran Sterjev
- Head coach: Branislav Angelovski
- League: Macedonian Super League
- 2026/27: ?
- Club colours
| Home | Away |

Active departments of Pelister
| FK Pelister | RK Eurofarm Pelister | KK Pelister |

RK Eurofarm Pelister II (Macedonian: РК Еурофарм Пелистер 2) is a team handball club from Bitola, North Macedonia. It serves as the second team for RK Eurofarm Pelister.

== History ==
The original team was the first handball club in Macedonia, formed in 1946 under the name Pelagonija. It later changed its name to Pelister in 1955. The 60s were very successful, winning 4 championships starting in 1960 till the last one in 1969. The club ended up winning three more titles in the 70s. In the 80s, the 1981 season was the last winning season, capturing their 8th Macedonian league title. From the 1983-84 season, Pelister began to participate regularly in the Yugoslav Handball Championship. They finished in third place in 1985 and were runners-up in back-to-back seasons (1986–87 and 1987–88) behind the dominant club Metaloplastika Šabac. Around that time the slogan "He who hasn't played in Bitola doesn't know what real support looks like" gained popularity, being uttered by the likes of Vlado Šola, Lino Červar and Zlatan Saračević. Pelister became the first Macedonian club to play in Europe. In 1986 they defeated AS Filippos Veriasand in the 1st round, but they ended up losing in 1/8 finals from Atlético Madrid BM winning 24:19 at home and 10:19 away (34:38) aggregate. In the 1988/1989 season they reached the EHF Cup quarterfinal, eliminating SPE Strovolos Nicosia, HC Banik and finally losing out to German club ASK Vorwärts. The first leg in Bitola was won by six goals, but the second leg in Berlin resulted in a loss by seven points 22:16 and 13:22 (35:38). When the Macedonian Handball Super League was formed in 1992, Pelister became the most successful club in the country, winning five league titles and five Cups that decade. In 1996, they made it to the semi-finals of the EHF Cup Winners' Cup where they lost on aggregate by one goal to the eventual champion TBV Lemgo. A record, 7,000 fans were in attendance for the rematch in Bitola. Another proof of Pelisters' dominance at the time, seven players on Macedonia's squad at the 1999 World Men's Handball Championship in Egypt played for the club.

The club's most successful European run was made during the 2001/02 season when they played in the EHF Challenge Cup. First, they started by beating Zilant Kazan in the 3rd round and advanced to round 4, where they went on to defeat Paris Saint-Germain. In the quarterfinal they got past GAS Kilkis 52-51, setting up a semifinal match-up with Frederiksberg IF. Pelister would go on to win that tie in dramatic fashion in Bitola, when Naumče Mojsovski scored a goal in the final seconds of the game to even the score on aggregate, going through on a penalty shootout by the final score of 61-60. In the final, Pelister lost to Skjern Håndbold, but even in that match-up they still ended up winning the home game by 7 goals. Proving yet again that it was no easy task for any road team to win in Bitola.

In 2005, Trifun Kostovski with Kometal became sponsor of the club bringing back the glory days, winning another double crown and capturing its sixth domestic league title, which was a record at the time. However, the success was short lived as Kometal left following that season. Afterwards, Pelister was marred by financial problems and struggled to achieve the same level of success.

On 29 November 2019, a joint ownership was signed by the owners of RK Eurofarm Rabotnik (which as formed in 2011 and owned by Eurofarm) and RK Pelister (owned by Bitola Municipality). According to the platform, RK Eurofarm Rabotnik would change the name to RK Eurofarm Pelister, and the original RK Pelister would change its name to RK Eurofarm Pelister 2. Eurofarm Pelister will be the leading club with high European ambitions, while Eurofarm Pelister 2 will be a developmental club filled with young handball players from Bitola and all of Macedonia. The combination of a strong sponsor and a sports brand known throughout the former Yugoslavia took final shape through an agreement with the city administration in 2020. Eurofarm Pelister has already surpassed the domestic framework, played in the EHF Champions League and set the contours of a team that could return trophies back to "Boro Čurlevski" arena.

== Crest, colours, supporters ==
=== Kits ===
HOME
| 2022–23 | 2023–24 |

== Accomplishments ==
=== Domestic (North Macedonia) ===
- League Champions

Winner (14): 1961, 1966, 1968, 1969, 1970, 1971, 1979, 1981, 1993, 1994, 1996, 1998, 2000, 2005

- Cup Winners

Winner (6): 1990, 1994, 1996, 1998, 1999, 2005

=== International ===
- Doboj International Handball Tournament (2)

1st: 1996 and 1997

=== European (European Union) ===
- EHF Cup

Quarter-finalist (1): 1988-89

- EHF Cup Winners' Cup

3rd: 1995-96

- EHF Challenge Cup

2nd:: 2001–02

== Arena ==
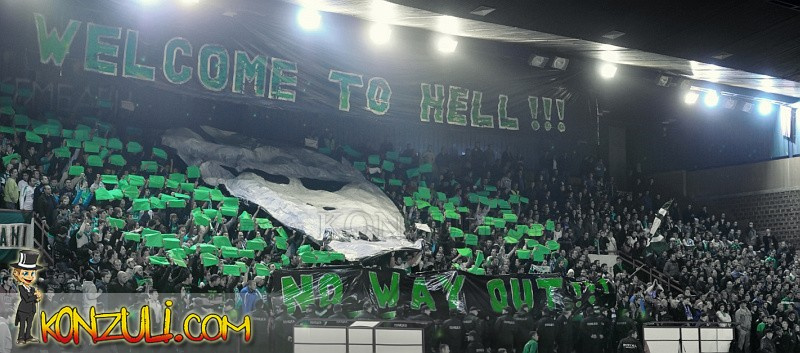
Arena Churlevski

Sports hall "Mladost" (Macedonian: Спортска сала „Младост“) is a multi-purpose sports arena located in Bitola, North Macedonia. It was built in 1975 by the citizens of Bitola and is mainly used for handball by RK Pelister and RK Bitola, and for basketball by KK Pelister. There is also room for bowling and table tennis plus it has been used for concerts. The Arena hosted the 2007 Macedonian Basketball Cup. This sports hall was the largest on the territory of North Macedonia before the construction of the Boris Trajkovski Sports Center in Skopje.

On 21 July 2009, the arena is undergoing renovation. A new parquet floor will be installed along with new seats. The locker rooms will also be updated to meet EHF standards. Total cost of the project is about €30,000.

In January 2017, renovation of interior of the hall started. The renovation covered the floor, the stands, a new score board and a new heating system. The first match in the renovated arena was played on April 6, 2017, with the match between RK Pelister and RK Metalurg in the second round of the handball Super League play-off.

At the end of July 2018, the name of the hall was changed to "Boro Churlevski", in honor of the late Boro Churlevski, a former handball player from Bitola.Churlevski Arena has a capacity of 4000 seats.

== Supporters ==
Abdomens (Macedonian: Чкембари) are an Ultras group, established in 1985, who support the Macedonian sports clubs from Bitola that compete under the Pelister banner, mainly FK Pelister in football and RK Pelister in handball. The group was founded in 1985 when a caravan of 15 buses traveled to support RK Pelister who was playing against Partizan Bjelovar in a handball relegation play-off match. At that time they used the name BMČM - Bitolčani, Motorcyclists, Čkembari, Macedonians (македонски: БМЧМ - Битолчани, Мотокари, Чкембари, Македонци) later shortened to just Čkembari. Soon after, the first green and white banners were created that read: "Hell Boys" (македонски: Пеколни момци) and "Green Conquerors" (македонски: Зелени освојувачи) which started organized support for Pelister at every match. Since Eurofarm Rabotnik and Pelister got mutual ownership, Čkembari became supporters of Eurofarm Rabotnik (renamed after the mutual ownership as Eurofarm Pelister).

== Current squad ==
Squad for the 2026–27 season

Goalkeepers

- 1 (North Macedonia) Melin Fehmi
- 12 (North Macedonia) Marko Trajkov
- 16 (North Macedonia) Ivan Mladenov

Right Wingers

- 5 (North Macedonia) Aleksandar Stojkov
- 19 (North Macedonia) Andrej Damčevski
- 20 (North Macedonia) Andrej Georgiev

Left Wingers

- 4 (North Macedonia) Leonid Lozanovski
- 15 (North Macedonia) Stefan Lazarevski
- 22 (North Macedonia) Ivan Dimitrovski

Line players

- 8 (North Macedonia) Ivan Veleski
- 23 (North Macedonia) Jovan Simonovski
- 26 (North Macedonia) Aleksandar Slavkov
- 88 (North Macedonia) Kristijan Simonoski

Left Backs

- 2 (North Macedonia) David Dimevski
- 6 (North Macedonia) Teo Spirovski
- 10 (North Macedonia) Hristijan Mitrevski
- 18 (North Macedonia) Aldin Fehmi
- 55 (North Macedonia) Stefan Drogrishki

Central Backs

- 13 (North Macedonia) Slavčo Šuleski
- 17 (North Macedonia) Božidar Ilieski
- 30 (North Macedonia) Marin Krstevski

Right Backs

- 11 (Montenegro) Danilo Gutić
- 77 (North Macedonia) Luka Gjorgievski

=== Transfers ===
Transfers for the 2026–27 season

Joining

- (North Macedonia) Kristijan Simonoski (LP) from (North Macedonia) RK Alkaloid
- (North Macedonia) David Dimevski (LB) from (North Macedonia) MRK Kumanovo
- (North Macedonia) Aleksandar Stojkov (RW) from (North Macedonia) MRK Kumanovo
- (North Macedonia) Marko Trajkov (GK) from (North Macedonia) RK Tineks Prolet
- (North Macedonia) Branislav Angelovski (HC) (free agent)
- (North Macedonia) Božidar Ilieski (CB) (from (North Macedonia) RK Prilep 2010)
- (North Macedonia) Marin Krstevski (CB) (from (North Macedonia) RK Multi Essence)
- (North Macedonia) Luka Gjorgievski (RB) (back from loan (North Macedonia) RK Prilep 2010)
- (Montenegro) Danilo Gutić (RB) (from (Germany) TVB Stuttgart)
- (North Macedonia) Andrej Georgiev (RW) (from youth team)
- (North Macedonia) Jovan Simonovski (LP) (from youth team)

Leaving

- (Tunisia) Mohamed Aziz Ben Mahfoudh (LB) to (North Macedonia) GRK Tikveš
- (North Macedonia) Petar Markoski (LP) to (North Macedonia) RK Prilep 2010
- (North Macedonia) Martin Jovanovski (GK) to (North Macedonia) RK Struga
- (North Macedonia) Tomče Pecakovski (LB) (to (North Macedonia) RK Dračevo)
- (France) Baptiste Audiffred (RB) (to (Spain) Club Balonmano Nava)
- (North Macedonia) Bojan Gičev (RB) (to (North Macedonia) MRK Kumanovo)
- (North Macedonia) Nenad Belistojanoski (RW) (to (North Macedonia) RK Eurofarm Pelister)
- (North Macedonia) Jovan Danevski (RW) (to (Germany) ATSV Habenhausen)

=== Technical staff ===
- (North Macedonia) Head Coach: Branislav Angelovski
- (North Macedonia) Assistant coach: Faruk Memic
- (Georgia (country)) Assistant coach: Revaz Chanturia
- (North Macedonia) Goalkeeping coach: Filip Ivanovski
- (North Macedonia) Physiotherapist: Ivancho Todorovski
- (North Macedonia) Conditioning coach: Vasko Dimitrovski

== Notable former players as Pelister ==
- (North Macedonia) Vasko Dimitrovski
- (North Macedonia) Pepi Manaskov
- (North Macedonia) Kiril Lazarov
- (North Macedonia) Filip Lazarov
- (North Macedonia) Vlatko Mitkov
- (North Macedonia) Stevče Aluševski
- (North Macedonia) Zlatko Mojsovski
- (North Macedonia) Petar Angelov
- (North Macedonia) Naumče Mojsovski
- (North Macedonia) Vančo Dimovski
- (North Macedonia) Aco Jonovski
- (North Macedonia) Vladimir Temelkov
- (North Macedonia) Rade Stojanović
- (North Macedonia) Branislav Angelovski
- (North Macedonia) Zvonko Šundovski
- (North Macedonia) Stefan Drogrishki
- (North Macedonia) Filip Kuzmanovski
- (North Macedonia) Zoran Petkovski
- (North Macedonia) Ivan Markovski
- (North Macedonia) Nikola Mitrevski
- (North Macedonia) Vasil Mitevski
- (North Macedonia) Boris Churlevski
- (North Macedonia) Igor Nikolovski
- (North Macedonia) Kire Popovski
- (North Macedonia) Kire Mitrevski
- (North Macedonia) Igor Trajkovski
- (North Macedonia) Goce Makalovski
- (North Macedonia) Tome Petrevski
- (North Macedonia) Aleksandar Zarkov
- (North Macedonia) Lazar Spirovski
- (North Macedonia) Zlatko Dimitrovski
- (North Macedonia) Igor Toskovski
- (North Macedonia) Stevce Stefanovski
- (North Macedonia) Abdula Jusifovski
- (Serbia) Dušan Novokmet
- (North Macedonia) Šandor Hodik
- (Serbia) Dejan Peric
- (Serbia) Aleksandar Stanojević
- (Bosnia and Herzegovina) Bilal Šuman

== Notable former players as Eurofarm Pelister 2 ==
- (North Macedonia) Stefan Drogrishki
- (North Macedonia) Jovan Talevski
- (North Macedonia) Blagojče Trajkovski
- (North Macedonia) Dimitar Dimitrioski
- (North Macedonia) Vasko Dimitrovski
- (North Macedonia) Dejan Kukulovski
- (North Macedonia) Filip Arsenovski
- (North Macedonia) Bojan Madzovski
- (Serbia) Milan Đukić
- (Bosnia and Herzegovina) Pavle Petrović
- (Bosnia and Herzegovina) Alem Hadžić
- (Montenegro) Meris Bošnjak
- (Montenegro) Vasilije Pečurica
- (Montenegro) Bogdan Mijušković
- (Tunisia) Mohamed Aziz Ben Mahfoudh
- (France) Baptiste Audiffred

== Notable former coaches as Pelister ==
- (Croatia) Ante Kostelić
- (Bosnia and Herzegovina) Kasim Kamenica
- (Serbia) Nikola "Gužva" Jevremović
- (Serbia) Zoran Zečević
- (Serbia) Joško Petkovič
- (Montenegro) Ratko Đurković
- (Romania) Bogdan Macovei
- (North Macedonia) Stevče Stefanovski
- (North Macedonia) Zvonko Šundovski
- (North Macedonia) Borče Markovski
- (North Macedonia) Tome Petreski
- (North Macedonia) Aleksandar Zarkov

== Notable former coaches as Eurofarm Pelister 2 ==
- (North Macedonia) Aleksandar Jovikj
- (North Macedonia) Aleksandar Zarkov
