= Filip Mirkulovski =

Macedonian handball player

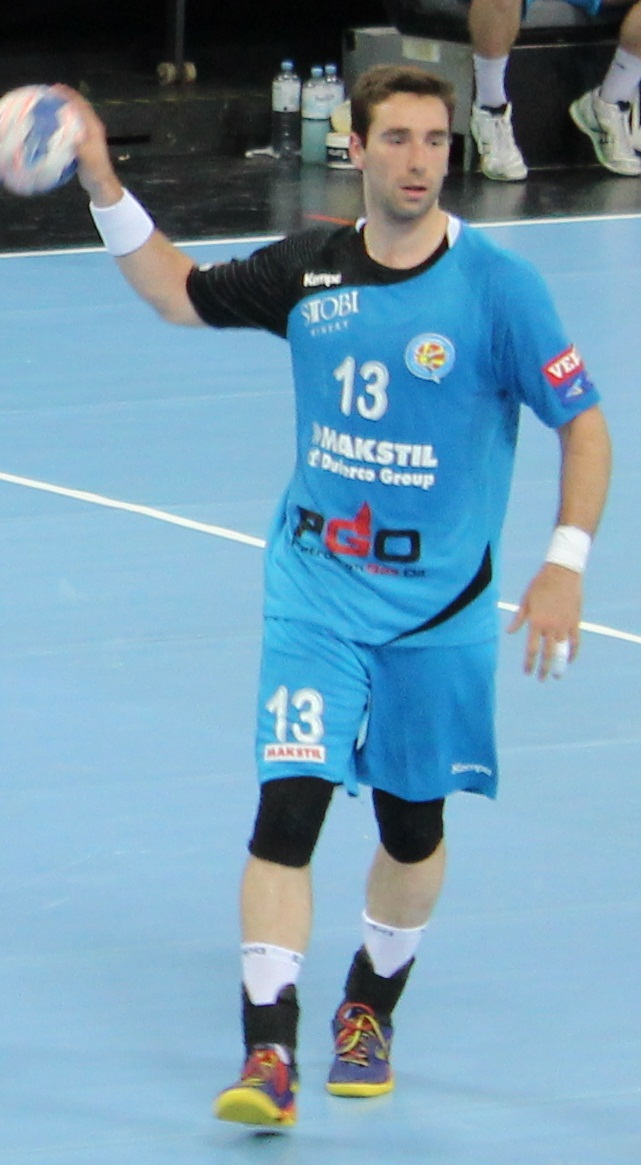

Personal information
- Nationality: Macedonian
- Born: 14 September 1983 (age 43) Skopje, SR Macedonia, SFR Yugoslavia
- Height: 1.89 m (6 ft 2 in)

Sport
- Sport: Handball
- Position: Centre back

Youth career
- Years: Team
- 1996–2003: RK Makedonija

Senior clubs
- Years: Team
- 2003–2004: RK Metalurg Skopje
- 2004–2005: Mladost Bogdanci
- 2005–2015: RK Metalurg Skopje
- 2015: TSV Hannover-Burgdorf
- 2015–2022: HSG Wetzlar
National team
| Years | Team | Apps | (Gls) |
| 2003–2022 | North Macedonia | 126 | (315) |

Teams managed
- 2020–2022: HSG Wetzlar (assistant)
- 2021–2023: North Macedonia (asst.)
- 2022: HSG Wetzlar (interim)
- 2022–2023: HSG Wetzlar (assistant)
- 2023: HSG Wetzlar (interim)
- 2023–2025: HSG Wetzlar

Filip Mirkulovski (Macedonian: Филип Миркуловски) (born 14 September 1983) is a retired Macedonian handball player.

== Honours ==
- Macedonian Handball Super League (North Macedonia)

Winners Gold (6): 2005-06, 2007-08, 2009-10, 2010-11, 2011-12 and 2013-14

- Macedonian Handball Cup (North Macedonia)

Winners Gold (5): 2006, 2009, 2010, 2011 2013
