= Goce Georgievski =

Macedonian handball player

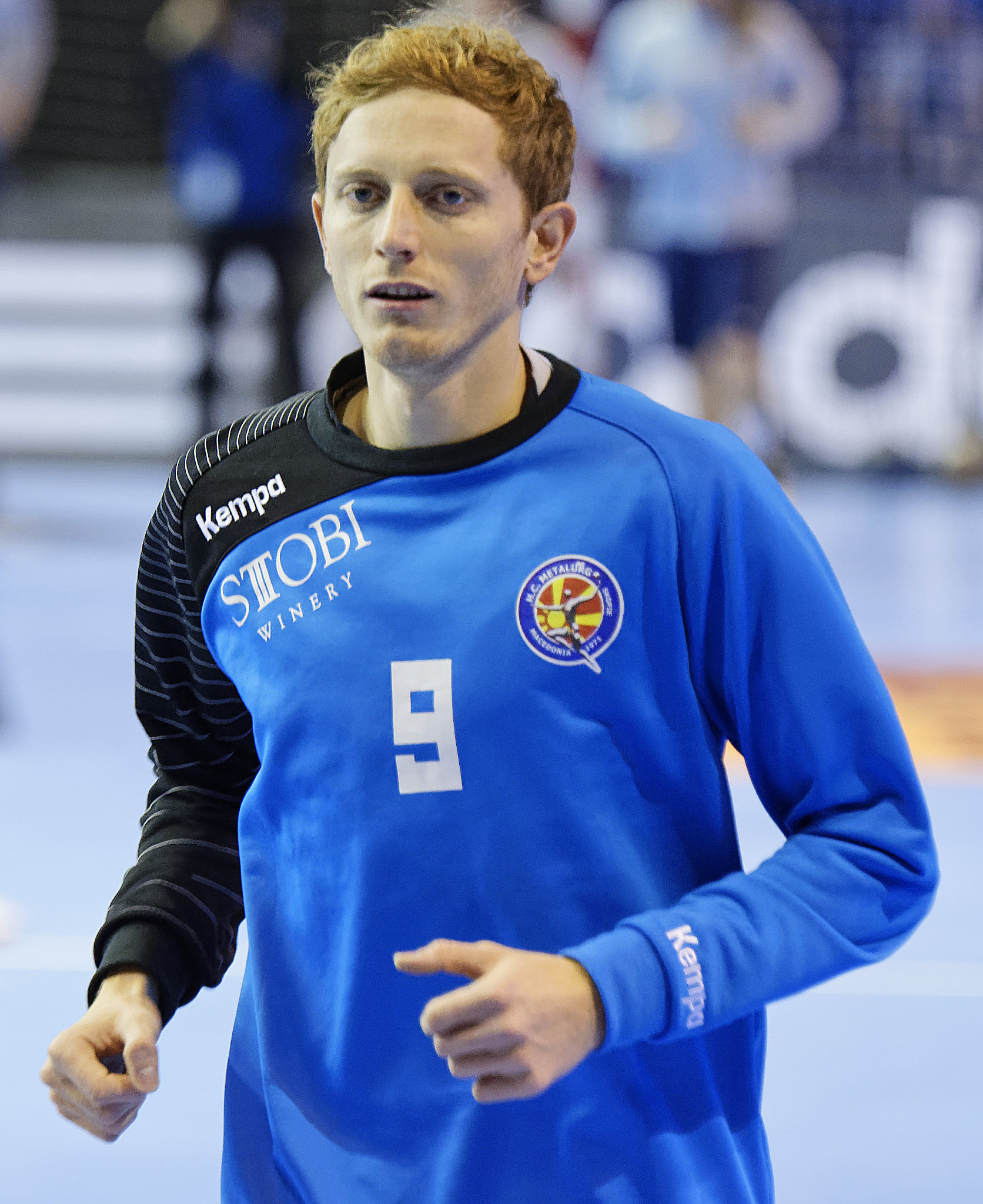

Personal information
- Nationality: Macedonian
- Born: 12 February 1987 (age 39) Skopje, SR Macedonia
- Height: 1.85 m (6 ft 1 in)

Sport
- Sport: Handball
- Position: Right wing
- Current club: RK Vardar 1961
- Number: 9

Youth career
- Years: Team
- 2003–2006: RK Metalurg Skopje

Senior clubs
- Years: Team
- 2006–2015: RK Metalurg Skopje
- 2015–2016: Fenix Toulouse
- 2016–2020: CSM București
- 2020–: RK Vardar 1961
National team
Years	Team	Apps	(Gls)
2007–2023	North Macedonia	120	(280)

Goce Georgievski (born 12 February 1987) is a Macedonian handball player for RK Vardar 1961 and the North Macedonia national team.

== Achievements ==
- RK Metalurg Skopje
- Macedonian Handball Super League

Winners Gold: 2006, 2008, 2010, 2011, 2012 and 2014

- Macedonian Handball Cup

Winners Gold : 2006, 2009, 2010, 2011 2013

- RK Vardar
- Macedonian Handball Super League

Winner:2021, 2022, 2026

- Macedonian Handball Cup

Winner:2021, 2022, 2023, 2026

=== European competitions ===
- CSM București
- EHF Challenge Cup:
  - Winners: 2018–19
