= Macovei (surname) =

Macovei is a surname. Notable people with the surname include:

- Andrei Macovei, Moldovan chess master
- Bogdan Macovei (disambiguation)
  - Bogdan Macovei (handball coach), a Romanian handball coach
  - Bogdan Macovei (luger), a Romanian-born Moldovan luger
- Florin Macovei, football player
- Gheorghe Macovei
- Ion Macovei, engineer
- Monica Macovei, Member of the European Parliament
- Toma Macovei, Interlingua scholar

== See also ==
- Macov
- Macoviște (disambiguation)
