= Milan Lazarevski =

Macedonian handball player

Personal information
- Nationality: Macedonian
- Born: 9 February 1997 (age 29) Skopje, Macedonia
- Height: 1.94 m (6 ft 4 in)

Sport
- Sport: Handball
- Position: Pivot
- Current club: RK Vardar 1961
- Number: 18

Senior clubs
- Years: Team
- 2015–2017: RK Metalurg II
- 2017–2021: RK Metalurg Skopje
- 2022: RK Trimo Trebnje
- 2022–: RK Vardar 1961
National team
Years	Team	Apps	(Gls)
2018–	Macedonia	4	(7)

Milan Lazarevski (Macedonian: Милан Лазаревски) (born 9 February 1997) is a Macedonian handball player for RK Vardar 1961 and the Macedonian national team.

He participated at the 2017 Men's Junior World Handball Championship.

== Honors ==
- Domestic (North Macedonia)

HC Metalurg

- Macedonian Handball Cup

Winner Gold : 2019

HC Vardar

- Macedonian Handball Super League (North Macedonia)

Winner Gold : 2026

- Macedonian Handball Cup

Winner: 2023, 2026
