= Mihajlo Mladenovikj =

Macedonian handball player

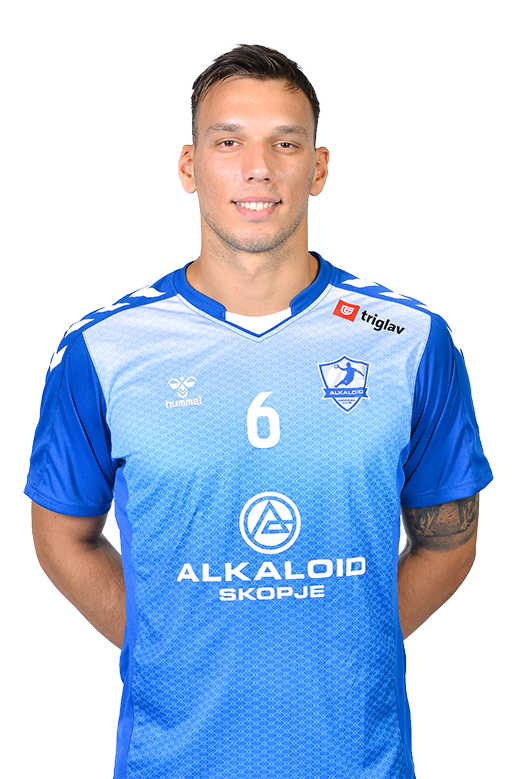

Personal information
- Nationality: Serbian/Macedonian
- Born: 21 September 2000 (age 26) Vranje, Serbia
- Height: 1.94 m (6 ft 4 in)

Sport
- Sport: Handball
- Position: Left Back
- Current club: US Créteil Handball
- Number: 6

Youth career
- Years: Team
- –: RK Vranje
- –: RK Metalurg Skopje

Senior clubs
- Years: Team
- –: RK Metalurg II
- 2018–2020: RK Metalurg Skopje
- 2019–2020: → RK Aerodrom
- 2020–2022: GRK Ohrid
- 2022–2025: RK Alkaloid
- 2025–: US Créteil Handball
National team
- Years: Team
- 2019–: Macedonia

Mihajlo Mladenovikj (born 21 September 2000) is a Serbian-born Macedonian handball player who plays for US Créteil Handball and the Macedonian national team.

== Honours ==
RK Metalurg Skopje (North Macedonia)

- Macedonian Handball Cup

Winner (1): 2019

RK Alkaloid (North Macedonia)

- Macedonian Handball Cup

Winner (1): 2024

- Macedonian Handball Super Cup

Winner (1): 2024

- EHF European Cup

Winner (1): 2024-25
