= Marko Neloski =

Macedonian handball player

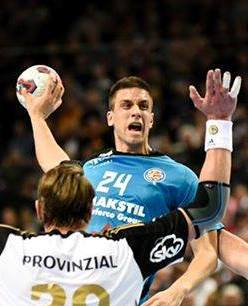

Personal information
- Nationality: Macedonian
- Born: 6 June 1996 (age 30) Struga, Macedonia
- Height: 2.00 m (6 ft 6 1/2 in)

Sport
- Sport: Handball
- Position: Left back

Youth career
- Years: Team
- –: RK Struga Ilinden
- 2010–2014: RK Metalurg II

Senior clubs
- Years: Team
- 2014–2017: RK Metalurg Skopje
- 2017–2018: TV Hüttenberg
- 2017–2018: → HSC 2000 Coburg
National team
Years	Team	Apps	(Gls)
2016–2018	Macedonia	6	(3)

Marko Neloski (Macedonian: Марко Нелоски) (born 06 June 1996) is a retired Macedonian handball player.

He participated at the 2017 World Men's Handball Championship, as well as at the 2017 Men's Junior World Handball Championship.
