= Zlatko Mojsoski =

Macedonian handball player

Zlatko Mojsovski
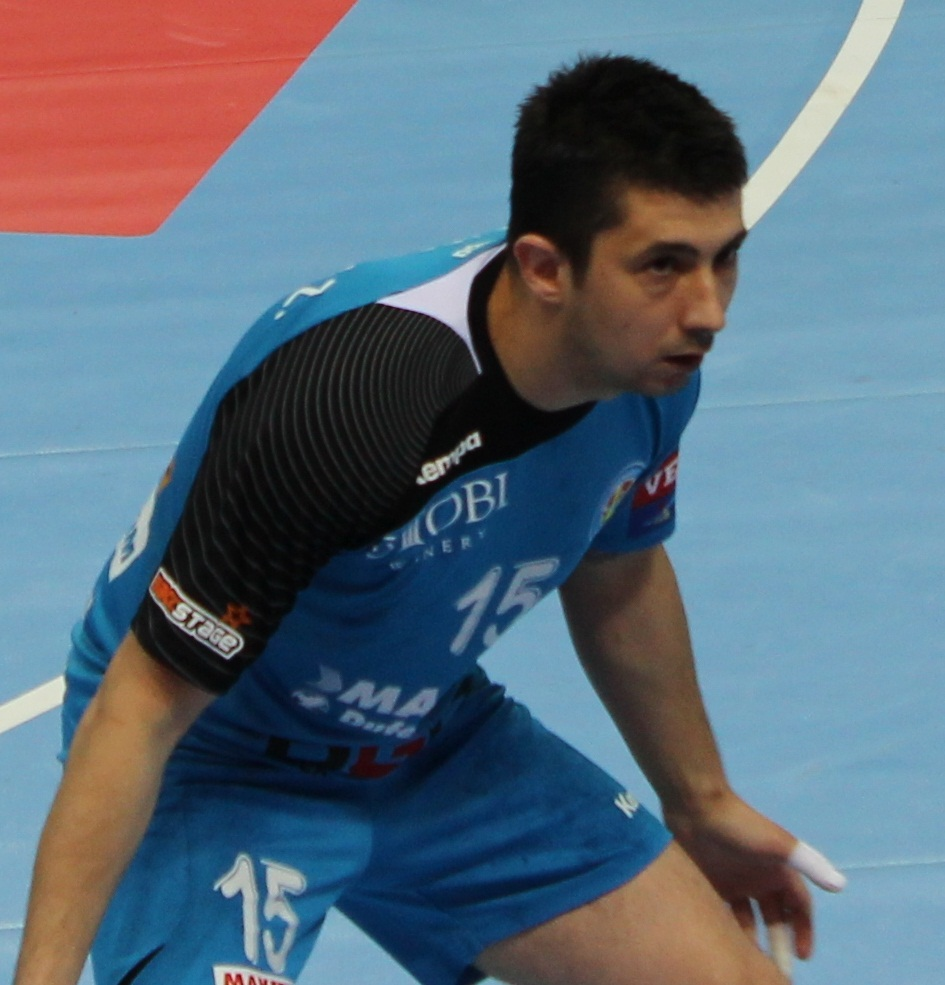

Personal information
- Nationality: Macedonian
- Born: 15 November 1981 (age 44) Struga, SR Macedonia, SFR Yugoslavia
- Height: 1.80 m (5 ft 11 in)

Sport
- Sport: Handball
- Position: Right wing
- Current club: RK Struga
- Number: 15

Senior clubs
- Years: Team
- –: RK Struga Ilinden
- 2001-2005: RK Pelister
- 2005-2006: GRK Ohrid
- 2006-2007: RK VV Tikveš Kavadarci 06
- 2007-2010: RK Vardar PRO
- 2010-2014: RK Metalurg Skopje
- 2014–2015: RK Prilep 2010
- 2015-2016: HC Rabotnichki
- 2016-2018: RK Eurofarm Rabotnik
- 2018-2023: HC Butel Skopje
- 2023-2024: RK Struga
National team
Years	Team	Apps	(Gls)
–	Macedonia	26	(34)

Zlatko Mojsovski (born 15 November 1981) is a Macedonian handball player for RK Struga. He is the younger brother of Naum Mojsovski.

== Honors ==
- Macedonian Handball Super League:

Winner: 2005, 2009,2011 2012, 2014

- Macedonian Handball Cup:

Winner: 2005, 2008,2011, 2013

- SEHA League

Finalist Silver : 2012
3rd Bronze : 2013
