= Kozlina =

Kozlina is a surname. Notable people with the surname include:

- Aleksandar Kozlina (1938–2013), Yugoslav footballer
- Miladin Kozlina (born 1983), Slovenian handball player
