= Stevče Aluševski =

Macedonian handball player

Stevche Alushovski
Personal information
- Nationality: Macedonian
- Born: 1 October 1972 (age 54) Sydney, Australia
- Height: 1.90 m (6 ft 3 in)

Sport
- Sport: Handball
- Position: Left wing
- Current club: RK Eurofarm Pelister (manager)

Senior clubs
- Years: Team
- 1989–1995: RK Pelister
- 1995–1997: Jafa Promet
- 1997–2000: RK Pelister
- 2000–2004: RK Vardar Vatrostalna
- 2004–2005: RK Pelister
- 2005–2010: RK Vardar PRO
- 2010–2013: RK Metalurg Skopje
National team
| Years | Team | Apps | (Gls) |
| 1993–2013 | Macedonia | 245 | (967) |

Teams managed
- 2017–2018: RK Pelister
- 2019: RK Eurofarm Pelister
- 2020–2021: RK Vardar 1961
- 2021–2022: Þór Akureyri
- 2023–2025: GRK Ohrid
- 01/2026–: RK Eurofarm Pelister

Stevche Alushovski (Macedonian: Стевче Алушовски; born 1 October 1972) is a retired Macedonian-Australian handball player and current coach of RK Eurofarm Pelister.

== Career ==
Stevche Alushovski was born in Sydney, Australia, but in his early childhood, he returned to Bitola with his family. His handball career began in Bitola, on the youth team of RK Pelister. At the age of 17, in the 1990/1991 season, he became a first team member at Bitola Club. During his career, he played for: RK Pelister, RK Prespa, RK Vardar PRO, and RK Metalurg Skopje.

He has won the Macedonian First League of Handball 13 times and the Macedonian Handball Cup 11 times.

In 2004, he was named the best handball player in Macedonia.

For the Macedonian national handball team, he played more than 200 matches and scored more than 900 goals. In 2009, he was a member of the team that finished 11th in the 2009 World Men's Handball Championship. Three years later, he played in the 2012 European Men's Handball Championship, where they finished 5th.
