= Petar Angelov (handballer) =

Macedonian handball player

Personal information
- Nationality: Macedonian
- Born: 8 March 1977 (age 49) Kavadarci, SR Macedonia, SFR Yugoslavia
- Height: 1.92 m (6 ft 4 in)

Sport
- Sport: Handball
- Position: Goalkeeper
- Current club: RK Vardar Negotino

Senior clubs
- Years: Team
- 1997–2000: (North Macedonia) RK Tikveš
- 2000–2005: (North Macedonia) RK Pelister
- 2005–2009: Tremblay-en-France
- 2009–2010: (North Macedonia) RK Vardar
- 2010–2013: (North Macedonia) RK Metalurg
- 2013–2017: (North Macedonia) RK Vardar
- 2017–2018: (Turkey) Antalyaspor
- 2018: (Austria) UHK Krems
- 2018–2019: (Germany) SG Ratingen 2011
- 2020–2021: (North Macedonia) RK Tineks Prolet
- 2021–2023: (North Macedonia) RK Vardar Negotino
National team
Years	Team	Apps	(Gls)
2002–2016	Macedonia	138	(7)

Teams managed
- 2022: (North Macedonia) RK Vardar Negotino
- 2023: (North Macedonia) RK Vardar Negotino

Petar Angelov (Macedonian: Петар Ангелов) (born 8 March 1977) is a Macedonian handball player who plays for RK Vardar Negotino.

== Honors ==
- Macedonian Handball Super League (North Macedonia)

Winners Gold (8)
RK Pelister
2000, 2005
RK Metalurg Skopje
2010,2011,2012
RK Vardar
2015,2016,2017

- Macedonian Handball Cup (North Macedonia)

Winners Gold (7)
RK Pelister
2005
RK Metalurg Skopje
2010,2011,2013
RK Vardar
2015,2016,2017

- SEHA League

RK Metalurg Skopje
:Finalist Silver : 2012
RK Metalurg Skopje
:3rd Bronze : 2013
RK Vardar
Winner (2): 2013–14, 2016–17

=== European (European Union) ===
- EHF Challenge Cup

RK Pelister
2nd:: 2001–02

- EHF Champions League

RK Vardar
Winner (1): 2016–17

=== International ===
- IHF Super Globe

RK Vardar
Third placed: 2017
