= Martin Tomovski =

Macedonian handball player

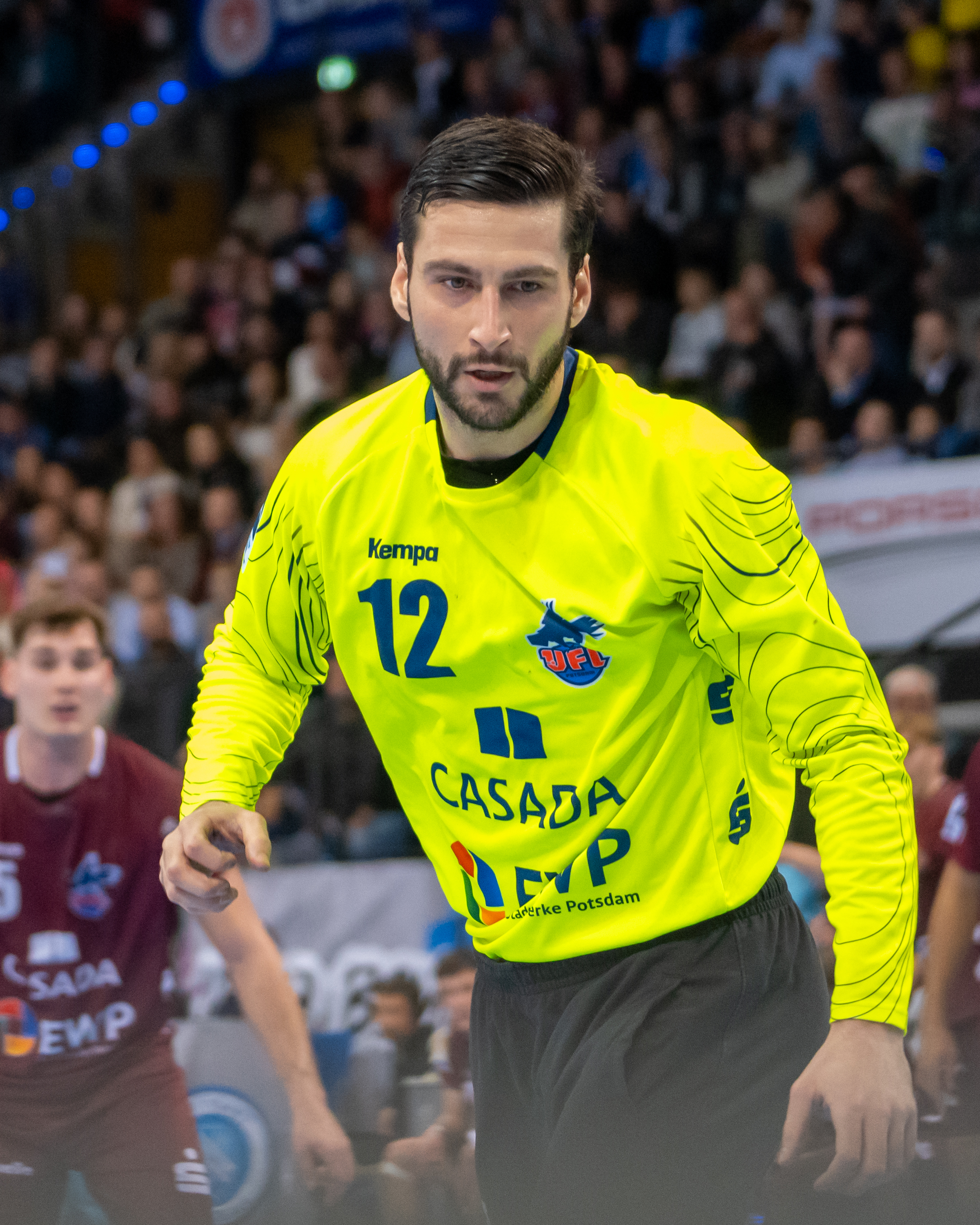

Personal information
- Nationality: Macedonian
- Born: 10 July 1997 (age 29) Skopje, Macedonia
- Height: 1.94 m (6 ft 4 in)

Sport
- Sport: Handball
- Position: Goalkeeper
- Current club: SG BBM Bietigheim
- Number: 12

Senior clubs
- Years: Team
- 2015–2019: RK Metalurg Skopje
- 2016–2017: RK Metalurg II
- 2019–2021: Die Eulen Ludwigshafen
- 2021–2024: RK Vardar 1961
- 2024–2025: 1. VfL Potsdam
- 2025–: SG BBM Bietigheim
National team
Years	Team	Apps	(Gls)
2018–	Macedonia	38	(0)

Martin Tomovski (Macedonian: Мартин Томовски) (born 10 July 1997) is a Macedonian handball player who plays for SG BBM Bietigheim and the Macedonian national team.

He participated at the 2016 Men's Junior European Handball Championship and 2017 Men's Junior World Handball Championship.

He participated at the 2020 European Men's Handball Championship(Austria),2021 World Men's Handball Championship(Egypt),2022 European Men's Handball Championship(Hungary),2023 World Men's Handball Championship(Poland) and 2024 European Men's Handball Championship(Germany).

== Honors ==
- Macedonian Handball Super League

Winner: 2021, 2022

- Macedonian Handball Cup

Winner: 2019,2021,2022 2023

- Super Cup Winner of Macedonia

Winner: 2023
