= Filip Arsenovski =

Macedonian handball player

Personal information
- Nationality: Macedonian
- Born: 30 July 1998 (age 28) Skopje, Macedonia
- Height: 1.93 m (6 ft 4 in)

Sport
- Sport: Handball
- Position: Pivot
- Current club: UHC Hollabrunn
- Number: 99

Youth career
- Years: Team
- –: (North Macedonia) RK Vardar

Senior clubs
- Years: Team
- –2016: (North Macedonia) RK Vardar II
- 2016–2020: (North Macedonia) RK Metalurg Skopje
- 2016–2017: (North Macedonia) RK Metalurg II
- 2020–2023: (North Macedonia) RK Eurofarm Pelister 2
- 2023: (Switzerland) GC Amicitia Zürich
- 2023–2024: (North Macedonia) RK Tineks Prolet
- 2024–: (Austria) UHC Hollabrunn
National team
- Years: Team
- 2019–: Macedonia

Filip Arsenovski (Macedonian: Филип Арсеновски) (born 30 July 1998) is a Macedonian handball player who plays for UHC Hollabrunn.

He participated at the 2017 Men's Junior World Handball Championship.
