= Martin Velkovski =

Macedonian handball player

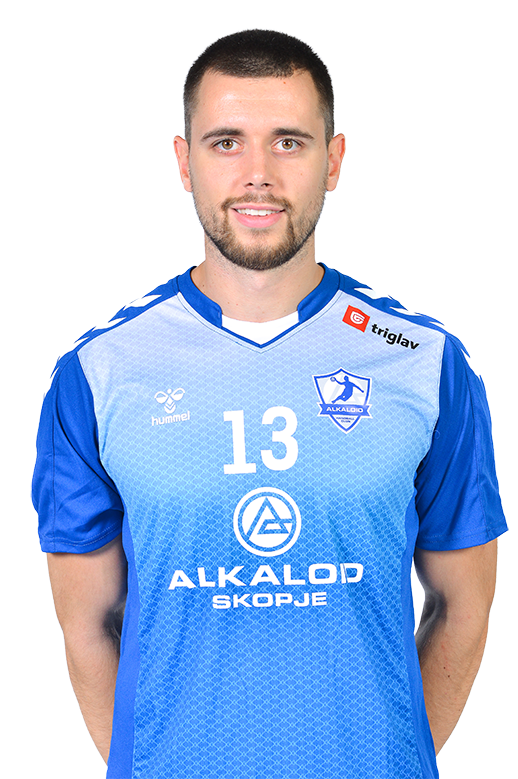

Personal information
- Nationality: Macedonian
- Born: 10 March 1997 (age 29) Skopje, Macedonia
- Height: 1.86 m (6 ft 1 in)

Sport
- Sport: Handball
- Position: Right back
- Current club: RK Alkaloid
- Number: 30

Youth career
- Years: Team
- –: RK Metalurg II

Senior clubs
- Years: Team
- 2015–2019: RK Metalurg Skopje
- 2019–2023: RK Eurofarm Pelister
- 2023–: RK Alkaloid
National team
Years	Team	Apps	(Gls)
2017–	North Macedonia	34	(9)
- Updated on 31. December 2023

Martin Velkovski (Macedonian: Мартин Велковски) (born 10 March 1997) is a Macedonian handball player for RK Alkaloid and the North Macedonia national team.

He participated at the 2017 Men's Junior World Handball Championship.

== Honours ==
RK Metalurg Skopje (North Macedonia)

- Macedonian Handball Cup

Winner (1): 2019
RK Eurofarm Pelister

- Macedonian Handball Super League

Winner(1): 2023

- Macedonian Super Cup

Winner(2): 2021 ,2022

- SEHA League

3rd: 2021–22

RK Alkaloid (North Macedonia)

- Macedonian Handball Cup

Winner (1): 2024

- Macedonian Handball Super Cup

Winner (1): 2024

- EHF European Cup

Winner (1): 2024-25
