= Goran Kuzmanoski =

Macedonian handball player

Personal information
- Nationality: Macedonian
- Born: 30 November 1982 (age 43) Prilep, SR Macedonia, SFR Yugoslavia
- Height: 1.90 m (6 ft 3 in)

Sport
- Sport: Handball
- Position: Centre Back

Youth career
- Years: Team
- 1994–2001: RK Tutunski Kombinat

Senior clubs
- Years: Team
- 2001–2003: RK Tutunski Kombinat
- 2003–2004: RK Vardar Vatrosalna
- 2004–2007: RK Metalurg Skopje
- 2007–2009: Madeira Andebol
- 2009–2011: Tinex Prolet Skopje
- 2011–2018: HC Odorheiu Secuiesc
- 2018–2020: RK Eurofarm Pelister
National team
Years	Team	Apps	(Gls)
–	Macedonia	25	(55)

Teams managed
- 2020–2022: RK Prilep 2010
- 2022–2023: RK Skopje 2020
- 2023–: HC Butel Skopje

Goran Kuzmanoski (born 30 November 1982) is a retired Macedonian handball player.
