= Zharko Peshevski =

Macedonian handball player

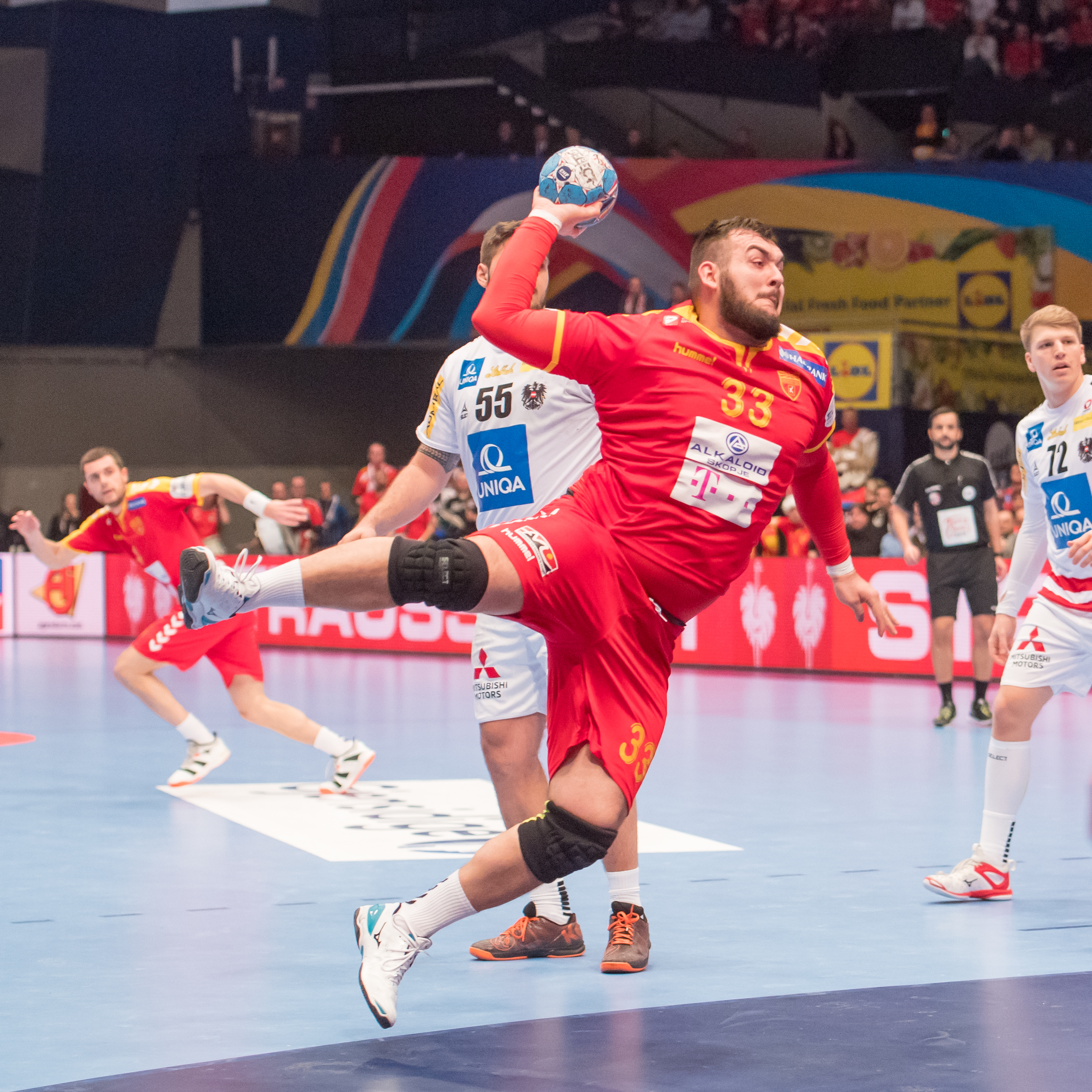

Personal information
- Nationality: Macedonian
- Born: 11 April 1991 (age 35) Skopje, SR Macedonia, SFR Yugoslavia
- Height: 1.95 m (6 ft 5 in)

Sport
- Sport: Handball
- Position: Pivot
- Current club: RK Eurofarm Pelister
- Number: 44

Senior clubs
- Years: Team
- –: RK Metalurg Junior
- 2013–2018: RK Metalurg Skopje
- 2018–2019: HC Motor Zaporizhzhia
- 2019–2022: TVB 1898 Stuttgart
- 2022–: RK Eurofarm Pelister
National team
Years	Team	Apps	(Gls)
2013–	North Macedonia	60	(85)
- Updated on 16. November 2023

Zharko Peshevski (Macedonian: Жарко Пешевски) (born 11 April 1991) is a Macedonian handball player for RK Eurofarm Pelister and the North Macedonia national team.

== Honours ==
- RK Metalurg Skopje
- Macedonian Handball Super League

Winner Gold:2014

- HC Motor Zaporizhzhia
- Ukrainian Men's Handball Super League:
  - Gold:2019
- RK Eurofarm Pelister
- Macedonian Handball Super League

Winner: (2022-23, 2023–24, 2024–25)
