= Martin Marčec =

Croatian handball player (born 1992)

Personal information
- Nationality: Croatian
- Born: November 24, 1992 (age 33) Varaždin, Croatia
- Height: 1.80 m (5 ft 11 in)

Sport
- Sport: Handball
- Position: Left Wing
- Current club: GRK Varaždin
- Number: 73

Senior clubs
- Years: Team
- 2009–2012: (Croatia) RK Varteks
- 2012–2013: (Croatia) RK Vidovec
- 2013–2016: (Croatia) GRK Varaždin
- 2016–2017: (North Macedonia) RK Metalurg Skopje
- 2017–2021: (Germany) SG BBM Bietigheim
- 2021–: (Croatia) GRK Varaždin

Martin Marčec (born 24 November 1992) is a Croatian handball player who plays for GRK Varaždin.
