= Lazo Majnov =

Macedonian handball player

Personal information
- Born: April 26, 1980 (age 46) Skopje, SR Macedonia, SFR Yugoslavia
- Height: 1.98 m (6 ft 6 in)

Sport
- Sport: Handball
- Position: Right Back
- Number: 26

Senior clubs
- Years: Team
- 2001-2003: (North Macedonia) RK Vardar Vatrostalna
- 2003-2005: (Croatia) RK Zagreb
- 2005-2006: Tremblay-en-France
- 2006-2007: (North Macedonia) HC Vadar PRO
- 2007-2008: (Italy) Bologna United
- 2008-2010: (Slovenia) RD Ribnica
- 2010-2011: (North Macedonia) RK Metalurg
- 2011: (Spain) BM Antequera
- 2012: (Belarus) Meshkov Brest
- 2012-2013: (Norway) Elverum Håndball
- 2013-2016: (Romania) HC Odorheiu
- 2016-2017: (North Macedonia) RK Eurofarm Rabotnik
- 2017-2018: (United Arab Emirates) Al-Nasr
National team
Years	Team	Apps	(Gls)
–	Macedonia	56	(91)

Lazo Majnov (Macedonian: Лазо Мајнов) (born 24 April 1980) is a retired Macedonian handball player.
