= Macoviște =

Macovişte (Hungarian: Mákosfalva) may refer to several places in Romania:

- Macovişte, a village in Ciuchici Commune, Caraş-Severin County
- Macovişte, a village in Cornea Commune, Caraş-Severin County

== See also ==
- Macovei (surname)
