= Minčo Jordanov =

Macedonian businessman (born 1944)

- Минчо Јорданов
- Born: 1 July 1944 (age 82); Štip
- Education: Belgrade University
- Occupations: Businessman, politician
- Years active: 1983
- Employer: Makstil AD Skopje

Minčo Jordanov (Macedonian: Минчо Јорданов; born 1 July 1944) is a Macedonian businessman.

== Career ==
He is vice-president of the Economic Chamber of Macedonia.

== Companies ==
- Makstil AD Skopje (Steel factory)
- Remedika (Hospital)
- Nova Makedonija (Newspaper)
- Stobi (Winery)
- AD Beton (Construction)

== Sponsorship ==
- RK Metalurg (General sponsor)
