= Radoslav Stojanović (handball) =

Macedonian handball player and manager (born 1978)

Personal information
- Nationality: Macedonian
- Born: 20 September 1978 (age 48) Titov Veles, SR Macedonia, SFR Yugoslavia
- Height: 1.90 m (6 ft 3 in)

Sport
- Sport: Handball
- Position: Left back
- Current club: RK Ajdovščina (head coach)
National team
- Years: Team
- –: Macedonia

Teams managed
- Years: Team
- 2017–2019: RK Metalurg II
- 2019–2022: GRK Ohrid
- 2022: Qatar SC
- 01/2024–06/2024: GRK Tikveš
- 2024–2025: RK Trimo Trebnje
- 01/2026–: RK Ajdovščina

Radoslav "Rade" Stojanovć (born 20 September 1978) is a retired Macedonian handball player and the current head coach of RK Ajdovščina.
