= 2011 Macedonian Handball Cup =

2011 Cup of Macedonian Handball

Tournament details
- Venue: Sports Hall Mladost (in Bitola host cities)
- Dates: 14 – 15 May
- Teams: 4

Final positions
- Champions: RK Metalurg (4th title)
- Runners-up: RK Pelister

Tournament statistics
- Matches played: 3
- Goals scored: 146 (48.67 per match)

The 2011 Macedonian Handball Cup was the 19th edition of the Macedonian Handball Cup. It took place at the Sports Hall Mladost in Bitola, Republic of Macedonia, on 14 and 15 May 2011. The cup was won by RK Metalurg for the fourth time.

== Venue ==
Bitola
Sports Hall Mladost
Capacity: 5,000
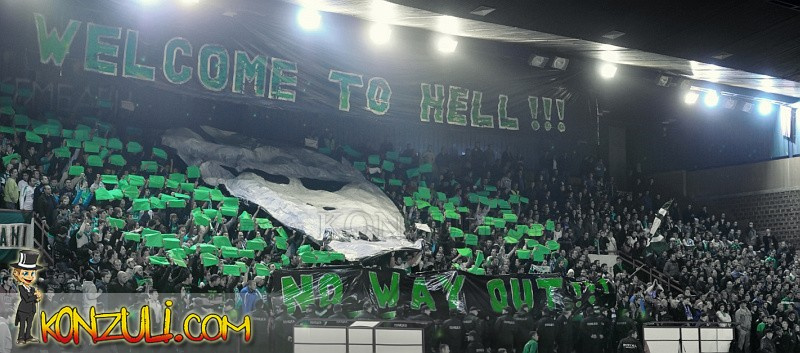

== Knockout stage ==
=== Semifinals ===
14 May, 2011; 17:15 CEST	RK Pelister	32 – 23	RK Borec	Sports Hall Mladost, Bitola
14 May, 2011; 17:15 CEST		(13 - 9)		Sports Hall Mladost, Bitola

14 May, 2011; 19:45 CEST	RK Metalurg	26 - 23	RK Vardar PRO	Sports Hall Mladost, Bitola
14 May, 2011; 19:45 CEST		(10 - 8)		Sports Hall Mladost, Bitola

=== Final ===
15 May, 2011; 16:45 CEST	RK Metalurg	22 – 20	RK Pelister	Sports Hall Mladost, Bitola
15 May, 2011; 16:45 CEST	Mojsovski, 9	(10 – 14)		Sports Hall Mladost, Bitola

2011 Macedonian Handball Cup Winners
RK Metalurg
4th Title

== See also ==
- Macedonian Handball Cup
