= Vancho Dimovski =

Macedonian handball player

Vančo Dimovski
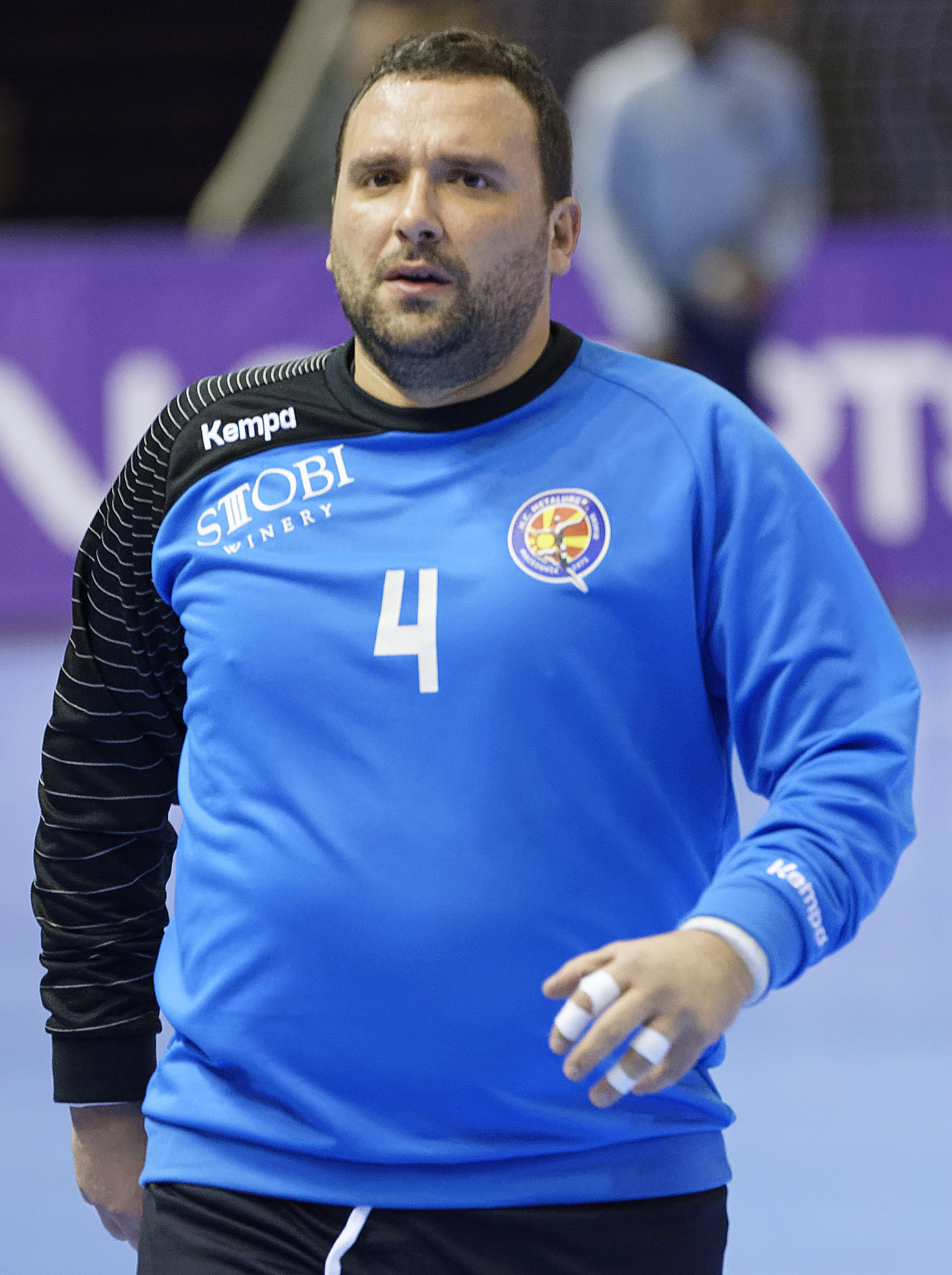

Personal information
- Nationality: Macedonian
- Born: 4 April 1979 (age 47) Skopje, SR Macedonia, SFR Yugoslavia
- Height: 1.87 m (6 ft 2 in)

Sport
- Sport: Handball
- Position: Pivot
- Current club: Retired
- Number: 4

Senior clubs
- Years: Team
- 1999-2004: RK Vardar Vatrostalna
- 2004-2005: RK Pelister
- 2005-2006: RK Metalurg Skopje
- 2006-2007: RK Gold Club Kozina
- 2007-2014: RK Metalurg Skopje
National team
Years	Team	Apps	(Gls)
–	Macedonia	79	(203)

Vancho Dimovski (born 4 April 1979) is a former Macedonian handball player and former member of the Macedonian national team. In 2015 he became a sports director for HC Rabotnichki, but in February 2016 he left Rabotnichki and became a team-manager at RK Metalurg Skopje.
