= Branislav Angelovski =

Macedonian handball player

Personal information
- Nationality: Macedonian
- Born: 21 February 1977 (age 49) Bitola, SR Macedonia, SFR Yugoslavia
- Height: 1.92 m (6 ft 4 in)

Sport
- Sport: Handball
- Position: Central back

Senior clubs
- Years: Team
- 1997-2000: (North Macedonia) RK Vardar Vatrostalna
- 2000-2001: (North Macedonia) RK Tineks Prolet
- 2001-2002: (Croatia) Badel 1862 Zagreb
- 2002-2003: (Switzerland) Pfadi Winterthur
- 2003-2004: (Croatia) RK Zagreb
- 2004-2005: (North Macedonia) RK Pelister
- 2005-2007: (North Macedonia) RK Metalurg Skopje
- 2007-2008: (France) Fenix Toulouse
- 2008-2009: (United Arab Emirates) HC Al Ain
- 2009-2010: (North Macedonia) RK Vardar PRO
- 2010-2015: (Romania) H.C.M. Constanța
- 2015-2017: (Romania) HC Dobrogea Sud
National team
Years	Team	Apps	(Gls)
–	Macedonia	159	(392)

Teams managed
- 2021–2023: North Macedonia (assistant)
- 2022–2023: RK Multi Essence
- 2023–2024: RK Eurofarm Pelister

Branislav Angelovski (Macedonian: Бранислав Ангеловски) (born 21 February 1977) is a former Macedonian handball player who last played for HC Dobrogea Sud Constanța, and also played for the Macedonian national handball team.
