= Florin Macovei =

Romanian footballer

Personal information
- Date of birth: 12 January 1987 (age 39)
- Place of birth: Piatra Neamț, Romania
- Position: Midfielder

Youth career
- Ceahlăul Piatra Neamț

Senior career*
Years	Team	Apps	(Gls)
2006–2010	Ceahlăul Piatra Neamț	2	(0)
- * Club domestic league appearances and goals as of 25 February 2018

Florin Macovei (born 12 January 1987) is a Romanian former footballer who played in Liga I for Ceahlăul Piatra Neamț.
