= Miladin Kozlina =

Slovenian handball player

Personal information
- Nationality: Slovenian
- Born: 11 February 1983 (age 43) Celje, SFR Yugoslavia
- Height: 1.98 m (6 ft 6 in)

Sport
- Sport: Handball
- Position: Left back
- Current club: HC Rhein Vikings
- Number: 5

Senior clubs
- Years: Team
- 2003–2011: RK Celje
- 2011: Frisch Auf Göppingen
- 2011–2013: RK Metalurg Skopje
- 2013–2014: RK Vardar
- 2014–2017: GWD Minden
- 2017–2019: HC Rhein Vikings
- 2019–: Wilhelmshavener HV
National team
Years	Team	Apps	(Gls)
–	Slovenia	117	(236)

Miladin Kozlina (born 11 February 1983) is a Slovenian handball player who plays for Wilhelmshavener HV.
