= Naumče Mojsovski =

Macedonian handball player

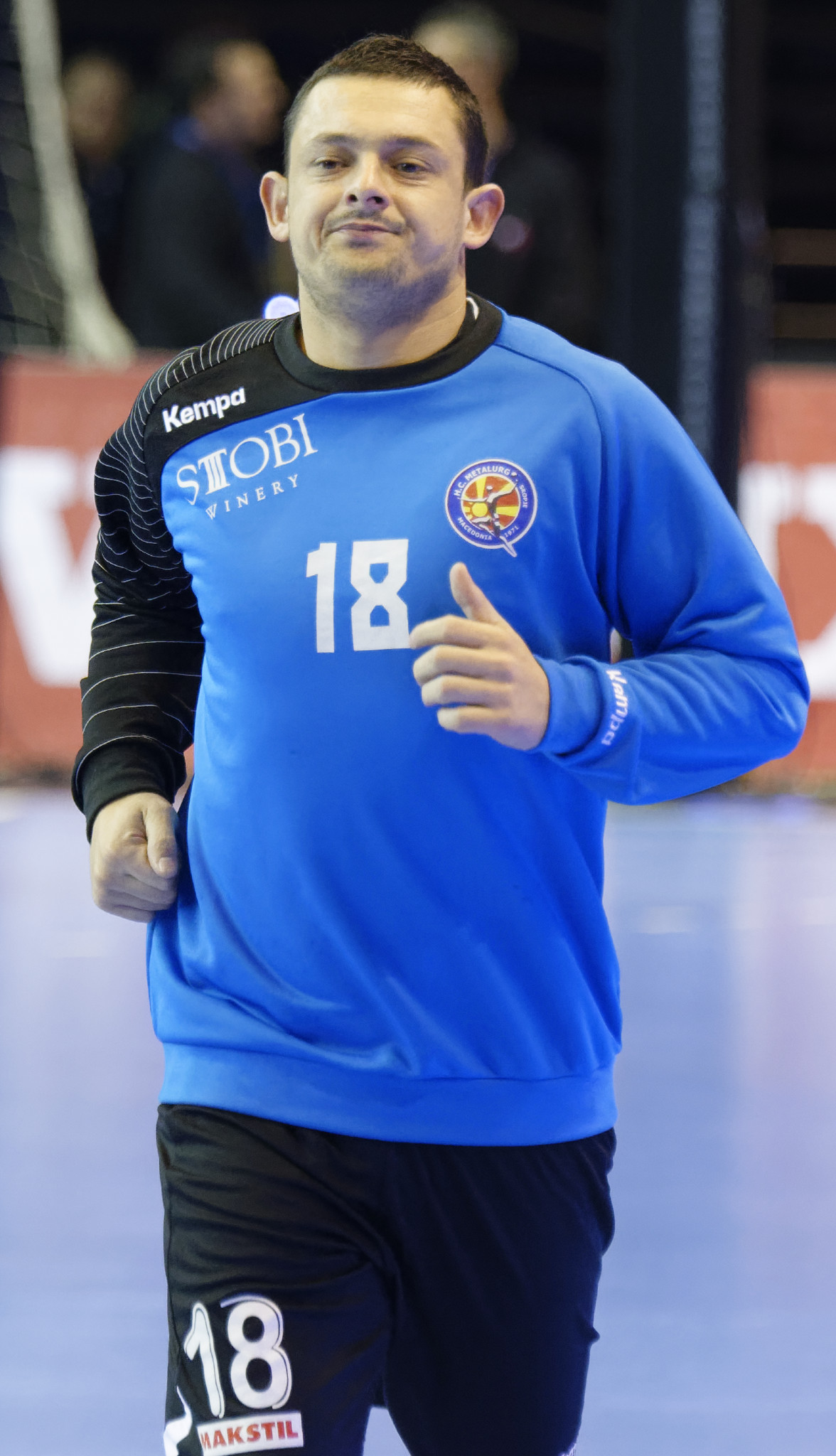

Personal information
- Nationality: Macedonian
- Born: 17 June 1980 (age 46) Struga, SR Macedonia, SFR Yugoslavia
- Height: 1.87 m (6 ft 1 1/2 in)

Sport
- Sport: Handball
- Position: Centre back

Senior clubs
- Years: Team
- 1996–2000: RK Struga Ilinden
- 2000–2003: RK Pelister
- 2003: RK Jug
- 2003–2005: RK Pelister
- 2005–2007: RK Vardar PRO
- 2007–2008: La Rioja
- 2008–2009: RK Vardar PRO
- 2009–2014: RK Metalurg Skopje
- 2015: Lekhwiya SC
- 2015–2016: CSM București
National team
Years	Team	Apps	(Gls)
1998–2016	Macedonia	108	(163)

Naumče Mojsovski (Macedonian: Наумче Мојсовски) (born 17 June 1980) is a former Macedonian handball player. He is the older brother of Zlatko Mojsoski

== Honors ==
- Macedonian Handball Super League:

Winner: 2005, 2009, 2010, 2011, 2012, 2014

- Macedonian Handball Cup:

Winner: 2005, 2007, 2010, 2011, 2013

- Cupa României
  - Winners: 2016
- SEHA League

Finalist Silver : 2012
3rd Bronze : 2013
