= RK Metalurg Skopje =

Macedonian handball club

- Full name: Rakometen klub Metalurg Skopje
- Founded: 1971; 55 years ago
- Arena: Avtokomanda; Boris Trajkovski
- Capacity: 2,000; 7,000
- President: Zorica Molkoska Blazhevska
- Head coach: Martin Burchevski, Goran Pechenkovski
- League: Macedonian Handball Super League
- 2023–24: Macedonian Handball First League, 5th of 15
- Club colours
Home	Away

RK Metalurg Skopje (Macedonian: РК Металург Скопје) is a Macedonian handball club based in Skopje. They compete in the domestic Macedonian Handball First League, and have competed in the EHF Champions League.

The club also has a football and a basketball team.

== History ==
The club was founded in 1971 under patronage of the Skopje steel industry. There, an idea was born to form a team composed of employees that worked in the nearby steel mill. Nikola Bogdanovski accepted the idea after it was reviewed by the board of directors. Thus, RK Metalurg was created. The same concept realized by Bogdanovski continues to live today. At the time, the club didn't even think of playing in any of the European competitions, because they played their best not to be relegated from the first league. It's well worth mentioning that Metalurg in its first official match won against the team of RK Pirin with a score of 22–14. In 1974 the club created a youth team, led by Kreshnik Pustina. In the following two decades, this youth team would constitute the core of the club. The first European debut for Metalurg was in 1993, when they played in the EHF City Cup, where their opponent was Belgian HC Herstal Liège. Currently, Metalurg is the best handball club in the country, and in the last five years, they've won the first league championship three times, as well as becoming national cup winners. The team regularly participates in the best European handball competitions and is currently considered as a club - national team. Macedonian national team.

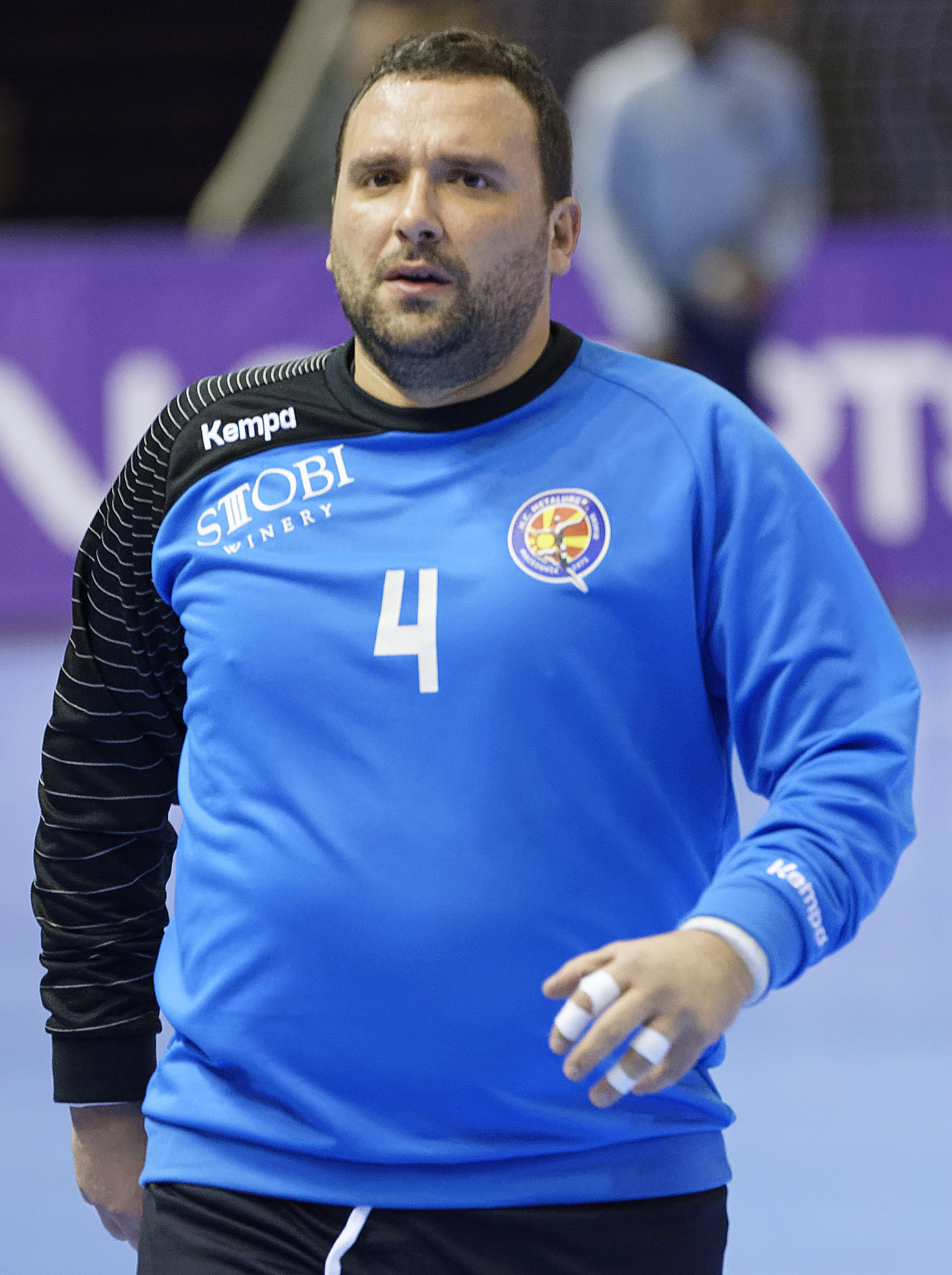
Dinamite Pivot Ivan Dimovski

== Golden Years ==
Lino Cervar era are the golden years of Metalurg, winning championships and cup trophies. Best season in Europe and Champions league happened under Lino Cervars management of the team from Avtokomanda.

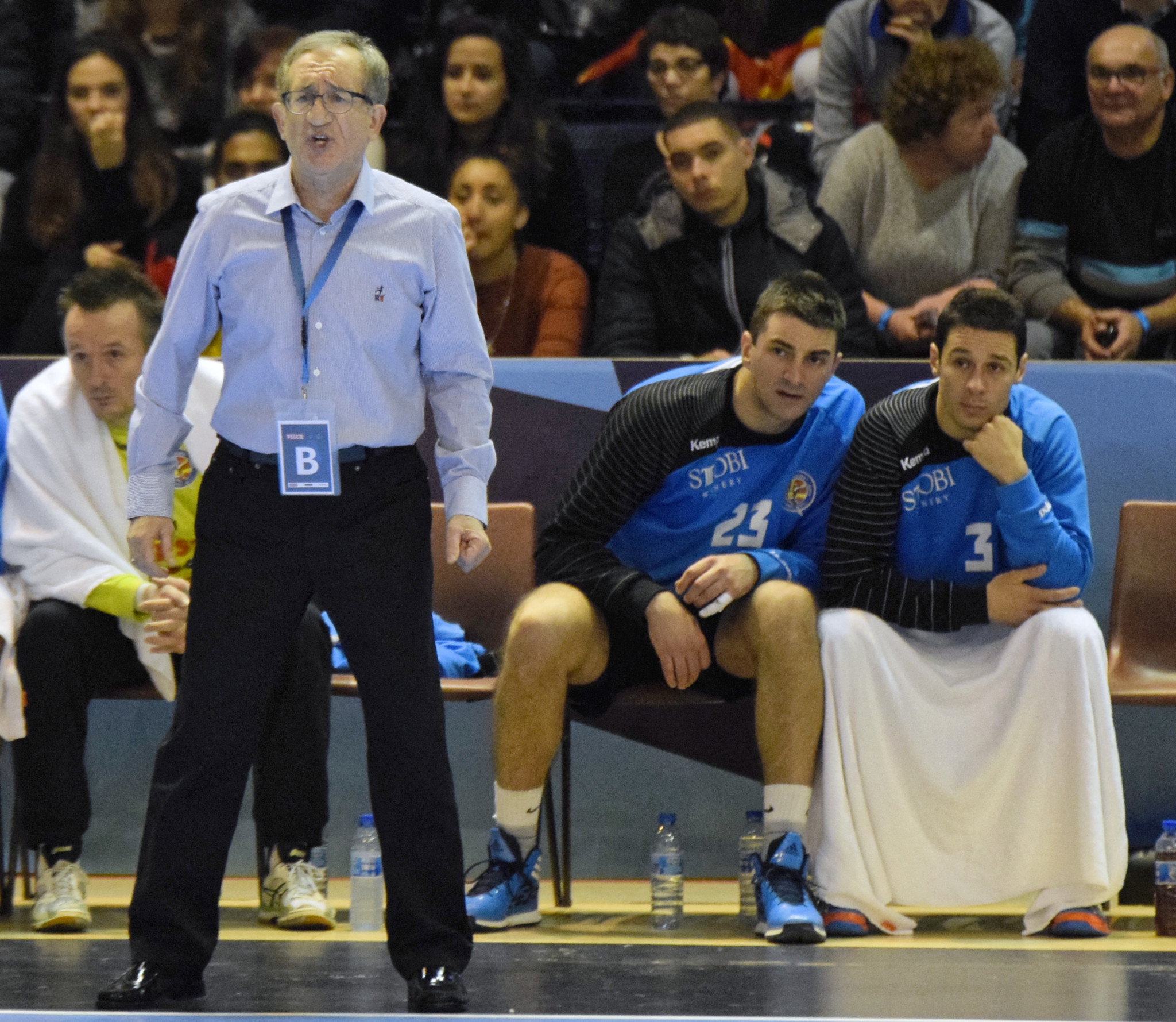
Lino Cervar Metalurgs Legendary Menager

In the 2011–12 season, Metalurg made it to the Last 16 of the EHF Champions League where they lost to Croatia Osiguranje Zagreb. The following season they made history, becoming the first Macedonian men's handball club to reach the EHF Champions League quarterfinals. In the 2013–14 season, they repeated their success by reaching the EHF Champions League quarterfinals for the second time in a row.

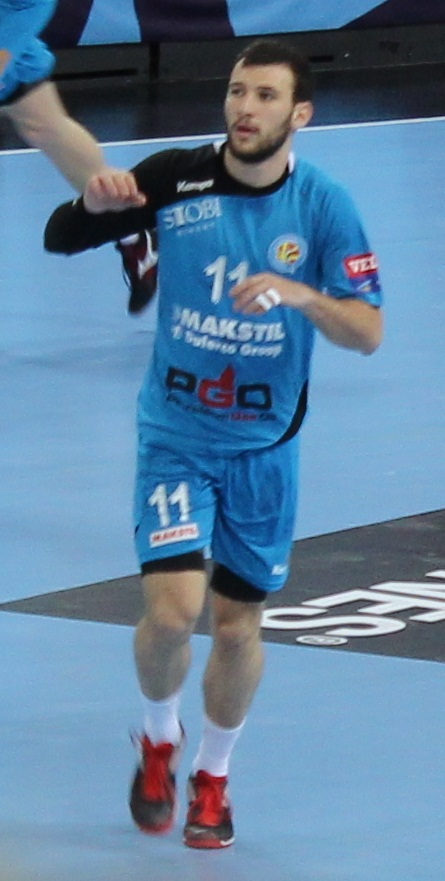
Super star winger Dejan Manaskov

In the 2014–2015 season there were misunderstandings in the club and financial problems. At the beginning of November there were misunderstandings between the coach Lino Červar and the players, so they didn't want to play under his command. Because of that they were suspended by the management of the club. They came back so they wouldn't be eliminated from the EHF Champions League.

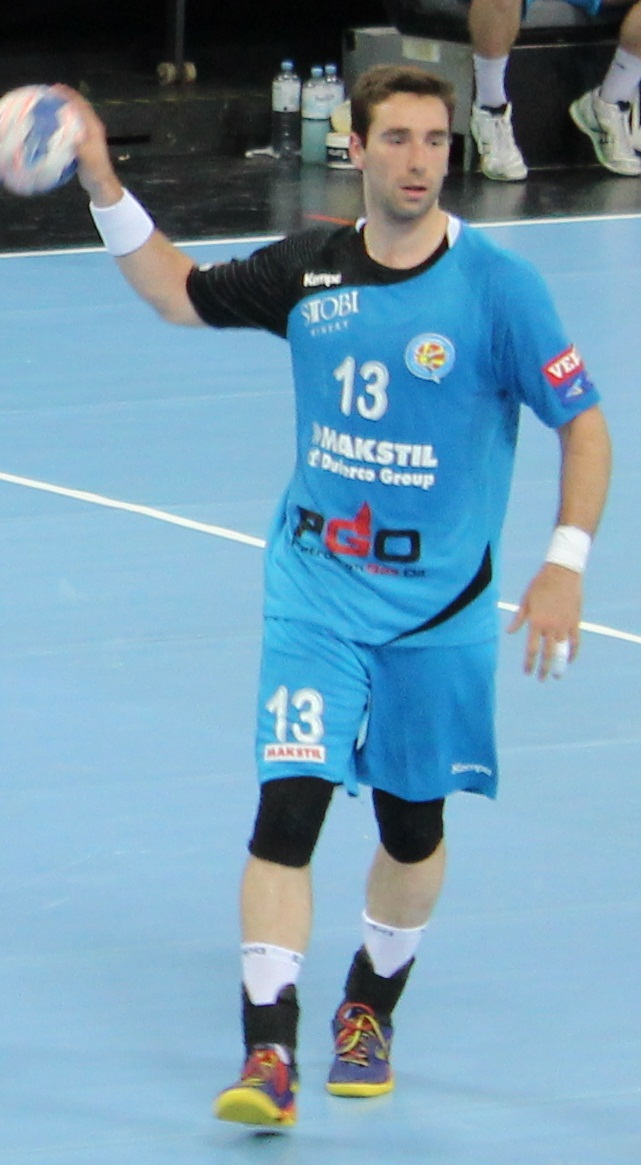
Top Flight Playmaker Filip Mirkulovski

But in the time of the crisis 7 players left the club: Stanić, Kocić, Marsenić, Borozan, Cindrić, Atman, Lipovina. As the crisis continued in 2015, 9 more players left the club: Mojsovski, Jonovski, V.Markoski, N.Markoski, Vugrinec, Mirkulovski, Dimovski, Manaskov, Georgievski. The management of the club decided to temporarily pull the shirt number 13, which in the previous 12 years wore Mirkulovski. In continuation of the season, "Metalurg" continued to play with reserve, mostly made up of young players.

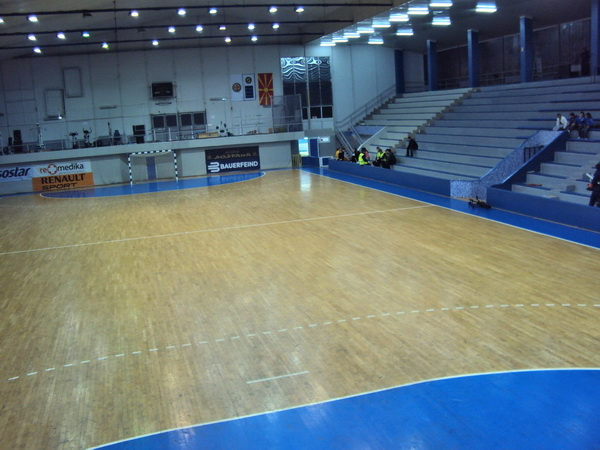
Avtokomanda Hall

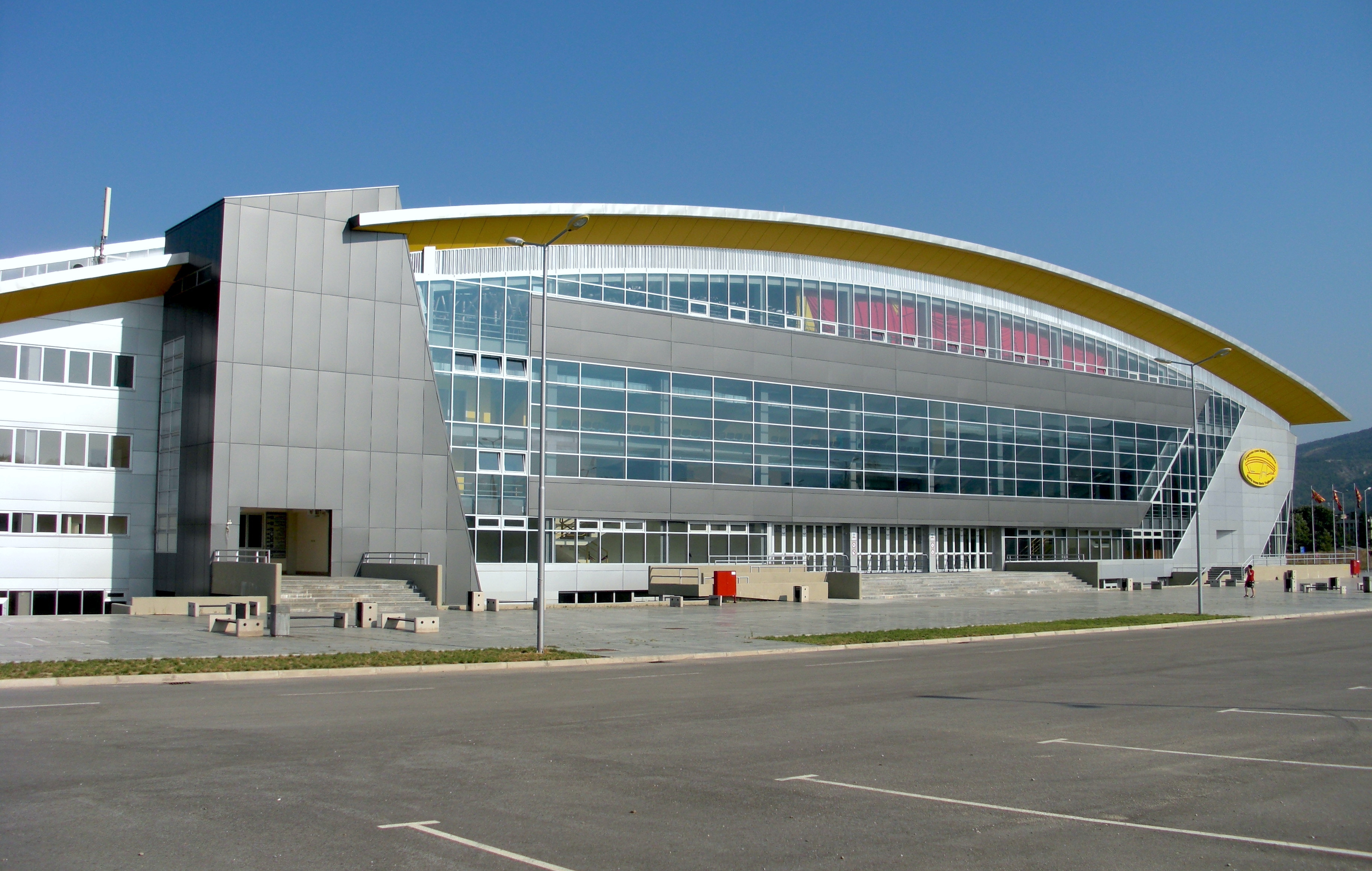
Trajkovski Arena

Season 2018-2019 was marked as an Extraordinary. The Metulurg Squad played on 4 fronts with a combined team and many new young players. Despite finishing third in the League and failing to qualify for the SEHA League playoffs, the team competed in the Macedonian Handball Cup 2019, reaching the Final 4. In the semifinals, they defeated HC Butel Skopje and FK Vardar. The final match ended with tie 29–29, ending the match with penalties.

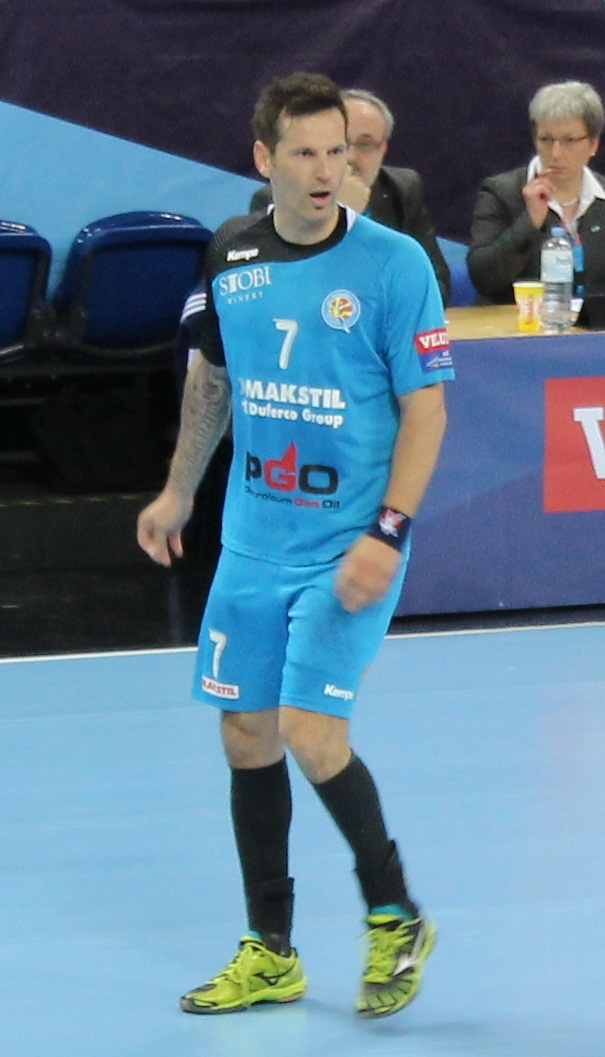
Killer Bombardier Renato Vugrinec VUGI

== Home Ground ==
RK Metalurg Skopje has its own home arena in Avtokomanda with a capacity of 1,200 seats, that is where they play their domestic matches. Before the construction of its sports center, RK Metalurg played their European Cup matches at SRC Kale. In the 2008–09 season, Metalurg started playing the EHF Champions League matches at the Boris Trajkovski arena, where the average attendance was about 5,000 people.

== Trophies ==
- Champions (North Macedonia)

Winners Gold :1980, 1986, 1992, 2006, 2008, 2010, 2011, 2012, 2014, 2020

- Cups (North Macedonia)

Winners Gold (6): 2006, 2009, 2010, 2011, 2013, 2019

- SEHA League

Finalist Silver : 2012
3rd Bronze : 2013

- Double

Winners (3): 2005–06, 2009–10, 2010–11

== European record ==
- EHF Cup Winners' Cup (European Union)

2005-06 Eight-Finals Last 16
2008-09 Quarter-finals best 8
2009-10 Eight-Finals Last 16

- EHF Challenge Cup (European Union)

1993–94 Eight-Finals Last 16
1994–95 Round 2
2001–02 Round 2

- EHF Cup (European Union)

2003–04 Round 3
2004–05 Round 3
2007–08 Quarter-finals best 8
2010–11 Eight-Finals best 16
2019–20 play-off
2020–21 Group Stage

- EHF Champions League (European Union)

2006–07 group stage
2008–09 group stage
2011–12 Eight-Finals best 16
2012–13 Quarter-finals best 8
2013–14 Quarter-finals best 8
2014–15 group stage
2015–16 group stage
2016-17 group stage
2017–18 Group stage
2018–19 Group stage

== Kits ==
HOME
2014–15	2016–18

AWAY

2016–17

== Team ==
=== Current squad ===
Squad for the 2024–25 season

RK Metalurg

Goalkeepers

- (North Macedonia) Nikola Angelovski
- (North Macedonia) Petar Stojanovski
- (North Macedonia) Martin Stojchevski

Players

Left Wingers

- (North Macedonia) Kosta Nikolovski
- (North Macedonia) Branko Josifovski
- (North Macedonia) Jovan Bozhinovski

Right Wingers

- (North Macedonia) Matej Filipovski
- (North Macedonia) Dimitar Brzachki

Line players

- (North Macedonia) Jakov Panovski (C)
- (North Macedonia) Kristijan Nikolovski
- (North Macedonia) Kristijan Angjelkovski

Left Backs

- (North Macedonia) Filip Petrovski (VC)
- (North Macedonia) Andrej Krstevski

Central Backs

- (North Macedonia) Goran Pechenkovski
- (North Macedonia) Bojan Popovski
- (North Macedonia) Luka Savovski
- (North Macedonia) Leon Kochov
- (North Macedonia) Aleksandar Veljanoski

Right Backs

- (North Macedonia) Dimitar Ristovski
- (North Macedonia) Dzulijano Hristovski

== Staff ==
=== Professional staff ===
Position	Name
Head coach	(North Macedonia) Martin Burchevski
Assistant coach	(North Macedonia) Goran Pechenkovski
Goalkeeper coach	(North Macedonia) Aleksandra Kuzmanovska

=== Management ===
Position	Name
Owner	(North Macedonia) Minčo Jordanov
President	(North Macedonia) Zorica Blaževska

== Former club members ==
=== Notable former players ===
- (North Macedonia) Filip Taleski
- (North Macedonia) Martin Manaskov
- (North Macedonia) Dejan Manaskov
- (North Macedonia) Borjan Madzovski
- (North Macedonia) Petar Misovski
- (North Macedonia) Nikola Mitrevski
- (North Macedonia) Goce Ojleski
- (North Macedonia) Milorad Kukoski
- (North Macedonia) Renato Vugrinec
- (North Macedonia) Filip Mirkulovski
- (North Macedonia) Goran Krstevski
- (North Macedonia) Goran Kuzmanoski
- (North Macedonia) Lazo Majnov
- (North Macedonia) Marko Neloski
- (North Macedonia) Kostadin Petrov
- (North Macedonia) Darko Dimitrievski
- (North Macedonia) Filip Kuzmanovski
- (North Macedonia) Dimitar Dimitrioski
- (North Macedonia) Bojan Madzovski
- (North Macedonia) Martin Velkovski
- (North Macedonia) Mario Tankoski
- (North Macedonia) Filip Arsenovski
- (North Macedonia) Mice Šilegov
- (North Macedonia) Daniel Gjorgjeski
- (North Macedonia) Martin Serafimov
- (North Macedonia) Stojanče Stoilov
- (North Macedonia) Velko Markoski
- (North Macedonia) Nikola Markoski
- (North Macedonia) Borko Ristovski
- (North Macedonia) Goce Georgievski
- (North Macedonia) Filip Lazarov
- (North Macedonia) Aco Jonovski
- (North Macedonia) Kiril Kolev
- (North Macedonia) Stevče Aluševski
- (North Macedonia) Vančo Dimovski
- (North Macedonia) Goran Gjorgonoski
- (North Macedonia) Petar Angelov
- (North Macedonia) Naumče Mojsovski
- (North Macedonia) Branislav Angelovski
- (North Macedonia) Zlatko Mojsovski
- (North Macedonia) Nikola Kosteski
- (North Macedonia) Stefan Drogrishki
- (North Macedonia) Žarko Peševski
- (North Macedonia) Davor Palevski
- (North Macedonia) Martin Tomovski
- (North Macedonia) Nikola Danilovski
- (North Macedonia) Tomislav Jagurinovski
- (North Macedonia) Dejan Pecakovski
- (North Macedonia) Mihajlo Mladenovikj
- (North Macedonia) Milan Lazarevski
- (North Macedonia) Daniel Dupjačanec
- (Serbia) Aleksandar Stojanović (handballer)
- (Serbia) Darko Stanić
- (Serbia) Darko Arsić
- (Serbia) Đorđe Golubović
- (Serbia) Janja Vojvodić
- (Serbia) Miloš Dragaš
- (Serbia) Darko Đukić
- (Serbia) Vojislav Brajović
- (Serbia) Nemanja Obradović
- (Serbia) Nemanja Mladenović
- (Serbia) Predrag Vejin
- (Serbia) Vanja Ilić
- (Serbia) Aleksandar Gugleta
- (Serbia) Luka Stojanović
- (Serbia) Nikola Potić
- (Serbia) Momir Rnić
- (Serbia) Stefan Dodić
- (Croatia) Luka Mrakovčić
- (Croatia) Marko Buvinić
- (Croatia) Luka Cindrić
- (Croatia) Marko Matić
- (Croatia) Martin Marčec
- (Croatia) Halil Jaganjac
- (Croatia) Adrian Miličević
- (Croatia) Ante Tokić
- (Croatia) Marijan Marić
- (Croatia) Zlatko Horvat
- (Montenegro) Mladen Rakčević
- (Montenegro) Stevan Vujović
- (Montenegro) Rade Mijatović
- (Montenegro) Vuko Borozan
- (Montenegro) Božo Anđelić
- (Montenegro) Luka Vujović
- (Montenegro) Branko Kankaraš
- (Montenegro) Milan Popović
- (Montenegro) Vasilije Kaluđerović
- (Slovenia) Januš Lapajne
- (Slovenia) David Špiler
- (Slovenia) Miladin Kozlina
- (Slovenia) Aleksander Špende
- (Slovenia) Miha Pučnik
- (Bosnia and Herzegovina) Damir Efendić
- (Bosnia and Herzegovina) Kemal Fazlić
- (Bosnia and Herzegovina) Dragan Vrgoč
- (Bosnia and Herzegovina) Marko Tarabochia
- (Qatar) Milan Šajin
- (Qatar) Žarko Marković
- (Austria) Janko Božović
- (Russia) Pavel Atman
- (Iran) Amin Yusefinezhad
- (Georgia (country)) Revaz Chanturia
- (Georgia (country)) Irakli Kbilashvili
- (Portugal) Gonçalo Ribeiro
- (Portugal) Ulisses Ribeiro
- (France) Abdoulah Mané
- (Turkey) Halil Öztürk

=== Notable former coaches ===
- (Serbia) Jovica Cvetković
- (North Macedonia) Zvonko Šundovski
- (Croatia) Lino Červar

== Statistics ==
=== All–time Top 10 Scorers in the EHF Champions League ===
As of 2018–19 season

Rank	Name	Seasons	Goals
1	(North Macedonia) Naumče Mojsovski	4	213
2	(North Macedonia) Renato Vugrinec	3	194
3	(North Macedonia) Filip Mirkulovski	6	133
4	(North Macedonia) Dejan Manaskov	4	106
5	(North Macedonia) Goce Georgievski	6	96
6	(North Macedonia) Vančo Dimovski	5	86
7	(Croatia) Halil Jaganjac	2	84
8	(North Macedonia) Žarko Peševski	7	75
9	(Austria) Janko Božović	1	71
10	(Qatar) Žarko Marković	1	62
10	(Montenegro) Mladen Rakčević	2	62

=== Most appearances in the EHF Champions League ===
As of 2018–19 season

Rank	Name	Seasons	Appearances
1	(North Macedonia) Filip Mirkulovski	6	55
2	(North Macedonia) Vančo Dimovski	5	51
3	(North Macedonia) Goce Georgievski	6	50
4	(North Macedonia) Velko Markoski	4	46
4	(North Macedonia) Aco Jonovski	4	46
6	(North Macedonia) Dejan Manaskov	4	42
7	(North Macedonia) Naumče Mojsovski	4	41
7	(Serbia) Darko Stanić	4	41
9	(North Macedonia) Martin Velkovski	5	38
10	(North Macedonia) Zlatko Mojsoski	3	36
10	(North Macedonia) Žarko Peševski	7	36
