= Bogdan Macovei =

Bogdan Macovei may refer to:

- Bogdan Macovei (handball coach) (1953–2021), a Romanian handball manager.
- Bogdan Macovei (luger) (born 1983), a Romanian-born Moldovan luger.
