= North Macedonia men's national handball team =

North Macedonia
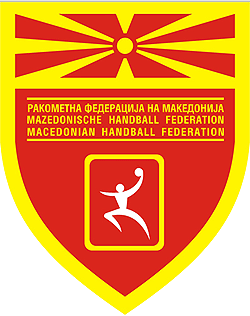

Information
- Nickname: Red-Yellow Tanks
- Association: Macedonian Handball Federation
- Coach: Kiril Lazarov
- Assistant coach: Ninoslav Pavelić; Stojanče Stoilov; Naum Taneski
- Most caps: Stevče Aluševski (245)
- Most goals: Kiril Lazarov (1717)

Colours
1st	2nd	3rd

Results

World Championship
- Appearances: 9 (First in 1999)
- Best result: 9th (2015)

European Championship
- Appearances: 9 (First in 1998)
- Best result: 5th (2012)
- Last updated on Unknown.

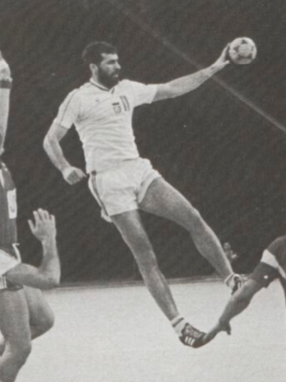
Slobodan Kuzmanovski scored 400 goals for Yugoslavia

The North Macedonia national handball team is the national handball team of North Macedonia. The team is run by the Macedonian Handball Federation, the governing body of handball in North Macedonia. Prior to joining the International Handball Federation in 1991 as an independent country, North Macedonia was represented within the Yugoslavia men's national handball team.

== History ==
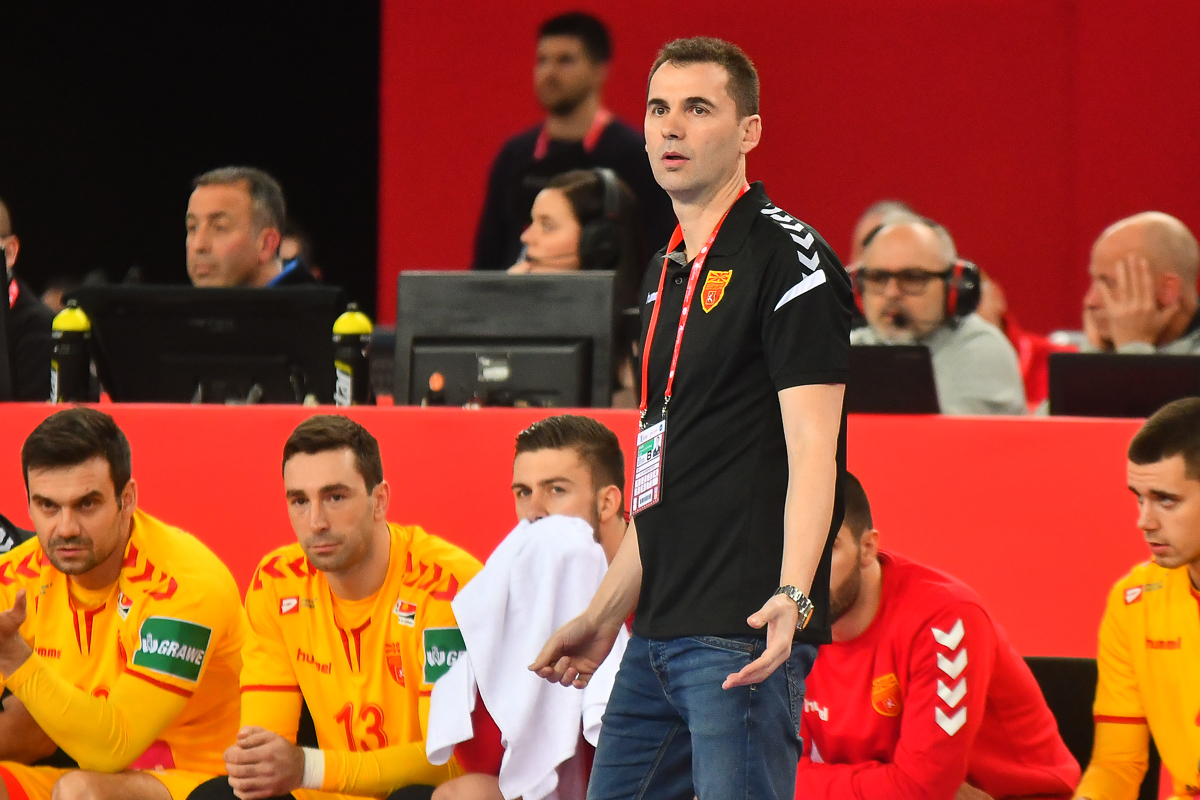
Macedonian bench at EURO 2018

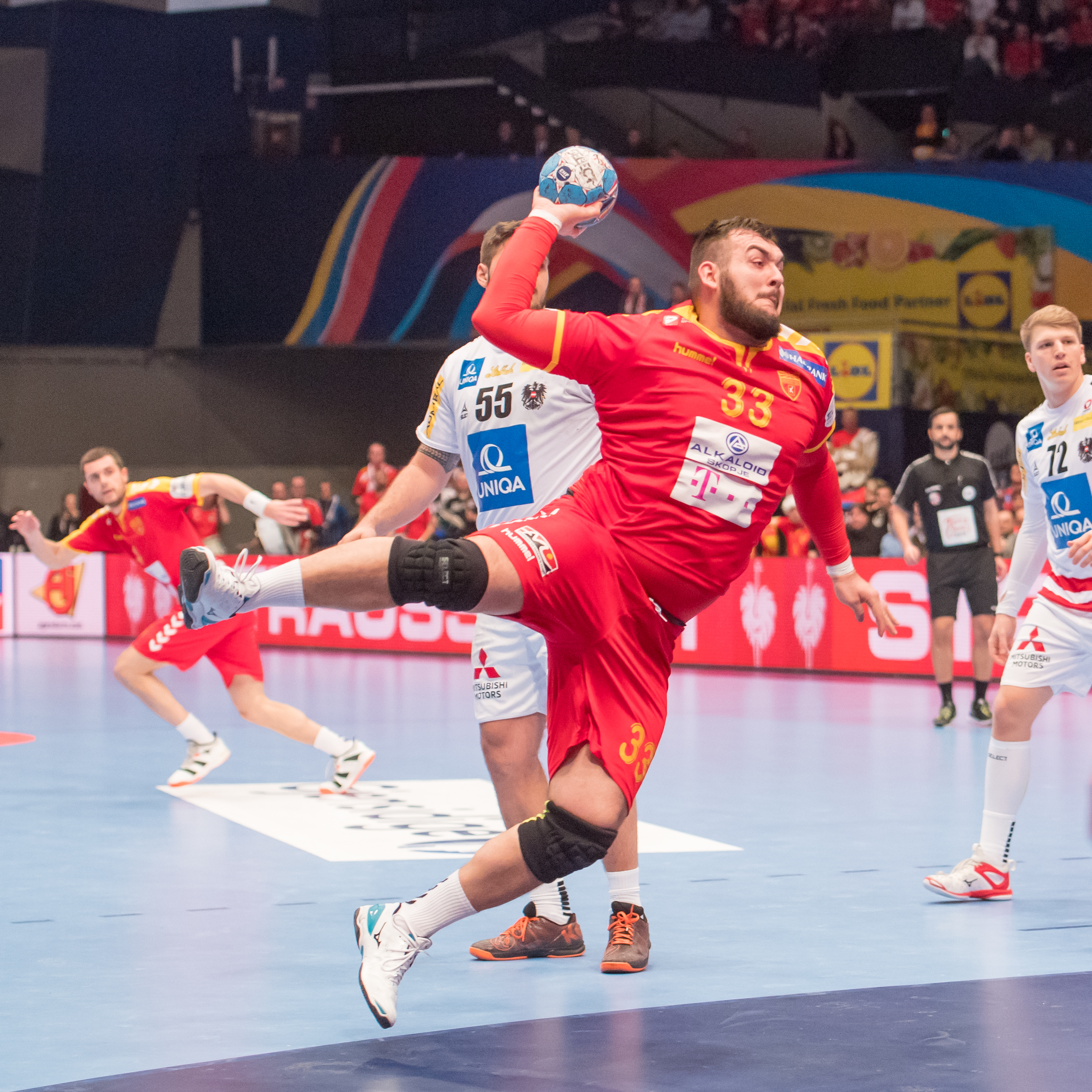
Macedonian team attacking at EURO 2020

- First Handball teams in Macedonia emerged in the second half of the 1940s. Soon Macedonian Handball federation started to organize national championships in big handball −11 players on a soccer field size. By the '60s it was transformed into small handball or indoor handball. Macedonian champions were qualified for federal Yugoslav Championship instead of European cup competitions. The best Macedonian players played for the Federal team of Yugoslavia. In the time of the federation, 6 of the constitutional republics were sending one federal team to compete at the Olympics and World cup. Macedonia was participating within the federal team from 1950 till 1991. During that time was present at the 5 Olympics and 10 World cup tournaments within the successful team of Yugoslavia.
- After the split of the federation, as a single republic from 1992 till 1994 Macedonia did not manage to enter the qualifications for EC, WC and OG. At the World cup 1993 only teams from the Olympics qualified so the Macedonian team did not have a chance to qualify. From 1995 Macedonia participates as a single Republic to all qualifications and Championship tournaments.
- European Championship For the first European Championship 1994 team Macedonia did not enter the qualifications. Since EURO 1996 team Macedonia is regular in the qualifications. It entered 9 European Championships first one in 1998 then 2012, 2014, 2016, 2018, 2020, 2022, 2024 and 2026. Most successful was the 2012 when they've finished 5th.
- World Cup For the World cup 1995 only teams from EURO 1994 qualified so again team Macedonian did not get a chance to participate. At the World Cup's they entered 9 times – 1999, 2009, 2013, 2015, 2017, 2019, 2021, 2023 and 2025. The most successful was in 2015 when they finished 9th.
- Olympics For the Olympic tournament qualifications they have entered two times – 2012 finishing 4th and 2016 finishing 3rd. They did not manage to finish in the first two spots and have not qualified.

== Home ground ==
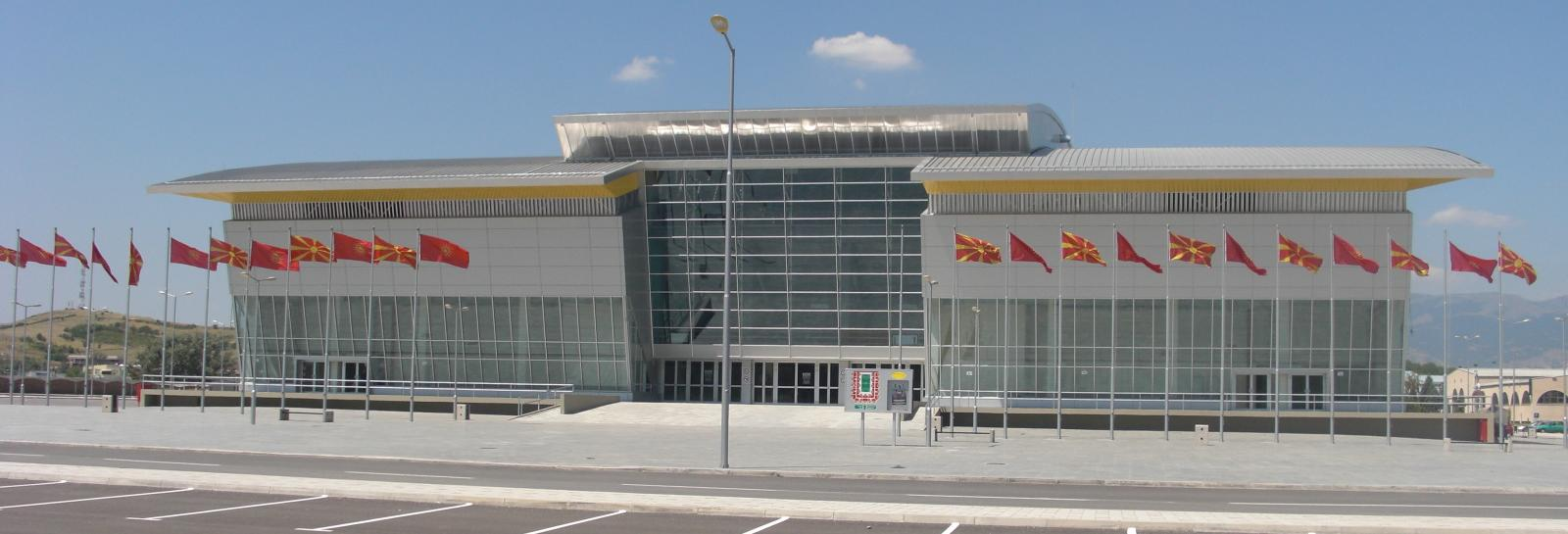
Boris Trajkovski Sports Center

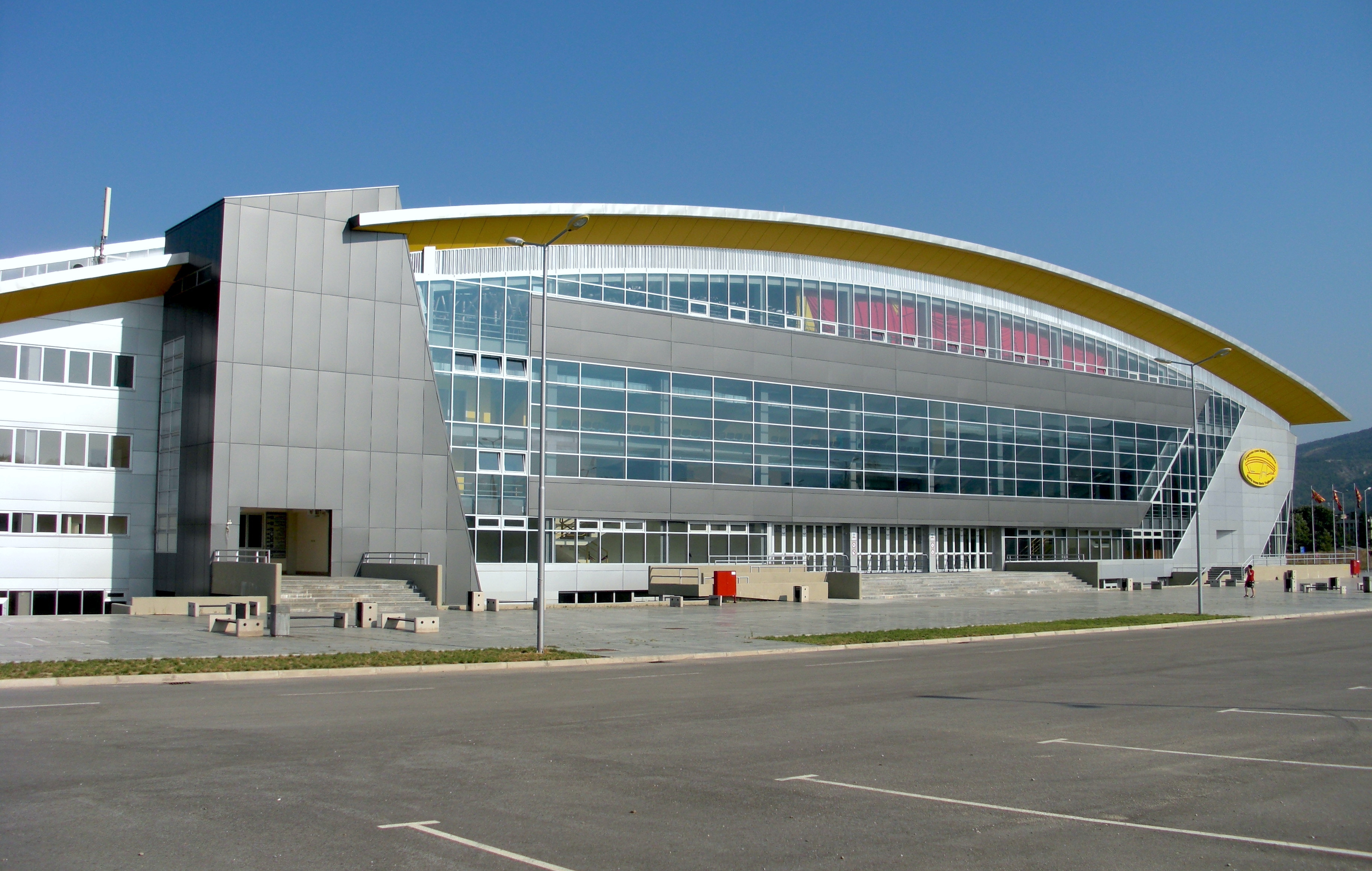
Boris Trajkovski Sports Center side view

The BTSC – Boris Trajkovski Sports Center Macedonian: Спортски центар Борис Трајковски, Skopje is a multi-functional indoor sports arena. It is located in the Karpoš Municipality of Skopje, North Macedonia. It is named after the former president, Boris Trajkovski. Its capacity is 10,000 .There is an Olympic size Swimming Pool and 5 Star Hotel Alexander Palace within the complex. Additional Water Land Fun Park and Ice Skating Rink next to it.

The arena is a home ground of the Macedonian handball team (men and women). The venue also contains four restaurants and a sports bar. It was one of two venues for the 2008 European Women's Handball Championship and will be used again for the 2022 European Women's Handball Championship for the preliminary and main round.

== Competitive record ==
=== Olympic Games ===
Year	Round	Position	GP	W	D	L	GS	GA
(Germany) 1972 to (South Korea) 1988	1972,1976,1980,1984,1988; Within Yugoslavia team (1),(5),(6),(1),(3)							
(Spain) 1992	Qualified for the 1992 Summer Olympics but banned due to UN sanctions							
(United States) 1996	Could not participate in qualification							
(Australia) 2000	World cup served as qualifiers Did not qualify for World Cup; Did not enter							
(Greece) 2004	World cup served as qualifiers Did not qualify for World Cup; Did not enter							
(China) 2008	World cup served as qualifiers Did not qualify for World Cup; Did not enter							
(United Kingdom) 2012	Did not qualify							
(Brazil) 2016	Did not qualify							
(Japan) 2020	Did not qualify							
(France) 2024	Did not qualify							
(United States) 2028	TBD							
(Australia) 2032	TBD							
Total	0/4							

Olympic qualification tournament
Tournament	Outcome	Position	Pld	W	D	L	GF	GA
(Sweden) 2012	not qualified	4th	3	0	0	3	76	83
(Poland) 2016	not qualified	3rd	3	1	0	2	76	84

=== World Championship ===
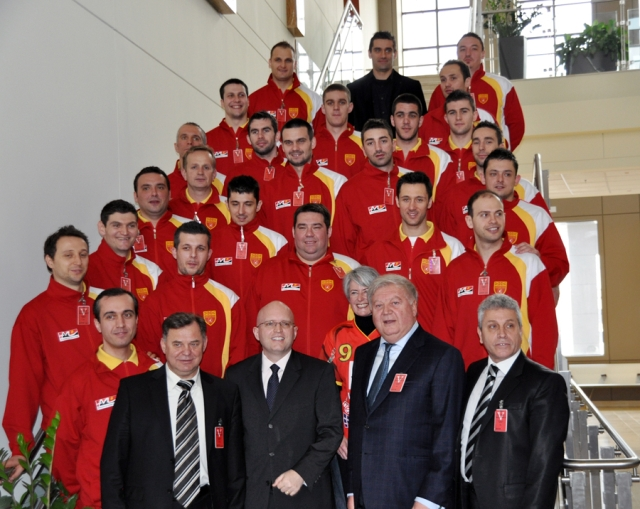
EHF EURO 2012 squad

Year	Round	Position	Pld	W	D	L	GF	GA	GD
(East Germany) 1958 to (Sweden) 1993	1958,1961,1964,1967, 1970,1974,1978,1982,1986,1990,1993; Within Yugoslavia team (8),(9),(6),(7),(3),(3),(5),(2),(1),(4),Banned								
(Iceland) 1995	Couldn't Participate								
(Japan) 1997	Did not qualify								
(Egypt) 1999	Preliminary round	18th	5	1	0	4	122	149	−27
(France) 2001	Did not qualify								
(Portugal) 2003	Did not qualify								
(Tunisia) 2005	Did not qualify								
(Germany) 2007	Did not qualify								
(Croatia) 2009	Main Round	11th	9	4	0	5	256	260	−4
(Sweden) 2011	Did not qualify								
(Spain) 2013	Round of 16	14th	6	2	1	3	165	171	−6
(Qatar) 2015	Round of 16	9th	6	4	0	2	181	168	+13
(France) 2017	Round of 16	15th	6	2	1	3	163	171	−8
(Denmark) (Germany) 2019	President's Cup	15th	7	3	0	4	191	199	−8
(Egypt) 2021	Main Round	23rd	6	1	0	5	138	192	−54
(Poland) (Sweden) 2023	President's Cup	27th	7	3	0	4	221	224	−3
(Croatia) (Denmark) (Norway) 2025	Main Round	15th	6	2	2	2	181	179	+2
(Germany) 2027	Qualified								
(France) (Germany) 2029
(Denmark) (Iceland) (Norway) 2031
Total	10/16	9th	58	22	4	32	1618	1713	−95

=== EURO Tournaments ===
Within Yugoslavia Team	Mini EURO Tournaments till 1994 EC
EURO World Cup; Sweden	1971,1974,1979,1984,1988,1992 (1),(1),(7),(3),(5),(2)
EURO Super Cup; Germany	1979,1981,1983,1985,1987,1989,1991 (4),(3),(3),(5),(5),(4),(6)

=== European Championship ===
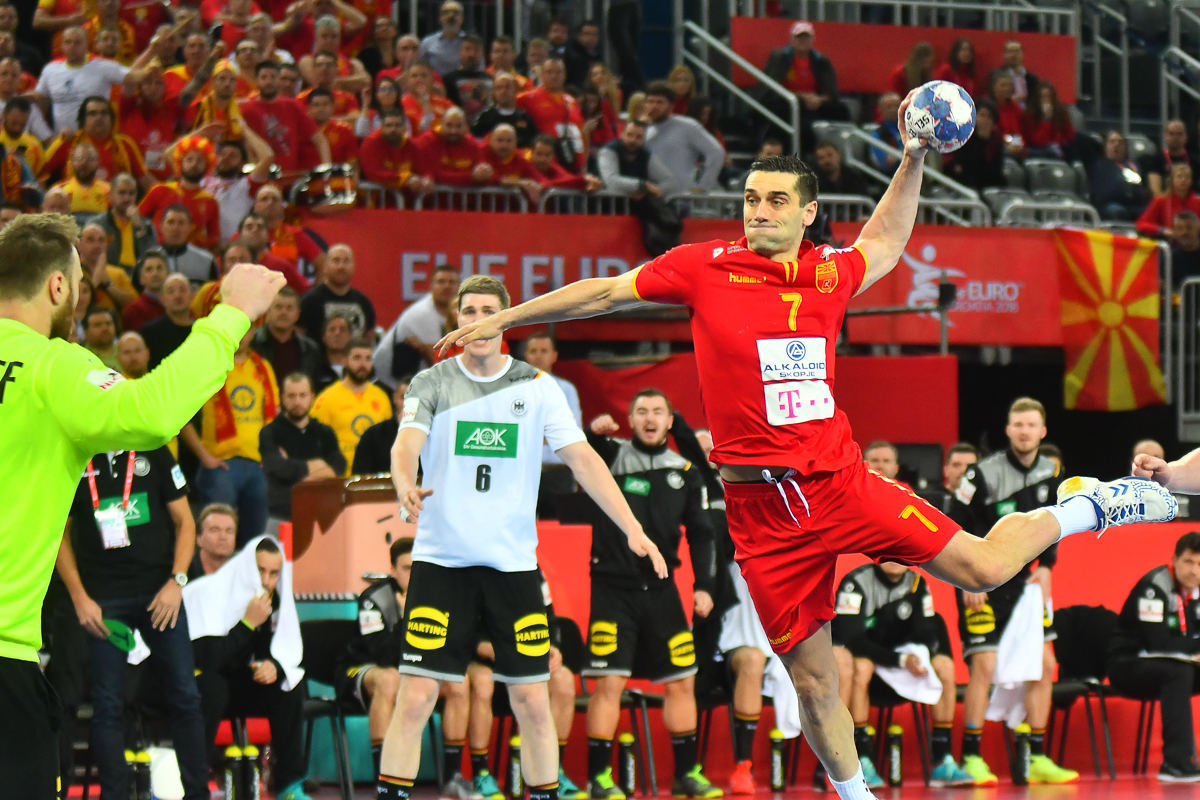
Lazarov Against Germany EHF EURO 2018

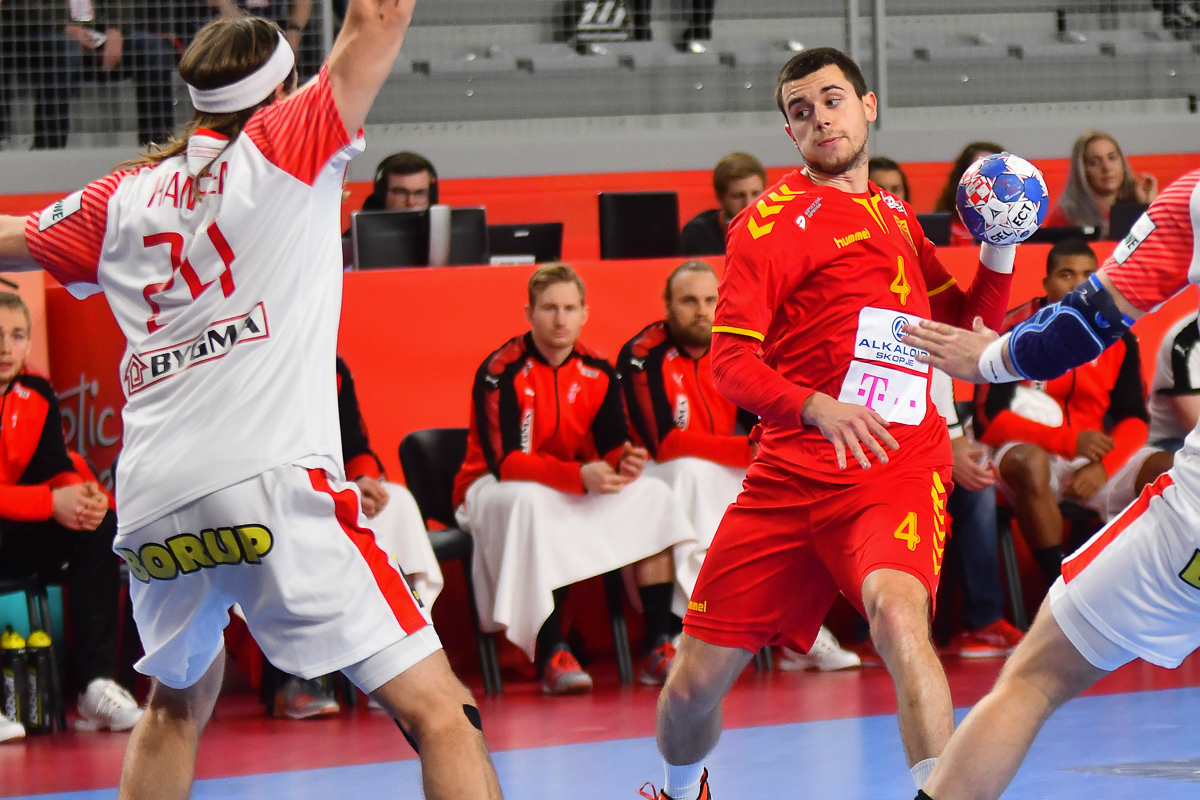
Velkovski Against Denmark EHF EURO 2018

Year	Round	Position	GP	W	D	L	GS	GA
(Portugal) 1994	Could not participate in the qualifications							
(Spain) 1996	Did not qualify							
(Italy) 1998	Preliminary Round	12th	6	0	1	5	130	174
(Croatia) 2000	Did not qualify							
(Sweden) 2002	Did not qualify							
(Slovenia) 2004	Did not qualify							
(Switzerland) 2006	Did not qualify							
(Norway) 2008	Did not qualify							
(Austria) 2010	Did not qualify							
(Serbia) 2012	5th / 6th place	5th	7	4	1	2	185	175
(Denmark) 2014	Main Round	10th	6	1	1	4	141	167
(Poland) 2016	Main Round	11th	6	0	2	4	157	176
(Croatia) 2018	Main Round	11th	6	2	1	3	143	164
(Austria) (Norway) (Sweden) 2020	Preliminary round	15th	3	1	0	2	79	84
(Hungary) (Slovakia) 2022	Preliminary round	22nd	3	0	0	3	70	86
(Germany) 2024	Preliminary round	17th	3	1	0	2	83	100
(Denmark) (Norway) (Sweden) 2026	Preliminary round	14th	3	1	1	1	77	88
(Portugal) (Spain) (Switzerland) 2028	To be determined							
(Czech Republic) (Denmark) (Poland) 2030	To be determined							
(France) (Germany) 2032	To be determined							
Total	9/16	–	43	10	7	26	1061	1214

=== Mediterranean Games ===
Year	Round	Position	GP	W	D	L
1967–1991	1967,1975,1979,1983,1991; Within Yugoslavia team (1),(1),(1),(1),(1)					
1993–2009	Did not participate					
(Turkey) 2013	Group stage	8th	4	2	0	2
(Spain) 2018	Group stage	13th	3	1	0	2
(Algeria) 2022	Semi Finals	4th	5	2	1	2
(Italy) 2026	Did not participate					
Total	3/3	–	12	5	1	6

== Team ==
=== Current squad ===
Squad for the 2026 European Men's Handball Championship.

Head coach: Kiril Lazarov

No.	Pos.	Name	Date of birth (age)	Height	App.	Goals	Club
1	GK	Nikola Mitrevski	3 October 1985 (age 41)	1.84 m	134	6	(North Macedonia) RK Eurofarm Pelister
4	RB	Martin Velkovski	10 March 1997 (age 29)	1.88 m	37	15	(North Macedonia) RK Alkaloid
9	CB	Igor Gjorgiev	2 June 2000 (age 26)	1.87 m	19	32	(North Macedonia) RK Alkaloid
10	CB	Marko Mitev	23 February 2003 (age 23)	1.83 m	15	33	(North Macedonia) RK Alkaloid
12	GK	Martin Tomovski	10 July 1997 (age 29)	1.94 m	41	5	(Germany) HB Ludwigsburg
16	GK	Ivan Galevski	5 July 2004 (age 22)	1.95 m	13	0	(North Macedonia) RK Alkaloid
17	P	Nikola Markoski	22 May 1990 (age 36)	1.97 m	73	26	(North Macedonia) RK Alkaloid
18	CB	Filip Kuzmanovski	7 July 1996 (age 30)	1.98 m	82	280	(North Macedonia) RK Eurofarm Pelister
19	RW	Nenad Kosteski	4 March 2001 (age 25)	1.88 m	46	97	(North Macedonia) RK Alkaloid
22	CB	Damjan Mitev	8 November 2006 (age 19)	1.92 m	8	7	(North Macedonia) RK Alkaloid
26	RW	Nikola Kosteski	22 August 1992 (age 34)	1.87 m	13	12	(North Macedonia) RK Alkaloid
31	P	Samoil Ristevski	22 May 2006 (age 20)	1.99 m	8	5	(North Macedonia) RK Eurofarm Pelister
32	LW	Goce Ojleski	10 October 1989 (age 37)	1.82 m	45	127	(North Macedonia) GRK Ohrid
33	P	Žarko Peševski	11 April 1991 (age 35)	1.95 m	63	90	(North Macedonia) RK Eurofarm Pelister
38	LB	Ivan Djonov	15 July 1997 (age 29)	1.91 m	13	17	(North Macedonia) RK Alkaloid
42	P	Marko Stojkovikj	27 June 2003 (age 23)	1.99 m	13	10	(North Macedonia) RK Alkaloid
44	P	Mihail Alarov	21 November 1997 (age 28)	1.95 m	10	5	(North Macedonia) RK Alkaloid
55	LW	Petar Atanasijevikj	9 July 2003 (age 23)	1.92 m	8	6	(North Macedonia) RK Eurofarm Pelister
77	RB	Martin Serafimov	3 March 2000 (age 26)	1.85 m	39	77	(North Macedonia) RK Alkaloid
88	CB	Pavle Atanasijevikj	9 July 2003 (age 23)	1.95 m	3	10	(North Macedonia) RK Eurofarm Pelister

=== Notable players ===
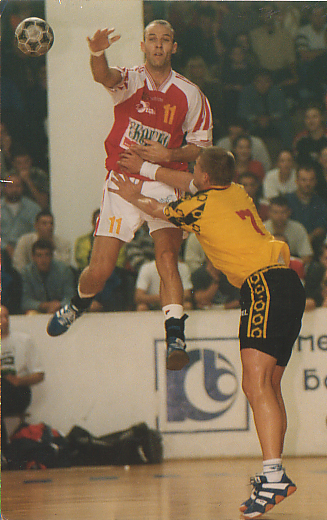
Manaskov in action

- Mitko Stoilov
- Stole Stoilov
- Goran Kuzmanoski
- Branislav Angelovski
- Stefan Alushevski
- Vlatko Mitkov
- Aco Jonovski
- Filip Mirkulovski
- Velko Markoski
- Zlatko Mojsoski
- Borko Ristovski
- Aleksandar Jovikj
- Naumče Mojsovski
- Vancho Dimovski
- Petar Angelov
- Filip Lazarov
- Zlatko Daskalovski
- Goce Makaloski
- Goran Gjorgonoski
- Radoslav Stojanović
- Kiril Lazarov
- Vlado Nedanovski
- Lazo Majnov
- Pepi Manaskov
- Dejan Manaskov
- Martin Manaskov
- Goce Georgievski
- Vladimir Temelkov
- Nemanja Pribak
- Renato Vugrinec

=== Statistics ===
Most Appearances
Name	Matches
Stevče Aluševski	243
Kiril Lazarov	236
Branislav Angelovski	159
Borko Ristovski	155
Nikola Mitrevski	142
Petar Angelov	138
Filip Mirkulovski	126
Goce Georgievski	120
Vancho Dimovski	119
Naumče Mojsovski	108

Top Scorers
Name	Goals
Kiril Lazarov	1728
Stevče Aluševski	967
Branislav Angelovski	392
Filip Mirkulovski	315
Goce Georgievski	280
Dejan Manaskov	279
Pepi Manaskov	264
Filip Kuzmanovski	250
Vladimir Temelkov	243
Vancho Dimovski	226

== Record against other teams ==
As of 3 May 2021

Key
Positive total balance (more wins)
Neutral total balance (equal W/L ratio)
Negative total balance (more losses)

National team	Total				Olympic Games				World Championship				European Championship				Mediterranean Games				Qualifications			
National team	Pld	W	D	L	Pld	W	D	L	Pld	W	D	L	Pld	W	D	L	Pld	W	D	L	Pld	W	D	L
Algeria	2	2	0	0	0	0	0	0	1	1	0	0	—	—	—	—	1	1	0	0	0	0	0	0
Angola	1	1	0	0	0	0	0	0	1	1	0	0	—	—	—	—	—	—	—	—	0	0	0	0
Austria	5	3	0	2	0	0	0	0	1	1	0	0	2	1	0	1	—	—	—	—	2	1	0	1
Bahrain	1	1	0	0	0	0	0	0	1	1	0	0	—	—	—	—	—	—	—	—	0	0	0	0
Belarus	4	1	0	3	0	0	0	0	1	0	0	1	1	0	0	1	—	—	—	—	2	1	0	1
Belgium	10	10	0	0	0	0	0	0	0	0	0	0	0	0	0	0	—	—	—	—	10	10	0	0
(Bosnia and Herzegovina) Bosnia and Herzegovina	7	3	2	2	0	0	0	0	1	1	0	0	0	0	0	0	0	0	0	0	6	2	2	2
Brazil	2	0	0	2	0	0	0	0	1	0	0	1	—	—	—	—	—	—	—	—	1	0	0	1
Bulgaria	6	6	0	0	0	0	0	0	0	0	0	0	0	0	0	0	—	—	—	—	6	6	0	0
Chile	4	4	0	0	0	0	0	0	3	3	0	0	—	—	—	—	—	—	—	—	1	1	0	0
Croatia	6	1	0	5	0	0	0	0	2	0	0	2	2	0	0	2	0	0	0	0	2	1	0	1
Cuba	1	0	0	1	0	0	0	0	1	0	0	1	—	—	—	—	—	—	—	—	0	0	0	0
Cyprus	2	2	0	0	0	0	0	0	0	0	0	0	0	0	0	0	0	0	0	0	2	2	0	0
Czech Republic	15	5	3	7	0	0	0	0	0	0	0	0	5	1	1	3	—	—	—	—	10	4	2	4
Denmark	7	1	0	6	0	0	0	0	2	0	0	2	5	0	0	5	—	—	—	—	2	1	0	1
Egypt	3	0	0	3	0	0	0	0	2	0	0	2	—	—	—	—	1	0	0	1	0	0	0	0
Estonia	6	4	2	0	0	0	0	0	0	0	0	0	0	0	0	0	—	—	—	—	6	4	2	0
Finland	4	3	1	0	0	0	0	0	0	0	0	0	0	0	0	0	—	—	—	—	4	3	1	0
France	3	0	0	3	0	0	0	0	0	0	0	0	1	0	0	1	0	0	0	0	2	0	0	2
Germany	5	0	1	4	0	0	0	0	3	0	0	3	2	0	1	1	—	—	—	—	0	0	0	0
Greece	8	6	0	2	0	0	0	0	0	0	0	0	0	0	0	0	0	0	0	0	8	6	0	2
Hungary	12	2	0	10	0	0	0	0	0	0	0	0	1	0	0	1	—	—	—	—	11	2	0	9
Iceland	18	4	2	12	0	0	0	0	3	0	1	2	1	0	0	1	—	—	—	—	14	4	1	9
Iran	1	1	0	0	0	0	0	0	1	1	0	0	—	—	—	—	—	—	—	—	0	0	0	0
Israel	4	3	0	1	0	0	0	0	0	0	0	0	0	0	0	0	—	—	—	—	4	3	0	1
Italy	4	2	0	2	0	0	0	0	0	0	0	0	1	0	0	1	1	0	0	1	2	2	0	0
Japan	1	1	0	0	0	0	0	0	1	1	0	0	—	—	—	—	—	—	—	—	0	0	0	0
Latvia	2	2	0	0	0	0	0	0	0	0	0	0	0	0	0	0	—	—	—	—	2	2	0	0
Lithuania	3	0	1	2	0	0	0	0	0	0	0	0	0	0	0	0	—	—	—	—	3	0	1	2
(Luxembourg) Luxemburg	4	4	0	0	0	0	0	0	0	0	0	0	0	0	0	0	—	—	—	—	4	4	0	0
Montenegro	1	1	0	0	0	0	0	0	0	0	0	0	1	1	0	0	0	0	0	0	0	0	0	0
Netherlands	2	1	0	1	0	0	0	0	0	0	0	0	0	0	0	0	—	—	—	—	2	1	0	1
Norway	5	1	1	3	0	0	0	0	2	0	0	2	1	0	1	0	—	—	—	—	2	1	0	1
Poland	4	2	0	2	0	0	0	0	1	1	0	0	2	1	0	1	—	—	—	—	1	0	0	1
Portugal	8	4	0	4	0	0	0	0	0	0	0	0	0	0	0	0	—	—	—	—	8	4	0	4
Qatar	1	1	0	0	0	0	0	0	1	1	0	0	—	—	—	—	—	—	—	—	0	0	0	0
Romania	4	2	0	2	0	0	0	0	0	0	0	0	0	0	0	0	—	—	—	—	4	2	0	2
Russia	5	1	2	2	0	0	0	0	4	1	1	2	1	0	1	0	—	—	—	—	0	0	0	0
Saudi Arabia	1	1	0	0	0	0	0	0	1	1	0	0	—	—	—	—	—	—	—	—	0	0	0	0
Serbia	4	2	1	1	0	0	0	0	0	0	0	0	2	1	1	0	2	1	0	1	0	0	0	0
Slovakia	2	1	0	1	0	0	0	0	0	0	0	0	0	0	0	0	—	—	—	—	2	1	0	1
Slovenia	7	2	0	5	0	0	0	0	3	0	0	3	2	2	0	0	0	0	0	0	2	0	0	2
South Korea	1	1	0	0	0	0	0	0	1	1	0	0	—	—	—	—	—	—	—	—	0	0	0	0
Spain	7	0	0	7	0	0	0	0	2	0	0	2	3	0	0	3	0	0	0	0	2	0	0	2
Sweden	3	0	1	2	0	0	0	0	1	0	0	1	1	0	1	0	—	—	—	—	1	0	0	1
Switzerland	11	5	0	6	0	0	0	0	0	0	0	0	1	1	0	0	—	—	—	—	10	4	0	6
Tunisia	5	2	0	3	0	0	0	0	3	2	0	1	—	—	—	—	1	0	0	1	1	0	0	1
Turkey	7	6	0	1	0	0	0	0	0	0	0	0	0	0	0	0	2	1	0	1	5	5	0	0
Ukraine	5	2	2	1	0	0	0	0	0	0	0	0	1	1	0	0	—	—	—	—	4	1	2	1
Total (49)	244	108	21	115																				
