= Handball Cup of North Macedonia =

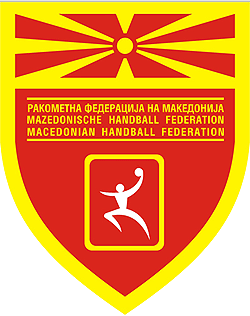
Macedonian Handball Federation logo

The Handball Cup of North Macedonia (Macedonian: Ракометен куп на Македонија), is an elimination handball tournament held annually. It is the second most important national title in Macedonian handball after the Macedonian First League of Handball. Currently, RK Vardar holds the record for most titles won with 17.

== Champions ==
=== Winners by season ===
| Year | Champion |
|---|---|
| 1993 | Ševro Kumanovo |
| 1994 | Borec Agropin |
| 1995 | Pelister |
| 1996 | Pelister |
| 1997 | Vardar Vatrostalna |
| 1998 | Pelister |
| 1999 | Pelister |
| 2000 | Vardar Vatrostalna |
| 2001 | Vardar Vatrostalna |
| 2002 | Tutunski Kombinat Brend |
| 2003 | Vardar Vatrostalna |
| 2004 | Vardar Vatrostalna |
| 2005 | Pelister Kometal |
| 2006 | Metalurg |
| 2007 | Vardar PRO |
| 2008 | Vardar PRO |
| 2009 | Metalurg |
| 2010 | Metalurg |
| 2011 | Metalurg |
| 2012 | Vardar PRO |
| 2013 | Metalurg |
| 2014 | Vardar |
| 2015 | Vardar |
| 2016 | Vardar |
| 2017 | Vardar |
| 2018 | Vardar |
| 2019 | Metalurg |
| 2021 | Vardar |
| 2022 | Vardar |
| 2023 | Vardar |
| 2024 | RK Alkaloid |
| 2025 | Vardar |
| 2026 | Vardar |

=== Super Cup Winners ===
| Year | Champion |
|---|---|
| 2017 | Vardar |
| 2018 | Vardar |
| 2019 | Vardar |
| 2021 | Pelister |
| 2022 | Pelister |
| 2023 | Vardar |
| 2024 | Alkaloid |
| 2025 | Pelister |
| 2026 | Vardar |

=== Performances ===
| Club | Winners | Winning years |
|---|---|---|
| Vardar | 17 | 1997, 2000, 2001, 2003, 2004, 2007, 2008, 2012, 2014, 2015, 2016, 2017, 2018, 2021, 2022, 2023, 2025 |
| Metalurg | 6 | 2006, 2009, 2010, 2011, 2013, 2019 |
| Pelister | 5 | 1995, 1996, 1998, 1999, 2005 |
| Borec | 1 | 1994 |
| Kumanovo | 1 | 1993 |
| Tutunski Kombinat | 1 | 2002 |
| Alkaloid | 1 | 2024 |
