= 2011–12 Macedonian Handball Super League =

2011-12 VIP Men's Super League
- League: Macedonian Handball Super League
- Sport: Handball
- Duration: 17 September 2011 -
- Teams: 12

Regular season

The 2011–12 season is the 20th season of the Macedonian Handball Super League.

== Teams ==
Locations of teams participating in the 2011-12 season

Team	City	Arena
RK Bitola	Bitola	Sports Hall Mladost
RK Borec	Veles	Gemidžii
RK Dračevo	Skopje	OU Krume Kepeski
GRK Kavadarci	Kavadarci	Jasmin Sports Hall
RK Kumanovo	Kumanovo	Sports Hall Kumanovo
RK Metalurg	Skopje	Avtokomanda
RK Metalurg Junior	Skopje	Avtokomanda
RK Ovče Pole	Sveti Nikole	Car Samoil
RK Pelister 08	Bitola	Sports Hall Mladost
RK Prespa 2010	Resen	Resen Hall
RK Tineks Prolet	Skopje	Rasadnik
RK Vardar PRO	Skopje	SRC Kale

== Regular season ==
=== Standings ===
	Team	Pld	W	D	L	GF	GA	Diff	Pts
1	Pelister 08	18	16	2	0	559	386	+173	50
2	Tineks Prolet	18	13	1	4	527	414	+113	40
3	Kumanovo	18	12	0	6	487	403	+84	36
4	Ovče Pole MI	18	11	2	5	530	451	+79	35
5	Borec	18	9	3	6	429	466	–55	28^{1}
6	Metalurg Junior	18	6	2	10	418	451	–33	20
7	Bitola	18	4	2	12	444	487	–43	14
8	Dračevo	18	4	2	12	470	532	–62	14
9	Kavadarci	18	4	0	14	501	697	–196	12
10	Prespa 2010	18	4	0	14	440	518	–78	11^{2}

- ^{1}Borec were deducted two points for not playing against Kumanovo and Metalurg Junior
- ^{2}Prespa 2010 were deducted one point for not playing against Pelister

Qualified for Play-off

Pld - Played; W - Won; L - Lost; PF - Points for; PA - Points against; Diff - Difference; Pts - Points.

=== Results ===
In the table below the home teams are listed on the left and the away teams along the top.

	BIT	BOR	DRA	KAV	KUM	MJR	OVP	PEL	PRE	TIN
Bitola		27–27	23–23	42–26	28–32	24–23	23–29	21–25	32–26	23–27
Borec	30–23		35–31	40–31	0–10^{*}	34–18	16–30	21–21	41–22	26–23
Dračevo	31–30	24–28		35–29	22–21	23–23	31–37	29–31	25–24	24–26
Kavadarci	29–25	25–37	35–30		26–37	29–25	36–41	29–32	34–33	30–40
Kumanovo	28–20	26–29	30–25	41–23		26–21	26–21	28–33	31–19	21–23
Metalurg Junior	23–20	10–0^{*}	32–27	37–23	19–22		31–29	31–31	22–21	21–24
Ovče Pole MI	30–21	22–22	29–19	47–28	29–28	29–23		21–30	38–12	26–26
Pelister 08	31–19	51–15	36–24	49–20	26–20	32–12	30–25		10–0^{*}	29–23
Prespa 2010	20–22	32–22	30–25	52–23	22–35	24–23	27–29	28–37		24–33
Tineks Prolet	27–21	40–6	33–22	54–25	17–25	33–24	22–18	20–25	36–24	

- ^{*}match awarded

== Play-off ==
=== Standings ===
	Team	Pld	W	D	L	GF	GA	Diff	Pts
1	Metalurg	10	10	0	0	299	185	+114	30
2	Vardar PRO	10	8	0	2	303	237	+66	24
3	Kumanovo	10	5	0	5	233	261	–28	15
4	Ovče Pole MI	10	3	1	6	265	297	–32	10
5	Pelister 08	10	2	0	8	273	338	–65	6
6	Tineks Prolet	10	1	1	8	214	269	–55	4

Qualification to 2012–13 EHF Champions League
Qualification to 2012–13 EHF European Cup
Qualification to 2012–13 EHF Challenge Cup

Pld - Played; W - Won; L - Lost; PF - Points for; PA - Points against; Diff - Difference; Pts - Points.

=== Results ===
In the table below the home teams are listed on the left and the away teams along the top.

	KUM	MET	OVP	PEL	TIN	VAR
Kumanovo		23–31	27–24	32–28	21–18	22–31
Metalurg	31–17		34–17	35–23	29–16	26–17
Ovče Pole MI	27–25	28–33		42–32	32–26	25–33
Pelister 08	21–24	16–40^{1}	34–25		27–28	22–36
Tineks Prolet	18–23	12–20	22–22	30–34		22–31
Vardar PRO	32–19	16–20	31–23	46–36	30–22	

- ^{1}played in Skopje

== Play-out ==
=== Standings ===
	Team	Pld	W	D	L	GF	GA	Diff	Pts
1	Borec	12	7	1	4	336	307	+29	21^{1}
2	Bitola	12	6	2	4	332	302	+30	20
3	Metalurg Junior	11	6	1	4	271	249	+22	19
4	Kavadarci	12	5	0	7	336	415	–79	15
5	Dračevo	12	4	2	6	329	342	–13	14
6	Prespa 2010	11	4	0	7	309	298	+11	12

- ^{1}Borec were deducted one point for not playing against Metalurg Junior in the regular season

Relegation to First League

Pld - Played; W - Won; L - Lost; PF - Points for; PA - Points against; Diff - Difference; Pts - Points.

As of 1 April 2012

=== Results ===
In the table below the home teams are listed on the left and the away teams along the top.

	BIT	BOR	DRA	KAV	MJR	PRE
Bitola		36–18				
Borec						
Dračevo	26–28					29–25
Kavadarci		28–24				
Metalurg Junior				35–24		
Prespa 2010						
