= 2015–16 Macedonian Handball Super League =

VIP Men's Super League
- Season: 2015–16
- Champions: Vardar (10th title)
- Champions League: Vardar; Metalurg
- EHF Cup: Prilep 2010
- Matches: 150

The 2015–16 Macedonian Handball Super League (known as the VIP Super Liga for sponsorship reasons) was the 24th season of the Super League, Macedonia's premier Handball league.

== Team information ==
Locations of the 2015-16 Macedonian Handball Super League

The following 12 clubs compete in the Super League during the 2015–16 season:

Team	Location	Arena	Capacity
Metalurg	Skopje	Avtokomanda	2,000
Metalurg II	Skopje	Avtokomanda	2,000
GRK Ohrid	Ohrid	Biljanini Izvori Sports Hall	3,500
Pelister	Bitola	Sports Hall Mladost	5,000
Prilep	Prilep	RR Ricko	700
Prolet	Skopje	Makedonsko Sonce Arena	1,200
Radoviš	Radoviš	SRC 25ti Maj	1,400
HC Rabotnichki	Skopje	Sports Hall Forca	500
Maks Strumica	Strumica	Sportska Sala "PARK"	4,000
Vardar	Skopje	Jane Sandanski Arena	7,500
Vardar Junior	Skopje	SRC Kale	3,000
RK Borec	Veles	Gemidžii	5,000

Team from SEHA League

== Regular season ==
=== Standings ===
	Team	Pld	W	D	L	GF	GA	Diff	Pts
1	Metalurg	18	18	0	0	539	368	+171	54
2	GRK Ohrid	18	13	0	5	482	432	+50	39
3	HC Rabotnichki	18	13	0	5	462	432	+30	39
4	Prilep 2010	18	10	1	7	513	486	+27	31
5	Pelister	18	8	0	10	462	446	+16	24
6	Vardar Junior	18	8	0	10	463	457	+6	24
7	Radoviš	18	7	1	10	488	514	-26	22
8	Prolet	18	6	0	12	423	460	-37	18
9	Borec	18	5	1	12	410	476	-66	16
10	Metalurg II	18	0	1	17	424	595	-171	1

=== Top scorers ===
Rank	Name	Team	Goals
1	(Serbia) Vanja Ilić	HC Rabotnichki	145
2	(North Macedonia) Ivica Iliev	Radoviš	144
3	(North Macedonia) Dimitar Dimitrioski	Metalurg II	115
4	(North Macedonia) Lasko Andonovski	Prolet	110
5	(North Macedonia) Mile Ordev	Radoviš	104
6	(North Macedonia) Filip Churlevski	Vardar Junior	86
6	(Serbia) Darko Pavlović	GRK Ohrid	86
6	(North Macedonia) Stefan Drogrishki	Pelister	86
8	(North Macedonia) Zlatko Mojsoski	HC Rabotnichki	85
8	(Ukraine) Dmitry Turchenko	Prilep 2010	85

== Playoffs ==
	Team	Pld	W	D	L	GF	GA	Diff	Pts	Qualification or relegation
1st place, gold medalist(s)	Vardar (C)	10	10	0	0	379	244	+135	30	2016–17 EHF Champions League group stage
2nd place, silver medalist(s)	Metalurg	10	8	0	2	297	229	+68	24	2016–17 EHF Champions League group stage
3rd place, bronze medalist(s)	Maks Strumica	10	5	0	5	269	334	-65	15	
4	Prilep 2010	10	4	0	6	273	318	-45	12	
5	Ohrid 2013	10	3	0	7	257	275	-18	9	
6	HC Rabotnichki	10	0	0	10	252	327	-75	0	

Pld - Played; W - Won; D - Drawn; L - Lost; GF - Goals for; GA - Goals against; Diff - Difference; Pts - Points.

== Play-out ==
	Team	Pld	W	D	L	GF	GA	Diff	Pts	Qualification or relegation
7	Pelister	20	14	1	5	586	530	+56	43	
8	Vardar junior	20	12	3	5	569	480	+89	39	
9	Radoviš	20	11	1	8	585	551	+34	34	
10	Prolet	20	11	0	9	504	480	+24	33	
11	Borec	20	7	2	11	509	550	-41	23	
12	Metalurg II	20	1	1	18	486	648	-162	4	

Pld - Played; W - Won; D - Drawn; L - Lost; GF - Goals for; GA - Goals against; Diff - Difference; Pts - Points.
