= 2014–15 Macedonian Handball Super League =

Super League
- Season: 2014–15

The 2014–15 Macedonian Handball Super League (known as the VIP Super Liga for sponsorship reasons) is the 23rd season of the Super League, Macedonia's premier Handball league.

== Team information ==
Locations of the 2014-15 Macedonian Handball Super League

The following 12 clubs compete in the Super League during the 2014–15 season:

Team	Location	Arena	Capacity
Metalurg	Skopje	Avtokomanda	2,000
Metalurg II	Skopje	Avtokomanda	2,000
GRK Ohrid	Ohrid	Biljanini Izvori Sports Hall	3,500
Pelister	Bitola	Sports Hall Mladost	5,000
Prespa	Resen	Sport Hall Prespa	1,000
Prilep	Prilep		
Prolet 62	Skopje	Makedonsko Sonce Arena	1,200
Radoviš	Radoviš	Toksikologija	1,400
HC Rabotnichki	Skopje	Gradski Rark	2,950
Tekstilec	Štip	OU Tošo Arsov	1,000
Vardar	Skopje	Jane Sandanski Arena	6,000
Zomimak-M	Strumica	Sportska Sala "PARK"	1,000

Team from SEHA League

== Regular season ==
=== Standings ===
	Team	Pld	W	D	L	GF	GA	Diff	Pts
1	Zomimak M	18	18	0	0	561	416	+145	54
2	Prilep 2010	18	11	1	6	492	443	+49	34
3	Radoviš	18	11	0	7	533	479	+54	33
4	Prolet 62	18	11	0	7	469	422	+47	33
5	Pelister 08	18	10	0	8	494	464	+33	30
6	Metalurg II	18	10	0	8	492	475	+17	30
7	GRK Ohrid	18	9	2	7	483	434	+49	29
8	HC Rabotnichki	18	4	2	12	469	501	−32	14
9	Prespa 2010	18	2	0	16	443	528	−85	6
10	Tekstilec	18	1	1	16	384	661	−227	4

Championship Round
Relegation Round

Pld - Played; W - Won; D - Drawn; L - Lost; GF - Goals for; GA - Goals against; Diff - Difference; Pts - Points.

== Championship round ==
=== Standings ===
	Team	Pld	W	D	L	GF	GA	Diff	Pts	Qualification or relegation
1	Vardar	10	10	0	0	357	232		30	
2	Zomimak M	10	7	0	3	293	279		21	
3	Metalurg	10	7	0	3	261	214		21	
4	Prolet 62	10	2	1	7	235	300		7	
5	Radoviš	10	2	0	8	256	306		6	
6	Prilep 2010	10	1	1	8	239	310		4	

Pld - Played; W - Won; D - Drawn; L - Lost; GF - Goals for; GA - Goals against; Diff - Difference; Pts - Points.

=== Schedule and results ===
In the table below the home teams are listed on the left and the away teams along the top.

	RK Metalurg Skopje	RK Prilep 2010	RK Tineks Prolet	RK Radoviš	RK Vardar	RK Zomimak M
Metalurg		–	–	26–20	–	–
Prilep 2010	18–24		–	–	–	–
Prolet 62	–	–		29–25	–	–
Radoviš	–	–	–		–	–
Vardar	–	41–26	–	–		–
Zomimak M	–	–	32–22	–	–	
