= 2016–17 Macedonian Handball Super League =

VIP Men's Super League
- Season: 2016–17
- Champions: Vardar (11th title)
- Relegated: HC Rabotnichki

The 2016–17 Macedonian Handball Super League (known as the VIP Super Liga for sponsorship reasons) was the 25th season of the Super League, Macedonia's premier Handball league.

== Team information ==
Locations of the 2016-17 Macedonian Handball Super League

The following 12 clubs compete in the Super League during the 2016–17 season:

Team	Location	Arena	Capacity
Metalurg	Skopje	Boris Trajkovski Arena	7,000
Metalurg II	Skopje	Avtokomanda	2,000
GRK Ohrid	Ohrid	Biljanini Izvori Sports Hall	4,500
Pelister	Bitola	Sports Hall Mladost	5,000
Prilep	Prilep	RR Ricko	700
Prolet	Skopje	Makedonsko Sonce Arena	1,200
Radoviš	Radoviš	SRC 25ti Maj	2,500
HC Rabotnichki	Skopje	Sports Hall Forca	500
Eurofarm Rabotnik	Bitola	Sports Hall Mladost	5,000
Vardar	Skopje	Jane Sandanski Arena	7,000
Vardar Junior	Skopje	SRC Kale	3,000
RK Borec	Veles	Gemidžii	5,000

Team from SEHA League

== Regular season ==
=== Standings ===
	Team	Pld	W	D	L	GF	GA	Diff	Pts
1	Ohrid 2013	18	14	1	3	529	437	+92	43
2	Pelister	18	14	1	3	527	435	+92	43
3	Eurofarm Rabotnik	18	13	1	4	529	437	+92	40
4	Borec	18	9	2	7	549	510	+39	29
5	Radoviš	18	8	1	9	462	469	-7	25
6	Prolet	18	8	1	9	465	473	-8	25
7	Prilep 2010	18	7	3	8	542	544	-2	24
8	Metalurg II	18	5	4	9	510	550	-40	19
9	Vardar Junior	18	4	2	12	457	512	-55	14
10	HC Rabotnichki	18	0	0	18	403	606	-203	0

=== Top scorers ===
Rank	Name	Team	Goals
1	(Portugal) Sérgio Barros	Eurofarm Rabotnik	140
2	(North Macedonia) Lasko Andonovski	Prolet	122
3	(North Macedonia) Ivica Iliev	Borec	120
4	(Serbia) Igor Milosavljević	Radoviš	107
4	(Georgia (country)) Teimuraz Orjonikidze	Prilep 2010	107
5	(North Macedonia) Dimitar Dimitrioski	Metalurg II	105
6	(Montenegro) Risto Vujačić	Vardar Junior / Pelister	97
7	(Croatia) Marko Kobetić	Ohrid 2013	96
8	(North Macedonia) Aleksandar Bozaroski	Prilep 2010	95
9	(North Macedonia) Boban Blažeski	Ohrid 2013	94
10	(North Macedonia) Aleksandar Vasilevski	Prolet	85
10	(North Macedonia) Darko Dimitrievski	Borec	85

== Playoffs ==
	Team	Pld	W	D	L	GF	GA	Diff	Pts
1st place, gold medalist(s)	Vardar (C)	10	9	0	1	350	244	+106	27
2nd place, silver medalist(s)	Metalurg	10	9	0	1	304	268	+36	27
3rd place, bronze medalist(s)	Ohrid 2013	10	4	0	6	263	294	-31	12
4	Pelister	10	4	0	6	277	303	-26	12
5	Eurofarm Rabotnik	10	4	0	6	252	272	-20	12
6	Borec	10	0	0	10	277	342	-65	0

Pld - Played; W - Won; D - Drawn; L - Lost; GF - Goals for; GA - Goals against; Diff - Difference; Pts - Points.

== Play-out ==
	Team	Pld	W	D	L	GF	GA	Diff	Pts
7	Prolet	20	14	2	4	575	494	+81	44
8	Prilep 2010	20	13	4	3	632	569	+63	43
9	Radoviš	20	12	0	8	560	514	+46	36
10	Vardar junior	20	9	1	10	536	530	+6	28
11	Metalurg II	20	7	3	10	563	568	-5	24
12	HC Rabotnichki	20	0	0	20	484	675	-191	0

Pld - Played; W - Won; D - Drawn; L - Lost; GF - Goals for; GA - Goals against; Diff - Difference; Pts - Points.

=== Relegation play-off ===
6 June 2017
17:30 CEST

Metalurg II	36–26	Vardar II
	Report

Avtokomanda, Skopje
Attendance: 200
