= Kostadin Petrov =

Macedonian handball player (born 1992)

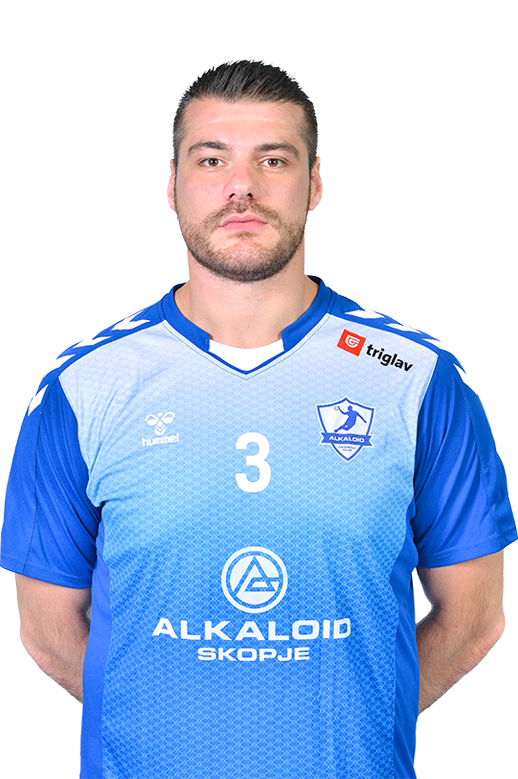

Personal information
- Nationality: Macedonian
- Born: 30 March 1992 (age 34) Veles, Macedonia
- Height: 1.90 m (6 ft 3 in)

Sport
- Sport: Handball
- Position: Line Player
- Current club: RK Multi Essens
- Number: 3

Senior clubs
- Years: Team
- –: RK Borec
- –: RK Ovče Pole
- –: RK Kumanovo
- –: RK Dračevo
- –: RK Radoviš
- 2015–2018: RK Metalurg Skopje
- 2018–2019: RK Pelister
- 2019–2020: Quabit Guadalajara
- 2020–2021: CSU Suceava
- 2021–2022: RK Metalurg Skopje
- 2022: → RK Vardar 1961
- 2022: Þór Akureyri
- 2023–2025: RK Alkaloid
- 2025–: RK Multi Essens
National team
- Years: Team
- 2018–: Macedonia

Kostadin Petrov (Macedonian: Костадин Петров) (born 30 March 1992) is a Macedonian handball player who plays for RK Multi Essens.

== Honours ==
- RK Alkaloid (North Macedonia)
- EHF European Cup

Winner (1): 2024-25
