= Strahinja Milić =

Serbian handball player (born 1990)

Personal information
- Full name: Strahinja Milić
- Nationality: Serbian
- Born: 22 December 1990 (age 35) Pristina, SFR Yugoslavia
- Height: 2.00 m (6 ft 7 in)

Sport
- Sport: Handball
- Position: Goalkeeper

Youth career
- Years: Team
- 1999–2006: RK Partizan

Senior clubs
- Years: Team
- 2006–2009: Bjerringbro-Silkeborg
- 2009–2012: RK Partizan
- 2012–2018: RK Vardar
- 2020–2021: RK Partizan
National team
Years	Team	Apps	(Gls)
2007–2018	Serbia	22	(0)
Medal record
Men's handball
Representing Serbia
European Championship
Silver medal – second place	2012 Serbia	Team

Strahinja Milić (Serbian Cyrillic: Страхиња Милић; born 22 December 1990) is a retired Serbian handball player.

== Club career ==
Born in Pristina, Milić moved with his family to Belgrade in 1999. He soon joined the youth system of Partizan. In December 2006, it was reported that Milić signed a pre-contract with THW Kiel, which was made effective after his 16th birthday. He was immediately assigned to Bjerringbro-Silkeborg.

In August 2009, Milić returned to his parent club Partizan. He helped them win the national championship in the 2010–11 season. In February 2012, Milić moved to Macedonian side Vardar. He was a member of the team that won the 2016–17 EHF Champions League. After the 2017–18 season, Milić was released by the club due to continuing problems with his weight.

== International career ==
In April 2007, at age 16, Milić became the youngest player ever to make senior debut for Serbia. He later participated in the 2014 European Men's Handball Championship.

== Honours ==
Partizan

- Handball League of Serbia: 2010–11

Vardar

- Macedonian Handball Super League: 2012–13, 2014–15, 2015–16, 2016–17, 2017–18
- Macedonian Handball Cup: 2013–14, 2014–15, 2015–16, 2016–17, 2017–18
- EHF Champions League: 2016–17
- SEHA League: 2011–12, 2013–14, 2016–17, 2017–18
