= Milan Levov =

Macedonian handball player

Personal information
- Nationality: Macedonian
- Born: 5 April 1987 (age 39) Kavadarci, Macedonia
- Height: 1.92 m (6 ft 4 in)

Sport
- Sport: Handball
- Position: Right back/Right wing

Senior clubs
- Years: Team
- 2005–2007: VV Tikveš Kavadarci
- 2007–2008: RK Prespa
- 2008–2009: Al-Khaleej
- 2009–2010: RK Vardar PRO
- 2010–2013: RK Metalurg Skopje
- 2015: RK Ohrid 2013
- 2015: HC Rabotnichki
- 2016: RK Maks Strumica
- 2016–2018: RK Radoviš
- 2018: GRK Tikveš
National team
Years	Team	Apps	(Gls)
–	Macedonia	9	(11)

Milan Levov (Macedonian: Милан Левов) (born 5 April 1987) is a retired Macedonian handball player.

== Honours ==
- Macedonian Handball Super League

Winner (2):2011,2012

- Macedonian Handball Cup

Winner (2):2011, 2013
