= Igor Pavlovski =

Macedonian handball player

Personal information
- Nationality: Macedonian
- Born: 12 February 1982 (age 44) Sveti Nikole, Macedonia
- Height: 1.87 m (6 ft 2 in)

Sport
- Sport: Handball
- Position: Line Player
- Current club: RK Zomimak
- Number: 5

Senior clubs
- Years: Team
- –: RK Pelister
- 2002-2006: CS Dinamo București
- 2006-2010: RK VV Tikveš Kavadarci 06
- 2010-2012: RK Kumanovo
- 2012-: RK Zomimak
National team
Years	Team	Apps	(Gls)
2010	Macedonia	3	(15)

Igor Pavlovski (born 12 February 1982) is a Macedonian handball player for RK Zomimak and the Macedonian national team.
