= Daniel Gjorgjeski =

Macedonian handball player

Personal information
- Nationality: Macedonian
- Born: 3 December 1993 (age 32) Gostivar, Macedonia
- Height: 1.91 m (6 ft 3 in)

Sport
- Sport: Handball
- Position: Goalkeeper
- Current club: GRK Ohrid
- Number: 93

Youth career
- Years: Team
- –: (North Macedonia) RK Jehona
- –: (North Macedonia) MRK Vardar

Senior clubs
- Years: Team
- –: (North Macedonia) RK Kumanovo
- –2016: (North Macedonia) HC Rabotnichki
- 2016–2017: (North Macedonia) RK Vardar Junior
- 2017–2019: (North Macedonia) RK Vardar
- 2019: (North Macedonia) RK Pelister
- 2019–2021: (North Macedonia) RK Metalurg Skopje
- 2021–2023: (Hungary) Budakalász FKC
- 2023–: (North Macedonia) GRK Ohrid

Daniel Gjorgjeski (Macedonian: Даниел Ѓорѓески) (born 3 December 1993) is a Macedonian handball player who plays for GRK Ohrid.

== Honours ==
International competitions

- Champions League

Winner (1): 2018–19

- European Cup

Winner (1): 2025-26
Regional competitions

- SEHA League

Winner (2): 2017–18, 2018–19
National competitions

- Macedonian Championship

Winner (3): 2018, 2019, 2020

- Macedonian Cup

Winner (1): 2018, 2019

- Macedonian Supercup

Winner (2): 2018, 2019
