= Mitko Stoilov =

Macedonian handball player

Personal information
- Nationality: Macedonian
- Born: 4 February 1983 (age 43) Bogdanci, Yugoslavia
- Height: 1.95 m (6 ft 5 in)

Sport
- Sport: Handball
- Position: Left back
- Current club: RK Mladost Bogdanci
- Number: 2

Senior clubs
- Years: Team
- 1998–2002: (North Macedonia) RK Mladost Bogdanci
- 2002–2005: (Croatia) RK Zagreb
- 2005–2013: (North Macedonia) RK Metalurg Skopje
- 2013–2014: (North Macedonia) RK Vardar
- 2014–2015: (Romania) HC Odorheiu
- 2015: (North Macedonia) HC Rabotnichki
- 2016: (North Macedonia) RK Tineks Prolet
- 2016–2017: (North Macedonia) RK Mladost Bogdanci
- 2017: (North Macedonia) RK Prilep 2010
- 2017–2021: (North Macedonia) RK Mladost Bogdanci
National team
- Years: Team
- –: Macedonia

Teams managed
- 2020–: (North Macedonia) RK Mladost Bogdanci

Mitko Stoilov (Macedonian: Митко Стоилов; born 4 February 1983) is a Macedonian handball player who plays for RK Mladost Bogdanci.
