= 2019–20 Macedonian Handball Super League =

- Season: 2019–20 (North Macedonia)
- Champions: none
- Relegated: none

The 2019–20 Macedonian Handball Super League (known as the VIP Super Liga for sponsorship reasons) was the 28th season of the Super League, North Macedonia's premier Handball league. The league was stopped in March after 17 rounds and was expanded to 16 teams for the next season.

Macedonian Handball Super League was ranked 3rd league in Europe in EHF coefficient rank list published before the season.

== Team information ==
Locations of the 2019-20 Macedonian Handball Super League

The following 10 clubs compete in the Super League during the 2019–20 season:

Team	Location	Arena	Capacity
Metalurg	Skopje	Boris Trajkovski Arena	7,000
Metalurg II	Skopje	Avtokomanda	2,000
GRK Ohrid	Ohrid	Biljanini Izvori Sports Hall	4,500
Pelister	Bitola	Sports Hall Mladost	5,000
Struga	Struga	Sala Struga	1200
Prolet	Skopje	Makedonsko Sonce Arena	1,200
Radoviš	Radoviš	SRC 25ti Maj	2,500
HC Rabotnichki	Skopje	SRC Kale	3,500
Eurofarm Rabotnik	Bitola	Sports Hall Mladost	5,000
Vardar	Skopje	Jane Sandanski Arena	7,500
Vardar Junior	Skopje	SRC Kale	3,000
HC Butel Skopje	Butel Skopje	Sala Butel	1,000

== Regular season ==
=== Standings ===
	Team	Pld	W	D	L	GF	GA	Diff	Pts
1	RK Metalurg Skopje	17	14	2	1	569	414	+155	44
2	GRK Ohrid	17	14	1	2	477	379	+98	43
3	RK Tineks Prolet	17	12	2	3	532	431	+101	38
4	HC Butel Skopje	17	12	1	4	448	399	+49	37
5	Radoviš	16	8	1	7	470	470	0	25
6	RK Vardar J	17	8	0	9	470	501	-31	24
7	RK Pelister	16	5	2	9	409	430	-21	17
8	Metalurg II	17	2	1	14	460	549	-89	7
9	RK Struga	17	2	1	14	395	511	-116	7
10	HC Rabotnichki	17	1	1	15	469	615	-146	4

- No Play Off: Season is stopped due to COVID-19 epidemic
