= Jakimovski =

Jakimovski or Jakimowski (Macedonian: Јакимовски) is a Polish and Macedonian masculine surname, its feminine counterpart in Poland is Jakimowska. Alternative spellings include Yakimovsky, Yakimoski or Jakimovsky (male）and Yakimovskaya (female). The surname may refer to

- Andrej Jakimovski (born 2001), Macedonian basketball player
- Andrzej Jakimowski (born 1963), Polish film director, writer and producer
- Blair Yakimoski, Canadian politician
- Damjan Jakimovski (born 1995), Macedonian basketball player
- Nikola Jakimovski (born 1990), Macedonian football player
- Stevčo Jakimovski (born 1960), Macedonian politician
- Toni Jakimovski (born 1966), Macedonian football manager and former player
