= RK Bitola =

Macedonian handball club

РК Битола HC Bitola
- Full name: Rakometen klub Bitola
- Arena: Sports Hall Mladost, Bitola
- Capacity: 5,000
- Head coach: Petko Boseovski
- League: VIP Super League
- 2010-11: 7th
Home	Away

RK Bitola (HC Bitola) (Macedonian: РК Битола) was a team handball club from Bitola, North Macedonia. They competed in the Macedonian Handball Super League.
