= Stefan Atanasovski =

Macedonian handball player

Personal information
- Nationality: Macedonian
- Born: 8 September 1999 (age 27) Skopje, Macedonia
- Height: 2.09 m (6 ft 10 in)

Sport
- Sport: Handball
- Position: Pivot
- Current club: RK Struga
- Number: 55

Youth career
- Years: Team
- –: RK Aerodrom
- –: RK Vardar

Senior clubs
- Years: Team
- –: RK Vardar II
- –: RK Vardar Junior
- 2020–02/2024: RK Vardar 1961
- 2020: → HC Rabotnichki
- 2022: → Al Arabi
- 2022: → Mudhar
- 02/2024–2024: MRK Kumanovo
- 2024–12/2024: KH Rahoveci
- 01/2025–2025: RK Tineks Prolet
- 2025–12/2025: RK Struga
- 01/2026–2026: GRK Tikveš

Stefan Atanasovski (Macedonian: Стефан Атанасовски; born 8 September 1999) is a Macedonian handball player for RK Struga.

== Honors ==
HC Vardar

- Macedonian Handball Cup

: 2023
