= Andon Boškovski =

Macedonian handball coach (1974–2022)

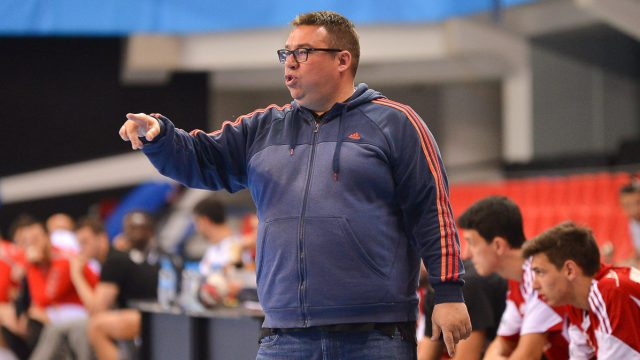
- Boškovski in 2016

Personal information
- Nationality: Macedonian
- Born: 5 October 1974 Skopje, SR Macedonia, SFR Yugoslavia
- Died: 24 September 2022 (aged 47)

Sport
- Sport: Handball

Teams managed
- Years: Team
- 2004: HC Rabotnichki
- 2004–2006: RK Metalurg Skopje (assistant)
- 2006–2007: RK Mladost Bogdanci
- 2007–2011: RK Metalurg Skopje (assistant)
- 2008–2013: Macedonia (assistant)
- 2011–2014: HC Vardar Skopje (assistant)
- 2015–2016: HC Rabotnichki
- 2016: HCM Roman
- 2016–2017: RK Eurofarm Rabotnik
- 2017–2019: Georgia
- 2018–2019: RK Struga
- 2019–2021: RK Golden Art KL7
- 2021: RK Radoviš
- 2021: RK Tineks Prolet
- 2022: KH Vushtrria

Andon Boškovski (5 October 1974 – 24 September 2022) was a Macedonian handball coach.

He was a player for the Macedonian club Rabotnicki and Macedonian youth national team until he was forced to retire as a young player due to hand injury.

== Career as handball coach ==
Andon Boškovski started his coaching career from the club where he finished his playing career, the team of Rabotnicki. In 2004 he transferred to, then ambitious club, RK Metalurg Skopje taking the role of assistant coach. With Metalurg he won the Macedonian national league and participated in the Champions League, before he moved to another project with the team from Bogdanci. Handball club Bogdanci lasted about a year, and Boškovski returned to Metalurg where he stayed until 2011. In 2011, Boškovski moved to Vardar and assisted coach Veselin Vujovic in winning the SEHA League, the national title and the Cup title. For a short period in 2014, Boškovski had a new function as the head coach of Vardar. In 2015 he was appointed head coach of the oldest Macedonian handball club Rabotnicki, which finished on the sixth position in the national championship.

Boškovski had brief international experience coaching women's handball in Romanian club CSM Roman in 2016, before he returned to Macedonia as coach of RK Eurofarm Rabotnik. Leading the club to their historic first final in the Macedonian Cup against Vardar Boškovski secured a place in EHF Challenge Cup.

== Career as assistant coach in the Macedonian national team ==
From 2008 until 2013, Andon Boškovski was assistant coach in the Macedonian national team. During this period Macedonian national team participated in the 2009 World Men's Handball Championship, 2012 European Men's Handball Championship and 2013 World Men's Handball Championship.
