= Atanasovski =

Atanasovski is a surname. Notable people with the surname include:

- Pece Atanasovski (1925–1996), Macedonian instrumentalist
- Stefan Atanasovski (born 1999), Macedonian handball player
