= Martin Popovski =

Macedonian handball player

Personal information
- Nationality: Macedonian
- Born: 26 August 1994 (age 32) Štip, Macedonia
- Height: 1.77 m (5 ft 10 in)

Sport
- Sport: Handball
- Position: Right wing
- Current club: HSC Suhr Aarau
- Number: 25

Youth career
- Years: Team
- –: RK Tekstilec

Senior clubs
- Years: Team
- –2014: RK Tekstilec
- 2014–2017: RK Vardar Junior
- 2017–2019: RK Vardar
- 2019–2020: RK Tineks Prolet
- 2020–2025: GC Amicitia Zürich
- 2025–: HSC Suhr Aarau
National team
Years	Team	Apps	(Gls)
2017–	North Macedonia	26	(19)

Martin Popovski (Macedonian: Мартин Поповски) (born 26 August 1994) is a Macedonian handball player for HSC Suhr Aarau.

== Accomplishments ==
RK Vardar

=== Domestic competitions ===
- Macedonian Handball Super League

Winner (2): 2017–18, 2018–19

- Macedonian Handball Cup

Winner (1): 2018

- Macedonian Handball Super Cup

Winner (2): 2018, 2019

=== European competitions ===
- EHF Champions League

Winner (1): 2018–19

=== Other competitions ===
- SEHA League

Winner (2): 2017–18, 2018–19

- IHF Super Globe

Third placed: 2019
