= Blagojče Trajkovski =

Macedonian handball player

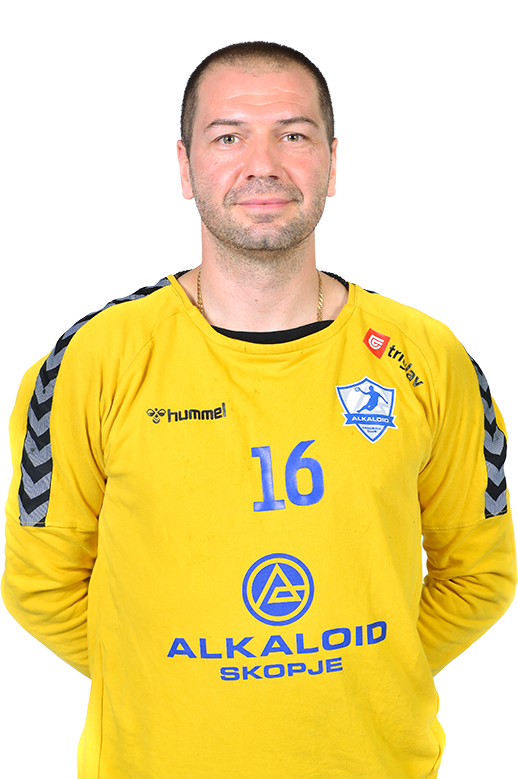

Personal information
- Nationality: Macedonian
- Born: 6 October 1986 (age 40) Prilep, Macedonia
- Height: 1.84 m (6 ft 0 in)

Sport
- Sport: Handball
- Position: Goalkeeper
- Current club: RK Prilep
- Number: 12

Senior clubs
- Years: Team
- –: RK Kumanovo
- –: RK Radoviš
- 2014–2016: RK Maks Strumica
- 2016–2018: RK Ohrid 2013
- 2018–2021: RK Eurofarm Pelister
- 2021–2022: RK Eurofarm Pelister 2
- 2022–2025: RK Alkaloid
- 2025–2026: HC Butel Skopje
- 2026–: RK Prilep
National team
Years	Team	Apps	(Gls)
2017–	Macedonia	6	(3)

Blagojče Trajkovski (Macedonian: Благојче Трајковски; born 6 October 1986) is a Macedonian handball player who plays for RK Prilep and the Macedonian national team.

== Honours ==
- EHF European Cup

Winner (1): 2024-25
