= Budakalász FKC =

Hungarian handball club

- Full name: Budakalász Férfi Kézilabda Club
- Short name: Budakalász
- Founded: 1992; 34 years ago
- Arena: Budakalászi Sportcsarnok, Budakalász
- Capacity: 400 seats
- President: Gábor Hajdu
- Head coach: István Csoknyai
- League: Nemzeti Bajnokság I
- 2021–22: Nemzeti Bajnokság I, 8th of 14
- Club colours
Home	Away

Budakalász FKC is a Hungarian handball club from Budakalász, that played in the Nemzeti Bajnokság I, the top level championship in Hungary.

Location of Budakalász FKC

== Crest, colours, supporters ==
=== Naming history ===
Name	Period
Szentendre KC	−2015
CYEB Budakalász FKC	2015–2016
CYEB Budakalász	2016–2019
Budakalász KZRT	2019–present

=== Kit manufacturers and shirt sponsor ===
The following table shows in detail Budakalász FKC kit manufacturers and shirt sponsors by year:

Kit manufacturers

Period	Kit manufacturer
– 2015	(Denmark) Hummel
2015–2019	(Germany) Adidas
2019–2024	(Hungary) 2Rule
2024–present	(Denmark) Hummel

Shirt sponsor

Period	Sponsor
2013–2015	SWIETELSKY Magyarország Kft.
2015–2016	SWIETELSKY Magyarország Kft. / CYEB Energiakereskedő Kft.
2016–2017	tippmixPro / SWIETELSKY Magyarország Kft. / CYEB Energiakereskedő Kft.
2017–2018	tippmix / Zöld Út – Építő Építőipari és Szolgáltató Kft. / CYEB Energiakereskedő Kft. / Épkar Zrt
2018–2019	tippmix / Zöld Út – Építő Építőipari és Szolgáltató Kft. / CYEB Energiakereskedő Kft. / Vizes Nyolcas Uszoda és Szabadidőközpont
2019–present	tippmix / SWIETELSKY Magyarország Kft.

=== Kits ===
HOME
2015–17	2018–19	2Rule; 2021–2024	2024–

AWAY
2015–17	2018–19	2Rule; 2021–2024	2024–

THIRD
2015–17	2Rule; 2021–2024

== Sports Hall information ==
- Name: – Budakalászi Sportcsarnok
- City: – Budakalász
- Capacity: – 400
- Address: – 2011 Budakalász, Omszk park 1. az Omszki-tó mellett

== Management ==
Position	Name
President	(Hungary) Gábor Hajdu
Technical director	(Hungary) Péter Gúnya
Member Of The Board	(Hungary) Gábor Egressy
Team Manager	(Hungary) István Horváth
Technical manager	(Hungary) Zoltán Perényi

== Team ==
=== Current squad ===
Squad for the 2024–25 season

Budakalász FKC

Goalkeepers

- 12 (Hungary) Benedek Bíró
- 16 (Hungary) (Slovakia) Mihály Tóth
- 30 (Hungary) Dániel Váczi (c)

Left Wingers

- 3 (Hungary) Dominik Kovács
- 21 (Hungary) Tamás Tájok

Right Wingers

- 26 (Hungary) Martin Varjú
- 28 (Hungary) Péter Szakács

Line Players

- 4 (Hungary) Mihály Tyiskov
- 17 (Russia) Maksim Mikhalin
- 64 (Hungary) László Kőrösi
- 99 (Hungary) Máté Dávid

Central Backs

- 7 (Hungary) Ádám Juhász
- 18 (Hungary) Mihály Varga

Left Backs

- 11 (Hungary) Roland Fórizs
- 27 (Czech Republic) Jan Polcar
- 32 (Croatia) Josip Jurić-Grgić

Right Backs

- 33 (Hungary) Bence Papp
- 71 (Hungary) Benjamin Sinkovits

=== Technical staff ===
- Head coach: (Hungary) István Csoknyai
- Assistant coach: (Hungary) Tamás Hajdu
- Goalkeeping coach: (Hungary) Tímea Sugár
- Fitness coach: (Hungary) Zsolt Fekésházy
- Masseur: (Hungary) Csaba Bendó
- Club Doctor: (Hungary) Dr. Gyula Szikora

=== Transfers ===
Transfers for the 2026–27 season

Joining

Leaving

- (Hungary) István Mátés (CB) to (Hungary) HE-DO B. Braun Gyöngyös
- (Hungary) Martin Varjú (RW) to (Hungary) Szigetszentmiklósi KSK
- (Hungary) Mihály Varga (CB) to (Hungary) Szigetszentmiklósi KSK
- (Hungary) Tibor Nagy (GK) to (Hungary) NEKA
- (Hungary) Máté Száva (LW) to (Hungary) QHB-Eger
- (Hungary) Máté Dávid (LP) to (Hungary) Ceglédi KKSE
- (Hungary) Ákos Takács (GK) to (Hungary) Salgótarjáni SKC

Transfers for the 2025–26 season

Joining

- (Hungary) István Mátés (CB) from (Hungary) Győri ETO-UNI FKC
- (Hungary) Tibor Nagy (GK) from (Hungary) Dabas KK
- (Hungary) Ákos Takács (GK) from (Hungary) PLER-Budapest
- (Hungary) Máté Száva (LW) from (Hungary) QHB-Eger
- (Hungary) Gellért Fekete (LP) on loan from (Hungary) Balatonfüredi KSE
- (Hungary) Zakor Zalán (LP) on loan from (Hungary) Győri ETO-UNI FKC
- (Poland) Patryk Pieczonka (LB) on loan from (Hungary) Győri ETO-UNI FKC
- (Slovakia) Marek Korbel (RB) from (Slovakia) ŠKP Bratislava
- (Croatia) Matej Vuleta (CB) on loan from (Hungary) Budai Farkasok KKUK
- (Hungary) Áron Kovács (RB) on loan from (Hungary) Budai Farkasok KKUK

Leaving

- (Russia) Maksim Mikhalin (LP) to (Russia) HBC CSKA Moscow
- (Croatia) Josip Jurić-Grgić (LB)
- (Hungary) Ádám Juhász (CB) to (Hungary) Budai Farkasok KKUK
- (Hungary) Dániel Váczi (GK) to (Hungary) Csurgói KK
- (Hungary) (Slovakia) Mihály Tóth (GK)
- (Hungary) Dominik Kovács (LW) to (Hungary) NEKA
- (Hungary) Bence Papp (RB) to (Germany) TSG Lübbenau
- (Hungary) Péter Szmetán (RW)
- (Hungary) Gellért Fekete (LP) loan back to (Hungary) Balatonfüredi KSE
- (Hungary) Benjámin Sinkovits (RB) to (Hungary) Budai Farkasok KKUK

Transfers for the 2024–25 season

Joining

- (Hungary) Ádám Juhász (CB) from (Hungary) MOL Tatabánya KC
- (Czech Republic) Jan Polcar (LB) from (Czech Republic) KH Kopřivnice
- (Hungary) Péter Szmetán (RW) from (Hungary) Veszprémi KKFT

Leaving

- (Hungary) Bence Kiss (CB) to (Hungary) Csurgói KK
- (Hungary) Levente Halász (LB) to (Hungary) Ceglédi KKSE
- (Hungary) Barnabás Berényi (LW) to (Hungary) Pécsi EAC
- (Hungary) Szabolcs Tóth (CB) to (Hungary) Vecsés SE
- (Serbia) Stefan Ranisavljević (RB)
- (Hungary) Dominik Vrhovina (LP) on loan at (Hungary) Mezőkövesdi KC

Transfers for the 2023–24 season

Joining

- (Serbia) Stefan Ranisavljević (RB) from (Slovenia) RD Slovan
- (Hungary) (Slovakia) Mihály Tóth (GK) from (Hungary) Balatonfüredi KSE
- (Hungary) Levente Halász (LB) from (Hungary) HE-DO B. Braun Gyöngyös
- (Hungary) Mihály Varga (CB) from (Hungary) OTP Bank - Pick Szeged U21

Leaving

- (North Macedonia) Daniel Gjorgjeski (GK) to (North Macedonia) GRK Ohrid
- (Hungary) András Koncz (CB) to (Hungary) Győri ETO-UNI FKC
- (Hungary) Zalán Maracskó (RW) to (Hungary) QHB-Eger
- (Hungary) Szabolcs Tóth (CB) on loan at (Hungary) Rákosmenti KSK
- (Hungary) Dominik Vrhovina (LP) on loan at (Hungary) Ceglédi KKSE

Transfers for the 2022–23 season

Joining

- (Hungary) Bence Papp (RB) from (Hungary) HE-DO B. Braun Gyöngyös
- (Hungary) Szabolcs Tóth (CB) from (Hungary) Ferencvárosi TC
- (Hungary) Rajmond Tóth (CB) from (Hungary) QHB-Eger

Leaving

- (Hungary) Péter Schmid (CB) to (Hungary) HE-DO B. Braun Gyöngyös
- (Montenegro) Ivan Perisic (RB) to ?
- (Serbia) Jožef Holpert (LW)
- (Hungary) Dominik Vrhovina (LP) on loan at (Hungary) QHB-Eger
- (Hungary) Roland Fórizs (LB) on loan at (Hungary) QHB-Eger
- (Hungary) Rajmond Tóth (CB) to (Spain) Frigoríficos del Morrazo

Transfers for the 2021–22 season

Joining

- (North Macedonia) Daniel Gjorgjeski (GK) from (North Macedonia) RK Metalurg Skopje
- (Hungary) Dominik Kovács (LW) from (Hungary) NEKA
- (Hungary) Péter Schmid (CB) from (Hungary) SBS-Eger
- (Croatia) Josip Jurić-Grgić (LB) from (Austria) Bregenz Handball
- (Russia) Maksim Mikhalin (LP) from (Russia) SKIF Krasnodar
- (Hungary) Benjamin Sinkovits (RB) from (Hungary) Ceglédi KKSE

Leaving

- (Slovakia) Jakub Prokop (LB) to (Spain) CB Nava
- (Croatia) Matko Rotim (LP) to (Hungary) Csurgói KK
- (Croatia) Tomislav Radnić (CB) to (Croatia) MRK Trogir
- (Hungary) Tamás Boros (GK) to (Hungary) Debreceni EAC
- (Hungary) Miksa Hrabák (LW) to (Hungary) Békési FKC
- (Hungary) Dávid Fekete (LW) to (Hungary) Grundfos Tatabánya KC

Transfers for the 2020–21 season

Joining

- (Hungary) András Koncz (CB) from (Sweden) IK Sävehof
- (Montenegro) Ivan Perišić (RB) from (Hungary) Dabas KK
- (Hungary) Mihály Tyiskov (LP) from (Hungary) Váci KSE
- (Hungary) Norbert Nagy (RW) from (Hungary) Váci KSE
- (Hungary) Roland Fórizs (LB) from (Hungary) Váci KSE
- (Croatia) Tomislav Radnić (CB) from (Hungary) Mezőkövesdi KC
- (Hungary) Martin Varjú (RW) from (Hungary) Mezőkövesdi KC
- (Hungary) Máté Dávid (LP) from (Hungary) Mezőkövesdi KC
- (Serbia) Jožef Holpert (LW) from (Hungary) Grundfos Tatabánya KC
- (Croatia) Matko Rotim (LP) from (Norway) Kristiansand Topphåndball
- (Slovakia) Jakub Prokop (LB) from (Slovakia) HKM Sala
- (Hungary) Péter Simányi (RB) from (Hungary) Vecsés SE
- (Bosnia and Herzegovina) Marko Ćeranić (LW)

Leaving

- (Hungary) Marcell Gábor (LB) to (Hungary) Csurgói KK
- (Hungary) Tamás Koller (LB) to (Hungary) Dabas KK
- (Hungary) Ádám Török (CB) to (Hungary) Dabas KK
- (Hungary) Milán Váczi (CB) to (Hungary) Dabas KK
- (Hungary) Ádám Tóth (RW) to (Hungary) Dabas KK
- (Slovakia) Patrik Hruščák (RB) to (Slovakia) Košice Crows
- (Hungary) Richárd Nemes (LP) to (Hungary) Grundfos Tatabánya KC
- (Hungary) Benjamin Sinkovits (RB) to (Hungary) Ceglédi KKSE
- (Hungary) Bence Simon (CB) to (Hungary) Kecskeméti TE
- (Slovakia) Martin Mazak (LP) to (Hungary) Ceglédi KKSE
- (Hungary) József Czina (LB) to (Hungary) Békési FKC
- (Hungary) Péter Simányi (RB) to (Hungary) Rév TSC

Transfers for the 2019–20 season

Joining

- (Hungary) Marcell Gábor (LB) from (Hungary) Ceglédi KKSE
- (Hungary) Miksa Hrabák (LW) from (Hungary) Budakalászi SC
- (Slovakia) Patrik Hruščák (RB) from (Switzerland) TSV Fortitudo Gossau

Leaving

- (Hungary) András Koncz (CB) to (Sweden) IK Sävehof
- (Hungary) Sándor Bohács (LW) to (Hungary) Ferencvárosi TC
- (Hungary) Csaba Leimeter (RB) to (Hungary) Csurgói KK

Transfers for the 2018–19 season

Joining

- (Hungary) Tamás Koller (LB) from (Hungary) Váci KSE
- (Hungary) Ádám Török (CB) from (Hungary) Váci KSE
- (Hungary) Mátyás Simotics (LP) from (Hungary) NEKA
- (Hungary) Milán Váczi (CB) from (Hungary) NEKA
- (Hungary) Bence Simon (CB) from (Hungary) Budakalászi SC

Leaving

- (Sweden) Emil Berggren (LB) to (Sweden) IFK Ystad HK
- (Czech Republic) Tomáš Řezníček (RB) to (Sweden) HIF Karlskrona
- (Hungary) Norbert Sutka (LB) to (Hungary) Balassagyarmati Kábel SE
- (Hungary) Máté Józsa (LP) (retires)
- (Hungary) Zsolt Tamási (GK) to (Hungary) Ceglédi KKSE
- (Hungary) Bence Nagy (LB) to (Hungary) Grundfos Tatabánya KC

Transfers for the 2017–18 season

Joining

- (Sweden) Emil Berggren (LB) from (Germany) HSG Wetzlar
- (Hungary) Csaba Leimeter (RB) from (Hungary) Grundfos Tatabánya KC
- (Czech Republic) Tomáš Řezníček (RB) from (Hungary) Gyöngyösi KK
- (Hungary) Richárd Nemes (LP) from (Hungary) Balatonfüredi KSE
- (Hungary) Benjamin Sinkovits (RB) from (Hungary) Balatonfüredi KSE

Leaving

- (Spain) Roberto García Parrondo (RW) (retires)
- (Slovakia) Michal Holdos (LB) to (Switzerland) HS Biel
- (Ukraine) Alexander Semikov (RB) to (Austria) SC Ferlach
- (Hungary) Krisztián Rédai (LB) to (Hungary) Ferencvárosi TC

Transfers for the 2016–17 season

Joining

- (Spain) Roberto García Parrondo (RW) from (Hungary) MOL-Pick Szeged
- (Hungary) Bence Nagy (LB) from (Hungary) Gyöngyösi KK
- (Hungary) Krisztián Rédai (LB) from (Hungary) Gyöngyösi KK
- (Hungary) Zsolt Tamási (GK) from (Hungary) Gyöngyösi KK
- (Hungary) Máté Halász (LB) from (Austria) HSG Bärnbach/Köflach
- (Hungary) Sándor Bohács (LW) from (Hungary) PLER KC
- (Hungary) Tamás Boros (GK) from (Hungary) PLER KC
- (Hungary) Zsolt Vasvári (GK) from (Hungary) PLER KC
- (Hungary) Ákos Glück (RW) from (Hungary) PLER KC
- (Ukraine) Alexander Semikov (RB) from (Hungary) Sport36-Komló
- (Slovakia) Martin Mazak (LP) from (Hungary) Grundfos Tatabánya KC
- (Slovakia) Michal Holdos (LB) from (Slovakia) HC Sporta Hlohovec
- (Hungary) Dávid Fekete (LW) from (Hungary) Telekom Veszprém

Leaving

- (Hungary) Csaba Bendó (RW) (retires)
- (Hungary) Ákos Doros (LP) (retires)
- (Hungary) Péter Gúnya (RW) to (Hungary) Szigetszentmiklósi KSK
- (Hungary) Péter Ulicsinyi (GK) to (Hungary) Váci KSE
- (Hungary) Benjamin Vizi (LB) to (Hungary) PLER KC
- (Hungary) Zoltán Perényi (LW) to (Hungary) Budakalászi SC
- (Hungary) Olivér Tatai (CB) to (Hungary) Budakalászi SC
- (Hungary) Balázs Csuka (LW) to (Hungary) Törökszentmiklósi KE
- (Hungary) Gergely Deák (LP) to (Hungary) Törökszentmiklósi KE
- (Hungary) Máté Halász (LB) to (Hungary) Vecsés SE

== Previous squads ==
2017–2018 Team
Shirt No	Nationality	Player	Birth Date	Position
1	Hungary	Dániel Váczi	23 August 1993 (age 33)	Goalkeeper
3	Hungary	András Koncz	1 August 1995 (age 31)	Central Back
5	Hungary	Dávid Fekete	12 October 1996 (age 29)	Left Winger
7	Hungary	Máté Bodnár	13 August 1999 (age 27)	Left Winger
8	Hungary	József Czina	24 November 1980 (age 45)	Left Back
11	Hungary	Bence Nagy	5 July 1995 (age 31)	Left Back
12	Hungary	Tamás Boros	20 May 1996 (age 30)	Goalkeeper
13	Hungary	Richárd Nemes	11 December 1996 (age 29)	Line Player
15	Hungary	Csaba Leimeter	15 December 1994 (age 31)	Right Back
16	Hungary	Zsolt Tamási	28 November 1991 (age 34)	Goalkeeper
17	Hungary	Ádám Tóth	18 October 1995 (age 30)	Right Winger
18	Sweden	Emil Berggren	3 August 1986 (age 40)	Left Back
20	Czech Republic	Tomáš Řezníček	14 March 1985 (age 41)	Right Back
21	Hungary	Máté Józsa	16 January 1982 (age 44)	Line Player
22	Slovakia	Martin Mazak	14 April 1984 (age 42)	Line Player
23	Hungary	Norbert Sutka	11 January 1985 (age 41)	Left Back
39	Hungary	Sándor Bohács	5 September 1994 (age 32)	Left Winger
49	Hungary	Kristóf Tóth	4 August 1999 (age 27)	Left Back
71	Hungary	Benjamin Sinkovits	2 July 1996 (age 30)	Right Winger

2016–2017 Team
Shirt No	Nationality	Player	Birth Date	Position
1	Hungary	Dániel Váczi	23 August 1993 (age 33)	Goalkeeper
3	Hungary	András Koncz	1 August 1995 (age 31)	Central Back
6	Hungary	Máté Halász	2 June 1984 (age 42)	Left Back
8	Hungary	József Czina	24 November 1980 (age 45)	Left Back
11	Hungary	Bence Nagy	5 July 1995 (age 31)	Left Back
12	Hungary	Tamás Boros	20 May 1996 (age 30)	Goalkeeper
14	Slovakia	Michal Holdos	10 May 1991 (age 35)	Left Back
16	Hungary	Zsolt Tamási	28 November 1991 (age 34)	Goalkeeper
17	Hungary	Ádám Tóth	18 October 1995 (age 30)	Right Winger
21	Hungary	Máté Józsa	16 January 1982 (age 44)	Line Player
22	Slovakia	Martin Mazak	14 April 1984 (age 42)	Line Player
23	Hungary	Norbert Sutka	11 January 1985 (age 41)	Left Back
24	Hungary	Krisztián Rédai	29 July 1995 (age 31)	Left Back
32	Ukraine	Alexander Semikov	9 July 1985 (age 41)	Right Back
34	Hungary	Bálint Völker	14 October 1993 (age 32)	Left Winger
39	Hungary	Sándor Bohács	5 September 1994 (age 32)	Left Winger
51	Spain	Roberto García Parrondo	12 January 1980 (age 46)	Right Winger
96	Hungary	Dávid Fekete	12 October 1996 (age 29)	Left Winger

2015–2016 Team
Shirt No	Nationality	Player	Birth Date	Position
1	Hungary	Dániel Váczi	23 August 1993 (age 33)	Goalkeeper
3	Hungary	András Koncz	1 August 1995 (age 31)	Central Back
4	Hungary	Csaba Bendó	30 November 1973 (age 52)	Right Winger
5	Hungary	Ákos Doros	27 September 1974 (age 51)	Line Player
8	Hungary	József Czina	24 November 1980 (age 45)	Left Back
9	Hungary	Benjamin Vizi	30 March 1996 (age 30)	Left Back
10	Hungary	Bence Hadobás	23 November 1996 (age 29)	Right Back
11	Hungary	Bence Nagy	5 July 1995 (age 31)	Left Back
12	Hungary	Bence Jován	30 April 1997 (age 29)	Goalkeeper
14	Hungary	Gergely Deák	20 September 1996 (age 29)	Line Player
17	Hungary	Ádám Tóth	18 October 1995 (age 30)	Right Winger
20	Hungary	Zoltán Perényi	20 May 1985 (age 41)	Left Winger
21	Hungary	Máté Józsa	16 January 1982 (age 44)	Line Player
22	Hungary	Olivér Tatai	2 May 1990 (age 36)	Central Back
23	Hungary	Norbert Sutka	11 January 1985 (age 41)	Left Back
24	Hungary	Kristóf Völker	12 July 1995 (age 31)	Central Back
31	Hungary	Péter Gúnya	14 April 1975 (age 51)	Right Winger
32	Hungary	Péter Ulicsinyi	28 September 1996 (age 29)	Goalkeeper
34	Hungary	Bálint Völker	14 October 1993 (age 32)	Left Winger
86	Hungary	Balázs Csuka	25 October 1994 (age 31)	Left Winger

== Top scorers ==
Season	Player	Apps/Goals
2015–2016	(Hungary) Norbert Sutka	26/176
2016–2017	(Hungary) Bence Nagy	21/118
2017–2018	(Hungary) Bence Nagy	26/170
2018–2019	(Hungary) Ádám Tóth	26/115
2019–2020	Cancelled	
2020–2021	(Montenegro) Ivan Perišić	26/161
2021–2022	(Montenegro) Ivan Perišić	22/97
2022–2023	(Hungary) Benjamin Sinkovits	26/126

== Honours ==
Honours	No.	Years
League
Nemzeti Bajnokság I/B Winners	1	2015–16
Nemzeti Bajnokság I/B Runners-up	1	2014–15

=== Individual awards ===
==== Domestic ====
Nemzeti Bajnokság I Top Scorer

Season	Name	Goals
2020–21	(Montenegro) Ivan Perišić	161

== Seasons ==
=== Season to season ===
As of 07/07/2025

- Seasons in Nemzeti Bajnokság I: 9
- Seasons in Nemzeti Bajnokság I/B: 16

Season	Tier	Division	Place	Magyar Kupa
2009–10	2	NB I/B Nyugat	11th	
2010–11	2	NB I/B Nyugat	11th	
2011–12	2	NB I/B Nyugat	7th	
2012–13	2	NB I/B Nyugat	10th	
2013–14	2	NB I/B Nyugat	6th	
2014–15	2	NB I/B Nyugat	2nd	
2015–16	2	NB I/B Nyugat	1st	Round 2
2016–17	1	NB I	4th	Round 3
2017–18	1	NB I	7th	Round 3
2018–19	1	NB I	11th	Round 5
2019–20	1	NB I	Cancelled due COVID-19	
2020–21	1	NB I	10th	Round 4
2021–22	1	NB I	8th	Fourth place
2022–23	1	NB I	10th	Round 4
2023–24	1	NB I	7th	Round 5
2024–25	1	NB I	12th	Round 5
2025–26	1	NB I		

=== In European competition ===
Budakalász FKC International Cup matches:

- Participations in EHF Cup: 1x

Season	Competition	Round	Club	Home	Away	Aggregate
2017–18	EHF Cup	Third qualifying round	(Spain) Helvetia Anaitasuna	27–35	21–26	48–61

==== EHF ranking ====
As of 05/12/2025

Rank	Team	Points
256	(Slovenia) RK Slovenj Gradec	3
257	(Denmark) SønderjyskE	3
258	(Spain) Helvetia Anaitasuna	3
259	(Hungary) Budakalász	3
260	(France) C' Chartres MHB	3
261	(Serbia) RK Železničar 1949	3
262	(Ukraine) Motor-Polytechnyka	2

== Former club members ==
=== Notable former players ===
- (Hungary) Csaba Bendó
- (Hungary) Sándor Bohács (2016–2019)
- (Hungary) József Czina (2015–2020)
- (Hungary) Ákos Doros
- (Hungary) Dávid Fekete (2017–2019)
- (Hungary) Péter Gúnya
- (Hungary) Máté Halász
- (Hungary) Máté Józsa (2013–2018)
- (Hungary) András Koncz
- (Hungary) Csaba Leimeter (2017–2019)
- (Hungary) Bence Nagy (2014–2018)
- (Hungary) Norbert Sutka
- (Hungary) Ádám Tóth (2017–2020)
- (Bosnia and Herzegovina) Marko Ćeranić
- (Croatia) Josip Jurić-Grgić (2021–)
- (Croatia) Tomislav Radnić
- (Croatia) Matko Rotim
- (Czech Republic) Tomáš Řezníček (2017–2018)
- (Spain) Roberto García Parrondo (2016–2017)
- (Montenegro) Ivan Perišić (2020–2022)
- (North Macedonia) Daniel Gjorgjeski (2021–)
- (Russia) Maksim Mikhalin (2021–)
- (Serbia) Jožef Holpert (2020–2022)
- (Slovakia) Michal Holdos
- (Slovakia) Patrik Hruščák
- (Slovakia) Martin Mazak (2016–2020)
- (Slovakia) Jakub Prokop (2020–2021)
- (Sweden) Emil Berggren (2017–2018)
- (Ukraine) Alexander Semikov

=== Former coaches ===
Seasons	Coach	Country
2016–2017	Attila Horváth	(Hungary)
2017–2020	Gyula Forgács	(Hungary)
2020–	István Csoknyai	(Hungary)
