= Toše Ončev =

Macedonian handball player

Toshe Onchev
Personal information
- Nationality: Macedonian
- Born: 27 December 1996 (age 29) Veles, Macedonia
- Height: 1.87 m (6 ft 2 in)

Sport
- Sport: Handball
- Position: Left/Centre Back
- Current club: MRK Kumanovo
- Number: 77

Senior clubs
- Years: Team
- 2015–2016: (North Macedonia) RK Vardar II
- 2016–2017: (North Macedonia) RK Vardar Junior
- 2017–2018: (North Macedonia) RK Vardar
- 2017–2018: → (North Macedonia) RK Pelister
- 2018–2019: (France) CO Vernouillet
- 2019: (France) Saint-Marcel Vernon
- 2020: (Greece) A.O Faiakas Kerkyra
- 2020–2021: (North Macedonia) HC Rabotnichki
- 2021–2022: (Slovenia) RK Trimo Trebnje
- 2022: (North Macedonia) GRK Ohrid
- 2023–2024: (North Macedonia) RK Golden Art
- 2024: (North Macedonia) RK Fruit Land Borec
- 2025: (Spain) Valinox Novás
- 2025–: (North Macedonia) MRK Kumanovo

Toshe Onchev (Macedonian: Тоше Ончев) (born 27 December 1996) is a Macedonian handball player who plays for MRK Kumanovo.
