= 2010–11 BIBL season =

2010–11 BIBL
- Season: 2010–11
- Teams: 10

Finals
- Champions: (North Macedonia) Feni Industries
- Runners-up: (Bulgaria) Rilski Sportist

In the third season of the Balkan International Basketball League, ten participants from the Republic of Macedonia, Bulgaria, Romania, Serbia, Montenegro and the new represented countries Bosnia and Herzegovina and Croatia has competed.

== Teams ==
Country	Teams	Teams		
Bulgaria	3	Levski Sofia	Rilski Sportist	Balkan Botevgrad
Montenegro	2	Mornar	Ulcinj	
Serbia	1	OKK Beograd		
(North Macedonia) Macedonia	1	Feni Industries		
Romania	1	Mureș		
Bosnia and Herzegovina	1	Zrinjski		
Croatia	1	Svjetlost Brod		

== Format ==
=== Regular season ===
In the regular season the teams will be divided into two groups, each containing five teams. Each team plays every other team in its group at home and away. The two teams that finished at the top of their group advance to the final four. The teams that finish second and third in their group advance to the quarterfinals. The opening game has been played on October 2, 2010 and the last matchday has been played on 1–2 May 2011.

=== Quarterfinals ===
The teams that finished second in their home played against the third placed teams in the other group in a Best-Of-3 series with home advantage.

=== Final four ===
The four remaining teams play a semifinal match and the winners of those advance to the final. The losers play in a third-place playoff. The final four has been hosted at the Jasmin Sports Hall, Kavadarci, Republic of Macedonia.

== Regular season ==
=== Group A ===
Qualified for the final four
Qualified for the playoffs

	(Bulgaria) LEV	(Serbia) OKK	(Montenegro) ULC	(Bosnia and Herzegovina) ZRI	(Croatia) SVE
(Bulgaria) LEV		92-79	81-58	98-77	94-60
(Serbia) OKK	82-79		82-66	75-72	83-81
(Montenegro) ULC	70-75	87-79		89-82	95-88
(Bosnia and Herzegovina) ZRI	76-84	98-96	82-79		79-65
(Croatia) SVE	74-104	66-72	64-67	78-90	

	Team	Pld	W	L	PF	PA	Diff	Pts
1.	(Bulgaria) Levski Sofia	8	7	1	710	576	+134	15
2.	(Serbia) OKK Beograd	8	5	3	648	641	+7	13
3.	(Montenegro) Ulcinj	8	4	4	611	633	−22	12
4.	(Bosnia and Herzegovina) Zrinjski	8	4	4	656	664	−8	12
5.	(Croatia) Svjetlost Brod	8	0	8	576	687	−111	8

=== Group B ===
Qualified for the final four
Qualified for the playoffs

	(North Macedonia) FEN	(Montenegro) MOR	(Bulgaria) RIL	(Romania) MUR	(Bulgaria) BAL
(North Macedonia) FEN		100-106	90-66	98-87	101-72
(Montenegro) MOR	84-95		83-74	87-73	79-71
(Bulgaria) RIL	76-86	84-77		85-83	91-70
(Romania) MUR	85-70	81-102	89-90		90-83
(Bulgaria) BAL	76-83	70-78	71-65	79-95	

	Team	Pld	W	L	PF	PA	Diff	Pts
1.	(North Macedonia) Feni Industries	8	6	2	723	652	+71	14
2.	(Montenegro) Mornar	8	6	2	696	648	+48	14
3.	(Bulgaria) Rilski Sportist	8	4	4	631	649	−18	12
4.	(Romania) Mureș	8	3	5	683	694	−11	11
5.	(Bulgaria) Balkan Botevgrad	8	1	7	592	682	−90	9

== Quarterfinals ==
First legs were on March 22 and 23; Second legs were on March 29 and 30; Third leg was on April 6

Team 1	Agg.	Team 2	1st leg	2nd leg	3rd leg
OKK Beograd (Serbia)	0 − 2	(Bulgaria) Rilski Sportist	88−93	57−66	
Mornar (Montenegro)	2 − 1	(Montenegro) Ulcinj	69−60	68−80	77−69

== Final four ==
Semifinals; April 15
Jasmin Sports Hall − Kavadarci
(Bulgaria) Levski Sofia	70
(Bulgaria) Rilski Sportist	74
Jasmin Sports Hall − Kavadarci
(North Macedonia) Feni Industries	82
(Montenegro) Mornar	75

Final; April 17
Jasmin Sports Hall − Kavadarci
(Bulgaria) Rilski Sportist	75
(North Macedonia) Feni Industries	88

Balkan League 2011 Champions

Feni Industries
First title
