= Csaba Leimeter =

Hungarian handball player (born 1994)

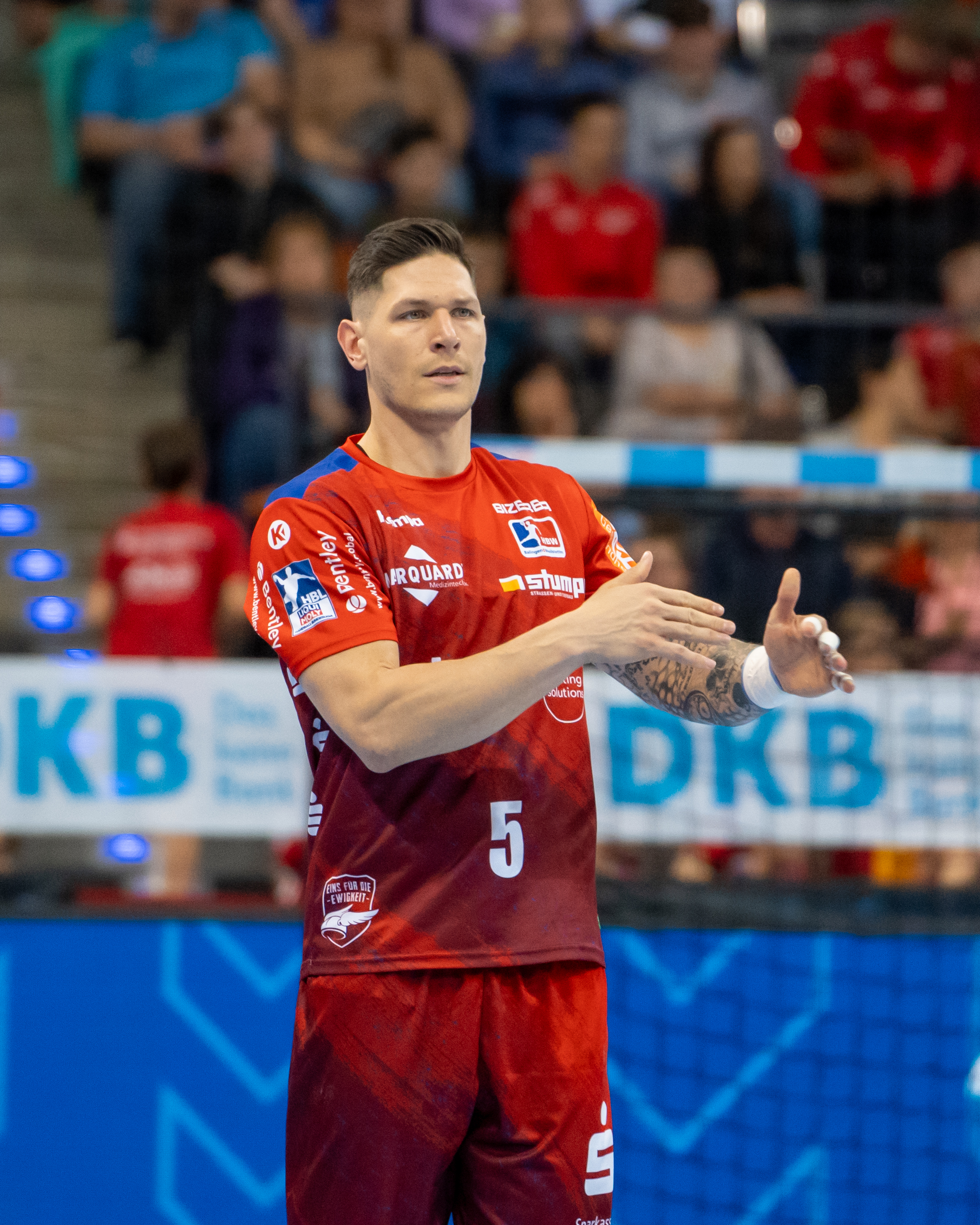

Personal information
- Nationality: Hungarian
- Born: 15 December 1994 (age 31) Budapest, Hungary
- Height: 1.95 m (6 ft 5 in)

Sport
- Sport: Handball
- Position: Right Back
- Current club: RK Zagreb
- Number: 55

Youth career
- Years: Team
- 2009–2010: Csanádi KSI SE
- 2010–2012: PLER KC

Senior clubs
- Years: Team
- 2012–2016: (Hungary) PLER KC
- 2016–2017: (Hungary) Grundfos Tatabánya KC
- 2017–2019: (Hungary) Budakalász FKC
- 2019–2021: (Hungary) Csurgói KK
- 2021–2023: (Croatia) RK Zagreb
- 2023–: (Germany) HBW Balingen-Weilstetten
National team
Years	Team	Apps	(Gls)
2020–	Hungary	11	(15)

Csaba Leimeter (born 15 December 1994) is a Hungarian handball player who plays for RK Zagreb and the Hungarian national team.

== Career ==
=== Club ===
He made his debut in the Hungarian first division in February 2011 in the PLER KC team. He played here until the end of the 2015–2016 season, when PLER KC was relegated from the Hungarian first division. In the summer of 2016, he transferred to Grundfos Tatabánya KC, where he presented himself on the international stage, in the EHF Cup. In Tatabánya, the Romanian international Demis Grigoraș played in his position, so he had few opportunities, so he left for the Budakalász FKC team after 1 year. In the summer of 2019, he joined the team of Csurgói KK. It was from there that he was bought out by the Croatian record champion, RK Zagreb, in February 2021. From the summer of 2023, he transferred to the German team HBW Balingen-Weilstetten.

=== National team ===
He was 10th with the Hungarian team at the 2013 World Youth Championship and 9th at the 2014 Junior European Championship. He played for the first time on November 4, 2020, in the Hungarian national team in Veszprém against Spain. He was included in the large squad of the 2022 European Men's Handball Championship, but in the end he did not become a member of the narrow squad. He was a member of the traveling squad for the 2023 World Men's Handball Championship for the first time in a world tournament, but he did not play in a single match at the World Cup.

== Honours ==
=== Club ===
Grundfos Tatabánya KC

- Nemzeti Bajnokság I
  - Bronze: 2017
- Magyar Kupa
  - Bronze: 2017

RK Zagreb

- Croatian Premier Handball League
  - Gold: 2021, 2022, 2023
- Croatian Handball Cup
  - Gold: 2021, 2022, 2023
- SEHA League
  - Silver: 2021, 2022

HBW Balingen-Weilstetten

- DHB-Pokal
  - Bronze: 2025
