= Maksim Mikhalin =

Russian handball player

Personal information
- Nationality: Russian
- Born: 3 September 1997 (age 29) Krasnodar, Russia
- Height: 2.07 m (6 ft 9 in)

Sport
- Sport: Handball
- Position: Pivot
- Current club: SKIF Krasnodar

Senior clubs
- Years: Team
- 2017–2021: SKIF Krasnodar
- 2021–2025: Budakalász FKC
- 2025–2026: HBC CSKA Moscow
- 2026–: SKIF Krasnodar
National team
Years	Team	Apps	(Gls)
2019–	Russia	12	(8)

Maksim Mikhalin (born 3 September 1997) is a Russian handball player for SKIF Krasnodar and the Russian national team.

He represented Russia at the 2019 World Men's Handball Championship.
