= Dávid Fekete =

Hungarian handball player (born 1996)

Personal information
- Nationality: Hungarian
- Born: 12 October 1996 (age 30) Budapest, Hungary
- Height: 1.80 m (5 ft 11 in)

Sport
- Sport: Handball
- Position: Left wing
- Current club: Budakalász FKC
- Number: 5
National team
Years	Team	Apps	(Gls)
–	Hungary	3	(3)
Medal record
Youth European Championship
Silver medal – second place	2014 Poland

Dávid Fekete (born 12 October 1996) is a Hungarian handball player for Budakalász FKC and the Hungarian national team.

He participated at the 2018 European Men's Handball Championship.

== Honours ==
=== Individual ===
- Hungarian Adolescent Handballer of the Year: 2012
