= RK Tekstilec =

Macedonian handball club

РК Текстилец HC Tekstilec
- Full name: Rakometen klub Tekstilec Štip
- Arena: OU Tošo Arsov, Štip
- Capacity: 1,000
- Head coach: Pavle Todorov
- League: VIP Super League
- 2011-12: 1st (promoted)
Home	Away

RK Tekstilec (HC Tekstilec) (Macedonian: РК Текстилец) is a team handball club from Štip, North Macedonia. They won the Macedonian First Handball League in the 2011–12 season and got promoted to the VIP Super League.

In 2011, “Tekstilec” from Štip won the state championship handball title in the cadet category. In the finals the team from Štip defeated the handball players of “Metalurg” with a result of 21:19 and stopped them to win the tenth title this season. The success was big and this handball club is continuously achieving top results.

== Former club members ==
=== Notable former players ===
- (North Macedonia) Martin Popovski
