= Stojan Petruševski =

Macedonian handball player

Personal information
- Full name: Stojan Petruševski
- Nationality: MKD
- Born: 10 December 1964 (age 61) Skopje, SR Macedonia

Sport
- Sport: Handball
- Position: Assistant Coach
- Current club: (North Macedonia) RK Vardar

Senior clubs
- Years: Team
- –2003: RK Vardar Vatrostalna
National team
- Years: Team
- –: (North Macedonia) Macedonia

Stojan Petruševski (born 10 December 1964 in Skopje, Macedonia) is a retired Macedonian handball player who played mainly for Vardar Vatrostalna. His last team was RK Vardar Vatrosalna in 2003. In 2002, he became an assistant coach in RK Vardar from Skopje, Macedonia. In 2005, he became coach in Macedonian Junior handball team. He also has played for Macedonian handball team.
