= Dimitar Dimitrioski =

Macedonian handball player

Personal information
- Nationality: Macedonian
- Born: 16 February 1998 (age 28) Prilep, Macedonia
- Height: 1.83 m (6 ft 0 in)

Sport
- Sport: Handball
- Position: Centre back/Left Wing
- Current club: RK Prilep 2010
- Number: 21

Youth career
- Years: Team
- –: RK Metalurg II

Senior clubs
- Years: Team
- 2015–2017: RK Metalurg II
- 2017–2019: RK Metalurg Skopje
- 2019–2021: RK Vardar 1961
- 2021–2022: RK Eurofarm Pelister 2
- 2022–2025: Recoletas Atlético Valladolid
- 2025–: RK Prilep 2010
National team
- Years: Team
- 2019–: Macedonia

Dimitar Dimitrioski
Personal information
- Full name: Dimitar Dimitrioski
- National team: North Macedonia
- Born: 16 February 1998 (age 28) Prilep, Macedonia

Sport
- Sport: Handball
- Position: Left wing / Centre back
- Current club: RK Prilep

Senior clubs
- Years: Team
- ~2013–2021: RK Metalurg
- 2020–2021: RK Vardar 1961
- 2021–2022: Eurofarm Pelister 2
- 2022–2025: Atlético Valladolid
- 2025–: RK Prilep

Dimitar Dimitrioski (born 16 February 1998 in Prilep, Macedonia) is a Macedonian professional handball player who plays primarily as a left wing, and occasionally as a centre back. He currently plays for RK Prilep in the Macedonian Handball Super League. Known for his sharp finishing and athletic playing style, he recorded the highest shooting efficiency among all top-30 scorers in the Macedonian Super League during the 2025–26 season.

== Club career ==
=== RK Metalurg Skopje ===
Dimitrioski began his handball career at RK Metalurg, where he first represented the club's youth setup before earning a place in the senior squad. He spent three seasons with the first team, competing in the EHF Champions League and the SEHA League. In total, he spent more than five years at the Skopje-based club.

=== RK Vardar 1961 ===
Dimitrioski then joined RK Vardar 1961, with whom he won the Macedonian Handball Super League title and the Macedonian Handball Cup in the 2020–21 season. During this period he was a regular member of the Macedonian national team.

=== Eurofarm Pelister 2 ===
Following his departure from Vardar, Dimitrioski signed a one-season contract with Eurofarm Pelister 2 in Bitola, where he adapted his role and featured predominantly as a centre back rather than a wing.

=== Atlético Valladolid (2022–2025) ===
In 2022, Dimitrioski joined Spanish top-flight side Atlético Valladolid, competing in the ASOBAL league — the highest level of Spanish handball — marking his first professional adventure abroad. He proved to be a key and consistent contributor across all three of his seasons with the club.

Among his notable performances, he was named to the ASOBAL Team of the Round after a strong display against Puerto Sagunto. In April 2025, he also featured in Valladolid's memorable 26–24 upset victory over Barcelona, scoring a technically accomplished goal.

Upon the expiry of his contract in 2025, Dimitrioski personally announced his departure, expressing gratitude toward the club and fans with the words: „Once a blue gladiator, always a blue gladiator."

=== RK Prilep (2025–present) ===
After leaving Valladolid, Dimitrioski returned to North Macedonia and was officially presented as a new signing for RK Prilep — the club from his hometown.

In the 2025–26 season, across 24 matches, he scored 161 goals with an efficiency rate of 81% — the highest shooting percentage among all top-30 scorers in the Macedonian Super League. This made him the leading scorer in the entire domestic competition.

In March 2026, he extended his contract with Prilep for the following season, remaining a central figure in the squad led by head coach Naum Taneski.

== International career ==
Dimitrioski has represented the North Macedonia national handball team on multiple occasions. Following the appointment of handball legend Kiril Lazarov as national team head coach, Dimitrioski described the improved atmosphere within the squad, noting that Lazarov had known most of the players since their youth, having followed their development from an early age. He missed certain international call-ups due to a knee injury.

== Playing style ==
A left-handed player who primarily operates as a left wing, Dimitrioski is also capable of playing at centre back. He is noted for his pace, agility and clinical finishing. His shooting efficiency of over 80% in the 2025–26 Super League season established him as one of the most effective finishers in Macedonian handball.

== Career statistics ==
| Club | Season | Competition |
|---|---|---|
| RK Metalurg | ~2013–2021 | Super League MK, SEHA, EHF Champions League |
| RK Vardar 1961 | 2020–2021 | Super League MK, Macedonian Cup |
| Eurofarm Pelister 2 | 2021–2022 | Super League MK |
| Atlético Valladolid | 2022–2025 | ASOBAL |
| RK Prilep | 2025– | Super League MK |
