= RK Mladost =

Macedonian handball club

РК Младост-1977 RK Mladost-1977
- Full name: Rakometen klub Mladost-1977
- Arena: Sportska sala, Bogdanci
- Capacity: 1,000
- Head coach: Goran Andonovski
- League: Macedonian Super Liga
- 2026-27: ?
Home	Away

RK Mladost -1977 (HC Mladost-1977 ) (Macedonian: РК Младост - Богданци) is a team handball club from Bogdanci, North Macedonia. They compete in the Macedonian First Handball League.

== Accomplishments ==
- EHF Cup Winners' Cup 1/4 Final: 1
  - 1996-97
- EHF Cup 1/8 Final: 1
  - 1999-00
- EHF Challenge Cup 1/8 Final: 1
  - 2004-05

== Current Squad ==
Squad for the 2026-27 season

Goalkeepers

- 1 (North Macedonia) Blagoj Panov
- 12 (North Macedonia) Goran Paunkov (c)
- 20 (North Macedonia) Efe Idrizov
- 91 (Serbia) Živojin Ilić

Left Wingers

- 3 (North Macedonia) Zoran Stojanovski
- 77 (North Macedonia) Dimitar Peev
- 9 (North Macedonia) Martin Prchev
- 10 (North Macedonia) Goce Argirov
- 14 (North Macedonia) Metodi Mladenovski
- 13 (North Macedonia) Slave Jankovski

Right Wingers

- 4 (North Macedonia) Gjogje Atanasov
- 7 (North Macedonia) Martin Ivanov

Line Players

- 2 (North Macedonia) Martin Stojanovski
- 24 (North Macedonia) Stamen Gogov
- 37 (Serbia) Vladimir Bojanić

Left Backs

- 5 (North Macedonia) Daniel Andonovski
- 6 (North Macedonia) Nikola Tasev
- (North Macedonia) Antonio Nikolovski
- 71 (North Macedonia) Stojan Naumovski
- 11 (North Macedonia) Todor Uzunchev

Central Backs

- 18 (North Macedonia) Dushan Karakalashev
- 33 (North Macedonia) Gjorgje Gjurić

Right backs

- 66 (Tunisia) Ahmed Majdoub

=== Transfers ===
Transfers for the 2026–27 season

Joining

- (Serbia) Živojin Ilić (GK) (from (Bosnia and Herzegovina) RK Goražde)
- (North Macedonia) Blagoj Panov (GK) (from (North Macedonia) GRK Tikveš)
- (North Macedonia) Slave Jankovski (LW) (from (North Macedonia) RK Radovish)
- (North Macedonia) Todor Uzunchev (LB) (from (North Macedonia) HC Butel Skopje)
- (North Macedonia) Nikola Tasev (LB) (from youth team)
- (Tunisia) Ahmed Majdoub (RB) (from (North Macedonia) RK Struga)
- (North Macedonia) Martin Ivanov (RW) (from (North Macedonia) MRK Kumanovo)
- (Serbia) Vladimir Bojanić (P) (from (North Macedonia) GRK Ohrid)
- (North Macedonia) Martin Stojanovski (P) (from youth team)

Leaving

- (North Macedonia) Kristijan Kostadinovski (GK) (to RK Struga)
- (Montenegro) Bogdan Nikolić (CB) (to ?)
- (Serbia) Lazar Adamović (RB) (to ?)
- (North Macedonia) Nikola Dimitrov (RW) (to (France) HC Corte)
- (Brazil) Joao Gabriel Dias Gekas (P) (to ?)

=== Professional staff ===
Position	Name
Head Coach	(North Macedonia) Goran Andonovski
Assistant Coach	(North Macedonia) Dalibor Lukić

== Former players ==
- (North Macedonia) Filip Mirkulovski
- (North Macedonia) Mite (BELA) Karaivanov
