= David Gashoski =

Macedonian handball player

Personal information
- Born: 2 September 1996 (age 30) Skopje, Macedonia
- Height: 1.97 m (6 ft 6 in)

Sport
- Sport: Handball
- Position: Pivot
- Current club: RK Vardar 1961
- Number: 6

Senior clubs
- Years: Team
- 2014–2020: Junior
- 2020–: RK Vardar 1961
National team
- Years: Team
- –: Macedonia

David Gashoski (born 2 September 1996) is a handball player for the major Macedonian handball team RK Vardar 1961, otherwise HC Vardar, in pivot position. He spent the years of his youth in the Vardar Juniors team, the B team of RK Vardar that competes in the VIP Super League regular season. In 2020, he was promoted to RK Vardar as one of the most talented future players. Like many Vardar Junior young talented players this year he signed a contract with RK Vardar for the new upcoming season 2020–21.
