= Jasmin Sports Hall =

Coordinates: 41°26′02″N 22°00′14″E

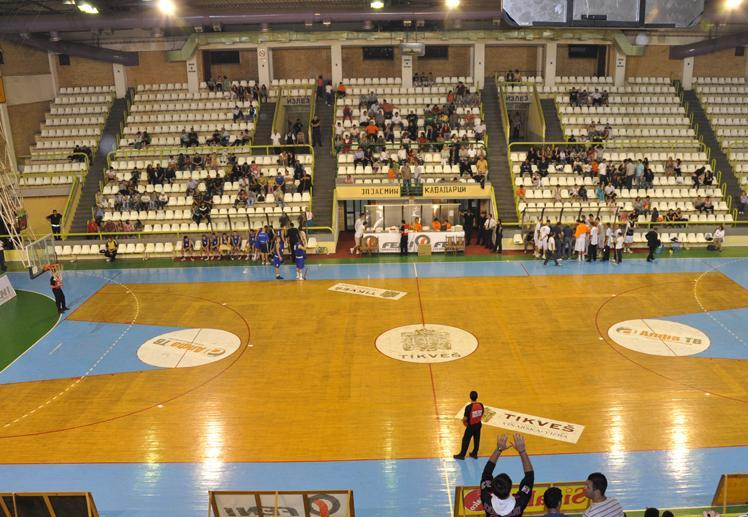
- Interactive map of Jasmin Sports Hall
- Location: ul. Brakja Hadji-Tefovi 28; Kavadarci, North Macedonia
- Owner: Kavadarci Municipality
- Capacity: 2,500

Tenants
- KK Feni Industries; GRK Tikveš

Jasmin Sports Hall (Macedonian: "Спортска Сала Јасмин") is a multi-purpose indoor sports arena located in Kavadarci, North Macedonia and seats 2,500 spectators.

The arena is used for basketball by KK Feni Industries. In May 2011, it hosted the Final Four of the Balkan International Basketball League. It has also been used for concerts and handball by GRK Tikveš.
