= RK Tutunski Kombinat =

Macedonian handball club

RK Tutunski Kombinat (HC Tutunski Kombinat) (Macedonian: РК Тутунски Kомбинат Бренд) was a team handball club from Prilep, Republic of Macedonia. The team won the 2002 Macedonian Handball Cup and had represented Macedonia in the EHF Challenge Cup and EHF Cup Winners' Cup.

== Accomplishments ==
- Macedonian Handball Cup

Winners (1): 2002
