= RK Strumica =

РК Струмица HC Astraion Strumica
- Full name: Rakometen Klub Maks Strumica
- Founded: 1954
- Arena: Arena Park
- Capacity: 4,000
- Head coach: Vanco Trendafilov
- League: VIP Super League
- 2015-16: 3rd
- Club colours
Home	Away

RK Astraion Strumica (Macedonian: РК Струмица) is a team handball club from Strumica, North Macedonia.

== Background ==
The club was founded in 1954. They defeated GRK Kavadarci in a 2012 promotion playoff and play in the VIP Super League.

The team played in 2013–14 EHF Cup season. They finished last in their group with 6 loses. In the next two seasons the team played again in EHF Cup but they didn't reach the group stage again. In the 2015-16 season they also played in the regional SEHA League, but they didn't do much where only in the 1 half season they played 14 matches in which they had 2 draws and 12 losses. In 2015-16 season the team also had financial problems who led to most of the players to leave the team. Even though they finished third in the Macedonian handball league they went into bankruptcy and as of the start of the 2016-17 season the club only runs with a youth team and goes by the name RK Strumica.

== Home ground ==
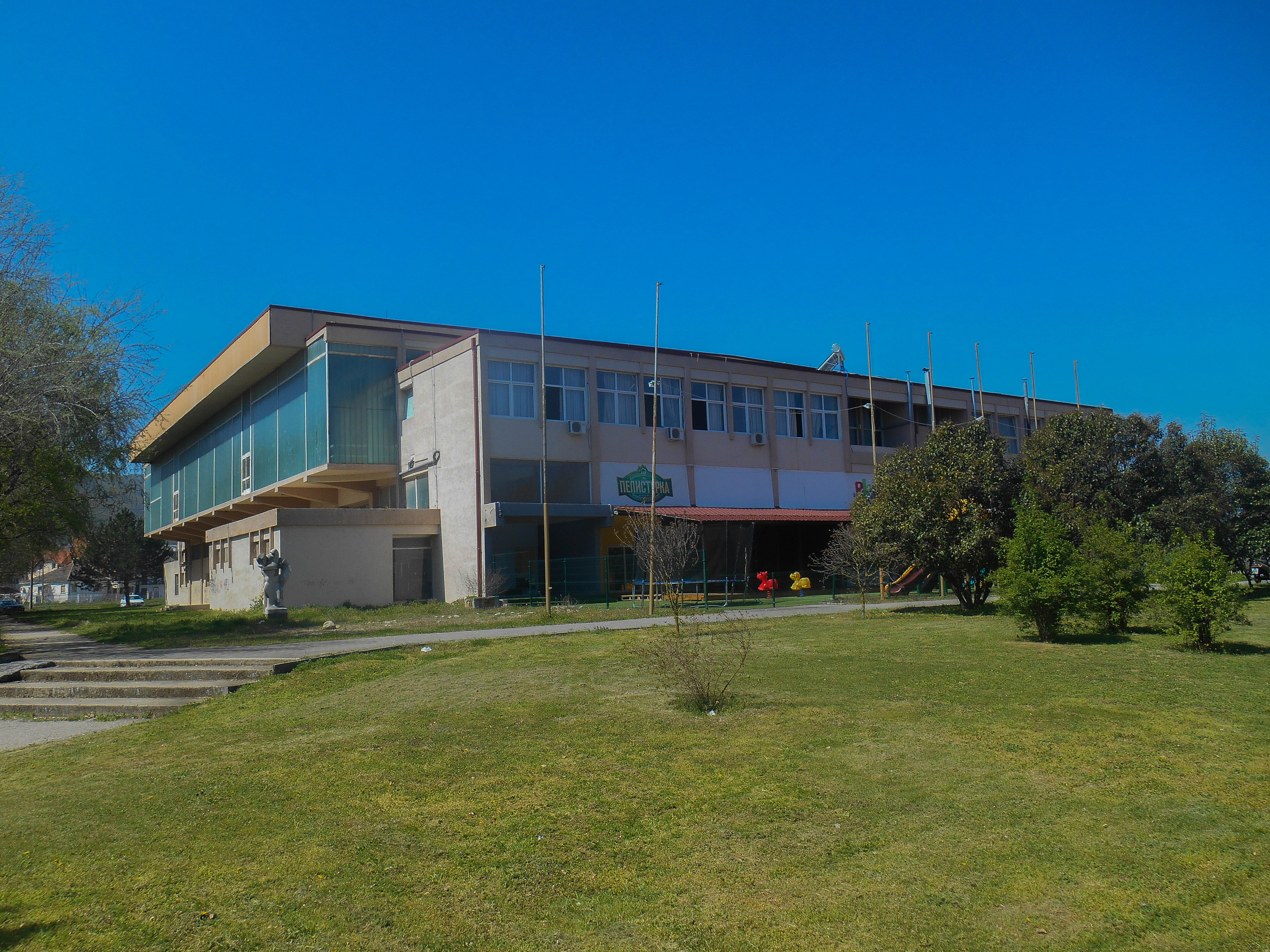
Handball Club Strumica plays their handball matches at Arena Park Sports Hall with capacity of 5000.

== Macedonian Champions ==
- 1991

== Notable former players ==
- (North Macedonia) Aleksandar Trencevski
- (North Macedonia) Aleksandar Stojanovski
- (North Macedonia) Blagojče Trajkovski
- (North Macedonia) Kiril Kolev
- (North Macedonia) Milorad Kukoski
- (North Macedonia) Igor Pavlovski
- (North Macedonia) Rade Stojanovic
- (North Macedonia) Velko Markoski
- (North Macedonia) Nikola Markoski
- (North Macedonia) Jovica Mladenovski
- (North Macedonia) Dejan Pecakovski
- (North Macedonia) Aleksandar Boseovski
- (North Macedonia) Slavisha Dimitrijeski
- (North Macedonia) Pavle Atanasov
- (North Macedonia) Zlatko Vezenkovski
- (North Macedonia) Borce Sokolov
- (North Macedonia) Milan Levov
- (North Macedonia) Vaso Dimitrov
- (North Macedonia) Krste Kosteski
- (North Macedonia) Daniel Vasilev
- (Montenegro) Stefan Čizmović
- (Montenegro) Mirko Majić
- (Bosnia and Herzegovina) Alen Kulenović
- (Serbia) Igor Milosavljević
- (Serbia) Stefan Terzic
- (Cuba) Luis Enrique Yant Sanchez
- (Lebanon) Khoder Al Nahhas
- (Georgia (country)) Revaz Chanturia
