= RK Dračevo =

Macedonian handball club

РК Драчево HC Dračevo
- Full name: Rakometen klub Dračevo Skopje
- Arena: Sportska Sala "Arhiepiskop Dositej", Kisela Voda
- Capacity: 1,000
- President: Drasko Tasevski
- Head coach: Veljo Nasteski
- League: Macedonian Second League
| Home | Away |

RK Dračevo (HC Dračevo) (Macedonian: РК Драчево) is team handball club from Dračevo, Republic of North Macedonia. They compete in the First Macedonian handball league.
