= RK Prilep 2010 =

Macedonian handball club

- Full name: Rakometen klub Prilep
- Founded: 2010
- Arena: Riste Risteski- Ricko
- Capacity: 500
- President: Nikola Chadamov
- Head coach: Naum Taneski
- League: Macedonian Handball Super League
- 2025–26: Super League (Play-out), 1st
- Club colours
Home	Away

RK Prilep 2010 (HC Prilep 2010) (Macedonian: РК Прилеп) is a handball club from Prilep, North Macedonia. It plays in the Macedonian Handball Super League. In the past this club was named as RK Tutunski Kombinat. As a part of this club RK Prilep 2010 have won the National Cup in 2002 and represented the country in EHF Challenge Cup and EHF Cup Winner's Cup. The club has fall in financial crisis and after that collapsed. In 2010 the team was revived and started to play handball again.

== History ==
RK Tutunski Kombinat (HC Tutunski Kombinat) (Macedonian: РК Тутунски Kомбинат Бренд) was a team handball club from Prilep, Republic of Macedonia. The team won the 2002 Macedonian Handball Cup and had represented Macedonia in the EHF Challenge Cup and EHF Cup Winners' Cup. After few years playing in the lower leagues, the club have won the Macedonian First Handball League in the season 2013–14. After long time in Prilep have returned the handball. RK Prilep have played his first season in the strongest Macedonian handball league. The club have prepared for his first season in the Super League, with few transfers. The biggest transfer was bringing Zlatko Mojsoski for Metalurg. He was playing for RK Prilep one season and after that he left the club. In 2014–15 season RK Prilep was 2nd on the table which gone the team in the play-off. In the play-off, in the league have joined Macedonia two biggest clubs: Vardar and Metalurg. In the play-off RK Prilep was not playing as well as the first part of the season and the result of that was the 6th place in the play-off from 6 teams. This result did not take RK Prilep to some of the European Cups. The next season RK Prilep will play in the Super League and instantly the club is on the 2nd position after the first half of the season. In 2015-16 RK Prilep finished on the 4th place on the table. That guaranteed qualification in Challenge Cup, but he played in EHF Cup because the 3rd placed team RK Maks Strumica did not have enough founds and bankrupt. The draw for the EHF Cup decided RK Prilep to play against HC Pfadi Winthentur. The both matches against Pfadi, have been played in Prilep. At the end RK Prilep lost the two matches. First match finished with final score 19:42 and second with score 15:42.

== Accomplishments ==
=== Domestic competitions (North Macedonia) ===
- Champions

Winners (2): 1987, 1989

- Macedonian Cup

2002

== European record ==
=== European competitions (European Union) ===
- EHF Cup Winners' Cup

2002 - 4th round
2003 - 4th round

- EHF Challenge Cup

2004 - 3rd round

Season	Competition	Round	Club	1st leg	2nd leg	Aggregate
2016–17	EHF Cup	R1	(Switzerland) Pfadi Winterthur	19–42	15–42	34–84

== Team ==
=== Current squad ===
Squad for the 2026–2027 season

Goalkeepers

- 12 (North Macedonia) Ivan Angeleski
- 66 (North Macedonia) Blagojče Trajkovski
- 16 (North Macedonia) Nikola Stojkoski

Left Wingers

- 21 (North Macedonia) Dimitar Dimitrioski (c)

Right Wingers

- 26 (Montenegro) Denis Šabanović

Line players

- 2 (North Macedonia) Aleksandar Trenchevski
- 3 (North Macedonia) Petar Markoski

Left Backs

- 77 (North Macedonia) Nikola Cvetanoski
- 8 (North Macedonia) Filip Adamcheski
- 22 (North Macedonia) Andrej Stojanovski
- 10 (North Macedonia) Stefan Lozanoski

Central Backs

- 4 (Montenegro) Vladan Kastratović
- 13 (North Macedonia) Angel Krsteski
- 32 (Montenegro) Lav Zekovic

Right Backs

- 25 (North Macedonia) Nikola Shipinkoski
- 34 (North Macedonia) Mario Stoleski

=== Transfers ===
Transfers for the 2026–27 season

Joining

- (North Macedonia) Blagojče Trajkovski (GK) from (North Macedonia) HC Butel Skopje)
- (North Macedonia) Andrej Stojanovski (LB) from (North Macedonia) RK Tineks Prolet
- (North Macedonia) Nikola Shipinkoski (RB) from (North Macedonia) GRK Ohrid
- (North Macedonia) Petar Markoski (LP) from (North Macedonia) RK Eurofarm Pelister 2
- (North Macedonia) Nikola Stojkoski (GK) (from (North Macedonia) RK Vardar Negotino)
- (North Macedonia) Stefan Lozanoski (LB) (from (Greece) Amintas Amintaiou HC)

Leaving

- (North Macedonia) Ilcho Ivceski (GK) (retires)
- (North Macedonia) Stefan Hristoski (LW) (to ?)
- (Montenegro) Božidar Leković (LB) (to ?)
- (North Macedonia) Božidar Ilieski (CB) (to (North Macedonia) RK Eurofarm Pelister 2)
- (North Macedonia) Nikola Šipinkoski (RB) (end of loan (North Macedonia) GRK Ohrid)
- (North Macedonia) Luka Gjorgievski (RB) (end of loan (North Macedonia) RK Eurofarm Pelister 2)
- (North Macedonia) Pece Rajatoski (RW) (to (North Macedonia) RK Struga)
- (Croatia) Tomislav Kvastek (P) (to ?)

=== Transfer History ===
Transfers for the 2025-26 season

Joining

- (North Macedonia) Dimitar Dimitrioski (LW) from (Spain) Recoletas Atlético Valladolid
- (North Macedonia) Nikola Šipinkoski (RB) on loan from (North Macedonia) GRK Ohrid
- (North Macedonia) Luka Gjorgievski (RB) on loan from (North Macedonia) RK Eurofarm Pelister 2

Leaving

- (North Macedonia) Stefan Lozanoski (LB) (to (Greece) Amintas Amintaiou HC)
