= RK Ovče Pole =

Macedonian handball club

(North Macedonia) РК Овче Поле HC Ovche Pole
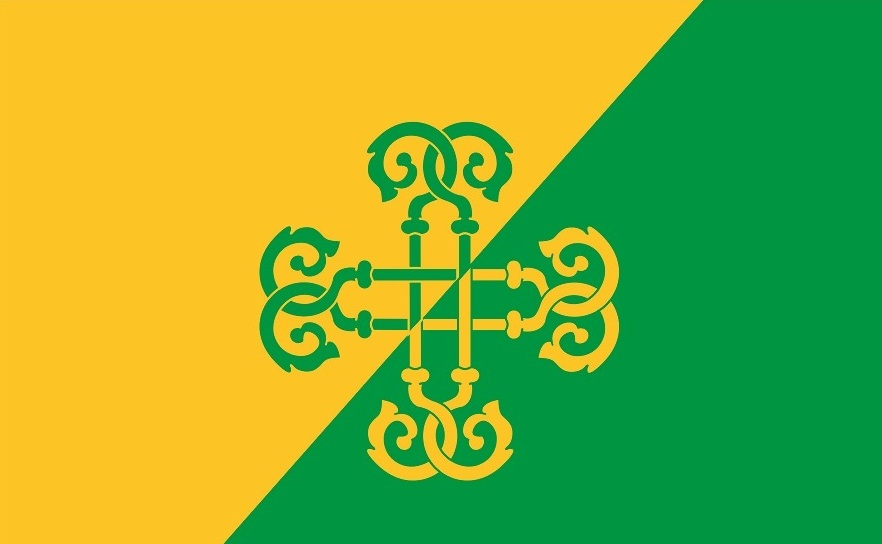
- Full name: Rakometen Klub; Ovche Pole
- Founded: 1954
- Arena: Car Samoil, Sveti Nikole
- Capacity: 2,500
- Head coach: Ivan Mitev
- League: VIP Super League
- 2010-11: 7th
- Club colours
Home	Away

RK Ovče Pole (HC RK Ovče Pole) (Macedonian: РК Овче Поле) is a team handball club from Sveti Nikole, North Macedonia. The club was founded in 1954 and compete in the Macedonian Handball Super League.

Macedonia's best known handball player Kiril Lazarov started his career at Ovče Pole.

== Macedonian Champions ==
- 1988
