= Lasko Andonovski =

Macedonian handball player

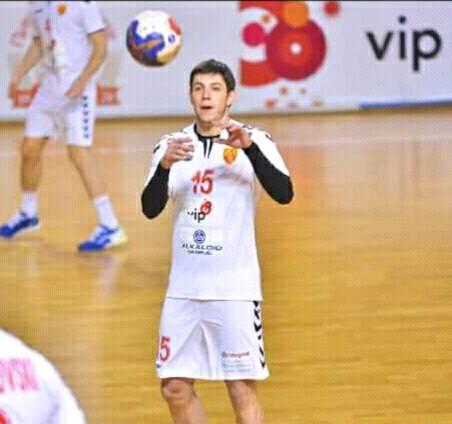

Personal information
- Nationality: Macedonian
- Born: 15 June 1991 (age 35) Resen, Macedonia (now North Macedonia)
- Height: 1.84 m (6 ft 0 in)

Sport
- Sport: Handball
- Position: Centre Back
- Current club: RK Tineks Prolet
- Number: 15

Senior clubs
- Years: Team
- 2009-2012: (North Macedonia) RK Metalurg Junior
- 2012–: (North Macedonia) RK Tineks Prolet
National team
- Years: Team
- 2017–: North Macedonia

Lasko Andonovski (Macedonian: Ласко Андоновски) (born 15 June 1991) is a Macedonian handball player who plays for RK Tineks Prolet and for the North Macedonia men's national handball team.
