= Damjan Jakimovski =

Macedonian basketball player

Karpoš Sokoli
- Position: Point guard
- League: Macedonian First League

Personal information
- Born: November 14, 1995 (age 31) Skopje, Macedonia
- Listed height: 1.78 m (5 ft 10 in)
- Listed weight: 65 kg (143 lb)

Career history
- 2013–present: Karpoš Sokoli

Damjan Jakimovski (born November 14, 1995) is a Macedonian professional basketball point guard for Karpoš Sokoli in the Macedonian First League.
