= HC Rabotnichki =

Handball club from Skopje

(North Macedonia) HC Rabotnichki
- Founded: 1948; 78 years ago
- Arena: Jane Sandanski Arena
- Capacity: 7.500
- President: (North Macedonia) Vlatko Nedelkovski & Aleksandar Miloshevski
- Head coach: (North Macedonia) Nikola Dimovski & Risto Trpchevski
- League: VIP Super Liga
- 2019/2020: 10th
- Club colours
Home	Away

Handball Club Rabotnichki is a handball club from Skopje, North Macedonia. The club was established in 1948 as a section of the Sports Association Rabotnichki and is the oldest handball club in North Macedonia. It is a member of VIP Super Liga, the top men's handball competition in the country.

== History ==
Sports Department Rabotnichki was founded on 1 July 1945 in the Working Hall in Skopje, with Aleksandar Canko Hristov as its president. In addition to football, the Rabotnichki sports department organized the first volleyball match after the Second World War and established clubs for skiing, athletics, and basketball. The handball club was founded in 1948.

In August 2013, a beach handball tournament was held in Skopje to celebrate the club's 65th anniversary. In July 2015, the club announced plans to recruit strong players for the upcoming season to make the club formidable in the Super League. Shortly afterward, several new players joined, including members of the national team. During the 2015–16 season, Rabotnichki reached the playoffs and finished in sixth place.

The following season, Rabotnichki competed in the VIP Super Liga. That year, head coach Stojan Petrushevski and assistant coach Pepi Manaskov joined the organisation. In addition to the coaching staff, a dozen new players joined the team. The team moved to Jane Sandanski Arena, where it continues to play its home matches.

On 9 January 2021, HC Rabotnichki played its first international match, against the national team of Chile, at Jane Sandanski Arena. The match ended in a 29–29 draw.

== Honors ==
- Champions

Winners (8): 1953, 1954, 1955, 1956, 1957, 1958, 1963, 1984

- Cup Winners

Winners (2): 1960, 1977

== Venue ==
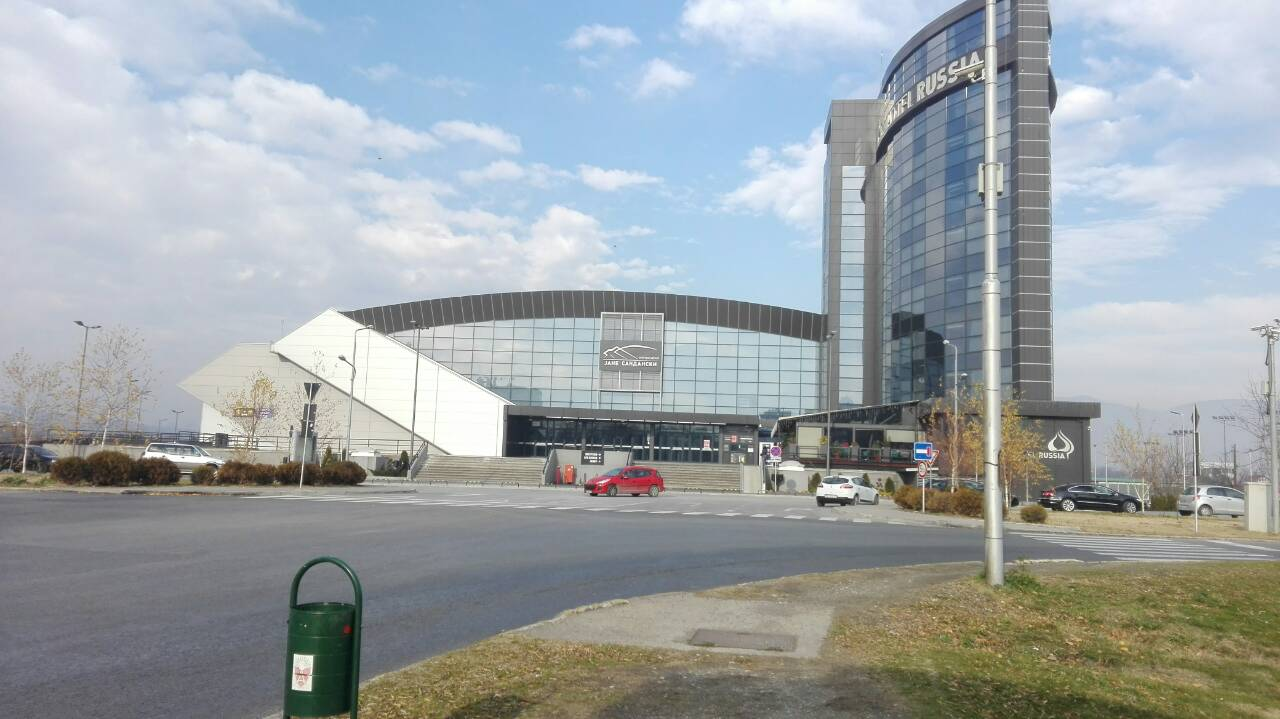
Sandanski Arena Hotel and Spa

HC Rabotnichki currently plays its league matches at Jane Sandanski Arena, an indoor sports arena located in the Aerodrom Municipality of Skopje. The arena has a capacity of 7,500 and is named after the revolutionary Jane Sandanski. The sports complex includes a hotel with a spa center, swimming pool, and sky bar. The complex also contains tennis courts, a fitness center, the club headquarters, an aerobics center, table tennis facilities, a children's playground, aHummel sports store, and a fan shop.

== Team ==
HC Rabotnichki (2022/23 season)

Goalkeepers

- 12 (North Macedonia) Ognanovski Blagoja

Players (Backs, Wingers, Play Makers)

- 6 (North Macedonia) Kristijan Tashevski
- 10 (North Macedonia) David Dimevski
- 7 (North Macedonia) Jakov Panovski
- 5 (North Macedonia) Stefan Chakalik
- 28 (North Macedonia) Petar Vilarov
- 9 (North Macedonia) Damjan Jakimovski
- 22 (North Macedonia) Stefan Damevski
- 33 (North Macedonia) Ilija Dimov
- 8 (North Macedonia) David Gashoski

Backs Right Left Central

- 43 (North Macedonia) Nino Perchuklievski LCB
- 20 (North Macedonia) Viktor Damchevski LP
- 97 (North Macedonia) Kliment Eftimov P
- 13 (North Macedonia) Enis Idrizi CB

=== Former club members ===
==== Notable former players ====
- (North Macedonia) Nikola Markoski
- (North Macedonia) Daniel Gjorgjeski
- (North Macedonia) Mitko Stoilov
- (North Macedonia) Zlatko Mojsoski
- (North Macedonia) Velko Markoski
- (North Macedonia) Milan Levov
- (North Macedonia) Davor Palevski

==== Notable former coaches ====
- (North Macedonia) Andon Boshkovski
- (North Macedonia) Pepi Manaskov
