= GRK Tikveš =

Handball club in Kavadarci, North Macedonia

(North Macedonia) Тиквеш HC Tikvesh
- Full name: Gradski Rakometen Klub Tikvesh
- Founded: 1955
- Arena: Jasmin Sports Hall
- Capacity: 3,500
- Head coach: Kristijan Grčevski
- League: Macedonian Super Liga
- 2026–27: ?
- Club colours
Home	Away

Active departments of Sports Club Tikvesh
Handball	Basketball	Football

GRK Tikvesh (Macedonian: ГРК Тиквеш), formerly known as GRK Lozari, is a handball club from Kavadarci, North Macedonia. Tikves is a member of the VIP Super league.

== History ==
The Tikvesh Club was established in 1955 by the Tikvesh Sports Association. The first coach was Lazar Lalkov, the initiators of the formation of the club besides Lalkov were also Gjoko Mukaetov and Dobre Stavrov, founders of the handball game in Kavadarci. Tikvesh played their first season in the 1955 Championship when they finished second behind Rabotnichki.

The club was four times champion of Macedonia (1962, 1964, 1972, 1976), three times winner of the Macedonian Cup (1958, 1963 and 1970). Tikves also played in the Second League in the former Federal league when in its first appearance in 1971 placed at the seventh place. Tikves also played in the Inter-Republic League in the 1980–81 season, winning second place.

Notable players from this period were Pane Malinkov, brothers Simon and Jovan Kjurchievi, Jordan Ilkov, brothers Angjushevi, Miodrag Micajkov, Zarkov, Zafirov, the goalkeeper Rizov, Kamchev, Maslarkov.

They competed in the First League, second tier handball league. They won the championship in season 2019-20 and qualified for the VIP Super League. This season they compete in the Top Division.

- EHF Cup After Finishing 4 th in the season 2022-23 of the top Flight Division HC Tikvesh manage to qualify for the EHF Cup competition.

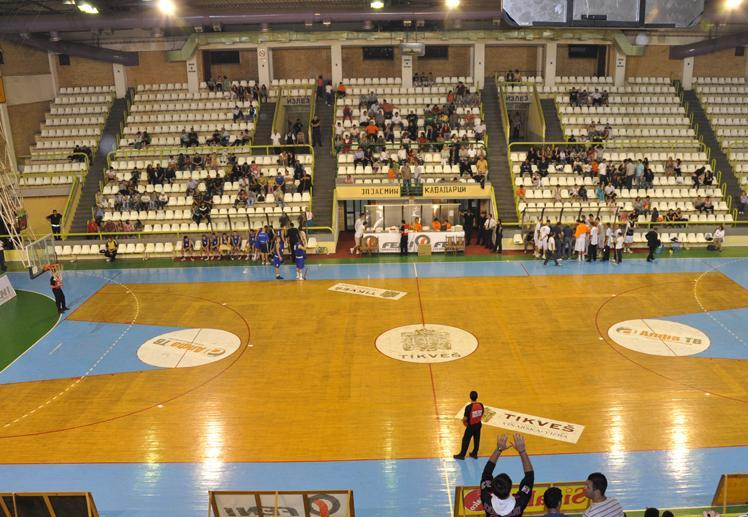
Jasmin Arena

== Home ground ==
Jasmin Sports Arena is a multi-purpose indoor sports arena located in Kavadarci, Macedonia and seats 3,500 spectators.

The arena is used for basketball by KK Feni Industries.In May 2011, it hosted the Final Four of the Balkan International Basketball League. It has also been used for concerts and handball by GRK Tikveš.

== Accomplishment (North Macedonia) ==
Macedonian Champions

(4) 1962,1964,1972, 1976

Cup Winners

(3) 1958,1963,1970

== Team ==
=== Current squad ===
Squad for the 2026–27 season

Goalkeepers

- 12 (North Macedonia) Marjan Velkov
- 1 (North Macedonia) Blashko Bakev
- 82 (North Macedonia) Bojan Solev

Left Wingers

- 33 (North Macedonia) Dimitar Kocev
- 41 (North Macedonia) Dimitrij Angelov

Right Wingers

- 2 (North Macedonia) Djulijano Hristovski
- 8 (Montenegro) Balša Cejović

Line players

- 5 (North Macedonia) Stefan Jovevski
- 45 (North Macedonia) Aleksandar Simonovski
- 9 (North Macedonia) Borjan Cekovski
- 14 (Argentina) Franco Daniel Gavidia

Left Backs

- 8 (North Macedonia) Matej Petreski
- 77 (North Macedonia) Toše Ončev
- 96 (Tunisia) Mohamed Aziz Ben Mahfoudh

Central Backs

- 23 (North Macedonia) Miki Lazov
- 29 (North Macedonia) Martin Todorov
- 34 (Serbia) Strahinja Simić
- 20 (North Macedonia) Tomislav Dimkovski

Right Backs

- 19 (North Macedonia) Martin Dimovski
- 98 (Tunisia) Hazem Ghabara

=== Staff ===
==== Professional staff ====
Position	Name
Head coach	(North Macedonia) Kristijan Grcevski
Assistant coach	(North Macedonia) Boro Georgiev
Conditioning coach	(North Macedonia) Mladen Todorovski
Doctor	(North Macedonia) Filip Dimitriev

=== Transfers ===
Transfers for the 2026–27 season

Joining

- (Tunisia) Mohamed Aziz Ben Mahfoudh (LB) from (North Macedonia) RK Eurofarm Pelister 2
- (North Macedonia) Toše Ončev (LB) from (North Macedonia) MRK Kumanovo
- (North Macedonia) Borjan Cekovski (LP) from (North Macedonia) MRK Kumanovo
- (North Macedonia) Tomislav Dimkovski (CB) from (North Macedonia) RK Tineks Prolet
- (North Macedonia) Bojan Solev (GK) (from (North Macedonia) RK Tineks Prolet)

Leaving

- (Montenegro) Bogdan Mijušković (LB) to (Israel) Bnei Herzliya
- (Montenegro) Vasilije Pečurica (GK) to (Montenegro) RK Budvanska rivijera
- (North Macedonia) Tomche Stojanovski (LB) to (Italy) Handball Sassari
- (North Macedonia) Blagoj Panov (GK) (to (North Macedonia) RK Mladost 1977)
- (North Macedonia) Petar Cvetkovski (CB) (to (North Macedonia) RK Ilinden)
- (North Macedonia) Stefan Atanasovski (P) (to ?)

=== Transfer History ===
Transfers for the 2025–26 season

Joining

- (Montenegro) Vasilije Pečurica (GK) from (North Macedonia) RK Eurofarm Pelister 2
- (North Macedonia) Tomče Stojanovski (LB) from (North Macedonia) RK Vardar
- (North Macedonia) Petar Cvetkovski (CB) from (North Macedonia) HC Butel Skopje
- (Egypt) Mohamed Elazhary (RB) from (Egypt) Zamalek SC
- (Portugal) Augusto Aranda (RB) from (France) CS Vesoul
- (Montenegro) Balša Cejović (RW) from (Kosovo) KH Besa Famgas
- (Slovenia) Jan Tajnik (P) from (France) Dijon Métropole Handball
- (North Macedonia) Stefan Atanasovski (P) from (North Macedonia) RK Struga
- (Georgia (country)) Giorgi Grishikashvili (P) from (Georgia (country)) HC Pegasi

Leaving

- (Serbia) Igor Arsić (GK) to (Greece) A.C. PAOK
- (North Macedonia) Martin Manaskov (LB) to (Austria) Alpla HC Hard
- (Nigeria) Ani Obinna (RB) to (France) Pau Billère Handball
- (Egypt) Mohamed Elazhary (RB) to (Italy) SSV Brixen Handball
- (North Macedonia) Evgenij Temelkoski (RW) to (Greece) A.C. PAOK
- (Portugal) Augusto Aranda (RB) to ?
- (North Macedonia) Kristijan Anastasovski (P) to (North Macedonia) RK Vardar
- (Slovenia) Jan Tajnik (P) to (Slovenia) RK Frankstahl Radovljica
- (Georgia (country)) Giorgi Grishikashvili (P) to ?
