= RK Prespa =

Macedonian handball club

РК Преспа RK Prespa
- Full name: Rakometen Klub Prespa Resen
- Arena: Sport Hall Zoran Stojanovski, Resen
- Capacity: 1,500
- President: Ilce Kotevski
- Head coach: Ivanco Angelkovski
- League: VIP Super League
- 2012–13: 9th
- Club colours
Home	Away

RK Prespa (HC Prespa) (Macedonian: РК Преспа) is a team handball club from Resen, North Macedonia. The team won a Macedonian Handball Championship in the 1996–97 season under the name Jafa Promet Resen. They compete in the Macedonian Handball Super League.

== Accomplishments ==
- Macedonian Handball Super League

Winners (1): 1996–97

- EHF Champions League Group Stage: 1

1997–98

- EHF Cup 1/8 Final: 1

1996–97
