= RK Borec =

Team handball club from Veles, Republic of Macedonia

(North Macedonia) HC Borec
- Full name: Rakometen klub Borec Veles
- Founded: 1960
- Arena: Gemidžii, Veles
- Capacity: 5,000
- Head coach: Vasil Vasilev
- League: VIP Super League
- 2019-20: 5th
- Club colours
Home	Away

RK Borec (HC Borec) (Macedonian: РК Борец) is a team handball club from Veles, North Macedonia. In the 1990s they had their biggest success winning the League and one Cup title. They compete in the Macedonian Handball Super League.

Noted Macedonian handball player Pepi Manaskov started his career at RK Borec.

== Accomplishments ==
=== Domestic competitions (North Macedonia) ===
- Macedonian Handball Super League

Winners (4): 1965,1967, 1985,1995

- Macedonian Handball Cup

Winners (2): 1968,1994

=== European competitions (European Union) ===
- EHF Champions League 1/16 Final: 1

1995-96

- EHF Cup Winners' Cup 1/8 Final: 1

1994-95
