= Boro Čurlevski Sports Hall =

Coordinates: 41°01′20″N 21°20′14″E

Sports Hall "Boro Churlevski" Спортска сала „Боро Чурлевски“
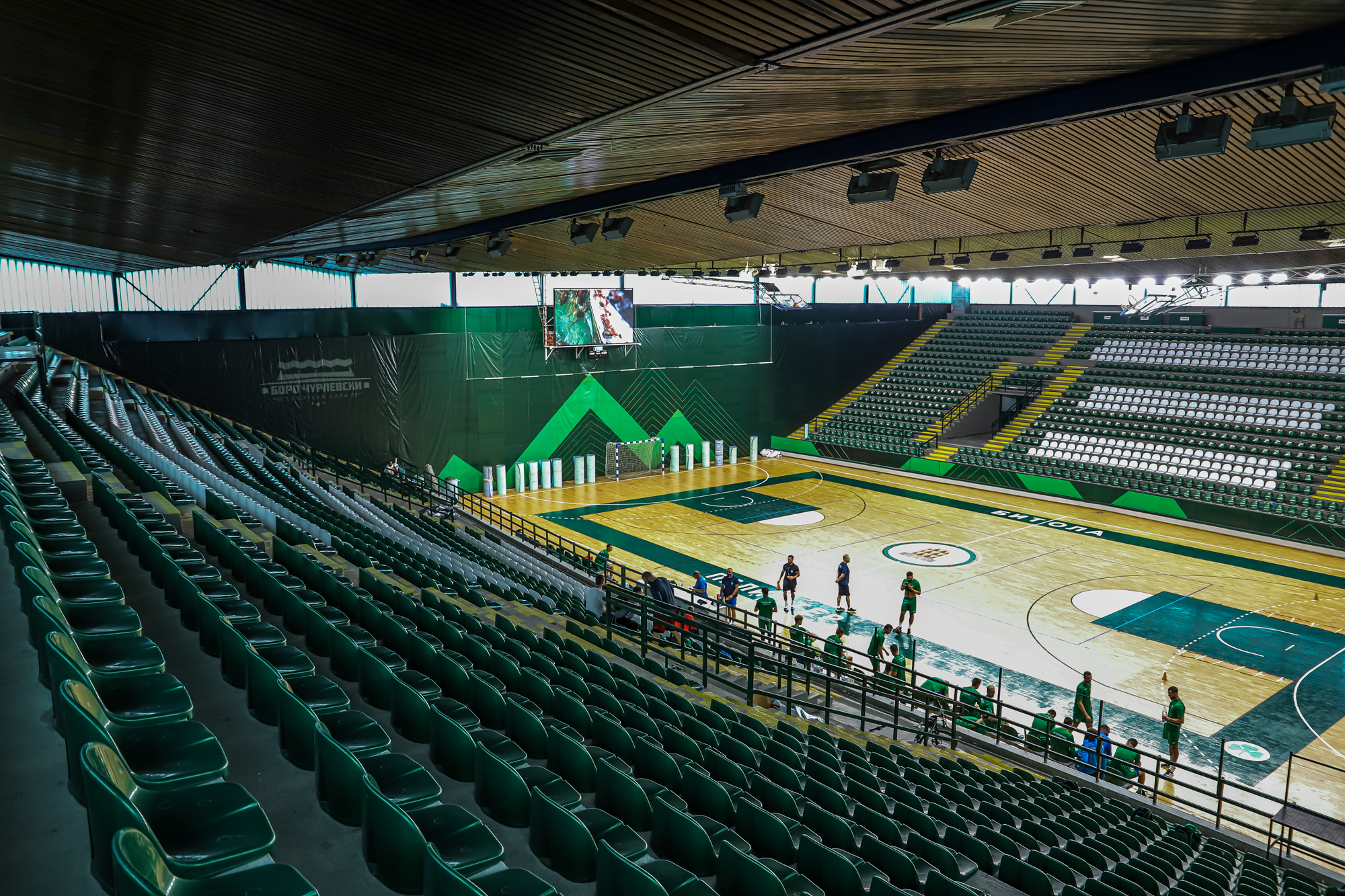
- Interactive map of Sports Hall "Boro Churlevski"; Спортска сала „Боро Чурлевски“
- Location: Bitola, North Macedonia
- Owner: Bitola Municipality
- Capacity: 3.500

Construction
- Opened: 1975
- Renovated: 2017

Tenant
- RK Eurofarm Pelister / KK Pelister

Sports hall "Boro Churlevski", (Macedonian: Спортска сала „Боро Чурлевски“;), formerly known as Sports hall "Mladost" (Macedonian: Спортска сала „Младост“;) is a multi-purpose sports arena located in Bitola, North Macedonia. It was built in 1975 by the citizens of Bitola and is mainly used for handball by RK Eurofarm Pelister, and for basketball by KK Pelister. There is also room for bowling and table tennis plus it has been used for concerts.

The Arena hosted the 2007 Macedonian Basketball Cup. This sports hall was the largest on the territory of Republic Macedonia before the construction of the Boris Trajkovski Sports Center in Skopje.

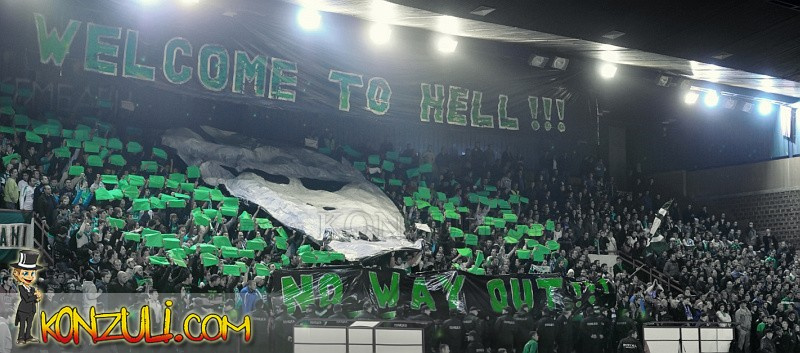
Interior of Churlevski Arena

== Renovation 2009 ==
On 21 July 2009, the arena is undergoing renovation. A new parquet floor will be installed along with new seats. The locker rooms will also be updated to meet EHF standards. Total cost of the project is about €30,000.

== Renovation of interior ==
In January 2017, renovation of interior of the hall started. The renovation covered the floor, the stands, a new score board and a new heating system. The first match in the renovated arena was played on 6 April 2017 with the match between RK Pelister and RK Metalurg in the second round of the handball Super League play-off.

== Renaming ==
At the end of July 2018, the name of the hall was changed to "Boro Churlevski", in honor of the late Boro Churlevski, a former handball player from Bitola.

- Handball: 3,500
- Basketball: 4,000
- Concerts: 6,500 (with standing public ramp)

== Concerts ==
- Parni Valjak
- Lepa Brena
- Plavi orkestar
- Crvena jabuka
- Hari Mata Hari
- Riblja Čorba
- Leb i sol
- Bajaga i Instruktori
- Novi fosili
- Bijelo Dugme
- Galija
- YU grupa
- Kerber
