= MRK Kumanovo =

Macedonian handball club

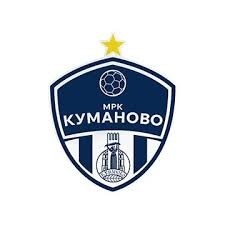
- Full name: Maski Rakometen Klub Kumanovo
- Arena: Sports Hall Kumanovo
- Capacity: 5,000
- President: Daniel Trajcevski
- Head coach: Aleksandar Radosavljevic
- League: Macedonian Super League
- 2026-27: ?
- Club colours
Home	Away

MRK Kumanovo (Macedonian: МРК Куманово) is a handball club from Kumanovo, North Macedonia. They compete in the Macedonian Handball Super League, they are the winners of the first ever Macedonian Handball Cup in 1993 and have played in the qualifications for the EHF Cup.

== Accomplishments ==
=== Domestic competitions (North Macedonia) ===
Champions : 1990
Cup Winners : 1993

=== European competitions (European Union) ===
- EHF Cup Winners' Cup 1/8 Final: 1 1993-94

== Team ==
=== Current squad ===
Squad for the 2026–2027 season

Goalkeepers

- 1 (North Macedonia) Marko Mladenovikj
- 12 (North Macedonia) Grigor Trajkovski
- 96 (North Macedonia) Goran Cavejski

Left Wingers

- 4 (North Macedonia) Ivan Dimitrov
- 8 (North Macedonia) David Cvetkovski (c)

Right Wingers

- 7 (North Macedonia) Naum Kostov
- 19 (North Macedonia) Darian Nikolovski

Line players

- 2 (North Macedonia) Marko Trajkovski
- 5 (North Macedonia) Hristijan Vujichevski
- 15 (North Macedonia) Matej Novakovski
- 55 (Brazil) Emmanuel Gustavo Ferreira Paiva

Left Backs

- 10 (North Macedonia) Tino Stojanovski
- 17 (Egypt) Оmar Mamdouh

Central Backs

- 3 (North Macedonia) Filip Mechkaroski
- 94 (Egypt) Hamza Mamdouh Ibrahim

Right Backs

- 30 (Egypt) Kareem Mohamed
- 27 (North Macedonia) Bojan Gichev
- 77 (Bulgaria) Valentin Mitev

=== Transfers ===
Transfers for the 2026–27 season

Joining

- (North Macedonia) Naum Kostov (RW) from (North Macedonia) RK Struga
- (North Macedonia) Marko Trajkovski (LP) from (North Macedonia) RK Tineks Prolet
- (North Macedonia) Matej Novakovski (LP) from (North Macedonia) HC Butel Skopje
- (North Macedonia) Filip Mechkaroski (CB) (from (North Macedonia) RK Struga)
- (Egypt) Hamza Mamdouh Ibrahim (CB) (from (Egypt) El Obour)
- (North Macedonia) Bojan Gičev (RB) (from (North Macedonia) RK Eurofarm Pelister 2)

Leaving

- (North Macedonia) Toše Ončev (LB) to (North Macedonia) GRK Tikveš
- (North Macedonia) Borjan Cekovski (LP) to (North Macedonia) GRK Tikveš
- (North Macedonia) Hristijan Krstanoski (LB) to (North Macedonia) RK Struga
- (North Macedonia) David Dimevski (LB) to RK Eurofarm Pelister 2
- (North Macedonia) Aleksandar Stojkov (RW) to (North Macedonia) RK Eurofarm Pelister 2
- (North Macedonia) Martin Ivanov (RW) (to (North Macedonia) RK Mladost 1977)

== Staff ==
=== Professional staff ===
Position	Name
Head coach	(Serbia) Aleksandar Radosavljevic
Assistant coach	(North Macedonia) Miodrag Jovanovski
Goalkeeping coach	(North Macedonia) Goran Cavejski
Physiotherapists	(North Macedonia) Ilina Zlatanovska
Doctor	(North Macedonia) Nikola Stefanovski
Doctor	(North Macedonia) Darko Karanfilovski

=== Management ===
Position	Name
President	(North Macedonia) Daniel Trajcevski
Director	(North Macedonia) Mishko Nikolovski
Sporting Director	(North Macedonia) Ljubisha Dimkovski
Spokesman	(North Macedonia) Boshko Tasic
Secretary	(North Macedonia) Boban Trajkovski-Zike
Photographer	(North Macedonia) Tijana Dodevska
Administrator	(North Macedonia) Marija Tomikj
Official representative of the club	(North Macedonia) Mihajlo Paunovic
Official representative of the club	(North Macedonia) Perica Kuzmanovski

== Home ground ==
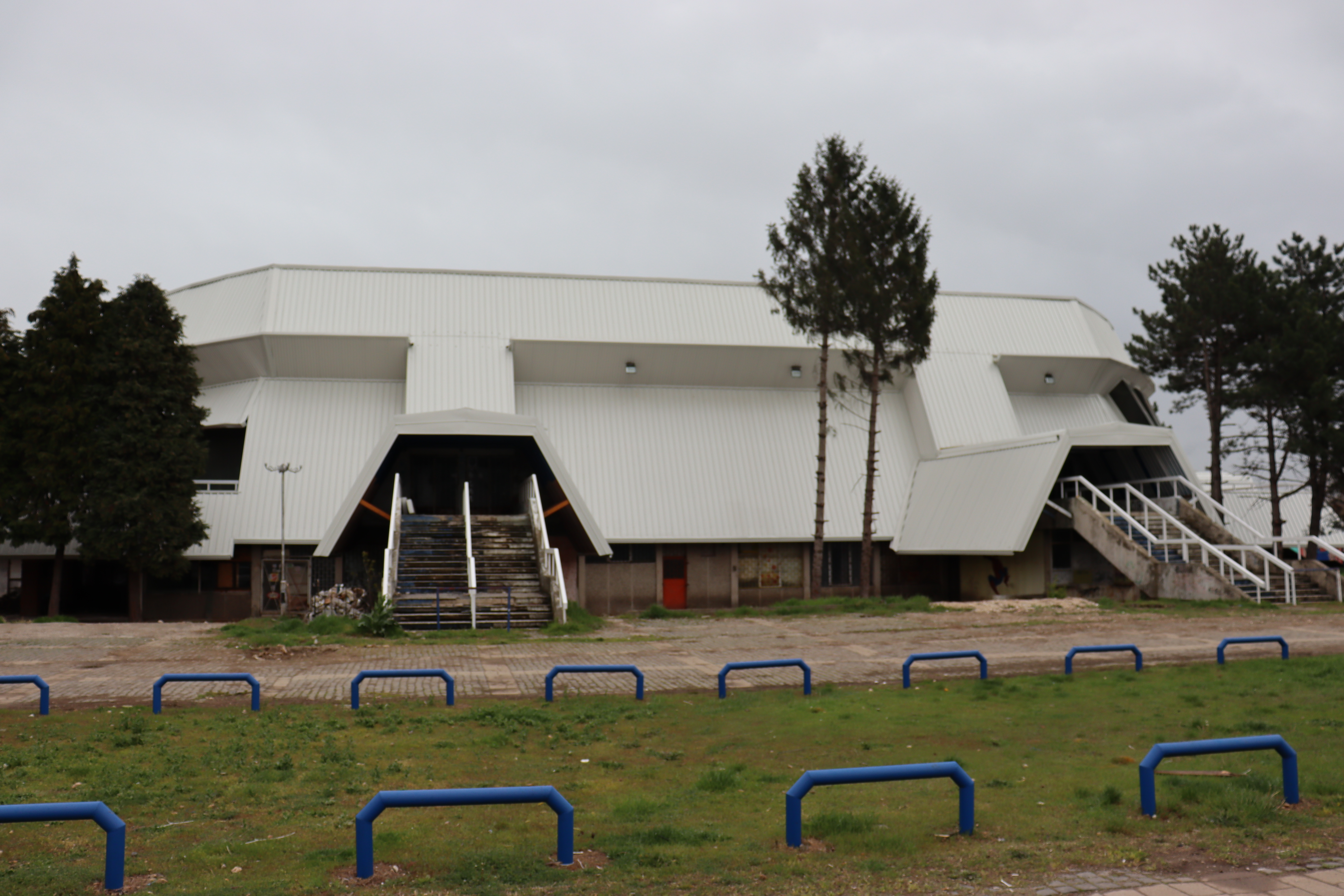

Sports Hall Kumanovo is an indoor sport venue located in Kumanovo. The hall has capacity of 6,500 seats and was built in 1980.

It is the biggest indoor sport hall in Kumanovo, where competitions of basketball, indoor soccer, handball, volleyball and boxing matches are held.
