= Macedonian Handball Super League =

Top-tier team handball competition in North Macedonia

- Current season, competition or edition: 2024–25 Macedonian Handball Super League
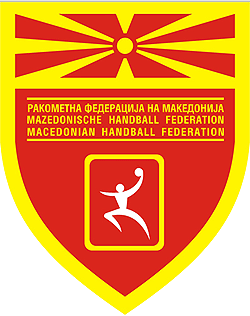
- Sport: Handball
- Founded: 1992
- No. of teams: 12
- Country: North Macedonia
- Confederation: EHF
- Most recent champion: RK Eurofarm Pelister
- Most titles: Vardar (15)
- Broadcaster: MRT
- International cups: EHF Champions League; EHF European League; EHF European Cup
- Website: macedoniahandball.com.mk

The Macedonian Handball Super League (Macedonian: Ракометна Супер Лига на Македонија), is the top-tier team handball competition in North Macedonia. As of 2018, the Macedonian Handball Federation was ranked 8th in the world.

== Current teams ==
=== Teams for season 2024–25 ===
Location of teams in 2024–25 Super League

==== Handball League ====
- RK Alkaloid
- GRK Tikveš
- GRK Ohrid
- RK Struga
- MRK Kumanovo
- RK Vardar 1961
- RK Eurofarm Pelister
- RK Prolet 62
- RK Butel Skopje
- RK Prilep
- RK Fruit Lend Borec
- RK Radovish

== List of champions ==
- 1992–93 : Pelister
- 1993–94 : Pelister
- 1994–95 : Borec
- 1995–96 : Pelister
- 1996–97 : Prespa
- 1997–98 : Pelister
- 1998–99 : Vardar
- 1999–00 : Pelister
- 2000–01 : Vardar
- 2001–02 : Vardar
- 2002–03 : Vardar
- 2003–04 : Vardar
- 2004–05 : Pelister
- 2005–06 : Metalurg
- 2006–07 : Vardar
- 2007–08 : Metalurg
- 2008–09 : Vardar
- 2009–10 : Metalurg
- 2010–11 : Metalurg
- 2011–12 : Metalurg
- 2012–13 : Vardar
- 2013–14 : Metalurg
- 2014–15 : Vardar
- 2015–16 : Vardar
- 2016–17 : Vardar
- 2017–18 : Vardar
- 2018–19 : Vardar
- 2019-20 : No Play Off due to COVID
- 2020–21 : Vardar
- 2021–22 : Vardar
- 2022–23 : Pelister
- 2023–24 : Pelister
- 2024–25 : Pelister
- 2025–26 : Vardar

== Performances ==
=== Clubs ===
Club	Titles	Seasons
Vardar	16	1999, 2001, 2002, 2003, 2004, 2007, 2009, 2013, 2015, 2016, 2017, 2018, 2019, 2021, 2022,2026
Pelister	9	1993, 1994, 1996, 1998, 2000, 2005, 2023, 2024, 2025
Metalurg	6	2006, 2008, 2010, 2011, 2012, 2014
Borec	1	1995
Prespa	1	1997

=== Macedonian Republic League ===
- 1953 HC Rabotnichki
- 1954 HC Rabotnichki
- 1955 HC Rabotnichki
- 1956 HC Rabotnichki
- 1957 HC Rabotnichki
- 1958 HC Rabotnichki
- 1959 HC Grafichar
- 1960 HC Grafichar
- 1961 HC Pelister
- 1962 HC Tikvesh
- 1963 HC Rabotnichki
- 1964 HC Tikvesh
- 1965 RK Borec
- 1966 HC Pelister
- 1967 RK Borec
- 1968 HC Pelister
- 1969 HC Pelister
- 1970 HC Pelister
- 1971 HC Pelister
- 1972 HC Tikvesh
- 1973 HC Prolet
- 1974 HC Prolet
- 1975 HC Vardar
- 1976 HC Tikvesh
- 1977 HC Elektromontazha
- 1978 HC Elektromontazha
- 1979 HC Pelister
- 1980 HC Metalurg
- 1981 HC Pelister
- 1982 HC Struga
- 1983 HC Elektromontazha
- 1984 HC Rabotnichki
- 1985 HC Borec
- 1986 HC Metalurg
- 1987 HC Prilep
- 1988 HC Ovche Pole
- 1989 HC Prilep
- 1990 HC Kumanovo
- 1991 HC Strumica
- 1992 HC Metalurg

== EHF coefficients ==
The following data indicates Macedonian coefficient rankings between European handball leagues.

View source data.

Country ranking

EHF League Ranking for 2020/21 season:

- 1. (1) (France) LNH Division 1 (139.33)
- 2. (2) (Germany) Handball-Bundesliga (132.83)
- 3. (7) (North Macedonia) Macedonian Handball Super League (115.00)
- 4. (4) (Hungary) Nemzeti Bajnokság I (99.83)
- 5. (3) (Spain) Liga ASOBAL (96.17)

Club ranking

EHF Club Ranking as of 25 September 2025:

- 24. (35) Eurofarm Pelister (159)
- 28. (30) Alkaloid (143)
- 50. (56) Vardar (92)
- 135. (148) Tikveš (28)
- 150. (165) Ohrid (24)

== See also ==
- Macedonian Handball Cup
