= 2018–19 EHF Cup group stage =

This article describes the group stage of the 2018–19 EHF Cup, a men's handball competition.

== Draw ==
The draw of the EHF Cup group stage took place on Thursday, 29 November 2018. The 16 teams allocated into four pots were drawn into four groups of four teams.

== Seedings ==
The seedings were announced on 26 November 2018.

Pot 1	Pot 2	Pot 3	Pot 4
(Spain) Fraikin Granollers (Germany) Füchse Berlin (Germany) TSV Hannover-Burgdorf (Portugal) FC Porto	(Denmark) TTH Holstebro (Spain) Logroño La Rioja (Hungary) Tatabánya (Poland) Azoty-Puławy	(Spain) Liberbank Ciudad Encantada (France) Saint-Raphaël Var Handball (Germany) THW Kiel (North Macedonia) Eurofarm Rabotnik	(Croatia) Nexe (Denmark) GOG Håndbold (Hungary) Balatonfüredi (Romania) Dobrogea Sud Constanța

== Format ==
In each group, teams will play against each other in a double round-robin format, with home and away matches. After completion of the group stage matches, the top teams and the best three second-placed teams advance to the Quarter-finals. Teams are not able to face opponents from the same country in the group.

== Tiebreakers ==
In the group stage, teams will be ranked according to points (2 points for a win, 1 point for a draw, 0 points for a loss). After completion of the group stage, if two or more teams had scored the same number of points, the ranking will be determined as follows:

1. Highest number of points in matches between the teams directly involved;
2. Superior goal difference in matches between the teams directly involved;
3. Highest number of goals scored in matches between the teams directly involved (or in the away match in case of a two-team tie);
4. Superior goal difference in all matches of the group;
5. Highest number of plus goals in all matches of the group;

If the ranking of one of these teams is determined, the above criteria are consecutively followed until the ranking of all teams is determined. If no ranking can be determined, a decision shall be obtained by EHF through drawing of lots.

== Groups ==
The matchdays will be 9–10 February, 16–17 February, 23–24 February, 2–3 March, 23–24 March and 30–31 March 2019.

=== Group A ===
Pos	Team	Pld	W	D	L	GF	GA	GD	Pts	Qualification
1	(Germany) Füchse Berlin	6	5	0	1	192	166	+26	10	Knockout stage
2	(France) Saint-Raphaël Var Handball	6	4	0	2	180	169	+11	8	Ranking of the second-placed teams
3	(Spain) Logroño La Rioja	6	2	0	4	174	180	−6	4	
4	(Hungary) Balatonfüredi	6	1	0	5	156	187	−31	2	

Source: EHF

9 February 2019; 21:15	Logroño La Rioja (Spain)	29–24	(Hungary) Balatonfüredi	Palacio de los Deportes de La Rioja, Logroño; Attendance: 1,100; Referees: Tzaferopoulos, Bethmann (GRE)
9 February 2019; 21:15	Muñoz 6	(11–9)	Szöllősi 8	Palacio de los Deportes de La Rioja, Logroño; Attendance: 1,100; Referees: Tzaferopoulos, Bethmann (GRE)
9 February 2019; 21:15	2× (yellow card) 5× (suspension)	Report	3× (yellow card) 2× (suspension)	Palacio de los Deportes de La Rioja, Logroño; Attendance: 1,100; Referees: Tzaferopoulos, Bethmann (GRE)

10 February 2019; 15:00	Füchse Berlin (Germany)	33–29	(France) Saint-Raphaël Var Handball	Max-Schmeling-Halle, Berlin; Attendance: 6,351; Referees: Stark, Ştefan (ROU)
10 February 2019; 15:00	Drux, Semisch 7	(17–15)	Barachet 7	Max-Schmeling-Halle, Berlin; Attendance: 6,351; Referees: Stark, Ştefan (ROU)
10 February 2019; 15:00	4× (yellow card) 5× (suspension)	Report	2× (yellow card) 4× (suspension)	Max-Schmeling-Halle, Berlin; Attendance: 6,351; Referees: Stark, Ştefan (ROU)

14 February 2019; 18:00	Balatonfüredi (Hungary)	24–29	(Germany) Füchse Berlin	Veszprém Aréna, Veszprém; Attendance: 1,000; Referees: Leszczyński, Piechota (POL)
14 February 2019; 18:00	Máthé 9	(14–16)	Elísson 7	Veszprém Aréna, Veszprém; Attendance: 1,000; Referees: Leszczyński, Piechota (POL)
14 February 2019; 18:00	2× (yellow card) 4× (suspension)	Report	3× (yellow card) 6× (suspension)	Veszprém Aréna, Veszprém; Attendance: 1,000; Referees: Leszczyński, Piechota (POL)

16 February 2019; 20:00	Saint-Raphaël Var Handball (France)	30–26	(Spain) Logroño La Rioja	Palais des Sports JF Krakowski, Saint-Raphaël; Attendance: 1,266; Referees: Mitrevski, Todorovski (MKD)
16 February 2019; 20:00	Jildenbäck 8	(14–15)	Ilić 7	Palais des Sports JF Krakowski, Saint-Raphaël; Attendance: 1,266; Referees: Mitrevski, Todorovski (MKD)
16 February 2019; 20:00	2× (yellow card) 3× (suspension)	Report	2× (yellow card) 4× (suspension)	Palais des Sports JF Krakowski, Saint-Raphaël; Attendance: 1,266; Referees: Mitrevski, Todorovski (MKD)

23 February 2019; 13:00	Balatonfüredi (Hungary)	27–32	(France) Saint-Raphaël Var Handball	Veszprém Aréna, Veszprém; Attendance: 1,200; Referees: Panayides, Andreou (CYP)
23 February 2019; 13:00	Szöllősi 8	(18–16)	Caucheteux 10	Veszprém Aréna, Veszprém; Attendance: 1,200; Referees: Panayides, Andreou (CYP)
23 February 2019; 13:00	2× (yellow card) 3× (suspension)	Report	2× (yellow card) 6× (suspension) 1× (red card)	Veszprém Aréna, Veszprém; Attendance: 1,200; Referees: Panayides, Andreou (CYP)

23 February 2019; 19:30	Logroño La Rioja (Spain)	29–34	(Germany) Füchse Berlin	Palacio de los Deportes de La Rioja, Logroño; Attendance: 2,500; Referees: Jurinović, Mrvica (CRO)
23 February 2019; 19:30	Scott 9	(16–15)	Lindberg 7	Palacio de los Deportes de La Rioja, Logroño; Attendance: 2,500; Referees: Jurinović, Mrvica (CRO)
23 February 2019; 19:30	3× (yellow card) 1× (suspension)	Report	3× (yellow card) 4× (suspension)	Palacio de los Deportes de La Rioja, Logroño; Attendance: 2,500; Referees: Jurinović, Mrvica (CRO)

3 March 2019; 19:00	Füchse Berlin (Germany)	29–27	(Spain) Logroño La Rioja	Max-Schmeling-Halle, Berlin; Attendance: 4,573; Referees: Canbro, Kliko (SWE)
3 March 2019; 19:00	Lindberg 8	(13–14)	Muñoz 7	Max-Schmeling-Halle, Berlin; Attendance: 4,573; Referees: Canbro, Kliko (SWE)
3 March 2019; 19:00	3× (yellow card) 5× (suspension)	Report	2× (yellow card) 4× (suspension) 2× (red card)	Max-Schmeling-Halle, Berlin; Attendance: 4,573; Referees: Canbro, Kliko (SWE)

3 March 2019; 19:00	Saint-Raphaël Var Handball (France)	27–23	(Hungary) Balatonfüredi	Palais des Sports JF Krakowski, Saint-Raphaël; Attendance: 1,025; Referees: Budzák, Záhradník (SVK)
3 March 2019; 19:00	Caucheteux, Gayduchenko 8	(13–12)	Szita 6	Palais des Sports JF Krakowski, Saint-Raphaël; Attendance: 1,025; Referees: Budzák, Záhradník (SVK)
3 March 2019; 19:00	2× (yellow card) 2× (suspension)	Report	1× (yellow card) 5× (suspension)	Palais des Sports JF Krakowski, Saint-Raphaël; Attendance: 1,025; Referees: Budzák, Záhradník (SVK)

23 March 2019; 20:00	Saint-Raphaël Var Handball (France)	34–31	(Germany) Füchse Berlin	Palais des Sports JF Krakowski, Saint-Raphaël; Attendance: 1,191; Referees: Lah, Sok (SVN)
23 March 2019; 20:00	three players 6	(18–15)	Lindberg 7	Palais des Sports JF Krakowski, Saint-Raphaël; Attendance: 1,191; Referees: Lah, Sok (SVN)
23 March 2019; 20:00	2× (yellow card) 3× (suspension)	Report	4× (suspension)	Palais des Sports JF Krakowski, Saint-Raphaël; Attendance: 1,191; Referees: Lah, Sok (SVN)

24 March 2019; 14:00	Balatonfüredi (Hungary)	35–34	(Spain) Logroño La Rioja	Veszprém Aréna, Veszprém; Attendance: 500; Referees: Stark, Ştefan (ROU)
24 March 2019; 14:00	Máthé 10	(15–16)	Ilić 8	Veszprém Aréna, Veszprém; Attendance: 500; Referees: Stark, Ştefan (ROU)
24 March 2019; 14:00	3× (yellow card) 4× (suspension)	Report	2× (yellow card) 4× (suspension) 1× (red card)	Veszprém Aréna, Veszprém; Attendance: 500; Referees: Stark, Ştefan (ROU)

30 March 2019; 19:30	Logroño La Rioja (Spain)	29–28	(France) Saint-Raphaël Var Handball	Palacio de los Deportes de La Rioja, Logroño; Attendance: 1,800; Referees: Martins, Martins (POR)
30 March 2019; 19:30	three players 4	(15–14)	Șimicu 7	Palacio de los Deportes de La Rioja, Logroño; Attendance: 1,800; Referees: Martins, Martins (POR)
30 March 2019; 19:30	1× (yellow card) 4× (suspension)	Report	3× (yellow card) 6× (suspension)	Palacio de los Deportes de La Rioja, Logroño; Attendance: 1,800; Referees: Martins, Martins (POR)

31 March 2019; 16:00	Füchse Berlin (Germany)	36–23	(Hungary) Balatonfüredi	Max-Schmeling-Halle, Berlin; Attendance: 9,000; Referees: Peturrson, Þrastarson (ISL)
31 March 2019; 16:00	Zachrisson 10	(16–14)	Semenov 7	Max-Schmeling-Halle, Berlin; Attendance: 9,000; Referees: Peturrson, Þrastarson (ISL)
31 March 2019; 16:00	2× (yellow card) 3× (suspension)	Report	2× (yellow card) 3× (suspension)	Max-Schmeling-Halle, Berlin; Attendance: 9,000; Referees: Peturrson, Þrastarson (ISL)

=== Group B ===
Pos	Team	Pld	W	D	L	GF	GA	GD	Pts	Qualification
1	(Hungary) Tatabánya	6	4	1	1	172	154	+18	9	Knockout stage
2	(Germany) TSV Hannover-Burgdorf	6	3	1	2	162	144	+18	7	Ranking of the second-placed teams
3	(Croatia) Nexe	6	3	0	3	156	160	−4	6	
4	(North Macedonia) Eurofarm Rabotnik	6	1	0	5	133	165	−32	2	

Source: EHF

8 February 2019; 19:00	Tatabánya (Hungary)	27–28	(Croatia) Nexe	Audi Aréna, Győr; Attendance: 2,300; Referees: Canbro, Kliko (SWE)
8 February 2019; 19:00	Vujović 8	(18–14)	Gadža, Jelinić 6	Audi Aréna, Győr; Attendance: 2,300; Referees: Canbro, Kliko (SWE)
8 February 2019; 19:00	3× (yellow card) 4× (suspension)	Report	3× (yellow card) 6× (suspension)	Audi Aréna, Győr; Attendance: 2,300; Referees: Canbro, Kliko (SWE)

9 February 2019; 19:30	TSV Hannover-Burgdorf (Germany)	24–21	(North Macedonia) Eurofarm Rabotnik	Swiss Life Hall, Hanover; Attendance: 3,514; Referees: Lindenbaum, Laron (ISR)
9 February 2019; 19:30	Olsen 7	(16–14)	Građan, Ostroushko 5	Swiss Life Hall, Hanover; Attendance: 3,514; Referees: Lindenbaum, Laron (ISR)
9 February 2019; 19:30	1× (yellow card) 4× (suspension)	Report	3× (yellow card) 1× (suspension)	Swiss Life Hall, Hanover; Attendance: 3,514; Referees: Lindenbaum, Laron (ISR)

16 February 2019; 19:30	Nexe (Croatia)	29–25	(Germany) TSV Hannover-Burgdorf	Sportska dvorana kralja Tomislava, Našice; Attendance: 2,000; Referees: Mandák, Rudinský (SVK)
16 February 2019; 19:30	three players 5	(14–9)	Kastening 8	Sportska dvorana kralja Tomislava, Našice; Attendance: 2,000; Referees: Mandák, Rudinský (SVK)
16 February 2019; 19:30	3× (yellow card) 5× (suspension) 1× (red card)	Report	3× (yellow card) 6× (suspension)	Sportska dvorana kralja Tomislava, Našice; Attendance: 2,000; Referees: Mandák, Rudinský (SVK)

17 February 2019; 19:00	Eurofarm Rabotnik (North Macedonia)	21–31	(Hungary) Tatabánya	Sports Hall Mladost, Bitola; Attendance: 3,000; Referees: Katsikis, Michailidis (GRE)
17 February 2019; 19:00	Ostroushko 9	(11–14)	Rosta 6	Sports Hall Mladost, Bitola; Attendance: 3,000; Referees: Katsikis, Michailidis (GRE)
17 February 2019; 19:00	2× (yellow card) 2× (suspension) 1× (red card)	Report	3× (yellow card) 3× (suspension)	Sports Hall Mladost, Bitola; Attendance: 3,000; Referees: Katsikis, Michailidis (GRE)

23 February 2019; 19:30	Nexe (Croatia)	23–18	(North Macedonia) Eurofarm Rabotnik	Sportska dvorana kralja Tomislava, Našice; Attendance: 2,000; Referees: Vitaku, Vitaku (KOS)
23 February 2019; 19:30	Šipić 7	(10–10)	Ostroushko 6	Sportska dvorana kralja Tomislava, Našice; Attendance: 2,000; Referees: Vitaku, Vitaku (KOS)
23 February 2019; 19:30	3× (yellow card) 2× (suspension)	Report	3× (yellow card) 2× (suspension)	Sportska dvorana kralja Tomislava, Našice; Attendance: 2,000; Referees: Vitaku, Vitaku (KOS)

24 February 2019; 13:00	Tatabánya (Hungary)	28–25	(Germany) TSV Hannover-Burgdorf	Audi Aréna, Győr; Attendance: 2,500; Referees: Doychinov, Goretsov (BUL)
24 February 2019; 13:00	Vujović 7	(16–16)	three players 5	Audi Aréna, Győr; Attendance: 2,500; Referees: Doychinov, Goretsov (BUL)
24 February 2019; 13:00	1× (yellow card) 3× (suspension)	Report	4× (yellow card) 5× (suspension)	Audi Aréna, Győr; Attendance: 2,500; Referees: Doychinov, Goretsov (BUL)

3 March 2019; 13:00	TSV Hannover-Burgdorf (Germany)	27–27	(Hungary) Tatabánya	Swiss Life Hall, Hanover; Attendance: 3,521; Referees: Ershov, Pavliukov (RUS)
3 March 2019; 13:00	four players 5	(14–14)	Vujović 8	Swiss Life Hall, Hanover; Attendance: 3,521; Referees: Ershov, Pavliukov (RUS)
3 March 2019; 13:00	3× (yellow card) 2× (suspension)	Report	3× (yellow card) 5× (suspension)	Swiss Life Hall, Hanover; Attendance: 3,521; Referees: Ershov, Pavliukov (RUS)

3 March 2019; 19:00	Eurofarm Rabotnik (North Macedonia)	29–28	(Croatia) Nexe	Sports Hall Mladost, Bitola; Attendance: 2,100; Referees: Harabagiu, Stănescu (ROU)
3 March 2019; 19:00	Stjepanović 7	(14–12)	Gadža 9	Sports Hall Mladost, Bitola; Attendance: 2,100; Referees: Harabagiu, Stănescu (ROU)
3 March 2019; 19:00	3× (yellow card) 4× (suspension)	Report	1× (yellow card) 3× (suspension)	Sports Hall Mladost, Bitola; Attendance: 2,100; Referees: Harabagiu, Stănescu (ROU)

23 March 2019; 19:30	Nexe (Croatia)	26–29	(Hungary) Tatabánya	Sportska dvorana kralja Tomislava, Našice; Attendance: 2,000; Referees: Nabokau, Kulik (BLR)
23 March 2019; 19:30	Buvinić 5	(9–14)	Vujović 7	Sportska dvorana kralja Tomislava, Našice; Attendance: 2,000; Referees: Nabokau, Kulik (BLR)
23 March 2019; 19:30	2× (yellow card) 3× (suspension)	Report	2× (yellow card) 2× (suspension) 1× (red card)	Sportska dvorana kralja Tomislava, Našice; Attendance: 2,000; Referees: Nabokau, Kulik (BLR)

24 March 2019; 19:00	Eurofarm Rabotnik (North Macedonia)	17–29	(Germany) TSV Hannover-Burgdorf	Sports Hall Mladost, Bitola; Referees: Cabrejas, Sánchez (ESP)
24 March 2019; 19:00	Kuzmanovski 7	(8–15)	Ugalde 9	Sports Hall Mladost, Bitola; Referees: Cabrejas, Sánchez (ESP)
24 March 2019; 19:00	1× (yellow card) 2× (suspension)	Report	3× (yellow card) 3× (suspension)	Sports Hall Mladost, Bitola; Referees: Cabrejas, Sánchez (ESP)

27 March 2019; 20:30	TSV Hannover-Burgdorf (Germany)	32–22	(Croatia) Nexe	Swiss Life Hall, Hanover; Attendance: 3,614; Referees: Covalciuc, Covalciuc (MDA)
27 March 2019; 20:30	Kastening 10	(14–9)	Barišić-Jaman 4	Swiss Life Hall, Hanover; Attendance: 3,614; Referees: Covalciuc, Covalciuc (MDA)
27 March 2019; 20:30	2× (yellow card) 4× (suspension)	Report	3× (yellow card) 3× (suspension)	Swiss Life Hall, Hanover; Attendance: 3,614; Referees: Covalciuc, Covalciuc (MDA)

31 March 2019; 15:00	Tatabánya (Hungary)	30–27	(North Macedonia) Eurofarm Rabotnik	Audi Aréna, Győr; Attendance: 2,500; Referees: Panayides, Andreou (CYP)
31 March 2019; 15:00	Grigoraș 5	(12–13)	Ostroushko 9	Audi Aréna, Győr; Attendance: 2,500; Referees: Panayides, Andreou (CYP)
31 March 2019; 15:00	2× (yellow card) 1× (suspension)	Report	4× (yellow card) 2× (suspension)	Audi Aréna, Győr; Attendance: 2,500; Referees: Panayides, Andreou (CYP)

=== Group C ===
Pos	Team	Pld	W	D	L	GF	GA	GD	Pts	Qualification
1	(Portugal) FC Porto	6	6	0	0	196	168	+28	12	Knockout stage
2	(Denmark) TTH Holstebro	6	3	0	3	175	160	+15	6	Ranking of the second-placed teams
3	(Romania) Dobrogea Sud Constanța	6	2	0	4	165	174	−9	4	
4	(Spain) Liberbank Cuenca	6	1	0	5	152	186	−34	2	

Source: EHF

9 February 2019; 15:00	TTH Holstebro (Denmark)	29–25	(Romania) Dobrogea Sud Constanța	Gråkjær Arena, Holstebro; Attendance: 1,815; Referees: Buache, Meyer (SUI)
9 February 2019; 15:00	Bramming 8	(14–12)	three players 4	Gråkjær Arena, Holstebro; Attendance: 1,815; Referees: Buache, Meyer (SUI)
9 February 2019; 15:00	3× (yellow card) 5× (suspension)	Report	4× (yellow card) 5× (suspension)	Gråkjær Arena, Holstebro; Attendance: 1,815; Referees: Buache, Meyer (SUI)

9 February 2019; 19:00	FC Porto (Portugal)	37–26	(Spain) Liberbank Cuenca	Dragão Caixa, Porto; Attendance: 1,408; Referees: Herczeg, Südi (HUN)
9 February 2019; 19:00	Magalhães 7	(20–12)	Dutra 8	Dragão Caixa, Porto; Attendance: 1,408; Referees: Herczeg, Südi (HUN)
9 February 2019; 19:00	1× (yellow card) 7× (suspension)	Report	1× (yellow card) 2× (suspension)	Dragão Caixa, Porto; Attendance: 1,408; Referees: Herczeg, Südi (HUN)

16 February 2019; 13:45	Dobrogea Sud Constanța (Romania)	19–35	(Portugal) FC Porto	City Hall Constanta, Constanța; Attendance: 1,400; Referees: Bolic, Hurich (AUT)
16 February 2019; 13:45	Crnoglavac 6	(13–18)	Martins 8	City Hall Constanta, Constanța; Attendance: 1,400; Referees: Bolic, Hurich (AUT)
16 February 2019; 13:45	2× (yellow card) 2× (suspension)	Report	1× (yellow card) 6× (suspension)	City Hall Constanta, Constanța; Attendance: 1,400; Referees: Bolic, Hurich (AUT)

17 February 2019; 12:00	Liberbank Cuenca (Spain)	26–24	(Denmark) TTH Holstebro	Pabellón Municipal El Sargal, Cuenca; Attendance: 1,107; Referees: Bounouara, Sami (FRA)
17 February 2019; 12:00	Dutra 5	(12–12)	Bramming 12	Pabellón Municipal El Sargal, Cuenca; Attendance: 1,107; Referees: Bounouara, Sami (FRA)
17 February 2019; 12:00	2× (yellow card) 6× (suspension)	Report	1× (yellow card) 5× (suspension)	Pabellón Municipal El Sargal, Cuenca; Attendance: 1,107; Referees: Bounouara, Sami (FRA)

23 February 2019; 18:45	TTH Holstebro (Denmark)	31–33	(Portugal) FC Porto	Gråkjær Arena, Holstebro; Attendance: 1,487; Referees: Jović, Arnautović (BIH)
23 February 2019; 18:45	Bramming 14	(15–17)	Areia, Martins 6	Gråkjær Arena, Holstebro; Attendance: 1,487; Referees: Jović, Arnautović (BIH)
23 February 2019; 18:45	4× (yellow card) 3× (suspension)	Report	2× (yellow card) 3× (suspension)	Gråkjær Arena, Holstebro; Attendance: 1,487; Referees: Jović, Arnautović (BIH)

25 February 2019; 18:00	Dobrogea Sud Constanța (Romania)	34–26	(Spain) Liberbank Cuenca	City Hall Constanta, Constanța; Attendance: 1,250; Referees: Chaskis, Tsakonas (GRE)
25 February 2019; 18:00	Kević 10	(16–10)	Dutra 8	City Hall Constanta, Constanța; Attendance: 1,250; Referees: Chaskis, Tsakonas (GRE)
25 February 2019; 18:00	3× (yellow card) 3× (suspension)	Report	3× (yellow card) 3× (suspension)	City Hall Constanta, Constanța; Attendance: 1,250; Referees: Chaskis, Tsakonas (GRE)

2 March 2019; 16:00	FC Porto (Portugal)	32–29	(Denmark) TTH Holstebro	Dragão Caixa, Porto; Attendance: 1,524; Referees: Leandersson, Lindroos (FIN)
2 March 2019; 16:00	four players 4	(13–12)	Bramming 11	Dragão Caixa, Porto; Attendance: 1,524; Referees: Leandersson, Lindroos (FIN)
2 March 2019; 16:00	2× (yellow card) 2× (suspension)	Report	2× (yellow card) 3× (suspension)	Dragão Caixa, Porto; Attendance: 1,524; Referees: Leandersson, Lindroos (FIN)

3 March 2019; 12:00	Liberbank Cuenca (Spain)	26–28	(Romania) Dobrogea Sud Constanța	Pabellón Municipal El Sargal, Cuenca; Attendance: 1,700; Referees: Baumgart, Wild (GER)
3 March 2019; 12:00	Dutra, Oscar 4	(13–14)	Crnoglavac, Vujović 5	Pabellón Municipal El Sargal, Cuenca; Attendance: 1,700; Referees: Baumgart, Wild (GER)
3 March 2019; 12:00	2× (yellow card) 3× (suspension)	Report	2× (yellow card) 4× (suspension)	Pabellón Municipal El Sargal, Cuenca; Attendance: 1,700; Referees: Baumgart, Wild (GER)

23 March 2019; 17:00	Dobrogea Sud Constanța (Romania)	22–28	(Denmark) TTH Holstebro	City Hall Constanta, Constanța; Attendance: 1,400; Referees: Jaškins, Žabko (LAT)
23 March 2019; 17:00	Kević 6	(8–16)	Bramming 6	City Hall Constanta, Constanța; Attendance: 1,400; Referees: Jaškins, Žabko (LAT)
23 March 2019; 17:00	2× (yellow card) 1× (suspension)	Report	2× (yellow card) 5× (suspension)	City Hall Constanta, Constanța; Attendance: 1,400; Referees: Jaškins, Žabko (LAT)

24 March 2019; 12:00	Liberbank Cuenca (Spain)	26–29	(Portugal) FC Porto	Pabellón Municipal El Sargal, Cuenca; Attendance: 1,200; Referees: Doychinov, Goretsov (BUL)
24 March 2019; 12:00	Alves 6	(10–16)	Balázquez 6	Pabellón Municipal El Sargal, Cuenca; Attendance: 1,200; Referees: Doychinov, Goretsov (BUL)
24 March 2019; 12:00	2× (yellow card) 1× (suspension)	Report	2× (yellow card) 3× (suspension)	Pabellón Municipal El Sargal, Cuenca; Attendance: 1,200; Referees: Doychinov, Goretsov (BUL)

30 March 2019; 13:00	TTH Holstebro (Denmark)	34–22	(Spain) Liberbank Cuenca	Gråkjær Arena, Holstebro; Attendance: 1,113; Referees: Barysas, Petrušis (LTU)
30 March 2019; 13:00	Bramming 15	(19–12)	Diaz 7	Gråkjær Arena, Holstebro; Attendance: 1,113; Referees: Barysas, Petrušis (LTU)
30 March 2019; 13:00	2× (yellow card) 4× (suspension) 1× (red card)	Report	3× (yellow card) 3× (suspension)	Gråkjær Arena, Holstebro; Attendance: 1,113; Referees: Barysas, Petrušis (LTU)

30 March 2019; 19:00	FC Porto (Portugal)	30–27	(Romania) Dobrogea Sud Constanța	Dragão Caixa, Porto; Attendance: 825; Referees: Smailagic, Smailagic (SWE)
30 March 2019; 19:00	Balázquez 6	(16–13)	Chikovani, Crnoglavac 6	Dragão Caixa, Porto; Attendance: 825; Referees: Smailagic, Smailagic (SWE)
30 March 2019; 19:00	2× (yellow card) 4× (suspension)	Report	3× (yellow card) 1× (suspension)	Dragão Caixa, Porto; Attendance: 825; Referees: Smailagic, Smailagic (SWE)

=== Group D ===
Pos	Team	Pld	W	D	L	GF	GA	GD	Pts	Qualification
1	(Germany) THW Kiel	6	6	0	0	191	144	+47	12	Knockout stage
2	(Denmark) GOG Håndbold	6	3	0	3	182	180	+2	6	Ranking of the second-placed teams
3	(Spain) Fraikin Granollers	6	2	1	3	174	195	−21	5	
4	(Poland) Azoty-Puławy	6	0	1	5	169	197	−28	1	

Source: EHF

9 February 2019; 17:00	Azoty-Puławy (Poland)	28–31	(Denmark) GOG Håndbold	Globus Hall, Lublin; Attendance: 2,900; Referees: Nabokau, Kulik (BLR)
9 February 2019; 17:00	Jarosiewicz, Podsiadło 6	(12–13)	Jakobsen 9	Globus Hall, Lublin; Attendance: 2,900; Referees: Nabokau, Kulik (BLR)
9 February 2019; 17:00	2× (yellow card) 4× (suspension)	Report	3× (yellow card) 4× (suspension)	Globus Hall, Lublin; Attendance: 2,900; Referees: Nabokau, Kulik (BLR)

10 February 2019; 19:30	Fraikin Granollers (Spain)	22–33	(Germany) THW Kiel	Palau d'Esports de Granollers, Granollers; Attendance: 3,225; Referees: Andorka, Hucker (HUN)
10 February 2019; 19:30	Figueras 7	(11–18)	three players 5	Palau d'Esports de Granollers, Granollers; Attendance: 3,225; Referees: Andorka, Hucker (HUN)
10 February 2019; 19:30	1× (yellow card) 2× (suspension)	Report	1× (yellow card) 4× (suspension) 1× (red card)	Palau d'Esports de Granollers, Granollers; Attendance: 3,225; Referees: Andorka, Hucker (HUN)

13 February 2019; 19:45	THW Kiel (Germany)	26–23	(Poland) Azoty-Puławy	Sparkassen-Arena, Kiel; Attendance: 7,607; Referees: Boričič, Marković (SRB)
13 February 2019; 19:45	Duvnjak, M. Landin 6	(11–11)	Podsiadło 5	Sparkassen-Arena, Kiel; Attendance: 7,607; Referees: Boričič, Marković (SRB)
13 February 2019; 19:45	2× (yellow card) 2× (suspension)	Report	3× (yellow card) 4× (suspension)	Sparkassen-Arena, Kiel; Attendance: 7,607; Referees: Boričič, Marković (SRB)

17 February 2019; 15:00	GOG Håndbold (Denmark)	34–26	(Spain) Fraikin Granollers	SU'VI:T Arena, Gudme; Attendance: 1,458; Referees: Manea, Iliescu (ROU)
17 February 2019; 15:00	Lindenchrone 8	(17–13)	Figueras, Valera 5	SU'VI:T Arena, Gudme; Attendance: 1,458; Referees: Manea, Iliescu (ROU)
17 February 2019; 15:00	2× (yellow card) 3× (suspension)	Report	3× (yellow card) 6× (suspension)	SU'VI:T Arena, Gudme; Attendance: 1,458; Referees: Manea, Iliescu (ROU)

23 February 2019; 15:00	Azoty-Puławy (Poland)	34–34	(Spain) Fraikin Granollers	Globus Hall, Lublin; Attendance: 1,750; Referees: Cindrić, Gonzurek (CRO)
23 February 2019; 15:00	Podsiadło 12	(16–15)	Figueras 10	Globus Hall, Lublin; Attendance: 1,750; Referees: Cindrić, Gonzurek (CRO)
23 February 2019; 15:00	3× (yellow card)	Report	1× (yellow card) 5× (suspension) 1× (red card)	Globus Hall, Lublin; Attendance: 1,750; Referees: Cindrić, Gonzurek (CRO)

24 February 2019; 15:00	THW Kiel (Germany)	37–23	(Denmark) GOG Håndbold	Sparkassen-Arena, Kiel; Attendance: 8,618; Referees: Gasmi, Gasmi (FRA)
24 February 2019; 15:00	Ekberg 10	(19–10)	Ríkharðsson 6	Sparkassen-Arena, Kiel; Attendance: 8,618; Referees: Gasmi, Gasmi (FRA)
24 February 2019; 15:00	2× (yellow card) 2× (suspension)	Report	1× (yellow card) 5× (suspension)	Sparkassen-Arena, Kiel; Attendance: 8,618; Referees: Gasmi, Gasmi (FRA)

3 March 2019; 15:00	GOG Håndbold (Denmark)	22–26	(Germany) THW Kiel	SU'VI:T Arena, Gudme; Attendance: 4,000; Referees: Backović, Palačković (SVN)
3 March 2019; 15:00	Ríkharðsson 6	(10–11)	Ekberg 7	SU'VI:T Arena, Gudme; Attendance: 4,000; Referees: Backović, Palačković (SVN)
3 March 2019; 15:00	4× (yellow card) 7× (suspension)	Report	2× (yellow card) 4× (suspension)	SU'VI:T Arena, Gudme; Attendance: 4,000; Referees: Backović, Palačković (SVN)

3 March 2019; 19:30	Fraikin Granollers (Spain)	30–29	(Poland) Azoty-Puławy	Palau d'Esports de Granollers, Granollers; Attendance: 1,000; Referees: Opava, Válek (CZE)
3 March 2019; 19:30	Figueras 8	(15–12)	Podsiadło 8	Palau d'Esports de Granollers, Granollers; Attendance: 1,000; Referees: Opava, Válek (CZE)
3 March 2019; 19:30	1× (yellow card) 3× (suspension)	Report	3× (yellow card) 6× (suspension)	Palau d'Esports de Granollers, Granollers; Attendance: 1,000; Referees: Opava, Válek (CZE)

23 March 2019; 18:00	THW Kiel (Germany)	34–28	(Spain) Fraikin Granollers	Sparkassen-Arena, Kiel; Attendance: 9,006; Referees: Freitas, Carvalho (POR)
23 March 2019; 18:00	Ekberg 5	(20–13)	Figueras 9	Sparkassen-Arena, Kiel; Attendance: 9,006; Referees: Freitas, Carvalho (POR)
23 March 2019; 18:00	3× (yellow card) 3× (suspension)	Report	1× (yellow card) 1× (suspension)	Sparkassen-Arena, Kiel; Attendance: 9,006; Referees: Freitas, Carvalho (POR)

23 March 2019; 18:30	GOG Håndbold (Denmark)	41–29	(Poland) Azoty-Puławy	SU'VI:T Arena, Gudme; Attendance: 1,311; Referees: Metalari, Nikolovski (MKD)
23 March 2019; 18:30	Lærke 6	(21–19)	Podsiadło 6	SU'VI:T Arena, Gudme; Attendance: 1,311; Referees: Metalari, Nikolovski (MKD)
23 March 2019; 18:30	1× (yellow card) 3× (suspension)	Report	1× (yellow card) 3× (suspension)	SU'VI:T Arena, Gudme; Attendance: 1,311; Referees: Metalari, Nikolovski (MKD)

30 March 2019; 15:00	Azoty-Puławy (Poland)	26–35	(Germany) THW Kiel	Globus Hall, Lublin; Attendance: 2,500; Referees: Manea, Iliescu (ROU)
30 March 2019; 15:00	Rogulski 7	(14–15)	Pekeler 7	Globus Hall, Lublin; Attendance: 2,500; Referees: Manea, Iliescu (ROU)
30 March 2019; 15:00	2× (yellow card) 2× (suspension)	Report	1× (yellow card) 1× (suspension)	Globus Hall, Lublin; Attendance: 2,500; Referees: Manea, Iliescu (ROU)

31 March 2019; 19:30	Fraikin Granollers (Spain)	34–31	(Denmark) GOG Håndbold	Palau d'Esports de Granollers, Granollers; Attendance: 1,425; Referees: Buache, Meyer (SUI)
31 March 2019; 19:30	three players 6	(19–15)	Møller 9	Palau d'Esports de Granollers, Granollers; Attendance: 1,425; Referees: Buache, Meyer (SUI)
31 March 2019; 19:30	4× (yellow card) 8× (suspension) 1× (red card)	Report	4× (yellow card) 4× (suspension) 1× (red card)	Palau d'Esports de Granollers, Granollers; Attendance: 1,425; Referees: Buache, Meyer (SUI)
