= 2018–19 EHF Cup =

European handball tournament

EHF Cup
- 2018–19

Tournament information
- Sport: Handball
- Dates: 1 September 2018–18 May 2019
- Host(s): THW Kiel (final four)
- Venue(s): Sparkassen-Arena (final four)
- Teams: 59 (qualification stage); 16 (group stage)
- Website: eurohandball.com

Final positions
- Champions: (Germany) THW Kiel
- Runner-up: (Germany) Füchse Berlin

Tournament statistics
- MVP: (Sweden) Niclas Ekberg
- Top scorer(s): (Denmark) Magnus Bramming (100 goals)

The 2018–19 EHF Cup was the 38th edition of the EHF Cup, the second most important European handball club competition organised by the European Handball Federation (EHF), and the sixth edition since the merger with the EHF Cup Winners' Cup.

== Team allocation ==
=== Teams ===
Third qualifying round
(Croatia) RK Nexe	(Denmark) TTH Holstebro	(Denmark) GOG Håndbold	(Spain) BM Logroño La Rioja
(Spain) Fraikin Granollers	(Spain) Liberbank Cuenca	(France) Saint-Raphaël Var Handball	(Germany) THW Kiel
(Germany) TSV Hannover-Burgdorf	(Germany) Füchse Berlin	(Germany) SC Magdeburg	(Hungary) Grundfos Tatabánya KC
(Hungary) Balatonfüredi KSE	(North Macedonia) HC Eurofarm Rabotnik	(Poland) KS Azoty-Puławy	(Sweden) HK Malmö
Second qualifying round
(Austria) Alpla HC Hard	(Belgium) Achilles Bocholt	(Belarus) SKA Minsk	(Czech Republic) HCB Karviná
(Denmark) Aalborg Håndbold	(Norway) Drammen HK	(France) Pays d'Aix Université Club	(Greece) Olympiacos
(Hungary) Sport36-Komló	(Iceland) IBV Vestmannaeyjar	(Israel) Maccabi Srugo Rishon LeZion	(North Macedonia) HC Prolet 62
(Netherlands) HV Aalsmeer	(Poland) Gwardia Opole	(Portugal) SL Benfica	
(Russia) HC Spartak Moscow	(Romania) HC Dobrogea Sud Constanța	(Serbia) Vojvodina	
(Switzerland) Pfadi Winterthur	(Slovenia) RD Ribnica	(Ukraine) ZTR Zaporizhia	
First qualifying round
(Austria) SG Handball West Wien	(Croatia) GRK Varaždin	(Croatia) RK Dubrava	(Czech Republic) Talent Robstav M.A.T. Plzeň
(Estonia) Põlva Serviti	(United Kingdom) Glasgow HC	(Georgia (country)) B.S.B. Batumi	(Iceland) FH Hafnarfjordur
(Iceland) Selfoss	(Kosovo) KH BESA Famgas	(Lithuania) Klaipėda Dragūnas	(Luxembourg) Handball Käerjeng
(Netherlands) OCI-Lions	(Portugal) FC Porto	(Romania) AHC Potaissa Turda	(Romania) Steaua București
(Slovenia) RD Koper 2013	(Slovenia) RK Gorenje Velenje	(Serbia) RK Železničar 1949	
(Switzerland) BSV Bern	(Switzerland) Kadetten Schaffhausen	(Sweden) Alingsås HK	

== Round and draw dates ==
The schedule of the competition was as follows (all draws were held at the EHF headquarters in Vienna, Austria).

Phase	Round	Draw date	First leg	Second leg
Qualification	First qualifying round	17 July 2018	1-2 September 2018	8-9 September 2018
Qualification	Second qualifying round	17 July 2018	6–7 October 2018	13–14 October 2018
Qualification	Third qualifying round	16 October 2018	17–18 November 2018	24–25 November 2018
Group stage	Matchday 1	29 November 2018	9–10 February 2019	
Group stage	Matchday 2	29 November 2018	16–17 February 2019	
Group stage	Matchday 3	29 November 2018	23–24 February 2019	
Group stage	Matchday 4	29 November 2018	2–3 March 2019	
Group stage	Matchday 5	29 November 2018	23–24 March 2019	
Group stage	Matchday 6	29 November 2018	30–31 March 2019	
Knockout phase	Quarter-finals	2 April 2019	20–21 April 2019	27–28 April 2019
Knockout phase	Final four	30 April 2019	17–18 May 2019	

== Qualification stage ==
The qualification stage consists of three rounds, which are played as two-legged ties using a home-and-away system. In the draws for each round, teams are allocated into two pots, with teams from Pot 1 facing teams from Pot 2. The winners of each pairing (highlighted in bold) qualified for the following round.

For each round, teams listed first will play the first leg at home. In some cases, teams agree to play both matches at the same venue.

=== Round 1 ===
A total of 22 teams entered the draw for the first qualification round, which was held on Tuesday, 17 July 2018. The draw seeding pots were composed as follows:

Pot 1	Pot 2
(Croatia) RK Dubrava; (Czech Republic) Talent Robstav M.A.T. Plzeň; (Estonia) Põlva Serviti; (Iceland) Selfoss; (Kosovo) KH BESA Famgas; (Netherlands) OCI-Lions; (Portugal) FC Porto; (Romania) Steaua București; (Slovenia) RK Gorenje Velenje; (Serbia) RK Železničar 1949; (Switzerland) Kadetten Schaffhausen	(Austria) SG Handball West Wien; (Croatia) GRK Varaždin; (United Kingdom) Glasgow HC; (Georgia (country)) B.S.B. Batumi; (Iceland) FH Hafnarfjordur; (Lithuania) Klaipėda Dragūnas; (Luxembourg) Handball Käerjeng; (Romania) AHC Potaissa Turda; (Slovenia) RD Koper 2013; (Switzerland) BSV Bern; (Sweden) Alingsås HK

The first legs were played on 1–2 and the second legs were played on 8–9 September 2018.

Team 1	Agg.	Team 2	1st leg	2nd leg
SG Handball West Wien (Austria)	54–55	(Netherlands) **OCI-Lions**	26–25	28–30
B.S.B. Batumi (Georgia (country))	42–67 ^{1}	(Kosovo) **KH BESA Famgas**	20–30	22–37
Põlva Serviti (Estonia)	51–53	(Switzerland) **BSV Bern**	26–26	25–27
**Talent Robstav M.A.T. Plzeň** (Czech Republic)	69–24 ^{2}	(United Kingdom) Glasgow HC	39–12	30–12
**FC Porto** (Portugal)	68–45	(Romania) AHC Potaissa Turda	41–21	27–24
RK Železničar 1949 (Serbia)	56–59	(Luxembourg) **Handball Käerjeng**	30–27	26–32
RD Koper 2013 (Slovenia)	49–56	(Switzerland) **Kadetten Schaffhausen**	25–25	24–31
**Selfoss** (Iceland)	60–55	(Lithuania) Klaipėda Dragūnas	34–28	26–27
Alingsås HK (Sweden)	48–51	(Slovenia) **RK Gorenje Velenje**	26–23	22–28
GRK Varaždin (Croatia)	50–55	(Romania) **Steaua București**	25–26	25–29
RK Dubrava (Croatia)	61–63	(Iceland) **FH Hafnarfjordur**	29–33	32–30

Notes

^{1} Both legs were hosted by B.S.B. Batumi.
^{2} Both legs were hosted by Talent Robstav M.A.T. Plzeň.

=== Round 2 ===
The first legs were played on 6–7 October and the second legs were played on 13–14 October 2018. Some teams agreed to play both matches in the same venue.

Team 1	Agg.	Team 2	1st leg	2nd leg
**Vojvodina** (Serbia)	55–44	(Netherlands) HV Aalsmeer	29–21	26–23
RD Ribnica (Slovenia)	56–59	(Iceland) **Selfoss**	30–27	26–32
Handball Käerjeng (Luxembourg)	64–74	(Belgium) **Achilles Bocholt**	29–33	35–41
**HC Baník Karviná** (Czech Republic)	58–47 ^{1}	(North Macedonia) HC Prolet 62	26–22	32–25
Sport36-Komló (Hungary)	56–56 (a)	(Greece) **Olympiacos**	34–29	22–27
**RK Gorenje Velenje** (Slovenia)	47–45	(Poland) Gwardia Opole	26–22	21–23
**Aalborg Håndbold** (Denmark)	60–53	(Switzerland) Pfadi Winterthur	31–29	29–24
**HC Dobrogea Sud Constanța** (Romania)	57–44 ^{2}	(Czech Republic) Talent Robstav M.A.T. Plzeň	28–21	29–23
**Drammen HK** (Norway)	57–53	(Kosovo) KH BESA Famgas	37–26	20–27
**OCI-Lions** (Netherlands)	52–52 (a)	(Austria) Alpla HC Hard	23–23	29–29
Steaua București (Romania)	48–50	(Israel) **Maccabi Srugo Rishon LeZion**	25–23	23–27
HC Spartak Moscow (Russia)	46–47	(Switzerland) **BSV Bern**	28–23	18–24
**SL Benfica** (Portugal)	71–63 ^{3}	(Iceland) FH Hafnarfjordur	37–32	34–31
**FC Porto** (Portugal)	58–54	(Belarus) SKA Minsk	34–29	24–25
ZTR Zaporizhia (Ukraine)	60–68	(Switzerland) **Kadetten Schaffhausen**	27–30	33–38
IBV Vestmannaeyjar (Iceland)	49–59	(France) **Pays d'Aix Université Club**	24–23	25–36

Notes

^{1} Both legs were hosted by Karviná.
^{2} Both legs were hosted by HC Dobrogea Sud Constanța.
^{3} Both legs were hosted by SL Benfica.

=== Round 3 ===
A total of 32 teams entered the draw for the third qualification round, which was held on Tuesday, 16 October 2018. The draw seeding pots were composed as follows:

Pot 1	Pot 2
(Croatia) RK Nexe; (Denmark) GOG Håndbold; (Denmark) TTH Holstebro; (Spain) BM Logroño La Rioja; (Spain) Fraikin Granollers; (Spain) Liberbank Cuenca; (France) Saint-Raphaël Var Handball; (Germany) Füchse Berlin; (Germany) SC Magdeburg; (Germany) THW Kiel; (Germany) TSV Hannover-Burgdorf; (Hungary) Balatonfüredi KSE; (Hungary) Grundfos Tatabánya KC; (North Macedonia) HC Eurofarm Rabotnik; (Poland) KS Azoty-Puławy; (Sweden) HK Malmö	(Belgium) Achilles Bocholt; (Czech Republic) HC Baník Karviná; (Denmark) Aalborg Håndbold; (France) Pays d'Aix Université Club; (Greece) Olympiacos; (Iceland) Selfoss; (Israel) Maccabi Srugo Rishon LeZion; (Netherlands) OCI-Lions; (Norway) Drammen HK; (Portugal) FC Porto; (Portugal) SL Benfica; (Romania) HC Dobrogea Sud Constanța; (Slovenia) RK Gorenje Velenje; (Serbia) Vojvodina; (Switzerland) BSV Bern; (Switzerland) Kadetten Schaffhausen

The first legs were played on 17–18 November and the second legs were played on 24–25 November 2018.

Team 1	Agg.	Team 2	1st leg	2nd leg
HK Malmö (Sweden)	50–57	(Romania) **HC Dobrogea Sud Constanța**	22–23	28–34
SC Magdeburg (Germany)	53–57	(Portugal) **FC Porto**	26–23	27–34
**Fraikin Granollers** (Spain)	57–49	(Slovenia) RK Gorenje Velenje	24–25	33–24
**BM Logroño La Rioja** (Spain)	50–50 (a)	(Switzerland) Kadetten Schaffhausen	26–22	24–28
**KS Azoty-Puławy** (Poland)	60–54	(Iceland) Selfoss	33–26	27–28
**THW Kiel** (Germany)	70–41	(Norway) Drammen HK	34–23	36–18
Aalborg Håndbold (Denmark)	54–57	(Germany) **Füchse Berlin**	31–29	23–28
Olympiacos (Greece)	47–55	(Croatia) **RK Nexe**	22–25	25–30
**HC Eurofarm Rabotnik** (North Macedonia)	59–47	(Switzerland) BSV Bern	29–19	30–28
**TSV Hannover-Burgdorf** (Germany)	74–69	(Portugal) SL Benfica	41–36	33–33
Achilles Bocholt (Belgium)	54–71	(Spain) **Liberbank Cuenca**	29–34	25–37
**Grundfos Tatabánya KC** (Hungary)	58–45	(Netherlands) OCI-Lions	31–18	27–27
HC Baník Karviná (Czech Republic)	62–66	(Hungary) **Balatonfüredi KSE**	33–34	29–32
Vojvodina (Serbia)	52–70	(Denmark) **GOG Håndbold**	27–32	25–38
Pays d'Aix Université Club (France)	50–53	(Denmark) **TTH Holstebro**	25–25	25–28
Maccabi Srugo Rishon LeZion (Israel)	59–63	(France) **Saint-Raphaël Var Handball**	29–36	30–27

== Group stage ==
Location of teams of the 2018–19 EHF Cup group stage.
Red: Group A; Blue: Group B; Green: Group C; Yellow: Group D.

The draw of the EHF Cup group stage took place on Thursday, 29 November 2018. The 16 teams allocated into four pots were drawn into four groups of four teams.

In each group, teams play against each other home-and-away in a round-robin format. The matchdays are 9–10 February, 16–17 February, 23–24 February, 2–3 March, 23–24 March and 30–31 March 2019.

In the group stage, teams are ranked according to points (2 points for a win, 1 point for a draw, 0 points for a loss). After completion of the group stage, if two or more teams have scored the same number of points, the ranking will be determined as follows:

1. Highest number of points in matches between the teams directly involved;
2. Superior goal difference in matches between the teams directly involved;
3. Highest number of goals scored in matches between the teams directly involved (or in the away match in case of a two-team tie);
4. Superior goal difference in all matches of the group;
5. Highest number of plus goals in all matches of the group;

If the ranking of one of these teams is determined, the above criteria are consecutively followed until the ranking of all teams is determined. If no ranking can be determined, a decision shall be obtained by EHF through drawing of lots.

During the group stage, only criteria 4–5 apply to determine the provisional ranking of teams.

=== Group A ===
Pos	Team	Pld	W	D	L	GF	GA	GD	Pts	Qualification	FÜC	SRH	LOG	BAL
1	(Germany) Füchse Berlin	6	5	0	1	192	166	+26	10	Knockout stage	—	33–29	29–27	36–23
2	(France) Saint-Raphaël Var Handball	6	4	0	2	180	169	+11	8	Ranking of the second-placed teams	34–31	—	30–26	27–23
3	(Spain) Logroño La Rioja	6	2	0	4	174	180	−6	4		29–34	29–28	—	29–24
4	(Hungary) Balatonfüredi	6	1	0	5	156	187	−31	2		24–29	27–32	35–34	—

Source: EHF

=== Group B ===
Pos	Team	Pld	W	D	L	GF	GA	GD	Pts	Qualification	TAT	HAN	NEX	RAB
1	(Hungary) Tatabánya	6	4	1	1	172	154	+18	9	Knockout stage	—	28–25	27–28	30–27
2	(Germany) TSV Hannover-Burgdorf	6	3	1	2	162	144	+18	7	Ranking of the second-placed teams	27–27	—	32–22	24–21
3	(Croatia) Nexe	6	3	0	3	156	160	−4	6		26–29	29–25	—	23–18
4	(North Macedonia) Eurofarm Rabotnik	6	1	0	5	133	165	−32	2		21–31	17–29	29–28	—

Source: EHF

=== Group C ===
Pos	Team	Pld	W	D	L	GF	GA	GD	Pts	Qualification	POR	HOL	DOB	LIB
1	(Portugal) FC Porto	6	6	0	0	196	168	+28	12	Knockout stage	—	32–29	30–27	37–26
2	(Denmark) TTH Holstebro	6	3	0	3	175	160	+15	6	Ranking of the second-placed teams	31–33	—	29–25	34–22
3	(Romania) Dobrogea Sud Constanța	6	2	0	4	165	174	−9	4		29–35	22–28	—	34–26
4	(Spain) Liberbank Cuenca	6	1	0	5	152	186	−34	2		26–29	26–24	26–28	—

Source: EHF

=== Group D ===
Pos	Team	Pld	W	D	L	GF	GA	GD	Pts	Qualification	KIE	GOG	GRA	AZO
1	(Germany) THW Kiel	6	6	0	0	191	144	+47	12	Knockout stage	—	37–23	34–28	26–23
2	(Denmark) GOG Håndbold	6	3	0	3	182	180	+2	6	Ranking of the second-placed teams	22–26	—	34–26	41–29
3	(Spain) Fraikin Granollers	6	2	1	3	174	195	−21	5		22–33	34–31	—	30–29
4	(Poland) Azoty-Puławy	6	0	1	5	169	197	−28	1		26–35	28–31	34–34	—

Source: EHF

=== Ranking of the second-placed teams ===
The top three second-placed teams will qualify to the quarter-finals. The ranking of the second-placed teams will be determined on the basis of the team's results in the group stage.

Pos	Grp	Team	Pld	W	D	L	GF	GA	GD	Pts	Qualification
1	A	(France) Saint-Raphaël Var Handball	6	4	0	2	180	169	+11	8	Knockout stage
2	B	(Germany) TSV Hannover-Burgdorf	6	3	1	2	162	144	+18	7	Knockout stage
3	C	(Denmark) TTH Holstebro	6	3	0	3	175	160	+15	6	Knockout stage
4	D	(Denmark) GOG Håndbold	6	3	0	3	182	180	+2	6	

Source: EHF
Rules for classification: Tiebreakers

== Knockout stage ==
=== Quarter-finals ===
Since THW Kiel won their group, they qualified directly for the EHF Cup Finals and will not have to play the quarter-finals. In this case, the quarter-finals will consist of only three two-legged fixtures. The draw for the quarter-final pairings was held on Tuesday, 2 April, at 11:00 CET in the EHF headquarters in Vienna. The three group winners were placed in Pot 1, and the three best second-ranked teams were placed in Pot 2. The group winners started the quarter-finals with an away match on 20 and 21 April, and played the second leg at home on 27 and 28 April.

Pot 1 (Germany) Füchse Berlin (Hungary) Tatabánya (Portugal) FC Porto	Pot 2 (France) Saint-Raphaël Var Handball (Germany) TSV Hannover-Burgdorf (Denmark) TTH Holstebro

Team 1	Agg.	Team 2	1st leg	2nd leg
TSV Hannover-Burgdorf (Germany)	54–64	(Germany) Füchse Berlin	26–34	28–30
TTH Holstebro (Denmark)	52–50	(Hungary) Tatabánya	29–24	23–26
Saint-Raphaël Var Handball (France)	60–64	(Portugal) FC Porto	30–30	30–34

==== Matches ====
21 April 2019; 15:00	TSV Hannover-Burgdorf (Germany)	26–34	(Germany) Füchse Berlin	Swiss Life Hall, Hanover; Attendance: 3,937; Referees: Andorka, Hucker (HUN)
21 April 2019; 15:00	Olsen 11	(14–15)	Lindberg 6	Swiss Life Hall, Hanover; Attendance: 3,937; Referees: Andorka, Hucker (HUN)
21 April 2019; 15:00	4× (suspension)	Report	3× (yellow card) 6× (suspension)	Swiss Life Hall, Hanover; Attendance: 3,937; Referees: Andorka, Hucker (HUN)

28 April 2019; 15:00	Füchse Berlin (Germany)	30–28	(Germany) TSV Hannover-Burgdorf	Max-Schmeling-Halle, Berlin; Attendance: 7,165; Referees: Gasmi, Gasmi (FRA)
28 April 2019; 15:00	Lindberg 8	(18–11)	Kastening 9	Max-Schmeling-Halle, Berlin; Attendance: 7,165; Referees: Gasmi, Gasmi (FRA)
28 April 2019; 15:00	2× (yellow card) 8× (suspension)	Report	1× (yellow card) 3× (suspension)	Max-Schmeling-Halle, Berlin; Attendance: 7,165; Referees: Gasmi, Gasmi (FRA)

Füchse Berlin won 64–54 on aggregate.

20 April 2019; 17:45	TTH Holstebro (Denmark)	29–24	(Hungary) Tatabánya	Gråkjær Arena, Holstebro; Attendance: 2,021; Referees: Baumgart, Wild (GER)
20 April 2019; 17:45	Bramming 9	(12–9)	Vranković 6	Gråkjær Arena, Holstebro; Attendance: 2,021; Referees: Baumgart, Wild (GER)
20 April 2019; 17:45	2× (yellow card) 6× (suspension)	Report	3× (yellow card) 5× (suspension)	Gråkjær Arena, Holstebro; Attendance: 2,021; Referees: Baumgart, Wild (GER)

27 April 2019; 16:00	Tatabánya (Hungary)	26–23	(Denmark) TTH Holstebro	Audi Aréna, Győr; Attendance: 2,650; Referees: Brkić, Jusufhodžić (AUT)
27 April 2019; 16:00	Vujović 8	(14–12)	Bramming 5	Audi Aréna, Győr; Attendance: 2,650; Referees: Brkić, Jusufhodžić (AUT)
27 April 2019; 16:00	2× (yellow card) 5× (suspension) 1× (red card)	Report	1× (yellow card) 4× (suspension)	Audi Aréna, Győr; Attendance: 2,650; Referees: Brkić, Jusufhodžić (AUT)

TTH Holstebro won 52–50 on aggregate.

20 April 2019; 20:00	Saint-Raphaël Var Handball (France)	30–30	(Portugal) FC Porto	Palais des Sports JF Krakowski, Saint-Raphaël; Attendance: 2,000; Referees: Boričič, Marković (SRB)
20 April 2019; 20:00	Caucheteux 9	(17–17)	Areia, Branquinho 7	Palais des Sports JF Krakowski, Saint-Raphaël; Attendance: 2,000; Referees: Boričič, Marković (SRB)
20 April 2019; 20:00	2× (yellow card) 4× (suspension)	Report	1× (yellow card) 7× (suspension)	Palais des Sports JF Krakowski, Saint-Raphaël; Attendance: 2,000; Referees: Boričič, Marković (SRB)

27 April 2019; 18:00	FC Porto (Portugal)	34–30	(France) Saint-Raphaël Var Handball	Dragão Caixa, Porto; Attendance: 2,099; Referees: Buache, Meyer (SUI)
27 April 2019; 18:00	Areia 8	(17–15)	Caucheteux 10	Dragão Caixa, Porto; Attendance: 2,099; Referees: Buache, Meyer (SUI)
27 April 2019; 18:00	4× (yellow card) 4× (suspension) 1× (red card)	Report	3× (yellow card) 2× (suspension) 1× (red card)	Dragão Caixa, Porto; Attendance: 2,099; Referees: Buache, Meyer (SUI)

FC Porto won 64–60 on aggregate.

=== Final four ===
The seventh edition of the EHF Cup Finals in 2019 was hosted by THW Kiel after the EHF Executive Committee decided to award the hosting rights to the German club at its meeting on 6 December 2018. The tournament took place at Sparkassen-Arena in Kiel, on 17 and 18 May 2019. The draw was held on 30 April 2019.

As group winners, THW Kiel avoided playing the quarter-finals and qualified directly for the EHF Cup Finals.

==== Bracket ====
Semifinals
17 May
(Denmark) TTH Holstebro	26
(Germany) THW Kiel	32
17 May
(Germany) Füchse Berlin	24
(Portugal) FC Porto	20

Final
18 May
(Germany) THW Kiel	26
(Germany) Füchse Berlin	22
Third place
18 May
(Denmark) TTH Holstebro	26
(Portugal) FC Porto	28

==== Semifinals ====
17 May 2019; 18:00	TTH Holstebro (Denmark)	26–32	(Germany) THW Kiel	Sparkassen-Arena, Kiel; Attendance: 10,200; Referees: Bonaventura, Bonaventura (FRA)
17 May 2019; 18:00	Bramming 7	(14–16)	Ekberg 6	Sparkassen-Arena, Kiel; Attendance: 10,200; Referees: Bonaventura, Bonaventura (FRA)
17 May 2019; 18:00	2× (yellow card) 4× (suspension) 1× (red card)	Report	2× (yellow card) 1× (suspension)	Sparkassen-Arena, Kiel; Attendance: 10,200; Referees: Bonaventura, Bonaventura (FRA)

17 May 2019; 20:45	Füchse Berlin (Germany)	24–20	(Portugal) FC Porto	Sparkassen-Arena, Kiel; Attendance: 10,011; Referees: Jørum, Kleven (NOR)
17 May 2019; 20:45	Drux 6	(12–8)	Alves 6	Sparkassen-Arena, Kiel; Attendance: 10,011; Referees: Jørum, Kleven (NOR)
17 May 2019; 20:45	1× (yellow card) 2× (suspension)	Report	1× (yellow card) 4× (suspension)	Sparkassen-Arena, Kiel; Attendance: 10,011; Referees: Jørum, Kleven (NOR)

==== Third place game ====
18 May 2019; 18:00	TTH Holstebro (Denmark)	26–28	(Portugal) FC Porto	Sparkassen-Arena, Kiel; Attendance: 10,045; Referees: Brunner, Salah (SUI)
18 May 2019; 18:00	Smits 6	(16–14)	Branquinho 7	Sparkassen-Arena, Kiel; Attendance: 10,045; Referees: Brunner, Salah (SUI)
18 May 2019; 18:00	1× (yellow card) 3× (suspension)	Report	1× (yellow card) 3× (suspension)	Sparkassen-Arena, Kiel; Attendance: 10,045; Referees: Brunner, Salah (SUI)

==== Final ====
18 May 2019; 20:45	THW Kiel (Germany)	26–22	(Germany) Füchse Berlin	Sparkassen-Arena, Kiel; Attendance: 10,285; Referees: Jurinović, Mrvica (CRO)
18 May 2019; 20:45	Ekberg 7	(16–10)	Elísson 6	Sparkassen-Arena, Kiel; Attendance: 10,285; Referees: Jurinović, Mrvica (CRO)
18 May 2019; 20:45	3× (yellow card) 3× (suspension)	Report	3× (yellow card) 4× (suspension)	Sparkassen-Arena, Kiel; Attendance: 10,285; Referees: Jurinović, Mrvica (CRO)

== Top goalscorers ==
Rank	Player	Club	Goals
1	(Denmark) Magnus Bramming	(Denmark) TTH Holstebro	100
2	(Denmark) Hans Lindberg	(Germany) Füchse Berlin	79
3	(France) Raphaël Caucheteux	(France) Saint-Raphaël Var Handball	62

== See also ==
- 2018–19 EHF Champions League
- 2018–19 EHF Challenge Cup
- 2018–19 Women's EHF Cup
