= 2001–02 EHF Challenge Cup =

The 2001–02 EHF Challenge Cup season, was the 9th edition of the European Handball Federation's third-tier competition for men's handball clubs, running from 6 October 2001 to 28 April 2002. It was won by Skjern Håndbold from Denmark, which was their first ever international title.

== Knockout stage ==
=== Round 2 ===
Team 1	Agg.	Team 2	1st leg	2nd leg
SSV Forst Brixen (Italy)	40–50	(France) US Ivry Handball	19–21	21–29
Os Belenenses (Portugal)	77–69	(Romania) CSU Ulplimex Galati	43–40	34–29
SPE Strovolos (Cyprus)	53–59	(Russia) KAI Zilant Kazan	25–25	28–34
Metalurg Skopje (North Macedonia)	56–67	(Denmark) Skjern Håndbold	31–34	25–33
OLKOM Melitopol (Ukraine)	68–30	(Moldova) CS Baracuda	34–20	34–10
SK Reval Sport (Estonia)	w/o	(Bosnia and Herzegovina) RK Borac Banja Luka	–	–
Handballclub Fivers Margareten (Austria)	43–51	(Switzerland) BSV Wacker Thun	22–21	21–30
IFK Skövde (Sweden)	46–41	(Greece) Ionikos Nea Filadelfeia	22–21	24–20
HC Tbilisi (Georgia (country))	32–91	(Bosnia and Herzegovina) RK Izviđač Ljubuški	16–47	16–44

=== Round 3 ===
Team 1	Agg.	Team 2	1st leg	2nd leg
Aguas Santas (Portugal)	44–47	(Denmark) Skjern Håndbold	26–20	18–27
OLKOM Melitopol (Ukraine)	27–55	(Poland) Śląsk Wrocław	14–28	13–27
BSV Wacker Thun (Switzerland)	54–42	(Netherlands) De Groot Groep	29–20	25–22
Os Belenenses (Portugal)	58–63	(Russia) SKIF Krasnodar	31–30	27–33
BelAUTOService Novopolotsk (Belarus)	55–57	(Luxembourg) HC Bascharage	25–35	30–22
SK Reval Sport (Estonia)	56–52	(Turkey) Trabzon Belediyespor	31–25	25–27
RK Jugović (Federal Republic of Yugoslavia)	47–50	(Romania) HCM Constanța	31–23	16–27
G.A.C. Kilkis (Greece)	75–56	Cyprus College	41–26	34–30
KAI Zilant Kazan (Russia)	48–49	(North Macedonia) RK Pelister	23–22	25–27
Paris St. Germain (France)	50–45	(Iceland) Fram Reykjavik	24–23	26–22
Shakhtar-Akademiia Donetsk (Ukraine)	54–41	(Belgium) Initia HC Hasselt	30–24	24–17
RK Iskra Bugojno (Bosnia and Herzegovina)	48–60	(Italy) Pallamano Rubiera	18–28	30–32
Ula Varena (Lithuania)	38–56	(Switzerland) TV Suhr	17–34	21–22
Frederiksberg IF (Denmark)	45–41	(Bosnia and Herzegovina) RK Izviđač Ljubuški	25–23	20–18
US Ivry Handball (France)	40–38	(Sweden) Lunds HK Ajar	23–19	17–19
IFK Skövde (Sweden)	55–55 (a)	(Austria) Alpla HC Hard	32–28	23–27

=== Round 4 ===
Team 1	Agg.	Team 2	1st leg	2nd leg
Shakhtar-Akademiia Donetsk (Ukraine)	55–56	(Denmark) Skjern Håndbold	31–31	24–25
Paris Saint-Germain Handball (France)	59–59 (a)	(North Macedonia) RK Pelister	33–30	26–29
HCM Constanța (Romania)	46–50	(Poland) Śląsk Wrocław	30–26	16–24
Pallamano Rubiera (Italy)	58–49	(Luxembourg) HC Bascharage	34–22	24–27
SKIF Krasnodar (Russia)	46–47	(Greece) G.A.C. Kilkis	26–19	20–28
Frederiksberg IF (Denmark)	39–38	(Austria) Alpla HC Hard	27–18	12–20
SK Reval Sport (Estonia)	37–67	(France) US Ivry Handball	20–37	17–30
BSV Wacker Thun (Switzerland)	52–62	(Switzerland) TV Suhr	31–30	21–32

=== Quarterfinals ===
Team 1	Agg.	Team 2	1st leg	2nd leg
RK Pelister (North Macedonia)	52–51	(Greece) G.A.C. Kilkis	27–22	25–29
Śląsk Wrocław (Poland)	48–48 (a)	(France) US Ivry Handball	30–24	18–24
Frederiksberg IF (Denmark)	56–52	(Switzerland) TV Suhr	34–24	22–28
Pallamano Rubiera (Italy)	46–58	(Denmark) Skjern Håndbold	20–30	26–28

=== Semifinals ===
Team 1	Agg.	Team 2	1st leg	2nd leg
Frederiksberg IF (Denmark)	60–61 (p)	(North Macedonia) RK Pelister	31–25	29–36
US Ivry Handball (France)	47–59	(Denmark) Skjern Håndbold	24–26	23–33

=== Final ===
Team 1	Agg.	Team 2	1st leg	2nd leg
RK Pelister (North Macedonia)	44–54	(Denmark) Skjern Håndbold	27–20	17–34
