= Filip Čurlevski =

Macedonian handball player

Personal information
- Nationality: Macedonian
- Born: 22 February 1992 (age 34) Bitola, Macedonia
- Height: 1.77 m (5 ft 10 in)

Sport
- Sport: Handball
- Position: Centre back
- Current club: GrIFK
- Number: 18

Senior clubs
- Years: Team
- –2014: RK Pelister
- 2014–2016: RK Vardar Junior
- 2016–2020: RK Eurofarm Pelister
- 2020: RK Prilep 2010
- 2020–2023: Sjundeå IF
- 2023–: GrIFK
National team
Years	Team	Apps	(Gls)
2018–	Macedonia	7	(1)

Filip Čurlevski (Macedonian: Филип Чурлевски) (born 22 February 1992) is a Macedonian handball player who plays for GrIFK and the Macedonian national team.

He represented Macedonia at the 2019 World Men's Handball Championship.
