= Aleksa Kolaković =

Serbian handball player (born 1997)

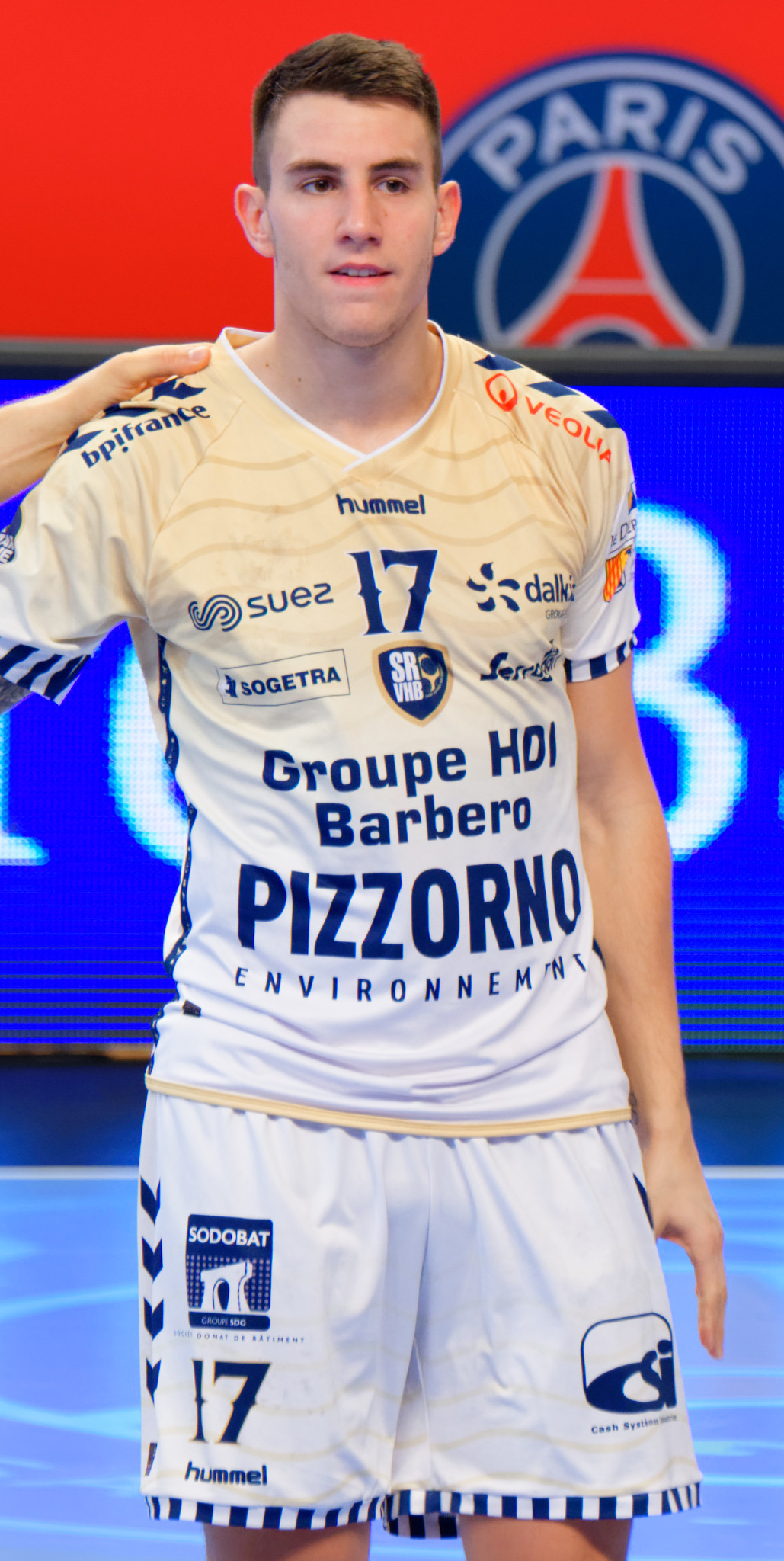
- Aleksa Kolakovic in 2016

Personal information
- Nationality: Serbian
- Born: 10 August 1997 (age 29) Podgorica, Montenegro, FR Yugoslavia
- Height: 1.92 m (6 ft 4 in)

Sport
- Sport: Handball
- Position: Centre back
- Current club: Saint-Raphael Var
- Number: 17

Youth career
- Years: Team
- 2005–2013: RK Cepelin
- 2013–2014: RD Slovan
- 2014–2018: Saint-Raphael Var

Senior clubs
- Years: Team
- 2018–2022: Saint-Raphael Var
- 2022–2024: C' Chartres MHB
- 2024–: Billère Handball
National team
Years	Team	Apps	(Gls)
2019–	Serbia	6	(9)

Aleksa Kolaković (born 10 August 1997) is a Serbian handball player for Saint-Raphael Var Handball and the Serbian national team.

== Personal life ==
Aleksa's father, Igor, is currently the coach of the Iran men's national volleyball team, he was also the coach of Serbia men's national volleyball team for 8 years and he won 7 medals. Igor is Bachelor of business administration, graduated in 1989 of University of Montenegro Faculty of Economics. Aleksa's mother, Sandra, was professional handball player, she won champions league with RK Krim in 2001, and she also has a bronze medal from world championship in Italy in 2001 with Yugoslavian women's national handball team.

== Career ==
Aleksa started playing handball at age of 7, his first handball steps he made in RK Gorica in 2004. RK Gorica was women's handball club and the only club at that moment in Podgorica. In 2005, first men's handball club arrives in Podgorica and Aleksa moves to it. RK Cepelin was led by Miodrag Misko Popovic, ex. coach of Montenegro national team and former of lot of players such as Draško Mrvaljević, Vuko Borozan, Vladan Lipovina... After 8 years spent in RK Cepelin, Aleksa moves to Slovenia and he starts playing for RD Slovan in Ljubljana. After one year of good work with Bojan Čotar, ex. assist coach of Slovenia men's national handball team, Aleksa will move to France and he will continue his career in Saint-Raphael Var Handball where he's still playing.

== National teams ==
Aleksa's road to national team was really difficult. He started playing for youth national team of Montenegro, he didn't participate in any official game. After 2 years of pause, he started playing for youth national team of Serbia and he did two competitions. In 2014, he participated in U18 European championship with Serbia, and they finished 13th out of 16 teams. In 2015, he was not on the list of 16 players for U18 World championship which took place in Russia. In 2016, he played U20 European championship in Denmark and he finished in 14th place.
