= Filip Ivić =

Croatian handball player (born 1992)

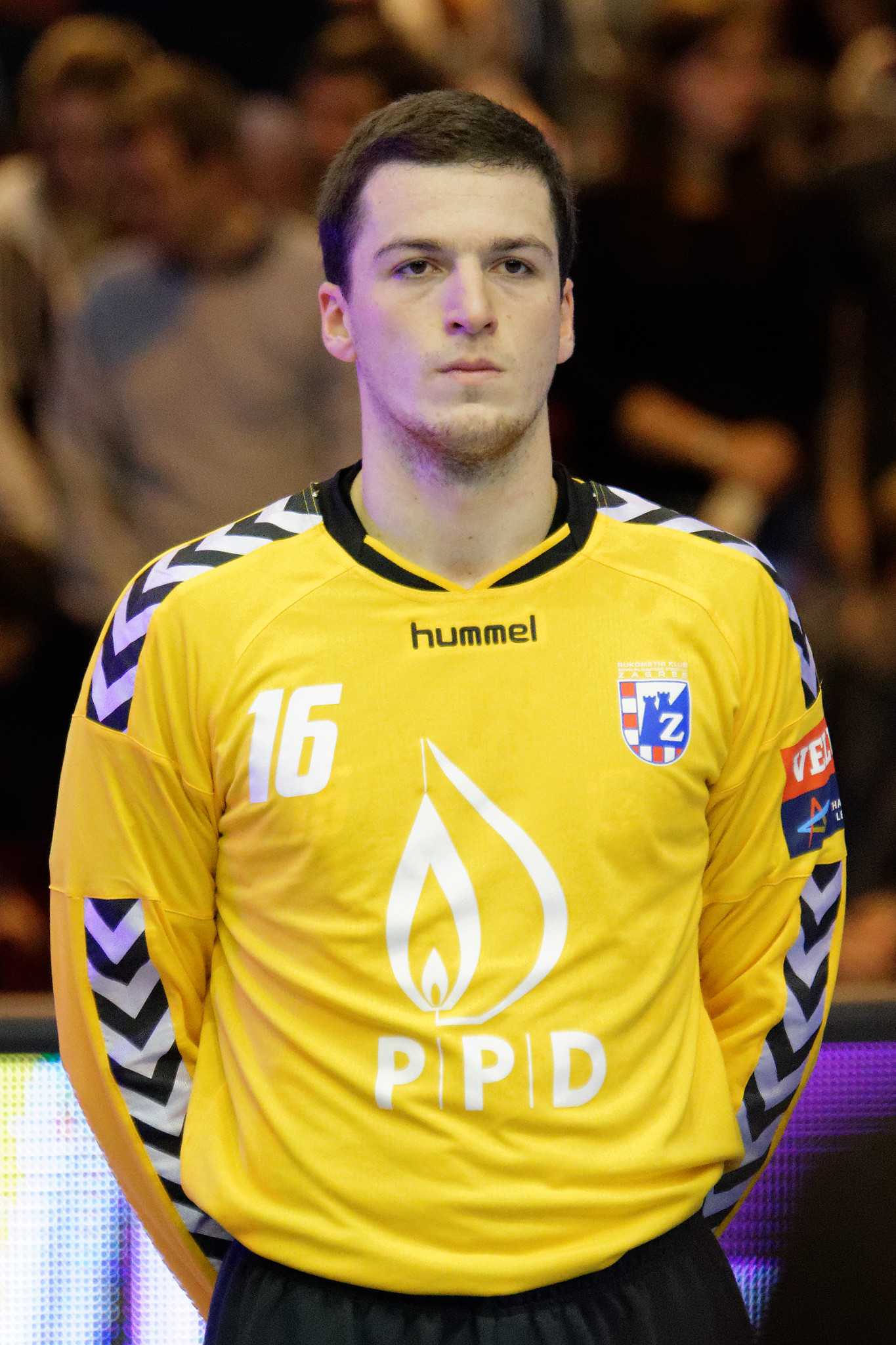

Personal information
- Nationality: Croatian
- Born: 30 August 1992 (age 34) Zagreb, Croatia
- Height: 1.95 m (6 ft 5 in)

Sport
- Sport: Handball
- Position: Goalkeeper
- Current club: HC Meshkov Brest
- Number: 16

Senior clubs
- Years: Team
- 2010–2016: RK Zagreb
- 2016–2019: PGE Vive Kielce
- 2019–2020: VfL Gummersbach
- 2020–2021: RK Celje
- 2021–2022: RK Zagreb
- 2022–2024: Chambéry SMB HB
- 2024–2025: RK Eurofarm Pelister
- 11/2025–: HC Meshkov Brest
National team
Years	Team	Apps	(Gls)
2013–	Croatia	43	(0)

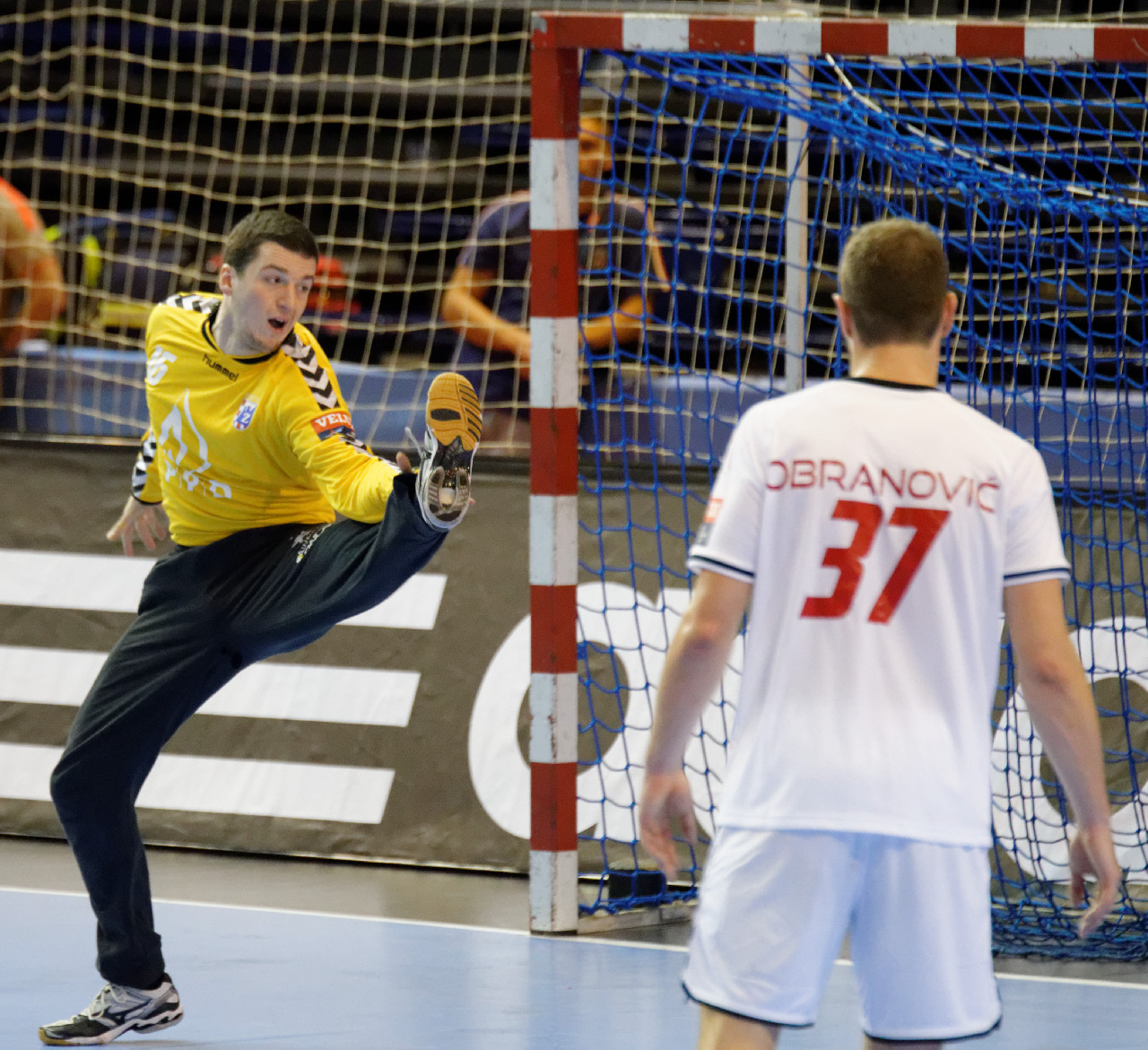
Ivić in 2015

Filip Ivic (born 30 August 1992) is a Croatian handball player who plays for HC Meshkov Brest.
