= 1995–96 EHF Cup Winners' Cup =

1995-96 EHF Cup Winners' Cup
- Dates: 2 September 1995 - 20 April 1996

Final positions
- Champions: TBV Lemgo (1st title)
- Runners-up: TEKA Santander

The 1995–96 EHF Cup Winners' Cup season, TBV Lemgo won the Europe's club handball tournament. FC Barcelona were the reigning champions. TBV Lemgo won their first title, beating CB Cantabria in the final.

== Knockout stage ==
Team 1	Agg.	Team 2	1st leg	2nd leg
Halkbank Ankara (Turkey)	65-40	(Azerbaijan) Umud Baku	35-18	30-22
Red Star (Serbia)	77-32	(Cyprus) Grammar School Nicosia	43-20	34-12
Lokomotive Warna (Bulgaria)	?	(Georgia (country)) Mimi Samtredia Tbilisi	?	?

=== Round of 32 ===
Team 1	Agg.	Team 2	1st leg	2nd leg
RK Velenje (Slovenia)	36-44	(Germany) TBV Lemgo	14-17	22-27
HK Drott Halmstad (Sweden)	38-44	(Switzerland) BSV Borba Luzern	20-20	18-24
Viking Stavanger (Norway)	44-50	(Iceland) KA Akureyri	24-23	20-27
Handball Esch (Luxembourg)	31-68	(Spain) CB Cantabria Santander	17-35	14-33
Red Star (Socialist Federal Republic of Yugoslavia)	61-55	(Hungary) Győri ETO KC	34-25	27-30
RK Pelister Bitola (North Macedonia)	48-46	(Denmark) Roar Roskilde	28-20	20-26
RVR Riga (Latvia)	47-76	(Spain) SD Octavio Vigo	23-39	24-37
HRK Karlovac (Croatia)	42-58	(France) OM Vitrolles	20-25	22-33
Minaur Baia Mare (Romania)	73-49	(Lithuania) Ūla Varėna	39-27	34-22
Kaustik Volgograd (Russia)	?	(Belgium) KV Sasja HC Hoboken	?	?
FC Porto (Portugal)	40-45	(Austria) HC Bruck	25-25	15-20
KS Iskra Kielce (Poland)	60-46	(Ukraine) CSKA Kyiv	28-22	32-24
Halkbank Ankara (Turkey)	44-38	(Bulgaria) Lokomotive Warna	23:17	21-21
Pallamano Rubiera (Italy)	36-37	(Czech Republic) HC Baník Karviná	15:15	21-22
A.C. Xini Athens (Greece)	33-37	(Israel) Hapoel Rechovot	19:15	14-22
HV Sittardia (Netherlands)	38-44	(Slovakia) TJ VSŽ Košice	18-23	20-21

=== Round of 16 ===
Team 1	Agg.	Team 2	1st leg	2nd leg
TBV Lemgo (Germany)	53-45	(Russia) Kaustik Volgograd	28–24	25–21
KA Akureyri (Iceland)	57–59	(Slovakia) TJ VSZ Kosice	33–28	24–31
RK Pelister (North Macedonia)	46–35	(Israel) Hapoel Rehovot	23–21	23–14
Academia Octavio Vigo (Spain)	57–59	(Poland) Jskra Ceresit Kielce	28–24	29–35
BSV Borba Luzern (Switzerland)	63–48	(Turkey) Halkbank Ankara	28–18	35–29
Red Star Belgrade (Serbia and Montenegro)	55–52	(Czech Republic) Banik Karvina	29–18	26–34
OM Vitrolles (France)	60–36	(Romania) Minaur Baia Mare	29–18	31–18
TEKA Santander (Spain)	56–36	(Austria) Sparkasse Stadt Werke Bruck	27–20	29–16

=== Quarterfinals ===
Team 1	Agg.	Team 2	1st leg	2nd leg
RK Pelister (North Macedonia)	51–49	(Poland) Jskra Ceresit Kielce	29–19	22–30
Red Star Belgrade (Serbia and Montenegro)	59–46	(Switzerland) BSV Borba Luzern	33–23	26–23
TBV Lemgo (Germany)	57–37	(Slovakia) TJ VSZ Kosice	31–16	26–21
TEKA Santander (Spain)	47-46	(France) OM Vitrolles	27-20	20-26

=== Semifinals ===
Team 1	Agg.	Team 2	1st leg	2nd leg
TEKA Santander (Spain)	44–39	(Serbia and Montenegro) Red Star Belgrade	25–19	19–20
TBV Lemgo (Germany)	48-47	(North Macedonia) RK Pelister	25-23	23-24

=== Finals ===
Team 1	Agg.	Team 2	1st leg	2nd leg
TBV Lemgo (Germany)	49-45	(Spain) TEKA Santander	24–19	25–26

EHF Cup Winners' Cup 1995-96
Winner

TBV Lemgo
