= RK Eurofarm Pelister =

Handball club in North Macedonia

- Full name: Rakometen klub Eurofarm Pelister Bitola
- Short name: Pelister
- Founded: 1955; 71 years ago
- Arena: Sports Hall Boro Čurlevski
- Capacity: 3,500
- President: Zoran Sterjev
- Head coach: Lino Červar
- Captain: Filip Kuzmanovski
- League: Macedonian Super League; Regional League
- 2025–26: Macedonian Super League, 2nd
- Club colours
| Home | Away |

Active departments of Pelister
| FK Pelister | RK Eurofarm Pelister 2 | KK Pelister |

RK Eurofarm Pelister (Macedonian: РК Еурофарм Пелистер) is a Macedonian handball club from Bitola. They currently compete in the Macedonian Super League, the Regional League, and the EHF European League.

== History ==
The original team was the first handball club in Macedonia, formed in 1946 under the name Pelagonija. It later changed its name to Pelister in 1955. The 60s were very successful, winning 4 championships starting in 1960 till the last one in 1969. The club ended up winning three more titles in the 70s. In the 80s, the 1981 season was the last winning season, capturing their 8th Macedonian league title. From the 1983-84 season, Pelister began participating regularly in the Yugoslav Handball Championship. They finished in third place in 1985 and were runners-up in back-to-back seasons (1986–87 and 1987–88) behind the dominant club Metaloplastika Šabac. Around that time the slogan "He who hasn't played in Bitola doesn't know what real support looks like" gained popularity, being uttered by the likes of Vlado Šola, Lino Červar and Zlatan Saračević.

Pelister became the first Macedonian club to play in Europe. In 1986 they defeated Filippos Verias in the 1st round, but they ended up losing in 1/8 finals against Atlético Madrid winning 24:19 at home and 10:19 away (34:38) on aggregate. In the 1988/1989 season they reached the EHF Cup quarterfinal, eliminating SPE Strovolos Nicosia, HC Banik and finally losing out to German club ASK Vorwärts. The first leg in Bitola was won by six goals, but the second leg in Berlin resulted in a loss by seven points 22:16 and 13:22 (35:38). When the Macedonian Handball Super League was formed in 1992, Pelister became the most successful club in the country, winning five league titles and five Cups that decade. In 1996, they made it to the semi-finals of the EHF Cup Winners' Cup where they lost on aggregate by one goal to the eventual champion TBV Lemgo. A record, 3,200 spectators were in attendance for the rematch in Bitola. Another proof of Pelisters' dominance at the time, seven players on Macedonia's squad at the 1999 World Men's Handball Championship in Egypt played for the club.

The club's most successful European run was made during the 2001/02 season when they played in the EHF Challenge Cup. First, they started by beating Zilant Kazan in the 3rd round and advanced to round 4, where they went on to defeat Paris Saint-Germain. In the quarterfinal they got past GAS Kilkis 52-51, setting up a semifinal match-up with Frederiksberg IF. Pelister would go on to win that tie in dramatic fashion in Bitola, when Naumče Mojsovski scored a goal in the final seconds of the game to even the score on aggregate, going through on a penalty shootout by the final score of 61-60. In the final, Pelister lost to Skjern Håndbold, but even in that match-up they still ended up winning the home game by 7 goals. Proving yet again that it was no easy task for any road team to win in Bitola.

In 2005, Trifun Kostovski with Kometal became sponsor of the club bringing back the glory days, winning another double crown and capturing its sixth domestic league title, which was a record at the time. However, the success was short lived as Kometal left following that season. Afterwards, Pelister was marred by financial problems and struggled to achieve the same level of success.

On 29 November 2019, a joint ownership was signed by the owners of RK Eurofarm Rabotnik (which was formed in 2011 and owned by Eurofarm) and RK Pelister (owned by Bitola Municipality). According to the platform, RK Eurofarm Rabotnik would change the name to Eurofarm Pelister, and the original RK Pelister would change its name to Eurofarm Pelister 2. Eurofarm Pelister will be the leading club with high European ambitions, while Eurofarm Pelister 2 will be a developmental club filled with young handball players from Bitola and all of Macedonia. The combination of a strong sponsor and a sports brand known throughout the former Yugoslavia took final shape through an agreement with the city administration in 2020. Eurofarm Pelister has already surpassed the domestic framework, played in the EHF Champions League and set the contours of a team that could return trophies back to "Boro Čurlevski" arena. This was officially accomplished in May 2023, when they were crowned Macedonian Super League champions for the first time in 18 years.

== Accomplishments ==
=== Domestic competitions (North Macedonia) ===
Macedonian League (20)

- Macedonian Republic League

Winner: 1961, 1966, 1968, 1969, 1970, 1971, 1979 and 1981

- Macedonian Handball Super League

Winner: 1993, 1994, 1996, 1998, 2000, 2005, 2023, 2024 and 2025

Macedonian Cup (9)

- Macedonian Republic Cup

Winner: 1990

- Macedonian Handball Cup

Winner: 1994, 1996, 1998, 1999 and 2005

- Macedonian Super Cup

Winner: 2021, 2022 and 2025

=== Individual club awards ===
- Double Crown

Winner: 1995–96, 1997–98 and 2004–05

=== International ===
- Doboj International Handball Tournament

Winner: 1996 and 1997

=== Regional ===
- SEHA League

3rd: 2021–22

=== European competitions (European Union) ===
- EHF Cup Winners' Cup

3rd: 1995-96

- EHF Challenge Cup

2nd: 2001–02

=== European record ===
As of 06/08/2026

- EHF Challenge Cup

2001–02 – Final
2006–07 – 1/8 Final
2009–10 – 3rd Round
2014–15 – 3rd Round
2016–17 – Last 16
2017–18 – 3rd Round

- EHF Cup Winners' Cup

1995–96 – 1/2 Final
1999–00 – 3rd Round
2003–04 – 3rd Round
2004–05 – 2nd Round
2007–08 – 2nd Round
2011–12 – 3rd Round

- EHF European League

1986-87 – 1/8 Final
1987-88 – 1/8 Final
1988-89 – 1/4 Final
1997–98 – 1/8 Final
2010–11 – 3rd Round
2018–19 – Group stage
2020-21 – Last 16
2021-22 – Last 16
2022-23 – Group stage

- EHF Champions League

1993-94 – Preliminary round
1994-95 – Preliminary round
1996-97 – Round of 32
1998-99 – Round of 32
2005–06 – Group stage
2019–20 – Group stage
2023–24 – Group stage
2024–25 – Group stage
2025–26 – Group stage

=== EHF ranking ===
As of 25/06/2026

| Rank | Team | Points |
|---|---|---|
| 26 | (Bosnia and Herzegovina) RK Izviđač | 96 |
| 27 | (Germany) Rhein-Neckar Löwen | 94 |
| 28 | (North Macedonia) RK Eurofarm Pelister | 92 |
| 29 | (Portugal) S.L. Benfica | 91 |
| 30 | (Spain) Bidasoa Irun | 91 |

== Arena ==
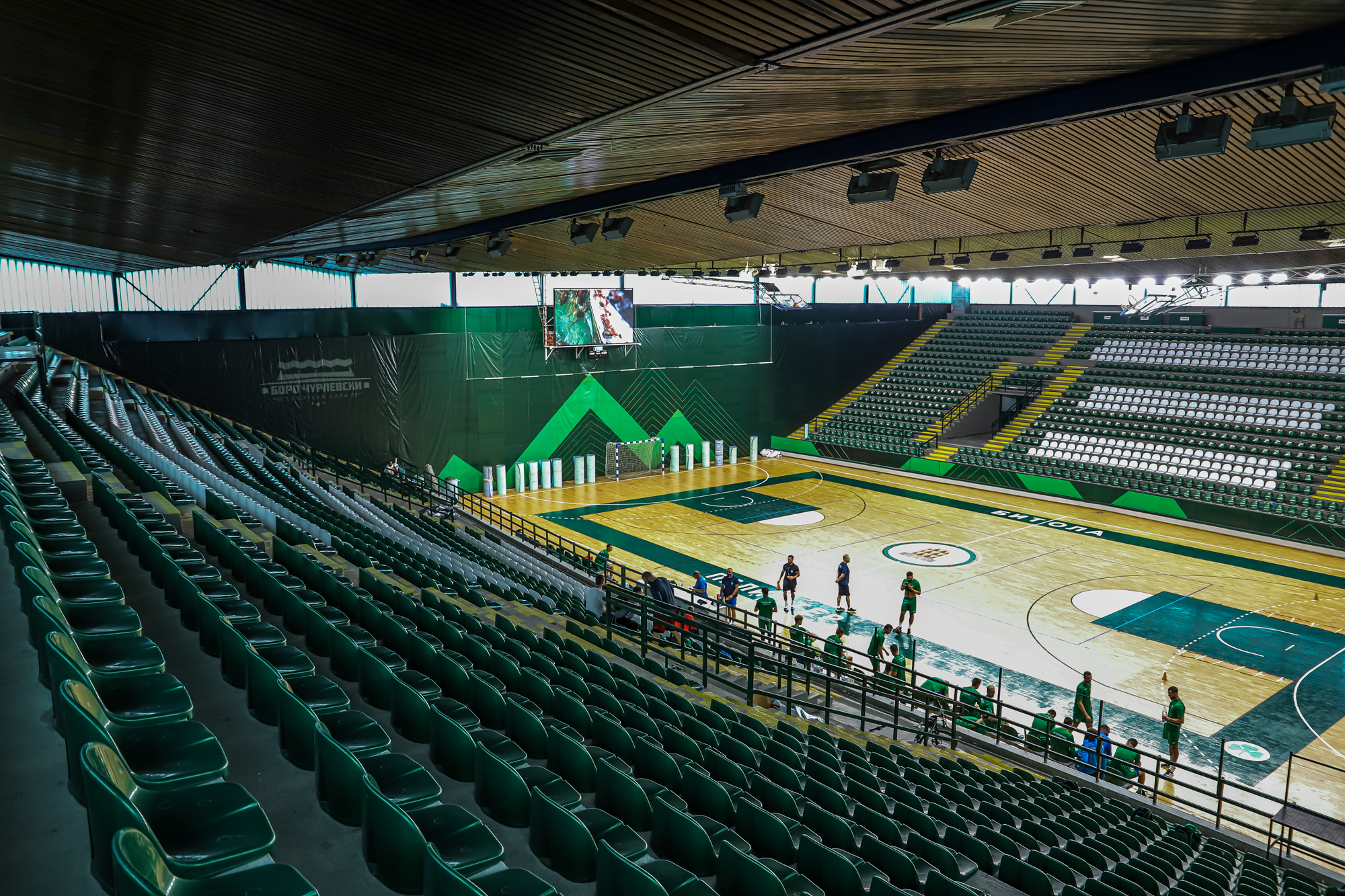
Sports Hall Boro Churlevski - Bitola

Eurofarm Pelister play all their home matches in the EHF Champions League and domestic competitions at Sports Hall Boro Čurlevski. The arena has a current seating capacity of 3,500 and has undergone numerous renovations to meet EHF standards.

== Team ==
=== Current squad ===
Squad for the 2026–27 season

Goalkeepers

- 1 (North Macedonia) Nikola Mitrevski
- 24 (North Macedonia) David Brestovac
- 32 (Iran) Saeid Heidarirad

Left Wingers

- 8 (North Macedonia) Cvetan Kuzmanoski
- 33 (North Macedonia) Petar Atanasijevikj

Right Wingers

- 3 (North Macedonia) Nenad Belistojanoski
- 11 (Bosnia and Herzegovina) Edvin Dželilović
- 77 (Brazil) Rudolph Hackbarth

Line players

- 6 (North Macedonia) Samoil Ristevski
- 14 (Croatia) Nikola Grahovac
- 44 (North Macedonia) Zharko Peshevski

Left Backs

- 15 (Slovenia) Nik Henigman
- 18 (North Macedonia) Filip Kuzmanovski (c)
- 88 (North Macedonia) Pavle Atanasijevikj
- 99 (Slovenia) Malik Tatar

Central Backs

- 23 (North Macedonia) Mirche Kalajdjieski
- 81 (Serbia) Aleksa Kolaković
- 91 (France) Sadou Ntanzi

Right Backs

- 4 (Poland) Andrzej Widomski
- 5 (Croatia) Diego Bassanese
- 7 (North Macedonia) Martin Serafimov

=== Transfers ===
Transfers for the 2026–27 season

Joining

- (Slovenia) Malik Tatar (LB) (from (Slovenia) RD Slovan)
- (Slovenia) Miha Kotar (CB) (from (Serbia) RK Partizan)
- (Serbia) Aleksa Kolaković (CB) (from (France) Pau Billère Handball)
- (France) Sadou Ntanzi (CB) (from (Qatar) Al Arabi SC)
- (North Macedonia) Martin Serafimov (RB) (free agent)
- (Croatia) Diego Bassanese (RB) (from (Croatia) RK Umag)
- (Bosnia and Herzegovina) Edvin Dželilović (RW) (from (Bosnia and Herzegovina) RK Izviđač)
- (North Macedonia) Nenad Belistojanoski (RW) (from (North Macedonia) RK Eurofarm Pelister 2)

Leaving

- (North Macedonia) Dejan Manaskov (LW) (to ?)
- (Serbia) Ilija Abutović (LB) (to (Serbia) RK Partizan)
- (Slovenia) Domen Tajnik (CB) (to (Slovenia) RD Slovan)
- (Bosnia and Herzegovina) Omer Mehmedović (CB) (to (Austria) HC Linz AG)
- (Bosnia and Herzegovina) Alem Hadžić (CB) (to (Germany) HSV Hamburg)
- (Slovenia) Miha Kotar (CB) (on loan at (Montenegro) RK Budvanska rivijera)
- (Tunisia) Oussama Hosni (RB) (to (France) C' Chartres MHB)
- (Serbia) Bogdan Radivojević (RW) (to (Turkey) Beşiktaş JK)

=== Transfer history ===
Transfers for the 2025–26 season

Joining

- (Iran) Saeid Heidarirad (GK) from (Serbia) RK Partizan
- (Slovenia) Nik Henigman (LB) from (France) C' Chartres MHB
- (North Macedonia) Mirche Kalajdjieski (CB) from (North Macedonia) RK Eurofarm Pelister 2
- (Poland) Andrzej Widomski (RB) from (Poland) Gwardia Opole
- (Brazil) Rudolph Hackbarth (RW) from (Spain) BM Rebi Cuenca
- (Egypt) Khaled Walid (P) from (Turkey) Beşiktaş JK
- (Croatia) Nikola Grahovac (LP) from (Germany) HSG Wetzlar
- (Bosnia and Herzegovina) Omer Mehmedović (CB) from (Slovenia) RD Ribnica

Leaving

- (Croatia) Filip Ivic (GK) to (Belarus) HC Meshkov Brest
- (Serbia) (Hungary) Uroš Borzaš (LB) to (North Macedonia) RK Alkaloid
- (North Macedonia) Emilijan Gjorgovski (LB) to (North Macedonia) RK Alkaloid
- (Bosnia and Herzegovina) Pavle Petrović (RB) to (Austria) HC Linz AG
- (Slovenia) Nejc Cehte (RB) to (Germany) Füchse Berlin
- (North Macedonia) Nenad Kosteski (RW) to (North Macedonia) RK Alkaloid
- (Egypt) Mohamed Mamdouh Shebib (P) to (Greece) P.A.O.K. H.C.
- (Egypt) Khaled Walid (P) to (Egypt) Al Ahly

Transfers for the 2024–25 season

Joining

- (North Macedonia) Nikola Mitrevski (GK) from (Portugal) FC Porto
- (Croatia) Filip Ivic (GK) from (France) Chambéry SMBH
- (Serbia) Ilija Abutović (LB) from (France) C' Chartres MHB
- (Tunisia) Oussama Hosni (RB) from (Qatar) Al Arabi SC
- (Croatia) Kajo Cikatić (P) from (Croatia) HRK Gorica
- (Egypt) Mohamed Mamdouh Shebib (LP) from Kuwait SC

Leaving

- (Slovenia) Urban Lesjak (GK) to (Slovenia) RK Trimo Trebnje
- (Algeria) Khalifa Ghedbane (GK) to (Germany) HC Erlangen
- (North Macedonia) Marko Kizikj (GK) to (North Macedonia) RK Alkaloid
- (France) Rudy Seri (LB) to (France) Caen Handball
- (North Macedonia) Mario Tankoski (CB) to (North Macedonia) RK Vardar
- (Denmark) Andreas Johan Nielsen (P) to (Denmark) GOG Håndbold
- (Croatia) Kajo Cikatić (P) to (Croatia) ŽRK Zrinski
- (Poland) Mateusz Piechowski (P) to (Romania) AHC Potaissa Turda
- (Russia) Denis Vasilev (P) to (Hungary) Balatonfüredi KSE

== Staff ==
=== Professional staff ===
| Position | Name |
|---|---|
| Head coach | (Croatia) Lino Červar |
| Assistant coach | (North Macedonia) Alekso Lembanov |
| Goalkeeping coach | (North Macedonia) Ice Sokoleski |
| Conditioning coach | (North Macedonia) Aleksandar Markovski |
| Physiotherapists | (North Macedonia) Filip Milevski |
| Physiotherapists | (North Macedonia) Nebojša Vasilevski |

=== Management ===
| Position | Name |
|---|---|
| President | (North Macedonia) Zoran Sterjev |
| Vice President | (North Macedonia) Bojan Sterjev |
| Sporting Director | (North Macedonia) Zvonko Šundovski |
| Team assistant | (North Macedonia) Damjan Nikolovski |

== Former club members ==
=== Notable former players ===
- (North Macedonia) Dejan Pecakovski
- (North Macedonia) Stefan Drogrishki
- (North Macedonia) Goran Krstevski
- (North Macedonia) Tomislav Jagurinovski
- (North Macedonia) Lazo Majnov
- (North Macedonia) Zlatko Mojsoski
- (North Macedonia) Mihail Petrovski
- (North Macedonia) Goran Kuzmanoski
- (North Macedonia) Filip Čurlevski
- (North Macedonia) Gradimir Čanevski
- (North Macedonia) Blagojče Trajkovski
- (North Macedonia) Nikola Markoski
- (North Macedonia) Goce Ojleski
- (North Macedonia) Milorad Kukoski
- (North Macedonia) Martin Velkovski
- (North Macedonia) Marko Kizikj
- (North Macedonia) Mario Tankoski
- (North Macedonia) Nenad Kosteski
- (North Macedonia) Emilijan Gjorgovski
- (North Macedonia) Dejan Manaskov
- (Serbia) Bogdan Radivojević
- (Serbia) Ilija Abutović
- (Serbia) Igor Arsić
- (Serbia) Davor Čutura
- (Serbia) Miloje Dolić
- (Serbia) Milan Filić
- (Serbia) Nikola Ivanović
- (Serbia) Milan Đukić
- (Serbia) Darko Stevanović
- (Serbia) Nemanja Obradović
- (Serbia) Uroš Borzaš
- (Montenegro) Mirko Radović
- (Bosnia and Herzegovina) Marin Vegar
- (Bosnia and Herzegovina) Neven Stjepanović
- (Bosnia and Herzegovina) Josip Perić
- (Bosnia and Herzegovina) Elmir Građan
- (Bosnia and Herzegovina) Pavle Petrović
- (Bosnia and Herzegovina) Alem Hadžić
- (Croatia) Lovro Jotić
- (Croatia) Tomislav Kušan
- (Croatia) Mateo Maraš
- (Croatia) Josip Božić Pavletić
- (Croatia) Stipe Mandalinić
- (Croatia) Kajo Cikatić
- (Croatia) Filip Ivić
- (Slovenia) Anže Ratajec
- (Slovenia) Domen Tajnik
- (Slovenia) Urban Lesjak
- (Slovenia) Nejc Cehte
- (Hungary) Márton Székely
- (France) Rudy Seri
- (Denmark) Sebastian Henneberg
- (Denmark) Andreas Johann Nielsen
- (Denmark) Kasper Kisum
- (Portugal) Sérgio Barros
- (Portugal) Wilson Davyes
- (Poland) Mateusz Piechowski
- (Colombia) Santiago Mosquera
- (Cuba) Reinier Taboada
- (Russia) Denis Vasiliev
- (Ukraine) Yevgen Umovist
- (Ukraine) Vladyslav Ostroushko
- (Ukraine) Olexandr Shevelev
- (Belarus) Andrey Khapal
- (Georgia (country)) Rati Mskhvildze
- (Tunisia) Oussama Hosni
- (Tunisia) Mohamed Soussi
- (Egypt) Karim Handawy
- (Egypt) Mohamed Mamdouh Shebib
- (Egypt) Khaled Walid
- (Morocco) Achraf Adli
- (Algeria) Khalifa Ghedbane

=== Notable former coaches ===
- (North Macedonia) Cane Krstevski
- (Serbia) Zoran Zecevic
- (Serbia) Dragan Nishević
- (Romania) Bogdan Makovei
- (North Macedonia) Ivan Markovski & (North Macedonia) Aleksandar Zarkov
- (North Macedonia) Andon Boshkovski
- (North Macedonia) Ilija Temelkovski
- (North Macedonia) Stevče Aluševski
- (Serbia) Đorđe Čirković
- (Croatia) Željko Babić
- (Denmark) Lars Walther
- (North Macedonia) Aleksandar Jovikj
- (North Macedonia) Zvonko Šundovski
- (North Macedonia) Branislav Angelovski
- (Spain) Raúl Alonso
- (Spain) Rubén Garabaya

== Supporters ==
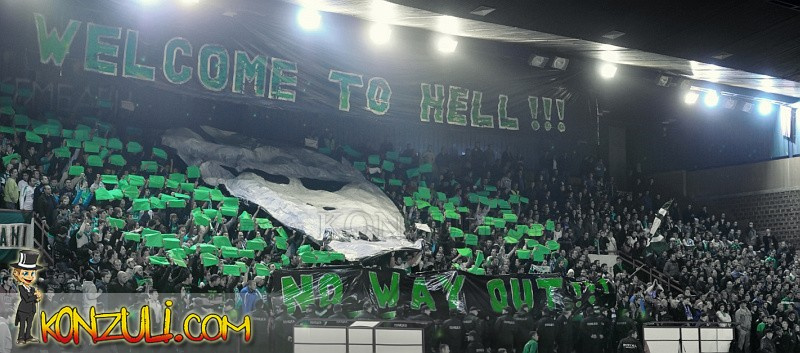
Čkembari

Čkembari (Macedonian: Чкембари) are an Ultras group, established in 1985, who support the Macedonian sports clubs from Bitola that compete under the Pelister banner, mainly FK Pelister in football and RK Pelister in handball. The group was founded in 1985 when a caravan of 15 buses traveled to support RK Pelister who was playing against Partizan Bjelovar in a handball relegation play-off match. At that time they used the name BMČM – Bitolčani, Motorcyclists, Čkembari, Macedonians (македонски: БМЧМ - Битолчани, Мотокари, Чкембари, Македонци) later shortened to just Čkembari. Soon after, the first green and white banners were created that read: "Hell Boys" (македонски: Пеколни момци) and "Green Conquerors" (македонски: Зелени освојувачи) which started organized support for Pelister at every match.
