= Nikola Mitrevski =

Macedonian handball player (born 1985)

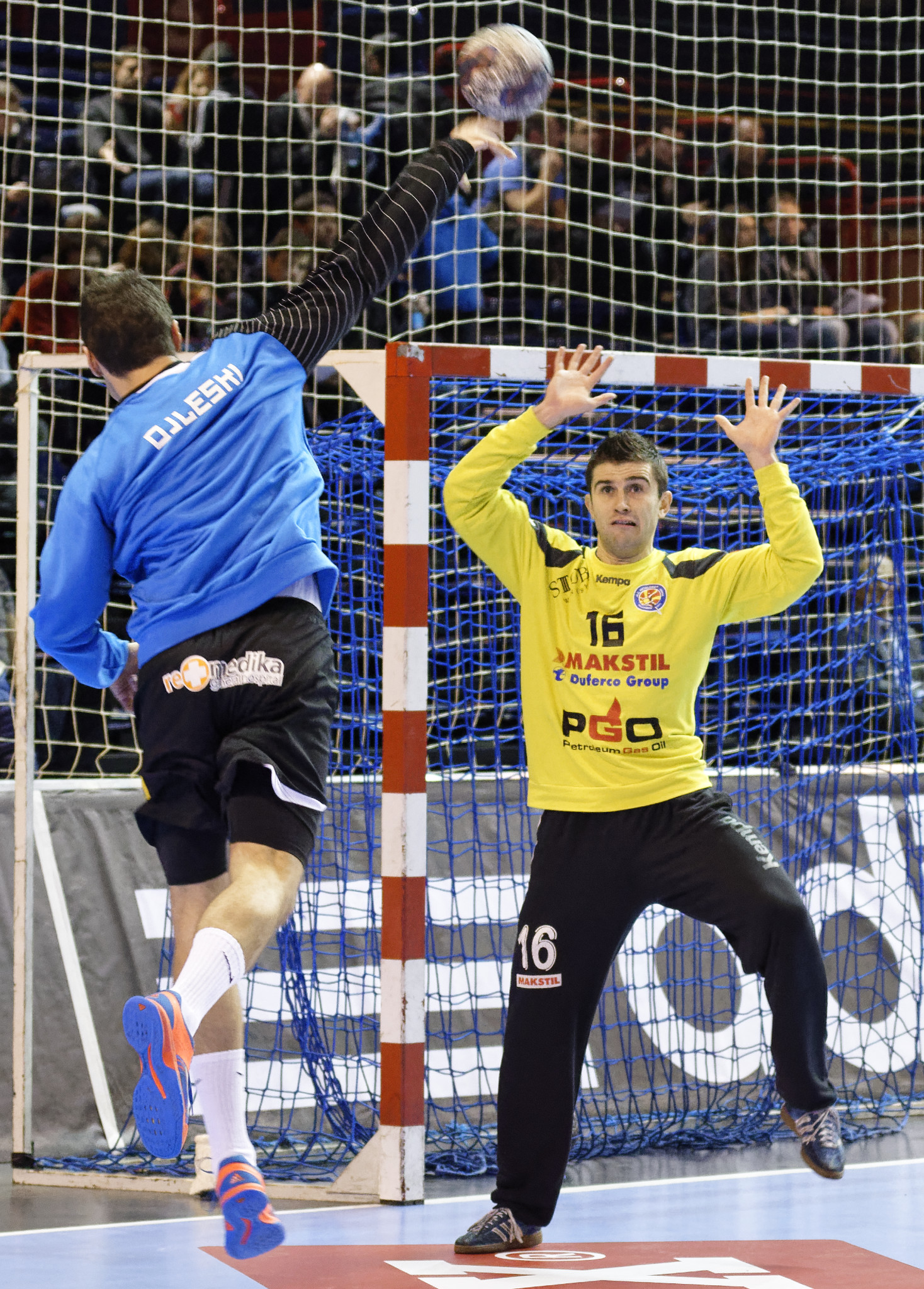

Personal information
- Nationality: Macedonian
- Born: 3 October 1985 (age 41) Bitola, Macedonia, Yugoslavia
- Height: 1.88 m (6 ft 2 in)

Sport
- Sport: Handball
- Position: Goalkeeper
- Current club: RK Eurofarm Pelister
- Number: 1

Senior clubs
- Years: Team
- 2005–2007: RK Pelister
- 2007–2010: RK Vardar
- 2010–2015: RK Metalurg Skopje
- 2015–2017: S.L. Benfica
- 2017–2019: HC Dobrogea Sud
- 2019–2020: RK Eurofarm Pelister
- 2020–2024: FC Porto
- 2024–: RK Eurofarm Pelister
National team
Years	Team	Apps	(Gls)
–	North Macedonia	131	(6)
- Updated on 6 February 2025

Nikola Mitrevski (Macedonian: Никола Митревски; born 3 October 1985) is a Macedonian handball player who plays for RK Eurofarm Pelister and the National team of North Macedonia.

== Honours ==
Vardar

- Macedonian Super League: 2008–09
- Macedonia Cup: 2007–08

Metalurg

- Macedonian Super League: 2010–11, 2011–12, 2013–14
- Macedonia Cup: 2010–11, 2012–13

Benfica

- Portuguese Cup: 2015–16
- Portuguese Super Cup: 2016

HCD SUD Constanta

- Cupa României: 2017–18
- Supercupa României: 2017

Porto

- Portuguese League: 2020–21, 2021–22, 2022–23
- Portuguese Cup: 2020–21
- Portuguese Super Cup: 2021
