= Urban Lesjak =

Slovenian handball player (born 1990)

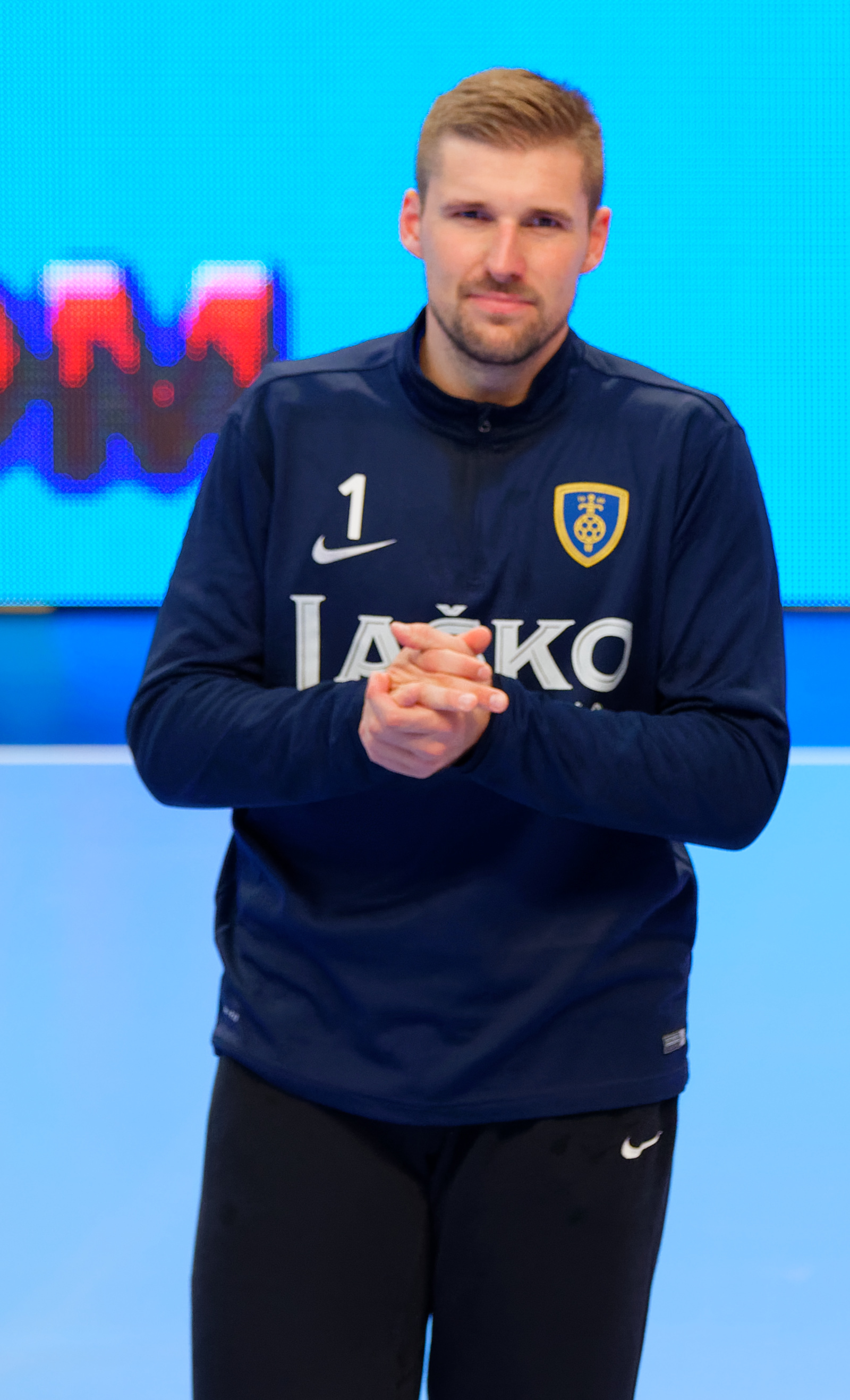
- Lesjak in 2017

Personal information
- Nationality: Slovenian
- Born: 24 August 1990 (age 36) Celje, SR Slovenia, Yugoslavia
- Height: 1.87 m (6 ft 2 in)

Sport
- Sport: Handball
- Position: Goalkeeper
- Current club: RK Trimo Trebnje
- Number: 90

Senior clubs
- Years: Team
- 2010–2018: RK Celje
- 2018–2022: TSV Hannover-Burgdorf
- 2022–2024: RK Eurofarm Pelister
- 2024–: RK Trimo Trebnje
National team
| Years | Team | Apps | (Gls) |
| 2012– | Slovenia | 99 | (0) |
Medal record
World Championship
| Bronze medal – third place | 2017 France |
- Updated on 26 January 2025

Urban Lesjak (born 24 August 1990) is a Slovenian handball player who plays for RK Trimo Trebnje and the Slovenia national team.

Lesjak has represented Slovenia internationally since 2012 at several European Championships and World Championships, as well as at the 2016 Summer Olympics and the 2024 Summer Olympics.
