= RK Cepelin =

RK Cepelin Cetinje
- Full name: Rukometni klub Cepelin Cetinje
- Short name: Cepelin
- Founded: 1995
- Arena: SRC Lovćen, Cetinje
- Capacity: 2,020 seats
- President: (Montenegro) Miodrag Miško Popović
- Head coach: (Montenegro) Blažo Popović
- League: Second Handball League
- Club colours
Home	Away

HS Cepelin was founded 25 December 1995 in Cetinje, Montenegro. In its first 15 years of existence, 1030 boys and girls attended.

== History ==
The senior team competed in the Second National League of FR Yugoslavia, group 'West', and in I and II Montenegrin leagues during the previous existence of the school. Cadets compete in the Cadets League of Montenegro. Juniors and pioneers compete in the junior and pioneer championships of Montenegro.

HS Cepelin has won the Younger Pioneers four times, the Older Pioneers six times, the Cadets four times, and the Juniors once. HS Cepelin won the championship of the FR Yugoslavia with the Older Pioneers in 1999. With the juniors team, HS “Cepelin-Lovćen osiguranje” became the Unofficial Champion of Yugoslavia in 2002. For the national team of Serbia and Montenegro, two of its players performed, and for the national team of Montenegro, 40 of its players performed. Its cadets, who are under the name “Budvanska Rivijera” (Cepelin), won 27 of a total of 28 games in the 2008/09 season and won the Cadets League of Montenegro for the second time in a row in 2009/10.
