= Paweł Podsiadło =

Polish handball player (born 1986)

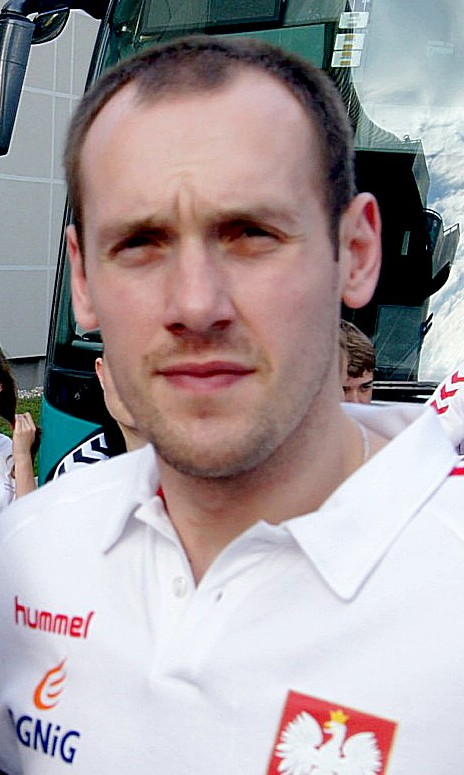

Personal information
- Nationality: Polish
- Born: 29 March 1986 (age 40) Kielce, Poland
- Height: 1.99 m (6 ft 6 in)

Sport
- Sport: Handball
- Position: Left back
- Current club: KS Azoty-Puławy
- Number: 9

Senior clubs
- Years: Team
- 2003–2011: Vive Kielce
- 2011–2014: Sélestat Alsace Handball
- 2014–2017: USAM Nîmes Gard
- 2017–: KS Azoty-Puławy
National team
Years	Team	Apps	(Gls)
2010–	Poland	9	(7)

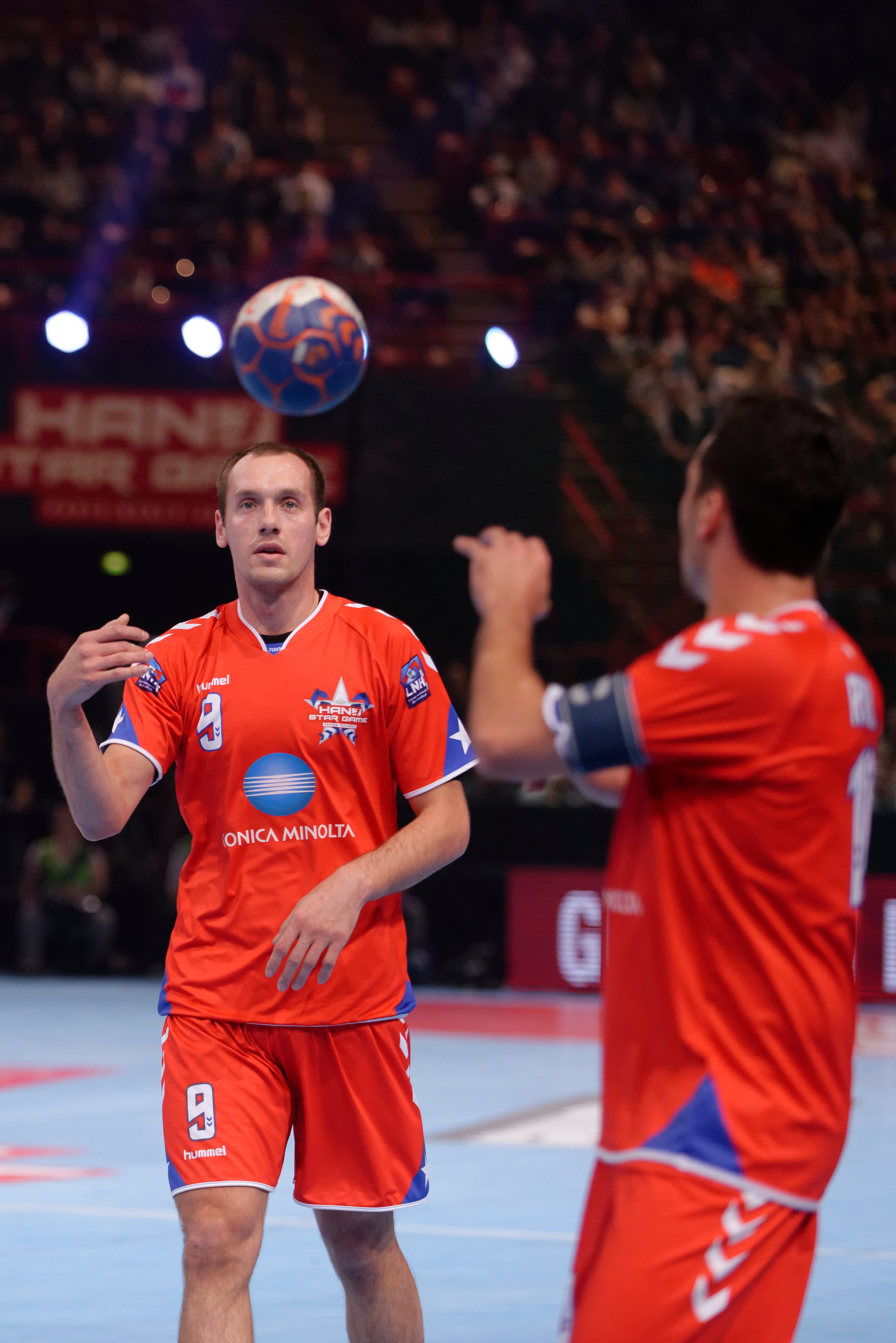
Podsiadło during the 2013 Hand Star Game.

Paweł Podsiadło (born 29 March 1986) is a Polish handball player for KS Azoty-Puławy and the Polish national team.
