= Magnus Bramming =

Danish handball player (born 1990)

Personal information
- Full name: Magnus Grubb Bramming
- Nationality: Danish
- Born: 1 October 1990 (age 36) Roskilde, Denmark
- Height: 1.82 m (6 ft 0 in)

Sport
- Sport: Handball
- Position: Left wing
- Current club: TTH Holstebro
- Number: 10

Youth career
- Years: Team
- –: Himmelev Veddelev Idrætsforening
- –: Roskilde Håndbold
- –: Viborg HK

Senior clubs
- Years: Team
- 2007–2012: Nordsjælland Håndbold
- 2012–: TTH Holstebro
National team
Years	Team	Apps	(Gls)
2016–	Denmark	18	(49)
Medal record
World Championship
Gold medal – first place	2021 Egypt
- Updated on 6 March 2025

Magnus Grubb Bramming (born 1 October 1990) is a Danish handball player for TTH Holstebro and the Danish national team. He has the club record for most appearances with over 500. He is a world champion from 2021.

== Career ==
He joined the TTH from Nordsjælland Håndbold in 2012. As a youth player he played for Viborg HK, Himmelev Håndbold, Roskilde Håndbold.

He debuted for the Danish national team on 6 November 2016. His first major international tournament was the 2020 European Championship, where Denmark finished on a disappointing 13th place.

In the 2018-2019 season he scored the second most goals in the Danish league with 166 goals, surpassed only by Anders Eggert.

At the 2021 World Championship in Cairo he was part of the extended Danish squad, when he replaced Benjamin Jakobsen. Denmark went on to win gold medals at the tournament, beating Sweden in the final.

In May 2020 he extended his contract at TTH for 5 more years. In 2024 he extended his contract at TTH until 2026.

== Private ==
He is in family with fellow handball players Oliver and Anton Bramming.

== Individual awards ==
- 2018–19 EHF Cup Top scorer: On 19 May 2019 after the final four tournament he set an all-time scoring record for an EHF Cup season, with 100 goals.
