= Miloš Vujović =

Montenegrin handball player (born 1993)

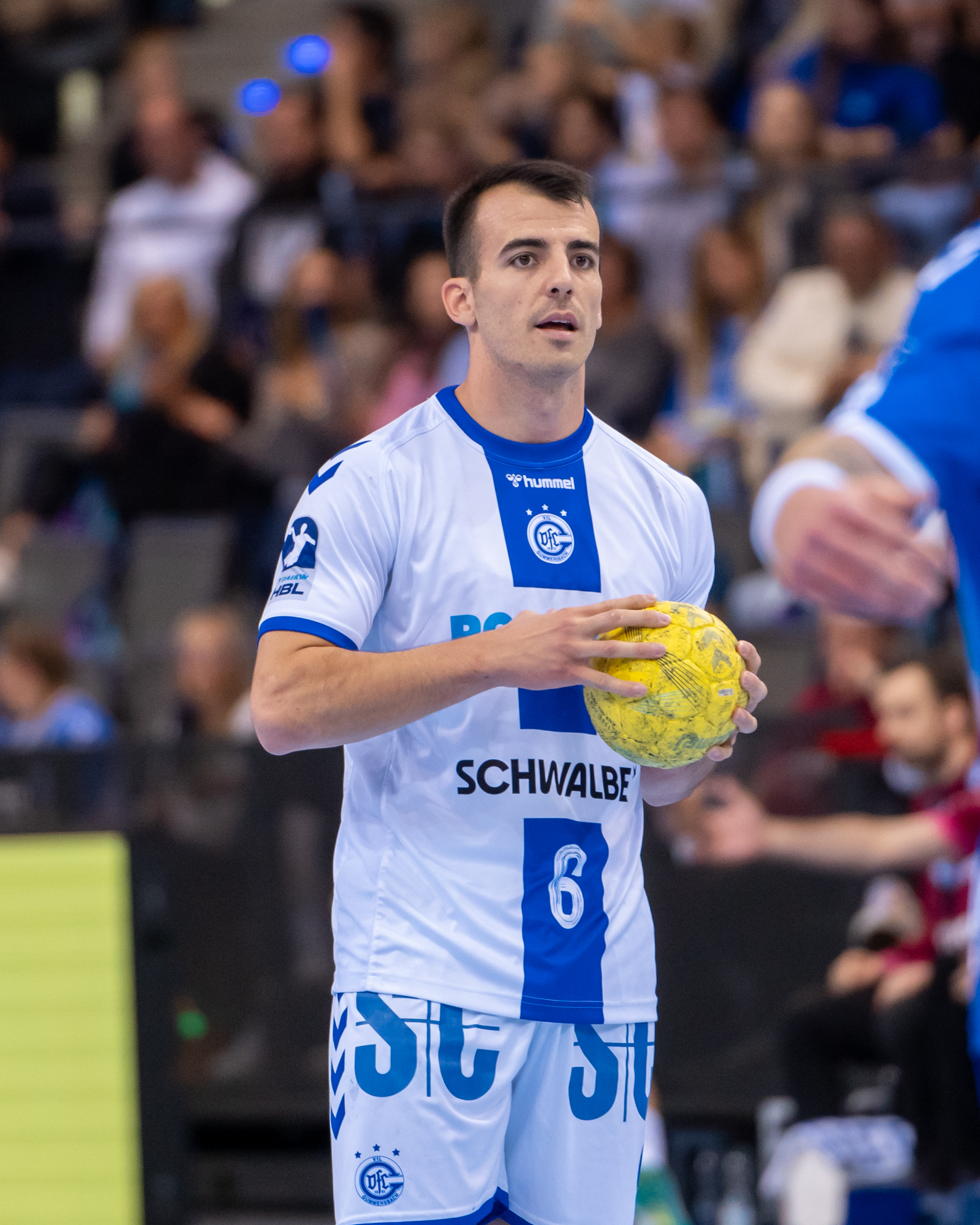

Personal information
- Nationality: Montenegrin
- Born: 5 September 1993 (age 33) Cetinje, FR Yugoslavia
- Height: 1.81 m (5 ft 11 in)

Sport
- Sport: Handball
- Position: Left wing
- Current club: VfL Gummersbach
- Number: 6

Senior clubs
- Years: Team
- 2010–2012: RK Lovćen
- 2012–2013: RK Ulcinj
- 2013–2014: RK Budvanska Rivijera
- 2014–2015: Pécsi VSE
- 2015–2020: Tatabánya KC
- 2020–2023: Füchse Berlin
- 2023–: VfL Gummersbach
National team
Years	Team	Apps	(Gls)
2012–	Montenegro	57	(192)

Miloš Vujović (born 5 September 1993) is a Montenegrin handball player for VfL Gummersbach and the Montenegrin national team.

== Honours ==
=== Club ===
Grundfos Tatabánya KC

- Nemzeti Bajnokság I
  - Bronze: 2016, 2017, 2018, 2019
- Magyar Kupa
  - Bronze: 2017

Füchse Berlin

- EHF European League
  - Gold: 2023

=== Individual ===
- Nemzeti Bajnokság I Top Scorer: 2019
- All-Star left wing of the European Championship: 2022

== Career statistics ==
Season	Club	Division	Apps	Goals	7-Meter	7-Meter Goals	2 Min	Red card	National Cup	Apps	Goals	Europa Cup	Apps	Goals
2014/15	Pécsi VSE	Nemzeti Bajnokság I/B	23	214	53	40	17	2	Magyar Kupa	6	66	-	-	-
2015/16	Grundfos Tatabánya KC	Nemzeti Bajnokság I	34	152	45	36	10	1	Magyar Kupa	1	2	EHF Cup	2	12
2016/17	Grundfos Tatabánya KC	Nemzeti Bajnokság I	26	143	58	44	4	0	Magyar Kupa	5	23	EHF Cup	10	56
2017/18	Grundfos Tatabánya KC	Nemzeti Bajnokság I	26	142	53	38	8	0	Magyar Kupa	3	19	EHF Cup	2	9
2018/19	Grundfos Tatabánya KC	Nemzeti Bajnokság I	26	180	75	60	6	0	Magyar Kupa	2	12	EHF Cup	10	61
2019/20	Grundfos Tatabánya KC	Nemzeti Bajnokság I	Cancelled											
2020/21	Füchse Berlin	Handball-Bundesliga												
