= 2025 IHF Men's U21 Handball World Championship squads =

Player listing of handball competition

This article displays the squads for the 2025 IHF Men's U21 Handball World Championship. Each team consisted of 18 players, of which 16 were fielded for each game.

Age, club, appearances and goals correct as of 18 June 2025.

== Group A ==
=== Norway ===
A 16-player squad was announced on 23 May 2025.

Head coach: (Montenegro) Žarko Pejović

No.	Pos.	Name	Date of birth (age)	Height	App.	Goals	Club
1	GK	Henrik Ibsen	16 March 2004 (aged 21)	1.84 m	32	0	(Norway) Bergen
3	RW	Kasper Bjanes Iversen	12 May 2004 (aged 21)	1.92 m	32	71	(Norway) Haslum
5	CB	Henrik Hestbek Nielsen	17 November 2004 (aged 20)	1.90 m	33	48	(Norway) Bergen
6	LB	Emil Havsgård	22 April 2004 (aged 21)	1.95 m	36	119	(Norway) Bækkelagets
8	LW	Preben Gram	4 September 2004 (aged 20)	1.82 m	23	38	(Norway) Runar
11	P	Jens Holter	25 August 2005 (aged 19)	2.00 m	26	40	(Norway) Fjellhammer
13	RB	Lasse Sunde Lid	7 June 2004 (aged 21)	2.02 m	26	113	(Denmark) Bjerringbro-Silkeborg
15	RB	David Walstad Haugstvedt	3 January 2005 (aged 20)	1.91 m	19	36	(Norway) Drammen
19	LB	Sondre Ovid Skovli	11 October 2004 (aged 20)	2.02 m	9	33	(Norway) Drammen
23	P	Axel Skaarnæs	4 May 2004 (aged 21)	1.94 m	18	33	(Norway) Bækkelagets
28	GK	Oskar Engeset-Nordanger	7 August 2005 (aged 19)	1.95 m	13	1	(Germany) Friesenheim
32	LW	Even Haugli	15 December 2004 (aged 20)	1.94 m	29	87	(Norway) Haslum
42	P	Karl Wallevik	2 September 2005 (aged 19)	1.99 m	16	27	(Norway) Bergen
44	LB	Henrik Hartz Hagen	24 April 2004 (aged 21)	1.92 m	19	31	(Norway) Fjellhammer
96	RW	Øystein Mostad	5 October 2004 (aged 20)	1.96 m	10	14	(Norway) Bergen

=== Poland ===
A 18-player squad was announced on 22 May 2025.

Head coach: Bartosz Jurecki

No.	Pos.	Name	Date of birth (age)	Height	App.	Goals	Club
5	LB	Jakub Pinda	31 May 2005 (aged 20)	1.95 m	2	5	(Poland) Górnik Zabrze
7	RB	Patryk Wasiak	31 October 2004 (aged 20)	1.94 m	26	121	(Spain) CB Ademar León
8	RB	Oliwier Kamiński	24 April 2004 (aged 21)	1.91 m	21	35	(Poland) Gwardia Opole
10	P	Franciszek Wierzbicki	7 July 2004 (aged 20)	1.79 m	23	44	(Poland) AKPR AZS AWF Biała Podlaska
16	GK	Adam Witkowski	18 August 2004 (aged 20)	1.92 m	4	0	(Poland) Pogoń Szczecin
19	CB	Oskar Czertowicz	9 February 2006 (aged 19)	1.92 m	7	8	(Germany) Flensburg-Handewitt
21	LB	Jakub Luksa	18 March 2005 (aged 20)	1.93 m	19	12	(Poland) Gwardia Opole
24	RW	Patryk Siekierka	31 August 2004 (aged 20)	1.83 m	3	5	(Poland) Wybrzeże Gdańsk
32	LW	Mikołaj Rodak	17 November 2005 (aged 19)	1.81 m	22	50	(Poland) AKPR AZS AWF Biała Podlaska
34	CB	Marcin Pepliński	16 June 2005 (aged 20)	1.81 m	18	45	(Poland) Wybrzeże Gdańsk
35	LW	Jakub Wielgucki	26 April 2004 (aged 21)	1.85 m	20	47	(Poland) Śląsk Wrocław
42	CB	Patryk Grzesik	21 June 2005 (aged 19)	1.89 m	5	7	(Poland) Piotrkowianin Piotrków Trybunalski
45	P	Paweł Kałużny	15 March 2005 (aged 20)	1.94 m	2	3	(Poland) Zagłębie Lubin
47	P	Jakub Sladkowski	14 October 2004 (aged 20)	1.98 m	26	74	(Spain) Guadalajara
57	RW	Wojciech Kozłowski	26 February 2004 (aged 21)	1.83 m	4	9	(Poland) Zagłębie Lubin
77	LB	Piotr Mielczarski	31 August 2005 (aged 19)	1.97 m	26	83	(Spain) Guadalajara
80	P	Mateusz Martyn	17 July 2004 (aged 20)	1.92 m	4	5	(Germany) Leipzig
99	GK	Jakub Wysocki	10 March 2004 (aged 21)	1.85 m	6	0	(Poland) Grunwald Poznań

=== Slovenia ===
A 18-player squad was announced on 3 June 2025.

Head coach: Klemen Luzar

No.	Pos.	Name	Date of birth (age)	Height	App.	Goals	Club
1	GK	Jan Češek	27 January 2005 (aged 20)	1.94 m	0	0	(Slovenia) Celje
2	P	Maj Jelen	31 January 2005 (aged 20)	1.98 m	10	8	(Slovenia) Koper
3	P	Lucijan Korošec	10 April 2004 (aged 21)	2.00 m	22	27	(Slovenia) Celje
4	LW	Jon Turk	21 March 2005 (aged 20)	1.83 m	0	0	(Slovenia) Celje
7	CB	Nejc Hriberšek	17 May 2005 (aged 20)	1.84 m	14	85	(Slovenia) Gorenje Velenje
8	CB	Aljuš Anžič	12 February 2008 (aged 17)	1.88 m	8	35	(Slovenia) Celje
9	RB	Luka Muhič	8 June 2004 (aged 21)	1.84 m	14	20	(Slovenia) Črnomelj
10	RW	Vanja Dragić	29 April 2006 (aged 19)	1.83 m	14	27	(Slovenia) Gorenje Velenje
12	GK	Mark Šalamon	14 October 2004 (aged 20)	1.97 m	15	0	(Slovenia) Ajdovščina
13	LW	Luka Kačičnik	13 April 2005 (aged 20)	1.82 m	15	30	(Slovenia) Celje
14	CB	Ahmed Begić	13 July 2007 (aged 17)	1.86 m	5	17	(Slovenia) Ribnica
15	LB	Lun Ključanin	11 December 2004 (aged 20)	1.90 m	22	41	(Slovenia) Ivančna Gorica
18	P	Žan Vujičić	21 April 2005 (aged 20)	1.94 m	0	0	(Slovenia) Celje
19	P	Žan Korže Lesjak	26 May 2005 (aged 20)	1.85 m	8	33	(Slovenia) Celje
20	LB	Tio Malović	24 November 2005 (aged 19)	1.94 m	21	22	(Slovenia) Celje
21	RW	Arijan Kovačević	30 October 2004 (aged 20)	1.82 m	7	25	(Slovenia) Slovan

=== Uruguay ===
A 18-player squad was announced on 16 May 2025.

Head coach: Gastón Lewi

No.	Pos.	Name	Date of birth (age)	Height	App.	Goals	Club
3	RW	Joaquín Restano	12 March 2004 (aged 21)	1.86 m	25	50	(Uruguay) Colegio Alemán
5	LB	Juan Raña	11 June 2005 (aged 20)	1.82 m	19	57	(Uruguay) Pontevedrés SyD
8	CB	Pedro Cabrera	26 April 2005 (aged 20)	1.80 m	19	27	(Italy) HB Sannio
9	LW	Facundo Odera	6 July 2004 (aged 20)	1.75 m	5	15	(Uruguay) Unión SRS
10	CB	Juan Larrosa	6 September 2005 (aged 19)	1.83 m	30	40	(Uruguay) Colegio Alemán
11	LB	Dante Dalmao	5 June 2005 (aged 20)	1.75 m	0	0	(Uruguay) Pontevedrés SyD
13	P	Amaru Fernández	25 April 2004 (aged 21)	1.87 m	30	30	(Uruguay) Unión SRS
25	RW	Federico Mazzei	13 October 2005 (aged 19)	1.83 m	5	6	(Uruguay) Colegio Alemán
31	RW	Santiago Soto	14 October 2004 (aged 20)	1.71 m	10	8	(Brazil) HB Sorocaba
40	P	Rodrigo Botti	6 May 2005 (aged 20)	1.87 m	9	16	(Uruguay) Scuola Italiana
44	RB	Emiliano Salles	7 March 2004 (aged 21)	1.77 m	20	32	(Uruguay) Scuola Italiana
54	GK	Nicolás Pinatto	3 November 2004 (aged 20)	1.81 m	19	10	(Uruguay) Pontevedrés SyD
71	GK	Mauricio Doldán	14 December 2005 (aged 19)	1.90 m	0	0	(Uruguay) Colegio Alemán
73	LB	Rodrigo Méndez	8 May 2004 (aged 21)	1.83 m	5	10	(Uruguay) Colegio Alemán
77	P	Gerónimo Kupferschmidt	19 October 2004 (aged 20)	1.90 m	5	10	(Uruguay) Colegio Alemán
88	GK	Julian Pomi	8 August 2004 (aged 20)	1.86 m	21	3	(Uruguay) Scuola Italiana
91	LB	Santiago Castro	20 August 2005 (aged 19)	1.88 m	19	35	(Uruguay) Colegio Alemán
96	RB	Joaquín Urbina	26 October 2004 (aged 20)	1.81 m	15	26	(Uruguay) Unión SRS

== Group B ==
=== Argentina ===
A 16-player squad was announced on 5 June 2025.

Head coach: Rodolfo Jung

No.	Pos.	Name	Date of birth (age)	Height	App.	Goals	Club
1	GK	Felipe Suárez	11 November 2005 (aged 19)	1.84 m	0	0	(Argentina) River Plate
2	P	Santiago Laborde	3 September 2004 (aged 20)	1.84 m	0	0	(Argentina) San Fernando
7	CB	Martín Maya	4 September 2004 (aged 20)	1.85 m	5	11	(Argentina) Boca Juniors
8	LB	Juan Gull	19 May 2004 (aged 21)	2.06 m	19	14	(Spain) Triana
11	LB	Lucas Obregón	27 November 2004 (aged 20)	1.79 m	7	34	(Argentina) NS Luján
12	GK	Lautaro Rodríguez	28 March 2005 (aged 20)	1.90 m	12	0	(Argentina) San Fernando
14	RW	Ignacio Silva Fuentes	20 May 2005 (aged 20)	1.82 m	5	0	(Argentina) SAG Ballester
17	CB	Lorenzo Ortmann	30 September 2005 (aged 19)	1.79 m	7	8	(Argentina) SAG Ballester
19	RW	Agustín Ortlieb Basualdo	26 September 2004 (aged 20)	1.75 m	12	18	(Argentina) SAG Ballester
23	LB	Nicolás Rodríguez	26 May 2004 (aged 21)	1.81 m	23	28	(Argentina) SAG Ballester
25	LB	Bruno Guerrero	21 March 2005 (aged 20)	1.82 m	0	0	(Argentina) SAG Ballester
30	RB	Nicolás Barceló	28 April 2005 (aged 20)	1.80 m	12	26	(Argentina) Club Vilo
36	CB	Tobías Ojea	13 December 2005 (aged 19)	1.82 m	12	32	(Argentina) SEDALO
41	CB	Lucas Lozano	13 June 2004 (aged 21)	1.85 m	0	0	(Spain) Erromoko Eskubaloia
77	P	Tiago Maidana	28 March 2005 (aged 20)	1.87 m	0	0	(Argentina) Juventud Unida
91	P	Nicolás Tavella	31 August 2004 (aged 20)	1.98 m	0	0	(Argentina) Quilmes

=== Austria ===
A 17-player squad was announced on 16 June 2025.

Head coach: Michael Draca

No.	Pos.	Name	Date of birth (age)	Height	App.	Goals	Club
2	P	Clemens Meleschnig	1 November 2004 (aged 20)	1.97 m	74	219	(Austria) West Wien
3	LB	Clemens Möstl	7 November 2005 (aged 19)	1.91 m	59	122	(Austria) West Wien
6	LW	Elmar Böhm	10 August 2004 (aged 20)	1.85 m	63	149	(Austria) Linz
7	LW	Nico Sager	16 August 2004 (aged 20)	1.83 m	9	30	(Austria) Ferlach
9	CB	Felix Bernkop-Schnürch	27 May 2005 (aged 20)	1.91 m	70	161	(Austria) WAT Fünfhaus
10	RB	Gabriel Kofler	3 June 2005 (aged 20)	1.85 m	68	140	(Austria) WAT Fünfhaus
11	CB	Thomas Nenadic	5 March 2004 (aged 21)	1.90 m	33	36	(Austria) Füchse
14	P	Sinan Alkic	28 September 2004 (aged 20)	1.89 m	24	43	(Austria) Krems
15	LB	Paul Hofmann	12 September 2005 (aged 19)	1.86 m	62	121	(Austria) Krems
16	GK	Marko Bogojevic	18 September 2005 (aged 19)	1.81 m	63	3	(Germany) Wölfe Würzburg
20	RW	Nils Moser	2 June 2005 (aged 20)	1.90 m	0	0	(Austria) Union St. Pölten
21	P	Jonas Kofler	3 June 2005 (aged 20)	1.85 m	22	27	(Austria) WAT Fünfhaus
23	RB	Florian Budde	15 March 2005 (aged 20)	1.85 m	0	0	(Germany) Füchse Berlin
51	GK	Leon Bergmann	17 April 2004 (aged 21)	1.96 m	67	18	(Austria) Fivers Margareten
53	RW	Julian Wieder	5 September 2006 (aged 18)	1.80 m	33	81	(Austria) Fivers Margareten
55	LB	Mats Rudnicki	16 January 2005 (aged 20)	1.93 m	45	95	(Austria) Fivers Margareten

=== Brazil ===
A 16-player squad was announced on 7 June 2025.

Head coach: André Vinícius

No.	Pos.	Name	Date of birth (age)	Height	App.	Goals	Club
5	CB	Vinicius Bertoldo	16 June 2004 (aged 21)	1.93 m	17	46	(Brazil) Pinheiros
7	LW	Kelvin Barros	24 May 2007 (aged 18)	1.85 m	0	0	(Brazil) Taubaté
11	LW	Emerson dos Santos	4 July 2005 (aged 19)	1.92 m	7	13	(Brazil) Pinheiros
12	GK	Asaph Ching	13 June 2006 (aged 19)	2.00 m	0	0	(Portugal) ABC/UMinho
14	RW	Gustavo da Silva	17 December 2004 (aged 20)	1.76 m	7	1	(Brazil) Univali
15	RW	Vinicius Perin	23 March 2005 (aged 20)	1.86 m	12	40	(Brazil) Taubaté
20	RW	João Lindoso	26 January 2005 (aged 20)	1.84 m	17	25	(Brazil) Pinheiros
22	P	Juan Marcos	17 September 2004 (aged 20)	1.92 m	8	14	(Brazil) Itajaí/AHI
23	LB	Kayky de Oliveira	31 October 2005 (aged 19)	2.00 m	0	0	(Brazil) ACISEG/Guarulhos
26	LB	Diegho de Santana	18 February 2005 (aged 20)	1.93 m	7	10	(Brazil) Pinheiros
27	RB	Rafael Uglar	24 January 2005 (aged 20)	1.88 m	0	0	(Brazil) Pinheiros
28	LB	Lucas da Silva	18 May 2004 (aged 21)	1.84 m	12	43	(Brazil) São José
47	P	Renan da Silva	19 April 2005 (aged 20)	2.02 m	1	0	(Brazil) Pinheiros
55	CB	Sydclebson de Araújo	3 April 2004 (aged 21)	1.82 m	11	14	(Brazil) SEC SN
66	LB	Gabriel de Sousa	19 June 2005 (aged 19)	1.89 m	0	0	(Brazil) ABGEC
74	GK	Guilherme Candido	31 July 2005 (aged 19)	1.90 m	29	0	(Brazil) Pinheiros
75	P	Diogo Borja	11 September 2007 (aged 17)	1.92 m	0	0	(Brazil) Pinheiros
98	GK	Guilherme Carneiro	21 March 2007 (aged 18)	1.95 m	0	0	(Brazil) ACISEG/Guarulhos

=== Hungary ===
A 18-player squad was announced on 2 June 2025.

Head coach: László Sótonyi

No.	Pos.	Name	Date of birth (age)	Height	App.	Goals	Club
5	RW	Csongor Urbán-Patocskai	5 November 2005 (aged 19)	1.94 m	3	4	(Hungary) Balatonfüredi
8	LB	Csongor Várszegi	21 June 2004 (aged 20)	1.95 m	1	0	(Hungary) PLER
11	LB	Péter Gazsó	12 April 2006 (aged 19)	1.93 m	18	34	(Hungary) NEKA
18	RW	Richárd Csanálosi	12 October 2005 (aged 19)	1.78 m	19	25	(Hungary) NEKA
20	RB	Sándor Kathi	10 June 2004 (aged 21)	1.88 m	22	78	(Hungary) NEKA
23	GK	Nándor Győri	21 November 2005 (aged 19)	1.89 m	17	1	(Hungary) NEKA
26	RB	Ádám Nagy	3 April 2005 (aged 20)	1.95 m	18	23	(Hungary) Gyöngyösi
39	LW	Ádám Juhász	29 June 2005 (aged 19)	1.92 m	15	29	(Hungary) NEKA
41	GK	György Koncz	2 October 2005 (aged 19)	1.99 m	0	0	(Hungary) Pick Szeged
46	LB	Dániel Balogh	28 October 2005 (aged 19)	2.06 m	20	17	(Hungary) Pick Szeged
54	P	Botond Balogh	5 January 2004 (aged 21)	1.86 m	19	4	(Hungary) Veszprém
71	CB	Kornél Lukács	27 October 2005 (aged 19)	1.91 m	4	4	(Hungary) Pick Szeged
72	P	Szabolcs Viski	4 October 2004 (aged 20)	1.93 m	13	18	(Hungary) NEKA
77	LB	Tamás Kovács	10 July 2004 (aged 20)	1.90 m	23	81	(Hungary) NEKA
90	CB	Levente Tóth	2 January 2005 (aged 20)	1.88 m	22	64	(Hungary) NEKA
93	LW	Zsombor Szepesi	29 May 2004 (aged 21)	1.92 m	14	26	(Hungary) Pick Szeged
97	P	Levente Szabó	11 April 2005 (aged 20)	1.95 m	15	10	(Hungary) Veszprém
99	GK	Máté Borsos	27 May 2005 (aged 20)	1.94 m	9	0	(Hungary) PLER

== Group C ==
=== Japan ===
A 20-player squad was announced on 29 May 2025.

Head coach: Kenji Toyoda

No.	Pos.	Name	Date of birth (age)	Height	App.	Goals	Club
1	GK	Shohei Yoneda	25 September 2004 (aged 20)	1.83 m	14	0	(Japan) Meijo University
2	RB	Kippei Furukawa	27 February 2004 (aged 21)	1.90 m	22	60	(Japan) Kokushikan University
5	LB	Ryo Kozakai	18 May 2004 (aged 21)	1.87 m	22	38	(Japan) University of Tsukuba
6	P	Nikita Nakaoki	24 June 2004 (aged 20)	1.92 m	20	25	(Japan) Nippon Sport Science University
7	LB	Koshiro Hori	4 July 2004 (aged 20)	1.82 m	10	34	(Japan) Osaka University of Health and Sport Sciences
9	RW	Soi Hasegawa	9 October 2004 (aged 20)	1.73 m	20	68	(Japan) Chuo University
10	LB	Jun Fujikawa	9 October 2004 (aged 20)	1.90 m	22	52	(Japan) Chuo University
12	GK	Ryo Komoda	14 June 2004 (aged 21)	1.88 m	15	1	(Japan) University of Tsukuba
13	LB	Kotaro Tachibana	21 April 2004 (aged 21)	1.83 m	22	87	(Japan) Osaka University of Health and Sport Sciences
14	RW	Ryota Matsuoka	20 August 2004 (aged 20)	1.81 m	22	45	(Japan) Meijo University
19	RB	Takuto Inoue	2 October 2004 (aged 20)	1.78 m	8	14	(Japan) Kokushikan University
20	CB	Daiki Shuto	1 April 2004 (aged 21)	1.79 m	8	9	(Japan) Kokushikan University
21	CB	Haruto Nagamori	6 July 2005 (aged 19)	1.80 m	8	38	(Japan) Chuo University
23	CB	Haruki Kawada	3 August 2005 (aged 19)	1.76 m	8	55	(Japan) University of Tsukuba
27	RW	Tsubasa Matsumoto	23 March 2005 (aged 20)	1.71 m	8	30	(Japan) Nippon Sport Science University
30	GK	Aoto Yamazaki	25 August 2004 (aged 20)	1.82 m	8	0	(Japan) Nippon Sport Science University
31	P	Daichi Nakajima	17 August 2004 (aged 20)	1.86 m	0	0	(Japan) Chuo University
32	CB	Hayato Takeshita	20 May 2004 (aged 21)	1.65 m	7	12	(Japan) Osaka University of Health and Sport Sciences

=== South Korea ===
Head coach: Kim O-kyun

No.	Pos.	Name	Date of birth (age)	Height	App.	Goals	Club
7	RB	Kang Se-hyeon	28 April 2005 (aged 20)	1.79 m	0	0	(South Korea) Kangwon National University
9	RB	Moon Jin-hyeok	22 July 2005 (aged 19)	1.79 m	7	37	(South Korea) Wonkwang University
10	LB	Jeong U-jin	5 October 2005 (aged 19)	1.88 m	0	0	(South Korea) Chosun University
11	P	Kwak Min-hyuk	16 July 2005 (aged 19)	1.93 m	0	0	(South Korea) Kyung Hee University
12	GK	Kang Su-bin	1 March 2004 (aged 21)	1.82 m	7	0	(South Korea) Wonkwang University
13	CB	Kang Ryun-hyun	3 February 2004 (aged 21)	1.78 m	0	0	(South Korea) Chosun University
14	LB	Lee Do-hyun	20 September 2004 (aged 20)	1.84 m	0	0	(South Korea) Kangwon National University
17	P	Kim Hyeon-min	14 February 2004 (aged 21)	1.78 m	7	20	(South Korea) Kyung Hee University
19	LW	Choe Dong-hyeok	17 December 2004 (aged 20)	1.83 m	4	3	(South Korea) Kyung Hee University
23	LB	Lee Ho-hyun	10 November 2004 (aged 20)	1.87 m	7	9	(South Korea) Wonkwang University
25	RB	Park Beom-hwan	26 March 2005 (aged 20)	1.79 m	0	0	(South Korea) Namhan High School
31	CB	Choi Ji-hwan	24 February 2004 (aged 21)	1.83 m	7	31	(South Korea) Wonkwang University
39	CB	Kim Joung-ou	3 August 2004 (aged 20)	1.80 m	7	6	(South Korea) Chosun University
44	RB	Kim Dong-yeong	13 December 2004 (aged 20)	1.83 m	5	5	(South Korea) Kangwon National University
63	RB	Lee Min-jun	17 September 2004 (aged 20)	1.80 m	7	33	(South Korea) Kyung Hee University
88	GK	Park Ho-hyun	26 June 2005 (aged 19)	1.83 m	0	0	(South Korea) Kangwon National University
90	P	Park Seong-jun	28 August 2005 (aged 19)	1.85 m	7	4	(South Korea) Korea National Sport University
92	GK	Kim Hyeon-min	21 April 2004 (aged 21)	1.77 m	7	0	(South Korea) Kyung Hee University

=== Sweden ===
A 16-player squad was announced on 16 May 2025.

Head coach: Dennis Sandberg

No.	Pos.	Name	Date of birth (age)	Height	App.	Goals	Club
3	RW	Isak Borg	3 February 2004 (aged 21)	1.70 m	15	16	(Sweden) Eskilstuna Guif
6	LW	Noah Martinsson	22 April 2004 (aged 21)	1.80 m	17	24	(Sweden) Karlskrona
7	CB	Axel Månsson	10 May 2005 (aged 20)	1.75 m	32	106	(Sweden) Kristianstad
9	CB	Albin Hägglund Junler	20 March 2004 (aged 21)	1.80 m	33	49	(Sweden) Alingsås
10	CB	Sebastian Durlanu	24 May 2004 (aged 21)	1.80 m	12	25	(Sweden) Sävehof
14	RB	Elliot Eriksson	14 July 2005 (aged 19)	1.90 m	0	0	(Sweden) Helsingborg
15	RB	Isaac Biel Nilsen	19 January 2004 (aged 21)	1.86 m	17	38	(Sweden) Kristianstad
16	GK	Arvid Skoog	16 May 2005 (aged 20)	1.98 m	30	2	(Sweden) Hammarby
18	P	Marcus Björkman	6 January 2004 (aged 21)	1.97 m	35	86	(Sweden) Helsingborg
19	LW	Love Sundewall	21 February 2004 (aged 21)	1.91 m	35	100	(Sweden) Malmö
21	GK	Emil Holmberg Schatzl	17 November 2004 (aged 20)	1.91 m	23	1	(Sweden) Alingsås
22	P	Theodor Uliana Starck	19 June 2004 (aged 20)	1.97 m	32	77	(Norway) Elverum
23	LB	Pelle Segertoft	8 April 2004 (aged 21)	2.00 m	25	89	(Sweden) Önnereds
24	P	Emil Johannisson	1 June 2004 (aged 21)	1.92 m	12	9	(Sweden) Sävehof
27	LB	Oscar Johansson	10 April 2004 (aged 21)	1.95 m	17	83	(Sweden) Lågan Hörby
28	RB	Linus Gustavsson	5 February 2004 (aged 21)	1.77 m	23	100	(Sweden) Skövde

=== United States ===
A 17-player squad was announced on 10 June 2025.

Head coach: Danilo Rojevic

No.	Pos.	Name	Date of birth (age)	Height	App.	Goals	Club
1	GK	Grayson Wide	10 June 2004 (aged 21)	1.85 m	25	2	(Sweden) Upsala
2	RW	Matthew Spranda	22 July 2004 (aged 20)	1.85 m	10	45	(Argentina) San Fernando
3	RB	Tristan Morawski	12 March 2005 (aged 20)	2.02 m	25	31	(Poland) Pogoń Szczecin
4	CB	Benjamin Edwards	1 September 2006 (aged 18)	1.88 m	30	91	(Hungary) Veszprém
5	RW	Rodrigo Campos	7 October 2004 (aged 20)	1.90 m	20	53	(Spain) BM Cuatro Valles
6	CB	Oskar Trummer	4 September 2004 (aged 20)	1.82 m	10	35	(Germany) SV Anzing
7	P	Kahlil Liden	17 August 2005 (aged 19)	1.88 m	5	4	(United States) University of Pittsburgh
8	RB	Owen Rodgers	6 March 2005 (aged 20)	1.96 m	0	0	(United States) West Point Team
9	LB	Csaba Darvas	26 May 2005 (aged 20)	1.91 m	20	46	(Hungary) Tatabánya
10	LW	Jordan Fernandez	3 February 2005 (aged 20)	1.80 m	17	27	(France) Gonfreville
11	P	Maksim McCauley	9 April 2005 (aged 20)	1.91 m	35	58	(Sweden) Kristianstad
12	RB	Maximillian Olesen	8 January 2007 (aged 18)	1.95 m	15	18	(Denmark) København
13	P	Kaeden Kuhlmeyer	27 March 2006 (aged 19)	1.82 m	25	47	(Norway) HK–72 Sande
14	LB	Nepomuk Grabner	16 May 2005 (aged 20)	1.87 m	19	39	(Austria) Krems
15	LB	Martin Brunvold	6 January 2006 (aged 19)	1.86 m	22	79	(Norway) Fyllingen
16	GK	Benjamin Pedersen	15 March 2004 (aged 21)	2.02 m	16	1	(Hungary) Győr
17	LW	Jamie Merkel	14 October 2005 (aged 19)	1.80 m	5	2	(Switzerland) HC Ehrendingen
18	GK	Mattia Cercola	16 August 2005 (aged 19)	1.95 m	19	0	(Poland) AZS Uniwersytet Warszawski

== Group D ==
=== Algeria ===
A 18-player squad was announced on 11 June 2025.

Head coach: Lakhdar Arrouche

No.	Pos.	Name	Date of birth (age)	Height	App.	Goals	Club
3	RB	Atek Youcef	12 January 2005 (aged 20)	1.86 m	11	32	(Algeria) Mouloudia de Bordj Bou Arréridj
5	LB	Bendiab Ali	18 October 2004 (aged 20)	1.91 m	7	24	(Algeria) HBC El-Biar
6	LB	Rahmani Adberaouf	11 October 2004 (aged 20)	1.91 m	7	11	(Algeria) ES d'Aïn Touta
7	RB	Mohamed Cherif Zhoual	3 May 2005 (aged 20)	1.92 m	13	14	(Algeria) Olympique Annaba
12	RB	Yanis Berrehail	28 July 2005 (aged 19)	2.00 m	0	0	(France) US Créteil
21	RB	M'lik Soheib	27 December 2004 (aged 20)	1.90 m	0	0	(Algeria) MC Alger
23	P	Haioun Ahmed	27 April 2005 (aged 20)	1.78 m	13	16	(Algeria) Olympique Annaba
25	CB	Hamdaoui Salah	13 June 2005 (aged 20)	1.82 m	13	18	(Algeria) IRB Bouteldja
28	LW	Mohamed Faidi	13 December 2005 (aged 19)	1.82 m	0	0	(France) US Dreux Vernouillet
38	CB	Mohamed Chebli	16 June 2004 (aged 21)	1.82 m	0	0	(Algeria) MC Alger
52	GK	Salim Mezaza	26 January 2004 (aged 21)	1.96 m	2	0	(Spain) Ciudad de Logroño
69	CB	Adri Zakaria	1 April 2004 (aged 21)	1.82 m	13	33	(Algeria) CS Bir Mourad Rais
71	P	Guemeida Adel	26 June 2004 (aged 20)	1.95 m	0	0	(France) JS Cherbourg Manche
73	GK	Benslimane Rayane	3 August 2005 (aged 19)	1.96 m	7	0	(Algeria) Olympique Annaba
76	GK	Achiche Sid Ali	28 August 2004 (aged 20)	1.91 m	13	2	(Algeria) HBC El-Biar
87	LW	Ouahab Abdel Ghani	13 May 2004 (aged 21)	1.75 m	0	0	(Algeria) CS Bir Mourad Rais
89	CB	Saidi Nazim	28 January 2004 (aged 21)	1.72 m	6	12	(Algeria) CS Bir Mourad Rais
94	RB	Abdelmounaim Mediouni	18 June 2004 (aged 21)	1.89 m	0	0	(France) AS Monaco

=== Canada ===
A 16-player squad was announced on 14 June 2025.

Head coach: Frantz Champagne

No.	Pos.	Name	Date of birth (age)	Height	App.	Goals	Club
1	GK	Santiago Echegaray	13 December 2006 (aged 18)	1.90 m	0	0	(Canada) Edmonton
3	CB	Mateo Barboza Gonzalez	19 April 2007 (aged 18)	1.76 m	0	0	(Canada) Champlain
4	CB	Rhys Kleinmann	1 December 2004 (aged 20)	1.84 m	0	0	(Canada) Avengers
6	LB	Charles Houle	28 December 2006 (aged 18)	1.80 m	0	0	(Canada) Lévis
7	LW	Nicolas Chassé	21 September 2004 (aged 20)	1.75 m	0	0	(Canada) Champlain
8	RB	Simon Lefebvre-Gagnon	10 March 2004 (aged 21)	1.85 m	0	0	(France) Objat Corrèze
9	P	Fabio Matteo	14 July 2006 (aged 18)	1.82 m	0	0	(Canada) Celtique de Montréal
10	RW	Joaquin Lavoie	29 February 2004 (aged 21)	1.82 m	0	0	(Canada) Lévis
11	RB	Thibaut Coin	15 October 2006 (aged 18)	1.84 m	0	0	(Canada) Celtique de Montréal
13	RB	Antony Savard	19 September 2006 (aged 18)	1.93 m	0	0	(Canada) Lévis
15	RB	Antoine Desbiens	7 February 2005 (aged 20)	1.89 m	0	0	(Canada) Champlain
17	LB	Colton Kuypers	6 April 2004 (aged 21)	1.97 m	0	0	(Denmark) Vendsyssel
22	CB	Alfred Danielsson	6 July 2006 (aged 18)	1.90 m	0	0	(Sweden) Karlskrona
24	P	Zachary Cadoret	26 September 2006 (aged 18)	1.93 m	0	0	(Canada) Lévis
77	RB	Matthew Coghill	23 June 2005 (aged 19)	1.77 m	0	0	(Canada) Edmonton
92	GK	Nael Bisou	26 April 2005 (aged 20)	1.93 m	0	0	(Canada) Lévis

=== Croatia ===
A 20-player squad was announced on 9 June 2025.

Head coach: Boris Dvoršek

No.	Pos.	Name	Date of birth (age)	Height	App.	Goals	Club
1	GK	Tin Herceg	2 April 2004 (aged 21)	1.94 m	48	1	(Slovenia) Trimo Trebnje
2	LW	Marko Bajan	28 July 2004 (aged 20)	1.81 m	55	90	(Croatia) Poreč
4	LW	Jakov Celegin	12 July 2005 (aged 19)	1.79 m	4	11	(Croatia) RK Zagreb
5	LW	Maksimilijan Molc	3 February 2004 (aged 21)	1.95 m	50	105	(Croatia) RK Zagreb
7	RW	Toni Živković	24 June 2004 (aged 20)	1.80 m	7	16	(Croatia) Metalac Zagreb
11	P	Luka Malinarich	25 November 2004 (aged 20)	1.96 m	50	103	(Croatia) Poreč
12	GK	Nikola Kahlina	5 August 2004 (aged 20)	2.02 m	44	0	(Croatia) Sesvete
13	P	Tin Vrbanec	19 January 2004 (aged 21)	1.86 m	11	19	(Croatia) Varaždin
14	P	Franko Krstić	13 March 2004 (aged 21)	1.95 m	27	57	(Croatia) Zamet
16	GK	Marko Prpić	23 January 2004 (aged 21)	1.98 m	30	0	(Croatia) Rudar Rude
18	LB	Aleksandar Čaprić	17 March 2004 (aged 21)	1.91 m	51	154	(Germany) Eisenach
19	LB	Diano Ćeško	17 April 2004 (aged 21)	1.96 m	0	0	(Bosnia and Herzegovina) Izviđač
20	LB	Jura Egon Juranić	1 January 2004 (aged 21)	1.87 m	17	33	(Austria) Ferlach
24	CB	Nikola Ivanković	5 November 2004 (aged 20)	1.87 m	44	123	(Croatia) Poreč
25	CB	Tian Borovec	5 June 2004 (aged 21)	1.90 m	47	85	(Croatia) Varaždin
27	CB	Tin Baković	27 January 2004 (aged 21)	1.82 m	2	8	(Croatia) Čakovec
30	RB	Petar Krupić	9 August 2004 (aged 20)	1.87 m	41	74	(Croatia) Nexe Našice
33	LB	Teo Popović	6 December 2004 (aged 20)	1.99 m	0	0	(Croatia) Poreč

=== Portugal ===
A 16-player squad was announced on 4 June 2025.

Head coach: Carlos Martingo

No.	Pos.	Name	Date of birth (age)	Height	App.	Goals	Club
4	CB	Filipe Monteiro	26 April 2004 (aged 21)	1.82 m	47	121	(Portugal) ABC Braga
5	LB	Gabriel Cavalcanti	30 May 2004 (aged 21)	1.97 m	42	101	(Portugal) Benfica
7	RB	Tomás Teixeira	12 April 2005 (aged 20)	1.90 m	68	191	(Portugal) Póvoa AC
10	RW	José Ferreira	24 June 2005 (aged 19)	1.85 m	66	196	(Portugal) Porto
11	LW	João Magalhães	12 September 2006 (aged 18)	1.95 m	70	159	(Portugal) Porto
13	RB	Rafael Vasconcelos	15 June 2007 (aged 18)	1.81 m	74	226	(Portugal) Sporting
15	P	Eduardo Costa	29 April 2005 (aged 20)	1.98 m	25	7	(Portugal) Porto
22	CB	Gabriel Conceição	15 November 2004 (aged 20)	1.84 m	26	61	(Portugal) Águas Santas
23	LB	João Lourenço	10 May 2006 (aged 19)	1.96 m	64	277	(Spain) Benidorm
24	RW	Afonso Mendes	11 January 2005 (aged 20)	1.84 m	32	63	(Portugal) SC Horta
27	RB	Francisco Coelho	11 March 2004 (aged 21)	1.95 m	21	12	(Portugal) Avanca Bioria Bondalti
28	GK	Gonçalo Morgado	20 April 2004 (aged 21)	1.96 m	47	4	(Portugal) Póvoa AC
30	P	Ricardo Brandão	28 April 2004 (aged 21)	2.00 m	84	212	(Portugal) Porto
32	LW	Diogo Campos	7 July 2004 (aged 20)	1.83 m	13	3	(Portugal) Nazaré Dom Fuas AC
33	GK	Diogo Marques	17 March 2004 (aged 21)	1.90 m	91	8	(Portugal) Porto
34	CB	Xavier Barbosa	2 November 2004 (aged 20)	1.84 m	40	48	(Portugal) Avanca Bioria Bondalti

== Group E ==
=== Denmark ===
A 16-player squad was announced on 22 May 2025.

Head coach: Ulrik Kirkely

No.	Pos.	Name	Date of birth (age)	Height	App.	Goals	Club
3	P	Tobias Schmidt	14 July 2005 (aged 19)	1.95 m	47	58	(Denmark) SønderjyskE
5	LB	Tobias Tombak	10 February 2004 (aged 21)	1.98 m	34	63	(Denmark) Ringsted
6	RB	Nikolaj Risbjerg Larsson	30 January 2004 (aged 21)	1.86 m	21	67	(Denmark) Nordsjælland
10	CB	Frederik Pedersen	25 August 2005 (aged 19)	1.84 m	33	182	(Denmark) GOG
12	GK	Malte Johnsson Eichhorst	21 April 2004 (aged 21)	1.97 m	31	6	(Denmark) Ringsted
16	GK	Frederik Møller Wolff	25 April 2006 (aged 19)	1.96 m	19	1	(Denmark) GOG
17	RW	Magnus Storgaard Pedersen	7 December 2004 (aged 20)	1.84 m	8	19	(Denmark) Skive
19	RB	Kristoffer Vestergaard	3 April 2004 (aged 21)	1.93 m	33	94	(Denmark) Mors-Thy
22	LW	Mathias Kragh Pedersen	27 January 2004 (aged 21)	1.96 m	33	74	(Denmark) Nordsjælland
24	CB	Simon Skovhus Jensen	23 May 2004 (aged 21)	1.88 m	25	69	(Denmark) Århus
25	P	Morten Kaalund Dahlgaard	18 May 2004 (aged 21)	1.91 m	30	66	(Denmark) Skanderborg
28	LB	Magnus Rahbek Sand	16 July 2004 (aged 20)	1.95 m	25	57	(Denmark) Bjerringbro-Silkeborg
29	RW	Andreas Aagreen Johansen	19 April 2004 (aged 21)	1.91 m	28	33	(Denmark) Skanderborg
31	CB	Anton Houe	19 July 2005 (aged 19)	1.84 m	5	13	(Denmark) Mors-Thy
33	P	Jonas Dehn Nielsen	6 September 2005 (aged 19)	1.97 m	6	6	(Denmark) Mors-Thy
34	LW	Frederik Jægerum	6 February 2004 (aged 21)	1.87 m	21	40	(Denmark) Fredericia

=== France ===
A 18-player squad was announced on 16 June 2025.

Head coach: Guillaume Joli

No.	Pos.	Name	Date of birth (age)	Height	App.	Goals	Club
1	GK	Stanis Soullier	20 February 2004 (aged 21)	1.97 m	33	4	(France) Paris Saint-Germain
2	RW	Rémi Peyre	30 January 2004 (aged 21)	1.72 m	36	74	(France) Nîmes Gard
5	RB	Tristan Michel	16 June 2004 (aged 21)	1.94 m	10	20	(France) Cesson Rennes
7	RB	Henri Kirtz	27 May 2004 (aged 21)	1.98 m	42	85	(France) Ivry
8	CB	Michal Baran	21 December 2004 (aged 20)	1.94 m	38	93	(France) Cesson Rennes
10	CB	Reyhan Zuzo	26 June 2005 (aged 19)	1.90 m	48	167	(France) Caen
11	RB	Paul Gourdel	14 April 2004 (aged 21)	1.87 m	11	21	(France) Pays d'Aix Université
12	GK	Noé Rataboul	17 July 2005 (aged 19)	1.92 m	1	0	(France) Saint-Raphaël Var
16	GK	Romann Carle	13 June 2005 (aged 20)	1.93 m	4	1	(France) Sélestat Alsace
18	LB	Dimitri Claude	29 August 2005 (aged 19)	1.94 m	2	2	(France) Chambéry Savoie
24	LB	Noa Narcisse	25 January 2004 (aged 21)	1.91 m	6	11	(France) Paris Saint-Germain
28	LW	Pierre-Alexis Favril	15 October 2004 (aged 20)	1.87 m	41	208	(France) Nantes
48	P	Antoine Baladi	18 January 2004 (aged 21)	1.88 m	8	5	(France) Ivry
88	CB	Eliot Desblancs	18 August 2004 (aged 20)	1.85 m	29	71	(France) Pays d'Aix Université
92	LW	Naël Tighiouart	13 March 2004 (aged 21)	1.86 m	20	99	(France) C' Chartres Métropole
95	P	André Wenkegheu Tchambou Mouko	10 May 2004 (aged 21)	1.97 m	13	14	(France) Nantes
98	P	Amara Karamoko	5 July 2005 (aged 19)	1.92 m	19	56	(France) Paris Saint-Germain
99	P	Mouhamadou Sidibé	9 October 2004 (aged 20)	2.00 m	27	4	(France) Pays d'Aix Université

=== Mexico ===
Head coach: Ángel Rojas

No.	Pos.	Name	Date of birth (age)	Height	App.	Goals	Club
2	CB	Ian Martínez	2 September 2005 (aged 19)	1.78 m	0	0	(Mexico) Colima
3	LW	Leonardo Ayala	23 August 2004 (aged 20)	1.82 m	0	0	No club
4	RB	Juan Maya	12 August 2005 (aged 19)	1.90 m	0	0	(Spain) Guadalajara
5	P	Enric Carreño	8 February 2005 (aged 20)	1.90 m	0	0	(Spain) Barcelona
7	LB	Bryan Maltos	10 February 2005 (aged 20)	1.94 m	0	0	(Mexico) Chihuahua
8	LB	José Flores	20 May 2004 (aged 21)	1.84 m	0	0	(Mexico) Sonora
9	LW	Sebastián Sandoval	16 August 2005 (aged 19)	1.88 m	0	0	(Mexico) Nuevo León
10	LB	David Gloria	20 February 2006 (aged 19)	1.90 m	10	43	(Mexico) Nuevo León
11	P	Héctor Campos	24 October 2006 (aged 18)	2.05 m	0	0	(Mexico) Tamaulipas
15	CB	Diego Rey	15 May 2007 (aged 18)	1.82 m	0	0	(Mexico) Handball Estado de México
16	GK	David Fajardo	1 April 2004 (aged 21)	1.83 m	7	0	(Mexico) Vikingos de Sonora
17	GK	Santiago Román	17 April 2007 (aged 18)	1.82 m	0	0	(Mexico) Edomex
18	LB	Osvaldo Maya	18 November 2006 (aged 18)	1.92 m	0	0	(Mexico) Querétaro
21	LB	Manuel Rivas	15 September 2004 (aged 20)	1.89 m	0	0	(Mexico) Colima
24	GK	Víctor Salgado	28 September 2004 (aged 20)	1.80 m	0	0	(Mexico) Baja
28	RB	Juan Anguiano	5 September 2005 (aged 19)	1.84 m	7	33	No club

=== Morocco ===
Head coach: Karim Bouhaddioui

No.	Pos.	Name	Date of birth (age)	Height	App.	Goals	Club
1	GK	Oussama Hakaoui	25 June 2005 (aged 19)	1.91 m	7	9	(Morocco) US Nouacer
3	LB	Adam Faddal	14 October 2004 (aged 20)	1.88 m	7	16	(Morocco) MC d'Oujda
5	RW	Moubarak Messaoudi	12 August 2005 (aged 19)	1.82 m	4	6	(Morocco) US Nouacer
6	CB	Mohamed Nazi	5 August 2005 (aged 19)	1.84 m	7	9	(Morocco) Taraji Ouazzane
10	CB	Hamza Ouafik	7 August 2005 (aged 19)	1.82 m	19	25	(Morocco) Mountada Derb Sultan
12	GK	Akram Jbari	23 May 2004 (aged 21)	1.75 m	7	0	(Morocco) Majd Chabab Souk Sebt
14	P	Abderrahim Ihiri	25 March 2005 (aged 20)	1.70 m	7	2	(Morocco) Widad Smara
19	LB	Abdellah Razgui	4 September 2004 (aged 20)	1.85 m	19	64	(Morocco) Widad Smara
20	P	Omar El-Khalifi	14 November 2004 (aged 20)	1.81 m	10	6	(Morocco) Raja d'Agadir
21	P	Mohamed Bouydarne	1 January 2005 (aged 20)	2.05 m	10	4	(France) US Créteil
22	CB	Youness Mansari	15 February 2004 (aged 21)	1.98 m	6	8	Tremblay-en-France
24	RB	Noam El-Ouadrhiri	14 April 2004 (aged 21)	1.70 m	6	28	(France) Villeneuve d'Ascq
33	GK	Mohamed Lakrim	15 June 2007 (aged 18)	1.86 m	10	1	(Morocco) Raja d'Agadir
66	LW	Ilyasse Ouahib	7 March 2004 (aged 21)	1.75 m	7	35	(Morocco) US Nouacer
71	RB	Amjad Saa	23 July 2005 (aged 19)	1.65 m	7	8	(Morocco) Montada El-Fida
98	LB	Lhoucine Ouhmou	4 August 2005 (aged 19)	1.79 m	5	9	(France) AS St. Brice Courcelles

== Group F ==
=== Faroe Islands ===
A 16-player squad was announced on 4 June 2025.

Head coach: Hjalti Mohr Jacobsen

No.	Pos.	Name	Date of birth (age)	Height	App.	Goals	Club
1	GK	Torstein Sivertsen	27 November 2004 (aged 20)	1.80 m	15	0	(Faroe Islands) H71
2	LB	Tróndur Johnsson	27 July 2004 (aged 20)	1.85 m	23	20	(Faroe Islands) VÍF
4	LW	Sofus í Selvindi	30 December 2004 (aged 20)	1.94 m	8	6	(Faroe Islands) StÍF
5	LW	Rói Hjaltason	12 August 2005 (aged 19)	1.85 m	23	17	(Faroe Islands) H71
10	RW	Óla Gaard Olsen	20 December 2004 (aged 20)	1.79 m	23	47	(Faroe Islands) VÍF
13	P	Eyðbjørn Danielsen	19 January 2004 (aged 21)	1.87 m	0	0	(Faroe Islands) VÍF
21	LB	Búi Poulsen	19 May 2004 (aged 21)	1.95 m	23	35	(Denmark) Grindsted
22	GK	Aleksandar Lacok	15 February 2004 (aged 21)	1.90 m	57	3	(Switzerland) TSV St. Otmar St. Gallen
32	P	Tóki Fríðriksson	24 February 2005 (aged 20)	1.97 m	16	12	(Faroe Islands) KÍF
38	CB	Høgni Heinason	9 November 2005 (aged 19)	1.87 m	15	25	(Faroe Islands) H71
39	LB	Rókur Ziskason	25 April 2004 (aged 21)	1.92 m	23	43	(Faroe Islands) H71
44	RW	Niklas Gaard	21 September 2005 (aged 19)	1.85 m	23	64	(Faroe Islands) Kyndil
45	CB	Trúgvi Hávardsson	20 May 2005 (aged 20)	1.80 m	25	45	(Faroe Islands) StÍF
47	P	Ísak Vedelsbøl	18 October 2004 (aged 20)	1.96 m	40	143	(Sweden) Sävehof
76	LB	Høgni Højsted	3 February 2004 (aged 21)	1.86 m	23	9	(Faroe Islands) H71
78	LB	Óli Mittún	10 June 2005 (aged 20)	1.86 m	58	373	(Denmark) GOG

=== Iceland ===
A 16-player squad was announced on 21 May 2025.

Head coach: Einar Einarsson

No.	Pos.	Name	Date of birth (age)	Height	App.	Goals	Club
3	LW	Sigurður Sigurjónsson	9 March 2004 (aged 21)	1.80 m	22	34	(Iceland) Haukar
5	CB	Hans Ólafsson	17 February 2004 (aged 21)	1.89 m	30	19	(Iceland) Stjarnan
6	P	Sigurður Matthíasson	26 February 2005 (aged 20)	1.91 m	2	3	(Iceland) Víkingur
8	RW	Andri Elísson	20 May 2004 (aged 21)	1.81 m	38	72	(Iceland) Haukar
9	LB	Haukur Hauksson	11 February 2004 (aged 21)	1.91 m	19	18	(Iceland) HK
10	CB	Elmar Erlingsson	16 May 2004 (aged 21)	1.80 m	43	204	(Germany) Nordhorn-Lingen
11	RB	Birkir Steinsson	6 October 2005 (aged 19)	1.94 m	43	64	(Iceland) Haukar
12	GK	Ísak Steinsson	1 May 2005 (aged 20)	1.94 m	38	0	(Norway) Drammen
13	RW	Eiður Valsson	16 September 2005 (aged 19)	1.78 m	33	107	(Iceland) Fram
14	CB	Össur Haraldsson	26 April 2004 (aged 21)	1.86 m	43	139	(Iceland) Haukar
16	GK	Breki Árnason	21 July 2004 (aged 20)	1.98 m	41	0	(Iceland) Fram
17	LB	Skarphéðinn Einarsson	25 August 2005 (aged 19)	1.93 m	43	114	(Iceland) Haukar
18	P	Þorvaldur Þorvaldsson	30 March 2004 (aged 21)	1.99 m	33	48	(Iceland) Valur
19	P	Hinrik Heiðarsson	28 September 2004 (aged 20)	1.90 m	40	69	(Iceland) Haukar
22	LB	Ívar Viðarsson	16 September 2005 (aged 19)	1.95 m	28	30	(Iceland) ÍBV
32	LB	Bjarki Jóhannsson	13 November 2005 (aged 19)	1.90 m	5	7	(Denmark) Aalborg

=== North Macedonia ===
A 20-player squad was announced on 26 May 2025.

Head coach: Radoslav Stojanović

No.	Pos.	Name	Date of birth (age)	Height	App.	Goals	Club
1	GK	David Brestovac	11 March 2004 (aged 21)	1.81 m	0	0	(North Macedonia) Eurofarm Pelister
2	LW	Mario Stojanovski	8 September 2004 (aged 20)	1.83 m	0	0	(North Macedonia) Vardar
3	LW	Damjan Subaševski	21 January 2005 (aged 20)	1.80 m	0	0	(North Macedonia) Butel Skopje
4	P	Dejan Mihajlović	17 June 2005 (aged 20)	1.87 m	0	0	(North Macedonia) Butel Skopje
7	RB	Dimitar Uzunčev	8 November 2005 (aged 19)	1.80 m	0	0	(North Macedonia) Butel Skopje
9	P	Andrej Gligorov	22 July 2004 (aged 20)	1.93 m	0	0	(North Macedonia) Prolet
10	RW	Nenad Belistojanovski	24 September 2004 (aged 20)	1.77 m	0	0	(North Macedonia) Eurofarm Pelister 2
12	GK	Ivan Galevski	5 July 2004 (aged 20)	2.00 m	0	0	(North Macedonia) Alkaloid
13	CB	Slavčo Šuleski	22 August 2004 (aged 20)	1.82 m	0	0	(North Macedonia) Tikveš
18	LB	Todor Uzunčev	9 October 2004 (aged 20)	1.85 m	0	0	(North Macedonia) Butel Skopje
19	RW	Jovan Danevski	7 July 2004 (aged 20)	1.83 m	0	0	(North Macedonia) Tikveš
20	CB	Tomislav Dimkovski	1 July 2004 (aged 20)	1.84 m	0	0	(North Macedonia) Prolet
21	RW	Aleksandar Petkovski	24 May 2004 (aged 21)	1.87 m	0	0	(North Macedonia) Alkaloid
25	P	Valentin Karasmanakis	14 January 2005 (aged 20)	1.95 m	0	0	(North Macedonia) Alkaloid
30	LB	David Dimevski	21 June 2004 (aged 20)	1.87 m	0	0	(North Macedonia) Kumanovo
31	LB	Andrej Stojanovski	21 August 2004 (aged 20)	1.87 m	0	0	(North Macedonia) Prolet
44	CB	Mirče Kalajđieski	9 March 2004 (aged 21)	1.81 m	0	0	(North Macedonia) Eurofarm Pelister 2
93	LB	Borjan Damjanoski	10 November 2004 (aged 20)	1.88 m	0	0	(Austria) Graz

=== Romania ===
Head coach: Adrian Petrea

No.	Pos.	Name	Date of birth (age)	Height	App.	Goals	Club
1	GK	Nikolas Vișan	22 July 2005 (aged 19)	1.91 m	5	0	(Romania) Focșani
3	P	Bogdan Oancea	3 March 2005 (aged 20)	1.97 m	26	45	(Romania) CSM București
6	CB	Andrei Călinescu	10 February 2004 (aged 21)	1.92 m	0	0	(Romania) Sighișoara
7	LB	Bogdan-David Voica	14 April 2004 (aged 21)	1.94 m	32	41	(Romania) CSM București
9	RW	Sorin-Paul Grigore	2 February 2004 (aged 21)	1.93 m	35	42	(Romania) Suceava
10	CB	Mario Racolța	20 January 2005 (aged 20)	1.80 m	10	14	(Romania) Minaur Baia Mare
11	CB	Bogdan Niculaie	27 June 2005 (aged 19)	1.92 m	14	17	(Romania) Suceava
12	GK	Florin Sîrghie	2 April 2004 (aged 21)	1.90 m	7	0	(Romania) Bacău
14	LW	Andy-Ștefan Armanu	2 July 2004 (aged 20)	1.85 m	21	23	(Romania) Vaslui
16	GK	Dragoș Podovei	5 March 2004 (aged 21)	1.91 m	23	3	(Romania) Suceava
19	RW	David Pavlov	25 March 2004 (aged 21)	1.78 m	23	32	(Romania) Focșani
20	CB	Kadir Murtaza	31 October 2005 (aged 19)	1.87 m	12	10	(Romania) Steaua București
26	P	Ionuț Cocoșilă	31 December 2005 (aged 19)	2.03 m	1	0	(Romania) Politehnica Timișoara
33	RB	Codrin-George Radu	5 May 2005 (aged 20)	1.92 m	31	48	(Romania) Suceava
40	LB	Iulian Suciu	12 January 2005 (aged 20)	1.93 m	3	1	(Romania) Dinamo București
44	CB	Daniel Stanciuc	7 March 2004 (aged 21)	1.96 m	26	84	(Romania) Dinamo București
78	P	Alexandru Focșăneanu	24 January 2004 (aged 21)	2.05 m	21	19	(Romania) Suceava
99	LB	Codrin Dascălu	16 July 2006 (aged 18)	1.98 m	23	45	(Romania) Suceava

== Group G ==
=== Germany ===
A 16-player squad was announced on 30 May 2025.

Head coach: Martin Heuberger

No.	Pos.	Name	Date of birth (age)	Height	App.	Goals	Club
1	GK	Julian Buchele	30 April 2004 (aged 21)	1.91 m	26	1	(Germany) TV Großwallstadt
2	LW	David Móré	13 June 2004 (aged 21)	1.85 m	25	86	(Germany) Rhein-Neckar Löwen
3	CB	Elias Newel	13 July 2004 (aged 20)	1.83 m	23	51	(Germany) Frisch Auf Göppingen
4	LW	Florian Drosten	18 June 2004 (aged 21)	1.87 m	0	0	(Germany) MT Melsungen
5	LB	Felix Göttler	11 July 2005 (aged 19)	1.92 m	7	25	(Germany) TUSEM Essen
7	CB	Fritz Haake	29 July 2004 (aged 20)	1.84 m	23	44	(Germany) Dessau-Roßlauer
8	RW	Tim Gömmel	24 March 2005 (aged 20)	1.95 m	25	50	(Germany) HC Erlangen
10	CB	Linus Kutz	28 February 2005 (aged 20)	1.87 m	9	7	(Germany) THW Kiel
11	RB	Henri Pabst	9 February 2004 (aged 21)	1.90 m	26	50	(Germany) THW Kiel
12	GK	Frederik Höler	26 January 2004 (aged 21)	1.89 m	27	0	(Germany) VfL Potsdam
14	RB	Anton Preußner	13 January 2005 (aged 20)	1.93 m	23	31	(Germany) Füchse Berlin
15	RW	Max Günter	28 August 2004 (aged 20)	1.82 m	5	18	(Germany) VfL Potsdam
17	P	Jan Schmidt	17 March 2005 (aged 20)	1.97 m	25	85	(Germany) Bayer Dormagen
19	P	Georg Löwen	8 June 2004 (aged 21)	1.95 m	5	1	(Germany) HSG Wetzlar
20	LB	Leif Haack	22 June 2005 (aged 19)	1.95 m	10	14	(Germany) TV Hüttenberg
22	P	Florian Scheerer	27 January 2004 (aged 21)	1.95 m	12	16	(Germany) HC Erlangen

=== Serbia ===
A 20-player squad was announced on 28 May 2025.

Head coach: Dalibor Čutura

No.	Pos.	Name	Date of birth (age)	Height	App.	Goals	Club
2	P	Mladenko Draško	29 June 2005 (aged 19)	1.89 m	11	6	(Serbia) Proleter
4	LB	Nikola Bekić	13 August 2004 (aged 20)	1.90 m	6	11	(Serbia) Metaloplastika
7	RW	Luka Lazić	31 October 2005 (aged 19)	1.90 m	26	47	(Serbia) Rudar Kostolac
8	CB	Radan Kovačević	11 August 2005 (aged 19)	1.87 m	9	7	(Serbia) Partizan
10	LW	Filip Milovanović	20 June 2004 (aged 20)	1.85 m	31	84	(Serbia) Metaloplastika
13	RB	Uroš Mitrović	13 September 2004 (aged 20)	2.00 m	27	44	(France) Fenix Toulouse
14	CB	Vukašin Antonijević	10 March 2004 (aged 21)	1.90 m	28	74	(Slovenia) Celje
16	GK	Nikola Zorić	30 September 2004 (aged 20)	2.00 m	21	2	(Serbia) Partizan
18	P	Luka Šević	7 October 2004 (aged 20)	1.94 m	5	12	(Bosnia and Herzegovina) Izviđač
19	RB	Strahinja Ilić	19 April 2005 (aged 20)	2.06 m	4	9	(Serbia) Dinamo Pančevo
22	P	Luka Panić	5 November 2005 (aged 19)	1.90 m	9	8	(Serbia) Kikinda Grindex
24	LB	Vojin Čabrilo	24 August 2004 (aged 20)	1.97 m	24	43	(France) Fenix Toulouse
25	LB	Simo Šijan	31 August 2004 (aged 20)	1.86 m	38	104	(Denmark) Skjern
27	LW	Đorđe Rančić	14 September 2004 (aged 20)	1.86 m	4	9	(Serbia) Dinamo Pančevo
71	RW	Milija Papović	24 February 2005 (aged 20)	1.89 m	31	68	(Serbia) Metaloplastika
77	CB	Leo Feješ	25 November 2004 (aged 20)	1.77 m	22	40	(Serbia) Crvenka
91	GK	Marko Draško	21 March 2004 (aged 21)	1.91 m	19	2	(Serbia) Vojvodina
98	GK	Kosta Dizdar	28 October 2004 (aged 20)	2.01 m	2	0	(Serbia) Jugović

=== Switzerland ===
Head coach: (Czech Republic) Petr Hrachovec

No.	Pos.	Name	Date of birth (age)	Height	App.	Goals	Club
2	P	Mischa Romer	11 January 2004 (aged 21)	1.91 m	17	16	(Switzerland) Pfadi Winterthur
3	LW	Nikos Sarlos	27 January 2005 (aged 20)	1.79 m	17	81	(Switzerland) Suhr Aarau
5	CB	Tiago Cuencas	29 December 2007 (aged 17)	1.85 m	27	86	(Switzerland) Pfadi Winterthur
8	CB	Luca Sigrist	4 October 2005 (aged 19)	1.87 m	12	63	(Switzerland) Kriens-Luzern
9	LB	Valentin Wolfisberg	7 December 2004 (aged 20)	1.96 m	17	82	(Switzerland) Kriens-Luzern
10	LB	Levin Wanner	25 February 2004 (aged 21)	1.94 m	13	35	(Switzerland) Pfadi Winterthur
11	RB	Leo Schnyder	8 July 2005 (aged 19)	1.80 m	17	38	(Switzerland) BSV Bern
12	GK	André Strauss	1 November 2005 (aged 19)	1.91 m	0	0	(Switzerland) Kadetten Schaffhausen
14	RW	Gino Steenaerts	5 May 2005 (aged 20)	1.84 m	11	67	(Switzerland) Kriens-Luzern
16	GK	Mathieu Seravalli	15 September 2004 (aged 20)	1.90 m	15	2	(Switzerland) BSV Bern
17	LB	Manoy Ugiagbe	10 January 2006 (aged 19)	1.92 m	24	131	(Switzerland) Kadetten Schaffhausen
19	RB	Devin Lang	16 September 2004 (aged 20)	1.84 m	12	8	(Switzerland) BSV Stans
21	LW	Tazio Baumann	24 April 2004 (aged 21)	1.83 m	15	41	(Switzerland) Pfadi Winterthur
25	CB	Leandro Römer	4 July 2004 (aged 20)	1.90 m	0	0	(Switzerland) Wacker Thun
49	RW	Rino Hochuli	4 June 2006 (aged 19)	1.80 m	22	46	(Switzerland) SG Pilatus
55	P	Nils Flückiger	15 October 2005 (aged 19)	1.88 m	0	0	(Switzerland) Kriens-Luzern

=== Tunisia ===
A 18-player squad was announced on 14 June 2025.

Head coach: Brahim Laugh

No.	Pos.	Name	Date of birth (age)	Height	App.	Goals	Club
1	GK	Ahmed Ben Nasr	11 April 2006 (aged 19)	1.92 m	16	2	(Tunisia) AS d'Hammamet
2	LW	Mohamed Amine Naffeti	15 October 2004 (aged 20)	1.93 m	0	0	(Tunisia) JS Chihia
3	P	Mustapha Jmour	22 November 2006 (aged 18)	1.80 m	19	75	(Tunisia) SC Moknine
6	P	Ahmed Daldoul	20 November 2004 (aged 20)	1.85 m	11	20	(Tunisia) El Makarem de Mahdia
8	CB	Mohamed Ben Abdennebi	1 October 2005 (aged 19)	1.92 m	0	0	(France) Lille
10	RB	Iskander Jafali	3 August 2004 (aged 20)	1.93 m	26	112	(Tunisia) ES de Tunis
15	RB	Mabrouk Ben Othman	12 January 2004 (aged 21)	1.86 m	1	1	(Tunisia) CS de Sakiet Ezzit
16	GK	Thamer Touzi	15 March 2005 (aged 20)	2.00 m	1	0	(Tunisia) Ksour Essef
20	LB	Ahmed Ben Rhouma	10 September 2004 (aged 20)	1.90 m	8	17	(Tunisia) ÉS du Sahel
21	LW	Mohamed Cherif	12 March 2005 (aged 20)	1.82 m	17	28	(Tunisia) ES de Tunis
25	RW	Khalil Barboura	14 January 2004 (aged 21)	1.85 m	12	35	(Tunisia) El Makarem de Mahdia
33	GK	Mohamed Ben Hassine	18 August 2004 (aged 20)	1.94 m	19	9	(Tunisia) El Makarem de Mahdia
39	LB	Koussay Ben Fraj	2 September 2004 (aged 20)	1.92 m	30	67	(France) Chartres
66	RW	Najib Hadded	2 November 2004 (aged 20)	1.80 m	11	16	(Tunisia) El Baath Sportif de Béni Khiar
71	CB	Iheb Fathallah	7 June 2004 (aged 21)	1.82 m	10	19	(Tunisia) El Makarem de Mahdia
94	P	Mohamed Ataoui	20 July 2005 (aged 19)	1.96 m	5	3	(Tunisia) ÉS du Sahel
98	CB	Slim Brahem	14 April 2005 (aged 20)	1.88 m	6	19	(Tunisia) ÉS du Sahel
99	RB	Alaeddine Sahel	18 December 2004 (aged 20)	1.93 m	17	38	(Tunisia) ÉS du Sahel

== Group H ==
=== Bahrain ===
A 16-player squad was announced on 12 June 2025.

Head coach: Sayed Al-Falahi

No.	Pos.	Name	Date of birth (age)	Height	App.	Goals	Club
3	RB	Abdulla Shuaib	1 December 2005 (aged 19)	1.73 m	10	10	(Bahrain) Barbar
6	CB	Sayed Al-Muhafdha	24 December 2005 (aged 19)	1.76 m	12	12	(Bahrain) Barbar
10	CB	Abdulla Mohamed	15 June 2004 (aged 21)	1.74 m	13	39	(Bahrain) Barbar
11	LB	Ali Kadhem	17 July 2005 (aged 19)	1.92 m	8	5	(Bahrain) Al-Shabab
13	RW	Salman Al-Showaikh	9 January 2006 (aged 19)	1.69 m	25	30	(Bahrain) Barbar
14	LB	Mahmood Yusuf	17 March 2006 (aged 19)	1.82 m	12	15	(Bahrain) Barbar
17	P	Sayed Al-Falahi	16 March 2004 (aged 21)	1.80 m	5	0	(Bahrain) Tobli
19	LB	Mohamed Aadam	9 December 2007 (aged 17)	1.79 m	10	15	(Bahrain) Al-Ettifaq
22	GK	Mohamed Shamlooh	16 June 2006 (aged 19)	1.82 m	0	0	(Bahrain) Tobli
72	LB	Elias Ali	26 June 2004 (aged 20)	1.78 m	10	5	(Bahrain) Al-Ettifaq
77	RB	Ahmed Fardan	25 May 2005 (aged 20)	1.81 m	12	20	(Bahrain) Al-Tadhamon
78	CB	Abbas Ali	27 December 2006 (aged 18)	1.78 m	10	5	(Bahrain) Samaheej
87	GK	Ali Al-Madani	27 October 2004 (aged 20)	1.84 m	11	2	(Bahrain) Al-Ettifaq
89	P	Sayed Al-Falahi	16 March 2004 (aged 21)	1.84 m	12	17	(Bahrain) Tobli
97	P	Husain Hasan	3 September 2004 (aged 20)	1.72 m	8	6	(Bahrain) Al-Dair
98	LW	Maitham Mahdi	23 January 2004 (aged 21)	1.78 m	5	6	(Bahrain) Barbar

=== Egypt ===
A 18-player squad was announced on 13 June 2025.

Head coach: Magdi Aboelmagd

No.	Pos.	Name	Date of birth (age)	Height	App.	Goals	Club
3	CB	Mohamed El-Sayed	8 January 2004 (aged 21)	1.82 m	38	109	National Bank of Egypt Akex Club
5	RB	Ziad Abdelrahim	18 February 2005 (aged 20)	1.96 m	33	60	National Bank of Egypt Akex Club
8	CB	Ziad Hashad	21 March 2004 (aged 21)	1.82 m	15	30	(Egypt) Zamalek
9	LW	Mohamed El-Nakkady	8 December 2005 (aged 19)	1.87 m	30	90	(Egypt) Zamalek
10	RW	Mohamed Emad	31 January 2004 (aged 21)	1.84 m	15	25	(Egypt) Tala'ea El Gaish
14	CB	Feras Ragab	5 January 2004 (aged 21)	1.88 m	36	68	(Egypt) Alexandria
16	GK	Youssef Ahmed	1 April 2004 (aged 21)	1.87 m	28	6	(Egypt) Alexandria
17	LW	Omar Baraka	30 January 2006 (aged 19)	1.88 m	0	0	(Egypt) Smouha
20	LW	Belal Masoud	8 February 2004 (aged 21)	1.82 m	3	4	(Germany) Bergischer
22	LB	Mohamed Mahmoud	1 January 2004 (aged 21)	1.90 m	22	37	(Egypt) Al Ahly
24	CB	Youssef Laoloua	20 January 2006 (aged 19)	1.91 m	29	65	(France) Nîmes Gard
30	GK	Youssef Salama	15 May 2004 (aged 21)	1.93 m	28	1	(Egypt) Zamalek
44	P	Moaz Azab	10 October 2005 (aged 19)	1.91 m	36	55	(Egypt) Al Ahly
64	LB	Omar Abdelhady	14 January 2004 (aged 21)	1.85 m	22	43	(Egypt) Tala'ea El Gaish
71	RW	Yassin Salem	18 September 2004 (aged 20)	1.83 m	22	33	(Egypt) Smouha
75	RW	Omar Mohamed	29 October 2004 (aged 20)	1.87 m	15	35	(Egypt) El Shams
96	P	Ahmed Taghian	6 January 2004 (aged 21)	1.89 m	10	25	(Egypt) Tala'ea El Gaish
99	LB	Mohamed El-Battawi	17 September 2004 (aged 20)	1.88 m	10	25	(Egypt) Zamalek

=== Saudi Arabia ===
A 20-player squad was announced on 7 June 2025.

Head coach: (Spain) Isidoro Martínez

No.	Pos.	Name	Date of birth (age)	Height	App.	Goals	Club
5	P	Hassan Al-Fadel	15 November 2005 (aged 19)	1.81 m	15	17	(Saudi Arabia) Al-Khaleej
6	CB	Ali Al-Moqbqub	16 January 2004 (aged 21)	1.65 m	11	18	(Saudi Arabia) Al-Noor
8	LB	Bader Al-Qarni	1 September 2006 (aged 18)	1.80 m	10	22	(Saudi Arabia) Al-Ahli
9	CB	Qasem Al-Khowildi	7 May 2006 (aged 19)	1.88 m	23	13	(Saudi Arabia) Al Khowaildiya
11	RB	Amjad Baydhi	6 March 2006 (aged 19)	1.89 m	10	10	(Saudi Arabia) Al-Qadsiah
16	GK	Hussain Al-Safwani	21 May 2004 (aged 21)	1.72 m	22	18	(Saudi Arabia) Al-Noor
17	LW	Mohammed Al-Qaid	10 April 2006 (aged 19)	1.73 m	17	30	(Saudi Arabia) Mudhar
18	RB	Sajjad Al-Fardan	17 July 2004 (aged 20)	1.80 m	24	46	(Saudi Arabia) Mudhar
19	GK	Mohammed Al-Hamad	21 February 2005 (aged 20)	1.85 m	0	0	(Saudi Arabia) Al-Qarah
21	GK	Salman Al-Muyini	11 August 2006 (aged 18)	1.78 m	14	6	(Saudi Arabia) Al-Safa
25	LB	Ahmed Al-Obaidi	20 July 2007 (aged 17)	1.77 m	22	30	(Saudi Arabia) Al-Noor
39	RB	Ahmed Al-Saeed	28 October 2004 (aged 20)	1.85 m	30	66	(Saudi Arabia) Al-Noor
55	LB	Abdullah Al-Marhoon	4 September 2006 (aged 18)	1.77 m	30	39	(Saudi Arabia) Mudhar
59	RW	Hassan Al-Turaiki	8 April 2004 (aged 21)	1.77 m	45	56	(Saudi Arabia) Al-Khaleej
72	P	Ali Al-Yousif	21 February 2005 (aged 20)	1.83 m	12	24	(Saudi Arabia) Al-Noor
77	P	Maitham Abusarer	22 August 2004 (aged 20)	1.84 m	32	44	(Saudi Arabia) Al-Khaleej
89	LW	Ali Al-Khwildi	19 June 2005 (aged 19)	1.70 m	10	28	(Saudi Arabia) Mudhar
99	RW	Hussain Furaij	1 July 2004 (aged 20)	1.79 m	30	86	(Saudi Arabia) Al-Noor

=== Spain ===
A 17-player squad was announced on 26 May 2025.

Head coach: Javier Fernández

No.	Pos.	Name	Date of birth (age)	Height	App.	Goals	Club
1	GK	Pau Panitti	18 July 2004 (aged 20)	1.92 m	22	2	(Spain) Granollers
2	CB	Javier Miñambres	15 October 2004 (aged 20)	1.83 m	17	32	(Spain) Ademar León
3	CB	Petar Cikusa	8 December 2005 (aged 19)	1.88 m	11	57	(Spain) Barcelona
4	P	Jokin Aja	12 September 2004 (aged 20)	2.06 m	17	18	(Spain) Torrelavega
6	RB	Djordje Cikusa	8 December 2005 (aged 19)	1.91 m	12	52	(France) Montpellier
7	P	Víctor Romero	9 March 2004 (aged 21)	1.93 m	17	84	(Spain) Granollers
8	LB	Pablo Herrero	17 February 2004 (aged 21)	1.92 m	3	7	(Spain) Atlético Valladolid
10	LW	Ian Barrufet	19 May 2004 (aged 21)	1.94 m	17	57	(Germany) Melsungen
11	CB	Alejandro Pisonero	22 July 2004 (aged 20)	1.86 m	6	15	(Spain) Atlético Valladolid
12	GK	Álvaro Pérez	9 March 2005 (aged 20)	1.95 m	22	5	(Spain) Ademar León
13	LW	Pablo Guijarro	3 November 2004 (aged 20)	1.83 m	20	23	(Spain) Granollers
14	P	Óscar Grau	16 January 2004 (aged 21)	1.86 m	19	11	(Spain) Barcelona
15	LW	Samuel Sáiz	9 February 2005 (aged 20)	2.00 m	11	12	(Spain) Villa de Aranda
17	P	Josu Arzoz	7 May 2004 (aged 21)	1.86 m	19	22	(Spain) Eón Alicante
18	RW	Xavier González	10 December 2004 (aged 20)	1.80 m	22	104	(Spain) Anaitasuna
19	RW	Alberto Delgado	8 September 2005 (aged 19)	1.72 m	19	43	(Spain) Cisne
21	CB	Manuel Pérez	25 November 2004 (aged 20)	1.81 m	0	0	(Spain) Cangas
