= Petar Cikusa =

Spanish handball player (born 2005)

Personal information
- Full name: Petar Cikuša Jeličić
- Nationality: Spanish
- Born: 8 December 2005 (age 20) Bordils, Spain
- Height: 1.85 m (6 ft 1 in)

Sport
- Sport: Handball
- Position: Central back
- Current club: FC Barcelona
- Number: 88

Youth career
- Years: Team
- –: Bordils
- –: FC Barcelona

Senior clubs
- Years: Team
- –2023: FC Barcelona B
- 2023–: FC Barcelona
National team
Years	Team	Apps	(Gls)
2023–	Spain	13	(20)
- Updated on 27 January 2025

Petar Cikuša Jeličić (born December 8, 2005, in Bordils, Spain) is a Spanish handball player who plays for FC Barcelona and the Spanish national team.

He has played his entire senior career at FC Barcelona, where he came up through the youth ranks. He joined them in 2018 from his hometown club Bordils. In April 2025 he extended his contract with Barcelona until 2019.

With Barcelona he won the 2023-24 EHF Champions League.

On 2 November 2023, he debuted for the national team at the age of 17 against the Netherlands. He played in his first major international tournament at the 2025 World Men's Handball Championship at the age of 19.

== Private life ==
His twin brother Djordje Cikusa is also a professional handball player. They have shared many milestones in their respective career, such as joining Barcelona simultaneously and debuting for the Spanish national team in the same match.

His father Zoran Cikuša was formerly a professional handball player for RK Bjelovar, Croatian handball club, and he is now their handball coach.
