= Djordje Cikusa =

Spanish handball player (born 2005)

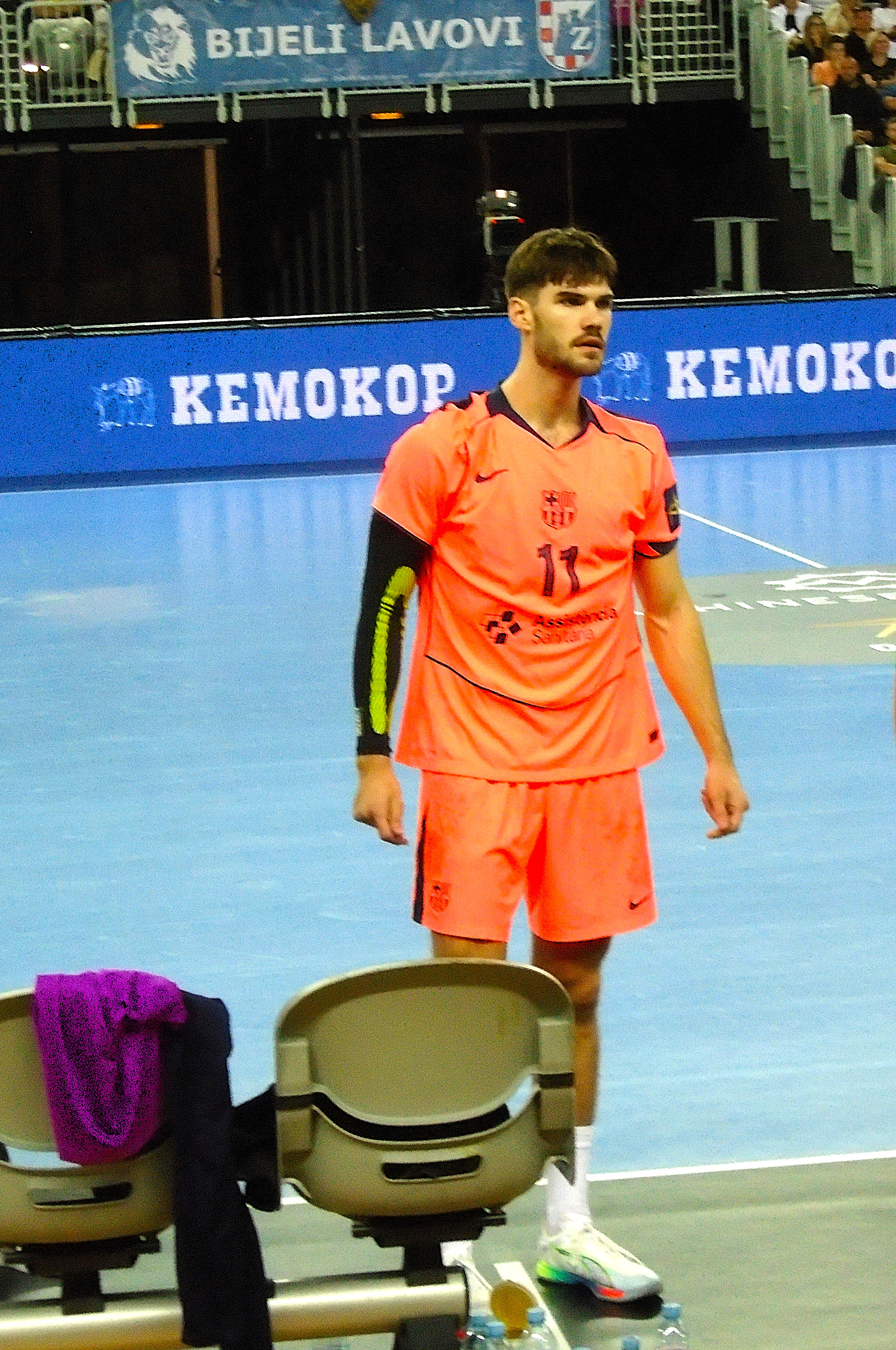
- Cikuša at the match RK Zagreb - Barcelona in Zagreb Arena Sportshall, Croatia, on 25th September 2025

Personal information
- Full name: Đorđe Cikuša Jeličić
- Nationality: Spanish
- Born: 8 December 2005 (age 20) Bordils, Spain
- Height: 1.91 m (6 ft 3 in)

Sport
- Sport: Handball
- Position: Right back
- Current club: FC Barcelona
- Number: 11

Youth career
- Years: Team
- –: Bordils
- –: FC Barcelona

Senior clubs
- Years: Team
- –2024: FC Barcelona B
- 2024–: FC Barcelona
- 2024–2025: → Montpellier Handball
National team
Years	Team	Apps	(Gls)
2023–	Spain	8	(15)
- Updated on 13 January 2025

Đorđe Cikuša Jeličić (born December 8, 2005, in Bordils, Spain) is a Spanish handball player who plays for FC Barcelona and the Spanish national team.

He started his senior career at FC Barcelona, where he came up through the youth ranks. He joined them in 2018 from his hometown club Bordils. He debuted for the senior team in the 2022–23 season, where he won the Liga ASOBAL with the club.

With Barcelona he won the 2023-24 EHF Champions League.

For the 2024–25 season he joined French team Montpellier Handball on loan.

On 2 November 2023 he debuted for the national team at the age of 17. He played in his first major international tournament at the 2025 World Men's Handball Championship at the age of 19.

== Private life ==
His twin brother Petar Cikusa is also a professional handball player. They have shared many milestones in their respective career, such as joining Barcelona simultaneously and debuting for the Spanish national team in the same match.

His father Zoran Cikuša was formerly a professional handball player for RK Bjelovar, Croatian handball club, and he is now their handball coach.
