= Mohamed Cherif =

Mohamed Cherif may refer to:

- Mohamed Cherif Belmihoub (born 1956), Algerian politician
- Mohamed Cherif Haidara (born 2006), Guinean footballer
- Ahmed Bey (1784–1850), Bey of Constantine
