= 2012 European Men's Handball Championship squads =

Every team has to submit a roster of 16 players. On December 16, 2011 an official squad list was published. On January 16 the official squad list was published.

== Group A ==
=== Denmark ===
Head coach: Ulrik Wilbek

No.	Pos.	Name	Date of birth (age)	Height	App.	Goals	Club
1	GK	Niklas Landin	19 December 1988 (aged 23)	2.00 m	57	1	(Denmark) Bjerringbro-Silkeborg
2	CB	Thomas Mogensen	30 January 1983 (aged 28)	1.86 m	73	185	(Germany) SG Flensburg-Handewitt
3	RB	Mads Christiansen	3 May 1986 (aged 25)	1.94 m	39	86	(Denmark) Team Tvis Holstebro
8	CB	Rasmus Lauge Schmidt	20 June 1991 (aged 20)	1.93 m	17	15	(Denmark) Bjerringbro-Silkeborg
9	LW	Lars Christiansen	18 April 1972 (aged 39)	1.82 m	326	1475	(Denmark) KIF Kolding
10	LB	Nikolaj Markussen	1 August 1988 (aged 23)	2.12 m	13	40	(Spain) Atlético Madrid
11	LW	Anders Eggert	14 May 1982 (aged 29)	1.79 m	78	279	(Germany) SG Flensburg-Handewitt
13	CB	Bo Spellerberg	24 July 1979 (aged 32)	1.92 m	185	274	(Denmark) KIF Kolding
17	RW	Lasse Svan Hansen	31 August 1983 (aged 28)	1.84 m	70	143	(Germany) SG Flensburg-Handewitt
18	RW	Hans Lindberg	1 August 1981 (aged 30)	1.88 m	137	367	(Germany) HSV Hamburg
19	P	Rene Toft Hansen	1 November 1984 (aged 27)	2.00 m	38	69	(Denmark) AG København
20	GK	Marcus Cleverly	15 June 1981 (aged 30)	1.88 m	15	0	(Poland) Vive Targi Kielce
22	RB	Kasper Søndergaard	9 June 1981 (aged 30)	1.92 m	92	220	(Denmark) Skjern Håndbold
23	P	Henrik Toft Hansen	18 December 1986 (aged 25)	1.96 m	24	39	(Denmark) AG København
24	LB	Mikkel Hansen	22 October 1987 (aged 24)	1.92 m	69	332	(Denmark) AG København
26	LB	Kasper Nielsen	9 June 1975 (aged 36)	1.91 m	163	286	(Denmark) Bjerringbro-Silkeborg

=== Poland ===
Head coach: Bogdan Wenta

No.	Pos.	Name	Date of birth (age)	Height	App.	Goals	Club
2	CB	Bartłomiej Jaszka	16 June 1983 (aged 28)	1.84 m	110	179	(Germany) Füchse Berlin
3	RB	Krzysztof Lijewski	7 July 1983 (aged 28)	1.98 m	110	223	(Germany) Rhein-Neckar Löwen
4	RW	Patryk Kuchczyński	17 March 1983 (aged 28)	1.82 m	169	338	(Poland) Vive Targi Kielce
6	CB	Grzegorz Tkaczyk	22 December 1980 (aged 31)	1.90 m	147	515	(Poland) Vive Targi Kielce
8	LB	Karol Bielecki	23 January 1982 (aged 29)	2.02 m	165	683	(Germany) Rhein-Neckar Löwen
11	LW	Adam Wiśniewski	24 October 1980 (aged 31)	1.92 m	61	117	(Poland) Wisła Płock
12	GK	Marcin Wichary	17 February 1980 (aged 31)	1.93 m	72	0	(Poland) Wisła Płock
13	P	Bartosz Jurecki	30 January 1979 (aged 32)	1.93 m	151	487	(Germany) SC Magdeburg
15	LB	Michał Jurecki	27 October 1984 (aged 27)	2.02 m	113	263	(Poland) Vive Targi Kielce
16	GK	Piotr Wyszomirski	6 January 1988 (aged 24)	1.93 m	41	0	(Poland) Azoty-Puławy
19	LW	Tomasz Tłuczyński	19 April 1979 (aged 32)	1.82 m	116	475	(Germany) TuS N-Lübbecke
20	LB	Mariusz Jurkiewicz	3 February 1982 (aged 29)	1.98 m	97	155	(Spain) Atlético Madrid
23	P	Kamil Syprzak	23 July 1991 (aged 20)	2.08 m	0	0	(Poland) Wisła Płock
29	P	Zbigniew Kwiatkowski	2 April 1985 (aged 26)	2.02 m	26	15	(Poland) Wisła Płock
41	RB	Mateusz Zaremba	27 October 1984 (aged 27)	1.98 m	21	30	(Poland) Vive Targi Kielce
43	RW	Robert Orzechowski	20 November 1989 (aged 22)	1.89 m	18	20	(Poland) MMTS Kwidzyn

=== Serbia ===
Head coach: Veselin Vuković

No.	Pos.	Name	Date of birth (age)	Height	App.	Goals	Club
1	GK	Dragan Marjanac	26 February 1985 (aged 26)	1.92 m	42	1	(Switzerland) BSV Bern Muri
2	CB	Željko Lazović	26 December 1988 (aged 23)	1.92 m	50	30	(Serbia) RK Crvena Zvezda
5	LB	Žarko Šešum	16 June 1986 (aged 25)	1.95 m	91	246	(Germany) Rhein-Neckar Löwen
6	RB	Marko Vujin	7 December 1984 (aged 27)	1.96 m	64	273	(Hungary) MKB Veszprém KC
7	LW	Milan Rondović	11 March 1988 (aged 23)	1.81 m	79	298	(Serbia) RK Crvena Zvezda
8	P	Željko Šćekić	11 March 1988 (aged 23)	1.91 m	79	298	(Serbia) RK Crvena Zvezda
9	CB	Nikola Manojlović	1 December 1981 (aged 30)	1.99 m	18	29	(Slovenia) RK Gorenje
11	P	Alem Toskić	12 February 1982 (aged 29)	1.90 m	108	231	(Slovenia) Celje Pivovarna Laško
12	GK	Darko Stanić	8 October 1978 (aged 33)	1.90 m	59	0	(North Macedonia) RK Metalurg
13	LB	Momir Ilić	22 December 1981 (aged 30)	2.00 m	89	291	(Germany) THW Kiel
15	LW	Dobrivoje Marković	22 April 1986 (aged 25)	1.91 m	74	159	(North Macedonia) RK Vardar
16	GK	Strahinja Milić	19 December 1990 (aged 21)	1.99 m	33	80	(Serbia) RK Partizan
17	RW	Rajko Prodanović	24 April 1986 (aged 25)	1.86 m	72	165	(Hungary) SC Pick Szeged
18	P	Rastko Stojković	12 July 1981 (aged 30)	1.90 m	47	111	(Poland) Vive Targi Kielce
20	LB	Momir Rnić	1 November 1987 (aged 24)	1.97 m	44	74	(Germany) Frisch Auf Göppingen
21	RW	Miloš Kostadinović	2 December 1988 (aged 23)	1.83 m	1	0	(Serbia) RK Partizan
22	P	Bojan Beljanski	22 June 1986 (aged 25)	2.00 m	21	33	(Switzerland) HC Kriens-Luzern
23	CB	Nenad Vučković	23 August 1980 (aged 31)	1.90 m	47	111	(Germany) MT Melsungen
25	CB	Dalibor Čutura	14 June 1976 (aged 35)	1.95 m	91	24	(Spain) Ademar León
26	RB	Ivan Stanković	1 April 1981 (aged 31)	1.95 m	91	24	(France) US Créteil
31	CB	Petar Nenadić	7 March 1986 (aged 26)	1.99 m	33	80	(Denmark) Team Tvis Holstebro

=== Slovakia ===
Head coach: Zoltán Heister

No.	Pos.	Name	Date of birth (age)	Height	App.	Goals	Club
1	GK	Miloš Putera	26 January 1982 (aged 29)	1.94 m	14	0	(Germany) TV 05/07 Huttenberg
2	LB	Oliver Rábek	30 September 1987 (aged 24)	2.04 m	7	20	(Slovakia) TJ Štart Nové Zámky
4	CB	Peter Kukučka	20 July 1982 (aged 29)	1.88 m	92	324	(Switzerland) Kadetten Schaffhausen
5	LB	Ladislav Tarhai	24 February 1985 (aged 26)	1.95 m	34	81	(Switzerland) BSV Bern Muri
7	P	Péter Dudás	26 January 1984 (aged 27)	1.94 m	22	34	(Slovakia) HC Sporta Hlohovec
8	RB	Patrik Hruščák	23 January 1985 (aged 26)	1.92 m	13	16	(Slovakia) 1. MHK Košice
9	LB	Daniel Valo	7 May 1979 (aged 32)	2.03 m	135	520	(Germany) HSG Wetzlar
10	P	Michal Kopčo	27 January 1988 (aged 23)	1.89 m	54	95	(Slovakia) HT Tatran Prešov
12	GK	Richard Štochl	17 December 1975 (aged 36)	2.00 m	212	7	(France) Montpellier HB
14	P	Andrej Petro	28 January 1986 (aged 25)	1.99 m	75	115	(Germany) DHC Rheinland Dormagen
16	GK	Ladislav Kovačin	4 July 1986 (aged 25)	1.96 m	1	0	(Slovakia) MŠK Považská Bystrica
18	RB	Marek Mikeci	3 February 1986 (aged 25)	1.92 m	22	46	(Slovakia) TJ Štart Nové Zámky
19	CB	Ľubomír Ďuriš	5 September 1987 (aged 24)	1.75 m	1	5	(Slovakia) HC Sporta Hlohovec
20	CB	Tomáš Urban	29 August 1986 (aged 25)	1.82 m	1	1	(Slovakia) HT Tatran Prešov
24	LW	Martin Straňovský	12 September 1985 (aged 26)	1.88 m	96	343	(Spain) CB Ademar León
28	LW	Radoslav Antl	2 March 1978 (aged 33)	1.79 m	134	538	(Slovakia) HT Tatran Prešov

== Group B ==
=== Czech Republic ===
Head coach: Martin Lipták

No.	Pos.	Name	Date of birth (age)	Height	App.	Goals	Club
2	LW	Karel Nocar	28 February 1977 (aged 34)	1.84 m	170	396	(France) Chambéry Savoie Handball
3	RB	Jiří Vítek	14 May 1977 (aged 34)	1.95 m	82	209	(Germany) Bergischer HC
6	P	Václav Vraný	13 September 1982 (aged 29)	2.02 m	47	89	(Switzerland) Kadetten Schaffhausen
7	LB	Daniel Kubeš	7 February 1978 (aged 33)	1.99 m	108	194	(Germany) THW Kiel
8	LW	Jiří Motl	29 September 1984 (aged 27)	1.84 m	43	79	(Czech Republic) HC Lovosice
9	LB	Filip Jícha	19 April 1982 (aged 29)	2.00 m	118	658	(Germany) THW Kiel
10	RW	Jan Filip	14 June 1973 (aged 38)	1.88 m	191	960	(Switzerland) St. Gallen
11	RW	Jan Sobol	22 May 1984 (aged 27)	1.88 m	72	223	(North Macedonia) RK Vardar
13	LB	Pavel Horák	28 November 1982 (aged 29)	1.98 m	49	146	(Germany) Frisch Auf Göppingen
15	LB	Alois Mráz	8 September 1978 (aged 33)	1.95 m	116	290	(Germany) HSG Wetzlar
16	GK	Martin Galia	12 April 1979 (aged 32)	1.89 m	128	3	(Germany) TV Grosswallstadt
17	P	David Juříček	8 August 1974 (aged 37)	1.87 m	131	414	(France) St-Raphaël Var HB
18	RB	Jan Stehlík	18 April 1985 (aged 26)	1.88 m	38	75	(France) St-Raphaël Var HB
19	CB	Jiří Hynek	7 June 1981 (aged 30)	1.98 m	71	12	(Germany) ASV Hamm
22	CB	Tomáš Sklenák	2 March 1982 (aged 29)	1.86 m	28	100	(Germany) ThSV Eisenach
71	GK	Petr Štochl	24 April 1976 (aged 35)	1.93 m	148	2	(Germany) Füchse Berlin

=== Germany ===
Head coach: Martin Heuberger

No.	Pos.	Name	Date of birth (age)	Height	App.	Goals	Club
2	LB	Pascal Hens	26 March 1980 (aged 31)	2.03 m	193	562	(Germany) HSV Hamburg
3	LW	Uwe Gensheimer	26 October 1986 (aged 25)	1.88 m	63	212	(Germany) Rhein-Neckar Löwen
4	P	Oliver Roggisch	25 August 1978 (aged 33)	1.90 m	165	31	(Germany) Rhein-Neckar Löwen
5	LW	Dominik Klein	16 December 1983 (aged 28)	1.90 m	139	264	(Germany) THW Kiel
6	RB	Adrian Pfahl	30 July 1982 (aged 29)	1.92 m	29	85	(Germany) VfL Gummersbach
7	P	Patrick Wiencek	22 March 1989 (aged 22)	2.00 m	11	15	(Germany) VfL Gummersbach
8	P	Christoph Theuerkauf	13 October 1984 (aged 27)	1.90 m	30	60	(Germany) TBV Lemgo
11	RB	Holger Glandorf	30 March 1983 (aged 28)	1.95 m	146	516	(Germany) SG Flensburg-Handewitt
12	GK	Silvio Heinevetter	21 October 1984 (aged 27)	1.94 m	67	0	(Germany) Füchse Berlin
13	LB	Sven-Sören Christophersen	5 September 1985 (aged 26)	1.98 m	65	92	(Germany) Füchse Berlin
14	RW	Patrick Groetzki	4 July 1989 (aged 22)	1.89 m	31	61	(Germany) Rhein-Neckar Löwen
16	GK	Carsten Lichtlein	11 April 1980 (aged 31)	2.02 m	140	1	(Germany) TBV Lemgo
19	CB	Martin Strobel	5 June 1986 (aged 25)	1.89 m	55	67	(Germany) TBV Lemgo
20	RW	Christian Sprenger	6 April 1983 (aged 28)	1.90 m	80	171	(Germany) THW Kiel
21	LB	Lars Kaufmann	25 February 1982 (aged 29)	1.99 m	119	289	(Germany) SG Flensburg-Handewitt
24	CB	Michael Haaß	12 December 1983 (aged 28)	1.94 m	87	126	(Germany) Frisch Auf Göppingen

=== North Macedonia ===
Head coach: Zvonko Šundovski

No.	Pos.	Name	Date of birth (age)	Height	App.	Goals	Club
3	LW	Dejan Manaskov	26 August 1992 (aged 19)	1.80 m	8	9	(North Macedonia) RK Metalurg
5	P	Stojanče Stoilov	30 April 1987 (aged 24)	1.92 m	15	19	(North Macedonia) RK Vardar
6	LW	Stevče Aluševski	1 October 1972 (aged 39)	1.90 m	128	329	(North Macedonia) RK Metalurg
7	RB	Kiril Lazarov	10 May 1980 (aged 31)	1.93 m	107	839	(Spain) Atlético Madrid
8	RB	Vlatko Mitkov	16 August 1981 (aged 30)	1.92 m	71	63	(Austria) HSG Bärnbach/Köflach
9	LB	Aco Jonovski	29 December 1980 (aged 31)	1.97 m	49	62	(North Macedonia) RK Metalurg
10	CB	Branislav Angelovski	21 February 1977 (aged 34)	1.92 m	73	148	(Romania) HCM Constanța
11	RW	Vladimir Temelkov	26 March 1980 (aged 31)	1.85 m	71	228	(Luxembourg) HC Bascharage
13	CB	Filip Mirkulovski	14 September 1983 (aged 28)	1.89 m	86	211	(North Macedonia) RK Metalurg
14	LB	Velko Markoski	5 April 1986 (aged 25)	1.94 m	36	54	(North Macedonia) RK Metalurg
15	RW	Zlatko Mojsoski	15 November 1981 (aged 30)	1.80 m	23	43	(North Macedonia) RK Metalurg
16	GK	Borko Ristovski	2 November 1982 (aged 29)	1.90 m	108	3	(North Macedonia) RK Vardar
18	CB	Naumče Mojsovski	17 June 1980 (aged 31)	1.87 m	101	141	(North Macedonia) RK Metalurg
19	P	Vancho Dimovski	4 April 1979 (aged 32)	1.87 m	96	211	(North Macedonia) RK Metalurg
20	GK	Petar Angelov	8 March 1977 (aged 34)	1.85 m	29	0	(North Macedonia) RK Metalurg
23	LB	Filip Lazarov	21 April 1985 (aged 26)	1.97 m	39	97	(North Macedonia) RK Vardar

=== Sweden ===
Head coach: Staffan Olsson/Ola Lindgren

No.	Pos.	Name	Date of birth (age)	Height	App.	Goals	Club
1	GK	Mattias Andersson	29 March 1978 (aged 33)	1.86 m	71	0	(Germany) SG Flensburg-Handewitt
4	LW	Henrik Lundström	13 November 1979 (aged 32)	1.85 m	90	221	(Germany) THW Kiel
5	RB	Kim Andersson	21 August 1982 (aged 29)	2.00 m	178	649	(Germany) THW Kiel
7	P	Magnus Jernemyr	18 July 1976 (aged 35)	1.99 m	74	5	(Spain) FC Barcelona
10	RW	Niclas Ekberg	23 December 1988 (aged 23)	1.91 m	49	192	(Denmark) AG København
11	CB	Dalibor Doder	24 May 1979 (aged 32)	1.82 m	122	370	(Germany) GWD Minden
12	GK	Andreas Palicka	10 July 1986 (aged 25)	1.89 m	26	0	(Germany) THW Kiel
13	LB	Jonathan Stenbäcken	7 January 1988 (aged 24)	1.95 m	20	27	(Germany) Füchse Berlin
15	LB/CB	Jonas Larholm	3 June 1982 (aged 29)	1.93 m	166	546	(Denmark) Aalborg Håndbold
18	P	Tobias Karlsson	4 June 1981 (aged 30)	1.96 m	93	59	(Germany) SG Flensburg-Handewitt
19	RB	Johan Jakobsson	12 February 1987 (aged 24)	1.95 m	31	33	(Denmark) Aalborg Håndbold
22	GK	Johan Sjöstrand	26 February 1987 (aged 24)	1.95 m	43	0	(Spain) FC Barcelona
24	LW	Fredrik Petersen	23 August 1983 (aged 28)	1.88 m	61	157	(Denmark) Bjerringbro-Silkeborg
25	LW	Kim Ekdahl du Rietz	27 March 1989 (aged 22)	1.96 m	38	97	(France) HBC Nantes
27	P	Niclas Barud	22 March 1988 (aged 23)	1.96 m	8	10	(Sweden) IK Sävehof
35	P	Andreas Nilsson	12 April 1990 (aged 21)	1.96 m	7	8	(Sweden) IFK Skövde

== Group C ==
=== France ===
Head coach: Claude Onesta

No.	Pos.	Name	Date of birth (age)	Height	App.	Goals	Club
2	LB	Jérôme Fernandez	7 March 1977 (aged 34)	1.99 m	323	1284	(France) Fénix Toulouse Handball
3	P	Didier Dinart	18 January 1977 (aged 34)	1.97 m	347	158	(Spain) Atlético Madrid
4	RB	Xavier Barachet	19 January 1988 (aged 23)	1.95 m	33	59	(France) Chambéry Savoie Handball
5	CB	Guillaume Gille	12 July 1976 (aged 35)	1.92 m	287	673	(Germany) HSV Hamburg
6	P	Bertrand Gille	24 March 1978 (aged 33)	1.87 m	247	761	(Germany) HSV Hamburg
8	LB	Daniel Narcisse	16 December 1979 (aged 32)	1.89 m	214	678	(Germany) THW Kiel
9	RW	Guillaume Joli	27 March 1985 (aged 26)	1.78 m	57	147	(Spain) BM Valladolid
11	LW	Samuel Honrubia	5 July 1986 (aged 25)	1.80 m	23	6ß	(France) Montpellier HB
12	GK	Daouda Karaboué	11 December 1975 (aged 36)	1.98 m	121	0	(France) Fénix Toulouse Handball
13	CB	Nikola Karabatić	11 April 1984 (aged 27)	1.96 m	178	762	(France) Montpellier HB
16	GK	Thierry Omeyer	2 November 1976 (aged 35)	1.92 m	258	9	(Germany) THW Kiel
18	LB	William Accambray	8 April 1988 (aged 23)	1.94 m	26	91	(France) Montpellier HB
19	RW	Luc Abalo	6 September 1984 (aged 27)	1.82 m	138	471	(Spain) Atlético Madrid
20	P	Cédric Sorhaindo	7 June 1984 (aged 27)	1.92 m	80	134	(Spain) FC Barcelona
21	LW	Michaël Guigou	28 January 1982 (aged 29)	1.79 m	151	546	(France) Montpellier HB
25	P	Grégoire Detrez	22 May 1981 (aged 30)	1.85 m	32	40	(France) Chambéry Savoie Handball
27	LW	Arnaud Bingo	12 October 1987 (aged 24)	1.90 m	20	22	Tremblay en France HB

=== Hungary ===
Head coach: Lajos Mocsai

No.	Pos.	Name	Date of birth (age)	Height	App.	Goals	Club
3	LB	Ferenc Ilyés	20 December 1981 (aged 30)	1.98 m	155	425	(Hungary) MKB Veszprém KC
4	P	Szabolcs Szöllősi	28 January 1989 (aged 22)	1.94 m	4	5	(Hungary) Csurgói KK
5	CB	Gábor Császár	16 June 1984 (aged 27)	1.83 m	140	416	(Hungary) MKB Veszprém KC
6	RB	Tamás Mocsai	9 December 1978 (aged 33)	1.96 m	134	327	(Germany) SG Flensburg-Handewitt
8	LW	Gergő Iváncsik	30 November 1981 (aged 30)	1.90 m	187	510	(Hungary) MKB Veszprém KC
9	RW	Tamás Iváncsik	3 April 1983 (aged 28)	1.80 m	102	239	(Hungary) MKB Veszprém KC
10	RW	Gergely Harsányi	3 May 1981 (aged 30)	1.91 m	98	153	(Hungary) Tatabánya-Carbonex KC
11	LB	Barna Putics	18 August 1984 (aged 27)	2.00 m	37	107	(Germany) VfL Gummersbach
12	GK	Nándor Fazekas	16 October 1976 (aged 35)	1.92 m	190	1	(Hungary) MKB Veszprém KC
13	RB	Milorad Krivokapić	30 July 1980 (aged 31)	1.90 m	10	41	(Slovenia) RK Cimos Koper
16	GK	Roland Mikler	20 September 1984 (aged 27)	1.90 m	76	0	(Hungary) SC Pick Szeged
17	RB	Balázs Laluska	20 June 1981 (aged 30)	2.02 m	123	199	(Hungary) MKB Veszprém KC
18	CB	Kornél Nagy	21 November 1986 (aged 25)	1.92 m	67	98	(France) Dunkerque HB
24	LW	Attila Vadkerti	22 February 1982 (aged 29)	1.82 m	50	72	(Hungary) SC Pick Szeged
25	P	Szabolcs Zubai	31 March 1984 (aged 27)	1.91 m	112	168	(Hungary) SC Pick Szeged
28	P	Timuzsin Schuch	5 June 1985 (aged 26)	1.97 m	50	41	(Hungary) MKB Veszprém KC
33	RB	Gábor Ancsin	27 November 1990 (aged 21)	2.00 m	7	14	(Hungary) SC Pick Szeged

=== Russia ===
Head coach: Vladimir Maksimov

No.	Pos.	Name	Date of birth (age)	Height	App.	Goals	Club
1	GK	Oleg Grams	20 February 1984 (aged 27)	2.01 m	85	0	(Russia) Chekhovskiye Medvedi
2	CB	Vasily Filippov	18 January 1981 (aged 30)	1.83 m	119	277	(Russia) Chekhovskiye Medvedi
4	LB	Dmitry Erokhin	26 February 1983 (aged 28)	2.04 m	1	0	(Russia) Chekhovskiye Medvedi
7	RW	Dmitry Kovalev	15 May 1982 (aged 29)	1.80 m	108	252	(Russia) Chekhovskiye Medvedi
10	P	Alexander Chernoivanov	13 February 1979 (aged 32)	2.03 m	98	197	(Russia) Chekhovskiye Medvedi
11	CB	Pavel Atman	25 May 1987 (aged 24)	1.90 m	26	20	(Belarus) HC Dinamo-Minsk
12	GK	Vadim Bogdanov	26 March 1986 (aged 25)	1.97 m	7	0	(Russia) St. Petersburg HC
15	LB	Alexey Rastvortsev	8 August 1978 (aged 33)	2.00 m	231	886	(Russia) Chekhovskiye Medvedi
19	RB	Samvel Aslanyan	23 February 1986 (aged 25)	1.86 m	59	95	(Russia) Chekhovskiye Medvedi
20	P	Mikhail Chipurin	17 November 1980 (aged 31)	1.90 m	141	378	(Russia) Chekhovskiye Medvedi
23	LW	Eduard Koksharov	4 November 1975 (aged 36)	1.85 m	220	1100	(Russia) Chekhovskiye Medvedi
25	RB	Sergey Shelmenko	5 April 1983 (aged 28)	1.96 m	0	0	(Russia) Chekhovskiye Medvedi
31	LW	Timur Dibirov	30 July 1983 (aged 28)	1.80 m	102	314	(Russia) Chekhovskiye Medvedi
35	RB	Konstantin Igropulo	14 April 1985 (aged 26)	1.90 m	89	434	(Spain) FC Barcelona
47	LB	Andrey Starykh	2 February 1984 (aged 27)	1.98 m	50	89	(Russia) Chekhovskiye Medvedi
77	CB	Vitali Ivanov	3 February 1976 (aged 35)	1.94 m	231	518	(Russia) Chekhovskiye Medvedi

=== Spain ===
Head coach: Valero Rivera

No.	Pos.	Name	Date of birth (age)	Height	App.	Goals	Club
1	GK	José Javier Hombrados	7 April 1972 (aged 39)	1.97 m	241	1	(Spain) Atlético Madrid
2	LB	Alberto Entrerrios	7 November 1976 (aged 35)	1.94 m	216	667	(Spain) Atlético Madrid
3	RB	Eduardo Gurbindo	8 November 1987 (aged 24)	1.94 m	35	61	(Spain) BM Valladolid
4	RW	Albert Rocas	16 June 1982 (aged 29)	1.88 m	114	417	(Spain) FC Barcelona
5	RB	Jorge Maqueda	6 December 1988 (aged 23)	1.97 m	27	31	(Spain) BM Aragón
8	RW	Víctor Tomás	15 February 1985 (aged 26)	1.78 m	75	234	(Spain) FC Barcelona
9	CB	Raúl Entrerríos	12 February 1981 (aged 30)	1.93 m	138	295	(Spain) FC Barcelona
11	CB	Daniel Sarmiento	25 August 1983 (aged 28)	1.86 m	17	45	(Spain) FC Barcelona
12	GK	José Manuel Sierra	21 May 1978 (aged 33)	1.94 m	63	0	(Spain) BM Valladolid
13	P	Julen Aguinagalde	8 December 1982 (aged 29)	1.95 m	73	176	(Spain) Atlético Madrid
14	RW	Roberto García	12 January 1980 (aged 32)	1.87 m	74	174	(Spain) Atlético Madrid
15	LW	Cristian Ugalde	19 October 1987 (aged 24)	1.87 m	59	127	(Spain) FC Barcelona
17	LW	Juanín García	28 August 1977 (aged 34)	1.76 m	194	792	(Spain) FC Barcelona
18	LB	Iker Romero	15 June 1980 (aged 31)	1.97 m	189	723	(Germany) Füchse Berlin
21	CB	Joan Cañellas	30 September 1986 (aged 25)	1.96 m	46	113	(Spain) Atlético Madrid
24	LB	Viran Morros	15 December 1983 (aged 28)	1.99 m	79	95	(Spain) FC Barcelona
30	P	Gedeón Guardiola	1 October 1984 (aged 27)	1.99 m	3	2	(Spain) SDC San Antonio

== Group D ==
=== Croatia ===
Head coach: Slavko Goluža

No.	Pos.	Name	Date of birth (age)	Height	App.	Goals	Club
4	CB	Ivano Balić	1 April 1979 (aged 32)	1.91 m	181	519	(Croatia) RK Zagreb
5	CB	Domagoj Duvnjak	1 June 1988 (aged 23)	1.97 m	82	256	(Germany) HSV Hamburg
6	LB	Blaženko Lacković	25 December 1980 (aged 31)	1.96 m	162	477	(Germany) HSV Hamburg
8	RB	Marko Kopljar	12 February 1986 (aged 25)	2.10 m	51	71	(Croatia) RK Zagreb
9	P	Igor Vori	20 September 1980 (aged 31)	2.03 m	168	446	(Germany) HSV Hamburg
10	LB	Jakov Gojun	18 April 1986 (aged 25)	2.04 m	50	24	(Croatia) RK Zagreb
12	GK	Venio Losert	25 July 1976 (aged 35)	1.91 m	181	0	(Spain) CB Ademar León
13	RW	Zlatko Horvat	25 September 1984 (aged 27)	1.79 m	54	108	(Croatia) RK Zagreb
14	LB	Drago Vuković	3 August 1983 (aged 28)	1.94 m	97	158	(Germany) TuS Nettelstedt-Lübbecke
20	LB	Damir Bičanić	25 June 1985 (aged 26)	1.94 m	30	49	(France) Chambéry Savoie Handball
21	RB	Denis Buntić	13 October 1982 (aged 29)	1.99 m	85	194	(Poland) Vive Targi Kielce
25	GK	Mirko Alilović	15 September 1985 (aged 26)	2.00 m	84	0	(Hungary) MKB Veszprém KC
26	LW	Manuel Štrlek	1 December 1988 (aged 23)	1.81 m	33	100	(Croatia) RK Zagreb
27	RW	Ivan Čupić	27 March 1986 (aged 25)	1.78 m	56	175	(Germany) Rhein-Neckar Löwen
28	P	Željko Musa	8 January 1986 (aged 26)	2.00 m	25	17	(Slovenia) RK Gorenje
29	LW	Ivan Ninčević	27 October 1981 (aged 30)	1.84 m	26	38	(Germany) Füchse Berlin

=== Iceland ===
Head coach: Guðmundur Guðmundsson

No.	Pos.	Name	Date of birth (age)	Height	App.	Goals	Club
1	GK	Björgvin Páll Gústavsson	24 May 1985 (aged 26)	1.93 m	90	3	(Germany) SC Magdeburg
2	P	Vignir Svavarsson	20 June 1980 (aged 31)	1.94 m	150	163	(Germany) TSV Hannover-Burgdorf
3	P	Kári Kristján Kristjánsson	23 April 1981 (aged 30)	1.98 m	27	25	(Germany) HSG Wetzlar
4	CB	Aron Pálmarsson	19 July 1990 (aged 21)	1.93 m	41	118	(Germany) THW Kiel
5	LB	Ingimundur Ingimundarson	29 January 1980 (aged 31)	1.93 m	94	72	(Iceland) Fram
6	RW	Ásgeir Örn Hallgrímsson	17 February 1984 (aged 27)	1.91 m	149	187	(Germany) TSV Hannover-Burgdorf
7	LB	Arnór Atlason	23 July 1984 (aged 27)	1.91 m	114	268	(Denmark) AG København
8	RW	Þórir Ólafsson	28 November 1979 (aged 32)	1.89 m	64	140	(Poland) Vive Targi Kielce
9	LB	Guðjón Valur Sigurðsson	8 August 1979 (aged 32)	1.87 m	249	1205	(Denmark) AG København
12	GK	Aron Rafn Eðvarðsson	1 September 1989 (aged 22)	2.02 m	3	0	(Iceland) Haukar
13	LW	Oddur Grétarsson	20 July 1990 (aged 21)	1.81 m	15	24	(Iceland) Akureyrar
14	LB	Ólafur Andrés Guðmundsson	13 May 1990 (aged 21)	1.94 m	22	22	(Denmark) Nordsjælland Håndbold
15	RW	Alexander Petersson	2 July 1980 (aged 31)	1.86 m	124	505	(Germany) Füchse Berlin
16	GK	Hreiðar Guðmundsson	29 November 1980 (aged 31)	1.93 m	120	2	(Norway) Nøtterøy IF
17	P	Sverre Jakobsson	8 February 1977 (aged 34)	1.96 m	111	24	(Germany) TV Grosswallstadt
18	P	Róbert Gunnarsson	22 May 1980 (aged 31)	1.90 m	189	592	(Germany) Rhein-Neckar Löwen
19	RB	Rúnar Kárason	24 May 1988 (aged 23)	1.96 m	21	49	(Germany) Bergischer HC
21	CB	Ólafur Bjarki Ragnarsson	12 July 1988 (aged 23)	1.92 m	2	0	(Iceland) HK Kópavogs

=== Norway ===
Head coach: Robert Hedin

No.	Pos.	Name	Date of birth (age)	Height	App.	Goals	Club
2	CB	Kenneth Ryvoll Klev	15 October 1978 (aged 33)	1.99 m	38	65	(Germany) Bergischer HC
6	CB	Vegard Samdahl	21 March 1978 (aged 33)	1.94 m	73	103	(Norway) Viking Stavanger HK
7	RW	Lars Erik Bjørnsen	20 July 1982 (aged 29)	1.83 m	85	168	(Norway) Drammen HK
8	P	Bjarte Myrhol	29 May 1982 (aged 29)	1.94 m	124	336	(Germany) Rhein-Neckar Löwen
9	CB	Børge Lund	13 March 1979 (aged 32)	1.96 m	188	357	(Germany) Rhein-Neckar Löwen
10	LW	Håvard Tvedten	29 June 1978 (aged 33)	1.82 m	184	713	(Denmark) Aalborg Håndbold
11	LB	Erlend Mamelund	1 May 1984 (aged 27)	1.97 m	90	268	(Norway) Haslum HK
12	GK	Ole Erevik	9 January 1981 (aged 31)	1.96 m	123	0	(Denmark) Aalborg Håndbold
13	LB	Christoffer Rambo	18 November 1989 (aged 22)	2.01 m	48	113	(Norway) Elverum Håndball
14	LB	Espen Lie Hansen	1 March 1989 (aged 22)	1.96 m	34	103	(Denmark) Bjerringbro-Silkeborg
16	GK	Svenn Erik Medhus	22 June 1982 (aged 29)	2.00 m	31	0	(Norway) Øyestad IF
17	LW	Magnus Jøndal	7 February 1988 (aged 23)	1.85 m	16	23	(Norway) Follo HK
18	P	Johnny Jensen	17 February 1972 (aged 39)	1.96 m	194	288	(Norway) Nøtterøy IF
20	P	Einar Riegelhuth Koren	12 November 1984 (aged 27)	1.88 m	55	96	(Norway) Haslum HK
23	RW	Sondre Paulsen	21 May 1988 (aged 23)	1.90 m	24	52	(Norway) ØIF Arendal
26	RB	Kent Robin Tønnesen	5 June 1991 (aged 20)	1.96 m	4	10	(Norway) Haslum HK

=== Slovenia ===
Head coach: Boris Denić

No.	Pos.	Name	Date of birth (age)	Height	App.	Goals	Club
4	RB	David Miklavčič	29 January 1983 (aged 28)	1.96 m	35	69	(Slovenia) RK Gorenje
5	LW	Jure Dobelšek	1 April 1984 (aged 27)	1.93 m	54	85	(Slovenia) RK Cimos Koper
6	P	Peter Pucelj	6 December 1982 (aged 29)	1.92 m	18	17	(Serbia) RK Crvena Zvezda
7	RW	Matjaž Brumen	23 December 1982 (aged 29)	1.90 m	120	345	(Slovenia) RK Cimos Koper
8	CB	Marko Bezjak	26 June 1986 (aged 25)	1.84 m	13	23	(Slovenia) RK Gorenje
10	RB	Jure Dolenec	6 December 1988 (aged 23)	1.90 m	12	53	(Slovenia) RK Gorenje
11	CB	Sebastian Skube	3 April 1987 (aged 24)	1.89 m	44	104	(Slovenia) RK Cimos Koper
12	GK	Gorazd Škof	11 July 1977 (aged 34)	1.88 m	118	0	(Slovenia) RK Cimos Koper
13	LB	David Špiler	2 January 1983 (aged 29)	1.90 m	93	226	(Croatia) RK Zagreb
16	GK	Primož Prošt	14 July 1983 (aged 28)	1.86 m	26	0	(France) Montpellier HB
19	P	Miha Žvižej	6 November 1987 (aged 24)	1.93 m	33	88	(Denmark) Bjerringbro-Silkeborg
20	LW	Luka Žvižej	9 December 1980 (aged 31)	1.85 m	155	472	(Slovenia) Celje Pivovarna Laško
22	P	Matej Gaber	22 July 1991 (aged 20)	1.97 m	4	2	(Slovenia) RK Gorenje
23	CB	Uroš Zorman	9 January 1980 (aged 32)	1.90 m	155	392	(Poland) Vive Targi Kielce
25	LB	Borut Mačkovšek	11 September 1992 (aged 19)	2.04 m	3	5	(Slovenia) Celje Pivovarna Laško
30	RW	Dragan Gajič	21 July 1984 (aged 27)	1.88 m	94	252	(France) Montpellier HB
