= Arnulf Meffle =

German handball player (born 1957)

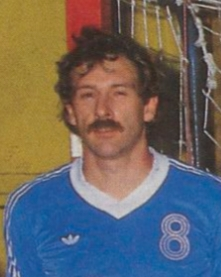
- Meffle in 1988

Personal information
- Born: 1 December 1957 (age 68) Schutterwald-Langhurst, West Germany
- Height: 1.84 m (6 ft 0 in)

Sport
- Sport: Handball

Youth career
- Years: Team
- –: TuS Schutterwald

Senior clubs
- Years: Team
- –: TuS Schutterwald
- -1988: TuS Hofweier
- 1987-1988: Racing Club Strasbourg
- 1988-1989: TuS Hofweier
National team
Years	Team	Apps	(Gls)
1977-1984	West Germany	71	(117)
Medal record
Men's handball
Representing West Germany
Olympic Games
Silver medal – second place	1984 Los Angeles	Team
World Championship
Gold medal – first place	1978 Denmark	Team

Arnulf Meffle (born 1 December 1957) is a former West German handball player who competed in the 1984 Summer Olympics.

He was a member of the West German handball team which won the silver medal. He played all six matches and scored fourteen goals.

He also represented Germany at the 1978 World Men's Handball Championship, where Germany won gold medals.

He joined Racing Club Strasbourg in 1987 as only the second German expatriate professional handball player ever, behind Erhard Wunderlich.
