= TuS Schutterwald =

German handball club

- Full name: Turn- und Sportverein Schutterwald
- Founded: June 1, 1900; 125 years ago
- Arena: Mörburghalle, Schutterwald
- President: David Salameh
- League: Oberliga Baden-Württemberg (4th tier)

Turn- und Sportverein Schutterwald is a German multisports club based in Schutterwald, Baden-Württemberg. It is most famous for its handball club, which has played in the Handball-Bundesliga for several seasons.

== History ==
TuS Schutterwald was founded in 1900 in the Guesthause 'Adler' with 32 members. In 1924 the club began playing handball unofficially. In 1928 the official handball department was founded. The athletics department was founded in 1954, but was made a separate club in 1979.

=== Handball ===
In the 1950's the handball team won the Baden championships. In 1987-88 the team came second in the second tier and lost out on promotion to the Handball-Bundesliga.

In 1987 and 1989 they reached the semifinal of the DHB-Pokal.

In 1996 the club was promoted for the first time in club history, but only managed to stay up for a season. In 1997-98 they were promoted again, earning them the nickname „Fahrstuhl-Mannschaft“ (Elevator team).

The team came into financial trouble due to the inability to find sponsors, and relegation was only avoided by TV Niederwürzbach having even bigger economic issues.

In the 2002-03 season the team finish last and was relegated. Prior to the 2005-2006 season the team released the entire playing squad due to not being able to pay them and the license was overtaken by TV Willstätt.

In the 2019-2020 season TuS Schutterwald played in the Oberliga Baden-Württemberg, the fourth tier of German Handball.

The women's team played were in 2023 promoted the 3. Liga, but they were relegated to the Regionalliga the season after.

== Famous players ==
- Magnus Andersson
- Matthias Aschenbroich
- Christian Heuberger
- Martin Heuberger
- Arnulf Meffle
- Oliver Roggisch
- Jens Tiedtke (SG Willstätt/Schutterwald)
- Peter Quarti
- Roger Kjendalen
