= Martin Heuberger =

German handball player and coach (born 1964)

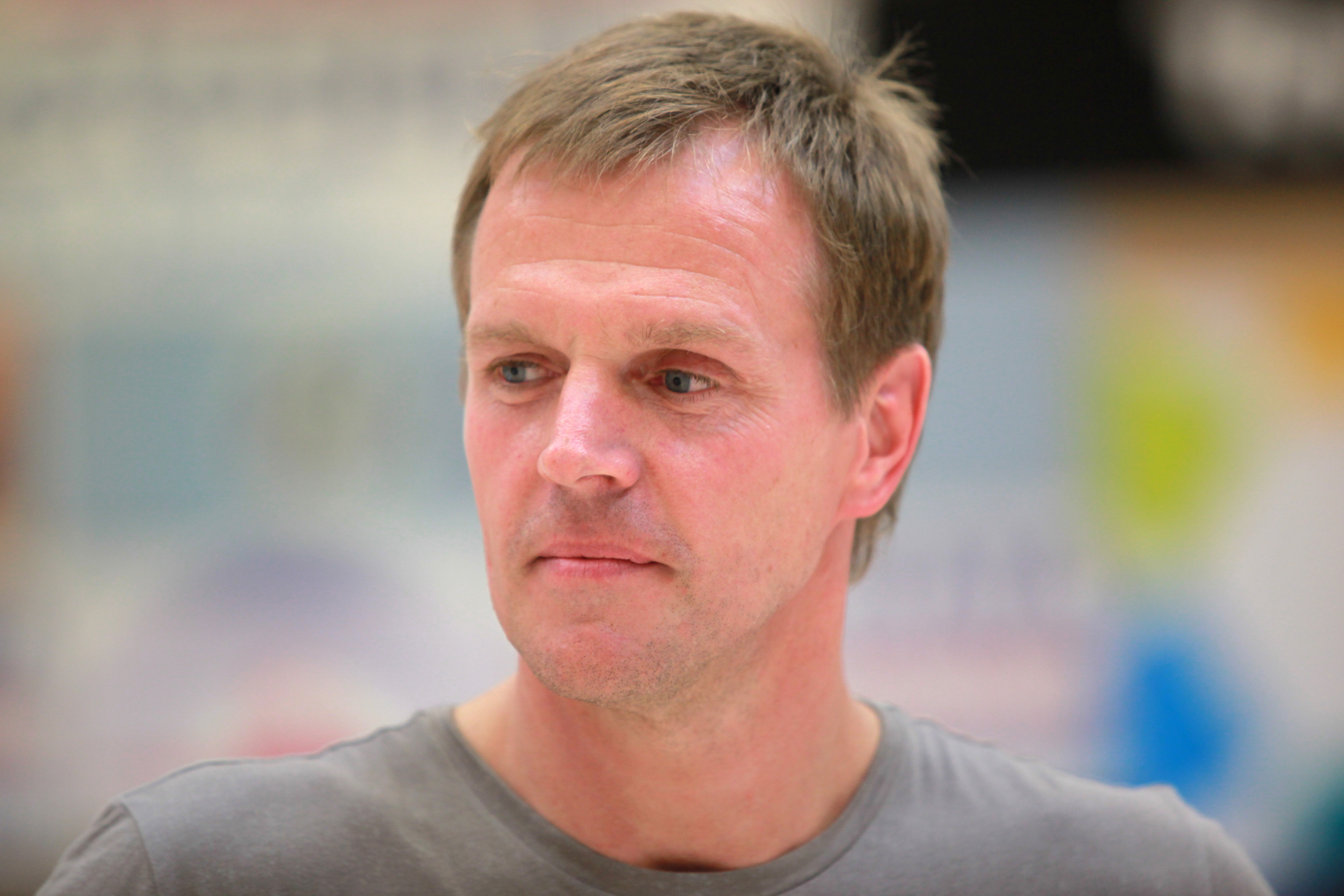

Personal information
- Nationality: German
- Born: 5 June 1964 (age 62) Schutterwald, West Germany
- Height: 1.93 m (6 ft 4 in)

Sport
- Sport: Handball
- Position: Pivot

Senior clubs
- Years: Team
- -1996: TuS Schutterwald
National team
Years	Team	Apps	(Gls)
1989–1991	Germany	26	(66)

Teams managed
- 1995–1999: TuS Schutterwald
- 2002–2011: Germany junior
- 2004–2011: Germany (assistant)
- 2011–2014: Germany
- 2017–: TuS Schutterwald (junior)
- 2018–: Germany junior

Martin Heuberger (born 5 June 1964) is a German handball coach and a former player. His playing career at the TuS Schutterwald was followed by a stint as player-coach and then coach at the club. Heuberger later coached the Germany men's national handball team.

== Life ==
Heuberger was born in Schutterwald and studied to become an administrator. Between 2014 and 2018 he worked in public administration in the district office in Offenburg

== Career ==
Heuberger played for the TuS Schutterwald, his home town handball club, playing 164 matches and scoring 314 goals in Bundesliga. From 1994, he was player-coach; in 1996 he was only coaching the TuS Schutterwald.

In 2004 he became assistant coach of the Germany men's national handball team under Heiner Brand. Between 2011 and 2014 he then served as head coach of the national team. At the 2013 World Championship he guided the team to a 5th place. After missing qualification for both the 2012 Olympics, 2014 European Championship and 2015 World Championship he did not get his contract extended, and had to leave the team on 30 June 2014. Since 2018, he has been full time coach of the junior national team.

== Success as player ==
Germany men's national handball team (1989-1991)

- 1990 C World Championship: bronze medal

== Success as coach ==
Germany men's national junior handball team (2002-2011)

- 2004: European Junior Champion
- 2006: European Junior Champion
- 2009: Junior World Champion
- 2011: Junior World Champion

Germany men's national handball team (assistant 2004-2011)

- 2006 European Championship: 5th place
- 2007 World Championship : World Champion
- 2008 European Championship: 4th place
- 2008 Summer Olympics: 9th place
- 2010 European Championship: 10th place
- 2011 World Championship: 11th place

Germany men's national handball team (main coach 2011-2014)

- 2012 European Championship: 7th place
- 2013 World Championship: 5th place
