= Stefan Drogrishki =

Macedonian handball player

Personal information
- Nationality: Macedonian
- Born: 9 September 1994 (age 32) Bitola, Macedonia
- Height: 1.93 m (6 ft 4 in)

Sport
- Sport: Handball
- Position: Left back
- Current club: GRK Ohrid
- Number: 10

Youth career
- Years: Team
- –: (North Macedonia) RK Pelister

Senior clubs
- Years: Team
- –2016: (North Macedonia) RK Pelister
- 2016–2017: (North Macedonia) RK Metalurg Skopje
- 2017–2018: (North Macedonia) RK Eurofarm Rabotnik
- 2018–2021: (North Macedonia) RK Eurofarm Pelister 2
- 2021–2022: (North Macedonia) GRK Tikveš
- 2023–2024: (North Macedonia) GRK Ohrid
- 2024–: (North Macedonia) RK Eurofarm Pelister 2
National team
| Years | Team | Apps | (Gls) |
| 2015– | Macedonia | 4 | (4) |

Stefan Drogrishki (Macedonian: Стефан Дрогришки; born 9 September 1994) is a Macedonian handball player who plays for GRK Ohrid and the Macedonian national team.
