= Ivan Dimitrovski =

Macedonian handball player

Personal information
- Nationality: Macedonian
- Born: 2 April 1998 (age 28) Bitola, Macedonia
- Height: 1.88 m (6 ft 2 in)

Sport
- Sport: Handball
- Position: Left wing
- Current club: RK Eurofarm Pelister 2
- Number: 9

Youth career
- Years: Team
- –: (North Macedonia) RK Pelister

Senior clubs
- Years: Team
- 2015–2016: (North Macedonia) RK Vardar II
- 2016–2018: (North Macedonia) RK Vardar Junior
- 2018–: (North Macedonia) RK Eurofarm Pelister 2

Ivan Dimitrovski (Macedonian: Иван Димитровски) (born 2 April 1998) is a Macedonian handball player who plays for RK Eurofarm Pelister 2.
