= Zvonko Šundovski =

Macedonian handball player

Personal information
- Nationality: Macedonian
- Born: 7 September 1967 (age 59) SR Macedonia

Sport
- Sport: Handball

Teams managed
- Years: Team
- 2003–2007: RK Pelister
- 2007–2009: RK Metalurg Skopje
- 2008–2010: Macedonia (assistant)
- 2010–2013: Macedonia
- 2012–2015: H.C.M. Constanța
- 2015–2017: CSM București
- 2017–2018: Israel
- 2018–2019: HC Dobrogea Sud
- 2020–2021: Al-Rayyan
- 2023–: RK Pelister (sporting director)
- 2024–: RK Pelister (interim)

Zvonko Šundovski (Macedonian: Звонко Шундовски) is a former Macedonian team handball player and a former coach of the North Macedonia National Handball Team. He was born on 7 September 1967 in Bitola, then in SFR Yugoslavia. Starting from October 2010, he served as the head coach of the Macedonia national team, and since the summer of 2012 he was also in charge of Romanian top division side HCM Constanța. From June 2015, he served as coach of Romanian club CSM București.

His first station as a coach was in 2003 with the club team RK Pelister, which he led to the double win of the national championship and cup. Already in 2006, Šundovski was coaching not only the men's junior national team but also the men's senior national team, whom he led in 2009 through their World Championship journey in Croatia. In the season 2008/09 Šundovski managed RK Metalurg Skopje and led the club as Macedonian champions into the EHF Champions League as well as round four of the EHF Cup Winners' Cup.

As team coach of Macedonia, Šundovski achieved 5th place in the 2012 European Men's Handball Championship in Serbia.

As of January 23, 2013, Šundovski is no longer a coach of the Macedonia National Handball Team. He resigned with a statement to the press, and an official email to the Macedonian Handball Federation in which he explained his leaving from the function. He took full responsibility for the low performance of the Macedonia National Handball Team at the 2013 World Men's Handball Championship in Spain.

== Clubs ==
=== Head coach ===
- 2003–2007: RK Pelister: Macedonian League
- 2007–2009: RK Metalurg Skopje: Macedonian League
- 2012–2015: H.C.M. Constanța: Romanian League
- 2015–2017: CSM București: Romanian League
- 2018–2019: HC Dobrogea Sud: Romanian League
- 2020–2021: Al-Rayyan: Qatar Handball League

== Head coaching career with national teams ==
- 2006–2008: Macedonia junior national handball team
- 2008–2010: Macedonia (assistant)
- 2010–2013: Macedonia
- 2017–2018: Israel

== Championships and cups as head coach ==
=== National domestic league championships won ===
- Macedonian Super League season 2004/2005 – RK Pelister
- Romanian Liga Nationala season 2011/2012 – HCM Constanta
- Romanian Liga Nationala season 2012/2013 – HCM Constanta
- Romanian Liga Nationala season 2013/2014 – HCM Constanta
- Macedonian Super League season 2022/2023 - RK Eurofarm Pelister

=== National domestic cup championships won ===
- Macedonian Cup season 2004/2005 – RK Pelister
- Macedonian Cup season 2008/2009 – RK Metalurg Skopje
- Romanian Cup season 2011/2012 HCM Constanta
- Romanian Cup season 2012/2013 HCM Constanta
- Romanian Cup season 2013/2014 HCM Constanta
- Romanian Cup season 2015/2016 CSM Bucuresti

=== National domestic super cup championships won ===
- Romanian Super Cup season 2012/2013 HCM Constanta
- Romanian Super Cup season 2013/2014 HCM Constanta

== Individual honours ==
- Best handball coach of North Macedonia for the year 2005-2006
- Best young coach of the year of North Macedonia (in all sports) 2007- 2008
- Most successful handball coach in North Macedonia, for the year 2009
- Most successful sports worker in Municipality of Bitola for the year 2011
- The most successful head coach of the National selections in North Macedonia for the year 2011
- Special Merit Medal from the President of the Republic of North Macedonia for achieved results on International level. Year 2012
- Best Handball Coach of Romania, for the season 2013/2014, as HCM Constanta makes history with the placement in the Final Four of EHF Cup in Berlin, and HCM Constanta wins the National Championship, National Cup and Super Cup of Romania. First time in the History of Romanian Handball this merit goes to International Coach.
