= Vladimir Temelkov =

Macedonian handball player

Personal information
- Full name: Vladimir Temelkov
- Nationality: Macedonian
- Born: 26 March 1980 (age 46) Titov Veles, SR Macedonia, SFR Yugoslavia
- Height: 1.86 m (6 ft 1 in)

Sport
- Sport: Handball
- Position: Right wing
- Current club: (Luxembourg) Handball Käerjeng
- Number: 2

Senior clubs
- Years: Team
- 1998-2003: (North Macedonia) RK Pelister
- 2003-2005: (Germany) VfL Pfullingen
- 2005-2008: (Germany) Willstätt-Ortenau
- 2008-2009: (Germany) Balingen-Weilstetten
- 2009-2011: (Germany) HR Ortenau
- 2011-: (Luxembourg) Handball Käerjeng
National team
Years	Team	Apps	(Gls)
–	Macedonia	78	(243)
- Updated on 29 January 2012

Vladimir Temelkov (Macedonian: Владимир Темелков; born 26 March 1980 in Titov Veles) is a Macedonian handball player who plays for Handball Käerjeng.

In 2009 Vladimir was a member of the Macedonian national handball team which finished 11th on the 2009 World Men's Handball Championship in Croatia and he scored 35 goals. Three years later in 2012 he played on the European Men's Handball Championship in Serbia when Macedonian national handball team finished 5th.

For the Macedonian national handball team he played 78 matches and scored 243 goals.
