= Filip Lazarov =

Macedonian handball player

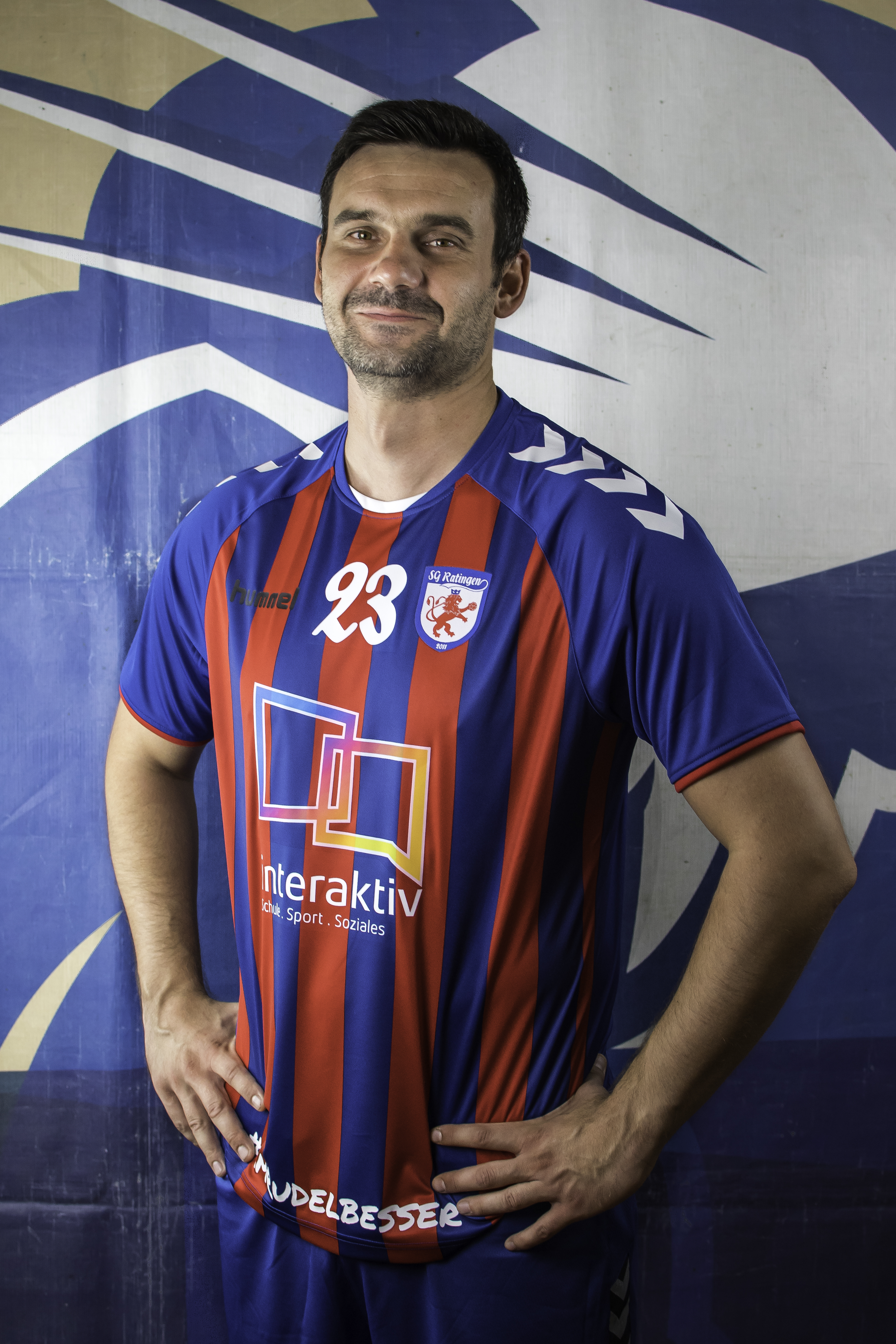

Personal information
- Nationality: Macedonian
- Born: 21 April 1985 (age 41) Sveti Nikole, SR Macedonia, SFR Yugoslavia
- Height: 1.97 m (6 ft 6 in)

Sport
- Sport: Handball
- Position: Left back
- Current club: Düsseldorf-Ratingen (manager)

Senior clubs
- Years: Team
- 2003–2006: RK Metalurg Skopje
- 2006–2007: PLER KC
- 2007–2011: RK Metalurg Skopje
- 2011: RK Pelister
- 2011–2016: RK Vardar
- 2016–2017: Poli Timişoara
- 2017: RK Pelister
- 2017–2018: Beşiktaş
- 2018–2021: SG Ratingen 2011
National team
Years	Team	Apps	(Gls)
–	Macedonia	77	(140)

Teams managed
- 2021–2022: Düsseldorf-Ratingen (Ass)
- 2022–: Düsseldorf-Ratingen

Filip Lazarov (Macedonian: Филип Лазаров; born 21 April 1985) is a retired Macedonian handball player.

== Career ==
=== Club ===
Previously played for Macedonian clubs Metalurg Skopje and Pelister Bitola, as well as for Hungarian PLER KC. The 1.99 m tall and 100 kg right-hander began his professional career in 2003 with the Macedonian club RK Metalurg Skopje, with whom he won the championship and cup in 2006.

After a season with the Hungarian club PLER KC in Budapest, he returned to Metalurg in 2007. He won the title again in 2008, 2010, and 2011, as well as the cup in 2009, 2010, and 2011. Internationally, he reached the quarterfinals of the 2007/08 EHF Cup and the 2008/09 EHF Cup Winners' Cup.

For the 2011/12 season, he moved to RK Pelister Bitola. However, after a short time, he joined rivals RK Vardar. With Vardar, he won the championship in 2013, 2015, and 2016, as well as the cup in 2012, 2014, 2015, and 2016. He also won the SEHA League in 2012 and 2014. In the 2013-14 EHF Champions League, he eliminated defending champions HSV Hamburg in the round of 16, but was then eliminated in the quarterfinals on away goals by SG Flensburg-Handewitt.

In the summer of 2016 he moved to the Romanian first division club SCM Politehnica Timișoara. From the 2018/19 season, he played for SG Ratingen.

=== National team ===
Filip Lazarov was a member of the Macedonian national team. He finished 11th at the 2009 World Cup, fifth at the 2012 European Championship, 14th at the 2013 World Cup, 9th at the 2015 World Cup, 11th at the 2016 European Championship, 15th at the 2017 World Cup, 11th at the 2018 European Championship, and 15th at the 2019 World Cup. By 2019, he had made 77 international appearances, scoring 140 goals.

== Coaching ==
He is currently the coach of Düsseldorf-Ratingen.

== Personal ==
Filip is the younger brother of Kiril Lazarov.

== Trophies ==
Lazarov has won 9 national championships and 10 national cup and 2 supercup tournaments for three different clubs. In international club tournaments, his best results are two times championship winner.

- Macedonian Champions (North Macedonia)
- Metalurg (4) 2006, 2008, 2010, 2011
- Vardar (3) 2013, 2015, 2016
- Macedonian Cup (North Macedonia)
- Metalurg (4) 2006, 2009, 2010, 2011
- Vardar (4) 2012, 2014, 2015, 2016
- Macedonian SEHA (North Macedonia)
- Vardar (2) 2012, 2014
- Turkish Champions (Turkey)
- Beşiktaş (2) 2017, 2018
- Turkish Cup (Turkey)
- Beşiktaş (2) 2017, 2018
- Turkish Super Cup (Turkey)
- Beşiktaş (2) 2017, 2018
