= Oliver Roggisch =

German handball player (born 1978)

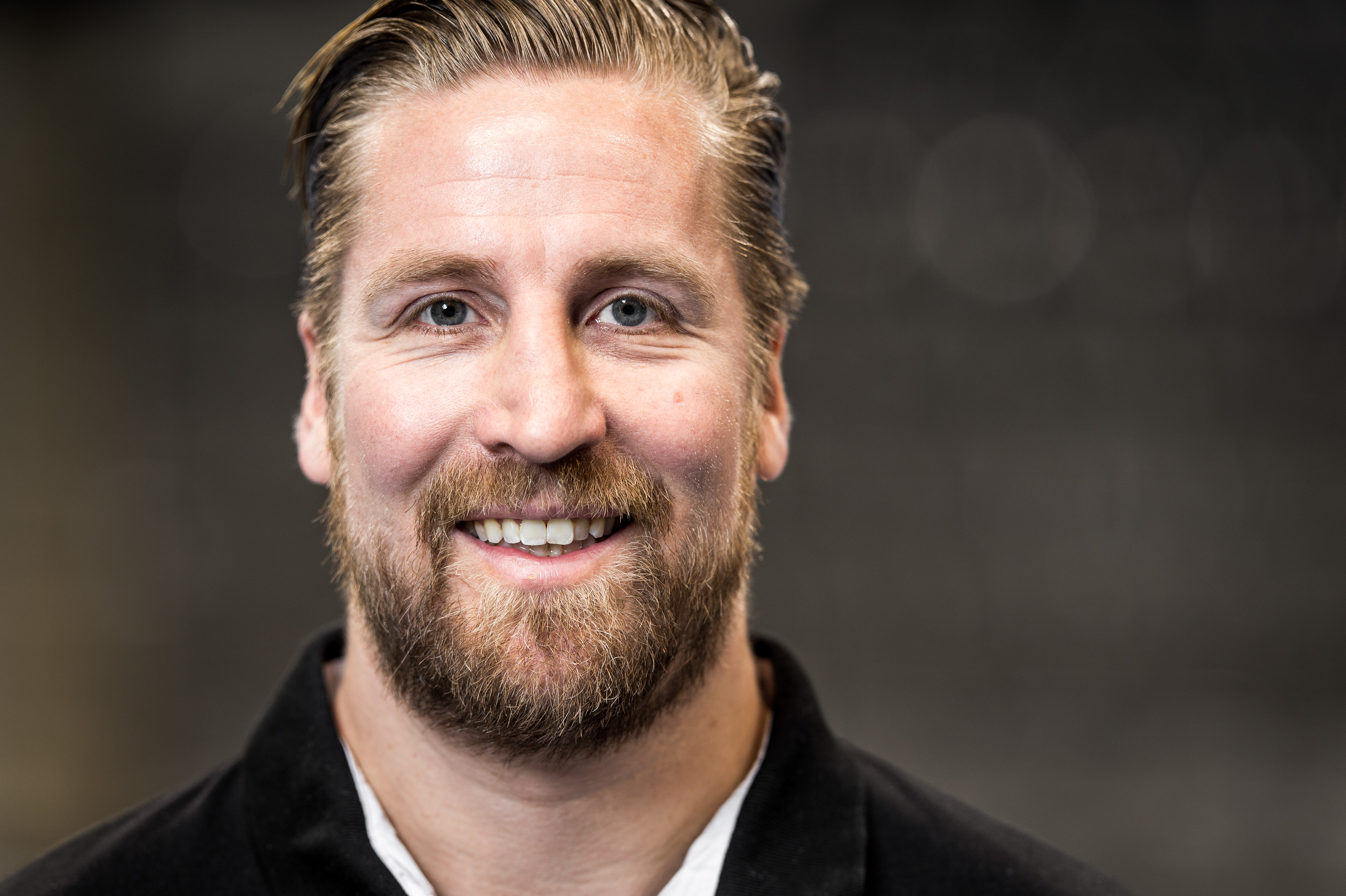
- Oliver Roggisch (2018)

Personal information
- Nationality: German
- Born: 25 August 1978 (age 48) Villingen-Schwenningen, Germany
- Height: 2.02 m (6 ft 8 in)

Sport
- Sport: Handball
- Position: Pivot

Senior clubs
- Years: Team
- 1998–2000: TuS Schutterwald
- 2000–2002: Frisch Auf Göppingen
- 2002–2005: TUSEM Essen
- 2005-2007: SC Magdeburg
- 2007-2014: Rhein-Neckar Löwen
National team
Years	Team	Apps	(Gls)
2002-2014	Germany	205	(48)

Teams managed
- 2014–2016: Rhein-Neckar Löwen (assistant)
Medal record
Representing Germany
World championship
Gold medal – first place	2007 Germany	Team Competition

Oliver Roggisch (born 25 August 1978 in Villingen-Schwenningen) is a retired German team handball player and coach. He is the sporting director for the Löwen and the German national team. Roggisch is a World champion from 2007 with the German national team. He participated for the German team that finished fourth at the 2008 European Men's Handball Championship.

== Club player ==
Roggisch started his career at TuS Schutterwald. He then played for Frisch Auf Göppingen and TUSEM Essen. In 2005 he joined SC Magdeburg, where he won the EHF Cup in 2007. He following summer he joined Rhein-Neckar Löwen on a three year deal. He played at the club until his retirement in 2014.

With 497 suspensions he has the second most in Bundesliga history only trailing Volker Zerbe.

In 2007 he won the 2007 World Championship, for which he was awarded the Silbernes Lorbeerblatt.

== Coaching career ==
After he had announced his retirement Roggisch became the assistant coach to Nikolaj Bredahl Jacobsen the following season. He stopped in this position in March 2016.

In addition to his position at RNL position he has also been the team manager for the German national team.
