= TJ Štart Nové Zámky =

Slovakian handball club

MHC Štart Nové Zámky
- Full name: Mestský hádzanársky klub Štart Nové Zámky
- Short name: Štart
- Founded: 1961
- Arena: Športová hala Milénium, Nové Zámky
- Capacity: 1,194
- President: Emil Mokryš
- Head coach: Ján Kolesár
- League: Niké Handball Extraliga
- Club colours
Home	Away

MHC Štart Nové Zámky is a handball club from Nové Zámky, Slovakia, that plays in the Niké Handball Extraliga.

Location of MHC Štart Nové Zámky

== Crest, colours, supporters ==
=== Kit manufacturers ===
Period	Kit manufacturer
– 2017	(Germany) Adidas
2017–present	(Japan) Mizuno

=== Kits ===
HOME
2014–15	2015–16	2016–17	2018–20

AWAY
2015–16	2016–17	2019–20

== Sports Hall information ==
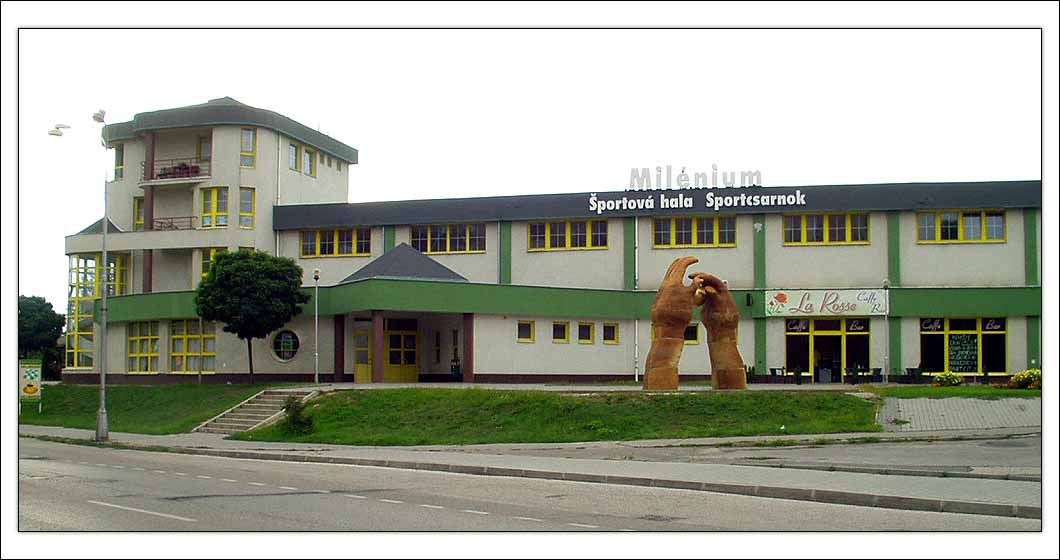
Home hall: Športová hala Milénium

- Name: – Športová hala Milénium
- City: – Nové Zámky
- Capacity: – 1194
- Address: – Jiráskova ul. 25, 940 01 Nové Zámky, Slovakia

== Management ==
Position	Name
President	(Slovakia) Emil Mokryš

== Team ==
=== Current squad ===
Squad for the 2022–23 season

MHC Štart Nové Zámky

Goalkeepers

- 1 (Slovakia) Marek Pavlovič (c)
- 16 (Slovakia) Filip Kocák
- 74 (Slovakia) Michal Meluš
- 75 (Slovakia) Christopher Bako

Left Wingers

- 28 (Slovakia) Filip Juhás
- 90 (Slovakia) Marek Tilandy

Right Wingers

- 7 (Slovakia) Patrik Illés
- 14 (Slovakia) Tomáš Dévai

Line Players

- 3 (Slovakia) Matúš Kocák
- 26 (Slovakia) Andrej Salgó

Central Backs

- 4 (Slovakia) Jakub Krajčír
- 15 (Slovakia) Daniel Magdolen
- 18 (Slovakia) Gabriel Vadkerti

Left Backs

- 5 (Slovakia) Fabien Katona
- 22 (Slovakia) Adam Lukačín
- 25 (Slovakia) Martin Lužica

Right Backs

- 6 (Slovakia) Samuel Demčák
- 17 (Slovakia) Patrik Molnár
- 24 (Slovakia) Mikuláš Kucsera

=== Technical staff ===
- Head coach: (Slovakia) Ján Kolesár
- Assistant coach: (Slovakia) Atilla Oros
- Physiotherapist: (Slovakia) Marián Tašký
- Club doctor: (Slovakia) Dr. Anton Vojna

=== Transfers ===
Transfers for the 2022–23 season

Joining

Leaving

== Previous Squads ==
2019–2020 Team
Shirt No	Nationality	Player	Birth Date	Position
1	Slovakia	Marek Pavlovič	10 August 1995 (age 31)	Goalkeeper
3	Slovakia	Matúš Kocák	14 October 1993 (age 33)	Line Player
4	Slovakia	Tomáš Tschur	16 May 1988 (age 38)	Central Back
10	Slovakia	Vojtech Gyurics	6 December 1995 (age 30)	Right Winger
11	Slovakia	Ernest Masaryk	12 June 1980 (age 46)	Left Back
16	Slovakia	Filip Kocák	14 October 1993 (age 33)	Goalkeeper
18	Slovakia	Gabriel Vadkerti	4 January 1985 (age 41)	Central Back
21	Slovakia	Gabriel Hricišon	16 February 1991 (age 35)	Right Back
22	Slovakia	Tomáš Straňovský	29 September 1980 (age 46)	Right Winger
23	Slovakia	Adam Veréb	11 November 1999 (age 26)	Central Back
25	Slovakia	Filip Ficza	25 June 1996 (age 30)	Central Back
26	Slovakia	Andrej Salgó	1 December 2000 (age 25)	Line Player
28	Slovakia	Filip Juhás	7 March 2001 (age 25)	Left Winger
30	Slovakia	Peter Košc	5 February 1993 (age 33)	Goalkeeper
31	Slovakia	Pavel Chovan	12 March 1999 (age 27)	Left Back
32	Slovakia	Samuel Kováč	30 April 2003 (age 23)	Central Back
38	Hungary	Nándor Fekete	18 July 1997 (age 29)	Left Back
74	Slovakia	Michal Meluš	17 April 1974 (age 52)	Goalkeeper
77	Ukraine	Yevhen Rakatynets	10 January 1992 (age 34)	Right Back
90	Slovakia	Marek Tilandy	28 April 1996 (age 30)	Left Winger

== Former club members ==
=== Notable former players ===
- (Slovakia) Oliver Rábek (2005–2012)
- (Slovakia) Martin Straňovský (2001–2005)
- (Slovakia) Tomáš Straňovský (1998–2001, 2011–2021)
