= Vlatko Mitkov =

Macedonian handball player

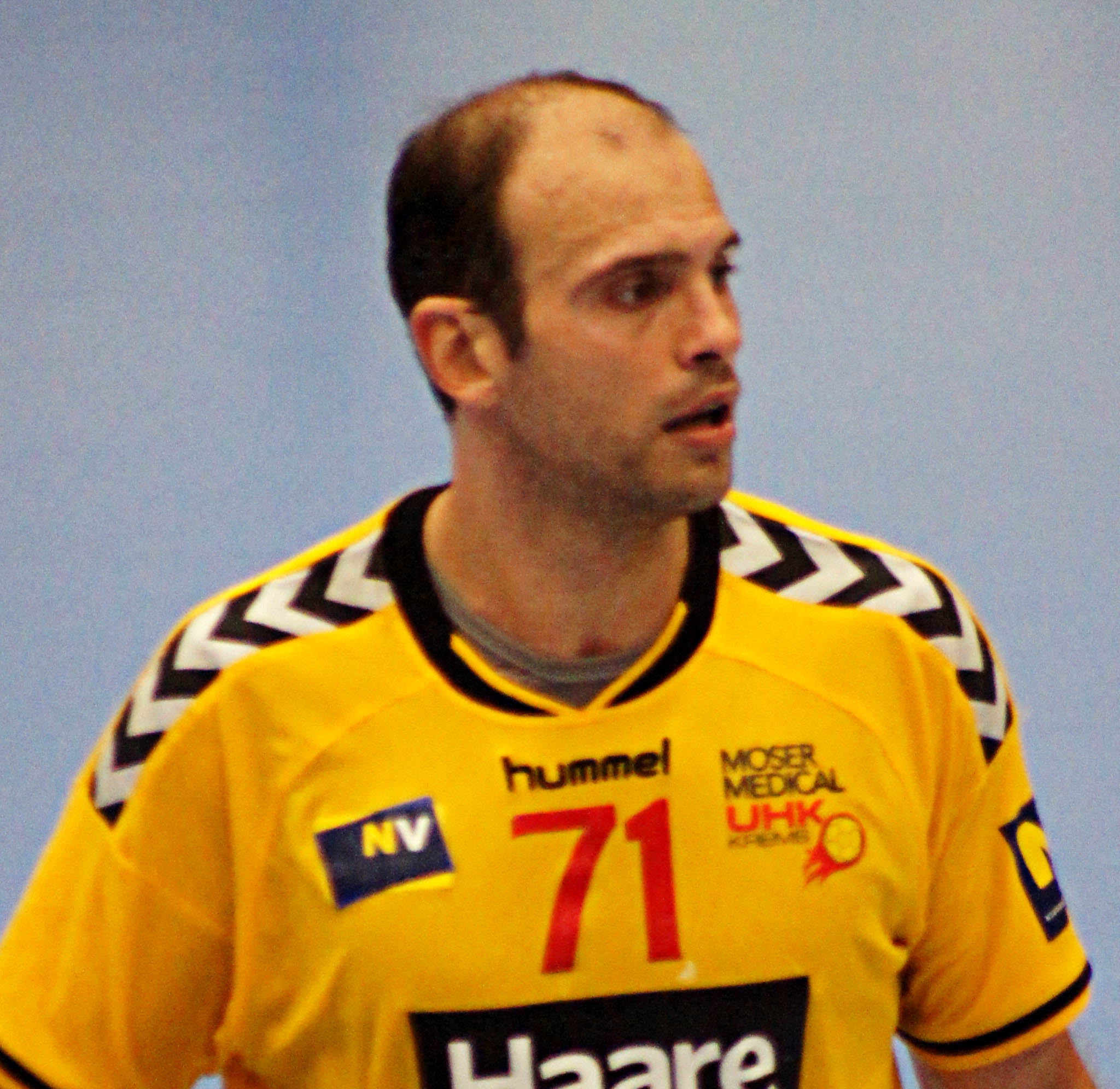

Personal information
- Nationality: Macedonian
- Born: 16 August 1981 (age 45) Štip, SR Macedonia, SFR Yugoslavia
- Height: 1.92 m (6 ft 3 1/2 in)

Sport
- Sport: Handball
- Position: Right back
- Current club: UHK Krems
- Number: 71

Senior clubs
- Years: Team
- 2000–2003: RK Pelister
- 2003–2006: Willstätt/Schutterwald
- 2006–2008: HSG Wetzlar
- 2008–2010: ASV Hamm
- 2010–2011: Balingen-Weilstetten
- 2011–2012: HSG Bärnbach/Köflach
- 2012–2018: UHK Krems
- 2018–2020: Bregenz Handball
- 2020–: UHC Hollabrunn
National team
| Years | Team | Apps | (Gls) |
| –2017 | Macedonia | 91 | (78) |

Vlatko Mitkov (Macedonian: Влатко Митков) (born 16 August 1981) is a Macedonian handball player who plays for UHK Krems.
