= Schutterwald =

- Municipality
- Coat of arms

- Location of Schutterwald within Ortenaukreis district
- Interactive map of Schutterwald
- Location within Germany Location within Baden-Württemberg
- Coordinates: 48°27′30″N 07°52′59″E
- Country: Germany
- State: Baden-Württemberg
- Admin. region: Freiburg
- District: Ortenaukreis

Government
  - Mayor (2019–27): Martin Holschuh

Area
  - Total: 21.04 km^{2} (8.12 sq mi)
- Elevation: 151 m (495 ft)

Population (2025-12-31)
  - Total: 7,354
  - Density: 349.5/km^{2} (905.3/sq mi)
- Time zone: UTC+01:00 (CET)
  - Summer (DST): UTC+02:00 (CEST)
- Postal codes: 77746
- Dialling codes: 0781
- Vehicle registration: OG, BH, KEL, LR, WOL
- Website: www.schutterwald.de

Schutterwald (German pronunciation: [ˈʃʊtɐvalt]) is a municipality in the district of Ortenau in Baden-Württemberg in Germany.
