= 2022–23 Gyöngyösi KK season =

HE-DO B. Braun Gyöngyös
2022–23 season
- President: Attila Nagy
- Head coach: (Hungary) Balázs Bíró
- Nemzeti Bajnokság I: -
- Hungarian Cup: Pre-season
Home colours	Away colours
- All statistics correct as of 11 September 2022.

The 2022–23 season of Gyöngyösi KK (known as HE-DO B. Braun Gyöngyös for sponsorship reasons) was the 12th consecutive season in the top flight of Hungarian handball. The club will participate in Nemzeti Bajnokság I and the Magyar Kupa.

== Players ==
=== Squad information ===
Squad for the 2022–23 season.
As of 11 September 2022

Goalkeepers

- 12 (Serbia) Aleksandar Tomić
- 16 (Hungary) László Bartucz
- 32 (Hungary) Barnabás Gyánti

Left Wingers

- 15 (Hungary) Milán Varsandán
- 45 (Hungary) Bercel Gyallai
- 95 (Hungary) Máté Menyhárt

Right Wingers

- 20 (Hungary) Máté Gábori
- 21 (Hungary) Máté Lakosy

Line Players

- 19 (Hungary) Márk Hegedűs
- 26 (Hungary) Tibor Gerdán (c)
- 57 (Hungary) Norbert Jóga

Left Backs

- 7 (Hungary) Dávid Nkousa
- 10 (Hungary) Levente Halász
- 51 (Bosnia and Herzegovina) Dino Hamidović

Central Backs

- 9 (Slovakia) Martin Potisk
- 24 (Hungary) Péter Schmid
- 55 (Hungary) Martin Gráf

Right Backs

- 11 (Hungary) Olivér Jaros
- 18 (Croatia) Lucian Bura
- 44 (Hungary) Zsolt Schäffer

=== Transfers ===
Source: Rajt a K&H férfi ligában

IN

- (Hungary) László Bartucz (from (Hungary) Tatabánya)
- (Croatia) Lucian Bura (from (Croatia) Gorica)
- (Hungary) Norbert Jóga (from (Hungary) Komlói BSK)
- (Hungary) Máté Lakosy (from (Hungary) ETO-SZESE Győr)
- (Hungary) Máté Menyhárt (from (Hungary) Kecskemét)
- (Slovakia) Martin Potisk (from (Germany) ThSV Eisenach)
- (Hungary) Zsolt Schäffer (from (Hungary) Csurgó)
- (Hungary) Péter Schmid (from (Hungary) Budakalász)
- Head coach: (Hungary) Balázs Bíró (from (Hungary) Salgótarján)

OUT

- (Slovakia) Ľubomír Ďuriš (to (Slovakia) MŠK Považská Bystrica)
- (Hungary) (United States) Pál Merkovszki (to (Hungary) Budai Farkasok)
- (Serbia) Mitar Markez (to (Hungary) Csurgó)
- (Hungary) Benedek Nagy (loan to (Hungary) Tatabánya)
- (Hungary) Bence Papp (to (Hungary) Budakalász)
- (Hungary) Dávid Ubornyák (to (Hungary) Tatabánya)
- (Hungary) (Serbia) Uroš Vilovski (to (Hungary) Tatabánya)
- (Hungary) (Serbia) Marko Vasić (to (Serbia) Vojvodina)
- (Hungary) Bálint Rosta (loan to (Hungary) ETO-SZESE Győr)

=== Staff members ===
Source: Staff - Szakmai stáb 2022-2023

- Head Coach: Balázs Bíró
- Assistant Coach: Ákos Sándor
- Goalkeeping Coach: Henrik Hudák
- Fitness Coach: Tamás Németh
- Club Doctor: János Szívós MD
- Masseur: Balázs Unger

== Club ==
=== Management ===
Source: Management (Elnökség)

Position	Staff member
President	Attila Nagy
Member of the Board	Péter Juhász
Member of the Board	Sándor Kocsis
Member of the Board	Mihály Erdei
Member of the Board	Csaba Gáspár
Member of the Board	Attila Zakar
Member of the Board	István Rosta

=== Uniform ===
- Supplier: hummel
- Shirt sponsor (front): B. Braun / tippmix / HE-DO / Kedvenc Kereskedőház / K&V
- Shirt sponsor (back): City of Gyöngyös
- Shorts sponsor: Crossgym Gemmeopolis / MÁTRAKÖZMŰ Mélyépítő Kft. / tippmix

== Competitions ==
Times up to 30 October 2022 and from 26 March 2023 are CEST (UTC+2). Times from 30 October 2022 to 26 March 2023 are CET (UTC+1).

Win Draw Loss

=== Overview ===
Competition	First match	Last match	Starting round	Final position	Record							
Competition	First match	Last match	Starting round	Final position	Pld	W	D	L	GF	GA	GD	Win %
Nemzeti Bajnokság I	3 September 2022	-	Matchday 1	-	2	1	1	0	49	44	+5	50.00
Magyar Kupa	-	-	Fourth round	-	0	0	0	0	0	0	+0	—
Total					2	1	1	0	49	44	+5	50.00

Last updated: 11 September 2022
Source: Flashscore

=== Nemzeti Bajnokság I ===
==== Regular season ====
===== Results by round =====
Round	1	2	3	4	5	6	7	8	9	10	11	12	13	14	15	16	17	18	19	20	21	22	23	24	25	26
Ground	H	A	H	A	A	H	A	H	A	H	A	H	A	A	H	A	H	H	A	H	A	H	A	H	A	H
Result	W	D	W	L	L																					

Updated to match(es) played on 13 September 2022. Source: Matches
A = Away; H = Home; W = Win; D = Draw; L = Loss; C = Cancelled

===== Matches =====
The league fixtures were announced on 5 July 2022.

Round 1; 3 September 2022; 18:00	HE-DO B. Braun Gyöngyös	25–20	HÉP-Cegléd	Dr. Fejes András Sport- és Rendezvénycsarnok, Gyöngyös; Attendance: 1,000; Referees: Fekete, Tóth
Round 1; 3 September 2022; 18:00	Bura, Lakosy 4	(14–8)	Kállai 4	Dr. Fejes András Sport- és Rendezvénycsarnok, Gyöngyös; Attendance: 1,000; Referees: Fekete, Tóth
Round 1; 3 September 2022; 18:00	2× (yellow card) 4× (suspension) 2× (red card)	Report	1× (yellow card) 5× (suspension)	Dr. Fejes András Sport- és Rendezvénycsarnok, Gyöngyös; Attendance: 1,000; Referees: Fekete, Tóth

Round 2; 9 September 2022; 18:00	Balatonfüredi KSE	24–24	HE-DO B. Braun Gyöngyös	Szabadidőközpont, Balatonfüred; Attendance: 400; Referees: Hargitai, Markó
Round 2; 9 September 2022; 18:00	Szöllősi 5	(11–10)	Bura 6	Szabadidőközpont, Balatonfüred; Attendance: 400; Referees: Hargitai, Markó
Round 2; 9 September 2022; 18:00	2× (yellow card) 5× (suspension)	Report	2× (yellow card) 7× (suspension)	Szabadidőközpont, Balatonfüred; Attendance: 400; Referees: Hargitai, Markó

Round 3; 17 September 2022; 18:00	HE-DO B. Braun Gyöngyös	24–23	Dabas KC	Dr. Fejes András Sport- és Rendezvénycsarnok, Gyöngyös; Attendance: 900; Referees: Horváth, Marton
Round 3; 17 September 2022; 18:00	Potisk 6	(14–13)	three players 4	Dr. Fejes András Sport- és Rendezvénycsarnok, Gyöngyös; Attendance: 900; Referees: Horváth, Marton
Round 3; 17 September 2022; 18:00	1× (yellow card) 3× (suspension)	Report	1× (yellow card) 3× (suspension)	Dr. Fejes András Sport- és Rendezvénycsarnok, Gyöngyös; Attendance: 900; Referees: Horváth, Marton

Round 4; 23 September 2022; 18:00	Ferencvárosi TC	41–28	HE-DO B. Braun Gyöngyös	Elek Gyula Aréna, Budapest; Attendance: 500; Referees: Altmár, Horváth
Round 4; 23 September 2022; 18:00	Nagy, Bujdosó 7	(22–13)	Bura 8	Elek Gyula Aréna, Budapest; Attendance: 500; Referees: Altmár, Horváth
Round 4; 23 September 2022; 18:00	1× (yellow card) 3× (suspension) 1× (red card)	Report	2× (yellow card) 2× (suspension)	Elek Gyula Aréna, Budapest; Attendance: 500; Referees: Altmár, Horváth

Round 5; 1 October 2022; 18:00	Telekom Veszprém	39–30	HE-DO B. Braun Gyöngyös	Veszprém Aréna, Veszprém; Attendance: 1,000; Referees: Hajdu, Halász
Round 5; 1 October 2022; 18:00	Ilic 5	(20–16)	Varsandán 7	Veszprém Aréna, Veszprém; Attendance: 1,000; Referees: Hajdu, Halász
Round 5; 1 October 2022; 18:00	2× (yellow card) 2× (suspension) 1× (red card)	Report	6× (suspension)	Veszprém Aréna, Veszprém; Attendance: 1,000; Referees: Hajdu, Halász

Round 6; 22 October 2022; 18:00	HE-DO B. Braun Gyöngyös	–	MOL Tatabánya KC	Dr. Fejes András Sport- és Rendezvénycsarnok, Gyöngyös
Round 6; 22 October 2022; 18:00		(–)		Dr. Fejes András Sport- és Rendezvénycsarnok, Gyöngyös
Round 6; 22 October 2022; 18:00		Report		Dr. Fejes András Sport- és Rendezvénycsarnok, Gyöngyös

Round 7; 29 October 2022; 18:00	Pick Szeged	–	HE-DO B. Braun Gyöngyös	Pick Aréna, Szeged
Round 7; 29 October 2022; 18:00		(–)		Pick Aréna, Szeged
Round 7; 29 October 2022; 18:00		Report		Pick Aréna, Szeged

Round 8; 5 November 2022; 18:00	HE-DO B. Braun Gyöngyös	–	Fejér-B.Á.L. Veszprém	Dr. Fejes András Sport- és Rendezvénycsarnok, Gyöngyös
Round 8; 5 November 2022; 18:00		(–)		Dr. Fejes András Sport- és Rendezvénycsarnok, Gyöngyös
Round 8; 5 November 2022; 18:00		Report		Dr. Fejes András Sport- és Rendezvénycsarnok, Gyöngyös

Round 9; 12 November 2022; 18:00	HSA-NEKA	–	HE-DO B. Braun Gyöngyös	NEKA Sportcsarnok, Balatonboglár
Round 9; 12 November 2022; 18:00		(–)		NEKA Sportcsarnok, Balatonboglár
Round 9; 12 November 2022; 18:00		Report		NEKA Sportcsarnok, Balatonboglár

Round 10; 26 November 2022; 18:00	HE-DO B. Braun Gyöngyös	–	Budai Farkasok-Rév Group	Dr. Fejes András Sport- és Rendezvénycsarnok, Gyöngyös
Round 10; 26 November 2022; 18:00		(–)		Dr. Fejes András Sport- és Rendezvénycsarnok, Gyöngyös
Round 10; 26 November 2022; 18:00		Report		Dr. Fejes András Sport- és Rendezvénycsarnok, Gyöngyös

Round 11; 3 December 2022; 18:00	Csurgói KK	–	HE-DO B. Braun Gyöngyös	Sótonyi László Sportcsarnok, Csurgó
Round 11; 3 December 2022; 18:00		(–)		Sótonyi László Sportcsarnok, Csurgó
Round 11; 3 December 2022; 18:00		Report		Sótonyi László Sportcsarnok, Csurgó

Round 12; 9 December 2022; 18:00	HE-DO B. Braun Gyöngyös	–	Sport36-Komló	Dr. Fejes András Sport- és Rendezvénycsarnok, Gyöngyös
Round 12; 9 December 2022; 18:00		(–)		Dr. Fejes András Sport- és Rendezvénycsarnok, Gyöngyös
Round 12; 9 December 2022; 18:00		Report		Dr. Fejes András Sport- és Rendezvénycsarnok, Gyöngyös

Round 13; 17 December 2022; 17:00	CYEB-Budakalász	–	HE-DO B. Braun Gyöngyös	Sportcsarnok, Budakalász
Round 13; 17 December 2022; 17:00		(–)		Sportcsarnok, Budakalász
Round 13; 17 December 2022; 17:00		Report		Sportcsarnok, Budakalász

===== Results overview =====
Opposition	Home score	Away score	Double
Balatonfüredi KSE	18 Feb	24–24	-
Budai Farkasok-Rév Group	26 Nov	5 May	-
CYEB-Budakalász	27 May	17 Dec	-
HÉP-Cegléd	25–20	10 Feb	-
Csurgói KK	13 May	3 Dec	-
Dabas KK	24–23	25 Feb	-
Ferencvárosi TC	4 Mar	41–28	-
Sport36-Komló	9 Dec	20 May	-
HSA-NEKA	22 Apr	12 Nov	-
Pick Szeged	2 Apr	19 Oct	-
MOL Tatabánya KC	22 Oct	14 Apr	-
Telekom Veszprém	18 Mac	39–30	-
Fejér-B.Á.L. Veszprém	5 Nov	25 Mar	-

=== Magyar Kupa ===
Gyöngyös entered the tournament in the fourth round.

== Statistics ==
=== Top scorers ===
Includes all competitive matches. The list is sorted by shirt number when total goals are equal. Last updated on 18 September 2022.

Position	Nation	No.	Name	Hungarian League	Hungarian Cup	Total
1	(Croatia)	18	Lucian Bura	13	0	13
2	(Hungary)	15	Milán Varsandán	12	0	12
3	(Slovakia)	9	Martin Potisk	10	0	10
4	(Hungary)	10	Levente Halász	6	0	6
5	(Hungary)	19	Márk Hegedűs	6	0	6
6	(Hungary)	55	Martin Gráf	6	0	6
7	(Hungary)	21	Máté Lakosy	6	0	6
8	(Hungary)	44	Zsolt Schäffer	5	0	5
9	(Hungary)	57	Norbert Jóga	3	0	3
10	(Hungary)	24	Péter Schmid	3	0	3
11	(Bosnia and Herzegovina)	51	Dino Hamidović	3	0	3
			TOTALS	73	0	73
