= 2022–23 Tatabánya KC season =

MOL Tatabánya KC
2022–23 season
- President: László Marosi
- Head coach: (Hungary) Csaba Tombor
- Nemzeti Bajnokság I: -
- Hungarian Cup: Pre-season
Home colours	Away colours
- All statistics correct as of 2 September 2022.

The 2022–23 season was the 80th season in the history of Tatabánya KC (known as MOL Tatabánya KC for sponsorship reasons) and their 21st consecutive season in the top flight. The club will participate in Nemzeti Bajnokság I and the Magyar Kupa.

== Players ==
=== Squad information ===
Squad for the 2022–23 season.
As of 3 September 2022

Goalkeepers

- 1 (Hungary) Benedek Nagy
- 12 (Hungary) Márton Székely
- 16 (Hungary) Martin Perényi

Left Wingers

- 15 (Spain) Cristian Ugalde
- 33 (Hungary) Olivér Edwards

Right Wingers

- 14 (Hungary) Bence Hornyák
- 26 (Hungary) (Spain) Pedro Rodríguez Álvarez

Line Players

- 11 (Hungary) (Croatia) Petar Topic
- 19 (Hungary) Kolen Krancz
- 23 (Hungary) (Serbia) Uroš Vilovski

Left Backs

- 10 (Serbia) Nemanja Obradović
- 17 (Hungary) Andrej Pergel
- 24 (Hungary) Márk Bodor

Central Backs

- 8 (Hungary) Dávid Ubornyák
- 9 (Bosnia and Herzegovina) Josip Perić
- 22 (Hungary) Mátyás Győri
- 44 (Hungary) Ádám Bodnár

Right Backs

- 2 (Croatia) Mateo Maraš
- 27 (Hungary) Gábor Ancsin (c)

=== Transfers ===
Source: Rajt a K&H férfi ligában

IN

- (Hungary) Benedek Nagy (loan from (Hungary) Veszprém)
- (Serbia) Nemanja Obradović (from (North Macedonia) Eurofarm Pelister)
- (Hungary) Andrej Pergel (loan from (Hungary) Veszprém)
- (Hungary) (Spain) Pedro Rodríguez Álvarez (from (Hungary) Balatonfüred)
- (Hungary) Márton Székely (from (North Macedonia) Eurofarm Pelister)
- (Bosnia and Herzegovina) Josip Perić (from (North Macedonia) Eurofarm Pelister)
- (Croatia) Mateo Maraš (from (North Macedonia) Eurofarm Pelister)
- (Hungary) (Croatia) Petar Topic (from (Hungary) Balatonfüred)
- (Hungary) Dávid Ubornyák (from (Hungary) Gyöngyös)
- (Spain) Cristian Ugalde (from (Greece) AEK Athens)
- (Hungary) (Serbia) Uroš Vilovski (from (Hungary) Gyöngyös)
- Head coach: (Hungary) Csaba Tombor (from (Hungary) Veszprém KKFT)

OUT

- (Hungary) Bence Bálint (to (Hungary) Dabas)
- (Hungary) Zsolt Balogh (to (Hungary) Ferencváros)
- (Hungary) László Bartucz (to (Hungary) Gyöngyös)
- (Hungary) Nándor Bognár (to (Hungary) Dabas)
- (Hungary) Dávid Fekete (?)
- (Romania) Viorel Fotache (to (Romania) Minaur Baia Mare)
- (Hungary) Péter Hornyák (to (Hungary) Balatonfüred)
- (Hungary) Ádám Juhász (to (Portugal) Benfica)
- (Slovakia) Lukáš Urban (to (Slovakia) Tatran Prešov)
- (Slovenia) Darko Stojnić (?)
- (Hungary) (Serbia) Stefan Sunajko (to (Serbia) Dinamo Pančevo)
- (Belarus) Aliaksei Ushal (to (Romania) Bacău)
- (Poland) Piotr Wyszomirski (to (Poland) Górnik Zabrze)
- (Hungary) Bence Zdolik (to (Hungary) Dabas)
- (Hungary) Barnabás Tóth (to (Hungary) Tatai AC)
- Head coach: (Serbia) Dragan Đukić

=== Staff members ===
Source: Team - Csapat MOL Tatabánya KC / 2022-2023

- Head Coach: Csaba Tombor
- Assistant Coach: Jakab Sibalin
- Goalkeeping Coach: (Bosnia and Herzegovina) Haris Porobić
- Fitness Coach: László Elek
- Physiotherapist: Róbert Radnai
- Club Doctor: Zoltán Csőkör MD
- Masseur: Jenő Flasch, Gyula Kovács, Mónika Kemény

== Club ==
=== Management ===
Source: Management (Klub / Munkatársak)

Position	Staff member
President	László Marosi
Executive director	Sándor Zoltán Németh
Club manager	Ferenc Ilyés
Technical manager	Zsolt Kontra
Economic affairs	Tibor Bognár
Chief financial officer	Kata Schmidt-Rembeczki
Technical director	Zsolt Kontra
International relations and Communication	Kata Székely-Marosi
Professional director responsible for youth	Gergely Szappanos
Sports employee responsible for youth	Ádám Kanyó
Sports employee responsible for youth	Helga Csiaki

=== Uniform ===
- Supplier: Jako
- Shirt sponsor (front): MOL / tippmix / Grundfos
- Shirt sponsor (back): Grundfos / City of Tatabánya
- Shirt sponsor (sleeves): Foxconn

== Pre-season ==
=== Friendly matches ===
29 July 2022	MOL-Tatabánya KC	28–23	HE-DO B. Braun Gyöngyös	Multifunkcionális Sportcsarnok, Tatabánya; Attendance: closed doors
29 July 2022	Ancsin 6	(16–12)		Multifunkcionális Sportcsarnok, Tatabánya; Attendance: closed doors
29 July 2022		Report		Multifunkcionális Sportcsarnok, Tatabánya; Attendance: closed doors

2 August 2022	NEKA	23–29	MOL-Tatabánya KC	NEKA Sportcsarnok, Balatonboglár; Attendance: 350
2 August 2022		(11–14)	Pedro 6	NEKA Sportcsarnok, Balatonboglár; Attendance: 350
2 August 2022		Report		NEKA Sportcsarnok, Balatonboglár; Attendance: 350

5 August 2022	MOL-Tatabánya KC	34–27	CYEB-Budakalász	Multifunkcionális Sportcsarnok, Tatabánya; Attendance: closed doors
5 August 2022	Pedro 8	(19–12)		Multifunkcionális Sportcsarnok, Tatabánya; Attendance: closed doors
5 August 2022		Report		Multifunkcionális Sportcsarnok, Tatabánya; Attendance: closed doors

11 August 2022	MOL-Tatabánya KC	25–27	(France) Dunkerque	NEKA Sportcsarnok, Balatonboglár; Attendance: closed doors
11 August 2022	Maraš 5	(14–14)		NEKA Sportcsarnok, Balatonboglár; Attendance: closed doors
11 August 2022		Report		NEKA Sportcsarnok, Balatonboglár; Attendance: closed doors

MOL Cup, Semi-final; 19 August 2022	MOL Tatabánya KC	31–26	(Croatia) PPD Zagreb	Multifunkcionális Sportcsarnok, Tatabánya
MOL Cup, Semi-final; 19 August 2022		(15–16)		Multifunkcionális Sportcsarnok, Tatabánya
MOL Cup, Semi-final; 19 August 2022		Report		Multifunkcionális Sportcsarnok, Tatabánya

MOL Cup, Final; 20 August 2022; 16:45	MOL Tatabánya KC	29–33	Telekom Veszprém	Multifunkcionális Sportcsarnok, Tatabánya; Attendance: 3,500; Referees: Horváth, Altmár
MOL Cup, Final; 20 August 2022; 16:45	Perić, Pedro 5	(15–15)	Nenadić 6	Multifunkcionális Sportcsarnok, Tatabánya; Attendance: 3,500; Referees: Horváth, Altmár
MOL Cup, Final; 20 August 2022; 16:45		Report		Multifunkcionális Sportcsarnok, Tatabánya; Attendance: 3,500; Referees: Horváth, Altmár

26 August 2022	MOL-Tatabánya KC	40–24	HÉP-Cegléd	Multifunkcionális Sportcsarnok, Tatabánya; Attendance: closed doors Referees: Felhő, Öcsi
26 August 2022	Hornyák 9	(18–12)		Multifunkcionális Sportcsarnok, Tatabánya; Attendance: closed doors Referees: Felhő, Öcsi
26 August 2022		Report		Multifunkcionális Sportcsarnok, Tatabánya; Attendance: closed doors Referees: Felhő, Öcsi

== Competitions ==
Times up to 30 October 2022 and from 26 March 2023 are CEST (UTC+2). Times from 30 October 2022 to 26 March 2023 are CET (UTC+1).

Win Draw Loss

=== Overview ===
Competition	First match	Last match	Starting round	Final position	Record							
Competition	First match	Last match	Starting round	Final position	Pld	W	D	L	GF	GA	GD	Win %
Nemzeti Bajnokság I	3 September 2022	-	Matchday 1	-	3	3	0	0	97	80	+17	100.00
Magyar Kupa	-	-	Fourth round	-	0	0	0	0	0	0	+0	—
Total					3	3	0	0	97	80	+17	100.00

Last updated: 18 September 2022
Source: Flashscore

=== Nemzeti Bajnokság I ===
==== Regular season ====
===== Results by round =====
Round	1	2	3	4	5	6	7	8	9	10	11	12	13	14	15	16	17	18	19	20	21	22	23	24	25	26
Ground	A	H	H	A	H	A	H	A	H	A	H	A	H	H	A	A	H	A	H	A	H	A	H	A	H	A
Result	W	W	W	L	W																					

Updated to match(es) played on 18 September 2022. Source: Matches
A = Away; H = Home; W = Win; D = Draw; L = Loss; C = Cancelled

===== Matches =====
The league fixtures were announced on 5 July 2022.

Round 1; 3 September 2022; 18:00	Budai Farkasok-Rév Group	25–32	MOL Tatabánya KC	Városi Uszoda és Sportcsarnok, Budaörs; Attendance: 700; Referees: Paska, Vastag
Round 1; 3 September 2022; 18:00	Rédai 5	(10–16)	Pedro 7	Városi Uszoda és Sportcsarnok, Budaörs; Attendance: 700; Referees: Paska, Vastag
Round 1; 3 September 2022; 18:00	2× (yellow card) 5× (suspension)	Report	1× (yellow card) 4× (suspension)	Városi Uszoda és Sportcsarnok, Budaörs; Attendance: 700; Referees: Paska, Vastag

Round 2; 10 September 2022; 14:10	MOL Tatabánya KC	37–30	Ferencvárosi TC	Multifunkcionális Sportcsarnok, Tatabánya; Attendance: 2,780; Referees: Bíró, Kiss
Round 2; 10 September 2022; 14:10	Perić 11	(15–16)	Kovacsics 6	Multifunkcionális Sportcsarnok, Tatabánya; Attendance: 2,780; Referees: Bíró, Kiss
Round 2; 10 September 2022; 14:10	1× (yellow card) 7× (suspension)	Report	1× (yellow card) 2× (suspension)	Multifunkcionális Sportcsarnok, Tatabánya; Attendance: 2,780; Referees: Bíró, Kiss

Round 3; 16 September 2022; 18:30	MOL Tatabánya KC	28–25	Csurgói KK	Multifunkcionális Sportcsarnok, Tatabánya; Attendance: 2,160; Referees: G. Kiu, T. Kiu
Round 3; 16 September 2022; 18:30	Pedro 8	(14–12)	Gábor 6	Multifunkcionális Sportcsarnok, Tatabánya; Attendance: 2,160; Referees: G. Kiu, T. Kiu
Round 3; 16 September 2022; 18:30	1× (yellow card) 4× (suspension)	Report	1× (yellow card) 4× (suspension) 1× (red card)	Multifunkcionális Sportcsarnok, Tatabánya; Attendance: 2,160; Referees: G. Kiu, T. Kiu

Round 4; 25 September 2022; 18:00	Telekom Veszprém	42–32	MOL Tatabánya KC	Veszprém Aréna, Veszprém; Attendance: 2,500; Referees: Bócz, Wiedemann
Round 4; 25 September 2022; 18:00	Elísson 10	(22–19)	Pedro 8	Veszprém Aréna, Veszprém; Attendance: 2,500; Referees: Bócz, Wiedemann
Round 4; 25 September 2022; 18:00	5× (suspension)	Report	7× (suspension)	Veszprém Aréna, Veszprém; Attendance: 2,500; Referees: Bócz, Wiedemann

Round 5; 30 September 2022; 18:00	MOL Tatabánya KC	26–22	Sport36-Komló	Multifunkcionális Sportcsarnok, Tatabánya; Attendance: 1,800; Referees: Rontó, Szanyi
Round 5; 30 September 2022; 18:00	Győri, Pedro 8	(17–6)	Melnicsuk 6	Multifunkcionális Sportcsarnok, Tatabánya; Attendance: 1,800; Referees: Rontó, Szanyi
Round 5; 30 September 2022; 18:00	7× (suspension)	Report	7× (suspension) 1× (red card)	Multifunkcionális Sportcsarnok, Tatabánya; Attendance: 1,800; Referees: Rontó, Szanyi

Round 6; 22 October 2022; 18:00	HE-DO B. Braun Gyöngyös	–	MOL Tatabánya KC	Dr. Fejes András Sport- és Rendezvénycsarnok, Gyöngyös
Round 6; 22 October 2022; 18:00		(–)		Dr. Fejes András Sport- és Rendezvénycsarnok, Gyöngyös
Round 6; 22 October 2022; 18:00		Report		Dr. Fejes András Sport- és Rendezvénycsarnok, Gyöngyös

Round 7; 28 October 2022; 18:30	MOL Tatabánya KC	–	CYEB-Budakalász	Multifunkcionális Sportcsarnok, Tatabánya
Round 7; 28 October 2022; 18:30		(–)		Multifunkcionális Sportcsarnok, Tatabánya
Round 7; 28 October 2022; 18:30		Report		Multifunkcionális Sportcsarnok, Tatabánya

Round 8; 6 November 2022; 18:00	Pick Szeged	–	MOL Tatabánya KC	Pick Aréna, Szeged
Round 8; 6 November 2022; 18:00		(–)		Pick Aréna, Szeged
Round 8; 6 November 2022; 18:00		Report		Pick Aréna, Szeged

Round 9; 11 November 2022; 18:30	MOL Tatabánya KC	–	HÉP-Cegléd	Multifunkcionális Sportcsarnok, Tatabánya
Round 9; 11 November 2022; 18:30		(–)		Multifunkcionális Sportcsarnok, Tatabánya
Round 9; 11 November 2022; 18:30		Report		Multifunkcionális Sportcsarnok, Tatabánya

Round 10; 26 November 2022; 16:00	Fejér-B.Á.L. Veszprém	–	MOL Tatabánya KC	Városi Sportcsarnok, Veszprém
Round 10; 26 November 2022; 16:00		(–)		Városi Sportcsarnok, Veszprém
Round 10; 26 November 2022; 16:00		Report		Városi Sportcsarnok, Veszprém

Round 11; 2 December 2022; 18:30	MOL Tatabánya KC	–	Balatonfüredi KSE	Multifunkcionális Sportcsarnok, Tatabánya
Round 11; 2 December 2022; 18:30		(–)		Multifunkcionális Sportcsarnok, Tatabánya
Round 11; 2 December 2022; 18:30		Report		Multifunkcionális Sportcsarnok, Tatabánya

Round 12; 10 December 2022; 18:00	HSA-NEKA	–	MOL Tatabánya KC	NEKA Sportcsarnok, Balatonboglár
Round 12; 10 December 2022; 18:00		(–)		NEKA Sportcsarnok, Balatonboglár
Round 12; 10 December 2022; 18:00		Report		NEKA Sportcsarnok, Balatonboglár

Round 13; 16 December 2022; 18:30	MOL Tatabánya KC	–	Dabas KC	Multifunkcionális Sportcsarnok, Tatabánya
Round 13; 16 December 2022; 18:30		(–)		Multifunkcionális Sportcsarnok, Tatabánya
Round 13; 16 December 2022; 18:30		Report		Multifunkcionális Sportcsarnok, Tatabánya

===== Results overview =====
Opposition	Home score	Away score	Double
Balatonfüredi KSE	2 Dec	13 May	-
Budai Farkasok-Rév Group	10 Feb	25–32	-
CYEB-Budakalász	28 Oct	1 Apr	-
HÉP-Cegléd	11 Nov	21 Apr	-
Csurgói KK	28–25	25 Feb	-
Dabas KK	16 Dec	27 May	-
Ferencvárosi TC	37–30	17 Feb	-
HE-DO B. Braun Gyöngyös	14 Apr	22 Oct	-
Sport36-Komló	26–22	18 Mar	-
HSA-NEKA	19 May	10 Dec	-
Pick Szeged	25 May	6 Nov	-
Telekom Veszprém	5 Mar	42–32	-
Fejér-B.Á.L. Veszprém	5 May	26 Nov	-

=== Magyar Kupa ===
Tatabánya entered the tournament in the fourth round.

== Statistics ==
=== Top scorers ===
Includes all competitive matches. The list is sorted by shirt number when total goals are equal. Last updated on 18 September 2022.

Position	Nation	No.	Name	Hungarian League	Hungarian Cup	Total
1	(Hungary)	27	Gábor Ancsin	19	0	19
2	(Hungary) (Spain)	26	Pedro Rodríguez Álvarez	17	0	17
3	(Bosnia and Herzegovina)	9	Josip Perić	17	0	17
4	(Hungary) (Croatia)	11	Petar Topic	10	0	10
5	(Hungary)	22	Mátyás Győri	9	0	9
6	(Croatia)	2	Mateo Maraš	6	0	6
7	(Hungary)	24	Márk Bodor	5	0	5
8	(Hungary)	33	Olivér Edwards	5	0	5
9	(Hungary) (Serbia)	23	Uroš Vilovski	3	0	3
10	(Hungary)	8	Dávid Ubornyák	3	0	3
11	(Hungary)	17	Andrej Pergel	1	0	1
12	(Spain)	15	Cristian Ugalde	1	0	1
13	(Hungary)	12	Márton Székely	1	0	1
			TOTALS	97	0	97

=== Attendances ===
The Home hall: Multifunkcionális Sportcsarnok

List of the home matches:

Round	Against	Attadance	Capatility	Date
NB I – 2.	Ferencvárosi TC	2,780	44.8%	September 10, 2022
NB I – 3.	Csurgói KK	2,160	34.8%	September 16, 2022
NB I – 5.	Sport36-Komló	1,800	29.0%	October 1, 2022
NB I – 7.	CYEB-Budakalász			October 28, 2022
NB I – 9.	HÉP-Cegléd			November 11, 2022
NB I – 11.	Balatonfüredi KSE			December 2, 2022
NB I – 13.	Dabas KC			December 16, 2022
