= Gyöngyösi KK =

Hungarian handball club

B.Braun Gyöngyös
- Full name: Gyöngyösi Kézilabda Klub
- Short name: GYKK, Gyöngyös
- Arena: Dr. Fejes András Sport- és Rendezvénycsarnok, Gyöngyös
- Capacity: 1,500
- President: Attila Nagy
- Head coach: Balázs Bíró
- Captain: Márk Hegedűs
- League: Nemzeti Bajnokság I
- 2022–23: Nemzeti Bajnokság I, 7th of 14
- Club colours
| Home | Away |

Gyöngyösi Kézilabda Klub is a Hungarian handball club from Gyöngyös, that plays in the Nemzeti Bajnokság I, the top level championship in Hungary.

The current name of the club is B|Braun Gyöngyös due to sponsorship reasons.

Location of HE-DO B. Braun Gyöngyös

== Crest, colours, supporters ==
=== Naming history ===
| Name | Period |
|---|---|
| Gyöngyösi Csépány SE | −1994 |
| Gyöngyösi Főiskola | 1994–1997 |
| Gyöngyösi Főiskola KK | 1997–2004 |
| Gyöngyösi FKK | 2004–2009 |
| Gyöngyösi KK | 2009–2011 |
| B.Braun Gyöngyös | 2011–2018 |
| HE-DO B. Braun Gyöngyös | 2018–present |

=== Kit manufacturers ===
| Period | Kit manufacturer |
|---|---|
| –2014 | (Germany) Puma |
| 2014–2018 | (Sweden) Salming |
| 2018–present | (Denmark) Hummel |

=== Kits ===
HOME
| 2013-14 | 2014–15 | 2016–17 | 2018–22 | 2022–23 | 2023–25 |

AWAY
| 2012-13 | 2013-14 | 2014–15 | 2016–17 | 2018–22 | 2022–23 |

THIRD
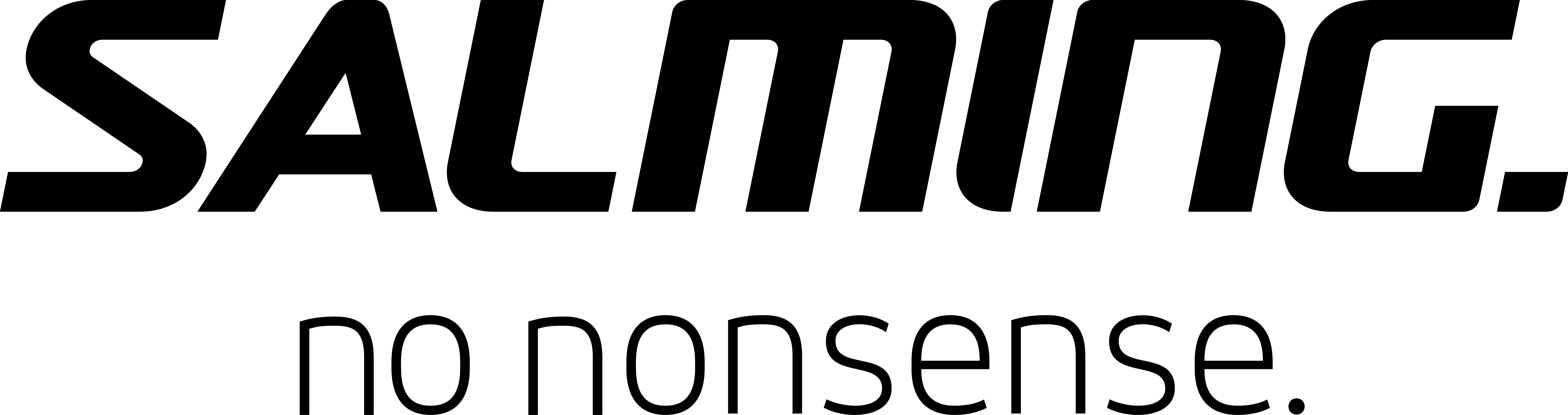
2014–15

=== Supporters and rivalries ===
The supporters of the club are based in Gyöngyös, in western part of Heves County, Hungary.

- Gyöngyösi KK's arch-rival is the neighbouring club Eger-Eszterházy SzSE and games between the clubs are considered as the "Heves megyei derbi".
- Gyöngyösi KK's arch-rival is the neighbouring club Mezőkövesdi KC and games between the clubs.

== Sports Hall information ==
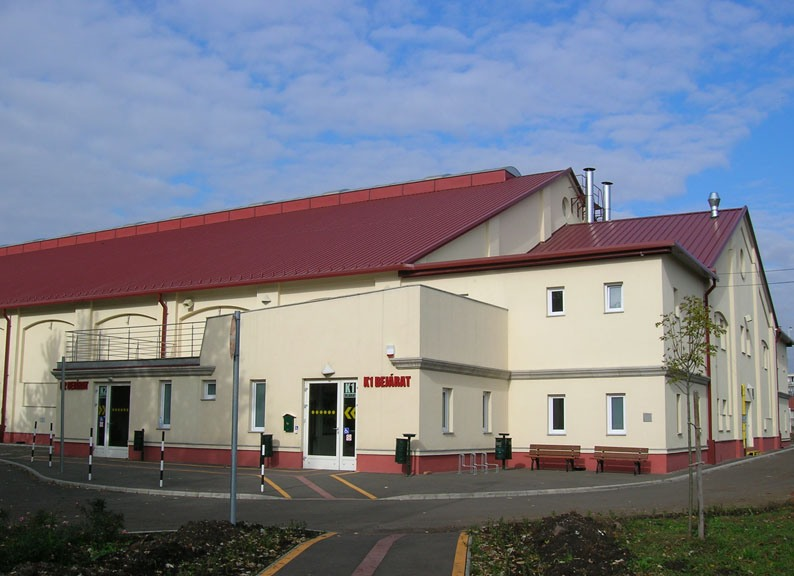
Home hall: Dr. Fejes András Sport- és Rendezvénycsarnok

- Name: – Dr. Fejes András Sport- és Rendezvénycsarnok
- City: – Gyöngyös
- Capacity: – 1500
- Address: – 3200 Gyöngyös, Kiss Péter utca 2.

== Management ==
| Position | Name |
|---|---|
| President | (Hungary) Attila Nagy |
| Member Of The Board | (Hungary) Péter Juhász |
| Member Of The Board | (Hungary) Sándor Kocsis |
| Member Of The Board | (Hungary) Mihály Erdei |
| Member Of The Board | (Hungary) Csaba Gáspár |
| Member Of The Board | (Hungary) Attila Zakar |
| Member Of The Board | (Hungary) István Rosta |

== Team ==
=== Current squad ===
Squad for the 2025–26 season

HE-DO B. Braun Gyöngyös

Goalkeepers

- 1 (Hungary) Barnabás Marczika
- 25 (Slovenia) Alen Skledar

Left Wingers

- 33 (Hungary) (United States) Olivér Edwards
- 45 (Hungary) Bercel Gyallai

Right Wingers

- 9 (Hungary) Levente Zakhar
- 11 (Hungary) Olivér Jaros
- 34 (Hungary) Bálint Végh

Line Players

- 4 (Denmark) Villads Raahauge Jensen
- 17 (Hungary) Gellért Ásványi
- 57 (Hungary) Norbert Jóga

Central Backs

- 8 (Hungary) Dávid Ubornyák
- 14 (Hungary) Balázs Szöllősi
- 30 (Hungary) István Mátés
- 55 (Hungary) Martin Gráf

Left Backs

- 13 (Hungary) Zalán Lang
- 71 (Hungary) Marcell Bihari

Right Backs

- 61 (Serbia) Milan Golubović
- 77 (Hungary) Kristóf Járó

=== Technical staff ===
- Head coach: (Hungary) Balázs Bíró
- Assistant coach: (Hungary) Ákos Sándor
- Goalkeeping coach: (Hungary) Henrik Hudák
- Fitness coach: (Hungary) Tamás Németh
- Masseur: (Hungary) Balázs Unger
- Club doctor: (Hungary) Dr.János Szívós

=== Transfers ===
Transfers for the 2026–27 season

Joining

- (Serbia) Milan Golubović (RB) from (Austria) HSG Bärnbach/Köflach
- (Denmark) Villads Raahauge Jensen (LP) from (Germany) SV Anhalt Bernburg
- (Hungary) Balázs Szöllősi (CB) from (Hungary) Győri ETO-UNI FKC
- (Hungary) István Mátés (CB) from (Hungary) Budakalász FKC
- (Hungary) Krisztián Mikler (GK) from (Hungary) ONE Veszprém
- (Hungary) Gellért Ásványi (LP) from (Hungary) Dabas KK
- (Hungary) Kristóf Járó (RB) from (Hungary) OTP Bank – Pick Szeged U21

Leaving

- (Hungary) Márk Hegedűs (LP) to (Hungary) PLER-Budapest
- (Hungary) Zsolt Schäffer (RB) to (Hungary) Szigetszentmiklósi KSK
- (Hungary) Bence Bálint (LB) to (Hungary) Ferencvárosi TC
- (Serbia) Aleksandar Tomić (GK)
- (Portugal) Daniel Neves (LB)
- (Hungary) Sándor Dobi (LP)
- (Hungary) Krisztián Mikler (GK) on loan at (Hungary) Ferencvárosi TC
- (Hungary) Ádám Nagy (RB) to (France) Pays d'Aix Université Club

Transfers for the 2025–26 season

Joining

- (Portugal) Daniel Neves (LB) from (Spain) BM Rebi Cuenca
- (Hungary) Barnabás Marczika (GK) from (Hungary) QHB-Eger
- (Hungary) Brunó Bajus (LW) from (Hungary) QHB-Eger
- (Hungary) Bence Bálint (LB) from (Hungary) Dabas KK
- (Hungary) Zalán Lang (LB) from (Hungary) Győri ETO-UNI FKC
- (Hungary) Bálint Végh (RW) on loan from (Hungary) ONE Veszprém

Leaving

- (Serbia) Mitar Markez (RB) to (Hungary) PLER-Budapest
- (Slovakia) Martin Potisk (CB) to (Belarus) HC Meshkov Brest
- (Belarus) Ilya Usik (GK) to (Israel) Maccabi Tel Aviv
- (Hungary) Máté Lakosy (RW) to (Hungary) Szigetszentmiklósi KSK
- (Hungary) Gergő Kovács (CB) to (Hungary) Dabas KK
- (Hungary) Barnabás Gyánti (GK) to (Hungary) Diósgyőri VTK
- (Hungary) Márk Bodor (LB)
- (Hungary) Brunó Bajus (LW) on loan at (Hungary) Mezőkövesdi KC

Transfers for the 2024–25 season

Joining

- (Serbia) Mitar Markez (RB) from (Hungary) Csurgói KK
- (Belarus) Ilya Usik (GK) from (Belarus) HC Meshkov Brest
- (Hungary) Sándor Dobi (LP) from (Hungary) Mezőkövesdi KC
- (Slovenia) Alen Skledar (GK) from (Slovenia) RK Trimo Trebnje

Leaving

- (Hungary) Milán Varsandán (LW) (retires)
- (Hungary) Péter Schmid (CB) to (Hungary) Szigetszentmiklósi KSK
- (Croatia) Lucian Bura (RB) to (North Macedonia) GRK Ohrid
- (Poland) Tomasz Pietruszko (LP) to (Poland) Zagłębie Lubin
- (Hungary) János Podoba (GK) to (Hungary) NEKA
- (Hungary) Dávid Nkousa (LB) to (Hungary) Diósgyőri VTK

Transfers for the 2023–24 season

Joining

- (Poland) Tomasz Pietruszko (LP) from (Poland) Zagłębie Lubin
- (Hungary) Dávid Ubornyák (CB) from (Hungary) MOL Tatabánya KC
- (Hungary) Márk Bodor (LB) from (Hungary) MOL Tatabánya KC
- (Hungary) (United States) Olivér Edwards (LW) from (Hungary) MOL Tatabánya KC
- (Hungary) János Podoba (GK) from (Hungary) Fejér B.Á.L. Veszprém
- (Hungary) Gergő Kovács (CB) from (Hungary) NEKA

Leaving

- (Bosnia and Herzegovina) Dino Hamidović (LB) to (Bosnia and Herzegovina) RK Gračanica
- (Hungary) László Bartucz (GK) to (Hungary) MOL Tatabánya KC
- (Hungary) Tibor Gerdán (LP) to (Hungary) Győri ETO-UNI FKC
- (Hungary) Máté Menyhárt (LW) to (Hungary) Sport36-Komló
- (Hungary) Máté Gábori (RW) to (Hungary) Szigetszentmiklósi KSK
- (Hungary) Levente Halász (LB) to (Hungary) Budakalász FKC
- (Hungary) Ádám Nagy (RB) on loan at (Hungary) NEKA

Transfers for the 2022–23 season

Joining

- (Hungary) László Bartucz (GK) from (Hungary) Grundfos Tatabánya KC
- (Slovakia) Martin Potisk (CB) from (Germany) ThSV Eisenach
- (Croatia) Lucian Bura (RB) from (Croatia) HRK Gorica
- (Hungary) Norbert Jóga (LP) from (Hungary) Sport36-Komló
- (Hungary) Máté Menyhárt (LW) from (Hungary) Kecskeméti TE
- (Hungary) Péter Schmid (CB) from (Hungary) Budakalász FKC
- (Hungary) Zsolt Schäffer (RB) from (Hungary) Csurgói KK
- (Hungary) Máté Lakosy (RW) from (Hungary) SBS-Eger
- (Hungary) Ádám Nagy (RB) from (Hungary) BFKA-Veszprém

Leaving

- (Serbia) Mitar Markez (RB) to (Hungary) Csurgói KK
- (Hungary) (Serbia) Uroš Vilovski (LP) to (Hungary) Grundfos Tatabánya KC
- (Hungary) Dávid Ubornyák (CB) to (Hungary) Grundfos Tatabánya KC
- (Hungary) Benedek Nagy (GK) loan back to (Hungary) Telekom Veszprém
- (Slovakia) Ľubomír Ďuriš (CB) to (Slovakia) MŠK Považská Bystrica
- (Hungary) Bence Papp (RB) to (Hungary) Budakalász FKC
- (United States) (Hungary) Pál Merkovszki (GK) to (Hungary) Budai Farkasok KKUK
- (Hungary) (Serbia) Marko Vasić (RW) to (Serbia) RK Vojvodina
- (Hungary) Bálint Rosta (LP) on loan at (Hungary) ETO-SZESE Győr

Transfers for the 2021–22 season

Joining

- (Bosnia and Herzegovina) Dino Hamidović (LB) from (Slovenia) RK Trimo Trebnje
- (Serbia) Aleksandar Tomić (GK) from (Slovenia) RK Trimo Trebnje
- (Hungary) (Serbia) Marko Vasić (RW) from (Hungary) Csurgói KK
- (Hungary) Dávid Nkousa (LB) from (Hungary) BFKA-Veszprém U22

Leaving

- (Bosnia and Herzegovina) Mirko Herceg (LB) to (Hungary) Csurgói KK
- (Hungary) Tamás Németh (LW) to (Hungary) KK Ajka
- (Hungary) (Slovakia) Mihály Tóth (GK) to (Hungary) Balatonfüredi KSE
- (Hungary) Egon Urbán (RW) to (Hungary) Sport36-Komló

Transfers for the 2020–21 season

Joining

- (Hungary) Levente Halász (LB) from (Hungary) Dabas KK
- (United States) (Hungary) Pál Merkovszki (GK) from (Hungary) Ferencvárosi TC
- (Hungary) Benedek Nagy (GK) on loan from (Hungary) Telekom Veszprém U21
- (Hungary) Bálint Rosta (LP) from (Hungary) MOL-Pick Szeged

Leaving

- (Hungary) Levente Sipeki (LB) to (Hungary) Hatvani KSZSE
- (Hungary) (Romania) Barna Buzogány (GK) to (Romania) Minaur Baia Mare
- (Hungary) László Újvári (LB) to (Hungary) Nyíregyházi SN KFT
- (Hungary) Roland Csányi (LP) to (Hungary) Orosházi FKSE
- (Hungary) Bence Gödör (GK) to (Faroe Islands) Neistin Tórshavn
- (Hungary) Bence Papp (RB) on loan at (Hungary) Hatvani KSZSE
- (Hungary) Bálint Rosta (LP) on loan at (Hungary) Mezőkövesdi KC

Transfers for the 2019–20 season

Joining

- (Hungary) Márk Hegedűs (LP) from (Hungary) Eger Eszterházy SZSE
- (Hungary) Bence Gödör (GK) from (Hungary) Telekom Veszprém
- (Hungary) Bence Papp (RB) from (Hungary) PLER KC
- (Hungary) László Újvári (LB) from (Hungary) Vecsési SE

Leaving

- (Hungary) (Serbia) Milorad Krivokapić (RB) to (Hungary) Ceglédi KKSE
- (Serbia) (Qatar) Milan Šajin (LB) to (Serbia) RK Jugović
- (Hungary) Péter István (LP) to (Hungary) Debreceni EAC
- (Hungary) Bence Papp (RB) on loan at (Hungary) Ceglédi KKSE

Transfers for the 2018–19 season

Joining

- (Hungary) (Serbia) Uroš Vilovski (LP) from (Romania) Minaur Baia Mare
- (Hungary) Milán Varsandán (LW) from (Hungary) Balatonfüredi KSE
- (Bosnia and Herzegovina) Mirko Herceg (LB) from (France) Massy Essonne Handball
- (Hungary) Dávid Ubornyák (CB) from (Hungary) Telekom Veszprém
- (Hungary) (Romania) Barna Buzogány (GK) from (Romania) Székelyudvarhelyi KC
- (Serbia) (Qatar) Milan Šajin (LB) from (Romania) Dinamo București

Leaving

- (Hungary) Péter Kovacsics (LW) to (Hungary) Ferencvárosi TC
- (Hungary) Ákos Lele (LB) to (Hungary) Orosházi FKSE
- (Slovakia) Matej Mikita (LB) to (France) Chartres MHB
- (Bosnia and Herzegovina) Vladan Lončar (LB) to (Croatia) RK Nexe Našice
- (Brazil) Henrique Pedro Martins (LP) to (Hungary) Mezőkövesdi KC
- (Brazil) Malandrin De Oliveira Rodolfo (RB) to (Italy) Handball Club Fondi
- (Hungary) Márk Holló (GK) to (Hungary) Veszprém KKFT Felsőörs
- (Hungary) Henrik Hudák (GK) to (Hungary) Hatvani KSZSE

Transfers for the 2017–18 season

Joining

- (Hungary) (Slovakia) Mihály Tóth (GK) from (Hungary) Grundfos Tatabánya KC
- (Serbia) Mitar Markez (RB) from (Romania) Székelyudvarhelyi KC
- (Croatia) Ivan Dumenčić (CB) from (Turkey) Beykoz Belediye SK
- (Hungary) Máté Gábori (RW) from (Hungary) Balatonfüredi KSE
- (Hungary) Tibor Gerdán (LP) from (Hungary) Balatonfüredi KSE
- (Brazil) Henrique Pedro Martins (LP) from (Brazil) São Caetano Handebol
- (Hungary) Péter István (LP) from (Hungary) Balmazújvárosi KK
- (Hungary) (Serbia) Milorad Krivokapić (RB) from (Romania) Székelyudvarhelyi KC
- (Brazil) Malandrin De Oliveira Rodolfo (RB) from (Hungary) Csurgói KK

Leaving

- (Hungary) Ádám Országh (RW) to (Hungary) Dabas KK
- (Czech Republic) Tomáš Řezníček (RB) to (Hungary) Budakalász FKC
- (Hungary) Károly Juhász (CB) to (Hungary) Ceglédi KKSE
- (Hungary) Norbert Jóga (LP) to (Hungary) Mezőkövesdi KC
- (Hungary) Gergő Rózsavölgyi (GK) loan back to (Hungary) Balatonfüredi KSE
- (Brazil) Malandrin De Oliveira Rodolfo (RB) to (Hungary) Csurgói KK
- (Croatia) Ivan Dumenčić (CB) to (United Arab Emirates) Al Jazira SC
- (Serbia) Miralem Bećirović (LP)
- (Hungary) Márk Hegedűs (LP) loan back to (Hungary) MOL-Pick Szeged

Transfers for the 2016–17 season

Joining

- (Slovakia) Ľubomír Ďuriš (CB) from (Slovakia) HC Sporta Hlohovec
- (Slovakia) Matej Mikita (LB) from (Hungary) PLER KC
- (Czech Republic) Tomáš Řezníček (RB) from (Czech Republic) HC Zubří
- (Serbia) Tibor Ivanišević (GK) from (Bosnia and Herzegovina) RK Borac Banja Luka
- (Serbia) Milan Rasic (LP) from (Turkey) Göztepe SK
- (Hungary) Ákos Lele (LB) from (Hungary) Grundfos Tatabánya KC
- (Hungary) Péter Keresztes (CB) from (Switzerland) Kadetten Schaffhausen
- (Hungary) Ádám Országh (RW) from (Hungary) Ceglédi KKSE
- (Hungary) Levente Sipeki (LB) from (Hungary) Ceglédi KKSE
- (Hungary) Tamás Németh (LW) from (Germany) TV 08 Willstätt
- (Hungary) Norbert Jóga (LP) from (Hungary) Orosházi FKSE
- (Hungary) Egon Urbán (RW) from (Hungary) MOL-Pick Szeged
- (Bosnia and Herzegovina) Vladan Lončar (LB) from (Hungary) MOL-Pick Szeged
- (Hungary) Márk Hegedűs (LP) on loan from (Hungary) MOL-Pick Szeged
- (Hungary) Gergő Rózsavölgyi (GK) on loan from (Hungary) Balatonfüredi KSE

Leaving

- (Hungary) Bence Nagy (LB) to (Hungary) CYEB Budakalász
- (Hungary) Zsolt Tamási (GK) to (Hungary) CYEB Budakalász
- (Hungary) Krisztián Rédai (LB) to (Hungary) CYEB Budakalász
- (Hungary) Dávid Debreczeni (LP) to (Hungary) Balatonfüredi KSE
- (Hungary) Milán Varsandán (LW) to (Hungary) Balatonfüredi KSE
- (Hungary) Tamás Koller (LB) to (Hungary) Váci KSE
- (Hungary) Attila Ménfői (RW) to (Hungary) Váci KSE
- (Hungary) Máté Marczinkó (RB) to (Hungary) Ferencvárosi TC
- (Hungary) Richárd Bali (LB) to (Hungary) Balmazújvárosi KK
- (Hungary) Ákos Sándor (LP) to (Hungary) Nyíregyházi KC
- (Hungary) Gábor Szalafai (RW) to (Hungary) Dabas KK
- (Serbia) Marko Jovetic (CB)
- (Serbia) Savo Mešter (CB) to (Turkey) Medical Park Antalyaspor
- (Serbia) Tibor Ivanišević (GK) to (Denmark) Skjern
- (Serbia) Milan Rasic (LP) to (Hungary) Balmazújvárosi KK
- (Hungary) Péter Keresztes (CB) on loan at (Hungary) PLER KC

Transfers for the 2015–16 season

Joining

- (Ukraine) Alexander Semikov (RB) from (Hungary) Sport36-Komló
- (Serbia) Savo Mešter (CB) from (Hungary) Sport36-Komló
- (Spain) Manuel Catalina Falcon (RW) from (Spain) BM Alcobendas
- (Brazil) Malandrin De Oliveira Rodolfo (RB) from (Brazil) Esporte Clube Pinheiros
- (Hungary) Károly Juhász (CB) from (Hungary) Balatonfüredi KSE
- (Hungary) Richárd Bali (LB) from (Hungary) Balmazújvárosi KK
- (Hungary) Péter Kovacsics (LW) from (Hungary) Csurgói KK
- (Hungary) Tibor Nigrínyi (LW) from (Hungary) Váci KSE
- (Hungary) Krisztián Rédai (LB) from (Hungary) PLER KC
- (Serbia) Miralem Bećirović (LP) from (Serbia) RK Vojvodina
- (Serbia) Marko Jovetic (CB) from (France) Mulhouse HSA

Leaving

- (Hungary) Gábor Hajdú (LB) to (Hungary) Mezőkövesdi KC
- (Hungary) Tamás Frey (CB) to (Hungary) Ózdi KC
- (Hungary) Ádám Iváncsik (LW) to (Hungary) Eger SBS
- (Hungary) György Bakos (CB) to (Hungary) PLER KC
- (Hungary) Bence Simon (CB) to (Hungary) FKSE Algyő
- (Hungary) Arián Andó (GK) from (Hungary) Balatonfüredi KSE
- (Hungary) József Czina (LB) to (Hungary) CYEB Budakalász
- (Hungary) Ádám Tóth (RW) to (Hungary) CYEB Budakalász
- (Hungary) András Koncz (CB) to (Hungary) CYEB Budakalász
- (Ukraine) Alexander Semikov (RB) to (Hungary) Sport36-Komló
- (Spain) Manuel Catalina Falcon (RW) to (Spain) BM Alcobendas

Transfers for the 2014–15 season

Joining

- (Hungary) Bence Nagy (LB) from (Hungary) PLER KC
- (Hungary) György Bakos (CB) from (Hungary) PLER KC
- (Hungary) Máté Marczinkó (RB) from (Hungary) PLER KC
- (Hungary) Robin Munkácsi (LP) from (Hungary) PLER KC
- (Hungary) Ádám Tóth (RW) from (Hungary) PLER KC
- (Hungary) András Koncz (CB) from (Hungary) PLER KC
- (Hungary) József Czina (LB) from (Hungary) MOL-Pick Szeged
- (Hungary) Bence Simon (CB) from (Hungary) ETO-SZESE Győr

Leaving

- (Hungary) Szilveszter Liszkai (GK) to (Hungary) Mezőkövesdi KC
- (Hungary) Balázs Holló (GK) to (Hungary) Mezőkövesdi KC
- (Japan) Atsushi Mekaru (CB) to (Hungary) Balmazújvárosi KK
- (Hungary) Tamás Oláh (RB) to (Hungary) Balmazújvárosi KK
- (Hungary) Dávid Bakos (RB) to (Hungary) Dabas KK
- (Hungary) Roland Sándor (CB) to (Hungary) Dabas KK
- (Hungary) Ádám Szöllősi (RW) to (Hungary) Budaörs-Tatabánya U23
- (Hungary) Robin Munkácsi (LP) to (Hungary) Váci KSE

Transfers for the 2013–14 season

Joining

- (Japan) Atsushi Mekaru (CB) from (Hungary) Ceglédi KKSE
- (Hungary) Gábor Hajdú (LB) from (Hungary) Pécsi VSE
- (Hungary) Ádám Iváncsik (LW) from (Hungary) Grundfos Tatabánya KC
- (Hungary) Szilveszter Liszkai (GK) from (Romania) Stiinta Bacau

Leaving

- (Hungary) Péter Gúnya (RW) to (Hungary) Szentendre KC
- (Hungary) Ákos Doros (LP) to (Hungary) Balmazújvárosi KK
- (Hungary) Attila Kotormán (RB) (retires)
- (Hungary) (Slovakia) Péter Szabó (LB) to (Hungary) Eger Eszterházy SZSE
- (Hungary) Tibor Gazdag (LW) to (Hungary) Csurgói KK

== Previous squads ==
2018–2019 Team
| Shirt No | Nationality | Player | Birth Date | Position |
|---|---|---|---|---|
| 4 | Hungary | Egon Urbán | 12 December 1996 (age 29) | Right Winger |
| 7 | Hungary | Tamás Németh | 27 January 1985 (age 41) | Left Winger |
| 11 | Hungary | Olivér Jaros | 10 December 2001 (age 24) | Right Winger |
| 13 | Hungary | Levente Sipeki | 13 August 1993 (age 33) | Left Back |
| 15 | Hungary | Milán Varsandán | 28 June 1989 (age 37) | Left Winger |
| 16 | HungarySlovakia | Mihály Tóth | 3 September 1992 (age 34) | Goalkeeper |
| 17 | Hungary | Dávid Ubornyák | 8 September 1998 (age 28) | Central Back |
| 20 | Hungary | Máté Gábori | 1 October 1987 (age 39) | Right Winger |
| 21 | Slovakia | Ľubomír Ďuriš | 5 September 1987 (age 39) | Central Back |
| 23 | HungarySerbia | Uroš Vilovski | 25 February 1984 (age 42) | Line Player |
| 26 | Hungary | Tibor Gerdán | 20 March 1992 (age 34) | Line Player |
| 34 | HungarySerbia | Milorad Krivokapić | 30 July 1980 (age 46) | Right Back |
| 44 | Bosnia and Herzegovina | Mirko Herceg | 26 February 1992 (age 34) | Left Back |
| 55 | Hungary | Martin Gráf | 7 January 2001 (age 25) | Central Back |
| 61 | Hungary | Felicián Manazya | 31 May 1999 (age 27) | Goalkeeper |
| 77 | Serbia | Mitar Markez | 25 October 1990 (age 35) | Right Back |
| 89 | Hungary | Péter István | 6 April 1989 (age 37) | Line Player |
| 93 | SerbiaQatar | Milan Šajin | 15 May 1993 (age 33) | Left Back |
| 99 | HungaryRomania | Barna Buzogány | 25 May 1999 (age 27) | Goalkeeper |

2016–2017 Team
| Shirt No | Nationality | Player | Birth Date | Position |
|---|---|---|---|---|
| 1 | Hungary | Henrik Hudák | 14 November 1982 (age 43) | Goalkeeper |
| 3 | Hungary | Ádám Országh | 6 October 1989 (age 37) | Right Winger |
| 4 | Hungary | Egon Urbán | 12 December 1996 (age 29) | Right Winger |
| 7 | Hungary | Tamás Németh | 27 January 1985 (age 41) | Left Winger |
| 9 | Hungary | Péter Kovacsics | 13 June 1994 (age 32) | Left Winger |
| 12 | Serbia | Tibor Ivanišević | 16 August 1990 (age 36) | Goalkeeper |
| 12 | Hungary | Gergő Rózsavölgyi | 8 May 1996 (age 30) | Goalkeeper |
| 13 | Hungary | Levente Sipeki | 13 August 1993 (age 33) | Left Back |
| 14 | Hungary | Péter Keresztes | 5 May 1996 (age 30) | Central Back |
| 20 | Czech Republic | Tomáš Řezníček | 14 March 1985 (age 41) | Right Back |
| 21 | Slovakia | Ľubomír Ďuriš | 5 September 1987 (age 39) | Central Back |
| 22 | Serbia | Milan Rasic | 16 May 1987 (age 39) | Line Player |
| 23 | Hungary | Márk Hegedűs | 14 September 1992 (age 34) | Line Player |
| 24 | Bosnia and Herzegovina | Vladan Lončar | 25 January 1997 (age 29) | Left Back |
| 26 | Serbia | Savo Mešter | 2 March 1990 (age 36) | Central Back |
| 28 | Hungary | Ákos Lele | 24 March 1988 (age 38) | Left Back |
| 35 | Brazil | Malandrin De Oliveira Rodolfo | 13 July 1992 (age 34) | Right Back |
| 55 | Hungary | Károly Juhász | 2 April 1987 (age 39) | Central Back |
| 57 | Hungary | Norbert Jóga | 20 July 1996 (age 30) | Line Player |
| 82 | Slovakia | Matej Mikita | 18 November 1994 (age 31) | Left Back |
| 95 | Hungary | Márk Holló | 20 July 1995 (age 31) | Goalkeeper |
| 99 | Serbia | Miralem Bećirović | 4 July 1983 (age 43) | Line Player |

2015–2016 Team
| Shirt No | Nationality | Player | Birth Date | Position |
|---|---|---|---|---|
| 1 | Hungary | Henrik Hudák | 14 November 1982 (age 43) | Goalkeeper |
| 5 | Hungary | Ákos Sándor | 6 January 1984 (age 42) | Line Player |
| 8 | Hungary | Attila Ménfői | 6 August 1997 (age 29) | Right Winger |
| 9 | Hungary | Péter Kovacsics | 13 June 1994 (age 32) | Left Winger |
| 11 | Hungary | Tibor Nigrínyi | 8 September 1980 (age 46) | Left Winger |
| 12 | Hungary | Márk Holló | 20 July 1995 (age 31) | Goalkeeper |
| 15 | Hungary | Milán Varsandán | 28 June 1989 (age 37) | Left Winger |
| 16 | Hungary | Zsolt Tamási | 28 November 1991 (age 34) | Goalkeeper |
| 18 | Serbia | Marko Jovetic | 12 July 1981 (age 45) | Central Back |
| 19 | Spain | Manuel Catalina Falcon | 19 July 1991 (age 35) | Right Winger |
| 21 | Hungary | Krisztián Rédai | 29 July 1995 (age 31) | Left Back |
| 22 | Hungary | Bence Nagy | 5 July 1995 (age 31) | Left Back |
| 23 | Hungary | Dávid Debreczeni | 23 September 1992 (age 34) | Line Player |
| 24 | Hungary | Máté Marczinkó | 23 January 1991 (age 35) | Right Back |
| 25 | Ukraine | Alexander Semikov | 9 July 1985 (age 41) | Right Back |
| 26 | Serbia | Savo Mešter | 2 March 1990 (age 36) | Central Back |
| 30 | Hungary | Richárd Bali | 30 March 1989 (age 37) | Left Back |
| 31 | Hungary | Gábor Szalafai | 13 April 1985 (age 41) | Right Winger |
| 33 | Hungary | Tamás Koller | 30 September 1992 (age 34) | Left Back |
| 35 | Brazil | Malandrin De Oliveira Rodolfo | 13 July 1992 (age 34) | Right Back |
| 95 | Hungary | Károly Juhász | 2 April 1987 (age 39) | Central Back |
| 99 | Serbia | Miralem Bećirović | 4 July 1983 (age 43) | Line Player |

2014–2015 Team
| Shirt No | Nationality | Player | Birth Date | Position |
|---|---|---|---|---|
| 1 | Hungary | Henrik Hudák | 14 November 1982 (age 43) | Goalkeeper |
| 5 | Hungary | Ákos Sándor | 6 January 1984 (age 42) | Line Player |
| 6 | Hungary | Tamás Frey | 23 March 1978 (age 48) | Central Back |
| 7 | Hungary | Ádám Iváncsik | 20 June 1990 (age 36) | Left Winger |
| 10 | Hungary | József Czina | 24 November 1980 (age 45) | Left Back |
| 12 | Hungary | Márk Holló | 20 July 1995 (age 31) | Goalkeeper |
| 14 | Hungary | György Bakos | 28 May 1984 (age 42) | Central Back |
| 15 | Hungary | Milán Varsandán | 28 June 1989 (age 37) | Left Winger |
| 16 | Hungary | Zsolt Tamási | 28 November 1991 (age 34) | Goalkeeper |
| 17 | Hungary | Ádám Tóth | 18 October 1995 (age 30) | Right Winger |
| 19 | Hungary | Robin Munkácsi | 19 November 1994 (age 31) | Line Player |
| 20 | Hungary | Gábor Hajdú | 20 October 1989 (age 36) | Left Back |
| 22 | Hungary | Bence Nagy | 5 July 1995 (age 31) | Left Back |
| 23 | Hungary | Dávid Debreczeni | 23 September 1992 (age 34) | Line Player |
| 24 | Hungary | Máté Marczinkó | 23 January 1991 (age 35) | Right Back |
| 31 | Hungary | Gábor Szalafai | 13 April 1985 (age 41) | Right Winger |
| 33 | Hungary | Tamás Koller | 30 September 1992 (age 34) | Left Back |
| 39 | Hungary | Bence Simon | 4 December 1988 (age 37) | Central Back |
| 54 | Hungary | András Koncz | 1 August 1995 (age 31) | Central Back |

2011–2012 Team
| Shirt No | Nationality | Player | Birth Date | Position |
|---|---|---|---|---|
| 5 | Hungary | Ákos Sándor | 6 January 1984 (age 42) | Line Player |
| 6 | Hungary | Máté Halász | 2 June 1984 (age 42) | Left Back |
| 7 | Hungary | Tibor Gazdag | 7 August 1991 (age 35) | Left Winger |
| 9 | Hungary | Roland Sándor | 13 March 1989 (age 37) | Central Back |
| 11 | Hungary | Tibor Nigrínyi | 8 September 1980 (age 46) | Left Winger |
| 12 | Hungary | Pál Kenyeres | 30 August 1974 (age 52) | Goalkeeper |
| 13 | Hungary | Attila Kotormán | 10 November 1972 (age 53) | Right Back |
| 15 | Hungary | Károly Juhász | 2 April 1987 (age 39) | Central Back |
| 16 | Hungary | Zsolt Tamási | 28 November 1991 (age 34) | Goalkeeper |
| 20 | Hungary | Ákos Doros | 27 September 1974 (age 52) | Line Player |
| 21 | Hungary | Péter Gúnya | 14 April 1975 (age 51) | Right Winger |
| 23 | Hungary | Dávid Debreczeni | 23 September 1992 (age 34) | Line Player |
| 29 | Hungary | Zsolt Balogh | 29 March 1989 (age 37) | Right Back |
| 31 | Hungary | Gábor Szalafai | 13 April 1985 (age 41) | Right Winger |
| 33 | Hungary | Tamás Koller | 30 September 1992 (age 34) | Left Back |
| 37 | Slovakia | Michal Melus | 17 April 1974 (age 52) | Goalkeeper |
| 77 | Hungary | Gergely Pál | 18 May 1985 (age 41) | Left Back |

== Top scorers ==
| Season | Player | Apps/Goals |
|---|---|---|
| 2005–2006 | (Serbia) Petar Papić | 25/173 |
| 2006–2007 | (Hungary) Krisztián Patócskai | 31/181 |
| 2007–2008 | (Slovakia) Marian Kleis | 27/138 |
| 2008–2009 | (Slovakia) Marian Kleis | 32/219 |
| 2009–2010 | (Hungary) Zoltán Kaplonyi | 30/127 |
| 2010–2011 | (Hungary) Roland Sándor | 24/127 |
| 2011–2012 | (Hungary) Zsolt Balogh | 26/160 |
| 2012–2013 | (Hungary) (Slovakia) Péter Szabó | 25/101 |
| 2013–2014 | (Hungary) Tamás Frey | 27/124 |
| 2014–2015 | (Hungary) Milán Varsandán | 30/109 |
| 2015–2016 | (Hungary) Bence Nagy | 38/186 |
| 2016–2017 | (Hungary) Ákos Lele | 17/92 |
| 2017–2018 | (Serbia) Mitar Markez | 26/93 |
| 2018–2019 | (Serbia) Mitar Markez | 26/102 |
| 2019–2020 | Cancelled | |
| 2020–2021 | (Serbia) Mitar Markez | 24/104 |
| 2021–2022 | (Serbia) Mitar Markez | 25/137 |
| 2022–2023 | (Hungary) Milán Varsandán | 24/104 |
| 2023–2024 | (Hungary) Milán Varsandán | 25/118 |
| 2024–2025 | (Slovakia) Martin Potisk | 23/98 |

== Retired numbers ==
HE-DO B. Braun Gyöngyös retired numbers
| N° | Nationality | Player | Position | Tenure |
|---|---|---|---|---|
| 5 | (Hungary) | Ákos Sándor | Line Player | 2009–2016 |
| 7 | (Hungary) | Tamás Németh | Left Winger | 2016–2021 |
| 15 | (Hungary) | Milán Varsandán | Left Winger | 2012–2016, 2018–2024 |

== Honours ==
| Honours | | No. | Years |
League
| Nemzeti Bajnokság I/B | Winners | 2 | 2005–06, 2010–11 |
Domestic Cups
| Magyar Kupa | Third Place | 1 | 2008–09 |

=== Individual awards ===
==== Domestic ====
Nemzeti Bajnokság I Top Scorer

| Season | Name | Goals |
|---|---|---|
| 2008–09 | (Slovakia) Marian Kleis | 219 |
| 2015–16 | (Hungary) Bence Nagy | 186 |

== Seasons ==
=== Season to season ===
As of 08/07/2025

| Season | Tier | Division | Place | Magyar Kupa |
|---|---|---|---|---|
| 1992–93 | 4 | MB I Heves | 1st | |
| 1993–94 | 3 | NB II Északkelet | 14th | |
| 1994–95 | 3 | NB II Észak | 4th | |
| 1995–96 | 3 | NB II Észak | 7th | |
| 1996–97 | 3 | NB II Észak | 4th | |
| 1997–98 | 3 | NB II Észak | 1st | |
| 1998–99 | 2 | NB I/B Kelet | 7th | |
| 1999–00 | 2 | NB I/B Kelet | 6th | |
| 2000–01 | 2 | NB I/B Kelet | 8th | |

| Season | Tier | Division | Place | Magyar Kupa |
|---|---|---|---|---|
| 2001–02 | 2 | NB I/B Kelet | 4th | |
| 2002–03 | 2 | NB I/B Kelet | 9th | |
| 2003–04 | 2 | NB I/B Kelet | 5th | |
| 2004–05 | 2 | NB I/B Kelet | 4th | |
| 2005–06 | 2 | NB I/B Kelet | 1st | |
| 2006–07 | 1 | NB I | 10th | |
| 2007–08 | 1 | NB I | 11th | |
| 2008–09 | 1 | NB I | 11th | Third place |
| 2009–10 | 1 | NB I | 12th | |

| Season | Tier | Division | Place | Magyar Kupa |
|---|---|---|---|---|
| 2010–11 | 2 | NB I/B Kelet | 1st | Quarter-finals |
| 2011–12 | 1 | NB I | 6th | Quarter-finals |
| 2012–13 | 1 | NB I | 6th | Quarter-finals |
| 2013–14 | 1 | NB I | 6th | Fourth place |
| 2014–15 | 1 | NB I | 7th | Quarter-finals |
| 2015–16 | 1 | NB I | 10th | Round 2 |
| 2016–17 | 1 | NB I | 12th | Round 3 |
| 2017–18 | 1 | NB I | 11th | Round 2 |
| 2018–19 | 1 | NB I | 6th | Round 4 |
| 2019–20 | 1 | NB I | Cancelled due COVID-19 | |
| 2020–21 | 1 | NB I | 11th | Round 4 |
| 2021–22 | 1 | NB I | 6th | Round 5 |
| 2022–23 | 1 | NB I | 7th | Round 5 |
| 2023–24 | 1 | NB I | 6th | Round 4 |
| 2024–25 | 1 | NB I | 8th | Fourth place |
| 2025–26 | 1 | NB I | | |

=== European competition ===
| Season | Competition | Round | Club | Home | Away | Aggregate |
|---|---|---|---|---|---|---|
| 2020–21 | EHF European League | First qualifying round | (North Macedonia) HC Butel Skopje | 34–21 | 24–25 | 58–46 |
| 2020–21 | EHF European League | Second qualifying round | (Germany) Füchse Berlin | 23–25 | 24–36 | 47–61 |

==== European record ====
As of 30 September 2021:

| Competition | Seasons | Year(s) in the competition |
|---|---|---|
| EHF European League | 1x | 2020–21 |
| Source: kézitörténelem.hu | 1 seasons | |

==== EHF ranking ====
As of 25/09/2025

| Rank | Team | Points |
|---|---|---|
| 202 | (Faroe Islands) Stranda ÍF | 10 |
| 203 | (Turkey) Nilüfer Belediyespor | 10 |
| 204 | (Austria) Handball Tirol | 10 |
| 205 | (Hungary) HE-DO B. Braun Gyöngyös | 10 |
| 206 | (Montenegro) Rk Budvanska Rivijera | 10 |
| 207 | (Netherlands) OCI-Lions | 10 |
| 208 | (North Macedonia) RK Metalurg Skopje | 9 |

== Former club members ==
=== Notable former players ===
==== Goalkeepers ====
- (Hungary) Arián Andó (2014–2015)
- (Hungary) Szilveszter Liszkai (2013)
- (Hungary) Benedek Nagy (2020–2022)
- (Hungary) Levente Nagy (2008–2009)
- (Hungary) Zsolt Perger (2008–2009)
- (Hungary) (Slovakia) Mihály Tóth (2017–2021)
- (Belarus) Ilya Usik (2024–)
- (Slovenia) Alen Skledar (2025–)
- (Serbia) Tibor Ivanišević (2016)
- (Serbia) Aleksandar Tomić (2021–)
- (Slovakia) Michal Meluš

==== Right wingers ====
- (Hungary) Csaba Bendó (2008–2010)
- (Hungary) Péter Gúnya
- (Hungary) Ádám Országh (2016–2017)
- (Hungary) Gábor Szalafai (2011–2016)
- (Hungary) Ádám Tóth (2014–2015)

==== Left wingers ====
- (Hungary) György Bakos
- (Hungary) (United States) Olivér Edwards (2023–)
- (Hungary) Tibor Gazdag (2010–2013)
- (Hungary) Péter Kovacsics (2015–2018)
- (Hungary) Milán Varsandán (2012–2016, 2018–2024)

==== Line players ====
- (Hungary) Ákos Doros (2011–2013)
- (Hungary) Tamás Habuczki
- (Hungary) Márk Hegedűs
- (Hungary) István Rosta
- (Hungary) Ákos Sándor (2009–2016)
- (Slovakia) Michal Kopčo (2007–2009)

==== Left backs ====
- (Hungary) Ádám Bajorhegyi (2003–2007)
- (Hungary) József Czina
- (Hungary) Ákos Lele (2016–2018)
- (Hungary) Bence Nagy (2014–2016)
- (Hungary) (Slovakia) Péter Szabó
- (Bosnia and Herzegovina) Dino Hamidović (2021–2023)
- (Bosnia and Herzegovina) Mirko Herceg (2018–2021)
- (Bosnia and Herzegovina) Vladan Lončar
- (Serbia) (Qatar) Milan Šajin
- (Slovakia) Matej Mikita (2016–2018)

==== Central backs ====
- (Hungary) Tamás Frey
- (Hungary) András Koncz (2014–2015)
- (Hungary) Dávid Ubornyák (2018–2022, 2023–)
- (Japan) Atsushi Mekaru
- (Serbia) Savo Mešter (2015–2016)
- (Slovakia) Ľubomír Ďuriš
- (Slovakia) Marian Kleis
- (Slovakia) Martin Potisk
- (Slovakia) Gabriel Vadkerti

==== Right backs ====
- (Hungary) Dávid Bakos
- (Hungary) Zsolt Balogh (2011–2012)
- (Hungary) Attila Kotormán
- (Hungary) (Serbia) Milorad Krivokapić (2018–2019)
- (Hungary) Zsolt Szobol
- (Czech Republic) Tomáš Řezníček (2016–2017)
- (Serbia) Mitar Markez (2017–2022, 2024–)

=== Former coaches ===
| Seasons | Coach | Country |
|---|---|---|
| 2009 | Gábor Adorján | (Hungary) |
| 2009–2013 | Károly Nagy | (Hungary) |
| 2013–2015 | István Gulyás | (Hungary) |
| 2015–2017 | Viktor Debre | (Hungary) |
| 2017 | Tibor Nigrínyi | (Hungary) |
| 2017–2022 | Csaba Konkoly | (Hungary) |
| 2022 | Dániel Kiss | (Hungary) |
| 2022– | Balázs Bíró | (Hungary) |
