= Csaba Konkoly =

Hungarian handball coach (born 1970)

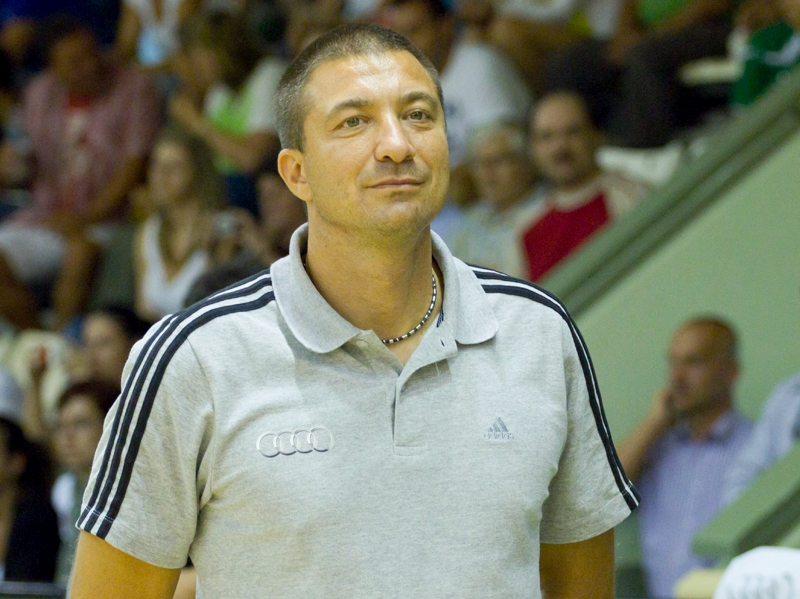

Personal information
- Nationality: Hungarian
- Born: 6 September 1970 (age 56)

Sport
- Sport: Handball
- Current club: Gyöngyösi KK (head coach)

Teams managed
- Years: Team
- 2007–2011: Győri ETO KC
- 2012: Fehérvár KC
- 2012–2013: Győri ETO KC II
- 2013–2015: Váci NKSE
- 2015–2017: TuS Metzingen
- 2017–2022: Gyöngyösi KK
- 2022–2023: Fejér B.Á.L. Veszprém

Csaba Konkoly (Hungarian: [ˈt͡ʃɒbɒ ˈkoŋkoj]; born 6 September 1970) is a Hungarian handball coach and the current head coach of handball club Gyöngyösi KK.

Konkoly took his first head coach position in 2007, when he replaced Kálmán Róth on the bench of Győri ETO KC. Konkoly remained in Győr until 2011, during which period the team won 4 Hungarian championships and 4 Hungarian cup titles, and reached the final of the EHF Champions League (2009).

He was fired in November 2011 but did not remain without work for long, being approached by the Hungarian women's handball team Fehérvár KC in January 2012 and eventually signed to the club a month later, replacing Attila Mihály on the bench. At the end of the season he returned to Győr, this time as youth coach.

He left Győr in 2013 and since then has been the coach of Váci NKSE and TuS Metzingen. He took over the head coach position of Gyöngyösi KK in 2017.

== Honors ==
- Nemzeti Bajnokság I:
  - Winner: 2008, 2009, 2010, 2011
- Magyar Kupa:
  - Winner: 2008, 2009, 2010, 2011
- Women's EHF Champions League:
  - Finalist: 2009
  - Semifinalist: 2008, 2010, 2011

I. BUNDESLIGA WOMEN  2.PLACE TUS METZINGEN 2015
I. BUNDESLIGA WOMEN  3.PLACE TUS METZINGEN 2016
EHF CUP WOMEN'S : FINALIST 2015
EHF CUP WOMEN'S : SEMIFINAL 2016
