= Gábor Grebenár =

Hungarian handball player (born 1984)

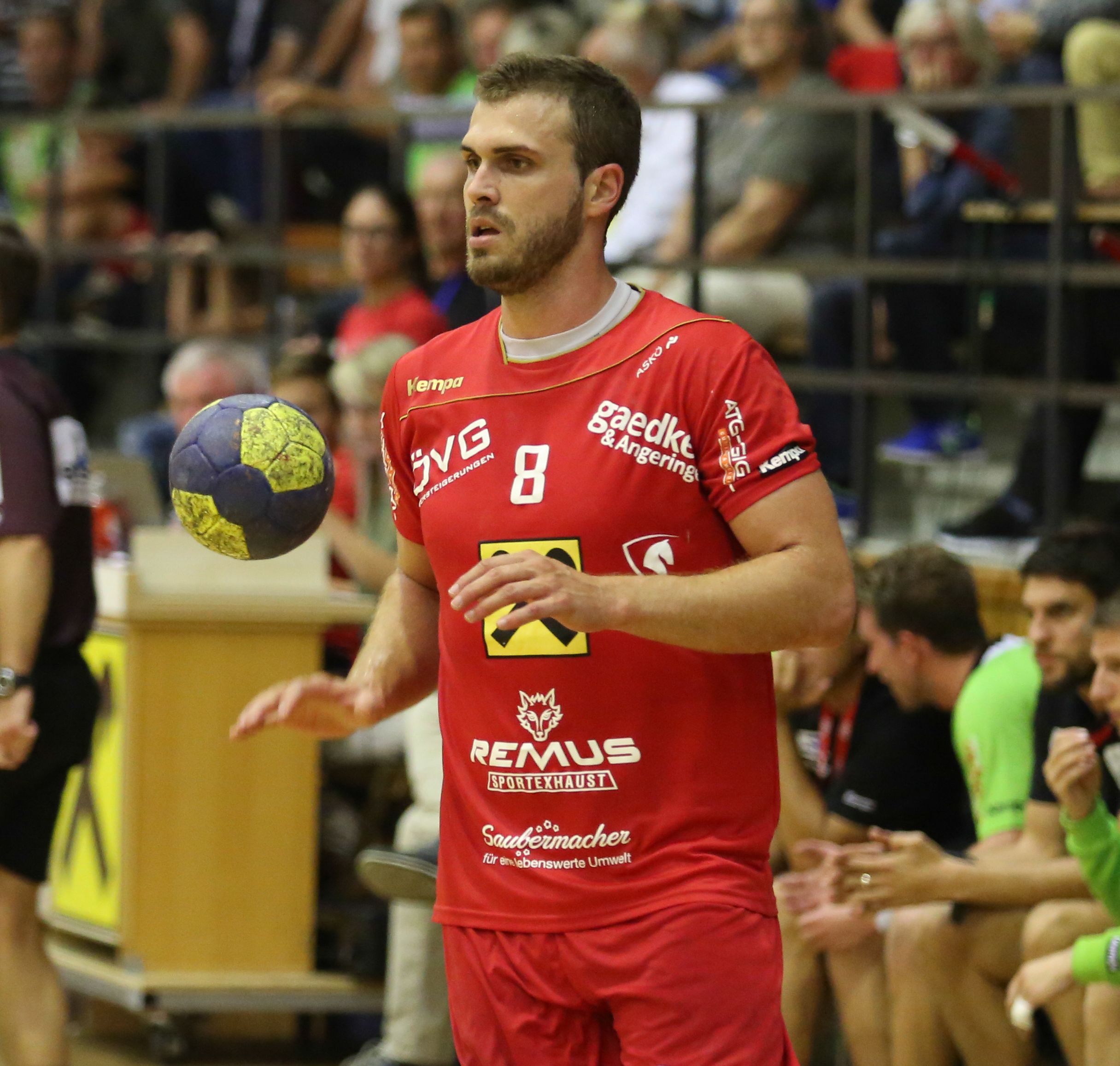

Personal information
- Full name: Gábor Grebenár
- Nationality: Hungarian
- Born: 17 August 1984 (age 42) Celldömölk, Hungary
- Height: 1.95 m (6 ft 5 in)

Sport
- Sport: Handball
- Position: Left Back
- Current club: PLER KC

Senior clubs
- Years: Team
- 2002–2009: Dunaferr SE
- 2009–2012: BM Aragón
- 2012–2014: Csurgói KK
- 2014–2015: US Ivry
- 2015–2017: HSG Bärnbach Köflach
- 2017–2018: Ferencvárosi TC
- 2018–: PLER KC
National team
Years	Team	Apps	(Gls)
2005–2013	Hungary	53	(57)
- Updated on 4 September 2018

Gábor Grebenár (born 17 August 1984 in Celldömölk) is a Hungarian handballer who plays for PLER KC as a left back.

Gábor participated at the 2008 European Men's Handball Championship, where he finished eighth with the Hungarian team.

== Achievements ==
- Nemzeti Bajnokság I:
  - Bronze Medalist: 2003, 2004, 2005, 2006, 2007, 2008, 2009
- EHF Cup:
  - Semifinalist: 2003
