= Péter Lendvay =

Hungarian handball player (born 1976)

Péter Lendvay (born 15 September 1976 in Budapest) is a Hungarian handball player who plays for Hungarian top division side FTC-PLER KC.

Lendvay played several times for the Hungarian national team. He competed at the 2004 Summer Olympics, where the Hungarian team placed fourth. He was also present on a World Championship (2003) and on a European Championship (2007).
