= Vuk Lakićević =

Montenegrin handball player (born 2001)

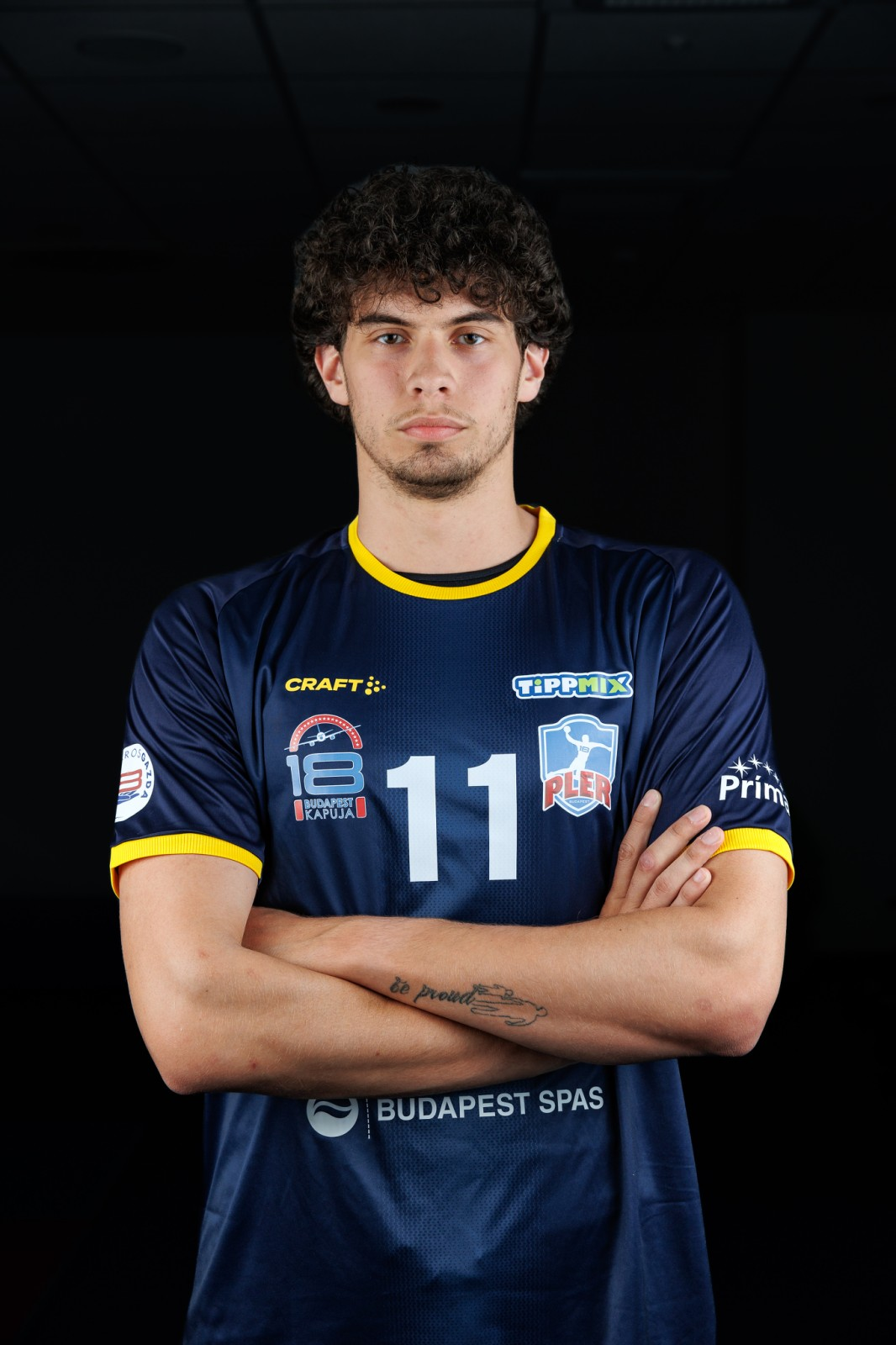

Personal information
- Nationality: Montenegrin
- Born: 25 October 2001 (age 24) Nikšić, Montenegro
- Height: 2.00 m (6 ft 7 in)

Sport
- Sport: Handball
- Position: Right back
- Current club: (Kosovo) KH Kastrioti
- Number: 11

Youth career
- Years: Team
- 2012–2017: RK Čelik Nikšić

Senior clubs
- Years: Team
- 2017–2018: (Montenegro) RK Sutjeska Nikšić
- 2018–2019: (Montenegro) RK Budvanska Rivijera
- 2019–2020: (Montenegro) RK Budućnost Podgorica
- 2020–2021: (North Macedonia) RK Struga
- 2021–2023: (Switzerland) TSV St. Otmar St. Gallen
- 2023–2024: (Montenegro) RK Lovćen
- 2024–2025: (Hungary) PLER-Budapest
- 2025: (United Arab Emirates) Mleeha Club

Vuk Lakićević (born 25 October 2001) is a Montenegrin handball player who plays for KH Kastrioti in Kosovo.

== Career ==
=== Club ===
Lakićević started his career in RK Čelik Nikšić at the age of 11. After 5 years spent in youth team of Čelik, he went to RK Sutjeska Nikšić where he made his debut for the senior team with only 16 years old. In the Montenegrin league, as one of the most talented young players, he also played for RK Budvanska Rivijera and RK Budućnost Podgorica, after which he signed for RK Struga in North Macedonia in the 2020/21 season. After a year spent in North Macedonia, as one of the best right backs in the Macedonian Handball Super League (Votes from handball site "24Rakomet"), he went to Switzerland, St. Gallen and became a member of TSV St. Otmar St. Gallen as a youngest player in team. In 2023, he returned home to the RK Lovćen team. In February 2024, he transferred to Hungarian PLER-Budapest. In August 2025, Lakicevic signed contract with UAE club Mleeha. He underwent shoulder surgery in December 2025 and he signed with KH Kastrioti during his recovery and returned to the field in September 2026.
