= Gábor Szalafai =

Hungarian handball player (born 1985)

Personal information
- Nationality: Hungarian
- Born: 13 April 1985 (age 41)
- Height: 1.94 m (6 ft 4 in)

Sport
- Sport: Handball
- Position: Right wing
- Current club: Gyöngyösi KK
National team
Years	Team	Apps	(Gls)
–	Hungary	10	(10)

Gábor Szalafai (born 13 April 1985) is a Hungarian handball player for Gyöngyösi KK and the Hungarian national team.
