= Milan Šajin =

Qatari handball player (born 1993)

Personal information
- Nationality: Serbian/Qatari
- Born: 16 May 1993 (age 33) Vrbas, Serbia
- Height: 1.97 m (6 ft 6 in)

Sport
- Sport: Handball
- Position: Left Back
- Current club: RK Jugović
- Number: 93

Youth career
- Years: Team
- –: RK Vrbas

Senior clubs
- Years: Team
- –: RK Vrbas
- 2009–2010: RK Sombor
- 2010–2012: Qatar SC
- 2012–2016: El Jaish SC
- 2016: RK Metalurg Skopje
- 2016–2017: Ceglédi KKSE
- 2017–2018: CS Dinamo București
- 2018–2019: Gyöngyösi KK
- 2020–2021: RK Jugovic
- 2023-2025: Rk Vrbas
National team
Years	Team	Apps	(Gls)
–	Qatar	16	(43)

Milan Šajin (Serbian Cyrillic: Милан Шајин; born 16 Mаy 1993) is a Serbian-born Qatari handball player who plays for RK Jugović and the Qatar men's national handball team.
