= László Bartucz =

Hungarian handball player (born 1991)

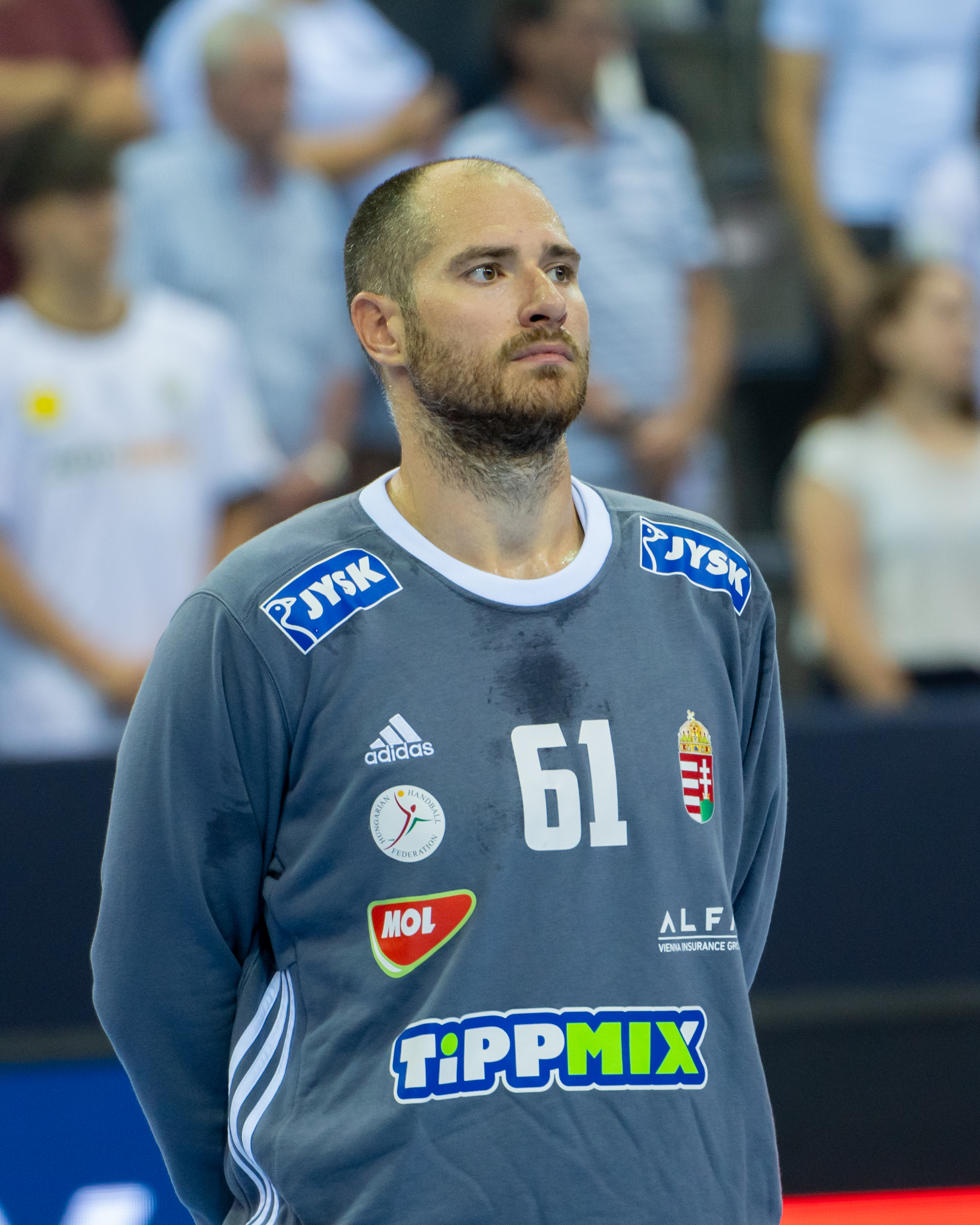
- Bartucz in 2024

Personal information
- Nationality: Hungarian
- Born: 5 November 1991 (age 35) Orosháza, Hungary
- Height: 1.94 m (6 ft 4 in)

Sport
- Sport: Handball
- Position: Goalkeeper
- Current club: HSG Wetzlar
- Number: 16

Youth career
- Years: Team
- 2005–2006: Békéscsabai DSK
- 2006–2010: PLER KC

Senior clubs
- Years: Team
- 2010–2011: Uniqa-PVSE
- 2011–2013: Grundfos Tatabánya KC
- 2013–2015: Ceglédi KKSE
- 2015–2018: Csurgói KK
- 2018–2022: Grundfos Tatabánya KC
- 2022–2023: HE-DO B. Braun Gyöngyös
- 2023–2025: MOL Tatabánya KC
- 2025–2026: MT Melsungen
- 2026-: HSG Wetzlar
National team
Years	Team	Apps	(Gls)
2015–	Hungary	53	(0)

László Bartucz (born 5 November 1991) is a Hungarian handball player. He plays for HSG Wetzlar and the Hungary national team.

== Career ==
=== Club ===
László Bartucz started playing handball in Békéscsaba, then spent four seasons in the PLER KC. He was first entered here in 2008 for the adult NB1 match, but outside of this occasion he was only expected to play in the junior match. He had a regular opportunity to play for the Pécsi VSE from 2010, where he finished 9th in the playoffs after 11th place in the regular season. He then played for two seasons in Grundfos Tatabánya KC, in 2013 they could play for the bronze medal in the championship, but they lost the bronze match against Csurgói KK in 4th place. He also spent two seasons in the Ceglédi KKSE team belonging to the lower house of the championship. During his time here, he took part in a test drive at the German Rhein-Neckar Löwen, but in 2015, he finished 4th in the championship for Csurgói KK. He returned to Grundfos Tatabánya KC in the summer of 2018. He won 2 bronze medals here, and since his contract was not extended, he signed with the HE-DO B. Braun Gyöngyös team in 2022. He spent one season here and was signed by MOL Tatabánya KC again in the summer of 2023.

=== National team ===
As a member of the junior national team, he participated in the 2011 Junior World Championship where the Hungarian team became the 17th. He was a member of the Hungarian B-team, which was launched in 2014. He played his first match in the Hungarian national team on June 10, 2015, in the European Championship qualifying match against the Portuguese national team. After the Hungarian national team won its group in the qualifying series, it also became a member of the framework for the 2016 European Championships. He participated in the 2016 European Championships (12th place, 6 matches / 0 goals). He was also a member of the 2022 European Men's Handball Championship squad, but in the end he did not become a member of the narrow squad. He also participated in the 2024 European Men's Handball Championship as a member of the Hungary men's national handball team. (5th place, 7 matches / 0 goals). He also participated in the 2024 Paris Olympics, where the Hungarian team finished 10th (4 matches / 0 goals). He also participated in the 2025 World Men's Handball Championship as a member of the Hungary men's national handball team. (8th place, 3 matches / 0 goals). He also participated in the 2026 European Men's Handball Championship as a member of the Hungary men's national handball team. (10th place, 7 games / 0 goals).

== Honours ==
=== Club ===
Grundfos Tatabánya KC

- Nemzeti Bajnokság I
  - Bronze: 2019, 2021, 2024
- Magyar Kupa
  - Bronze: 2012, 2025

MT Melsungen

- EHF European League:
  - Gold: 2026
