= Benedek Nagy =

Hungarian handball player (born 2001)

Personal information
- Nationality: Hungarian
- Born: 17 November 2001 (age 24) Budapest, Hungary
- Height: 1.95 m (6 ft 5 in)

Sport
- Sport: Handball
- Position: Goalkeeper
- Current club: HBW Balingen-Weilstetten

Youth career
- Years: Team
- 2014–2016: Csanádi KSI SE
- 2016–2018: Rév TSC

Senior clubs
- Years: Team
- 2018–2026: (Hungary) Telekom Veszprém
- 2020–2022: → (Hungary) HE-DO B. Braun Gyöngyös (loan)
- 2022–2023: → (Hungary) MOL-Tatabánya KC (loan)
- 2024: → (Spain) BM Atlético Valladolid (loan)
- 2024–2026: → (Germany) HBW Balingen-Weilstetten (loan)
- 2026–: (Spain) BM Atlético Valladolid
National team
Years	Team	Apps	(Gls)
2025–	Hungary	1	(0)

Benedek Nagy (born 17 November 2001) is a Hungarian handball player for HBW Balingen-Weilstetten.

== Career ==
=== Club ===
Benedek started his career at Csanádi KSI SE. In 2016, he transferred to the Rév TSC team, from where he moved to Telekom Veszprém in August 2018. In the 2018/2019 and 2019/20 seasons, he played in Telekom Veszprém's second team only in Nemzeti Bajnokság I/B. From 2020, he was loaned to the HE-DO B. Braun Gyöngyös team for 2 seasons. He made his debut in the Hungarian first division in the HE-DO B. Braun Gyöngyös team in September 2020. He also played with HE-DO B. Braun Gyöngyös in the 2020/21 EHF European League, playing in all 4 of the team's matches. Telekom Veszprém loaned him to MOL-Tatabánya KC for the 2022/23 season. He won a bronze medal here at the end of the season, but returned to Telekom Veszprém in the summer. Here he was also able to make his debut in the EHF Champions League: in the fall of 2023, he played in 6 matches. In the spring of 2024, he was loaned to the Spanish first division BM Atlético Valladolid. In May 2024, the German HBW Balingen-Weilstetten announced that Benedek would join their team on loan for 1 year from the summer. At the end of the season, HBW Balingen-Weilstetten was relegated from the Handball-Bundesliga, so Benedek started the 2024/25 season in the 2. Handball-Bundesliga. The team surprisingly finished 3rd in the DHB-Pokal after defeating the Rhein-Neckar Löwen team. He also spent the 2025/2026 season with HBW Balingen-Weilstetten in 2. Handball-Bundesliga. He joined the Spanish team BM Atlético Valladolid permanently in the summer of 2026.

=== National team ===
He was 5th with the Hungarian team at the 2019 World Youth Championship. He was included in the large squad of the 2025 World Men's Handball Championship, but in the end he will not become a member of the narrow squad. He made his debut for the Hungarian men's adult national team on May 11, 2025, in Nagykanizsa, in a European Championship qualifying match against Finland, where the Hungarian national team defeated the Finland national team 37–24. He was included in the large squad of the 2026 European Men's Handball Championship, but in the end he will not become a member of the narrow squad.

=== Club ===
MOL Tatabánya KC

- Nemzeti Bajnokság I
  - Bronze: 2023

HBW Balingen-Weilstetten

- DHB-Pokal
  - Bronze: 2025
