= PLER KC =

PLER-Budapest
- Full name: Pestszentlőrinc-Elektromos-Rév Kézilabda Club
- Short name: PLER
- Founded: 1986; 40 years ago
- Arena: Budapest Airport Aréna, Budapest
- Capacity: 1,000
- President: László Németh
- Head coach: Sándor Lepsényi
- League: Nemzeti Bajnokság I
- Club colours
Home	Away

Pestszentlőrinc-Elektromos-Rév Kézilabda Club is a Hungarian men's professional handball club from Pestszentlőrinc, Budapest, that plays in the Nemzeti Bajnokság I, the top level championship in Hungary.

Location of PLER-Budapest

== Crest, colours, supporters ==
=== Naming history ===
Name	Period
Pestlőrinc SC	1986–1990
Pestszentlőrinc SC	1990–1991
Zöldi Pestszentlőrinc SC	1991–1992
Pestszentlőrinc SC	1992–1999
LRI Malév Pestszentlőrinc	1999–2000
Pestlőrinc-LRI Malév-Elektromos	2000–2001
Pestszentlőrinc-Elektromos	2001–2003
Pestszentlőrinc-Elektromos-Rév	2003–2004
PLER-Airport	2004–2006
PLER-Airport KC	2006–2007
PLER KC	2007–2011
FTC-PLER Budapest	2011–2013
PLER-Budapest	2013–present

=== Club crest ===
Old Logo
(-2023)

New Logo
(2023-present)

=== Kits ===
HOME
2018–20	2020–21	Craft; 2023–25

AWAY
2017–18	2018–20	2020–21	Craft; 2023–25

== Sports Hall information ==
- Name: – Budapest Airport Aréna
- City: – Budapest, XVIII. ker
- Capacity: – 1000
- Address: – 1188 Budapest Thököly út 5.

== Team ==
=== Current squad ===
Squad for the 2026–27 season

PLER-Budapest

Goalkeepers

- 1 (Hungary) Dániel Bősz
- 12 (Hungary) Zoltán Kránitz
- 82 (Hungary) Szabolcs Gulyás

Left Wingers

- 4 (Hungary) Martin Fodor
- 33 (Hungary) Vince Barna
- 95 (Hungary) Máté Menyhárt

Right Wingers

- 17 (Hungary) Ádám Tóth
- 24 (Hungary) Szabolcs Szkokán
- 53 (Hungary) Gergő Farkas

Line Players

- 3 (Hungary) László Kemény (c)
- 19 (Hungary) Márk Hegedűs
- 26 (Hungary) Lőrinc Várszegi
- 72 (Hungary) Zsombor Gáspár
- 88 (Hungary) Milán Deák

Central Backs

- 2 (Bosnia and Herzegovina) Milan Vukšić
- 7 (Hungary) Ádám Fekete
- 15 (Hungary) Mátyás Kavin
- 18 (Hungary) Bulcsú Hován

Left Backs

- 11 (Slovenia) Gregor Ocvirk
- 51 (Hungary) Tamás Borsos
- 69 (Austria) József Albek
- 81 (Slovakia) Jakub Mikita

Right Backs

- 74 (Hungary) Marcó Moczó
- 77 (Serbia) Mitar Markez

=== Technical staff ===
- Head coach: (Hungary) Sándor Lepsényi
- Assistant coach: (Hungary) Ádám Tamás
- Goalkeeping coach: (Bosnia and Herzegovina) (Hungary) Haris Porobic
- Masseur: (Hungary) Katalin Bódy
- Club doctor: (Hungary) Dr. Balázs Előd Szabó

=== Transfers ===
Transfers for the 2026–27 season

Joining

- (Hungary) Márk Hegedűs (LP) from (Hungary) HE-DO B. Braun Gyöngyös
- (Hungary) Tamás Borsos (LB) from (Hungary) Carbonex-Komló
- (Hungary) Máté Menyhárt (LW) from (Hungary) Carbonex-Komló
- (Hungary) Szabolcs Gulyás (GK) from (Hungary) NEKA

Leaving

- (Slovenia) Luka Groff (LB) (retires)
- (Hungary) Bálint Pordán (LP) (retires)
- (Hungary) Máté Borsos (GK) on loan at (Hungary) NEKA
- (Hungary) (Serbia) Stefan Sunajko (LW)
- (Hungary) Szabolcs Győri (LW)
- (Hungary) Balázs Zalai (RW)
- (Hungary) János Dénes (LP)
- (Hungary) Nándor Bognár (LP)
- (Hungary) Csongor Várszegi (LB) on loan at (Hungary) Dabas KK
- (Hungary) Marcell Stramszky (CB) on loan at (Hungary) Dabas KK

Transfers for the 2025–26 season

Joining

- (Bosnia and Herzegovina) Milan Vukšić (CB) from (Bosnia and Herzegovina) RK Izviđač
- (Serbia) Mitar Markez (RB) from (Hungary) HE-DO B. Braun Gyöngyös
- (Slovakia) Jakub Mikita (LB) from (Hungary) Ferencvárosi TC
- (Hungary) Ádám Tóth (RW) from (Hungary) Ferencvárosi TC
- (Hungary) Dániel Bősz (GK) from (Hungary) Győri ETO-UNI FKC
- (Austria) (Hungary) József Albek (LB) from (Greece) Athinaikos H.C.

Leaving

- (Bosnia and Herzegovina) Dejan Malinović (RB) (retires)
- (Hungary) (Serbia) Filip Sunajko (CB) to (Germany) TG Landshut
- (Hungary) Bence Holdosi (LW)
- (Hungary) Ákos Takács (GK) to (Hungary) Budakalász FKC
- (Hungary) Dániel Sztraka (CB) loan back to (Hungary) MOL Tatabánya KC

Transfers for the 2024–25 season

Joining

- (Slovenia) Rok Zaponšek (GK) from (Slovenia) RK Celje
- (Slovenia) Gregor Ocvirk (LB) from (United Arab Emirates) Al Ain Handball SC
- (Montenegro) Ivan Perišić (RB) from (Montenegro) RK Lovćen
- (Hungary) Bálint Pordán (LP) from (Hungary) Ferencvárosi TC
- (Hungary) László Kemény (LP) from (Hungary) Balatonfüredi KSE
- (Hungary) János Dénes (LP) from (Hungary) Balatonfüredi KSE
- (Hungary) Balázs Boros (RB) from (Hungary) QHB-Eger
- (Hungary) Mátyás Kavin (CB) from (Hungary) QHB-Eger
- (Hungary) Milán Deák (LP) from (Hungary) Kecskeméti TE
- (Hungary) (Serbia) Stefan Sunajko (LW) from (Serbia) RK Vojvodina
- (Bosnia and Herzegovina) Dejan Malinović (RB) from (Hungary) Balatonfüredi KSE
- (Hungary) Nándor Bognár (LP) from (Hungary) Dabas KK
- (Hungary) Máté Borsos (GK) back from loan at (Hungary) Szigetszentmiklósi KSK
- (Hungary) Dániel Sztraka (CB) on loan from (Hungary) MOL Tatabánya KC

Leaving

- (Hungary) Ádám Tóth (RW) to (Hungary) Ferencvárosi TC
- (Hungary) Mátyás Simotics (LP) to (Hungary) Balatonfüredi KSE
- (Croatia) Bruno-Vili Zobec (RB) to (Slovenia) RD Slovan
- (Hungary) Dániel Gajdos (LP) to (Hungary) Veszprémi KKFT
- (Hungary) Máté Vízler (LW) to (Hungary) Rákosmenti KSK
- (Montenegro) Božo Anđelić (CB) to (Israel) Maccabi Tel Aviv
- (Poland) Ignacy Bąk (RB)
- (Hungary) Tamás Farkas (LB)
- (Montenegro) Vuk Lakićević (RB)
- (Croatia) Alan Javor (CB)
- (Tunisia) Khalil Mohamed Chaouachi (LP) to (Kosovo) KH Besa Famgas
- (Serbia) Mitar Markez (RB) loan back to (Hungary) Csurgói KK
- (Hungary) Ákos Takács (GK) on loan at (Hungary) Vecsési SE
- (Hungary) Balázs Boros (RB) to (Hungary) Szigetszentmiklósi KSK
- (Montenegro) Ivan Perišić (RB)
- (Slovenia) Rok Zaponšek (GK) to (Slovenia) RD Slovan

Transfers for the 2023–24 season

Joining

- (Poland) Ignacy Bąk (RB) from (Germany) Wilhelmshavener HV
- (Croatia) Alan Javor (CB) from (Slovenia) RK Krško
- (Croatia) Bruno-Vili Zobec (RB) from (Hungary) Sport36-Komló
- (Ukraine) Serhii Petrychenko (LP) from (Czech Republic) HK Lovosice
- (Ukraine) Maxym Strelnikov (LB) from (Switzerland) CS Chênois Genève
- (Hungary) (Serbia) Filip Sunajko (CB) from (Hungary) Sport36-Komló
- (Hungary) Ádám Tóth (RW) from (Hungary) Csurgói KK
- (Hungary) Zoltán Kránitz (GK) from (Hungary) Ceglédi KKSE
- (Hungary) Péter Ács (CB) from (Hungary) NEKA
- (Hungary) Bence Holdosi (LW) from (Hungary) Budai Farkasok KKUK
- (Hungary) Dániel Gajdos (LP) from (Hungary) Tatai AC
- (Hungary) Szabolcs Szkokán (RW) from (Hungary) Szigetszentmiklósi KSK
- (Germany) Christian Dissinger (LB) from (Qatar) Al Duhail
- (Montenegro) Božo Anđelić (CB) from (Kuwait) Al-Qurain SC
- (Tunisia) Khalil Mohamed Chaouachi (LP) from (Tunisia) Club Africain
- (Slovenia) Luka Groff (LB) from (Slovenia) RK Koper
- (Serbia) Mitar Markez (RB) on loan from (Hungary) Csurgói KK
- (Montenegro) Vuk Lakićević (RB) from (Montenegro) RK Lovćen

Leaving

- (Hungary) Balázs Boros (RB) to (Hungary) QHB-Eger
- (Hungary) Norbert Parzer (RB) to (Hungary) Szigetszentmiklósi KSK
- (Hungary) Bence Kovács (LB) to (Hungary) Mezőkövesdi KC
- (Hungary) Gábor Andorka (GK) to (Hungary) Rákosmenti KSK
- (Hungary) Máté Borsos (GK) on loan at (Hungary) Szigetszentmiklósi KSK
- (Hungary) Péter Ács (CB) to (Hungary) Sport36-Komló
- (Ukraine) Maxym Strelnikov (LB) to (Poland) Chrobry Głogów
- (Ukraine) Serhii Petrychenko (LP) to (Slovakia) MŠK Považská Bystrica
- (Germany) Christian Dissinger (LB) to (Hungary) MOL Tatabánya KC
- (Hungary) Dániel Gajdos (LP) on loan at (Hungary) Tatai AC
- (Croatia) Bruno-Vili Zobec (RB) on loan at (Hungary) Csurgói KK

Transfers for the 2021–22 season

Joining

- (Hungary) Attila Tóth (RB) from (Hungary) Veszprém KKFT Felsőörs
- (Hungary) Benedek Szakály (RW) from (Hungary) Veszprém KKFT Felsőörs
- (Hungary) András Schekk (LB) from (Hungary) Tatai AC
- (Hungary) Dávid Foki (CB) from (Hungary) NEKA
- (Hungary) Balázs Márton (LB) from (Hungary) KK Ajka

Leaving

- (Hungary) Dániel Takó (RB) to (Hungary) Orosházi FKSE
- (Hungary) Sándor Bak (CB)

Transfers for the 2020–21 season

Joining

- (Hungary) Kevin Rozner (RW) from (Hungary) Váci KSE
- (Hungary) Máté Vízler (LW) from (Hungary) Nyíregyházi SC

Leaving

- (Hungary) Adrián Cseh (RW) to (Hungary) Vecsési SE
- (Hungary) Kerim Khalil (LP) to (Hungary) BFKA-Veszprém U22

Transfers for the 2019–20 season

Joining

- (Hungary) Tamás Farkas (LB) from (Hungary) Csurgói KK
- (Hungary) Dániel Takó (RB) from (Hungary) Vecsési SE

Leaving

- (Hungary) Máté Nagy (LW) to (Hungary) Kecskeméti TE
- (Hungary) Bence Papp (RB) to (Hungary) Gyöngyösi KK
- (Hungary) Krisztián Rédai (LB) to (Hungary) Váci KSE
- (Hungary) Balázs Márton (LB) to (Hungary) Szigetszentmiklósi KSK
- (Hungary) Csaba Bella (CB) to (Hungary) Orosházi FKSE
- (Hungary) Márió Horvácki (CB) loan back to (Hungary) Váci KSE

Transfers for the 2018–19 season

Joining

- (Hungary) Gábor Grebenár (LB) from (Hungary) Ferencvárosi TC
- (Hungary) Máté Nagy (LW) from (Hungary) Ferencvárosi TC
- (Hungary) Krisztián Rédai (LB) from (Hungary) Ferencvárosi TC
- (Hungary) Adrián Cseh (RW) from (Hungary) Ferencvárosi TC
- (Hungary) Gábor Andorka (GK) from (Hungary) Veszprém KKFT Felsőörs
- (Hungary) Balázs Márton (LB) from (Hungary) Veszprém KKFT Felsőörs
- (Hungary) Csaba Bella (CB) from (Hungary) Orosházi FKSE
- (Hungary) Bence Papp (RB) from (Hungary) NEKA
- (Hungary) Bálint Jónás (GK) from (Hungary) NEKA
- (Hungary) Dávid Turcsán (RW) from (Hungary) Balatonfüredi KSE
- (Hungary) Márió Horvácki (CB) on loan from (Hungary) Váci KSE

Leaving

- (Hungary) Zoltán Kránitz (GK) to (Hungary) Vecsési SE
- (Hungary) Máté Vízler (LW) to (Hungary) Vecsési SE
- (Hungary) Szabolcs Nagy (LB) to (Hungary) Csurgói KK
- (Hungary) Tamás Farkas (LB) to (Hungary) Csurgói KK
- (Hungary) Ádám Bujtár (RW) to (Hungary) Pécsi VSE
- (Hungary) Bence Holdosi (LW) to (Hungary) Ferencvárosi TC
- (United States) (Hungary) Pál Merkovszki (GK) to (Hungary) Ferencvárosi TC
- (Hungary) Benjamin Vízi (LB) to (Switzerland) HC Einsiedeln
- (Hungary) Norman Tóth (GK)
- (Hungary) Zoltán Terenyi (RW)
- (Hungary) Richárd Bendegúz Mezei (RB) to (Hungary) FKSE Algyő

Transfers for the 2017–18 season

Joining

- (Hungary) Sándor Bak (CB) from (Hungary) Ferencvárosi TC
- (Hungary) Ádám Bujtár (RW) from (Hungary) Sport36-Komló
- (Hungary) Zoltán Terenyi (RW) from (Hungary) ETO-SZESE Győr
- (Hungary) Richárd Bendegúz Mezei (RB) from (Hungary) Békési FKC
- (Hungary) Hans Schmidt (LP) from (Hungary) Pénzügyőr SE
- (Hungary) Zoltán Patyi (CB) from (Hungary) MOL-Pick Szeged U23

Leaving

- (Hungary) Szabolcs Laurencz (RB) (retires)
- (Hungary) Botond Zelei (CB) to (Hungary) Mezőkövesdi KC
- (Hungary) István Gigler (RW) to (Hungary) Balassagyarmati Kábel SE
- (Hungary) Benjamin Sinkovits (RB) loan back to (Hungary) Balatonfüredi KSE
- (Hungary) Péter Keresztes (CB) loan back to (Hungary) Gyöngyösi KK

Transfers for the 2016–17 season

Joining

- (Hungary) Botond Zelei (CB) from (Hungary) SBS-Eger
- (Hungary) István Gigler (RW) from (Hungary) Mizse KC
- (Hungary) Dániel Horváth (LP) from (Hungary) Balmazújvárosi KK
- (Hungary) Péter Keresztes (CB) on loan from (Hungary) Gyöngyösi KK
- (Hungary) Benjamin Sinkovits (RB) on loan from (Hungary) Balatonfüredi KSE

Leaving

- (Slovakia) Matej Mikita (LB) to (Hungary) Gyöngyösi KK
- (Hungary) Csaba Leimeter (RB) to (Hungary) Grundfos Tatabánya KC
- (Hungary) György Bakos (CB) to (Hungary) Ferencvárosi TC
- (Hungary) Bendegúz Bujdosó (RW) to (Hungary) Ferencvárosi TC
- (Hungary) Mohamed Yassine Benmiloud (LP) to (Hungary) Ferencvárosi TC
- (Hungary) András Kocsi (LP) to (Hungary) Ferencvárosi TC
- (Hungary) Sándor Bohács (LW) to (Hungary) Budakalász FKC
- (Hungary) Tamás Boros (GK) to (Hungary) Budakalász FKC
- (Hungary) Zsolt Vasvári (GK) to (Hungary) Budakalász FKC
- (Hungary) Ákos Glück (RW) to (Hungary) Budakalász FKC
- (Hungary) Tamás Oláh (RB) to (Hungary) Orosházi FKSE
- (Hungary) Benjamin Sinkovits (RB) to (Hungary) Balatonfüredi KSE
- (Serbia) Bojan Rađenović (LW) loan back to (Hungary) Csurgói KK

Transfers for the 2015–16 season

Joining

- (Hungary) György Bakos (CB) from (Hungary) Gyöngyösi KK
- (Hungary) Bendegúz Bujdosó (RW) from (Hungary) Dabas KK
- (Hungary) Gergő Lókodi (LB) from (Hungary) Mezőkövesdi KC
- (Hungary) Tamás Oláh (RB) from (Hungary) Balmazújvárosi KK
- (Hungary) Mohamed Yassine Benmiloud (LP) from (Hungary) Orosházi FKSE
- (Hungary) Tamás Boros (GK) from (Hungary) Grundfos Tatabánya KC
- (Hungary) Szabolcs Nagy (LB) from (Hungary) Grundfos Tatabánya KC
- (Hungary) Norman Tóth (GK) from (Belgium) HC Visé BM
- (Serbia) Bojan Rađenović (LW) on loan from (Hungary) Csurgói KK

Leaving

- (Slovakia) Jakub Mikita (LB) to (Hungary) Csurgói KK
- (Hungary) Dániel Váczi (GK) to (Hungary) Budakalász FKC
- (Hungary) Sándor Bak (CB) to (Hungary) Ferencvárosi TC
- (Hungary) Krisztián Rédai (LB) to (Hungary) Gyöngyösi KK
- (Hungary) Márton Auth (LB) (retires)
- (Hungary) Ferenc Stranigg (LP)
- (Hungary) László Kemény (LP) loan back to (Hungary) Balatonfüredi KSE
- (Iran) Mohsen Babasafari (GK) loan back to (Hungary) Grundfos Tatabánya KC
- (Hungary) Norbert Gyene (RW) loan back to (Hungary) MKB-MVM Veszprém

Transfers for the 2014–15 season

Joining

- (Brazil) Alencar Cassiano Rossoni (LP) from (Hungary) Grundfos Tatabánya KC
- (Hungary) András Kocsi (LP) from (Hungary) Váci KSE
- (Hungary) Szabolcs Laurencz (RB) from (Hungary) Váci KSE
- (Hungary) Ferenc Stranigg (LP) from (Hungary) Gödöllői KC
- (Hungary) László Kemény (LP) on loan from (Hungary) Balatonfüredi KSE
- (Hungary) (Slovakia) Mihály Tóth (GK) on loan from (Hungary) MOL-Pick Szeged
- (Slovakia) Gabriel Vadkerti (CB) on loan from (Hungary) Csurgói KK
- (Hungary) Norbert Gyene (RW) on loan from (Hungary) MKB-MVM Veszprém
- (Iran) Mohsen Babasafari (GK) on loan from (Hungary) Grundfos Tatabánya KC

Leaving

- (Serbia) Milan Kuzman (LP)
- (Iran) Alireza Mousavi loan back to (Hungary) MKB-MVM Veszprém
- (Hungary) Bence Nagy (LB) to (Hungary) Gyöngyösi KK
- (Hungary) György Bakos (CB) to (Hungary) Gyöngyösi KK
- (Hungary) Máté Marczinkó (RB) to (Hungary) Gyöngyösi KK
- (Hungary) Robin Munkácsi (LP) to (Hungary) Gyöngyösi KK
- (Hungary) Ádám Tóth (RW) to (Hungary) Gyöngyösi KK
- (Hungary) András Koncz (CB) to (Hungary) Gyöngyösi KK
- (Hungary) Gergő Lókodi (LB) to (Hungary) Mezőkövesdi KC
- (Hungary) Tamás Oláh (RB) to (Hungary) Balmazújvárosi KK
- (Hungary) Mátyás Rév (RW) to (Hungary) Dabas KK
- (Hungary) János Vancsics (RW) to (Hungary) SBS-Eger
- (Hungary) Tamás Németh (LW) to (Germany) TV 08 Willstätt
- (Hungary) Tamás Szabó (GK) to (Germany) TSV Lohr
- (Slovakia) Gabriel Vadkerti (CB) loan back to (Hungary) Csurgói KK
- (Hungary) (Slovakia) Mihály Tóth (GK) loan back to (Hungary) MOL-Pick Szeged
- (Brazil) Alencar Cassiano Rossoni (LP)

Transfers for the 2013–14 season

Joining

- (Serbia) Milan Kuzman (LP) from (Hungary) SBS-Eger
- (Hungary) Tamás Németh (LW)
- (Hungary) Tamás Szabó (GK) from (Hungary) Balatonfüredi KSE
- (Hungary) Dávid Kaló (LP) from (Hungary) Füzesabonyi SC
- (Hungary) László Varga (LP) from (Hungary) Gödöllői KC
- (Hungary) Gergő Lókodi (LB) from (Hungary) Kecskeméti TE
- (Iran) Alireza Mousavi (LP) on loan from (Hungary) MKB-MVM Veszprém

Leaving

- (Slovakia) Teodor Paul (GK) to (Hungary) Grundfos Tatabánya KC
- (Slovakia) Martin Mazak (LP) to (Hungary) Grundfos Tatabánya KC
- (Slovakia) Tomáš Szűcs (LB) to (Hungary) Mezőkövesdi KC
- (Serbia) Darko Pavlović (LB) to (Hungary) Balmazújvárosi KK
- (Hungary) Márton Székely (GK) to (Hungary) Balatonfüredi KSE
- (Hungary) Péter Lendvay (CB) to (Hungary) Váci KSE
- (Hungary) András Kocsi (LP) to (Hungary) Váci KSE
- (Hungary) Szabolcs Laurencz (RB) to (Hungary) Váci KSE
- (Hungary) Gábor Pálos (LW) to (Hungary) SBS-Eger

== Previous squads ==
2018–2019 Team
Shirt No	Nationality	Player	Birth Date	Position
1	Hungary	Bálint Jónás	14 February 1999 (age 27)	Goalkeeper
2	Hungary	Sándor Bak	30 October 1991 (age 35)	Central Back
6	Hungary	Levente Illés	5 July 1999 (age 27)	Central Back
8	Hungary	Gábor Grebenár	17 August 1984 (age 42)	Left Back
11	Hungary	Richárd Bendegúz Mezei	28 November 1996 (age 29)	Right Back
12	Hungary	Gábor Andorka	11 October 1990 (age 36)	Goalkeeper
13	Hungary	Bence Papp	18 February 2000 (age 26)	Right Back
15	Hungary	Balázs Márton	9 June 1995 (age 31)	Left Back
16	Hungary	Ádám Balogh	6 November 1997 (age 29)	Goalkeeper
19	Hungary	Patrik Ferencz	10 June 1997 (age 29)	Left Winger
24	Hungary	Krisztián Rédai	29 July 1995 (age 31)	Left Back
30	Hungary	Csaba Bella	17 March 1997 (age 29)	Central Back
32	Hungary	Hans Johann Schmidt	19 May 1995 (age 31)	Line Player
34	Hungary	Márió Horvácki	15 February 1994 (age 32)	Central Back
59	Hungary	Dániel Gál	24 October 1999 (age 27)	Left Winger
66	Hungary	Máté Nagy	13 March 1986 (age 40)	Left Winger
77	Hungary	Dániel Horváth	16 December 1995 (age 30)	Line Player
88	Hungary	Adrián Cseh	17 August 1998 (age 28)	Right Winger
96	Hungary	Kerim Khalil	27 June 2000 (age 26)	Line Player
99	Hungary	Dávid Turcsán	11 July 1999 (age 27)	Right Winger

2014–2015 Team
Shirt No	Nationality	Player	Birth Date	Position
1	HungarySlovakia	Mihály Tóth	3 September 1992 (age 34)	Goalkeeper
2	Hungary	Sándor Bak	30 October 1991 (age 35)	Central Back
3	Hungary	László Kemény	23 February 1993 (age 33)	Line Player
5	Hungary	Norbert Gyene	18 April 1994 (age 32)	Right Winger
6	Hungary	András Kocsi	30 January 1985 (age 41)	Line Player
7	Hungary	Máté Csontos	7 June 1994 (age 32)	Left Back
10	Hungary	Patrik Tóth	14 February 1994 (age 32)	Central Back
12	Hungary	Zoltán Kránitz	22 March 1993 (age 33)	Goalkeeper
14	Hungary	Bence Uzonyi	27 July 1994 (age 32)	Right Back
15	Hungary	Csaba Leimeter	15 December 1994 (age 31)	Right Back
18	Slovakia	Gabriel Vadkerti	4 January 1985 (age 41)	Central Back
19	Hungary	Szabolcs Laurencz	19 December 1978 (age 47)	Right Back
20	Hungary	Ferenc Stranigg	23 November 1991 (age 34)	Line Player
21	Hungary	Krisztián Rédai	29 July 1995 (age 31)	Left Back
22	Hungary	Márton Auth	22 March 1992 (age 34)	Left Winger
26	Hungary	Dániel Váczi	23 August 1993 (age 33)	Goalkeeper
34	Hungary	Máté Vízler	23 May 1995 (age 31)	Left Winger
37	Iran	Mohsen Babasafari	28 June 1987 (age 39)	Goalkeeper
39	Hungary	Sándor Bohács	5 September 1994 (age 32)	Left Winger
71	Hungary	Benjamin Sinkovits	2 July 1996 (age 30)	Right Winger
81	Slovakia	Jakub Mikita	7 May 1993 (age 33)	Left Back
82	Slovakia	Matej Mikita	18 November 1994 (age 32)	Left Back
91	Ukraine	Henadiy Kucher	20 June 1991 (age 35)	Central Back
97	Hungary	Tamás Farkas	17 July 1997 (age 29)	Left Back

2011–2012 Team
Shirt No	Nationality	Player	Birth Date	Position
2	Hungary	Sándor Bak	30 October 1991 (age 35)	Central Back
4	Hungary	Csaba Bendó	30 November 1973 (age 52)	Right Winger
5	Hungary	György Bakos	28 May 1984 (age 42)	Left Winger
6	Hungary	Balázs Pozsgai	15 August 1987 (age 39)	Left Back
8	Hungary	Dániel Tóth	9 October 1992 (age 34)	Central Back
10	Hungary	Mátyás Rév	31 January 1984 (age 42)	Right Winger
11	Hungary	Péter Lendvay	15 September 1976 (age 50)	Central Back
12	Hungary	Márton Székely	2 January 1990 (age 36)	Goalkeeper
14	Hungary	Gábor Pálos	21 June 1985 (age 41)	Left Winger
15	Slovakia	Maros Balaz	22 October 1989 (age 37)	Right Back
16	Czech Republic	Jan Komínek	20 July 1981 (age 45)	Goalkeeper
17	Hungary	Gábor Hajdú	20 October 1989 (age 37)	Left Back
18	Hungary	András Kocsi	30 January 1985 (age 41)	Line Player
19	Hungary	Tamás Oláh	14 February 1993 (age 33)	Right Back
20	Hungary	Márton Auth	22 March 1992 (age 34)	Left Winger
21	Hungary	István Soproni	27 July 1993 (age 33)	Right Winger
22	Slovakia	Martin Mazak	14 April 1984 (age 42)	Line Player
23	Hungary	Máté Marczinkó	23 January 1991 (age 35)	Right Back
27	Hungary	Rudolf Faluvégi	9 January 1994 (age 32)	Left Back
52	Hungary	Csaba Horváth	29 February 1988 (age 38)	Line Player
77	Slovakia	Jakub Mikita	7 May 1993 (age 33)	Left Back
78	Hungary	Gergely Kis	11 August 1978 (age 48)	Left Back

2009–2010 Team
Shirt No	Nationality	Player	Birth Date	Position
1	Hungary	András Novák	9 September 1977 (age 49)	Goalkeeper
5	Hungary	György Bakos	28 May 1984 (age 42)	Left Winger
6	Hungary	Máté Lékai	16 June 1988 (age 38)	Central Back
7	Hungary	Szabolcs Kupi	30 May 1990 (age 36)	Central Back
8	Hungary	Ádám Korsós	28 April 1988 (age 38)	Central Back
9	Hungary	Zsolt Balogh	29 March 1989 (age 37)	Right Back
10	Hungary	Mátyás Rév	31 January 1984 (age 42)	Right Winger
11	Hungary	Péter Lendvay	15 September 1976 (age 50)	Central Back
12	Hungary	Márton Székely	2 January 1990 (age 36)	Goalkeeper
13	Hungary	Tibor Gazdag	7 August 1991 (age 35)	Left Winger
17	Hungary	Gyula Forgács	21 July 1974 (age 52)	Left Winger
18	Hungary	András Kocsi	30 January 1985 (age 41)	Line Player
19	Hungary	László Varga	19 August 1991 (age 35)	Line Player
20	Hungary	Bálint Pordán	12 October 1988 (age 38)	Line Player
21	Hungary	Gergely Pál	18 May 1985 (age 41)	Left Back
23	Hungary	Máté Munkácsi	11 January 1988 (age 38)	Right Winger
24	Hungary	Máté Marczinkó	23 January 1991 (age 35)	Right Back
29	Hungary	József Tóth	17 January 1980 (age 46)	Central Back
33	Hungary	Tamás Koller	30 September 1992 (age 34)	Left Back
55	Slovakia	Teodor Paul	22 April 1987 (age 39)	Goalkeeper
77	Slovakia	Jakub Mikita	7 May 1993 (age 33)	Left Back

== Top scorers ==
Season	Player	Apps/Goals
2022–2023	(Hungary) Bence Kovács	28/121

== Honours ==
Honours		No.	Years
League
Nemzeti Bajnokság I/B	Winners	1	1998–99
Nemzeti Bajnokság I/B	Runners-up	3	1997–98, 2018–19, 2022–23
Nemzeti Bajnokság I/B	Third Place	4	1995–96, 2016–17, 2017–18, 2021–22
Domestic Cups
Magyar Kupa	Runners-up	1	2010–11

== Recent seasons ==
As of 08/06/2025

- Seasons in Nemzeti Bajnokság I: 19
- Seasons in Nemzeti Bajnokság I/B: 16
- Seasons in Nemzeti Bajnokság II: 4

Season	Division	Pos.	Magyar kupa
1986	NB II Kelet	8th	
1987	NB II Kelet	4th	
1988–89	NB II Kelet	6th	
1989–90	NB II Kelet	1th	
1990–91	NB I/B Nyugat	9th	
1991–92	NB I/B Nyugat	8th	
1992–93	NB I/B Nyugat	9th	
1993–94	NB I/B Nyugat	10th	
1994–95	NB I/B Nyugat	6th	
1995–96	NB I/B Nyugat	3th	
1996–97	NB I/B Nyugat	7th	
1997–98	NB I/B Nyugat	2th	
1998–99	NB I/B Nyugat	1st	
1999-00	NB I	12th	
2000–01	NB I	4th	
2001–02	NB I	8th	
2002–03	NB I	9th	
2003–04	NB I	6th	
2004–05	NB I	5th	
2005–06	NB I	4th	
2006–07	NB I	4th	Third place
2007–08	NB I	4th	Fourth place
2008–09	NB I	4th	
2009–10	NB I	5th	Fourth place

Season	Division	Pos.	Magyar kupa
2010–11	NB I	9th	Finalist
2011–12	NB I	7th	
2012–13	NB I	5th	
2013–14	NB I	8th	
2014–15	NB I	10th	
2015–16	NB I	14th	Round 3
2016–17	NB I/B Nyugat	3th	Round 2
2017–18	NB I/B Nyugat	3th	Round 3
2018–19	NB I/B Kelet	2th	Round 3
2019–20	NB I/B Nyugat	Cancelled	
2020–21	NB I/B Nyugat	4th	Round 3
2021–22	NB I/B	3rd	
2022–23	NB I/B	2nd	
2023–24	NB I	11th	Round 5
2024–25	NB I	10th	Round 3

== Former club members ==
=== Notable former players ===
- (Hungary) György Bakos
- (Hungary) Mohamed Yassine Benmiloud
- (Hungary) Sándor Bohács (2010–2016)
- (Hungary) Bendegúz Bujdosó (2015–2016)
- (Hungary) Gábor Grebenár
- (Hungary) László Kemény
- (Hungary) András Koncz
- (Hungary) Szabolcs Laurencz
- (Hungary) Csaba Leimeter
- (Hungary) Péter Lendvay
- (Hungary) Péter Lukács (2009–2015)
- (Hungary) Bence Nagy
- (Hungary) Máté Nagy
- (Hungary) Kristóf Palasics (2016–2018)
- (Hungary) Gábor Pálos
- (Hungary) István Székely (2000–2002)
- (Hungary) Márton Székely
- (Hungary) Ádám Tóth
- (Hungary) (Slovakia) Mihály Tóth
- (Bosnia and Herzegovina) Milan Vukšić (2025–)
- (Brazil) Alencar Cassiano Rossoni
- (Germany) Christian Dissinger (2023)
- (Iran) Mohsen Babasafari
- (Iran) Alireza Mousavi
- (Slovenia) Rok Zaponšek (2024)
- (Slovakia) Martin Mazak
- (Slovakia) Jakub Mikita
- (Slovakia) Matej Mikita
- (Slovakia) Teodor Paul
- (Slovakia) Tomáš Szűcs
- (Slovakia) Gabriel Vadkerti
- (Serbia) Milan Kuzman
- (Serbia) Darko Pavlović
- (Serbia) Bojan Rađenović
