= Mitar Markez =

Serbian handball player (born 1990)

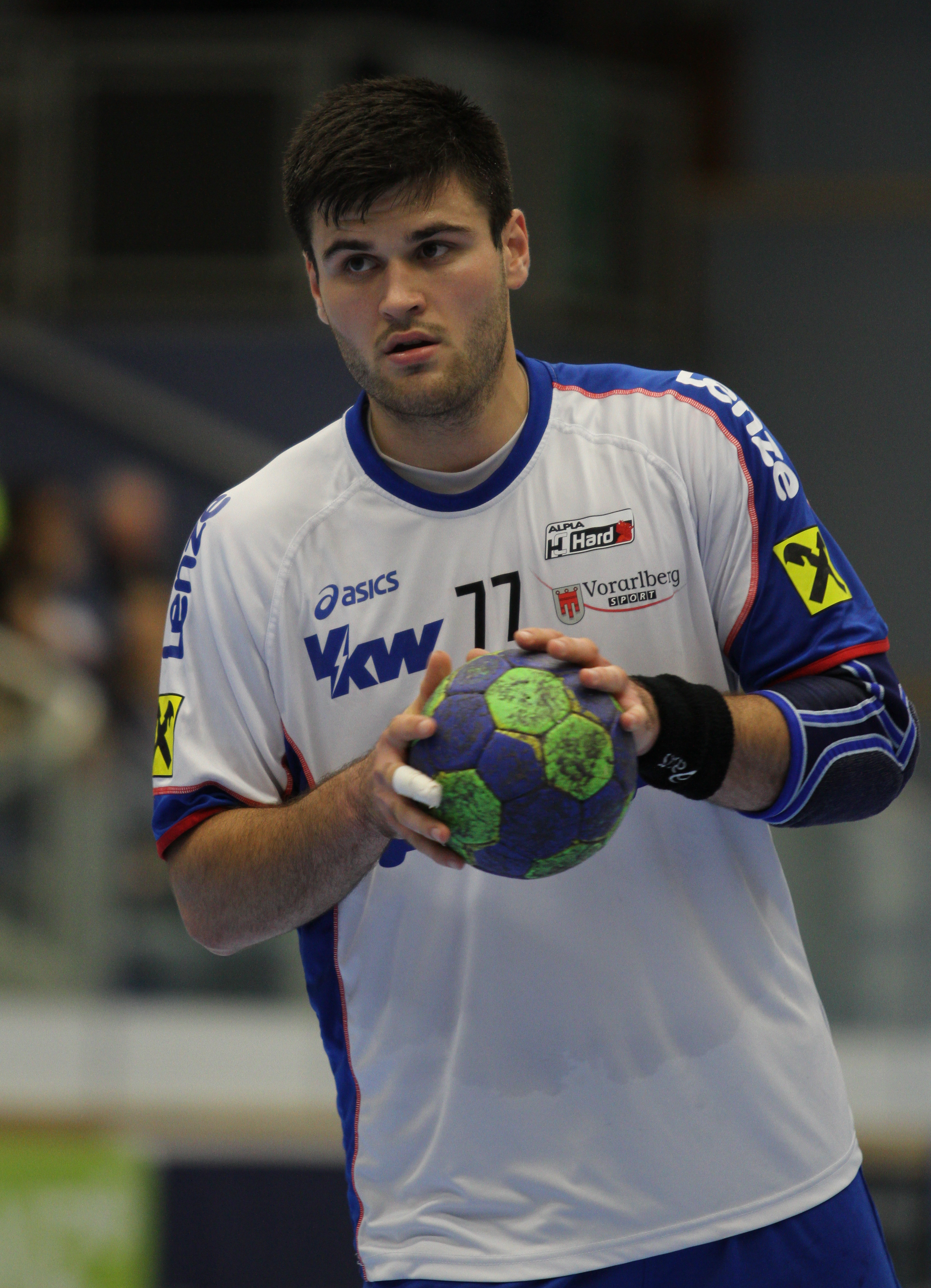
- Markez in 2014

Personal information
- Full name: Mitar Markez
- Nationality: Serbian
- Born: 25 October 1990 (age 35) Sombor, SFR Yugoslavia
- Height: 1.90 m (6 ft 3 in)

Sport
- Sport: Handball
- Position: Right back
- Current club: Gyöngyösi KK
- Number: 77

Senior clubs
- Years: Team
- –: RK Crvenka
- 2010–2011: Montpellier Handball
- 2011–2014: Frisch Auf Göppingen
- 2014: Alpla HC Hard
- 2015: Handball Sportunion Leoben
- 2015–2017: HC Odorheiu Secuiesc
- 2017–2022: Gyöngyösi KK
- 2022–2024: Csurgói KK
- 2024: → PLER-Budapest (loan)
- 2024–2025: Gyöngyösi KK
- 2025–: PLER-Budapest
National team
Years	Team	Apps	(Gls)
–	Serbia	7	(7)

Mitar Markez (Serbian Cyrillic: Митар Маркез; born 25 October 1990) is a Serbian handball player for Hungarian club Gyöngyösi KK and the Serbia national team.

== Club career ==
After starting out at Crvenka, Markez moved abroad to France and signed with Montpellier in 2010. He helped the team win the LNH Division 1 in the 2010–11 season. Between 2011 and 2014, Markez played for German team Frisch Auf Göppingen, winning the 2011–12 EHF Cup.

== International career ==
Markez was capped for Serbia at international level.

== Honours ==
Montpellier

- LNH Division 1: 2010–11

Frisch Auf Göppingen

- EHF Cup: 2011–12
