= Uroš Vilovski =

Serbian-Hungarian handball player (born 1984)

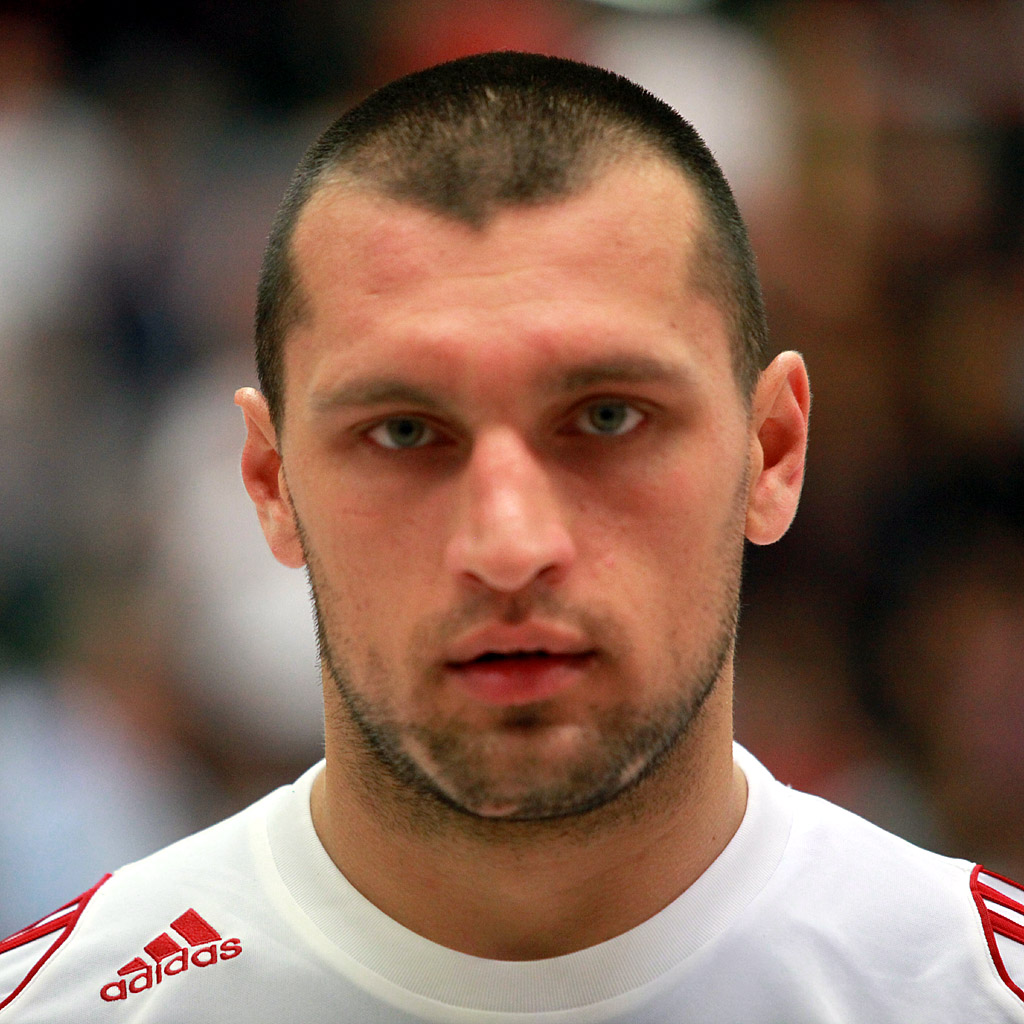
- Vilovski in 2010

Personal information
- Full name: Uroš Vilovski
- Nationality: Serbian / Hungarian
- Born: 25 February 1984 (age 42) Senta, SR Serbia, SFR Yugoslavia
- Height: 1.97 m (6 ft 6 in)

Sport
- Sport: Handball
- Position: Pivot
- Current club: Győri ETO-UNI FKC
- Number: 23

Senior clubs
- Years: Team
- –: Proleter Zrenjanin
- 2006–2015: MKB Veszprém
- 2006–2007: → Debreceni KSE (loan)
- 2007–2008: → Balatonfüredi KSE (loan)
- 2013: → Montpellier (loan)
- 2014–2015: → Balatonfüredi KSE (loan)
- 2015–2016: Minaur Baia Mare
- 2016: Al Qiyadah
- 2016–2017: Bergischer HC
- 2017–2018: Székelyudvarhelyi KC
- 2018: Minaur Baia Mare
- 2018–2022: Gyöngyösi KK
- 2022–2024: Tatabánya KC
- 2024–: Győri ETO-UNI FKC
National team
| Years | Team | | |
| 2009–2011 | Serbia | | |
| 2017–2018 | Hungary | 8 | (14) |
Medal record
Men's handball
Representing Serbia and Montenegro
U21 World Championship
| Silver medal – second place | 2005 Hungary | Team |
Representing Serbia
Mediterranean Games
| Gold medal – first place | 2009 Pescara | Team |

Uroš Vilovski (Serbian Cyrillic: Урош Виловски, Hungarian: Vilovszki Uros; born 25 February 1984) is a Serbian-Hungarian handball player for Hungarian club Győri ETO-UNI FKC.

== Club career ==
In his homeland, Vilovski played for Proleter Zrenjanin, before moving abroad to Hungary. He was signed by MKB Veszprém in 2006, spending the next two seasons on loan at Debreceni KSE (2006–07) and Balatonfüredi KSE (2007–08). Over the course of his career, Vilovski also played in France, Romania, Qatar and Germany.

== International career ==
Vilovski represented Serbia and Montenegro at the 2005 World Under-21 Championship, as the team finished as runners-up.

At senior level, Vilovski represented Serbia at the 2010 European Championship and 2011 World Championship. He later switched allegiance to Hungary and participated at the 2018 European Championship.

== Honours ==
MKB Veszprém

- Nemzeti Bajnokság I: 2008–09, 2009–10, 2010–11, 2011–12, 2013–14
- Magyar Kupa: 2008–09, 2009–10, 2010–11, 2011–12, 2013–14
