= Dino Hamidović =

Bosnian handball player

Personal information
- Born: 11 July 1996 (age 30) Gračanica, Bosnia and Herzegovina
- Height: 1.95 m (6 ft 5 in)

Sport
- Sport: Handball
- Position: Left back
- Current club: RK Gračanica
- Number: 15
National team
Years	Team	Apps	(Gls)
–	Bosnia and Herzegovina	6	(10)

Dino Hamidović (born 11 July 1996) is a Bosnian handball player for RK Gračanica and the Bosnian national team.

He represented Bosnia and Herzegovina at the 2020 European Men's Handball Championship.
