= Dávid Ubornyák =

Hungarian handballer (born 1998)

Personal information
- Nationality: Hungarian
- Born: 8 September 1998 (age 28) Szabadszállás, Hungary
- Height: 1.86 m (6 ft 1 in)

Sport
- Sport: Handball
- Position: Centre back
- Current club: Tatabánya KC
- Number: 8
National team
Years	Team	Apps	(Gls)
2020–	Hungary	9	(2)

Dávid Ubornyák (born 8 September 1998) is a Hungarian handball player for Tatabánya KC and the Hungarian national team.

He represented Hungary at the 2020 European Men's Handball Championship.
