= Tatabánya KC =

Hungarian handball club

MOL Tatabánya KC
- Full name: MOL Tatabánya Kézilabda Club
- Nickname: Bányász
- Short name: Tatabánya
- Founded: 1942; 84 years ago
- Arena: Tatabányai Multifunkcionális Sportcsarnok, Tatabánya
- Capacity: 6,200
- President: László Marosi
- Head coach: Edmond Tóth
- Captain: Márton Székely
- League: Nemzeti Bajnokság I
- 2025–26: Nemzeti Bajnokság I, 3rd of 14
- Club colours
Home	Away

Tatabánya Kézilabda Club is a Hungarian team handball club from Tatabánya, that plays in the Nemzeti Bajnokság I, the top level championship in Hungary.

The current name of the club is MOL Tatabánya KC due to sponsorship reasons.

Location of MOL Tatabánya KC

== History ==
=== Early history ===
In Tatabánya, handball boasts a long history. The game took place in an organized form from 1942, within the framework of the Tatabányai Bányász Sport Club (TBSC). The transition from the big field to the small field handball, which was ordered by the Hungarian Handball Association (MKSZ) at the end of 1959, was a fundamental change. Tatabánya could start its new role in the Western Group of NB II. In 1966, TBSC became the champion in the Western Group of NB II, allowing him to start at the forefront. The members of the NB II champion team included Alfréd Antalóczy, Vilmos Drobnits and Sándor Kaló. At the end of the season, with only a worse goal difference, they were eliminated from Nemzeti Bajnokság I. Sándor Kaló became the top scorer with 160 goals. The association (MKSZ) first announced the single-group NB I/B championship in 1968, which was won by the TBSC with a great advantage and was able to be included in Nemzeti Bajnokság I again. From here, the "golden age" of the Tatabánya KC team lasted more than twenty years.

=== Golden age ===
In 1969, TBSC made history in Hungarian handball, as it was the first rural team to win the Hungarian Cup. The members of the cup winning team: László Szabó, Ferenc Sándor (goalkeepers), Sándor Kaló, Lajos Simó, László Katona, Ernő Bakonyi, Tibor Bognár, László Fekete, Antal Schalkhammer, Imre Molnár, Alfréd Antalóczy, László Vörös. In 1974, Tatabánya KC became the first small-scale champion in the history of Hungarian men's handball, breaking the hegemony of the capital. The members of the championship team: László Szabó, Ferenc Sándor (goalkeepers), Ernő Gubányi, László Katona, Lajos Simó, Sándor Kaló, László Fekete, Pál Pavelka, Lajos Mészáros, József Bognár, Mihály Hegedűs, Ottó Szigeti, Ernő Bakonyi, Jenő Flasch (died on 25 May 2025). In 1978, Tatabánya KC became the champion for the second time and also won the Hungarian Cup for the second time. The members of the team: Béla Bartalos, László Szabó (goalkeepers), Sándor Kaló, József Bognár, Gyula Básti, László Katona, Lajos Mészáros, Ernő Gubányi, Jenő Flasch, Árpád Pál, Lajos Pánovics, Zsolt Kontra, József Hernicz, László Bábos. The club won the championship twice more: in 1979 and 1984. Members of the 1984 championship team: László Hoffmann, Lajos Vincze (goalkeepers), László Bábos, József Bognár, Gyula Básti, Jenő Flasch, Tamás Füredi, Ferenc Füzesi, Ernő Gubányi, Antal Kanyó, Zsolt Kontra, László Marosi, Antal Nagy, Árpád Pál, Jakab Sibalin, István Wohner.

=== 1990's ===
The fact of the redevelopment or closure of the Tatabánya Coal Mines was felt in 1990: salaries and other benefits became more and more limited. László Marosi, the six-time goal king of TBSC, has been certified for the German Bundesliga team, TBV Lemgo. The following year, the staffing of the team underwent a huge change. Nine key players left and still could not retain their place in the top class. The Tatabánya KC presidency gave the team one year under similar conditions to return to Nemzeti Bajnokság I. The team took the opportunity to win the 1992/93 NB I/B Championship unbeaten in their group and were at the forefront again. The team commuted up and down for a while between the first and second divisions.

=== 2000's and 2010's ===
In 2001, László Marosi, a world-class handball player, became the managing director of Tatabánya KC. This team returned to Nemzeti Bajnokság I in 2002. In the 2009/10 season, the team won a bronze medal in the league after many years. In his ranks with players such as Ivo Díaz, Gyula Gál, Gergely Harsányi, Máté Halász, Gábor Szente.

== Crest, colours, supporters ==
=== Naming history ===
Name	Period
Tatabányai Bányász SC	−1992
Tatabányai SC	1992–1996
Tatabánya-Tatai Cserép KC	1996–2002
Tatabánya Carbonex KC	2002–2012
Grundfos Tatabánya KC	2012–2022
MOL Tatabánya KC	2022–present

=== Kit manufacturers and shirt sponsor ===
The following table shows in detail MOL Tatabánya Kézilabda Club kit manufacturers and shirt sponsors by year:

Kit manufacturers

Period	Kit manufacturer
2009–present	(Germany) Jako

Shirt sponsor

Period	Sponsor
2009–2011	Carbonex / Rottex / Vértes Volán
2011–2012	Carbonex
2012–2013	Grundfos / Carbonex / Vértes Volán
2013–2015	Grundfos
2015–2016	Grundfos / Szerencsejáték Zrt.
2016–2017	Grundfos / tippmixPro
2017–2019	Grundfos / tippmix
2019–2020	Grundfos / tippmix / rb / Tatabánya Erőmű Kft.
2020–2021	Grundfos / tippmix / rb / Fejér-B.Á.L Zrt.
2021–present	MOL / Grundfos / tippmix

=== Kits ===
HOME
2009–11	2011–12	2012–13	2014–15	2016–17	2017–18	2018–19	2019–20	2020–21	2021–22	2022–23	2023–24

AWAY
2004–05	2009–11	2011–12	2012–13	2014–15	2015–16	2016–17	2017–18	2018–19	2019–20	2020–21	2021–22	2022–

THIRD
2011–12	2012–13	2018–19	2019–20	2020–21	2021–22	2022–23	2023–24

== Sports Hall information ==
- Name: – Tatabányai Multifunkcionális Sportcsarnok
- City: – Tatabánya
- Capacity: – 6200
- Address: – 2800 Tatabánya, Olimpikon u.

== Management ==
Position	Name
President	(Hungary) László Marosi
Executive Director	(Hungary) Zoltán Németh
Professional Director Responsible For Youth	(Hungary) Gergely Szappanos
Technical manager	(Hungary) Zsolt Kontra
Economic Affairs	(Hungary) Tibor Bognár
Financial Assistant	(Hungary) Katalin Schmidt-Rembeczki
Sports Officer in Charge Of Youth	(Hungary) Ádám Kanyó
International Relations And Communication	(Hungary) Kata Székely-Marosi
Technical Manager Of Youth	(Hungary) Helga Csiaki
PR & Communications Manager	(Hungary) Lázár Bence Vankó

== Team ==
=== Current squad ===
Squad for the 2026–27 season

MOL Tatabánya KC

Goalkeepers

- 12 (Hungary) Márton Székely (c)
- 21 (Hungary) Arián Andó

Left Wingers

- 11 (France) Baptiste Damatrin
- 88 (Hungary) Robin Molnár

Right Wingers

- 7 (Hungary) Roland Terjék
- 26 (Hungary) Pedro Rodríguez Álvarez

Line Players

- 22 (Hungary) Tamás Papp
- 34 (Hungary) Miklós Karai
- 48 (Hungary) Bence Szűcs
- 78 (Hungary) Huba Vajda

Left Backs

- 9 (Hungary) Richárd Bodó
- 13 (Croatia) Josip Šarac
- 19 (Hungary) Benedek Éles

Central Backs

- 24 (Hungary) Dániel Sztraka
- 89 (Russia) Dmitry Zhitnikov
- 90 (Hungary) Levente Tóth

Right Backs

- 8 (Israel) Daniel Mosindi
- 25 (Hungary) Gábor Temesvári
- 30 (Romania) Demis Grigoras

=== Technical staff ===
- Head coach: (Hungary) Edmond Tóth
- Assistant coach: (Hungary) Károly Tóth
- Goalkeeping coach: (Hungary) Péter Nagy
- Fitness coach: (Hungary) Bence Kanyó
- Physiotherapist: (Hungary) Róbert Radnai
- Physiotherapist: (Hungary) Mónika Kemény
- Masseur: (Hungary) Gyula Kovács
- Club doctor: (Hungary) Dr. Zoltán Csőkör

=== Transfers ===
Transfers for the 2026–27 season

Joining

- (Hungary) Richárd Bodó (LB) from (Hungary) OTP Bank – Pick Szeged
- (Hungary) Bence Szűcs (LP) from (France) US Dunkerque HB
- (Hungary) Robin Molnár (LW) from (Hungary) ONE Veszprém
- (Hungary) Levente Tóth (CB) from (Hungary) NEKA
- (Hungary) Miklós Karai (LP) from (Hungary) Ferencvárosi TC

Leaving

- (North Macedonia) Filip Taleski (LB) to (North Macedonia) GRK Ohrid
- (Czech Republic) Matěj Havran (LB) to (Czech Republic) SKKP Handball Brno
- (Spain) Ignacio Plaza Jiménez (LP) to (Spain) CB Caserío Ciudad Real
- (Brazil) Patrick Lemos (CB) to (Brazil) Handebol Clube Português do Recife
- (Hungary) Bence Krakovszki (LW) to (Hungary) Győri ETO-UNI FKC

=== Transfer history ===
Transfers for the 2025–26 season

Joining

- (Russia) Dmitry Zhitnikov (CB) from (Poland) Wisła Płock
- (Croatia) Josip Šarac (LB) from (Germany) Frisch Auf Göppingen
- (Romania) Demis Grigoras (RB) from (Portugal) S.L. Benfica
- (Israel) Daniel Mosindi (RB) from (France) Cesson Rennes MHB
- (Hungary) Tamás Papp (LP) from (Hungary) Csurgói KK
- (Hungary) Huba Vajda (LP) from (Hungary) Győri ETO-UNI FKC
- (Hungary) Arián Andó (GK) from (Hungary) Balatonfüredi KSE
- (Hungary) Roland Terjék (RW) from (France) Montpellier Handball
- (Hungary) Gábor Temesvári (RB) from (Hungary) NEKA
- (Hungary) Balázs Hoffmann (LW) from (Hungary) Veszprém Handball Academy U21
- (Hungary) Marko Eklemović (CB) back from loan at (Hungary) NEKA
- (Hungary) Dániel Sztraka (CB) back from loan at (Hungary) PLER-Budapest
- (North Macedonia) Filip Taleski (LB) from (North Macedonia) RK Vardar

Leaving

- (Croatia) Mateo Maraš (RB) to (France) Paris Saint-Germain
- (Germany) Christian Dissinger (LB) to (Hungary) Győri ETO-UNI FKC
- (Japan) Yuga Enomoto (RW) to (Serbia) RK Vojvodina
- (Serbia) Milan Golubović (RB) to (Austria) HSG Bärnbach/Köflach
- (France) Sadou Ntanzi (CB) to (Qatar) Al Arabi SC
- (Hungary) László Bartucz (GK) to (Germany) MT Melsungen
- (Hungary) Attila Radvánszki (GK) to (Hungary) OTP Bank – Pick Szeged
- (Hungary) Péter Marcsek (LP) to (Hungary) Carbonex-Komló
- (Hungary) Balázs Hoffmann (LW) on loan at (Hungary) Szigetszentmiklósi KSK
- (Hungary) Marko Eklemović (CB) to (Hungary) Győri ETO-UNI FKC

Transfers for the 2024–25 season

Joining

- (Czech Republic) Matěj Havran (LB) from (Czech Republic) HC Zubří
- (France) Sadou Ntanzi (CB) from (France) Paris Saint-Germain
- (France) Baptiste Damatrin (LW) from (France) HBC Nantes
- (Spain) Ignacio Plaza Jiménez (LP) from (Portugal) FC Porto
- (Brazil) Patrick Lemos (CB) from (Greece) AEK Athens
- (Serbia) Milan Golubović (RB) from (Serbia) RK Vojvodina
- (Poland) Damian Przytuła (LB) from (Poland) Górnik Zabrze
- (Hungary) Attila Radvánszki (GK) from (Hungary) OTP Bank – Pick Szeged U21
- (Hungary) Péter Marcsek (LP) from (Hungary) Balatonfüredi KSE
- (Hungary) Dániel Sztraka (CB) from (Hungary) NEKA
- (Hungary) Benedek Éles (LB) from (Germany) GWD Minden

Leaving

- (Spain) Cristian Ugalde (LW) (retires)
- (Hungary) Mátyás Győri (CB) to (Hungary) Ferencvárosi TC
- (Hungary) Gábor Ancsin (RB) to (Hungary) Ferencvárosi TC
- (Hungary) (Serbia) Uroš Vilovski (LP) to (Hungary) Győri ETO-UNI FKC
- (Hungary) Huba Vajda (LP) to (Hungary) Győri ETO-UNI FKC
- (Bosnia and Herzegovina) Josip Perić (CB) to (Greece) Olympiacos
- (Hungary) Ádám Juhász (CB) to (Hungary) Budakalász FKC
- (Hungary) Andrej Pergel (LB) to (Spain) BM Logroño La Rioja
- (Hungary) Mihály Bacsi (GK) to (Hungary) Ózdi KC
- (Hungary) Dániel Sztraka (CB) on loan at (Hungary) PLER-Budapest
- (Iran) Reza Yadegari (LB) on loan at (Hungary) QHB-Eger
- (Hungary) Marko Eklemović (CB) on loan at (Hungary) NEKA
- (Poland) Damian Przytuła (LB) to (Croatia) RK Zagreb
- (Hungary) Petar Topic (LP) to (Croatia) RK Zagreb

Transfers for the 2023–24 season

Joining

- (Hungary) Ádám Juhász (CB) from (Portugal) S.L. Benfica
- (Hungary) László Bartucz (GK) from (Hungary) HE-DO B. Braun Gyöngyös
- (Hungary) Marko Eklemović (CB) from (Hungary) BFKA-Veszprém
- (Hungary) Huba Vajda (LP) from (Hungary) Balatonfüredi KSE
- (Hungary) Bence Krakovszki (LW) from (Hungary) NEKA
- (Japan) Yuga Enomoto (RB) from (Hungary) Budai Farkasok KKUK
- (Hungary) (Iran) Iman Jamali (LB) from (Hungary) Ceglédi KKSE
- (Iran) Reza Yadegari (LB) from (Iran) Mes Kerman
- (Germany) Christian Dissinger (LB) from (Hungary) PLER-Budapest

Leaving

- (Hungary) Dávid Ubornyák (CB) to (Hungary) HE-DO B. Braun Gyöngyös
- (Hungary) Márk Bodor (LB) to (Hungary) HE-DO B. Braun Gyöngyös
- (Hungary) (United States) Olivér Edwards (LW) to (Hungary) HE-DO B. Braun Gyöngyös
- (Hungary) Bence Hornyák (RW) to (Hungary) Fejér B.Á.L. Veszprém
- (Hungary) Ádám Bodnár (CB) to (Hungary) Kecskeméti TE
- (Hungary) Miron Paizs (RW) to (Hungary) Kecskeméti TE
- (Hungary) Benedek Nagy (GK) loan back to (Hungary) Telekom Veszprém
- (Hungary) Marko Eklemović (CB) on loan at (Hungary) Tatai AC
- (Hungary) (Iran) Iman Jamali (LB) to (Lebanon) Shabab Haret Saida
- (Serbia) Nemanja Obradović (LB) to (Serbia) RK Partizan
- (Hungary) Kolen Krancz (LP) to (Germany) HC Erlangen II

Transfers for the 2022–23 season

Joining

- (Hungary) Márton Székely (GK) from (North Macedonia) RK Eurofarm Pelister
- (Hungary) Benedek Nagy (GK) on loan from (Hungary) Telekom Veszprém
- (Spain) Cristian Ugalde (LW) from (Greece) AEK Athens
- (Serbia) Nemanja Obradović (LB) from (North Macedonia) RK Eurofarm Pelister
- (Hungary) Andrej Pergel (LB) on loan from (Hungary) Telekom Veszprém
- (Bosnia and Herzegovina) Josip Perić (CB) from (North Macedonia) RK Eurofarm Pelister
- (Hungary) Dávid Ubornyák (CB) from (Hungary) HE-DO B. Braun Gyöngyös
- (Croatia) Mateo Maraš (RB) from (North Macedonia) RK Eurofarm Pelister
- (Hungary) Pedro Rodríguez Álvarez (RW) from (Hungary) Balatonfüredi KSE
- (Hungary) Uroš Vilovski (LP) from (Hungary) HE-DO B. Braun Gyöngyös
- (Hungary) Petar Topic (LP) from (Hungary) Balatonfüredi KSE

Leaving

- (Hungary) László Bartucz (GK) to (Hungary) HE-DO B. Braun Gyöngyös
- (Poland) Piotr Wyszomirski (GK) to (Poland) Górnik Zabrze
- (Hungary) (Serbia) Stefan Sunajko (LW) to (Serbia) RK Dinamo Pančevo
- (Hungary) Dávid Fekete (LW) to (Hungary) Százhalombattai KE
- (Hungary) Bence Zdolik (LB) to (Hungary) Dabas KK
- (Hungary) Bence Bálint (LB) to (Hungary) Dabas KK
- (Slovakia) Lukáš Urban (LB) to (Slovakia) HT Tatran Prešov
- (Romania) Viorel Fotache (LB) to (Romania) CS Minaur Baia Mare
- (Hungary) Ádám Juhász (CB) to (Portugal) S.L. Benfica
- (Hungary) Zsolt Balogh (RB) to (Hungary) Ferencvárosi TC
- (Hungary) Péter Hornyák (RW) to (Hungary) Balatonfüredi KSE
- (Hungary) Barnabás Tóth (RW) to (Hungary) Tatai AC
- (Slovenia) Darko Stojnić (LP) to (Slovenia) RD Slovan
- (Belarus) Aliaksei Ushal (LP) to (Romania) CSM Bacău
- (Hungary) Nándor Bognár (LP) to (Hungary) Dabas KK
- (Hungary) Martin Perényi (GK) to (Hungary) Szigetszentmiklósi KSK
- (Hungary) Kolen Krancz (LP) on loan at (Hungary) Tatai AC
- (Hungary) Ádám Bodnár (CB) on loan at (Hungary) Tatai AC
- (Hungary) Miron Paizs (RW) on loan at (Hungary) Százhalombattai KE

Transfers for the 2021–22 season

Joining

- (Slovenia) Darko Stojnić (LP) from (Croatia) RK Zagreb
- (Belarus) Aliaksei Ushal (LP) from (Hungary) Orosházi FKSE
- (Romania) Viorel Fotache (LB) from (Romania) CSM București
- (Slovakia) Lukáš Urban (LB) from (France) C' Chartres MHB
- (Hungary) Márk Bodor (LB) on loan from (Hungary) Telekom Veszprém
- (Hungary) Dávid Fekete (LW) from (Hungary) Budakalász FKC

Leaving

- (Hungary) Adrián Sipos (LP) to (Hungary) Telekom Veszprém
- (Hungary) Ferenc Ilyés (LB) (retires)
- (Montenegro) Miloš Božović (LB) to (France) US Ivry Handball
- (Hungary) Dávid Debreczeni (LP) to (Hungary) Ferencvárosi TC
- (Slovakia) Michal Martin Konečný (GK) to (Spain) Ángel Ximénez Puente Genil
- (Hungary) Richárd Nemes (LP)
- (Hungary) Balázs Molnár (LW) to (Hungary) SBS-Eger

Transfers for the 2020–21 season

Joining

- (Poland) Piotr Wyszomirski (GK) from (Germany) TBV Lemgo
- (Hungary) Balázs Molnár (LW) from (Hungary) SBS-Eger
- (Serbia) (Hungary) Stefan Sunajko (LW) from (Sweden) IK Sävehof
- (Hungary) Bence Zdolik (LB) from (Hungary) Balatonfüredi KSE
- (Hungary) Bence Hornyák (RW) from (Hungary) Telekom Veszprém U21
- (Hungary) Dávid Debreczeni (LP) from (Hungary) Ferencvárosi TC
- (Hungary) Nándor Bognár (LP) from (Hungary) NEKA
- (Hungary) Richárd Nemes (LP) from (Hungary) Budakalász FKC
- (Slovakia) Michal Martin Konečný (GK) from (Slovakia) HKM Sala
- (Montenegro) Miloš Božović (LB) from (Croatia) RK Zagreb

Leaving

- (Montenegro) Miloš Božović (LB) to (Croatia) RK Zagreb
- (Hungary) Ádám Borbély (GK) to (Hungary) Veszprém KKFT Felsőörs
- (Hungary) Xavér Deményi (GK) to (Hungary) Ferencvárosi TC
- (Serbia) Jožef Holpert (LW) to (Hungary) Budakalász FKC
- (Montenegro) Miloš Vujović (LW) to (Germany) Füchse Berlin
- (Russia) Vitaly Komogorov (LB) to (Romania) HC Dobrogea Sud Constanța
- (Serbia) (Hungary) Uros Borzas (CB) to (France) Fenix Toulouse
- (Bosnia and Herzegovina) Marko Davidović (CB) to (Romania) CSM București
- (Hungary) Bence Ernei (LW) to (Hungary) Pécsi VSE
- (Hungary) Ákos Pásztor (RW) to (Hungary) Ceglédi KKSE
- (Hungary) János Dénes (LP) to (Hungary) Balatonfüredi KSE
- (Bosnia and Herzegovina) Vladimir Vranjes (LP) to (Belarus) HC Meshkov Brest
- (Romania) András Szász (LP) to (Romania) Dinamo București
- (Hungary) Nándor Bognár (LP) on loan at (Hungary) Tatai AC

Transfers for the 2019–20 season

Joining

- (Hungary) Zsolt Balogh (RB) from (Hungary) MOL-Pick Szeged
- (Hungary) Péter Hornyák (RW) from (Hungary) Balatonfüredi KSE
- (Romania) (Hungary) András Szász (LP) from (Romania) Dinamo București
- (Russia) Vitaly Komogorov (LB) from (Romania) Dinamo București
- (Hungary) Ádám Borbély (GK) from (Poland) Wisła Płock
- (Hungary) Bence Ernei (LW) from (Hungary) Telekom Veszprém
- (Hungary) Bence Bálint (LB) from (Hungary) NEKA
- (Hungary) Gábor Ancsin (RB) from (Hungary) Ferencvárosi TC
- (Bosnia and Herzegovina) Marko Davidović (CB) from (Hungary) Váci KSE
- (Serbia) Jožef Holpert (LW) from (Hungary) Váci KSE

Leaving

- (Hungary) Márton Székely (GK) to (Hungary) Telekom Veszprém
- (Croatia) Jakov Vranković (RB) to (Romania) Dinamo București
- (Romania) Demis Grigoraș (RB) to (France) Chambéry SMBH
- (Hungary) Miklós Rosta (LP) to (Hungary) MOL-Pick Szeged
- (Hungary) Bence Nagy (LB) to (Hungary) Ferencvárosi TC
- (Hungary) Zsolt Schäffer (RB) to (Hungary) Ferencvárosi TC
- (Hungary) Kevin Rozner (RW) to (Hungary) Váci KSE
- (Hungary) Tibor Mándy (RW) to (Hungary) SBS-Eger
- (Hungary) (Romania) Dániel Fekete (LB) to (Hungary) ETO-SZESE Győr
- (Hungary) Xevér Deményi (GK) on loan at (Hungary) Tatai AC

Transfers for the 2018–19 season

Joining

- (Hungary) László Bartucz (GK) from (Hungary) Csurgói KK
- (Serbia) (Hungary) Uros Borzas (CB) from (Hungary) Telekom Veszprém
- (Hungary) Mátyás Győri (CB) from (Hungary) Telekom Veszprém
- (Hungary) Bence Nagy (LB) from (Hungary) Budakalász FKC
- (Hungary) Zsolt Schäffer (RB) from (Hungary) NEKA

Leaving

- (Hungary) Gergely Harsányi (RW) to (Hungary) Tatai AC
- (Hungary) Szabolcs Szöllősi (LP) to (Hungary) Dabas KK
- (Romania) Ionuț Iancu (GK) to (Romania) HC Dobrogea Sud Constanța
- (Hungary) Balázs Szöllősi (CB) to (Hungary) Balatonfüredi KSE
- (Hungary) Zsolt Schäffer (RB) on loan at (Hungary) Ceglédi KKSE
- (Hungary) Xevér Deményi (GK) on loan at (Hungary) Tatai AC
- (Hungary) (Romania) Dániel Fekete (LB) on loan at (Hungary) Tatai AC
- (Hungary) Miklós Rosta (LP) on loan at (Hungary) ETO-SZESE Győr

Transfers for the 2017–18 season

Joining

- (Romania) Ionuț Iancu (GK) from (Romania) CSM București
- (Croatia) Jakov Vranković (RB) from (Romania) Dinamo București
- (Hungary) (Romania) Dániel Fekete (LB) from (Romania) Székelyudvarhelyi KC

Leaving

- (Hungary) Szabolcs Nagy (LB) to (Hungary) PLER KC
- (Hungary) Csaba Leimeter (RB) to (Hungary) Budakalász FKC
- (Hungary) (Slovakia) Mihály Tóth (GK) to (Hungary) Gyöngyösi KK

Transfers for the 2016–17 season

Joining

- (Hungary) Ferenc Ilyés (LB) from (Hungary) MOL-Pick Szeged
- (Bosnia and Herzegovina) Vladimir Vranješ (LP) from (Hungary) MOL-Pick Szeged
- (Hungary) Márton Székely (GK) from (Hungary) Csurgói KK
- (Montenegro) Miloš Božović (LB) from (Slovenia) Gorenje Velenje
- (Hungary) Szabolcs Nagy (LB) from (Hungary) PLER KC
- (Hungary) Csaba Leimeter (RB) from (Hungary) PLER KC
- (Romania) Demis Grigoraș (RB) from (Romania) SCM Politehnica Timișoara
- (Hungary) Balázs Szöllősi (CB) from (Hungary) Balatonfüredi KSE
- (Hungary) Adrián Sipos (LP) from (Romania) Székelyudvarhelyi KC
- (Hungary) (Slovakia) Mihály Tóth (GK) from (Hungary) Váci KSE

Leaving

- (Hungary) Richárd Bodó (LB) to (Hungary) MOL-Pick Szeged
- (Montenegro) Rade Mijatović (GK) to (Belarus) HC Meshkov Brest
- (Hungary) (Cuba) Ivo Díaz (CB) (retires)
- (Hungary) Dávid Katzirz (LB) to (Hungary) Balmazújvárosi KK
- (Hungary) Ákos Lele (LB) to (Hungary) Gyöngyösi KK
- (Slovakia) Martin Mazak (LP) to (Hungary) Budakalász FKC
- (Serbia) Nikola Crnoglavac (RB) to (Romania) HC Dobrogea Sud Constanța
- (Hungary) Péter Vaskó (RW) to (Hungary) Mezőkövesdi KC
- (Hungary) Ádám Borbély (GK) loan back to (Hungary) Telekom Veszprém
- (Hungary) Marcell Gábor (LB) to (Hungary) NEKA
- (Serbia) Marko Krsmančić (CB) to (Turkey) Besiktas
- (Hungary) Szabolcs Törő (LW) to (Germany) TuS Helmlingen

Transfers for the 2015–16 season

Joining

- (Hungary) Szabolcs Szöllősi (LP) from (Hungary) Csurgói KK
- (Hungary) Ákos Lele (LB) from (Hungary) Csurgói KK
- (Montenegro) Rade Mijatović (GK) from (Hungary) Csurgói KK
- (Montenegro) Miloš Vujović (LW) from (Hungary) Pécsi VSE
- (Hungary) Ádám Borbély (GK) on loan from (Hungary) MKB-MVM Veszprém
- (Serbia) Marko Krsmančić (CB) from (Austria) Alpla HC Hard
- (Serbia) Nikola Crnoglavac (RB) from (Serbia) RK Jugović
- (Hungary) Miklós Rosta (LP) from (Hungary) ETO-SZESE Győr

Leaving

- (Serbia) Novak Bošković (RB) to (Israel) Maccabi Tel Aviv
- (Hungary) Tamás Boros (GK) to (Hungary) PLER KC
- (Hungary) Szabolcs Nagy (LB) to (Hungary) PLER KC
- (Hungary) Donát Bartók (RB) to (Hungary) Váci KSE
- (Slovakia) Teodor Paul (GK) to (Hungary) Balmazújvárosi KK
- (Iran) Alireza Mousavi (LP) to (Romania) Dinamo București
- (Iran) Mohsen Babasafari (GK) to (Turkey) Göztepe S.K.

Transfers for the 2014–15 season

Joining

- (Serbia) Novak Bošković (RB) from (Israel) Maccabi Tel Aviv
- (Iran) Mohsen Babasafari (GK) from (Iran) Foolad Mobarakeh Sepahan
- (Iran) Alireza Mousavi (LP) from (Hungary) PLER KC
- (Bosnia and Herzegovina) Josip Perić (CB) from (Bosnia and Herzegovina) RK Bosna Sarajevo
- (Hungary) Marcell Gábor (LB) from (Hungary) MKB-MVM Veszprém
- (Hungary) Xavér Deményi (GK) from (Hungary) Budapesti Honvéd SE

Leaving

- (Hungary) (Serbia) Milorad Krivokapić (RB) to (Israel) Maccabi Rishon LeZion
- (Hungary) Gábor Szente (GK) to (Hungary) Pécsi VSE
- (Brazil) Alencar Cassiano Rossoni (LP) to (Hungary) PLER KC
- (Austria) Damir Djukic (CB) to (Austria) Union St. Pölten
- (Croatia) Mislav Nenadić (RB) to (Austria) HSG Bärnbach/Köflach
- (Hungary) Ádám Kanyó (LW) to (Hungary) Tatai AC
- (Hungary) Ádám Kiss (CB) to (Hungary) Tatai AC
- (Iran) Mohsen Babasafari (GK) on loan at (Hungary) PLER KC

Transfers for the 2013–14 season

Joining

- (Hungary) Ádám Kanyó (LW) from (Hungary) Orosházi FKSE
- (Slovakia) Teodor Paul (GK) from (Hungary) PLER KC
- (Slovakia) Martin Mazak (LP) from (Hungary) PLER KC
- (Hungary) Dávid Katzirz (LB) from (Hungary) Csurgói KK
- (Austria) Damir Djukic (CB) from (Austria) Union Leoben
- (Hungary) Donát Bartók (RB) from (Hungary) SC Pick Szeged
- (Croatia) Mislav Nenadić (RB) from (Croatia) Marina Kaštela
- (Hungary) (Serbia) Milorad Krivokapić (RB) from (Qatar) Al Rayyan

Leaving

- (Hungary) László Bartucz (GK) to (Hungary) Ceglédi KKSE
- (Hungary) Ádám Iváncsik (LW) to (Hungary) Gyöngyösi KK
- (Hungary) Ádám Salamon (CB) to (Hungary) Balmazújvárosi KK
- (Slovakia) Tomáš Urban (RW) to (Slovakia) Tatran Presov
- (Hungary) Ákos Lele (LB) to (Hungary) Csurgói KK
- (Hungary) Bálint Pordán (LP) to (Hungary) Csurgói KK
- (Hungary) Olivér Kiss (GK) to (Hungary) Mezőkövesdi KC
- (Hungary) Bence Putics (LB) to (Hungary) Várpalotai BSK

== Previous squads ==
2025–2026 Team
Shirt No	Nationality	Player	Birth Date	Position
7	Hungary	Roland Terjék	14 August 2004 (age 22)	Right Winger
8	Israel	Daniel Mosindi	10 January 2001 (age 25)	Right Back
11	France	Baptiste Damatrin	29 April 2000 (age 26)	Left Winger
12	Hungary	Márton Székely	2 January 1990 (age 36)	Goalkeeper
13	Croatia	Josip Šarac	24 February 1998 (age 28)	Left Back
17	Spain	Ignacio Plaza Jiménez	10 January 1994 (age 32)	Line Player
19	Hungary	Benedek Éles	6 September 1999 (age 27)	Left Back
21	Hungary	Arián Andó	29 January 1999 (age 27)	Goalkeeper
22	Hungary	Tamás Papp	11 November 2002 (age 24)	Line Player
24	Hungary	Dániel Sztraka	24 November 2003 (age 22)	Central Back
25	Hungary	Gábor Temesvári	29 March 2002 (age 24)	Right Back
26	HungarySpain	Pedro Rodríguez Álvarez	22 August 1990 (age 36)	Right Winger
28	North Macedonia	Filip Taleski	28 March 1996 (age 30)	Left Back
30	Romania	Demis Grigoraș	30 June 1993 (age 33)	Right Back
54	Czech Republic	Matěj Havran	22 January 2002 (age 24)	Left Back
78	Hungary	Huba Vajda	5 March 2000 (age 26)	Line Player
88	Hungary	Bence Krakovszki	9 July 2002 (age 24)	Left Winger
89	Russia	Dmitry Zhitnikov	20 November 1989 (age 36)	Central Back
96	Brazil	Patrick Lemos	23 May 1996 (age 30)	Central Back

2022–2023 Team
Shirt No	Nationality	Player	Birth Date	Position
1	Hungary	Benedek Nagy	17 November 2001 (age 25)	Goalkeeper
2	Croatia	Mateo Maraš	17 December 2000 (age 25)	Right Back
8	Hungary	Dávid Ubornyák	8 September 1998 (age 28)	Central Back
9	Bosnia and Herzegovina	Josip Perić	5 June 1992 (age 34)	Central Back
10	Serbia	Nemanja Obradović	8 January 1991 (age 35)	Left Back
11	HungaryCroatia	Petar Topic	30 December 1991 (age 34)	Line Player
12	Hungary	Márton Székely	2 January 1990 (age 36)	Goalkeeper
14	Hungary	Bence Hornyák	23 November 2000 (age 25)	Right Winger
15	Spain	Cristian Ugalde	19 October 1987 (age 39)	Left Winger
17	HungarySerbia	Andrej Pergel	18 June 2003 (age 23)	Left Back
19	Hungary	Kolen Krancz	11 September 2003 (age 23)	Line Player
22	Hungary	Mátyás Győri	2 February 1997 (age 29)	Central Back
23	HungarySerbia	Uroš Vilovski	25 February 1984 (age 42)	Line Player
24	Hungary	Márk Bodor	23 February 2000 (age 26)	Left Back
26	HungarySpain	Pedro Rodríguez Álvarez	22 August 1990 (age 36)	Right Winger
27	Hungary	Gábor Ancsin	27 November 1990 (age 35)	Right Back
33	HungaryUnited States	Olivér Edwards	8 September 2003 (age 23)	Left Winger
44	Hungary	Ádám Bodnár	27 June 2003 (age 23)	Central Back

2020–2021 Team
Shirt No	Nationality	Player	Birth Date	Position
1	Poland	Piotr Wyszomirski	6 January 1988 (age 38)	Goalkeeper
2	Montenegro	Miloš Božović	10 December 1994 (age 31)	Left Back
3	Hungary	Balázs Molnár	25 June 1997 (age 29)	Left Winger
4	Hungary	Nándor Bognár	29 September 2001 (age 25)	Line Player
6	Hungary	Barnabás Tóth	5 September 2003 (age 23)	Right Winger
7	Hungary	Ádám Juhász	6 June 1996 (age 30)	Central Back
8	Hungary	Adrián Sipos	8 March 1990 (age 36)	Line Player
13	Hungary	Richárd Nemes	11 December 1996 (age 29)	Line Player
14	Hungary	Bence Hornyák	23 November 2000 (age 25)	Right Winger
16	Hungary	László Bartucz	5 November 1991 (age 35)	Goalkeeper
17	SerbiaHungary	Stefan Sunajko	10 April 1998 (age 28)	Left Winger
18	Hungary	Ferenc Ilyés	20 December 1981 (age 44)	Left Back
19	Hungary	Zsolt Balogh	29 March 1989 (age 37)	Right Back
22	Hungary	Mátyás Győri	2 February 1997 (age 29)	Central Back
23	Hungary	Dávid Debreczeni	23 September 1992 (age 34)	Line Player
27	Hungary	Gábor Ancsin	27 November 1990 (age 35)	Right Back
29	Hungary	Bence Zdolik	16 May 1992 (age 34)	Left Back
44	Hungary	Ádám Bodnár	27 June 2003 (age 23)	Central Back
47	Hungary	Péter Hornyák	4 October 1995 (age 31)	Right Winger
96	Slovakia	Michal Martin Konečný	8 November 1996 (age 30)	Goalkeeper

2018–2019 Team
Shirt No	Nationality	Player	Birth Date	Position
1	Hungary	Xavér Deményi	16 April 1999 (age 27)	Goalkeeper
2	Montenegro	Miloš Božović	10 December 1994 (age 31)	Left Back
4	Hungary	Ákos Pásztor	24 June 1991 (age 35)	Right Winger
6	Montenegro	Miloš Vujović	5 September 1993 (age 33)	Left Winger
7	Hungary	Ádám Juhász	6 June 1996 (age 30)	Central Back
8	Hungary	Adrián Sipos	8 March 1990 (age 36)	Line Player
9	Hungary	Kevin Rozner	30 April 1998 (age 28)	Right Winger
11	Hungary	Bence Nagy	5 July 1995 (age 31)	Left Back
12	Hungary	Márton Székely	2 January 1990 (age 36)	Goalkeeper
13	Hungary	Uros Borzas	28 July 1999 (age 27)	Central Back
14	Hungary	Balázs Szöllősi	24 October 1992 (age 34)	Central Back
16	Hungary	László Bartucz	5 November 1991 (age 35)	Goalkeeper
18	Hungary	Ferenc Ilyés	20 December 1981 (age 44)	Left Back
19	Hungary	Miklós Rosta	14 February 1999 (age 27)	Line Player
22	Hungary	Mátyás Győri	2 February 1997 (age 29)	Central Back
23	Romania	Demis Grigoraș	30 June 1993 (age 33)	Right Back
24	Hungary	János Dénes	15 November 1984 (age 42)	Line Player
44	Hungary	Zsolt Schäffer	13 May 1999 (age 27)	Right Back
51	Hungary	Dániel Fekete	14 June 1999 (age 27)	Left Back
77	Bosnia and Herzegovina	Vladimir Vranješ	14 December 1988 (age 37)	Line Player
93	Croatia	Jakov Vranković	12 June 1993 (age 33)	Right Back

2016–2017 Team
Shirt No	Nationality	Player	Birth Date	Position
1	Hungary	Xavér Deményi	16 April 1999 (age 27)	Goalkeeper
2	Montenegro	Miloš Božović	10 December 1994 (age 31)	Left Back
3	Hungary	Kevin Rozner	30 April 1998 (age 28)	Right Winger
4	Hungary	Ákos Pásztor	24 June 1991 (age 35)	Right Winger
6	Montenegro	Miloš Vujović	5 September 1993 (age 33)	Left Winger
7	Hungary	Ádám Juhász	6 June 1996 (age 30)	Central Back
8	Hungary	Adrián Sipos	8 March 1990 (age 36)	Line Player
10	Hungary	Gergely Harsányi	3 May 1981 (age 45)	Right Winger
12	Hungary	Márton Székely	2 January 1990 (age 36)	Goalkeeper
14	Hungary	Balázs Szöllősi	24 October 1992 (age 34)	Central Back
15	Hungary	Csaba Leimeter	15 December 1994 (age 31)	Right Back
16	HungarySlovakia	Mihály Tóth	3 September 1992 (age 34)	Goalkeeper
18	Hungary	Ferenc Ilyés	20 December 1981 (age 44)	Left Back
19	Hungary	Miklós Rosta	14 February 1999 (age 27)	Line Player
23	Romania	Demis Grigoraș	30 June 1993 (age 33)	Right Back
24	Hungary	János Dénes	15 November 1984 (age 42)	Line Player
28	Hungary	Szabolcs Szöllősi	28 January 1989 (age 37)	Line Player
77	Bosnia and Herzegovina	Vladimir Vranješ	14 December 1988 (age 37)	Line Player
79	Hungary	Szabolcs Nagy	24 November 1995 (age 30)	Left Back

2015–2016 Team
Shirt No	Nationality	Player	Birth Date	Position
3	Hungary	Miklós Rosta	14 February 1999 (age 27)	Line Player
4	Hungary	Ákos Pásztor	24 June 1991 (age 35)	Right Winger
5	HungaryCuba	Ivo Díaz	10 May 1972 (age 54)	Central Back
6	Montenegro	Miloš Vujović	5 September 1993 (age 33)	Left Winger
7	Hungary	Ádám Juhász	6 June 1996 (age 30)	Central Back
8	Serbia	Marko Krsmančić	2 December 1989 (age 36)	Central Back
9	Hungary	Richárd Bodó	13 March 1993 (age 33)	Left Back
10	Hungary	Gergely Harsányi	3 May 1981 (age 45)	Right Winger
15	Serbia	Nikola Crnoglavac	22 April 1992 (age 34)	Right Back
16	Hungary	Ádám Borbély	22 June 1995 (age 31)	Goalkeeper
18	Hungary	Dávid Katzirz	25 June 1980 (age 46)	Left Back
19	Hungary	Szabolcs Törő	10 March 1983 (age 43)	Left Winger
21	Hungary	Ákos Lele	24 March 1988 (age 38)	Left Back
22	Slovakia	Martin Mazak	14 April 1984 (age 42)	Line Player
23	Hungary	Péter Vaskó	16 July 1995 (age 31)	Right Winger
24	Hungary	János Dénes	15 November 1984 (age 42)	Line Player
28	Hungary	Szabolcs Szöllősi	28 January 1989 (age 37)	Line Player
30	Montenegro	Rade Mijatović	30 June 1981 (age 45)	Goalkeeper
39	Hungary	Marcell Gábor	10 March 1998 (age 28)	Left Back

2014–2015 Team
Shirt No	Nationality	Player	Birth Date	Position
4	Hungary	Ákos Pásztor	24 June 1991 (age 35)	Right Winger
5	HungaryCuba	Ivo Díaz	10 May 1972 (age 54)	Central Back
6	Hungary	Péter Vaskó	16 July 1995 (age 31)	Right Winger
7	Hungary	Ádám Juhász	6 June 1996 (age 30)	Central Back
9	Hungary	Richárd Bodó	13 March 1993 (age 33)	Left Back
10	Hungary	Gergely Harsányi	3 May 1981 (age 45)	Right Winger
12	Hungary	Tamás Boros	20 May 1996 (age 30)	Goalkeeper
14	Hungary	Szabolcs Nagy	24 November 1995 (age 30)	Left Back
16	Iran	Mohsen Babasafari	28 June 1987 (age 39)	Goalkeeper
18	Hungary	Dávid Katzirz	25 June 1980 (age 46)	Left Back
19	Hungary	Szabolcs Törő	10 March 1983 (age 43)	Left Winger
22	Slovakia	Martin Mazak	14 April 1984 (age 42)	Line Player
23	Bosnia and Herzegovina	Josip Perić	5 June 1992 (age 34)	Central Back
24	Hungary	János Dénes	15 November 1984 (age 42)	Line Player
25	Serbia	Novak Bošković	23 May 1989 (age 37)	Right Back
28	Hungary	Ábel Nagy	28 April 1996 (age 30)	Left Winger
37	Hungary	Donát Bartók	13 July 1996 (age 30)	Right Back
39	Hungary	Marcell Gábor	10 March 1998 (age 28)	Left Back
55	Slovakia	Teodor Paul	22 April 1987 (age 39)	Goalkeeper
88	Iran	Alireza Mousavi	27 April 1990 (age 36)	Line Player

2010–2011 Team
Shirt No	Nationality	Player	Birth Date	Position
1	Hungary	Márton Melhardt	5 February 1991 (age 35)	Goalkeeper
5	HungaryCuba	Ivo Díaz	10 May 1972 (age 54)	Central Back
6	Hungary	Máté Halász	2 June 1984 (age 42)	Left Back
7	HungarySerbia	Marinko Kekezović	20 August 1985 (age 41)	Left Winger
8	Hungary	Ádám Kiss	16 October 1988 (age 38)	Central Back
9	Hungary	Tamás Nagy	16 December 1983 (age 42)	Central Back
10	Hungary	Gergely Harsányi	3 May 1981 (age 45)	Right Winger
13	Hungary	György Szabó	30 May 1977 (age 49)	Left Back
15	Hungary	Bence Kanyó	10 November 1990 (age 36)	Central Back
16	Hungary	Gábor Szente	1 September 1971 (age 55)	Goalkeeper
17	Hungary	Csaba Kocsis	1 October 1985 (age 41)	Line Player
18	Hungary	Ádám Kanyó	18 April 1985 (age 41)	Left Winger
20	Slovakia	Tomáš Urban	17 September 1989 (age 37)	Right Winger
21	Hungary	Ákos Lele	24 March 1988 (age 38)	Left Back
22	Hungary	Bálint Pordán	12 October 1988 (age 38)	Line Player
23	Hungary	Norbert Sutka	11 January 1985 (age 41)	Left Back
24	Hungary	János Dénes	15 November 1984 (age 42)	Line Player
35	Slovakia	Michal Melus	17 April 1974 (age 52)	Goalkeeper

2009–2010 Team
Shirt No	Nationality	Player	Birth Date	Position
3	Hungary	István Székely	3 May 1980 (age 46)	Right Winger
4	Hungary	Róbert Kányai	26 January 1981 (age 45)	Line Player
5	HungaryCuba	Ivo Díaz	10 May 1972 (age 54)	Central Back
6	Hungary	Máté Halász	2 June 1984 (age 42)	Left Back
7	Hungary	Gyula Gál	18 August 1976 (age 50)	Line Player
8	Hungary	Ádám Kiss	16 October 1988 (age 38)	Central Back
9	Hungary	Tamás Nagy	16 December 1983 (age 42)	Central Back
10	Hungary	Gergely Harsányi	3 May 1981 (age 45)	Right Winger
13	Hungary	György Szabó	30 May 1977 (age 49)	Left Back
14	Hungary	Roland Serfel	24 February 1978 (age 48)	Right Back
15	Hungary	Bence Kanyó	10 November 1990 (age 36)	Central Back
16	Hungary	Gábor Szente	1 September 1971 (age 55)	Goalkeeper
17	Hungary	Csaba Kocsis	1 October 1985 (age 41)	Line Player
18	Hungary	Ádám Kanyó	18 April 1985 (age 41)	Left Winger
20	Slovakia	Tomáš Urban	17 September 1989 (age 37)	Right Winger
23	Hungary	Norbert Sutka	11 January 1985 (age 41)	Left Back
24	Hungary	János Dénes	15 November 1984 (age 42)	Line Player
35	Slovakia	Michal Melus	17 April 1974 (age 52)	Goalkeeper

2003–2004 Team
Shirt No	Nationality	Player	Birth Date	Position
2	Hungary	Ádám Kanyó	18 April 1985 (age 41)	Left Winger
3	Hungary	Antal Krancz	26 January 1970 (age 56)	Line Player
4	Hungary	István Rosta	3 August 1972 (age 54)	Line Player
5	Hungary	Dávid Haag	29 July 1984 (age 42)	Central Back
6	Hungary	Norbert Kuzma	14 May 1972 (age 54)	Right Winger
7	Argentina	Bruno Civelli	30 April 1979 (age 47)	Left Back
9	Hungary	Zoltán Hímer	13 August 1974 (age 52)	Central Back
10	Hungary	István Szotyori	22 April 1969 (age 57)	Left Back
12	Hungary	Gábor Pulay	15 June 1970 (age 56)	Goalkeeper
14	Hungary	Miklós Lengyel	15 April 1979 (age 47)	Line Player
15	Hungary	Péter Lengyel	31 August 1980 (age 46)	Left Back
16	Hungary	János Szathmári	25 March 1969 (age 57)	Goalkeeper
17	Hungary	Balázs Szögi	22 December 1978 (age 47)	Central Back
22	Hungary	Roland Serfel	24 February 1978 (age 48)	Right Back
23	Hungary	István Kiss	12 February 1971 (age 55)	Central Back
26	Hungary	Mátyás Kovácsovics	15 March 1981 (age 45)	Goalkeeper
51	Hungary	Szabolcs Törő	10 March 1983 (age 43)	Left Winger
54	Hungary	Attila Németh	25 May 1982 (age 44)	Right Back
77	Hungary	Tamás Iváncsik	3 April 1983 (age 43)	Right Winger

== Top scorers ==
Season	Player	Apps/Goals
2004–2005	(Hungary) Szabolcs Törő	20/112
2005–2006	(Hungary) Árpád Mohácsi	30/186
2006–2007	(Hungary) Máté Halász	32/197
2007–2008	(Hungary) Máté Halász	28/154
2008–2009	(Hungary) Máté Halász	32/170
2009–2010	(Hungary) Máté Halász	29/181
2010–2011	(Hungary) Gergely Harsányi	31/156
2011–2012	(Hungary) Ákos Lele	25/134
2012–2013	(Hungary) Ákos Lele	25/160
2013–2014	(Hungary) Gergely Harsányi	29/152
2014–2015	(Hungary) Richárd Bodó	32/148
2015–2016	(Hungary) Richárd Bodó	34/166
2016–2017	(Montenegro) Miloš Vujović	26/143
2017–2018	(Montenegro) Miloš Vujović	26/142
2018–2019	(Montenegro) Miloš Vujović	26/180
2019–2020	Cancelled	
2020–2021	(Hungary) Mátyás Győri	24/88
2021–2022	(Hungary) Gábor Ancsin	26/141
2022–2023	(Hungary) (Spain) Pedro Rodríguez Álvarez	26/136
2023–2024	(Croatia) Mateo Maraš	25/90
2024–2025	(Croatia) Mateo Maraš	24/100
2025–2026	(Hungary) Benedek Éles	26/100

== Retired numbers ==
MOL-Tatabánya KC retired numbers
N°	Nationality	Player	Position	Tenure
5	(Hungary) (Cuba)	Ivo Díaz	Central Back	2009–2016
18	(Hungary)	Ferenc Ilyés	Left Back	2016–2021

== Honours ==
Honours	No.	Years
League
Nemzeti Bajnokság I Winners	4	1974, 1978, 1979, 1984
Nemzeti Bajnokság I Runners-up	3	1976, 1977, 1982
Nemzeti Bajnokság I Third place	10	1981, 2009–10, 2014–15, 2015–16, 2016–17, 2017–18, 2018–19, 2020–21, 2022–23, 2023–24
Nemzeti Bajnokság I/B Winners	4	1968, 1992–93, 1997–98, 2001–02
Nemzeti Bajnokság I/B Runners-up	1	1999–00
Nemzeti Bajnokság I/B Third place	1	2000–01
Domestic Cups
Magyar Kupa Winners	2	1969, 1978
Magyar Kupa Runners-up	6	1976, 1981, 1983 jan. 1984, 1988–89, 2025–26
Magyar Kupa Third place	8	1968, 1974, 1982, 2010–11, 2011–12, 2013–14, 2016–17, 2024–25
Best European Results
EHF Champions League Quarter-final	1	1979–80
EHF Cup Winners' Cup Semi-final	1	1979
EHF Cup Quarter-final	2	2016–17, 2018–19
IHF Cup Semi-final	1	1984
EHF European Cup Finalist	1	2025–26

=== Individual awards ===
- Double

Winners (1): 1977–78

==== Domestic ====
Nemzeti Bajnokság I Top Scorer

Season	Name	Goals
1967	(Hungary) Sándor Kaló	160
1969	(Hungary) Sándor Kaló	185
1980	(Hungary) Zsolt Kontra	
1984	(Hungary) László Marosi	
1985	(Hungary) László Marosi	
1986	(Hungary) László Marosi	
1987	(Hungary) László Marosi	268
1988–89	(Hungary) László Marosi	
1989–90	(Hungary) László Marosi	
2012–13	(Hungary) Ákos Lele	160
2018–19	(Montenegro) Miloš Vujović	180

== Seasons ==
=== Season to season ===
As of 15 June 2025

- Seasons in Nemzeti Bajnokság I: 53
- Seasons in Nemzeti Bajnokság I/B: 6
- Seasons in Nemzeti Bajnokság II: 7

Season	Tier	Division	Place	Magyar Kupa
1960	2	NB II Nyugat	9th	did not held
1961	2	NB II Nyugat	9th	did not held
1962	2	NB II Nyugat	3rd	did not held
1963	2	NB II Nyugat	3rd	
1964	2	NB II Nyugat	5th	

Season	Tier	Division	Place	Magyar Kupa
1965	2	NB II Nyugat	2nd	
1966	2	NB II Nyugat	1st	
1967	1	NB I	12th	
1968	2*	NB I/B	1st	Third place
1969	1	NB I	4th	Winners

Season	Tier	Division	Place	Magyar Kupa
1970	1	NB I	4th	
1971	1	NB I	7th	
1972	1	NB I	5th	
1973	1	NB I	7th	
1974	1	NB I	Champions	Third place
1975	1	NB I	4th	did not held
1976	1	NB I	Runners-up	Finalist
1977	1	NB I	Runners-up	
1978	1	NB I	Champions	Winners
1979	1	NB I	Champions	
1980	1	NB I	4th	
1981	1	NB I	Third place	Finalist
1982	1	NB I	Runners-up	Third place
1983	1	NB I	5th	Finalist*
1983	1	NB I	5th	*
1984	1	NB I	Champions	Finalist
1985	1	NB I	4th	Fourth place
1986	1	NB I	8th	
1987	1	NB I	4th	
only Magyar Kupa was held in 1988				
1988–89	1	NB I	5th	Finalist

Season	Tier	Division	Place	Magyar Kupa
1989–90	1	NB I	7th	
1990–91	1	NB I	4th	
1991–92	1	NB I	15th	
1992–93	2	NB I/B Nyugat	1st	
1993–94	1	NB I	8th	
1994–95	1	NB I	12th	
1995–96	1	NB I	11th	
1996–97	1	NB I	13th	
1997–98	2	NB I/B Nyugat	1st	
1998–99	1	NB I	14th	
1999–00	2	NB I/B Nyugat	2nd	
2000–01	2	NB I/B Nyugat	3rd	
2001–02	2	NB I/B Nyugat	1st	
2002–03	1	NB I	5th	
2003–04	1	NB I	4th	Fourth place
2004–05	1	NB I	4th	
2005–06	1	NB I	5th	
2006–07	1	NB I	8th	Fourth place
2007–08	1	NB I	9th	
2008–09	1	NB I	6th	
2009–10	1	NB I	Third place	

Season	Tier	Division	Place	Magyar Kupa
2010–11	1	NB I	4th	Third place
2011–12	1	NB I	5th	Third place
2012–13	1	NB I	4th	Quarter-finals
2013–14	1	NB I	5th	Third place
2014–15	1	NB I	Third place	Round 4
2015–16	1	NB I	Third place	Round 3
2016–17	1	NB I	Third place	Third place
2017–18	1	NB I	Third place	Round 5
2018–19	1	NB I	Third place	Round 5
2019–20	1	NB I	Cancelled due COVID-19	
2020–21	1	NB I	Third place	Round 5
2021–22	1	NB I	5th	Round 5
2022–23	1	NB I	Third place	Fourth place
2023–24	1	NB I	Third place	Round 5
2024–25	1	NB I	4th	Third place
2025–26	1	NB I	Third place	Finalist

=== European competition ===
As of 04/04/2026:

Competition	Seasons	Year(s) in the competition
EHF Champions League (Champions Cup)	3x	1979/80, 1980/81, 1985/86
EHF European League (EHF Cup) (IHF Cup)	20x	1981/82, 1982/83, 1983/84, 1989/90, 2004/05, 2005/06, 2010/11, 2011/12, 2012/13, 2013/14, 2014/15, 2015/16, 2016/17, 2017/18, 2018/19, 2019/20, 2020/21, 2021/22, 2023/24, 2024/25
EHF European Cup (City Cup), (Challenge Cup)	1x	2025/26
EHF Cup Winners' Cup (defunct)	1x	1978/79
Source: kézitörténelem.hu	25 seasons	

Statistics: matches played: 134 – wins: 63 – draws: 12 – losses: 59 – goals scored: 3,665 – goals conceded: 3,640

EHF Cup Winners' Cup: from the 2012–13 season, the men's competition was merged with the EHF Cup.
EHF Cup: It was formerly known as the IHF Cup until 1993. Also, starting from the 2012–13 season the competition has been merged with the EHF Cup Winners' Cup. The competition will be known as the EHF European League from the 2020–21 season.

Competition	Round	Club	Home	Away	Aggregate
1978–79 EHF Cup Winners' Cup	Round of 16	(France) Saint Martin d'Heres	33–17	22–22	55–39
1978–79 EHF Cup Winners' Cup	Quarter-finals	(Iceland) Víkingur Reykjavík	wo.		
1978–79 EHF Cup Winners' Cup	Semi-finals	(West Germany) VfL Gummersbach	21–21	10–18	31–39
1979–80 European Cup	Second round	(West Germany) TuS Hofweier	19–14	16–19	35–33
1979–80 European Cup	Quarter-finals	(Czechoslovakia) Dukla Prague	19–18	21–23	40–41
1980–81 European Cup	First round	(Turkey) Beşiktaş J.K.	49–16	41–28	90–44
1980–81 European Cup	Second round	(Iceland) Víkingur Reykjavík	23–22	20–21	43–43 (a)
1981–82 IHF Cup	Round of 16	(East Germany) SC Leipzig	30–23	20–27	50–50 (a)
1982–83 IHF Cup	Round of 16	(Switzerland) RTV 1879 Basel	32–30	27–22	59–52
1982–83 IHF Cup	Quarter-finals	(Soviet Union) IL Zaporizhia	26–26	18–29	44–55
1983–84 IHF Cup	Round of 16	(Sweden) Ystads IF	32–18	21–28	53–46
1983–84 IHF Cup	Quarter-finals	(Iceland) FH	35–27	20–19	55–46
1983–84 IHF Cup	Semi-finals	(West Germany) TV Großwallstadt	23–22	20–22	43–44
1985–86 European Cup	First round	(Greece) A.C. Ionikos	36–11	41–20	77–31
1985–86 European Cup	Second round	(Czechoslovakia) Dukla Prague	24–24	23–29	47–53
1989–90 IHF Cup	First round	(Czechoslovakia) Dukla Prague	22–20	25–38	47–58
2004–05 EHF Cup	Second round	(Luxembourg) HB Esch	38–20	34–30	72–50
2004–05 EHF Cup	Third round	(France) US Dunkerque HB	31–27	23–36	54–63
2005–06 EHF Cup	Second round	(Belarus) SKA Minsk	33–22	36–30	69–52
2005–06 EHF Cup	Third round	(Switzerland) Wacker Thun	30–27	31–37	61–64
2010–11 EHF Cup	Third round	(Bosnia and Herzegovina) RK Borac m:tel Banja Luka	29–21	25–23	54–44
2010–11 EHF Cup	Round of 16	(Spain) Naturhouse La Rioja	30–25	26–39	56–64
2011–12 EHF Cup	Second round	(Greece) A.C. PAOK	29–25	27–23	56–48
2011–12 EHF Cup	Third round	(Germany) Frisch Auf Göppingen	26–28	25–34	51–62
2012–13 EHF Cup	Second round	(Norway) Elverum Håndball	23–27	23–32	46–59
2013–14 EHF Cup	First qualifying round	(Belgium) Achilles Bocholt	30–22	35–30	65–52
2013–14 EHF Cup	Second qualifying round	(Sweden) Lugi HF	20–24	27–27	47–51
2014–15 EHF Cup	Second qualifying round	(Luxembourg) Handball Esch	25–25	25–24	50–49
2014–15 EHF Cup	Third qualifying round	(Russia) St. Petersburg HC	23–22	24–32	47–53
2015–16 EHF Cup	Third qualifying round	(Sweden) Ystads IF	20–31	28–28	48–59
2016–17 EHF Cup	Third qualifying round	(Israel) Maccabi Srugo Rishon LeZion	35–23	28–26	63–49
2016–17 EHF Cup	Group stage (Group C)	(Denmark) KIF Kolding København	28–26	29–26	2nd
2016–17 EHF Cup	Group stage (Group C)	(Germany) SC Magdeburg	28–31	25–30	2nd
2016–17 EHF Cup	Group stage (Group C)	(Israel) Maccabi Castro Tel Aviv	27–24	24–20	2nd
2016–17 EHF Cup	Quarter-finals	(Germany) Füchse Berlin	25–30	22–28	47–58
2017–18 EHF Cup	Third qualifying round	(France) Chambéry Savoie Mont-Blanc HB	25–24	21–23	46–47
2018–19 EHF Cup	Third qualifying round	(Netherlands) OCI-Lions	31–18	27–27	58–45
2018–19 EHF Cup	Group stage (Group B)	(Germany) TSV Hannover-Burgdorf	28–25	27–27	1st
2018–19 EHF Cup	Group stage (Group B)	(North Macedonia) Eurofarm Rabotnik	30–27	31–21	1st
2018–19 EHF Cup	Group stage (Group B)	(Croatia) Nexe Našice	27–28	29–26	1st
2018–19 EHF Cup	Quarter-finals	(Denmark) TTH Holstebro	26–23	24–29	50–52
2019–20 EHF Cup	Third qualifying round	(Ukraine) ZTR Zaporizhia	27–24	26–27	53–51
2019–20 EHF Cup	Group stage (Group D)	(France) PAUC Handball	24–24	22–26	Cancelled
2019–20 EHF Cup	Group stage (Group D)	(Germany) Füchse Berlin	x	27–27	Cancelled
2019–20 EHF Cup	Group stage (Group D)	(Spain) BM Logroño La Rioja	26–25	x	Cancelled
2020–21 EHF European League
2020–21 EHF European League	Group stage (Group D)	(Switzerland) Kadetten Schaffhausen	30–32	23–27	6th
2020–21 EHF European League	Group stage (Group D)	(North Macedonia) RK Eurofarm Pelister	21–24	19–21	6th
2020–21 EHF European League	Group stage (Group D)	(Germany) Rhein-Neckar Löwen	26–32	30–37	6th
2020–21 EHF European League	Group stage (Group D)	(Denmark) GOG Håndbold	32–35	28–30	6th
2020–21 EHF European League	Group stage (Group D)	(Slovenia) RK Trimo Trebnje	26–28	28–32	6th
2021–22 EHF European League
2021–22 EHF European League	Group stage (Group D)	(Switzerland) Kadetten Schaffhausen	31–23	26–32	6th
2021–22 EHF European League	Group stage (Group D)	(North Macedonia) RK Eurofarm Pelister	25–21	20–33	6th
2021–22 EHF European League	Group stage (Group D)	(Greece) AEK Athens	25–24	26–34	6th
2021–22 EHF European League	Group stage (Group D)	(Portugal) Sporting CP	23–37	26–34	6th
2021–22 EHF European League	Group stage (Group D)	(France) USAM Nîmes Gard	30–38	22–24	6th
2023–24 EHF European League
2023–24 EHF European League	Group stage (Group H)	(Portugal) Sporting CP	31–29	28–36	3rd
2023–24 EHF European League	Group stage (Group H)	(Poland) Chrobry Głogów	37–24	30–25	3rd
2023–24 EHF European League	Group stage (Group H)	(Romania) CSM Constanta	24–29	25–28	3rd
2024–25 EHF European League
2024–25 EHF European League	Group stage (Group H)	(Germany) SG Flensburg-Handewitt	29–39	27–44	2nd
2024–25 EHF European League	Group stage (Group H)	(Croatia) MRK Sesvete	28–25	31–27	2nd
2024–25 EHF European League	Group stage (Group H)	(Czech Republic) HCB Karviná	28–27	31–31	2nd
2024–25 EHF European League	Main round (Group IV)	(Germany) VfL Gummersbach	29–44	27–33	4th
2024–25 EHF European League	Main round (Group IV)	(France) Fenix Toulouse Handball	31–33	28–35	4th
2025–26 EHF European Cup; Finalist	Round 2	(Norway) Nærbø Håndball	33–27	30–32	63–59
2025–26 EHF European Cup; Finalist	Round 3	(Switzerland) HSC Suhr Aarau	40–33	27–25	67–58
2025–26 EHF European Cup; Finalist	Last 16	(Norway) Runar Sandefjord	35–33	36–31	71–64
2025–26 EHF European Cup; Finalist	Quarter-finals	(Turkey) Nilüfer Belediyespor	31–31	37–35	68–66
2025–26 EHF European Cup; Finalist	Semi-finals	(Bosnia and Herzegovina) RK Izviđač	37–34	31–33	68–67
2025–26 EHF European Cup; Finalist	Final	(North Macedonia) GRK Ohrid	28–29	25–31	53–60

Season	Competition	Round	Club	Home	Away	Aggregate
2026–27	EHF European League	Group stage (Group H)	(Iceland) Valur	29–28	34–38	
2026–27	EHF European League	Group stage (Group H)	(Slovenia) RD Slovan	31–36		
2026–27	EHF European League	Group stage (Group H)	(Denmark) Mors-Thy Håndbold		33–35	

==== European record ====
===== EHF European Cup =====
Season	Round	Club	Home	Away	Aggregate
2025–26; Finalist	Round 2	(Norway) Nærbø Håndball	33–27	30–32	63–59
2025–26; Finalist	Round 3	(Switzerland) HSC Suhr Aarau	40–33	27–25	67–58
2025–26; Finalist	Last 16	(Norway) Runar Sandefjord	35–33	36–31	71–64
2025–26; Finalist	Quarter-finals	(Turkey) Nilüfer Belediyespor	31–31	37–35	68–66
2025–26; Finalist	Semi-finals	(Bosnia and Herzegovina) RK Izviđač	37–34	31–33	68–67
2025–26; Finalist	Final	(North Macedonia) GRK Ohrid	28–29	25–31	53–60

==== Overall results by opponent and country ====
As of 06/06/2026

Country	Club	P	W	D	L	GF	GA	GD
Belarus	SKA Minsk	2	2	0	0	69	52	17
Subtotal		2	2	0	0	69	52	17
Belgium	Achilles Bocholt	2	2	0	0	65	52	13
Subtotal		2	2	0	0	65	52	13
Bosnia and Herzegovina	RK Borac Banja Luka	2	2	0	0	54	44	10
Bosnia and Herzegovina	RK Izviđač	2	1	0	1	68	67	1
Subtotal		4	3	0	1	122	111	11
Croatia	Nexe Našice	2	1	0	1	56	54	2
Croatia	MRK Sesvete	2	2	0	0	59	52	7
Subtotal		4	3	0	1	115	106	9
Czech Republic	Dukla Prague	6	2	1	3	134	152	−18
Czech Republic	HCB Karviná	2	1	1	0	59	58	1
Subtotal		8	3	2	3	193	210	-17
Denmark	GOG Håndbold	2	0	0	2	60	65	−5
Denmark	KIF Kolding København	2	2	0	0	57	52	5
Denmark	TTH Holstebro	2	1	0	1	50	52	−2
Subtotal		6	3	0	3	167	169	-2
France	Chambéry Savoie Mont-Blanc HB	2	1	0	1	46	47	−1
France	US Dunkerque HB	2	1	0	1	54	63	−9
France	Fenix Toulouse Handball	2	0	0	2	59	68	−9
France	PAUC Handball	2	0	1	1	46	50	−4
France	Saint Martin d'Heres	2	2	0	0	55	39	16
France	USAM Nîmes Gard	2	0	0	2	52	62	−10
Subtotal		12	4	1	7	312	329	-17
Germany	Füchse Berlin	3	0	1	2	74	85	−11
Germany	SG Flensburg-Handewitt	2	0	0	2	56	83	−27
Germany	Frisch Auf Göppingen	2	0	0	2	51	62	−11
Germany	Rhein-Neckar Löwen	2	0	0	2	56	69	−13
Germany	SC DHfK Leipzig	2	1	0	1	50	50	0
Germany	SC Magdeburg	2	0	0	2	53	61	−8
Germany	TSV Hannover-Burgdorf	2	1	1	0	55	52	3
Germany	TuS Hofweier	2	1	0	1	35	33	2
Germany	TV Großwallstadt	2	1	0	1	43	44	−1
Germany	VfL Gummersbach	4	0	1	3	87	116	−29
Subtotal		23	4	3	16	591	694	-103
Greece	A.C. Ionikos	2	2	0	0	77	31	46
Greece	A.C. PAOK	2	2	0	0	56	48	8
Greece	AEK Athens	2	1	0	1	51	58	−7
Subtotal		6	5	0	1	184	137	47
Iceland	FH	2	2	0	0	55	46	9
Iceland	Víkingur Reykjavík	2	1	0	1	43	43	0
Subtotal		4	3	0	1	98	89	9
Israel	Maccabi Castro Tel Aviv	2	2	0	0	51	44	7
Israel	Maccabi Srugo Rishon LeZion	2	2	0	0	63	49	14
Subtotal		4	4	0	0	114	93	21
Luxembourg	Handball Esch	4	3	1	0	122	99	23
Subtotal		4	3	1	0	122	99	23
Netherlands	OCI-Lions	2	1	1	0	58	45	13
Subtotal		2	1	1	0	58	45	13
North Macedonia	GRK Ohrid	2	0	0	2	53	60	−7
North Macedonia	Eurofarm Rabotnik	6	3	0	3	146	147	−1
Subtotal		8	3	0	5	199	207	-8
Norway	Elverum Håndball	2	0	0	2	46	59	−13
Norway	Nærbø Håndball	2	1	0	1	63	59	4
Norway	Runar Sandefjord	2	2	0	0	71	64	7
Subtotal		6	3	0	3	180	182	-2
Poland	Chrobry Głogów	2	2	0	0	67	49	18
Subtotal		2	2	0	0	67	49	18
Portugal	Sporting CP	4	1	0	3	108	136	−28
Subtotal		4	1	0	3	108	136	-28
Romania	CSM Constanta	2	0	0	2	49	57	−8
Subtotal		2	0	0	2	49	57	-8
Russia	St. Petersburg HC	2	1	0	1	47	53	−6
Subtotal		2	1	0	1	47	53	-6
Slovenia	RK Trimo Trebnje	2	0	0	2	54	60	−6
Subtotal		2	0	0	2	54	60	-6
Spain	BM Logroño La Rioja	3	2	0	1	82	89	−7
Subtotal		3	2	0	1	82	89	-7
Sweden	Lugi HF	2	0	1	1	47	51	−4
Sweden	Ystads IF	4	1	1	2	101	105	−4
Subtotal		6	1	2	3	148	156	-8
Switzerland	HSC Suhr Aarau	2	2	0	0	67	58	9
Switzerland	Kadetten Schaffhausen	4	1	0	3	110	114	−4
Switzerland	RTV 1879 Basel	2	2	0	0	59	52	7
Switzerland	Wacker Thun	2	1	0	1	61	64	−3
Subtotal		10	6	0	4	297	288	9
Turkey	Beşiktaş J.K.	2	2	0	0	90	44	46
Turkey	Nilüfer Belediyespor	2	1	1	0	68	66	2
Subtotal		4	3	1	0	158	110	48
Ukraine	ZTR Zaporizhia	4	1	1	2	97	106	−9
Subtotal		4	1	1	2	97	106	-9
		P	W	D	L	GF	GA	GD
Total		134	63	12	59	3665	3640	25

==== EHF ranking ====
Last updated on 27/06/2026

Rank	Team	Points
25	(Norway) Elverum Håndball	184
26	(North Macedonia) RK Vardar	182
27	(Switzerland) Kadetten Schaffhausen	179
28	(Hungary) MOL Tatabánya KC	174
29	(Bosnia and Herzegovina) RK Izviđač	171
30	(Greece) Olympiacos	170
31	(North Macedonia) RK Eurofarm Pelister	160

== Records ==
=== Most appearances in international cups ===
Last updated on 27/06/2026

Rank	Name	Apps	Goals
1	(Hungary) Ádám Juhász	55	161
2	(Hungary) László Bartucz	49	1
3	(Hungary) Márton Székely	47	3
4	(Hungary) János Dénes	42	13
5	(Hungary) Adrián Sipos	38	37
5	(Hungary) Ferenc Ilyés	38	29
6	(Hungary) Ákos Pásztor	35	66
7	(Romania) Demis Grigoraș	30	121
7	(Montenegro) Miloš Božović	30	87
8	(Hungary) Gábor Ancsin	28	110
9	(Hungary) Zsolt Kontra	27	173
10	(Montenegro) Miloš Vujović	26	149
10	(Hungary) Mátyás Győri	26	103

=== Most goals in international cups ===
Last updated on 27/06/2026

Rank	Name	Apps	Goals
1	(Hungary) Zsolt Kontra	27	173
2	(Hungary) Ádám Juhász	55	161
3	(Montenegro) Miloš Vujović	26	149
4	(Romania) Demis Grigoraș	30	121
5	(Hungary) Gábor Ancsin	28	110
6	(Hungary) Ernő Gubányi	24	105
7	(Hungary) László Marosi	16	103
7	(Hungary) Mátyás Győri	26	103
8	(Montenegro) Miloš Božović	30	87
9	(Hungary) Gergely Harsányi	22	79
10	(Hungary) Ákos Pásztor	35	66

== Former club members ==
=== Notable former players ===
Criteria

To appear in this section a player must have either:

- Played at least one official international match for their national team at any time.
- Or spent at least 10 years with the team.

==== Goalkeepers ====
- (Hungary) Arián Andó (2025–)
- (Hungary) Béla Bartalos (1978–1980)
- (Hungary) László Bartucz (2011–2013, 2018–2022, 2023–2025)
- (Hungary) Imre Bíró (1985–1989)
- (Hungary) Ádám Borbély (2015–2016, 2019–2020)
- (Hungary) Zoltán Gerháth
- (Hungary) László Hoffmann
- (Hungary) Szilveszter Liszkai (2007–2008)
- (Hungary) Benedek Nagy (2022–2023)
- (Hungary) Péter Nagy
- (Hungary) László Szabó (1968–1980)
- (Hungary) János Szathmári (2003–2005)
- (Hungary) Gábor Szente
- (Hungary) Márton Székely (2016–2019, 2022–)
- (Hungary) (Slovakia) Mihály Tóth (2016–2017)
- (Iran) Mohsen Babasafari
- (Montenegro) Rade Mijatović (2015–2016)
- (Poland) Piotr Wyszomirski (2020–2022)
- (Romania) Ionuț Iancu (2017–2018)
- (Slovakia) Michal Martin Konečný (2020–2021)
- (Slovakia) Michal Meluš
- (Slovakia) Teodor Paul (2013–2015)

==== Right wingers ====
- (Hungary) Attila Borsos (1986–1988, 1990–1991, 2002–2003)
- (Hungary) Ernő Gubányi
- (Hungary) Gergely Harsányi (2010–2018)
- (Hungary) Péter Hornyák (2019–2022)
- (Hungary) Mihály Iváncsik (1999–2000)
- (Hungary) Tamás Iváncsik (2003–2006)
- (Hungary) Árpád Pál (1976–1984, 1987)
- (Hungary) Ákos Pásztor (2011–2020)
- (Hungary) (Spain) Pedro Rodríguez Álvarez (2022–)
- (Hungary) István Székely (2009–2010)
- (Hungary) (Austria) Norbert Visy
- (Japan) Yuga Enomoto (2023–2025)
- (Slovakia) Tomáš Urban (2009–2011, 2012)

==== Left wingers ====
- (Hungary) György Bakos
- (Hungary) (United States) Olivér Edwards
- (Hungary) Dávid Fekete (2022)
- (Hungary) (Serbia) Marinko Kekezović (2010–2011)
- (Hungary) Zsolt Kontra (1976–1986)
- (Hungary) Bence Krakovszki (2023–2026)
- (Hungary) Robin Molnár (2026–)
- (Hungary) (Serbia) Stefan Sunajko (2020–2022)
- (Hungary) Szabolcs Törő
- (Montenegro) Miloš Vujović (2015–2020)
- (Spain) Cristian Ugalde (2022–2024)
- (Serbia) Jožef Holpert (2020)

==== Line players ====
- (Hungary) János Dénes (2009–2020)
- (Hungary) Ákos Doros (2005–2006)
- (Hungary) Gyula Gál (2009, 2012)
- (Hungary) Antal Kanyó (1974–1990)
- (Hungary) Miklós Karai (2026–)
- (Hungary) Tamás Papp (2025–)
- (Hungary) István Rosta
- (Hungary) Miklós Rosta (2015–2019)
- (Hungary) Ákos Sándor
- (Hungary) Jakab Sibalin
- (Hungary) Adrián Sipos (2016–2021)
- (Hungary) (Romania) András Szász (2019–2020)
- (Hungary) Szabolcs Szöllősi (2015–2018)
- (Hungary) Bence Szűcs (2026–)
- (Hungary) (Croatia) Petar Topic (2022–2025)
- (Hungary) Huba Vajda (2023–2024, 2025–)
- (Hungary) (Serbia) Uroš Vilovski (2022–2024)
- (Hungary) György Zsigmond
- (Bosnia and Herzegovina) Vladimir Vranješ (2016–2020)
- (Belarus) Aliaksei Ushal (2021–2022)
- (Brazil) Alencar Cassiano Rossoni
- (Iran) Alireza Mousavi (2014–2015)
- (Slovakia) Martin Mazak

==== Left backs ====
- (Hungary) Richárd Bodó (2011–2016, 2026–)
- (Hungary) Péter Fülöp
- (Hungary) Ferenc Füzesi (1982–1985)
- (Hungary) Mátyás Győri (2018–2024)
- (Hungary) Máté Halász (2005–2011)
- (Hungary) Ferenc Ilyés (2016–2021)
- (Hungary) (Iran) Iman Jamali (2023)
- (Hungary) Dávid Katzirz (2004–2005, 2013–2016)
- (Hungary) István Kiss
- (Hungary) Rudolf Kubasi (1997–1999)
- (Hungary) Ákos Lele (2010–2013, 2015–2016)
- (Hungary) László Marosi (1981–1990)
- (Hungary) Árpád Mohácsi (2005–2006)
- (Hungary) Bence Nagy (2019)
- (Hungary) (Serbia) Andrej Pergel (2023–2024)
- (Hungary) Norbert Sutka
- (Hungary) István Szotyori
- (Hungary) Bence Szöllősi
- (Hungary) Bence Zdolik (2020–2022)
- (Argentina) Bruno Civelli (2004)
- (Croatia) Josip Šarac (2025–)
- (Czech Republic) Matěj Havran (2024–2026)
- (Germany) Christian Dissinger (2024–2025)
- (Iran) Reza Yadegari (2023–2024)
- (North Macedonia) Filip Lazarov
- (North Macedonia) Filip Taleski (2026)
- (Montenegro) Miloš Božović (2016–2021)
- (Poland) Damian Przytuła (2024–2025)
- (Romania) Viorel Fotache (2021–2022)
- (Russia) Vitaly Komogorov (2019–2020)
- (Serbia) (Hungary) Uros Borzas (2019–2020)
- (Serbia) Nemanja Obradović (2022–2023)
- (Slovakia) Lukáš Urban (2021–2022)

==== Central backs ====
- (Hungary) Viktor Debre (1985–1990)
- (Hungary) (Cuba) Ivo Díaz (2009–2016)
- (Hungary) Ádám Juhász (2012–2022, 2023–2024)
- (Hungary) Lajos Simó (1967–1978)
- (Hungary) Balázs Szöllősi
- (Hungary) Dávid Ubornyák (2022–2023)
- (Austria) Damir Djukic (2013–2014)
- (Bosnia and Herzegovina) Marko Davidović (2020)
- (Bosnia and Herzegovina) Josip Perić (2014–2015, 2022–2024)
- (Russia) Dmitry Zhitnikov (2025–)
- (Serbia) Marko Krsmančić (2015–2016)

==== Right backs ====
- (Hungary) Gábor Ancsin (2019–2024)
- (Hungary) Zsolt Balogh (2019–2022)
- (Hungary) Donát Bartók (2013–2015)
- (Hungary) Sándor Kaló
- (Hungary) (Serbia) Milorad Krivokapić (2013–2014)
- (Hungary) Csaba Leimeter (2016–2017)
- (Hungary) István Rédei (2011–2012)
- (Croatia) Igor Kos
- (Croatia) Mateo Maraš (2022–2025)
- (Croatia) Jakov Vranković (2017–2019)
- (Israel) Daniel Mosindi (2025–)
- (Montenegro) (Qatar) Žarko Marković
- (Romania) Demis Grigoraș (2016–2019, 2025–)
- (Serbia) Nikola Crnoglavac (2015–2016)
- (Serbia) Novak Bošković (2014–2015)
- (Serbia) Milan Golubović (2024–2025)

=== Former coaches ===
Seasons	Coach	Country
1967–1973	János Faragó	(Hungary)
1973–1980	Miklós Albrecht	(Hungary)
1980–1981	Sándor Kaló	(Hungary)
1981–1982	Lajos Simó	(Hungary)
1982–1984	Ferenc Kuzma	(Hungary)
1984–1987	Ákos Ajtony	(Hungary)
1987–1990	László Szabó	(Hungary)
1990–1991	Sándor Németh	(Hungary)
1991–1995	Lajos Simó	(Hungary)
1994–1995	Ottó Szigeti	(Hungary)
1995–1996	Ferenc Kuzma	(Hungary)
1996–1997	Péter Basky	(Hungary)
1996–1998	Sándor Kaló	(Hungary)
1998–2004	Antal Kanyó	(Hungary)
2004–2008	Ferenc Füzesi	(Hungary)
2008–2014	Viktor Debre	(Hungary)
2014–2021	Vladan Matić	(Serbia) (Hungary)
2021	Jakab Sibalin	(Hungary)
2021–2022	Dragan Đukić	(Serbia)
2022–2023	Csaba Tombor	(Hungary)
2023	Jakab Sibalin	(Hungary)
2024	Dragan Đukić	(Serbia)
2024–2025	Cristian Ugalde	(Spain)
2025–	Edmond Tóth	(Hungary)
