= 2009–10 Nemzeti Bajnokság I (men's handball) =

Season of Hungarian handball league

Nemzeti Bajnokság I
- Season: 2009–10
- Country: Hungary
- Champions: MKB Veszprém
- Champions League: MKB Veszprém; Pick Szeged
- EHF Cup: Tatabánya KC; Dunaferr SE
- Cup Winners' Cup: Balatonfüredi KSE

In the 2009–10 season, the Hungarian men's handball league known as Nemzeti Bajnokság I contained 13 teams. The MKB Veszprém team finished as champions, and two teams were relegated.

== Team information ==
Location of teams in the 2009–10 Nemzeti Bajnokság I

Team	Location	Arena	Capacity
Balatonfüredi KSE	Balatonfüred	Balaton Szabadidő és Konferencia Központ	712
Csurgói KK	Csurgó	Városi Sportcsarnok	800
Debreceni KSE	Debrecen	Hódos Imre Sportcsarnok	2,000
Dunaferr SE	Dunaújváros	Dunaferr Sportcsarnok	1,200
Ferencvárosi TC	Budapest	Főtáv FTC Kézilabda Aréna	1,300
Gyöngyösi KK	Gyöngyös	Városi Sportcsarnok	1,600
Kecskemét SE	Kecskemét	Messzi István Sportcsarnok	1,200
Mezőkövesdi KC	Mezőkövesd	Városi Sportcsarnok	800
PLER KC	Budapest	Pestszentimrei Sportkastély	1,000
Pick Szeged	Szeged	Városi Sportcsarnok	3,200
Tatabánya KC	Tatabánya	Földi Imre Sportcsarnok	1,000
Tatran Prešov	(Slovakia) Prešov	City Hall	4,000
MKB Veszprém	Veszprém	Veszprém Aréna	5,096

== Regular season ==
=== Standings ===
	Team	Pld	W	D	L	GF	GA	Diff	Pts
1	MKB Veszprém	24	24	0	0	865	574	+291	48
2	Pick Szeged	24	20	1	3	815	696	+119	41
3	(Slovakia) Tatran Prešov	24	18	1	5	813	696	+117	37
4	Tatabánya KC	24	15	0	9	695	664	+31	30
5	Dunaferr SE	24	13	1	10	651	673	−22	27
6	PLER KC	24	11	1	12	654	660	−6	23
7	Csurgói KK	24	10	1	13	686	717	−31	21
8	Kecskemét SE	24	7	4	13	639	674	−35	18
9	Balatonfüredi KSE	24	8	2	14	606	663	−57	18
10	Ferencvárosi TC	24	6	2	16	618	671	−53	14
11	Mezőkövesdi KC	24	5	3	16	630	713	−83	13
12	Gyöngyösi KK	24	5	3	16	618	752	−134	13
13	Debreceni KSE	24	3	3	18	661	798	−137	9

Champion Playoff
5 to 8 Playoff
Relegation Round

Pld - Played; W - Won; L - Lost; PF - Points for; PA - Points against; Diff - Difference; Pts - Points.

=== Results ===
In the table below the home teams are listed on the left and the away teams along the top.

== Champion play-off ==
=== Semifinals ===
Team 1	Score	Team 2
MKB Veszprém	2 – 0	Dunaferr SE

13 April 2010; 17:00	MKB Veszprém	34 – 19	Dunaferr SE	Veszprém Aréna, Veszprém; Attendance: 2,000; Referees: Baranyi, Szloska
13 April 2010; 17:00	Sulić, Terzić 6	(17–13)	Kopčo 5	Veszprém Aréna, Veszprém; Attendance: 2,000; Referees: Baranyi, Szloska
13 April 2010; 17:00	3× (yellow card) 2× (suspension)	Report	2× (yellow card) 3× (suspension)	Veszprém Aréna, Veszprém; Attendance: 2,000; Referees: Baranyi, Szloska

27 April 2010; 18:30	Dunaferr SE	27 – 34	MKB Veszprém	Dunaferr Sportcsarnok, Dunaújváros; Attendance: 700; Referees: Nagy, Túróczy
27 April 2010; 18:30	Takács 7	(14–16)	Iváncsik 11	Dunaferr Sportcsarnok, Dunaújváros; Attendance: 700; Referees: Nagy, Túróczy
27 April 2010; 18:30	3× (yellow card) 2× (suspension)	Report	3× (yellow card) 4× (suspension) 1× (red card)	Dunaferr Sportcsarnok, Dunaújváros; Attendance: 700; Referees: Nagy, Túróczy

Team 1	Score	Team 2
Pick Szeged	2 – 0	Tatabánya KC

2 April 2010; 18:00	Pick Szeged	27 – 26	Tatabánya KC	Városi Sportcsarnok, Szeged; Attendance: 2,000; Referees: Nagy, Túróczy
2 April 2010; 18:00	Krivokapić, Žvižej 5	(16–11)	Harsányi 8	Városi Sportcsarnok, Szeged; Attendance: 2,000; Referees: Nagy, Túróczy
2 April 2010; 18:00	2× (yellow card) 4× (suspension)	Report	2× (yellow card) 7× (suspension)	Városi Sportcsarnok, Szeged; Attendance: 2,000; Referees: Nagy, Túróczy

25 April 2010; 18:30	Tatabánya KC	30 – 32	Pick Szeged	Földi Imre Sportcsarnok, Tatabánya; Attendance: 1,000; Referees: Andorka, Hucker
25 April 2010; 18:30	Harsányi 9	(19–17)	Žvižej 12	Földi Imre Sportcsarnok, Tatabánya; Attendance: 1,000; Referees: Andorka, Hucker
25 April 2010; 18:30	2× (yellow card) 7× (suspension)	Report	2× (yellow card) 4× (suspension)	Földi Imre Sportcsarnok, Tatabánya; Attendance: 1,000; Referees: Andorka, Hucker

=== 3rd Place ===
Team 1	Score	Team 2
Tatabánya KC	3 – 1	Dunaferr SE

9 May 2010; 16:00	Tatabánya KC	31 – 21	Dunaferr SE	Földi Imre Sportcsarnok, Tatabánya; Attendance: 1,000; Referees: Horváth, Márton
9 May 2010; 16:00	Harsányi 10	(12–7)	Nagy, Széles 6	Földi Imre Sportcsarnok, Tatabánya; Attendance: 1,000; Referees: Horváth, Márton
9 May 2010; 16:00	2× (yellow card) 6× (suspension)	Report	3× (yellow card) 5× (suspension) 1× (red card)	Földi Imre Sportcsarnok, Tatabánya; Attendance: 1,000; Referees: Horváth, Márton

16 May 2010; 19:10	Dunaferr SE	26 – 24	Tatabánya KC	Dunaferr Sportcsarnok, Dunaújváros; Attendance: 700; Referees: Nagy, Túróczy
16 May 2010; 19:10	Nagy 12	(15–9)	Sutka 7	Dunaferr Sportcsarnok, Dunaújváros; Attendance: 700; Referees: Nagy, Túróczy
16 May 2010; 19:10	3× (yellow card) 1× (suspension) 1× (red card)	Report	3× (yellow card) 3× (suspension)	Dunaferr Sportcsarnok, Dunaújváros; Attendance: 700; Referees: Nagy, Túróczy

23 May 2010; 17:00	Tatabánya KC	32 – 26	Dunaferr SE	Földi Imre Sportcsarnok, Tatabánya; Attendance: 1,000; Referees: Nagy, Túróczy
23 May 2010; 17:00	Díaz 8	(14–12)	Nagy 6	Földi Imre Sportcsarnok, Tatabánya; Attendance: 1,000; Referees: Nagy, Túróczy
23 May 2010; 17:00	2× (yellow card) 7× (suspension)	Report	3× (yellow card) 5× (suspension) 1× (red card)	Földi Imre Sportcsarnok, Tatabánya; Attendance: 1,000; Referees: Nagy, Túróczy

26 May 2010; 19:30	Dunaferr SE	25 – 33	Tatabánya KC	Dunaferr Sportcsarnok, Dunaújváros; Attendance: 700; Referees: Herczeg, Südi
26 May 2010; 19:30	Kurbely, Széles 6	(9–14)	Harsányi 7	Dunaferr Sportcsarnok, Dunaújváros; Attendance: 700; Referees: Herczeg, Südi
26 May 2010; 19:30	2× (yellow card) 2× (suspension)	Report	3× (yellow card) 2× (suspension)	Dunaferr Sportcsarnok, Dunaújváros; Attendance: 700; Referees: Herczeg, Südi

=== Finals ===
Team 1	Score	Team 2
MKB Veszprém	3 – 0	Pick Szeged

9 May 2010; 11:40	MKB Veszprém	41 – 31	Pick Szeged	Veszprém Aréna, Veszprém; Attendance: 5,000; Referees: Dobrovits, Tájok
9 May 2010; 11:40	Vujin 6	(21–13)	Žvižej 9	Veszprém Aréna, Veszprém; Attendance: 5,000; Referees: Dobrovits, Tájok
9 May 2010; 11:40	3× (yellow card) 3× (suspension) 1× (red card)	Report	2× (yellow card) 4× (suspension)	Veszprém Aréna, Veszprém; Attendance: 5,000; Referees: Dobrovits, Tájok

16 May 2010; 11:40	Pick Szeged	31 – 32	MKB Veszprém	Városi Sportcsarnok, Szeged; Attendance: 3,500; Referees: Kékes, Kékes
16 May 2010; 11:40	Žvižej 13	(13–14)	three players 7	Városi Sportcsarnok, Szeged; Attendance: 3,500; Referees: Kékes, Kékes
16 May 2010; 11:40	3× (yellow card) 6× (suspension)	Report	3× (yellow card) 3× (suspension) 2× (red card)	Városi Sportcsarnok, Szeged; Attendance: 3,500; Referees: Kékes, Kékes

23 May 2010; 12:05	MKB Veszprém	40 – 28	Pick Szeged	Veszprém Aréna, Veszprém; Attendance: 5,000; Referees: Kékes, Kékes
23 May 2010; 12:05	three players 6	(22–12)	Žvižej 8	Veszprém Aréna, Veszprém; Attendance: 5,000; Referees: Kékes, Kékes
23 May 2010; 12:05	2× (yellow card) 5× (suspension)	Report	3× (yellow card) 4× (suspension)	Veszprém Aréna, Veszprém; Attendance: 5,000; Referees: Kékes, Kékes

=== Final standings ===
	Team	Pld	W	D	L	GF	GA	Diff	Pts	Qualification
1	MKB Veszprém	5	5	0	0	181	136	+45	10	2010–11 EHF Champions League group stage
2	Pick Szeged	5	2	0	3	149	169	−20	4	2010–11 EHF Champions League group stage
3	Tatabánya KC	6	3	0	3	176	157	+19	6	2010–11 EHF Cup round 3
4	Dunaferr SE	6	1	0	5	144	188	−44	2	2010–11 EHF Cup round 3

Pld - Played; W - Won; L - Lost; PF - Points for; PA - Points against; Diff - Difference; Pts - Points.

== 5 to 8 play-off ==
=== Final standings ===
	Team	Pld	W	D	L	GF	GA	Diff	Pts	Qualification
5	Balatonfüredi KSE	6	2	3	1	143	139	+4	7	2010–11 EHF Cup Winners' Cup round 2
6	PLER KC	6	2	2	2	175	164	+11	6	
7	Csurgói KK	6	3	0	3	137	146	−9	6	
8	Kecskemét SE	6	2	1	3	144	150	−6	5	

Pld - Played; W - Won; L - Lost; PF - Points for; PA - Points against; Diff - Difference; Pts - Points.

=== Results ===
In the table below the home teams are listed on the left and the away teams along the top.

	PLE	CSU	KSE	BAL
PLER		32–24	25–28	26–26
Csurgó	27–35		19–14	20–22
Kecskemét	33–31	24–25		21–21
Balatonfüred	26–26	19–22	29–24	

== Relegation round ==
=== Final standings ===
	Team	Pld	W	D	L	GF	GA	Diff	Pts	Relegation
9	Ferencvárosi TC	6	4	0	2	163	149	+14	8	
10	Mezőkövesdi KC	6	3	2	1	164	158	+6	8	
11	Debreceni KSE	6	2	1	3	176	182	−6	5	Relegation to the 2010–11 Nemzeti Bajnokság I/B
12	Gyöngyösi KK	6	1	1	4	158	172	−14	3	Relegation to the 2010–11 Nemzeti Bajnokság I/B

Pld - Played; W - Won; L - Lost; PF - Points for; PA - Points against; Diff - Difference; Pts - Points.

=== Results ===
In the table below the home teams are listed on the left and the away teams along the top.

	FTC	MEZ	GYÖ	DEB
Ferencvárosi TC		33–25	26–19	31–29
Mezőkövesd	23–22		27–23	38–29
Gyöngyös	30–25	35–35		28–34
Debrecen	23–26	26–26	35–33	
