= Jakov Vranković =

Croatian handball player (born 1993)

Personal information
- Nationality: Croat
- Born: 12 June 1993 (age 33) Split, Croatia
- Height: 2.00 m (6 ft 7 in)

Sport
- Sport: Handball
- Position: Right back
- Current club: Dinamo București
- Number: 93

Senior clubs
- Years: Team
- 2011–2013: RK Split
- 2013: Al-Rayyan
- 2013–2014: Dijon Bourgogne Handball
- 2014–2017: CS Dinamo București
- 2017–2019: Tatabánya KC
- 2019–2021: CS Dinamo București
National team
Years	Team	Apps	(Gls)
2017–	Croatia	22	(40)
Medal record
Mediterranean Games
Gold medal – first place	2018 Tarragona	Team
European Junior Championship
Silver medal – second place	2012 Turkey	Team

Jakov Vranković (born 12 June 1993) is a Croatian handball player who plays for Dinamo București and the Croatian national team.

He participated at the 2019 World Men's Handball Championship.

== Individual awards ==
- Romanian Liga Națională Best Foreign Player: 2015
- Prosport All-Star Right Back of the Romanian Liga Națională: 2017
