= Milan Golubović =

Serbian handball player (born 2000)

Personal information
- Nationality: Serbian
- Born: 21 September 2000 (age 26) Belgrade, Serbia
- Height: 1.90 m (6 ft 3 in)

Sport
- Sport: Handball
- Position: Right back
- Current club: Gyöngyösi KK
- Number: 61

Senior clubs
- Years: Team
- 2019–2023: (Serbia) RK Dinamo Pančevo
- 2023–2024: (Serbia) RK Vojvodina
- 2024–2025: (Hungary) MOL Tatabánya KC
- 2025–2026: (Austria) HSG Bärnbach/Köflach
- 2026-: (Hungary) Gyöngyösi KK
National team
Years	Team	Apps	(Gls)
–	Serbia	6	(2)
Medal record
Mediterranean Games
Bronze medal – third place	2022 Oran

Milan Golubović (Serbian: Милан Голубовић; born 21 September 2000) is a Serbian handball player who plays for Gyöngyösi KK and the Serbia national team.

== Career ==
=== Club ===
The 1.90-meter-tall (6.2 ft) right back started his career in Serbia in RK Dinamo Pančevo. He participated with RK Dinamo Pančevo in the 2019–20 EHF Challenge Cup and the 2022–23 EHF European Cup. In 2023, the team reached the finals of the Serbian Cup, but lost there to the RK Vojvodina team, and won the silver medal in the cup. He has been playing in the Serbian club RK Vojvodina since 2023. With RK Vojvodina, he won the Serbian championship in 2024 and won a silver medal in the Serbian Cup. In June 2024, it was announced that he would transfer to the number three Hungarian club, MOL Tatabánya KC, from the summer. In June 2025, it was announced that he would join Austrian side HSG Bärnbach/Köflach in the summer. For the 2026/2027 season, it was announced that he is going back to Hungary, signing for Gyöngyösi KK.

=== National team ===
He won a bronze medal with the Serbia at the 2022 Mediterranean Games.

== Honours ==
=== Club ===
RK Dinamo Pančevo

- Serbian Cup:
  - Silver: 2023

RK Vojvodina

- Serbian League:
  - Gold: 2024
- Serbian Cup:
  - Silver: 2024

MOL Tatabánya KC

- Magyar Kupa
  - Bronze: 2025
