= Baptiste Damatrin =

French handball player (born 2000)

Personal information
- Full name: Baptiste Damatrin-Bertrand
- Born: 29 April 2000 (age 26) Saint-Maurice, France
- Height: 1.77 m (5 ft 10 in)

Sport
- Sport: Handball
- Position: Left wing
- Current club: MOL Tatabánya KC
- Number: 11

Youth career
- Years: Team
- 2009–2017: US Créteil Handball

Senior clubs
- Years: Team
- 2017–2018: (France) US Créteil Handball
- 2018–2024: (France) HBC Nantes
- 2024–: (Hungary) MOL Tatabánya KC
National team
- Years: Team
- –: France junior

Baptiste Damatrin (born 29 April 2000) is a French professional handball player for MOL Tatabánya KC.

== Career ==
=== Club ===
He started playing handball at the age of 9 in US Créteil Handball. He was only 18 years old when he played 2 matches for US Créteil Handball's first team in April 2018, scoring 15 goals, earning him LNH Division 1 Player of the Month for April. In the summer of 2018, he received the Paris talent of the year trophy. He joined HBC Nantes in the summer of 2018. In November 2018, he also made his debut in the EHF Champions League against RK Zagreb. He also played in the EHF European League for HBC Nantes. In June 2024, it was announced that he would transfer to the number three Hungarian club, MOL Tatabánya KC, from the summer. After 2017, the MOL Tatabánya KC team won bronze in the Hungarian Cup, Baptiste did not score a goal in the bronze medal match. In 2026, the team reached the final of the Hungarian Cup, but were defeated there by ONE Veszprém. Baptiste scored 1 goal in the final.

=== National team ===
He was included in the large squad of the 2022 European Men's Handball Championship, but in the end he will not become a member of the narrow squad. He was included in the large squad of the 2024 European Men's Handball Championship, but in the end he will not become a member of the narrow squad.

== Honours ==
=== Club ===
HBC Nantes

- LNH Division 1
  - Silver: 2020, 2022, 2024
  - Bronze: 2021, 2023
- Coupe de France
  - Gold: 2023, 2024
  - Silver: 2022
- Coupe de la Ligue
  - Gold: 2022
- Trophée des Champions
  - Gold: 2022
  - Silver: 2023

MOL Tatabánya KC

- EHF European Cup:
  - Silver: 2026
- Nemzeti Bajnokság I:
  - Bronze: 2026
- Magyar Kupa
  - Silver: 2026
  - Bronze: 2025
