= Andrej Pergel =

Serbian-Hungarian handball player (born 2003)

Personal information
- Nationality: Serbian / Hungarian
- Born: 18 June 2003 (age 23) Senta, Serbia
- Height: 1.97 m (6 ft 6 in)

Sport
- Sport: Handball
- Position: Left Back
- Current club: Dinamo București
- Number: 17

Youth career
- Years: Team
- 2018–2020: NEKA

Senior clubs
- Years: Team
- 2020–2023: (Hungary) Telekom Veszprém
- 2022–2023: → (Hungary) MOL Tatabánya KC (loan)
- 2023–2024: (Hungary) MOL Tatabánya KC
- 2024–2026: (Spain) BM Logroño La Rioja
- 2026–: (Romania) Dinamo București
National team
| Years | Team | Apps | (Gls) |
| 2025– | Hungary | 3 | (10) |
Medal record
Junior World Championship
| Silver medal – second place | 2023 Germany/Greece |

Andrej Pergel (born 18 June 2003) is a Serbian-Hungarian handball player who plays for Dinamo București.

== Career ==
=== Club ===
Andrej started his career at National Handball Academy (NEKA). In February 2020, he transferred to Hungarian record champion Telekom Veszprém, where he initially played in the second division. He made his debut in the first team, Nemzeti Bajnokság I, on 4 December 2021: Dabas KK-Telekom Veszprém 21–34, scored 3 goals. In this 2021/2022 season, he played a total of 7 games in the first team, in which he scored 7 goals. In Telekom Veszprém's second team, Nemzeti Bajnokság I/B, he scored 173 goals in 25 games. For the 2022/23 season, he was loaned to the MOL Tatabánya KC team for one year. In 2023, MOL Tatabánya KC bought it permanently from Telekom Veszprém. In the 2023/24 season, it finished third in the league and qualified for the EHF European League. He scored 16 goals in 6 matches in the EHF European League. From the summer of 2024, he transferred to the Spanish BM Logroño La Rioja team. In June 2026, Romanian champions Dinamo București announced the signing of Pergel on a two-year contract.

=== National team ===
He was 9th with the Hungarian team at the 2021 Youth European Championship. As a member of the junior national team, he participated in the 2022 Junior European Championship where the Hungarian team became the 5th. He participated in the 2023 Junior World Championship, where Hungary won the silver medal. He was included in the large squad of the 2025 World Men's Handball Championship, but in the end he will not become a member of the narrow squad. He made his debut for the Hungarian men's adult national team on 7 May 2025, in Hlohovec, in a European Championship qualifying match against Slovakia, where the Hungarian national team defeated the Slovak national team 39–24. Andrej scored 2 goals in the match. He also participated in the 2026 European Men's Handball Championship as a member of the Hungary men's national handball team. (10th place, 5 games / 4 goals).

== Honours ==
=== National team ===
- Junior World Championship:
  - Silver: 2023

=== Club ===
BFKA-Veszprém

- Nemzeti Bajnokság I/B
  - Silver: 2021

MOL Tatabánya KC

- Nemzeti Bajnokság I
  - Bronze: 2023, 2024

BM Logroño La Rioja

- Liga ASOBAL
  - Silver: 2026

Dinamo București

- Romanian Super Cup
  - Gold: 2026
