= Nemanja Obradović (handballer) =

Serbian handball player (born 1991)

Personal information
- Nationality: Serbian
- Born: 8 January 1991 (age 35) Kruševac, SR Serbia, SFR Yugoslavia
- Height: 2.00 m (6 ft 7 in)

Sport
- Sport: Handball
- Position: Left and Central back

Senior clubs
- Years: Team
- –: Napredak Kruševac
- 2011–2013: Jagodina
- 2013–2015: Metaloplastika
- 2015–2016: Valence
- 2016–2017: Metalurg Skopje
- 2017–2019: Wisła Płock
- 2019–2020: Meshkov Brest
- 2020–2021: Zagreb
- 2021–2022: Eurofarm Pelister
- 2022–2023: Tatabánya
- 2023–2025: Partizan
- 2025–: Crvena zvezda
National team
Years	Team	Apps	(Gls)
2017–?	Serbia	20	(26)

Nemanja Obradović (born 8 January 1991) is a Serbian handball player who last played for Crvena zvezda and for the Serbian national team.
