= Piotr Wyszomirski =

Polish handball player (born 1988)

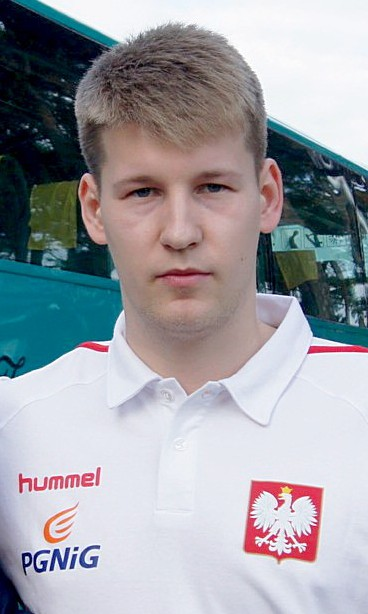

Personal information
- Nationality: Polish
- Born: 6 January 1988 (age 38) Warsaw, Poland
- Height: 1.95 m (6 ft 5 in)

Sport
- Sport: Handball
- Position: Goalkeeper
- Current club: Grundfos Tatabánya KC
- Number: 1

Youth career
- Years: Team
- 1998–2004: UKS Wilanowia Warszawa
- 2004–2007: SMS Gdańsk

Senior clubs
- Years: Team
- 2007–2012: KS Azoty-Puławy
- 2012–2014: Csurgói KK
- 2014–2016: SC Pick Szeged
- 2016–2020: TBV Lemgo
- 2020–: Grundfos Tatabánya KC
National team
Years	Team	Apps	(Gls)
2009–2021	Poland	134	(3)
Medal record
World Championship
Bronze medal – third place	2015 Qatar

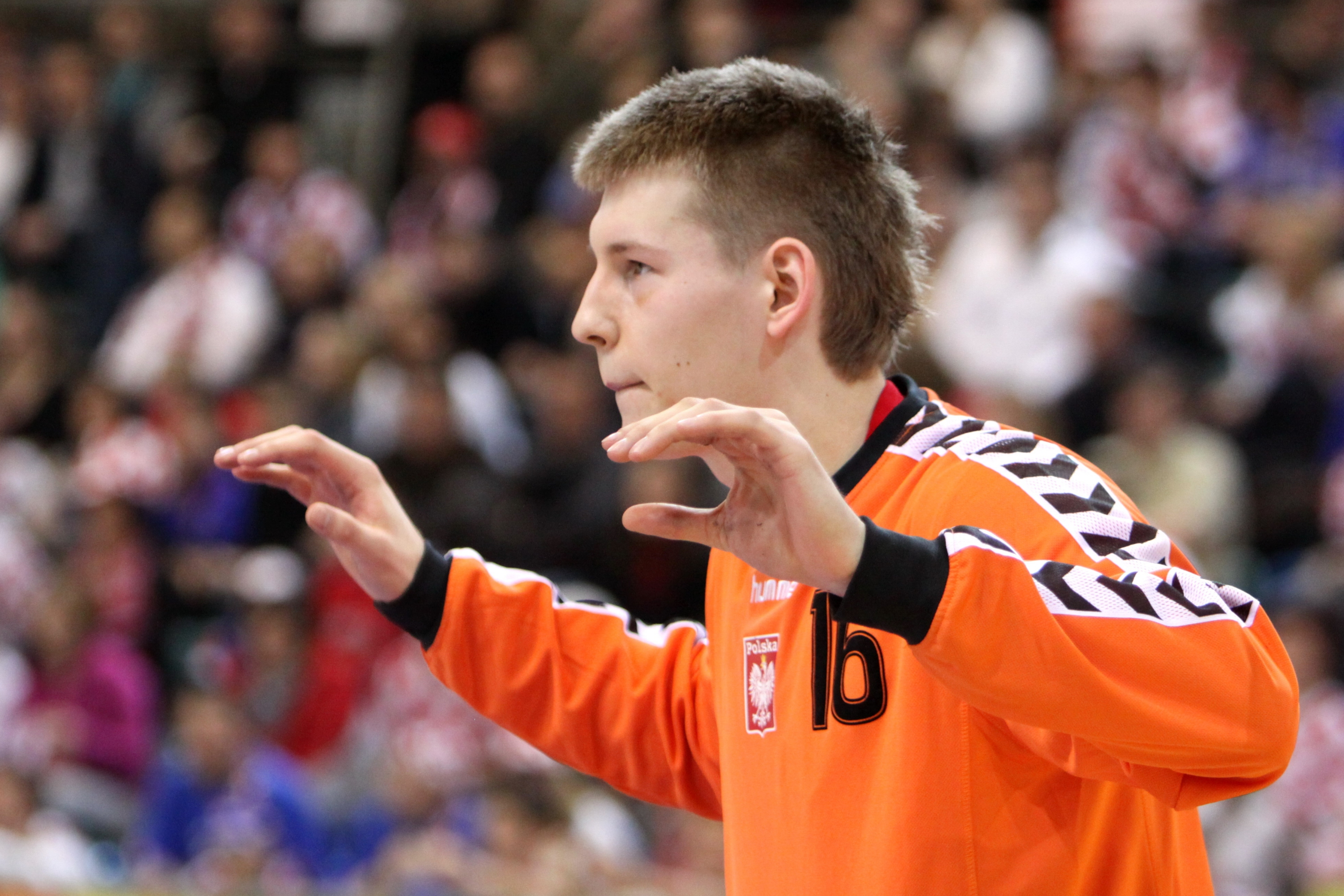
Piotr Wyszomirski during a game for the national team.

Piotr Wyszomirski (born 6 January 1988) is a Polish handball player for Grundfos Tatabánya KC.

On 1 February 2015, Poland, including Wyszomirski, won the bronze medal of the 2015 World Championship.

He also participated at the 2016 Summer Olympics in Rio de Janeiro, in the men's handball tournament.
