= Miloš Božović =

Montenegrin handball player (born 1994)

Personal information
- Nationality: Montenegrin
- Born: 10 December 1994 (age 31) Budva, FR Yugoslavia
- Height: 1.99 m (6 ft 6 in)

Sport
- Sport: Handball
- Position: Left back
- Current club: Győri ETO-UNI FKC
- Number: 2

Senior clubs
- Years: Team
- –: RK Budvanska Rivijera
- –: BM Ciudad Real
- –: BM Valladolid
- –2016: RK Gorenje Velenje
- 2016–2019: Tatabánya KC
- 2020: RK Zagreb
- 2020–2021: Tatabánya KC
- 2021–2024: US Ivry Handball
- 2024–: Győri ETO-UNI FKC
National team
Years	Team	Apps	(Gls)
–	Montenegro	51	(115)

Miloš Božović (born 10 December 1994) is a Montenegrin handball player for Győri ETO-UNI FKC and the Montenegrin national team.
