= Márton Székely =

Hungarian handball player (born 1990)

Personal information
- Nationality: Hungarian
- Born: 2 January 1990 (age 36) Budapest, Hungary
- Height: 1.94 m (6 ft 4 in)

Sport
- Sport: Handball
- Position: Goalkeeper
- Current club: Tatabánya KC
- Number: 12

Youth career
- Years: Team
- –2001: Malév SC
- 2001–2007: PLER KC

Senior clubs
- Years: Team
- 2007–2013: PLER KC
- 2013–2015: Balatonfüredi KSE
- 2015–2016: Csurgói KK
- 2016–2019: Tatabánya KC
- 2019–2021: Telekom Veszprém
- 2021: → FC Porto (loan)
- 2021–2022: RK Eurofarm Pelister
- 2022–: Tatabánya KC
National team
Years	Team	Apps	(Gls)
2013–	Hungary	84	(3)

Márton Székely (born 2 January 1990) is a Hungarian handball player for Tatabánya KC and the Hungarian national team.

He represented Hungary at the 2019 World Men's Handball Championship.

== Honours ==
=== Club ===
PLER KC

- Magyar Kupa
  - Silver: 2011

Balatonfüredi KSE

- Nemzeti Bajnokság I
  - Bronze: 2014

Grundfos Tatabánya KC

- EHF European Cup:
  - Silver: 2026
- Nemzeti Bajnokság I
  - Bronze: 2017, 2018, 2019, 2023, 2024, 2026
- Magyar Kupa
  - Silver: 2026
  - Bronze: 2017, 2025

Telekom Veszprém

- SEHA League
  - Gold: 2020

FC Porto

- Portuguese League
  - Gold: 2021
- Portuguese Cup
  - Gold: 2021

RK Eurofarm Pelister

- Macedonian Handball Super Cup
  - Gold: 2021

=== Individual ===
- Hungarian Goalkeeper of the Year: 2018
