= Jakab Sibalin =

Hungarian handball player (born 1965)

Jakab Sibalin (born 12 May 1965 in Esztergom) is a former Hungarian handballer, who played for the club Tatabányai Bányász and the Hungarian national team. He participated at the 1988 Summer Olympics, where the Hungarian team placed fourth, and at the 1992 Summer Olympics, where the team placed seventh. Sibalin also played on the 1990 World Championship and achieved a respectable sixth place.

== Awards ==
- Hungarian Handballer of the Year: 1990
