= Alireza Mousavi =

Iranian handball player (born 1990)

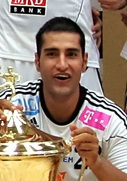
- Mousavi in 2013

Personal information
- Full name: Seyed Alireza Mousavi Ghalehmirzamani
- Nationality: Iranian
- Born: 27 April 1990 (age 36) Isfahan, Iran
- Height: 1.95 m (6 ft 5 in)

Sport
- Sport: Handball
- Position: Line Player
- Current club: CSM Bacău
- Number: 88

Senior clubs
- Years: Team
- –2013: Sepahan
- 2013–2014: MVM Veszprém KC
- 2013–2014: → PLER KC (loan)
- 2014–2015: Tatabánya KC
- 2015–2022: Dinamo București
- 2022–2024: Steaua București
- 2024–2025: CSM Bacău
- 2025–: Universitatea Cluj
National team
Years	Team	Apps	(Gls)
–	Iran	97	(360)

Alireza Mousavi (Persian: علیرضا موسوی, born 27 April 1990) is an Iranian handball.

== Achievements ==
- Nemzeti Bajnokság I:
  - Bronze Medalist: 2015
- Liga Națională:
  - Winner: 2016
