= Josip Perić =

Bosnian-Herzegovinian handball player

Personal information
- Nationality: Bosnian-Herzegovinian
- Born: 5 June 1992 (age 34) Zagreb, Croatia
- Height: 1.80 m (5 ft 11 in)

Sport
- Sport: Handball
- Position: Center back
- Current club: Kadetten Schaffhausen
- Number: 10

Senior clubs
- Years: Team
- –: HRK Izviđač
- –: RK Bosna Sarajevo
- 2014–2015: Tatabánya KC
- 2015–2016: Qatar SC
- 2016–2017: HC Odorheiu Secuiesc
- 2017–2018: AHC Dunărea Călărași
- 2018–2020: Frisch Auf Göppingen
- 2020–2022: RK Eurofarm Pelister
- 2022–2024: Tatabánya KC
- 2024–2025: Olympiacos
- 2025–: Kadetten Schaffhausen
National team
Years	Team	Apps	(Gls)
2013–	Bosnia and Herzegovina	41	(49)

Josip Perić (born 5 June 1992) is a Bosnian-Herzegovinian professional handball player for Kadetten Schaffhausen and the Bosnian national handball team.
