= Damian Przytuła =

Polish handball player

Personal information
- Nationality: Polish
- Born: 27 November 1998 (age 27) Olsztyn, Poland
- Height: 2.00 m (6 ft 7 in)

Sport
- Sport: Handball
- Position: Left back
- Current club: CSM București
- Number: 37

Senior clubs
- Years: Team
- 2015–2016: (Poland) ITS Jeziorak Iława
- 2016–2017: (Poland) Warmia Olsztyn
- 2017–2021: (Poland) MMTS Kwidzyn
- 2017–2018: → (Poland) Pomezania Malbork (loan)
- 2021–2024: (Poland) Górnik Zabrze
- 2024–02/2025: (Hungary) MOL Tatabánya KC
- 02/2025–2026: (Croatia) RK Zagreb
- 2026–: (Romania) CSM București
National team
Years	Team	Apps	(Gls)
2018–	Poland	58	(112)
- Updated on 14 January 2026

Damian Przytuła (born 27 November 1998) is a Polish professional handball player for CSM București and the Polish national team.

== Career ==
=== Club ===
Damian started his career in the third division ITS Jeziorak Iława. In the 2015/2016 season, he played 10 matches in the third division and scored 56 goals. Despite being Jeziorak's youngest player, he was the team's second most successful player. He was then confirmed by the second division Warmia Olsztyn. He also spent only one season here, in 2017 he was signed by the first division MMTS Kwidzyn. He made his debut in the first division, the Superliga, on 22 November 2017, in a loss against KS Azoty-Puławy (18:27), in which he scored two goals. In the 2017/2018 season, he played in 21 matches in the Superliga and scored 26 goals. In the 2017/2018 season, he was temporarily on loan in the second division team of Pomezania Malbork (11 games and 21 goals). He was confirmed by Górnik Zabrze in 2021. In June 2024, it was announced that he would be moving to the number three Hungarian club, MOL Tatabánya KC, starting in the EHF European League, from the summer. He scored 20 goals in 8 matches in the EHF European League. At the end of February 2025, it was announced that the Croatian record champion RK Zagreb bought him from the MOL Tatabánya KC team and he transferred to the Croatian team with immediate effect.

=== National team ===
In 2016, he participated in the U-18 European Championship in Croatia, where he played 7 matches and scored 8 goals. In 2018, he played at the European U-20 Championship in Slovenia, where he played in 7 games and scored 5 goals. In December 2018, coach Piotr Przybecki invited him to the training camp of the Polish national team for the first time. He made his debut for the national team on 28 December 2018 against Japan. He scored his first goal on 3 January 2019 in a friendly match lost against Belarus (28:30). He also participated in the 2025 World Men's Handball Championship as a member of the Poland men's national handball team. (25th place, 7 matches / 26 goals).
