= Mateo Maraš =

Croatian handball player (born 2000)

Personal information
- Nationality: Croatian
- Born: 17 December 2000 (age 25) Split, Croatia
- Height: 2.03 m (6 ft 8 in)

Sport
- Sport: Handball
- Position: Right Back
- Current club: Paris Saint-Germain
- Number: 2

Senior clubs
- Years: Team
- 2018–2021: RK Balić-Metličić
- 2020–2021: → RK Eurofarm Pelister (loan)
- 2021–2022: RK Eurofarm Pelister
- 2022–2025: MOL Tatabánya KC
- 2025–: Paris Saint-Germain
National team
Years	Team	Apps	(Gls)
2021–	Croatia	53	(94)
Medal record
World Championship
Silver medal – second place	2025 Croatia/Denmark/Norway
European Championship
Bronze medal – third place	2026 Denmark/Norway/Sweden
- Updated on 2 February 2026

Mateo Maraš (born 17 December 2000) is a Croatian handball player for Paris Saint-Germain and for the Croatian national team.

== Career ==
=== Club ===
Mateo started his career in the RK Balic-Metlicic team from Split. In the 2020/21 season, he was loaned to North Macedonia's RK Eurofarm Pelister, with which he played in the EHF European League. In the spring of 2021, RK Eurofarm Pelister signed him permanently. There were other offers as well: from RK Zagreb, RK Celje, Ademar León and Fenix Toulouse Handball, but he decided on RK Eurofarm Pelister's offer. In 2022, the Hungarian top team MOL Tatabánya KC bought him from RK Eurofarm Pelister. He was also able to play in the EHF European League with MOL Tatabánya KC. In January 2025, it was announced that he would transfer to Paris Saint-Germain from the summer.

=== National team ===
On April 28, 2021, he played for the first time in the Croatia men's national handball team against Slovakia and scored 4 goals. He represented Croatia at the 2022 European Men's Handball Championship. He was included in the large squad of the 2023 World Men's Handball Championship. He also participated in the 2024 European Men's Handball Championship as a member of the Croatia men's national handball team. (11th place, 5 matches / 9 goals). He was included in the large squad of the men's handball team participating in the 2024 Paris Olympics, but in the end he was not included in the traveling team. He also participated in the 2025 World Men's Handball Championship as a member of the Croatia men's national handball team (2nd place, 9 matches / 25 goals) and 2026 European Men's Handba Championship (3rd place, 3 matches / 9 goals).

== Personal life ==
His father, Ivica Maraš, was also a national team handball player and was a member of the Croatian delegation for the 2022 European Men's Handball Championship.

== Honours ==
=== National team ===
- World Championship:
  - Silver: 2025
- European Championship:
  - Bronze: 2026

=== Club ===
RK Eurofarm Pelister

- Macedonian Handball Super League
  - Silver: 2021, 2022
- Macedonian Handball Cup
  - Silver: 2021, 2022
- Macedonian Handball Super Cup
  - Gold: 2021

MOL Tatabánya KC

- Nemzeti Bajnokság I
  - Bronze: 2023, 2024
- Magyar Kupa
  - Bronze: 2025

Paris Saint Germain

- LNH Division 1
- Gold: 2026
