= Matěj Havran =

Czech handball player

Personal information
- Nationality: Czech
- Born: 22 January 2002 (age 24) Vsetín, Czech Republic
- Height: 1.90 m (6 ft 3 in)

Sport
- Sport: Handball
- Position: Left back
- Current club: SKKP Handball Brno
- Number: 14

Youth career
- Years: Team
- 2019–2020: HC Zubří

Senior clubs
- Years: Team
- 2020–2024: (Czech Republic) HC Zubří
- 2024–2026: (Hungary) MOL Tatabánya KC
- 2026–: (Czech Republic) SKKP Handball Brno
National team
Years	Team	Apps	(Gls)
2022–	Czech Republic	33	(20)

Matěj Havran (born 22 January 2002) is a Czech handball player for SKKP Handball Brno and the Czech Republic national team.

== Career ==
=== Club ===
Matěj started his career at HC Zubří. He made his debut in the first team in September 2020 in the Czech Handball Extraliga. On the international stage, he made his debut in the EHF European Cup in the 2020/21 season. He scored 5 goals in 4 games. In the 2021/2022 season, he won a bronze medal with the team. In January 2024, it was announced that he would continue his career in the No. 3 Hungarian club, MOL Tatabánya KC, from the summer. After 2017, the MOL Tatabánya KC team won bronze in the Hungarian Cup, Matěj did not score a goal in the bronze medal match. In 2026, the team reached the final of the Hungarian Cup, but were defeated there by ONE Veszprém, Matej did not score a goal in the match. In the spring of 2026, the Polish top team, Wisła Płock, announced his signing. He suffered a severe knee injury in the first leg of the EHF European Cup final against GRK Ohrid, so Wisła Płock terminated his contract. In September 2026, SKKP Handball Brno announced his signing.

=== National team ===
He was included in the large squad of the 2022 European Men's Handball Championship, but in the end he will not become a member of the narrow squad. He made his debut for the national team on March 18, 2022, against Serbia. He also participated in the 2024 European Men's Handball Championship as a member of the Czech Republic men's national handball team. (15th place, 3 matches / 2 goals). He also participated in the 2025 World Men's Handball Championship as a member of the Czech Republic men's national handball team. (19th place, 6 matches / 9 goals). He also participated in the 2026 European Men's Handball Championship as a member of the Czech Republic men's national handball team. (17th place, 3 games / 1 goals).

== Honours ==
=== Club ===
HC Zubří

- Czech Handball Extraliga
  - Bronze: 2022

MOL Tatabánya KC

- EHF European Cup:
  - Silver: 2026
- Nemzeti Bajnokság I:
  - Bronze: 2026
- Magyar Kupa
  - Silver: 2026
  - Bronze: 2025
