= SKKP Handball Brno =

Czech handball club

- Short name: SKKP Brno
- Founded: 1920; 106 years ago
- Arena: STAREZ Aréna Vodova, Brno-Královo Pole
- Capacity: 2,900
- President: Eduard Kosek
- Head coach: Pavel Hladík
- League: Chance Extraliga
- Club colours
Home	Away

SKKP Handball Brno is a handball club from Brno, Czech Republic, that plays in the Chance Extraliga.

Location of SKKP Handball Brno

== Crest, colours, supporters ==
=== Kits ===
HOME
2014–16	2017–19	2020–22	2022–23	2023-24

AWAY
2017–19	2020–22	2023-24

THIRD

2021–23

== Sports hall information ==
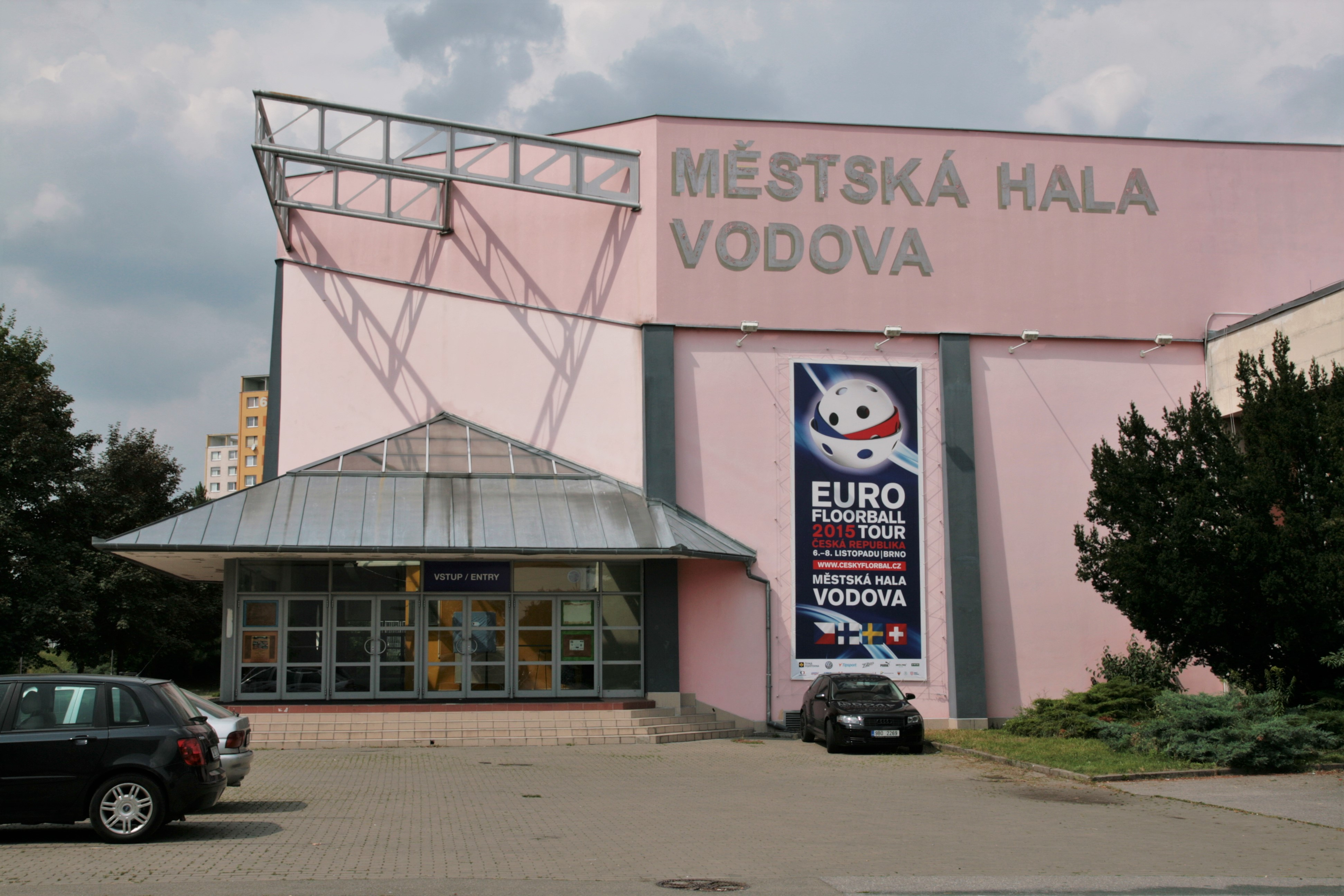
Home hall: STAREZ Aréna Vodova

- Name: – STAREZ Aréna Vodova
- City: – Brno-Královo Pole
- Capacity: – 2900
- Address: – Vodova 336/108, 612 00 Brno-Královo Pole, Czech Republic

== Management ==
Position	Name
President	(Czech Republic) Eduard Kosek
Sports Director	(Czech Republic) Pavel Hladík

== Team ==
=== Current squad ===
Squad for the 2023–24 season

SKKP Handball Brno

Goalkeepers

- 1 (Czech Republic) Tomaš Chmela
- 16 (Czech Republic) Vit Pyško
- 81 (Slovakia) Andrej Furman

Left Wingers

- 19 (Czech Republic) Radek Flajsar
- 95 (Czech Republic) Jakub Bosák

Right Wingers

- 8 (Czech Republic) Oliver Huska
- 24 (Czech Republic) Daniel Burget
- 93 (Czech Republic) Jan Zahradníček

Line Players

- 14 (Slovakia) Jakub Tóth
- 20 (Serbia) Nikola Sekulić
- 21 (Czech Republic) Ondřej Pazourek
- 32 (Czech Republic) Erik Žvak
- 39 (Czech Republic) Daniel Janda

Central Backs

- 5 (Japan) Hiroki Matsuoka
- 7 (Czech Republic) Martin Kocich
- 22 (Czech Republic) Šimon Erbes
- 33 (Czech Republic) Martin Flajšinger

Left Backs

- 3 (Czech Republic) Daniel Mahušek
- 10 (Slovakia) Vladimír Ratkovský
- 27 (North Macedonia) Dejan Kukulovski
- 41 (Czech Republic) Michal Kasal
- 42 (Czech Republic) Matouš Kolečkář

Right Backs

- 66 (Czech Republic) Adam Stein
- 99 (Montenegro) Luka Vukićević

=== Technical staff ===
- Head Coach: (Czech Republic) Pavel Hladík
- Goalkeeping Coach: (Czech Republic) Vojtěch Drápela
- Physiotherapist: (Czech Republic) Dušan Bartoš
- Physiotherapist: (Czech Republic) Petr Tomáš
- Fitness Coach: (Czech Republic) Sebastián Strack
- Masseur: (Czech Republic) Tomáš Petr
- Masseur: (Czech Republic) Dušan Bartoš
- Club Doctor: (Czech Republic) Tomáš Kovanda

=== Transfers ===
Transfers for the 2026–27 season

Joining

- (Czech Republic) Matěj Havran (LB) from (Hungary) MOL Tatabánya KC

Leaving

- (Czech Republic) Alexandr Moješcik (CB) to (Poland) Śląsk Wrocław

=== Transfer History ===
Transfers for the 2025–26 season

Joining

- (Greece) (Poland) Marko-Jan Terlecki (GK) from (Greece) AC Diomidis Argous
- (Czech Republic) Jiří Doležel (GK) from (Czech Republic) TJ Sokol Nové Veselí
- (Czech Republic) David Mazurek (RB) from (Hungary) Csurgói KK
- (Czech Republic) Martin Kocich (CB) from (Switzerland) Wacker Thun

Leaving

Transfers for the 2023–24 season

Joining

- (Montenegro) Luka Vukićević (RB) from (Iceland) Fram Reykjavík
- (North Macedonia) Dejan Kukulovski (LB) from (North Macedonia) RK Eurofarm Pelister 2
- (Japan) Hiroki Matsuoka (CB) from (Japan) Osaki Osol
- (Slovakia) Jakub Tóth (LP) from (Slovakia) HK agro Topoľčany
- (Slovakia) Andrej Furman (GK) from (Slovakia) HT Tatran Prešov
- (Czech Republic) Vit Pyško (GK) from (Czech Republic) SKP Frýdek-Místek

Leaving

- (Serbia) Živojin Ilić (GK) to (Serbia) RK Samot 65
- (Czech Republic) Dušan Živanov (RB) to (Czech Republic) HCB Karviná
- (Czech Republic) Bohumil Možíš (GK) to (Czech Republic) Házená Velká Bystřice
- (Slovenia) Luka Kikanović (LB)
- (Czech Republic) Bruno Ugrin (LP)

== EHF ranking ==
As of 23/11/2023

Rank	Team	Points
129	(North Macedonia) HC Butel Skopje	36
130	(France) Saint-Raphaël VHB	36
131	(Switzerland) GC Amicitia Zürich	36
132	(Czech Republic) SKKP Handball Brno	36
133	(Croatia) HRK Gorica	35
134	(Lithuania) VHC Šviesa	35
135	(Sweden) HK Malmö	34

== Former club members ==
=== Notable former players ===
- (Czech Republic) Michal Kasal (2022–)
