= Vladimir Vranješ =

Bosnian handball player

Personal information
- Nationality: Bosnian
- Born: 14 December 1988 (age 37) Banja Luka, Bosnia; SFR Yugoslavia
- Height: 2.00 m (6 ft 7 in)

Sport
- Sport: Handball
- Position: Pivot
- Current club: HSG Wetzlar

Senior clubs
- Years: Team
- 2004–2012: RK Borac m:tel
- 2012–2013: Ademar León
- 2013–2016: SC Pick Szeged
- 2016–2020: Tatabánya KC
- 2020–2022: HC Meshkov Brest
- 2022–2023: S.L. Benfica
- 2023–2025: HSG Wetzlar
- 2025–: Csurgói KK
National team
Years	Team	Apps	(Gls)
2009–2022	Bosnia and Herzegovina	82	(132)

Vladimir Vranješ (born 14 December 1988) is a Bosnian handball player for HSG Wetzlar. He was a part of the Bosnian national team for 12 years.

He previously played for Borac Banja Luka, RK Prijedor, RK Slovenj Gradec, Ademar Leon and SC Pick Szeged. Vranješ is a pivot known as a defensive specialist. He won the EHF Cup for 2013–14 season with Pick Szeged.
