= Máté Halász =

Hungarian handball player (born 1984)

Personal information
- Full name: Máté Halász
- Nationality: Hungarian
- Born: 2 June 1984 (age 42) Kecskemét, Hungary
- Height: 1.94 m (6 ft 4 in)

Sport
- Sport: Handball
- Position: Left Back/Left Wing
- Current club: Retired

Senior clubs
- Years: Team
- 2002–2005: (Hungary) SC Pick Szeged
- 2005–2011: (Hungary) Tatabánya-Carbonex KC
- 2011–2012: (Hungary) Gyöngyösi KK
- 2012–2014: (France) Massy Essonne Handball
- 2014–2015: (Hungary) SBS-Eger
- 2015–2016: (Austria) HSG Bärnbach/Köflach
- 2016–2017: (Hungary) Budakalász FKC
- 2017–2018: (Hungary) Vecsés SE
- 2018–2019: (Hungary) Kecskeméti TE
National team
| Years | Team | Apps | (Gls) |
| – | Hungary | 21 | (41) |
Medal record
Junior World Championship
| Bronze medal – third place | 2005 Hungary |
- Updated on 16 December 2011

Máté Halász (born 2 June 1984, in Kecskemét) is a Hungarian handballer who played for Gyöngyösi KK and the Hungarian national team.

== Achievements ==
- Nemzeti Bajnokság I:
  - Runner-up: 2003, 2004, 2005
- Magyar Kupa:
  - Runner-up: 2003, 2004, 2005
