= Ákos Pásztor =

Hungarian handball player (born 1991)

Personal information
- Nationality: Hungarian
- Born: 24 June 1991 (age 35) Miskolc, Hungary
- Height: 1.87 m (6 ft 2 in)

Sport
- Sport: Handball
- Position: Right wing
- Current club: Grundfos Tatabánya KC
- Number: 4

Senior clubs
- Years: Team
- 2010–2011: Dunaferr SE
- 2011–2020: Grundfos Tatabánya KC
- 2020–: Ceglédi KKSE
National team
Years	Team	Apps	(Gls)
2014–	Hungary	13	(22)

Ákos Pásztor (born 24 June 1991) is a Hungarian handballer who plays for Ceglédi KKSE and the Hungarian national team.
