= Ignacio Plaza Jiménez =

Spanish handball player (born 1994)

Personal information
- Born: 10 January 1994 (age 32) Ciudad Real, Spain
- Height: 1.95 m (6 ft 5 in)

Sport
- Sport: Handball
- Position: Pivot
- Current club: MOL Tatabánya KC
- Number: 17

Youth career
- Years: Team
- 2009–2010: BM Ciudad Real

Senior clubs
- Years: Team
- 2010–2012: (Spain) BM Ciudad Real
- 2012–2013: (Spain) AD Ciudad de Guadalajara
- 2013–2015: (Spain) BM Puerto Sagunto
- 2015–2018: (Germany) Füchse Berlin
- 2018–2019: (Germany) SC Magdeburg
- 2019–2022: (Greece) AEK Athens
- 2022–2024: (Portugal) FC Porto
- 2024–2026: (Hungary) MOL Tatabánya KC
- 2026–: (Spain) CB Caserío Ciudad Real
National team
- Years: Team
- –: Spain junior

Ignacio Plaza Jiménez (born 10 January 1994) is a Spanish handball player for MOL Tatabánya KC.

== Career ==
=== Club ===
The player nicknamed Nacho started his career at BM Ciudad Real. BM Ciudad Real was one of the best teams in the world at the time, with the best players in the world, so he only played a few games for the team. He made his debut in the EHF Champions League in the 2010/11 season, scoring 2 goals in 4 matches. In 2011, BM Ciudad Real moved to Madrid, the new name was Atlético Madrid. It was finally disbanded two years later. He played for AD Ciudad de Guadalajara in the 2012/2013 season. He then spent 2 years with the BM Puerto Sagunto team. In the 2015/16 season, he moved to the German Bundesliga club Füchse Berlin, with which he signed a three-year contract. He became the club world champion with Füchse Berlin in 2015 and 2016. In the 2017/18 season, he suffered a torn cruciate ligament and had to watch Füchse Berlin's EHF Cup win from the stands. From the summer of 2018, he signed a contract with SC Magdeburg. A year later, he moved to the Greek club AEK Athens. With AEK Athens, he won the Greek Championship in 2020 and 2021, the Greek Cup in 2021, and the EHF European Cup in 2021. In the summer of 2022, he joined the Portuguese first division FC Porto, with whom he won the Portuguese championship in 2023. In the spring of 2024, it was announced that he would transfer to the number three Hungarian club, MOL Tatabánya KC. After 2017, the MOL Tatabánya KC team won bronze in the Hungarian Cup, Nacho scored 3 goals in the bronze medal match. In 2026, the team reached the final of the Hungarian Cup, but were defeated there by ONE Veszprém. Nacho scored 3 goals in the final.

=== National team ===
He was 2th with the Spanish team at the 2011 Youth World Handball Championship and was selected to the tournament's all-star team. In 2012, he became the junior European champion with the team. He was 4th with the Spanish team at the 2013 World Youth Championship and was selected to the tournament's all-star team. As a member of the junior national team, he participated in the 2014 Junior European Men's Handball Championship, where the Spanish team finished 3rd and was selected to the tournament's all-star team.

== Honours ==
=== National team ===
- Youth World Championship:
  - Silver: 2011
- Junior European Championship:
  - Gold: 2012
- European Men's U-20 Handball Championship:
  - Bronze: 2014

=== Club ===
Füchse Berlin

- EHF Cup
  - Gold: 2018
  - Silver: 2017
- IHF Men's Super Globe
  - Gold: 2015, 2016
  - Silver: 2017

SC Magdeburg

- DHB-Pokal
  - Silver: 2019

AEK Athens

- EHF European Cup
  - Gold: 2021
- Greek Championship
  - Gold: 2020, 2021
  - Silver: 2022
- Greek Cup
  - Gold: 2021
  - Silver: 2022

FC Porto

- Portuguese League
  - Gold: 2023

MOL Tatabánya KC

- EHF European Cup:
  - Silver: 2026
- Nemzeti Bajnokság I:
  - Bronze: 2026
- Magyar Kupa
  - Silver: 2026
  - Bronze: 2025

=== Individual ===
- All-Star Line Player of the Youth World Championship: 2011
- All-Star Line Player of the World Youth Championship: 2013
- All-Star Line Player of the European Men's U-20 Handball Championship: 2014
