= Club Balonmano Caserío Ciudad Real =

Spanish handball club

- Full name: Club Balonmano Caserío Ciudad Real
- Founded: 27 July 2011; 15 years ago
- Arena: Quijote Arena, Ciudad Real
- Capacity: 5,863
- President: Julian Amores
- Head coach: Santi Urdiales
- League: Liga ASOBAL

Club Balonmano Caserío Ciudad Real is a Spanish handball club playing in the ASOBAL league.

The club was created on 27 July 2011 by fan associations of BM Ciudad Real. They sought to cover the vacant place in Ciudad Real left by the relocation of BM Ciudad Real to Madrid (and renaming to 'Atlético de Madrid').

In May 2025, the club promoted to the 2025–26 ASOBAL league, the top flight of the Spanish handball system.

== Team ==
=== Current squad ===
Squad for the 2026–27 season

Goalkeepers

- (Argentina) Juan Bar

Left Wingers

- (Spain) Sergio López García

Right Wingers

- (Spain) David Cadarso

Line players

- (Iceland) Thorgils Baldursson
- (Spain) Ignacio Plaza Jiménez

Left Backs

- (Bosnia and Herzegovina) Adi Omeragić
- (Spain) Javier Domingo Asensi

Central Backs

- (Egypt) Omar Salem
- (Spain) Sergi Mach Eijo
- (Spain) Aitor Albizu

Right Backs

- (Spain) Jorge Maqueda
- (Spain) Alonso Moreno Guirao

=== Transfers ===
Transfers for the 2026–27 season

Joining

- (Argentina) Juan Bar (GK) from (Spain) BM Atlético Valladolid
- (Bosnia and Herzegovina) Adi Omeragić (LB) from (Austria) HSG Bärnbach/Köflach
- (Iceland) Thorgils Baldursson (LP) from (Sweden) HF Karlskrona
- (Egypt) Omar Salem (CB) from (Greece) AEK Athens
- (Spain) Jorge Maqueda (RB) from (Poland) Industria Kielce
- (Spain) Ignacio Plaza Jiménez (LP) from (Hungary) MOL Tatabánya KC
- (Spain) Aitor Albizu (CB) from (Spain) CB Ademar León
- (Spain) David Cadarso (RW) from (Spain) BM Logroño La Rioja

Leaving

- (Argentina) Pablo Mínguez (LB) to (Spain) CB Pozuelo
- (Egypt) Omar Sherif Abdelaziz (LP) to (Egypt) Al Ahly
- (Greece) Konstantinos Kotanidis (GK) to (Greece) AEK Athens
- (Brazil) Guilherme Linhares (RB) to (Greece) AEK Athens
- (Spain) Carlos Ocaña (LB) to (Greece) AEK Athens
- (Spain) Adrián Trancón (RW) to (Spain) CB Melilla
- (Spain) Jorge Romanillos (LP) to (Spain) BM Villa de Aranda
- (Spain) José Andrés Torres (LP) to (Spain) BM Huesca
- (Spain) Daniel Palomeque (RW) to (Spain) CB Ciudad de Málaga
- (Spain) Ángel Pérez de Inestrosa (CB)

=== Transfer History ===
Transfers for the 2025–26 season

Joining

- (Greece) Konstantinos Kotanidis (GK) from (Greece) Olympiacos
- (Brazil) Guilherme Linhares (RB) from (Spain) BM Cisne
- (Egypt) Omar Sherif Abdelaziz (LP) from (Spain) CB Cangas
- (Spain) Alonso Moreno Guirao (RB) from (Spain) Helvetia Anaitasuna
- (Spain) Sergi Mach Eijo (CB) from (Spain) BM Rebi Cuenca
- (Spain) Sergio López García (LW) from (Spain) BM Rebi Cuenca
- (Spain) Javier Domingo Asensi (LB) to (Spain) Balonmano Burgos

Leaving

- (Serbia) Ognjen Radojičić (LB) to (North Macedonia) MRK Kumanovo
