= Zsolt Kontra =

Hungarian handball player (born 1955)

Zsolt Kontra (born August 23, 1955, in Sopron) is a former Hungarian handball player who competed in the 1976 Summer Olympics and in the 1980 Summer Olympics.

In 1976 he was part of the Hungarian team which finished sixth in the Olympic tournament. He played all five matches and scored seven goals.

Four years later he finished fourth with the Hungarian team in the 1980 Olympic tournament. He played all six matches and scored 30 goals.

== Awards ==
- Nemzeti Bajnokság I Top Scorer: 1979
