= Ivo Díaz =

Hungarian handball player (born 1972)

Ivo Luis Aldazabal Diaz (born 10 May 1972 in Matanzas) is a retired Cuban-Hungarian handball player who most recently played for Tatabánya-Carbonex KC. Previously he played for Hungarian record champions KC Veszprém and Spanish clubs CB Ademar León and JD Arrate.

Diaz represented the Hungarian national team in three major tournaments. He first participated on the 2004 European Men's Handball Championship, where he achieved the ninth place. Few months later he was selected to the team that finished fourth at the 2004 Summer Olympics. His final appearance on an international event came in 2007, when he was part of the team that finished the World Championship in the ninth position.
