= Gergely Harsányi =

Hungarian handball player (born 1981)

Personal information
- Full name: Gergely János Harsányi
- Nationality: Hungarian
- Born: 3 May 1981 (age 45) Nyíregyháza, Hungary
- Height: 1.91 m (6 ft 3 in)

Sport
- Sport: Handball
- Position: Right Wing
- Current club: Retired

Senior clubs
- Years: Team
- –1999: Nyíregyházi KC
- 1999–2007: PLER KC
- 2007–2008: Frisch Auf Göppingen
- 2008–2009: PLER KC
- 2009: Ferencvárosi TC
- 2010–2018: Grundfos Tatabánya KC
- 2018–2020: Tatai AC
- 2020–2022: Komárom VSE
National team
Years	Team	Apps	(Gls)
2002–2017	Hungary	179	(399)

Gergely János Harsányi (born 3 May 1981) is a Hungarian handballer, who retired from professional handball in 2018 and currently plays for Tatai AC in the Hungarian second division.

== Career ==
Harsányi started his professional career at his hometown club Nyíregyházi KC, before moving to PLER KC. He spent a decade with the Pestszentlőrinc-based team and captured a Hungarian Cup bronze in 2007. In the 2007–2008 season, he played handball in the German Bundesliga, Frisch Auf Göppingen, and then returned to PLER KC after 1 season. He signed to Ferencvárosi TC in the summer of 2009, however, after financial difficulties with the club were revealed, Harsányi was transferred to Tatabánya-Carbonex KC in the winter break to ease the growing troubles at the club. He retired from professional handball in 2018.

His first major international tournament was the 2004 Summer Olympics, where the Hungarian team placed fourth. He participated on two European Championship (2006, 2012), four World Championships (2009, 2011, 2013, 2017) and two Olympics (2004 and 2012).

== Achievements ==
- Nemzeti Bajnokság I:
  - Bronze Medallist: 2010, 2015, 2016, 2017, 2018
- Magyar Kupa:
  - Bronze Medallist: 2007

== Individual awards ==
- Golden Cross of the Cross of Merit of the Republic of Hungary (2012)
