= Árpád Pál =

Hungarian handball player (born 1955)

Árpád Pál (born 15 February 1955 in Miskolc) is a former Hungarian handball player who competed in the 1980 Summer Olympics.

In 1980, Pál was part of the Hungarian team which finished fourth in the Olympic tournament. He played all six matches and scored two goals.
