= Mohsen Babasafari =

Iranian handball player (born 1987)

Personal information
- Full name: Mohsen Babasafari Renani
- Nationality: Iranian
- Born: 28 June 1987 (age 39) Khomeini Shahr, Iran
- Height: 1.98 m (6 ft 6 in)

Sport
- Sport: Handball
- Position: Goalkeeper
- Current club: HC Buzău
- Number: 16
National team
Years	Team	Apps	(Gls)
2004–2020	Iran	138	(0)

Mohsen Babasafari (Persian: محسن باباصفری, born 28 June 1987) is an Iranian handball player for HC Buzău and the Captain of Iranian national team.

== Career ==
Babasafari was one of the players selected to play in the World Handball Championship for Iran in 2015, the only time thus far when Iran had qualified for it. On 29 December 2015, he and his team beat Ukraine at the Christmas Cup, eventually winning 25–21.
