= Ferenc Füzesi =

Hungarian handball player (1960–2020)

Ferenc Füzesi (1 July 1960 – 6 April 2020) was a Hungarian handball player, born in Nagyatád. He played for the Hungarian national handball team, and participated at the 1992 Summer Olympics, where Hungary placed 7th after beating Romania in the final match.
