= 2019–20 Balatonfüredi KSE season =

Balatonfüredi KSE
2019–20 season
- Chairman: László Csima
- Manager: István Csoknyai
Home colours	Away colours

The 2019–20 season will be Balatonfüredi KSE's 13th competitive and consecutive season in the Nemzeti Bajnokság I and 29th year in existence as a handball club.

== Players ==
=== Squad information ===
Goalkeepers

- 1 (Hungary) Nándor Fazekas
- 12 (Hungary) Dániel Bősz
- 21 (Hungary) Adrián Andó

Left Wingers

- 7 (Hungary) Bendegúz Bóka
- 30 (Hungary) Bálint Ág

Right Wingers

- 8 (Hungary) Bence Déber
- 26 (Spain) Pedro Rodríguez

Line players

- 3 (Hungary) László Kemény
- 19 (Serbia) Darko Stevanović
- 22 (Croatia) Petar Topić

Left Backs

- 6 (Hungary) Márton Varga
- 16 (Hungary) Barnabás Orbán
- 28 (Belarus) Aliaksei Shynkel
- 92 (Hungary) Bence Zdolik

Central Backs

- 10 (Hungary) Balázs Németh
- 14 (Hungary) Balázs Szöllősi

Right Backs

- 11 (Spain) Luis Felipe Jiménez
- 91 (Hungary) Péter Határ
- 99 (Hungary) Dominik Máthé

=== Transfers ===
Source: hetmeteres.hu

In:

- (Spain) Luis Felipe Jiménez (from (Greece) Olympiacos)
- (Spain) Pedro Rodríguez (from Szeged)
- (Serbia) Darko Stevanović (from (Serbia) Partizan)
- (Belarus) Aliaksei Shynkel (from (Ukraine) Motor Zaporozhye)

Out:

- (Brazil) Uelington Ferreira (to (France) Saran Loiret)
- Péter Hornyák (to Balatonfüred)
- (Slovakia) Ottó Kancel (to Orosháza)
- Alex Németh (to Vác)
- (Russia) Yury Semenov (to (Finland) Riihimäki Cocks)
- Zoltán Szita (loan to Veszprém)
- Olivér Szőlősi (to Mezőkövesd)

== Club ==
=== Technical Staff ===
Position	Staff member
President	(Hungary) László Csima
Head coach	(Hungary) István Csoknyai
Assistant coaches	(Ukraine) (Hungary) Igor Zubjuk
Goalkeeping coach	(Hungary) János Szathmári
Team doctor	(Hungary) Dr. József Csordás
Masseur	(Hungary) Richárd Rácz
Physiotherapist	(Hungary) Tamás Szabó

Source: Coaches

=== Uniform ===
- Supplier: Erima
- Main sponsor: tippmix / Sennebogen / 77 Elektronika / Takarékbank / City of Balatonfüred / Volkswagen
- Back sponsor: Oriens
- Shorts sponsor: Bradimpex Kft

== Competitions ==
=== Overview ===
Win Draw Loss

Competition	First match	Last match	Starting round	Final position	Record							
Competition	First match	Last match	Starting round	Final position	Pld	W	D	L	GF	GA	GD	Win %
Nemzeti Bajnokság I	25 August 2019	4 March 2020	Matchday 5	no title awarded	18	10	1	7	525	496	+29	55.56
Magyar Kupa	10 December 2019	14 February 2020	Fourth round	no title awarded	2	2	0	0	75	47	+28	100.00
EHF Cup	17 November 2019	23 November 2019	Third qualifying round	Third qualifying round	2	1	0	1	51	56	−5	50.00
Total					22	13	1	8	651	599	+52	59.09

Last updated: 28 December 2019
Source: Competitions

=== Nemzeti Bajnokság I ===
==== Results by round ====
Match	1	2	3	4	5	6	7	8	9	10	11	12	13	14	15	16	17	18	19	20	21	22	23	24	25	26
Ground	A	A	H	A	H	H	A	H	A	H	A	H	A	H	A	H	A	H	A	H	A	H	A	H	A	H
Result	L	W	W	D	W	W	L	L	W	L	W	W	L	W	L	W	W	L	C	C	C	C	C	C	C	C

Updated to match(es) played on 5 February 2020. Source: Matches
A = Away; H = Home; W = Win; D = Draw; L = Loss; C = Cancelled

The matches follow a chronological order.

==== Matches ====
Round 1; 31 August 2019; 18:00	Budakalász FKC	23–25	Balatonfüredi KSE	Municipal Sports Hall, Budakalász; Attendance: 220; Referees: Paska, Vastag
Round 1; 31 August 2019; 18:00	Koller 6	(10–10)	Máthé 10	Municipal Sports Hall, Budakalász; Attendance: 220; Referees: Paska, Vastag
Round 1; 31 August 2019; 18:00	3× (yellow card) 4× (suspension)	Report	2× (yellow card) 8× (suspension) 1× (red card)	Municipal Sports Hall, Budakalász; Attendance: 220; Referees: Paska, Vastag

Round 2; 7 September 2019; 18:30	Balatonfüredi KSE	26–24	HE-DO B. Braun Gyöngyös	Leisure Centre, Balatonfüred; Attendance: 600; Referees: Bíró, Kiss
Round 2; 7 September 2019; 18:30	Topić 7	(15–11)	Varsandán, Hegedűs 4	Leisure Centre, Balatonfüred; Attendance: 600; Referees: Bíró, Kiss
Round 2; 7 September 2019; 18:30	5× (suspension)	Report	1× (yellow card) 5× (suspension)	Leisure Centre, Balatonfüred; Attendance: 600; Referees: Bíró, Kiss

Round 3; 14 September 2019; 18:00	Dabas VSE KC	27–27	Balatonfüredi KSE	OBO Aréna, Dabas; Attendance: 1,000; Referees: Sándor, Szikszay
Round 3; 14 September 2019; 18:00	Perišić 7	(15–13)	Bóka 6	OBO Aréna, Dabas; Attendance: 1,000; Referees: Sándor, Szikszay
Round 3; 14 September 2019; 18:00	3× (yellow card) 6× (suspension)	Report	2× (yellow card) 4× (suspension)	OBO Aréna, Dabas; Attendance: 1,000; Referees: Sándor, Szikszay

Round 4; 28 September 2019; 18:00	Balatonfüredi KSE	32–25	SBS-Eger	Leisure Centre, Balatonfüred; Attendance: 500; Referees: Hargitai, Markó
Round 4; 28 September 2019; 18:00	Máthé 5	(16–13)	Füzi 7	Leisure Centre, Balatonfüred; Attendance: 500; Referees: Hargitai, Markó
Round 4; 28 September 2019; 18:00	2× (yellow card) 5× (suspension)	Report	2× (yellow card) 8× (suspension)	Leisure Centre, Balatonfüred; Attendance: 500; Referees: Hargitai, Markó

Round 5; 25 August 2019; 18:00	Telekom Veszprém	40–28	Balatonfüredi KSE	Veszprém Aréna, Veszprém; Attendance: 2,859; Referees: Horváth, Marton
Round 5; 25 August 2019; 18:00	Borozan 7	(23–16)	Topić, Máthé 5	Veszprém Aréna, Veszprém; Attendance: 2,859; Referees: Horváth, Marton
Round 5; 25 August 2019; 18:00	2× (yellow card) 5× (suspension)	Report	1× (yellow card) 5× (suspension)	Veszprém Aréna, Veszprém; Attendance: 2,859; Referees: Horváth, Marton

Round 6; 11 October 2019; 18:00	Balatonfüredi KSE	29–25	FTC-HungaroControl	Leisure Centre, Balatonfüred; Attendance: 800; Referees: Medve, Südi
Round 6; 11 October 2019; 18:00	Rodríguez 7	(15–11)	Nagy 7	Leisure Centre, Balatonfüred; Attendance: 800; Referees: Medve, Südi
Round 6; 11 October 2019; 18:00	1× (yellow card) 3× (suspension)	Report	1× (yellow card) 7× (suspension)	Leisure Centre, Balatonfüred; Attendance: 800; Referees: Medve, Südi

Round 7; 16 October 2019; 18:00	MOL-Pick Szeged	41–22	Balatonfüredi KSE	Municipal Sports Hall, Szeged; Attendance: 2,000; Referees: Nagy, Túróczy
Round 7; 16 October 2019; 18:00	Šoštarič 12	(21–11)	Kemény 6	Municipal Sports Hall, Szeged; Attendance: 2,000; Referees: Nagy, Túróczy
Round 7; 16 October 2019; 18:00	3× (yellow card) 2× (suspension)	Report	3× (yellow card) 2× (suspension)	Municipal Sports Hall, Szeged; Attendance: 2,000; Referees: Nagy, Túróczy

Round 8; 2 November 2019; 18:00	Balatonfüredi KSE	25–30	Sport36-Komló	Leisure Centre, Balatonfüred; Attendance: 700; Referees: Altmár, Horváth
Round 8; 2 November 2019; 18:00	Topić 7	(11–15)	Sunajko, Jerković 6	Leisure Centre, Balatonfüred; Attendance: 700; Referees: Altmár, Horváth
Round 8; 2 November 2019; 18:00	3× (suspension)	Report	1× (yellow card) 3× (suspension)	Leisure Centre, Balatonfüred; Attendance: 700; Referees: Altmár, Horváth

Round 9; 8 November 2019; 18:00	Váci KSE	21–36	Balatonfüredi KSE	Municipal Sports Hall, Vác; Attendance: 400; Referees: Fekete, Tóth
Round 9; 8 November 2019; 18:00	Davidović, Bognár 4	(11–17)	Zdolik 5	Municipal Sports Hall, Vác; Attendance: 400; Referees: Fekete, Tóth
Round 9; 8 November 2019; 18:00	6× (suspension)	Report	2× (yellow card) 2× (suspension)	Municipal Sports Hall, Vác; Attendance: 400; Referees: Fekete, Tóth

Round 10; 13 November 2019; 18:00	Balatonfüredi KSE	24–26	Grundfos Tatabánya KC	Leisure Centre, Balatonfüred; Attendance: 1,000; Referees: Andorka, Hucker
Round 10; 13 November 2019; 18:00	Szöllősi 7	(14–13)	Balogh 7	Leisure Centre, Balatonfüred; Attendance: 1,000; Referees: Andorka, Hucker
Round 10; 13 November 2019; 18:00	1× (yellow card) 2× (suspension)	Report	2× (yellow card) 2× (suspension) 1× (red card)	Leisure Centre, Balatonfüred; Attendance: 1,000; Referees: Andorka, Hucker

Round 11; 30 November 2019; 18:00	Mezőkövesdi KC	22–31	Balatonfüredi KSE	Municipal Sports Hall, Mezőkövesd; Attendance: 420; Referees: Bócz, Wiedemann
Round 11; 30 November 2019; 18:00	Kovács 6	(10–13)	Máthé 6	Municipal Sports Hall, Mezőkövesd; Attendance: 420; Referees: Bócz, Wiedemann
Round 11; 30 November 2019; 18:00	2× (yellow card) 5× (suspension) 1× (red card)	Report	1× (yellow card) 3× (suspension)	Municipal Sports Hall, Mezőkövesd; Attendance: 420; Referees: Bócz, Wiedemann

Round 12; 6 December 2019; 18:00	Balatonfüredi KSE	37–29	Orosházi FKSE- LINAMAR	Leisure Centre, Balatonfüred; Attendance: 500; Referees: Paska, Vastag
Round 12; 6 December 2019; 18:00	Rodríguez 7	(19–12)	Orjonikidze 7	Leisure Centre, Balatonfüred; Attendance: 500; Referees: Paska, Vastag
Round 12; 6 December 2019; 18:00	2× (suspension)	Report	1× (yellow card) 8× (suspension) 1× (red card)	Leisure Centre, Balatonfüred; Attendance: 500; Referees: Paska, Vastag

Round 13; 14 December 2019; 18:00	Csurgói KK	26–25	Balatonfüredi KSE	László Sótonyi Sports Hall, Csurgó; Attendance: 1,000; Referees: Hargitai, Markó
Round 13; 14 December 2019; 18:00	Leimeter 5	(12–13)	Szöllősi, Topić 6	László Sótonyi Sports Hall, Csurgó; Attendance: 1,000; Referees: Hargitai, Markó
Round 13; 14 December 2019; 18:00	2× (yellow card) 4× (suspension) 1× (red card)	Report	2× (yellow card) 5× (suspension)	László Sótonyi Sports Hall, Csurgó; Attendance: 1,000; Referees: Hargitai, Markó

Round 14; 31 January 2020; 18:00	Balatonfüredi KSE	29–22	Budakalász FKC	Leisure Centre, Balatonfüred; Attendance: 600; Referees: Nagy, Túróczy
Round 14; 31 January 2020; 18:00	Jiménez, Szöllősi 6	(12–10)	Gábor 6	Leisure Centre, Balatonfüred; Attendance: 600; Referees: Nagy, Túróczy
Round 14; 31 January 2020; 18:00	2× (yellow card) 2× (suspension)	Report	2× (yellow card) 5× (suspension)	Leisure Centre, Balatonfüred; Attendance: 600; Referees: Nagy, Túróczy

Round 15; 8 February 2020; 15:00	HE-DO B. Braun Gyöngyös	31–28	Balatonfüredi KSE	Dr. András Fejes Sports Hall, Gyöngyös; Attendance: 1,100; Referees: Paska, Vastag
Round 15; 8 February 2020; 15:00	Markez 9	(16–9)	Máthé 9	Dr. András Fejes Sports Hall, Gyöngyös; Attendance: 1,100; Referees: Paska, Vastag
Round 15; 8 February 2020; 15:00	3× (yellow card) 5× (suspension) 1× (red card)	Report	2× (suspension)	Dr. András Fejes Sports Hall, Gyöngyös; Attendance: 1,100; Referees: Paska, Vastag

Round 16; 22 February 2020; 18:00	Balatonfüredi KSE	34–22	Dabas VSE KC	Leisure Centre, Balatonfüred; Attendance: 600; Referees: Bócz, Wiedemann
Round 16; 22 February 2020; 18:00	B. Szöllősi 6	(18–11)	Kurucz, Sz. Szöllősi 4	Leisure Centre, Balatonfüred; Attendance: 600; Referees: Bócz, Wiedemann
Round 16; 22 February 2020; 18:00	1× (yellow card) 3× (suspension)	Report	5× (suspension)	Leisure Centre, Balatonfüred; Attendance: 600; Referees: Bócz, Wiedemann

Round 17; 29 February 2020; 18:00	SBS-Eger	29–37	Balatonfüredi KSE	Ferenc Kemény Sports Hall, Eger; Attendance: 800; Referees: Nagy, Túróczy
Round 17; 29 February 2020; 18:00	Füzi 7	(16–18)	Topić, Máthé 8	Ferenc Kemény Sports Hall, Eger; Attendance: 800; Referees: Nagy, Túróczy
Round 17; 29 February 2020; 18:00	1× (yellow card) 5× (suspension) 1× (red card)	Report	2× (yellow card) 2× (suspension)	Ferenc Kemény Sports Hall, Eger; Attendance: 800; Referees: Nagy, Túróczy

Round 18; 4 March 2020; 18:00	Balatonfüredi KSE	30–33	Telekom Veszprém	Leisure Centre, Balatonfüred; Attendance: 1,000; Referees: Andorka, Hucker
Round 18; 4 March 2020; 18:00	Topić 11	(15–15)	Nenadić 6	Leisure Centre, Balatonfüred; Attendance: 1,000; Referees: Andorka, Hucker
Round 18; 4 March 2020; 18:00	1× (yellow card) 4× (suspension)	Report	2× (yellow card) 3× (suspension)	Leisure Centre, Balatonfüred; Attendance: 1,000; Referees: Andorka, Hucker

Round 19	FTC-HungaroControl	Cancalled	Balatonfüredi KSE	Elek Gyula Aréna, Budapest

Round 20	Balatonfüredi KSE	Cancalled	MOL-Pick Szeged	Leisure Centre, Balatonfüred

Round 21	Sport36-Komló	Cancalled	Balatonfüredi KSE	Municipal Sports Center, Komló

Round 22	Balatonfüredi KSE	Cancalled	Váci KSE	Leisure Centre, Balatonfüred

Round 23	Orosházi FKSE- LINAMAR	Cancalled	Balatonfüredi KSE	Municipal Sports Center, Orosháza

Round 24	Balatonfüredi KSE	Cancalled	Mezőkövesdi KC	Leisure Centre, Balatonfüred

Round 25	Grundfos Tatabánya KC	Cancalled	Balatonfüredi KSE	Imre Földi Sports Hall, Tatabánya

Round 26	Balatonfüredi KSE	Cancalled	Csurgói KK	Leisure Centre, Balatonfüred

==== Results overview ====
Opposition	Home score	Away score	Double
Budakalász FKC	29–22	23–25	54-45
Csurgói KK	~~9 May~~	26–25	-
Dabas VSE KC	34–22	27–27	61-49
SBS-Eger	32–25	29–37	69-54
FTC-HungaroControl	29–25	~~14 Mar~~	-
HE-DO B. Braun Gyöngyös	26–24	31–28	54-55
Sport36-Komló	25–30	~~28 Mar~~	-
Mezőkövesdi KC	~~25 Apr~~	22–31	-
Orosházi FKSE- LINAMAR	37–29	~~11 Apr~~	-
MOL-Pick Szeged	~~17 Mar~~	41–22	-
Grundfos Tatabánya KC	24–26	~~2 May~~	-
Váci KSE	~~4 Apr~~	21–36	-
Telekom Veszprém	30–33	40–28	58-73

=== Hungarian Cup ===
==== Matches ====
4th round 10 December 2019; 18:00	Balatonfüredi KSE	37–23	SBS Eger	Leisure Centre, Balatonfüred; Attendance: 300; Referees: Bíró, Kiss
4th round 10 December 2019; 18:00	Topić 8	(16–11)	Tóth 6	Leisure Centre, Balatonfüred; Attendance: 300; Referees: Bíró, Kiss
4th round 10 December 2019; 18:00	2× (yellow card) 3× (suspension)	Report	4× (suspension)	Leisure Centre, Balatonfüred; Attendance: 300; Referees: Bíró, Kiss

5th round 14 February 2020; 18:00	Balatonfüredi KSE	38–24	Mezőkövesdi KC	Leisure Centre, Balatonfüred; Attendance: 400; Referees: Paska, Vastag
5th round 14 February 2020; 18:00	Topić 6	(19–12)	Radnić 5	Leisure Centre, Balatonfüred; Attendance: 400; Referees: Paska, Vastag
5th round 14 February 2020; 18:00	4× (suspension)	Report	1× (yellow card) 5× (suspension)	Leisure Centre, Balatonfüred; Attendance: 400; Referees: Paska, Vastag

Cancelled due to the COVID-19 pandemic.

=== EHF Cup ===
==== Third qualifying round ====
17 November 2019; 13:00	Balatonfüredi KSE	30–27	(Spain) Abanca Ademar León	Leisure Centre, Balatonfüred; Attendance: 600; Referees: Covalciuc, Covalciuc (MDA)
17 November 2019; 13:00	Topić 7	(15–13)	Fernández 8	Leisure Centre, Balatonfüred; Attendance: 600; Referees: Covalciuc, Covalciuc (MDA)
17 November 2019; 13:00	3× (yellow card) 3× (suspension)	Report	1× (yellow card)	Leisure Centre, Balatonfüred; Attendance: 600; Referees: Covalciuc, Covalciuc (MDA)

23 November 2019; 19:30	Abanca Ademar León (Spain)	29–21	Balatonfüredi KSE	Palacio Municipal, León; Attendance: 4,200; Referees: Pandžić, Mosorinski (SRB)
23 November 2019; 19:30	Lučin 8	(14–9)	Topić 8	Palacio Municipal, León; Attendance: 4,200; Referees: Pandžić, Mosorinski (SRB)
23 November 2019; 19:30	2× (yellow card)	Report	3× (yellow card) 2× (suspension)	Palacio Municipal, León; Attendance: 4,200; Referees: Pandžić, Mosorinski (SRB)

Balatonfüredi KSE lost, 51–56 on aggregate.

== Statistics ==
=== Top scorers ===
Includes all competitive matches. The list is sorted by shirt number when total goals are equal.

Last updated on 31 January 2020

Position	Nation	No.	Name	Hungarian League	Hungarian Cup	Champions League	SEHA League	Total

=== Attendances ===
List of the home matches:

Round	Against	Attadance	Capatility	Date
NB I- 2.	HE-DO B. Braun Gyöngyös	600	64,8%	September 7, 2019
NB I- 4.	SBS-Eger	500	54,0%	September 28, 2019
NB I- 6.	FTC-HungaroControl	800	86,4%	October 11, 2019
NB I- 8.	Sport36-Komló	700	75,6%	November 2, 2019
NB I- 10.	Grundfos Tatabánya KC	1,000	100,0%	November 13, 2019
EHF-QR3	Abanca Ademar León (Spain)	600	64,8%	November 17, 2019
NB I- 12.	Orosházi FKSE- LINAMAR	500	54,0%	December 6, 2019
MK- 4th	SBS-Eger	300	32,4%	December 10, 2020
NB I- 14.	Budakalász FKC	600	64,8%	January 31, 2020
MK- 5th	Mezőkövesdi KC	400	43,2%	February 14, 2020
NB I- 16.	Dabas VSE KC	600	64,8%	February 22, 2020
NB I- 18.	Telekom Veszprém	1,000	100,0%	March 4, 2020
NB I- 20.	MOL-Pick Szeged		%	March 17, 2020
