= 2019–20 Tatabánya KC season =

Tatabánya KC
2019–20 season
- Chairman: László Marosi
- Manager: Vladan Matić
Home colours	Away colours

The 2019–20 season will be Tatabánya KC's 48th competitive and consecutive season in the Nemzeti Bajnokság I and 77th year in existence as a handball club.

== Players ==
=== Squad information ===
Goalkeepers

- 1 (Hungary) Xavér Deményi
- 16 (Hungary) László Bartucz
- 21 (Hungary) Ádám Borbély

Left Wingers

- 6 (Montenegro) Miloš Vujović
- 40 (Hungary) Bence Ernei

Right Wingers

- 4 (Hungary) Ákos Pásztor
- 47 (Hungary) Péter Hornyák

Line players

- 8 (Hungary) Adrián Sipos
- 20 (Romania) András Szász
- 24 (Hungary) János Dénes (c)
- 77 (Bosnia and Herzegovina) Vladimir Vranjes

Left Backs

- 9 (Hungary) Bence Bálint
- 18 (Hungary) Ferenc Ilyés
- 34 (Russia) Vitaly Komogorov

Central Backs

- 7 (Hungary) Ádám Juhász
- 13 (Hungary) Uroš Borzaš
- 22 (Hungary) Mátyás Győri

Right Backs

- 19 (Hungary) Zsolt Balogh
- 27 (Hungary) Gábor Ancsin

=== Transfers ===
Source: hetmeteres.hu

In:

- Gábor Ancsin (loan from Veszprém)
- Zsolt Balogh (from Szeged)
- Ádám Borbély (from (Poland) Wisła Płock)
- Bence Ernei (from Veszprém U23)
- Péter Hornyák (from Balatonfüred)
- (Russia) Vitaly Komogorov (from (Romania) Dinamo București)
- (Romania) András Szász (from (Romania) Dinamo București)

Out:

- Dániel Fekete (to ETO-SZESE)
- (Romania) Demis Grigoraș (to (France) Chambéry)
- Kristóf Győri (loan to Ferencváros)
- Bence Nagy (to Ferencváros)
- Miklós Rosta (to Szeged)
- Kevin Rozner (to Vác)
- Zsolt Schäffer (to Ferencváros)
- Márton Székely (to Veszprém)
- (Croatia) Jakov Vranković (to (Romania) Dinamo București)

== Club ==
=== Technical Staff ===
Position	Staff member
President	(Hungary) László Marosi
CEO	(Hungary) Sándor Zoltán Németh
Technical Director	(Hungary) Zsolt Kontra
Head coach	(Serbia) (Hungary) Vladan Matić
Assistant coaches	(Hungary) Jakab Sibalin
Goalkeeping coach	(Hungary) Péter Nagy
Team doctor	(Hungary) Dr. Zoltán Csőkör
Masseur	(Hungary) Jenő Flasch
Masseur	(Hungary) Gyula Kovács
Physiotherapist	(Hungary) Róbert Radnai
Physiotherapist	(Hungary) Mónika Kemény
Conditioning coach	(Hungary) András Szabó

Source: Coaches, Staff

=== Uniform ===
- Supplier: Jako
- Main sponsor: tippmix / Tatabánya Erőmű Kft / City of Tatabánya
- Back sponsor: Grundfos
- Shorts sponsor: Bridgestone / rb

== Competitions ==
=== Overview ===
Win Draw Loss

Competition	First match	Last match	Starting round	Final position	Record							
Competition	First match	Last match	Starting round	Final position	Pld	W	D	L	GF	GA	GD	Win %
Nemzeti Bajnokság I	31 August 2019	13 March 2020	Matchday 1	no title awarded	19	12	0	7	545	503	+42	63.16
Magyar Kupa	10 December 2019	3 February 2020	Fourth round	Fifth round	2	0	1	1	39	49	−10	0.00
EHF Cup	17 November 2019	-	Third qualifying round	-	10	8	1	1	297	251	+46	80.00
Total					31	20	2	9	881	803	+78	64.52

Last updated: 21 May 2020
Source: Competitions

=== Nemzeti Bajnokság I ===
==== Results by round ====
Match	1	2	3	4	5	6	7	8	9	10	11	12	13	14	15	16	17	18	19	20	21	22	23	24	25	26
Ground	A	A	A	H	A	H	A	A	H	A	H	A	H	H	H	A	H	H	A	H	H	A	H	A	H	A
Result	W	L	L	L	W	W	L	W	W	W	W	W	W	W	L	L	W	L	W	C	C	C	C	C	C	C

Updated to match(es) played on 5 February 2020. Source: Matches
A = Away; H = Home; W = Win; D = Draw; L = Loss; C = Cancelled

The matches follow a chronological order.

==== Matches ====
Round 1; 31 August 2019; 18:00	SBS-Eger	28–30	Grundfos Tatabánya KC	Ferenc Kemény Sports Hall, Eger; Attendance: 700; Referees: Fekete, Tóth
Round 1; 31 August 2019; 18:00	Lezák 8	(17–15)	Božović, Balogh 7	Ferenc Kemény Sports Hall, Eger; Attendance: 700; Referees: Fekete, Tóth
Round 1; 31 August 2019; 18:00	2× (yellow card) 3× (suspension)	Report	2× (yellow card) 5× (suspension)	Ferenc Kemény Sports Hall, Eger; Attendance: 700; Referees: Fekete, Tóth

Round 2; 10 September 2019; 18:00	Telekom Veszprém	33–22	Grundfos Tatabánya KC	Veszprém Aréna, Veszprém; Attendance: 2,876; Referees: Andorka, Hucker
Round 2; 10 September 2019; 18:00	Mahé 7	(15–10)	Győri 5	Veszprém Aréna, Veszprém; Attendance: 2,876; Referees: Andorka, Hucker
Round 2; 10 September 2019; 18:00	1× (yellow card) 3× (suspension)	Report	3× (yellow card) 5× (suspension)	Veszprém Aréna, Veszprém; Attendance: 2,876; Referees: Andorka, Hucker

Round 3; 14 September 2019; 18:00	FTC-HungaroControl	32–31	Grundfos Tatabánya KC	Elek Gyula Aréna, Budapest; Attendance: 400; Referees: Bócz, Wiedemann
Round 3; 14 September 2019; 18:00	Nagy 10	(18–17)	Vujović 10	Elek Gyula Aréna, Budapest; Attendance: 400; Referees: Bócz, Wiedemann
Round 3; 14 September 2019; 18:00	2× (yellow card) 6× (suspension)	Report	2× (yellow card) 6× (suspension)	Elek Gyula Aréna, Budapest; Attendance: 400; Referees: Bócz, Wiedemann

Round 4; 25 September 2019; 17:00	Grundfos Tatabánya KC	28–34	MOL-Pick Szeged	Imre Földi Sports Hall, Tatabánya; Attendance: 1,200; Referees: Hargitai, Markó
Round 4; 25 September 2019; 17:00	Ancsin 9	(13–18)	Radivojević 7	Imre Földi Sports Hall, Tatabánya; Attendance: 1,200; Referees: Hargitai, Markó
Round 4; 25 September 2019; 17:00	3× (yellow card) 3× (suspension) 2× (red card)	Report	1× (yellow card) 7× (suspension) 1× (red card)	Imre Földi Sports Hall, Tatabánya; Attendance: 1,200; Referees: Hargitai, Markó

Round 5; 5 October 2019; 18:00	Sport36-Komló	20–24	Grundfos Tatabánya KC	Municipal Sports Center, Komló; Attendance: 700; Referees: Nagy, Túróczy
Round 5; 5 October 2019; 18:00	Marković 5	(14–13)	Vujović 9	Municipal Sports Center, Komló; Attendance: 700; Referees: Nagy, Túróczy
Round 5; 5 October 2019; 18:00	3× (yellow card) 7× (suspension)	Report	2× (yellow card) 7× (suspension)	Municipal Sports Center, Komló; Attendance: 700; Referees: Nagy, Túróczy

Round 6; 10 October 2019; 18:00	Grundfos Tatabánya KC	37–18	Váci KSE	Imre Földi Sports Hall, Tatabánya; Attendance: 800; Referees: Medve, Südi
Round 6; 10 October 2019; 18:00	Vujović, Győri 5	(19–11)	Bognár 6	Imre Földi Sports Hall, Tatabánya; Attendance: 800; Referees: Medve, Südi
Round 6; 10 October 2019; 18:00	2× (yellow card) 3× (suspension)	Report	2× (yellow card) 4× (suspension) 1× (red card)	Imre Földi Sports Hall, Tatabánya; Attendance: 800; Referees: Medve, Südi

Round 7; 19 October 2019; 18:00	Csurgói KK	28–23	Grundfos Tatabánya KC	László Sótonyi Sports Hall, Csurgó; Attendance: 1,000; Referees: Hargitai, Markó
Round 7; 19 October 2019; 18:00	Vasić 8	(12–10)	Vranješ 5	László Sótonyi Sports Hall, Csurgó; Attendance: 1,000; Referees: Hargitai, Markó
Round 7; 19 October 2019; 18:00	3× (yellow card) 6× (suspension)	Report	1× (yellow card) 5× (suspension) 1× (red card)	László Sótonyi Sports Hall, Csurgó; Attendance: 1,000; Referees: Hargitai, Markó

Round 8; 2 November 2019; 18:00	Mezőkövesdi KC	26–34	Grundfos Tatabánya KC	Municipal Sports Hall, Mezőkövesd; Attendance: 800; Referees: Bíró, Kiss
Round 8; 2 November 2019; 18:00	Kovács, Menyhárt 6	(18–17)	Balogh 11	Municipal Sports Hall, Mezőkövesd; Attendance: 800; Referees: Bíró, Kiss
Round 8; 2 November 2019; 18:00	1× (yellow card) 2× (suspension)	Report	1× (yellow card) 1× (suspension)	Municipal Sports Hall, Mezőkövesd; Attendance: 800; Referees: Bíró, Kiss

Round 9; 10 November 2019; 18:00	Grundfos Tatabánya KC	23–17	Orosházi FKSE- LINAMAR	Imre Földi Sports Hall, Tatabánya; Attendance: 800; Referees: Bujdosó, Horváth
Round 9; 10 November 2019; 18:00	Szász 5	(12–12)	Mršulja 6	Imre Földi Sports Hall, Tatabánya; Attendance: 800; Referees: Bujdosó, Horváth
Round 9; 10 November 2019; 18:00	2× (yellow card) 2× (suspension)	Report	2× (yellow card) 5× (suspension) 1× (red card)	Imre Földi Sports Hall, Tatabánya; Attendance: 800; Referees: Bujdosó, Horváth

Round 10; 13 November 2019; 18:00	Balatonfüredi KSE	24–26	Grundfos Tatabánya KC	Leisure Centre, Balatonfüred; Attendance: 1,000; Referees: Andorka, Hucker
Round 10; 13 November 2019; 18:00	Szöllősi 7	(14–13)	Balogh 7	Leisure Centre, Balatonfüred; Attendance: 1,000; Referees: Andorka, Hucker
Round 10; 13 November 2019; 18:00	1× (yellow card) 2× (suspension)	Report	2× (yellow card) 2× (suspension) 1× (red card)	Leisure Centre, Balatonfüred; Attendance: 1,000; Referees: Andorka, Hucker

Round 11; 30 November 2019; 18:00	Grundfos Tatabánya KC	34–23	Budakalász FKC	Imre Földi Sports Hall, Tatabánya; Attendance: 900; Referees: Nagy, Túróczy
Round 11; 30 November 2019; 18:00	Vujović 7	(15–7)	Török 6	Imre Földi Sports Hall, Tatabánya; Attendance: 900; Referees: Nagy, Túróczy
Round 11; 30 November 2019; 18:00	2× (yellow card) 4× (suspension)	Report	3× (yellow card) 2× (suspension)	Imre Földi Sports Hall, Tatabánya; Attendance: 900; Referees: Nagy, Túróczy

Round 12; 7 December 2019; 18:00	HE-DO B. Braun Gyöngyös	29–31	Grundfos Tatabánya KC	Dr. András Fejes Sports Hall, Gyöngyös; Attendance: 1,300; Referees: Horváth, Marton
Round 12; 7 December 2019; 18:00	Vilovski 8	(14–11)	Vujović, Győri 7	Dr. András Fejes Sports Hall, Gyöngyös; Attendance: 1,300; Referees: Horváth, Marton
Round 12; 7 December 2019; 18:00	2× (yellow card) 4× (suspension)	Report	2× (yellow card) 7× (suspension)	Dr. András Fejes Sports Hall, Gyöngyös; Attendance: 1,300; Referees: Horváth, Marton

Round 13; 15 December 2019; 18:00	Grundfos Tatabánya KC	28–19	Dabas VSE KC	Imre Földi Sports Hall, Tatabánya; Attendance: 1,000; Referees: Felhő, Öcsi
Round 13; 15 December 2019; 18:00	Vujović 7	(19–11)	Halász, Zakics 4	Imre Földi Sports Hall, Tatabánya; Attendance: 1,000; Referees: Felhő, Öcsi
Round 13; 15 December 2019; 18:00	3× (yellow card) 2× (suspension)	Report	2× (yellow card) 3× (suspension)	Imre Földi Sports Hall, Tatabánya; Attendance: 1,000; Referees: Felhő, Öcsi

Round 14; 30 January 2020; 18:00	Grundfos Tatabánya KC	36–29	SBS-Eger	Imre Földi Sports Hall, Tatabánya; Attendance: 700; Referees: Hargitai, Markó
Round 14; 30 January 2020; 18:00	Győri 7	(17–16)	three players 6	Imre Földi Sports Hall, Tatabánya; Attendance: 700; Referees: Hargitai, Markó
Round 14; 30 January 2020; 18:00	3× (yellow card) 4× (suspension)	Report	2× (yellow card) 3× (suspension)	Imre Földi Sports Hall, Tatabánya; Attendance: 700; Referees: Hargitai, Markó

Round 15; 10 March 2020; 18:00	Grundfos Tatabánya KC	26–33	Telekom Veszprém	Imre Földi Sports Hall, Tatabánya; Attendance: 1,200; Referees: Hargitai, Markó
Round 15; 10 March 2020; 18:00	Győri 5	(13–18)	Štrlek 8	Imre Földi Sports Hall, Tatabánya; Attendance: 1,200; Referees: Hargitai, Markó
Round 15; 10 March 2020; 18:00	2× (yellow card) 2× (suspension)	Report	3× (yellow card) 2× (suspension)	Imre Földi Sports Hall, Tatabánya; Attendance: 1,200; Referees: Hargitai, Markó

Round 16; 18 February 2020; 18:00	Grundfos Tatabánya KC	24–28	FTC-HungaroControl	Imre Földi Sports Hall, Tatabánya; Attendance: 1,000; Referees: Andorka, Hucker
Round 16; 18 February 2020; 18:00	Borzaš, Balogh 4	(11–11)	Anđelić 11	Imre Földi Sports Hall, Tatabánya; Attendance: 1,000; Referees: Andorka, Hucker
Round 16; 18 February 2020; 18:00	3× (yellow card) 3× (suspension)	Report	1× (yellow card) 1× (suspension)	Imre Földi Sports Hall, Tatabánya; Attendance: 1,000; Referees: Andorka, Hucker

Round 17; 25 February 2020; 18:30	MOL-Pick Szeged	36–25	Grundfos Tatabánya KC	Municipal Sports Hall, Szeged; Attendance: 3,000; Referees: Medve, Südi
Round 17; 25 February 2020; 18:30	Cañellas 9	(18–12)	Ancsin 6	Municipal Sports Hall, Szeged; Attendance: 3,000; Referees: Medve, Südi
Round 17; 25 February 2020; 18:30	2× (yellow card) 2× (suspension)	Report	2× (yellow card) 4× (suspension) 1× (red card)	Municipal Sports Hall, Szeged; Attendance: 3,000; Referees: Medve, Südi

Round 18; 6 March 2020; 18:00	Grundfos Tatabánya KC	29–22	Sport36-Komló	Imre Földi Sports Hall, Tatabánya; Attendance: 800; Referees: Paska, Vastag
Round 18; 6 March 2020; 18:00	Balogh, Hornyák 5	(14–10)	Jerković 5	Imre Földi Sports Hall, Tatabánya; Attendance: 800; Referees: Paska, Vastag
Round 18; 6 March 2020; 18:00	2× (yellow card) 9× (suspension) 1× (red card)	Report	3× (yellow card) 8× (suspension)	Imre Földi Sports Hall, Tatabánya; Attendance: 800; Referees: Paska, Vastag

Round 19; 13 March 2020; 18:30	Váci KSE	24–34	Grundfos Tatabánya KC	Municipal Sports Hall, Vác; Referees: Fekete, Tóth
Round 19; 13 March 2020; 18:30	Kozina 6	(13–19)	Ancsin 6	Municipal Sports Hall, Vác; Referees: Fekete, Tóth
Round 19; 13 March 2020; 18:30	2× (yellow card) 3× (suspension)	Report	1× (yellow card) 4× (suspension) 1× (red card)	Municipal Sports Hall, Vác; Referees: Fekete, Tóth

Round 20	Grundfos Tatabánya KC	Cancelled	Csurgói KK	Imre Földi Sports Hall, Tatabánya

Round 21	Grundfos Tatabánya KC	Cancelled	Mezőkövesdi KC	Imre Földi Sports Hall, Tatabánya

Round 22	Orosházi FKSE- LINAMAR	Cancelled	Grundfos Tatabánya KC	Municipal Sports Hall, Orosháza

Round 23	Grundfos Tatabánya KC	Cancelled	HE-DO B. Braun Gyöngyös	Imre Földi Sports Hall, Tatabánya

Round 24	Budakalász FKC	Cancelled	Grundfos Tatabánya KC	Municipal Sports Hall, Budakalász

Round 25	Grundfos Tatabánya KC	Cancelled	Balatonfüredi KSE	Imre Földi Sports Hall, Tatabánya

Round 26	Dabas VSE KC	Cancelled	Grundfos Tatabánya KC	OBO Aréna, Dabas

==== Results overview ====
Opposition	Home score	Away score	Double
Balatonfüredi KSE	~~2 May~~	24–26	-
Budakalász FKC	34–23	~~25 Apr~~	-
Csurgói KK	~~17 Mar~~	28–23	-
Dabas VSE KC	28–19	~~9 May~~	-
SBS-Eger	36–29	28–30	66-57
FTC-HungaroControl	24–28	32–31	55-60
HE-DO B. Braun Gyöngyös	~~10 Apr~~	29–31	-
Sport36-Komló	29–22	20–24	53-42
Mezőkövesdi KC	~~25 Mar~~	26–34	-
Orosházi FKSE- LINAMAR	23–17	~~4 Apr~~	-
MOL-Pick Szeged	28–34	36–25	53-70
Váci KSE	37–18	24–34	71-42
Telekom Veszprém	26–33	33–22	48-66

=== Hungarian Cup ===
==== Matches ====
4th round 10 December 2019; 19:00	Orosházi FKSE- LINAMAR	23–23 (a)	Grundfos Tatabánya KC	Municipal Sports Hall, Orosháza; Attendance: 250; Referees: Bócz, Wiedemann
4th round 10 December 2019; 19:00	Németh 6	(10–10)	Balogh 6	Municipal Sports Hall, Orosháza; Attendance: 250; Referees: Bócz, Wiedemann
4th round 10 December 2019; 19:00	2× (suspension)	Report	2× (yellow card) 2× (suspension)	Municipal Sports Hall, Orosháza; Attendance: 250; Referees: Bócz, Wiedemann

5th round 3 February 2020; 18:00	Grundfos Tatabánya KC	16–26	Telekom Veszprém	Imre Földi Sports Hall, Tatabánya; Attendance: 1,200; Referees: Bócz, Wiedemann
5th round 3 February 2020; 18:00	Balogh 4	(9–14)	Gajić 5	Imre Földi Sports Hall, Tatabánya; Attendance: 1,200; Referees: Bócz, Wiedemann
5th round 3 February 2020; 18:00	1× (yellow card) 3× (suspension)	Report	2× (yellow card) 6× (suspension)	Imre Földi Sports Hall, Tatabánya; Attendance: 1,200; Referees: Bócz, Wiedemann

=== EHF Cup ===
==== Third qualifying round ====
17 November 2019; 15:00	Grundfos Tatabanya KC	27–24	(Ukraine) ZTR Zaporizhia	Imre Földi Sports Hall, Tatabánya; Attendance: 850; Referees: Sekulić, Jovandić (SRB)
17 November 2019; 15:00	Vujović 7	(13–12)	Title 6	Imre Földi Sports Hall, Tatabánya; Attendance: 850; Referees: Sekulić, Jovandić (SRB)
17 November 2019; 15:00	1× (yellow card) 3× (suspension)	Report	1× (yellow card) 4× (suspension)	Imre Földi Sports Hall, Tatabánya; Attendance: 850; Referees: Sekulić, Jovandić (SRB)

23 November 2019; 18:00 (19:00 EET)	ZTR Zaporizhia (Ukraine)	27–26	Grundfos Tatabanya KC	Yunost Sport Hall, Zaporizhia; Attendance: 1,000; Referees: Di Domenico, Fornasier (ITA)
23 November 2019; 18:00 (19:00 EET)	Akimenko 6	(10–12)	Komogorov 9	Yunost Sport Hall, Zaporizhia; Attendance: 1,000; Referees: Di Domenico, Fornasier (ITA)
23 November 2019; 18:00 (19:00 EET)	3× (yellow card) 5× (suspension)	Report	1× (yellow card) 3× (suspension)	Yunost Sport Hall, Zaporizhia; Attendance: 1,000; Referees: Di Domenico, Fornasier (ITA)

Grundfos Tatabanya KC won, 53–51 on aggregate.

==== Group stage ====
Pos	Team	Pld	W	D	L	GF	GA	GD	Pts	Qualification	FUC	PAU	TAT	LOG
1	(Germany) Füchse Berlin	4	2	1	1	110	102	+8	5	Knockout stage	—	Cancelled	27–27	33–26
2	(France) PAUC Handball	4	1	2	1	102	100	+2	4	Ranking of the second-placed teams	23–25	—	26–22	Cancelled
3	(Hungary) Grundfos Tatabánya KC	4	1	2	1	99	102	−3	4	Eliminated	Cancelled	24–24	—	26–25
4	(Spain) BM Logroño La Rioja	4	1	1	2	106	113	−7	3	Eliminated	26–25	29–29	Cancelled	—

Updated to match(es) played on 1 March 2020. Source: EHF
Rules for classification: Tiebreakers

===== Matches =====
8 February 2020; 12:00	Grundfos Tatabánya KC	26–25	(Spain) BM Logroño La Rioja	Audi Aréna, Győr (Note: Grundfos Tatabánya KC played their home EHF Cup matches (from the Group stage) at Audi Aréna, Győr, instead of their regular hall Imre Földi Sports Hall, Tatabánya.); Attendance: 2,500; Referees: Christiansen, Hansen (DEN)
8 February 2020; 12:00	Ancsin 6	(15–11)	Hackbarth 5	Audi Aréna, Győr; Attendance: 2,500; Referees: Christiansen, Hansen (DEN)
8 February 2020; 12:00	1× (yellow card) 3× (suspension)	Report	1× (yellow card) 2× (suspension)	Audi Aréna, Győr; Attendance: 2,500; Referees: Christiansen, Hansen (DEN)

13 February 2020; 19:00	Füchse Berlin (Germany)	27–27	Grundfos Tatabánya KC	Max-Schmeling-Halle, Berlin; Attendance: 5,919; Referees: Ben-Dan, Faran (ISR)
13 February 2020; 19:00	Holm 6	(15–17)	Borzaš 9	Max-Schmeling-Halle, Berlin; Attendance: 5,919; Referees: Ben-Dan, Faran (ISR)
13 February 2020; 19:00	3× (yellow card) 2× (suspension)	Report	1× (yellow card) 7× (suspension)	Max-Schmeling-Halle, Berlin; Attendance: 5,919; Referees: Ben-Dan, Faran (ISR)

22 February 2020; 17:00	Grundfos Tatabánya KC	24–24	(France) PAUC Handball	Audi Aréna, Győr; Attendance: 2,700; Referees: Jović, Arnautović (BIH)
22 February 2020; 17:00	Ancsin 6	(11–15)	Leoz 5	Audi Aréna, Győr; Attendance: 2,700; Referees: Jović, Arnautović (BIH)
22 February 2020; 17:00	2× (yellow card) 2× (suspension)	Report	2× (yellow card) 3× (suspension)	Audi Aréna, Győr; Attendance: 2,700; Referees: Jović, Arnautović (BIH)

1 March 2020; 19:00	PAUC Handball (France)	26–22	Grundfos Tatabánya KC	Aréna du Pays d'Aix, Aix-en-Provence; Attendance: 1,400; Referees: Ershov, Pavliukov (RUS)
1 March 2020; 19:00	Leoz 5	(14–8)	Hornyák, Komogorov 4	Aréna du Pays d'Aix, Aix-en-Provence; Attendance: 1,400; Referees: Ershov, Pavliukov (RUS)
1 March 2020; 19:00	3× (yellow card) 4× (suspension)	Report	2× (yellow card) 4× (suspension)	Aréna du Pays d'Aix, Aix-en-Provence; Attendance: 1,400; Referees: Ershov, Pavliukov (RUS)

===== Results overview =====
Opposition	Home score	Away score	Double
(France) PAUC Handball	24–24	26–22	46-50
(Germany) Füchse Berlin	29 Mar	27–27	-
(Spain) BM Logroño La Rioja	26–25	21 Mar	-

== Statistics ==
=== Top scorers ===
Includes all competitive matches. The list is sorted by shirt number when total goals are equal.

Last updated on 31 January 2020

Position	Nation	No.	Name	Hungarian League	Hungarian Cup	Champions League	SEHA League	Total

=== Attendances ===
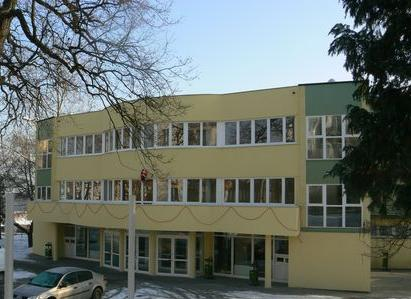
Home hall: Imre Földi Sports Hall

List of the home matches:

Round	Against	Attadance	Capatility	Date
NB I- 4.	MOL-Pick Szeged	1,200	96,0%	September 25, 2019
NB I- 6.	Váci KSE	800	64,0%	October 10, 2019
NB I- 9.	Orosházi FKSE- LINAMAR	800	64,0%	November 10, 2019
EHF-QR3	ZTR Zaporizhia (Ukraine)	850	86,9%	November 17, 2019
NB I- 11.	Budakalász FKC	900	72,0%	November 30, 2019
NB I- 13.	Dabas VSE KC	1,000	80,0%	December 15, 2019
NB I- 14.	SBS-Eger	700	56,0%	January 30, 2020
MK- 5th	Telekom Veszprém	1,200	96,0%	February 3, 2020
EHF-(GS) 1.	BM Logroño La Rioja (Spain)	2,500	45,5%	February 8, 2020
NB I- 16.	FTC-HungaroControl	1,000	80,0%	February 18, 2020
EHF-(GS) 3.	PAUC Handball (France)	2,700	49,1%	February 22, 2020
NB I- 18.	Sport36-Komló	800	64,0%	March 6, 2020
EHF-(GS) 6.	Füchse Berlin (Germany)		%	March 29, 2020
