= 2019–20 SC Pick Szeged season =

SC Pick Szeged
2019–20 season
- Chairman: Dr. Ernő Péter Szűcs
- Manager: (Spain) Juan Carlos Pastor
- NB 1: no title awarded
- Hungarian Cup: no title awarded
- EHF Champions League: cancalled
Home colours	Away colours

The 2019–20 season will be SC Pick Szeged's 44th competitive and consecutive season in the Nemzeti Bajnokság I and 58th year in existence as a handball club.

== Players ==
=== Squad information ===
Goalkeepers

- 16 (Hungary) Roland Mikler
- 32 (Croatia) Mirko Alilović
- 52 (Hungary) Martin Nagy

Left Wingers

- 8 (Sweden) Jonas Källman (c)
- 10 (Iceland) Stefán Rafn Sigurmannsson

Right Wingers

- 17 (Serbia) Bogdan Radivojević
- 24 (Slovenia) Mario Šoštarič

Line players

- 22 (Slovenia) Matej Gaber
- 27 (Hungary) Bence Bánhidi
- 45 (Hungary) Miklós Rosta

Left Backs

- 9 (Hungary) Richárd Bodó
- 15 (Slovenia) Nik Henigman
- 21 (Croatia) Alen Blažević

Central Backs

- 14 (Spain) Joan Cañellas
- 44 (Slovenia) Dean Bombač
- 89 (Russia) Dmitry Zhitnikov

Right Backs

- 5 (Spain) Jorge Maqueda
- 7 (Croatia) Luka Stepančić
- 37 (Czech Republic) Stanislav Kašpárek

=== Transfers ===
Source: hetmeteres.hu

In:

- Bálint Fekete (loan from (Spain) Logroño)
- Roland Mikler (from Veszprém)
- (Serbia) Bogdan Radivojević (from (Germany) Rhein-Neckar Löwen)
- Miklós Rosta (from Tatabánya)
- (Croatia) Luka Stepančić (from (France) Paris Saint-Germain)

Out:

- Zsolt Balogh (to Tatabánya)
- Bálint Fekete (loan to (Spain) Cuenca)
- (Spain) Pedro Rodríguez (to Balatonfüred)
- (Serbia) Stefan Sunajko (loan to (Sweden) Sävehof)
- (Croatia) Marin Šego (to (France) Montpellier)

== Club ==
=== Technical Staff ===
Position	Staff member
President	(Hungary) Dr. Ernő Péter Szűcs
Head coach Technical Director	(Spain) Juan Carlos Pastor
Assistant coach	(Serbia) (Hungary) Marko Krivokapić
Goalkeeping coach	(Serbia) Nenad Damjanović
Team doctor	(Hungary) Dr. István Szabó
Massage Therapist	(Serbia) Đorđe Ignjatović
Massage Therapist	(Hungary) Tamás Molnár
Conditioning coach	(Hungary) Kornél Bubori

Source: Coaches, Staff

=== Uniform ===
- Supplier: Adidas
- Main sponsor: MOL / Pick / tippmix / OTP Bank / City of Szeged
- Back sponsor: Lexus Szeged
- Shorts sponsor: Groupama / Konica Minolta / Csányi Foundation

== Competitions ==
=== Overview ===
Win Draw Loss

Competition	First match	Last match	Starting round	Final position	Record							
Competition	First match	Last match	Starting round	Final position	Pld	W	D	L	GF	GA	GD	Win %
Nemzeti Bajnokság I	31 August 2019	6 March 2020	Matchday 1	no title awarded	20	19	0	1	733	248	+485	95.00
Magyar Kupa	11 March 2020	11 March 2020	Fifth round	no title awarded	1	1	0	0	43	29	+14	100.00
EHF Champions League	14 September 2019	29 February 2020	Group stage	cancalled	10	8	1	1	297	251	+46	80.00
Total					31	28	1	2	1,073	528	+545	90.32

Last updated: 21 May 2020
Source: Competitions

=== Nemzeti Bajnokság I ===
==== League table ====
Pos	Team	Pld	W	D	L	GF	GA	GD	Pts	Qualification or relegation
1	MOL-Pick Szeged	20	19	0	1	733	485	+248	38	
2	Telekom Veszprém	18	18	0	0	653	451	+202	36	
3	HE-DO B. Braun Gyöngyös	17	11	1	5	512	468	+44	23	
4	FTC-HungaroControl	18	11	1	6	518	484	+34	23	
5	Grundfos Tatabánya KC	17	11	0	6	485	446	+39	22	
6	Balatonfüredi KSE	18	10	1	7	525	496	+29	21	
7	Csurgói KK	18	9	1	8	450	457	−7	19	
8	Sport36-Komló	18	8	2	8	470	478	−8	18	
9	Dabasi KC VSE	18	6	1	11	459	527	−68	13	
10	SBS-Eger	17	5	2	10	457	522	−65	12	
11	Orosházi FKSE - Linamar	18	4	2	12	451	520	−69	10	
12	Mezőkövesdi KC	18	2	5	11	451	552	−101	9	Relegation to Nemzeti Bajnokság I/B
13	Budakalász Kézilabda ZRT	19	2	1	16	468	565	−97	5	
14	VKSE KFT Vác	18	1	1	16	417	598	−181	3	Relegation to Nemzeti Bajnokság I/B

Updated to match(es) played on October 2020. Source: mksz.hu
Rules for classification: 1) Points; 2) Goal difference; 3) Head-to-head points; 4) Head-to-head goal difference; 5) Goals scored; 6) Matches won; 7) Draw (Note: Head-to-head record is used only after all the matches between the teams in question have been played)

==== Results by round ====
Match	1	2	3	4	5	6	7	8	9	10	11	12	13	14	15	16	17	18	19	20	21	22	23	24	25	26
Ground	H	H	H	A	A	H	A	H	H	H	A	H	A	H	A	A	H	A	H	A	H	A	A	A	H	A
Result	W	W	W	W	W	W	W	W	W	W	W	W	L	W	W	W	W	W	W	W	C	C	C	C	C	C

Updated to match(es) played on 5 February 2020. Source: Matches
A = Away; H = Home; W = Win; D = Draw; L = Loss; C = Cancelled

The matches follow a chronological order.

==== Matches ====
Round 1; 31 August 2019; 18:00	MOL-Pick Szeged	29–21	Csurgói KK	Municipal Sports Hall, Szeged; Attendance: 2,000; Referees: Nagy, Túróczy
Round 1; 31 August 2019; 18:00	Radivojević 9	(14–11)	Leimeter, Kerkovits 4	Municipal Sports Hall, Szeged; Attendance: 2,000; Referees: Nagy, Túróczy
Round 1; 31 August 2019; 18:00	2× (yellow card) 3× (suspension)	Report	2× (yellow card) 3× (suspension)	Municipal Sports Hall, Szeged; Attendance: 2,000; Referees: Nagy, Túróczy

Round 2; 6 September 2019; 18:00	MOL-Pick Szeged	37–21	Sport36-Komló	Municipal Sports Hall, Szeged; Attendance: 1,500; Referees: Réti, Szedmák
Round 2; 6 September 2019; 18:00	Šoštarič 7	(19–13)	Marković 4	Municipal Sports Hall, Szeged; Attendance: 1,500; Referees: Réti, Szedmák
Round 2; 6 September 2019; 18:00	1× (yellow card) 4× (suspension)	Report	1× (yellow card) 4× (suspension)	Municipal Sports Hall, Szeged; Attendance: 1,500; Referees: Réti, Szedmák

Round 3; 10 September 2019; 18:00	MOL-Pick Szeged	39–23	Váci KSE	Municipal Sports Hall, Szeged; Attendance: 1,000; Referees: Bujdosó, Horváth
Round 3; 10 September 2019; 18:00	Bodó, Radivojević 6	(18–9)	Rozner 4	Municipal Sports Hall, Szeged; Attendance: 1,000; Referees: Bujdosó, Horváth
Round 3; 10 September 2019; 18:00	1× (yellow card) 4× (suspension)	Report	1× (yellow card) 4× (suspension)	Municipal Sports Hall, Szeged; Attendance: 1,000; Referees: Bujdosó, Horváth

Round 4; 25 September 2019; 17:00	Grundfos Tatabánya KC	28–34	MOL-Pick Szeged	Imre Földi Sports Hall, Tatabánya; Attendance: 1,200; Referees: Hargitai, Markó
Round 4; 25 September 2019; 17:00	Ancsin 9	(13–18)	Radivojević 7	Imre Földi Sports Hall, Tatabánya; Attendance: 1,200; Referees: Hargitai, Markó
Round 4; 25 September 2019; 17:00	3× (yellow card) 3× (suspension) 2× (red card)	Report	1× (yellow card) 7× (suspension) 1× (red card)	Imre Földi Sports Hall, Tatabánya; Attendance: 1,200; Referees: Hargitai, Markó

Round 5; 5 October 2019; 18:00	MOL-Pick Szeged	40–19	Mezőkövesdi KC	Municipal Sports Hall, Szeged; Attendance: 1,500; Referees: Medve, Südi
Round 5; 5 October 2019; 18:00	Šoštarič 14	(19–6)	Stanković 4	Municipal Sports Hall, Szeged; Attendance: 1,500; Referees: Medve, Südi
Round 5; 5 October 2019; 18:00	2× (yellow card)	Report	8× (suspension) 1× (red card)	Municipal Sports Hall, Szeged; Attendance: 1,500; Referees: Medve, Südi

Round 6; 8 October 2019; 18:00	Orosházi FKSE- LINAMAR	30–42	MOL-Pick Szeged	Municipal Sports Hall, Orosháza; Attendance: 340; Referees: Réti, Szedmák
Round 6; 8 October 2019; 18:00	Lele 10	(16–23)	Gaber, Šoštarič 6	Municipal Sports Hall, Orosháza; Attendance: 340; Referees: Réti, Szedmák
Round 6; 8 October 2019; 18:00	2× (suspension)	Report	1× (yellow card) 2× (suspension)	Municipal Sports Hall, Orosháza; Attendance: 340; Referees: Réti, Szedmák

Round 7; 16 October 2019; 18:00	MOL-Pick Szeged	41–22	Balatonfüredi KSE	Municipal Sports Hall, Szeged; Attendance: 2,000; Referees: Nagy, Túróczy
Round 7; 16 October 2019; 18:00	Šoštarič 12	(21–11)	Kemény 6	Municipal Sports Hall, Szeged; Attendance: 2,000; Referees: Nagy, Túróczy
Round 7; 16 October 2019; 18:00	3× (yellow card) 2× (suspension)	Report	3× (yellow card) 2× (suspension)	Municipal Sports Hall, Szeged; Attendance: 2,000; Referees: Nagy, Túróczy

Round 8; 17 September 2019; 18:00	Budakalász FKC	27–33	MOL-Pick Szeged	Municipal Sports Hall, Budakalász; Attendance: 220; Referees: Földesi, Halász
Round 8; 17 September 2019; 18:00	Török 6	(18–16)	Radivojević 8	Municipal Sports Hall, Budakalász; Attendance: 220; Referees: Földesi, Halász
Round 8; 17 September 2019; 18:00	3× (yellow card) 4× (suspension)	Report	2× (yellow card) 5× (suspension) 1× (red card)	Municipal Sports Hall, Budakalász; Attendance: 220; Referees: Földesi, Halász

Round 9; 5 November 2019; 18:30	MOL-Pick Szeged	31–28	HE-DO B. Braun Gyöngyös	Municipal Sports Hall, Szeged; Attendance: 1,200; Referees: Rontó, Szanyi
Round 9; 5 November 2019; 18:30	Šoštarič 9	(15–19)	Herceg 7	Municipal Sports Hall, Szeged; Attendance: 1,200; Referees: Rontó, Szanyi
Round 9; 5 November 2019; 18:30	1× (yellow card) 4× (suspension)	Report	2× (yellow card) 6× (suspension)	Municipal Sports Hall, Szeged; Attendance: 1,200; Referees: Rontó, Szanyi

Round 10; 19 November 2019; 18:00	Dabas VSE KC	22–40	MOL-Pick Szeged	OBO Aréna, Dabas; Attendance: 1,200; Referees: Bujdosó, Horváth
Round 10; 19 November 2019; 18:00	Borsos 6	(10–20)	Radivojević 8	OBO Aréna, Dabas; Attendance: 1,200; Referees: Bujdosó, Horváth
Round 10; 19 November 2019; 18:00	5× (suspension)	Report	3× (yellow card) 2× (suspension)	OBO Aréna, Dabas; Attendance: 1,200; Referees: Bujdosó, Horváth

Round 11; 26 November 2019; 18:00	MOL-Pick Szeged	45–32	SBS-Eger	Municipal Sports Hall, Szeged; Attendance: 1,600; Referees: Fekete, Tóth
Round 11; 26 November 2019; 18:00	Šoštarič 10	(23–14)	Füzi 7	Municipal Sports Hall, Szeged; Attendance: 1,600; Referees: Fekete, Tóth
Round 11; 26 November 2019; 18:00	2× (yellow card) 2× (suspension)	Report	1× (suspension)	Municipal Sports Hall, Szeged; Attendance: 1,600; Referees: Fekete, Tóth

Round 12; 7 December 2019; 19:30	Telekom Veszprém	29–28	MOL-Pick Szeged	Veszprém Aréna, Veszprém; Attendance: 5,156; Referees: Hargitai, Markó
Round 12; 7 December 2019; 19:30	Štrlek, Nenadić 7	(15–15)	Cañellas, Radivojević 6	Veszprém Aréna, Veszprém; Attendance: 5,156; Referees: Hargitai, Markó
Round 12; 7 December 2019; 19:30	1× (yellow card) 2× (suspension)	Report	2× (yellow card) 6× (suspension)	Veszprém Aréna, Veszprém; Attendance: 5,156; Referees: Hargitai, Markó

Round 13; 13 December 2019; 16:00	MOL-Pick Szeged	38–25	FTC-HungaroControl	Municipal Sports Hall, Szeged; Attendance: 2,000; Referees: Medve, Südi
Round 13; 13 December 2019; 16:00	Šoštarič 7	(23–12)	Nagy 7	Municipal Sports Hall, Szeged; Attendance: 2,000; Referees: Medve, Südi
Round 13; 13 December 2019; 16:00	1× (yellow card) 5× (suspension)	Report	2× (yellow card) 5× (suspension)	Municipal Sports Hall, Szeged; Attendance: 2,000; Referees: Medve, Südi

Round 14; 2 February 2020; 18:00	Csurgói KK	23–26	MOL-Pick Szeged	László Sótonyi Sports Hall, Csurgó; Attendance: 1,000; Referees: Altmár, Horváth
Round 14; 2 February 2020; 18:00	Hanusz, Szeitl 5	(11–13)	Sigurmannsson 7	László Sótonyi Sports Hall, Csurgó; Attendance: 1,000; Referees: Altmár, Horváth
Round 14; 2 February 2020; 18:00	2× (yellow card) 7× (suspension) 1× (red card)	Report	1× (yellow card) 7× (suspension)	László Sótonyi Sports Hall, Csurgó; Attendance: 1,000; Referees: Altmár, Horváth

Round 15; 4 February 2020; 18:00	Sport36-Komló	23–33	MOL-Pick Szeged	Municipal Sports Center, Komló; Attendance: 700; Referees: Felhő, Öcsi
Round 15; 4 February 2020; 18:00	Marković 6	(12–18)	Stepančić, Bombač 7	Municipal Sports Center, Komló; Attendance: 700; Referees: Felhő, Öcsi
Round 15; 4 February 2020; 18:00	2× (yellow card) 5× (suspension)	Report	3× (yellow card) 5× (suspension)	Municipal Sports Center, Komló; Attendance: 700; Referees: Felhő, Öcsi

Round 16; 22 February 2020; 18:30	Váci KSE	28–46	MOL-Pick Szeged	Municipal Sports Hall, Vác; Attendance: 620; Referees: Földesi, Halász
Round 16; 22 February 2020; 18:30	Kozina 9	(17–26)	Šoštarič, Rosta 6	Municipal Sports Hall, Vác; Attendance: 620; Referees: Földesi, Halász
Round 16; 22 February 2020; 18:30	3× (yellow card) 2× (suspension)	Report	2× (yellow card) 7× (suspension)	Municipal Sports Hall, Vác; Attendance: 620; Referees: Földesi, Halász

Round 17; 25 February 2020; 18:30	MOL-Pick Szeged	36–25	Grundfos Tatabánya KC	Municipal Sports Hall, Szeged; Attendance: 3,000; Referees: Medve, Südi
Round 17; 25 February 2020; 18:30	Cañellas 9	(18–12)	Ancsin 6	Municipal Sports Hall, Szeged; Attendance: 3,000; Referees: Medve, Südi
Round 17; 25 February 2020; 18:30	2× (yellow card) 2× (suspension)	Report	2× (yellow card) 4× (suspension) 1× (red card)	Municipal Sports Hall, Szeged; Attendance: 3,000; Referees: Medve, Südi

Round 18; 6 March 2020; 18:00	Mezőkövesdi KC	26–39	MOL-Pick Szeged	Municipal Sports Hall, Mezőkövesd; Attendance: 520; Referees: Fekete, Tóth
Round 18; 6 March 2020; 18:00	Halilbegović 5	(12–20)	Radivojević, Šoštarič 6	Municipal Sports Hall, Mezőkövesd; Attendance: 520; Referees: Fekete, Tóth
Round 18; 6 March 2020; 18:00	2× (yellow card) 1× (suspension)	Report	1× (yellow card) 2× (suspension)	Municipal Sports Hall, Mezőkövesd; Attendance: 520; Referees: Fekete, Tóth

Round 19	MOL-Pick Szeged	Cancalled	Orosházi FKSE- LINAMAR	Municipal Sports Hall, Szeged

Round 20	Balatonfüredi KSE	Cancalled	MOL-Pick Szeged	Leisure Centre, Balatonfüred

Round 21; 11 February 2020; 18:00	MOL-Pick Szeged	41–17	Budakalász FKC	Municipal Sports Hall, Szeged; Attendance: 1,000; Referees: Rontó, Szanyi
Round 21; 11 February 2020; 18:00	Šoštarič 12	(20–8)	Váczi, Nemes 3	Municipal Sports Hall, Szeged; Attendance: 1,000; Referees: Rontó, Szanyi
Round 21; 11 February 2020; 18:00	1× (yellow card) 5× (suspension)	Report	1× (yellow card) 3× (suspension)	Municipal Sports Hall, Szeged; Attendance: 1,000; Referees: Rontó, Szanyi

Round 22	HE-DO B. Braun Gyöngyös	Cancalled	MOL-Pick Szeged	Dr. András Fejes Sports Hall, Gyöngyös

Round 23	MOL-Pick Szeged	Cancalled	Telekom Veszprém	Municipal Sports Hall, Szeged

Round 24	SBS-Eger	Cancalled	MOL-Pick Szeged	Ferenc Kemény Sports Hall, Eger

Round 25; 12 November 2019; 18:00	MOL-Pick Szeged	35–16	Dabas VSE KC	Municipal Sports Hall, Szeged; Attendance: 1,000; Referees: Földesi, Halász
Round 25; 12 November 2019; 18:00	Šoštarič 5	(16–8)	Halász 5	Municipal Sports Hall, Szeged; Attendance: 1,000; Referees: Földesi, Halász
Round 25; 12 November 2019; 18:00	3× (yellow card) 2× (suspension)	Report	2× (yellow card) 3× (suspension)	Municipal Sports Hall, Szeged; Attendance: 1,000; Referees: Földesi, Halász

Round 26	FTC-HungaroControl	Cancalled	MOL-Pick Szeged	Elek Gyula Aréna, Budapest

==== Results overview ====
Opposition	Home score	Away score	Double
Balatonfüredi KSE	41–22	~~17 Mar~~	-
Budakalász FKC	41–17	27–33	74-44
Csurgói KK	29–21	23–26	55-44
Dabas VSE KC	35–16	22–40	75-38
SBS-Eger	45–32	~~3 Apr~~	-
FTC-HungaroControl	38–25	~~9 May~~	-
HE-DO B. Braun Gyöngyös	31–28	~~4 Apr~~	-
Sport36-Komló	37–21	23–33	70-44
Mezőkövesdi KC	40–19	26–39	79-45
Orosházi FKSE- LINAMAR	~~14 Mar~~	30–42	-
Grundfos Tatabánya KC	36–25	28–34	70-53
Váci KSE	39–23	28–46	85-51
Telekom Veszprém	~~11 Apr~~	29–28	-

=== Hungarian Cup ===
==== Matches ====
5th round 11 March 2020; 18:00	MOL-Pick Szeged	43–29	FTC-HungaroControl	Municipal Sports Hall, Szeged; Referees: Bujdosó, Horváth
5th round 11 March 2020; 18:00	Radivojević, Kašpárek 7	(23–13)	Nagy 7	Municipal Sports Hall, Szeged; Referees: Bujdosó, Horváth
5th round 11 March 2020; 18:00	2× (yellow card) 4× (suspension)	Report	1× (yellow card) 4× (suspension)	Municipal Sports Hall, Szeged; Referees: Bujdosó, Horváth

Cancelled due to the COVID-19 pandemic.

=== EHF Champions League ===
==== Group stage ====
Pos	Team	Pld	W	D	L	GF	GA	GD	Pts	Qualification	BAR	PAR	SZE	ALB	FLE	CEL	ZAG	ELV
1	(Spain) Barça	14	13	0	1	485	380	+105	26	Quarterfinals	—	36–32	30–28	44–35	31–27	45–21	32–23	33–24
2	(France) Paris Saint-Germain	14	11	0	3	444	389	+55	22	First knockout round	32–35	—	30–25	37–24	32–30	27–18	37–26	31–25
3	(Hungary) MOL-Pick Szeged	14	9	2	3	409	370	+39	20	First knockout round	31–28	32–29	—	26–26	24–24	31–24	33–23	32–25
4	(Denmark) Aalborg Håndbold	14	7	1	6	416	420	−4	15 (Note: Aalborg Håndbold 63–57 SG Flensburg-Handewitt)	First knockout round	30–34	29–32	28–35	—	31–28	28–24	30–20	30–28
5	(Germany) SG Flensburg-Handewitt	14	7	1	6	388	379	+9	15	First knockout round	27–34	29–30	34–26	29–32	—	29–26	20–17	26–19
6	(Slovenia) Celje Pivovarna Laško	14	3	0	11	355	429	−74	6	First knockout round	25–37	29–33	23–34	28–29	24–25	—	24–22	32–25
7	(Croatia) PPD Zagreb	14	2	1	11	343	419	−76	5		19–36	29–37	21–26	31–30	25–26	27–31	—	30–27
8	(Norway) Elverum Håndball	14	1	1	12	365	419	−54	3		26–30	22–25	25–26	24–34	28–34	37–26	30–30	—

Source: EHF
Rules for classification: Tiebreakers

===== Matches =====
14 September 2019; 17:30	MOL-Pick Szeged	31–28	(Spain) Barça	Municipal Sports Hall, Szeged; Attendance: 3,200; Referees: Elíasson, Pálsson (ISL)
14 September 2019; 17:30	Maqueda 7	(18–11)	Fabregas 8	Municipal Sports Hall, Szeged; Attendance: 3,200; Referees: Elíasson, Pálsson (ISL)
14 September 2019; 17:30	2× (yellow card) 3× (suspension)	Report	2× (yellow card) 2× (suspension)	Municipal Sports Hall, Szeged; Attendance: 3,200; Referees: Elíasson, Pálsson (ISL)

22 September 2019; 19:00	Paris Saint-Germain (France)	30–25	MOL-Pick Szeged	Stade Pierre de Coubertin, Paris; Attendance: 1,800; Referees: Nikolov, Nachevski (MKD)
22 September 2019; 19:00	N. Karabatić 8	(16–14)	Maqueda 6	Stade Pierre de Coubertin, Paris; Attendance: 1,800; Referees: Nikolov, Nachevski (MKD)
22 September 2019; 19:00	2× (yellow card) 4× (suspension)	Report	2× (yellow card) 3× (suspension)	Stade Pierre de Coubertin, Paris; Attendance: 1,800; Referees: Nikolov, Nachevski (MKD)

28 September 2019; 17:30	MOL-Pick Szeged	24–24	(Germany) SG Flensburg-Handewitt	Municipal Sports Hall, Szeged; Attendance: 3,200; Referees: Brunovský, Čanda (SVK)
28 September 2019; 17:30	Radivojević 11	(12–12)	Johannessen 9	Municipal Sports Hall, Szeged; Attendance: 3,200; Referees: Brunovský, Čanda (SVK)
28 September 2019; 17:30	1× (yellow card) 1× (suspension)	Report	2× (yellow card)	Municipal Sports Hall, Szeged; Attendance: 3,200; Referees: Brunovský, Čanda (SVK)

13 October 2019; 16:50	Aalborg Håndbold (Denmark)	28–35	MOL-Pick Szeged	Jutlander Bank Arena, Aalborg; Attendance: 4,382; Referees: Santos, Fonseca (POR)
13 October 2019; 16:50	Møllgaard 7	(17–22)	Bánhidi 11	Jutlander Bank Arena, Aalborg; Attendance: 4,382; Referees: Santos, Fonseca (POR)
13 October 2019; 16:50	2× (yellow card) 3× (suspension)	Report	4× (suspension)	Jutlander Bank Arena, Aalborg; Attendance: 4,382; Referees: Santos, Fonseca (POR)

20 October 2019; 17:00	PPD Zagreb (Croatia)	21–26	MOL-Pick Szeged	Arena Zagreb, Zagreb; Attendance: 3,721; Referees: Zotin, Volodkov (RUS)
20 October 2019; 17:00	Šipić 6	(10–15)	Maqueda, Šoštarič 5	Arena Zagreb, Zagreb; Attendance: 3,721; Referees: Zotin, Volodkov (RUS)
20 October 2019; 17:00	3× (yellow card) 9× (suspension) 1× (red card)	Report	3× (yellow card) 6× (suspension) 1× (red card)	Arena Zagreb, Zagreb; Attendance: 3,721; Referees: Zotin, Volodkov (RUS)

3 November 2019; 17:00	MOL-Pick Szeged	31–24	(Slovenia) Celje Pivovarna Laško	Municipal Sports Hall, Szeged; Attendance: 3,200; Referees: Bonaventura, Bonaventura (FRA)
3 November 2019; 17:00	Radivojević 8	(14–14)	Šarac 7	Municipal Sports Hall, Szeged; Attendance: 3,200; Referees: Bonaventura, Bonaventura (FRA)
3 November 2019; 17:00	1× (yellow card)	Report	2× (yellow card) 3× (suspension)	Municipal Sports Hall, Szeged; Attendance: 3,200; Referees: Bonaventura, Bonaventura (FRA)

10 November 2019; 17:00	MOL-Pick Szeged	32–25	(Norway) Elverum Håndball	Municipal Sports Hall, Szeged; Attendance: 3,200; Referees: Sondors, Līcis (LAT)
10 November 2019; 17:00	Zhitnikov 5	(15–13)	Blonz 8	Municipal Sports Hall, Szeged; Attendance: 3,200; Referees: Sondors, Līcis (LAT)
10 November 2019; 17:00	1× (yellow card) 6× (suspension) 1× (red card)	Report	2× (yellow card) 5× (suspension)	Municipal Sports Hall, Szeged; Attendance: 3,200; Referees: Sondors, Līcis (LAT)

17 November 2019; 19:00	Elverum Håndball (Norway)	25–26	MOL-Pick Szeged	Terningen Arena, Elverum; Attendance: 1,941; Referees: Kurtagic, Wetterwik (SWE)
17 November 2019; 19:00	Sandell 10	(9–14)	Maqueda 6	Terningen Arena, Elverum; Attendance: 1,941; Referees: Kurtagic, Wetterwik (SWE)
17 November 2019; 19:00	1× (yellow card) 2× (suspension)	Report	1× (yellow card) 5× (suspension)	Terningen Arena, Elverum; Attendance: 1,941; Referees: Kurtagic, Wetterwik (SWE)

24 November 2019; 17:00	Celje Pivovarna Laško (Slovenia)	23–34	MOL-Pick Szeged	Zlatorog Arena, Celje; Attendance: 4,900; Referees: Brunner, Salah (SUI)
24 November 2019; 17:00	Šarac 6	(11–19)	Bánhidi 7	Zlatorog Arena, Celje; Attendance: 4,900; Referees: Brunner, Salah (SUI)
24 November 2019; 17:00	2× (yellow card) 4× (suspension)	Report	1× (yellow card) 4× (suspension)	Zlatorog Arena, Celje; Attendance: 4,900; Referees: Brunner, Salah (SUI)

30 November 2019; 17:30	MOL-Pick Szeged	33–23	(Croatia) PPD Zagreb	Municipal Sports Hall, Szeged; Attendance: 3,200; Referees: Gousko, Repkin (BLR)
30 November 2019; 17:30	Cañellas 5	(14–7)	Gadža 7	Municipal Sports Hall, Szeged; Attendance: 3,200; Referees: Gousko, Repkin (BLR)
30 November 2019; 17:30	3× (yellow card) 1× (suspension)	Report	3× (yellow card) 2× (suspension)	Municipal Sports Hall, Szeged; Attendance: 3,200; Referees: Gousko, Repkin (BLR)

8 February 2020; 18:00	MOL-Pick Szeged	26–26	(Denmark) Aalborg Handbold	Municipal Sports Hall, Szeged; Attendance: 3,200; Referees: Leszczyński, Piechota (POL)
8 February 2020; 18:00	Bombač 5	(13–15)	Juul, Smárason 6	Municipal Sports Hall, Szeged; Attendance: 3,200; Referees: Leszczyński, Piechota (POL)
8 February 2020; 18:00	2× (yellow card) 1× (suspension)	Report	4× (yellow card) 4× (suspension)	Municipal Sports Hall, Szeged; Attendance: 3,200; Referees: Leszczyński, Piechota (POL)

16 February 2020; 17:00	MOL-Pick Szeged	32–29	(France) Paris Saint-Germain	Municipal Sports Hall, Szeged; Attendance: 3,200; Referees: Madsen, Mortensen (DEN)
16 February 2020; 17:00	Cañellas 10	(15–18)	Hansen 7	Municipal Sports Hall, Szeged; Attendance: 3,200; Referees: Madsen, Mortensen (DEN)
16 February 2020; 17:00	1× (yellow card) 3× (suspension) 1× (red card)	Report	1× (yellow card) 3× (suspension)	Municipal Sports Hall, Szeged; Attendance: 3,200; Referees: Madsen, Mortensen (DEN)

19 February 2020; 19:00	SG Flensburg-Handewitt (Germany)	34–26	MOL-Pick Szeged	Flens-Arena, Flensburg; Attendance: 4,355; Referees: Gubica, Milošević (CRO)
19 February 2020; 19:00	Jurecki 6	(17–11)	Cañellas 5	Flens-Arena, Flensburg; Attendance: 4,355; Referees: Gubica, Milošević (CRO)
19 February 2020; 19:00	1× (yellow card) 5× (suspension)	Report	2× (yellow card) 6× (suspension)	Flens-Arena, Flensburg; Attendance: 4,355; Referees: Gubica, Milošević (CRO)

29 February 2020; 20:00	Barça (Spain)	30–28	MOL-Pick Szeged	Palau Blaugrana, Barcelona; Attendance: 3,658; Referees: Lah, Sok (SLO)
29 February 2020; 20:00	Cindrić, Dolenec 7	(13–15)	Bodó 7	Palau Blaugrana, Barcelona; Attendance: 3,658; Referees: Lah, Sok (SLO)
29 February 2020; 20:00	2× (yellow card) 4× (suspension)	Report	2× (yellow card) 5× (suspension)	Palau Blaugrana, Barcelona; Attendance: 3,658; Referees: Lah, Sok (SLO)

===== Results overview =====
Opposition	Home score	Away score	Double
(France) Paris Saint-Germain	32–29	30–25	57-59
(Spain) Barça	31–28	30–28	59-58
(Germany) SG Flensburg-Handewitt	24–24	34–26	50-58
(Denmark) Aalborg Håndbold	26–26	28–35	61-54
(Croatia) PPD Zagreb	33–23	21–26	59-44
(Norway) Elverum Håndball	32–25	25–26	58-50
(Slovenia) Celje Pivovarna Laško	31–24	23–34	65-47

==== Knockout stage ====
===== Round of 16 =====
21 March 2020; 18:00	Vardar (North Macedonia)	Cancalled	MOL-Pick Szeged	Jane Sandanski Arena, Skopje
21 March 2020; 18:00		(–)		Jane Sandanski Arena, Skopje
21 March 2020; 18:00		Report		Jane Sandanski Arena, Skopje

7 March 2020; 15:00	MOL-Pick Szeged	Cancalled	(North Macedonia) Vardar	Municipal Sports Hall, Szeged
7 March 2020; 15:00		(–)		Municipal Sports Hall, Szeged
7 March 2020; 15:00		Report		Municipal Sports Hall, Szeged

== Statistics ==
=== Top scorers ===
Includes all competitive matches. The list is sorted by shirt number when total goals are equal.

Last updated on 28 December 2019

Position	Nation	No.	Name	Hungarian League	Hungarian Cup	Champions League	Total
1	(Serbia)	17	Bogdan Radivojević	57	0	54	111
2	(Slovenia)	24	Mario Šoštarič	83	0	15	98
3	(Spain)	5	Jorge Maqueda	30	0	37	67
4	(Hungary)	27	Bence Bánhidi	22	0	46	66
5	(Slovenia)	44	Dean Bombač	35	0	21	56
	(Sweden)	8	Jonas Källman	30	0	26	56
7	(Hungary)	9	Richárd Bodó	36	0	19	55
6	(Croatia)	7	Luka Stepančić	30	0	22	52
9	(Spain)	14	Joan Cañellas	33	0	16	49
	(Russia)	89	Dmitry Zhitnikov	31	0	18	49
11	(Czech Republic)	37	Stanislav Kašpárek	42	0	6	48
12	(Slovenia)	15	Nik Henigman	27	0	3	30
13	(Hungary)	45	Miklós Rosta	23	0	1	24
14	(Slovenia)	22	Matej Gaber	13	0	9	22
15	(Iceland)	22	Stefán Rafn Sigurmannsson	12	0	2	14
16	(Hungary)	39	Brúnó Bajusz	6	0	1	7
17	(Hungary)	52	Martin Nagy	2	0	0	2
18	(Croatia)	32	Mirko Alilović	0	0	1	1
			TOTALS	19	0		27

=== Attendances ===
List of the home matches:

Round	Against	Attadance	Capatility	Date
NB I- 1.	Csurgói KK	2,000	62,5%	August 31, 2019
NB I- 2.	Sport36-Komló	1,500	46,9%	September 6, 2019
NB I- 3.	Váci KSE	1,000	31,3%	September 10, 2019
CL-(GS) 1.	Barça (Spain)	3,200	100,0%	September 14, 2019
CL-(GS) 3.	SG Flensburg-Handewitt (Germany)	3,200	100,0%	September 28, 2019
NB I- 5.	Mezőkövesdi KC	1,500	46,9%	October 5, 2019
NB I- 7.	Balatonfüredi KSE	2,000	62,5%	October 16, 2019
CL-(GS) 6.	Celje Pivovarna Laško (Slovenia)	3,200	100,0%	November 3, 2019
NB I- 9.	HE-DO B. Braun Gyöngyös	1,200	37,5%	November 5, 2019
CL-(GS) 7.	Elverum Håndball (Norway)	3,200	100,0%	November 10, 2019
NB I- 25.	Dabas VSE KC	1,000	31,3%	November 12, 2019
NB I- 11.	SBS-Eger	1,600	50,0%	November 26, 2019
CL-(GS) 10.	PPD Zagreb (Croatia)	3,200	100,0%	November 30, 2019
NB I- 13.	FTC-HungaroControl	2,000	62,5%	December 13, 2019
CL-(GS) 11.	Aalborg Håndbold (Denmark)	3,200	100,0%	February 8, 2020
NB I- 21.	Budakalász FKC	1,000	31,3%	February 11, 2020
CL-(GS) 12.	Paris Saint-Germain (France)	3,200	100,0%	February 16, 2020
NB I- 17.	Grundfos Tatabánya KC	3,000	93,8%	February 25, 2020
