= 2015–16 Nemzeti Bajnokság I (men's handball) =

NB I
- Season: 2015–16
- Champions: Veszprém (24th title)
- Champions League: MVM Veszprém; MOL-Pick Szeged

The 2015–16 Nemzeti Bajnokság I (known as the K&H férfi kézilabda liga for sponsorship reasons) is the 64th season of the Nemzeti Bajnokság I, Hungary's premier Handball league.

== Team information ==
Location of teams in 2015-16 Nemzeti Bajnokság I

The following 14 clubs compete in the NB I during the 2015–16 season:

Team	Location	Arena	Capacity
Balatonfüredi KSE	Balatonfüred	Balatonfüredi Szabadidőközpont	712
Balmazújvárosi KK	Balmazújváros	Kőnig Rendezvényközpont	880
Ceglédi KKSE	Cegléd	Gál József Sportcsarnok	1,046
Csurgói KK	Csurgó	Sótonyi László Sportcsarnok	1,200
Eger-Eszterházy SzSE	Eger	Kemény Ferenc Sportcsarnok	875
Gyöngyösi KK	Gyöngyös	Dr. Fejes András Sportcsarnok	1,500
Komlói BSK	Komló	Komlói Sportközpont	800
Mezőkövesdi KC	Mezőkövesd	Városi Sportcsarnok	850
Orosházi FKSE	Orosháza	Eötvös Sportcsarnok	900
PLER KC	Budapest	Lőrinci Sportcsarnok	600
SC Pick Szeged	Szeged	Újszegedi Sportcsarnok	3,097
Tatabánya KC	Tatabánya	Földi Imre Sportcsarnok	1,000
Váci KSE	Vác	Városi Sportcsarnok	800
Veszprém KC	Veszprém	Veszprém Aréna	5,096

Team from SEHA League

=== Personnel and kits ===
Following is the list of clubs competing in 2015–16 Nemzeti Bajnokság I, with their president, head coach, kit manufacturer and shirt sponsor.

Team	President	Head coach	Kit manufacturer	Shirt sponsor(s)
Balatonfüred	László Csima	(Hungary) István Csoknyai	Erima	77 Elektronika, Sennebogen, Volkswagen, Kinizsi Bank^{1}
Balmazújváros	Sándor Király	(Hungary) Ferenc Füzesi	Erima	König-Trade Kft., Thermal Hotel Balmaz
Cegléd	István Borsos	(Hungary) István Kökény	Erima	BSS 2000 Kft.^{1}
Csurgó	János Varga	(Hungary) László Sótonyi	hummel	MenDan, Patrik & Varga
Eger-Eszterházy	Róbert Szabó	(Hungary) Edmond Tóth	Erima	Szerencsejáték Zrt., SBS, Eger / Hesi, Detki^{1}
Gyöngyös	Zsolt Marczin	(Hungary) Viktor Debre	Salming	B. Braun / Gyöngyös Önkormányzata^{1}
Komlói BSK	Szabolcs Szigeti	(Montenegro) Ratko Đurković	Zeus	Sport36
Mezőkövesd	Róbert Rapi	(Hungary) László Skaliczki	Erima	Mezőkövesd Önkormányzata, Szerencsejáték Zrt. / Kovács Kft.^{1}
Orosháza	Tamás Vájer	(Serbia) Vladan Jordović	ASICS	Linamar, Continental / Szerencsejáték Zrt.^{1}
PLER	László Németh	(Hungary) István Hutvágner	Erima	HungaroControl, Városgazda XVIII. ker.
Szeged	Nándor Szögi	(Spain) Juan Carlos Pastor	adidas	MOL, Pick, OTP Bank / Toyota^{1}
Tatabánya	László Marosi	(Serbia) Vladan Matić	Jako	Grundfos
Vác	Dr. Attila Schoffer	(Hungary) Gyula Zsiga	Kempa	Aquaprofit / Repeta Bisztró, emblemazas.hu^{1}
Veszprém	Ákos Hunyadfalvy	(Spain) Xavier Sabaté	adidas	Veszprém, Balaton / Euronics, Kinizsi Bank^{1}

1. On the back of shirt.
2. On the shorts.
3. Additionally, referee kits are now being made by Adidas, sponsored by Provident.

==== Managerial changes ====
Team	Outgoing manager	Manner of departure	Date of vacancy	Position in table	Replaced by	Date of appointment
Eger-Eszterházy	(Hungary) István Rosta	Resigned	17 February 2016	12th	(Hungary) Edmond Tóth	17 February 2016

== Regular season (Alapszakasz) ==
Pos	Team	Pld	W	D	L	GF	GA	GD	Pts	Qualification
1	MOL-Pick Szeged	24	23	0	1	797	596	+201	46	Championship Round
2	Grundfos Tatabánya KC	24	19	2	3	647	552	+95	40	Championship Round
3	Balatonfüredi KSE	24	16	2	6	653	580	+73	34	Championship Round
4	Csurgói KK	24	15	2	7	620	583	+37	32	Championship Round
5	Váci KSE	24	10	2	12	657	690	−33	22	Championship Round
6	Sport36-Komló	24	9	2	13	567	625	−58	20 (Note: KBSK: 7 pts; BKK: 3 pts; GYKK: 2 pts)	Relegation Round
7	Kőnig-Trade Balmazújváros	24	8	4	12	587	607	−20	20	Relegation Round
8	B.Braun Gyöngyös	24	9	2	13	561	577	−16	20	Relegation Round
9	Orosházi FKSE-LINAMAR	24	6	6	12	572	607	−35	18	Relegation Round
10	Ceglédi KKSE	24	7	3	14	625	671	−46	17	Relegation Round
11	Mezőkövesdi KC	24	6	3	15	573	615	−42	15 (Note: MKC 27–24 EGER; EGER 25–23 MKC)	Relegation Round
12	Eger SBS Eszterházy	24	7	1	16	556	636	−80	15	Relegation Round
13	PLER-Budapest	24	6	1	17	573	649	−76	13	Relegation Round

=== Schedule and results ===
Home \ Away	BKSE	BKK	CEG	CSKK	EGER	GYKK	KBSK	MKC	ORO	PLER	SZE	TAT	VÁC
Balatonfüred		22–23	37–29	25–22	31–23	26–15	31–25	33–18	29–27	31–25	28–36	31–27	35–28
Balmazújváros	23–24		31–25	23–23	22–21	21–24	28–28	24–24	26–26	25–20	25–28	24–18	28–30
Cegléd	24–24	28–26		25–27	32–24	31–30	26–23	27–26	27–31	23–22	27–37	26–30	20–26
Csurgó	29–22	25–17	29–22		25–21	28–27	30–24	31–26	22–19	22–26	26–28	19–21	34–29
Eger	20–28	26–18	24–25	24–22		19–23	29–22	25–23	31–26	30–29	23–32	23–31	21–30
Gyöngyös	18–19	19–21	29–27	27–32	23–22		21–23	21–21	24–21	31–17	26–34	17–22	30–21
Komlói BSK	23–24	26–23	24–21	22–30	25–25	25–19		20–16	23–24	25–21	25–38	17–20	26–25
Mezőkövesd	19–30	22–19	29–25	24–26	27–24	18–21	35–24		21–26	26–24	23–25	23–23	32–27
Orosháza	23–23	23–25	27–27	17–21	28–19	22–22	19–25	27–23		25–25	26–39	21–21	24–25
PLER Budapest	27–25	24–27	27–25	23–25	21–22	19–24	23–20	28–27	19–22		23–34	22–29	31–30
Szeged	34–26	38–30	32–30	33–25	37–20	33–24	35–21	33–23	27–19	36–26		29–23	40–29
Tatabánya	23–21	29–28	27–24	31–20	27–19	25–23	33–21	27–24	31–23	32–22	27–26		39–22
Vác	19–28	34–30	29–29	27–27	29–21	30–23	29–30	25–23	32–26	33–29	21–33	27–31	

Legend: Blue = home team win; Yellow = draw; Red = away team win.

== Championship round (Felsőház) ==
Pos	Team	Pld	W	D	L	GF	GA	GD	Pts	Qualification
1	MVM Veszprém(C)	10	9	1	0	319	231	+88	19	Qualification to Champions League group phase
2	MOL-Pick Szeged	10	8	1	1	327	255	+72	17	Qualification to Champions League group phase
3	Grundfos Tatabánya KC	10	6	0	4	260	269	−9	12	Qualification to EHF Cup qualifying round 3
4	Balatonfüredi KSE	10	3	0	7	248	276	−28	6	Qualification to EHF Cup qualifying round 2
5	Csurgói KK	10	2	0	8	259	292	−33	4	Qualification to EHF Cup qualifying round 1
6	Váci KSE	10	1	0	9	220	310	−90	2	

=== Schedule and results ===
Home \ Away	BKSE	CSKK	SZE	TAT	VÁC	VES
Balatonfüred		29–26	20–30	23–24	26–22	24–33
Csurgó	28–21		25–34	20–24	27–20	22–31
Szeged	30–26	37–26		37–32	36–23	26–26
Tatabánya	29–24	29–28	23–33		25–19	25–32
Vác	19–31	35–34	24–35	22–27		21–33
Veszprém	35–24	32–23	30–29	31–22	36–15	

Legend: Blue = home team win; Yellow = draw; Red = away team win.

== Relegation round (Alsóház) ==
That team before the round was started, got bonus points, they received to them to bee based ranked in regular season; Sport36-Komló has got 11 bonus points, Kőnig-Trade Balmazújváros 10 bonus point, B.Braun Gyöngyös 8 points, Orosházi FKSE-LINAMAR 7 points, Ceglédi KKSE 5 points, Mezőkövesdi KC 4 points, Eger SBS Eszterházy 2 points, PLER-Budapest 1 point.

Pos	Team	Pld	W	D	L	GF	GA	GD	Pts	Relegation
7	Kőnig-Trade Balmazújváros	14	6	3	5	345	342	+3	25	
8	Mezőkövesdi KC	14	8	4	2	350	333	+17	24	
9	Orosházi FKSE-LINAMAR	14	7	2	5	357	349	+8	23	
10	B.Braun Gyöngyös	14	6	2	6	371	346	+25	22	
11	Sport36-Komló	14	4	1	9	349	384	−35	20	
12	Ceglédi KKSE	14	5	2	7	381	379	+2	17	
13	Eger SBS Eszterházy (Note: Following 2015–16 Nemzeti Bajnokság I/B Eastern Group champions Levendula Hotel FKSE-Algyő have declined the promotion due to financial reasons, Eger SBS Eszterházy maintained its top division membership.)	14	6	1	7	350	347	+3	15	
14	PLER-Budapest	14	6	1	7	351	374	−23	14	Relegation to the Nemzeti Bajnokság I/B

=== Schedule and results ===
Home \ Away	BKK	CEG	EGER	GYKK	KBSK	MKC	ORO	PLER
Balmazújváros		29–29	23–22	26–25	30–20	18–18	21–26	28–27
Cegléd	32–26		21–24	31–29	25–18	27–29	27–27	29–30
Eger	22–21	28–26		25–31	27–25	24–25	23–25	29–21
Gyöngyös	27–20	28–29	22–22		29–25	22–24	26–21	32–22
Komlói BSK	17–24	32–30	25–28	31–31		28–25	22–26	22–27
Mezőkövesd	24–24	28–24	27–25	23–21	29–24		23–23	30–25
Orosháza	28–26	28–23	26–25	25–28	25–28	28–25		27–28
PLER Budapest	25–29	23–28	29–26	22–20	28–32	20–20	24–22	

Legend: Blue = home team win; Yellow = draw; Red = away team win.

== Season statistics ==
=== Number of teams by counties ===
Pos.	County (megye)	No. of teams	Teams
1	Heves	2	Eger-Eszterházy SzSE and Gyöngyösi KK
1	Pest	2	Ceglédi KKSE and Váci KSE
1	Veszprém	2	Balatonfüredi KSE and MVM Veszprém
4	Baranya	1	Komlói BSK
4	Békés	1	Orosházi FKSE
4	Borsod-Abaúj-Zemplén	1	Mezőkövesdi KC
4	Budapest	1	PLER
4	Csongrád	1	MOL-Pick Szeged
4	Hajdú-Bihar	1	Balmazújvárosi KK
4	Komárom-Esztergom	1	Tatabánya KC
4	Somogy	1	Csurgói KK

== Hungarian clubs in European competitions ==
EHF Champions League

- MVM Veszprém

Round		Club	Home	Away	Aggregate
Group Phase (Group A)		(Germany) THW Kiel	29–27	24–25	2nd
Group Phase (Group A)		(France) Paris Saint-Germain	28–20	27–29	2nd
Group Phase (Group A)		(Slovenia) RK Celje Pivovarna Laško	34–28	30–27	2nd
Group Phase (Group A)		(Poland) Orlen Wisła Płock	27–25	27-27	2nd
Group Phase (Group A)		(Croatia) RK Prvo plinarsko društvo Zagreb	27–25	21–20	2nd
Group Phase (Group A)		(Turkey) Beşiktaş J.K.	33–25	38–34	2nd
Group Phase (Group A)		(Germany) SG Flensburg-Handewitt	28–24	29–28	2nd
Last 16		(Ukraine) Motor Zaporizhzhia	41–28	29–24	70–52
Quarter Final		(North Macedonia) RK Vardar	30-30	29–26	59–56
FF	Semi-final	(Germany) THW Kiel	31–28 (aet)		
FF	FINAL	(Poland) Vive Targi Kielce	35–35 (3-4 p)		

- MOL-Pick Szeged

Round	Club	Home	Away	Aggregate
Group Phase (Group B)	(Spain) FC Barcelona Lassa	28–30	25–30	5th
Group Phase (Group B)	(Poland) Vive Tauron Kielce	31–30	26–27	5th
Group Phase (Group B)	(North Macedonia) RK Vardar	29–31	23–27	5th
Group Phase (Group B)	(Denmark) KIF Kolding København	34–23	27–22	5th
Group Phase (Group B)	(Germany) Rhein-Neckar Löwen	30–24	25–30	5th
Group Phase (Group B)	(Sweden) IFK Kristianstad	35–28	34–32	5th
Group Phase (Group B)	(France) Montpellier HB	28–27	29-29	5th
Last 16	(Germany) THW Kiel	33–29	29–36	62–65

EHF Cup

- Grundfos Tatabánya KC

Round	Club	Home	Away	Aggregate
Qual. Round 3	(Sweden) Ystads IF	20–31	28-28	48–59

- Csurgói KK

Round	Club	Home	Away	Aggregate
Qual. Round 2	(Poland) Pogoń Szczecin	29–19	30–27	59–46
Qual. Round 3	(Germany) SC Magdeburg	24–23	37–42	61–65

== See also ==
- 2015–16 Magyar Kupa
- 2015–16 Nemzeti Bajnokság I/B
