= Milan Popović (handballer) =

Montenegrin handball player (born 1990)

Personal information
- Nationality: Montenegrin
- Born: 23 September 1990 (age 36) Cetinje, Montenegro
- Height: 1.86 m (6 ft 1 in)

Sport
- Sport: Handball
- Position: Left wing
- Current club: HC Lovćen Cetinje
- Number: 6

Senior clubs
- Years: Team
- –2015: RK Lovćen
- 2015–2017: Váci KSE
- 2018–2019: RK Pelister
- 2019–2021: RK Metalurg Skopje
- 2021–: Steaua București
National team
- Years: Team
- –: Montenegro

Milan Popović (born 23 September 1990) is a Montenegrin handball player who plays as a left wing for HC Lovćen Cetinje. In the 2020–21 EHF European League, he scored 58 goals for HC Metalurg.
