= 2019–20 Nemzeti Bajnokság I (men's handball) =

K&H férfi liga
- Season: 2019–20
- Matches: 184

The 2019–20 Nemzeti Bajnokság I (known as the K&H férfi kézilabda liga for sponsorship reasons) is the 69th season of the Nemzeti Bajnokság I, Hungarian premier Handball league.

== Team information ==
As in the previous season, 14 teams played in the 2018–19 season. After the 2018–19 season, Ceglédi KKSE and Vecsés SE were relegated to the 2019–20 Nemzeti Bajnokság I/B. They were replaced by two clubs from the 2018–19 Nemzeti Bajnokság I/B; Orosházi FKSE and Váci KSE.

Location of teams in 2019–20 Nemzeti Bajnokság I

Team	Location	Arena	Capacity
Balatonfüredi KSE	Balatonfüred	Balatonfüredi Szabadidőközpont	712
Budakalász FKC	Budakalász	Budakalászi Sportcsarnok	400
Csurgói KK	Csurgó	Sótonyi László Sportcsarnok	1,200
Dabas KK	Dabas	OBO Aréna	1,920
DVTK-Eger	Eger	Kemény Ferenc Sportcsarnok	875
Ferencvárosi TC	Budapest, IX. ker	Elek Gyula Aréna	1,300
Gyöngyösi KK	Gyöngyös	Dr. Fejes András Sportcsarnok	1,500
Komlói BSK	Komló	Komlói Sportközpont	800
Mezőkövesdi KC	Mezőkövesd	Városi Sportcsarnok	850
Orosházi FKSE	Orosháza	Eötvös Sportcsarnok	740
SC Pick Szeged	Szeged	Újszegedi Sportcsarnok	3,200
Tatabánya KC	Tatabánya	Földi Imre Sportcsarnok	1,000
Váci KSE	Vác	Városi Sportcsarnok	620
Veszprém KC	Veszprém	Veszprém Aréna	5,096

=== Personnel and kits ===
Following is the list of clubs competing in 2018–19 Nemzeti Bajnokság I, with their president, head coach, kit manufacturer and shirt sponsor.

Team	President	Head coach	Kit manufacturer	Shirt sponsor(s)
Balatonfüred	László Csima	(Hungary) István Csoknyai	Erima	tippmix^{1}, Sennebogen, 77 Elektronika, Takarékbank
Budakalász	Gábor Hajdu	(Hungary) Gyula Forgács	2Rule	tippmix^{1}
Csurgó	János Varga	(Hungary) József Bencze	hummel	tippmix^{1}, PriMont, MenDan****
Dabas	Csaba Prohászka	(Hungary) Győző Tomori	hummel	tippmix^{1}, OBO, Volvo Galéria
DVTK-Eger	Róbert Szabó	(Hungary) Edmond Tóth	hummel	tippmix^{1}, SBS, Apollo Tyres
Ferencváros	Gábor Kubatov	(Hungary) Attila Horváth	Nike	tippmix^{1}, my drone space, Lidl, Budapest
Gyöngyös	Zsolt Marczin	(Hungary) Csaba Konkoly	hummel	B. Braun, tippmix^{1}, HE-DO
Komlói BSK	Szabolcs Szigeti	(Hungary) Bálint Klivinger	Zeus	tippmix^{1}, Sport36 Komló
Mezőkövesd	Róbert Rapi	(Hungary) Dániel Buday	hummel	tippmixPro^{1}, Mezőkövesd
Orosháza	Tamás Vájer	(Montenegro) Ratko Đurković	Kappa	tippmix^{1}, Linamar
Szeged	Nándor Szögi	(Spain) Juan Carlos Pastor	adidas	MOL, tippmix^{1}, Pick, OTP Bank
Tatabánya	László Marosi	(Serbia) Vladan Matić	Jako	tippmix^{1}, Grundfos
Vác	Dr. Attila Schoffer	(Hungary) László Skaliczki	adidas	tippmix^{1}, CBA Príma
Veszprém	Gábor Kálomista	(Spain) David Davis	hummel	Veszprém, Telekom, tippmix^{1}, Euroaszfalt

=== Managerial changes ===
Team	Outgoing manager	Manner of departure	Date of vacancy	Position in table	Replaced by	Date of appointment
Orosháza	(Hungary) Botond Bakó	Mutual consent	End of 2018–19 season	Pre-season	(Montenegro) Ratko Đurković	24 June 2019

== League table ==
Pos	Team	Pld	W	D	L	GF	GA	GD	Pts	Qualification or relegation
1	MOL-Pick Szeged	20	19	0	1	733	485	+248	38	
2	Telekom Veszprém	18	18	0	0	653	451	+202	36	
3	HE-DO B. Braun Gyöngyös	17	11	1	5	512	468	+44	23	
4	FTC-HungaroControl	18	11	1	6	518	484	+34	23	
5	Grundfos Tatabánya KC	17	11	0	6	485	446	+39	22	
6	Balatonfüredi KSE	18	10	1	7	525	496	+29	21	
7	Csurgói KK	18	9	1	8	450	457	−7	19	
8	Sport36-Komló	18	8	2	8	470	478	−8	18	
9	Dabasi KC VSE	18	6	1	11	459	527	−68	13	
10	SBS-Eger	17	5	2	10	457	522	−65	12	
11	Orosházi FKSE - Linamar	18	4	2	12	451	520	−69	10	
12	Mezőkövesdi KC	18	2	5	11	451	552	−101	9	Relegation to Nemzeti Bajnokság I/B
13	Budakalász Kézilabda ZRT	19	2	1	16	468	565	−97	5	
14	VKSE KFT Vác	18	1	1	16	417	598	−181	3	Relegation to Nemzeti Bajnokság I/B

Updated to match(es) played on October 2020. Source: mksz.hu
Rules for classification: 1) Points; 2) Goal difference; 3) Head-to-head points; 4) Head-to-head goal difference; 5) Goals scored; 6) Matches won; 7) Draw (Note: Head-to-head record is used only after all the matches between the teams in question have been played)

== Season statistics ==
=== Number of teams by counties ===
Pos.	County (megye)	No. of teams	Teams
1	Pest	3	Budakalász FKC, Dabas KK and Váci KSE
2	Heves	2	SBS Eger and Gyöngyösi KK
2	Veszprém	2	Balatonfüredi KSE and Telekom Veszprém
4	Baranya	1	Komlói BSK
4	Békés	1	Orosházi FKSE
4	Borsod-Abaúj-Zemplén	1	Mezőkövesdi KC
4	Budapest (capital)	1	Ferencvárosi TC
4	Csongrád	1	MOL-Pick Szeged
4	Komárom-Esztergom	1	Tatabánya KC
4	Somogy	1	Csurgói KK

== See also ==
- 2019–20 Magyar Kupa
- 2019–20 Nemzeti Bajnokság I/B
- 2019–20 Nemzeti Bajnokság II
