= Donát Bartók =

Hungarian handball player (born 1996)

Personal information
- Nationality: Hungarian
- Born: 13 July 1996 (age 30) Szeged, Hungary
- Height: 1.91 m (6 ft 3 in)

Sport
- Sport: Handball
- Position: Right back
- Current club: Kadetten Schaffhausen
- Number: 10

Senior clubs
- Years: Team
- 2013–2015: Tatabánya KC
- 2015–2016: Váci KSE
- 2016–2019: TBV Lemgo
- 2020–2021: Bidasoa Irún
- 2021–2025: Kadetten Schaffhausen
National team
Years	Team	Apps	(Gls)
2018–2020	Hungary	12	(21)
Medal record
Youth European Championship
Silver medal – second place	2014 Poland

Donát Bartók (born 13 July 1996) is a Hungarian handball player for Kadetten Schaffhausen and the Hungarian national handball team.

== Career ==
He joined the Bundesliga team TBV Lemgo in November 2016. On his debut match he broke his finger and was unable to play for 8 weeks. In August 2017 he prolonged his contract with the club until 2020. In December 2019 he decided to leave his club, because of the lack of playing time. He joined Bidasoa Irún in January 2020. He joined Kadetten Schaffhausen in January 2021.

He made his debut in the national team in January 2018 against Sweden.

In 2025 he announced his decision to retire from handball.

== Personal life ==
His father, Csaba Bartók is a former handballer who played for the Hungarian national handball team.
