= András Szász =

Romanian handball player (born 1994)

Personal information
- Full name: András Szász
- Nationality: Romanian
- Born: 24 January 1994 (age 32) Odorhei, Romania
- Height: 1.96 m (6 ft 5 in)

Sport
- Sport: Handball
- Position: Pivot
- Current club: CSM Constanta
National team
- Years: Team
- 2016–2018: Romania

András Szász (born 24 January 1994) is a Romanian handballer who plays as a pivot for CSM Constanta and is a current Romania men's national handball team player.

== International honours ==
- EHF Challenge Cup:
  - Winner: 2015
