= 2019–20 Magyar Kupa (men's handball) =

Hungarian men's handball season

Tournament details
- Country: Hungary
- Dates: 27 August 2019 – 17 May 2020
- Teams: 51

Tournament statistics
- Matches played: 47 + 4 (Final four)

Awards

The 2019–20 Magyar Kupa, known as (Hungarian: TippMix férfi Magyar Kupa) for sponsorship reasons, was the 62nd edition of the tournament.

== Schedule ==
The rounds of the 2019–20 competition are scheduled as follows:

Round	Draw date and time	Matches	Number of fixtures	Clubs	New entries this round
Pre-qualifying	1 August 2019, 11:00 CEST	1 September 2019	5	10 → 5	10
Round I	1 August 2019, 11:00 CEST	18 September 2019	16	32 → 16	27
Round II	20 September 2019, 11:00 CEST	16 October 2019	8	16 → 8	none
Round III	18 October 2019, 11:00 CEST	13 November 2019	8	16 → 8	8
Round IV	15 November 2019, 11:00 CET	11 December 2019	6	12 → 6	4
Round V	13 December 2019, 11:00 CET	11 March 2020	4	8 → 4	2
Final four	? 2020, 11:00 CET	16–17 May 2020	4	4 → 1	none

== Matches ==
A total of 51 matches took place, starting with Pre-qualifying on 27 August 2019 and culminating with the Final on 17 May 2020.

=== Pre-qualifying ===
The pre-qualifying round ties was scheduled for 27–29 August 2019.

Team 1	Score	Team 2
27 August
Budakalászi SC (II)	24–29	(I/B) Hatvani KSZSE
Pénzügyőr SE (II)	15–42	(I/B) Budai Farkasok
28 August
Rinyamenti KC (II)	17–39	(I/B) NEKA
29 August
Nyírbátori SC (II)	22–29	(I/B) ÓAM-Ózdi KC
VSK Tököl (II)	18–30	(I/B) Szigetszetmiklósi KSK

=== First round ===
The first round ties was scheduled for 2–17 September 2019.

Team 1	Score	Team 2
2 September
Hajdúböszörményi TE (II)	24–29	(I/B) Nyíregyházi KC
3 September
Solymári SC (Count.)	31–27	(II) Csömöri KSK
5 September
Alba-MÁV Előre (II)	29–32	(I/B) Rév TSC
Tiszavasvári SE (II)	27–42	(I/B) Balmazújvárosi KK
6 September
Kisvárdai KC (II)	24–30	(I/B) ÓAM-Ózdi KC
KTE-Piroska szörp (I/B)	28–27	(I/B) Optimum Solar-Békési FKC
Szigetszetmiklósi KSK (I/B)	26–27	(I/B) PLER-Budapest
7 September
Kalocsai KC (II)	30–37	(I/B) Pécsi VSE
KK Ajka (II)	22–27	(I/B) Veszprémi KSE-Felsőörs
8 September
Hatvani KSZSE (I/B)	19–21	(I/B) Balassagyarmati Kábel SE
10 September
Agrofeed ETO-SZESE (I/B)	34–25	(I/B) Tatai AC
Százhalombattai KE (II)	22–27	(I/B) Budai Farkasok
17 September
Szolnoki KCSE (II)	26–39	(I/B) Vecsés SE
NEKA (I/B)	32–30	(Count.) PEAC
Mizse KC (I/B)	31–30	(I/B) ContiTech FKSE-Algyő
Üllői VKSK (II)	22–34	(I/B) Ceglédi KKSE

=== Second round ===
The second round ties was scheduled for 2–16 October 2019.

Team 1	Score	Team 2
2 October
PLER-Budapest (I/B)	34–31	(I/B) Ceglédi KKSE
Budai Farkasok (I/B)	30–27	(I/B) Veszprémi KSE-Felsőörs
9 October
Pécsi VSE (I/B)	33–30	(I/B) Mizse KC
10 October
Rév TSC (I/B)	22–21	(I/B) Vecsés SE
15 October
NEKA (I/B)	24–21	(I/B) KTE-Piroska szörp
Solymári SC (Count.)	31–43	(I/B) Agrofeed ETO-SZESE
16 October
ÓAM-Ózdi KC (I/B)	29–28	(I/B) Balassagyarmati Kábel SE
Nyíregyházi KC (I/B)	32–24	(I/B) Balmazújvárosi KK

=== Third round ===
The third round ties was scheduled for 5–13 November 2019.

Team 1	Score	Team 2
5 November
Budai Farkasok (I/B)	31–28	(I/B) Agrofeed ETO-SZESE
11 November
Dabas VSE KC (I)	30–31	(I) Orosházi FKSE- LINAMAR
12 November
Nyíregyházi KC (I/B)	27–29	(I/B) PLER-Budapest
ÓAM-Ózdi KC (I/B)	22–33	(I) Mezőkövesdi KC
13 November
Sport36-Komló (I)	33–31	(I) Váci KSE
NEKA (I/B)	28–31	(I) Budakalász FKC
Pécsi VSE (I/B)	27–30	(I) FTC-HungaroControl
Rév TSC (I/B)	20–24	(I) SBS-Eger

=== Fourth round ===
The fourth round ties was scheduled for 10–11 December 2019.

Team 1	Score	Team 2
10 December
Balatonfüredi KSE (I)	37–23	(I) SBS-Eger
Orosházi FKSE- LINAMAR (I)	23–23 (a)	(I) Grundfos Tatabánya KC
11 December
PLER-Budapest (I/B)	22–31	(I) Csurgói KK
Sport36-Komló (I)	41–28	(I) Budakalász FKC
HE-DO B. Braun Gyöngyös (I)	26–28	(I) Mezőkövesdi KC
Budai Farkasok (I/B)	26–32	(I) FTC-HungaroControl

=== Fifth round ===
The fifth round ties was scheduled for 3 February – 11 March 2020.

Team 1	Score	Team 2
3 February
Grundfos Tatabánya KC (I)	16–26	(I) Telekom Veszprém
14 February
Balatonfüredi KSE (I)	38–24	(I) Mezőkövesdi KC
13 March
MOL-Pick Szeged (I)	43–29	(I) FTC-HungaroControl
Csurgói KK (I)	31–24	(I) Sport36-Komló

== See also ==
- 2019–20 Nemzeti Bajnokság I
- 2019–20 Nemzeti Bajnokság I/B
- 2019–20 Nemzeti Bajnokság II
