= Sennebogen =

German machine building company

Sennebogen Maschinenfabrik GmbH
- Type: GmbH
- Industry: Construction equipment manufacturing
- Founded: 1952
- Founder: Erich Sennebogen
- Headquarters: Straubing, Lower Bavaria, Germany
- Key people: Erich Sennebogen; Walter Sennebogen
- Products: Cranes, duty cycle crawler cranes, telescopic cranes, port cranes, special machines, carrying machines, material handling machines, multiloaders
- Revenue: over EUR 600 million (2022, Company Group)
- Number of employees: over 2,200 (2023)
- Website: www.sennebogen.com

Sennebogen Maschinenfabrik GmbH is a German machine building company with more than 2,200 employees worldwide (2023) and a sales revenue of over 600 million Euro (2022, company group).

== History ==
The company was founded in 1952 by the then 21-year-old Erich Sennebogen (1931–2011) and initially manufactured agricultural machinery. In 1959, the lead plant was built in Straubing, Germany. The construction of a second factory in Wackersdorf followed in 1991. The company has been operating its own manufacturing facility for welding and steel fabrication in Balatonfüred, Hungary, since 1996. In important key regions, Sennebogen also has its own local subsidiaries:

- Sennebogen LLC in Stanley, North Carolina, USA
- Sennebogen Pte. Ltd. in Singapore

At the start of 2008, the Company expanded its facilities through the construction of a new and considerably larger factory in the Straubing-Sand industrial zone. Sennebogen today operates worldwide and produces complete model ranges encompassing duty cycle crawler cranes, cranes, telescopic cranes, mobile telescopic cranes, material handling machines and special carrying machinery.

The company is now, managed in its second generation by the sons of the founder, Erich and Walter Sennebogen.

== Products ==
As of 2019, the company manufacturers products of the following types:

- Cranes, Duty Cycle Crawler Cranes, Telescopic cranes, Port cranes
- Material handling machines
- Multiloaders
- Special machines, Carrying machines

== Gallery ==
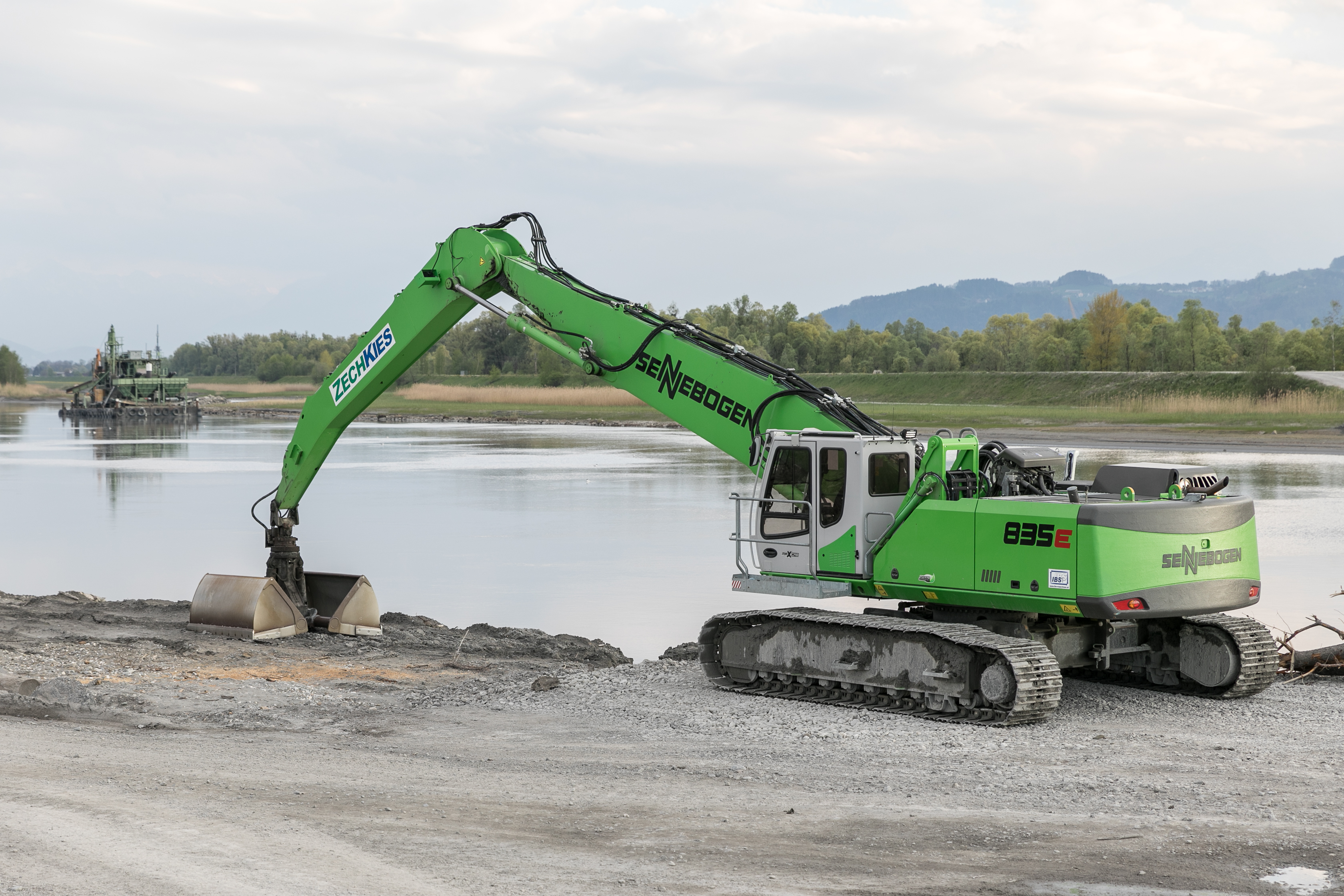
Sennebogen 835 R-HD E-Series material handler
