= Váci KSE =

Hungarian handball club

- Full name: Váci Kézilabda Sportegyesület
- Short name: VKSE
- Founded: 1947; 78 years ago
- Arena: Városi Sportcsarnok, Vác
- Capacity: 800 seats
- President: Dr. Schoffer Attila
- Head coach: Roland Kata
- League: Nemzeti Bajnokság I
- Club colours
Home	Away

Váci KSE is a Hungarian handball club from Vác, that plays in the Nemzeti Bajnokság I, the top level championship in Hungary.

Location of Váci KSE

== Crest, colours, supporters ==
=== Naming history ===
Name	Period
Váci KSE	–2009
Váci KSE-Taxi 2000	2009–2010
AXA Váci KSE-Taxi 2000	2010–2011
IPG Hungary-Váci KSE-Taxi 2000	2011–2012
Váci KSE	2012-2019
VKSE KFT Vác	2019-2020
Váci FKA	2020–present

=== Kit manufacturers and Shirt sponsor ===
The following table shows in detail Váci KSE kit manufacturers and shirt sponsors by year:

Period	Kit manufacturer	Shirt sponsor
	(Germany)	
2012–2013	(Germany)	Infopress Group
2013	(Germany)	
2014		DHL / emblemazas.hu /
2014–2015	(Germany)	–
2015–	(Germany)	Csocsaj Grill

=== Kits ===
HOME
2014–15	2016–17	2018–20

AWAY
2016–17	2017–18	2018–20

== Team 2012/13 ==
=== Current squad ===
Squad for the 2012–13 season

Goalkeepers

- 1 (Hungary) Norbert Vitáris
- 12 (Hungary) Levente Nagy
- 16 (Hungary) Ádám Valkusz

Wingers

- 2 (Hungary) Péter Szikra
- 9 (Hungary) Ferenc Császár
- 20 (Hungary) Máté Gábori
- 23 (Hungary) Máté Munkácsi

Line players

- 10 (Hungary) Mihály Tyiskov
- 15 (Hungary) István Rosta
- 19 (Hungary) Tibor Szabó

Back players

- 3 (Hungary) Ádám Bajorhegyi
- 5 (Hungary) Kristóf Székely
- 6 (Hungary) Péter Simányi
- 7 (Hungary) Balázs Dóra
- 8 (Hungary) Ádám Korsós
- 11 (Hungary) Tibor Kökény
- 13 (Hungary) Levente Sipeki
- 14 (Hungary) Gábor Karap
- 17 (Hungary) János Csík
- 18 (Hungary) Renátó Nikolicza
- 21 (Hungary) Pál Gergely

=== Staff members ===
- (Hungary) Head Coach: Roland Kata
- (Hungary) Club Doctor: Zoltán Jakab, MD
- (Hungary) Masseur: Ferenc Pálinkás

== Previous Squads ==
2017–2018 Team
Shirt No	Nationality	Player	Birth Date	Position
3	Hungary	Alex Bognár	25 September 2000 (age 24)	Central Back
5	Hungary	Ádám Török	26 May 1997 (age 27)	Central Back
7	Hungary	Koppány Törteli	2 October 1994 (age 30)	Central Back
8	Hungary	Attila Ménfői	6 August 1997 (age 27)	Right Winger
10	Hungary	Mihály Tyiskov	1 November 1990 (age 34)	Line Player
12	Hungary	Gergő Rózsavölgyi	8 May 1996 (age 28)	Goalkeeper
14	Croatia	Ante Grbavac	8 January 1994 (age 31)	Left Back
15	Slovakia	Maros Balaz	22 October 1989 (age 35)	Right Back
17	Hungary	Dávid Czene	21 July 1997 (age 27)	Left Back
19	Croatia	Marin Sakić	8 June 1987 (age 37)	Line Player
23	Serbia	Jožef Holpert	1 June 1988 (age 36)	Left Winger
24	Hungary	Tamás Kecskeméti	16 February 1998 (age 27)	Right Winger
25	Hungary	Kristóf Galbos	24 September 1998 (age 26)	Line Player
32	Hungary	Péter Ulicsinyi	28 September 1996 (age 28)	Goalkeeper
33	Hungary	Tamás Koller	30 September 1992 (age 32)	Left Back
34	Bosnia and Herzegovina	Marko Davidovic	27 August 1992 (age 32)	Central Back
55	Slovakia	Teodor Paul	22 April 1987 (age 37)	Goalkeeper
92	Hungary	Bence Tarkányi	2 November 1988 (age 36)	Right Winger

2016–2017 Team
Shirt No	Nationality	Player	Birth Date	Position
1	Hungary	Norbert Vitáris	1 January 1990 (age 35)	Goalkeeper
3	HungarySerbia	Marko Vasić	19 July 1989 (age 35)	Right Winger
5	CroatiaHungary	Petar Topic	30 December 1991 (age 33)	Line Player
6	Montenegro	Milan Popović	23 September 1990 (age 34)	Left Winger
7	Hungary	Koppány Törteli	2 October 1994 (age 30)	Central Back
8	Hungary	Attila Ménfői	6 August 1997 (age 27)	Right Winger
9	Hungary	Ferenc Császár	8 May 1983 (age 41)	Left Winger
10	Hungary	Mihály Tyiskov	1 November 1990 (age 34)	Line Player
11	Hungary	Péter Lendvay	15 September 1976 (age 48)	Central Back
12	Tunisia	Idriss Drissi	6 June 1987 (age 37)	Goalkeeper
15	Hungary	Jonatán Kerekes	16 September 1998 (age 26)	Left Back
17	Hungary	Dávid Czene	21 July 1997 (age 27)	Left Back
23	Serbia	Aleksandar Stanojević	10 March 1984 (age 41)	Right Back
23	Hungary	Robin Munkácsi	19 November 1994 (age 30)	Line Player
24	Ukraine	Roman Chychykalo	3 July 1992 (age 32)	Right Back
26	Serbia	Darko Pavlović	5 June 1981 (age 43)	Left Back
27	Hungary	Barnabás Kerekes	16 September 1998 (age 26)	Left Back
32	Hungary	Péter Ulicsinyi	28 September 1996 (age 28)	Goalkeeper
33	Hungary	Tamás Koller	30 September 1992 (age 32)	Left Back
37	Hungary	Donát Bartók	13 July 1996 (age 28)	Right Back

2015–2016 Team
Shirt No	Nationality	Player	Birth Date	Position
1	Hungary	Norbert Vitáris	1 January 1990 (age 35)	Goalkeeper
3	HungarySerbia	Marko Vasić	19 July 1989 (age 35)	Right Winger
5	Hungary	Dávid Fekete	12 October 1996 (age 28)	Left Winger
6	Montenegro	Milan Popović	23 September 1990 (age 34)	Left Winger
7	Hungary	Attila Joháczi	15 May 1993 (age 31)	Left Back
9	Hungary	Ferenc Császár	8 May 1983 (age 41)	Left Winger
10	Hungary	Mihály Tyiskov	1 November 1990 (age 34)	Line Player
11	Hungary	Péter Lendvay	15 September 1976 (age 48)	Central Back
12	HungarySlovakia	Mihály Tóth	3 September 1992 (age 32)	Goalkeeper
13	Belarus	Aleh Astrashapkin	20 January 1992 (age 33)	Right Back
17	Hungary	Dávid Czene	21 July 1997 (age 27)	Left Back
19	Hungary	Zoltán Terenyi	16 November 1991 (age 33)	Right Winger
20	Belarus	Dzmitry Chystabayeu	23 December 1986 (age 38)	Left Back
21	Hungary	Gergely Pál	18 May 1985 (age 39)	Left Back
23	Hungary	Robin Munkácsi	19 November 1994 (age 30)	Line Player
25	Hungary	Tibor Kökény	25 February 1986 (age 39)	Central Back
26	Serbia	Darko Pavlović	5 June 1981 (age 43)	Left Back
33	Serbia	Nemanja Vucicevic	20 January 1992 (age 33)	Line Player
37	Hungary	Donát Bartók	13 July 1996 (age 28)	Right Back

2012–2013 Team
Shirt No	Nationality	Player	Birth Date	Position
1	Hungary	Norbert Vitáris	1 January 1990 (age 35)	Goalkeeper
2	Hungary	Péter Szikra	28 December 1987 (age 37)	Left Winger
3	Hungary	Ádám Bajorhegyi	17 November 1980 (age 44)	Left Back
5	Hungary	Kristóf Székely	24 September 1992 (age 32)	Central Back
6	Hungary	Péter Simányi	8 April 1989 (age 35)	Right Back
7	Hungary	Balázs Dóra	30 April 1992 (age 32)	Left Back
8	Hungary	Ádám Korsós	28 April 1988 (age 36)	Central Back
9	Hungary	Ferenc Császár	8 May 1983 (age 41)	Left Winger
10	Hungary	Mihály Tyiskov	1 November 1990 (age 34)	Line Player
11	Hungary	Tibor Kökény	25 February 1986 (age 39)	Central Back
12	Hungary	Levente Nagy	16 December 1982 (age 42)	Goalkeeper
13	Hungary	Levente Sipeki	13 August 1993 (age 31)	Left Back
14	Hungary	Gábor Karap	5 March 1993 (age 32)	Right Back
15	Hungary	István Rosta	3 August 1972 (age 52)	Line Player
16	Hungary	Ádám Valkusz	10 January 1992 (age 33)	Goalkeeper
17	Hungary	János Csík	18 September 1981 (age 43)	Left Back
18	Hungary	Renátó Nikolicza	24 July 1989 (age 35)	Left Back
19	Hungary	Tibor Szabó	7 April 1992 (age 32)	Line Player
20	Hungary	Máté Gábori	1 October 1987 (age 37)	Right Winger
21	Hungary	Gergely Pál	18 May 1985 (age 39)	Left Back
23	Hungary	Máté Munkácsi	11 January 1988 (age 37)	Right Winger

== Honours ==
Honours		No.	Years
League
Nemzeti Bajnokság I/B	Winners	3	2011-12, 2014–15, 2018-19
Nemzeti Bajnokság I/B	Runners-up	1	2010-11
Nemzeti Bajnokság I/B	Third Place	1	2009–10

== Recent seasons ==
As of 1 November 2017.

- Seasons in Nemzeti Bajnokság I: 5
- Seasons in Nemzeti Bajnokság I/B: 8
- Seasons in Nemzeti Bajnokság II: 13

Season	Division	Pos.	Magyar kupa
1993-94	NB II Északnyugat	3rd	
1994-95	NB II Észak	2nd	
1995-96	NB II Észak	2nd	
1996-97	NB II Észak	3rd	
1997-98	NB II Észak	3rd	
1998-99	NB II Észak	2nd	
1999-00	NB II Észak	3rd	
2000-01	NB II Észak	6th	
2001-02	NB II Észak	2nd	
2002-03	NB II Észak	1st	

Season	Division	Pos.	Magyar kupa
2003-04	NB I/B Nyugat	12th	
2004-05	NB I/B Kelet	9th	
2005-06	NB I/B Kelet	14th	
2006-07	NB II Észak	3rd	
2007-08	NB II Észak	1st	
2008-09	NB I/B Nyugat	8th	
2009-10	NB I/B Nyugat	3rd	
2010-11	NB I/B Nyugat	2nd	Fourth place
2011-12	NB I/B Nyugat	1st	Round 4
2012-13	NB I	8th	Round 4

Season	Division	Pos.	Magyar kupa
2013-14	NB I	11th	Round 3
2014-15	NB I/B Nyugat	1st	Fourth place
2015-16	NB I	6th	Round 4
2016-17	NB I	10th	Round 4
2017-18	NB I	13th	Round 3
2018-19	NB I/B Nyugat	1st	Round 1
2019-20	NB I	Cancelled	
2020-21	County I		

== EHF Ranking ==
As of 01/10/2021

Rank	Team	Points
341	(Serbia) RK Kolubara	1
342	(Germany) Die Eulen Ludwigshafen	1
343	(Bulgaria) HC Fregata-Burgas	1
344	(Hungary) Váci KSE	1
345	(Czech Republic) HK Lovosice	1
346	(Serbia) RK Vrbas	1
347	(England) Warrington Wolves HC	1

== Former club members ==
=== Notable former players ===
- (Hungary) Ádám Bajorhegyi
- (Hungary) Donát Bartók
- (Hungary) Dávid Fekete
- (Hungary) (Russia) Szergej Kuzmicsov
- (Hungary) Péter Lendvay
- (Hungary) István Rosta
- (Hungary) (Slovakia) Mihály Tóth
- (Hungary) (Serbia) Marko Vasić
- (Hungary) Norbert Vitáris
- (Bosnia and Herzegovina) Marko Davidovic
- (Belarus) Aleh Astrashapkin
- (Belarus) Dzmitry Chystabayeu
- (Croatia) Ante Grbavac
- (Croatia) Marin Sakić
- (Croatia) (Hungary) Petar Topic (2016-2017)
- (Montenegro) Milan Popović
- (Serbia) Jožef Holpert
- (Serbia) Darko Pavlović
- (Serbia) Aleksandar Stanojević
- (Serbia) Nemanja Vucicevic
- (Slovakia) Teodor Paul
- (Tunisia) Idriss Drissi
- (Ukraine) Roman Chychykalo
