= Budakalász =

- Town
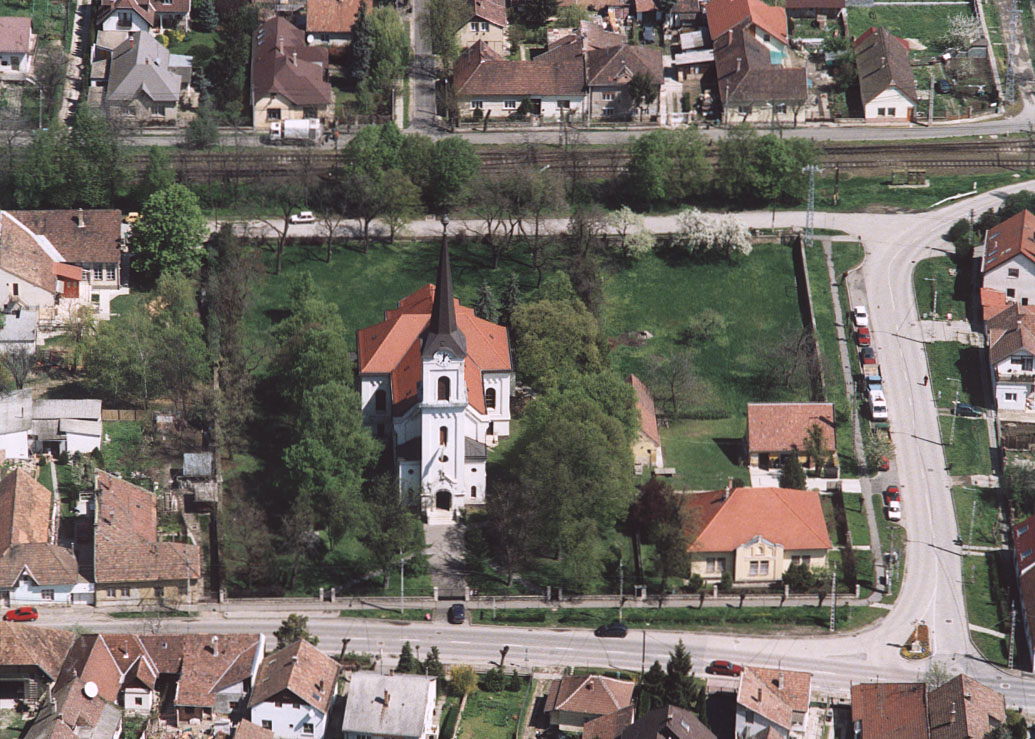
- Roman Catholic Church

- Flag Coat of arms

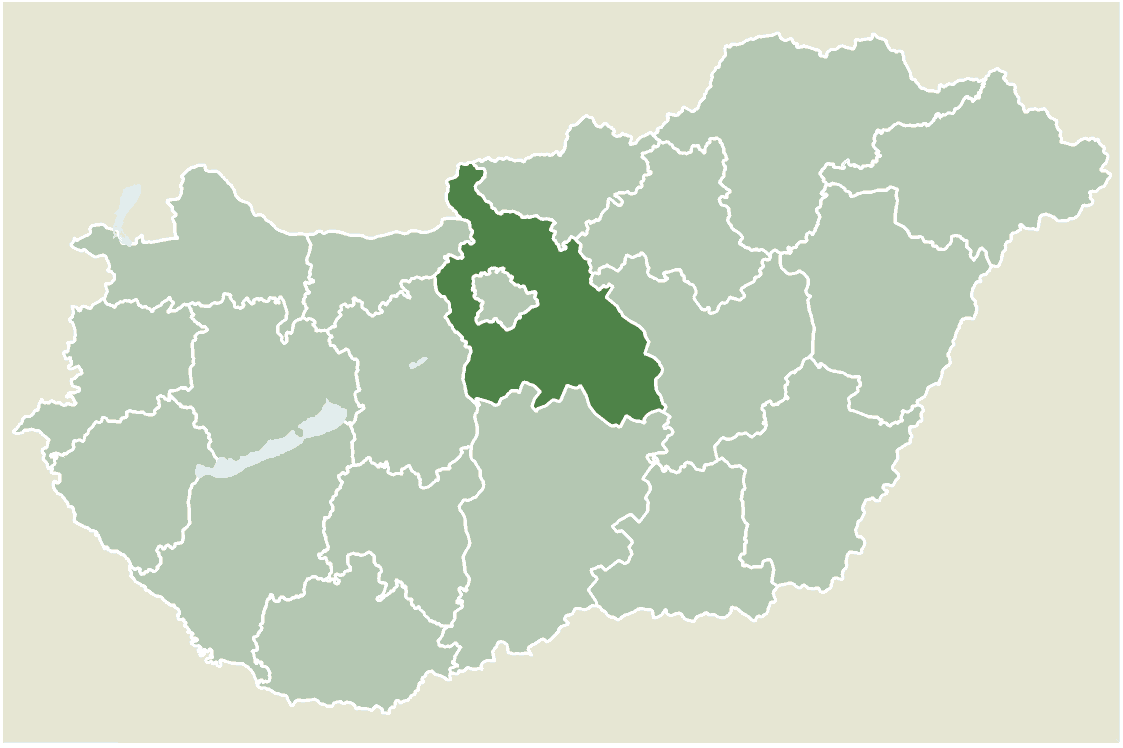
- Location of Pest county in Hungary

- Location of Budakalász
- Coordinates: 47.62153°N 19.04596°E
- Country: Hungary
- County: Pest
- District: Szentendre

Area
  - Total: 15.17 km^{2} (5.86 sq mi)

Population (2015)
  - Total: 10,660
  - Density: 629.19/km^{2} (1,629.6/sq mi)
- Time zone: UTC+1 (CET)
  - Summer (DST): UTC+2 (CEST)
- Postal code: 2011
- Area code: (+36) 26
- Website: www.budakalasz.hu

Budakalász is a town in the Budapest metropolitan area, Hungary.

== Twin towns – sister cities ==
Budakalász is twinned with:

- Ada, Serbia
- Kahl am Main, Germany
- Lueta, Romania
