= Imre Földi Sports Hall =

Multi-use indoor arena in Tatabánya, Hungary

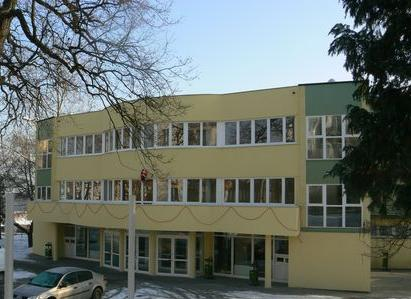
- Interactive map of Imre Földi Sports Hall
- Location: 9 Ságvári Street; Tatabánya, Hungary; 2800
- Coordinates: 47°33′27″N 18°25′0″E
- Owner: Sport Nonprofit Ltd.
- Operator: Sport Nonprofit Ltd.
- Capacity: 1,000 (Handball); 1,250 (Concerts)
- Type: Indoor arena
- Surface: Parquet
- Field size: 40 x 20 m

Construction
- Built: 1976
- Renovated: 2009

Tenant
- Tatabánya KC

The Imre Földi Sports Hall (Hungarian: Földi Imre Sportcsarnok) is a multi-use indoor arena in Tatabánya, Hungary.

The home of Hungarian top division handball club Tatabánya KC, it can accommodate up to 1,000 spectators in handball matches. Due to its dimensions, the sports hall is suitable for a number of other indoor sports as well as exhibitions and concerts.

Built in 1976, the arena went through a refurbishment in 2009 at a cost of 212 million Hungarian Forint (approximately US$900,000). In the project the weightlifting hall has been expanded and a new 280 square meter warm-up room was created. On the top of the weightlifting hall a 255 square metre training hall for the wrestling department was constructed while judo competitors got a 220 square meter practice room on the top floor.

Since March 2009 the sports hall bears the name of local Olympic champion weightlifter Imre Földi.
