= 2022–23 Csurgói KK season =

Csurgói KK
2022–23 season
- President: Dr. János Varga
- Head coach: (Hungary) Norbert Baranyai
- Nemzeti Bajnokság I: -
- Hungarian Cup: Pre-season
Home colours	Away colours
- All statistics correct as of 5 September 2022.

The 2022–23 season was the 29th season in the history of Csurgói KK and their 15th consecutive season in the top flight. The club will participate in Nemzeti Bajnokság I and the Magyar Kupa.

== Players ==
=== Squad information ===
Squad for the 2022–23 season.
As of 5 September 2022

Goalkeepers

- 12 (Hungary) Balázs Holló
- 16 (Hungary) Ádám Füstös
- 45 (Hungary) Tamás Konyicsák

Left Wingers

- 2 (Croatia) Tomislav Špruk
- 6 (Hungary) Gergely Bazsó

Right Wingers

- 17 (Hungary) Ádám Tóth
- 25 (Hungary) Ádám Gebhardt

Line Players

- 3 (Hungary) László Szeitl
- 18 (Hungary) Erik Szeitl
- 27 (Croatia) Matko Rotim

Left Backs

- 10 (Bosnia and Herzegovina) Mirko Herceg
- 15 (Hungary) Tamás Borsos
- 20 (Hungary) Marcell Gábor
- 24 (Hungary) Ádám Vasvári

Central Backs

- 11 (Serbia) Mladen Krsmančić
- 13 (Slovenia) Rok Skol
- 65 (Hungary) Péter Horváth

Right Backs

- 9 (Slovenia) Grega Krečič
- 77 (Serbia) Mitar Markez

=== Transfers ===
Source: Rajt a K&H férfi ligában

IN

- (Hungary) Balázs Holló (from (Hungary) Dabas)
- (Serbia) Mitar Markez (from (Hungary) Gyöngyös)
- (Slovenia) Rok Skol (from (Austria) HSG Graz)
- (Croatia) Tomislav Špruk (from (Slovenia) Koper)

OUT

- (Hungary) Péter Ács (loan to (Hungary) NEKA)
- (Hungary) Marcell Breuer (loan to (Hungary) Ajka)
- (Hungary) Gyula Kerkovits (to (Hungary) Százhalombatta)
- (Croatia) Antonio Kovačević (?)
- (Croatia) Bruno Kozina (to (Switzerland) HSC Kreuzlingen)
- (Hungary) Péter Tatai (to (Hungary) Tatai AC)
- (Hungary) Zsolt Schäffer (to (Hungary) Gyöngyös)

=== Staff members ===
Source: Staff - Adatok, Szakmai stáb 2022-2023

- Head Coach: Norbert Baranyai
- Assistant and Youth Coach: (Serbia) Darko Pavlović
- Goalkeeping Coach: Imre Szabó
- Fitness Coach: Levente Bakai
- Club Doctor: Mária Dergez MD
- Masseur: Ferenc Gazda

== Club ==
=== Management ===
Source: Management (Klubvezetés)

Position	Staff member
President	Dr. János Varga
Executive director	Péter Erdélyi
Member Of The Board	Dániel Varga
Technical director	Árpád Szabados

=== Uniform ===
- Supplier: hummel
- Shirt sponsor (front): tippmix / PriMont / MenDan**** / KLH Masters / Csurgó
- Shirt sponsor (back): Patrik & Varga Gazdasági tanácsadó Zrt. / Dráva-Coop Zrt.
- Shorts sponsor: PriMont / KLH Masters / www.cskk.hu

== Competitions ==
Times up to 30 October 2022 and from 26 March 2023 are CEST (UTC+2). Times from 30 October 2022 to 26 March 2023 are CET (UTC+1).

Win Draw Loss

=== Overview ===
Competition	First match	Last match	Starting round	Final position	Record							
Competition	First match	Last match	Starting round	Final position	Pld	W	D	L	GF	GA	GD	Win %
Nemzeti Bajnokság I	3 September 2022	-	Matchday 1	-	3	2	0	1	85	80	+5	66.67
Magyar Kupa	-	-	Fourth round	-	0	0	0	0	0	0	+0	—
Total					3	2	0	1	85	80	+5	66.67

Last updated: 11 September 2022
Source: Flashscore

=== Nemzeti Bajnokság I ===
==== Regular season ====
===== Results by round =====
Round	1	2	3	4	5	6	7	8	9	10	11	12	13	14	15	16	17	18	19	20	21	22	23	24	25	26
Ground	A	H	A	A	H	H	H	A	H	A	H	A	A	H	A	H	H	A	H	A	A	A	H	A	H	H
Result	W	W	L	D	W																					

Updated to match(es) played on 11 September 2022. Source: Matches
A = Away; H = Home; W = Win; D = Draw; L = Loss; C = Cancelled

===== Matches =====
The league fixtures were announced on 5 July 2022.

Round 1; 3 September 2022; 19:00	HSA-NEKA	23–28	Csurgói KK	NEKA Sportcsarnok, Balatonboglár; Attendance: 200; Referees: Bócz, Wiedemann
Round 1; 3 September 2022; 19:00	Szilágyi 7	(11–12)	Krsmančić 5	NEKA Sportcsarnok, Balatonboglár; Attendance: 200; Referees: Bócz, Wiedemann
Round 1; 3 September 2022; 19:00	1× (yellow card) 6× (suspension)	Report	1× (yellow card) 5× (suspension) 1× (red card)	NEKA Sportcsarnok, Balatonboglár; Attendance: 200; Referees: Bócz, Wiedemann

Round 2; 10 September 2022; 18:00	Csurgói KK	32–29	Budai Farkasok-Rév Group	Sótonyi László Sportcsarnok, Csurgó; Attendance: 600; Referees: Altmár, Horváth
Round 2; 10 September 2022; 18:00	Markez 11	(15–14)	Németh 7	Sótonyi László Sportcsarnok, Csurgó; Attendance: 600; Referees: Altmár, Horváth
Round 2; 10 September 2022; 18:00	5× (suspension)	Report	4× (suspension)	Sótonyi László Sportcsarnok, Csurgó; Attendance: 600; Referees: Altmár, Horváth

Round 3; 16 September 2022; 18:30	MOL Tatabánya KC	28–25	Csurgói KK	Multifunkcionális Sportcsarnok, Tatabánya; Attendance: 2,160; Referees: G. Kiu, T. Kiu
Round 3; 16 September 2022; 18:30	Pedro 8	(14–12)	Gábor 6	Multifunkcionális Sportcsarnok, Tatabánya; Attendance: 2,160; Referees: G. Kiu, T. Kiu
Round 3; 16 September 2022; 18:30	1× (yellow card) 4× (suspension)	Report	1× (yellow card) 4× (suspension) 1× (red card)	Multifunkcionális Sportcsarnok, Tatabánya; Attendance: 2,160; Referees: G. Kiu, T. Kiu

Round 4; 24 September 2022; 18:00	Sport36-Komló	25–25	Csurgói KK	Sportközpont, Komló; Attendance: 600; Referees: Felhő, Öcsi
Round 4; 24 September 2022; 18:00	Melnicsuk 9	(15–14)	Herceg 5	Sportközpont, Komló; Attendance: 600; Referees: Felhő, Öcsi
Round 4; 24 September 2022; 18:00	1× (yellow card) 6× (suspension)	Report	2× (yellow card) 8× (suspension)	Sportközpont, Komló; Attendance: 600; Referees: Felhő, Öcsi

Round 5; 1 October 2022; 18:00	Csurgói KK	30–27	CYEB-Budakalász	Sótonyi László Sportcsarnok, Csurgó; Attendance: 700; Referees: Bóna, Földesi
Round 5; 1 October 2022; 18:00	Krsmančić 7	(13–11)	Sinkovits 10	Sótonyi László Sportcsarnok, Csurgó; Attendance: 700; Referees: Bóna, Földesi
Round 5; 1 October 2022; 18:00	1× (yellow card) 6× (suspension)	Report	1× (yellow card) 4× (suspension)	Sótonyi László Sportcsarnok, Csurgó; Attendance: 700; Referees: Bóna, Földesi

Round 6; 22 October 2022; 18:00	Csurgói KK	–	HÉP-Cegléd	Sótonyi László Sportcsarnok, Csurgó
Round 6; 22 October 2022; 18:00		(–)		Sótonyi László Sportcsarnok, Csurgó
Round 6; 22 October 2022; 18:00		Report		Sótonyi László Sportcsarnok, Csurgó

Round 7; 29 October 2022; 18:00	Csurgói KK	–	Balatonfüredi KSE	Sótonyi László Sportcsarnok, Csurgó
Round 7; 29 October 2022; 18:00		(–)		Sótonyi László Sportcsarnok, Csurgó
Round 7; 29 October 2022; 18:00		Report		Sótonyi László Sportcsarnok, Csurgó

Round 8; 5 November 2022; 18:00	Dabas KC	–	Csurgói KK	OBO Aréna, Dabas
Round 8; 5 November 2022; 18:00		(–)		OBO Aréna, Dabas
Round 8; 5 November 2022; 18:00		Report		OBO Aréna, Dabas

Round 9; 12 November 2022; 18:00	Csurgói KK	–	Ferencvárosi TC	Sótonyi László Sportcsarnok, Csurgó
Round 9; 12 November 2022; 18:00		(–)		Sótonyi László Sportcsarnok, Csurgó
Round 9; 12 November 2022; 18:00		Report		Sótonyi László Sportcsarnok, Csurgó

Round 10; 26 November 2022; 18:00	Telekom Veszprém	–	Csurgói KK	Veszprém Aréna, Veszprém
Round 10; 26 November 2022; 18:00		(–)		Veszprém Aréna, Veszprém
Round 10; 26 November 2022; 18:00		Report		Veszprém Aréna, Veszprém

Round 11; 3 December 2022; 18:00	Csurgói KK	–	HE-DO B. Braun Gyöngyös	Sótonyi László Sportcsarnok, Csurgó
Round 11; 3 December 2022; 18:00		(–)		Sótonyi László Sportcsarnok, Csurgó
Round 11; 3 December 2022; 18:00		Report		Sótonyi László Sportcsarnok, Csurgó

Round 12; 10 December 2022; 17:00	Pick Szeged	–	Csurgói KK	Pick Aréna, Szeged
Round 12; 10 December 2022; 17:00		(–)		Pick Aréna, Szeged
Round 12; 10 December 2022; 17:00		Report		Pick Aréna, Szeged

Round 13; 17 December 2022; 18:00	Fejér-B.Á.L. Veszprém	–	Csurgói KK	Városi Sportcsarnok, Veszprém
Round 13; 17 December 2022; 18:00		(–)		Városi Sportcsarnok, Veszprém
Round 13; 17 December 2022; 18:00		Report		Városi Sportcsarnok, Veszprém

===== Results overview =====
Opposition	Home score	Away score	Double
Balatonfüredi KSE	29 Oct	17 Mar	-
Budai Farkasok-Rév Group	32–29	17 Feb	-
CYEB-Budakalász	30–27	18 Mar	-
HÉP-Cegléd	22 Oct	14 Apr	-
Dabas KK	25 Mar	5 Nov	-
Ferencvárosi TC	12 Nov	21 Apr	-
HE-DO B. Braun Gyöngyös	3 Dec	13 May	-
Sport36-Komló	4 Mar	25–25	-
HSA-NEKA	11 Feb	23–28	-
Pick Szeged	21 May	10 Dec	-
MOL Tatabánya KC	25 Feb	28–25	-
Telekom Veszprém	6 May	26 Nov	-
Fejér-B.Á.L. Veszprém	27 May	17 Dec	-

=== Magyar Kupa ===
Csurgó entered the tournament in the fourth round.

== Statistics ==
=== Top scorers ===
Includes all competitive matches. The list is sorted by shirt number when total goals are equal. Last updated on 18 September 2022.

Position	Nation	No.	Name	Hungarian League	Hungarian Cup	Total
1	(Serbia)	77	Mitar Markez	16	0	16
2	(Hungary)	20	Marcell Gábor	11	0	11
3	(Slovenia)	9	Grega Krečič	10	0	10
4	(Bosnia and Herzegovina)	10	Mirko Herceg	10	0	10
5	(Croatia)	27	Matko Rotim	9	0	9
6	(Serbia)	11	Mladen Krsmančić	8	0	8
7	(Hungary)	17	Ádám Tóth	5	0	5
8	(Hungary)	6	Gergely Bazsó	4	0	4
9	(Hungary)	3	László Szeitl	4	0	4
10	(Slovenia)	13	Rok Skol	3	0	3
11	(Hungary)	15	Tamás Borsos	2	0	2
12	(Hungary)	25	Ádám Gebhardt	2	0	2
13	(Hungary)	12	Balázs Holló	1	0	1
			TOTALS	85	0	85
