= Csurgói KK =

Hungarian handball club

- Full name: Csurgói Kézilabda Klub
- Short name: CSKK, Csurgó
- Founded: 1992; 34 years ago
- Arena: Sótonyi László Sportcsarnok, Csurgó
- Capacity: 1,200 seats
- President: Dr. János Varga
- Head coach: Alem Toskić
- Captain: Ádám Vasvári
- League: Nemzeti Bajnokság I
- 2022–23: Nemzeti Bajnokság I, 6th of 14
- Club colours
Home	Away

Csurgói Kézilabda Klub is a Hungarian handball club from Csurgó, that plays in the Nemzeti Bajnokság I, the top level championship in Hungary.

Location of Csurgói KK

== Crest, colours, supporters ==
=== Naming history ===
Name	Period
Csurgói KK	−1996
Csurgói FKK	1996–1997
Csurgói KSK	1997–2001
Csurgói KK	2001-present

=== Kit manufacturers ===
Period	Kit manufacturer
–2010	(Germany) Jako
2010–2012	(Germany) Erima
2012–2023	(Denmark) Hummel
2023–present	(Italy) Kappa

=== Kits ===
HOME
2015–16	2016–17	2017–19	2019–21	2021–23

AWAY
2013–15	2015–16	2016–17	2017–19	2019–21	2021–23	2023-24

THIRD
2009–10	2013–15	2015–16

== Sports Hall information ==
- Name: – Sótonyi László Sportcsarnok
- City: – Csurgó
- Capacity: – 1200
- Address: – 8840 Csurgó, Sárgáti utca 18.

== Management ==
Position	Name
President	(Hungary) Dr. János Varga
Executive Director	(Hungary) Péter Erdélyi
Member Of The Board	(Hungary) Dr. Péter Győri
Technical manager	(Hungary) Árpád Szabados

== Team ==
=== Current squad ===
Squad for the 2026–27 season

Csurgói KK

Goalkeepers

- 32 (Slovenia) Rok Zaponšek
- 36 (Hungary) Roland Széll
- 61 (Hungary) Dániel Váczi

Left Wingers

- 6 (Hungary) Gergely Bazsó
- 17 (Serbia) Filip Milovanović
- 42 (Hungary) Bálint Füstös

Right Wingers

- 30 (Hungary) Balázs Máté Szűcs
- 34 (Hungary) Balázs Szűcs

Line Players

- 8 (Hungary) Bulcsú Németh
- 25 (Serbia) Nemanja Ratković
- 77 (Serbia) Ilija Bogdanović

Central Backs

- 4 (Bosnia and Herzegovina) Domagoj Alilović
- 33 (Hungary) Bence Kiss
- 65 (Hungary) Péter Horváth

Left Backs

- 10 (Bosnia and Herzegovina) Mirko Herceg
- 20 (Hungary) Marcell Gábor
- 24 (Hungary) Ádám Vasvári
- 47 (Slovenia) Aleks Kavčič

Right Backs

- 22 (Hungary) Sándor Kathi
- 23 (Serbia) Vojislav Brajović

=== Technical staff ===
- Head coach: (Serbia) Alem Toskić
- Assistant coach: (Serbia) Darko Pavlović
- Goalkeeping coach: (Hungary) Imre Szabó
- Fitness Coach: (Hungary) Balázs Kincse
- Masseur: (Hungary) Ferenc Gazda
- Club doctor: (Hungary) Dr. Mária Dergez

=== Transfers ===
Transfers for the 2026–27 season

Joining

- (Slovenia) Aleks Kavčič (LB) from (Croatia) RK Zagreb
- (Serbia) Ilija Bogdanović (LP) from (Serbia) RK Dinamo Pančevo
- (Serbia) Filip Milovanović (LW) from (Serbia) RK Metaloplastika
- (Hungary) Sándor Kathi (RB) from (Hungary) NEKA
- (Hungary) Balázs Szűcs (RW) from (Hungary) NEKA

Leaving

- (Slovenia) Urban Pipp (RB) to (Slovenia) RD Slovan
- (Croatia) Matko Rotim (LP)
- (Hungary) Zalán Maracskó (RW) to (Hungary) NEKA

Transfers for the 2025–26 season

Joining

- (Bosnia and Herzegovina) Vladimir Vranješ (LP) from (Germany) HSG Wetzlar
- (Bosnia and Herzegovina) Domagoj Alilović (CB) from (Serbia) RK Metaloplastika
- (Slovenia) Rok Zaponšek (GK) from (Slovenia) RD Slovan
- (Slovenia) Urban Pipp (RB) from (Slovenia) RK Gorenje Velenje
- (Croatia) Matko Rotim (LP) from (Hungary) Carbonex-Komló
- (Hungary) Dániel Váczi (GK) from (Hungary) Budakalász FKC
- (Hungary) Zalán Maracskó (RW) from (Hungary) QHB-Eger
- (Hungary) Bulcsú Németh (LP) from (Hungary) OTP Bank - Pick Szeged U21
- (Hungary) Balázs Szűcs (RW) on loan from (Hungary) OTP Bank - Pick Szeged U21
- (Hungary) Péter Horváth (CB) back from loan at (Hungary) BFKA-Veszprém
- (Serbia) Nemanja Ratković (LP) from (Serbia) RK Partizan

Leaving

- (Serbia) Aleksa Tufegdžić (RW) to (Croatia) RK Zagreb
- (Bosnia and Herzegovina) Marko Majstorović (LW) to (Slovenia) RK Trimo Trebnje
- (Slovenia) Matevž Žagar (CB) to (Slovenia) MRK Krka
- (Czech Republic) David Mazurek (RB) to (Czech Republic) SKKP Handball Brno
- (Slovenia) Urh Brana (GK)
- (Hungary) Erik Szeitl (LP) to (France) Cesson Rennes MHB
- (Hungary) Tamás Papp (LP) to (Hungary) MOL Tatabánya KC
- (Hungary) Péter Tóth (RB) to (Hungary) Ferencvárosi TC
- (Hungary) Ádám Füstös (GK) to (Hungary) Balatonfüredi KSE
- (Hungary) Balázs Holló (GK) to (Hungary) Szigetszentmiklósi KSK
- (Bosnia and Herzegovina) Vladimir Vranješ (LP)

Transfers for the 2024–25 season

Joining

- (Serbia) Vojislav Brajović (RB) from (Serbia) RK Metaloplastika
- (Bosnia and Herzegovina) Marko Majstorović (LW) from (Slovenia) MRK Krka
- (Hungary) Bence Kiss (CB) from (Hungary) Budakalász FKC
- (Hungary) Roland Széll (GK) from (Hungary) Dabas KK
- (Hungary) Gellért Fekete (LP) on loan from (Hungary) OTP Bank - Pick Szeged U21
- (Slovenia) Urh Brana (GK) from (Austria) BT Füchse

Leaving

- (Serbia) Mitar Markez (RB) to (Hungary) Gyöngyösi KK
- (Serbia) Mladen Krsmančić (CB) to (North Macedonia) RK Vardar
- (Croatia) Tomislav Špruk (LW)
- (Hungary) Tamás Borsos (LB) to (Hungary) Carbonex-Komló
- (Hungary) Ádám Gebhardt (RW) to (Hungary) Várpalotai BSK
- (Hungary) Marcell Breuer (LP) to (Hungary) Békési FKC
- (Croatia) Bruno-Vili Zobec (RB) loan back to (Hungary) PLER-Budapest
- (Hungary) Milán Benkő (GK) on loan at (Hungary) KK Ajka
- (Hungary) Péter Horváth (CB) on loan at (Hungary) BFKA-Veszprém
- (Hungary) Gellért Fekete (LP) loan back to (Hungary) OTP Bank - Pick Szeged U21

Transfers for the 2023–24 season

Joining

- (Serbia) Aleksa Tufegdžić (RW) from (Slovenia) RD Slovan
- (Slovenia) Matevž Žagar (CB) from (Slovenia) RK Koper
- (Czech Republic) David Mazurek (RB) from (Czech Republic) HC Zubří
- (Hungary) Tamás Papp (LP) from (Hungary) NEKA
- (Hungary) Péter Tóth (RW) from (Hungary) Fejér B.Á.L. Veszprém
- (Croatia) Bruno-Vili Zobec (RB) on loan from (Hungary) PLER-Budapest

Leaving

- (Slovenia) Grega Krečič (RB) to (Slovenia) RK Celje
- (Slovenia) Rok Skol (CB) to (Slovenia) RD Ribnica
- (Croatia) Matko Rotim (LP) to (Hungary) Sport36-Komló
- (Hungary) Ádám Tóth (RW) to (Hungary) PLER-Budapest
- (Hungary) László Szeitl (LP) to (Hungary) Budai Farkasok KKUK
- (Hungary) Tamás Konyicsák (GK) to (Hungary) Ózdi KC
- (Serbia) Mitar Markez (RB) on loan at (Hungary) PLER-Budapest

Transfers for the 2022–23 season

Joining

- (Serbia) Mitar Markez (RB) from (Hungary) Gyöngyösi KK
- (Slovenia) Rok Skol (CB) from (Austria) HSG Graz
- (Hungary) Balázs Holló (GK) from (Hungary) Dabas KK
- (Croatia) Tomislav Špruk (LW) from (Slovenia) RK Koper

Leaving

- (Hungary) Péter Tatai (GK) to (Hungary) Tatai AC
- (Hungary) Zsolt Schäffer (RB) to (Hungary) Gyöngyösi KK
- (Croatia) Bruno Kozina (CB) to (Switzerland) HSC Kreuzlingen
- (Hungary) Gyula Kerkovits (LW) to (Hungary) Százhalombattai KE
- (Croatia) Antonio Kovačević (LW)
- (Hungary) Péter Ács (RB) on loan at (Hungary) NEKA
- (Hungary) Marcell Breuer (LP) on loan at (Hungary) KK Ajka
- (Hungary) Tamás Konyicsák (GK) on loan at (Hungary) KK Ajka

Transfers for the 2021–22 season

Joining

- (Hungary) Zsolt Schäffer (RB) from (Hungary) Ferencvárosi TC
- (Bosnia and Herzegovina) Mirko Herceg (LB) from (Hungary) Gyöngyösi KK
- (Croatia) Matko Rotim (LP) from (Hungary) Budakalász FKC
- (Hungary) Ádám Tóth (RW) from (Hungary) Dabas KK
- (Hungary) Károly Juhász (CB) from (Hungary) Ceglédi KKSE
- (Croatia) Bruno Kozina (CB) from (Spain) BM Puerto Sagunto
- (Hungary) Tamás Konyicsák (GK) from (Hungary) NEKA
- (Hungary) Marcell Breuer (LP) from (Hungary) BFKA-Balatonfüred U22
- (Hungary) László Szeitl (LP) from (Hungary) NEKA

Leaving

- (Hungary) Egon Hanusz (CB) to (Germany) TVB 1898 Stuttgart
- (Hungary) (Serbia) Marko Vasić (RW) to (Hungary) Gyöngyösi KK
- (Serbia) Ivan Popović (LP) to (France) Cavigal Nice HB
- (Hungary) Péter Pallag (GK) on loan at (Hungary) Dabas KK
- (Hungary) Péter Ács (RB) on loan at (Hungary) Ceglédi KKSE
- (Hungary) Szabolcs Nagy (LB) to (Hungary) Budai Farkasok KKUK
- (Hungary) Károly Juhász (CB) to (Hungary) Ceglédi KKSE

Transfers for the 2020–21 season

Joining

- (Hungary) Péter Tatai (GK) from (Germany) TuS Nettelstedt-Lübbecke
- (Hungary) Marcell Gábor (LB) from (Hungary) Budakalász FKC
- (Serbia) Mladen Krsmančić (CB) from (Spain) SCDR Anaitasuna
- (Slovenia) Grega Krečič (RB) from (Slovenia) RK Koper
- (Serbia) Ivan Popović (LP) from (Spain) BM Granollers

Leaving

- (Slovenia) Rok Zaponšek (GK) to (France) Cesson Rennes MHB
- (Slovenia) Klemen Cehte (LB) to (Austria) HSG Bärnbach/Köflach
- (Slovenia) Gregor Potočnik (LB) to (Slovenia) RK Trimo Trebnje
- (Slovenia) Borut Oslak (CB) to (Slovenia) RK Prevent Slovenj Gradec
- (Bosnia and Herzegovina) Marko Tarabochia (CB) to (North Macedonia) RK Metalurg Skopje
- (Belarus) Aleh Astrashapkin (RB) to (Russia) CSKA Moscow
- (Bosnia and Herzegovina) Gafar Hadžiomerović (LP) to (Israel) Maccabi Rishon LeZion
- (Serbia) Alem Toskic (LP) (retires)
- (Hungary) Csaba Leimeter (RB) to (Croatia) RK Zagreb

Transfers for the 2019–20 season

Joining

- (Hungary) Ádám Gebhardt (RW) from (Hungary) Sport36-Komló
- (Hungary) Csaba Leimeter (RB) from (Hungary) Budakalász FKC
- (Hungary) Péter Pallag (GK) from (Hungary) Dabas KK
- (Slovenia) Gregor Potočnik (LB) from (Croatia) RK Zagreb
- (Hungary) Tamás Borsos (LB) from (Hungary) Dabas KK
- (Bosnia and Herzegovina) Marko Tarabochia (CB) from (Croatia) MRK Sesvete

Leaving

- (Hungary) Tibor Balogh (GK) to (Hungary) Dabas KK
- (Hungary) Tamás Farkas (LB) to (Hungary) PLER KC
- (Hungary) Martin Varjú (RW) to (Hungary) Mezőkövesdi KC
- (Serbia) Darko Pavlović (LB) (retires)

Transfers for the 2018–19 season

Joining

- (Belarus) Aleh Astrashapkin (RB) from (Belarus) HC Meshkov Brest
- (Hungary) Tamás Farkas (LB) from (Hungary) PLER KC
- (Hungary) Szabolcs Nagy (LB) from (Hungary) PLER KC
- (Hungary) Gyula Kerkovits (LW) from (Hungary) NEKA
- (Serbia) Alem Toskic (LP) from (Slovenia) Gorenje Velenje
- (Slovenia) Rok Zaponšek (GK) from (Slovenia) Gorenje Velenje

Leaving

- (Hungary) Ákos Balogh (GK) to (Hungary) Tungsram SE Nagykanizsa
- (Hungary) Tibor Gazdag (LW) to (Hungary) Tungsram SE Nagykanizsa
- (Hungary) László Bartucz (GK) to (Hungary) Grundfos Tatabánya KC
- (Brazil) Uelington da Silva (LB) to (Hungary) Balatonfüredi KSE
- (Hungary) Áron Géczi (LP) to (Hungary) Budai Farkasok KKUK
- (Serbia) Ljubomir Jošić (RB) to (Israel) HC Ramat HaSharon
- (Romania) (Hungary) Iulian Ernest Jerebie (LP) to (Slovenia) RK Maribor Branik
- (Hungary) (Serbia) Sztefán Manojlovity (CB) to (Hungary) Sport36-Komló
- (Hungary) Attila Tóth (RB) to (Hungary) Veszprém KKFT Felsőörs

Transfers for the 2017–18 season

Joining

- (Hungary) (Serbia) Marko Vasić (RW) from (Hungary) Váci KSE
- (Brazil) Malandrin De Oliveira Rodolfo (RB) from (Hungary) Gyöngyösi KK
- (Brazil) Uelington da Silva (LB) from (Portugal) Benfica
- (Hungary) Attila Tóth (RB) from (Hungary) Telekom Veszprém
- (Hungary) Erik Szeitl (LP) from (Hungary) Telekom Veszprém
- (Hungary) Ádám Vasvári (LB) from (Hungary) Balatonfüredi KSE
- (Slovenia) Klemen Cehte (LB) from (United Arab Emirates) Al Shabab SC
- (Serbia) Ljubomir Jošić (RB) from (Spain) BM Puente Genil
- (Croatia) Antonio Kovačević (LW) from (Romania) Székelyudvarhelyi KC
- (Serbia) Darko Pavlović (LB) from (Hungary) Balmazújvárosi KK

Leaving

- (Belarus) Aleh Astrashapkin (RB) loan back to (Belarus) HC Meshkov Brest
- (Hungary) Rudolf Faluvégi (LB) to (France) HBC Nantes
- (Hungary) Bálint Pordán (LP) to (Hungary) Ferencvárosi TC
- (Hungary) Levente Halász (LB) to (Hungary) Dabas KK
- (Croatia) Josip Pazin (RB) to (Norway) Kolstad Håndball
- (Hungary) Péter Hornyák (RW) to (Hungary) Balatonfüredi KSE
- (Portugal) Alvaro Rodrigues (LP) to (Spain) Viveros Herol Nava
- (Hungary) István Mátó (LP) loan back to (Hungary) Balatonfüredi KSE
- (Brazil) Malandrin De Oliveira Rodolfo (RB) to (Hungary) Gyöngyösi KK
- (Slovakia) Jakub Mikita (LB) to (France) Cesson Rennes MHB

Transfers for the 2016–17 season

Joining

- (Slovenia) Borut Oslak (CB) from (France) Chartres MHB
- (Hungary) Levente Halász (LB) from (Spain) BM Guadalajara
- (Belarus) Aleh Astrashapkin (RB) on loan from (Belarus) HC Meshkov Brest
- (Hungary) Martin Varjú (RW) from (Hungary) Telekom Veszprém
- (Portugal) Alvaro Rodrigues (LP) from (Spain) ARS Palma del Río
- (Hungary) István Mátó (LP) on loan from (Hungary) Balatonfüredi KSE
- (Croatia) Josip Pazin (RB) from (Hungary) Sport36-Komló

Leaving

- (Hungary) Márton Székely (GK) to (Hungary) Grundfos Tatabánya KC
- (Portugal) Filipe Mota (CB) to (Spain) Helvetia Anaitasuna
- (Hungary) Gábor Herbert (LP) to (Hungary) FKSE Algyő
- (North Macedonia) Darko Dimitrievski (LB) to (North Macedonia) RK Metalurg Skopje
- (Croatia) Josip Pazin (RB) to (Hungary) Sport36-Komló
- (Hungary) Ádám Gebhardt (RW) to (Hungary) Sport36-Komló
- (Hungary) Szabolcs Szkokán (RW) to (Hungary) Sport36-Komló
- (Hungary) Máté Nagy (LW) to (Hungary) Ferencvárosi TC
- (Slovakia) Gabriel Vadkerti (CB) to (Slovakia) HKM Sala
- (Montenegro) Stefan Čavor (RB) to (Germany) HSG Wetzlar

Transfers for the 2015–16 season

Joining

- (Hungary) Márton Székely (GK) from (Hungary) Balatonfüredi KSE
- (Hungary) Rudolf Faluvégi (LB) from (Hungary) Balatonfüredi KSE
- (Hungary) László Bartucz (GK) from (Hungary) Ceglédi KKSE
- (Hungary) Péter Hornyák (RW) from (Germany) TUSEM Essen
- (Croatia) Josip Pazin (RB) from (Spain) BM Villa de Aranda
- (North Macedonia) Darko Dimitrievski (LB) from (Spain) CB Ademar León
- (Portugal) Filipe Mota (CB) from (Romania) CS Energia Targu-Jiu
- (Slovakia) Jakub Mikita (LB) from (Hungary) PLER KC
- (Bosnia and Herzegovina) Gafar Hadžiomerović (LP) from (Hungary) Sport36-Komló

Leaving

- (Montenegro) Rade Mijatović (GK) to (Hungary) Grundfos Tatabánya KC
- (Hungary) Ákos Lele (LB) to (Hungary) Grundfos Tatabánya KC
- (Hungary) Szabolcs Szöllősi (LP) to (Hungary) Grundfos Tatabánya KC
- (Belarus) Barys Pukhouski (CB) to (Ukraine) Motor Zaporizhzhia
- (Ukraine) Vladyslav Ostroushko (LB) to (Romania) Minaur Baia Mare
- (Slovenia) Anže Ratajec (CB) to (Slovenia) Gorenje Velenje
- (Hungary) Gábor Oláh (RB) to (Hungary) Balmazújvárosi KK
- (Hungary) Tamás Borsos (LB) to (Hungary) Ceglédi KKSE
- (Hungary) Péter Megyeri (RW) to (Hungary) Ceglédi KKSE
- (Hungary) Péter Kovacsics (LW) to (Hungary) Gyöngyösi KK
- (Hungary) Péter Pallag (GK) to (Romania) ASC Potaissa Turda
- (Serbia) Bojan Rađenović (LW) on loan at (Hungary) PLER KC
- (Hungary) Attila Füstös (LB) on loan at (Hungary) Mezőkövesdi KC
- (Hungary) Tibor Balogh (GK) on loan at (Hungary) Mezőkövesdi KC
- (Hungary) Dániel Nagy (RW) loan back to (Hungary) Balatonfüredi KSE

Transfers for the 2014–15 season

Joining

- (Montenegro) Rade Mijatović (GK) from (North Macedonia) Metalurg Skopje
- (Ukraine) Vladyslav Ostroushko (LB) from (Ukraine) Motor Zaporizhzhia
- (Slovenia) Anže Ratajec (CB) from (Slovenia) RK Trimo Trebnje
- (Hungary) Ádám Gebhardt (RW) from (Hungary) ETO-SZESE Győr
- (Montenegro) Stefan Čavor (RB) from (Slovenia) RK Celje
- (Hungary) Dániel Nagy (RW) on loan from (Hungary) Balatonfüredi KSE

Leaving

- (Poland) Piotr Wyszomirski (GK) to (Hungary) MOL-Pick Szeged
- (Spain) Garcia Alberto Aguirrezabalaga (RW) to (Spain) Amenabar ZKE
- (Bosnia and Herzegovina) Kosta Savić (RB) to (Poland) KS Azoty-Puławy
- (Serbia) Đorđe Golubović (RB) to (Spain) AB Gijón Jovellanos
- (Hungary) Ádám Országh (RW) to (Hungary) Ceglédi KKSE
- (Hungary) Gábor Grebenár (LB) to (France) US Ivry
- (Slovakia) Gabriel Vadkerti (CB) on loan at (Hungary) PLER KC
- (Hungary) Gergő Miklós (GK) to (Hungary) Orosházi FKSE
- (Hungary) Péter Kovacsics (LW) on loan at (Hungary) Balatonfüredi KSE
- (Serbia) Bojan Rađenović (LW) on loan at (Hungary) Sport36-Komló

Transfers for the 2013–14 season

Joining

- (Belarus) Barys Pukhouski (CB) from (Belarus) SKA Minsk
- (Spain) Garcia Alberto Aguirrezabalaga (RW) from (Slovenia) RK Trimo Trebnje
- (Hungary) Ákos Lele (LB) from (Hungary) Grundfos Tatabánya KC
- (Hungary) Bálint Pordán (LP) from (Hungary) Grundfos Tatabánya KC
- (Hungary) Tibor Gazdag (LW) from (Hungary) Gyöngyösi KK
- (Serbia) Đorđe Golubović (RB) from (Spain) Ademar León
- (Bosnia and Herzegovina) Kosta Savić (RB) from (France) Aix-en-Provence

Leaving

- (Croatia) Nikola Kedžo (RB) to (North Macedonia) RK Metalurg Skopje
- (Hungary) Dávid Katzirz (LB) to (Hungary) Grundfos Tatabánya KC
- (Hungary) László Széles (LW) to (Hungary) Orosházi FKSE
- (Hungary) Tibor Cifra (LB) to (Hungary) Orosházi FKSE
- (Hungary) Zoltán Miss (RW) to (Hungary) Kecskeméti TE
- (Hungary) Bence Simon (CB) to (Hungary) ETO-SZESE Győr

== Previous squads ==
2018–2019 Team
Shirt No	Nationality	Player	Birth Date	Position
1	Hungary	Tibor Balogh	25 September 1993 (age 33)	Goalkeeper
3	HungarySerbia	Marko Vasić	19 July 1989 (age 37)	Right Winger
4	Hungary	Ádám Vasvári	24 April 1994 (age 32)	Left Back
6	Hungary	Martin Varjú	3 January 1996 (age 30)	Right Winger
7	Hungary	Egon Hanusz	25 September 1997 (age 29)	Central Back
8	Hungary	Péter Bazsó	6 June 2000 (age 26)	Left Winger
10	Serbia	Alem Toskic	12 February 1982 (age 44)	Line Player
11	Hungary	Attila Tóth	17 March 1997 (age 29)	Right Back
16	Hungary	Ádám Füstös	4 December 2001 (age 24)	Goalkeeper
17	Slovenia	Klemen Cehte	10 May 1986 (age 40)	Left Back
18	Hungary	Erik Szeitl	18 July 1997 (age 29)	Line Player
23	Slovenia	Borut Oslak	27 February 1984 (age 42)	Central Back
25	Serbia	Darko Pavlović	5 June 1981 (age 45)	Left Back
28	Hungary	Gyula Kerkovits	30 May 1998 (age 28)	Left Winger
32	Slovenia	Rok Zaponšek	30 October 1992 (age 33)	Goalkeeper
45	Bosnia and Herzegovina	Gafar Hadžiomerović	13 February 1990 (age 36)	Line Player
77	Croatia	Antonio Kovačević	21 May 1987 (age 39)	Left Winger
90	Belarus	Aleh Astrashapkin	20 January 1992 (age 34)	Right Back
95	Hungary	Szabolcs Nagy	24 November 1995 (age 30)	Left Back
97	Hungary	Tamás Farkas	17 July 1997 (age 29)	Left Back

2016–2017 Team
Shirt No	Nationality	Player	Birth Date	Position
1	Hungary	Tibor Balogh	25 September 1993 (age 33)	Goalkeeper
6	Hungary	Martin Varjú	3 January 1996 (age 30)	Right Winger
7	Montenegro	Stefan Čavor	3 November 1994 (age 31)	Right Back
8	Hungary	Rudolf Faluvégi	9 January 1994 (age 32)	Left Back
10	Hungary	Levente Halász	24 July 1988 (age 38)	Left Back
12	Hungary	Ákos Balogh	9 February 1997 (age 29)	Goalkeeper
13	Hungary	Tibor Gazdag	7 August 1991 (age 35)	Left Winger
16	Hungary	László Bartucz	5 November 1991 (age 34)	Goalkeeper
18	Croatia	Josip Pazin	1 October 1985 (age 41)	Right Back
19	Hungary	Péter Hornyák	4 October 1995 (age 31)	Right Winger
22	Hungary	Bálint Pordán	12 October 1988 (age 37)	Line Player
23	Slovenia	Borut Oslak	27 February 1984 (age 42)	Central Back
24	Serbia	Bojan Rađenović	4 September 1994 (age 32)	Left Winger
39	Hungary	Egon Hanusz	25 September 1997 (age 29)	Central Back
40	Hungary	Áron Géczi	27 April 1996 (age 30)	Line Player
41	Hungary	Jerebie Iulian Ernest	13 January 1995 (age 31)	Line Player
42	Hungary	Szabolcs Szkokán	15 April 1995 (age 31)	Right Winger
43	Hungary	István Mátó	20 April 1994 (age 32)	Line Player
45	Bosnia and Herzegovina	Gafar Hadžiomerović	13 February 1990 (age 36)	Line Player
77	Portugal	Alvaro Rodrigues	21 May 1981 (age 45)	Line Player
81	Slovakia	Jakub Mikita	7 May 1993 (age 33)	Left Back
90	Belarus	Aleh Astrashapkin	20 January 1992 (age 34)	Right Back

2014–2015 Team
Shirt No	Nationality	Player	Birth Date	Position
1	Hungary	Tibor Balogh	25 September 1993 (age 33)	Goalkeeper
2	Hungary	Gábor Herbert	6 February 1979 (age 47)	Line Player
6	Hungary	Dániel Nagy	14 July 1992 (age 34)	Right Winger
7	Montenegro	Stefan Čavor	3 November 1994 (age 31)	Right Back
10	Belarus	Barys Pukhouski	3 January 1987 (age 39)	Central Back
13	Hungary	Tibor Gazdag	7 August 1991 (age 35)	Left Winger
15	Hungary	Tamás Borsos	13 June 1990 (age 36)	Left Back
17	Hungary	Gábor Oláh	21 January 1980 (age 46)	Right Back
20	Hungary	Bálint Pordán	12 October 1988 (age 37)	Line Player
21	Hungary	Ákos Lele	24 March 1988 (age 38)	Left Back
22	Slovakia	Gabriel Vadkerti	4 January 1985 (age 41)	Central Back
23	Ukraine	Vladyslav Ostroushko	5 March 1988 (age 38)	Left Back
24	Slovenia	Anže Ratajec	4 March 1991 (age 35)	Central Back
25	Hungary	Ádám Gebhardt	25 October 1988 (age 37)	Right Winger
28	Hungary	Szabolcs Szöllősi	28 January 1989 (age 37)	Line Player
29	Hungary	Péter Pallag	22 May 1990 (age 36)	Goalkeeper
30	Montenegro	Rade Mijatović	30 June 1981 (age 45)	Goalkeeper
39	Hungary	Egon Hanusz	25 September 1997 (age 29)	Central Back
40	Hungary	Attila Füstös	22 September 1994 (age 32)	Left Back
41	Hungary	Jerebie Iulian Ernest	13 January 1995 (age 31)	Line Player
42	Hungary	Péter Megyeri	26 June 1994 (age 32)	Right Winger
66	Hungary	Máté Nagy	13 March 1986 (age 40)	Left Winger
94	Hungary	Ferenc Kovacsics	12 February 1993 (age 33)	Left Winger

2013–2014 Team
Shirt No	Nationality	Player	Birth Date	Position
1	Hungary	Gergő Miklós	4 November 1994 (age 31)	Goalkeeper
2	Hungary	Gábor Herbert	6 February 1979 (age 47)	Line Player
8	Hungary	Gábor Grebenár	17 August 1984 (age 42)	Left Back
10	Belarus	Barys Pukhouski	3 January 1987 (age 39)	Central Back
12	Hungary	Tibor Balogh	25 September 1993 (age 33)	Goalkeeper
13	Hungary	Tibor Gazdag	7 August 1991 (age 35)	Left Winger
14	Hungary	Szabolcs Döme	2 March 1994 (age 32)	Line Player
15	Hungary	Tamás Borsos	13 June 1990 (age 36)	Left Back
16	Poland	Piotr Wyszomirski	6 January 1988 (age 38)	Goalkeeper
17	Hungary	Gábor Oláh	21 January 1980 (age 46)	Right Back
20	Hungary	Bálint Pordán	12 October 1988 (age 37)	Line Player
21	Hungary	Ákos Lele	24 March 1988 (age 38)	Left Back
22	Slovakia	Gabriel Vadkerti	4 January 1985 (age 41)	Central Back
23	Hungary	Ádám Országh	6 October 1989 (age 37)	Right Winger
28	Hungary	Szabolcs Szöllősi	28 January 1989 (age 37)	Line Player
29	Hungary	Péter Pallag	22 May 1990 (age 36)	Goalkeeper
33	Bosnia and Herzegovina	Kosta Savić	15 December 1987 (age 38)	Right Back
40	Hungary	Attila Füstös	22 September 1994 (age 32)	Left Back
44	Serbia	Đorđe Golubović	20 May 1992 (age 34)	Right Back
66	Hungary	Máté Nagy	13 March 1986 (age 40)	Left Winger
88	Spain	Garcia Alberto Aguirrezabalaga	1 December 1988 (age 37)	Right Winger
66	Hungary	Péter Kovacsics	13 June 1994 (age 32)	Left Winger
92	Hungary	Péter Megyeri	26 June 1994 (age 32)	Right Winger
96	Hungary	Márió Györffi	23 June 1993 (age 33)	Left Back

== Top scorers ==
Season	Player	Apps/Goals
2005–2006	(Hungary) László Takács	21/166
2006–2007	(Hungary) László Takács	26/94
2007–2008	(Hungary) Péter Erdélyi	22/109
2008–2009	(Hungary) Gábor Oláh	32/162
2009–2010	(Hungary) Gábor Oláh	29/165
2010–2011	(Hungary) Zoltán Miss	30/133
2011–2012	(Hungary) Gábor Oláh	24/138
2012–2013	(Hungary) Szabolcs Szöllősi	26/111
2013–2014	(Belarus) Barys Pukhouski	32/137
2014–2015	(Hungary) Ákos Lele	32/111
2015–2016	(Montenegro) Stefan Čavor	34/172
2016–2017	(Belarus) Aleh Astrashapkin	26/108
2017–2018	(Hungary) (Serbia) Marko Vasić	26/173
2018–2019	(Hungary) (Serbia) Marko Vasić	21/122
2019–2020	Cancelled	
2020–2021	(Serbia) Mladen Krsmančić	23/125
2021–2022	(Serbia) Mladen Krsmančić	20/116
2022–2023	(Serbia) Mladen Krsmančić	26/139
2023–2024	(Hungary) Marcell Gábor	26/113
2024–2025	(Serbia) Aleksa Tufegdžić	26/101
2025–2026	(Bosnia and Herzegovina) Domagoj Alilović	25/142

== Retired numbers ==
Csurgói KK retired numbers
N°	Nationality	Player	Position	Tenure
7	(Hungary)	Egon Hanusz	Central Back	−2021

== Honours ==
Honours	No.	Years
League
Nemzeti Bajnokság I Third Place	1	2012–13
Nemzeti Bajnokság I/B Winners	1	2007–08
Domestic Cups
Magyar Kupa Third Place	1	2012–13
Best European Results
EHF Cup Group Stage	1	2013–14

=== Individual awards ===
==== Domestic ====
Nemzeti Bajnokság I Top Scorer

Season	Name	Goals
2017–18	(Hungary) (Serbia) Marko Vasić	173

== Seasons ==
=== Season to season ===
As of 04/07/2025

- Seasons in Nemzeti Bajnokság I: 17
- Seasons in Nemzeti Bajnokság I/B: 2
- Seasons in Nemzeti Bajnokság II: 13

Season	Tier	Division	Place	Magyar Kupa
1992–93	3	NB II Délnyugat	7th	
1993–94	3	NB II Délnyugat	7th	
1994–95	3	NB II Délnyugat	4th	
1995–96	3	NB II Délnyugat	6th	
1996–97	3	NB II Délnyugat	8th	
1997–98	3	NB II Délnyugat	4th	
1998–99	3	NB II Délnyugat	2nd	
1999–00	3	NB II Délnyugat	3rd	
2000–01	3	NB II Délnyugat	3rd	

Season	Tier	Division	Place	Magyar Kupa
2001–02	3	NB II Délnyugat	3rd	
2002–03	3	NB II Délnyugat	3rd	
2003–04	3	NB II Délnyugat	2nd	
2004–05	3	NB II Délnyugat	2nd	
2005–06	3	NB II Délnyugat	1st	
2006–07	2	NB I/B Nyugat	7th	
2007–08	2	NB I/B Nyugat	1st	
2008–09	1	NB I	9th	
2009–10	1	NB I	6th	

Season	Tier	Division	Place	Magyar Kupa
2010–11	1	NB I	6th	Round 4
2011–12	1	NB I	4th	Quarter-finals
2012–13	1	NB I	Third place	Third place
2013–14	1	NB I	4th	Quarter-finals
2014–15	1	NB I	4th	Round 4
2015–16	1	NB I	5th	Quarter-finals
2016–17	1	NB I	5th	Fourth place
2017–18	1	NB I	6th	Fourth place
2018–19	1	NB I	5th	Round 4
2019–20	1	NB I	Cancelled due COVID-19	
2020–21	1	NB I	5th	Round 5
2021–22	1	NB I	9th	Round 4
2022–23	1	NB I	6th	Round 5
2023–24	1	NB I	5th	Round 4
2024–25	1	NB I	7th	Round 4
2025–26	1	NB I	10th	Round 4

=== European competition ===
EHF Cup: It was formerly known as the IHF Cup until 1993. Also, starting from the 2012–13 season the competition has been merged with the EHF Cup Winners' Cup. The competition will be known as the EHF European League from the 2020–21 season.

Competition	Round	Club	Home	Away	Aggregate
2013–14 EHF Cup	Second qualifying round	(Spain) BM Aragón	30–27	28–25	58–52
2013–14 EHF Cup	Third qualifying round	(Turkey) Beşiktaş J.K.	34–25	31–29	65–54
2013–14 EHF Cup	Group stage (Group A)	(Germany) TSV Hannover-Burgdorf	36–28	26–27	3rd
2013–14 EHF Cup	Group stage (Group A)	(Spain) Reale Ademar León	31–27	19–28	3rd
2013–14 EHF Cup	Group stage (Group A)	(Sweden) Lugi HF	25–22	26–28	3rd
2015–16 EHF Cup	Second qualifying round	(Poland) Pogoń Szczecin	29–19	30–27	59–46
2015–16 EHF Cup	Third qualifying round	(Germany) SC Magdeburg	24–23	37–42	61–65
2016–17 EHF Cup	First qualifying round	(Norway) Bodø HK	28–21	19–23	47–44
2016–17 EHF Cup	Second qualifying round	(Belgium) Achilles Bocholt	24–23	34–23	58–46
2016–17 EHF Cup	Third qualifying round	(Spain) Helvetia Anaitasuna	30–26	21–27	51–53
2017–18 EHF Cup	Second qualifying round	(Croatia) RK Dubrava	33–24	26–36	59–60
2019–20 EHF Cup	Second qualifying round	(Romania) HC Dobrogea Sud Constanța	19–21	24–22	43–43 (a)
2019–20 EHF Cup	Third qualifying round	(France) USAM Nîmes Gard	28–25	20–29	48–54
2021–22 EHF European League	First qualifying round	(Romania) HC Dobrogea Sud Constanța	23–27	28–31	51–58

Season	Competition	Round	Club	Home	Away	Aggregate
2021–22	EHF European League	First qualifying round	(Romania) HC Dobrogea Sud Constanța	23–27	28–31	51–58

==== European record ====
As of 28 August 2021:

Competition	Seasons	Year(s) in the competition
EHF European League (EHF Cup)	6x	2013/14, 2015/16, 2016/17, 2017/18, 2019/20, 2021/22
Source: kézitörténelem.hu	5 seasons	

==== Overall results by opponent and country ====
As of 01/10/2021

Country	Club	P	W	D	L	GF	GA	GD
Belgium	Achilles Bocholt	2	2	0	0	58	46	12
Subtotal		2	2	0	0	58	46	12
Croatia	RK Dubrava	2	1	0	1	59	60	−1
Subtotal		2	1	0	1	59	60	-1
France	USAM Nîmes Gard	2	1	0	1	48	54	−6
Subtotal		2	1	0	1	48	54	-6
Germany	SC Magdeburg	2	1	0	1	61	65	−4
Germany	TSV Hannover-Burgdorf	2	1	0	1	62	55	7
Subtotal		4	2	0	2	123	120	3
Norway	Bodø HK	2	1	0	1	47	44	3
Subtotal		2	1	0	1	47	44	3
Poland	Pogoń Szczecin	2	2	0	0	59	46	13
Subtotal		2	2	0	0	59	46	13
Romania	HC Dobrogea Sud Constanța	4	1	0	3	94	101	−7
Subtotal		4	1	0	3	94	101	-7
Spain	BM Aragón	2	2	0	0	58	52	6
Spain	Helvetia Anaitasuna	2	1	0	1	51	53	−2
Spain	Reale Ademar León	2	1	0	1	50	55	−5
Subtotal		6	4	0	2	159	160	-1
Sweden	Lugi HF	2	1	0	1	51	50	1
Subtotal		2	1	0	1	51	50	1
Turkey	Beşiktaş J.K.	2	2	0	0	65	54	11
Subtotal		2	2	0	0	65	54	11
		P	W	D	L	GF	GA	GD
Total		28	17	0	11	763	735	28

==== EHF ranking ====
Last updated on 27/06/2026

Rank	Team	Points
190	(Austria) HC Linz AG	8
191	(Russia) Chekhovskiye Medvedi	8
192	(France) Cesson Rennes MHB	8
193	(Hungary) Csurgói KK	8
194	(Italy) Sport Club Meran Handball	8
195	(Turkey) Köyceğiz Belediyespor	7
196	(Czech Republic) Talent Plzeň	7

== Records ==
=== Most appearances in international cups ===
Last updated on 27/06/2026

Rank	Name	Apps	Goals
1	(Hungary) Tibor Gazdag	20	38
1	(Hungary) Bálint Pordán	20	25
2	(Bosnia and Herzegovina) Gafar Hadžiomerović	14	28
2	(Hungary) Gábor Herbert	14	4
3	(Hungary) Máté Nagy	13	34
3	(Hungary) Egon Hanusz	13	22
4	(Hungary) Tamás Borsos	12	8
4	(Hungary) László Bartucz	12	0
4	(Hungary) Péter Pallag	12	0
5	(Belarus) Barys Pukhouski	10	53
5	(Belarus) Aleh Astrashapkin	10	41
5	(Hungary) Szabolcs Szöllősi	10	34
5	(Spain) Garcia Alberto Aguirrezabalaga	10	31
5	(Slovenia) Borut Oslak	10	26
5	(Slovakia) Jakub Mikita	10	16
5	(Hungary) Ádám Országh	10	3
5	(Poland) Piotr Wyszomirski	10	0
6	(Hungary) Ákos Lele	9	51
7	(Serbia) Bojan Rađenović	8	22
7	(Hungary) Julian Ernest Jerebie	8	15
7	(Hungary) Gábor Oláh	8	13
7	(Hungary) Gábor Grebenár	8	12
7	(Hungary) Péter Hornyák	8	11
7	(Slovakia) Gabriel Vadkerti	8	6
7	(Hungary) Tibor Balogh	8	0
8	(Montenegro) Stefan Čavor	7	34
8	(Hungary) Rudolf Faluvégi	7	29
8	(Hungary) Martin Varjú	7	3
9	(Hungary) (Serbia) Marko Vasić	6	25
9	(Bosnia and Herzegovina) Kosta Savić	6	18
9	(Hungary) Levente Halász	6	14
9	(Hungary) Erik Szeitl	6	5
9	(Hungary) Ádám Gebhardt	6	4
9	(Hungary) Ádám Vasvári	6	0
9	(Portugal) Álvaro Rodrigues	6	0
10	(Croatia) Josip Pazin	5	6

=== Most goals in international cups ===
Last updated on 27/06/2026

Rank	Name	Apps	Goals
1	(Belarus) Barys Pukhouski	10	53
2	(Hungary) Ákos Lele	9	51
3	(Belarus) Aleh Astrashapkin	10	41
4	(Hungary) Tibor Gazdag	20	38
5	(Montenegro) Stefan Čavor	7	34
5	(Hungary) Szabolcs Szöllősi	10	34
5	(Hungary) Máté Nagy	13	34
6	(Spain) Garcia Alberto Aguirrezabalaga	10	31
7	(Hungary) Rudolf Faluvégi	7	29
8	(Bosnia and Herzegovina) Gafar Hadžiomerović	14	28
9	(Slovenia) Borut Oslak	10	26
10	(Hungary) (Serbia) Marko Vasić	6	25
10	(Hungary) Bálint Pordán	20	25

== Former club members ==
=== Notable former players ===
==== Goalkeepers ====
- (Hungary) László Bartucz (2015–2018)
- (Hungary) Péter Pallag (2006–2018, 2019–2020)
- (Hungary) Márton Székely (2015–2016)
- (Hungary) Péter Tatai (2020–2022)
- (Montenegro) Rade Mijatović (2014–2015)
- (Poland) Piotr Wyszomirski (2012–2014)
- (Slovenia) Rok Zaponšek (2018–2020, 2025–)
- (Slovakia) Teodor Paul (2011–2012)

==== Right wingers ====
- (Hungary) Péter Hornyák (2015–2017)
- (Hungary) Zoltán Miss
- (Hungary) Ádám Országh
- (Hungary) Ádám Tóth (2021–2023)
- (Hungary) (Serbia) Marko Vasić (2017–2021)
- (Spain) Garcia Alberto Aguirrezabalaga (2013–2014)
- (Serbia) Aleksa Tufegdžić (2023–2025)

==== Left wingers ====
- (Hungary) Tibor Gazdag (2013–2018)
- (Hungary) Péter Kovacsics (2006–2015)
- (Bosnia and Herzegovina) Marko Majstorović (2024–2025)
- (Croatia) Antonio Kovačević (2018–2022)

==== Line players ====
- (Hungary) Gábor Herbert (2011–2016)
- (Hungary) Máté Józsa
- (Hungary) Tamás Papp (2023–2025)
- (Hungary) Erik Szeitl (2017–2025)
- (Hungary) Szabolcs Szöllősi (2008–2015)
- (Hungary) György Zsigmond
- (Bosnia and Herzegovina) Gafar Hadžiomerović
- (Bosnia and Herzegovina) Vladimir Vranješ (2025)
- (Portugal) Álvaro Rodrigues (2016–2017)
- (Serbia) Ivan Popović (2020–2021)
- (Serbia) Alem Toskic (2018–2020)

==== Left backs ====
- (Hungary) Sándor Bajusz
- (Hungary) Tamás Borsos (2009–2015, 2019–2024)
- (Hungary) Rudolf Faluvégi (2015–2017)
- (Hungary) Gábor Grebenár (2012–2014)
- (Hungary) Dávid Katzirz (2011–2013)
- (Hungary) Ákos Lele (2013–2015)
- (Bosnia and Herzegovina) Mirko Herceg (2021–)
- (Brazil) Uelington da Silva (2017–2018)
- (North Macedonia) Darko Dimitrievski (2015–2016)
- (Slovenia) Klemen Cehte (2017–2020)
- (Slovenia) Gregor Potočnik (2019–2020)
- (Slovakia) Jakub Mikita
- (Ukraine) Vladyslav Ostroushko (2014–2015)

==== Central backs ====
- (Hungary) Dániel Buday (2009–2010)
- (Hungary) Tamás Frey
- (Hungary) Egon Hanusz (2010–2021)
- (Bosnia and Herzegovina) Domagoj Alilović (2025–)
- (Bosnia and Herzegovina) Marko Tarabochia (2019–2020)
- (Belarus) Barys Pukhouski (2013–2015)
- (Portugal) Filipe Mota (2015–2016)
- (Slovenia) Borut Oslak (2016–2020)
- (Serbia) Mladen Krsmančić
- (Slovakia) Gabriel Vadkerti

==== Right backs ====
- (Hungary) Csaba Leimeter (2019–2021)
- (Hungary) Gábor Oláh
- (Hungary) Attila Tóth
- (Hungary) Péter Tóth (2023–2025)
- (Bosnia and Herzegovina) Kosta Savić (2013–2014)
- (Belarus) Aleh Astrashapkin (2016–2017, 2018–2020)
- (Croatia) Nikola Kedžo (2012–2013)
- (Croatia) Igor Kos
- (Montenegro) Stefan Čavor (2014–2016)
- (Slovenia) Grega Krečič (2020–2023)
- (Serbia) Đorđe Golubović (2013–2014)

=== Former coaches ===
Seasons	Coach	Country
2008–2009	György Zsigmond	(Hungary)
2008–2010	Ferenc Buday	(Hungary)
2009–2010	Károly Vörös	(Hungary)
2010–2013	Botond Bakó	(Hungary)
2012–2014	Vilmos Imre	(Hungary)
2014–2018	László Sótonyi	(Hungary)
2017–2019	József Bencze	(Hungary)
2019–2021	Alem Toskic	(Serbia)
2021	Mariano Ortega	(Spain)
2021–2024	Norbert Baranyai	(Hungary)
2024–2025	Vladan Matić	(Serbia) (Hungary)
2025–	Alem Toskic	(Serbia)
