= 2013–14 Nemzeti Bajnokság I (men's handball) =

NB I
- Season: 2013–14
- Champions: Veszprém (22nd title)
- Relegated: Vác; ETO-SZESE
- Champions League: Veszprém; Szeged
- EHF Cup: Balatonfüred; Tatabánya; Orosháza
- Matches: 203
- Goals: 10,836 (53.38 per match)
- Top goalscorer: Jonas Larholm (133 goals)
- Biggest home win: Veszprém 43–16 Cegléd
- Biggest away win: Cegléd 18–43 Szeged
- Highest scoring: Veszprém 43–30 Gyöngyös

The 2013–14 Nemzeti Bajnokság I is the 62nd season of the Nemzeti Bajnokság I, Hungary's premier Handball league.

== Team information ==
Locations of the 2013–14 Nemzeti Bajnokság I

The following 13 clubs compete in the NB I during the 2013–14 season:

Team	Location	Arena	Capacity
Balatonfüred	Balatonfüred	Észak-Balatoni Reg. Konf. Központ	712
Cegléd	Cegléd	Gál József Sportcsarnok	1,200
Csurgó	Csurgó	Sótonyi László Sportcsarnok	800
Gyöngyös	Gyöngyös	Városi Sportcsarnok	1,100
Mezőkövesd	Mezőkövesd	Városi Sportcsarnok	800
Orosháza	Orosháza	Eötvös Sportcsarnok	600
PLER	Budapest	Lőrinci Sportcsarnok	700
Szeged	Szeged	Városi Sportcsarnok	3,200
ETO-SZESE	Győr	Győr Városi Egyetemi Csarnok	3,000
Tatabánya	Tatabánya	Földi Imre Sportcsarnok	1,000
Vác	Vác	Városi Sportcsarnok	800
Veszprém	Veszprém	Veszprém Aréna	5,096

=== Personnel and kits ===
Following is the list of clubs competing in 2013–14 Nemzeti Bajnokság I, with their manager, captain, kit manufacturer and shirt sponsor.

Team	President	Head coach	Kit manufacturer	Shirt sponsor
Balatonfüred	László Csima	(Hungary) László Sótonyi	Erima	Sennebogen, 77 Elektronika
Cegléd	István Borsos	(Hungary) István Kökény	Erima	BSS 2000
Csurgó	János Varga	(Hungary) Vilmos Imre	hummel	R csoport, Patrik & Varga
Gyöngyös	Zsolt Marczin	(Hungary) Károly Nagy	Puma	B. Braun
Mezőkövesd	Gábor Mikulás	(Hungary) László Skaliczki	Kempa	Mátrai Erőmű Zrt.
Orosháza	István Rajki	(Serbia) Vladan Jordović	ASICS	Linamar, Swietelsky
PLER	László Németh	(Hungary) István Hutvágner	Erima	HungaroControl, Natur Aqua
Szeged	Richárd Mezei	(Spain) Juan Carlos Pastor	adidas	Pick, OTP Bank
ETO-SZESE	Dr. László Hoffmann	(Hungary) Miklós Rosta	mass	Árkád Győr
Tatabánya	László Marosi	(Hungary) Viktor Debre	Jako	Grundfos
Vác	Dr. Attila Schoffer	(Hungary) István Rosta	Kempa	—
Veszprém	Ákos Hunyadfalvy	(Spain) Antonio Carlos Ortega	adidas	MKB Bank, MVM

== Regular season ==
=== Standings ===
	Team	Pld	W	D	L	GF	GA	Diff	Pts
1	MKB-MVM Veszprém	24	23	0	1	845	543	+302	46
2	Pick Szeged	24	23	0	1	757	533	+224	46
3	Csurgói KK	24	17	3	4	698	601	+97	37
4	Balatonfüredi KSE	24	14	3	7	653	595	+58	31
5	B.Braun Gyöngyös	24	13	5	6	651	648	+3	31
6	Grundfos-Tatabánya KC	24	13	4	7	608	576	+32	30
7	Orosházi FKSE-LINAMAR	24	6	5	13	576	652	−76	17
8	Ceglédi KKSE	24	8	0	16	590	695	−105	16
9	Váci KSE	24	7	1	16	564	619	−55	15
10	Hungary (junior) *	24	6	2	16	594	698	−104	14
11	Mezőkövesdi KC	24	5	1	18	566	726	−160	11
12	ETO-SZESE Győr	24	5	1	18	570	674	−104	11
13	PLER Budapest	24	3	1	20	598	714	−116	7

* : Hungary national junior handball team played only in regular season.

Championship Playoff
Relegation Playoff

Pld - Played; W - Won; L - Lost; PF - Points for; PA - Points against; Diff - Difference; Pts - Points.

=== Schedule and results ===
In the table below the home teams are listed on the left and the away teams along the top.

	Balatonfüredi KSE	Ceglédi KKSE	Csurgói KK	Gyöngyösi KK	JUN	Mezőkövesdi KC	Orosházi FKSE	PLER KC	SC Pick Szeged	ETO-SZESE Győr	Tatabánya KC	Váci KSE	Veszprém KC
Balatonfüred		32–24	26–31	31–31	33–18	39–18	30–25	28–23	20–28	26–16	32–26	30–20	25–39
Cegléd	20–21		28–38	26–28	28–23	28–21	28–21	30–23	18–43	33–30	18–23	27–25	25–40
Csurgó	29–24	36–26		26–18	31–25	35–27	34–18	36–18	27–28	27–23	26–26	24–22	26–31
Gyöngyös	22–22	33–26	26–26		29–26	33–24	28–25	29–28	27–35	25–24	26–25	29–29	20–30
Hungary (junior)	25–29	27–25	24–36	23–24		28–25	27–27	29–24	23–29	19–25	19–27	26–25	21–34
Mezőkövesd	19–28	25–27	25–27	23–34	32–38		22–22	28–24	25–34	25–24	19–28	22–18	23–36
Orosháza	18–23	24–20	24–25	25–25	30–26	35–24		29–29	22–29	20–21	21–21	26–25	24–34
PLER	23–29	30–23	20–28	21–22	29–32	28–30	32–28		26–37	28–24	27–30	26–27	23–33
Szeged	35–25	34–22	32–20	36–30	30–16	28–20	33–20	41–20		35–25	26–16	29–20	23–22
ETO-SZESE Győr	27–25	20–28	24–35	23–29	29–29	25–26	22–24	25–22	19–31		19–31	25–23	26–33
Tatabánya	22–22	29–20	27–27	28–31	28–24	34–19	32–27	28–26	23–28	23–22		18–14	21–27
Vác	22–30	26–22	20–25	23–22	30–25	32–24	20–22	27–20	23–31	35–26	21–22		20–34
Veszprém	34–23	43–16	39–23	43–30	39–21	41–20	42–20	41–28	25–22	42–26	29–20	34–17	

=== Top goalscorers ===
#	Player	Goals	Team
1	(Sweden) Jonas Larholm	133	Szeged
2	(Hungary) Balázs Bíró	130	Cegléd
3	(Hungary) Gergely Harsányi	129	Tatabánya
4	(Hungary) Balázs Szöllősi	113	Balatonfüred
5	(Belarus) Barys Pukhouski	103	Csurgó
6	(Hungary) Tamás Frey	100	Gyöngyös
6	(Hungary) Levente Halász	100	ETO-SZESE
8	(Hungary) Dániel Buday	95	Orosháza
9	(Montenegro) Ivan Perišić	94	Cegléd
9	(Portugal) Filipe Mota	94	ETO-SZESE

== Championship Playoffs ==
Teams in bold won the playoff series. Numbers to the left of each team indicate the team's original playoff seeding. Numbers to the right indicate the score of each playoff game.

Quarterfinals
4	**Balatonfüredi KSE**	**27**	26	**29**
5	B.Braun Gyöngyös	21	**28**	25
3	**Csurgói KK**	**35**	23	**29**
6	Grundfos-Tatabánya KC	26	**25**	28

Semifinals
1	**MKB-MVM Veszprém**	**38**	**30**
4	Balatonfüredi KSE	26	25
2	**Pick Szeged**	**30**	**28**
3	Csurgói KK	23	22

Final
1	**MKB-MVM Veszprém**	**30**	**28**
2	Pick Szeged	21	24

=== Quarter-finals ===
==== 1st leg ====
22 March; 12:50 (UTC+2)	**Balatonfüredi KSE**	**27 – 21**	**B.Braun Gyöngyös**	Észak-Balatoni Reg. Konf. Központ, Balatonfüred; Attendance: 600; Referees: Dr. Kálmán Soós, Győző Márczi
22 March; 12:50 (UTC+2)	Bóka, Zdolik 5	(11–8)	Frey, Hajdú, Koller 5	Észak-Balatoni Reg. Konf. Központ, Balatonfüred; Attendance: 600; Referees: Dr. Kálmán Soós, Győző Márczi
22 March; 12:50 (UTC+2)	3× (yellow card) 6× (suspension)	Report	3× (yellow card) 4× (suspension)	Észak-Balatoni Reg. Konf. Központ, Balatonfüred; Attendance: 600; Referees: Dr. Kálmán Soós, Győző Márczi

26 March; 18:00 (UTC+2)	**Csurgói KK**	**35 – 26**	**Grundfos-Tatabánya KC**	Városi Sportcsarnok, Csurgó; Attendance: 700; Referees: József Szalai, Csaba Marczinka
26 March; 18:00 (UTC+2)	Gazdag, Lele, Grebenár 6	(18–12)	Harsányi 7	Városi Sportcsarnok, Csurgó; Attendance: 700; Referees: József Szalai, Csaba Marczinka
26 March; 18:00 (UTC+2)	3× (yellow card) 8× (suspension) 1× (red card)	Report	3× (yellow card) 3× (suspension)	Városi Sportcsarnok, Csurgó; Attendance: 700; Referees: József Szalai, Csaba Marczinka

==== 2nd leg ====
26 March; 18:00 (UTC+2)	**B.Braun Gyöngyös**	**28 – 26**	**Balatonfüredi KSE**	Városi Sportcsarnok, Gyöngyös; Attendance: 700; Referees: Bertalan Nyárádi, Sándor Hanufer
26 March; 18:00 (UTC+2)	Sándor 6	(14–14)	Faluvégi 6	Városi Sportcsarnok, Gyöngyös; Attendance: 700; Referees: Bertalan Nyárádi, Sándor Hanufer
26 March; 18:00 (UTC+2)	3× (yellow card) 3× (suspension)	Report	3× (yellow card) 2× (suspension)	Városi Sportcsarnok, Gyöngyös; Attendance: 700; Referees: Bertalan Nyárádi, Sándor Hanufer

9 April; 18:00 (UTC+2)	**Grundfos-Tatabánya KC**	**25 – 23**	**Csurgói KK**	Földi Imre Sportcsarnok, Tatabánya; Attendance: 900; Referees: Péter Horváth, Balázs Márton
9 April; 18:00 (UTC+2)	Díaz 7	(15–13)	Lele 6	Földi Imre Sportcsarnok, Tatabánya; Attendance: 900; Referees: Péter Horváth, Balázs Márton
9 April; 18:00 (UTC+2)	3× (yellow card) 7× (suspension)	Report	3× (yellow card) 9× (suspension) 1× (red card)	Földi Imre Sportcsarnok, Tatabánya; Attendance: 900; Referees: Péter Horváth, Balázs Márton

==== 3rd leg ====
29 March; 18:00 (UTC+2)	**Balatonfüredi KSE**	**29 – 25**	**B.Braun Gyöngyös**	Észak-Balatoni Reg. Konf. Központ, Balatonfüred; Attendance: 700; Referees: Gyula Demény, Péter Éles
29 March; 18:00 (UTC+2)	Grigorev, Tombor, Zdolik 6	(16–12)	Frey 8	Észak-Balatoni Reg. Konf. Központ, Balatonfüred; Attendance: 700; Referees: Gyula Demény, Péter Éles
29 March; 18:00 (UTC+2)	2× (yellow card) 8× (suspension) 1× (red card)	Report	2× (yellow card) 5× (suspension) 1× (red card)	Észak-Balatoni Reg. Konf. Központ, Balatonfüred; Attendance: 700; Referees: Gyula Demény, Péter Éles

Balatonfüredi KSE won series 2–1 and advanced to Semifinals.

16 April
18:00 (UTC+2)
Csurgói KK
**29 – 28** **(ET)**
Grundfos-Tatabánya KC
Városi Sportcsarnok, Csurgó
Attendance: 700
Referees: Péter Horváth, Balázs Márton
Gazdag 7
(12–13)
Katzirz 8
3× (yellow card) 5× (suspension)
Report
3× (yellow card) 8× (suspension) 1× (red card)

FT: 26–26 ET: 3–2

Csurgói KK won series 2–1 and advanced to Semifinals.

=== Semifinals ===
==== 1st leg ====
8 April; 18:00 (UTC+2)	**MKB-MVM Veszprém**	**38 – 26**	**Balatonfüredi KSE**	Veszprém Aréna, Veszprém; Attendance: 2,000; Referees: Attila Heim, Csaba Jolántai
8 April; 18:00 (UTC+2)	Ilić, Jamali 6	(19–15)	Zdolik 7	Veszprém Aréna, Veszprém; Attendance: 2,000; Referees: Attila Heim, Csaba Jolántai
8 April; 18:00 (UTC+2)	3× (yellow card) 3× (suspension)	Report	3× (yellow card) 3× (suspension)	Veszprém Aréna, Veszprém; Attendance: 2,000; Referees: Attila Heim, Csaba Jolántai

24 April; 18:00 (UTC+2)	**Pick Szeged**	**30 – 23**	**Csurgói KK**	Városi Sportcsarnok, Szeged; Attendance: 1,500; Referees: Péter Herczeg, Péter Südi
24 April; 18:00 (UTC+2)	Larholm 6	(14–8)	Aguirrezabalaga, Gazdag 5	Városi Sportcsarnok, Szeged; Attendance: 1,500; Referees: Péter Herczeg, Péter Südi
24 April; 18:00 (UTC+2)	2× (yellow card) 3× (suspension)	Report	3× (yellow card) 5× (suspension)	Városi Sportcsarnok, Szeged; Attendance: 1,500; Referees: Péter Herczeg, Péter Südi

==== 2nd leg ====
29 April; 18:00 (UTC+2)	**Balatonfüredi KSE**	**25 – 30**	**MKB-MVM Veszprém**	Észak-Balatoni Reg. Konf. Központ, Balatonfüred; Attendance: 700; Referees: Miklós Andorka, Győző Márczi
29 April; 18:00 (UTC+2)	Győri 6	(11–14)	Vilovski 8	Észak-Balatoni Reg. Konf. Központ, Balatonfüred; Attendance: 700; Referees: Miklós Andorka, Győző Márczi
29 April; 18:00 (UTC+2)	2× (yellow card)	Report	2× (yellow card) 2× (suspension)	Észak-Balatoni Reg. Konf. Központ, Balatonfüred; Attendance: 700; Referees: Miklós Andorka, Győző Márczi

MKB-MVM Veszprém won series 2–0 and advanced to Final.

30 April; 20:00 (UTC+2)	**Csurgói KK**	**22 – 28**	**Pick Szeged**	Városi Sportcsarnok, Csurgó; Attendance: 650; Referees: Csaba Kékes, Pál Kékes
30 April; 20:00 (UTC+2)	Lele 5	(9–13)	Balogh 9	Városi Sportcsarnok, Csurgó; Attendance: 650; Referees: Csaba Kékes, Pál Kékes
30 April; 20:00 (UTC+2)	2× (yellow card) 2× (suspension)	Report	3× (yellow card) 6× (suspension)	Városi Sportcsarnok, Csurgó; Attendance: 650; Referees: Csaba Kékes, Pál Kékes

Pick Szeged won series 2–0 and advanced to Final.

=== Final ===
==== 1st leg ====
7 May; 20:00 (UTC+2)	**MKB-MVM Veszprém**	**30 – 21**	**Pick Szeged**	Veszprém Aréna, Veszprém; Attendance: 4,300; Referees: Csaba Kékes, Pál Kékes
7 May; 20:00 (UTC+2)	Ilić 7	(15–9)	Balogh, Larholm 5	Veszprém Aréna, Veszprém; Attendance: 4,300; Referees: Csaba Kékes, Pál Kékes
7 May; 20:00 (UTC+2)	3× (yellow card) 4× (suspension)	Report	1× (yellow card) 2× (suspension)	Veszprém Aréna, Veszprém; Attendance: 4,300; Referees: Csaba Kékes, Pál Kékes

==== 2nd leg ====
11 May; 19:15 (UTC+2)	**Pick Szeged**	**24 – 28**	**MKB-MVM Veszprém**	Városi Sportcsarnok, Szeged; Attendance: 3,500; Referees: Csaba Dobrovits, Dr. Péter Tájok
11 May; 19:15 (UTC+2)	Ancsin, Prce 5	(13–13)	Nagy 7	Városi Sportcsarnok, Szeged; Attendance: 3,500; Referees: Csaba Dobrovits, Dr. Péter Tájok
11 May; 19:15 (UTC+2)	2× (yellow card) 3× (suspension)	Report	2× (yellow card) 4× (suspension)	Városi Sportcsarnok, Szeged; Attendance: 3,500; Referees: Csaba Dobrovits, Dr. Péter Tájok

MKB-MVM Veszprém won Championship final series 2–0.

NB I 2013–14
Champions

**MKB-MVM Veszprém**
**22nd Title**

Team roster

1 Nándor Fazekas, 2 Uros Vilovski, 3 Péter Gulyás, 4 Gergő Iváncsik, 5 Timuzsin Schuch, 9 Tamás Iváncsik, 11 Carlos Ruesga, 13 Momir Ilić, 18 Tamás Mocsai, 19 László Nagy, 21 Iman Jamali, 23 Cristian Ugalde, 25 Chema Rodriguez, 30 Mirsad Terzić, 32 Mirko Alilović, 33 Renato Sulić and 35 Živan Pešić
Head coach: Antonio Carlos Ortega

=== Third Place ===
4 May; 18:30 (UTC+2)	**Balatonfüredi KSE**	**23 – 26**	**Csurgói KK**	Észak-Balatoni Reg. Konf. Központ, Balatonfüred; Attendance: 700; Referees: József Bács, Tamás Bán
4 May; 18:30 (UTC+2)	Szőlősi 7	(9–14)	Pukhouski 7	Észak-Balatoni Reg. Konf. Központ, Balatonfüred; Attendance: 700; Referees: József Bács, Tamás Bán
4 May; 18:30 (UTC+2)	3× (yellow card) 1× (suspension)	Report	3× (yellow card) 5× (suspension) 1× (red card)	Észak-Balatoni Reg. Konf. Központ, Balatonfüred; Attendance: 700; Referees: József Bács, Tamás Bán

10 May; 18:00 (UTC+2)	**Csurgói KK**	**31 – 38**	**Balatonfüredi KSE**	Városi Sportcsarnok, Csurgó; Attendance: 600; Referees: Gábor I. Hargitai, Gábor Markó
10 May; 18:00 (UTC+2)	Gazdag 9	(11–20)	Szőlősi 13	Városi Sportcsarnok, Csurgó; Attendance: 600; Referees: Gábor I. Hargitai, Gábor Markó
10 May; 18:00 (UTC+2)	3× (yellow card) 5× (suspension)	Report	2× (yellow card) 10× (suspension) 1× (red card)	Városi Sportcsarnok, Csurgó; Attendance: 600; Referees: Gábor I. Hargitai, Gábor Markó

14 May; 18:00 (UTC+2)	**Csurgói KK**	**30 – 34**	**Balatonfüredi KSE**	Városi Sportcsarnok, Csurgó; Attendance: 800; Referees: Csaba Dobrovits, Dr. Péter Tájok
14 May; 18:00 (UTC+2)	Pukhouski 9	(14–15)	Szőlősi 10	Városi Sportcsarnok, Csurgó; Attendance: 800; Referees: Csaba Dobrovits, Dr. Péter Tájok
14 May; 18:00 (UTC+2)	3× (yellow card) 1× (suspension) 1× (red card)	Report	2× (yellow card) 4× (suspension) 1× (red card)	Városi Sportcsarnok, Csurgó; Attendance: 800; Referees: Csaba Dobrovits, Dr. Péter Tájok

Balatonfüredi KSE won series 2–1 and won the Third Place.

=== 5th place ===
4 May; 18:00 (UTC+2)	**Grundfos-Tatabánya KC**	**36 – 26**	**B.Braun Gyöngyös**	Földi Imre Sportcsarnok, Tatabánya; Attendance: 400; Referees: Róbert Medve, László I. Nagy
4 May; 18:00 (UTC+2)	Törő 8	(14–10)	Debreczeni 7	Földi Imre Sportcsarnok, Tatabánya; Attendance: 400; Referees: Róbert Medve, László I. Nagy
4 May; 18:00 (UTC+2)	3× (yellow card) 5× (suspension) 1× (red card)	Report	3× (yellow card) 4× (suspension)	Földi Imre Sportcsarnok, Tatabánya; Attendance: 400; Referees: Róbert Medve, László I. Nagy

10 May; 18:00 (UTC+2)	**B.Braun Gyöngyös**	**21 – 27**	**Grundfos-Tatabánya KC**	Városi Sportcsarnok, Gyöngyös; Attendance: 500; Referees: Tamás Tomecskó-Hunyadi, Tamás Unyatinszki
10 May; 18:00 (UTC+2)	Varsandán 5	(14–17)	Bodó 7	Városi Sportcsarnok, Gyöngyös; Attendance: 500; Referees: Tamás Tomecskó-Hunyadi, Tamás Unyatinszki
10 May; 18:00 (UTC+2)	3× (yellow card) 3× (suspension)	Report	2× (yellow card) 5× (suspension) 1× (red card)	Városi Sportcsarnok, Gyöngyös; Attendance: 500; Referees: Tamás Tomecskó-Hunyadi, Tamás Unyatinszki

Grundfos-Tatabánya KC won series 2–0 and won 5th Place.

== Relegation round ==
=== Final standings ===
	Team	Pld	W	D	L	GF	GA	Diff	Pts	Relegation
7	Orosházi FKSE-LINAMAR	20	12	3	5	526	496	+30	27	
8	PLER Budapest	20	10	2	8	544	543	+1	22	
9	Ceglédi KKSE	20	10	1	9	544	542	+2	21	
10	Mezőkövesdi KC	20	9	3	8	508	528	−20	21	
11	Váci KSE	20	8	2	10	507	485	+22	18	Relegation to the 2014–15 Nemzeti Bajnokság I/B
12	ETO-SZESE Győr	20	5	1	14	526	561	−35	11	Relegation to the 2014–15 Nemzeti Bajnokság I/B

Pld - Played; W - Won; L - Lost; PF - Points for; PA - Points against; Diff - Difference; Pts - Points.

=== Results ===
In the table below the home teams are listed on the left and the away teams along the top.

	Ceglédi KKSE	Mezőkövesdi KC	Orosházi FKSE	PLER KC	ETO-SZESE Győr	Váci KSE
Cegléd		28–27	30–36	31–33	25–25	26–24
Mezőkövesd	27–22		28–26	27–24	38–36	20–20
Orosháza	23–22	26–23		28–26	36–27	24–27
PLER	36–34	31–26	25–25		27–26	22–21
ETO-SZESE Győr	41–34	28–21	23–26	28–30		25–29
Vác	25–26	24–24	22–25	26–28	31–25	

== Final standing ==
Rank	Team	Qualification or relegation
1st place, gold medalist(s)	MKB-MVM Veszprém (C)	2014–15 EHF Champions League group stage
2nd place, silver medalist(s)	Pick Szeged	2014–15 EHF Champions League group stage
3rd place, bronze medalist(s)	Balatonfüredi KSE	2014–15 EHF Cup round 2
4	Csurgói KK	Ineligible for 2014–15 European competitions
5	Grundfos-Tatabánya KC	2014–15 EHF Cup round 2 ^{1}
6	B.Braun Gyöngyös	Ineligible for 2014–15 European competitions
7	Orosházi FKSE-LINAMAR	2014–15 EHF Cup round 1
8	PLER Budapest	
9	Ceglédi KKSE	
10	Mezőkövesdi KC	
11	Váci KSE (R)	Relegation to the 2014–15 Nemzeti Bajnokság I/B
12	ETO-SZESE Győr (R)	Relegation to the 2014–15 Nemzeti Bajnokság I/B

(C) = Champion; (R) = Relegated; (P) = Promoted; (E) = Eliminated; (O) = Play-off winner; (A) = Advances to a further round.

^{1} Since 2013–14 Magyar Kupa both finalists MKB-MVM Veszprém and Pick Szeged qualified for the 2014–15 EHF Champions League Group Phase, the EHF Cup spot was passed to cup third Grundfos-Tatabánya KC.
