= Gazdag =

Gazdag is a Hungarian surname. Notable people with the surname include:

- Dániel Gazdag (born 1996), Hungarian professional footballer
- Gyula Gazdag (born 1947), Hungarian film director, screenwriter, and actor
- Tibor Gazdag (born 1991), Hungarian handballer
