= Stefan Čavor =

Montenegrin handball player (born 1994)

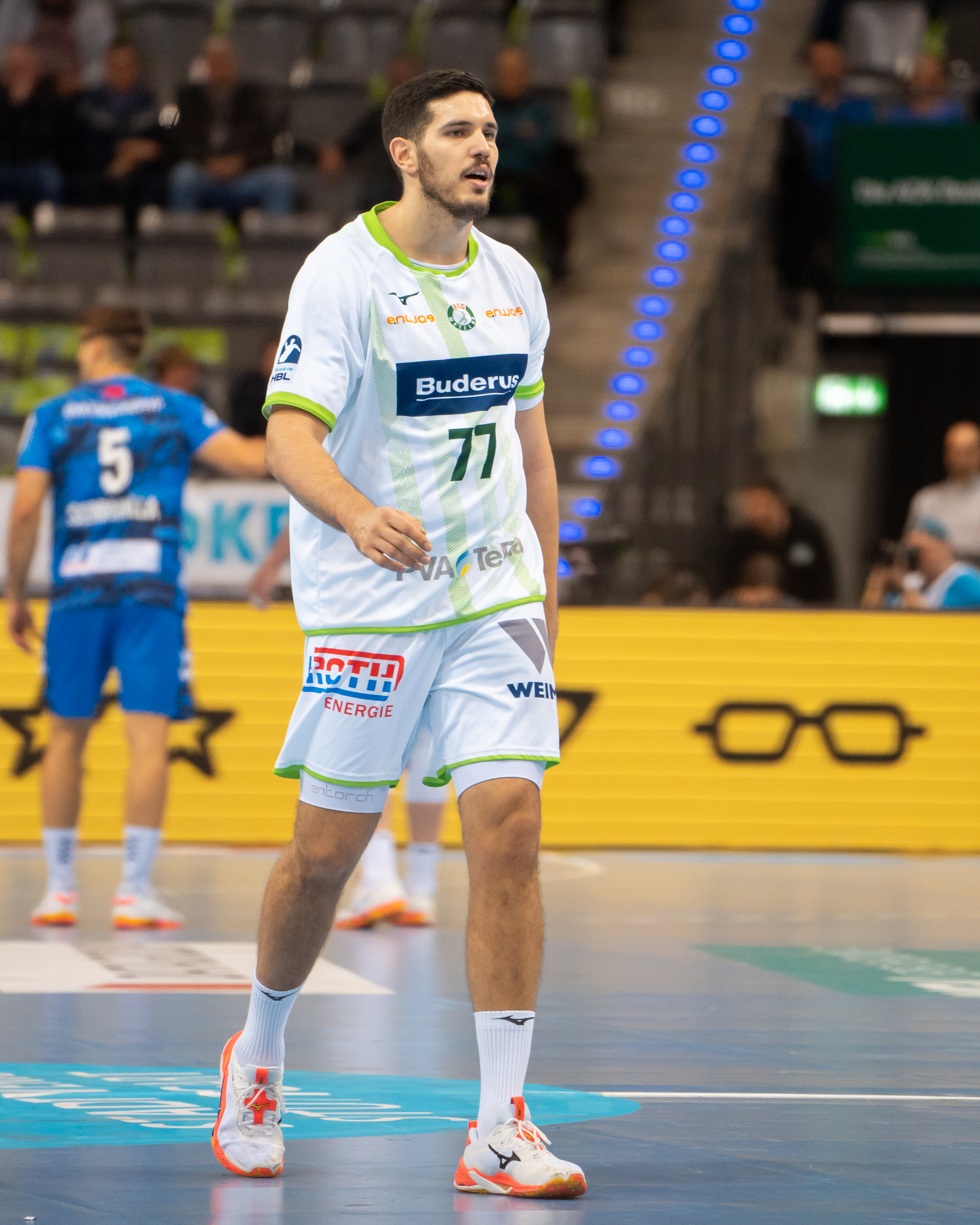

Personal information
- Nationality: Montenegrin
- Born: 3 November 1994 (age 32) Kotor, FR Yugoslavia
- Height: 1.98 m (6 ft 6 in)

Sport
- Sport: Handball
- Position: Right back
- Current club: RD Slovan
- Number: 77

Senior clubs
- Years: Team
- –: RK Budvanska Rivijera
- –: BM Ciudad Real
- 2013–2014: RK Celje
- 2014–2016: Csurgói KK
- 2016–2026: HSG Wetzlar
- 2026–: RD Slovan
National team
Years	Team	Apps	(Gls)
–	Montenegro	63	(112)

Stefan Čavor (born 3 November 1994) is a Montenegrin handball player for RD Slovan and the Montenegrin national team.
