= Gábor Herbert =

Hungarian handball player (born 1979)

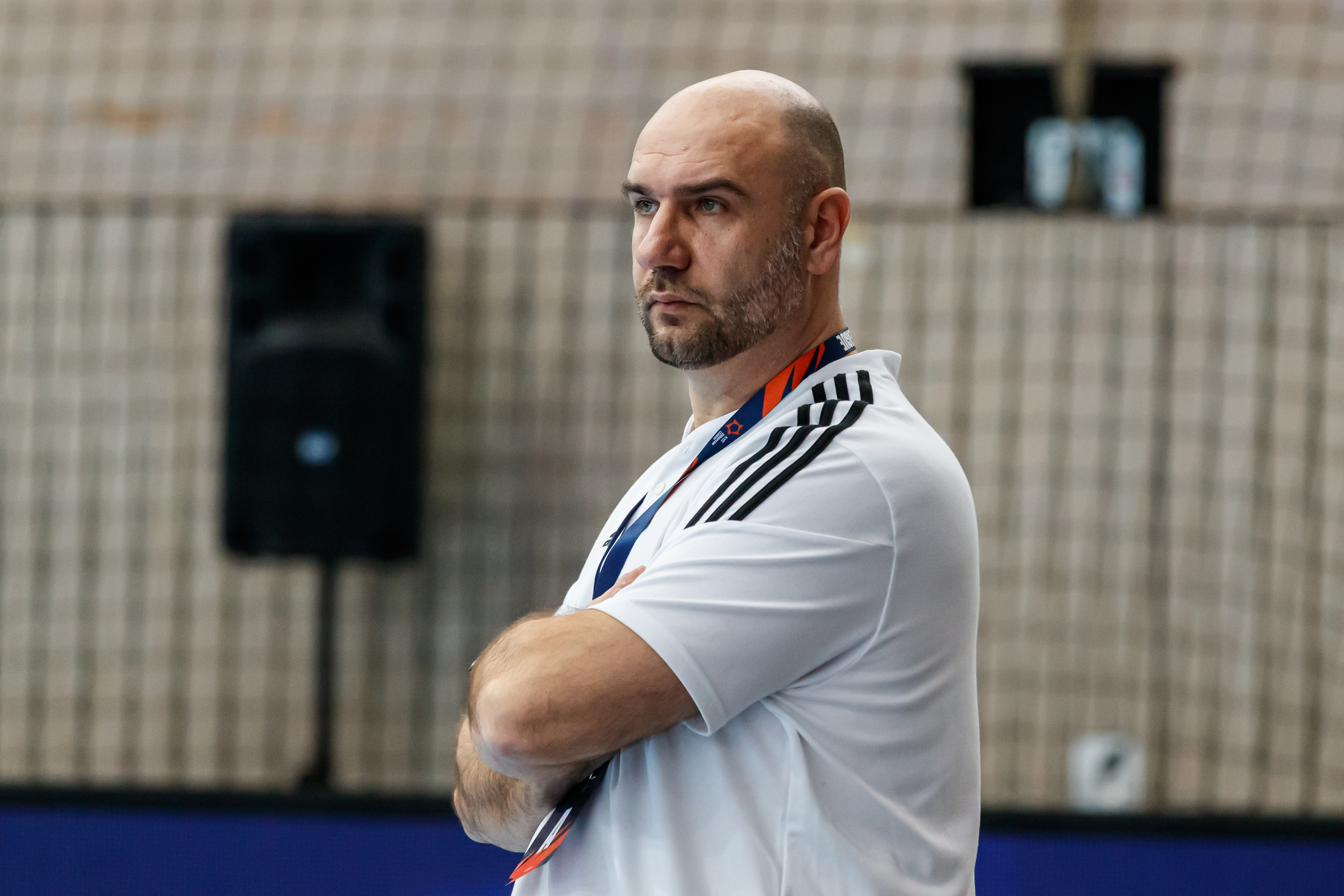

Personal information
- Full name: Gábor Herbert
- Nationality: Hungarian
- Born: 6 February 1979 (age 47) Komló, Hungary
- Height: 1.94 m (6 ft 4 in)

Sport
- Sport: Handball
- Position: Line Player

Senior clubs
- Years: Team
- –1999: SC Pick Szeged
- 1999–2001: Százhalombattai KE
- 2001–2005: ETO-SZESE Győr FKC
- 2005–2011: SC Pick Szeged
- 2011–2016: Csurgói KK
National team
Years	Team	Apps	(Gls)
–	Hungary	70	(26)

Teams managed
- 2022–: Váci NKSE
- Updated on 12 December 2012

Gábor Herbert (born 6 February 1979 in Komló) was a Hungarian handballer who played for Csurgói KK, SC Pick Szeged and the Hungarian national team. He is currently the head coach of Hungarian woman's club, Békéscsabai Előre NKSE.

== Achievements ==
- Nemzeti Bajnokság I:
  - Winner: 2007
  - Runner-up: 2006, 2008, 2009, 2010, 2011
- Magyar Kupa:
  - Winner: 2006, 2008
  - Runner-up: 2009, 2010
