= Darko Dimitrievski =

Macedonian handball player

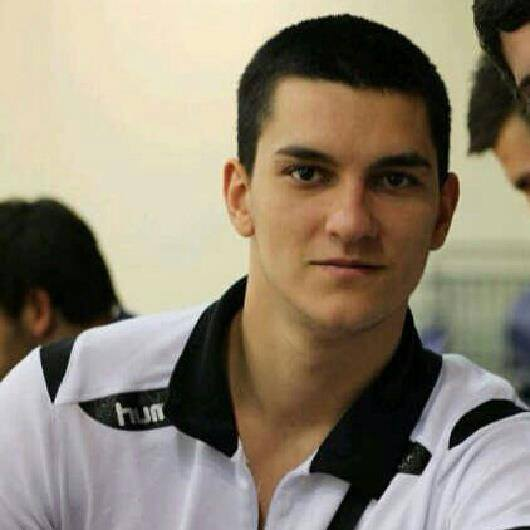
- A Macedonian handball player

Personal information
- Nationality: Macedonian
- Born: 16 May 1993 (age 33) Veles, Macedonia
- Height: 1.94 m (6 ft 4 in)

Sport
- Sport: Handball
- Position: Left back
- Current club: Eón Horneo Alicante
- Number: 10

Youth career
- Years: Team
- –: (North Macedonia) RK Borec
- –: (North Macedonia) MRK Vardar

Senior clubs
- Years: Team
- –2013: (North Macedonia) RK Kumanovo
- 2013–2014: Qatar Sports Club
- 2014: (Spain) BM Puerto Sagunto
- 2014–2015: (Spain) CB Ademar León
- 2015–2016: (Hungary) Csurgói KK
- 2016: (North Macedonia) RK Metalurg Skopje
- 2016–2017: (North Macedonia) RK Borec
- 2017–2018: (North Macedonia) RK Metalurg Skopje
- 2018: (Israel) Hapoel Ashdod
- 2018–2021: (Spain) Liberbank Cantabria Sinfín
- 2021–2022: (Germany) TV Emsdetten
- 2022–2024: (Spain) Recoletas Atlético Valladolid
- 2024–: (Spain) Eón Horneo Alicante
National team
- Years: Team
- 2015–: Macedonia

Darko Dimitrievski (Macedonian: Дарко Димитриевски; born 16 May 1993) is a Macedonian handball player who plays for Eón Horneo Alicante.

== Career ==
Darko started his professional career at 14 years old with MRK Vardar, where he played until he was 17 years old. The following season he was at RK Kumanovo. He made the jump to the handball elite at the age of 19 and in the 2013/14 season he made his debut with Qatar Sports Club.

In 2014 Dimitrievski moved to Spain in BM Puerto Sagunto and in season 2014-2015 he played for CB Ademar Leon. He left Spain and joined Hungarian handball team - Csurgoi KK in season 2015–2016.

Darko returned to Macedonia and signed for RK Matalurg but left after a month to join GRK Borec so that he can get more playing time. The 2016/17 season was very successful for Darko, he scored 148 goals in 19 games. After 13 years, GRK Borec finished 6th in the league.
