= Alem Toskić =

Serbian handball player (born 1982)

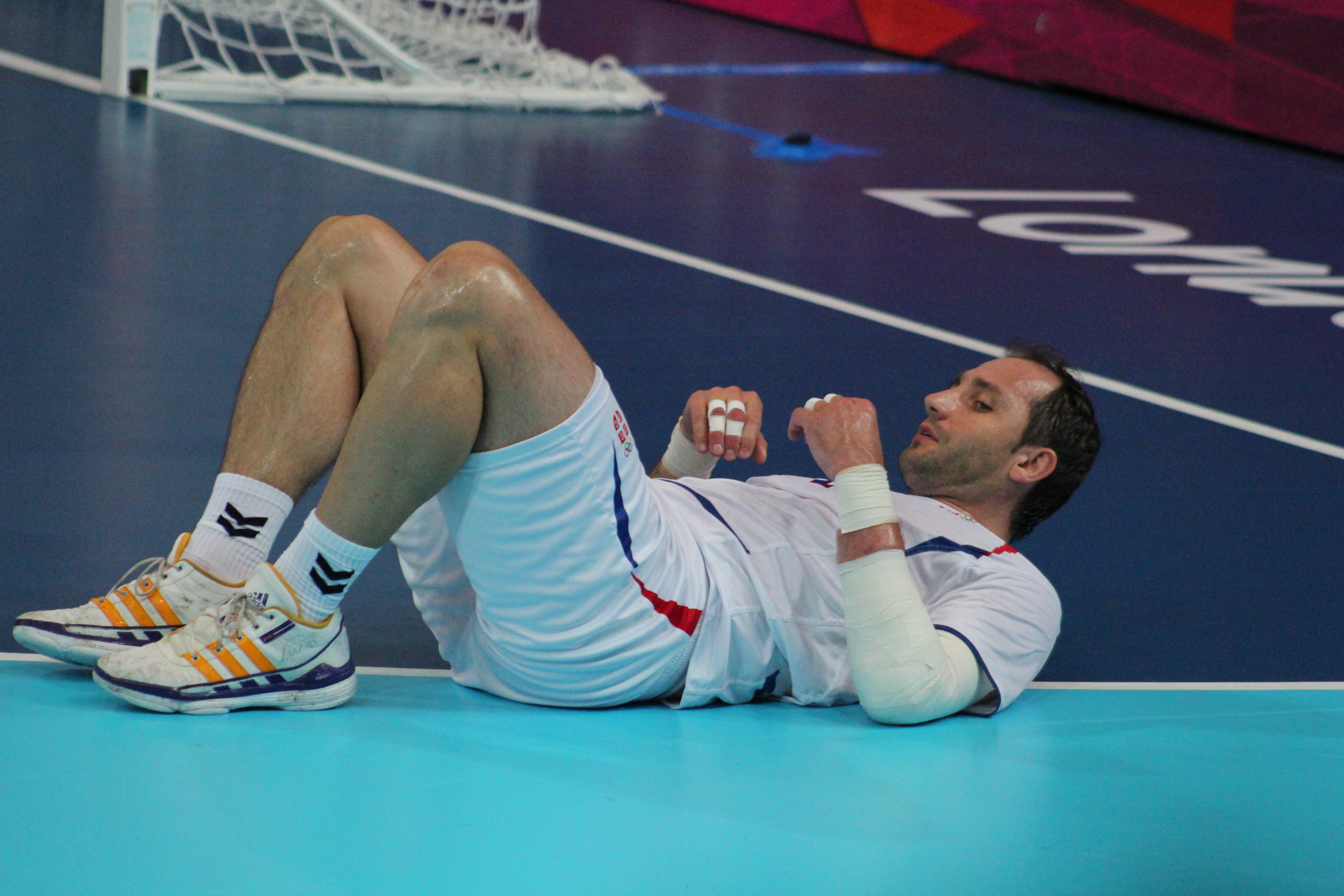
- Toskić in 2012

Personal information
- Full name: Alem Toskić
- Nationality: Serbian
- Born: 12 February 1982 (age 44) Priboj, SR Serbia, SFR Yugoslavia
- Height: 1.90 m (6 ft 3 in)

Sport
- Sport: Handball
- Position: Pivot
- Current club: RK Celje (head coach)

Senior clubs
- Years: Team
- –: Berane
- –: Fidelinka
- 2004–2005: RK Partizan
- 2005–2007: RK Zagreb
- 2007–2013: RK Celje
- 2013–2016: RK Vardar
- 2016–2018: RK Gorenje Velenje
- 2018–2020: Csurgói KK
National team
Years	Team		
2004–2006	Serbia and Montenegro		
2006–2014	Serbia	147	(302)

Teams managed
- 2019–2021: Csurgói KK
- 2021–2024: RK Celje
- 2025–: Csurgói KK
Medal record
Men's handball
Representing Serbia
European Championship
Silver medal – second place	2012 Serbia	Team

Alem Toskić (Serbian Cyrillic: Алем Тоскић; born 12 February 1982) is a Serbian handball coach and former player.

== Club career ==
In his home country, Toskić played for Fidelinka and Partizan (2004–2005), before moving abroad. He would go on to play for Zagreb (2005–2007), Celje (2007–2013), Vardar (2013–2016), Gorenje Velenje (2016–2018) and Csurgói KK (2018–2020).

== International career ==
Toskić represented Serbia and Montenegro at the 2005 World Championship and 2006 European Championship. He would later play for Serbia in seven major tournaments, winning the silver medal at the 2012 European Championship.

== Coaching career ==
In October 2019, Toskić began his coaching career as head coach of Csurgói KK.

== Honours ==
Celje

- Slovenian First League: 2007–08, 2009–10
- Slovenian Cup: 2009–10, 2011–12, 2012–13

Vardar

- Macedonian Handball Super League: 2014–15, 2015–16
- Macedonian Handball Cup: 2013–14, 2014–15, 2015–16
- SEHA League: 2013–14
