= Gregor Potočnik =

Slovenian handball player

Personal information
- Nationality: Slovenian
- Born: 22 August 1992 (age 34) Celje, Slovenia
- Height: 1.96 m (6 ft 5 in)

Sport
- Sport: Handball
- Position: Left back
- Current club: Csurgói KK
- Number: 21

Senior clubs
- Years: Team
- –2016: RK Celje
- 2016–2018: RK Gorenje Velenje
- 2018–2019: RK Zagreb
- 2019–2020: Csurgói KK
- 2020–: RK Trimo Trebnje
National team
Years	Team	Apps	(Gls)
–	Slovenia	14	(12)

Gregor Potočnik (born 22 August 1992) is a Slovenian handball player who plays for Csurgói KK and the Slovenian national team.

He participated at the 2018 European Men's Handball Championship.
