= Đorđe Golubović =

Serbian handball player (born 1992)

Personal information
- Full name: Đorđe Golubović
- Nationality: Serbian
- Born: 20 May 1992 (age 34) Belgrade, FR Yugoslavia
- Height: 1.92 m (6 ft 4 in)

Sport
- Sport: Handball
- Position: Right Back/wing

Senior clubs
- Years: Team
- 2008–2011: RK Partizan
- 2012–2013: CB Ademar León
- 2013–2014: Csurgói KK
- 2014–2015: AB Gijón Jovellanos
- 2015: RK Metalurg Skopje
- 2015: WKS Śląsk Wrocław
- 2016: RK Metaloplastika
- 2016–2017: HSC Suhr Aarau
- 2017–2018: HC Odorheiu Secuiesc
- 2018–2019: CSU Suceava
- 2020–2021: AC Diomidis Argous
- 2021–2022: RK Tineks Prolet
- 2022: HT Tatran Prešov
- 2023: AEK Athens

Đorđe Golubović (born May 20, 1992) is a Serbian handball player.
