= Nikola Kedžo =

Croatian handball player (born 1988)

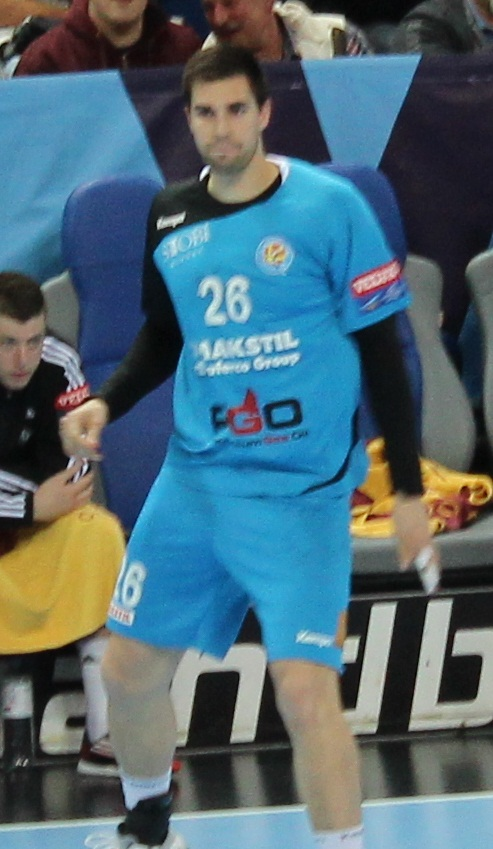

Personal information
- Nationality: Croatian
- Born: August 12, 1988 (age 38) Split, Croatia
- Height: 2.03 m (6 ft 8 in)

Sport
- Sport: Handball
- Position: Right Back
- Current club: Riihimäen Cocks
- Number: 26

Youth career
- Years: Team
- –: (Croatia) RK Kastela

Senior clubs
- Years: Team
- –: (Croatia) RK Kastela
- 2005–2006: (Spain) BM Ciudad Real
- 2006–2008: (Spain) BM Alcobendas
- 2008–2009: (Spain) SD Teucro
- 2009–2010: (Germany) HSG Düsseldorf
- 2010–2012: (Croatia) RK Nexe Našice
- 2012–2013: (Hungary) Csurgói KK
- 2013–2014: (North Macedonia) RK Metalurg Skopje
- 2014–2015: Qatar Sports Club
- 2015: (Poland) Gwardia Opole
- 2016: (Norway) ØIF Arendal
- 2016–2017: (Switzerland) BSV Bern Muri
- 2017–2019: (Romania) Steaua București
- 2019–2020: (Poland) SPR Tarnów
- 2022–: (Finland) Riihimäen Cocks

Nikola Kedžo (born 12 August 1988) is a Croatian handball player who plays for Riihimäen Cocks.
