= Klemen Cehte =

Slovenian handball player

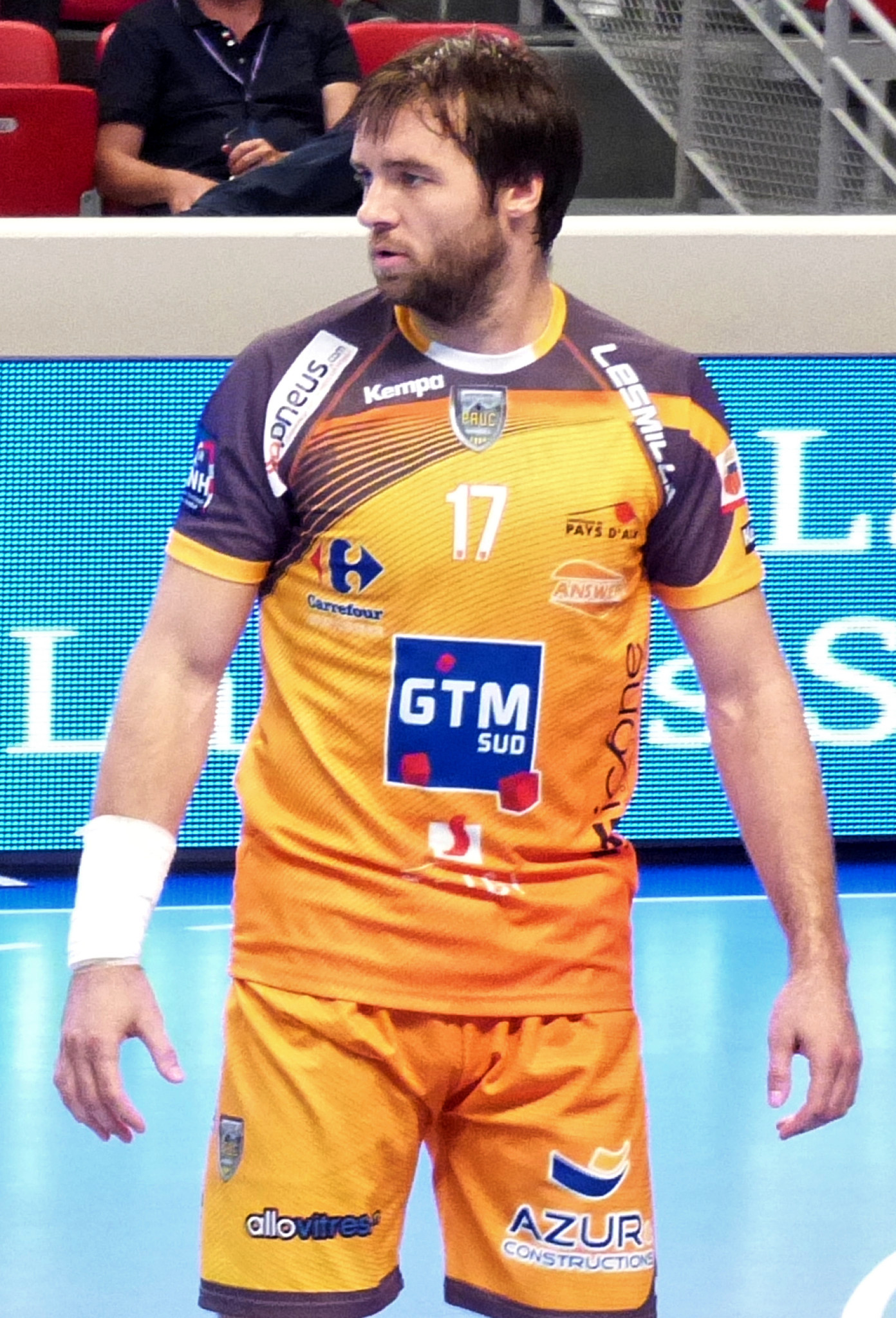
- Cehte in 2014

Personal information
- Nationality: Slovenian
- Born: 10 May 1986 (age 40) Brežice, SFR Yugoslavia
- Height: 1.96 m (6 ft 5 in)

Sport
- Sport: Handball
- Position: Left back
- Current club: Al Jazira Club

Youth career
- Years: Team
- 1994–2002: RK Krško

Senior clubs
- Years: Team
- 2002–2003: MRD Dobova
- 2003–2007: RK Krško
- 2007–2009: RK Trimo Trebnje
- 2009–2014: RK Gorenje Velenje
- 2014: Al Sadd SC
- 2014–2015: Pays d'Aix Université Club
- 2015–2017: Al Shabab
- 2017–2020: Csurgói KK
- 2020–2022: HSG Bärnbach/Köflach
- 2022–: Al Jazira Club
National team
Years	Team	Apps	(Gls)
–	Slovenia	46	(110)

Klemen Cehte (born 10 May 1986) is a Slovenian handball player who plays for Al Jazira Club.

His younger brother, Nejc Cehte, is also a professional handball player.
