= Egon Hanusz =

Hungarian handball player (born 1997)

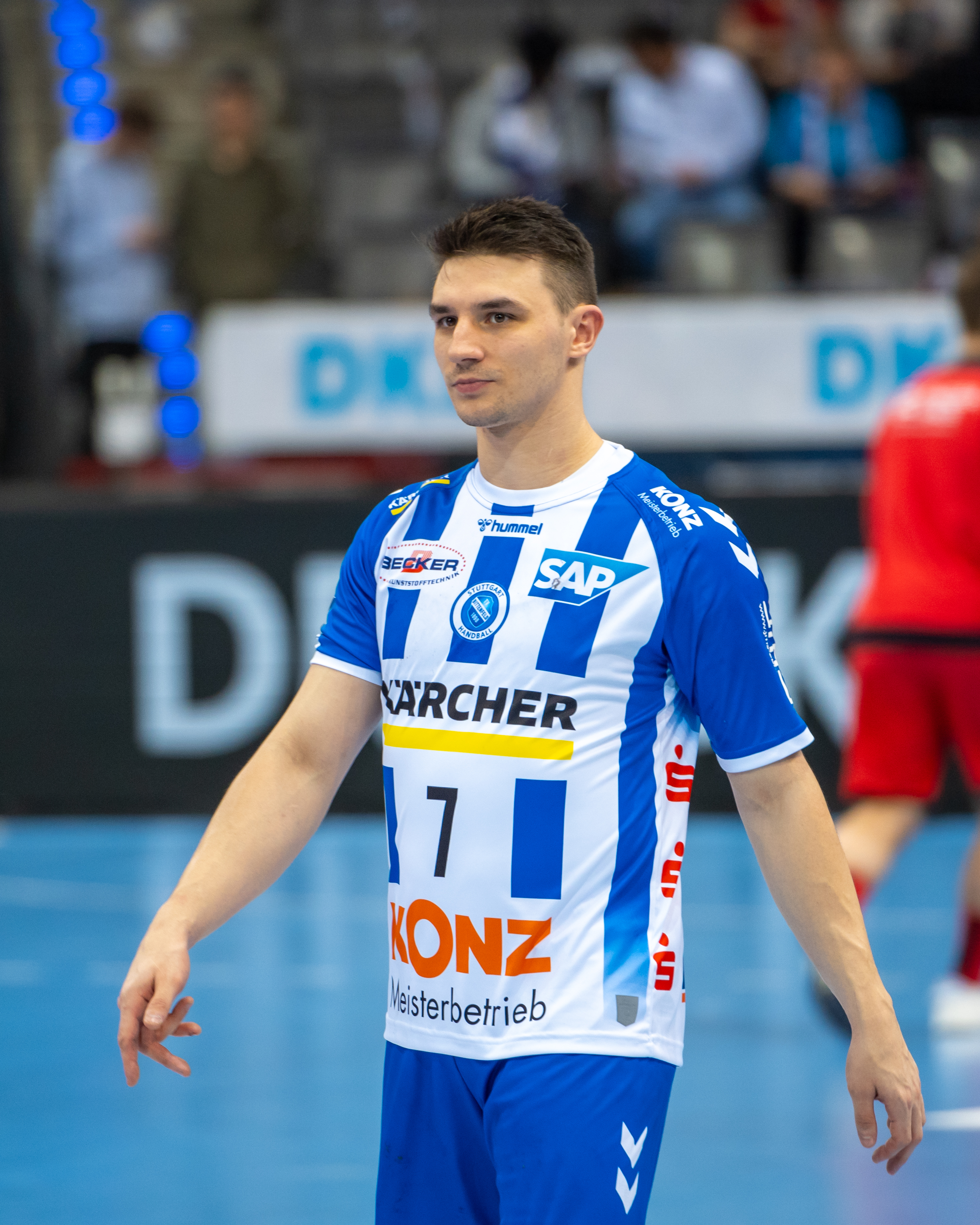
- Hanusz in 2024

Personal information
- Nationality: Hungarian
- Born: 25 September 1997 (age 29) Nagyatád, Hungary
- Height: 1.77 m (5 ft 10 in)

Sport
- Sport: Handball
- Position: Centre back
- Current club: Cesson Rennes MHB
- Number: 7

Youth career
- Years: Team
- 2010–2015: Csurgói KK

Senior clubs
- Years: Team
- 2015–2021: Csurgói KK
- 2021–2024: TVB Stuttgart
- 2024–2025: S.L. Benfica
- 2025–: Cesson Rennes MHB
National team
Years	Team	Apps	(Gls)
2020–	Hungary	73	(108)

Egon Hanusz (born 25 September 1997) is a Hungarian handballer for Cesson Rennes MHB and the Hungarian national team.
