= Barys Pukhouski =

Belarusian handball player (born 1987)

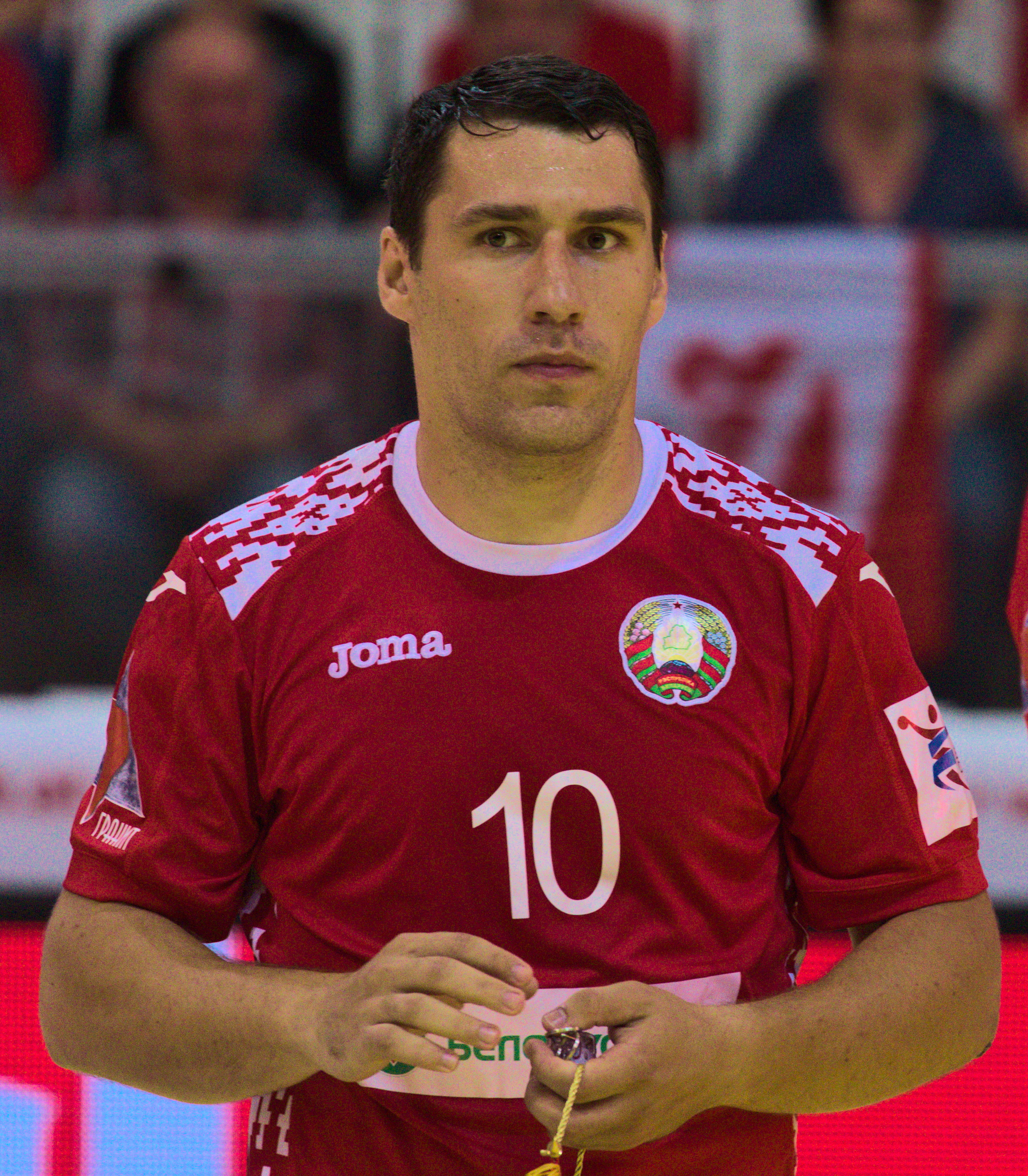

Personal information
- Nationality: Belarusian
- Born: 3 January 1987 (age 39) Malaryta, Belarus
- Height: 1.88 m (6 ft 2 in)

Sport
- Sport: Handball
- Position: Centre back

Senior clubs
- Years: Team
- 2002–2009: SKA Minsk
- 2009–2012: Dinamo Minsk
- 2012–2013: SKA Minsk
- 2013–2015: Csurgói KK
- 2015–2022: HC Motor Zaporizhzhia
- 2022: → SKA Minsk
- 2022–2025: RK Vojvodina
National team
Years	Team	Apps	(Gls)
2005–2022	Belarus	203	(845)

Barys Pukhouski (Belarusian: Барыс Пухоўскі; born 3 January 1987) is a former Belarusian handball player.
