= Péter Tatai =

Hungarian handball player (born 1983)

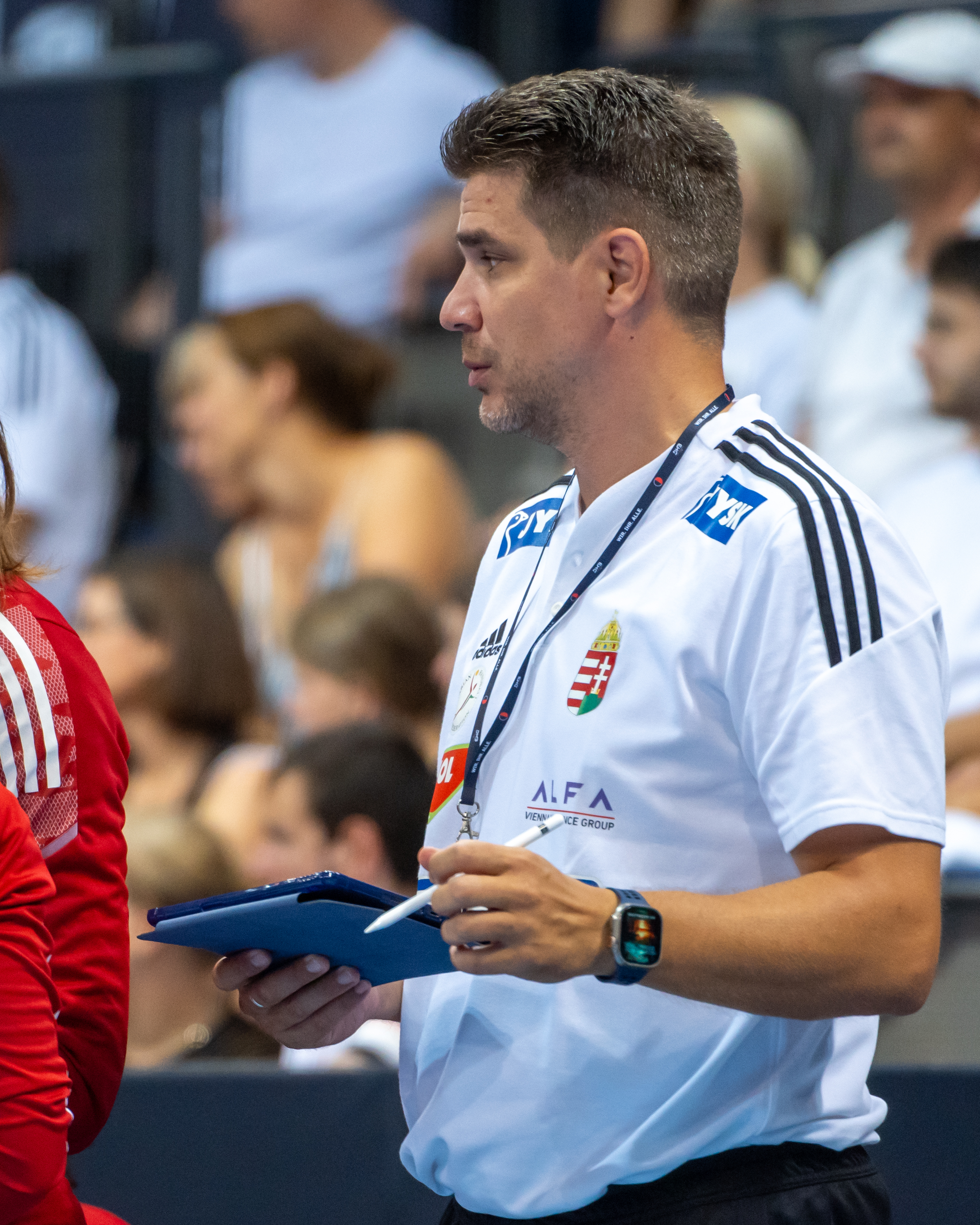

Personal information
- Nationality: Hungarian
- Born: 23 June 1983 (age 43) Győr, Hungary
- Height: 1.95 m (6 ft 5 in)

Sport
- Sport: Handball
- Position: Goalkeeper
- Current club: Csurgói KK
- Number: 12

Senior clubs
- Years: Team
- 2001–2005: ETO-SZESE Győr FKC
- 2005–2008: Veszprém KC
- 2008–2010: Dunkerque HB
- 2010–2014: SC Pick Szeged
- 2014–2016: HCM Minaur Baia Mare
- 2016: Frisch Auf Göppingen
- 2016–2020: TuS Nettelstedt-Lübbecke
- 2020–2022: Csurgói KK
- 2022–2023: Tatai AC
- 2023–2024: KK Ajka
National team
Years	Team	Apps	(Gls)
2001–2014	Hungary	90	(0)

Péter Tatai (born 23 June 1983) is a Hungarian handball goalkeeper who plays for Csurgói KK. He is a former Hungarian international.

== Achievements ==
- Nemzeti Bajnokság I:
  - Winner: 2006, 2008
  - Silver Medalist: 2007, 2011, 2012, 2013, 2014
- Magyar Kupa
  - Winner: 2007
  - Finalist: 2006, 2008, 2012, 2013, 2014
- Romanian National League:
  - Winner: 2015
- Romanian Cup:
  - Winner: 2015
- EHF Cup Winners' Cup:
  - Winner: 2008
- EHF Cup:
  - Winner: 2014
- EHF Champions League:
  - Semifinalist: 2006
- EHF Champions Trophy:
  - Finalist: 2008
