= Vladyslav Ostroushko =

Ukrainian handball player (born 1986)

Personal information
- Nationality: Ukrainian
- Born: 5 March 1986 (age 40) Cherkasy, Ukraine
- Height: 2.01 m (6 ft 7 in)

Sport
- Sport: Handball
- Position: Left back
- Current club: RK Eurofarm Rabotnik
- Number: 32
National team
Years	Team	Apps	(Gls)
–	Ukraine	49	(123)

Vladyslav Ostroushko (born 5 March 1986) is a Ukrainian handball player for RK Eurofarm Rabotnik and the Ukrainian national team.

He represented Ukraine at the 2020 European Men's Handball Championship.
