= Kosta Savić =

Bosnian handball player

Personal information
- Born: 15 December 1987 (age 38) Brčko, Bosnia and Herzegovina
- Height: 1.92 m (6 ft 4 in)

Sport
- Sport: Handball
- Position: Right back
- Number: 33
National team
Years	Team	Apps	(Gls)
–	Bosnia and Herzegovina	32	(52)
- Updated on 12 May 2015

Kosta Savić (born 15 December 1987) is a Bosnian handball player. Savić started his career in Lokomotiva Brčko, and later played for Slovenian club Krško, Bosna Sarajevo and French club PAUC handball.
