= Antonio Kovačević =

Croatian handball player (born 1987)

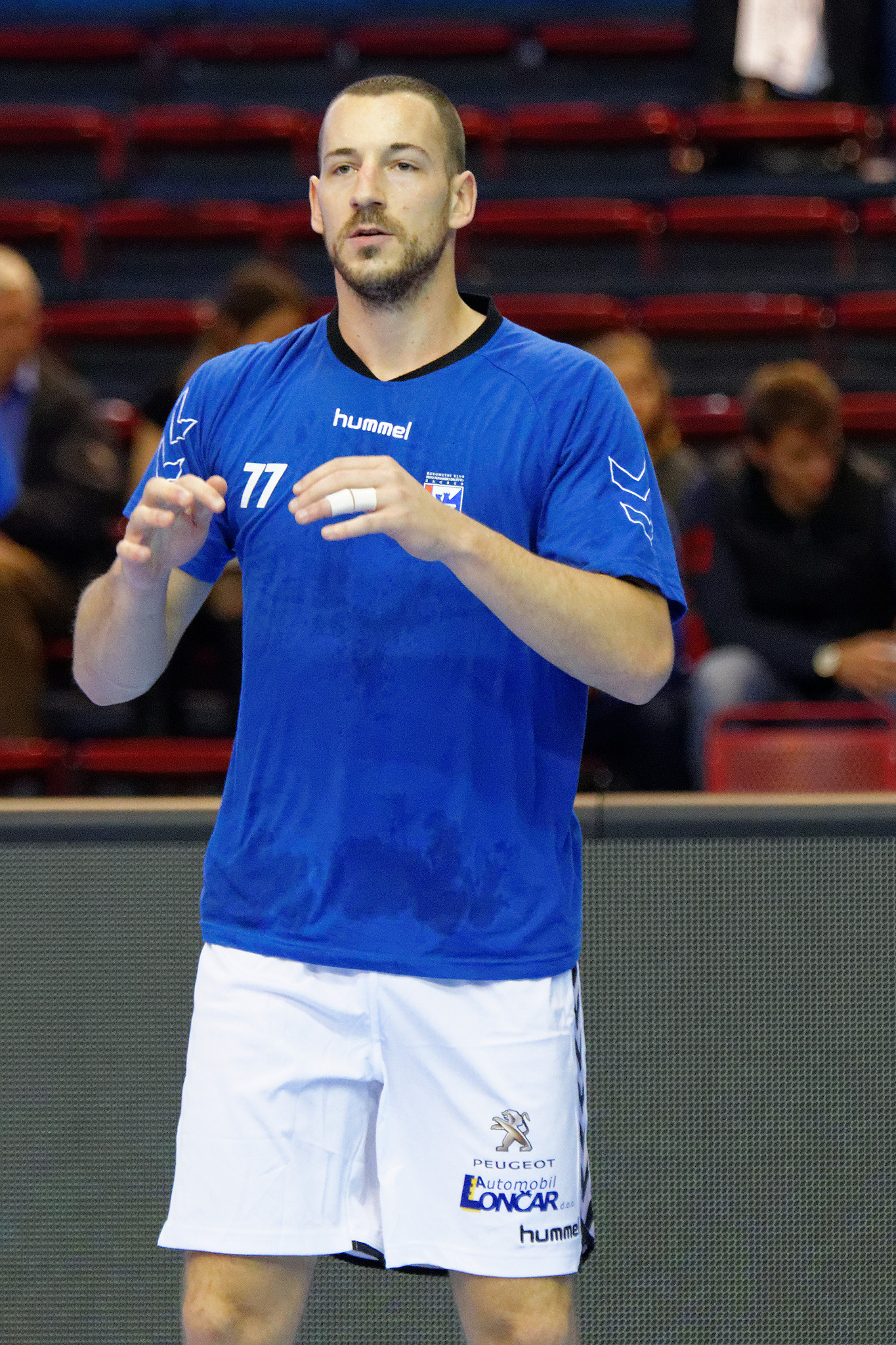

Personal information
- Nationality: Croatian
- Born: 21 May 1987 (age 39) Zagreb, SFR Yugoslavia
- Height: 1.90 m (6 ft 3 in)

Sport
- Sport: Handball
- Position: Left wing
- Current club: Csurgói KK
- Number: 77

Senior clubs
- Years: Team
- –2016: (Croatia) RK Zagreb
- 2016–2017: (Croatia) RK Dubrava
- 2017–2018: (Romania) HC Odorheiu Secuiesc
- 2018–: (Hungary) Csurgói KK
National team
Years	Team	Apps	(Gls)
–	Croatia	4	(4)
Medal record
European Championship
Silver medal – second place	2010 Austria
Bronze medal – third place	2016 Poland

Antonio Kovačević (born 21 May 1987) is a Croatian handball player who plays for Csurgói KK and the Croatian national team.

He competed at the 2016 European Men's Handball Championship.
