= Mirko Herceg =

Bosnian handball player

Personal information
- Born: 26 February 1992 (age 34) Mostar, Bosnia and Herzegovina, Yugoslavia
- Height: 1.95 m (6 ft 5 in)

Sport
- Sport: Handball
- Position: Left back
- Current club: Csurgói KK
- Number: 10
National team
| Years | Team | Apps | (Gls) |
| – | Bosnia and Herzegovina | 5 | (7) |

Mirko Herceg (born 26 February 1992) is a Bosnian handball player for Csurgói KK and the Bosnian national team.

He represented Bosnia and Herzegovina at the 2020 European Men's Handball Championship.
