= Tibor Gazdag =

Hungarian handball player (born 1991)

Personal information
- Nationality: Hungarian
- Born: 7 August 1991 (age 35) Debrecen, Hungary
- Height: 1.87 m (6 ft 2 in)

Sport
- Sport: Handball
- Position: Left wing
- Current club: Csurgói KK
- Number: 13

Senior clubs
- Years: Team
- 2009–2010: PLER KC
- 2010–2013: Gyöngyösi KK
- 2013-: Csurgói KK
National team
Years	Team	Apps	(Gls)
2014–	Hungary	15	(23)

Tibor Gazdag (born 7 August 1991) is a Hungarian handballer who plays for Csurgói KK and the Hungarian national team.
