= Ádám Tóth (handballer) =

Hungarian handball player (born 1995)

Personal information
- Nationality: Hungarian
- Born: 18 October 1995 (age 31) Miskolc, Hungary
- Height: 1.77 m (5 ft 10 in)

Sport
- Sport: Handball
- Position: Right wing
- Current club: Ferencvárosi TC
- Number: 17
National team
Years	Team	Apps	(Gls)
2020–	Hungary	11	(4)

Ádám Tóth (born 8 September 1995) is a Hungarian handball player for Ferencvárosi TC and the Hungarian national team.

He represented Hungary at the 2020 European Men's Handball Championship.
