= Tamás Borsos (handballer) =

Hungarian handball player (born 1990)

Personal information
- Nationality: Hungarian
- Born: 13 June 1990 (age 36) Nagyatád, Hungary
- Height: 2.02 m (6 ft 8 in)

Sport
- Sport: Handball
- Position: Left back
- Current club: Carbonex-Komló
National team
Years	Team	Apps	(Gls)
2015-	Hungary	12	(1)

Tamás Borsos (born 13 September 1990) is a Hungarian handball player. He plays for Carbonex-Komló and the Hungarian national team.

He competed at the 2016 European Men's Handball Championship.
