= 2020–21 SC Pick Szeged season =

SC Pick Szeged
2021–21 season
- Chairman: Dr. Ernő Péter Szűcs
- Manager: (Spain) Juan Carlos Pastor
- Nemzeti Bajnokság I: 1st
- Hungarian Cup: Runners-up
- EHF Champions League: Play-offs
Home colours	Away colours

The 2020–21 season will be SC Pick Szeged's 45th competitive and consecutive season in the Nemzeti Bajnokság I and 59th year in existence as a handball club.

== Players ==
=== Squad information ===
Source: MOL-Pick Szeged in 2020-20 EHF CL

Goalkeepers

- 1 (Hungary) Barnabás Marczinka
- 16 (Hungary) Roland Mikler
- 32 (Croatia) Mirko Alilović
- 77 (Serbia) Luka Krivokapić

Left Wingers

- 8 (Sweden) Jonas Källman (c)
- 10 (Iceland) Stefán Rafn Sigurmannsson
- 39 (Hungary) Brúnó Bajusz
- 42 (Slovakia) Martin Straňovský

Right Wingers

- 13 (Hungary) Dániel Kecskés
- 17 (Serbia) Bogdan Radivojević
- 24 (Slovenia) Mario Šoštarič
- 93 (Hungary) Benjámin Szilágyi

Line players

- 22 (Slovenia) Matej Gaber
- 27 (Hungary) Bence Bánhidi
- 45 (Hungary) Miklós Rosta
- 23 (Hungary) József Tóth

Left Backs

- 9 (Hungary) Richárd Bodó
- 15 (Slovenia) Nik Henigman
- 51 (Slovenia) Borut Mačkovšek
- 90 (Romania) Dániel Fekete
- 91 (Hungary) Patrik Hegedűs

Central Backs

- 14 (Spain) Joan Cañellas
- 23 (Hungary) Bence Vetési
- 35 (Hungary) Barnabás Rea
- 44 (Slovenia) Dean Bombač
- 89 (Russia) Dmitry Zhitnikov

Right Backs

- 7 (Croatia) Luka Stepančić
- 37 (Czech Republic) Stanislav Kašpárek

== Competitions ==
=== Overview ===
Win Draw Loss

Competition	First match	Last match	Starting round	Final position	Record							
Competition	First match	Last match	Starting round	Final position	Pld	W	D	L	GF	GA	GD	Win %
Nemzeti Bajnokság I	2 September 2020	5 June 2021	Matchday 1	Winners	28	25	0	3	859	715	+144	89.29
Magyar Kupa	24 March 2021	12 April 2021	Fifth round	Runners-up	3	2	0	1	96	71	+25	66.67
EHF Champions League	23 September 2020	7 April 2021	Group stage	Play-offs	16	6	0	10	374	395	−21	37.50
Total					47	33	0	14	1,329	1,181	+148	70.21

Last updated: 6 June 2021
Source: nemzetisport.hu
