= 2022–23 Nemzeti Bajnokság I (men's handball) =

Season of a handball league In Hungary

Nemzeti Bajnokság I
- Season: 2022–23
- Dates: 31 August 2022 – 9 June 2023
- Champion: Telekom Veszprém; 27th title
- Relegated: HÉP-Cegléd; Budai Farkasok-Rév
- Champions League: Telekom Veszprém; Pick Szeged
- European League: MOL-Tatabánya KC
- European Cup: Ferencvárosi TC
- Matches played: 185
- Goals scored: 10,938 (59.12 per match)
- All statistics correct as of 14 August 2023.

The 2022–23 Nemzeti Bajnokság I (known as the K&H férfi kézilabda liga for sponsorship reasons) was the 72nd season of the Nemzeti Bajnokság I, the top men's handball league in Hungary. A total of fourteen teams contest this season's league, which began on 31 August 2022 and will conclude on 9 June 2023.

Telekom Veszprém won their twenty seventh title.

== Teams ==
=== Team changes ===
Promoted from 2021–22 Nemzeti Bajnokság I/B	Relegated from 2021–22 Nemzeti Bajnokság I
Budai Farkasok-Rév; HÉP-Cegléd	SBS-Eger; Kecskeméti TE-Piroska szörp

=== Arenas and locations ===
Location of teams in 2022–23 Nemzeti Bajnokság I

The following 14 clubs compete in the Nemzeti Bajnokság I during the 2022–23 season:

Team	Location	Arena	Capacity	2021–22
Balatonfüredi KSE	Balatonfüred	Szabadidőközpont	712	3rd
Budai Farkasok KKUK	Budaörs	Városi Uszoda Sportcsarnok és Strand	905	1st (NB I/B)
Budakalász FKC	Budakalász	Városi Sportcsarnok	400	8th
Csurgói KK	Csurgó	Sótonyi László Sportcsarnok	1,200	9th
Ceglédi KKSE	Abony	Varga István Városi Sportcsarnok^{1}		2nd (NB I/B)
Dabas KK	Dabas	OBO Aréna	1,920	11th
Ferencvárosi TC	Budapest, IX. ker	Elek Gyula Aréna	1,300	4th
Gyöngyösi KK	Gyöngyös	Dr. Fejes András Sportcsarnok	1,100	6th
Komlói BSK	Komló	Sportközpont	800	7th
NEKA	Balatonboglár	NEKA Csarnok	678	12th
SC Pick Szeged	Szeged	Pick Aréna	8,143	1st
Tatabánya KC	Tatabánya	Tatabányai Multifunkcionális Sportcsarnok	6,200	5th
Veszprém KC	Veszprém	Veszprém Aréna	5,096	2nd
Veszprém KKFT	Veszprém	Március 15. úti Sportcsarnok	2,200	10th

Clubs that play in the 2022–23 SEHA League

1. Due to the renovation of Gál József Sportcsarnok in Cegléd, Ceglédi KKSE played home matches at the Varga István Városi Sportcsarnok in Abony.

== Regular season ==
=== Standings ===
Pos	Team	Pld	W	D	L	GF	GA	GD	Pts	Qualification or relegation
1	OTP Bank-Pick Szeged	26	25	0	1	938	713	+225	50	Qualification to the Finals and advance for Champions League group phase
2	Telekom Veszprém	26	24	1	1	1008	747	+261	49	Qualification to the Finals and advance for Champions League group phase
3	Grundfos Tatabánya KC	26	19	1	6	802	703	+99	39	Qualification for European League group phase
4	FTC	26	18	1	7	876	804	+72	37	Qualification for European Cup second round
5	Balatonfüredi KSE	26	13	3	10	736	709	+27	29	
6	Csurgói KK	26	12	3	11	716	721	−5	27	
7	HE-DO B. Braun Gyöngyös	26	12	2	12	729	751	−22	26	
8	HSA NEKA	26	10	3	13	694	720	−26	23 (Note: HSA NEKA is ahead of Dabasi KC on head-to-head results: 50–47.)	
9	Dabasi KC	26	11	1	14	726	780	−54	23	
10	CYEB-Budakalász	26	9	4	13	700	768	−68	22	
11	Sport36-Komló	26	9	4	13	704	782	−78	22	
12	Fejér-B.Á.L. Veszprém	28	5	2	21	732	887	−155	12	
13	HÉP-Cegléd (R)	28	4	2	22	716	844	−128	10	Relegation to Nemzeti Bajnokság I/B
14	Budai Farkasok-Rév (R)	26	2	0	24	675	824	−149	4	Relegation to Nemzeti Bajnokság I/B

Source: Hungarian Handball Federation (in Hungarian), Flashscore
Rules for classification: 1) Points; 2) Head-to-head points; 3) Goal difference; 4) Head-to-head goal difference; 5) Goals scored; 6) Matches won; 7) Draw (Note: Head-to-head record is used only after all the matches between the teams in question have been played)
(R) Relegated

== Finals ==
Team 1	Series	Team 2	Game 1	Game 2	Game 3
OTP Bank-Pick Szeged	1–2	Telekom Veszprém	31–25	27–34	27–31

=== Game 1 ===
2 June 2023; 18:45	OTP Bank-Pick Szeged	31–25	Telekom Veszprém	Pick Aréna, Szeged; Attendance: 6,176; Referees: Andorka, Hucker
2 June 2023; 18:45	Blonz 7	(15–11)	Lauge 4	Pick Aréna, Szeged; Attendance: 6,176; Referees: Andorka, Hucker
2 June 2023; 18:45	2× (yellow card) 4× (suspension)	Report	1× (yellow card) 3× (suspension)	Pick Aréna, Szeged; Attendance: 6,176; Referees: Andorka, Hucker

=== Game 2 ===
5 June 2023; 18:30	Telekom Veszprém	34–27	OTP Bank-Pick Szeged	Veszprém Aréna, Veszprém; Attendance: 5,100; Referees: Hargitai, Markó
5 June 2023; 18:30	Elísson 9	(18–17)	Blonz 6	Veszprém Aréna, Veszprém; Attendance: 5,100; Referees: Hargitai, Markó
5 June 2023; 18:30	1× (yellow card) 4× (suspension)	Report	2× (yellow card) 5× (suspension)	Veszprém Aréna, Veszprém; Attendance: 5,100; Referees: Hargitai, Markó

=== Game 3 ===
9 June 2023; 20:30	OTP Bank-Pick Szeged	27–31	Telekom Veszprém	Pick Aréna, Szeged; Attendance: 7,695; Referees: Bócz, Wiedemann
9 June 2023; 20:30	Blonz 6	(14–12)	Vailupau 9	Pick Aréna, Szeged; Attendance: 7,695; Referees: Bócz, Wiedemann
9 June 2023; 20:30	1× (yellow card)	Report	4× (suspension)	Pick Aréna, Szeged; Attendance: 7,695; Referees: Bócz, Wiedemann

Telekom Veszprém won the Finals, 2–1 on series.

2022–23 Nemzeti Bajnokság I
Champion

27th title

Alilović, Krivokapic, Mikler (goalkeepers), Bánhidi (c), Blonz, Bodó, Bombač, Frimmel, Gaber, Garciandia, Hegedűs, Henigman,
Ludmán, Mačkovšek, Martins, Radivojević, Radvánszki, Rea, Rosta, Šoštarić, Stepančić, Szilágyi, Tønnesen, Varga
Head coach: Juan Carlos Pastor, Assistant coach: Marko Krivokapić

== Statistics ==
=== Number of teams by counties and regions ===
Number of teams by counties
Pos.	County (megye)	No. of teams	Teams
1	Pest	4	Budai Farkasok KKUK, Budakalász FKC, Ceglédi KKSE and Dabas KK
2	Veszprém	3	Balatonfüredi KSE, Veszprém KC and Veszprém KKFT
3	Somogy	2	Csurgói KK and NEKA
4	Baranya	1	Komlói BSK
4	Budapest	1	Ferencvárosi TC
4	Csongrád-Csanád	1	SC Pick Szeged
4	Heves	1	Gyöngyösi KK
4	Komárom-Esztergom	1	Tatabánya KC

Number of teams by regions
Transdanubia	Central Hungary	Great Plain and North
Balatonfüred; Csurgói KK; Komlói BSK; NEKA; Tatabánya KC; Veszprém KC; Veszprém KKFT	Budai Farkasok KKUK; Budakalász FKC; Ceglédi KKSE; Dabas KK; Ferencvárosi TC	Gyöngyösi KK; SC Pick Szeged
7 Teams	5 Teams	2 Teams

== See also ==
- 2022–23 Magyar Kupa
- 2022–23 Nemzeti Bajnokság I/B
- 2022–23 Nemzeti Bajnokság II
