= 2021–22 Nemzeti Bajnokság I (men's handball) =

Nemzeti Bajnokság I
- Season: 2021–22
- Dates: 27 August 2021 – 11 June 2022
- Champion: Pick Szeged; 5th title
- Relegated: SBS-Eger; Kecskeméti TE
- Champions League: Pick Szeged; Telekom Veszprém
- European League: Balatonfüredi KSE; FTC; Fejér-B.Á.L. Veszprém
- Matches played: 184
- Goals scored: 10,719 (58.26 per match)
- Top goalscorer: Bence Nagy (171 goals)

The 2021–22 Nemzeti Bajnokság I (known as the K&H férfi kézilabda liga for sponsorship reasons) was the 71st season of the Nemzeti Bajnokság I, the top men's handball league in Hungary. A total of fourteen teams contest this season's league, which began on 27 August 2021 and will conclude on 11 June 2022.

Pick Szeged won their fifth title.

== Teams ==
Location of teams in 2021–22 Nemzeti Bajnokság I

=== Team changes ===
Promoted from 2020–21 Nemzeti Bajnokság I/B	Relegated from 2020–21 Nemzeti Bajnokság I
NEKA; Kecskeméti TE-Piroska szörp	Ceglédi KKSE; Orosházi FKSE - Linamar

=== Arenas and locations ===
The following 14 clubs compete in the Nemzeti Bajnokság I during the 2021–22 season:

Team	Location	Arena	Capacity
Balatonfüredi KSE	Balatonfüred	Szabadidőközpont	712
Budakalász FKC	Budakalász	Városi Sportcsarnok	400
Csurgói KK	Csurgó	Sótonyi László Sportcsarnok	1,200
Dabas KK	Dabas	OBO Aréna	1,920
Eger-Eszterházy SzSE	Eger	Kemény Ferenc Sportcsarnok	885
Ferencvárosi TC	Budapest, IX. ker	Elek Gyula Aréna	1,300
Gyöngyösi KK	Gyöngyös	Dr. Fejes András Sportcsarnok	1,100
Kecskeméti TE	Kecskemét	Messzi István Sportcsarnok	1,900
Komlói BSK	Komló	Sportközpont	800
NEKA	Balatonboglár	NEKA Csarnok	678
SC Pick Szeged	Szeged	Városi Sportcsarnok; Pick Aréna	3,600; 8,143
Tatabánya KC	Tatabánya	Földi Imre Sportcsarnok; Tatabányai Multifunkcionális Sportcsarnok	1,000; 6,200
Veszprém KC	Veszprém	Veszprém Aréna	5,096
Veszprém KKFT	Veszprém	Veszprém Aréna; Március 15. úti Sportcsarnok	5,096; 2,200

Clubs that play in the 2021–22 SEHA League

=== Personnel and kits ===
All teams are obligated to have the logo of the Hungarian national sports betting brand Tippmix sponsors since 2015, their logo is therefore present on all team kits.

Team	Head coach	Captain	Kit manufacturer	Main sponsor
Balatonfüredi KSE	(Hungary) László György	(Hungary) László Kemény	2Rule	77 Elektronika, Takarékbank
Budakalász FKC	(Hungary) István Csoknyai	(Hungary) Dániel Váczi	2Rule	
Csurgói KK	(Hungary) Norbert Baranyai	(Hungary) Péter Tatai	Hummel	PriMont, MenDan****, KLH Masters
Dabas KK	(Hungary) Győző Tomori	(Hungary) Balázs Holló	Hummel	OBO Bettermann, Volvo Galéria Budapest
Eger-Eszterházy SzSE	(Hungary) Edmond Tóth	(Hungary) Gergő Kiss	Hummel	SBS
Ferencvárosi TC	(Hungary) Attila Horváth	(Hungary) Bálint Pordán	Nike	Lidl
Gyöngyösi KK	(Hungary) Ákos Sándor / (Hungary) Dániel Kiss	(Hungary) Tibor Gerdán	Hummel	B. Braun, HE-DO
Kecskeméti TE	(Hungary) József Bencze		Kempa	Piroska szörp, Vitamin360
Komlói BSK	(Hungary) Bálint Kilvinger	(Serbia) Filip Sunajko	Zeus	Sport36
NEKA	(Hungary) László Sótonyi	(Hungary) Márton Dely	Hummel	NEKA
SC Pick Szeged	(Spain) Juan Carlos Pastor	(Hungary) Bence Bánhidi	Adidas	Pick, OTP Bank, SMP Solutions
Tatabánya KC	(Serbia) Dragan Đukić	(Hungary) Ádám Juhász	Jako	MOL, Grundfos
Veszprém KC	(Serbia) Momir Ilić	(Denmark) Rasmus Lauge	2Rule	Telekom, Euroaszfalt
Veszprém KKFT	(Hungary) József Éles	(Hungary) Mátyás Kristóf	Erima	Fejér-B.Á.L., Völgység Agrár

=== Managerial changes ===
Team	Outgoing manager	Manner of departure	Date of vacancy	Position in table	Replaced by	Date of appointment	Ref.
Veszprém KC	(Spain) David Davis	Sacked	7 June 2021	Pre-season	(Serbia) Momir Ilić	1 July 2021	
Csurgói KK	(Serbia) Alem Toskić	Signed by Celje	10 June 2021	Pre-season	(Spain) Mariano Ortega	14 June 2021	
Tatabánya KC	(Serbia) Vladan Matić	Resigned	23 October 2021	9th	(Hungary) Jakab Sibalin (caretaker)	23 October 2021	
Csurgói KK	(Spain) Mariano Ortega	Mutual consent	2 November 2021	12th	(Hungary) Norbert Baranyai (caretaker)	2 November 2021	
Tatabánya KC	(Hungary) Jakab Sibalin	End of caretaker spell	2 November 2021	10th	(Serbia) Dragan Đukić	2 November 2021	
Veszprém KKFT	(Hungary) Csaba Tombor	Sacked	10 March 2022	12th	(Hungary) József Éles (interim)	10 March 2021	
Gyöngyösi KK	(Hungary) Csaba Konkoly	Sacked	21 March 2022	8th	(Hungary) Ákos Sándor / (Hungary) Dániel Kiss (caretaker)	21 March 2021	

== Format ==
The competition format for the 2021–22 season consists of 14 teams each playing a total of 26 matches, half at home and half away, After the Regular season, the championship result will be determined in 3–14. placed ranking teams. The teams finishing in 13th and 14th place will be eliminated in the Nemzeti Bajnokság I/B. 1st and 2nd place in the Regular season will play a rematch based championship final. The career choice for the first match of the final is 2nd place in the regular season.

== Regular season ==
=== Standings ===
Pos	Team	Pld	W	D	L	GF	GA	GD	Pts	Qualification or relegation
1	Telekom Veszprém	26	24	2	0	931	687	+244	50	Qualification to the Finals and advance for Champions League group phase
2	Pick Szeged	26	23	1	2	913	654	+259	47	Qualification to the Finals and advance for Champions League group phase
3	Balatonfüredi KSE	26	17	2	7	806	733	+73	36	Qualification for European League group phase
4	FTC	26	17	0	9	826	776	+50	34	Qualification for European League first qualifying round
5	Grundfos Tatabánya KC	26	15	2	9	774	750	+24	32	
6	HE-DO B. Braun Gyöngyös	26	14	1	11	751	759	−8	29	
7	Sport36-Komló	26	11	3	12	753	771	−18	25	
8	Budakalász FKC	26	10	4	12	696	754	−58	24	
9	Csurgói KK	26	11	1	14	659	723	−64	23	
10	Fejér-B.Á.L. Veszprém	26	7	2	17	726	789	−63	16	Qualification for European League second qualifying round (Note: Fejér-B.Á.L. Veszprém qualified for the European League second qualifying round as the 2021–22 Magyar Kupa runners-up.)
11	Dabasi KC VSE	26	6	3	17	683	762	−79	15 (Note: Dabasi KC VSE is ahead of NEKA on head-to-head results: 52–20.)	
12	NEKA	26	7	1	18	694	777	−83	15	
13	SBS-Eger (R)	26	4	2	20	716	844	−128	10	Relegation to Nemzeti Bajnokság I/B
14	Kecskeméti TE-Piroska szörp (R)	26	4	0	22	675	824	−149	8	Relegation to Nemzeti Bajnokság I/B

Source: Hungarian Handball Federation (in Hungarian), Flashscore
Rules for classification: 1) Points; 2) Head-to-head points; 3) Goal difference; 4) Head-to-head goal difference; 5) Goals scored; 6) Matches won; 7) Draw (Note: Head-to-head record is used only after all the matches between the teams in question have been played)
(R) Relegated

=== Schedule and results ===
In the table below the home teams are listed on the left and the away teams along the top.

Home \ Away	BKSE	BUD	CSKK	DAB	EGER	FTC	GYKK	KTE	KBSK	NEKA	SZEG	TAT	VESZ	VKK
Balatonfüredi KSE	—	34–29	34–25	24–21	38–25	32–33	30–25	33–25	26–31	33–24	23–32	32–22	31–31	37–29
Budakalász FKC	20–20	—	26–23	31–28	28–27	30–29	37–27	30–29	26–25	30–28	23–38	31–35	26–41	25–25
Csurgói KK	19–29	25–25	—	22–19	33–34	35–36	26–24	25–22	23–19	26–23	20–33	22–27	21–33	30–28
Dabasi KC VSE	34–37	26–26	22–25	—	22–23	29–30	28–33	31–25	29–31	29–26	17–38	32–32	21–34	28–21
Eger-Eszterházy SzSE	21–36	23–28	24–27	20–24	—	26–37	32–36	32–25	30–30	29–29	24–32	28–32	28–36	27–35
Ferencvárosi TC	37–32	30–24	22–20	37–28	43–35	—	33–28	46–31	34–30	32–28	26–36	26–32	27–30	40–31
Gyöngyösi KK	27–28	31–26	32–31	25–27	33–28	26–23	—	30–25	25–37	30–25	30–28	30–22	28–36	28–27
Kecskeméti TE	29–35	29–22	29–31	25–24	28–29	24–31	25–29	—	24–37	27–22	31–34	27–26	20–36	19–28
Komlói BSK	33–35	33–28	29–30	29–29	33–32	33–31	27–27	28–24	—	27–26	28–38	26–32	28–35	25–24
NEKA	20–29	30–33	29–23	24–23	28–24	25–26	29–35	32–29	28–30	—	26–31	31–21	24–33	28–25
SC Pick Szeged	41–32	35–26	33–21	39–23	44–29	31–27	36–26	43–20	32–24	40–22	—	27–21	27–29	38–29
Tatabánya KC	38–27	23–19	32–24	32–26	32–27	33–28	39–35	42–34	30–25	34–23	28–39	—	23–34	27–27
Veszprém KC	36–29	34–28	34–21	44–29	43–32	39–30	26–22	42–24	39–24	49–32	26–26	37–28	—	37–33
Veszprém KKFT	26–30	26–19	25–31	29–34	32–27	28–32	28–29	26–25	34–31	29–32	23–42	33–31	25–37	—

Source: Results
Legend: Blue = home team win; Yellow = draw; Red = away team win.
For upcoming matches, an "a" indicates there is an article about the rivalry between the two participants.

== Finals ==
Team 1	Agg.	Team 2	1st leg	2nd leg
Telekom Veszprém	58–58 (a)	Pick Szeged	28–29	29–30

=== Game 1 ===
3 June 2022; 18:45	Pick Szeged	28–29	Telekom Veszprém	Pick Aréna, Szeged; Attendance: 8,000; Referees: Hargitai, Markó
3 June 2022; 18:45	three players 5	(16–15)	Yahia 7	Pick Aréna, Szeged; Attendance: 8,000; Referees: Hargitai, Markó
3 June 2022; 18:45	1× (yellow card) 3× (suspension)	Report	2× (yellow card) 4× (suspension)	Pick Aréna, Szeged; Attendance: 8,000; Referees: Hargitai, Markó

=== Game 2 ===
11 June 2021; 17:45	Telekom Veszprém	29–30	Pick Szeged	Veszprém Aréna, Veszprém; Attendance: 5,100; Referees: Bócz, Wiedemann
11 June 2021; 17:45	Mahé 7	(14–14)	Bombač, Rosta 6	Veszprém Aréna, Veszprém; Attendance: 5,100; Referees: Bócz, Wiedemann
11 June 2021; 17:45	2× (yellow card) 1× (suspension)	Report	2× (yellow card) 3× (suspension) 1× (red card)	Veszprém Aréna, Veszprém; Attendance: 5,100; Referees: Bócz, Wiedemann

58–58 on aggregate. Pick Szeged won the Finals on away goals.

2021–22 Nemzeti Bajnokság I
Champion

5th title

Alilović, Krivokapic, Mikler (goalkeepers), Bánhidi (c), Blonz, Bodó, Bombač, Frimmel, Gaber, Garciandia, Hegedűs, Henigman,
Ludmán, Mačkovšek, Martins, Radivojević, Radvánszki, Rea, Rosta, Šoštarić, Stepančić, Szilágyi, Tønnesen, Varga
Head coach: Juan Carlos Pastor, Assistant coach: Marko Krivokapić

== Season statistics ==
=== Top goalscorers ===
Rank	Player	Club	Goals	Shots	%
1	(Hungary) Bence Nagy	FTC	171	275	63
2	(Hungary) Balázs Szöllősi	Balatonfüred	158	247	64
3	(Hungary) Gábor Ancsin	Tatabánya	141	217	65
4	(Hungary) Benedek Éles	Veszprémi KKFT	140	232	61
5	(Serbia) Mitar Markez	Gyöngyös	137	199	69
6	(Croatia) (Hungary) Petar Topic	Balatonfüred	136	181	76
7	(Hungary) Gergő Fazekas	Veszprémi KKFT	117	156	75
8	(Serbia) Mladen Krsmančić	Csurgó	116	162	72
9	(Croatia) (Hungary) Srećko Jerković	Komló	115	184	63
10	(Hungary) Gergő Kovács	NEKA	113	177	64

== Hungarian clubs in European competitions ==
	Competition	Team	Progress	Result	Total W–D–L
EHF					
EHF	Champions; League	Pick Szeged	Play-offs	vs (Germany) SG Flensburg-Handewitt (L)	9–3–4
EHF	Champions; League	Pick Szeged	Group phase	3rd of 8 teams (8–3–3)	9–3–4
EHF	Champions; League	Telekom Veszprém	Bronze medal match	vs (Germany) THW Kiel (L) - p	10–3–7
EHF	Champions; League	Telekom Veszprém	Semifinal	vs (Poland) Łomża Vive Kielce (L)	10–3–7
EHF	Champions; League	Telekom Veszprém	Quarter-finals	vs (Denmark) Aalborg Håndbold (W)	10–3–7
EHF	Champions; League	Telekom Veszprém	Play-offs	vs (North Macedonia) RK Vardar (W)	10–3–7
EHF	Champions; League	Telekom Veszprém	Group phase	4th of 8 teams (8–1–5)	10–3–7
EHF	European League	Grundfos Tatabánya KC	Group phase	6th of 6 teams (3–0–7)	3–0–7
EHF	European League	Balatonfüredi KSE	Qualification Round 1	vs (Sweden) HK Malmö (L)	1–0–1
EHF	European League	Csurgói KK	Qualification Round 1	vs (Romania) HC Dobrogea Sud Constanța (L)	0–0–2

== See also ==
- 2021–22 Magyar Kupa
- 2021–22 Nemzeti Bajnokság I/B
- 2021–22 Nemzeti Bajnokság II
