= 2020–21 Nemzeti Bajnokság I (men's handball) =

K&H férfi liga
- Season: 2020–21
- Matches: 184

The 2020–21 Nemzeti Bajnokság I (known as the K&H férfi kézilabda liga for sponsorship reasons) was the 70th season of the Nemzeti Bajnokság I, Hungarian premier Handball league.

== Team information ==
As in the previous season, 14 teams played in the 2019–20 season. After the 2019–20 season, Ceglédi KKSE and Vecsés SE were relegated to the 2019–20 Nemzeti Bajnokság I/B. They were replaced by two clubs from the 2019–20 Nemzeti Bajnokság I/B; Orosházi FKSE and Váci KSE.

Location of teams in 2020–21 Nemzeti Bajnokság I

Team	Location	Arena	Capacity
Balatonfüredi KSE	Balatonfüred	Balatonfüredi Szabadidőközpont	712
Budakalász FKC	Budakalász	Budakalászi Sportcsarnok	400
Ceglédi KKSE	Cegléd	Gál József Sportcsarnok	1,046
Csurgói KK	Csurgó	Sótonyi László Sportcsarnok	1,200
Dabas KK	Dabas	OBO Aréna	1,920
DVTK-Eger	Eger	Kemény Ferenc Sportcsarnok	885
Ferencvárosi TC	Budapest, IX. ker	Elek Gyula Aréna	1,300
Gyöngyösi KK	Gyöngyös	Dr. Fejes András Sportcsarnok	1,500
Komlói BSK	Komló	Komlói Sportközpont	800
Orosházi FKSE	Orosháza	Eötvös Sportcsarnok	740
SC Pick Szeged	Szeged	Újszegedi Sportcsarnok	3,600
Tatabánya KC	Tatabánya	Földi Imre Sportcsarnok	1,000
Veszprém KC	Veszprém	Veszprém Aréna	5,096
Veszprém KKFT	Veszprém	Veszprém Aréna	5,096

=== Personnel and kits ===
Following is the list of clubs competing in 2020–21 Nemzeti Bajnokság I, with their president, head coach, kit manufacturer and shirt sponsor.

All teams are obligated to have the logo of the league sponsor OTP Bank as well as the Nemzeti Bajnokság I logo on the right sleeve of their shirt. Hungarian national sports betting brand tippmix sponsors all 14 teams of the first league since February 2019, their logo is therefore present on all team kits.

Team	President	Head coach	Kit manufacturer	Shirt sponsor(s)
Balatonfüred	László Csima	(Hungary) László György	2Rule	77 Elektronika, Takarékbank
Budakalász	Gábor Hajdu	(Hungary) István Csoknyai	2Rule	–
Cegléd	Róbert Kis	(Hungary) Károly Nagy	2Rule	Škoda Ceglédi Autóház
Csurgó	János Varga	(Serbia) Alem Toskić	hummel	PriMont, MenDan****, KLH Masters
Dabas	Csaba Prohászka	(Hungary) Győző Tomori	hummel	OBO Betterman, Volvo Galéria
DVTK-Eger	Róbert Szabó	(Hungary) Edmond Tóth	hummel	SBS
Ferencváros	Gábor Kubatov	(Hungary) Attila Horváth	Nike	my drone space, Lidl, Budapest
Gyöngyös	Zsolt Marczin	(Hungary) Csaba Konkoly	hummel	B. Braun, HE-DO
Komlói BSK	Szabolcs Szigeti	(Hungary) Bálint Klivinger	Zeus	Sport36 Komló
Orosháza	Tamás Vájer	(Montenegro) Ratko Đurković	paua	Linamar
Szeged	Nándor Szögi	(Spain) Juan Carlos Pastor	adidas	MOL, Pick, OTP Bank
Tatabánya	László Marosi	(Serbia) Vladan Matić	Jako	Grundfos
Telekom Veszprém	Gábor Kálomista	(Spain) David Davis	2Rule	Veszprém, Telekom, Euroaszfalt
Veszprémi KKFT	József Éles	(Hungary) Csaba Tombor	Erima	Veszprém, Völgység Agrár

== League table ==
=== Standings ===
Pos	Team	Pld	W	D	L	GF	GA	GD	Pts	Qualification or relegation
1	Telekom Veszprém	26	25	1	0	940	616	+324	51	Qualification to the Finals
2	MOL-Pick Szeged	26	23	0	3	893	651	+242	46	Qualification to the Finals
3	Grundfos Tatabánya KC	26	17	2	7	723	670	+53	36	Qualification to EHF European League third qualifying round
4	Balatonfüredi KSE	26	15	4	7	739	689	+50	34	Qualification to EHF European League third qualifying round
5	Csurgói KK	26	13	6	7	708	703	+5	32	Qualification to EHF European League second qualifying round
6	Ferencvárosi TC	26	14	1	11	736	714	+22	29	
7	Veszprém KKFT	26	12	1	13	699	727	−28	25	
8	SBS-Eger	26	10	3	13	702	790	−88	23	
9	Sport36-Komló	26	10	2	14	701	733	−32	22	
10	Budakalász Kézilabda Zrt.	26	9	3	14	700	729	−29	21	
11	HE-DO B. Braun Gyöngyös	26	9	1	16	691	719	−28	19	
12	Dabasi KC VSE	26	3	4	19	633	750	−117	10	
13	Ceglédi KKSE	26	4	2	20	612	767	−155	10	Relegation to Nemzeti Bajnokság I/B
14	Orosházi FKSE - Linamar	26	2	2	22	588	807	−219	6	Relegation to Nemzeti Bajnokság I/B

Updated to match(es) played on September 2021. Source: mksz.hu
Rules for classification: 1) Points; 2) Goal difference; 3) Head-to-head points; 4) Head-to-head goal difference; 5) Goals scored; 6) Matches won; 7) Draw (Note: Head-to-head record is used only after all the matches between the teams in question have been played)

=== Schedule and results ===
In the table below the home teams are listed on the left and the away teams along the top.

Home \ Away	BKSE	BUD	CEG	CSKK	DAB	EGER	FTC	GYKK	KBSK	ORO	SZEG	TAT	VESZ	VKK
Balatonfüredi KSE	—	28–26	–	–	26–24	39–25	–	27–23	31–26	42–20	26–35	27–27	–	29–23
Budakalász FKC	23–23	—	30–25	24–22	–	36–28	–	24–25	–	34–25	24–33	18–24	–	36–29
Ceglédi KKSE	26–35	–	—	20–30	23–21	–	26–24	–	25–27	22–22	22–38	–	20–48	25–25
Csurgói KK	27–27	28–23	28–19	—	25–25	–	–	–	29–24	29–26	28–32	–	33–33	39–33
Dabas KK	–	17–27	31–24	26–30	—	21–29	24–26	32–26	–	27–22	–	21–27	–	27–29
DVTK-Eger	–	–	30–26	27–24	26–26	—	28–30	25–26	33–26	–	21–41	36–33	21–40	–
Ferencvárosi TC	28–32	30–27	31–19	28–26	–	33–34	—	–	23–26	36–18	–	–	–	29–28
Gyöngyösi KK	28–24	34–31	30–24	26–27	–	30–30	27–31	—	30–26	28–23	–	23–29	25–35	24–27
Komlói BSK	26–30	28–28	–	–	28–19	32–27	–	29–26	—	33–25	29–37	23–25	–	30–28
Orosházi FKSE	–	–	–	–	19–19	21–24	–	24–29	24–23	—	22–39	–	23–36	23–31
SC Pick Szeged	–	34–22	42–21	30–33	–	47–27	–	–	–	37–21	—	–	24–36	28–25
Tatabánya KC	28–24	–	27–22	33–16	31–28	–	24–27	25–24	30–24	35–21	–	—	–	–
Telekom Veszprém	38–11	35–24	34–19	40–21	38–20	44–28	29–25	26–25	40–31	37–20	27–23	–	—	36–20
Veszprém KKFT	–	26–21	–	27–19	–	26–27	33–24	–	–	–	23–25	–	21–37	—

Updated to match(es) played on 11 April 2021. Source: Results
Legend: Blue = home team win; Yellow = draw; Red = away team win.
For upcoming matches, an "a" indicates there is an article about the rivalry between the two participants.

== Finals ==
Team 1	Agg.	Team 2	Game 1	Game 2
Telekom Veszprém (1)	64–68	MOL-Pick Szeged (2)	28–31	36–37

Game 1

2 June 2021; 19:00 (CEST)	MOL-Pick Szeged	31 – 28	Telekom Veszprém	Városi Sportcsarnok, Szeged; Attendance: 2,100; Referees: Horváth, Marton
2 June 2021; 19:00 (CEST)	Bodó 5	(14–14)	Nenadić 7, Nilsson 7	Városi Sportcsarnok, Szeged; Attendance: 2,100; Referees: Horváth, Marton
2 June 2021; 19:00 (CEST)	2× (yellow card) 4× (suspension)	Report	2× (yellow card) 3× (suspension) 1× (red card)	Városi Sportcsarnok, Szeged; Attendance: 2,100; Referees: Horváth, Marton

Game 2

5 June 2021; 18:30 (CEST)	Telekom Veszprém	36 – 37	MOL-Pick Szeged	Veszprém Aréna, Veszprém; Attendance: 4,500; Referees: Bíró, Kiss
5 June 2021; 18:30 (CEST)	Mahé 9	(14–15)	Radivojević 6	Veszprém Aréna, Veszprém; Attendance: 4,500; Referees: Bíró, Kiss
5 June 2021; 18:30 (CEST)	1× (yellow card) 2× (suspension)	Report	1× (yellow card) 1× (suspension) 1× (red card)	Veszprém Aréna, Veszprém; Attendance: 4,500; Referees: Bíró, Kiss

MOL-Pick Szeged won the Finals, 68–64 on aggregate.

2020–21 Nemzeti Bajnokság I
Champion

4th title

Alilović, Krivokapic, Mikler, Nagy (goalkeepers), Bajus, Bánhidi, Bodó, Bombač, Cañellas, Gaber, Henigman,
Källman (c), Kašpárek, Kecskés, Mačkovšek, Radivojević, Rea, Rosta, Šoštarić, Stepančić, Straňovský, Szilágyi, Tóth, Zhitnikov
Head coach: Juan Carlos Pastor, Assistant coach: Marko Krivokapić

== Season statistics ==
=== Top goalscorers ===
Rank	Player	Team	Goals	Matches
1	(Montenegro) Ivan Perišić	Budakalász	161	26
2	(Hungary) András Koncz	Budakalász	137	26
3	(Hungary) Áron Lezák	SBS-Eger	134	26
4	(Hungary) Balázs Szöllősi	Balatonfüred	132	24
5	(Hungary) Gergő Fazekas	Veszprémi KKFT	129	24
6	(Serbia) Bogdan Radivojević	Szeged	126	23
7	(Serbia) Mladen Krsmančić	Csurgói KK	125	23
8	(Hungary) Bence Nagy	FTC	117	25
9	(Hungary) Benedek Éles	Veszprémi KKFT	115	19
10	(Hungary) (Croatia) Petar Topic	Balatonfüred	112	23

=== Number of teams by counties ===
Pos.	County (megye)	No. of teams	Teams
1	Pest	3	Budakalász FKC, Ceglédi KKSE and Dabas KK
1	Veszprém	3	Balatonfüredi KSE, Telekom Veszprém and Veszprém KKFT Felsőörs
3	Heves	2	SBS Eger and Gyöngyösi KK
3	Baranya	1	Komlói BSK
3	Békés	1	Orosházi FKSE
3	Budapest (capital)	1	Ferencvárosi TC
3	Csongrád	1	MOL-Pick Szeged
3	Komárom-Esztergom	1	Tatabánya KC
3	Somogy	1	Csurgói KK

== See also ==
- 2020–21 Magyar Kupa
- 2020–21 Nemzeti Bajnokság I/B
- 2020–21 Nemzeti Bajnokság II
