= 2024–25 Magyar Kupa (men's handball) =

Tournament details
- Country: Hungary
- Dates: 16 August 2024 – 13 April 2025

Final positions
- Champions: OTP Bank-Pick Szeged; 8th title
- Runners-up: ONE Veszprém
- Third place: Tatabánya KC
- Fourth place: HE-DO B. Braun Gyöngyös

The 2024–25 Magyar Kupa (English: Hungarian Cup) is the 67th season of Hungary's annual knock-out cup handball competition.

OTP Bank-Pick Szeged won their eighth title.

== Schedule ==
Times up to 26 October 2024 and from 30 March 2025 are CEST (UTC+2). Times from 27 October 2024 to 29 March 2025 are CET (UTC+1).

The rounds of the 2024–25 competition are scheduled as follows:

Round	Draw date	Matches	Fixtures	Clubs	New entries	Leagues entering
Round I	July 2024	16 August–18 September 2024	8	16 → 8	16	Nemzeti Bajnokság I/B, Nemzeti Bajnokság II and, Megyei Bajnokság I
Round II	25 September 2024	1–16 October 2024	8	16 → 8	8	Nemzeti Bajnokság I/B
Round III	21 October 2024	7–13 November 2024	8	16 → 8	8	Nemzeti Bajnokság I, places 7–14
Round IV	11 November 2024	22 January–5 February 2025	6	12 → 6	4	Nemzeti Bajnokság I, places 3–6
Quarter-finals	10 February 2025	19–23 March 2024	4	8 → 4	2	Nemzeti Bajnokság I, places 1–2
Final four	24 March 2025	12–13 April 2024	4	4 → 1	none	none

== Final four ==
The final four will be held on 12–13 April 2024 at the Tatabányai Multifunkcionális Sportcsarnok in Tatabánya.

Semi-finals
12 April, 15:45
ONE Veszprém	40
MOL Tatabánya	26
12 April, 18:30
HE-DO B. Braun Gyöngyös	29
OTP Bank-Pick Szeged	34

Final
13 April, 19:30
ONE Veszprém	30
OTP Bank-Pick Szeged	31
Bronze medal match
13 April, 16:45
MOL Tatabánya	31
HE-DO B. Braun Gyöngyös	29

=== Awards ===
- Most valuable player: (Sweden) Tobias Thulin

==== Final standings ====
	Team
	OTP Bank-Pick Szeged; 8th title
Silver medal	ONE Veszprém
Bronze medal	MOL Tatabánya
4th	HE-DO B. Braun Gyöngyös

=== Semi-finals ===
12 April 2025; 15:45	Telekom Veszprém	40–26	MOL Tatabánya	Tatabányai Multifunkcionális Sportcsarnok, Tatabánya; Attendance: 3,226; Referees: Hargitai, Markó
12 April 2025; 15:45	Pechmalbec, Fabregas 6	(17–12)	three players 5	Tatabányai Multifunkcionális Sportcsarnok, Tatabánya; Attendance: 3,226; Referees: Hargitai, Markó
12 April 2025; 15:45	2× (yellow card) 3× (suspension)	Report	1× (yellow card) 2× (suspension)	Tatabányai Multifunkcionális Sportcsarnok, Tatabánya; Attendance: 3,226; Referees: Hargitai, Markó

12 April 2025; 18:30	HE-DO B. Braun Gyöngyös	29–34	OTP Bank-Pick Szeged	Tatabányai Multifunkcionális Sportcsarnok, Tatabánya; Attendance: 3,056; Referees: Sándor, Szabó
12 April 2025; 18:30	Ubornyák, Lakosy 6	(16–18)	Frimmel 11	Tatabányai Multifunkcionális Sportcsarnok, Tatabánya; Attendance: 3,056; Referees: Sándor, Szabó
12 April 2025; 18:30	5× (suspension) 1× (red card)	Report	1× (yellow card) 6× (suspension)	Tatabányai Multifunkcionális Sportcsarnok, Tatabánya; Attendance: 3,056; Referees: Sándor, Szabó

=== Bronze medal match ===
13 April 2025; 16:45	MOL Tatabánya	31–29	HE-DO B. Braun Gyöngyös	Tatabányai Multifunkcionális Sportcsarnok, Tatabánya; Attendance: 4,126; Referees: Bócz, Wiedemann
13 April 2025; 16:45	Ntanzi 10	(15–17)	Potisk 7	Tatabányai Multifunkcionális Sportcsarnok, Tatabánya; Attendance: 4,126; Referees: Bócz, Wiedemann
13 April 2025; 16:45	6× (suspension)	Report	5× (suspension) 1× (red card)	Tatabányai Multifunkcionális Sportcsarnok, Tatabánya; Attendance: 4,126; Referees: Bócz, Wiedemann

=== Final ===
13 April 2025; 19:30	ONE Veszprém	30–31	OTP Bank-Pick Szeged	Tatabányai Multifunkcionális Sportcsarnok, Tatabánya; Attendance: 4,949; Referees: Andorka, Hucker
13 April 2025; 19:30	Elísson 11	(12–15)	Šoštarić 7	Tatabányai Multifunkcionális Sportcsarnok, Tatabánya; Attendance: 4,949; Referees: Andorka, Hucker
13 April 2025; 19:30	4× (suspension) 1× (red card)	Report	5× (suspension) 1× (red card)	Tatabányai Multifunkcionális Sportcsarnok, Tatabánya; Attendance: 4,949; Referees: Andorka, Hucker

2024–25 Magyar Kupa
Winner

OTP Bank-Pick Szeged
8th title

Bence Bánhidi (c), Richárd Bodó, Sebastian Frimmel, Imanol Garciandia, Marin Jelinić, Gleb Kalarash, Lazar Kukić, Borut Mačkovšek, Roland Mikler, Martin Nagy, Barnabás Rea, Magnus Abelvik Rød, Janus Daði Smárason, Mario Šoštarić, Benjámin Szilágyi, Zsombor Szepesi, Tobias Thulin, Jérémy Toto
Head coach: Michael Apelgren

== See also ==
- 2024–25 Nemzeti Bajnokság I
- 2024–25 Nemzeti Bajnokság I/B
- 2024–25 Nemzeti Bajnokság II
