= Péter Lukács (handballer) =

Hungarian handball player (born 2002)

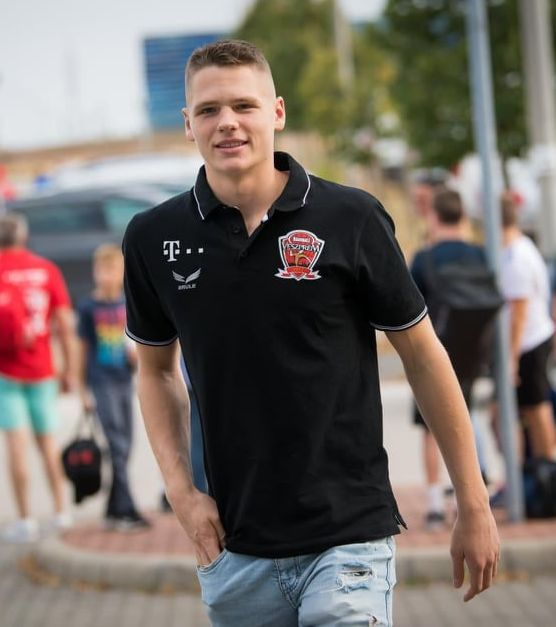
- Lukács in 2021

Personal information
- Nationality: Hungarian
- Born: 30 July 2002 (age 24) Budapest, Hungary
- Height: 1.90 m (6 ft 3 in)

Sport
- Sport: Handball
- Position: Central back
- Current club: Elverum Håndball

Youth career
- Years: Team
- 2009–2015: PLER KC
- 2015–2018: Ferencvárosi TC

Senior clubs
- Years: Team
- 2018–2021: (Hungary) Ferencvárosi TC
- 2020–2021: → (Hungary) BFKA-Veszprém (loan)
- 2021–2026: (Hungary) Telekom Veszprém
- 2023–2026: → (Norway) Elverum Håndball (loan)
- 2026: (Norway) Elverum Håndball
- 2026–: (Hungary) OTP Bank – Pick Szeged
National team
Years	Team	Apps	(Gls)
2024–	Hungary	14	(4)
Medal record
Junior World Championship
Silver medal – second place	2023 Germany/Greece

Péter Lukács (born 30 July 2002) is a Hungarian handball player for Elverum Håndball and the Hungary national team.

== Career ==
=== Club ===
Péter started his career at PLER KC. He was the team captain of PLER KC's age-group teams. He joined the Ferencvárosi TC in 2015, and made his debut in the Nemzeti Bajnokság I in the 2018/2019 season. He scored 13 goals in 24 games.

In the 2020–2021 season, he was transferred on loan to the Telekom Veszprém youth team (BFKA-Veszprém), of which he also became the captain. Here he became a silver medalist and top scorer in the Nemzeti Bajnokság I/B championship (21 matches / 182 goals). This season, he also played in a couple of matches in Telekom Veszprém's adult team in Nemzeti Bajnokság I (13 matches, 3 goals). At the beginning of the 2021/2022 season, Telekom Veszprém acquired him for good and they count on him for the senior team. This season, he also made his debut in the EHF Champions League, participated in the BL Final 4 in Cologne, where he also scored a goal in the bronze medal match. At the end of the 2022/2023 season, he became champion and cup winner with Telekom Veszprém, and then it was announced that he would be loaned to the Norwegian team Elverum Håndball for two years. He scored 131 goals in 74 first team matches for Telekom Veszprém. In January 2025, it was announced that he had extended his contract with Elverum Håndball until 2027, in 2026 he was still on loan from Telekom Veszprém, but from 2026 he will permanently join Elverum Håndball. He will not complete his contract with Elverum Håndball until 2027, because from the summer of 2026 he will become a player of the Hungarian top team, OTP Bank – Pick Szeged.

=== National team ===
He was 9th with the Hungarian team at the 2021 Youth European Championship. As a member of the junior national team, he participated in the 2022 Junior European Championship where the Hungarian team became the 5th. He participated in the 2023 Junior World Championship, where Hungary won the silver medal. He was included in the large squad of the 2024 European Men's Handball Championship, but in the end he will not become a member of the narrow squad. On November 10, 2024, he made his debut in the senior national team in Vantaa at the Finland-Hungary European Championship qualifier, where the Hungarians won 23–32, Péter scored 2 goals. He was included in the large squad of the 2025 World Men's Handball Championship, but in the end he will not become a member of the narrow squad. He also participated in the 2026 European Men's Handball Championship as a member of the Hungary men's national handball team. (10th place, 7 games / 0 goals).

== Honours ==
=== National team ===
- Junior World Championship:
  - Silver: 2023

=== Club ===
BFKA-Veszprém

- Nemzeti Bajnokság I/B
  - Silver: 2021

Telekom Veszprém

- Nemzeti Bajnokság I:
  - Gold: 2023
  - Silver: 2021, 2022
- Magyar Kupa:
  - Gold: 2022, 2023
- SEHA League
  - Gold: 2021, 2022

Elverum HB

- Norwegian Championship:
  - Silver: 2024, 2025
- Norwegian Cup:
  - Silver: 2024, 2025

OTP Bank – Pick Szeged

- Hungarian Supercup
  - Silver: 2026

=== Individual ===
- Nemzeti Bajnokság I/B Top Scorer: 2021 (21 matches / 182 goals)
- Hungarian Adolescent Handballer of the Year: 2018
