= Dmytro Horiha =

Ukrainian handball player

Personal information
- Nationality: Macedonian (North Macedonia)
- Born: 8 October 1997 (age 29) Brovary, Ukraine
- Height: 1.96 m (6 ft 5 in)

Sport
- Sport: Handball
- Position: Left back
- Current club: RK Vardar 1961
- Number: 24

Senior clubs
- Years: Team
- 2016–2018: Motor-Politehnika
- 2018–2023: HC Motor Zaporizhzhia
- 2019–2020: → Pogoń Szczecin
- 2022: → BM Nava
- 2023: Pays d'Aix UC
- 2024: Al Arabi
- 2024–2026: RK Vardar 1961
- 2026–: OTP Bank-Pick Szeged
National team
Years	Team	Apps	(Gls)
–	Ukraine	24	(60)
2026-	Macedonia	0	(0)

Dmytro Horiha (Ukrainian: Дмитро Горіга, born 8 October 1997) is a Macedonian-Ukrainian handball player for RK Vardar 1961.

He represented Ukraine at the 2020 European Men's Handball Championship.

== Honours ==
- Macedonian Handball Super League (North Macedonia)

Winner: 2026

- Macedonian Handball Cup (North Macedonia)

Winner: 2025, 2026
