= Gleb Kalarash =

Russian handball player

Personal information
- Nationality: Russian
- Born: 29 November 1990 (age 35) Moscow, Russia
- Height: 2.05 m (6 ft 9 in)

Sport
- Sport: Handball
- Position: Pivot
- Current club: OTP Bank-Pick Szeged
- Number: 30

Senior clubs
- Years: Team
- 2013–2015: Saint Petersburg HC
- 2015–2017: HC Motor Zaporizhzhia
- 2017–2018: SC Magdeburg
- 2018–2021: RK Vardar 1961
- 09/2021–10/2021: HBW Balingen-Weilstetten
- 10/2021–2023: MT Melsungen
- 2023–2026: OTP Bank-Pick Szeged
- 2026–: RK Zagreb
National team
Years	Team	Apps	(Gls)
–	Russia	68	(117)

Gleb Kalarash (Russian: Глеб Владиславович Калараш; born 29 November 1990) is a Russian handball player for OTP Bank-Pick Szeged and the Russian national team.

== Achievements ==
=== European competitions ===
RK Vardar:

- EHF Champions League winner: 2018/19
- SEHA League winner: 2018/19
- SEHA League silver: 2019/20

=== Domestic competitions ===
SC Pick Szeged:

- Hungarian Handball Cup winner: 2024/2025

RK Vardar:

- Macedonian Handball Super League winner: 2018/19, 2020/21
- Macedonian Handball Cup winner: 2020/21

HK Motor:

- Ukrainian Handball League winner: 2015/16, 2016/17
- Ukrainian Supercup winner: 2015/16, 2016/17
- Ukrainian Handball Cup winner: 2015/16, 2016/17

HC Saint Petersburg

- Russian Handball League silver: 2013/14
- Russian Handball League bronze: 2014/15
