= Stefán Rafn Sigurmannsson =

Icelandic handball player (born 1990)

Personal information
- Nationality: Icelandic
- Born: 19 May 1990 (age 36) Hafnarfjörður, Iceland
- Height: 1.96 m (6 ft 5 in)

Sport
- Sport: Handball
- Position: Left wing
- Current club: Haukar Handball

Youth career
- Years: Team
- –2008: Haukar

Senior clubs
- Years: Team
- 2008–2012: Haukar
- 2012–2016: Rhein-Neckar Löwen
- 2016–2017: Aalborg Håndbold
- 2017–2021: SC Pick Szeged
- 2021–2024: Haukar
National team
| Years | Team | Apps | (Gls) |
| 2012–2020 | Iceland | 72 | (96) |

Stefán Rafn Sigurmannsson (born 19 May 1990) is an Icelandic former professional handball player. He played for Rhein-neckar löwen, Ålborg handball, Pick Szeged, Haukar and the Icelandic national team.

== Club career ==
With Rhein-Neckar Löwen, Stefán Rafn won the German Bundesliga title in 2016, the first league championship in the club's history. Earlier, in 2013, he was part of the club's EHF Cup–winning team.

In 2016 he joined Aalborg Håndbold, he won the Danish Championship with the club.

At Pick Szeged, Stefán Rafn won the Hungarian Championship in 2018, ending the club's 11-year wait for a league title. In 2019, he also won the Hungarian Cup with the team.

In Iceland, Stefán Rafn played exclusively for his boyhood club Haukar, where he won the Icelandic Championship three times.

== International career ==
Stefán Rafn earned 72 caps for the Icelandic national team, scoring 96 goals. He represented Iceland at five major international tournaments: the European Championships in 2014 and 2016, and the World Championships in 2013, 2015 and 2019.

In the later years of his career, recurring injuries significantly affected his playing time.

== Honours and awards ==
=== MOL-Pick Szeged ===
- K&H Férfi Kézilabda Liga: 2017–18
- Magyar Kézilabdakupa: 2018–19

• Danish handball league champion 2016-2017 (Aalborg)

• German handball league champion 2013-2014 (Rhein-neckar loewen)

• Icelandic handball league champion 2011-2012 (Haukar)
