= Dragan Đukić (handballer) =

Serbian handball coach (born 1962)

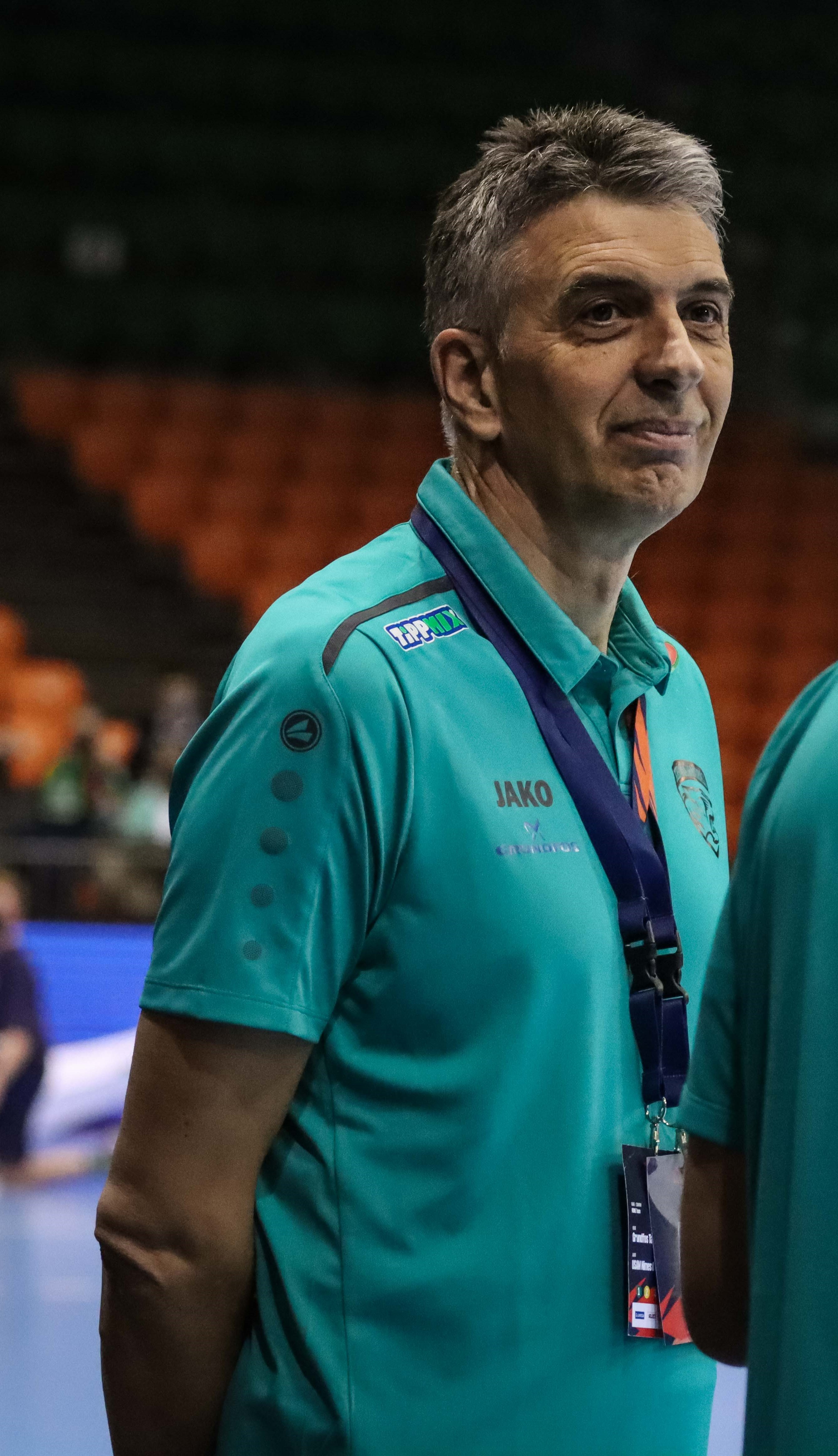
- Dragan Đukić, current head coach of the Chinese National team

Personal information
- Nationality: Serbian
- Born: 9 August 1962 (age 64) Aranđelovac, FPR Yugoslavia

Sport
- Sport: Handball
- Current club: China’s national team

Teams managed
- Years: Team
- 1986–1993: Zupa, Serbia
- 1993–1994: Metaloplastika
- 1994–1995: Zupa, Serbia
- 1995–1997: Kolubara
- 1997–1998: Napredak, Serbia
- 1998–1999: Sever, Serbia
- 1999–2000: Crvena zvezda
- 2000–2000: Jordan
- 2000–2003: Pick Szeged
- 2003–2005: Vardar
- 2003–2004: North Macedonia
- 2005–2006: Madeira
- 2006–2008: Switzerland
- 2009–2012: Great Britain
- 2009–2010: Pick Szeged
- 2012–2015: Israel
- 2016–2017: Maccabi Tel Aviv
- 2017–2018: HC Odorheiu Secuiesc
- 2016–2018: Montenegro
- 2018–2019: CSM București
- 2019–2020: Georgia (Sport Director)
- 2021–2022: Tatabánya KC
- 2022–2023: Israel
- 2023-2024: AEK H.C.
- 2024-2025: Tatabánya KC
- 2025: China

Dragan Đukić (born 9 August 1962) is a Serbian handball coach. He is currently the Head Coach of the Chinese Men’s National Team.

With the National Team of Great Britain took part at London 2012 Olympic Games and with Montenegro participated at the European Championship in Croatia 2018.

== Handball academy, book and seminars ==
Conceptual initiator, founder, and organizer of the project "Handball 4All," a unique program of individual handball education for young players and coaches from all over the world, running since 2011 in Serbia.

In 2020, he published a highly successful handball book on the principles of the 3:2:1 defense, entitled "3:2:1 – Back to Basics".

He has held seminars and lectures in Serbia, Portugal, Hungary, Switzerland, Greece, Great Britain, North Macedonia, Turkey, Montenegro, Tunisia, Japan, and Bulgaria on a variety of handball-related topics. As a lecturer, he has participated in the Master Coach courses of the handball federations of Poland, Croatia, Greece, Israel, Denmark, Slovakia, Russia, and Italy.

In April 2022, he became an official Lecturer of the European Handball Federation (EHF Expert), and in December 2023, he became an official Lecturer of the International Handball Federation (IHF CCM Lecturer).

== Education ==
He graduated from the Faculty of Physical Education in Novi Sad (Serbia) and completed a master’s degree at the Faculty of Sport in Belgrade (Serbia).

He has been a certified Master Coach of the European Handball Federation since 2014, which is the highest level of education for handball coaches.

In 2018, he completed a master’s program at the EHF/University of Las Palmas (Spain) and was part of the first generation of Academic EHF Master Coaches.

== Coaching career ==
In the period from 1987 to 2001 he was hired as a coach of various junior selections of Yugoslavia, Serbia and Montenegro and Serbia. Through his work, he played a role in the becoming of several young players everywhere he worked: Ivan Lapčević ("Zupa"), Danijel Anđelković ("Kolubara"), Nikola Eklemović and Daniel Buday (Pick Szeged), Carlos Carneiro ("Madeira SAD"), Andy Schmid (Swiss National Team) etc.

In addition, during the same period, he coached several clubs in Serbia:

- "Zupa" Aleksandrovac 1986-1993 and 1994/95
- RK Metaloplastika 1993/94
- RK Kolubara 1995-1997
- ZORK "Napredak" Krusevac 1997/98
- "Sever Kozateks" Subotica 1998/99
- RK Crvena zvezda 1999/00

In December 2000, he became coach of the Hungarian club Pick Szeged, where he remained until June 2003. He then moved to Macedonia and worked as coach of Vardar Vatrostalna Skopje (2003 to 2005), and as head coach of the Macedonian national team (2003 to 2004). In the 2005 to 2006 season, he took over the Portuguese club Madeira SAD from Funchal.

From 2006 to 2008, he was head coach of Switzerland.

In April 2009, Đukić succeeded Carsten Albrektsen as head coach of the Great Britain national team, with the goal of forming a team for the 2012 Olympic handball tournament in London. During the 2009 to 2010 season, he also led Pick Szeged at the same time.

After the Olympic Games, Đukić left Great Britain and in September 2012 became head coach of the Israeli national team, a position he held until August 2015.

In the 2016 to 2017 season, he led Maccabi Tel Aviv. With the club, he won the national cup and reached the group phase of the EHF Cup, the only Israeli team to have achieved this so far.

In December 2016, he became head coach of Montenegro and remained in the role until July 2018. After successfully completing qualification, Montenegro participated in the 2018 European Championship in Zagreb.

From October 2018 to July 2019, he coached the women’s team of CSM Bucharest, winning the national cup and reaching the quarter-finals of the Champions League.

From 2019 to 2020, he held the position of sports director of all selections of the Handball Federation of Georgia.

From 2021 to 2022, he coached Grundfos Tatabanya KC in Hungary, with whom he participated in the European Handball League.

In the 2022 to 2023 season, he again coached the Israeli national team and helped develop a new generation of players.

In the first part of the 2023 to 2024 season, he coached Greek champions AEK Athens and participated in the group phase of the EHF European League. In the second part of the same season, he returned to the bench of Tatabánya and finished third in the Hungarian league.

Since November 2025, he has been the head coach of the Chinese national team.

== Achievements and recognitions ==
- Champion and Cup Winner of North Macedonia with Vardar Vatrostalna
- Cup Winner of Israel with Maccabi Tel Aviv
- Romanian Cup Winner with CSM Bucharest
- MEHL League winner with Pick Szeged (Hungary)
- 1/2 of EHF CWC with “Vardar Vatrostalna” (North Macedonia)
- 1/4 of Ch League with CSM Bucharest (Romania)

He has been awarded different recognitions for his individual work as a coach:

- The best youth coach by the Handball federation of the Republic of Yugoslavia in 1993;
- Coach of the year in Aleksandrovac in 1993 and Lazarevac in 1995;
- Coach of the century of the municipality of Aleksandrovac in 2000;
- Coach of the year in Hungary in 2002;

With "Zupa" in the 1994/95 season, he took place in the First Federal League of the Federal Republic of Yugoslavia, the highest level of competition, and was the champion of Serbia and Yugoslavia in the 1992/93 season with the younger selections of the same club.

== Playing career ==
During his playing career, he played for Župa Aleksandrovac, Student Kragujevac, and Goč Vrnjačka Banja, all clubs from Serbia. Very early, in 1986, he decided to dedicate himself to a coaching career and initially worked as a coach while still playing for Župa.
