= Tobias Thulin =

Swedish handball player (born 1995)

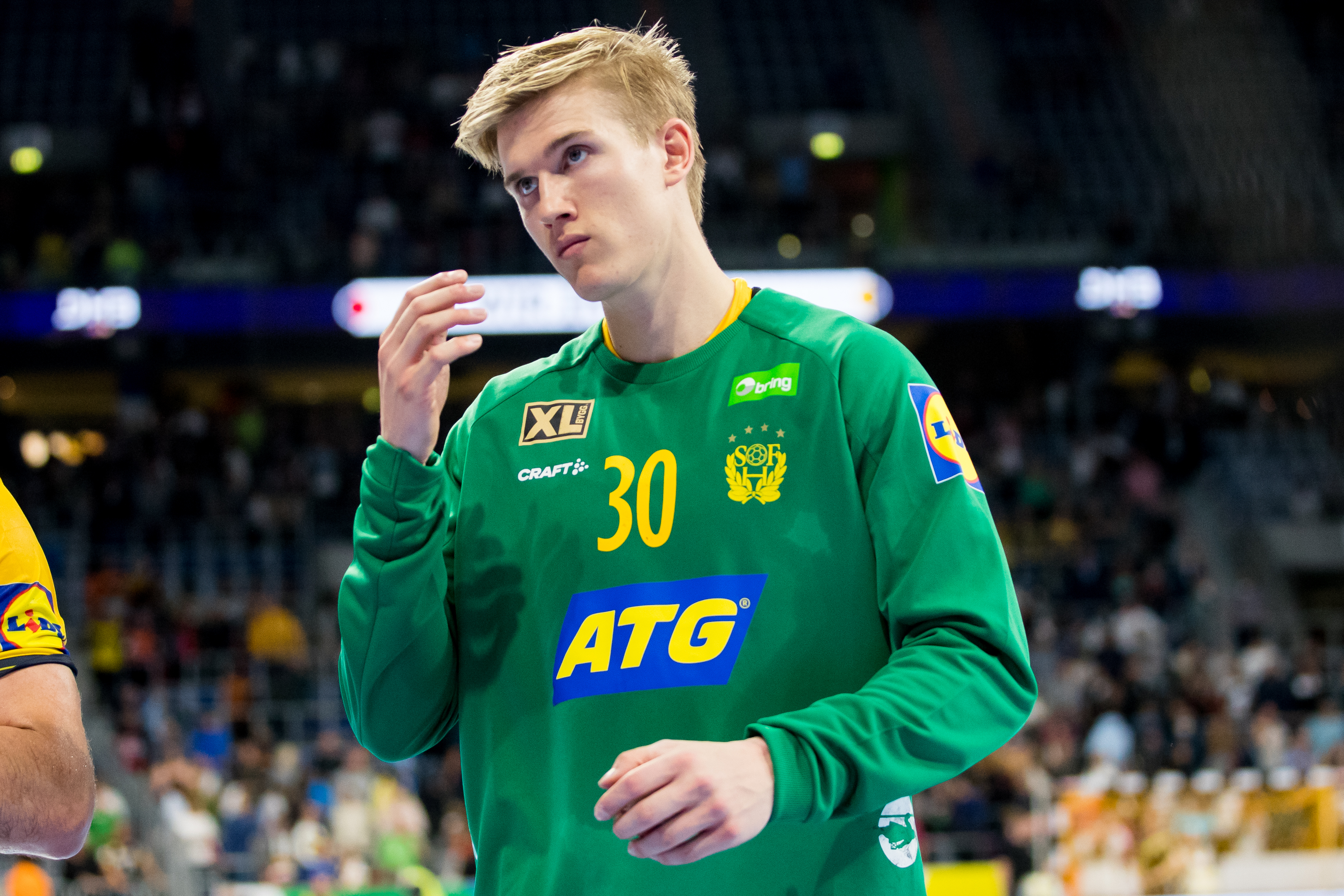

Personal information
- Nationality: Swedish
- Born: 5 July 1995 (age 31) Gothenburg, Sweden
- Height: 1.98 m (6 ft 6 in)

Sport
- Sport: Handball
- Position: Goalkeeper
- Current club: OTP Bank-Pick Szeged
- Number: 16

Youth career
- Years: Team
- –2011: Önnereds HK
- 2011–2012: Redbergslids IK

Senior clubs
- Years: Team
- 2012–2019: Redbergslids IK
- 2019–2021: SC Magdeburg
- 2021–2022: TVB 1898 Stuttgart
- 2022–2024: GOG Håndbold
- 2024–: OTP Bank-Pick Szeged
National team
Years	Team	Apps	(Gls)
2017–	Sweden	67	(0)
Medal record
European Championship
Gold medal – first place	2022 Hungary/Slovakia
Bronze medal – third place	2024 Germany
- Updated on 5 January 2025

Tobias Thulin (born 5 July 1995) is a Swedish handball player who plays for OTP Bank-Pick Szeged and the Swedish national team.

== Career ==
He began playing handball at Önnereds HK before switching to the youth team of Redbergslids IK in 2011, where he made is senior debut. In 2017 he won the 'årets komet' award for best Swedish youth player after being the best goalkeeper in the Swedish league, measured both in number of saves and save percentage.

In 2018 he transferred to German Bundesliga team SC Magdeburg. Here he won the EHF European League in 2021. Same year he joined league rivals TVB 1898 Stuttgart.

Just a year later he joined Danish top club GOG Håndbold. Here he won both the Danish Cup and the Danish championship in his first season.

In 2024 he joined Hungarian side OTP Bank-Pick Szeged. Here he won the 2025 Magyar Kupa.

== National team ==
He debuted for the Swedish national team in 2017 in a match against Poland.

At the 2022 European Championship he won gold medals.

At the 2023 World Championship he had the highest save percentage at the tournament with 30%. Sweden finished 4th.

At the 2024 European Championship he won bronze medals with Sweden. He played all 9 games.

At the 2025 World Championship he represented Sweden again but they would finish at a disappointing 14th place.

== Achievements ==
- (gold) EHF European League 2021 with SC Magdeburg
- (gold) Danish League 2023 with GOG Håndbold
- (gold) Danish Cup 2022 with GOG Håndbold
- (gold) Magyar Kupa 2025 with Pick Szeged
