= SC Pick Szeged =

Hungarian handball club

OTP Bank – Pick Szeged
- Full name: Sport Club Pick Szeged
- Short name: Szeged
- Founded: 1961; 65 years ago
- Arena: Pick Aréna
- Capacity: 8,143
- President: Edward Papp
- Head coach: Michael Apelgren
- Captain: Bence Bánhidi
- League: K&H férfi kézilabda liga
- 2024–25: 2nd of 14
- Club colours
Home	Away

SC Pick Szeged is a Hungarian professional handball club from Szeged, that plays in the K&H férfi kézilabda liga and the EHF Champions League.

The current name of the club is OTP Bank – Pick Szeged due to sponsorship reasons.

Location of OTP Bank – Pick Szeged

== Crest, colours, supporters ==
=== Naming history ===
Name	Period
Szegedi Előre	−1965
Szegedi Építők	1966
Szegedi Előre	1967–1969
Szegedi Volán SC	1970–1985
Tisza Volán SC	1986–1993
Pick Szeged	1993–2014
MOL-Pick Szeged	2014–2021
Pick Szeged	2021–2022
OTP Bank – Pick Szeged	2022–present

=== Kit manufacturers and shirt sponsor ===
The following table shows in detail SC Pick Szeged kit manufacturers and shirt sponsors by year:

Kit manufacturers

Period	Kit manufacturer
– 2010	(Germany) Adidas
2010–2011	(Germany) Erima
2011–2024	(Germany) Adidas
2024–present	(Denmark) Hummel

Shirt sponsor

Period	Sponsor
– 2010	Szeviép Zrt. / Pick / Budapest Bank / Hyundai
2010–2011	Pick / Sole-Mizo Zrt. / OTP Bank / MMBF Zrt.
2011–2012	Pick / Sole-Mizo Zrt. / OTP Bank / MMBF Zrt. / Toyota
2012–2016	Pick / MOL / OTP Bank / MMBF Zrt. / Toyota
2016–2017	Pick / MOL / OTP Bank / Toyota / tippmixPro
2017–2021	Pick / MOL / OTP Bank / Toyota / tippmix
2021–present	Pick / OTP Bank / Toyota / tippmixPro

=== Kits ===
HOME
2010–11	2011–13	2013–15	2017–18	2018–19

AWAY
2006–07	2010–11	2011–13	2023–24

THIRD
2009–10	2010–11	2011–13	2014–16	2021–22

== Sports Hall information ==
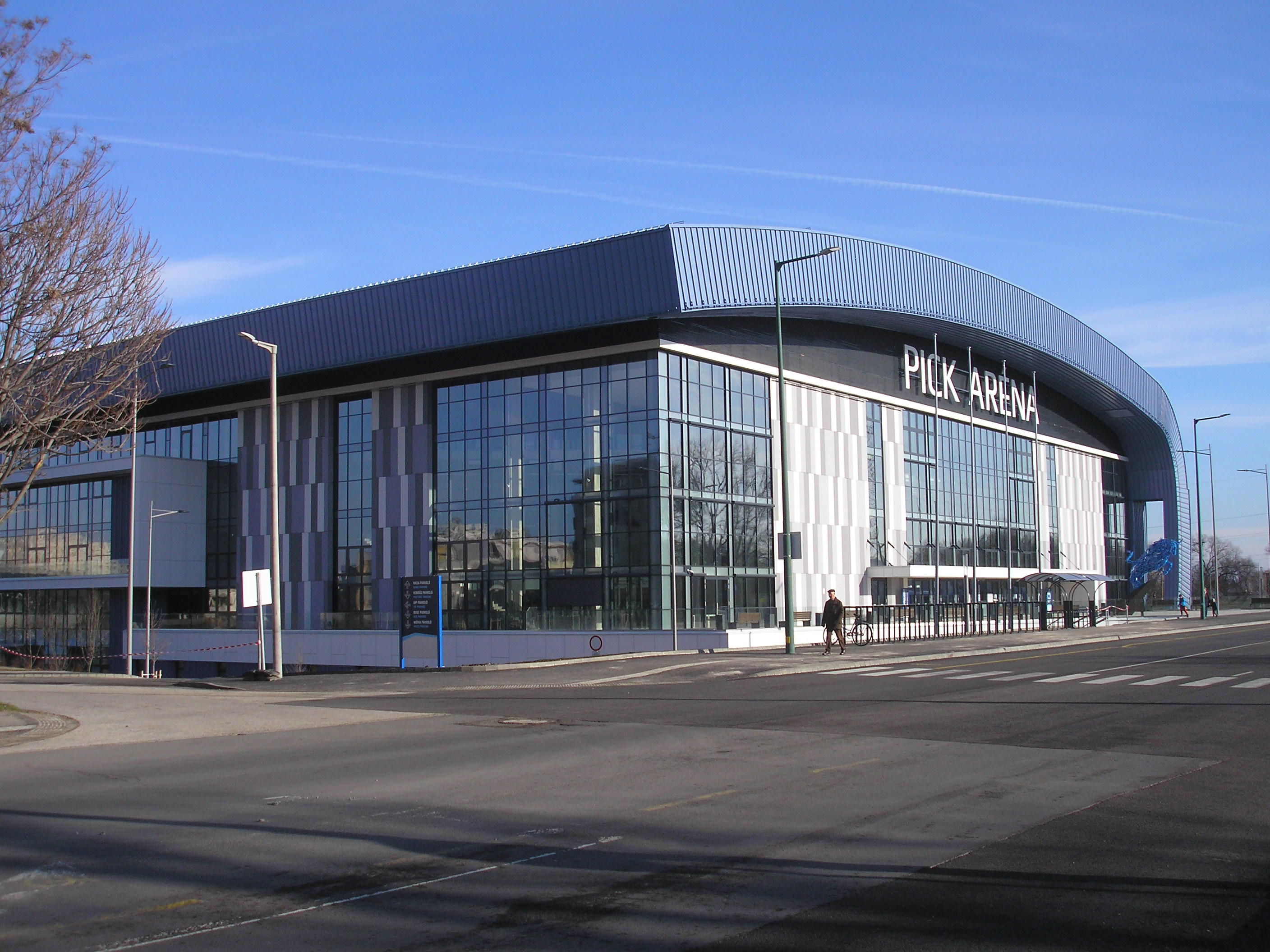
Home hall: Pick Aréna

- Name: Pick Aréna
- City: Szeged
- Capacity: 8143
- Address: 6723 Szeged, Felső Tisza-Part 35.

== Team ==
=== Current squad ===
Squad for the 2026–27 season

Goalkeepers

- 1 (Hungary) Attila Radvánszki
- 16 (Hungary) Roland Mikler
- 80 (Switzerland) Nikola Portner

Left wings

- 18 (Croatia) Marin Jelinić
- 25 (Austria) Sebastian Frimmel

Right wings

- 24 (Croatia) Mario Šoštarić
- 93 (Hungary) Benjámin Szilágyi

Line players

- 23 (Hungary) Márton Furka
- 27 (Hungary) Bence Bánhidi (c)
- 31 (France) Jérémy Toto
- 45 (Hungary) Miklós Rosta

Left backs

- 13 (Hungary) Máté Fazekas
- 44 (North Macedonia) Dmytro Horiha
- 51 (Slovenia) Borut Mačkovšek

Playmakers

- 7 (Hungary) Péter Lukács
- 17 (Hungary) Kristóf Csörgő
- 34 (Serbia) Lazar Kukić

Right backs

- 11 (Sweden) Lukas Sandell
- 77 (Norway) Magnus Abelvik Rød
- 97 (Hungary) Dávid Matics

=== Transfers ===
Transfers for the 2026–27 season

Joining

- (Switzerland) Nikola Portner (GK) from (Germany) SC Magdeburg
- (Sweden) Lukas Sandell (RB) from (Germany) Rhein-Neckar Löwen
- (North Macedonia) Dmytro Horiha (LB) from (North Macedonia) RK Vardar
- (Hungary) Miklós Rosta (LP) from (Romania) Dinamo București
- (Hungary) Péter Lukács (CB) from (Norway) Elverum Håndball
- (Hungary) Marko Eklemović (CB) from (Hungary) Győri ETO-UNI FKC
- (Hungary) Kristóf Csörgő (CB) from (Hungary) Ferencvárosi TC

Leaving

- (Iceland) Janus Daði Smárason (CB) to (Spain) FC Barcelona
- (Spain) Imanol Garciandia (RB) to (France) HBC Nantes
- (Sweden) Tobias Thulin (GK) to (Portugal) S.L. Benfica
- (Russia) Gleb Kalarash (LP) to (Croatia) RK Zagreb
- (Serbia) Jovica Nikolić (RB) to (Croatia) RK Zagreb
- (Hungary) Richárd Bodó (LB) to (Hungary) MOL Tatabánya KC
- (Hungary) Marko Eklemović (CB) on loan at (Hungary) Győri ETO-UNI FKC

=== Staff ===
- (Sweden) Head Coach: Michael Apelgren
- (Sweden) Assistant Coach: Jonas Källman
- (Hungary) Goalkeeper Coach: József Farkas Jr.
- (Hungary) Performance Enhancement Specialist: István Répásy
- (Hungary) Club Doctor: Csaba Janka, MD
- (Serbia) Therapist: Đorđe Ignjatovic
- (Hungary) Masseur: Zoltán Solti

=== Transfer history ===
Transfers for the 2025–26 season

Joining

- (Sweden) Jim Gottfridsson (CB) from (Germany) SG Flensburg-Handewitt
- (Hungary) Attila Radvánszki (GK) from (Hungary) MOL Tatabánya KC
- (Hungary) Máté Fazekas (LB) from (Hungary) Győri ETO-UNI FKC
- (Serbia) Jovica Nikolić (RB) from (Kuwait) Burgan SC

Leaving

- (Hungary) Martin Nagy (GK) to (Sweden) OV Helsingborg HK
- (Hungary) Barnabás Rea (CB) to (Iceland) Stjarnan
- (Sweden) Jim Gottfridsson (CB) to (Sweden) IFK Ystad

== Top scorers ==
Top scorers for each season in competition are:

Season	Player	Apps	Goals
2004–2005	(Hungary) Ferenc Ilyés	22	99
2005–2006	(Hungary) (Serbia) Milorad Krivokapić	28	132
2006–2007	(Hungary) Ferenc Ilyés	31	129
2007–2008	(Romania) Valentin Ghionea	31	154
2008–2009	(Romania) Valentin Ghionea	30	144
2009–2010	(Slovenia) Luka Žvižej	25	172
2010–2011	(Hungary) Máté Lékai	29	147
2011–2012	(Hungary) Gábor Ancsin	26	116
2012–2013	(Sweden) Jonas Larholm	22	110
2013–2014	(Sweden) Jonas Larholm	28	147
2014–2015	(Serbia) Rajko Prodanović	32	138
2015–2016	(Slovenia) Dean Bombač	32	126
2016–2017	(Hungary) Zsolt Balogh	27	113
2017–2018	(Iceland) Stefán Rafn Sigurmannsson	27	140
2018–2019	(Iceland) Stefán Rafn Sigurmannsson	23	106
2019–2020	Cancelled		
2020–2021	(Serbia) Bogdan Radivojević	25	136
2021–2022	(Serbia) Bogdan Radivojević	27	110
2022–2023	(Hungary) Miklós Rosta	29	157
2023–2024	(Croatia) Mario Šoštarič	28	139
2024–2025	(Croatia) Mario Šoštarič	26	138

== Honours ==
Honours	No.	Years
League
Nemzeti Bajnokság I Winners	5	1995–96, 2006–07, 2017–18, 2020–21, 2021–22
Nemzeti Bajnokság I Runners-up	21	1985, 1993–94, 2001–02, 2002–03, 2003–04, 2004–05, 2005–06, 2007–08, 2008–09, 2009–10, 2010–11, 2011–12, 2012–13, 2013–14, 2014–15, 2015–16, 2016–17, 2018–19, 2022–23, 2023–24, 2024–25
Nemzeti Bajnokság I Third place	11	1979, 1983, 1986, 1989–90, 1992–93, 1994–95, 1996–97, 1997–98, 1998–99, 1999–00, 2000–01
Nemzeti Bajnokság I/B Winners	1	1975
Domestic Cups
Magyar Kupa Winners	8	1977, 1982, 1983 jan. 1992–93, 2005–06, 2007–08, 2018–19, 2024–25
Magyar Kupa Runners-up	18	1995–96, 1999–00, 2001–02, 2002–03, 2003–04, 2004–05, 2008–09, 2009–10, 2011–12, 2012–13, 2013–14, 2014–15, 2015–16, 2016–17, 2017–18, 2020–21, 2022–23, 2023–24
Magyar Kupa Third place	6	1979, 1980, 1983 dec. 1997–98, 2021–22, 2025–26
Best European Results
EHF Champions League Quarterfinal	6	1997, 2004, 2015, 2017, 2019, 2025
EHF Cup Winners' Cup Semi-final	3	1983, 1984, 1994
EHF Cup Winners	1	2014
EHF City Cup Semi-final	1	1996

== Seasons ==
=== Season to season ===
As of 15 June 2025

- Seasons in Nemzeti Bajnokság I: 44
- Seasons in Nemzeti Bajnokság I/B: 6
- Seasons in Nemzeti Bajnokság II: 4

Season	Tier	Division	Place	Magyar Kupa
1962	4	City	1st	Was not held
1963	3	MB I	1st	
1964	2	NB II Közép	3rd	
1965	2	NB II Közép	9th	

Season	Tier	Division	Place	Magyar Kupa
1966	2	NB II Közép	3rd	
1967	2	NB II Közép	4th	
1968	2*	NB I/B	9th	
1969	2	NB I/B	9th	

Season	Tier	Division	Place	Magyar Kupa
1970	2	NB I/B	9th	
1971	2	NB I/B	6th	
1972	2	NB I/B	8th	
1973	2	NB I/B	8th	
1974	2	NB I/B	4th	
1975	2	NB I/B	1st	Was not held
1976	1	NB I	10th	
1977	1	NB I	9th	
1978	1	NB I	4th	
1979	1	NB I	Third place	Third place
1980	1	NB I	6th	Third place
1981	1	NB I	6th	
1982	1	NB I	4th	Winners
1983	1	NB I	Third place	Winners*
1983	1	NB I	Third place	Third place*
1984	1	NB I	5th	
1985	1	NB I	Runners-up	
1986	1	NB I	Third place	
1987	1	NB I	9th	
only Magyar Kupa was held in 1988				
1988–89	1	NB I	8th	

Season	Tier	Division	Place	Magyar Kupa
1989–90	1	NB I	Third place	
1990–91	1	NB I	10th	
1991–92	1	NB I	5th	
1992–93	1	NB I	Third place	Winners
1993–94	1	NB I	Runners-up	Fourth place
1994–95	1	NB I	Third place	
1995–96	1	NB I	Champions	Finalist
1996–97	1	NB I	Third place	Fourth place
1997–98	1	NB I	Third place	Third place
1998–99	1	NB I	Third place	
1999–00	1	NB I	Third place	Finalist
2000–01	1	NB I	Third place	
2001–02	1	NB I	Runners-up	Finalist
2002–03	1	NB I	Runners-up	Finalist
2003–04	1	NB I	Runners-up	Finalist
2004–05	1	NB I	Runners-up	Finalist
2005–06	1	NB I	Runners-up	Winners
2006–07	1	NB I	Champions	Round of 16
2007–08	1	NB I	Runners-up	Winners
2008–09	1	NB I	Runners-up	Finalist
2009–10	1	NB I	Runner-up	Finalist

Season	Tier	Division	Place	Magyar Kupa
2010–11	1	NB I	Runners-up	Round of 16
2011–12	1	NB I	Runners-up	Finalist
2012–13	1	NB I	Runners-up	Finalist
2013–14	1	NB I	Runner-up	Finalist
2014–15	1	NB I	Runner-up	Finalist
2015–16	1	NB I	Runner-up	Finalist
2016–17	1	NB I	Runners-up	Finalist
2017–18	1	NB I	Champions	Finalist
2018–19	1	NB I	Runner-up	Winners
2019–20	1	NB I	Cancelled due COVID-19	
2020–21	1	NB I	Champions	Finalist
2021–22	1	NB I	Champions	Third place
2022–23	1	NB I	Runners-up	Finalist
2023–24	1	NB I	Runners-up	Finalist
2024–25	1	NB I	Runners-up	Winners
2025–26	1	NB I		Third place

=== In European competition ===
- Participations in Champions League: 18x
- Participations in EHF Cup (IHF Cup): 10x
- Participations in Challenge Cup (City Cup): 3x
- Participations in Cup Winners' Cup (IHF Cup Winners' Cup): 6x

=== EHF Champions League ===
Season	Round	Club	Home	Away	Aggregate
2020–21	Group stage Group A	(Poland) Łomża Vive Kielce	26–30	23–26	6th place
2020–21	Group stage Group A	(Portugal) Porto	35–31	19–25	6th place
2020–21	Group stage Group A	(Norway) Elverum Håndball	36–27	10–0	6th place
2020–21	Group stage Group A	(Germany) SG Flensburg-Handewitt	0–10	24–26	6th place
2020–21	Group stage Group A	(France) Paris Saint-Germain HB	29–32	0–10	6th place
2020–21	Group stage Group A	(Belarus) Meshkov Brest	30–27	24–26	6th place
2020–21	Group stage Group A	(North Macedonia) Vardar 1961	34–33	28–26	6th place
2020–21	Play-offs	(Germany) THW Kiel	28–33	28–33	56–66
2024–25	Group stage Group B	(Spain) Barça	29–29	31–30	5th place
2024–25	Group stage Group B	(Germany) SC Magdeburg	31–29	31–24	5th place
2024–25	Group stage Group B	(Denmark) Aalborg Håndbold	30–32	29–28	5th place
2024–25	Group stage Group B	(Poland) Industria Kielce	28–27	31–35	5th place
2024–25	Group stage Group B	(Croatia) RK Zagreb	26–27	30–35	5th place
2024–25	Group stage Group B	(France) HBC Nantes	33–32	32–29	5th place
2024–25	Group stage Group B	(Norway) Kolstad Håndball	27–29	33–36	5th place
2024–25	Play-offs	(France) Paris Saint-Germain HB	30–31	35–25	65–56
2024–25	Quarter-finals	(Spain) Barça	24–27	29–30	54–56

== EHF ranking ==
As of 25 September 2025

Rank	Team	Points
10	(France) Montpellier Handball	446
11	(Portugal) Sporting CP	435
12	(Poland) Łomża Vive Kielce	428
13	(Hungary) OTP Bank – Pick Szeged	417
14	(Poland) Wisła Płock	383
15	(Denmark) GOG Håndbold	331
16	(Romania) Dinamo București	322

== Former club members ==
=== Retired numbers ===
SC Pick Szeged retired numbers
N°	Nationality	Player	Position	Tenure
8	(Sweden)	Jonas Källman	Left wing	2014–2021

=== Notable former players ===
- (Hungary) Gábor Ancsin (2011–2016)
- (Hungary) Szabolcs Zubai (2008–2018)
- (Hungary) György Avar
- (Hungary) Béla Árvai
- (Hungary) Sándor Bajusz
- (Hungary) Zsolt Balogh (2012–2019)
- (Hungary) Zoltán Bartalos
- (Hungary) Csaba Bartók (1990–2000)
- (Hungary) Csaba Bendó
- (Hungary) Róbert Berta
- (Hungary) Dániel Buday (1999–2003; 2011–2013)
- (Hungary) Ferenc Buday
- (Hungary) József Czina (2004–2005, 2011–2014)
- (Hungary) (Serbia) Nikola Eklemović (1999–2004)
- (Hungary) József Farkas
- (Hungary) Bálint Fekete (2011–2018)
- (Hungary) Róbert Fekete (1985–1987, 1989–1996, 2001)
- (Hungary) Máté Gidai
- (Hungary) Márk Hegedűs
- (Hungary) Gábor Herbert (2005–2011)
- (Hungary) Ferenc Ilyés (2000–2007; 2013–2016)
- (Hungary) Dávid Katzirz (2008–2011)
- (Hungary) (Serbia) Marinko Kekezović (2012–2014)
- (Hungary) Attila Kotormán
- (Hungary) (Serbia) Milorad Krivokapić (2005–2010)
- (Hungary) Balázs Laluska (1998–2005, 2008–2009)
- (Hungary) Ambrus Lele
- (Hungary) Máté Lékai (2010–2012)
- (Hungary) Richárd Mezei
- (Hungary) Roland Mikler (2010–2014)
- (Hungary) László Nagy (1997–2000)
- (Hungary) Béla Oláh
- (Hungary) Zoltán Oláh
- (Hungary) Zsolt Perger
- (Hungary) (Serbia) Nenad Puljezević (2002–2009)
- (Hungary) Miklós Rosta (2019–2023)
- (Hungary) László Skaliczki
- (Hungary) István Sándor
- (Hungary) László Szabó "Sonka"
- (Hungary) Sándor Tamás
- (Hungary) Endre Tenke
- (Hungary) Géza Tóth
- (Hungary) (Slovakia) Mihály Tóth
- (Hungary) Szabolcs Törő (2010–2012)
- (Hungary) Attila Vadkerti (2000–2015)
- (Hungary) Péter Tatai (2010–2014)
- (Bosnia and Herzegovina) Nikola Prce (2013–2014)
- (Bosnia and Herzegovina) Vladimir Vranješ (2013–2016)
- (Brazil) Thiagus Petrus (2015–2018)
- (Croatia) Mario Bjeliš (2008–2009)
- (Croatia) Mirko Alilović (2018–2023)
- (Croatia) Igor Kos (2009–2010)
- (Croatia) Ivan Sršen (2018)
- (Croatia) Marin Šego (2016–2019)
- (Croatia) Antonio Pribanić (2011–2013)
- (Croatia) Denis Buntic (2016–2017)
- (Croatia) Alen Blažević (2012–2020)
- (Czech Republic) Stanislav Kašpárek (2018–2021)
- (Iceland) Stefán Rafn Sigurmannsson (2017–2021)
- (Moldova) Maxim Butenko
- (Montenegro) Ratko Đurković (2004–2008)
- (Montenegro) Marko Lasica (2013–2014)
- (Montenegro) Vladimir Osmajić (2007–2010)
- (Norway) Alexander Blonz (2021–2023)
- (Norway) Kent Robin Tønnesen (2021–2023)
- (Romania) Valentin Ghionea (2007–2010)
- (Romania) Iulian Stamate
- (Romania) Adrian Petrea
- (Russia) Sergei Gorbok (2016–2018)
- (Russia) Dmitry Zhitnikov (2017–2021)
- (Serbia) Danijel Anđelković (2004–2010)
- (Serbia) Dalibor Brajdić
- (Serbia) Marko Ćuruvija (2015–2016)
- (Serbia) Nedeljko Jovanović (2006–2007)
- (Serbia) Dragan Marjanac (2007–2010)
- (Serbia) Vladan Matić (2002–2007)
- (Serbia) Petar Nenadić (2008–2010)
- (Serbia) Dusan Beocanin
- (Serbia) Nenad Peruničić (2005–2006)
- (Serbia) Bogdan Radivojević (2019–2023)
- (Serbia) Rajko Prodanović (2011–2013, 2014–2016)
- (Slovakia) František Šulc (2010–2014)
- (Slovakia) Martin Straňovský (2020–2021)
- (Slovakia) Tomáš Straňovský (2009–2011)
- (Slovenia) Dean Bombač (2014–2016; 2018–2024)
- (Slovenia) Luka Žvižej (2007–2010)
- (Slovenia) Nik Henigman (2018–2022)
- (Slovenia) Staš Skube (2016–2018)
- (Spain) Niko Mindegía (2013–2016)
- (Spain) Roberto García Parrondo (2013–2016)
- (Spain) José Manuel Sierra (2014–2018)
- (Spain) Antonio García Robledo (2014–2016)
- (Spain) Jorge Maqueda (2018–2020)
- (Spain) Joan Cañellas (2018–2021)
- (Sweden) Jonas Källman (2014–2021)
- (Sweden) Jonas Larholm (2012–2014)

=== Notable coaches ===
Dates	Name
1974–1980	(Hungary) Árpád Kővári
1980–1981	(Hungary) Ferenc Buday
1981–1983	(Hungary) László Boros Gy.
1983–1984	(Hungary) Márton Ludányi
1985–1987	(Hungary) István Lesti

Dates	Name
1987–1989	(Hungary) Árpád Kővári (2x)
1989–1991	(Hungary) Zsolt Barabás
1991–1995	(Hungary) Árpád Kővári (3x)
1995–1998	(Hungary) László Skaliczki
1998–1999	(Hungary) Ferenc Buday (2x)

Dates	Name
1999–2000	(Hungary) György Koleszár
2000	(Hungary) Árpád Kővári
2001–2003	(Serbia) Dragan Đukić
2003–2006	(Hungary) Péter Kovács
2006–2007	(Serbia) Zoran Kurteš

Dates	Name
2007–2009	(Serbia) Vladan Matić
2009–2010	(Serbia) Dragan Đukić (2x)
2010–2013	(Hungary) László Skaliczki (2x)
2013–2023	(Spain) Juan Carlos Pastor
2023–2024	(Hungary) Krisztián Kárpáti
2024–	(Sweden) Michael Apelgren

== See also ==
- Pick Szeged
