= Miklós Rosta =

Hungarian handballer (born 1999)

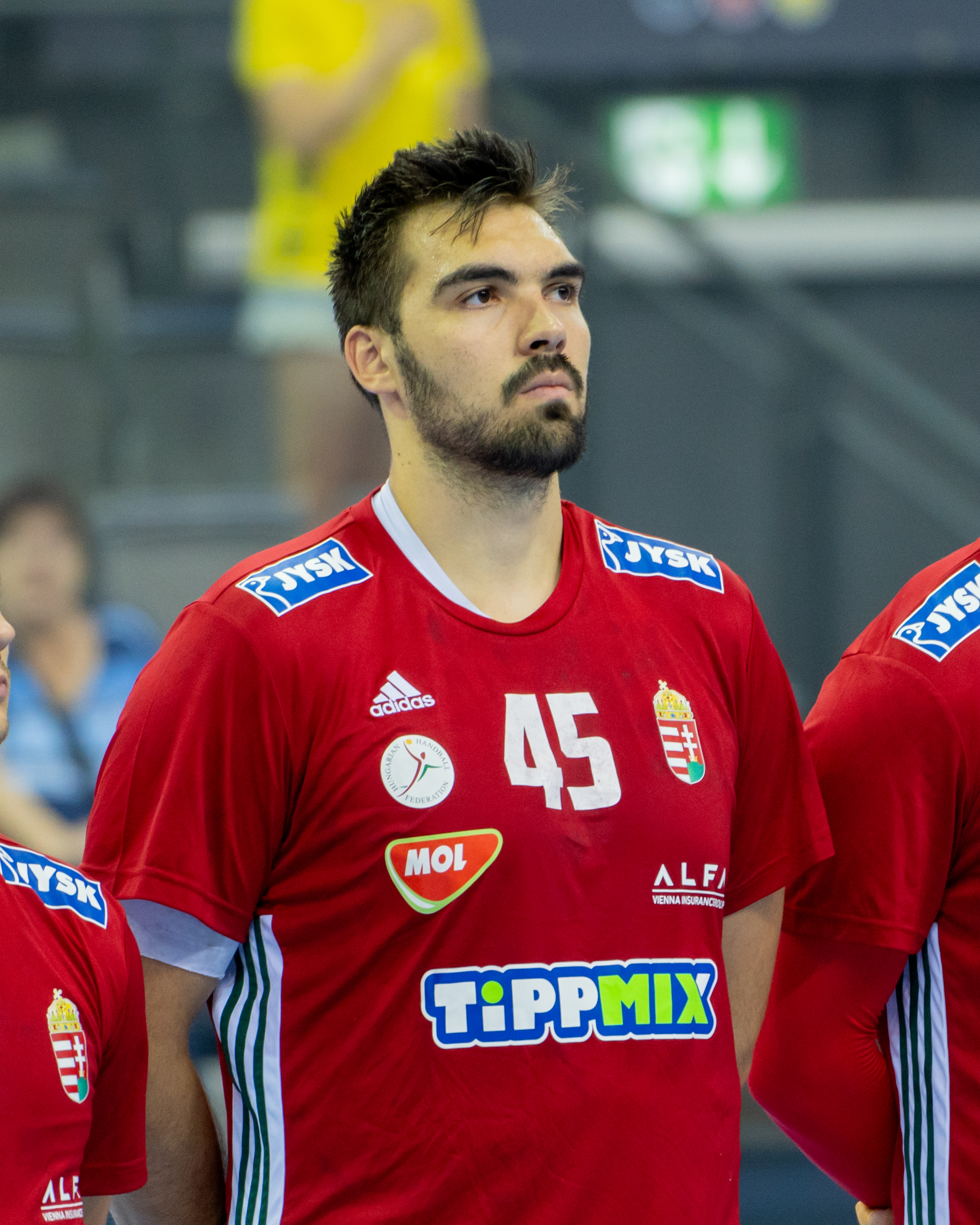

Personal information
- Nationality: Hungarian
- Born: 14 February 1999 (age 27) Győr, Hungary
- Height: 2.03 m (6 ft 8 in)

Sport
- Sport: Handball
- Position: Pivot
- Current club: Dinamo București
- Number: 45

Senior clubs
- Years: Team
- 2015–2019: Tatabánya KC
- 2019–2023: SC Pick Szeged
- 2023–2026: Dinamo București
- 2026–: OTP Bank – Pick Szeged
National team
Years	Team	Apps	(Gls)
2019–	Hungary	93	(257)

Miklós Rosta (born 14 February 1999) is a Hungarian handball player for Dinamo București and the Hungarian national team.

== Achievements ==
Domestic Competition

- Nemzeti Bajnokság:
  - Winner: 2021, 2022

== Awards and recognition ==
- Hungarian Handballer of the Year: 2022, 2023
- Nemzeti Bajnokság I Top Scorer: 2023
