= Pick Aréna =

Handball arena in Hungary

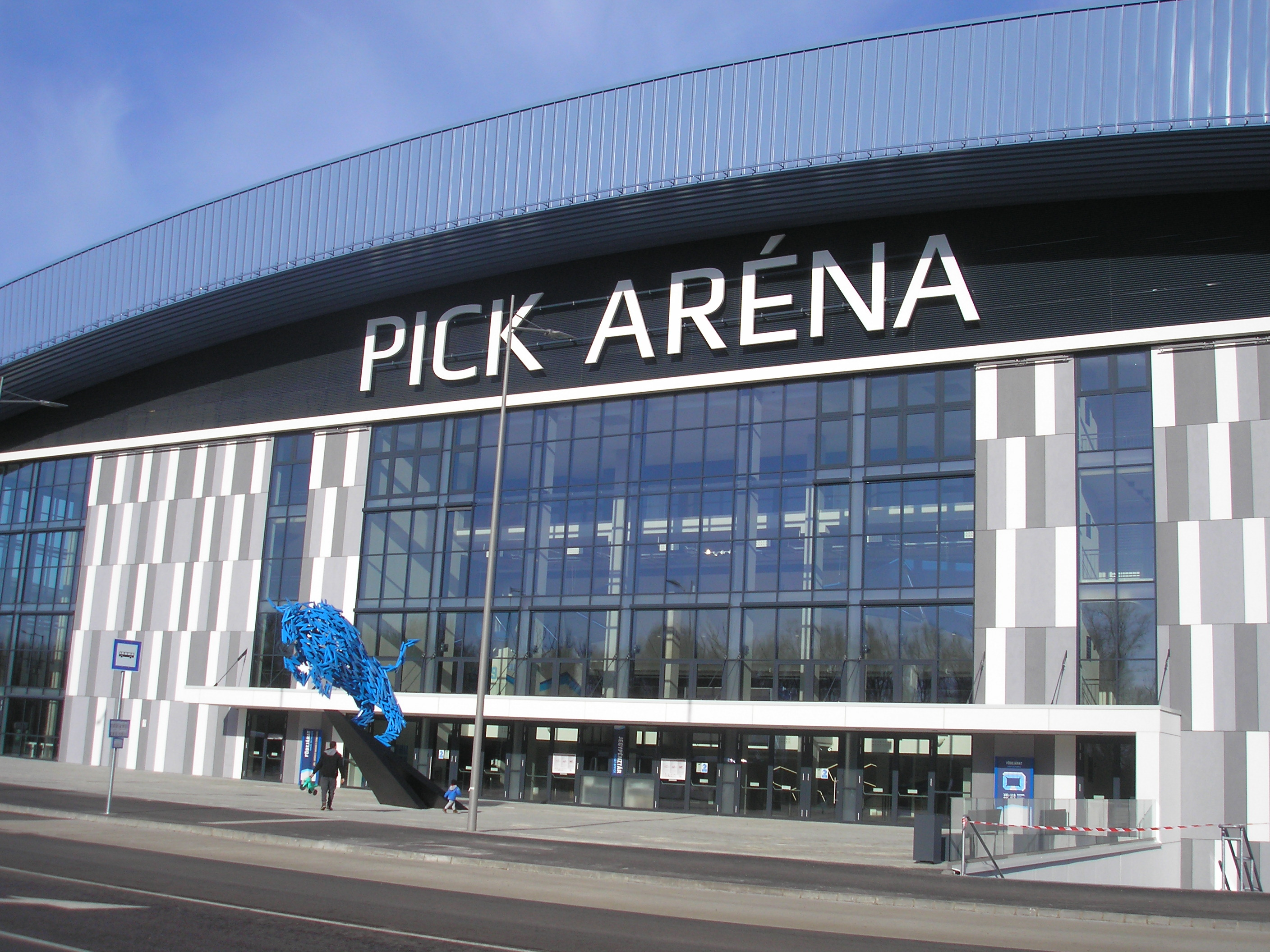
- Interactive map of Pick Aréna
- Coordinates: 46°15′33.27″N 20°10′27.41″E
- Owner: SC Pick Szeged
- Capacity: 10 000 (concert); 8 143 (handball)

Construction
- Opened: 2021
- Construction cost: 37.2 billion HUF

Pick Aréna is an indoor sporting arena located in Szeged, Hungary. It is primarily used as a venue for handball, with the first match taking place between SC Pick Szeged and German team THW Kiel in the EHF Champions League, which Szeged won 30–26.

The arena hosted six matches as a venue for the 2022 European Men's Handball Championship.

== See also ==
- List of indoor arenas in Hungary
