= Benjámin Szilágyi =

Hungarian handball player (born 2003)

Personal information
- Nationality: Hungarian
- Born: 18 May 2003 (age 23) Szeged, Hungary
- Height: 1.89 m (6 ft 2 in)

Sport
- Sport: Handball
- Position: Right wing
- Current club: SC Pick Szeged
- Number: 93

Youth career
- Years: Team
- 2014–2020: SC Pick Szeged

Senior clubs
- Years: Team
- 2020–: SC Pick Szeged
- 2022–2023: → NEKA (loan)
National team
Years	Team	Apps	(Gls)
2026–	Hungary	2	(3)

Benjámin Szilágyi (born 18 May 2003) is a Hungarian handball player who plays for SC Pick Szeged and the Hungarian national team.

== Career ==
=== Club ===
Benjámin started his career at SC Pick Szeged in 2014. The talent spent his first seasons in the Szeged team's youth team. In the 2020/2021 season, he won a silver medal in Nemzeti Bajnokság I/B with the Pick Szeged U22 team. He scored 80 goals in 19 games. He also made his debut for the SC Pick Szeged senior team in the Nemzeti Bajnokság I in this 2020/2021 season, scoring 7 goals in 8 matches. In the 2021/2022 season, he scored 129 goals in 26 games in Nemzeti Bajnokság I/B and 5 goals in 5 games in Nemzeti Bajnokság I. He spent the 2022/2023 season on loan at NEKA, also in the Nemzeti Bajnokság I. He scored 62 goals in 26 games. He returned to the SC Pick Szeged team in the summer of 2023. He also made his EHF Champions League debut in September 2023: in the Szeged-Aalborg 34-27 match. Benjámin scored 1 goal.

=== National team ===
He was 9th with the Hungarian team at the 2021 Youth European Championship. The captain of the Hungarian national team, Chema Rodríguez, also noticed his performance, who invited him to practice with the national team from September 30 to October 4, 2024, and then invited him to train with the national team between December 12 and December 17, 2025. He made his debut for the Hungary men's national handball team in January 2026 in Győr in a training match against the Romania men's national handball team, in which he scored 3 goals: Hungary-Romania 33–23. Chema Rodríguez, the national team's head coach, called him up to the senior national team preparing for the 2026 European Men's Handball Championship, due to Zsolt Krakovszki's injury, but he did not play in a single match at the European Championship.

== Honours ==
=== Club ===
Pick Szeged U22

- Nemzeti Bajnokság I/B
  - Silver: 2021

Pick Szeged

- Nemzeti Bajnokság I
  - Gold: 2021, 2022
  - Silver: 2024, 2025, 2026
- Magyar Kupa
  - Gold: 2025
  - Silver: 2021, 2024
  - Bronze: 2022, 2026
- Hungarian Supercup
  - Silver: 2026
