= Dmitry Zhitnikov =

Russian handball player

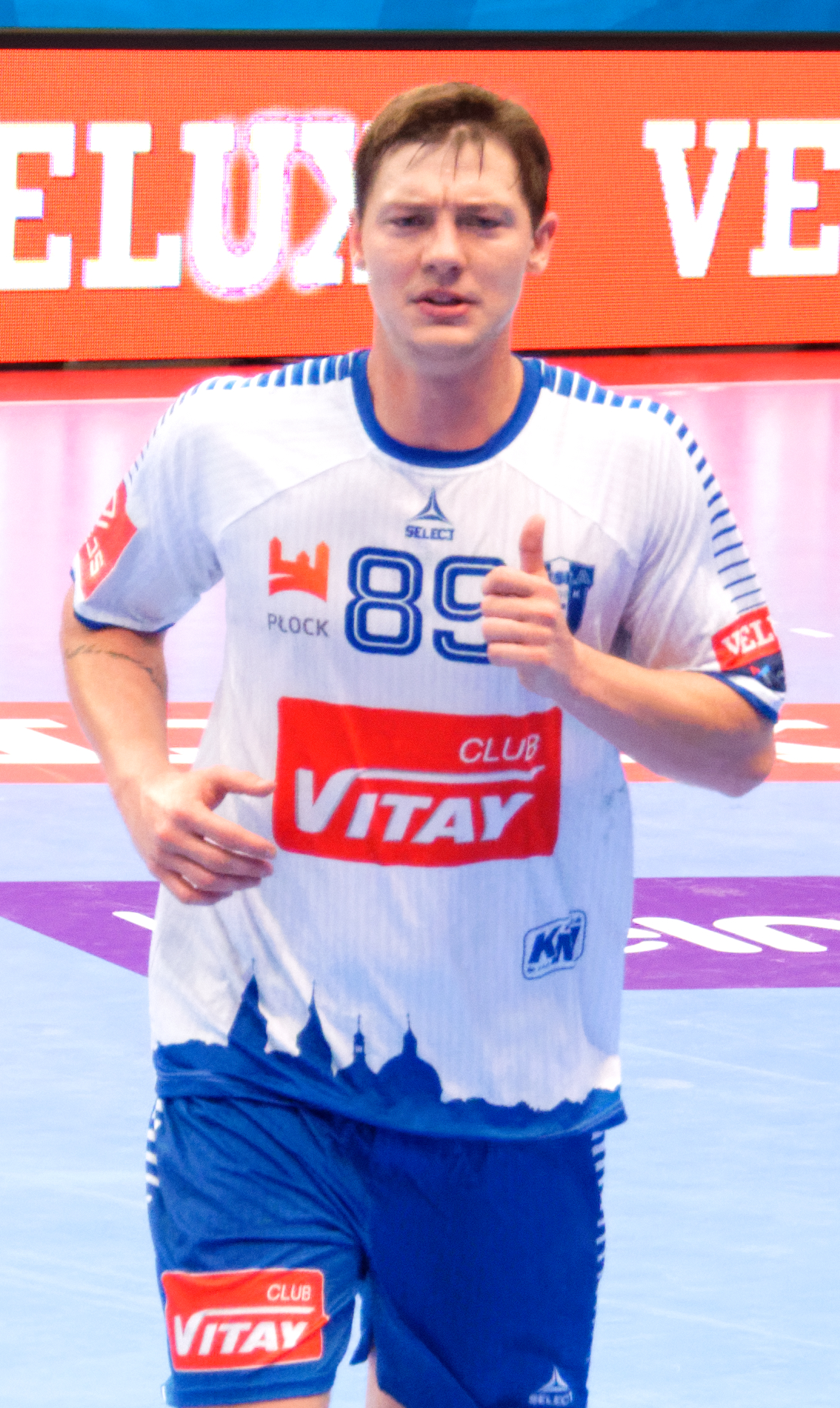

Personal information
- Nationality: Russian
- Born: 20 November 1989 (age 36) Zvolen, Slovakia
- Height: 1.95 m (6 ft 5 in)

Sport
- Sport: Handball
- Position: Centre back
- Current club: MOL-Tatabánya KC
- Number: 89

Senior clubs
- Years: Team
- 2010–2015: Chekhovskiye Medvedi
- 2015–2017: Wisła Płock
- 2017–2021: SC Pick Szeged
- 2021–2025: Wisła Płock
- 2025–: MOL Tatabánya KC
National team
| Years | Team | Apps | (Gls) |
| – | Russia | 125 | (320) |

Dmitry Valeryevich Zhitnikov (Russian: Дмитрий Валерьевич Житников; born 20 November 1989) is a Russian handball player for Wisła Płock and the Russian national team.
