= Stanislav Kašpárek =

Czech handball player

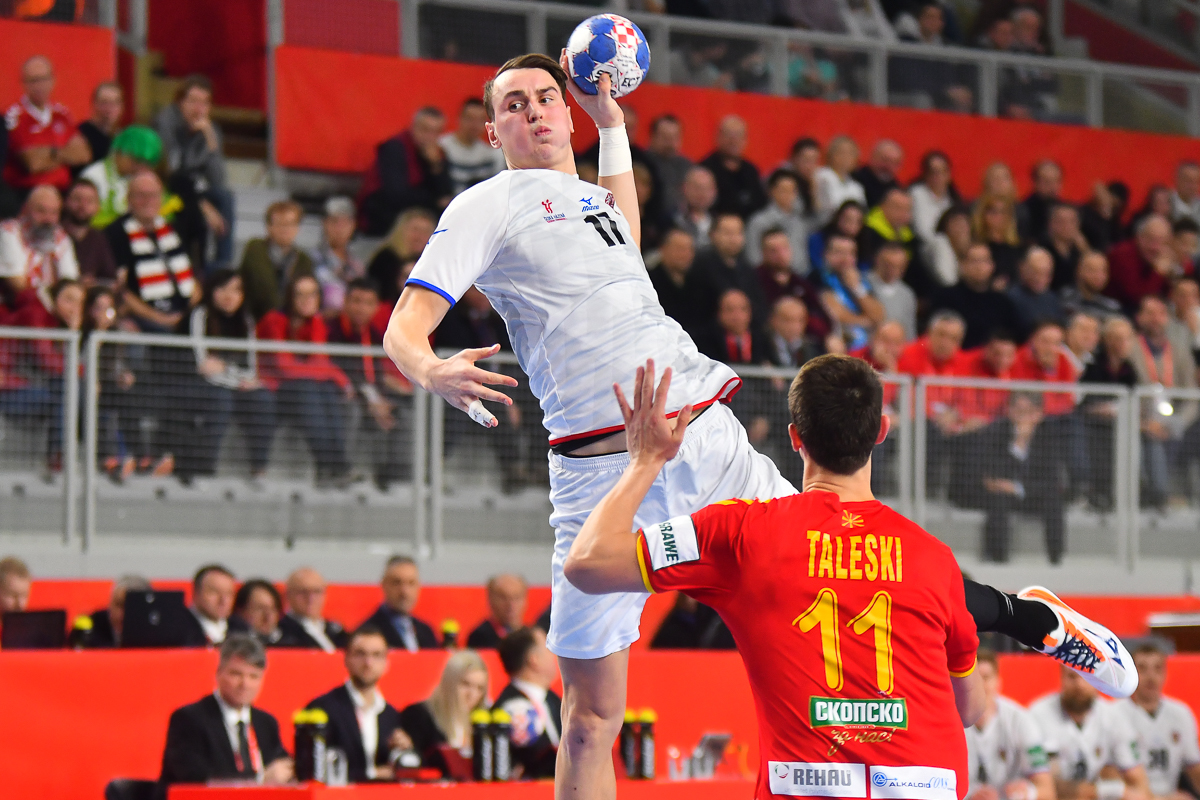
- Stanislav Kašpárek playing handball

Personal information
- Nationality: Czech
- Born: 11 June 1996 (age 30) Přerov, Czech Republic
- Height: 2.02 m (6 ft 8 in)

Sport
- Sport: Handball
- Position: Right back
- Current club: Dinamo București
- Number: 37

Senior clubs
- Years: Team
- –2015: HC Zubří
- 2015–2018: Balatonfüredi KSE
- 2018–2021: SC Pick Szeged
- 2021–2022: HC Meshkov Brest
- 2022–2025: Dinamo București
- 2025: → Al Ahly (loan)
- 2025–: Al Arabi SC
National team
Years	Team	Apps	(Gls)
2017-	Czech Republic	65	(217)
- Updated on 25 August 2024

Stanislav Kašpárek (born 11 June 1996) is a Czech handball player for Dinamo București and the Czech national team.

He participated at the 2018 European Men's Handball Championship.
