= Richárd Bodó =

Hungarian handball player (born 1993)

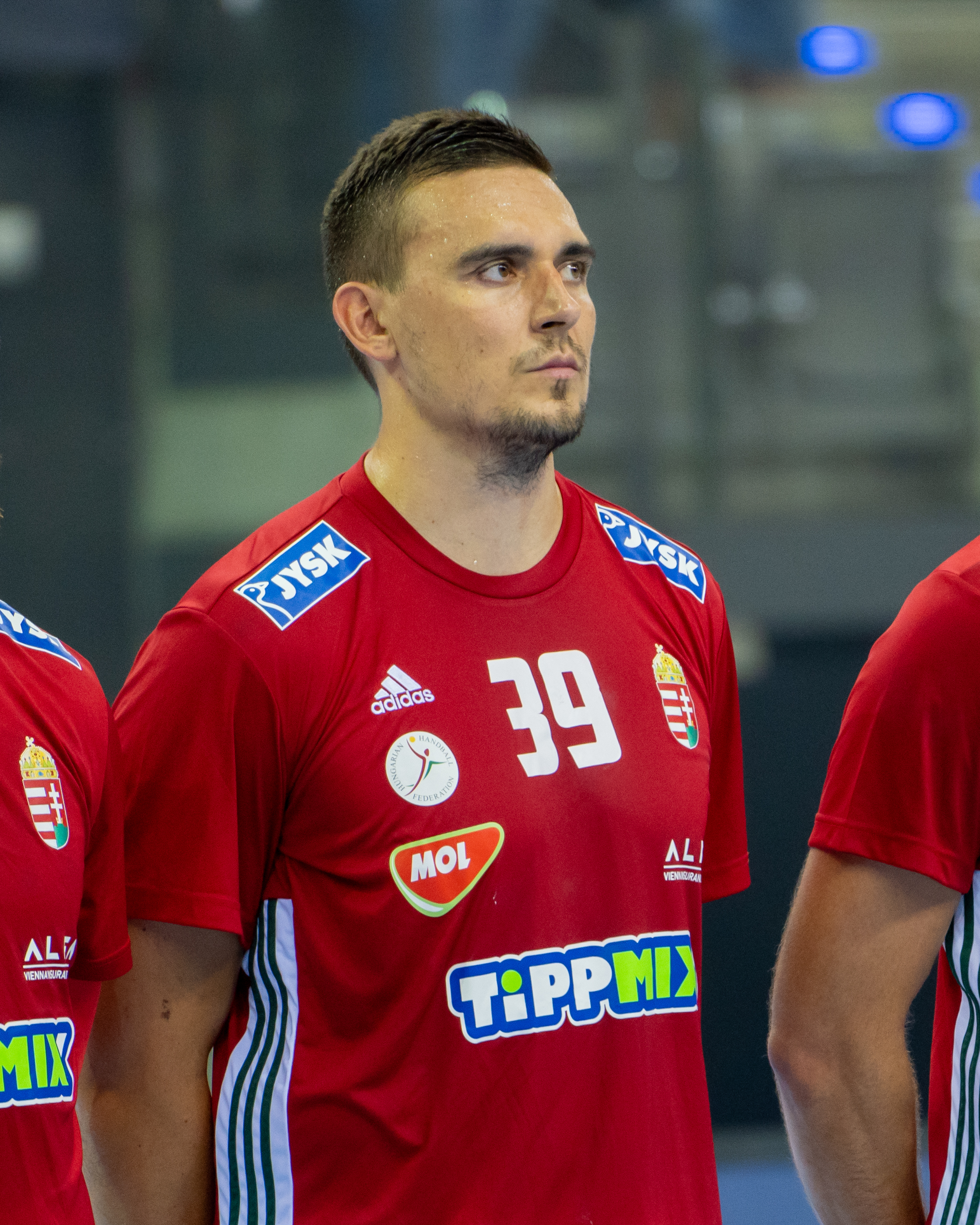
- Bodó in 2024

Personal information
- Nationality: Hungarian
- Born: 13 March 1993 (age 33) Mátészalka, Hungary
- Height: 2.03 m (6 ft 8 in)

Sport
- Sport: Handball
- Position: Left back
- Current club: MOL Tatabánya KC
- Number: 9

Senior clubs
- Years: Team
- 2010–2011: Dunaferr SE
- 2011–2016: Tatabánya KC
- 2016–2026: OTP Bank-Pick Szeged
- 2026–: Tatabánya KC
National team
Years	Team	Apps	(Gls)
2014–	Hungary	131	(379)

Richárd Bodó (born 13 March 1993) is a Hungarian handballer for MOL Tatabánya KC and the Hungarian national team.

He represented Hungary at the 2019 World Men's Handball Championship.

== Achievements ==
- Nemzeti Bajnokság I:
  - Winner: 2018, 2021, 2022
- Magyar Kupa
  - Winner: 2019, 2025

== Individual awards ==
- Hungarian Handballer of the Year: 2018
