= Vladan Matić =

Serbian handball player and coach (born 1970)

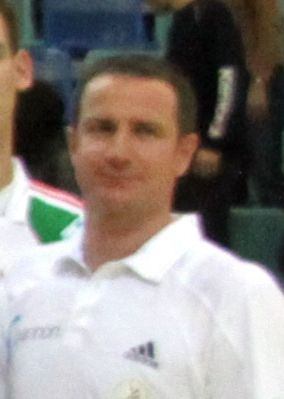
- Matić in 2010

Personal information
- Full name: Vladan Matić
- Nationality: Serbian / Hungarian
- Born: 28 April 1970 (age 56) Šabac, SR Serbia, SFR Yugoslavia
- Height: 1.81 m (5 ft 11 in)

Sport
- Sport: Handball
- Position: Left wing
- Current club: RK Vojvodina (head coach)

Youth career
- Years: Team
- –: RK Metaloplastika

Senior clubs
- Years: Team
- –: RK Metaloplastika
- 1993–1995: Partizan
- 1995–1997: Crvena zvezda
- 1997–2001: Partizan
- 2001–2007: Pick Szeged
National team
- Years: Team
- 1997–2004: Serbia and Montenegro

Teams managed
- 2007–2009: Pick Szeged
- 2008–2010: Hungary (assistant)
- 2009–2011: Ferencváros
- 2011–2013: Celje
- 2013–2014: Serbia
- 2014–2021: Grundfos Tatabánya KC
- 2018–2019: Hungary (co-coach)
- 2022–2024: RK Metaloplastika
- 2024–2025: Csurgói KK
- 2025–2026: RK Vojvodina
- 2026–: Pick Szeged (head of academy)
Medal record
Men's handball
Representing FR Yugoslavia
World Championship
Bronze medal – third place	1999 Egypt	Team
Bronze medal – third place	2001 France	Team

Vladan Matić (Serbian Cyrillic: Владан Матић; born 28 April 1970) is a Serbian former handball player and current coach of Hungarian club Grundfos Tatabánya KC. He also holds Hungarian citizenship.

== Playing career ==
Matić made his professional debut with his hometown club Metaloplastika. He later played for Partizan (1993–1995 and 1997–2001) and Crvena zvezda (1995–1997). In 2001, Matić moved abroad to Hungary and stayed with Pick Szeged until 2007.

Matić represented Serbia and Montenegro (known as FR Yugoslavia until 2003), winning two bronze medals at the World Championships (1999 and 2001). He also participated in the 2000 Summer Olympics and two European Championships (2002 and 2004).

== Coaching career ==
Matić started his coaching career at Pick Szeged in early 2007 and remained in charge until late 2009. He later coached Ferencváros (2009–2011) and Celje (2011–2013). In October 2013, Matić was named as head coach of the Serbia national team. He resigned from his position in June 2014. In 2018 he acquired Hungarian citizenship, and as well became the coach of the Hungary men's national handball team along with István Csoknyai which lasted until 2019. He is currently the head coach of Grundfos Tatabánya KC.
