= Pick Szeged =

Hungarian food company

Pick Szeged is a Hungarian company that produces a variety of meat products, most notably Winter salami. It was founded in 1869, and is based in Szeged, Hungary.

The company sponsors the Hungarian handball team SC Pick Szeged.

== Winter salami of Szeged ==
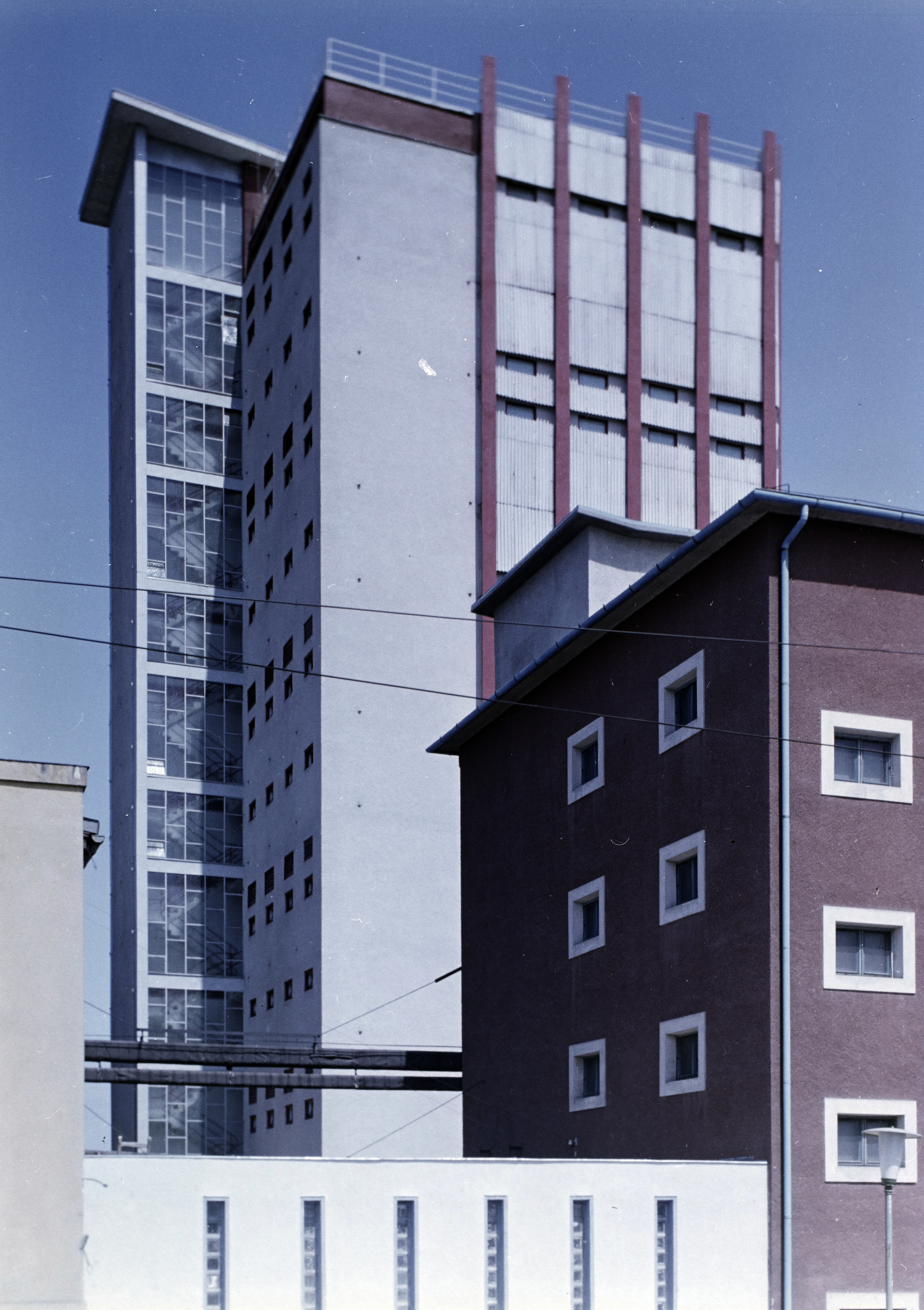
The salami factory

Winter salami (Pick Salami) is a traditional product made of a mixture of lean pork and fatty pork belly, and spiced according to a secret recipe. The mixture is pumped into casings, followed by cold beechwood smoke curing, a drying, and a ripening phase. Finally the salami becomes covered with noble mold. According to the original recipe, winter salami was made of donkey meat. After a while, however, there were insuffient donkey stock in Hungary. A new solution had to be found, and elder sow meat, which has a similar taste, replaced donkey meat.

One of the main characteristics of Pick Salami is that a coat of mould appears during the drying and maturation stages. Mold fungi need a chilly temperature and a suitable humidity to settle down. When cooling technology was introduced in the late 1950s, winter salami could now be made all year round.

== Szeged ==
Szeged lies on the banks of the Tisza river. Szeged and its surrounding region are favourable to plant cultivation and animal husbandry. The geographical conditions and related expertise is suitable for the breeding of high quality pigs used for the salami.

== History ==
The production of winter salami was introduced to Hungary by Mark Pick, a master butcher of Jewish origin. In 1869, Pick settled down and established a salami factory in Szeged, Hungary. By 1883, he brought in workers from Italy to help scale his salami production operations. After Pick's death in 1892, his widow and her brother took over operations. Pick's eldest son, Jenő joined the company in 1906. Jenő bought the nearby ‘Tian’ salami factory, which had become bankrupt. This enabled the Pick family to own substantial real estate along the Tisza river and they moved factory operations closer to the river. Jenő Pick was eager to modernise the business with the latest technology. Between the two world wars, Pick factory became a leading name in Hungarian food and the Pick salami became a global brand. Jenő Pick ran the factory from 1934 until it was nationalised in 1948. In 1992, the company became a public limited company under the name Pick Szeged Szalámigyár és Húsüzem Rt and it was privatised four years later.
