= Juan Carlos Pastor =

Spanish handball coach (born 1968)

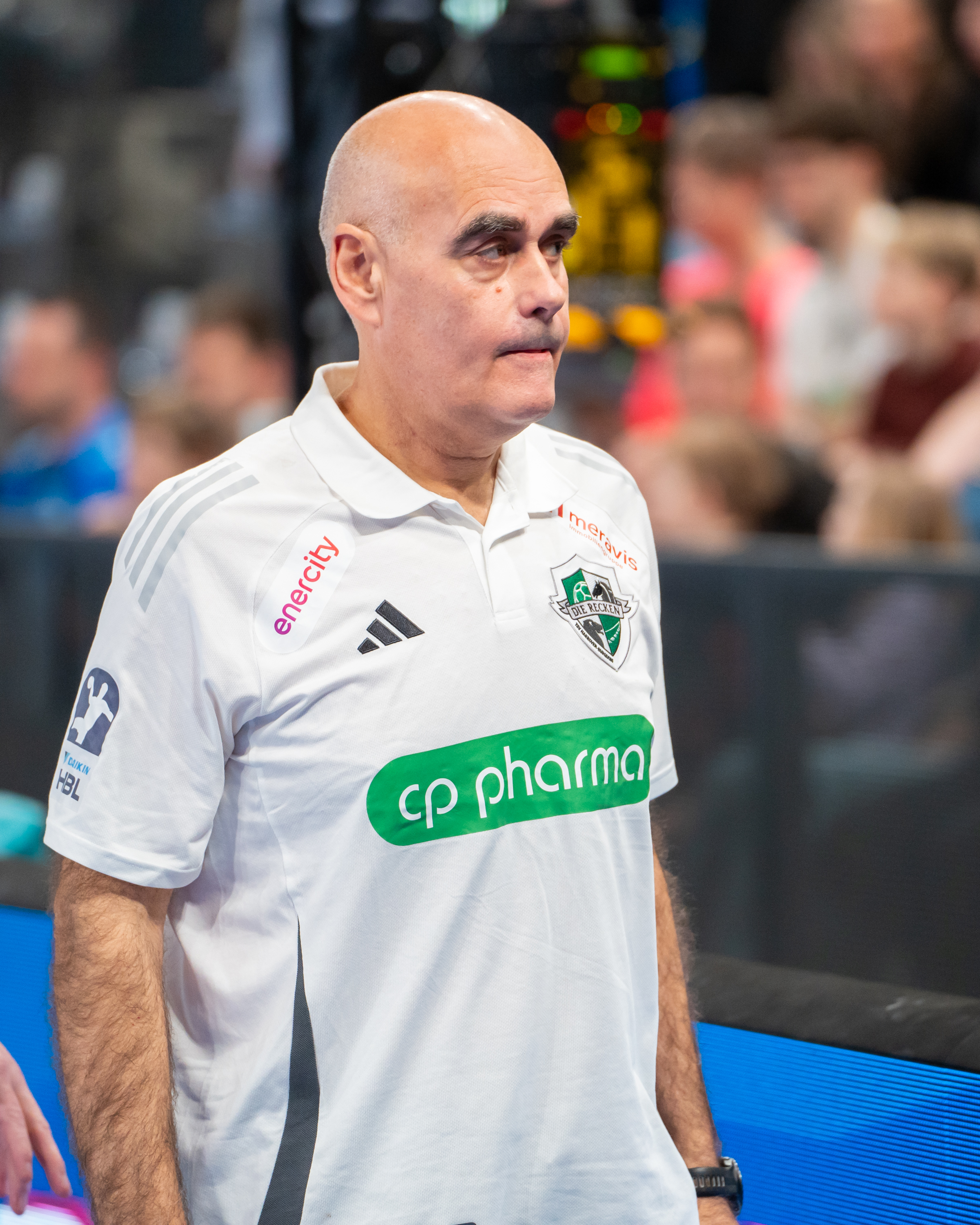

Personal information
- Nationality: Spanish
- Born: 18 May 1968 (age 58) Valladolid, Spain

Sport
- Sport: Handball

Teams managed
- Years: Team
- 1995–2013: BM Valladolid
- 2004–2008: Spain
- 2013–2023: SC Pick Szeged
- 2023–2025: Egypt

Juan Carlos Pastor (born 18 May 1968) is a Spanish handball coach.

== Club teams ==
From 1995 Pastor was coach of the Spanish team of BM Valladolid. With the club he won the Copa del Rey de Balonmano in 2005 and 2006 and the Copa ASOBAL in 2003. In the final of the 2003 EHF Men's Champions Trophy his team lost to FC Barcelona Handbol. In the EHF Cup Winners' Cup, Valladolid failed in the finals in 2004 against SDC San Antonio and in 2006 against Medvedi Chekhov. In 2009 his team was again in the final of the EHF Cup Winners' Cup, which Valladolid won against HSG Nordhorn.

In summer 2013 he took over the Hungarian club Pick Szeged. In the 2013/14 season he lost to the series champions KC Veszprém in both the Hungarian Cup final and the championship final. In the 2013–14 EHF Cup he won the title. In 2018, 2021 and 2022 Szeged won the Hungarian championship under his leadership. He left Szeged after the 2022/23 season; he and the club prematurely terminated his contract in Szeged, which ran until 2024.

== National teams ==
In addition to his work in Valladolid, Pastor was coach of the Spanish national team from December 2004 to the summer of 2008. With Spain he became world champion at the 2005 World Cup in Tunisia and runner-up at the 2006 European Championships in Switzerland. His team won the bronze medal at the 2008 Olympic Games.

In March 2023, he took over the training of the Egyptian national team until the Olympic Games in 2024, succeeding Roberto García.
