= Sebastian Frimmel =

Austrian handball player (born 1995)

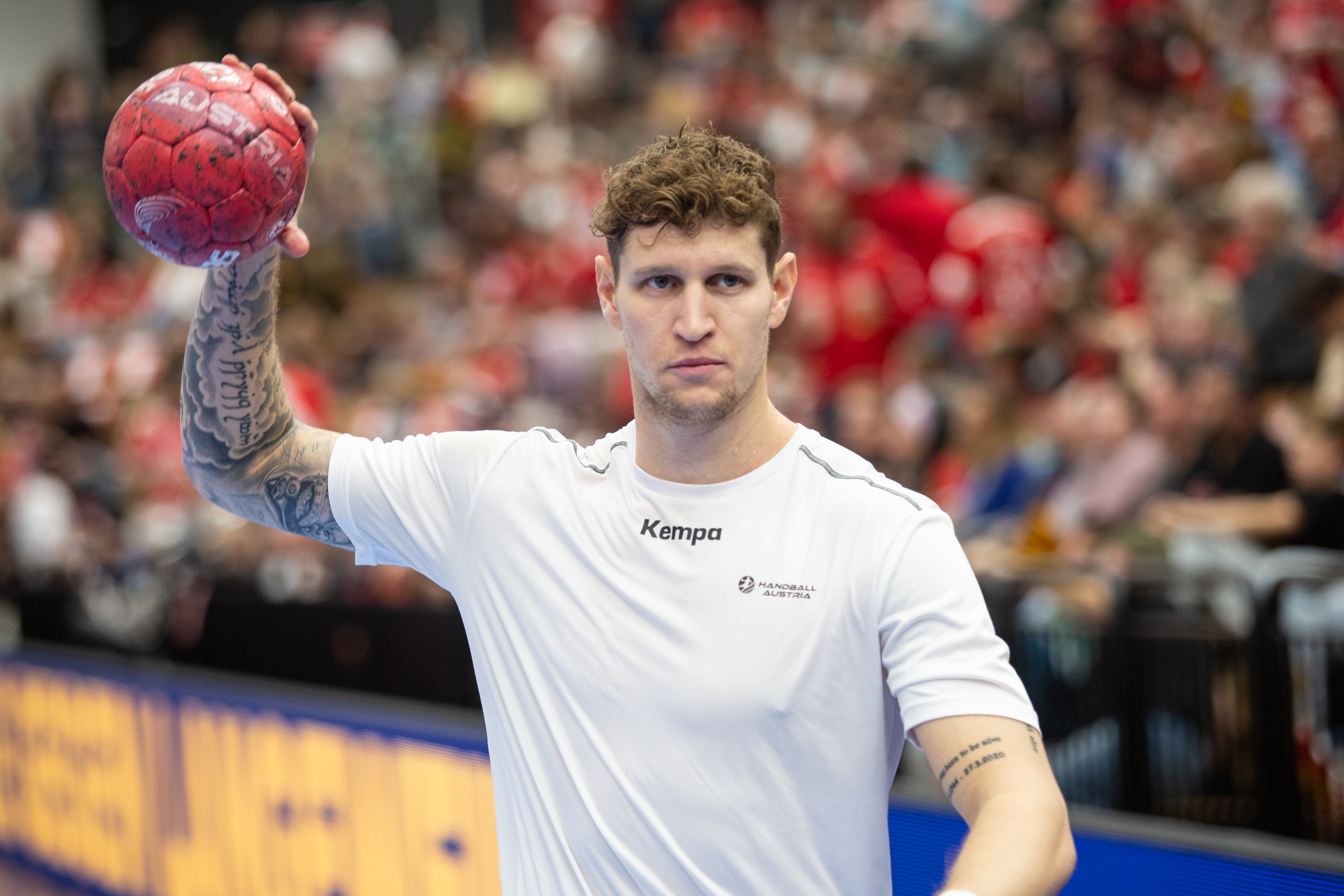

Personal information
- Nationality: Austrian
- Born: 18 December 1995 (age 30) Perchtoldsdorf, Austria
- Height: 1.90 m (6 ft 3 in)

Sport
- Sport: Handball
- Position: Left wing
- Current club: OTP Bank-Pick Szeged
- Number: 25

Senior clubs
- Years: Team
- 2013–2018: SG West Wien
- 2018–2021: Kadetten Schaffhausen
- 2021–: OTP Bank-Pick Szeged
National team
Years	Team	Apps	(Gls)
2014–	Austria	110	(373)
- Updated on 14 September 2024

Sebastian Frimmel (born 18 December 1995) is an Austrian handball player for OTP Bank-Pick Szeged and the Austrian national team.

He participated at the 2018 European Men's Handball Championship.
