= Matej Gaber =

Slovenian handball player (born 1991)

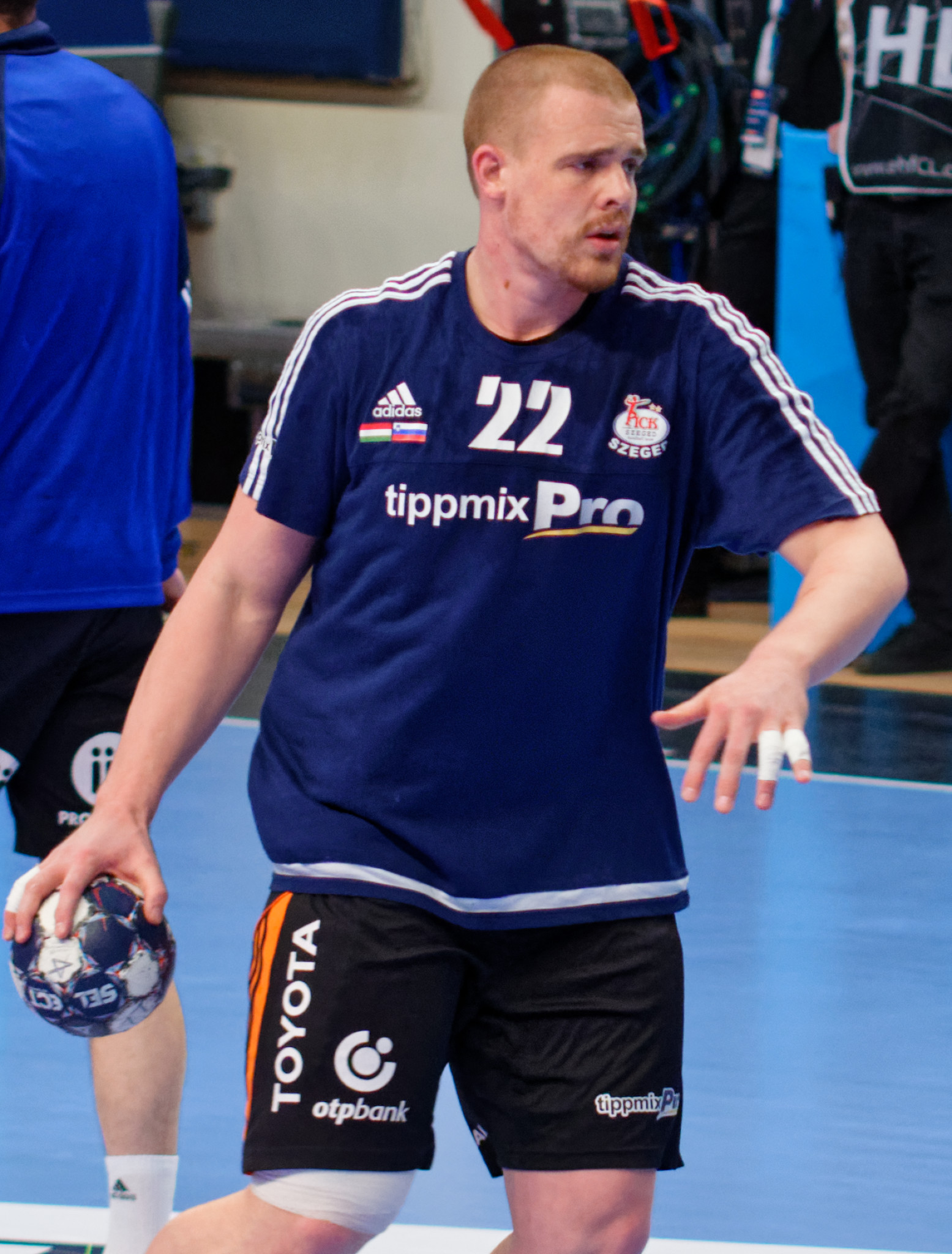
- Gaber in 2017

Personal information
- Nationality: Slovenian
- Born: 22 July 1991 (age 35) Kranj, Slovenia
- Height: 1.97 m (6 ft 6 in)

Sport
- Sport: Handball
- Position: Pivot
- Current club: HBC Nantes
- Number: 15

Senior clubs
- Years: Team
- 2008–2011: RD Loka
- 2011–2013: RK Gorenje Velenje
- 2013–2016: Montpellier Handball
- 2016–2024: SC Pick Szeged
- 2024–: HBC Nantes
National team
Years	Team	Apps	(Gls)
2011–	Slovenia	142	(208)
Medal record
World Championship
Bronze medal – third place	2017 France
- Updated on 4 July 2024

Matej Gaber (born 22 July 1991) is a Slovenian handball player who plays for HBC Nantes and the Slovenia national team.

Gaber represented Slovenia at several international tournaments, including the 2012 European Championship, the 2013 World Championship, the 2015 World Championship, and the 2016 European Championship.
