= Nik Henigman =

Slovenian handball player (born 1995)

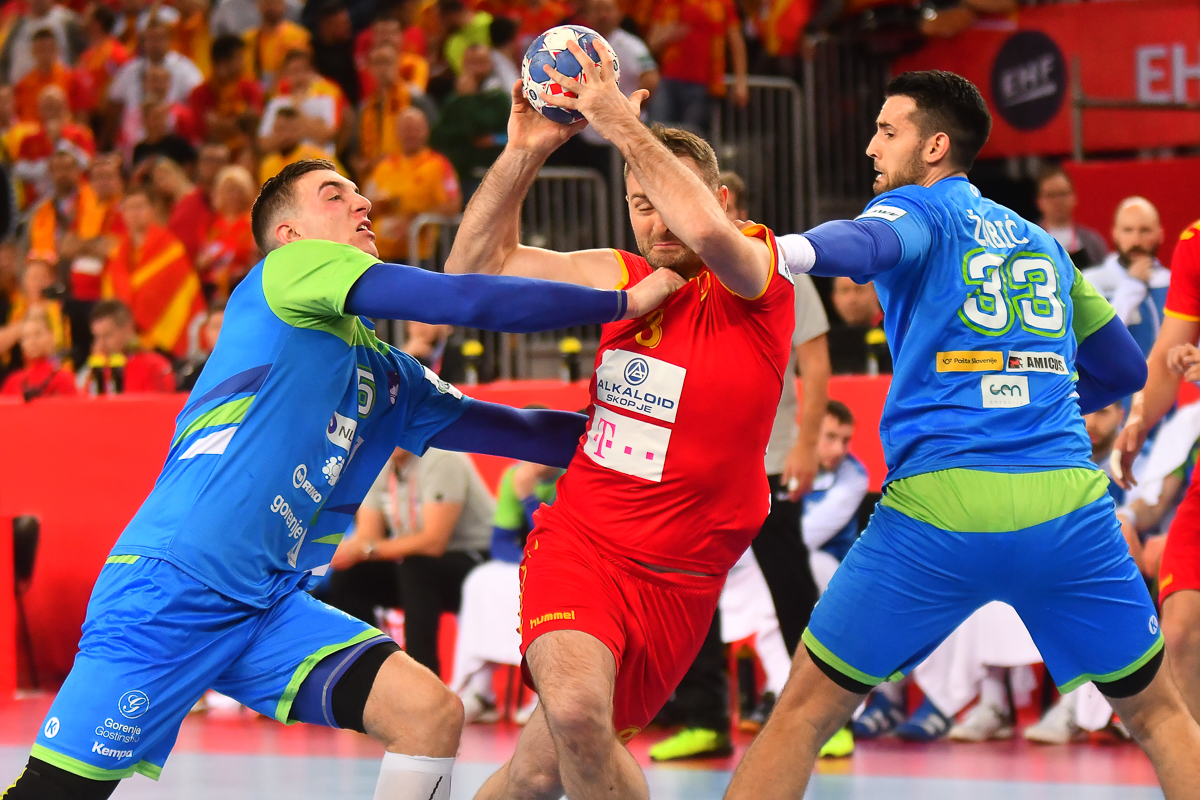

Personal information
- Nationality: Slovenian
- Born: 4 December 1995 (age 30) Ljubljana, Slovenia
- Height: 2.01 m (6 ft 7 in)

Sport
- Sport: Handball
- Position: Left back
- Current club: RK Eurofarm Pelister
- Number: 15

Senior clubs
- Years: Team
- 2012–2018: RD Ribnica
- 2018–2022: SC Pick Szeged
- 2022–2024: Saint-Raphaël VHB
- 2024–2025: C' Chartres MHB
- 2025–: RK Eurofarm Pelister
National team
Years	Team	Apps	(Gls)
2016–	Slovenia	95	(125)
Medal record
World Championship
Bronze medal – third place	2017 France
- Updated on 24 January 2026

Nik Henigman (born 4 December 1995) is a Slovenian handball player who plays for RK Eurofarm Pelister and the Slovenia national team.

With Slovenia, he participated at the Summer Olympics in 2016 and 2024.
