= Dean Bombač =

Slovenian handball player

Personal information
- Nationality: Slovenian
- Born: 4 April 1989 (age 37) Koper, SR Slovenia, Yugoslavia
- Height: 1.90 m (6 ft 3 in)

Sport
- Sport: Handball
- Position: Centre back
- Current club: SC DHfK Leipzig
- Number: 67

Senior clubs
- Years: Team
- 2007–2013: RK Koper
- 2013–2014: HC Dinamo Minsk
- 2014: Pays d'Aix UC
- 2014–2016: SC Pick Szeged
- 2016–2018: PGE Vive Kielce
- 2018–2024: SC Pick Szeged
- 2024–2025: Győri ETO-UNI FKC
- 2025–: SC DHfK Leipzig
National team
Years	Team	Apps	(Gls)
–	Slovenia	139	(299)
- Updated on 31 October 2025

Dean Bombač (born 4 April 1989) is a Slovenian handball player who plays for SC DHfK Leipzig and the Slovenia national team.

He represented Slovenia at the 2024 Summer Olympics.
