= Bence Bánhidi =

Hungarian handball player (born 1995)

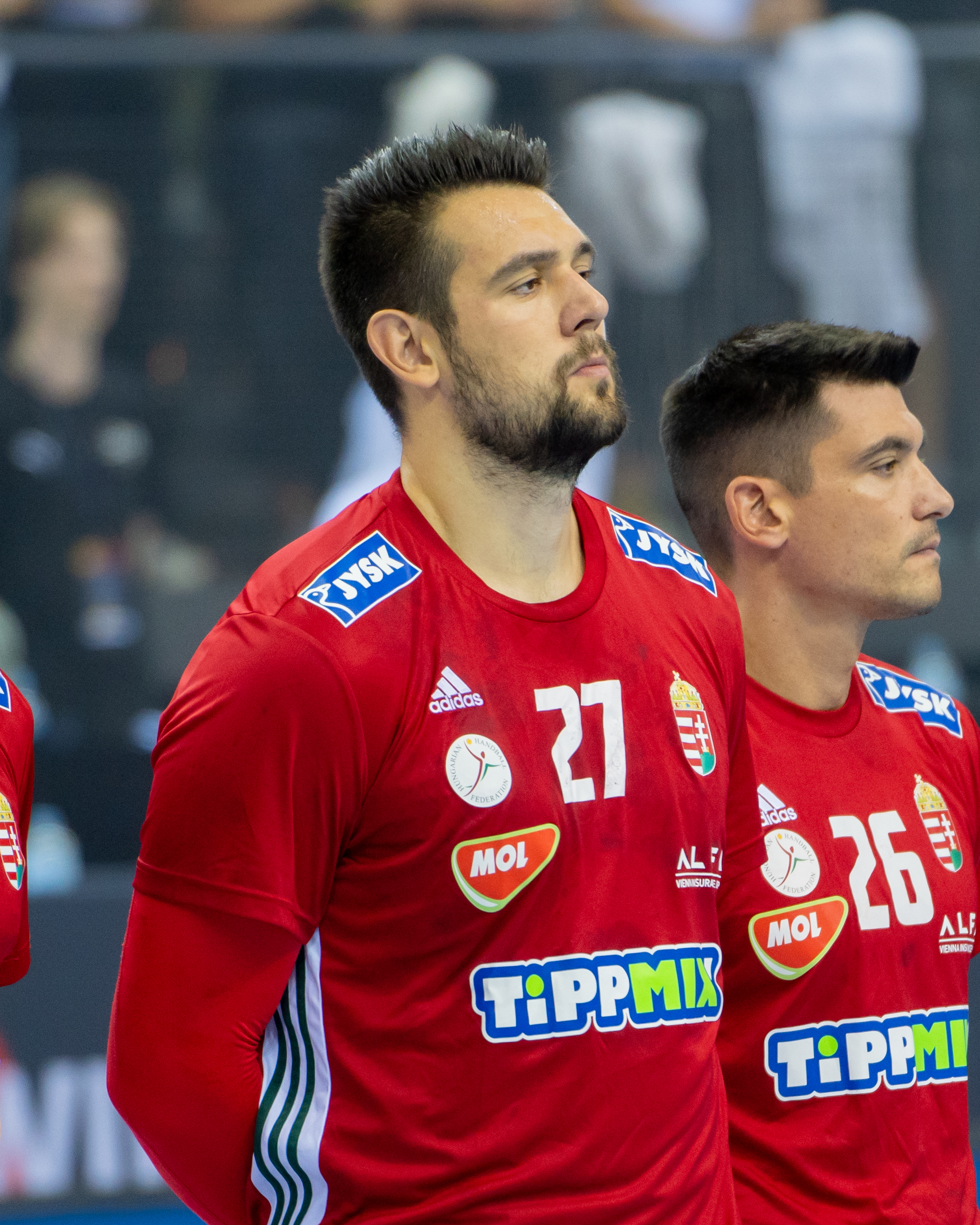

Personal information
- Nationality: Hungarian
- Born: 9 February 1995 (age 31) Győr, Hungary
- Height: 2.07 m (6 ft 9 in)

Sport
- Sport: Handball
- Position: Pivot
- Current club: OTP Bank-Pick Szeged
- Number: 27

Senior clubs
- Years: Team
- 2012–2016: Balatonfüredi KSE
- 2016–: OTP Bank-Pick Szeged
National team
Years	Team	Apps	(Gls)
2013–	Hungary	130	(403)
- Updated on 17 December 2025

Bence Bánhidi (born 9 February 1995) is a Hungarian handballer for OTP Bank-Pick Szeged and the Hungarian national team.

== Career ==
He played youth handball at ETO-SZESE Győr FKC before joining Balatonfüredi KSE in 2011. In 2012 he made his senior debut for the club. In 2016 he joined SC Pick Szeged.

He debuted for the Hungarian national team on 29 October 2014 against Portugal, where he has since played a central role.

He represented Hungary at the 2019 World Men's Handball Championship.

== Individual awards ==
- Hungarian Junior Handballer of the Year: 2014, 2015
- Hungarian Handballer of the Year: 2019, 2020, 2021
- All-Star Team Best Line Player of the European Championship: 2020
- All-Star Team Best Line Player of the EHF Champions League: 2020
