= List of Nemzeti Bajnokság I clubs (men's handball) =

The following is a list of clubs who have played in the Nemzeti Bajnokság I handball league at any time since its formation in 1951.

== Key ==
=== Coloumns ===
Team	It contains the current, or the last name of the club, or in some cases the most well-known names are given.
Operation	The year of foundation, dissolution and reestablishment.
First season	It displays they year when the club played for the first time in the Nemzeti Bajnokság I
Seasons	The number of seasons played in the Nemzeti Bajnokság I.
Name changes	It shows the name changes of the club. The sponsors of the clubs are not displayed.
Note	It displays the mergers, abbreviations of the clubs.

=== Rows ===
Playing in the 2018–19 Nemzeti Bajnokság I
Playing in lower levels
Dissolved

The chart contains the 2013-14 season, too.

== List of clubs ==
#	Team	City	Seasons		
#	Team	City	List of	First	Number of
1.	Vörös Meteor Egyetértés SK	Budapest	1951, 1953, 1954, 1955, 1956, 1957, 1958, 1959, 1960, 1961, 1962, 1963, 1964, 1965, 1966, 1967, 1968, 1969, 1970, 1971, 1972, 1974	1951	20
2.	Csepel SC	Budapest (Csepel)	1951, 1958, 1960, 1961, 1962, 1963, 1966, 1967, 1968, 1969, 1970, 1971, 1972, 1973, 1975, 1977	1951	16
3.	VL Kistext	Budapest (Kispest)	1951, 1952	1951	2
4.	Tatabánya KC	Tatabánya	1951, 1967, 1969, 1970, 1971, 1972, 1973, 1974, 1975, 1976, 1977, 1978, 1979, 1980, 1981, 1982, 1983, 1984, 1985, 1986, 1987, 1988/89, 1989/90, 1990/91, 1991/92, 1993/94, 1994/95, 1995/96, 1995/96, 1996/97, 1998/99, 2002/03, 2003/04, 2004/05, 2005/06, 2006/07, 2007/08, 2008/09, 2009/10, 2010/11, 2011/12, 2012/13, 2013/14, 2014/15, 2015/16, 2016/17, 2017/18, 2018/19	1951	49
5.	Budapest Honvéd SE	Budapest (Kispest)	1952, 1959, 1960, 1961, 1962, 1963, 1964, 1965, 1966, 1967, 1968, 1969, 1970, 1971, 1972, 1973, 1974, 1975, 1976, 1977, 1978, 1979, 1980, 1981, 1982, 1983, 1984, 1985, 1986, 1987, 1988/89	1952	31
6.	Újpesti TE	Budapest (Újpest)	1952, 1953, 1954, 1955, 1957, 1958, 1959, 1960, 1961, 1962, 1963, 1964, 1965, 1966, 1967, 1968, 1969, 1970, 1971, 1973, 1974, 1975, 1979, 1980, 1982, 1983, 1985, 1988/89	1952	28
7.	Diósgyőri VTK	Miskolc	1952, 1953, 1954, 1957, 1958, 1959, 1960, 1962, 1966	1952	9
8.	Testnevelési Egyetem	Budapest	1953, 1954, 1957, 1958, 1965, 1967, 1968, 1969, 1971	1953	9
9.	Martfűi MSE	Martfű	1953, 1963, 1964, 1965, 1966, 1967	1953	6
10.	Veszprémi Haladás	Veszprém	1953, 1954	1953	2
11.	PLER KC	Budapest (Pestszentlőrinc)	1954, 1957, 1958, 1959, 1960, 1961, 1962, 1963, 1964, 1965, 1966, 1967, 1968, 1969, 1970, 1971, 1972, 1973, 1974, 1975, 1976, 1977, 1978, 1979, 1980, 1981, 1982, 1983, 1984, 1985, 1986, 1987, 1988/89, 1989/90, 1990/91, 1991/92, 1992/93, 1993/94, 1994/95, 1995/96, 1996/97, 1997/98, 1998/99, 1999/00, 2000/01, 2001/02, 2002/03, 2003/04, 2004/05, 2005/06, 2006/07, 2007/08, 2008/09, 2009/10, 2010/11, 2013/14, 2014/15, 2015/16	1954	58
12.	VL Lőrinci Fonó	Budapest (Pestszentlőrinc)	1954	1954	1
13.	Győri Textiles SE	Győr	1954, 1960, 1964, 1965, 1966, 1967, 1968, 1969, 1970	1954	9
14.	Hargita KC	Budapest	1954, 1955, 1956, 1957, 1958, 1959, 1991/92, 2004/05, 2005/06	1954	9
15.	Ferencvárosi TC	Budapest (Ferencváros)	1954, 1955, 1956, 1957, 1958, 1959, 1960, 1961, 1962, 1963, 1964, 1965, 1966, 1971, 1972, 1973, 1974, 1975, 1976, 1977, 1978, 1979, 1980, 1981, 1982, 1983, 1984, 1985, 1986, 1987, 1988/89, 1989/90, 2009/10, 2010/11, 2011/12, 2012/13, 2017/18, 2018/19	1954	38
16.	Debreceni VSC	Debrecen	1954, 1956, 1957, 1958	1954	4
17.	Budapesti Kábel	Budapest	1954, 1957, 1958, 1959	1954	4
18.	Budapesti EAC	Budapest	1957, 1958, 1959, 1960, 1961	1957	5
19.	Budapesti Illatszer	Budapest	1957	1957	1
20.	Pécsi KK	Pécs	1957, 1965, 1968, 1973, 1974, 1975, 1976, 1978, 1979, 1980, 1981, 1983, 1984, 1985, 1986, 1987, 1988/89, 1989/90, 1990/91, 1991/92, 1992/93, 1993/94, 1994/95, 1995/96, 1996/97, 1997/98, 1998/99, 1999/00, 2000/01, 2001/02, 2002/03, 2003/04, 2010/11, 2011/12, 2012/13,	1957	35
21.	Budapesti Spartacus SC	Budapest	1958, 1959, 1960, 1961, 1962, 1963, 1964, 1965, 1966, 1967, 1968, 1969, 1970, 1971, 1972, 1973, 1974, 1975, 1976, 1977, 1978, 1979, 1980, 1981, 1982, 1983	1958	26
22.	Miskolci VSC	Miskolc	1958, 1959	1958	2
23.	Komlói Bányász SK	Komló	1958, 1990/91, 1991/92, 1992/93, 1993/94, 1994/95, 1996/97, 1997/98, 1998/99, 2000/01, 2001/02, 2002/03, 2005/06, 2006/07, 2007/08, 2008/09, 2014/15, 2015/16, 2016/17, 2017/18, 2018/19	1958	21
24.	Győri ETO FKC	Győr	1959, 1960, 1961, 1962, 1963, 1964, 1966, 1967, 1968, 1969, 1970, 1971, 1972, 1973, 1974, 1975, 1976, 1977, 1978, 1979, 980, 1981, 1982, 1983, 1984, 1985, 1986, 1987, 1988/89, 1989/90, 1990/91, 1991/92, 1992/93, 1993/94, 1994/95, 1995/96, 1996/97, 1997/98, 1998/99, 1999/00, 2000/01, 2001/02, 2002/03, 2003/04, 2004/05, 2005/06, 2006/07, 2007/08, 2008/09	1959	49
25.	Telefongyár SE	Budapest	1959, 1962	1959	2
26.	Vasas SC	Budapest (Angyalföld)	1960, 1961, 1962, 1963, 1964, 1965, 1968, 1969, 1970, 1971, 1972, 1973, 1974, 1975, 1976, 1977, 1978, 1979, 1980	1960	19
27.	Debreceni Dózsa SE	Debrecen	1961, 1962, 1963, 1967, 1969, 1970, 1971, 1972, 1973, 1974, 1975, 1976, 1977, 1978, 1979, 1980, 1981, 1982, 1983, 1984, 1985, 1986, 1987, 1988/89, 1989/90, 1990/91, 1991/92, 1992/93, 1993/94, 1994/95, 1995/96, 1996/97, 1997/98	1961	33
28.	Férfiruha SK	Budapest	1961	1961	1
29.	Pécsi Bányász SE	Pécs	1963, 1964, 1965, 1966, 1967, 1968, 1969, 1970, 1971, 1972	1963	10
30.	Ózdi KC	Ózd	1964, 1965, 1966, 1967, 1968, 1969, 1972, 1973, 1974, 1975, 1980, 1981, 1982, 1983, 1984, 1985, 1987, 1991/92, 1992/93, 1993/94, 1994/95, 1996/97, 1997/98, 1998/99, 1999/00	1964	25
31.	Csömör KSK	Csömör	1965, 1966, 1968, 1973, 1975, 2001/02, 2003/04, 2004/05, 2005/06	1965	9
32.	Honvéd Szondi SE	Székesfehérvár	1970, 1971, 1972, 1973, 1974, 1975, 1976, 1977, 1978, 1996/97	1970	10
33.	Honvéd Budai SE	Budapest	1970	1970	1
34.	Dunakeszi VSE	Dunakeszi	1974, 1979	1974	2
35.	SC Pick Szeged	Szeged	1976, 1977, 1978, 1979, 1980, 1981, 1982, 1983, 1984, 1985, 1986, 1987, 1988/89, 1989/90, 1990/91, 1991/92, 1992/93, 1993/94, 1994/95, 1995/96, 1996/97, 1997/98, 1998/99, 1999/00, 2000/01, 2001/02, 2002/03, 2003/04, 2004/05, 2005/06, 2006/07, 2007/08, 2008/09, 2009/10, 2010/11, 2011/12, 2012/13, 2013/14, 2014/15, 2015/16, 2016/17, 2017/18, 2018/19	1976	43
36.	Szfehérvári MÁV Előre	Székesfehérvár	1976	1976	1
37.	Békéscsabai Előre KC	Békéscsaba	1977, 1985, 1986, 1987, 1988/89, 1989/90, 1990/91, 1991/92, 1992/93, 1993/94	1977	10
38.	Szilasmenti Tsz SK	Kerepes	1978	1978	1
39.	Veszprém KC	Veszprém	1981, 1982, 1983, 1984, 1985, 1986, 1987, 1988/89, 1989/90, 1990/91, 1991/92, 1992/93, 1993/94, 1994/95, 1995/96, 1996/97, 1997/98, 1998/99, 1999/00, 2000/01, 2001/02, 2002/03, 2003/04, 2004/05, 2005/06, 2006/07, 2007/08, 2008/09, 2009/10, 2010/11, 2011/12, 2012/13, 2013/14, 2014/15, 2015/16, 2016/17, 2017/18, 2018/19	1981	38
40.	Dunaferr SE	Dunaújváros	1981, 1984, 1986, 1988/89, 1990/91, 1990/91, 1991/92, 1992/93, 1993/94, 1995/96, 1996/97, 1997/98, 1998/99, 1999/00, 2000/01, 2001/02, 2002/03, 2003/04, 2004/05, 2005/06, 2006/07, 2007/08, 2008/09, 2009/10, 2010/11	1981	25
41.	Várpalotai Bányász SK	Várpalota	1982, 1983, 1984, 1985, 1986, 1987, 1988/89, 1989/90, 1990/91, 1991/92, 1992/93	1982	11
42.	SZEOL-Délép SE	Szeged	1983, 1984, 1985, 1986	1983	4
43.	Hódiköt SE	Hódmezővásárhely	1984, 1986, 1987	1984	3
44.	PEMÜ SE	Solymár	1987, 1988/89, 1989/90, 1990/91, 1991/92, 1992/93, 1993/94, 1994/95, 1995/96	1987	9
45.	Szolnok KK	Szolnok	1989/90, 1990/91, 1991/92, 1992/93, 1993/94, 1994/95, 1995/96, 1996/97, 1997/98, 1998/99	1989/90	10
46.	III. Kerületi TVE	Budapest (Óbuda)	1989/90	1989/90	1
47.	Nyíregyházi KC	Nyíregyháza	1990/91, 1991/92, 1992/93, 1993/94, 1994/95, 1995/96, 1996/97, 1997/98, 1998/99, 1999/00, 2000/01, 2003/04, 2004/05, 2005/06, 2006/07, 2007/08	1990/91	16
48.	Nagykanizsai Izzó SE	Nagykanizsa	1992/93, 1993/94, 1994/95, 1995/96, 1996/97	1992/93	5
49.	Ceglédi KKSE	Cegléd	1992/93, 1997/98, 1998/99, 1999/00, 2000/01, 2001/02, 2002/03, 2012/13, 2013/14, 2014/15, 2015/16, 2016/17, 2017/18, 2018/19	1992/93	14
50.	Hort SE	Hort	1993/94, 1994/95, 1995/96, 2007/08	1993/94	4
51.	Százhalombattai KE	Százhalombatta	1994/95, 1997/98, 1998/99, 1999/00, 2000/01, 2001/02, 2002/03, 2003/04, 2004/05, 2006/07, 2007/08, 2008/09	1994/95	12
52.	Törökszentmiklósi SE	Törökszentmiklós	1994/95	1994/95	1
53.	Alkaloida SE	Tiszavasvári	1997/98	1997/98	1
54.	Kiskőrös KKC	Kiskőrös	1998/99, 1999/00, 2000/01	1998/99	3
55.	Malév SC	Budapest (Pestszentlőrinc)	1999/00	1999/00	1
56.	Tiszaföldvári VSE	Tiszaföldvár	2000/01	2000/01	1
57.	Orosházi FKSE	Orosháza	2001/02, 2002/03, 2010/11, 2011/12, 2012/13, 2013/14, 2014/15, 2015/16, 2016/17, 2017/18	2001/02	10
58.	Rév TSC	Budapest (Kőbánya)	2001/02	2001/02	1
59.	Békési FKC	Békés	2002/03, 2003/04, 2005/06, 2006/07, 2007/08	2002/03	5
60.	Szigetvári SE	Szigetvár	2003/04, 2004/05	2003/04	2
61.	Debreceni KSE	Debrecen	2004/05, 2005/06, 2006/07, 2007/08, 2008/09, 2009/10	2004/05	6
62.	Gyöngyösi KK	Gyöngyös	2006/07, 2007/08, 2008/09, 2009/10, 2011/12, 2012/13, 2013/14, 2014/15, 2015/16, 2016/17, 2017/18, 2018/19	2006/07	12
63.	Balatonfüredi KSE	Balatonfüred	2007/08, 2008/09, 2009/10, 2010/11, 2011/12, 2012/13, 2013/14, 2014/15, 2015/16, 2016/17, 2017/18, 2018/19	2007/08	12
64.	Mezőkövesdi KC	Mezőkövesd	2007/08, 2008/09, 2009/10, 2010/11, 2011/12, 2013/14, 2014/15, 2015/16, 2016/17, 2018/19	2007/08	10
65.	Tatai AC	Tata	2007/08, 2011/12	2007/08	2
66.	Csurgói KK	Csurgó	2008/09, 2009/10, 2010/11, 2011/12, 2012/13, 2013/14, 2014/15, 2015/16, 2016/17, 2017/18, 2018/19	2008/09	11
67.	Kecskeméti KSE	Kecskemét	2008/09, 2009/10, 2010/11, 2011/12, 2012/13	2008/09	5
68.	Váci KSE	Vác	2012/13, 2013/14, 2015/16, 2016/17, 2017/18,	2012/13	5
69.	ETO-SZESE	Győr	2012/13, 2013/14	2012/13	2
70.	Balmazújvárosi KK	Balmazújváros	2014/15, 2015/16, 2016/17	2014/15	3
71.	DVTK-Eger	Eger	2015/16, 2016/17, 2017/18, 2018/19	2015/16	4
72.	Budakalász FKC	Budakalász	2016/17, 2017/18, 2018/19	2016/17	3
73.	Dabas VSE KC	Dabas	2017/18, 2018/19	2017/18	2
74.	Vecsés SE	Vecsés	2018/19	2018/19	1

== Most seasons ==
The following clubs, 74 in total, have participated in the Hungarian League since its inception in 1951 until the 2018–19 season.

As of 11 April 2019.

- **58** seasons: PLER
- **49** seasons: Győri ETO, **Tatabánya**
- **43** seasons: **Szeged**
- **38** seasons: **Ferencváros**, **Veszprém**
- **35** seasons: Pécs
- **33** seasons: Debreceni Dózsa
- **31** seasons: Budapest Honvéd
- **28** seasons: Újpest
- **26** seasons: Budapesti Spartacus
- **25** seasons: Dunaferr, Ózd
- **21** seasons: **Komlói Bányász**
- **20** seasons: VM Egyetértés
- **19** seasons: Vasas
- **16** seasons: Csepel, Nyíregyháza
- **14** seasons: **Cegléd**
- **12** seasons: **Balatonfüred**, **Gyöngyös**, Százhalombatta
- **11** seasons: **Csurgó**, Várpalotai Bányász
- **10** seasons: Békéscsabai Előre, Honvéd Szondi SE, **Mezőkövesd**, Orosháza, Pécsi Bányász, Szolnok
- **9** seasons: Diósgyőr, Csömör, Hargita, Győri Textiles, PEMÜ, Testnevelési Egyetem
- **6** seasons: Debreceni KSE, Martfű
- **5** seasons: Békés, Budapesti EAC, Kecskemét, Nagykanizsai Izzó, Vác
- **4** seasons: Budapesti Kábel, Debreceni VSC, **DVTK-Eger**, Hort, SZEOL-Délép^{1}
- **3** seasons: Balmazújváros, **Budakalász**, Hódiköt, Kiskőrös
- **2** seasons: ETO-SZESE, **Dabas**, Dunakeszi Vasutas, VL Kistext, Miskolci VSC, Szigetvár, Tatai AC, Telefongyár, Veszprémi Haladás
- **1** seasons: III. Kerületi TVE, Alkaloida, Budapesti Illatszer, Férfiruha SK, Honvéd Budai SE, VL Lőrinci Fonó, Malév SC, Rév TSC, Székesfehérvári MÁV Előre, Szilasmenti Tsz, Tiszaföldvári VSE, Törökszentmiklósi SE, **Vecsés**

As of 11 April 2019

Notes
The teams in bold are competing in the 2018–19 season of the Hungarian League.
^{1} Délép SC in the 1985 season after the merger with SZEOL SC played as SZEOL-Délép SE.

== By city ==
Correct as of 5 June 2016.

#	City	No.	Clubs
1.	Budapest	20	PLER KC, Ferencvárosi TC, Bp. Honvéd SE, Újpesti TE, Bp. Spartacus SC, VM Egyetértés, Vasas SC, Csepel SC, Hargita KC, Testnevelési Egyetem, Budapesti EAC, Bp. Kábel, VL Kistext, Telefongyár, III. Kerületi TVE, Bp. Illatszer, Férfiruha SK, Honvéd Budai SE, VL Lőrinci Fonó, Malév SC, Rév TSC
2.	Debrecen	3	Debreceni VSC, Debreceni Dózsa SE, Debreceni KSE
2.	Győr	3	Győri Textiles SE, Győri ETO FKC, ETO-SZESE
4.	Miskolc	2	Diósgyőri VTK, Miskolci VSC
4.	Pécs	2	Pécsi KK, Pécsi Bányász SE
4.	Szeged	2	SC Pick Szeged, SZEOL-Délép SE
4.	Székesfehérvár	2	Honvéd Szondi SE, Székesfehérvári MÁV Előre SC
4.	Veszprém	2	Veszprémi Haladás, Veszprém KC
9.	Balatonfüred	1	Balatonfüredi KSE
9.	Balmazújváros	1	Balmazújvárosi KK
9.	Békés	1	Békési FKC
9.	Békéscsaba	1	Békéscsabai Előre KC
9.	Budakalász	1	Budakalász FKC
9.	Cegléd	1	Ceglédi KKSE
9.	Csömör	1	Csömör KSK
9.	Csurgó	1	Csurgói KK
9.	Dabas	1	Dabas VSE KC
9.	Dunakeszi	1	Dunakeszi Vasutas SE
9.	Dunaújváros	1	Dunaferr SE
9.	Eger	1	DVTK-Eger
9.	Gyöngyös	1	Gyöngyösi KK
9.	Hort	1	Hort SE
9.	Hódmezővásárhely	1	Hódiköt SE
9.	Kecskemét	1	Kecskeméti KSE
9.	Kerepes	1	Szilasmenti Tsz SK
9.	Kiskőrös	1	Kiskőrös KKC
9.	Komló	1	Komlói Bányász SK
9.	Martfű	1	Martfűi MSE
9.	Mezőkövesd	1	Mezőkövesdi KC
9.	Nagykanizsa	1	Nagykanizsai Izzó SE
9.	Nyíregyháza	1	Nyíregyházi KC
9.	Orosháza	1	Orosházi FKSE
9.	Ózd	1	Ózdi KC
9.	Solymár	1	PEMÜ SE
9.	Százhalombatta	1	Százhalombattai KE
9.	Szigetvár	1	Szigetvári SE
9.	Szolnok	1	Szolnok KK
9.	Tata	1	Tatai AC
9.	Tatabánya	1	Tatabánya KC
9.	Tiszaföldvár	1	Tiszaföldvári VSE
9.	Tiszavasvári	1	Alkaloida SE
9.	Törökszentmiklós	1	Törökszentmiklósi SE
9.	Vác	1	Váci KSE
9.	Várpalota	1	Várpalotai Bányász SK
9.	Vecsés	1	Vecsés SE

== See also ==
- Nemzeti Bajnokság I
- The bolded teams are currently playing in the 2014-15 season of the Hungarian League.
- **R** = Relegated from the NB I
- **D** = Dissolved
- List of Nemzeti Bajnokság I clubs (football)
- List of Országos Bajnokság I (men's water polo) clubs
