= Roland Mikler =

Hungarian handball player (born 1984)

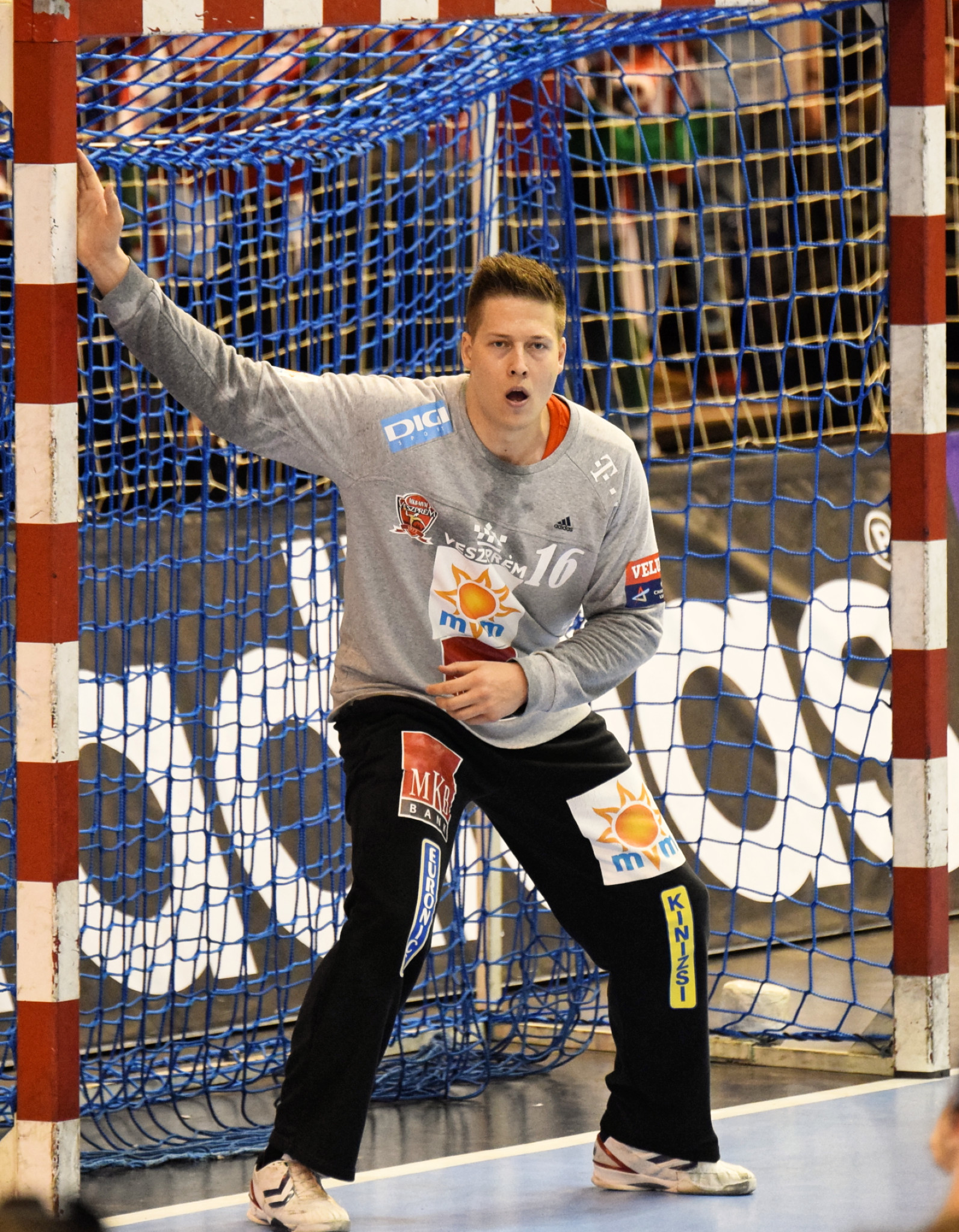

Personal information
- Nationality: Hungarian
- Born: 20 September 1984 (age 42) Dunaújváros, Hungary
- Height: 1.90 m (6 ft 3 in)

Sport
- Sport: Handball
- Position: Goalkeeper
- Current club: OTP Bank-Pick Szeged
- Number: 16

Youth career
- Years: Team
- 1995–2002: Dunaferr SE

Senior clubs
- Years: Team
- 2002–2010: Dunaferr SE
- 2004–2005: → Kalocsai KC (loan)
- 2010–2014: SC Pick Szeged
- 2014–2019: Telekom Veszprém
- 2019–: OTP Bank-Pick Szeged
National team
Years	Team	Apps	(Gls)
2004–	Hungary	252	(2)
Medal record
Junior World Championship
Bronze medal – third place	2005 Hungary
- Updated on 14 January 2026

Roland Mikler (born 20 September 1984) is a Hungarian handball player for OTP Bank-Pick Szeged and the Hungarian national team.

== Honours ==
=== National team ===
- Junior World Championship:
  - Bronze: 2005

=== Club ===
Dunaferr SE

- Nemzeti Bajnokság I
  - Bronze: 2002, 2003, 2004, 2005, 2006, 2007, 2008, 2009
- Magyar Kupa
  - Silver: 2007
  - Bronze: 2002, 2005, 2008

Pick Szeged

- EHF Cup
  - Gold: 2014
- Nemzeti Bajnokság I
  - Gold: 2021, 2022
  - Silver: 2011, 2012, 2013, 2014
- Magyar Kupa
  - Gold: 2025,
  - Silver: 2012, 2013, 2014, 2021
  - Bronze: 2022

Telekom Veszprém

- EHF Champions League
  - Silver: 2015, 2016, 2019
  - Bronze: 2017
- SEHA League
  - Gold: 2015, 2016
  - Silver: 2017
- Nemzeti Bajnokság I
  - Gold: 2015, 2016, 2017, 2019
  - Silver: 2018
- Magyar Kupa
  - Gold: 2015, 2016, 2017, 2018
  - Silver: 2019

=== Individual ===
- All-Star Goalkeeper of the Junior World Championship: 2005
- Hungarian Goalkeeper of the Year: 2011, 2013, 2014, 2015, 2016, 2017, 2019
- Hungarian Handballer of the Year: 2014
- All-Star Goalkeeper of the EHF Champions League: 2015
