= Nemzeti Bajnokság I top scorers (men's handball) =

The following list shows the Nemzeti Bajnokság I top scorers season by season.

Season	Player	Club	Goals
1959	(Hungary) János Pfeiffer	Budapest Spartacus SC	
1960	(Hungary) Jenő Vad	Újpesti Dózsa	
1962	(Hungary) László Stiller	Budapest Spartacus SC	
1963	(Hungary) András Kesjár	Martfű	
1964	(Hungary) Ferenc Sudár	Pécsi Bányász	
1965	(Hungary) András Fenyő	Budapest Honvéd SE	
1966	(Hungary) Ádám Koch	Budapest Vörös Meteor	
1967	(Hungary) Sándor Kaló	Tatabányai Bányász	160
1968	(Hungary) István Marosi	Ózdi Kohász	
1969	(Hungary) Sándor Kaló (Hungary) Sándor Vass	Tatabányai Bányász; Elektromos SE	185
1970	(Hungary) Ernő Gubányi	Budapest Vörös Meteor	
1971	(Hungary) Ferenc Leirer	Csepel SC	
1972	(Hungary) István Varga	Budapest Honvéd SE	
1973	(Hungary) István Mészáros	Újpesti Dózsa	
1974	(Hungary) István Varga	Debreceni Dózsa SE	
1975	(Hungary) István Varga	Debreceni Dózsa SE	
1976	(Hungary) István Varga	Debreceni Dózsa SE	
1977	(Hungary) Péter Kovács	Budapest Honvéd SE	
1978	(Hungary) István Varga	Debreceni Dózsa SE	
1979	(Hungary) István Varga	Debreceni Dózsa SE	
1980	(Hungary) Zsolt Kontra	Tatabányai Bányász	
1981	(Hungary) Péter Kovács	Budapest Honvéd SE	
1982	(Hungary) Péter Kovács	Budapest Honvéd SE	
1983	(Hungary) Péter Kovács	Budapest Honvéd SE	
1984	(Hungary) László Marosi	Tatabányai Bányász	
1985	(Hungary) László Marosi	Tatabányai Bányász	
1986	(Hungary) László Marosi	Tatabányai Bányász	
1987	(Hungary) László Marosi	Tatabányai Bányász	
1988–89	(Hungary) László Marosi	Tatabányai Bányász	
1989–90	(Hungary) László Marosi	Tatabányai Bányász	
1990–91	(Hungary) János Wágenbach	Dunaferr SE	
1991–92	(Hungary) Zoltán Keszthelyi	Komlói BSK	
1992–93	(Hungary) Árpád Mohácsi	Békéscsabai Előre	107
1993–94	(Moldova) Serghei Krasnii	Ózdi KC	
1994–95	(Hungary) László Béres	Pemű SE	
1995–96	(Hungary) Kálmán Fenyő	Dunaferr SE	
1996–97	(Hungary) Attila Németh	Pécsi MKC	
1997–98	(Hungary) József Éles	Fotex KCV	
1998–99	(Hungary) Csaba Bendó	MOL Szolnok KK	
1999–2000	(Hungary) Árpád Mohácsi	Dunaferr SE	
2000–01	(Hungary) Árpád Mohácsi	Dunaferr SE	
2001–02	(Hungary) János Frey	Győri ETO KC	
2002–03	(Cuba) José Savon	Pestszentlőrinc-Elektromos	
2003–04	(Hungary) János Moldován	Békési FKC	
2004–05	(Cuba) José Savon	Honvéd-Hargita KC	
2005–06	(Serbia) Marko Vujin	Dunaferr SE	
2006–07	(Hungary) Gábor Oláh	Erste-Békési FKC	
2007–08	(Hungary) Gábor Oláh	Erste-Békési FKC	
2008–09	(Slovakia) Marián Kleis	Gyöngyösi KK	219
2009–10	(Hungary) Kornél Nagy	Dunaferr SE	188
2010–11	(Bosnia and Herzegovina) Marinko Kelečević	Celebi-FTC	186
2011–12	(Serbia) Marko Vujin	MKB Veszprém	176
2012–13	(Hungary) Ákos Lele	Grundfos-Tatabánya	160
2013–14	(Sweden) Jonas Larholm	SC Pick Szeged	133
2014–15	(Japan) Atsushi Mekaru	Balmazújvárosi KK	120
2015–16	(Hungary) Bence Nagy	Gyöngyösi KK	186
2016–17	(Hungary) Mátyás Győri	Balatonfüredi KSE	158
2017–18	(Serbia) Marko Vasić	Csurgói KK	173
2018–19	(Montenegro) Miloš Vujović	Tatabánya KC	180
2019–20	cancelled	cancelled	-
2020–21	(Montenegro) Ivan Perišić	Budakalász FKC	161
2021–22	(Hungary) Bence Nagy	FTC	171
2022–23	(Hungary) Miklós Rosta	SC Pick Szeged	157
2023–24	(Hungary) Bence Nagy	FTC	144
2024–25	(Hungary) Tamás Kovács	NEKA	144
