= László Marosi =

Hungarian handball player (born 1962)

Personal information
- Full name: László Marosi
- Nationality: Hungarian
- Born: 26 November 1962 (age 63) Kisbér, Hungary
- Height: 1.87 m (6 ft 2 in)

Sport
- Sport: Handball
- Position: Left Back, Left Winger
- Current club: Retired

Youth career
- Years: Team
- –1977: (Hungary) Kisbéri Gimnázium
- 1978–1980: (Hungary) Tatabányai Bányász SC

Senior clubs
- Years: Team
- 1981–1990: (Hungary) Tatabányai Bányász SC
- 1990–1999: (Germany) TBV Lemgo
- 1999–2000: (Hungary) Dunaferr SE
National team
Years	Team	Apps	(Gls)
1983–1992	Hungary	171	(710)
Medal record
World Championship
Silver medal – second place	1986 Switzerland	Team

László Marosi (born 26 November 1962 in Kisbér) is a Hungarian former handball player, currently the president of the Tatabánya KC club. He participated at the 1988 Summer Olympics, where the Hungarian national team placed fourth, and at the 1992 Summer Olympics, where the team placed seventh. He also represented Hungary on two World Championships in 1986 and 1990 and won a silver medal on the first one.

== Career ==
=== Club ===
He was born in Kisbér, located about forty kilometers from Tatabánya, but from an early age he visited Tatabánya with his family, whose handball team represented an increasingly important player in the Hungarian championship in the 1970s, winning the Nemzeti Bajnokság I in 1974. The club celebrated its next league title 4 years later, when the 15-year-old László was already playing handball in the club's reserves. In 1983, in addition to the championship gold medal, he won his first top scorer title in Nemzeti Bajnokság I, which he then defended five times, something that no one else in the league has been able to do since then. In Hungary, he was selected the best of the year twice handball player: in 1987 and 1988. In 1990, he followed Lajos Mocsai to the German TBV Lemgo team, where he stayed for a decade and with whom he won the Handball-Bundesliga (1997), the DHB-Pokal twice (1995, 1997) and the EHF Cup Winner's Cup once (1996). The German he played 260 times in the league, 311 of his 1213 goals were seven-meter goals, he became a legend in TBV Lemgo, and his number 6 jersey was retired. After a decade of legionnaires in Germany, he returned home to Hungary in 1999, and since Tatabánya KC had just been relegated, he transferred to the Dunaferr SE team at the age of 37, with which he immediately won another Hungarian championship, pouring in the goals, for example, finding the back of the opponent's goal 11 times in the match against SC Pick Szeged. In January 2000, an Achilles tendon injury ended his career.

=== National team ===
In 1983, at the age of twenty, he was invited to the Hungary men's national handball team, but due to spinal surgery, he was unable to travel to the Friendship Games in Moscow, which were held instead of the Los Angeles Olympics. László was originally a left back, but was led by Lajos Mocsai he played a lot in the Hungary men's national handball team as a left winger, the original not just anyone played in his position: Péter Kovács. Its key role was in the 1986 World Championship silver medal, Iceland and Romania thanks to his goals scored in the last minute the Hungarian national team won. In 1988, he finished in 4th place at the Seoul Olympics with the national team, and was also elected the tournament's best left back. In the Hungary men's national handball team he made a total of 171 appearances and scored 710 goals.

== Honours ==
=== National team ===
- World Championship:
  - Silver: 1986

=== Club ===
Tatabányai Bányász

- Nemzeti Bajnokság I
  - Gold: 1984
  - Silver: 1982
  - Bronze: 1981
- Magyar Kupa
  - Silver: 1981, 1983 jan., 1984, 1988-89
  - Bronze: 1982

TBV Lemgo

- Handball-Bundesliga
  - Gold: 1997
- DHB-Pokal
  - Gold: 1995, 1997
- DHB-Supercup
  - Gold: 1997
- EHF Cup Winners' Cup
  - Gold: 1996

Dunaferr SE

- Nemzeti Bajnokság I
  - Gold: 2000
- EHF Cup Winners' Cup
  - Silver: 2000

=== Individual ===
- Hungarian Handballer of the Year: 1987, 1988
- Nemzeti Bajnokság I Top Scorer: 1984, 1985, 1986, 1987, 1989, 1990
- Best left back of the 1988 Olympic Games
