= 2007–08 Nemzeti Bajnokság I (men's handball) =

Nemzeti Bajnokság I
- Season: 2007–08
- Country: Hungary
- Champions: MKB Veszprém
- Champions League: MKB Veszprém; Pick Szeged
- EHF Cup: Debreceni KSE; Komlói BSK
- Cup Winners' Cup: PLER KC

2007–08 Nemzeti Bajnokság I (men's handball) season.

== Team information ==
Location of teams in the 2007–08 Nemzeti Bajnokság I

| Team | Location | Arena | Capacity |
|---|---|---|---|
| Békési FKC | Békés | Városi Sportcsarnok | 800 |
| Balatonfüredi KSE | Balatonfüred | Balaton Szabadidő és Konferencia Központ | 712 |
| Debreceni KSE | Debrecen | Hódos Imre Sportcsarnok | 2,000 |
| Dunaferr SE | Dunaújváros | Dunaferr Sportcsarnok | 1,200 |
| Gyöngyösi KK | Gyöngyös | Városi Sportcsarnok | 1,600 |
| Győri ETO FKC | Győr | Magvassy Mihály Sportcsarnok | 2,800 |
| Hort SE | Hort | | |
| Kecskemét SE | Kecskemét | Messzi István Sportcsarnok | 1,200 |
| Komlói BSK | Komló | Sportközpont | 900 |
| Mezőkövesdi KC | Mezőkövesd | Városi Sportcsarnok | 800 |
| Nyíregyházi KSE | Nyíregyháza | Városi Sportcsarnok | 3,500 |
| PLER KC | Budapest | Pestszentimrei Sportkastély | 1,000 |
| Pick Szeged | Szeged | Városi Sportcsarnok | 3,200 |
| Százhalombattai KE | Százhalombatta | Városi Sportcsarnok | 1,200 |
| Tatai Honvéd AC | Tata | | |
| Tatabánya KC | Tatabánya | Földi Imre Sportcsarnok | 1,000 |
| MKB Veszprém | Veszprém | Városi Sportcsarnok | 2,200 |

== Regular season ==
=== Standings (Group A) ===
| | Team | Pld | W | D | L | GF | GA | Diff | Pts |
|---|---|---|---|---|---|---|---|---|---|
| 1 | Pick Szeged | 14 | 13 | 0 | 1 | 490 | 311 | +179 | 26 |
| 2 | Debreceni KSE | 14 | 10 | 1 | 3 | 403 | 355 | +48 | 21 |
| 3 | Százhalombattai KE | 14 | 9 | 1 | 4 | 392 | 351 | +41 | 19 |
| 4 | PLER KC | 14 | 8 | 1 | 5 | 405 | 368 | +37 | 17 |
| 5 | Tatabánya KC | 14 | 7 | 1 | 6 | 384 | 386 | −2 | 15 |
| 6 | Mezőkövesdi KC | 14 | 4 | 0 | 10 | 349 | 411 | −62 | 8 |
| 7 | Hort SE | 14 | 2 | 0 | 12 | 322 | 438 | −116 | 4 |
| 8 | Nyíregyházi KSE | 14 | 1 | 0 | 13 | 297 | 422 | −125 | 2 |

| Champion Playoff |
| Relegation Round |

Pld - Played; W - Won; L - Lost; PF - Points for; PA - Points against; Diff - Difference; Pts - Points.

=== Results (Group A) ===
In the table below the home teams are listed on the left and the away teams along the top.

=== Standings (Group B) ===
| | Team | Pld | W | D | L | GF | GA | Diff | Pts |
|---|---|---|---|---|---|---|---|---|---|
| 1 | MKB Veszprém | 14 | 14 | 0 | 0 | 526 | 312 | +214 | 28 |
| 2 | Dunaferr SE | 14 | 12 | 0 | 2 | 421 | 325 | +96 | 24 |
| 3 | Komlói BSK | 14 | 5 | 4 | 5 | 347 | 376 | −29 | 14 |
| 4 | Békési FKC | 14 | 6 | 1 | 7 | 415 | 442 | −37 | 13 |
| 5 | Gyöngyösi KK | 14 | 4 | 5 | 5 | 343 | 372 | −29 | 13 |
| 6 | Balatonfüredi KSE | 14 | 4 | 3 | 7 | 346 | 380 | −34 | 11 |
| 7 | Győri ETO FKC | 14 | 3 | 3 | 8 | 378 | 420 | −42 | 9 |
| 8 | Tatai Honvéd AC | 14 | 0 | 0 | 14 | 321 | 470 | −149 | 0 |

| Champion Playoff |
| Relegation Round |

Pld - Played; W - Won; L - Lost; PF - Points for; PA - Points against; Diff - Difference; Pts - Points.

=== Results (Group B) ===
In the table below the home teams are listed on the left and the away teams along the top.

== Champion play-off ==
=== Semifinals ===
| Team 1 | Score | Team 2 |
|---|---|---|
| MKB Veszprém | 3 – 0 | PLER KC |

| 28 March 2008; 18:00 | MKB Veszprém | 37 – 28 | PLER KC | Városi Sportcsarnok, Veszprém; Attendance: 1,00; Referees: Kisfalvi, Péli |
| 28 March 2008; 18:00 | Gál 8 | (20–15) | Szabó 5 | Városi Sportcsarnok, Veszprém; Attendance: 1,00; Referees: Kisfalvi, Péli |
| 28 March 2008; 18:00 | 3× (yellow card) 3× (suspension) | Report | 3× (yellow card) 6× (suspension) | Városi Sportcsarnok, Veszprém; Attendance: 1,00; Referees: Kisfalvi, Péli |

| 30 March 2008; 18:00 | PLER KC | 26 – 37 | MKB Veszprém | Elektromos Sportcsarnok, Budapest; Attendance: 700; Referees: Baranyi, Szloska |
| 30 March 2008; 18:00 | Balogh 7 | (14–20) | Vujin 8 | Elektromos Sportcsarnok, Budapest; Attendance: 700; Referees: Baranyi, Szloska |
| 30 March 2008; 18:00 | 3× (yellow card) | Report | 3× (yellow card) 1× (suspension) | Elektromos Sportcsarnok, Budapest; Attendance: 700; Referees: Baranyi, Szloska |

| 8 April 2008; 18:00 | MKB Veszprém | 37 – 23 | PLER KC | Városi Sportcsarnok, Veszprém; Attendance: 1,200; Referees: Szegedi, Unyatinszki |
| 8 April 2008; 18:00 | Vujin 9 | (18–9) | Szabó 7 | Városi Sportcsarnok, Veszprém; Attendance: 1,200; Referees: Szegedi, Unyatinszki |
| 8 April 2008; 18:00 | 3× (yellow card) 1× (suspension) | Report | 2× (yellow card) 7× (suspension) | Városi Sportcsarnok, Veszprém; Attendance: 1,200; Referees: Szegedi, Unyatinszki |

| Team 1 | Score | Team 2 |
|---|---|---|
| Pick Szeged | 3 – 1 | Dunaferr SE |

| 29 March 2008; 17:00 | Pick Szeged | 25 – 20 | Dunaferr SE | Városi Sportcsarnok, Szeged; Attendance: 3,000; Referees: Herczeg, Südi |
| 29 March 2008; 17:00 | Krivokapić 7 | (15–9) | Törő 8 | Városi Sportcsarnok, Szeged; Attendance: 3,000; Referees: Herczeg, Südi |
| 29 March 2008; 17:00 | 4× (yellow card) 3× (suspension) | Report | | Városi Sportcsarnok, Szeged; Attendance: 3,000; Referees: Herczeg, Südi |

| 3 April 2008; 18:00 | Dunaferr SE | 29 – 27 | Pick Szeged | Dunaferr Sportcsarnok, Dunaújváros; Attendance: 1,200; Referees: Bonifert, Oláh |
| 3 April 2008; 18:00 | Törő 9 | (14–16) | Krivokapić 10 | Dunaferr Sportcsarnok, Dunaújváros; Attendance: 1,200; Referees: Bonifert, Oláh |
| 3 April 2008; 18:00 | 3× (yellow card) 9× (suspension) | Report | 3× (yellow card) 2× (suspension) 1× (red card) | Dunaferr Sportcsarnok, Dunaújváros; Attendance: 1,200; Referees: Bonifert, Oláh |

| 9 April 2008; 18:00 | Pick Szeged | 27 – 23 | Dunaferr SE | Városi Sportcsarnok, Szeged; Attendance: 3,000; Referees: Kékes, Kékes |
| 9 April 2008; 18:00 | Krivokapić 12 | (13–14) | Törő 6 | Városi Sportcsarnok, Szeged; Attendance: 3,000; Referees: Kékes, Kékes |
| 9 April 2008; 18:00 | 3× (yellow card) 3× (suspension) | Report | 3× (yellow card) 4× (suspension) | Városi Sportcsarnok, Szeged; Attendance: 3,000; Referees: Kékes, Kékes |

| 13 April 2008; 15:30 | Dunaferr SE | 25 – 28 | Pick Szeged | Dunaferr Sportcsarnok, Dunaújváros; Attendance: 1,200; Referees: Dobrovits, Tájok |
| 13 April 2008; 15:30 | Božović, Törő 6 | (8–16) | Krivokapić 11 | Dunaferr Sportcsarnok, Dunaújváros; Attendance: 1,200; Referees: Dobrovits, Tájok |
| 13 April 2008; 15:30 | 2× (yellow card) 4× (suspension) | Report | 3× (yellow card) 6× (suspension) 1× (red card) | Dunaferr Sportcsarnok, Dunaújváros; Attendance: 1,200; Referees: Dobrovits, Tájok |

=== 3rd Place ===
| Team 1 | Score | Team 2 |
|---|---|---|
| Dunaferr SE | 3 – 0 | PLER KC |

| 25 April 2008; 18:00 | Dunaferr SE | 35 – 27 | PLER KC | Dunaferr Sportcsarnok, Dunaújváros; Attendance: 800; Referees: Herczeg, Südi |
| 25 April 2008; 18:00 | Nagy 9 | (18–16) | Balogh 7 | Dunaferr Sportcsarnok, Dunaújváros; Attendance: 800; Referees: Herczeg, Südi |
| 25 April 2008; 18:00 | 1× (yellow card) 4× (suspension) | Report | 3× (yellow card) 5× (suspension) | Dunaferr Sportcsarnok, Dunaújváros; Attendance: 800; Referees: Herczeg, Südi |

| 1 May 2008; 18:00 | PLER KC | 25 – 33 | Dunaferr SE | Elektromos Sportcsarnok, Budapest; Attendance: 500; Referees: Nagy, Túróczy |
| 1 May 2008; 18:00 | Balogh 7 | (16–18) | Miss 9 | Elektromos Sportcsarnok, Budapest; Attendance: 500; Referees: Nagy, Túróczy |
| 1 May 2008; 18:00 | 3× (yellow card) 5× (suspension) | Report | 3× (yellow card) 4× (suspension) | Elektromos Sportcsarnok, Budapest; Attendance: 500; Referees: Nagy, Túróczy |

| 8 May 2008; 18:00 | Dunaferr SE | 37 – 22 | PLER KC | Dunaferr Sportcsarnok, Dunaújváros; Attendance: 1,000; Referees: Hargitai, Markó |
| 8 May 2008; 18:00 | Grebenár 9 | (17–10) | Szabó 5 | Dunaferr Sportcsarnok, Dunaújváros; Attendance: 1,000; Referees: Hargitai, Markó |
| 8 May 2008; 18:00 | 3× (yellow card) 4× (suspension) | Report | 3× (yellow card) 6× (suspension) | Dunaferr Sportcsarnok, Dunaújváros; Attendance: 1,000; Referees: Hargitai, Markó |

=== Finals ===
| Team 1 | Score | Team 2 |
|---|---|---|
| MKB Veszprém | 3 – 2 | Pick Szeged |

| 26 April 2008; 17:00 | MKB Veszprém | 32 – 24 | Pick Szeged | Városi Sportcsarnok, Veszprém; Attendance: 2,500; Referees: Dobrovits, Tájok |
| 26 April 2008; 17:00 | Vujin 10 | (15–9) | Krivokapić 7 | Városi Sportcsarnok, Veszprém; Attendance: 2,500; Referees: Dobrovits, Tájok |
| 26 April 2008; 17:00 | 2× (yellow card) 5× (suspension) | Report | 2× (yellow card) 5× (suspension) | Városi Sportcsarnok, Veszprém; Attendance: 2,500; Referees: Dobrovits, Tájok |

| 6 May 2008; 18:00 | Pick Szeged | 35 – 30 | MKB Veszprém | Városi Sportcsarnok, Szeged; Attendance: 3,500; Referees: Herczeg, Südi |
| 6 May 2008; 18:00 | Ghionea 10 | (18–13) | Šešum 7 | Városi Sportcsarnok, Szeged; Attendance: 3,500; Referees: Herczeg, Südi |
| 6 May 2008; 18:00 | 2× (yellow card) 4× (suspension) 1× (red card) | Report | 2× (yellow card) 8× (suspension) 1× (red card) | Városi Sportcsarnok, Szeged; Attendance: 3,500; Referees: Herczeg, Südi |

| 17 May 2008; 19:00 | MKB Veszprém | 33 – 26 | Pick Szeged | Városi Sportcsarnok, Veszprém; Attendance: 2,200; Referees: Herczeg, Südi |
| 17 May 2008; 19:00 | Eklemović, Vujin 7 | (17–11) | Žvižej 6 | Városi Sportcsarnok, Veszprém; Attendance: 2,200; Referees: Herczeg, Südi |
| 17 May 2008; 19:00 | 3× (yellow card) 5× (suspension) 1× (red card) | Report | 3× (yellow card) 7× (suspension) 1× (red card) | Városi Sportcsarnok, Veszprém; Attendance: 2,200; Referees: Herczeg, Südi |

| 20 May 2008; 19:00 | Pick Szeged | 33 – 32 | MKB Veszprém | Városi Sportcsarnok, Szeged; Attendance: 5,000; Referees: Dobrovits, Tájok |
| 20 May 2008; 19:00 | Žvižej 12 | (15–14) | Marković 7 | Városi Sportcsarnok, Szeged; Attendance: 5,000; Referees: Dobrovits, Tájok |
| 20 May 2008; 19:00 | 2× (yellow card) 6× (suspension) 2× (red card) | Report | 2× (yellow card) 4× (suspension) | Városi Sportcsarnok, Szeged; Attendance: 5,000; Referees: Dobrovits, Tájok |

| 23 May 2008; 19:00 | MKB Veszprém | 34 – 24 | Pick Szeged | Városi Sportcsarnok, Veszprém; Attendance: 2,200; Referees: Dobrovits, Tájok |
| 23 May 2008; 19:00 | Vujin 10 | (18–14) | Žvižej 12 | Városi Sportcsarnok, Veszprém; Attendance: 2,200; Referees: Dobrovits, Tájok |
| 23 May 2008; 19:00 | 2× (yellow card) 8× (suspension) | Report | 3× (yellow card) 1× (suspension) 1× (red card) | Városi Sportcsarnok, Veszprém; Attendance: 2,200; Referees: Dobrovits, Tájok |

=== Final standings ===
| | Team | Pld | W | D | L | GF | GA | Diff | Pts | Qualification or Relegation |
|---|---|---|---|---|---|---|---|---|---|---|
| 1 | MKB Veszprém | 16 | 13 | 1 | 2 | 534 | 417 | +117 | 27 | 2008–09 EHF Champions League group stage |
| 2 | Pick Szeged | 17 | 10 | 2 | 5 | 482 | 463 | +19 | 22 | 2008–09 EHF Champions League group stage |
| 3 | Dunaferr SE | 15 | 8 | 1 | 6 | 418 | 376 | +42 | 17 | |
| 4 | Debreceni KSE | 12 | 6 | 0 | 6 | 338 | 332 | +6 | 12 | 2008–09 EHF European Cup round 3 |
| 5 | Békési FKC | 13 | 6 | 0 | 7 | 359 | 384 | −25 | 12 | Relegation to the 2008–09 Nemzeti Bajnokság I/B |
| 6 | PLER KC | 14 | 5 | 0 | 9 | 367 | 435 | −78 | 10 | 2008–09 EHF Cup Winners' Cup round 2 |
| 7 | Százhalombattai KE | 13 | 4 | 0 | 9 | 327 | 362 | −35 | 8 | |
| 8 | Komlói BSK | 12 | 2 | 0 | 10 | 306 | 362 | −56 | 4 | 2008–09 EHF European Cup round 3 |

Pld - Played; W - Won; L - Lost; PF - Points for; PA - Points against; Diff - Difference; Pts - Points.

== Relegation round ==
=== Final standings ===
| | Team | Pld | W | D | L | GF | GA | Diff | Pts | Relegation |
|---|---|---|---|---|---|---|---|---|---|---|
| 9 | Balatonfüredi KSE | 14 | 12 | 1 | 1 | 469 | 377 | +92 | 25 | |
| 10 | Tatabánya KC | 14 | 11 | 2 | 1 | 488 | 394 | +94 | 24 | |
| 11 | Gyöngyösi KK | 14 | 10 | 2 | 2 | 452 | 403 | +49 | 22 | |
| 12 | Győri ETO FKC | 14 | 7 | 1 | 6 | 425 | 419 | +6 | 15 | |
| 13 | Mezőkövesdi KC | 14 | 6 | 1 | 7 | 398 | 401 | −3 | 13 | |
| 14 | Tatai Honvéd AC | 14 | 2 | 1 | 11 | 358 | 408 | −50 | 5 | Relegation to the 2008–09 Nemzeti Bajnokság I/B |
| 15 | Hort SE | 14 | 1 | 2 | 11 | 346 | 430 | −84 | 4 | Relegation to the 2008–09 Nemzeti Bajnokság I/B |
| 16 | Nyíregyházi KSE | 14 | 2 | 0 | 12 | 353 | 457 | −104 | 4 | Relegation to the 2008–09 Nemzeti Bajnokság I/B |

Pld - Played; W - Won; L - Lost; PF - Points for; PA - Points against; Diff - Difference; Pts - Points.
