= 2008–09 Nemzeti Bajnokság I (men's handball) =

Nemzeti Bajnokság I
- Season: 2008–09
- Country: Hungary
- Champions: MKB Veszprém
- Champions League: MKB Veszprém; Pick Szeged
- EHF Cup: Dunaferr SE; PLER KC
- Cup Winners' Cup: Ferencváros

2008–09 Nemzeti Bajnokság I (men's handball) season.

== Team information ==
Location of teams in the 2008–09 Nemzeti Bajnokság I

Team	Location	Arena	Capacity
Balatonfüredi KSE	Balatonfüred	Balaton Szabadidő és Konferencia Központ	712
Csurgói KK	Csurgó	Városi Sportcsarnok	800
Debreceni KSE	Debrecen	Hódos Imre Sportcsarnok	2,000
Dunaferr SE	Dunaújváros	Dunaferr Sportcsarnok	1,200
Gyöngyösi KK	Gyöngyös	Városi Sportcsarnok	1,600
Győri ETO FKC	Győr	Magvassy Mihály Sportcsarnok	2,800
Kecskemét SE	Kecskemét	Messzi István Sportcsarnok	1,200
Komlói BSK	Komló	Sportközpont	900
Mezőkövesdi KC	Mezőkövesd	Városi Sportcsarnok	800
PLER KC	Budapest	Pestszentimrei Sportkastély	1,000
Pick Szeged	Szeged	Városi Sportcsarnok	3,200
Százhalombattai KE	Százhalombatta	Városi Sportcsarnok	1,200
Tatabánya KC	Tatabánya	Földi Imre Sportcsarnok	1,000
MKB Veszprém	Veszprém	Veszprém Aréna	5,096

== Regular season ==
=== Standings ===
	Team	Pld	W	D	L	GF	GA	Diff	Pts
1	MKB Veszprém	26	26	0	0	951	630	+321	52
2	Pick Szeged	26	24	0	2	800	624	+176	48
3	Dunaferr SE	26	19	0	7	773	653	+120	38
4	PLER KC	26	16	1	9	720	674	+56	33
5	Balatonfüredi KSE	26	14	3	9	692	689	+3	31
6	Tatabánya KC	26	12	3	11	749	758	−9	27
7	Debreceni KSE	26	11	4	11	732	739	−7	26
8	Mezőkövesdi KC	26	10	3	13	713	759	−46	23
9	Gyöngyösi KK	26	7	4	15	744	805	−61	18
10	Kecskemét SE	26	7	4	15	697	771	−74	18
11	Csurgói KK	26	6	4	16	688	751	−63	16
12	Százhalombattai KE	26	6	4	16	652	779	−127	16
13	Győri ETO FKC	26	3	4	19	623	769	−146	10
14	Komlói BSK	26	3	2	21	671	804	−133	8

Champion Playoff
5 to 8 Playoff
Relegation Round
Relegation

Pld - Played; W - Won; L - Lost; PF - Points for; PA - Points against; Diff - Difference; Pts - Points.

=== Results ===
In the table below the home teams are listed on the left and the away teams along the top.

== Champion play-off ==
=== Semifinals ===
Team 1	Score	Team 2
MKB Veszprém	2 – 0	PLER KC

1 May 2009; 18:00	MKB Veszprém	38 – 29	PLER KC	Veszprém Aréna, Veszprém; Attendance: 2,000; Referees: Nagy, Túróczy
1 May 2009; 18:00	Vujin 9	(21–13)	Balogh 6	Veszprém Aréna, Veszprém; Attendance: 2,000; Referees: Nagy, Túróczy
1 May 2009; 18:00	2× (yellow card) 3× (suspension)	Report	3× (yellow card) 5× (suspension)	Veszprém Aréna, Veszprém; Attendance: 2,000; Referees: Nagy, Túróczy

6 May 2009; 18:00	PLER KC	25 – 35	MKB Veszprém	Pestszentimrei Sportkastély, Budapest; Attendance: 800; Referees: Baranyi, Szloska
6 May 2009; 18:00	Balogh 7	(11–18)	three players 6	Pestszentimrei Sportkastély, Budapest; Attendance: 800; Referees: Baranyi, Szloska
6 May 2009; 18:00	3× (yellow card) 3× (suspension)	Report	3× (yellow card) 3× (suspension)	Pestszentimrei Sportkastély, Budapest; Attendance: 800; Referees: Baranyi, Szloska

Team 1	Score	Team 2
Pick Szeged	2 – 0	Dunaferr SE

4 May 2009; 18:00	Pick Szeged	29 – 21	Dunaferr SE	Városi Sportcsarnok, Szeged; Attendance: 2,000; Referees: Dobrovits, Tájok
4 May 2009; 18:00	Ghionea 7	(13–12)	Szalafai 5	Városi Sportcsarnok, Szeged; Attendance: 2,000; Referees: Dobrovits, Tájok
4 May 2009; 18:00	1× (yellow card) 5× (suspension)	Report	2× (yellow card) 6× (suspension)	Városi Sportcsarnok, Szeged; Attendance: 2,000; Referees: Dobrovits, Tájok

7 May 2009; 19:00	Dunaferr SE	26 – 27	Pick Szeged	Dunaferr Sportcsarnok, Dunaújváros; Attendance: 1,000; Referees: Bonifert, Oláh
7 May 2009; 19:00	three players 5	(15–10)	Krivokapić 10	Dunaferr Sportcsarnok, Dunaújváros; Attendance: 1,000; Referees: Bonifert, Oláh
7 May 2009; 19:00	2× (yellow card) 2× (suspension) 1× (red card)	Report	2× (yellow card) 5× (suspension)	Dunaferr Sportcsarnok, Dunaújváros; Attendance: 1,000; Referees: Bonifert, Oláh

=== 3rd Place ===
Team 1	Score	Team 2
Dunaferr SE	3 – 0	PLER KC

15 May 2009; 18:00	Dunaferr SE	30 – 22	PLER KC	Dunaferr Sportcsarnok, Dunaújváros; Attendance: 800; Referees: Herczeg, Südi
15 May 2009; 18:00	Törő 10	(13–10)	Harsányi 5	Dunaferr Sportcsarnok, Dunaújváros; Attendance: 800; Referees: Herczeg, Südi
15 May 2009; 18:00	3× (yellow card) 4× (suspension)	Report	3× (yellow card) 1× (suspension)	Dunaferr Sportcsarnok, Dunaújváros; Attendance: 800; Referees: Herczeg, Südi

20 May 2009; 18:00	PLER KC	24 – 28	Dunaferr SE	Elektromos Sportcsarnok, Budapest; Attendance: 800; Referees: Horváth, Márton
20 May 2009; 18:00	Balogh 4	(13–12)	Törő 8	Elektromos Sportcsarnok, Budapest; Attendance: 800; Referees: Horváth, Márton
20 May 2009; 18:00	2× (yellow card) 1× (red card)	Report	3× (yellow card) 6× (suspension)	Elektromos Sportcsarnok, Budapest; Attendance: 800; Referees: Horváth, Márton

23 May 2009; 18:00	Dunaferr SE	31 – 27	PLER KC	Dunaferr Sportcsarnok, Dunaújváros; Attendance: 900; Referees: Kékes, Kékes
23 May 2009; 18:00	Nagy 7	(17–17)	Harsányi, Lékai 5	Dunaferr Sportcsarnok, Dunaújváros; Attendance: 900; Referees: Kékes, Kékes
23 May 2009; 18:00	2× (yellow card) 4× (suspension)	Report	3× (yellow card) 5× (suspension)	Dunaferr Sportcsarnok, Dunaújváros; Attendance: 900; Referees: Kékes, Kékes

=== Finals ===
Team 1	Score	Team 2
MKB Veszprém	3 – 0	Pick Szeged

16 May 2009; 20:30	MKB Veszprém	35 – 28	Pick Szeged	Veszprém Aréna, Veszprém; Attendance: 5,000; Referees: Kékes, Kékes
16 May 2009; 20:30	Vujin 6	(19–12)	Ghionea 8	Veszprém Aréna, Veszprém; Attendance: 5,000; Referees: Kékes, Kékes
16 May 2009; 20:30	3× (yellow card) 7× (suspension)	Report	6× (yellow card) 3× (suspension) 1× (red card)	Veszprém Aréna, Veszprém; Attendance: 5,000; Referees: Kékes, Kékes

19 May 2009; 18:00	Pick Szeged	24 – 25	MKB Veszprém	Városi Sportcsarnok, Szeged; Attendance: 3,000; Referees: Dobrovits, Tájok
19 May 2009; 18:00	Ghionea 6	(13–17)	Vujin 6	Városi Sportcsarnok, Szeged; Attendance: 3,000; Referees: Dobrovits, Tájok
19 May 2009; 18:00	3× (yellow card) 7× (suspension)	Report	2× (yellow card) 5× (suspension)	Városi Sportcsarnok, Szeged; Attendance: 3,000; Referees: Dobrovits, Tájok

24 May 2009; 12:45	MKB Veszprém	30 – 29	Pick Szeged	Veszprém Aréna, Veszprém; Attendance: 5,000; Referees: Herczeg, Südi
24 May 2009; 12:45	Iváncsik 5	(17–13)	Laluska, Ghionea 6	Veszprém Aréna, Veszprém; Attendance: 5,000; Referees: Herczeg, Südi
24 May 2009; 12:45	3× (yellow card) 4× (suspension)	Report	3× (yellow card) 3× (suspension)	Veszprém Aréna, Veszprém; Attendance: 5,000; Referees: Herczeg, Südi

=== Final standings ===
	Team	Pld	W	D	L	GF	GA	Diff	Pts	Qualification
1	MKB Veszprém	5	5	0	0	163	135	+38	10	2009–10 EHF Champions League group stage
2	Pick Szeged	5	2	0	3	137	137	0	4	2009–10 EHF Champions League group stage
3	Dunaferr SE	5	3	0	2	136	129	+7	6	2009–10 EHF Cup round 3
4	PLER KC	5	0	0	5	127	162	−35	0	2009–10 EHF Cup round 3

Pld - Played; W - Won; L - Lost; PF - Points for; PA - Points against; Diff - Difference; Pts - Points.

== 5 to 8 play-off ==
=== Final standings ===
	Team	Pld	W	D	L	GF	GA	Diff	Pts
5	Balatonfüredi KSE	6	5	0	1	175	148	+25	10
6	Tatabánya KC	6	3	1	2	179	167	+12	7
7	Mezőkövesdi KC	6	2	2	2	160	173	−13	6
8	Debreceni KSE	6	0	1	5	143	169	−26	1

Pld - Played; W - Won; L - Lost; PF - Points for; PA - Points against; Diff - Difference; Pts - Points.

=== Results ===
In the table below the home teams are listed on the left and the away teams along the top.

	BAL	TAT	DEB	MEZ
Balatonfüred		34–30	34–21	28–20
Tatabánya	27–30		29–22	34–25
Debrecen	21–23	25–28		27–28
Mezőkövesd	29–26	31–31	27–27	

== Relegation round ==
=== Final standings ===
	Team	Pld	W	D	L	GF	GA	Diff	Pts	Relegation
9	Csurgói KK	6	5	1	0	188	148	+40	11	
10	Kecskemét SE	6	3	1	2	172	165	+7	7	
11	Gyöngyösi KK	6	3	0	3	187	189	−2	6	
12	Százhalombattai KE	6	0	0	6	158	203	−45	0	Relegation to the 2009–10 Nemzeti Bajnokság I/B

Pld - Played; W - Won; L - Lost; PF - Points for; PA - Points against; Diff - Difference; Pts - Points.

=== Results ===
In the table below the home teams are listed on the left and the away teams along the top.

	GYÖ	KSE	CSU	SZÁ
Gyöngyös		32–29	27–29	38–26
Kecskemét	37–30		26–26	32–22
Csurgó	35–23	31–19		27–20
Százhalombatta	33–37	24–29	33–40	
