= Tamás Mocsai =

Hungarian handball player (born 1978)

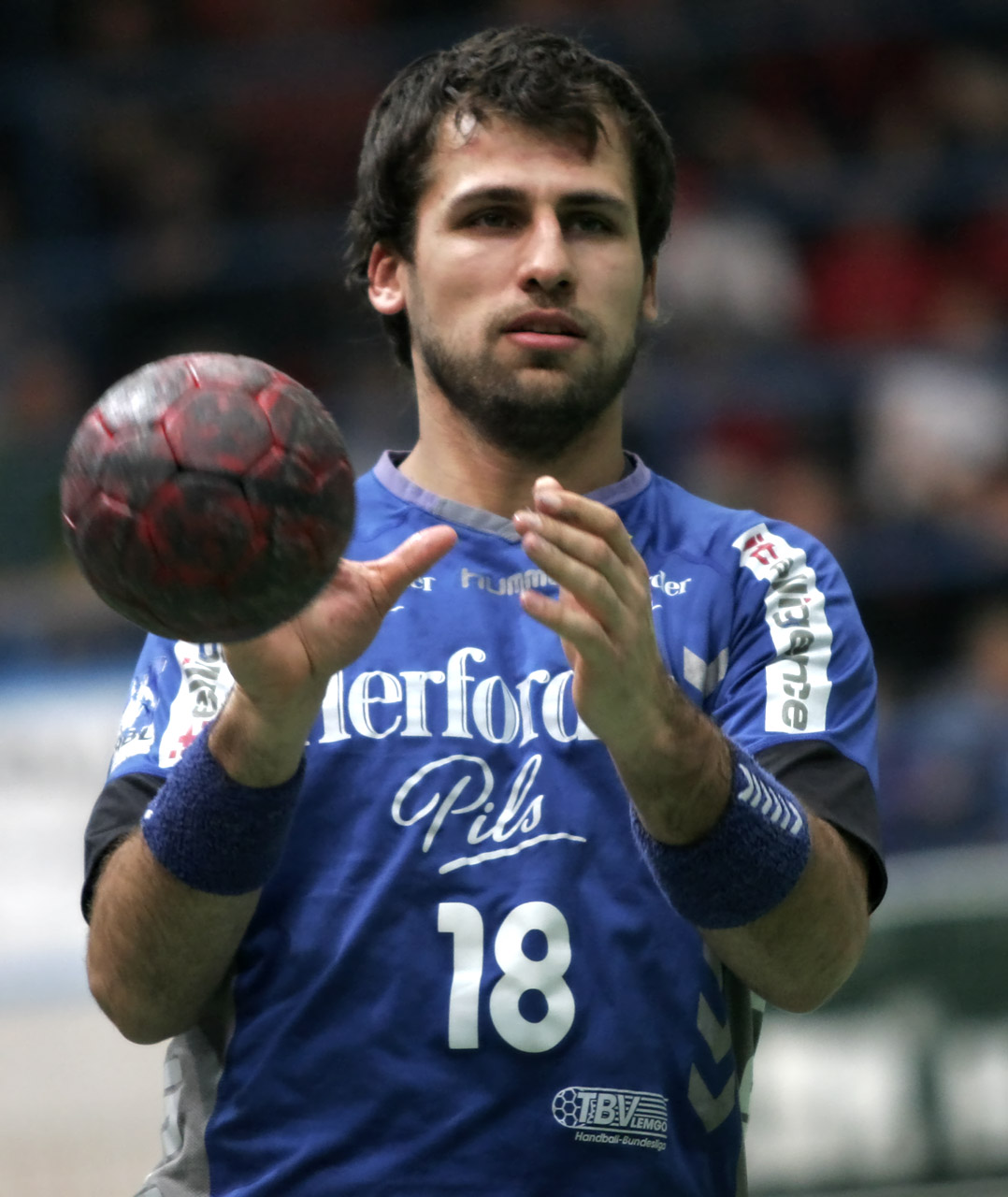

Personal information
- Nationality: Hungarian
- Born: 9 December 1978 (age 47) Budapest, Hungary
- Height: 1.96 m (6 ft 5 in)

Sport
- Sport: Handball
- Position: Right back
- Current club: MKB Veszprém KC
- Number: 5

Youth career
- Years: Team
- 1989–1994: TBV Lemgo
- 1994–1997: GWD Minden

Senior clubs
- Years: Team
- 1997–1998: TuS Nettelstedt-Lübbecke
- 1998–1999: TV Jahn Duderstadt
- 1999–2002: Dunaferr SE
- 2002–2004: TV Suhr
- 2004–2005: Pfadi Winterthur
- 2005–2006: SG Kronau/Östringen
- 2006–2010: TBV Lemgo
- 2010–2012: SG Flensburg-Handewitt
- 2012–2013: TSV Hannover-Burgdorf
- 2013–2014: MKB Veszprém KC
National team
Years	Team	Apps	(Gls)
1999–2014	Hungary	190	(439)

Tamás Mocsai (born 9 December 1978) is a retired Hungarian handball player who played for MKB Veszprém KC and the Hungarian national team. He served as the mayor of Felsőmocsolád between 2014 and 2024.

== Career ==
=== Club ===
He started to play handball at the age of 10 in Lemgo, where his father, Lajos Mocsai was in charge at that time. He spent his youth career in Germany, before debuting in the Handball-Bundesliga. His biggest success during his spell in Germany was the EHF City Cup, he achieved in 1998.

Then he moved to Hungarian vice-champions Dunaferr SE, with whom he has broken the long-term hegemony of MKB Veszprém KC and won the Hungarian National Championship in his first season. He collected a silver and a bronze in the following seasons, and in addition, he lifted the Hungarian Cup trophy in 2001.

Later, he tried his hands in Switzerland. He signed to TV Suhr in 2002 and quickly became a fans' favourite. He was voted the best player of his team in 2003, and finished third on the goalscoring charts. He switched to domestic rivals and Champions League aspirants Pfadi Winterthur in 2004 to replace Cho Chi-Hyo, who was transferred to Wacker Thun. Mocsai signed a two-year deal with his new team, however, the bad performances and the restructure of the board resulted a mass exodus in 2005. Many players left the club, including Mocsai, who started the season at SG Kronau/Östringen.

At the end of the season he signed a three-year contract with his former club TBV Lemgo. With the North Rhine-Westphalian team he won the EHF Cup in 2010, after beating Kadetten Schaffhausen in the finals. Between 2010 and 2012 he played for SG Flensburg-Handewitt, subsequently he signed a two-year contract with Bundesliga rivals TSV Hannover-Burgdorf. In December 2013 he left Hannover and went to MKB Veszprém KC.

=== International ===
The first major event he participated was the 2004 European Championship. Since then he played on four World Championships (2007, 2009, 2011, 2013) and three European Championships (2008, 2012, 2014). He was also present at the 2004 Summer Olympics, where Hungary finished fourth. He was also part of the Hungarian team that finished fourth at the 2012 Summer Olympics.

== Achievements ==
- Nemzeti Bajnokság I:
  - Winner: 2000, 2014
  - Silver Medalist: 2001
  - Bronze Medalist: 2002
- Magyar Kupa:
  - Winner: 2001, 2014
- EHF Cup Winners' Cup:
  - Winner: 2012
  - Finalist: 2000
  - Semifinalist: 2002
- EHF Cup:
  - Winner: 2010
- EHF City Cup:
  - Winner: 1998
- EHF Champions Trophy
  - Third Placed: 2000

== Individual awards ==
- Golden Cross of the Cross of Merit of the Republic of Hungary (2012)
