= Žarko Šešum =

Serbian handball player (born 1986)

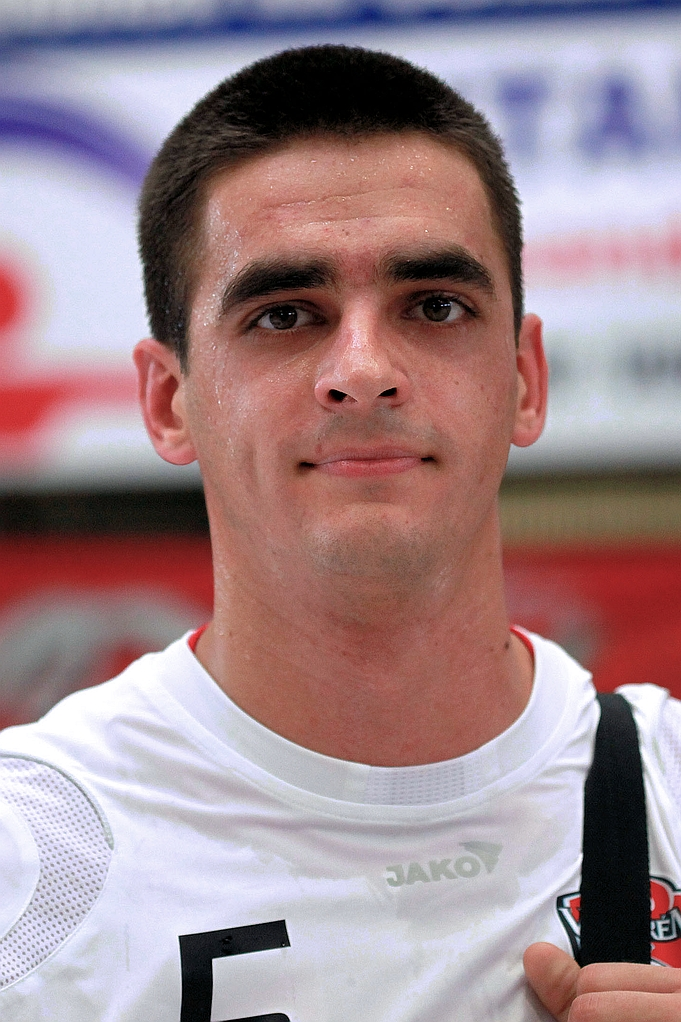
- Šešum in 2009

Personal information
- Full name: Žarko Šešum
- Nationality: Serbian
- Born: 16 June 1986 (age 40) Bačka Palanka, SR Serbia, SFR Yugoslavia
- Height: 1.96 m (6 ft 5 in)

Sport
- Sport: Handball
- Position: Left back

Youth career
- Years: Team
- –: Sintelon

Senior clubs
- Years: Team
- 2002–2007: Sintelon
- 2007–2010: MKB Veszprém
- 2010–2014: Rhein-Neckar Löwen
- 2014–2018: Frisch Auf Göppingen
- 2018–2021: Kadetten Schaffhausen
National team
- Years: Team
- 2006–2019: Serbia
Medal record
Men's handball
Representing Serbia and Montenegro
U21 World Championship
Silver medal – second place	2005 Hungary	Team
U19 World Championship
Gold medal – first place	2005 Qatar	Team
U18 European Championship
Gold medal – first place	2004 Serbia and Montenegro	Team
Representing Serbia
European Championship
Silver medal – second place	2012 Serbia	Team
Mediterranean Games
Gold medal – first place	2009 Pescara	Team

Žarko Šešum (Serbian Cyrillic: Жарко Шешум; born 16 June 1986) is a retired Serbian handball player.

== Club career ==
Born in Bačka Palanka, Šešum started out at his hometown club Sintelon. He was promoted to the senior squad in the 2002–03 season, at age 16. In early 2007, Šešum was transferred to Hungary and signed with MKB Veszprém. He helped the side win three consecutive championships, though his time there was somewhat marred by an assault in a nightclub in 2009, in which he was injured and teammate Marian Cozma was stabbed to death. In 2010, Šešum moved to Germany and joined Rhein-Neckar Löwen, spending the next four years with the club. He subsequently played for fellow German team Frisch Auf Göppingen from 2014 to 2018, winning two successive EHF Cup titles (2016 and 2017).

== International career ==
=== Youth ===
At youth level, Šešum was an instrumental member of the Serbia and Montenegro winning squad at the European Under-18 Championship in August 2004. He subsequently led his nation to the gold medal at the World Under-19 Championship in August 2005. Later the same month, Šešum was an important member of the team that finished as runners-up at the World Under-21 Championship.

=== Senior ===
A Serbia international since its inception, Šešum made his major debut for the national team at the 2009 World Championship. He was also a member of the squad that won the silver medal at the 2012 European Championship, but missed the final due to injury. Subsequently, Šešum was selected to compete at the 2012 Summer Olympics.

== Honours ==
MKB Veszprém

- Nemzeti Bajnokság I: 2007–08, 2008–09, 2009–10
- Magyar Kupa: 2006–07, 2008–09, 2009–10
- EHF Cup Winners' Cup: 2007–08

Rhein-Neckar Löwen

- EHF Cup: 2012–13

Frisch Auf Göppingen

- EHF Cup: 2015–16, 2016–17

Kadetten Schaffhausen

- Swiss Handball League: 2018–19
