= Felsőmocsolád =

- Village
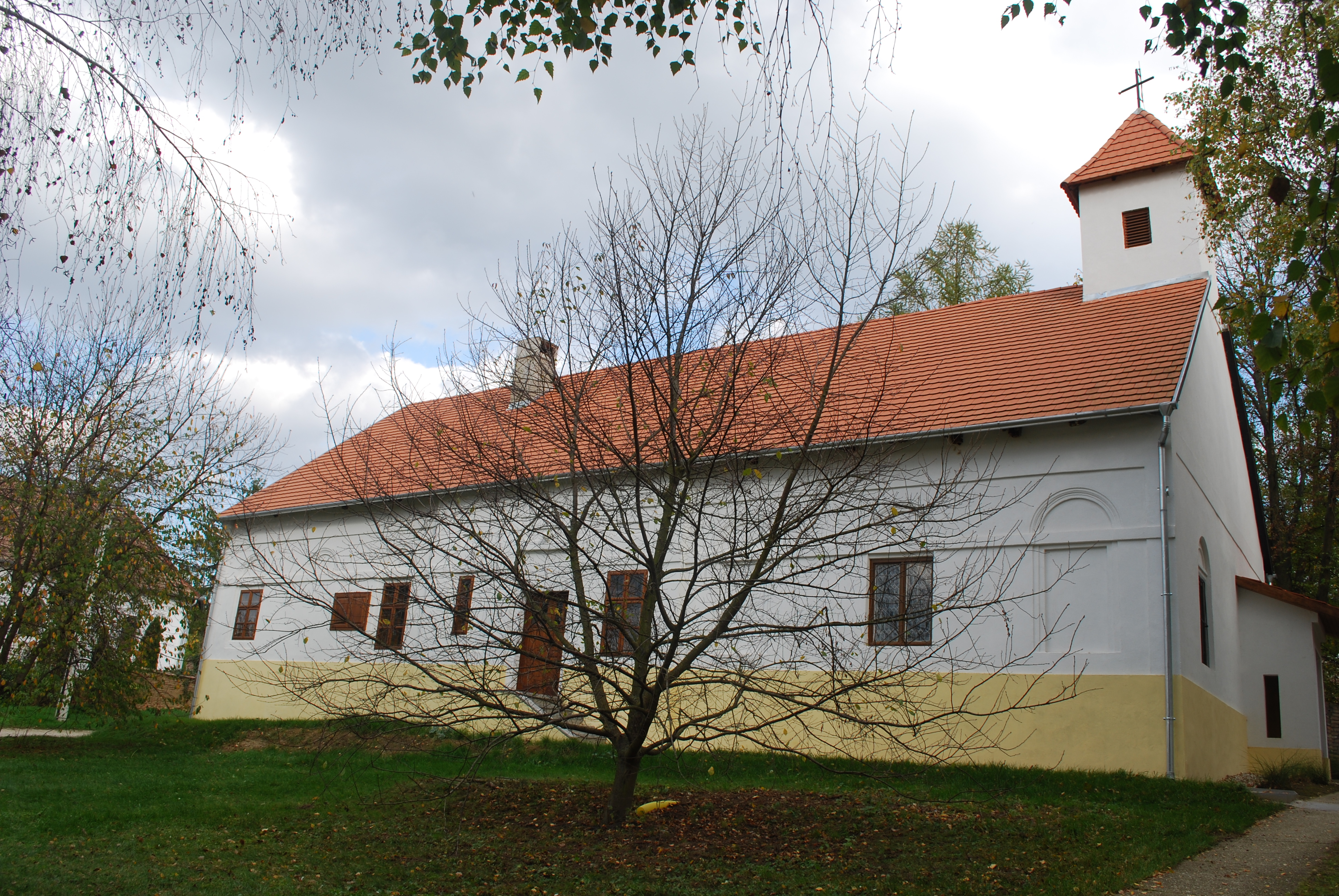
- Roman Catholic Church of Felsőmocsolád (former Erőss Mansion)

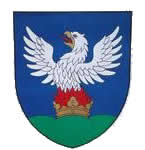
- Coat of arms

- Location of Somogy county in Hungary

- Location of Felsőmocsolád
- Coordinates: 46.58187°N 17.82762°E
- Country: Hungary
- Region: Southern Transdanubia
- County: Somogy
- District: Kaposvár
- RC Diocese: Kaposvár

Government
  - Mayor: Tamás Mocsai

Area
  - Total: 16.51 km^{2} (6.37 sq mi)

Population (2017)
  - Total: 361
  - Density: 21.9/km^{2} (56.6/sq mi)
- Demonym(s): mocsoládi, felsőmocsoládi
- Time zone: UTC+1 (CET)
  - Summer (DST): UTC+2 (CEST)
- Postal code: 7456
- Area code: (+36) 82
- NUTS 3 code: HU232
- MP: Mihály Witzmann (Fidesz)
- Website: Felsőmocsolád Online

Felsőmocsolád is a village in Somogy county, Hungary.

== Etymology ==
Its name derives from the world mocsola older version of the Hungarian mocsár (English: marsh). So Felsőmocsolád consists of felső (English: upper), mocsola and -d suffix.
