= István Varga (handballer) =

Hungarian handball player (1943-2014)

Personal information
- Nationality: Hungarian
- Born: 7 September 1943 Abony, Hungary
- Died: 6 December 2014 (aged 71) Debrecen, Hungary

Sport
- Sport: Handball
- Position: Back player
National team
Years	Team	Apps
–	Hungary	127

István Varga (Hungarian pronunciation: [ˈiʃtvaːn ˈvɒrɡɒ]; 7 September 1943 – 6 December 2014) was a Hungarian international handball player and Olympic participant.

Varga spent his most successful years in Debrecen, where he was part of the Debreceni Dózsa SE, that won 5 Hungarian league and 3 cup titles in the 1970s. He was also named Hungarian Handballer of the Year in 1975 and was the top scorer of the Hungarian championship six times between 1972 and 1979.

He played 127-times for the Hungarian national team and competed at a number of major tournaments. In 1972 he was part of the Hungarian team that finished in the eighth place at the 1972 Summer Olympics. Varga played all six matches and scored 32 goals. At the 1976 Summer Olympics the team finished in the sixth place. He played all five matches and scored 21 goals.

Varga also participated at two World Championships in 1967 and 1970, achieving an eighth place in both occasions.

With his performances during these years, he earned a place both in the Europe Selection and World Selection.

In 2011 he was diagnosed with lung cancer. Varga died on 6 December 2014 in Debrecen at the age of 71.

== Awards ==
- Hungarian Handballer of the Year: 1975
- Nemzeti Bajnokság I Top Scorer: 1972, 1974, 1975, 1976, 1978, 1979
