= Marko Vujin =

Serbian handball player (born 1984)

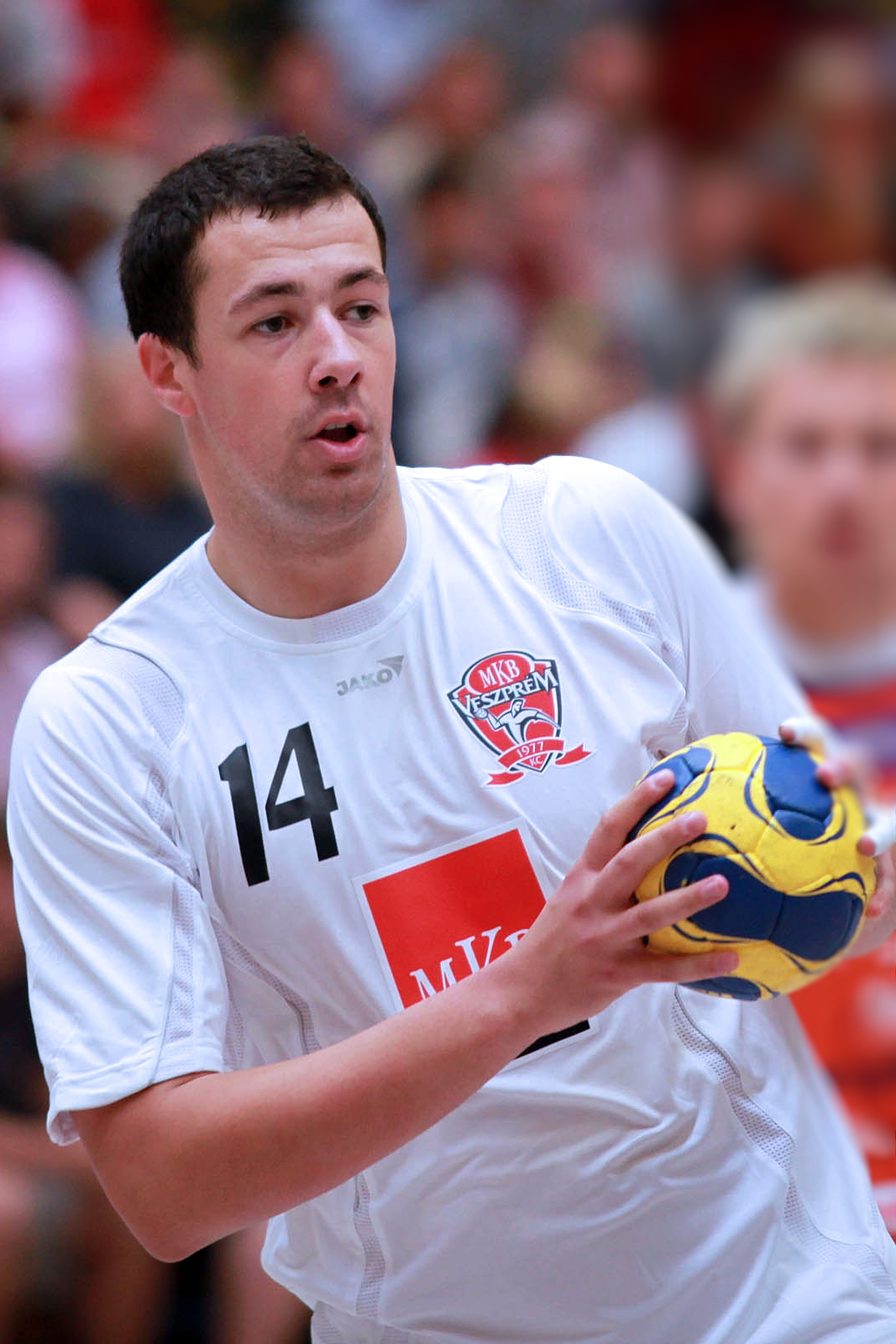

Personal information
- Nationality: Serbian
- Born: 7 December 1984 (age 41) Bačka Palanka, SFR Yugoslavia
- Height: 1.99 m (6 ft 6 in)

Sport
- Sport: Handball
- Position: Right back
- Number: 41

Senior clubs
- Years: Team
- –2003: RK Sintelon
- 2003–2006: Dunaferr SE
- 2006–2012: MKB Veszprém
- 2012–2019: THW Kiel
- 2019–2020: Sporting CP
- 2020–2021: RK Vardar 1961
- 2021: SC Pick Szeged
National team
Years	Team	Apps	(Gls)
2003–2021	Serbia	126	(489)
Medal record
European Championship
Silver medal – second place	2012 Serbia

Marko Vujin (Serbian Cyrillic: Марко Вујин, born 7 December 1984) is a former Serbian handball player who plays for SC Pick Szeged and the Serbian national team.

== Career ==
Vujin started his professional career in his hometown club RK Sintelon, where he played with national teammate Žarko Šešum and Bosnian goalkeeper Danijel Šarić, who later won the EHF Champions League with FC Barcelona Handbol.

In July 2003, he was signed by the Hungarian Championship outfit Dunaferr SE, who were strengthening their squad for the forthcoming EHF Cup campaign.

Vujin spent three years with the Danube-side and collected a championship bronze medal in each season. Although during his spell in Dunaferr the club did not manage to break the dominance of the SC Pick Szeged–Veszprém KC duo, he showed his unique scoring skills and was crowned as the top scorer of the Hungarian Championship in the 2005–06 season.

His performances drew the attention of MKB Veszprém, and the record champions secured the services of the right back in the summer of 2006. In his new club Vujin has grown into a player and played a significant role in Veszprém's success. He helped the team to the EHF Cup Winners' Cup title in 2008 with scoring nine goals in the first leg of the finals, that was eventually won by the Hungarian club with a five-goal margin.

On 30 October 2009, while playing against Hungary in an international friendly tournament, Vujin suffered a serious knee injury that had to be operated. He underwent surgery on 4 December 2009 and the recovery process took four months. He returned into action on 3 April 2010 against HCM Constanța in an EHF Champions League match. He entered the field first in the 45th minute to take a penalty shot, which he missed, however, his teammate Carlos Pérez scored from the rebound. Few minutes later he got another chance from the line and this time he did not miss.

In the autumn of 2010, he reached his best form again and in the winter break he topped the EHF Champions League top scorers' list with 65 goals, sixteen goals ahead of second placed Uwe Gensheimer. His continuous superb play attracted the attention of THW Kiel, the Champions League winners of the past season, and the German club offered a contract for Vujin that Veszprem could not match. As a result, the Serbian international will now join Kiel in 2012, once his current contract expires.

He played for the Serbia men's national handball team at the 2012 European Men's Handball Championship and won a silver medal.

== Achievements ==
- Nemzeti Bajnokság I:
  - Winner: 2008, 2009, 2010, 2011, 2012
  - Silver Medalist: 2007
  - Bronze Medalist: 2004, 2005, 2006
- Magyar Kupa:
  - Winner: 2007, 2009, 2010, 2011, 2012
  - Finalist: 2008
- EHF Cup Winners' Cup:
  - Winner: 2008
- EHF Champions Trophy:
  - Finalist: 2008
- European Championship:
  - Silver Medalist: 2012

== Individual awards ==
- Nemzeti Bajnokság I Top Scorer: 2006, 2012
