= Lajos Mocsai =

Hungarian handball player and coach (born 1954)

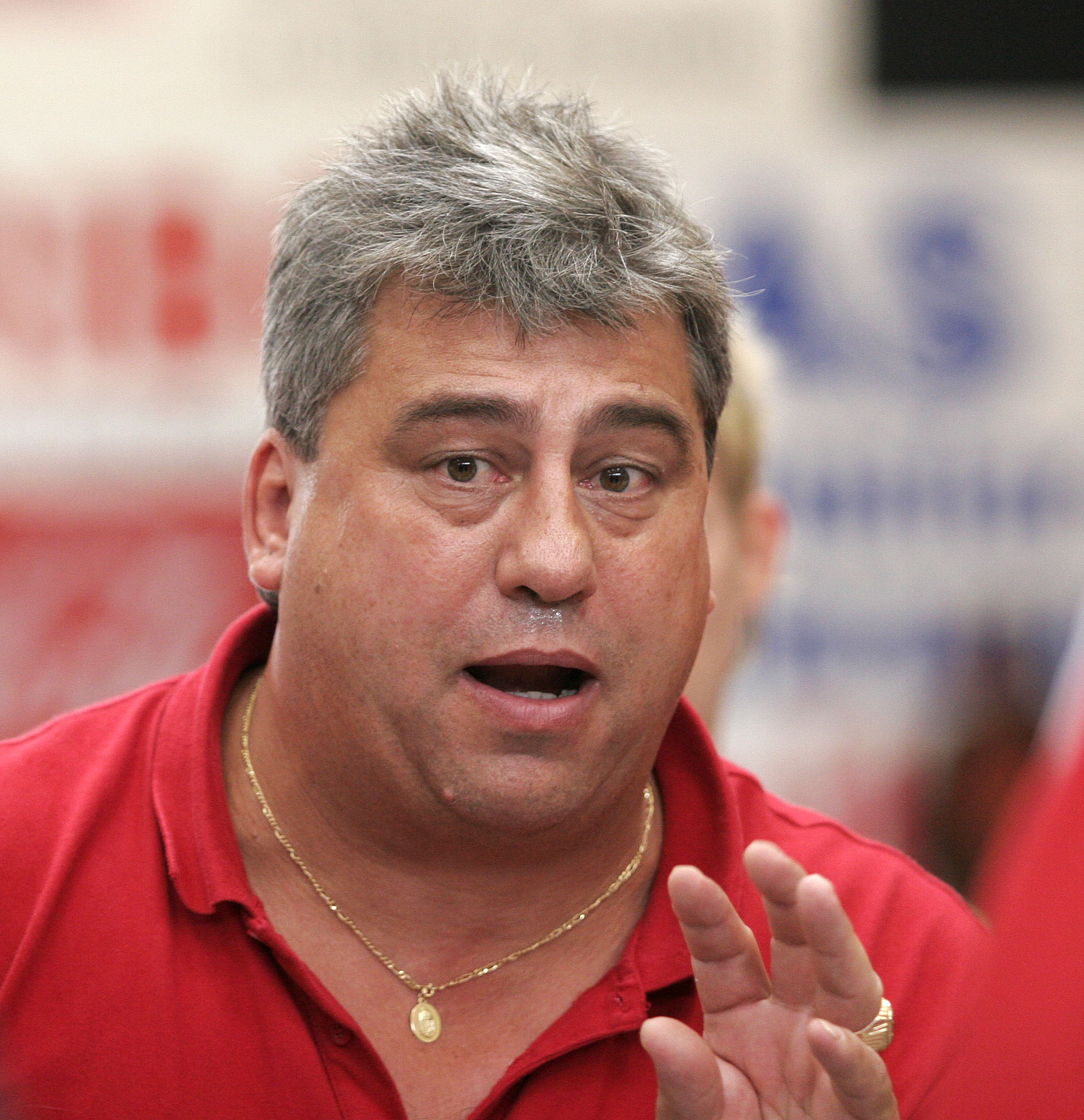

Personal information
- Nationality: Hungarian
- Born: 10 March 1954 (age 72) Szeged, Hungary
- Height: 1.86 m (6 ft 1 in)

Sport
- Sport: Handball

Senior clubs
- Years: Team
- 1968–1973: Tisza Volán SC
- 1973–1978: Testnevelési Főiskola SE
- 1978–1979: Vasas SC
- 1979–1981: Budapest Spartacus SC
National team
Years	Team	Apps
1974–1982	Hungary	20

Teams managed
- 1978–1980: Testnevelési Főiskola SE – M
- 1980–1981: Testnevelési Főiskola SE – W
- 1981–1983: Vasas SC
- 1983–1985: Budapest Honvéd SE
- 1985–1989: Hungary Men
- 1989–1996: TBV Lemgo
- 1997–1998: TuS Nettelstedt-Lübbecke
- 1998–2004: Hungary Women
- 2005: VfL Gummersbach
- 2005–2007: Vasas SC
- 2007–2012: MKB Veszprém KC
- 2010–2014: Hungary Men

Lajos Mocsai (Hungarian: [ˈlɒjoʃ ˈmot͡ʃɒi]; born 10 March 1954) is a former Hungarian international handball player, coach, university professor and sports director.

Mocsai worked as the head coach of MKB Veszprém KC since his appointment in 2007, and beside his club team duties, he also served as the technical director of the Hungarian men's national team from February 2010, before taking over the head coach position from István Csoknyai. In the summer of 2012 Mocsai resigned from the coaching position of Veszprém to fully concentrate on his work by the national team. Two years later he resigned from the national team as well, to make himself clear for the rector position of the University of Physical Education in Budapest.

== Career ==
One of the most successful managers in Europe, Mocsai has won several continental club competition trophies, led the Hungarian women's national team to European Championship title and won silver both on the World Championship and the Olympic Games with the same team. In addition, he also captured a World Championship silver with the Hungarian men's national team in 1986.

Two of the players who were trained by him, namely Daniel Stephan and Bojana Radulovics were given the IHF World Player of the Year award.

Mocsai also has been honoured many times, from which the most valuable is probably the Life Achievement Award, which he received on the ten years jubilee of the European Handball Federation in 2002. The prestigious prize is adjudged by strict criteria and was awarded only to four coaches in Europe.

In 2011 TBV Lemgo celebrated its 100th anniversary and on this occasion the club honoured the greatest individuals who served the club. Mocsai was given the Head Coach of the Century (Jahrhunderttrainer) title for his hard to work with that he built up professional handball in Lemgo.

== Personal ==
He is married. He has four children: three daughters and a son. One of the daughters, Dorottya, and his son Tamás are both professional handball players.

== Coaching achievements ==
=== Club ===
- Nemzeti Bajokság I – women:
  - Winner: 1982
- Magyar Kupa – women:
  - Winner: 1982
- Nemzeti Bajokság I – men:
  - Winner: 1983, 2008, 2009, 2010, 2011, 2012
- Magyar Kupa – men:
  - Winner: 1983, 2009, 2010, 2011, 2012
- DHB-Pokal – men:
  - Winner: 1995
- EHF Champions League – women:
  - Winner: 1982
- EHF Cup Winners' Cup – men:
  - Winner: 1996, 2008
- EHF Cup – men:
  - Winner: 1998

=== National team ===
- Olympic Games – women's tournament:
  - Silver Medalist: 2000
  - Fifth Placed: 2004
- Olympic Games – men's tournament:
  - Fourth Placed: 1988
  - Fourth Placed: 2012
- World Championship – women's tournament:
  - Silver Medalist: 2003
  - Fifth Placed: 1999
  - Sixth Placed: 2001
- World Championship – men's tournament:
  - Silver Medalist: 1986
- European Championship – women's tournament:
  - Winner: 2000
  - Bronze Medalist: 1998
  - Fifth Placed: 2002

== Individual awards and recognitions ==
- Knight's Cross of the Order of Merit of the Republic of Hungary (2000)
- Lifetime Achievement Award of the European Handball Federation (2002)
- Endre Kerezsi Award (2003)
- Hungarian Coach of the Year (2009)
- Fair Play Award for the propagation of sportsmanship – Hungarian Olympic Committee (2011)
- Head Coach of the Century of TBV Lemgo (2011)
- Hungarian Handball Coach of the Year (2012)
