= Gyula Gál =

Hungarian handball player (born 1976)

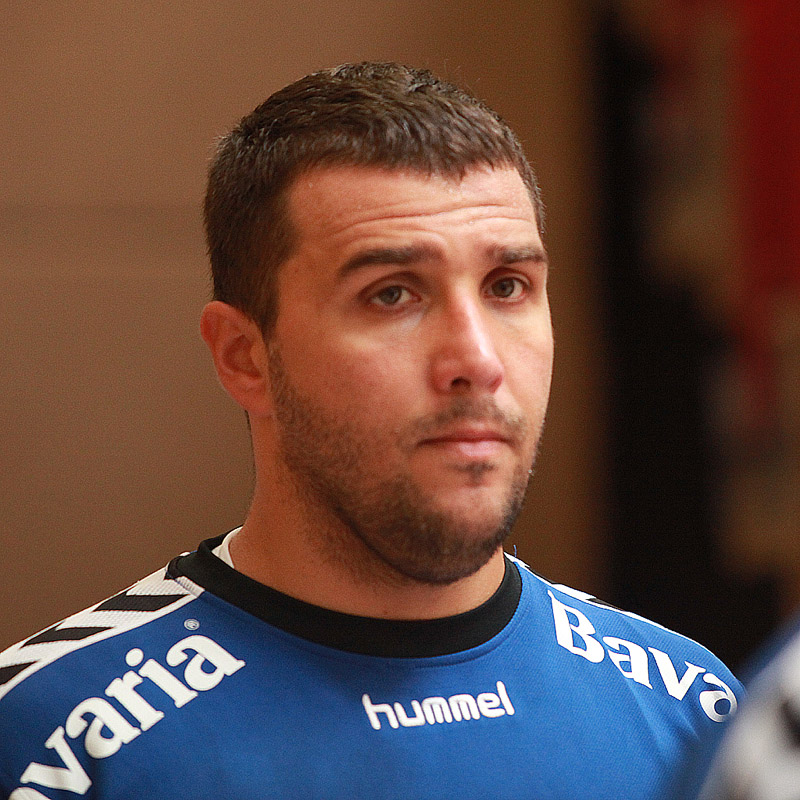

Personal information
- Full name: Gyula Gál
- Nationality: Hungarian
- Born: 18 August 1976 (age 50) Várpalota, Hungary
- Height: 1.94 m (6 ft 4 in)

Sport
- Sport: Handball
- Position: Line Player
- Current club: Retired

Senior clubs
- Years: Team
- –1997: (Hungary) Komlói Bányász SK
- 1997–2001: (Hungary) Dunaferr SE
- 2001–2009: (Hungary) MKB Veszprém KC
- loan: → (Hungary) Tatabánya KC
- 2010–2012: (Croatia) RK Zagreb
- 2012: (Hungary) Tatabánya KC
National team
Years	Team	Apps	(Gls)
1999–2011	Hungary	180	(442)
- Updated on 4 September 2018

Gyula Gál (born 18 August 1976 in Várpalota) is a retired Hungarian handball player.

He made his international debut on 15 March 1999 against France.

Gál suffered a torn knee ligament in April 2009 and since then he was struggling to fight back into the first team of MKB Veszprém KC and was also missing from the national team selection. To get more playing minutes and to win back his form, he was loaned to Tatabánya KC in October 2010.

However, this loan spell was cut short as he was signed by RK Zagreb in January 2010. The Croatian side was in need of a line player, as Frank Løke has been suspended for nine months by the European Handball Federation for signing a contract with both Skjern and Zagreb at the same time, and first choice pivot Igor Vori moved to HSV Hamburg during the summer transfer window. Gál's contract runs till June 2012.

== Achievements ==
- Nemzeti Bajnokság I:
  - Winner: 2000, 2002, 2003, 2004, 2005, 2006, 2008, 2009
  - Silver Medallist: 1998, 1999, 2001, 2007
- Magyar Kupa:
  - Winner: 2001, 2002, 2003, 2004, 2005, 2007, 2009
  - Silver Medallist: 2006, 2008
- Prva hrvatska rukometna liga:
  - Winner: 2010
- Hrvatski rukometni kup:
  - Winner: 2010
- EHF Champions League:
  - Semifinalist: 2002
  - Quarterfinalst: 2003, 2006
- EHF Cup Winners' Cup:
  - Winner: 2008
  - Finalist: 2000
- EHF Champions Trophy:
  - Finalist: 2002, 2008
  - Third Placed: 2000

== Individual awards ==
- Hungarian Handballer of the Year: 2006
