= 2009–10 EHF Cup =

Tournament details
- Dates: 5 September 2009 - 22 May 2010
- Teams: 56 (from European Handball Federation confederations)

Final positions
- Champions: (Germany) TBV Lemgo
- Runners-up: (Switzerland) Kadetten Schaffhausen

Tournament statistics
- Top scorer: (Germany) Michael Kraus (56 goals)

The 2090–10 EHF Cup season was the 29th edition of the tournament. VfL Gummersbach were the reigning champions. TBV Lemgo won the title, beating Kadetten Schaffhausen in the final.

== Knockout stage ==
=== Round 1 ===
Team 1	Agg.	Team 2	1st leg	2nd leg
Põlva Serviti (Estonia)	50–54	(Belarus) SKA Minsk	28–22 (13–11)	22–32 (10–16)
HC Tbilisi (Georgia (country))	65–55	(Cyprus) "Kouroushi Proodevtikos" Paphos	33–30 (19–15)	32–25 (14–14)
RK Borac Banja Luka (Bosnia and Herzegovina)	56–41	(Netherlands) Bevo HC	28–19 (17 – 7)	28–22 (12–12)
HCB OKD Karviná (Czech Republic)	59–45	(Luxembourg) HB Dudelange	32–21 (15–11)	27–24 (13–12)
Haslum HK (Norway)	49–52	(Czech Republic) HC Dukla Praha	24–24 (12–15)	25–28 (12–15)
Gammadue Secchia (Italy)	55–33	(Greece) AC Diomidis Argous	31–15 (17 – 8)	24–18 (10 – 9)
RK Sutjeska Nikšić (Montenegro)	49–55	(Luxembourg) Handball Esch	23–23 (10–13)	26–32 (12–14)
HV Aalsmeer (Netherlands)	53–60	(Iceland) Fram Reykjavík	23–30 (11–18)	30–30 (16–16)

=== Round 2 ===
Team 1	Agg.	Team 2	1st leg	2nd leg
Wisła Płock (Poland)	51–57	(Iceland) Haukar Hafnarfjörður	30–28 (15–12)	21–29 (6 – 17)
A1 Bregenz (Austria)	66–60	(Italy) Handball Casarano	35–30 (16–16)	31–30 (17–18)
Beşiktaş JK (Turkey)	58–69	(Serbia) RK Crvena zvezda	34–30 (16–13)	24–39 (13–21)
Fram Reykjavík (Iceland)	40–65	(Slovakia) Tatran Prešov	23–27 (11–12)	17–38 (7 – 16)
SHK DIU-Shumen (Bulgaria)	33–82	(Sweden) IK Sävehof	18–46 (8 – 19)	15–36 (4 – 19)
HC Dukla Praha (Czech Republic)	43–55	(Ukraine) ZTR Zaporizhzhia	24–29 (10–16)	19–26 (11–14)
SKA Minsk (Belarus)	42–40	(Cyprus) SPE Strovolos Nicosia	21–19 (8 – 9)	21–21 (13–11)
Sport Lisboa e Benfica (Portugal)	63–46	(Georgia (country)) HC Tbilisi	34–21 (21–11)	29–25 (16–14)
HC Dinamo Minsk (Belarus)	87–43	(Turkey) Maliye Milli Piyango SK	53–19 (24 – 9)	34–24 (17–15)
Gammadue Secchia (Italy)	44–69	(Croatia) RK Nexe	25–30 (12–12)	19–39 (12–18)
UCM Sport Reşiţa (Romania)	68–61	(Czech Republic) HCB OKD Karviná	40–32 (21–12)	28–29 (14–14)
Alpla HC Hard (Austria)	47–40	(Ukraine) HC "Bydivelnik Brovary"	28–17 (12 – 6)	19–23 (9 – 10)
RK Budućnost Podgorica (Montenegro)	65–63	(Bosnia and Herzegovina) RK Borac Banja Luka	36–30 (17–14)	29–33 (18–16)
RK Partizan (Serbia)	67–53	(Estonia) HC Kehra	34–25 (14–13)	33–28 (15–13)
Maccabi Rishon LeZion (Israel)	61–49	(Luxembourg) Handball Esch	32–20 (15 – 6)	29–29 (14–12)
FC Porto Vitalis (Portugal)	60–45	(North Macedonia) Vardar	32–20 (15 – 7)	28–25 (14–16)

=== Round 3 ===
Team 1	Agg.	Team 2	1st leg	2nd leg
BM Aragón (Spain)	54–48	(Austria) A1 Bregenz	39–22 (21–10)	15–26 (10–11)
FC Porto Vitalis (Portugal)	47–55	(Germany) Frisch Auf Göppingen	24–24 (14–13)	23–31 (12–16)
Maccabi Rishon LeZion (Israel)	47–86	(Germany) SG Flensburg-Handewitt	22–43 (9 – 17)	25–43 (13–23)
RK Partizan (Serbia)	47–51	(Denmark) GOG Svendborg TGI	28–24 (12–10)	19–27 (10–17)
Alpla HC Hard (Austria)	50–52	(Russia) Zarja Kaspija Astrakhan	28–24 (14–13)	22–28 (10–13)
RK Celje (Slovenia)	62–47	(Ukraine) ZTR Zaporizhzhia	37–21 (21–11)	25–26 (13–15)
HC Dinamo Minsk (Belarus)	59–63	(France) Dunkerque HBGL	29–24 (15–12)	30–39 (15–19)
TBV Lemgo (Germany)	74–51	(Montenegro) RK Budućnost Podgorica	46–23 (25–11)	28–28 (13–15)
RK Crvena zvezda (Serbia)	56–63	(Spain) Naturhouse La Rioja	30–30 (16–16)	26–33 (13–18)
Tatran Prešov (Slovakia)	49–42	(Hungary) Dunaferr SE	27–19 (14–10)	22–23 (10–14)
RK Nexe (Croatia)	60–64	(Switzerland) Kadetten Schaffhausen	30–30 (8 – 13)	30–34 (15–12)
SKIF Krasnodar (Russia)	58–64	(Portugal) Sport Lisboa e Benfica	28–29 (16–13)	30–35 (13–16)
IK Sävehof (Sweden)	54–61	(Denmark) AaB Håndbold	26–28 (13–14)	28–33 (10–17)
Istres Ouest Provence HB (France)	59–52	(Belarus) SKA Minsk	32–25 (14–14)	27–27 (12–12)
RK Trimo Trebnje (Slovenia)	62–60	(Romania) UCM Sport Reşiţa	32–28 (16–14)	30–32 (15–14)
Haukar Hafnarfjörður (Iceland)	48–47	(Hungary) PLER KC	26–26 (10–14)	22–21 (12–12)

=== Round of 16 ===
Team 1	Agg.	Team 2	1st leg	2nd leg
RK Trimo Trebnje (Slovenia)	58–60	(Spain) BM Aragón	35–26 (18–12)	23–34 (9 – 14)
Frisch Auf Göppingen (Germany)	65–60	(Denmark) AaB Håndbold	39–30 (18–16)	26–30 (8 – 15)
Kadetten Schaffhausen (Switzerland)	65–47	(Russia) Zarja Kaspija Astrakhan	29–21 (14 – 9)	36–26 (20–14)
TBV Lemgo (Germany)	58–48	(Portugal) Sport Lisboa e Benfica	27–30 (13–13)	31–18 (14–10)
Naturhouse La Rioja (Spain)	58–47	(Iceland) Haukar Hafnarfjörður	34–24 (15 – 9)	24–23 (10–11)
SG Flensburg-Handewitt (Germany)	65–54	(France) Istres Ouest Provence Handball	34–23 (16–12)	31–31 (18–15)
Dunkerque HBGL (France)	20 – 0	(Denmark) GOG Svendborg TGI *	10 – 0 (0 – 0)	10 – 0 (0 – 0)
RK Celje (Slovenia)	61–57	(Slovakia) Tatran Prešov	35–32 (18–15)	26–25 (12 – 9)

^{*} Dunkerque HBGL vs GOG Svendborg TGI was cancelled after Svendborg declared bankruptcy.

=== Quarterfinals ===
Team 1	Agg.	Team 2	1st leg	2nd leg
Frisch Auf Göppingen (Germany)	57–57	(Switzerland) Kadetten Schaffhausen	33–29	24–28
Dunkerque HBGL (France)	57–63	(Spain) Naturhouse La Rioja	33–33	24–30
SG Flensburg-Handewitt (Germany)	68–61	(Slovenia) RK Celje	33–29	35–32
TBV Lemgo (Germany)	61–55	(Spain) CAI BM Aragón	30–23	31–32

=== Semifinals ===
Team 1	Agg.	Team 2	1st leg	2nd leg
Naturhouse La Rioja (Spain)	56–59	(Germany) TBV Lemgo	30–25	26–34
SG Flensburg-Handewitt (Germany)	52–54	(Switzerland) Kadetten Schaffhausen	31–30	21–24

=== Finals ===
Team 1	Agg.	Team 2	1st leg	2nd leg
TBV Lemgo (Germany)	52–48	(Switzerland) Kadetten Schaffhausen	24–18	28–30

EHF Cup 2009–10
Winner

TBV Lemgo
