= Szabolcs Törő =

Hungarian handball player (born 1983)

Personal information
- Full name: Szabolcs Törő
- Nationality: Hungarian
- Born: 10 March 1983 (age 43) Ajka, Hungary
- Height: 1.83 m (6 ft 0 in)

Sport
- Sport: Handball
- Position: Left Wing
- Current club: SC Pick Szeged
- Number: 19

Senior clubs
- Years: Team
- 1999–2002: Dunaferr SE
- 2002–2005: Tatabánya-Carbonex KC
- 2005–2009: Dunaferr SE
- 2009–2010: JD Arrate
- 2010–2012: SC Pick Szeged
- 2012–2016: Tatabánya-Carbonex KC
- 2016-: TuS Helmlingen
National team
Years	Team	Apps	(Gls)
–	Hungary	88	(169)
- Updated on 12 December 2012

Szabolcs Törő (born 10 March 1983, in Ajka) is a Hungarian handballer who plays for SC Pick Szeged and the Hungarian national team.

The tricky winger participated on three European Championships (2006, 2008, 2010) and represented Hungary on further two World Championships (2009, 2011).

== Achievements ==
- Nemzeti Bajnokság I:
  - Winner: 2000
  - Silver Medalist: 2001, 2011
  - Bronze Medalist: 2002, 2006, 2007, 2008, 2009
- Magyar Kupa:
  - Winner: 2001
  - Finalist: 2007, 2012
- EHF Cup Winners' Cup:
  - Semifinalist: 2002
