= Kornél Nagy =

Hungarian handball player (born 1986)

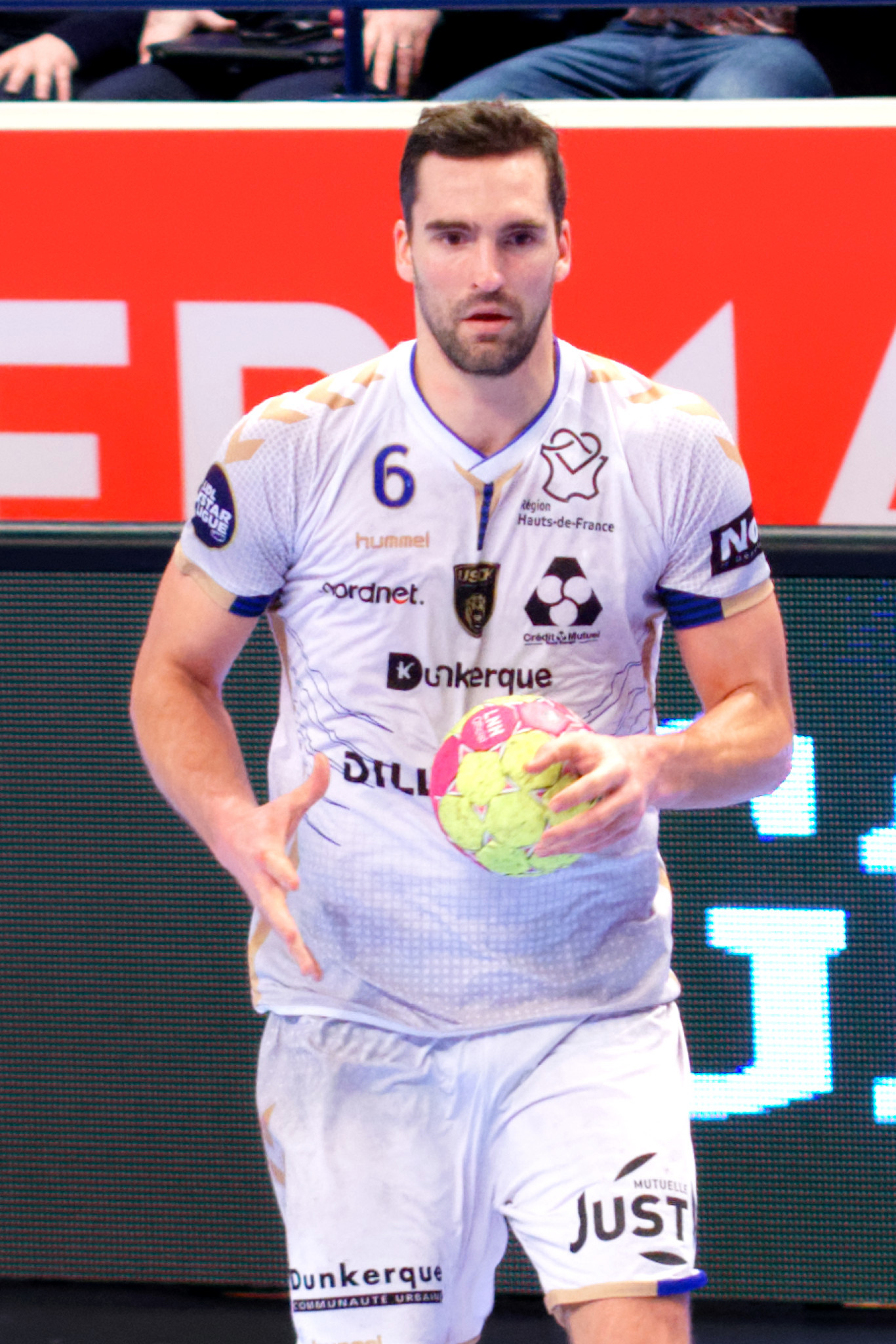

Personal information
- Nationality: Hungarian
- Born: 21 November 1986 (age 39) Püspökladány, Hungary
- Height: 1.95 m (6 ft 5 in)

Sport
- Sport: Handball
- Position: Left back
- Current club: Retired
- Number: 6

Senior clubs
- Years: Team
- 2002–2005: Békési FKC
- 2005–2010: Dunaferr SE
- 2010–2011: MKB Veszprém KC
- 2011–2024: US Dunkerque HB
National team
Years	Team	Apps	(Gls)
2006–2016	Hungary	131	(213)
Medal record
Junior World Championship
Bronze medal – third place	2005 Hungary

Kornél Nagy (born 21 November 1986) is a Hungarian former handball player who played the Hungarian national team.

He participated in five European Championships (2008, 2010, 2012, 2014, 2016) and three World Championships (2007, 2011, 2013).

== Club career ==
From 2002 to 2005 he played for Békési FKC. He then joined Dunaferr SE, where he played until 2010. He then joined MKB Veszprém KC, where he won the Hungarian Championship and Cup in his single season at the club. In 2011 he joined US Dunkerque HB in France. Here he won the 2012 French Supercup, the 2013 French League Cup and the 2014 French championship. In 2012 he reached the final of the EHF Cup, where he lost to German club Frisch Auf Göppingen. He retired in 2024 He played 331 matches for the Dunkerque, scoring 1018 goals.

== Achievements ==
- Nemzeti Bajnokság I:
  - Winner: 2011
  - Bronze Medalist: 2006, 2007, 2008, 2009
- Nemzeti Bajnokság I/B:
  - Winner: 2005
- France Handball League:
  - Winner: 2014
- Magyar Kupa:
  - Winner: 2011
- Coupe de la Ligue:
  - Winner: 2013
- EHF Cup:
  - Finalist: 2012
- Junior World Championship:
  - Bronze Medalist: 2005

== Individual awards ==
- Nemzeti Bajnokság I Top Scorer: 2010
- Junior Prima Award: 2010
- LNH Player of the Month: December 2011
