= József Kemény =

Hungarian historian, archaeologist and art collector

Kemény József
- Born: 11 September 1795; Gerend, Principality of Transylvania
- Died: 12 September 1855 (at the age of 60); Gerend, Austrian Empire
- Occupations: historian, archaeologist, writer, heraldist, collector
- Notable work: História, ritus et progressus regii in Transilvania gubernii

Count József Kemény de Magyargyerőmonostor (Hungarian: magyargyerőmonostori gróf Kemény József; 11 September 1795 – 12 September 1855) was a Hungarian historian, archaeologist and art collector, and a member of the Hungarian Academy of Sciences, the Imperial Academy of Vienna, and the Academy of Paris.

== Biography ==
Kemény was born in Gerend in the Principality of Transylvania, a constituent land of the Habsburg monarchy (today part of Luna, Romania) in 1795. He belonged to the branch of the Kemény family that descended from John Kemény, the Prince of Transylvania and the autobiographer. His father was Baron Farkas Kemény, his mother was Countess Teréz Batthyány, sister of the learned Transylvanian bishop Ignác Batthyány. His only sister was Polyxena, she was five years younger than him.

His primary school education continued under the care of his tutor, Ignác Fekete. At the age of ten he entered the grammar school of the Piarists in Kolozsvár (today Cluj-Napoca, Romania) and in 1807, after completing the grammar second class, he remained the first of 44 pupils among the 34 students for a whole year. His eccentric father was raised to the rank of count on 12 August 1808.

After the lyceum he studied at the Law Academy in Kolozsvár from 1812, and in 1814, at his father's request, he entered the civil service. In 1814, he was elected a judge of the Kolozs County Court, but soon moved to the Gubernium seated in Kolozsvár, where he was sworn in as a chancery official on 9 January 1815. In 1818, his father arranged for him to be an apprentice at the Transylvanian Court Chancellery in Vienna, because of his poetry. He fell in love with Anna Láng, the daughter of a Carinthian noble teacher, a 20-year-old girl of rare education, and married her in the autumn of 1821 without his father's knowledge or consent. The hitherto idle Count became a diligent official at the Chancellery.

In 1823, he made the great mistake of his career, which only after a long period of careful work he managed to erase, because during a dispute with a Romanian historian he anonymously sent him two documents that confirmed the Romanian historian's position. When the Romanian historian included these two documents in his book, Kemény laughed at him and revealed that the two letters were forgeries. After this scandal, he did not attempt anything similar, but devoted his life to serious research.

His father's strictness eased somewhat and in 1826 he was allowed to return to Transylvania with his wife and son. He lived for nearly two years in the Altorja (today Turia, Romania) mansion of Baron Lázár Apor until he was reconciled with his father.

He moved to Nagyszeben (today Sibiu, Romania) and in the summer of 1827 became honorary secretary to the treasury. After the death of his father (20 September 1830), he inherited his father's fortune. Shortly afterwards his 12-year-old daughter Malvina died.

In 1830, he wrote five articles in the Scientific Collection about the Romanians of Transylvania, his own family, the deer on the coat of arms of Kemény family, the old Székely poet Szőke Ambrus Gelenczei, and the literature of "the lost children of the city of Hameln and the fable of the origin of the Transylvanian Saxons".

With his own money he built an Orthodox church for the Romanians on his estate.

In 1831, he was given the rank of a Transylvanian treasury secretary. For twenty years he served free of charge in Kolozsvár, Vienna and Nagyszeben, but under the influence of his father, who opposed his marriage, he was not promoted to more than honorary governorate. He disliked official life, and resigned his post in 1834 to devote himself purely to science. Already in Vienna, he devoted himself mainly to research and science. It was at this time that he laid the foundations of his collection of copies of diplomas.

During the Hungarian Revolution of 1848/49, his estate was looted and many valuable works of art were taken from his famous collection.

He was among the first to work on economic history. He collected the relics of the trade and industry of Transylvania and wrote its history in 1833. He was a pioneer in the protection of Hungarian monuments. His work, apart from the initial "joke" forgery scandal, is both authentic and careful, which is why he has been elected a member of many scientific societies. For his merits, he was elected a member of the Hungarian Academy of Sciences in 1831, followed by membership of the Imperial Academy of Vienna and then of the Academy of Paris, among a number of associations at home and abroad. His health was undermined by unremitting work and he died at his castle in Gerend.
