= 2002–03 Nemzeti Bajnokság I (men's handball) =

Nemzeti Bajnokság I
- Season: 2002–03
- Country: Hungary
- Champions: Fotex Veszprém
- Champions League: Fotex Veszprém; Pick Szeged
- EHF Cup: Dunaferr SE; Győri ETO FKC
- Cup Winners' Cup: Csömör KSK

2002–03 Nemzeti Bajnokság I (men's handball) season.

== Team information ==
Location of teams in the 2002–03 Nemzeti Bajnokság I

Team	Location	Arena	Capacity
Békési FKC	Békés	Városi Sportcsarnok	800
Ceglédi KKSE	Cegléd	Városi Sportcsarnok	1,200
Dunaferr SE	Dunaújváros	Dunaferr Sportcsarnok	1,200
Győri ETO FKC	Győr	Magvassy Mihály Sportcsarnok	2,800
Komlói BSK	Komló	Sportközpont	900
Orosházi FKSE	Orosháza	Városi Sportcsarnok	600
Pécsi VSE	Pécs	Lauber Dezső Sportcsarnok	3,000
PLER KC	Budapest	Pestszentimrei Sportkastély	1,000
Pick Szeged	Szeged	Városi Sportcsarnok	3,200
Százhalombattai KE	Százhalombatta	Városi Sportcsarnok	1,200
Tatabánya Carbonex	Tatabánya	Földi Imre Sportcsarnok	1,000
Fotex Veszprém	Veszprém	Városi Sportcsarnok	2,200

== Regular season ==
	Team	Pld	W	D	L	GF	GA	Diff	Pts
1	Pick Szeged	22	21	0	1	704	494	+210	42
2	Fotex Veszprém	22	19	1	2	671	459	+212	39
3	Dunaferr SE	22	17	2	3	616	466	+150	36
4	Ceglédi KKSE	22	10	3	9	527	533	−6	23
5	Győri ETO FKC	22	8	4	10	540	541	−1	20
6	Tatabánya Carbonex	22	9	2	11	566	596	−30	20
7	Pestszentlőrinc-Elektromos	22	7	4	11	544	613	−69	18
8	Százhalombattai KE	22	7	3	12	556	628	−72	17
9	Pécsi VSE	22	7	3	12	496	579	−83	17
10	Orosházi FKSE	22	7	2	13	529	598	−69	16
11	Komlói BSK	22	4	0	18	539	649	−110	8
12	Békési FKC	22	3	2	17	479	611	−132	8

Champion Playoff
Relegation Round

Pld - Played; W - Won; L - Lost; PF - Points for; PA - Points against; Diff - Difference; Pts - Points.

== Playoff ==
	Team	Pld	W	D	L	GF	GA	Pts	Bonus
1	Fotex KC Veszprém	10	9	0	1	325	227	23	5
2	SC Pick Szeged	10	8	0	2	330	239	22	6
3	Dunaferr SE	10	6	1	3	263	249	17	4
4	Győri ETO FKC	10	3	0	7	216	281	8	2
5	Tatabánya Carbonex	10	2	1	7	242	311	6	1
6	Ceglédi KK	10	1	0	9	235	304	5	3

== Relegation Round ==
	Team	Pld	W	D	L	GF	GA	Pts	Bonus
7	Százhalombattai KE	10	6	1	3	263	252	18	5
8	Every Day KSE Orosháza	10	6	1	3	295	273	16	3
9	Pestszentlőrinc-Elektromos	10	3	3	4	276	287	15	6
10	Diacell-Pécsi KK	10	3	2	5	274	287	12	4
11	Békési FKC	10	4	1	5	232	229	10	1
12	Komlói Bányász-Fűtőerőmű	10	3	2	5	251	263	10	2
