= Dunaferr SE (men's handball) =

- Full name: Dunaferr Sportegyesület
- Short name: Dunaferr
- Founded: 1951
- Arena: Dunaferr Sportcsarnok, Dunaújváros
- Capacity: 1,200 seats
- President: Tamás Csapó
- Head coach: László György
- League: Nemzeti Bajnokság I
- 2010–11: Nemzeti Bajnokság I, 12th (relegated)
- Club colours
Home	Away

Dunaferr Sportegyesület was a Hungarian handball club from Dunaújváros, that is part of the multi-sports club running under the same name. The team enjoyed their best spell in the early 2000s, having won the Hungarian Championship in 2000 and the Hungarian Cup in 2001. Beside the domestic success they also reached the finals of the EHF Cup Winners' Cup in 2000 and the semifinals of the EHF Cup three years later.

After February 2011 the official name of the club was Dunaferr Alexandra due to sponsorship reasons. The men's handball division of Dunaferr SE was closed on 1 July 2011.

Location of Dunaferr SE

== Honours ==
=== National ===
Nemzeti Bajnokság I

- Winner (1): 2000
- Runners-up (4): 1997, 1998, 1999, 2001
- Bronze (8): 2002, 2003, 2004, 2005, 2006, 2007, 2008, 2009

Magyar Kupa:

- Winner (1): 2001

=== International ===
- EHF Cup Winners' Cup:
  - Finalists: 2000
  - Semifinalists: 2002
- EHF Cup:
  - Semifinalists: 2003
- EHF Champions Trophy:
  - Semifinalists: 2000

=== Individual awards ===
==== Domestic ====
Nemzeti Bajnokság I Top Scorer

Season	Name	Goals
1990–91	(Hungary) János Wágenbach	
1995–96	(Hungary) Kálmán Fenyő	
1999–2000	(Hungary) Árpád Mohácsi	
2000–01	(Hungary) Árpád Mohácsi	
2005–06	(Serbia) Marko Vujin	
2009–10	(Hungary) Kornél Nagy	

== Kits ==
HOME

1982–83

== Sports Hall information ==
- Name: – Dunaferr Sportcsarnok
- City: – Dunaújváros
- Capacity: – 1200
- Address: – 2400 Dunaújváros, Eszperantó út 2–4.

== Team ==
Squad for the 2010–2011 season

Goalkeepers

- 1 (Hungary) Dániel Repóth
- 2 (Hungary) Zsolt Kovács
- 12 (Hungary) Róbert Kovács

Left Wingers

- 5 (Hungary) István Szepesi
- 6 (Hungary) László Széles
- 19 (Hungary) Zoltán Morva

Right Wingers

- 18 (Hungary) Ákos Pásztor
- 22 (Hungary) Dániel Nagy
- 26 (Hungary) Bence Tárkányi
- 47 (Hungary) Péter Hornyák

Line players

- 4 (Hungary) József Kemény
- 11 (Hungary) Mohamed Yassine Benmiloud
- 14 (Hungary) Antal Muhl
- 24 (Hungary) Tibor Szabó

Left Backs

- 8 (Hungary) Richárd Bali
- 9 (Hungary) Richárd Bodó
- 17 (Hungary) Gábor Hajdú

Central Backs

- 7 (Hungary) Gábor Zubai
- 13 (Russia) Vladimir Kuzmichev
- 23 (Hungary) Bence Takács

Right Backs

- 15 (Hungary) Gábor Németh
- 21 (Hungary) László Kurbély
- 32 (Hungary) Gábor Pulay

=== Transfers ===
Transfers for the 2011–12 season

Joining

Leaving

- (Hungary) József Kemény (LP) (retires)
- (Hungary) Richárd Bodó (LB) (to (Hungary) Grundfos Tatabánya KC)
- (Hungary) Bence Takács (CB) (to (Hungary) Grundfos Tatabánya KC)
- (Hungary) Ákos Pásztor (RW) (to (Hungary) Grundfos Tatabánya KC)
- (Hungary) Zoltán Morva (LW) (to (Hungary) Mezőkövesdi KC)
- (Hungary) Tibor Szabó (LP) (to (Hungary) Mezőkövesdi KC)
- (Hungary) Richárd Bali (LB) (to (Hungary) Orosházi FKSE)
- (Russia) Vladimir Kuzmichev (CB) (to (Hungary) Balatonfüredi KSE)
- (Hungary) Gábor Pulay (RB) (to (Hungary) Balatonfüredi KSE)
- (Hungary) Péter Hornyák (RW) (to (Hungary) Balatonfüredi KSE)
- (Hungary) Bence Tárkányi (RW) (to (Hungary) Balatonfüredi KSE)
- (Hungary) Dániel Nagy (RW) (to (Hungary) Balatonfüredi KSE)
- (Hungary) Mohamed Yassine Benmiloud (LP) (to (Hungary) Balatonfüredi KSE)
- (Hungary) Gábor Hajdú (LB) (to (Hungary) PLER KC)
- (Hungary) László Kurbély (RB) (to (Hungary) Pécsi VSE)
- (Hungary) István Szepesi (LW) (to (Hungary) Pécsi VSE)
- (Hungary) László Széles (LW) (to (Hungary) Csurgói KK)
- (Hungary) Dániel Repóth (GK) (to (Hungary) DVTK-Eger)
- (Hungary) Antal Muhl (LP) (to (Hungary) Mizse KC)
- (Hungary) Gábor Németh (RB) (to (Hungary) ETO - SZESE Győr FKC)
- (Hungary) Zsolt Kovács (GK) (to (Hungary) Hajdúnánás KSE)
- (Hungary) Róbert Kovács (GK) (to ?)
- (Hungary) Gábor Zubai (CB) (to ?)

== List of the 2000 Hungarian champion team ==
Number	Player	Position	Birth Date	Height (m)
1	(Lithuania) Arunas Vaskevicius	Goalkeeper	3/8/1973	1.93
3	(Hungary) (Russia) Szergej Kuzmicsov	Central Back	10/6/1967	1.90
4	(Hungary) József Kemény	Line Player	28/2/1971	1.87
5	(Hungary) Tamás Bene	Left winger	16/7/1973	1.93
6	(Hungary) Gábor Décsi	Left back	3/3/1974	1.97
7	(Hungary) Gyula Gál	Line Player	18/8/1976	1.94
9	(Hungary) Miklós Rosta	Line Player	31/7/1969	1.95
10	(Hungary) Balázs Kertész	Right winger	3/2/1970	1.85
12	(Hungary) Tamás Zsembery	Goalkeeper	15/3/1967	1.82
13	(Lithuania) Julius Marcinkevicius	Left back	25/8/1976	1.95
14	(Hungary) László Marosi	Left winger	26/11/1962	1.87
15	(Hungary) Csaba Tombor	Right winger	14/4/1979	1.88
16	(Cuba) (Hungary) Vladimir Rivero Hernandez	Goalkeeper	22/1/1971	1.96
17	(Hungary) Viktor Károlyfi	Central Back	10/6/1975	1.89
19	(Hungary) Tamás Mocsai	Right back	9/12/1978	1.96
20	(Hungary) Edmond Tóth	Right back	6/5/1975	1.87

=== Technical and managerial staff ===
Job	Name
Head coach	(Hungary) László Skaliczki

== Retired numbers ==
- 3 (Hungary) (Russia) Szergej Kuzmicsov, Central Back

== Former club members ==
=== Notable former players ===
- (Hungary) Gábor Ancsin
- (Hungary) Sándor Bajusz
- (Hungary) Dávid Bakos
- (Hungary) Tamás Bene
- (Hungary) Mohamed Yassine Benmiloud
- (Hungary) Richárd Bodó
- (Hungary) Gábor Császár
- (Hungary) Gábor Décsi
- (Hungary) János Dénes
- (Hungary) Nándor Fazekas
- (Hungary) Gyula Gál
- (Hungary) Gábor Grebenár
- (Hungary) Péter Gúnya
- (Hungary) Péter Hornyák
- (Hungary) Tamás Iváncsik
- (Hungary) Viktor Károlyfi
- (Hungary) Dávid Katzirz
- (Hungary) József Kemény
- (Hungary) Balázs Kertész
- (Hungary) (Serbia) Milorad Krivokapić
- (Hungary) (Russia) Szergej Kuzmicsov
- (Hungary) László Marosi
- (Hungary) Roland Mikler
- (Hungary) Zoltán Miss
- (Hungary) Tamás Mocsai
- (Hungary) Kornél Nagy
- (Hungary) Ákos Pásztor
- (Hungary) Miklós Rosta
- (Hungary) Ákos Sándor
- (Hungary) Gábor Szalafai
- (Hungary) János Szathmári
- (Hungary) István Szepesi
- (Hungary) Bence Takács
- (Hungary) Csaba Tombor
- (Hungary) Edmond Tóth
- (Hungary) József Tóth
- (Hungary) Szabolcs Törő
- (Hungary) Szabolcs Zubai
- (Hungary) Tamás Zsembery
- (Austria) Janko Božović
- (Bosnia and Herzegovina) Sasa Djukic
- (Croatia) (Qatar) Marko Bagarić
- (Cuba) (Hungary) Vladimir Rivero Hernandez
- (Lithuania) Julius Marcinkevicius
- (Lithuania) Arunas Vaskevicius
- (Russia) Oleg Grebnev
- (Serbia) Milos Padezanin
- (Serbia) Marko Vujin
- (Slovakia) Marian Kleis
- (Slovakia) Michal Kopčo
- (Slovakia) Peter Kukučka
- (Slovakia) Matus Mino
- (Slovakia) Richard Štochl

=== In European competition ===
R3: Round 3 / R4: Round 4
GM: Group Matches / 1/8: Last 16 / 1/4: Quarter Final / 1/2: Semi Final / F: Final

==== EHF Champions League ====
Season	Round	Club	Home	Away	Aggregate
2000–01	GM (Group B)	(Spain) FC Barcelona	22–22	26–30	3rd
2000–01	GM (Group B)	(France) Montpellier HB	27–25	22–30	3rd
2000–01	GM (Group B)	(Poland) Wybrzeże Gdańsk	21–17	25–21	3rd

==== EHF Cup Winners' Cup (defunct) ====
Season	Round	Club	Home	Away	Aggregate
1999-00	1/16	(Israel) Maccabi Ra'anana	29–15	23–23	52–38
1999-00	1/8	(Austria) PTA Wien	36–21	27–19	63–40
1999-00	1/4	(Germany) TBV Lemgo	23–16	23–26	46–42
1999-00	1/2	(Denmark) Kolding IF	28–22	22–19	50–41
1999-00	F	(Spain) Portland San Antonio	26–20	19–28	45–48
2001–02	R3	(Netherlands) Primaz Sittardia	26–16	28–17	54–33
2001–02	R4	(Sweden) IF Guif Eskilstuna	24–13	26–18	50–31
2001–02	1/4	(Portugal) F.C. do Porto	25–15	19–29	44–44 (a)
2001–02	1/2	(Germany) SG Flensburg-Handewitt	21–22	21–25	42–47
2008–09	R3	(Hungary) PLER KC	29–26	32–30	61–56
2008–09	1/8	(Hungary) Pick Szeged	33–22	19–28	52–57

==== EHF Cup ====
Season	Round	Club	Home	Away	Aggregate
1997–98	1/16	(Luxembourg) Fraternelle Esch	37–16	38–24	75–40
1997–98	1/8	(Germany) THW Kiel	24–23	21–26	45–49
1998–99	1/16	(Switzerland) TV Suhr-Handball	23–20	16–27	39–47
2002–03	R2	(Georgia (country)) S.T.U. Shevardeni Tbilisi	34–11	33–22	67–33
2002–03	R3	(Federal Republic of Yugoslavia) Partizan Belgrad	31–23	25–26	56–49
2002–03	R4	(Federal Republic of Yugoslavia) RK Sintelon	27–19	24–22	51–41
2002–03	1/4	(Switzerland) Pfadi Winterthur	28–26	27–24	55–50
2002–03	1/2	(Russia) Lukoil-Dynamo Astrakhan	27–30	25–23	52–53
2003–04	R3	Cyprus College	42–21	40–17	82–38
2003–04	1/8	(Spain) CB Valencia	29–25	32–22	61–47
2003–04	1/4	(Russia) Lukoil-Dynamo Astrakhan	30–32	27–36	57–68
2004–05	R3	(Slovenia) RK Cimos Koper	39–25	32–39	71–64
2004–05	1/8	(Poland) WKS Śląsk Wrocław	38–30	33–22	71–52
2004–05	1/4	(Germany) VfL Gummersbach	35–30	21–30	56–60
2005–06	R3	(Turkey) Beşiktaş İstanbul	34–31	24–30	58–61
2006–07	R3	(Portugal) Madeira Andebol SAD	31–24	27–30	58–54
2006–07	1/8	(Spain) CAI BM. Aragón	35–25	21–33	56–58
2007–08	R3	(Romania) Dinamo Baumit Bucureșt	32–22	36–27	68–49
2007–08	1/8	(Spain) CAI BM. Aragón	29–30	24–36	53–66
2009–10	R3	(Slovakia) TATRAN Prešov	23–22	19–27	42–49
2010–11	R3	(Portugal) FC Porto/Vitalis	27–37	22–36	49–73
