= Nemzeti Bajnokság I (men's handball) =

Hungarian sports league

K&H férfi kézilabda liga
- Current season, competition or edition: 2025–26 Nemzeti Bajnokság I (men's handball)
- Sport: Handball
- Founded: 1951; 75 years ago
- No. of teams: 14 (since 2016–17)
- Country: Hungary
- Confederation: EHF
- Most recent champion: Veszprém KC (30th title)
- Most titles: Veszprém KC (30 titles)
- Broadcaster: M4 Sport
- Relegation to: Nemzeti Bajnokság I/B
- Domestic cup: Magyar Kupa
- International cups: EHF Champions League; EHF European League; EHF European Cup
- Website: keziszovetseg.hu

The Nemzeti Bajnokság I (English: National Championship I, commonly abbreviated NB I) is the premier men's professional handball league in Hungary, administered by the Hungarian Handball Federation. Since 2016 the official name of the championship is K&H Férfi Kézilabda Liga due to sponsorship reasons.

== Overview ==
Running since 1951, the Hungarian championship is among the strongests in Europe. Veszprém KC have won the EHF Cup Winners' Cup in 2008 and have reached the semi-final of the EHF Champions League three times in the last nine seasons, capturing a silver medal in 2002. Main domestic rivals SC Pick Szeged are also regular members of the Champions League.

Famous handball players who have played in the league include Carlos Pérez, Zlatko Saračević, Mirza Džomba, Árpád Sterbik, Kiril Lazarov, László Nagy, Dániel Buday, Balázs Laluska, József Éles, Julio Fis, Rolando Uríos, Nenad Peruničić, Vlado Šola, Dejan Perić, Vladimir Hernández, Gergő Iváncsik and many others.

Currently, it consists of 14 teams. The top four teams after the regular season qualify for the playoffs, where a best-of-three system is used. Teams ranked fifth to ninth and tenth to twelfth decide their final places in a classification round, using a double round robin system, playing six additional rounds. Depending on their final position in the regular season, they are awarded bonus points which are added to the points they earn in the postseason.

According to the EHF league ranking, NB I champions and runners-up receive an automatic spot in the Group phase of the forthcoming Champions League season, while following two clubs enter the EHF Cup. Teams ranked thirteenth and fourteenth get relegated and will be replaced by the winners of the Eastern and Western group of the second division.

== Current season ==
=== Teams for season 2023–24 ===
Location of teams in 2023–24 Nemzeti Bajnokság I

Team	Location	Arena	Capacity	Finished pos. in last season	Seasons in top division	Top division titles
Balatonfüredi KSE	Balatonfüred	Balaton Szabadidő és Konferencia Központ	712	5th	17	0
Budakalász FKC	Budakalász	Budakalászi Sportcsarnok	400	10th	8	0
Csurgói KK	Csurgó	Sótonyi László Sportcsarnok	1200	6th	16	0
Dabas KK	Dabas	OBO Aréna	1920	9th	7	0
QHB-Eger	Eger	Kemény Ferenc Sportcsarnok	885	1st (in Nemzeti Bajnokság I/B)	8	0
Ferencvárosi TC	Budapest, IX. ker	Elek Gyula Aréna	1300	4th	11	0
HE-DO B. Braun Gyöngyös	Gyöngyös	Dr. Fejes András Sport- és Rendezvénycsarnok	1500	7th	17	0
PLER-Budapest	Budapest, XVIII. ker	Budapest Airport Aréna	1000	2nd (in Nemzeti Bajnokság I/B)	18	0
MOL Tatabánya KC	Tatabánya	Tatabányai Multifunkcionális Sportcsarnok	6200	3rd place, bronze medalist(s)	51	4
Carbonex-Komló	Komló	Komló Városi Sportközpont	800	11th	26	0
NEKA	Balatonboglár	NEKA Sportcsarnok	678	8th	3	0
OTP Bank - Pick Szeged	Szeged	Pick Aréna	8143	2nd place, silver medalist(s)	48	5
Fejér B.Á.L. Veszprém	Veszprém	Március 15. úti Sportcsarnok	2200	12th	4	0
Telekom Veszprém KC	Veszprém	Veszprém Aréna	5096	1st place, gold medalist(s)	43	26

== Sponsorship ==
The league went through various name changes depending on the sponsor for the given season(s):

- –2002: No sponsor
- 2002–2012: Budapest Bank (Budapest Bank Kézilabda Liga)
- 2012–2016: No sponsor (Nemzeti Bajnokság I - NB I)
- 2016– : K&H Bank (K&H liga)

== Format ==
As we can see from the chart the number of teams in the Hungarian First Division changed a lot and continuously. The league started in 1951 with four teams and with the formation of teams the league expanded continuously. Currently, there are 14 teams in the first division.

Season	Number of teams
from 1951 to 1952	4 teams
in 1953	6 teams
in 1954	12 team
from 1955 to 1956	4 teams
in 1957	12 teams
from 1958 to 1959	14 teams
from 1960 to 1964	12 teams
from 1965 to 1975	14 teams
from 1976 to 1982	12 teams
from 1983 to 1990-91	14 teams
from 1991-92 to 1994-95	16 teams
from 1995-96 to 1998-99	14 teams
from 1999-00 to 2006-07	12 teams
in 2007-08	16 teams
in 2008-09	12 teams
from 2009-10 to 2010-11	13 teams
from 2011-12 to 2014-15	12 teams
from 2015-16 to present	14 teams

== Title holders ==
- 1951 : Vörös Meteor
- 1952 : Honvéd
- 1953 : Újpest
- 1954 : Vörös Meteor
- 1955 : Vörös Meteor
- 1956 : Vörös Meteor, Bp. Kinizsi
- 1957 : Vörös Meteor
- 1958 : Újpest
- 1959 : Bp. Spartacus
- 1960 : Bp. Spartacus
- 1961 : Bp. Spartacus
- 1962 : Bp. Spartacus
- 1963 : Bp. Honvéd
- 1964 : Bp. Honvéd
- 1965 : Bp. Honvéd
- 1966 : Bp. Honvéd
- 1967 : Bp. Honvéd
- 1968 : Bp. Honvéd
- 1969 : Elektromos SE
- 1970 : Elektromos SE
- 1971 : Elektromos SE
- 1972 : Bp. Honvéd
- 1973 : Bp. Spartacus
- 1974 : Tatabánya
- 1975 : Debreceni Dózsa
- 1976 : Bp. Honvéd
- 1977 : Bp. Honvéd
- 1978 : Tatabányai Bányász
- 1979 : Tatabányai Bányász
- 1980 : Bp. Honvéd
- 1981 : Bp. Honvéd
- 1982 : Bp. Honvéd
- 1983 : Bp. Honvéd
- 1984 : Tatabányai Bányász
- 1985 : Veszprém
- 1986 : Veszprém
- 1987 : Győri ETO
- 1988/89 : Győri ETO
- 1989/90 : Győri ETO
- 1990/91 : Elektromos SE
- 1991/92 : Veszprém
- 1992/93 : Veszprém
- 1993/94 : Veszprém
- 1994/95 : Veszprém
- 1995/96 : Szeged
- 1996/97 : Veszprém
- 1997/98 : Veszprém
- 1998/99 : Veszprém
- 1999/00 : Dunaferr
- 2000/01 : Veszprém
- 2001/02 : Veszprém
- 2002/03 : Veszprém
- 2003/04 : Veszprém
- 2004/05 : Veszprém
- 2005/06 : Veszprém
- 2006/07 : Szeged
- 2007/08 : Veszprém
- 2008/09 : Veszprém
- 2009/10 : Veszprém
- 2010/11 : Veszprém
- 2011/12 : Veszprém
- 2012/13 : Veszprém
- 2013/14 : Veszprém
- 2014/15 : Veszprém
- 2015/16 : Veszprém
- 2016/17 : Veszprém
- 2017/18 : Szeged
- 2018/19 : Veszprém
- 2019/20 : Not awarded due to COVID-19 pandemic
- 2020/21 : Szeged
- 2021/22 : Szeged
- 2022/23 : Veszprém
- 2023/24 : Veszprém
- 2024/25 : Veszprém
- 2025/26 : Veszprém
- 2026/27 : TBD

== Performances ==
=== By club ===
Club	Winners	Runners-up	Third place	Winning years
Veszprém	**30**	12	2	1985, 1986, 1992, 1993, 1994, 1995, 1997, 1998, 1999, 2001, 2002, 2003, 2004, 2005, 2006, 2008, 2009, 2010, 2011, 2012, 2013, 2014, 2015, 2016, 2017, 2019, 2023, 2024, 2025, 2026
Bp. Honvéd	**14**	7	4	1952, 1963, 1964, 1965, 1966, 1967, 1968, 1972, 1976, 1977, 1980, 1981, 1982, 1983
Szeged	**5**	22	11	1996, 2007, 2018, 2021, 2022
Bp. Spartacus	**5**	5	4	1959, 1960, 1961, 1962, 1973
Vörös Meteor	**5**	2	2	1951, 1954, 1955, 1956, 1957
Elektromos SE	**4**	6	4	1969, 1970, 1971, 1991
Tatabánya	**4**	3	9	1974, 1978, 1979, 1984
Győri ETO	**3**	3	4	1987, 1989, 1990
Újpest	**2**	3	1	1953, 1958
Dunaferr	**1**	4	8	2000
Ferencváros	**1**	3	4	1956
Debreceni Dózsa	**1**	1	2	1975
Győri Textiles	-	1	2	-
Csepel	-	1	1	-
Vörös Lobogó	-	-	2	-
Testnevelési Főiskola	-	-	2	-
Balatonfüred	-	-	2	-
Bp. Építők	-	-	1 + (1)	-
Martfűi MSE	-	-	1	-
Vasas	-	-	1	-
Honvéd Szondi SE	-	-	1	-
Csurgó	-	-	1	-

=== By counties ===
The following table lists the Hungarian handball champions by counties of Hungary.

County (megye)	Titles	Winning clubs
Veszprém	30	**Telekom Veszprém** (30)
Budapest	29	Honvéd (14); Bp. Spartacus (5); Elektromos SE (4); Vörös Meteor (4); Újpest (2)
Csongrád-Csanád	5	**Pick Szeged** (5)
Komárom-Esztergom	4	**Tatabánya KC** (4)
Győr-Moson-Sopron	3	Győri ETO (3)
Hajdú-Bihar	1	Debreceni Dózsa (1)
Fejér	1	Dunaferr (1)

- The bolded teams are currently playing in the 2022–23 season of the Hungarian League.

== Clubs ==
Since 1951, clubs have participated in the Hungarian League. The club with the most appearances in the top league is PLER with 58. This record also includes participations of Elektromos SE and Malév SC Pestszenlőrinc, which merged to form PLER. The current NBI team with the most participations is Tatabánya with 54, as of the 2023–24 season. Ferencváros is the team that has participated the most seasons, 43, without ever winning the title.

== Statistics ==
=== EHF coefficients ===
The following data indicates Hungarian coefficient rankings between European handball leagues.

View source data.

Country ranking

EHF League Ranking for 2018/19 season:

- 1. (1) (Germany) Handball-Bundesliga (128.50)
- 2. (2) (Spain) Liga ASOBAL (115)
- 3. (3) (Hungary) Nemzeti Bajnokság I (106.83)
- 4. (4) (France) LNH Division 1 (105.83)
- 5. (5) (Poland) Polish Superliga (75.71)

Club ranking

EHF Club Ranking as of 25 September 2025:

- 4. Veszprém (519)
- 13. Szeged (417)
- 41. Ferencvárosi (110)
- 45. Tatabánya (103)
- 99. Balatonfüred (43)

=== In European competitions ===
	Champions League				EHF Cup				Challenge Cup			Cup Winners' Cup (defunct)			
	C		RU	SF	C		RU	SF	C	RU	SF	C		RU	SF
Honvéd	1	1982	1	3	0		0	0	0	0	0	0		0	0
Veszprém	0		3	3	1		0	0	0	0	0	2	1992, 2008	2	3
Szeged	0		0	0	1	2014	0	0	0	0	1	0		0	3
Győri ETO	0		0	0	1	1986	0	0	0	0	0	0		0	0
Dunaferr	0		0	0	0		0	1	0	0	0	0		1	1
Tatabánya	0		0	0	0		0	0	0	0	0	0		0	1
TOTAL	1 title		4	6	3 title		0	1	0	0	1	2 title		3	8

== See also ==
- Nemzeti Bajnokság I Top Scorers
- Magyar Kupa (National Cup of Hungary)
- Hungarian handball clubs in European competitions
- Hungarian Handballer of the Year
