= Ferenc Ilyés =

Romanian handball player (born 1981)

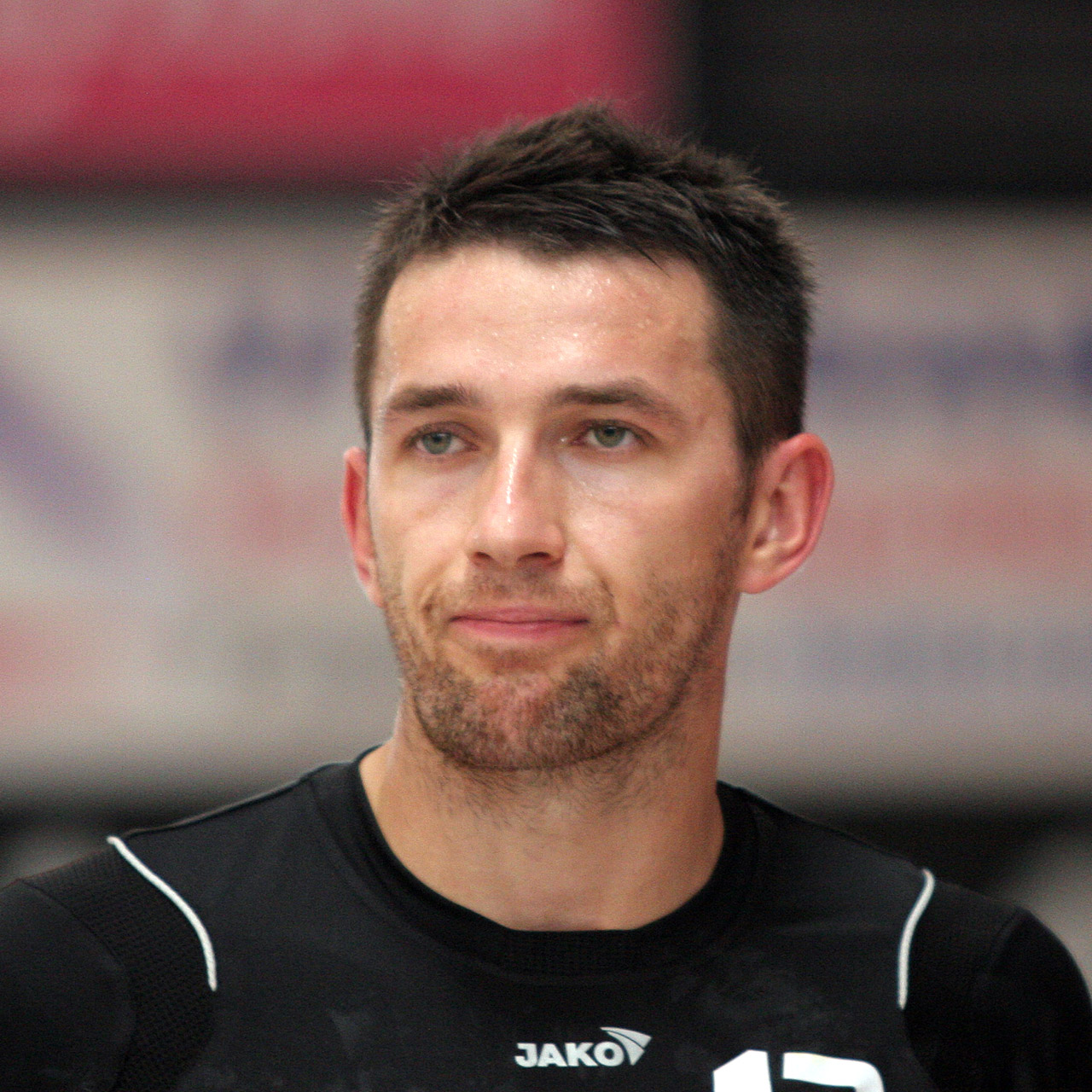

Personal information
- Nationality: Romanian
- Born: 20 December 1981 (age 44) Odorheiu Secuiesc, Romania
- Height: 1.98 m (6 ft 6 in)

Sport
- Sport: Handball
- Position: Left back
- Current club: Retired

Youth career
- Years: Team
- 1995–2000: (Romania) HC Odorheiu Secuiesc

Senior clubs
- Years: Team
- 2000–2007: (Hungary) Pick Szeged
- 2001–2002: → (Hungary) Makói KC (loan)
- 2007–2009: (Hungary) MKB Veszprém KC
- 2009–2011: (Germany) TBV Lemgo
- 2011–2012: (Hungary) MKB Veszprém KC
- 2012–2013: (Poland) Wisła Płock
- 2013–2016: (Hungary) MOL-Pick Szeged
- 2016–2021: (Hungary) Grundfos Tatabánya KC
National team
Years	Team	Apps	(Gls)
2003–2019	Hungary	229	(502)

Ferenc Ilyés (born 20 December 1981) is a retired Hungarian handball player.

== Career ==
=== Club ===
Born in Odorheiu Secuiesc into an ethnic Hungarian family, Ilyés started to play handball for his hometown club. He was spotted by the scouts of SC Pick Szeged, and the talented left back signed a contract with the Tisza-side team in 2000. His playing minutes were limited in the early times, so he moved to Makói KC on loan to get more experience. He returned to Szeged as a more mature player and immediately became a regular team member. He played in Szeged until 2007, when he switched to domestic rivals MKB Veszprém KC. With them he has won the EHF Cup Winners' Cup in 2008. After his contract ran out in 2009, he moved to Bundesliga outfit TBV Lemgo on a two-year deal. He took the EHF Cup title with the German team in 2010, after beating Kadetten Schaffhausen in the finals. On 14 January 2011 it was announced that Ilyés signed a three-year contract with his former club, Veszprém, and will re-join the record champions in the summer. However, a year later he was certified for the Polish team Wisła Płock. From the 2013/14 season, he played again in the colors of SC Pick Szeged, with which he won the EHF Cup in 2014. Joined the Grundfos Tatabánya KC in the summer of 2016. He retired from Grundfos Tatabánya KC in the summer of 2021 and became manager of the club. Grundfos Tatabánya KC retired the 18th field number of Ilyés.

=== International ===
He made his debut in the Hungarian national team on 27 December 2003 against the Czech Republic. His first major tournament was the 2004 European Championship in Slovenia. He participated on another five European Championships (2006, 2008, 2010, 2012, 2014) and was also present on four World Championships (2007, 2009, 2011, 2019). His best result on international level is a fourth place, which he achieved at the 2004 Summer Olympics and at the 2012 Summer Olympics. He was the captain of national team between 2011 and 2019.

=== Personal life ===
His sister is the former international handball player Annamária Ilyés; their mother Magdalena Mikloș represented Romania in the same sport.

== Honours ==
=== Club ===
Pick Szeged

- EHF Cup
  - Gold: 2014
- Nemzeti Bajnokság I
  - Gold: 2007
  - Silver: 2002, 2003, 2004, 2005, 2006, 2014, 2015, 2016
  - Bronze: 2001
- Magyar Kupa
  - Gold: 2006
  - Silver: 2002, 2003, 2004, 2005, 2014, 2015, 2016

MKB Veszprém KC

- EHF Cup Winners' Cup
  - Gold: 2008
- EHF Champions Trophy
  - Silver: 2008
- Nemzeti Bajnokság I
  - Gold: 2008, 2009, 2012
- Magyar Kupa
  - Gold: 2009, 2012
  - Silver: 2008

TBV Lemgo

- EHF Cup
  - Gold: 2010

Wisła Płock

- Superliga
  - Silver: 2013
- Polish Cup
  - Silver: 2013

Grundfos Tatabánya KC

- Nemzeti Bajnokság I
  - Bronze: 2017, 2018, 2019, 2021
- Magyar Kupa
  - Bronze: 2017

=== Individual ===
- Golden Cross of the Cross of Merit of the Republic of Hungary (2012)
- Hungarian Best Defensive Player Of The Year: 2008, 2010, 2011, 2014, 2018
