= 2014–15 Magyar Kupa (men's handball) =

57th Hungarian men's handball competition

Tournament details
- Country: Hungary

Final positions
- Champions: MKB-MVM Veszprém (24th title)
- Runners-up: MOL-Pick Szeged

The 2014–15 Magyar Kupa, known as (Hungarian: BOMBA! férfi Magyar Kupa) for sponsorship reasons, was the 57th edition of the tournament.

== Final four ==
The final four will be held on 25 and 26 April 2015 at the Lauber Dezső Sportcsarnok in Pécs.

Semi-finals
25 April, 15:45
MKB-MVM Veszprém	28
Mezőkövesdi KC	27
25 April, 18:00
MOL-Pick Szeged	34
Váci KSE	25

Final
26 April, 14:00
MKB-MVM Veszprém	26
MOL-Pick Szeged	22
Third place
26 April, 12:00
Mezőkövesdi KC	30
Váci KSE	21

Semi-finals

25 April; 15:45	MKB-MVM Veszprém	28 – 23	Mezőkövesdi KC	Lauber Dezső Sportcsarnok, Pécs; Attendance: 600; Referees: Janáky, Temesi
25 April; 15:45	Ruesga, Sulić 5	(16–8)	S. Ilić 5	Lauber Dezső Sportcsarnok, Pécs; Attendance: 600; Referees: Janáky, Temesi
25 April; 15:45	2× (yellow card) 6× (suspension)	Report	3× (yellow card) 4× (suspension) 1× (red card)	Lauber Dezső Sportcsarnok, Pécs; Attendance: 600; Referees: Janáky, Temesi

25 April; 18:00	MOL-Pick Szeged	34 – 25	Váci KSE	Lauber Dezső Sportcsarnok, Pécs; Referees: Bacs, Bóna
25 April; 18:00	Prodanović 10	(20–14)	three players 4	Lauber Dezső Sportcsarnok, Pécs; Referees: Bacs, Bóna
25 April; 18:00	2× (yellow card) 4× (suspension)	Report	3× (yellow card) 4× (suspension)	Lauber Dezső Sportcsarnok, Pécs; Referees: Bacs, Bóna

Third place

26 April; 12:00	Mezőkövesdi KC	30 – 21	Váci KSE	Lauber Dezső Sportcsarnok, Pécs; Referees: Horváth, Marton
26 April; 12:00	Lókodi, Radnić 7	(15–11)	Lendvay 6	Lauber Dezső Sportcsarnok, Pécs; Referees: Horváth, Marton
26 April; 12:00	3× (yellow card) 6× (suspension)	Report	2× (yellow card) 2× (suspension)	Lauber Dezső Sportcsarnok, Pécs; Referees: Horváth, Marton

Final

26 April; 14:00	MKB-MVM Veszprém	26 – 22	MOL-Pick Szeged	Lauber Dezső Sportcsarnok, Pécs; Attendance: 3,000; Referees: Dobrovits, Tájok
26 April; 14:00	M. Ilić 6	(12–11)	Källman, Balogh 5	Lauber Dezső Sportcsarnok, Pécs; Attendance: 3,000; Referees: Dobrovits, Tájok
26 April; 14:00	2× (yellow card) 4× (suspension)	Report	2× (yellow card) 2× (suspension) 1× (red card)	Lauber Dezső Sportcsarnok, Pécs; Attendance: 3,000; Referees: Dobrovits, Tájok

2014-15 Magyar Kupa
Winner

MKB-MVM Veszprém
24th Title

Mirko Alilović, Roland Mikler, Iman Dzsamali, Péter Gulyás, Momir Ilić, Gergő Iváncsik, Máté Lékai, Gašper Marguč, László Nagy (c), Andreas Nilsson, Chema Rodríguez, Carlos Ruesga, Timuzsin Schuch, Renato Sulić, Mirsad Terzić, Cristian Ugalde, Christian Zeitz
Head coach
Antonio Carlos Ortega

=== Final standings ===
	Team
	MKB-MVM Veszprém
Silver medal	MOL-Pick Szeged
Bronze medal	Mezőkövesdi KC
	Váci KSE

== See also ==
- 2014–15 Nemzeti Bajnokság I
