= 2014–15 Nemzeti Bajnokság I (men's handball) =

NB I
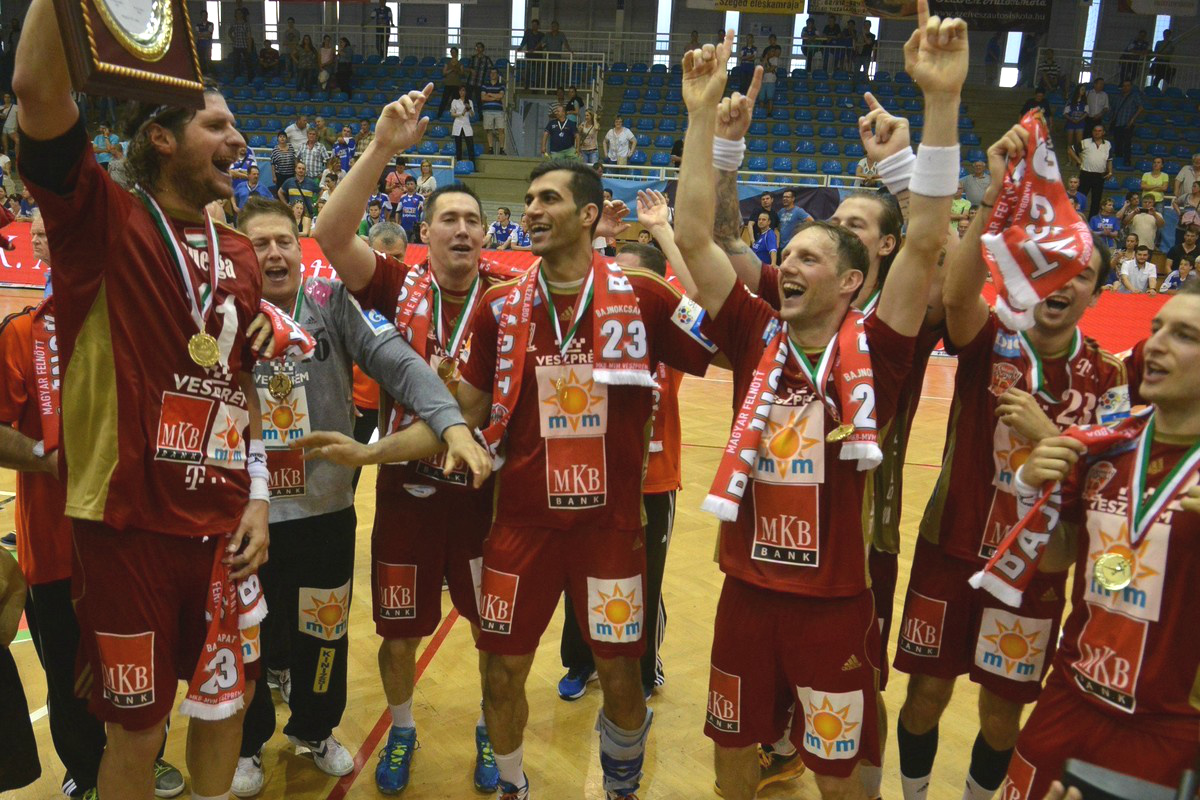
- Veszprém players celebrating their title
- Season: 2014–15
- Champions: MKB-MVM Veszprém (23rd title)
- Relegated: No team relegated
- Champions League: MKB-MVM Veszprém and MOL-Pick Szeged
- EHF Cup: Tatabánya KC and Csurgói KK
- Top goalscorer: Balázs Bertalan Bíró (159)
- Biggest home win: Szeged 47–28 Balmazújv. (20 September 2014)
- Biggest away win: Komlói 15–40 Szeged (9 September 2014)
- Highest scoring: Cegléd 39–33 Komlói (12 September 2014)

The 2014–15 Nemzeti Bajnokság I is the 63rd season of the Nemzeti Bajnokság I, Hungary's premier Handball league.

== Team information ==
Location of teams in 2014-15 Nemzeti Bajnokság I

The following 12 clubs compete in the NB I during the 2014–15 season:

Team	Location	Arena	Capacity
Balatonfüred	Balatonfüred	Észak-Balatoni Reg. Konf. Központ	712
Balmazújváros	Balmazújváros	König Rendezvényközpont	850
Cegléd	Cegléd	Gál József Sportcsarnok	1,200
Csurgó	Csurgó	Sótonyi László Sportcsarnok	800
Gyöngyös	Gyöngyös	Városi Sportcsarnok	1,500
Komlói BSK	Komló	Komlói Sportközpont	800
Mezőkövesd	Mezőkövesd	Városi Sportcsarnok	800
Orosháza	Orosháza	Eötvös Sportcsarnok	600
PLER	Budapest	Lőrinci Sportcsarnok	700
Szeged	Szeged	Újszegedi Sportcsarnok	3,200
Tatabánya	Tatabánya	Földi Imre Sportcsarnok	1,000
Veszprém	Veszprém	Veszprém Aréna	5,096

Team from SEHA League

=== Personnel and kits ===
Following is the list of clubs competing in 2014–15 Nemzeti Bajnokság I, with their president, head coach, kit manufacturer and shirt sponsor.

Team	President	Head coach	Kit manufacturer	Shirt sponsor(s)
Balatonfüred	László Csima	(Hungary) István Csoknyai	Erima	Kinizsi Bank, Sennebogen, 77 Elektronika
Balmazújváros	Sándor Király	(Hungary) Ferenc Füzesi	Erima	König-Trade Kft., Thermal Hotel Balmaz
Cegléd	István Borsos	(Hungary) István Kökény	Erima	—
Csurgó	János Varga	(Hungary) László Sótonyi	hummel	MenDan, Patrik & Varga
Gyöngyös	Zsolt Marczin	(Hungary) István Gulyás	Salming	B. Braun
Komlói BSK	Szabolcs Szigeti	(Montenegro) Ratko Đurković	Zeus	Sport36
Mezőkövesd	Gábor Mikulás	(Hungary) László Skaliczki	Erima	Mezőkövesd Önkormányzata
Orosháza	István Rajki	(Serbia) Vladan Jordović	ASICS	Linamar
PLER	László Németh	(Hungary) István Hutvágner	Erima	HungaroControl, Városgazda XVIII. ker.
Szeged	Nándor Szögi	(Spain) Juan Carlos Pastor	adidas	MOL, Pick, OTP Bank
Tatabánya	László Marosi	(Serbia) Vladan Matić	Jako	Grundfos
Veszprém	Ákos Hunyadfalvy	(Spain) Antonio Carlos Ortega	adidas	MKB Bank, MVM

== Regular season ==
=== Standings ===
	Team	Pld	W	D	L	GF	GA	Diff	Pts
1	MOL-Pick Szeged	20	19	0	1	711	481	+230	38
2	Csurgói KK	20	17	2	1	560	462	+98	36
3	Grundfos-Tatabánya KC	20	14	0	6	486	470	+16	28
4	Balatonfüredi KSE	20	13	1	6	566	483	+83	27
5	Orosházi FKSE-LINAMAR	20	9	1	10	538	547	−9	19
6	B.Braun Gyöngyös	20	8	2	10	542	545	−3	18
7	Mezőkövesdi KC	20	8	1	11	503	533	−30	17
8	Ceglédi KKSE	20	5	1	14	540	607	−67	11
9	PLER Budapest	20	4	1	15	492	578	−86	9
10	Sport36-Komló	20	4	1	15	476	600	−124	9
11	Kőnig-Trade Balmazújváros	20	3	2	15	464	572	−108	8

Championship Round
Relegation Round

Pld - Played; W - Won; D - Drawn; L - Lost; GF - Goals for; GA - Goals against; Diff - Difference; Pts - Points.

=== Schedule and results ===
In the table below the home teams are listed on the left and the away teams along the top.

	Balatonfüredi KSE	Balmazújvárosi KK	Ceglédi KKSE	Csurgói KK	Gyöngyösi KK	Komlói Bányász SK	Mezőkövesdi KC	Orosházi FKSE	PLER KC	SC Pick Szeged	Tatabánya KC
Balatonfüred		37–21	35–21	21–21	27–24	35–20	29–26	33–26	29–18	23–30	26–23
Balmazújváros	18–28		26–26	26–30	25–23	32–25	28–32	21–30	22–22	23–35	16–20
Cegléd	29–25	27–23		25–29	28–37	39–33	25–28	30–32	27–24	27–39	27–33
Csurgó	31–27	26–17	37–28		25–25	30–22	31–22	32–24	29–19	30–27	24–16
Gyöngyös	27–28	28–25	34–23	23–28		32–29	26–29	27–24	33–28	30–41	21–25
Komlói BSK	19–28	27–24	22–21	22–33	23–31		24–24	34–30	29–26	15–40	22–29
Mezőkövesd	24–33	27–22	26–22	18–23	26–25	33–23		28–27	30–33	26–32	24–26
Orosháza	25–23	32–23	32–28	25–27	23–23	26–22	27–20		27–23	25–39	29–26
PLER Budapest	20–32	22–23	25–39	21–27	27–30	36–26	25–24	28–26		25–35	26–28
Szeged	38–26	47–28	43–28	31–23	36–23	27–17	33–21	35–25	36–22		37–22
Tatabánya	22–21	28–21	24–20	23–24	25–20	24–22	19–15	25–23	26–22	22–30	

== Championship round ==
=== Standings ===
	Team	Pld	W	D	L	GF	GA	Diff	Pts	Qualification or relegation
1	MKB-MVM Veszprém	10	10	0	0	333	235	+98	20	Match for the Final
2	MOL-Pick Szeged	10	8	0	2	295	250	+45	16	Match for the Final
3	Grundfos-Tatabánya KC	10	4	1	5	245	267	−22	9	Match for Third place
4	Csurgói KK	10	3	1	6	246	265	−19	7	Match for Third place
5	Balatonfüredi KSE	10	3	0	7	255	278	−23	6	
6	Orosházi FKSE-LINAMAR	10	1	0	9	228	307	−79	2	

Pld - Played; W - Won; D - Drawn; L - Lost; GF - Goals for; GA - Goals against; Diff - Difference; Pts - Points.

==== Schedule and results ====
In the table below the home teams are listed on the left and the away teams along the top.

	Balatonfüredi KSE	Csurgói KK	Orosházi FKSE	SC Pick Szeged	Tatabánya KC	MKB-MVM Veszprém
Balatonfüred		19–22	34–22	25–26	30–24	31–33
Csurgó	31–19		24–20	25–30	30–32	24–35
Orosháza	24–31	23–22		27–32	23–25	25–38
Szeged	34–22	32–28	33–22		33–19	25–31
Tatabánya	23–20	21–21	33–25	22–26		22–27
Veszprém	39–24	34–19	35–17	29–24	32–24	

=== Final ===
1st placed team hosted Games 1 and, plus Game 3 if necessary. 2nd placed team hosted Game 2.

1st placed team	Agg.	2nd placed team	1st leg	2nd leg	3rd leg
MKB-MVM Veszprém	2–0	MOL-Pick Szeged	29–23	31–29	

- 1st leg

16 May; 18:00 (UTC+2)	MKB-MVM Veszprém	29 – 23	MOL-Pick Szeged	Veszprém Aréna, Veszprém; Attendance: 5,000; Referees: Herczeg, Südi
16 May; 18:00 (UTC+2)	Nagy 9	(12–15)	Källman, Robledo 5	Veszprém Aréna, Veszprém; Attendance: 5,000; Referees: Herczeg, Südi
16 May; 18:00 (UTC+2)	2× (yellow card) 3× (suspension)	Report	2× (yellow card) 3× (suspension)	Veszprém Aréna, Veszprém; Attendance: 5,000; Referees: Herczeg, Südi

- 2nd leg

19 May; 18:00 (UTC+2)	MOL-Pick Szeged	29 – 31	MKB-MVM Veszprém	Újszegedi Sportcsarnok, Szeged; Attendance: 3,200; Referees: Herczeg, Südi
19 May; 18:00 (UTC+2)	Källman 6	(10–17)	Ilić 14	Újszegedi Sportcsarnok, Szeged; Attendance: 3,200; Referees: Herczeg, Südi
19 May; 18:00 (UTC+2)	3× (yellow card) 8× (suspension)	Report	2× (yellow card) 11× (suspension) 1× (red card)	Újszegedi Sportcsarnok, Szeged; Attendance: 3,200; Referees: Herczeg, Südi

''MKB-MVM Veszprém won Championship final series 2–0.

NB I 2014–15
Champions

Veszprém
23rd Title

Team roster

- 3 Péter Gulyás (RW)
- 4 Gergő Iváncsik (LW)
- 5 Timuzsin Schuch (P)
- 11 (Spain) Carlos Ruesga (CB)
- 12 Ádám Borbély (GK)
- 13 (Serbia) Momir Ilić (LB)
- 16 Roland Mikler (GK)
- 18 (Sweden) Andreas Nilsson (P)
- 19 László Nagy (RB)
- 20 (Germany) Christian Zeitz (RB)
- 21 (Iran) Iman Jamali (LB)
- 23 (Spain) Cristian Ugalde (LW)
- 24 (Slovenia) Gašper Marguč (RW)
- 25 (Spain) Chema Rodríguez (CB)
- 30 (Bosnia and Herzegovina) Mirsad Terzić (LB)
- 32 (Croatia) Mirko Alilović (GK)
- 33 (Croatia) Renato Sulić (P)
- 66 Máté Lékai (CB)

Head coach: (Spain) Antonio Carlos Ortega

=== Third place ===
3rd placed team hosted Games 1 and, plus Game 3 if necessary. 4th placed team hosted Game 2.

3rd placed team	Agg.	4th placed team	1st leg	2nd leg	3rd leg
Grundfos-Tatabánya KC	2–0	Csurgói KK	24–22	24–23	

== Relegation round ==
=== Standings ===
	Team	Pld	W	D	L	GF	GA	Diff	Pts	Qualification or relegation
7	B.Braun Gyöngyös	30	12	4	14	799	797	+2	28	
8	Mezőkövesdi KC	30	12	2	16	755	796	−41	26	
9	Ceglédi KKSE	30	11	2	17	829	889	−60	24	
10	PLER Budapest	30	8	3	19	740	835	−95	19	
11	Kőnig-Trade Balmazújváros	30	7	5	17	708	810	−102	19	
12	Sport36-Komló	30	6	4	20	723	845	−122	16	

Pld - Played; W - Won; D - Drawn; L - Lost; GF - Goals for; GA - Goals against; Diff - Difference; Pts - Points.

==== Schedule and results ====
In the table below the home teams are listed on the left and the away teams along the top.

	Balmazújvárosi KK	Ceglédi KKSE	Gyöngyösi KK	Komlói Bányász SK	Mezőkövesdi KC	PLER KC
Balmazújváros		32–26	22–19	20–19	26–26	19–19
Cegléd	30–29		33–24	31–29	30–24	26–24
Gyöngyös	27–24	25–25		24–24	24–25	37–21
Komlói BSK	24–24	33–25	23–24		26–23	22–26
Mezőkövesd	22–23	33–32	25–26	26–25		23–22
PLER Budapest	26–25	29–31	30–27	22–22	29–25	

== Season statistics ==
=== Top goalscorers ===
Updated to games played on 24 May 2015.

Rank	Player	Team	Goals
1	(Hungary) Balázs Bertalan Bíró	Ceglédi KKSE	159
2	(Japan) Atsushi Mekaru	Kőnig-Trade Balmazújváros	153
3	(Hungary) Richárd Bodó	Grundfos-Tatabánya KC	148
4	(Serbia) Rajko Prodanović	MOL-Pick Szeged	138
5	(Hungary) Zsolt Balogh	MOL-Pick Szeged	135
6	(Ukraine) Alexander Semikov	Sport36-Komló	130
7	(Hungary) Richárd Bali	Kőnig-Trade Balmazújváros	129
8	(Hungary) Balázs Szőlősi	Balatonfüredi KSE	125
9	(Slovakia) Jakub Mikita	PLER Budapest	120
10	(Montenegro) Ivan Perišić	Ceglédi KKSE	117

=== Number of teams by counties ===
	County (megye)	No. teams	Teams
1	Veszprém	2	Balatonfüred and Veszprém
2	Baranya	1	Komlói BSK
2	Békés	1	Orosháza
2	Borsod-Abaúj-Zemplén	1	Mezőkövesd
2	Budapest	1	PLER
2	Csongrád	1	Szeged
2	Hajdú-Bihar	1	Balmazújváros
2	Heves	1	Gyöngyös
2	Komárom-Esztergom	1	Tatabánya
2	Pest	1	Cegléd
2	Somogy	1	Csurgó

=== NB I clubs in 2014–15 European competitions ===
- MKB-MVM Veszprém

Competition	Round	Club	Home	Away	Aggregate
EHF Champions League	Group C	(Slovenia) Celje	29–26	24–21	1st
EHF Champions League	Group C	(Russia) Ch. Medvedi	38–31	37–32	1st
EHF Champions League	Group C	(France) Montpellier	30–29	34–20	1st
EHF Champions League	Group C	(Germany) RN Löwen	27–24	25–32	1st
EHF Champions League	Group C	(North Macedonia) Vardar	32–24	24–23	1st
EHF Champions League	L16	(Spain) Logroño	37–31	31–23	68–54
EHF Champions League	QF	(France) PSG	34–28	24–24	58–52
EHF Champions League	F4-SF	(Germany) THW Kiel	31–27		
EHF Champions League	F4-F	(Germany) FC Barcelona	23–28		

- MOL-Pick Szeged

Competition	Round	Club	Home	Away	Aggregate
EHF Champions League	Group D	(Denmark) Aalborg	23–23	28–25	2nd
EHF Champions League	Group D	(France) Dunkerque	23–21	25–24	2nd
EHF Champions League	Group D	(Switzerland) Kadetten	34–24	29–32	2nd
EHF Champions League	Group D	(Poland) Kielce	26–27	32–37	2nd
EHF Champions League	Group D	(Ukraine) Motor	27–26	29–25	2nd
EHF Champions League	L16	(Germany) RN Löwen	31–29	34–30	65–59
EHF Champions League	QF	(Germany) THW Kiel	31–29	23–31	54–60

- Balatonfüredi KSE

Competition	Round	Club	Home	Away	Aggregate
EHF Cup	QR2	(Russia) Zaria Kaspija	21–23	25–20	46–43
EHF Cup	QR3	(Austria) HC Hard	26–18	26–31	52–49
EHF Cup	Group D	(Sweden) Eskilstuna Guif	23–25	24–24	4th
EHF Cup	Group D	(Germany) MT Melsungen	24–30	23–29	4th
EHF Cup	Group D	(Croatia) Nexe Našice	19–31	27–26	4th

- Grundfos-Tatabánya KC

Competition	Round	Club	Home	Away	Aggregate
EHF Cup	QR2	(Luxembourg) Handball Esch	24–25	25–25	50–49
EHF Cup	QR3	(Russia) St. Petersburg	23–22	24–32	47–54

- Orosházi FKSE-LINAMAR

Competition	Round	Club	Home	Away	Aggregate
EHF Cup	QR1	(Moldova) Olimpus-85	28–28	34–28	62–56
EHF Cup	QR2	(Belgium) Initia Hasselt	30–21	26–25	56–46
EHF Cup	QR3	(Denmark) Skjern	25–32	20–40	45–72
