= 2016–17 Nemzeti Bajnokság I (men's handball) =

K&H férfi kézilabda liga
- Season: 2016–17
- Champions: Telekom Veszprém (25th title)
- Relegated: Balmazújvárosi KK; Mezőkövesdi KC
- Champions League: Telekom Veszprém; MOL-Pick Szeged
- EHF Cup: Grundfos Tatabánya KC; CYEB Budakalász; Csurgói KK; Balatonfüredi KSE
- Matches: 184
- Goals: 9,596 (52.15 per match)
- Top goalscorer: Mátyás Győri (158 goals)

The 2016–17 Nemzeti Bajnokság I (known as the K&H férfi kézilabda liga for sponsorship reasons) is the 66th season of the Nemzeti Bajnokság I, Hungarian premier Handball league.

== Team information ==
Location of teams in 2016-17 Nemzeti Bajnokság I

The following 14 clubs compete in the NB I during the 2016–17 season:

Team	Location	Arena	Capacity
Balatonfüredi KSE	Balatonfüred	Balatonfüredi Szabadidőközpont	712
Balmazújvárosi KK	Balmazújváros	Kőnig Rendezvényközpont	880
Budakalász FKC	Budakalász	Budakalászi Sportcsarnok	400
Ceglédi KKSE	Cegléd	Gál József Sportcsarnok	1,046
Csurgói KK	Csurgó	Sótonyi László Sportcsarnok	1,200
Eger-Eszterházy SzSE	Eger	Kemény Ferenc Sportcsarnok	875
Gyöngyösi KK	Gyöngyös	Dr. Fejes András Sportcsarnok	1,500
Komlói BSK	Komló	Komlói Sportközpont	800
Mezőkövesdi KC	Mezőkövesd	Városi Sportcsarnok	850
Orosházi FKSE	Orosháza	Eötvös Sportcsarnok	900
SC Pick Szeged	Szeged	Újszegedi Sportcsarnok	3,200
Tatabánya KC	Tatabánya	Földi Imre Sportcsarnok	1,000
Váci KSE	Vác	Városi Sportcsarnok	800
Veszprém KC	Veszprém	Veszprém Aréna	5,096

=== Personnel and kits ===
Following is the list of clubs competing in 2016–17 Nemzeti Bajnokság I, with their president, head coach, kit manufacturer and shirt sponsor.

Team	President	Head coach	Kit manufacturer	Shirt sponsor(s)
Balatonfüred	László Csima	(Hungary) István Csoknyai	Erima	tippmixPro^{1}, Sennebogen, 77 Elektronika, Kinizsi Bank
Balmazújváros	Sándor Király	(Hungary) Tamás Tréki	adidas	tippmixPro^{1}, König-Trade Kft., Thermal Hotel Balmaz
Budakalász	Gábor Hajdu	(Hungary) Attila Horváth	adidas	Swietelsky, tippmixPro^{1}
Cegléd	István Borsos	(Hungary) István Kökény	Erima	tippmixPro^{1}
Csurgó	János Varga	(Hungary) László Sótonyi	hummel	tippmixPro^{1}, PriMont, Dráva-Coop
Eger-Eszterházy	Róbert Szabó	(Hungary) Edmond Tóth	Erima	tippmixPro^{1}, SBS, Eger
Gyöngyös	Zsolt Marczin	(Hungary) Tibor Nigrinyi	Salming	B. Braun, tippmixPro^{1}, HE-DO
Komlói BSK	Szabolcs Szigeti	(Hungary) Bálint Klivinger	Zeus	tippmixPro^{1}, Sport36 Komló
Mezőkövesd	Róbert Rapi	(Hungary) Pál Janó	Erima	tippmixPro^{1}, Mezőkövesd Önkormányzata
Orosháza	Tamás Vájer	(Hungary) Dániel Buday	Kappa	tippmixPro^{1}, Linamar
Szeged	Nándor Szögi	(Spain) Juan Carlos Pastor	adidas	tippmixPro^{1}, MOL, Pick, OTP Bank
Tatabánya	László Marosi	(Serbia) Vladan Matić	Jako	tippmixPro^{1}, Grundfos
Vác	Dr. Attila Schoffer	(Hungary) Péter Gúnya	adidas	tippmixPro^{1}
Veszprém	Ákos Hunyadfalvy	(Spain) Xavi Sabaté	adidas	Telekom, Veszprém, tippmixPro^{1}

==== Managerial changes ====
Team	Outgoing manager	Manner of departure	Date of vacancy	Position in table	Replaced by	Date of appointment
Mezőkövesd	(Hungary) László Skaliczki	End of contract	End of 2015–16 season	Pre-season	(Hungary) Ferenc Molnár	1 July 2016
Vác	(Hungary) Gyula Zsiga	Mutual consent	22 November 2016	9th	(Hungary) Péter Gúnya	23 November 2016
Orosháza	(Serbia) Vladan Jordović	Sacked	2 December 2016	12th	(Hungary) Dániel Buday	4 December 2016
Balmazújváros	(Hungary) Ferenc Füzesi	Mutual consent	6 December 2016	13th	(Spain) Magi Serra	7 December 2016
Mezőkövesd	(Hungary) Ferenc Molnár	Resigned	10 December 2016	14th	(Hungary) Pál Janó	11 December 2016
Balmazújváros	(Spain) Magi Serra	Sacked	23 March 2017	13th	(Hungary) Tamás Tréki	23 March 2017
Gyöngyös	(Hungary) Viktor Debre	Resigned	18 March 2017	12th	(Hungary) Tibor Nigrinyi	21 March 2017

== League table ==
Pos	Team	Pld	W	D	L	GF	GA	GD	Pts	Qualification or relegation
1	MOL-Pick Szeged (C)	26	25	0	1	841	574	+267	50 (Note: SZE - VES: 26–23; VES - SZE: 24–22)	Qualification to the Final
2	Telekom Veszprém	26	25	0	1	821	584	+237	50	Qualification to the Final
3	Grundfos Tatabánya KC	26	20	2	4	723	639	+84	42	Qualification to EHF Cup third qualifying round
4	CYEB Budakalász	26	15	1	10	664	677	−13	31	Qualification to EHF Cup third qualifying round
5	Csurgói KK	26	14	2	10	678	661	+17	30	Qualification to EHF Cup second qualifying round
6	Balatonfüredi KSE^{a}	26	13	1	12	667	650	+17	27	Qualification to EHF Cup second qualifying round
7	Orosházi FKSE- LINAMAR	26	12	0	14	656	710	−54	24	
8	Sport36-Komló	26	8	5	13	624	694	−70	21	
9	Eger SBS Eszterházy	26	9	1	16	628	677	−49	19	
10	Váci KSE	26	8	2	16	649	718	−69	18	
11	Ceglédi KKSE	26	7	3	16	632	716	−84	17	
12	B. Braun Gyöngyös	26	7	1	18	629	695	−66	15	
13	Balmazújvárosi KK (R)	26	4	3	19	618	726	−108	11	Relegation to Nemzeti Bajnokság I/B
14	Mezőkövesdi KC (R)	26	4	1	21	669	778	−109	9	Relegation to Nemzeti Bajnokság I/B

(C) Champions; (R) Relegated

=== Schedule and results ===
Home \ Away	BKSE	BKK	BFKC	CEG	CSKK	EGER	GYKK	KBSK	MKC	ORO	SZE	TAT	VÁC	VES
Balatonfüredi KSE		29–25	26–29	23–16	27–23	29–23	26–21	27–27	32–21	30–27	21–33	24–29	26–24	20–31
Balmazújvárosi KK	23–33		22–28	25–25	28–29	26–32	25–21	30–27	29–26	26–30	24–33	22–28	24–19	24–28
Budakalász FKC	21–26	31–23		28–20	24–21	20–19	25–24	34–23	35–30	29–26	20–35	25–26	28–28	22–32
Ceglédi KKSE	30–28	24–24	25–28		19–20	24–20	36–24	26–26	29–28	24–25	23–35	18–25	30–28	24–40
Csurgói KK	18–22	28–21	25–21	25–20		34–17	28–20	28–24	31–22	32–24	24–35	19–19	22–21	26–31
Eger-Eszterházy SzSE	25–21	24–19	20–22	29–27	31–36		25–22	20–25	30–22	32–25	23–33	26–30	36–24	20–28
Gyöngyösi KK	24–23	27–21	23–21	35–27	23–29	21–21		25–26	30–23	18–19	25–39	26–31	28–24	24–35
Komlói BSK	27–30	22–22	22–27	20–22	29–29	27–26	20–19		20–23	25–23	23–26	21–23	25–20	27–31
Mezőkövesdi KC	17–31	34–23	28–29	31–32	27–26	20–21	33–35	27–28		28–29	19–36	32–34	31–27	21–31
Orosházi FKSE	24–22	30–28	26–24	25–18	25–30	26–22	27–23	24–26	31–26		24–37	26–33	29–24	21–28
SC Pick Szeged	29–19	30–24	36–19	25–20	30–23	29–20	36–27	36–16	39–19	36–22		26–23	39–19	26–23
Tatabánya KC	26–22	27–25	36–27	33–22	35–26	26–19	24–19	27–27	34–29	26–22	23–24		25–21	22–28
Váci KSE	29–26	21–18	26–27	32–29	26–24	24–19	23–22	30–24	26–26	30–26	27–36	32–36		22–29
Veszprém KC	28–24	40–17	29–20	34–22	40–22	37–28	28–23	39–17	30–26	33–20	24–22	31–22	33–22	

Legend: Blue = home team win; Yellow = draw; Red = away team win.

== Final ==
Team 1	Agg.	Team 2	Game 1	Game 2
MOL-Pick Szeged (1)	47–50	Telekom Veszprém (2)	17–23	30–27

Game 1

20 May 2017; 15:45 (CEST)	Telekom Veszprém	23 – 17	MOL-Pick Szeged	Veszprém Aréna, Veszprém; Attendance: 5,000; Referees: Herczeg, Südi
20 May 2017; 15:45 (CEST)	Gajić, Lékai 4	(8–10)	Bodó 5	Veszprém Aréna, Veszprém; Attendance: 5,000; Referees: Herczeg, Südi
20 May 2017; 15:45 (CEST)	3× (yellow card) 4× (suspension)	Report	3× (yellow card) 5× (suspension)	Veszprém Aréna, Veszprém; Attendance: 5,000; Referees: Herczeg, Südi

Game 2

24 May 2017; 18:00 (CEST)	MOL-Pick Szeged	30 – 27	Telekom Veszprém	Városi Sportcsarnok, Szeged; Attendance: 3,200; Referees: Herczeg, Südi
24 May 2017; 18:00 (CEST)	Källman 7	(15–14)	Pálmarsson 5	Városi Sportcsarnok, Szeged; Attendance: 3,200; Referees: Herczeg, Südi
24 May 2017; 18:00 (CEST)	3× (yellow card) 3× (suspension)	Report	2× (yellow card) 4× (suspension)	Városi Sportcsarnok, Szeged; Attendance: 3,200; Referees: Herczeg, Südi

Telekom Veszprém won the FINAL, 50–47 on aggregate.

2016–17 Nemzeti Bajnokság I Champion

25th title

Alilović, Mikler, Borbély (goalkeepers), Blagotinšek, Gajić, Gulyás, Ilić, G. Iváncsik, Lékai, Marguč, L. Nagy (c), Nilsson, Pálmarsson,
Schuch, Sulić, Terzić, Ugalde (Ancsin, Gyene, Kopljar, Aflitulin, Chema Rodríguez, Milašević, D. Fekete, Slišković, Ligetvári, A. Tóth)
Head coach
Xavi Sabaté

== Season statistics ==
=== Top goalscorers ===
As of matches played on 19 May 2017.

Rank	Player	Team	Goals	Matches
1	(Hungary) Mátyás Győri	Balatonfüred	158	25
2	(Montenegro) Miloš Vujović	Tatabánya	143	26
3	(Slovakia) Radoslav Antl	Eger	137	26
4	(Serbia) (Hungary) Marinko Kekezović	Balmazújváros	123	26
4	(Montenegro) Ivan Perišić	Cegléd	123	25
6	(Czech Republic) Stanislav Kašpárek	Balatonfüred	122	25
7	(Hungary) Bence Nagy	Budakalász	118	21
8	(Croatia) Srećko Jerković	Komlói BSK	117	24
9	(Montenegro) Igor Marković	Komlói BSK	113	21
10	(Belarus) Aleh Astrashapkin	Csurgó	108	26
10	(Montenegro) Milan Popović	Vác	108	26

=== Attendances ===
Pos	Team	Total attendances	Average attendances	Highest attendances	Lowest attendances
1	Telekom Veszprém	23,600	1,815	5,000 (vs. Szeged)	1,000 (vs. Eger)
2	MOL-Pick Szeged	18,805	1,447	3,200 (vs. Veszprém)	500 (vs. Budakalász)
3	Grundfos Tatabánya KC	11,200	862	1,000 (vs. Budakalász)	700 (vs. Komlói BSK)
4	Sport36-Komló	11,170	859	1,000 (vs. Szeged)	500 (vs. Cegléd)
5	Eger SBS Eszterházy	10,195	784	890 (vs. Gyöngyös)	600 (vs. Tatabánya)
6	B. Braun Gyöngyös	10,000	769	1,200 (vs. Veszprém)	400 (vs. Csurgó)
7	Csurgói KK	9,000	692	1,000 (vs. Szeged)	500 (vs. Komlói BSK)
8	Balmazújvárosi KK	8,280	637	780 (vs. Szeged)	400 (vs. Gyöngyös)
9	Ceglédi KKSE	8,200	631	900 (vs. Veszprém)	500 (vs. Balmazújváros)
10	Balatonfüredi KSE	7,350	565	800 (vs. Veszprém)	400 (vs. Balmazújváros)
11	Mezőkövesdi KC	7,100	546	850 (vs. Veszprém)	300 (vs. Cegléd)
12	Váci KSE	5,050	388	620 (vs. Veszprém)	250 (vs. Tatabánya)
13	Orosházi FKSE- LINAMAR	4,400	338	600 (vs. Szeged)	300 (vs. Csurgó)
14	CYEB Budakalász	2,860	220	250 (vs. Veszprém)	200 (vs. Komlói BSK)
Total		137,210	754	5,000 – VES vs. SZE	200 – BFKC vs. KBSK

Source: League matches: NB I 2016/2017

== Number of teams by counties ==
Pos.	County (megye)	No. of teams	Teams
1	Pest	3	Budakalász FKC, Ceglédi KKSE and Váci KSE
2	Heves	2	Eger-Eszterházy SzSE and Gyöngyösi KK
2	Veszprém	2	Balatonfüredi KSE and Telekom Veszprém
4	Baranya	1	Komlói BSK
4	Békés	1	Orosházi FKSE
4	Borsod-Abaúj-Zemplén	1	Mezőkövesdi KC
4	Csongrád	1	MOL-Pick Szeged
4	Hajdú-Bihar	1	Balmazújvárosi KK
4	Komárom-Esztergom	1	Tatabánya KC
4	Somogy	1	Csurgói KK

== See also ==
- 2016–17 Magyar Kupa
- 2016–17 Nemzeti Bajnokság I/B
- 2016–17 Nemzeti Bajnokság II
