= Máté Lékai =

Hungarian handball player (born 1988)

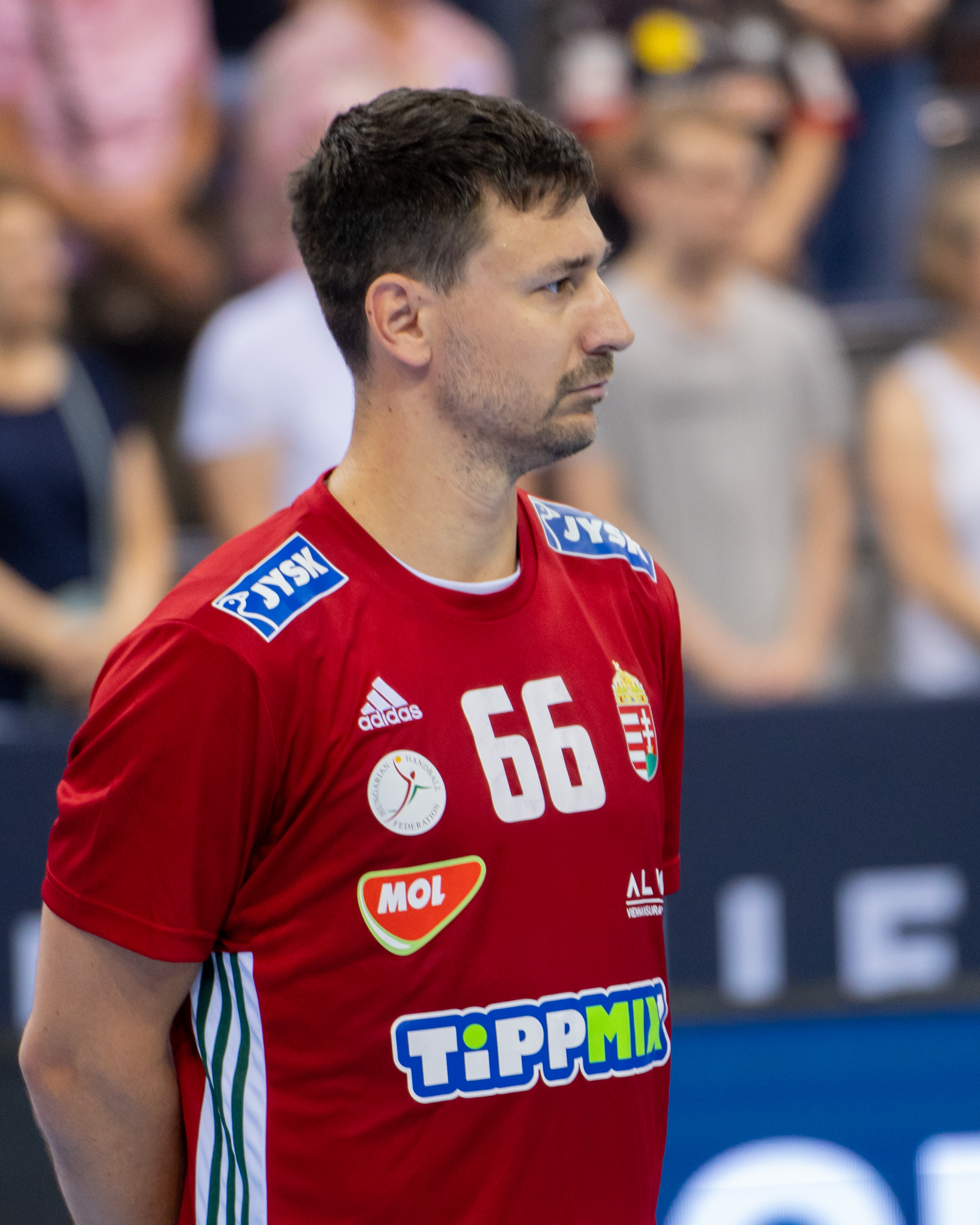

Personal information
- Nationality: Hungarian
- Born: 16 June 1988 (age 38) Budapest, Hungary
- Height: 1.90 m (6 ft 3 in)

Sport
- Sport: Handball
- Position: Centre back
- Current club: Ferencvárosi TC
- Number: 66

Youth career
- Years: Team
- 2002–2004: Szentendre KC

Senior clubs
- Years: Team
- 2004–2010: PLER KC
- 2010–2012: SC Pick Szeged
- 2012–2014: RK Celje
- 2014–2022: Telekom Veszprém
- 2022–: Ferencvárosi TC
National team
Years	Team	Apps	(Gls)
2009–2025	Hungary	196	(586)

Máté Lékai (born 16 June 1988) is a Hungarian handball player for Ferencvárosi TC.

His first major international tournament was the 2011 World Championship, where Hungary finished seventh. He finished fourth with the national team at the 2012 Summer Olympics.

He is the son of former high jumper Olga Juha.

== Honours ==
=== Club ===
PLER KC

- Magyar Kupa
  - Bronze: 2007

Pick Szeged

- Nemzeti Bajnokság I
  - Silver: 2011, 2012
- Magyar Kupa
  - Silver: 2012

RK Celje

- Slovenian First League
  - Gold: 2014
  - Silver: 2013
- Slovenian Cup
  - Gold: 2013, 2014
- Slovenian Supercup
  - Gold: 2014

MKB Veszprém KC

- EHF Champions League :
  - Silver: 2015, 2016, 2019
- SEHA League:
  - Gold: 2015, 2016, 2020, 2021
  - Silver: 2017
- Nemzeti Bajnokság I
  - Gold: 2015, 2016, 2017, 2019
  - Silver: 2018, 2021, 2022
- Magyar Kupa
  - Gold: 2015, 2016, 2017, 2018, 2021, 2022
  - Silver: 2019

Ferencvárosi TC

- Nemzeti Bajnokság I
  - Bronze: 2025

=== Individual ===
- "Teenager's Player of the Year": 2005
- Hungarian Junior Handballer of the Year: 2009
- Silver Cross of the Cross of Merit of the Republic of Hungary (2012)
- Junior Príma díj (2012)
- Hungarian Handballer of the Year: 2017
