= Momir Ilić =

Serbian handball player (born 1981)

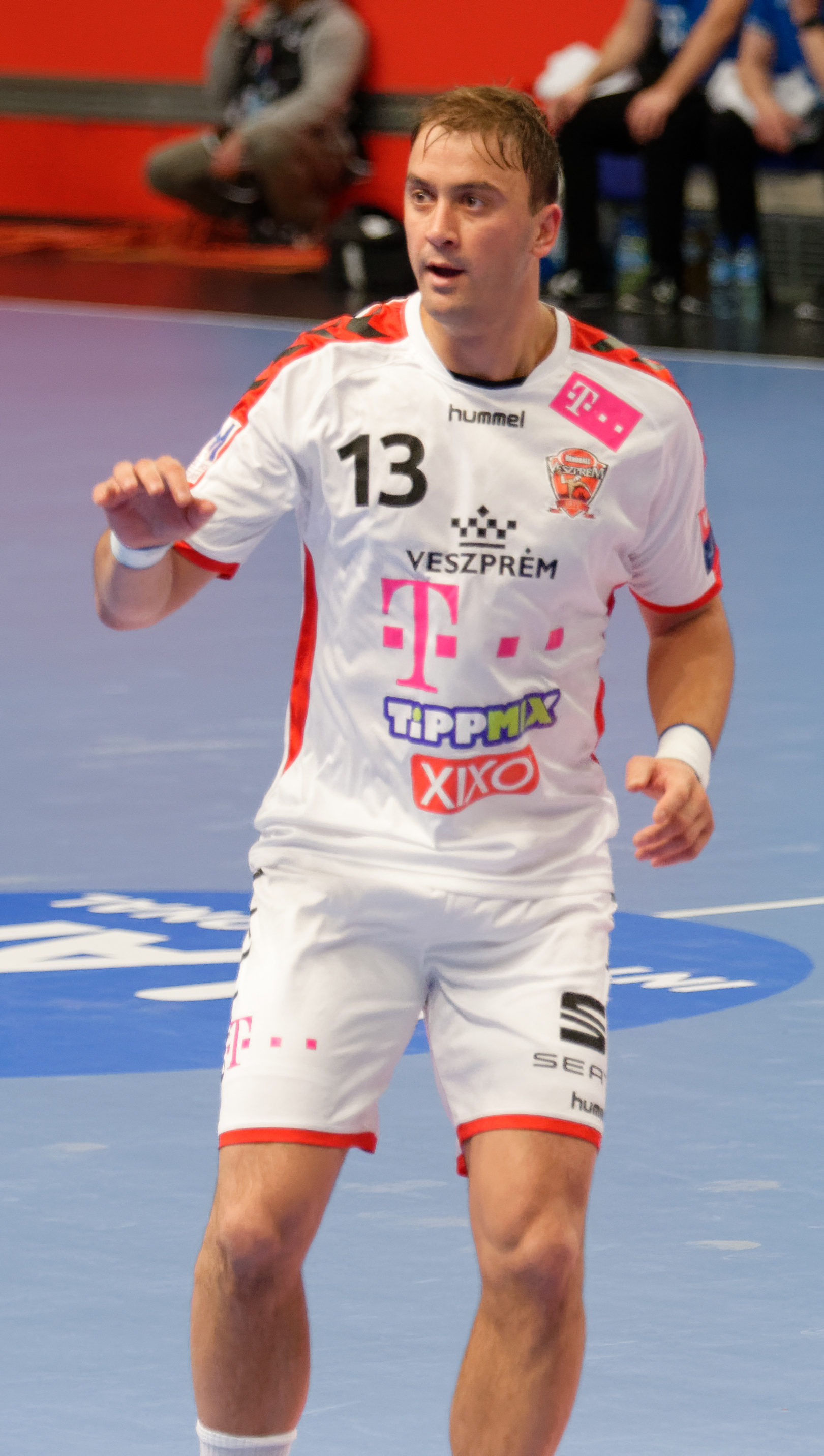
- Ilić in 2017

Personal information
- Full name: Momir Ilić
- Nationality: Serbian / Hungarian
- Born: 22 December 1981 (age 44) Aranđelovac, SR Serbia, Yugoslavia
- Height: 2.00 m (6 ft 7 in)

Sport
- Sport: Handball
- Position: Left back

Youth career
- Years: Team
- –: Šamot

Senior clubs
- Years: Team
- –: Šamot
- 2001–2002: Kolubara
- 2002–2004: Fidelinka
- 2004–2006: Gorenje Velenje
- 2006–2009: VfL Gummersbach
- 2009–2013: THW Kiel
- 2013–2019: Telekom Veszprém
National team
- Years: Team
- 2004–2006: Serbia and Montenegro
- 2006–2015: Serbia

Teams managed
- 2019–2021: Telekom Veszprém U21 (assistant)
- 2021–2024: Telekom Veszprém
- 05/2025–12/2025: HSG Wetzlar
Medal record
Men's handball
Representing Serbia
European Championship
Silver medal – second place	2012 Serbia	Team

Momir Ilić (Serbian Cyrillic: Момир Илић; born 22 December 1981) is a Serbian former handball player.

He became the first player in the history of the EHF Champions League to score over 100 goals in three consecutive seasons. Currently he is the head coach of Telekom Veszprém.

He was included in the European Handball Federation Hall of Fame in 2023.

== Club career ==
After spending two seasons with Fidelinka, Ilić would go on to play for Gorenje Velenje (2004–2006), VfL Gummersbach (2006–2009), THW Kiel (2009–2013), and Telekom Veszprém (2013–2019). He won two EHF Champions League titles with THW Kiel in 2010 and 2012.

== International career ==
At international level, Ilić represented Serbia and Montenegro at the 2006 European Championship. He would later play for Serbia in seven major tournaments, winning the silver medal at the 2012 European Championship.

== Honours ==
=== Player Honours ===
VfL Gummersbach

- EHF Cup: 2008–09

THW Kiel

- Handball-Bundesliga: 2009–10, 2011–12, 2012–13
- DHB-Pokal: 2010–11, 2011–12, 2012–13
- DHB-Supercup: 2011, 2012
- EHF Champions League: 2009–10, 2011–12
- IHF Super Globe: 2011

Telekom Veszprém

- Nemzeti Bajnokság I: 2013–14, 2014–15, 2015–16, 2016–17, 2018–19
- Magyar Kupa: 2013–14, 2014–15, 2015–16, 2016–17, 2017–18
- SEHA League: 2014–15, 2015–16

=== Coach Honours ===
Telekom Veszprém

- Nemzeti Bajnokság I: 2022–23
- Magyar Kupa: 2021–22, 2022–23
- SEHA League: 2020–21, 2021–22

=== Individual ===
- EHF Hall of Fame in 2023.
