= 2018–19 Nemzeti Bajnokság I (men's handball) =

K&H férfi liga
- Season: 2018–19
- Champions: Telekom Veszprém (26th title)
- Relegated: Ceglédi KKSE; Vecsés SE
- Champions League: Telekom Veszprém; MOL-Pick Szeged
- EHF Cup: Grundfos Tatabánya KC; Balatonfüredi KSE; Csurgói KK
- Matches: 184
- Goals: 9,920 (53.91 per match)
- Top goalscorer: Miloš Vujović (180 goals)
- Biggest home win: Veszprém 40–20 Komló (13 November 2018); Veszprém 42–22 Vecsés (22 November 2018)
- Biggest away win: Eger 22–41 Veszprém (18 September 2018); Eger 21–40 Szeged (19 February 2019)
- Highest scoring: Veszprém 45–31 Eger (26 February 2019)

The 2018–19 Nemzeti Bajnokság I (known as the K&H férfi kézilabda liga for sponsorship reasons) is the 68th season of the Nemzeti Bajnokság I, Hungarian premier Handball league.

== Team information ==
As in the previous season, 14 teams played in the 2018–19 season. After the 2017–18 season, Váci KSE and Orosházi FKSE were relegated to the 2018–19 Nemzeti Bajnokság I/B. They were replaced by two clubs from the 2017–18 Nemzeti Bajnokság I/B; Mezőkövesdi KC and Vecsés SE.

Location of teams in 2018–19 Nemzeti Bajnokság I

Team	Location	Arena	Capacity
Balatonfüredi KSE	Balatonfüred	Balatonfüredi Szabadidőközpont	712
Budakalász FKC	Budakalász	Budakalászi Sportcsarnok	400
Ceglédi KKSE	Cegléd	Gál József Sportcsarnok	1,046
Csurgói KK	Csurgó	Sótonyi László Sportcsarnok	1,200
Dabas KK	Dabas	OBO Aréna	1,920
DVTK-Eger	Eger	Kemény Ferenc Sportcsarnok	875
Ferencvárosi TC	Budapest, IX. ker	Elek Gyula Aréna	1,300
Gyöngyösi KK	Gyöngyös	Dr. Fejes András Sportcsarnok	1,500
Komlói BSK	Komló	Komlói Sportközpont	800
Mezőkövesdi KC	Mezőkövesd	Városi Sportcsarnok	850
SC Pick Szeged	Szeged	Újszegedi Sportcsarnok	3,200
Tatabánya KC	Tatabánya	Földi Imre Sportcsarnok	1,000
Vecsés SE	Vecsés	Városi Sportcsarnok (Monor)	1,030
Veszprém KC	Veszprém	Veszprém Aréna	5,096

=== Personnel and kits ===
Following is the list of clubs competing in 2018–19 Nemzeti Bajnokság I, with their president, head coach, kit manufacturer and shirt sponsor.

Team	President	Head coach	Kit manufacturer	Shirt sponsor(s)
Balatonfüred	László Csima	(Hungary) István Csoknyai	Erima	tippmix^{1}, Sennebogen, 77 Elektronika, Kinizsi Bank
Budakalász	Gábor Hajdu	(Hungary) Gyula Forgács	adidas	tippmix^{1}, CYEB, Vizes Nyolcas
Cegléd	István Borsos	(Hungary) László Jakab	2Rule	tippmix^{1},
Csurgó	János Varga	(Hungary) József Bencze	hummel	tippmix^{1}, PriMont, Dráva-Coop
Dabas	Csaba Prohászka	(Hungary) Győző Tomori	hummel	tippmix^{1}, OBO,
DVTK-Eger	Róbert Szabó	(Hungary) Edmond Tóth	2Rule	tippmix^{1}, SBS, MátraMetál, Hesi
Ferencváros	Gábor Kubatov	(Hungary) Attila Horváth	Nike	tippmix^{1}, Budapest
Gyöngyös	Zsolt Marczin	(Hungary) Csaba Konkoly	hummel	B. Braun, tippmix^{1}, HE-DO
Komlói BSK	Szabolcs Szigeti	(Hungary) Bálint Klivinger	Zeus	tippmix^{1}, Sport36 Komló
Mezőkövesd	Róbert Rapi	(Hungary) Dániel Buday	Erima	tippmixPro^{1}
Szeged	Nándor Szögi	(Spain) Juan Carlos Pastor	adidas	MOL, tippmix^{1}, Pick, OTP Bank
Tatabánya	László Marosi	(Serbia) Vladan Matić	Jako	tippmix^{1}, Grundfos
Vecsés	Attila Seres	(Serbia) Damir Stojanović	Unit	tippmix^{1}, Toyota Kovács, Hotel Stáció, Pátria Takarék
Veszprém	Gábor Kálomista	(Spain) David Davis	hummel	Veszprém, Telekom, tippmix^{1}, XIXO

==== Managerial changes ====
Team	Outgoing manager	Manner of departure	Date of vacancy	Position in table	Replaced by	Date of appointment
Mezőkövesd	(Hungary) Péter Drizner	Mutual consent	End of 2017–18 season	Pre-season	(Hungary) Dániel Buday	1 July 2018
Veszprém	(Sweden) Ljubomir Vranjes	Sacked	1 October 2018	2nd	(Hungary) István Gulyás (caretaker)	2 October 2018
Vecsés	(Hungary) Károly Nagy	Sacked	2 October 2018	14th	(Serbia) Damir Stojanović	3 October 2018
Veszprém	(Hungary) István Gulyás	End of caretaker spell	9 October 2018	2nd	(Spain) David Davis	9 October 2018

== League table ==
Pos	Team	Pld	W	D	L	GF	GA	GD	Pts	Qualification or relegation
1	MOL-Pick Szeged	26	25	1	0	907	656	+251	51	Qualification to the Finals
2	Telekom Veszprém	26	23	0	3	908	640	+268	46	Qualification to the Finals
3	Grundfos Tatabánya KC	26	20	2	4	740	637	+103	42	Qualification to EHF Cup third qualifying round
4	Balatonfüredi KSE	26	18	0	8	708	643	+65	36	Qualification to EHF Cup third qualifying round
5	Csurgói KK	26	15	3	8	722	689	+33	33	Qualification to EHF Cup second qualifying round
6	HE-DO B. Braun Gyöngyös	26	14	3	9	700	687	+13	31	
7	Ferencvárosi TC	26	11	0	15	695	690	+5	22	
8	RotaChrom Dabas	26	9	3	14	660	708	−48	21	
9	Sport36-Komló	26	10	1	15	672	744	−72	21	
10	DVTK-Eger	26	7	3	16	701	779	−78	17	
11	CYEB Budakalász	26	6	4	16	644	725	−81	16	
12	Mezőkövesdi KC	26	6	3	17	625	740	−115	15	
13	Ceglédi KKSE (R)	26	6	1	19	635	761	−126	13	Relegation to Nemzeti Bajnokság I/B
14	Vecsés SE (R)	26	0	0	26	603	821	−218	0	Relegation to Nemzeti Bajnokság I/B

Updated to match(es) played on 18 May 2019. Source: mksz.hu
Rules for classification: 1) Points; 2) Goal difference; 3) Head-to-head points; 4) Head-to-head goal difference; 5) Goals scored; 6) Matches won; 7) Draw (Note: Head-to-head record is used only after all the matches between the teams in question have been played)
(R) Relegated

=== Schedule and results ===
In the table below the home teams are listed on the left and the away teams along the top.

Home \ Away	BKSE	BFKC	CEG	CSKK	DAB	EGER	FTC	GYKK	KBSK	MKC	SZEG	TAT	VECS	VESZ
Balatonfüredi KSE		28–25	30–25	26–19	26–19	32–25	25–17	27–24	35–24	28–20	29–37	26–30	31–24	29–32
Budakalász FKC	23–24		28–22	22–24	23–23	25–28	27–33	20–20	25–20	25–25	28–33	22–33	27–23	27–38
Ceglédi KKSE	22–28	30–33		22–27	24–31	30–29	33–26	25–24	22–25	20–20	29–37	21–27	24–22	23–41
Csurgói KK	26–20	36–26	35–24		26–26	31–27	28–25	29–26	31–29	29–24	25–36	20–28	35–24	24–31
Dabas KK	22–28	27–23	30–25	24–27		28–26	30–31	23–23	30–28	26–25	22–32	18–30	33–19	28–40
DVTK-Eger	25–27	26–30	25–20	29–29	29–25		26–24	24–24	36–29	27–28	21–40	25–25	31–26	22–41
Ferencvárosi TC	31–26	32–25	28–19	31–34	22–24	30–18		34–21	30–20	27–19	22–35	25–29	41–31	26–27
Gyöngyösi KK	20–26	27–22	30–25	27–24	28–27	33–30	26–20		32–22	29–20	22–27	24–22	33–24	23–34
Komlói BSK	25–31	34–24	31–27	27–27	25–24	32–30	23–18	23–24		28–23	24–34	29–32	29–21	17–31
Mezőkövesdi KC	20–32	24–24	22–24	21–36	25–23	25–24	23–22	25–35	27–28		30–36	23–29	31–26	22–29
SC Pick Szeged	33–22	29–20	39–23	34–26	36–29	42–27	39–30	38–29	39–29	40–25		34–27	38–24	25–23
Tatabánya KC	22–18	29–25	28–23	28–26	27–18	32–25	27–22	30–33	30–26	31–26	25–25		32–23	26–24
Vecsés SE	21–30	21–28	24–25	20–31	20–24	26–35	19–25	28–31	21–25	25–30	18–37	24–34		27–39
Telekom Veszprém	32–24	36–17	41–28	32–17	40–26	45–31	36–23	38–32	40–20	37–22	27–32	32–27	42–22	

Legend: Blue = home team win; Yellow = draw; Red = away team win.

== Finals ==
Team 1	Agg.	Team 2	Game 1	Game 2
MOL-Pick Szeged (1)	51–62	Telekom Veszprém (2)	24–35	27–27

Game 1

23 May 2019; 18:30 (CEST)	Telekom Veszprém	35 – 24	MOL-Pick Szeged	Veszprém Aréna, Veszprém; Attendance: 5,019; Referees: Gjeding, Hansen (DEN)
23 May 2019; 18:30 (CEST)	Gajić 9	(13–14)	Cañellas 7	Veszprém Aréna, Veszprém; Attendance: 5,019; Referees: Gjeding, Hansen (DEN)
23 May 2019; 18:30 (CEST)	1× (yellow card) 7× (suspension) 1× (red card)	Report	2× (yellow card) 4× (suspension)	Veszprém Aréna, Veszprém; Attendance: 5,019; Referees: Gjeding, Hansen (DEN)

Game 2

26 May 2019; 18:00 (CEST)	MOL-Pick Szeged	27 – 27	Telekom Veszprém	Városi Sportcsarnok, Szeged; Attendance: 3,200; Referees: Kurtagic, Wetterwik (SWE)
26 May 2019; 18:00 (CEST)	Cañellas, Balogh, Gaber 4	(14–14)	Štrlek 5	Városi Sportcsarnok, Szeged; Attendance: 3,200; Referees: Kurtagic, Wetterwik (SWE)
26 May 2019; 18:00 (CEST)	3× (yellow card) 5× (suspension) 1× (red card)	Report	6× (suspension)	Városi Sportcsarnok, Szeged; Attendance: 3,200; Referees: Kurtagic, Wetterwik (SWE)

Telekom Veszprém won the Finals, 62–51 on aggregate.

2018–19 Nemzeti Bajnokság I
Champion

Telekom Veszprém
26th title

Sterbik, Mikler (goalkeepers), Blagotinšek, Gajić, Ilić, Jamali, Lékai, Mačkovšek, Mahé,
Manaskov, Marguč, L. Nagy (c), Nenadić, Nilsson, Štrlek, Terzić, Tønnesen, R. Toft Hansen
Head coach: David Davis, Assistant coach: Carlos Pérez

== Season statistics ==
=== Top goalscorers ===
As of 19 May 2018.

Rank	Player	Team	Goals	Matches
1	(Montenegro) Miloš Vujović	Tatabánya	180	26
2	(Montenegro) Igor Marković	Komlói BSK	161	25
3	(Hungary) Gábor Ancsin	Ferencváros	144	24
4	(Serbia) Marko Vasić	Csurgó	122	21
5	(Belarus) Aleh Astrashapkin	Csurgó	119	24
6	(Hungary) Dominik Máthé	Budakalász	115	26
6	(Hungary) Ádám Tóth	Budakalász	115	26
8	(Croatia) Petar Topić	Balatonfüred	113	26
9	(Lithuania) Rolandas Bernatonis	DVTK-Eger	109	23
10	(Croatia) Srećko Jerković	Komlói BSK	107	24

=== Attendances ===
Updated to games played on 19 May 2019. Source: League matches: NB I 2018/2019
Attendance numbers without Final matches.

Pos	Team	Total	High	Low	Average	Change
1	MOL-Pick Szeged	25,900	3,200 (vs. Veszprém)	1,000 (vs. Mezőkövesd)	1,992	+22,74%
2	Telekom Veszprém	25,347	5,000 (vs. Szeged)	550 (vs. Komló)	1,949	−22,75%
3	RotaChrom Dabas	16,650	2,000 (two matches)	800 (vs. Tatabánya)	1,281	−1,46%
4	Grundfos Tatabánya KC	12,600	1,200 (three matches)	700 (vs. Cegléd)	969	+2,87%
5	HE-DO B. Braun Gyöngyös	12,200	1,400 (two matches)	600 (four matches)	938	+20,10%
6	Csurgói KK	10,600	1,200 (vs. Szeged)	500 (vs. Eger)	815	+4,35%
7	Sport36-Komló	9,900	900 (four matches)	700 (nine matches)	762	−7,41%
8	DVTK-Eger	9,875	875 (five matches)	500 (two matches)	760	+6,84%
9	Mezőkövesdi KC	9,207	800 (seven matches)	400 (two matches)	708	+15,50%^{1}
10	Balatonfüredi KSE	8,750	1,100 (vs. Veszprém)	250 (vs. Komló)	673	+21,48%
11	Ceglédi KKSE	7,880	880 (vs. Veszprém)	350 (vs. Tatabánya)	606	+15,87%
12	Ferencvárosi TC	5,800	1000 (vs. Veszprém)	300 (four matches)	446	+7,47%
13	Vecsés SE	4,750	1,000 (vs. Szeged)	150 (vs. Budakalász)	365	+93,12%^{1}
14	CYEB Budakalász	2,860	220 (thirteen matches)	／	220	+1,38%
Total		162,319	5,000 (VESZ vs. SZEG)	150 (VECS vs. BFKC)	892	+5,31%

- 1: Team played last season in Nemzeti Bajnokság I/B.

=== Number of teams by counties ===
Pos.	County (megye)	No. of teams	Teams
1	Pest	4	Budakalász FKC, Dabas KK, Ceglédi KKSE and Vecsés SE
2	Heves	2	DVTK-Eger and Gyöngyösi KK
2	Veszprém	2	Balatonfüredi KSE and Telekom Veszprém
4	Baranya	1	Komlói BSK
4	Borsod-Abaúj-Zemplén	1	Mezőkövesdi KC
4	Budapest (capital)	1	Ferencvárosi TC
4	Csongrád	1	MOL-Pick Szeged
4	Komárom-Esztergom	1	Tatabánya KC
4	Somogy	1	Csurgói KK

== See also ==
- 2018–19 Magyar Kupa
- 2018–19 Nemzeti Bajnokság I/B
- 2018–19 Nemzeti Bajnokság II
