= 2011–12 Magyar Kupa (men's handball) =

55th Hungarian men's handball competition

Tournament details
- Country: Hungary
- Teams: 58

Final positions
- Champions: MKB Veszprém (21st title)
- Runner-up: Pick Szeged

The 2011–12 Magyar Kupa (English: Hungarian Cup) was the 55th edition of the tournament.

== Matches ==
A total of matches will take place, starting with Round 1 on 2 September 2011 and culminating with the final on 15 April 2012 at the Sportmax in Budapest.

=== Quarter-finals ===
Team 1	Agg.	Team 2	1st leg	2nd leg
CLAAS-Törökszentmiklósi KE (I/B)	–	Balatonfüredi KSE (I)	20–29	
Tatai HAC (I)	53–88	MKB Veszprém (I)	24–44	29–44
Csurgói KK (I)	40–51	Pick Szeged (I)	24–22	16–29
Tatabánya Carbonex KC (I)	66–53	B.Braun Gyöngyös (I)	36–25	30–28

=== Final four ===
The final four will be held on 14 and 15 April 2012 at the Sportmax 2 Hegyvidék in Budapest.

Semi-finals
14 April, 16:00
Pick Szeged	24
Balatonfüredi KSE	21
14 April, 18:00
MKB Veszprém	35
Tatabánya Carbonex KC	27

Final
15 April, 16:00
Pick Szeged	26
MKB Veszprém	27
Third place
15 April, 14:00
Balatonfüredi KSE	21
Tatabánya Carbonex KC	24

Final

15 April; 16:00	Pick Szeged	26 – 27	MKB Veszprém	Sportmax 2, Budapest; Attendance: 1,300; Referees: Kékes, Kékes
15 April; 16:00	Prodanović 9	(18–16)	Vujin 7	Sportmax 2, Budapest; Attendance: 1,300; Referees: Kékes, Kékes
15 April; 16:00	3× (yellow card) 8× (suspension) 2× (red card)	Report	3× (yellow card) 8× (suspension) 2× (red card)	Sportmax 2, Budapest; Attendance: 1,300; Referees: Kékes, Kékes

2011-12 Magyar Kupa
Winner

MKB Veszprém
21st Title

Mirko Alilović, Nándor Fazekas, Szilveszter Liszkai, Gábor Császár, Péter Gulyás, Gergő Iváncsik, David Koražija, Balázs Laluska, Carlos Pérez, Timuzsin Schuch, Renato Sulić, Mirsad Terzić, Tomáš Urban, Uroš Vilovski, Marko Vujin
Head coach
Lajos Mocsai

==== Final standings ====
	Team
	MKB Veszprém
Silver medal	Pick Szeged
Bronze medal	Tatabánya Carbonex KC
	Balatonfüredi KSE

== See also ==
- 2011–12 Nemzeti Bajnokság I
