= Dániel Buday =

Hungarian handball player (born 1981)

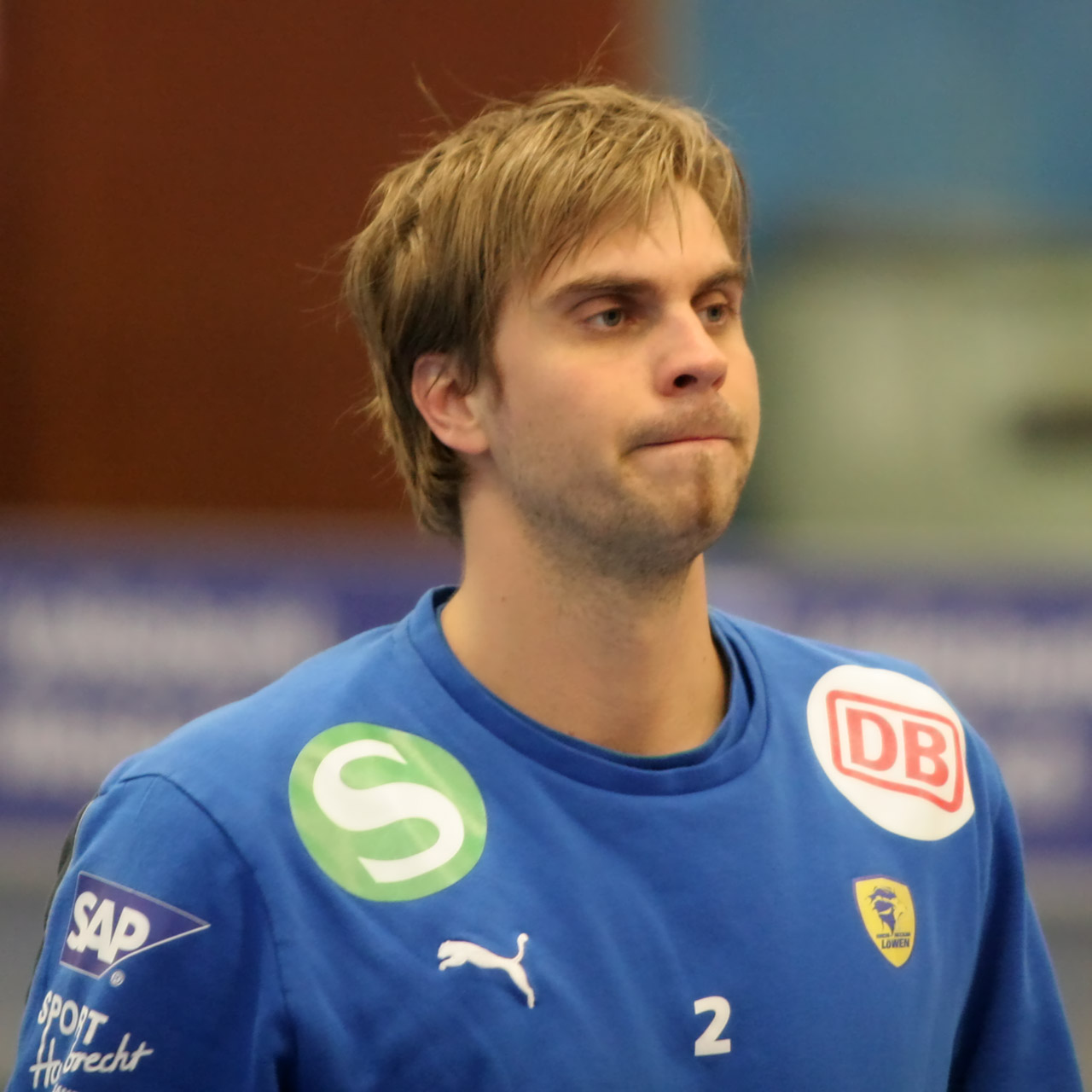

Personal information
- Full name: Dániel Buday
- Nationality: Hungarian
- Born: 5 January 1981 (age 45) Hódmezővásárhely, Hungary
- Height: 1.95 m (6 ft 5 in)

Sport
- Sport: Handball
- Position: Playmaker
- Current club: Hatvani KSZSE

Youth career
- Years: Team
- –: SC Pick Szeged

Senior clubs
- Years: Team
- –2003: SC Pick Szeged
- 2003–2007: KC Veszprém
- 2007–2009: Rhein-Neckar Löwen
- 2008–2009: → Kadetten Schaffhausen (loan)
- 2009–2010: Csurgói KK
- 2010–2011: Ferencvárosi TC
- 2011–2013: SC Pick Szeged
- 2013–2016: Orosházi FKSE
- 2018–: Hatvani KSZSE
National team
Years	Team	Apps	(Gls)
2000–2007	Hungary	93	(380)
- Updated on 4 September 2018

Dániel Buday (born 5 January 1981 in Hódmezővásárhely) is a retired Hungarian handballer who most recently played for Orosházi FKSE.

A former Hungarian international, Buday played at two European Championships (2004, 2006) and at the World Championship in 2003.

== Achievements ==
- Nemzeti Bajnokság I:
  - Winner: 2004, 2005, 2006
- Magyar Kupa:
  - Winner: 2004, 2005, 2007
- EHF Cup Winners' Cup:
  - Finalist: 2008
