= Carlos Ruesga =

Spanish handball player (born 1985)

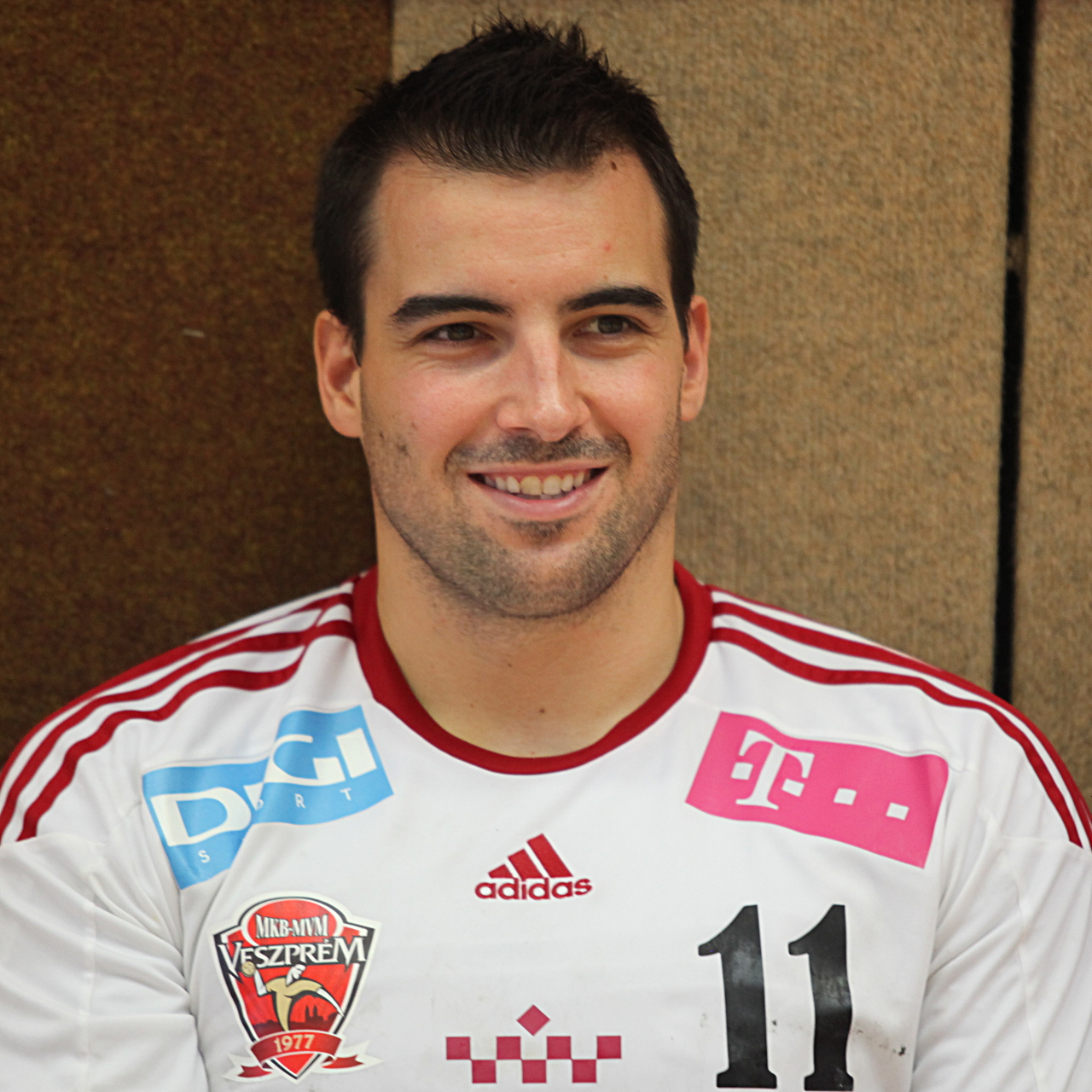

Personal information
- Full name: Carlos Ruesga Pasarín
- Nationality: Spanish
- Born: 10 March 1985 (age 41) Gijón, Spain
- Height: 1.84 m (6 ft 0 in)

Sport
- Sport: Handball
- Position: Centre/Left back
- Current club: Unión Financiera Base Oviedo

Senior clubs
- Years: Team
- –2005: Grupo Covadonga
- 2005–2010: Portland San Antonio
- 2010–2013: Ademar León
- 2013–2015: MKB-MVM Veszprém
- 2015–2016: FC Barcelona
- 2016–2023: Sporting CP
- 2023–: Unión Financiera Base Oviedo
National team
Years	Team	Apps	(Gls)
2006-2015	Spain	70	(136)
Medal record
World Championships
Gold medal – first place	2013 Spain	Team
European Championship
Bronze medal – third place	2014 Denmark	Team

Carlos Ruesga (born 10 March 1985) is a Spanish handball player for Unión Financiera Base Oviedo and the Spanish national team. He is a world Champion from the 2013 World Championship.

== Career ==
Ruesga started playing handball for his hometown club Grupo Covadonga and in 2005 he joined reigning Spanish Champions Portland San Antonio where he made his senor debut.

in the 2005-06 season he reached the final of the 2005-06 EHF Champions League but lost to league rivals BM Ciudad Real. Behind Ivano Balić he was the second choce on the centre back position.

At the beginning of the 2007-08 season Kristian Kjelling was injured and therefore Ruesga was re-trained as a left back.

He joined Ademar Leon in 2010. After 3 years at the club he joined Hungarian KC Veszprém. Here he won the League and Cup double in both 2013-14 and 2014-15. in the 2014-15 EHF Champions League he reached the fnal but lost to FC Barcelona.

He left Veszprém in 2015 and joined FC Barcelona. Here he won the Liga ASOBAL but he was mostly a second choice player, scoring 17 goals in 14 games.

Just a season later he left Barca and joined Portuguese top team Sporting CP. Here he won the 2017 EHF Challenge Cup, the 2017 and 2018 Portuguese Championship as well as the 2022 and 2023 Portuguese Cup.

For the 2022-23 season he returned to Spain and joined second tier side Unión Financiera Base Oviedo.

== National team ==
Ruesga played for the Spanish national team between 2006 and 2015. His debut was on 10 June 2006 against Germany.

He was part of the Spanish extended squad for the 2008 European Championship but did not see playing time. At the 2009 World Men's Handball Championship he was part of the team that finished 13th.

At the 2013 World Championship he was part of the Spanish team that won gold medals. He played 9 games and scored 8 goals at the tournament.

He represented Spain at the 2014 European Championship where Spain won bronze medals. He did however only play 4 games and did not score a goal.
