= Veszprém KC =

Hungarian handball club

One Veszprém
- Full name: Veszprémi Építők Sport Egyesület
- Nickname: Építők
- Short name: Veszprém
- Founded: 1977; 49 years ago
- Arena: Veszprém Aréna, Veszprém
- Capacity: 5,096
- President: Csaba Bartha
- Head coach: Xavier Pascual
- Captain: Yehia El-Deraa
- League: Nemzeti Bajnokság I
- 2024–25: 1st of 14 (champions)
- Club colours
| Home | Away |

Veszprém HC is a Hungarian professional handball club from Veszprém, that for sponsorship reasons is called One Veszprém. Veszprém plays in the Hungarian Nemzeti Bajnokság I and are the most successful team in the country, having won the Hungarian Championship a record 30 times and the Hungarian Cup title a record 32 times. Veszprém has also won the regional SEHA League 5 times.

Veszprém are one of the three Hungarian clubs that have won a major European trophy, most recently in 2008, when they overcame Rhein-Neckar Löwen and were crowned as the EHF Cup Winner's Cup champions. They are yet to win the EHF Champions League, having been defeated in the final on four occasions.

The main sponsors of the club were the MKB Bank, MVM Group and the Magyar Telekom. In the summer of 2015, the MKB Bank decided to quit sponsoring after a 10-year interval. Their main focus is now on the younger teams. Currently the main sponsor is One Hungary.

Location of One Veszprém

== History ==
Veszprém has a long tradition of handball and in 1970 the Bakony Chemist TC women's team won the first championship among the rural ensembles. The sports club was founded in 1977 under the wing of the Veszprém County State Construction Company (VÁÉV) with the name Veszprém Builders, after a political decision was taken in the city, which urged the men's division of BVTC, which had been relegated from NB II, to be taken over by the VÁÉV.

In 1981, under the executive direction of Csaba Hajnal, the new team was promoted to the first division, where it finished each season with a medal, winning silver in its first season. Over the next three years, it won one silver and two bronze medals in the championship, and two silver medals and one gold medal. In 1985 and 1986, the team won the championship.

Over the next four years, the team won only four silver medals (three times at the Rába ETO, 1990–1992 Bramac, Fotex until 2005, MKB until 2015, MVM until 2016, Telekom-backed team from 2016 to 2024: since 1992, 23 seasons, 20 championship gold and 3 silver medals have been awarded to Veszprém. (Meanwhile, between May 2008 and October 2011, they did not lose a single league game.)

After the success in 1984, 3 Győr victories came, and from 1988 onwards, 19 cup victories in 24 years were added to the list of glory, the brightest result being four KEK finals (2 wins and 2 silver medals) and four EHF Champions League 2nd place.

Since July 2008, Veszprém Aréna has been the home ground for ONE Veszprém, previously playing their matches in the 15th street hall.

In April 2020, fans voted for the All Star team in club history, which includes Árpád Sterbik, Gergő Iváncsik, Carlos Pérez, József Éles, László Nagy, Mirza Džomba and Andreas Nilsson.

In 2024 they had four captains: Ludovic Fabregas (EHF Champions League) Patrik Ligetvári (K&H liga) Gasper Marguc (Hungarian Cup) Nedim Remili (Club World Cup)

== Crest, colours, supporters ==
=== Naming history ===
| Name | Period |
|---|---|
| Veszprémi Építők SK | −1980 |
| Veszprémi ÁÉV SC | 1981 |
| Veszprémi Építők SK | 1982–1986 |
| VÁÉV Bramac | 1987–1990 |
| Bramac SE | 1990–1992 |
| Fotex Veszprém SE | 1992–1996 |
| Fotex KC Veszprém | 1996–2005 |
| MKB Veszprém KC | 2005–2013 |
| MKB-MVM Veszprém | 2013–2015 |
| MVM Veszprém | 2015–2016 |
| Telekom Veszprém | 2016–2024 |
| One Veszprém | 2025–present |

=== Kit manufacturers and shirt sponsor ===
The following table shows in detail Veszprém KC kit manufacturers and shirt sponsors by year:

| Period | Kit manufacturer | Shirt sponsor |
|---|---|---|
| 2006–2007 | (Germany) | MKB Bank / T-Mobile |
| 2007–2010 | (Germany) | MKB Bank / T-Mobile |
| 2010–2012 | (Germany) | MKB Bank / T-Mobile |
| 2012–2013 | (Germany) | MKB Bank / T-Mobile / Veszprém |
| 2013–2015 | (Germany) | MKB Bank / MVM / Veszprém |
| 2015–2016 | (Germany) | Balaton / Veszprém |
| 2016–2017 | (Germany) | Magyar Telekom / Veszprém |
| 2017–2020 | (Denmark) | Magyar Telekom / Veszprém |
| 2020–2024 | (Hungary) 2Rule | Magyar Telekom / Veszprém |
| 2025– | (Hungary) 2Rule | One Hungary / Veszprém / Tippmix / MBH Bank |

=== Kits ===
HOME
| 1987–88 | 2005–07 | 2009–10 | 2010–11 | 2011–12 | 2012–13 | 2013–16 | 2017–19 | 2019–20 |

AWAY
| 1988–89 | 2005–07 | 2009–10 | 2010–11 | 2011–12 | 2012–13 | 2013–16 |

THIRD
| 2009–10 | 2010–11 | 2011–12 | 2012–13 | 2013–16 | 2020–21 |

== Arena information ==
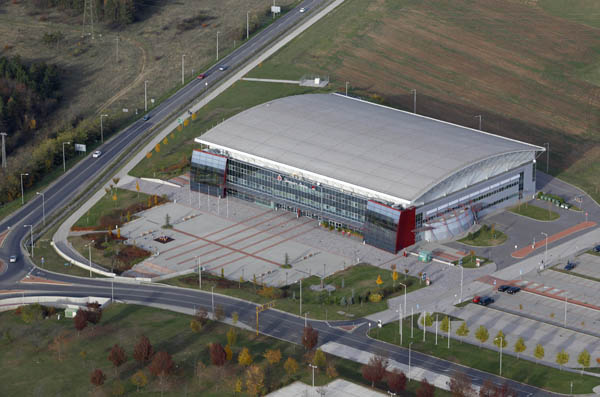
Home hall: Veszprém Aréna

- Name: – Veszprém Aréna
- City: – Veszprém
- Capacity: – 5096
- Address: – 8200 Veszprém, Külső-kádártai út 5.

== Team ==
=== Current squad ===
Squad for the 2026–2027 season

Goalkeepers

- 1 (Sweden) Mikael Appelgren
- 12 (Denmark) Emil Nielsen

Left Wingers

- 9 (France) Hugo Descat
- 66 (Hungary) Máté Gáncs-Pető

Right Wingers

- 27 (Slovakia) Adam Dopjera
- 32 (France) Yanis Lenne
- 91 (Hungary) Bence Imre

Line players

- 42 (Denmark) Lukas Jørgensen
- 46 (Serbia) Dragan Pechmalbec
- 80 (Egypt) Ahmed Mesilhy

Left Backs

- 2 (Brazil) Thiagus Petrus
- 15 (Egypt) Ahmed Hesham
- 23 (Hungary) Patrik Ligetvári
- 90 (Egypt) Ali Zein

Central Backs

- 25 (Croatia) Luka Cindrić
- 39 (Egypt) Yehia El-Deraa (c)
- 44 (Serbia) Stefan Dodić

Right Backs

- 5 (Croatia) Ivan Martinović
- 29 (France) Nedim Remili
- 13 (Hungary) János Dániel Barna

Squad information
| No. | Nat. | Player | Position | Date of birth | In | Contract until | Previous club |
|---|---|---|---|---|---|---|---|
| 1 | (Sweden) | Mikael Appelgren | Goalkeeper | 6 September 1989 | 2025 | 2027 | (Germany) Rhein-Neckar Löwen |
| 2 | (Brazil) | Thiagus Petrus | Line Player | 25 January 1989 | 2025 | 2027 | (Spain) FC Barcelona Handbol |
| 5 | (Croatia) | Ivan Martinović (handballer) | Right Back | 6 January 1998 | 2025 | 2029 | (Germany) Rhein-Neckar Löwen |
| 9 | (France) | Hugo Descat | Left Wing | 16 August 1992 | 2023 | 2027 | (France) Montpellier Handball |
| 12 | (Denmark) | Emil Nielsen | Goalkeeper | 10 March 1997 | 2026 | 2029 | (Spain) FC Barcelona Handbol |
| 15 | (Egypt) | Ahmed Hesham | Left Back | 15 May 2000 | 2025 | 2029 | (France) Montpellier Handball |
| 23 | (Hungary) | Patrik Ligetvári | Left Back | 13 February 1996 | 2020 | 2028 | (Spain) BM Logroño La Rioja |
| 25 | (Croatia) | Luka Cindrić | Centre Back | 5 July 1993 | 2025 | 2028 | (Romania) Dinamo Bucuresti |
| 29 | (France) | Nedim Remili | Right Back | 18 July 1995 | 2023 | 2029 | (Poland) Industria Kielce |
| 32 | (France) | Yanis Lenne | Right Wing | 29 June 1996 | 2025 | 2029 | (France) Montpellier Handball |
| 39 | (Egypt) | Yehia El-Deraa | Centre Back | 17 July 1995 | 2022 | 2029 | (Egypt) Zamalek |
| 42 | (Denmark) | Lukas Jørgensen | Line Player | 31 March 1999 | 2026 | 2029 | (Germany) Flensburg-Handewitt |
| 44 | (Serbia) | Stefan Dodić | Centre Back | 13 March 2003 | 2026 | 2027 | (Serbia) RK Vojvodina |
| 46 | (Serbia) | Dragan Pechmalbec | Line Player | 5 January 1996 | 2022 | 2029 | (France) HBC Nantes |
| 66 | (Hungary) | Máté Gáncs-Pető | Left Wing | 2 October 2007 | 2024 | 2028 | (Hungary) Veszprém Handball Academy |
| 80 | (Egypt) | Ahmed Mesilhy | Line Player | 25 November 1994 | 2025 | 2027 | (Egypt) Al Ahly |
| 90 | (Egypt) | Ali Zein | Left Back | 14 December 1990 | 2025 | 2027 | (Romania) Dinamo Bucuresti |
| 91 | (Hungary) | Bence Imre | Right Wing | 15 October 2002 | 2026 | 2030 | (Germany) THW Kiel |

=== Transfers ===
Transfers for the 2026–27 season

Joining

- (Denmark) Emil Nielsen (GK) from (Spain) FC Barcelona
- (Denmark) Lukas Jørgensen (LP) from (Germany) SG Flensburg-Handewitt
- (Hungary) Bence Imre (RW) from (Germany) THW Kiel
- (Hungary) Benedek Nagy (GK) back from loan at (Germany) HBW Balingen-Weilstetten
- (Hungary) Krisztián Mikler (GK) back from loan at (Hungary) NEKA

Leaving

- (Slovenia) Gašper Marguč (RW) to (Slovenia) RK Celje
- (Spain) Rodrigo Corrales (GK) to (France) Paris Saint-Germain
- (Iceland) Bjarki Már Elísson (LW) to (France) Paris Saint-Germain
- (Hungary) Robin Molnár (LW) to (Hungary) MOL Tatabánya KC
- (Hungary) Benedek Nagy (GK) to (Spain) BM Atlético Valladolid
- (Hungary) Krisztián Mikler (GK) to (Hungary) HE-DO B. Braun Gyöngyös

=== Transfer History ===
Transfers for the 2025–26 season

Joining

- (Croatia) Ivan Martinović (RB) from (Germany) Rhein-Neckar Löwen
- (Sweden) Mikael Appelgren (GK) from (Germany) Rhein-Neckar Löwen
- (Egypt) Ali Zein (LB) from (Romania) Dinamo București
- (Egypt) Ahmed Mesilhy (LP) from (Egypt) Al Ahly
- (Egypt) Ahmed Hesham (LB) (from (France) Montpellier Handball)
- (Brazil) Thiagus dos Santos (LB) from (Spain) FC Barcelona
- (France) Yanis Lenne (RW) (from (France) Montpellier Handball)
- (Hungary) Robin Molnár (LW) from (Hungary) NEKA
- (Serbia) Stefan Dodić (CB) from (Serbia) RK Vojvodina

Leaving

- (France) Ludovic Fabregas (LP) to (Spain) FC Barcelona
- (Iceland) Aron Pálmarsson (LB) (retires)
- (Russia) Sergei Kosorotov (LB) to (Poland) Wisła Płock
- (Sweden) Lukas Sandell (RB) to (Germany) Rhein-Neckar Löwen
- (Belarus) Mikita Vailupau (RW) to (Portugal) S.L. Benfica
- (Croatia) Nikola Grahovac (LP) to (Germany) HSG Wetzlar
- (Denmark) Mike Jensen (GK) to (Germany) Rhein-Neckar Löwen
- (Spain) Agustín Casado (CB) (to (France) Montpellier Handball)
- (Hungary) Bálint Végh (RW) (on loan to (Hungary) HE-DO B. Braun Gyöngyös)
- (Hungary) Kristóf Palasics (GK) to (Germany) MT Melsungen

=== Staff members ===
- (Hungary) Sports Director: László Nagy
- (Spain) Head Coach: Xavier Pascual Fuertes
- (Spain) Assistant Coach: Antonio Garcia
- (Spain) Video & Analysis: Ivan Pascual Garcia
- (Hungary) Fitness Coach: Péter Kőrösi
- (Hungary) Club Doctor: Tibor Sydó, MD
- (Hungary) Club Doctor: Zsolt Mahunka, MD
- (Serbia) Physiotherapist: Nemanja Vučić
- (North Macedonia) Physiotherapist: Dimitar Manevski

== Retired numbers ==
One Veszprém retired numbers
| N° | Nationality | Player | Position | Tenure |
|---|---|---|---|---|
| 3 | (Hungary) | Péter Gulyás | Right Winger | 2000–2017 |
| 4 | (Hungary) | Gergő Iváncsik | Left Winger | 2000–2017 |
| 6 | (Hungary) | József Éles | Left Back, Central Back | 1990–2003 |
| 7 | (Hungary) | István Gulyás | Central Back | 1985–1999 |
| 8 | (Romania) | Marian Cozma posthumous honor | Line Player | 2006–2009 |
| 10 | (Hungary) (Cuba) | Carlos Pérez | Left Back | 1997–2012 |
| 11 | (Hungary) | István Csoknyai | Left Back | 1990–2005 |
| 14 | (Hungary) | György Zsigmond | Line Player | 1989–1999, 2001–2005 |
| 24 | (Slovenia) | Gašper Marguč | Right Winger | 2014–2026 |

== Honours ==
| Honours | No. | Years |
League
| Nemzeti Bajnokság I Winners | 30 | 1985, 1986, 1991–92, 1992–93, 1993–94, 1994–95, 1996–97, 1997–98, 1998–99, 2000–01, 2001–02, 2002–03, 2003–04, 2004–05, 2005–06, 2007–08, 2008–09, 2009–10, 2010–11, 2011–12, 2012–13, 2013–14, 2014–15, 2015–16, 2016–17, 2018–19, 2022–23, 2023–24, 2024–25 2025-26 |
| Nemzeti Bajnokság I Runners-up | 12 | 1981, 1983, 1987, 1989, 1990, 1991, 1996, 2000, 2007, 2018, 2021, 2022 |
| Nemzeti Bajnokság I Third place | 2 | 1982, 1984 |
| Nemzeti Bajnokság I/B Winners | 1 | 1980 |
Domestic Cups
| Magyar Kupa Winners | 32 | 1984, 1988, 1988–89, 1989–90, 1990–91, 1991–92, 1993–94, 1994–95, 1995–96, 1997–98, 1998–99, 1999–00, 2001–02, 2002–03, 2003–04, 2004–05, 2006–07, 2008–09, 2009–10, 2010–11, 2011–12, 2012–13, 2013–14, 2014–15, 2015–16, 2016–17, 2017–18, 2020–21, 2021–22, 2022–23, 2023–24, 2025–26 |
| Magyar Kupa Runners-up | 11 | 1982, 1983 dec. 1986, 1987, 1992–93, 1996–97, 2000–01, 2005–06, 2007–08, 2018–19, 2024–25 |
| Magyar Kupa Third place | 2 | 1981, 1983 jan. |
Best European Results
| EHF Champions League Finalist | 4 | 2001–02, 2014–15, 2015–16, 2018–19 |
| EHF Cup Winners' Cup Winners | 2 | 1991–92, 2007–08 |
| EHF Cup Winners' Cup Finalist | 2 | 1992–93, 1996–97 |
| EHF Champions Trophy Finalist | 2 | 2002, 2008 |
| SEHA League Winners | 5 | 2014–15, 2015–16, 2019–20, 2020–21, 2021–22 |
| SEHA League Finalist | 1 | 2016–17 |
Best World Results
| IHF Super Globe | 2 | 2024, 2026 |
| IHF Super Globe Finalist | 2 | 2015, 2025 |

=== Individual awards ===
- Double

Winners (20): 1991–92, 1993–94, 1994–95, 1997–98, 1998–99, 2001–02, 2002–03, 2003–04, 2004–05, 2008–09, 2009–10, 2010–11, 2011–12, 2012–13, 2013–14, 2014–15, 2015–16, 2016–17, 2022–23, 2023–24

==== Domestic ====
Nemzeti Bajnokság I Top Scorer

| Season | Name | Goals |
|---|---|---|
| 1997–98 | (Hungary) József Éles | |
| 2011–12 | (Serbia) Marko Vujin | |

== Seasons ==
=== Season to season ===
As of 15 June 2025

- Seasons in Nemzeti Bajnokság I: 45
- Seasons in Nemzeti Bajnokság I/B: 1
- Seasons in Nemzeti Bajnokság II: 1

| Season | Tier | Division | Place | Magyar Kupa |
|---|---|---|---|---|
| 1978 | 4 | MB I | 1st | |
| 1979 | 3 | NB II Nyugat | 1st | |
| 1980 | 2 | NB I/B | 1st | |
| 1981 | 1 | NB I | Runners-up | Third place |
| 1982 | 1 | NB I | Third place | Finalist |
| 1983 | 1 | NB I | Runners-up | Third place* |
| 1983 | 1 | NB I | Runners-up | Finalist* |
| 1984 | 1 | NB I | Third place | Winners |
| 1985 | 1 | NB I | Champions | |
| 1986 | 1 | NB I | Champions | Finalist |
| 1987 | 1 | NB I | Runners-up | Finalist |
| only Magyar Kupa was held in 1988 | | | | Winners |
| 1988–89 | 1 | NB I | Runners-up | Winners |
| 1989–90 | 1 | NB I | Runners-up | Winners |
| 1990–91 | 1 | NB I | Runners-up | Winners |
| 1991–92 | 1 | NB I | Champions | Winners |
| 1992–93 | 1 | NB I | Champions | Finalist |

| Season | Tier | Division | Place | Magyar Kupa |
|---|---|---|---|---|
| 1993–94 | 1 | NB I | Champions | Winners |
| 1994–95 | 1 | NB I | Champions | Winnes |
| 1995–96 | 1 | NB I | Runners-up | Winners |
| 1996–97 | 1 | NB I | Champions | Finalist |
| 1997–98 | 1 | NB I | Champions | Winners |
| 1998–99 | 1 | NB I | Champions | Winners |
| 1999–00 | 1 | NB I | Runners-up | Winners |
| 2000–01 | 1 | NB I | Champions | Finalist |
| 2001–02 | 1 | NB I | Champions | Winners |
| 2002–03 | 1 | NB I | Champions | Winners |
| 2003–04 | 1 | NB I | Champions | Winners |
| 2004–05 | 1 | NB I | Champions | Winners |
| 2005–06 | 1 | NB I | Champions | Finalist |
| 2006–07 | 1 | NB I | Runners-up | Winners |
| 2007–08 | 1 | NB I | Champions | Finalist |
| 2008–09 | 1 | NB I | Champions | Winners |
| 2009–10 | 1 | NB I | Champions | Winners |

| Season | Tier | Division | Place | Magyar Kupa |
|---|---|---|---|---|
| 2010–11 | 1 | NB I | Champions | Winners |
| 2011–12 | 1 | NB I | Champions | Winners |
| 2012–13 | 1 | NB I | Champions | Winners |
| 2013–14 | 1 | NB I | Champions | Winners |
| 2014–15 | 1 | NB I | Champions | Winners |
| 2015–16 | 1 | NB I | Champions | Winners |
| 2016–17 | 1 | NB I | Champions | Winners |
| 2017–18 | 1 | NB I | Runners-up | Winners |
| 2018–19 | 1 | NB I | Champion | Finalist |
| 2019–20 | 1 | NB I | Cancelled due COVID-19 | |
| 2020–21 | 1 | NB I | Runners-up | Winners |
| 2021–22 | 1 | NB I | Runners-up | Winners |
| 2022–23 | 1 | NB I | Champions | Winners |
| 2023–24 | 1 | NB I | Champions | Winners |
| 2024–25 | 1 | NB I | Champions | Finalist |
| 2025–26 | 1 | NB I | | Winners |

=== In European competition ===
- Participations in Champions League (Champions Cup): 27×
- Participations in Cup Winners' Cup (IHF Cup Winners' Cup): 10×

| Season | Competition | Round | Club | Home | Away | Aggregate |
|---|---|---|---|---|---|---|
| 2024–25 | EHF Champions League | Group matches (Group A) | (France) Paris Saint-Germain | 41–28 | 33–37 | 1st place |
| 2024–25 | EHF Champions League | Group matches (Group A) | (Portugal) Sporting CP | 33–32 | 39–30 | 1st place |
| 2024–25 | EHF Champions League | Group matches (Group A) | (Germany) Füchse Berlin | 32–33 | 31–32 | 1st place |
| 2024–25 | EHF Champions League | Group matches (Group A) | (Poland) Orlen Wisła Płock | 30–26 | 24–27 | 1st place |
| 2024–25 | EHF Champions League | Group matches (Group A) | (Romania) Dinamo București | 36–24 | 26–33 | 1st place |
| 2024–25 | EHF Champions League | Group matches (Group A) | (North Macedonia) Eurofarm Pelister | 33–26 | 23–30 | 1st place |
| 2024–25 | EHF Champions League | Group matches (Group A) | (Denmark) Fredericia HK | 34–32 | 31–40 | 1st place |
| 2024–25 | EHF Champions League | Quarter-finals | (Germany) SC Magdeburg | 27–28 | 27–27 | 54–55 |

==== EHF ranking ====
As of 25 September 2025

| Rank | Team | Points |
|---|---|---|
| 2 | (Spain) FC Barcelona | 649 |
| 3 | (Germany) Füchse Berlin | 607 |
| 4 | (Hungary) One Veszprém | 516 |
| 5 | (Germany) SG Flensburg-Handewitt | 511 |
| 6 | (Denmark) Aalborg Håndbold | 509 |
| 7 | (France) HBC Nantes | 489 |
| 8 | (Germany) THW Kiel | 485 |

== Former club members ==
=== Selected former players ===
- (Hungary) Csaba Bartók (2002–2004)
- (Hungary) Dániel Buday (2003–2007)
- (Hungary) Gábor Császár (2010–2013)
- (Hungary) István Csoknyai (1990–2005)
- (Hungary) József Éles (1990–2003)
- (Hungary) Nándor Fazekas (1994–1997, 1998–2004, 2009–2014)
- (Hungary) Gyula Gál (2001–2009)
- (Hungary) István Gulyás (1985–1999)
- (Hungary) Péter Gulyás (2000–2017)
- (Hungary) János Gyurka (1979–1991, 1993–1997)
- (Hungary) Ferenc Ilyés (2007–2009, 2011–2012)
- (Hungary) Gergő Iváncsik (2000–2017)
- (Hungary) Tamás Iváncsik (2007–2014)
- (Hungary) Lajos Keller (1980–1986)
- (Hungary) Balázs Laluska (2010–2014)
- (Hungary) Máté Lékai (2014–2022)
- (Hungary) Richárd Mezei (1997–2001)
- (Hungary) Roland Mikler (2014–2019)
- (Hungary) Tamás Mocsai (2013–2014)
- (Hungary) László Nagy (2012–2019)
- (Hungary) Károly Pardi (1980–1989)
- (Hungary) István Pásztor (1993–2008)
- (Hungary) Jenő Putics (1987–1990)
- (Hungary) Timuzsin Schuch (2011–2018)
- (Hungary) János Szathmári (1995–2001)
- (Hungary) József Végh (1982–1990)
- (Hungary) György Zsigmond (1989–1999, 2001–2005)
- (Hungary) (Serbia) Nikola Eklemović (2004–2011)
- (Hungary) (Cuba) Ivo Díaz (1999–2005)
- (Hungary) (Cuba) Carlos Pérez (1997–2013)
- (Serbia and Montenegro) (Spain) Árpád Sterbik (2001–2004, 2018–2020)
- (Iran) (Hungary) Iman Jamali (2012–2015, 2017–2019)
- (Bosnia and Herzegovina) Mirsad Terzić (2009–2020)
- (Chile) Marco Oneto (2012–2013)
- (France) Ludovic Fabregas (2023–2025)
- (France) Kentin Mahé (2018–2024)
- (France) William Accambray (2017–2019)
- (Serbia) Vladimir Cupara (2019–2023)
- (Serbia) Dalibor Čutura (1998–1999)
- (Serbia) Momir Ilić (2013–2019)
- (Serbia) Ivan Lapčević (2005–2010)
- (Serbia) Petar Nenadić (2018–2023)
- (Serbia) Žarko Šešum (2007–2010)
- (Serbia) Dejan Perić (2006–2011)
- (Serbia) Marko Vujin (2006–2012)
- (Croatia) Zlatko Saračević (2000–2002)
- (Croatia) Mirza Džomba (2001–2004)
- (Croatia) Slavko Goluža (2003–2004)
- (Croatia) Božidar Jović (2000–2003)
- (Croatia) Vlado Šola (2004–2006)
- (Croatia) Marko Kopljar (2016–2017)
- (Croatia) Mirko Alilović (2011–2018)
- (Croatia) Ivan Slišković (2015–2017)
- (Croatia) Renato Sulić (2004–2005, 2009–2018)
- (Croatia) Manuel Štrlek (2018–2023)
- (Spain) Isaías Guardiola (2016)
- (Spain) Chema Rodríguez (2012–2017)
- (Spain) Carlos Ruesga (2013–2015)
- (Spain) Cristian Ugalde (2012–2018)
- (Spain) Jorge Maqueda (2020–2022)
- (Spain) Agustín Casado (2023–2025)
- (Spain) Rodrigo Corrales (2020–2026)
- (Slovenia) Blaž Blagotinšek (2016–2022)
- (Slovenia) Dragan Gajić (2016–2020)
- (Slovenia) Borut Mačkovšek (2018–2020)
- (Slovenia) Gašper Marguč (2014–2026)
- (North Macedonia) Kiril Lazarov (2002–2007)
- (North Macedonia) Dejan Manaskov (2017–2022)
- (Norway) Bjarte Myrhol (2005–2006)
- (Norway) Kent Robin Tønnesen (2017–2021)
- (Denmark) Rasmus Lauge (2019–2023)
- (Denmark) René Toft Hansen (2018–2019)
- (Denmark) Nikolaj Markussen (2019–2021)
- (Iceland) Aron Pálmarsson (2015–2017, 2024–2025)
- (Iceland) Bjarki Már Elísson (2022–2026)
- (Romania) Marian Cozma (2006–2009)
- (Russia) Evgeny Lushnikov (2004–2011)
- (Russia) Daniil Shishkaryov (2019–2021)
- (Russia) Inal Aflitulin (2016–2017)
- (Russia) Sergei Kosorotov (2023–2025)
- (Germany) Christian Zeitz (2014–2016)
- (Czech Republic) (Slovakia) Ľubomír Švajlen (1992–1998)
- (Montenegro) (Qatar) Žarko Marković (2007–2009)
- (Montenegro) Vuko Borozan (2019–2021)
- (Sweden) Andreas Nilsson (2014–2024)
- (Egypt) Yahia Omar (2019–2024)
- (Brazil) Rogério Moraes Ferreira (2019–2021)
- (Poland) Paweł Paczkowski (2019–2020)

=== Notable coaches ===
- (Hungary) Attila Joósz (1991–1995)
- (Hungary) Szilárd Kiss (1995)
- (Hungary) Pál Kocsis (1995–1996)
- (Hungary) Sándor Vass (1996–1997)
- (Hungary) dr. László Hoffmann
- (Hungary) Sándor Kaló
- (Hungary) László Kovács (1999–2000)
- (Croatia) Zdravko Zovko (2000–2007)
- (Hungary) Lajos Mocsai (2007–2012)
- (Spain) Antonio Carlos Ortega (2012–2015)
- (Spain) Xavi Sabaté (2015–2017)
- (Sweden) Ljubomir Vranjes (2017–2018)
- (Spain) David Davis (2018–2021)
- (Serbia) Momir Ilić (2021–2024)
- (Spain) Xavier Pascual Fuertes (2024–)
