= István Csoknyai =

Hungarian handball player (born 1964)

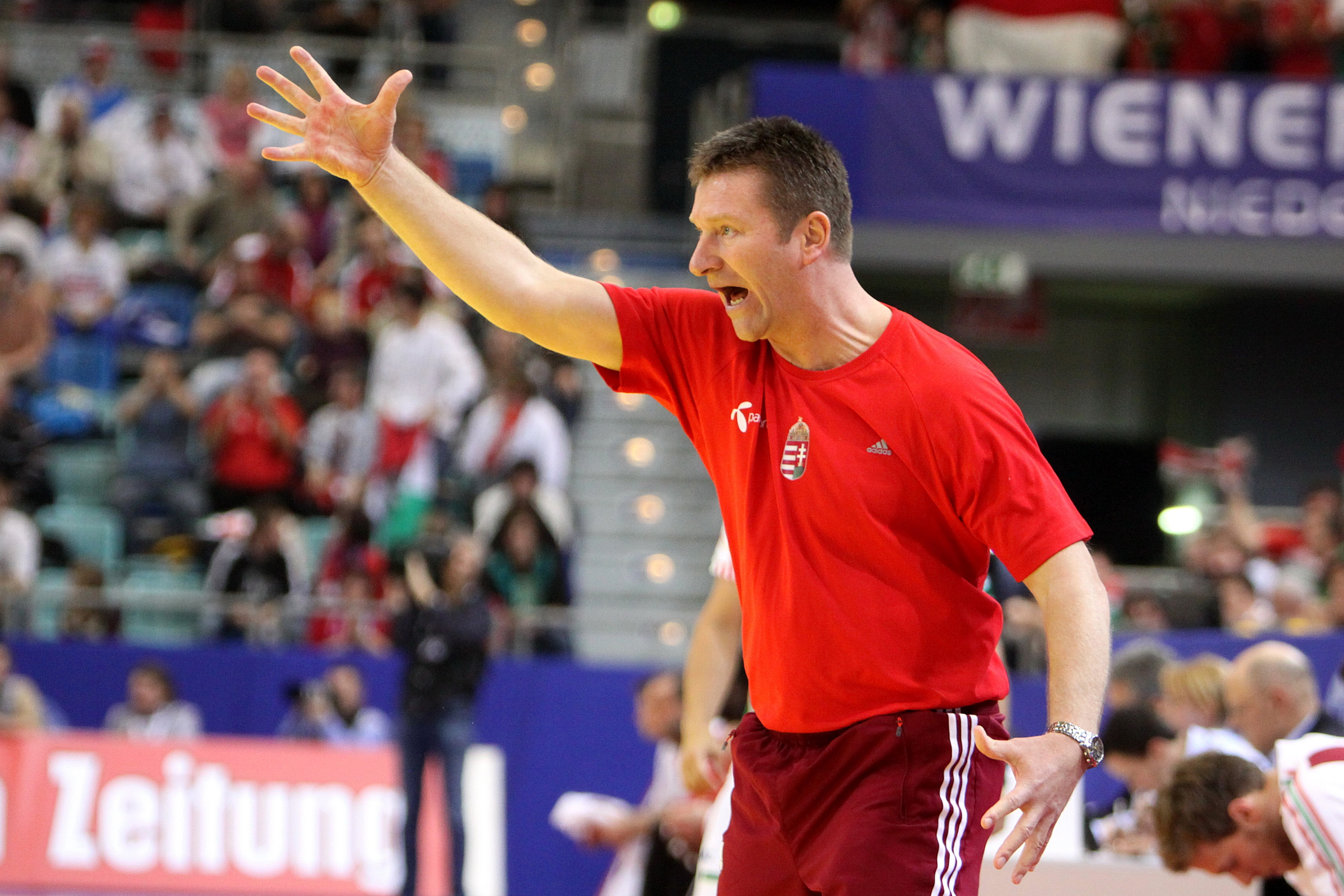

Personal information
- Nationality: Hungarian
- Born: 24 October 1964 (age 61) Dunaújváros, Hungary
- Height: 2.01 m (6 ft 7 in)

Sport
- Sport: Handball
- Current club: Balatonfüredi KSE (manager)

Senior clubs
- Years: Team
- 1983–1990: Dunaferr SE
- 1985–1986: → Honvéd Szondi SE (loan)
- 1990–2005: KC Veszprém
National team
Years	Team	Apps	(Gls)
1991–2004	Hungary	170	(168)

Teams managed
- 2009–2010: Hungary
- 2014–: Balatonfüredi KSE
- 2018–2019: Hungary

István Csoknyai (Hungarian: [ˈiʃtvaːn ˈt͡ʃokɲɒi]; born 24 October 1964) is a Hungarian former international handball player and the head coach of Balatonfüredi KSE.

== Career ==
=== Club ===
Csoknyai started his career by his hometown club Dunaferr SE in 1983, and except a short spell at Honvéd Szondi SE he stayed until 1990. Dunaferr was a yo-yo club that period and Csoknyai has experienced three relegations (1984, 1986, 1989) and three promotions (1983, 1985, 1987) during his time at the club. Despite playing for a struggling team, his impressive display have convinced KC Veszprém of being a quality player, and the Transdanubians have moved on to sign the back player.

Csoknyai spent fifteen seasons with Veszprém and played a major role in the success story of the team, that have gained near total domination in domestic competitions and also became a top club on continental level. He has won twelve Hungarian championship and as many Hungarian cup titles in these years, completing his collection with an EHF Cup Winners' Cup gold medal. In 2002, he was close to take the most prestigious continental event, the EHF Champions League trophy as well, but Veszprém fell short to SC Magdeburg in the finals.

Three years later, at the age of 40, he finally gave up playing professional handball. He has hold the record of most domestic league and cup titles and most league and continental competition matches amongst the Hungarian players when retired.

Csoknyai did not stay away entirely from the sport, as he took the assistant coach position of Veszprém after his retirement. In 2014 Csoknyai became the head coach of Balatonfüredi KSE, an affiliate team of Veszprém, and took a number of youngsters with him.

From September 2009 to July 2010 he also worked as the head coach of the Hungarian men's national handball team, but under his guidance the team did not perform as it was expected and achieved only a disappointing fourteenth place on the 2010 European Championship.

In 2018, he was appointed again as the coach of the Hungarian national team along with Vladan Matić.

=== International ===
Csoknyai, who has been capped 170 times for Hungary, made his international debut on 13 June 1991 against Austria. He participated on the 1992 Summer Olympics a year later, where he played on five games and scored six goals.

He took part on three World Championships (1993, 1997, 1999), capturing the best result in 1997 by finishing fourth. Csoknyai was also present on the European Championship three times in row between 1994 and 1998, achieving a seventh, a tenth and a sixth place, respectively.

He has ended his long international career on 6 June 2004 with a match against Norway.

== Personal ==
He is married and has three children, two son, Balázs (b. 1987) and Ádám (b. 1989) and a daughter, Nóra (b. 1994). All three are handball players.

== Achievements ==
- Nemzeti Bajnokság I:
  - Winner: 1992, 1993, 1994, 1995, 1997, 1998, 1999, 2001, 2002, 2003, 2004, 2005
- Magyar Kupa:
  - Winner: 1992, 1993, 1994, 1995, 1996, 1998, 1999, 2000, 2002, 2003, 2004, 2005
- EHF Champions League:
  - Finalist: 2002
- EHF Cup Winners' Cup:
  - Winner: 1992
  - Finalist: 1993, 1997
- EHF Champions Trophy:
  - Finalist: 2002, 2008

== Individual awards ==
- Pro Urbe Prize (1992, 2002)
- Life Achievement Award of Veszprém County (2004)
