= Mirko Alilović =

Croatian handball player (born 1985)

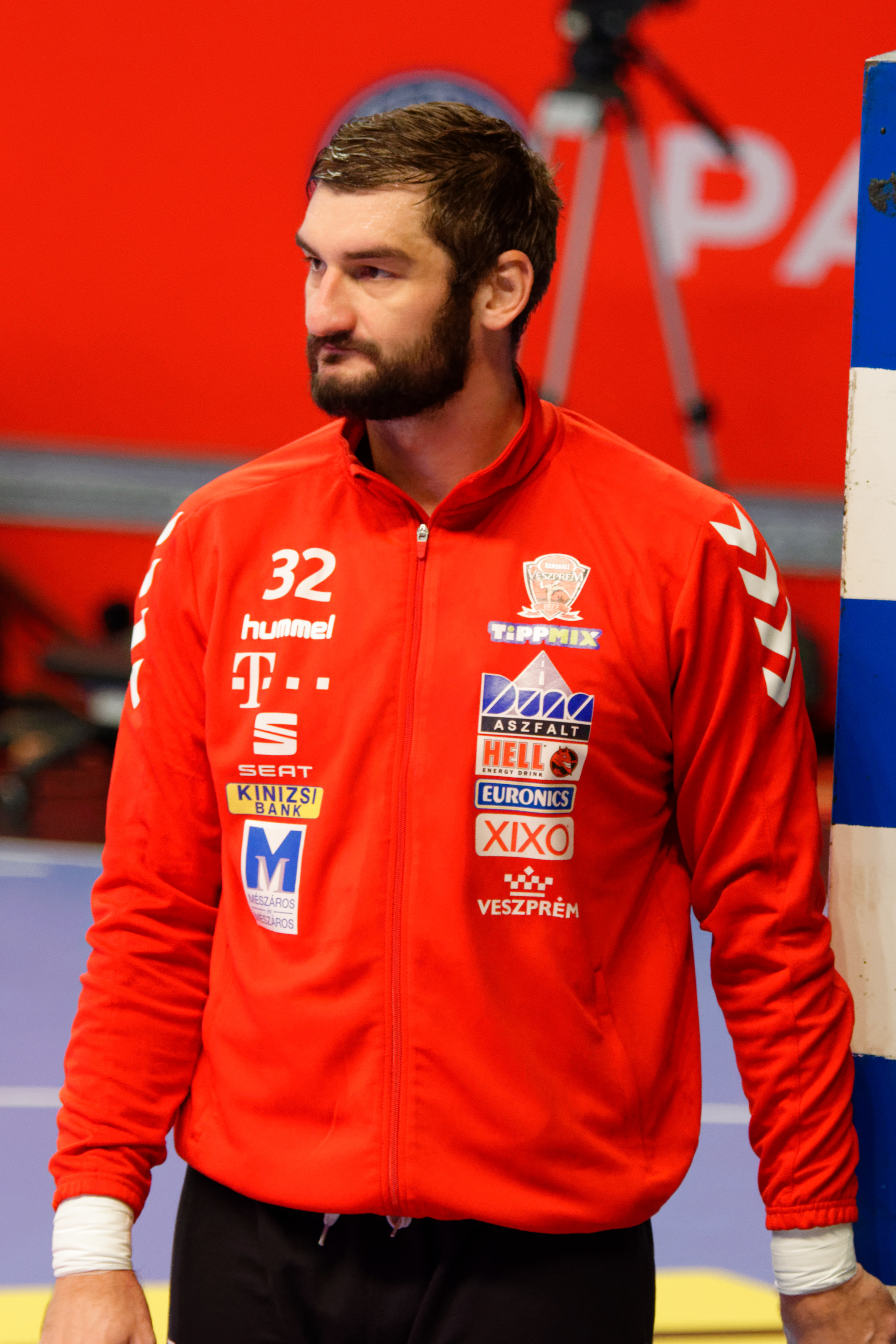

Personal information
- Nationality: Croatian
- Born: 15 September 1985 (age 41) Ljubuški, SFR Yugoslavia
- Height: 2.00 m (6 ft 7 in)

Sport
- Sport: Handball
- Position: Goalkeeper
- Current club: SC Pick Szeged
- Number: 32

Senior clubs
- Years: Team
- 2000–2005: HRK Izviđač
- 2005–2010: CB Ademar León
- 2010–2011: RK Celje
- 2011–2018: Telekom Veszprém
- 2018–2023: SC Pick Szeged
- 2023–: Wisła Płock
National team
| Years | Team | Apps | (Gls) |
| 2006–2007 | Bosnia and Herzegovina | 4 | (0) |
| 2008–2022 | Croatia | 164 | (0) |
Medal record
Olympic Games
| Bronze medal – third place | 2012 London | Team |
World Championships
| Silver medal – second place | 2009 Croatia |
| Bronze medal – third place | 2013 Spain |
European Championships
| Silver medal – second place | 2008 Norway |
| Silver medal – second place | 2010 Austria |
| Bronze medal – third place | 2012 Serbia |
| Bronze medal – third place | 2016 Poland |

Mirko Alilović (born 15 September 1985) is a Croatian handball goalkeeper for Wisła Płock. He began his senior handball career in Bosnia and Herzegovina and has played for clubs in Spain, Slovenia, Hungary and Poland.

Alilović made his debut for the Croatia men's national handball team in 2008 and was capped 164 times until his international retirement in 2022. He won a World Championship silver and bronze medal, two European Championship silver and bronze medals each, and the bronze medal at the 2012 Summer Olympics with the national team.

Alilović was named the best athlete from Ljubuški, Bosnia and Herzegovina in 2007 and was capped 4 times for Bosnia and Herzegovina men's national handball team from 2006 to 2007.

== Honours ==
=== Club ===
- Nemzeti Bajnokság I:
  - Winner: 2012, 2013, 2014, 2015, 2016, 2017, 2021, 2022
- Magyar Kupa:
  - Winner: 2012, 2013, 2014, 2015, 2016, 2017, 2018, 2019
- Polish Superliga
  - Winner: 2024, 2025
- Polish Cup
  - Winner: 2024
- EHF Champions League:
  - Finalist: 2015, 2016
  - Semifinalist: 2014

=== International ===
- World Championship:
  - Silver Medalist: 2009
  - Bronze Medalist: 2013
- European Championship:
  - Silver Medalist: 2008, 2010
  - Bronze Medalist: 2012, 2016
