= Péter Gulyás =

Hungarian handball player (born 1984)

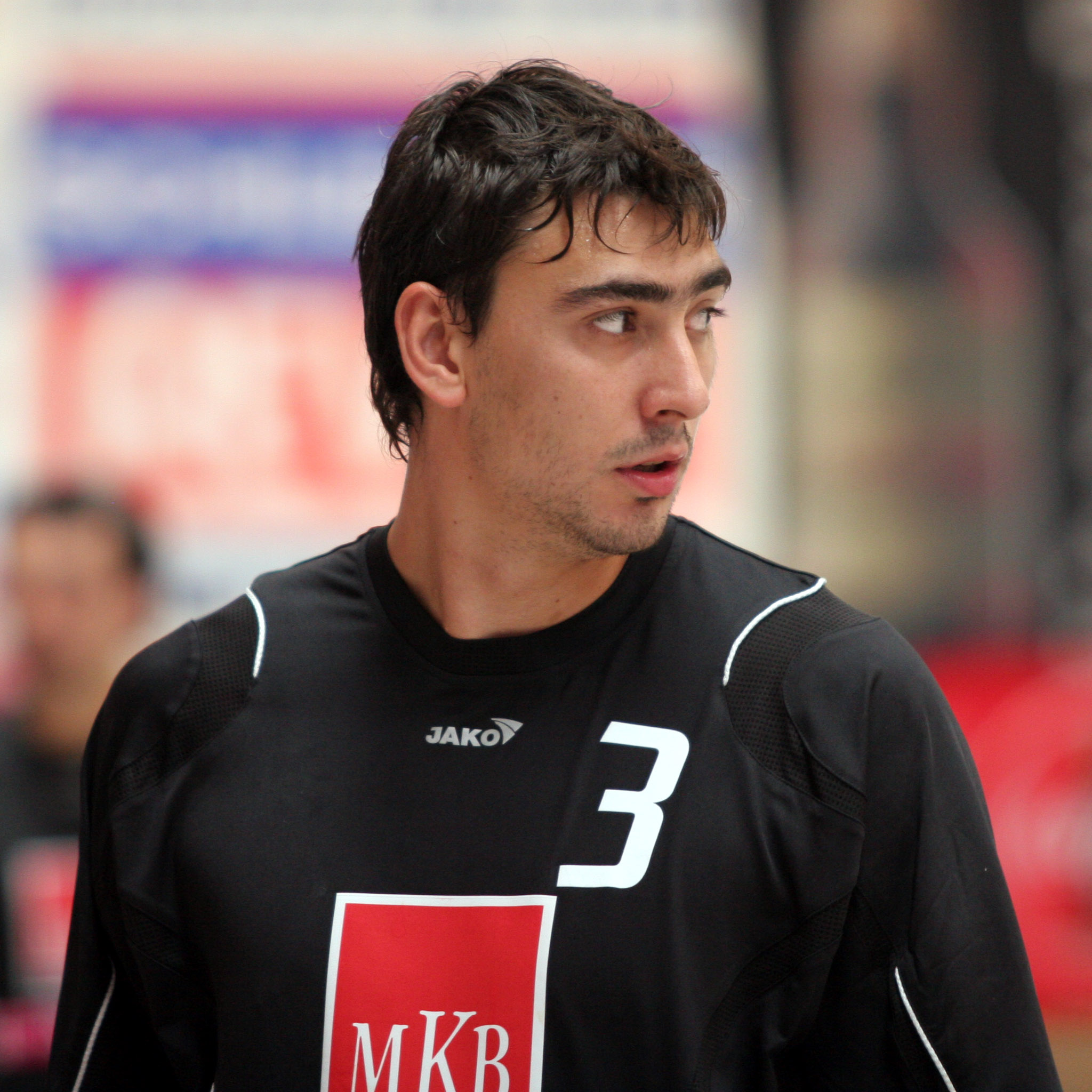

Personal information
- Nationality: Hungarian
- Born: 4 March 1984 (age 42) Veszprém, Hungary
- Height: 2.00 m (6 ft 7 in)

Sport
- Sport: Handball
- Position: Right wing
- Current club: Retired

Youth career
- Years: Team
- –2000: Veszprém KC

Senior clubs
- Years: Team
- 2000–2017: Telekom Veszprém
- 2002–2003: → Nagykanizsai Izzó SE (loan)
- 2003–2005: → Balatoni KC
National team
| Years | Team | Apps | (Gls) |
| 2006–2017 | Hungary | 108 | (214) |

Teams managed
- 2024–: Dunaújváros (w)
Medal record
Junior World Championship
| Bronze medal – third place | 2005 Hungary |

Péter Gulyás (born 4 March 1984) is former a Hungarian handballer who played for Telekom Veszprém and for the Hungarian national team.

He took part in an Olympic Games (2012), two European Championships (2008, 2010) and also participated in the World Championship in 2011. He retired from handball in 2017. Currently he is the coach of Dunaújváros women handball club.

== Achievements ==
- Nemzeti Bajnokság I:
  - Winner (13): 2001, 2002, 2006, 2008, 2009, 2010, 2011, 2012, 2013, 2014, 2015, 2016, 2017
  - Silver Medalist: 2007
- Magyar Kupa:
  - Winner (10): 2002, 2007, 2009, 2010, 2012, 2013, 2014, 2015, 2016, 2017
- EHF Champions League:
  - Finalist: 2015
  - Semifinalist: 2003, 2006, 2014
- EHF Cup Winners' Cup:
  - Winner: 2008
- EHF Champions Trophy:
  - Finalist: 2008
- Junior World Championship:
  - Bronze Medalist: 2005

== Individual awards ==
- Silver Cross of the Cross of Merit of the Republic of Hungary (2012)
