= Iman Jamali =

Iranian-Hungarian handball player (born 1991)

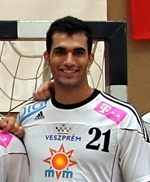

Personal information
- Full name: Iman Jamali Mourchegani
- Nationality: Iranian/Hungarian
- Born: 11 October 1991 (age 35) Isfahan, Iran
- Height: 2.00 m (6 ft 7 in)

Sport
- Sport: Handball
- Position: Left back
- Current club: SKIF Krasnodar
- Number: 30

Senior clubs
- Years: Team
- 2009–2012: Foolad Sepahan
- 2012–2019: Telekom Veszprém
- 2015–2016: → IFK Kristianstad (loan)
- 2016–2017: → HC Meshkov Brest (loan)
- 2019–2020: Dinamo București
- 2022–2023: Ceglédi KKSE
- 2023: Tatabánya KC
- 2023: → Shabab Haret Saida (loan)
- 2024: Al Safa
- 2025–: SKIF Krasnodar
National team
Years	Team		
2010–2012	Iran		
2015–	Hungary	36	(90)

Iman Jamali Moorchegani (Persian: ایمان جمالی مورچه‌گانی, Hungarian: Imán Dzsamáli, born 11 October 1991) is an Iranian-born Hungarian handball player who plays for SKIF Krasnodar and the Hungarian national team.

He represented Hungary at the 2019 World Men's Handball Championship.
