= Magyar Kupa (men's handball) =

Hungarian men's handball competition

Magyar Kupa (English: Hungarian Cup) is the main domestic cup for Hungarian men's team handball clubs, which is organized and supervised by the Hungarian Handball Federation. The competition is held annually, starting in September and concluding in April. The teams play in a one-leg knockout system with a final four tournament in the end. The winner of the Hungarian cup get the right to participate in the next year's EHF Cup Winners' Cup, unless they secure a place in the EHF Champions League. If happens so, then the runners-up take the opportunity to represent Hungary in the forthcoming continental event for cup winners.

== Winners ==
In 1954, 1955 and 1957, the cup was held on a grand scale. In 1983 they played two series (in March and December). In 1967 and 1968 the finals were played only in the following year. Previous cup winners are:

- 1951: Újpest
- 1952: Bp. Honvéd
- 1953: Vörös Meteor
- 1954: Csepel
- 1955: Vasas
- 1956: Újpest
- 1957: Csepel
- 1958–62: Not Played
- 1963: Ferencváros
- 1964: Bp. Honvéd
- 1965: Bp. Spartacus
- 1966: Bp. Spartacus
- 1967: Bp. Honvéd
- 1968: Bp. Honvéd
- 1969: Tatabánya
- 1970: Bp. Spartacus
- 1971: Bp. Honvéd
- 1972: Bp. Honvéd
- 1973: Győri ETO
- 1974: Vasas
- 1975: Not Played
- 1976: Elektromos
- 1977: Szeged
- 1978: Tatabánya
- 1979: Debreceni Dózsa
- 1980: Elektromos
- 1981: Elektromos
- 1982: Szeged
- 1983 mar.: Szeged
- 1983 dec.: Bp. Honvéd
- 1984: Veszprém
- 1985: Győri ETO
- 1986: Győri ETO
- 1987: Győri ETO
- 1988: Veszprém
- 1988/89: Veszprém
- 1989/90: Veszprém
- 1990/91: Veszprém
- 1991/92: Veszprém
- 1992/93: Szeged
- 1993/94: Veszprém
- 1994/95: Veszprém
- 1995/96: Veszprém
- 1996/97: Elektromos
- 1997/98: Veszprém
- 1998/99: Veszprém
- 1999/00: Veszprém
- 2000/01: Dunaferr
- 2001/02: Veszprém
- 2002/03: Veszprém
- 2003/04: Veszprém
- 2004/05: Veszprém
- 2005/06: Szeged
- 2007/07: Veszprém
- 2007/08: Szeged
- 2008/09: Veszprém
- 2009/10: Veszprém
- 2010/11: Veszprém
- 2011/12: Veszprém
- 2012/13: Veszprém
- 2013/14: Veszprém
- 2014/15: Veszprém
- 2015/16: Veszprém
- 2016/17: Veszprém
- 2017/18: Veszprém
- 2018/19: Szeged
- 2019/20: Cancelled due to the COVID-19 pandemic
- 2020/21: Veszprém
- 2021/22: Veszprém
- 2022/23: Veszprém
- 2023/24: Veszprém
- 2024/25: Szeged
- 2025/26: Veszprém

=== Finals ===
The following table contains all the finals from the sixty years long history of the Magyar Kupa. In some occasions, there was not held a final match but a final tournament. In these cases, the team with the most total points have been crowned as cup winners.

Key
(R)	Replay
aet	Match went to extra time
p	Match decided by a penalty shootout (after extra time)
‡	Winning team won the Double

Finals of Hungarian Cup
No.	Season	Winners	Score	Runners-up	Hall	Date of final(s)
1st	1951	Újpest	3–1	Vörös Meteor	Sports Hall Court, Budapest	21 October 1951
2nd	1952	Bp. Honvéd	11–7	Csepel	Sports Hall Court, Budapest	6 September 1952
3rd	1953	Vörös Meteor	8–6	Elektromos	Baross street, Budapest	4 July 1953
	1954	Csepel	12–9	Ferencváros	Üllői str., Budapest	28 August 1954
	1955	Vasas	11–5	Ferencváros	Sport str., Budapest	20 August 1955
4th	1956	Újpest	19–18	Bp. Spartacus	Sports Hall Court, Budapest	8 July 1956
	1957	Csepel	8–7	Vasas	Népstadion, Budapest	20 August 1957
No Competitions Held
5th	1963	Ferencváros	11–9	Vasas	Kisstadion, Budapest	17 August 1963
6th	1964	Bp. Honvéd	25−24 (aet)	Bp. Spartacus	Tüzér str., Budapest	20 December 1964
7th	1965	Bp. Spartacus	24–17	Újpest	Tüzér str., Budapest	19 December 1965
8th	1966	Bp. Spartacus	19–15	Vasas	Játékcsarnok, Budapest	18 December 1966
9th	1967	Bp. Honvéd	21–18	Vörös Meteor	Játékcsarnok, Budapest	21 January 1968
10th	1968	Bp. Honvéd	20–14	Csepel	Játékcsarnok, Budapest	26 January 1969
11th	1969	Tatabánya	14–13	Bp. Spartacus	Játékcsarnok, Budapest	27 December 1969
12th	1970	Bp. Spartacus	16–13	Győri ETO	Üllői str., Budapest	20 August 1970
13th	1971	Bp. Honvéd	29–21	Csömör	Tímár str., Budapest	19 August 1971
14th	1972	Bp. Honvéd	22–12	Honvéd Szondi	Játékcsarnok, Budapest	16 December 1972
15th	1973	Győri ETO	18–14	Debreceni Dózsa	Tímár str., Budapest	22 August 1973
16th	1974	Vasas	16–15	Bp. Honvéd	Tímár str., Budapest	20 August 1974
No Competitions Held
17th	1976	Elektromos	29−28 (aet)	Tatabánya	Municipal Sports Hall, Miskolc	20 April 1976
18th	1977	Szeged (7p)	4 roundmatches	Debreceni Dózsa (7p)	Home and Away matches	11 March 1977
19th	1978	Tatabánya (11p)	4 roundmatches	Elektromos (6p)	Home and Away matches	6 April 1978
20th	1979	Debreceni Dózsa	41–38; 26–17 / 15–21	Ferencváros	Municipal Sports Hall, Debrecen; Körcsarnok, Budapest	30 March 1979; 1 April 1979
21st	1980	Elektromos (10p)	4 roundmatches	Bp. Honvéd (8p)	Home and Away matches	9 March 1980
22nd	1981	Tatabánya	47–46; 25–26 / 22–20	Elektromos	Municipal Sports Hall, Tatabánya; Fáy str., Budapest	3 April 1981; 5 April 1981
23rd	1982	Szeged	56–53; 30–22 / 26–31	Veszprém	Municipal Sports Hall, Szeged; March 15 str. Sports Hall, Veszprém	11 April 1982; 14 April 1982
24th	1983 mar.	Szeged (8p)	6 roundmatches	Tatabánya (5p)	Home and Away matches	20 March 1983
25th	1983 dec.	Bp. Honvéd (6p)	3 roundmatches	Veszprém (6p)	Home and Away matches	20 December 1983
26th	1984	Veszprém	58–50; 28–15 / 30–35	Tatabánya	March 15 str. Sports Hall, Veszprém; Municipal Sports Hall, Tatabánya	19 December 1984; 21 December 1984
27th	1985	Győri ETO	38–38 (p); 18–20 / 20–18	Bp. Honvéd	Fáy str., Budapest; Mihály Magvassy Sports Hall, Győr	20 December 1985; 22 December 1985
28th	1986	Győri ETO	52–45; 22–25 / 30–20	Veszprém	March 15 str. Sports Hall, Veszprém; Mihály Magvassy Sports Hall, Győr	19 December 1986; 21 December 1986
29th	1987	Győri ETO	40–34; 19–20 / 21–14	Veszprém	March 15 str. Sports Hall, Veszprém; Mihály Magvassy Sports Hall, Győr	11 September 1987; 13 September 1987
30th	1988	Veszprém	32–30; 10–14 / 22–16	Debreceni Dózsa	Municipal Sports Hall, Debrecen; March 15 str. Sports Hall, Veszprém	27 May 1988; 29 May 1988
31st	1988–89	Veszprém	47–39; 19–22 / 28–17	Tatabánya	Municipal Sports Hall, Tatabánya; March 15 str. Sports Hall, Veszprém	26 May 1989; 28 May 1989
32nd	1989–90	Veszprém	44–34; 21–20 / 23–14	Pemü-Honvéd	Municipal Sports Hall, Solymár; March 15 str. Sports Hall, Veszprém	23 May 1990; 30 May 1990
33rd	1990–91	Veszprém	46–40; 26–20 / 20–20	Győri ETO	March 15 str. Sports Hall, Veszprém; Mihály Magvassy Sports Hall, Győr	4 May 1991; 7 May 1991
34th	1991–92	Veszprém	47–38; 25–16 / 22–22	Győri ETO	March 15 str. Sports Hall, Veszprém; Mihály Magvassy Sports Hall, Győr	24 March 1992; 1 April 1992
35th	1992–93	Szeged	43–40; 23–21 / 20–19	Veszprém	Municipal Sports Hall, Szeged; March 15 str. Sports Hall, Veszprém	20 June 1993; 23 June 1993
36th	1993–94	Veszprém	43–39; 23–17 / 20–22	Elektromos	March 15 str. Sports Hall, Veszprém; Népfürdő str., Budapest	22 April 1994; 25 April 1994
37th	1994–95	Veszprém	44–40; 22–24 / 23–16	Győri ETO	March 15 str. Sports Hall, Veszprém; Mihály Magvassy Sports Hall, Győr	29 March 1995; 5 April 1995
38th	1995–96	Veszprém	17–15	Szeged	Körcsarnok, Budapest	17 June 1996
39th	1996–97	Elektromos	28–26 (p)	Veszprém	Municipal Sports Hall, Százhalombatta	30 March 1997
40th	1997–98	Veszprém	25–21	Elektromos	Körcsarnok, Budapest	12 April 1998
41st	1998–99	Veszprém	25–23	Dunaferr	Fáy str., Budapest	25 April 1999
42nd	1999–00	Veszprém	20–19	Szeged	Fáy str., Budapest	15 May 2000
43rd	2000–01	Dunaferr	22–21 (p)	Veszprém	Fáy str., Budapest	17 May 2001
44th	2001–02	Veszprém	25–22	Szeged	Tiszaliget Sports Hall, Szolnok	19 May 2002
45th	2002–03	Veszprém	30–28	Szeged	Tiszaliget Sports Hall, Szolnok	25 May 2003
46th	2003–04	Veszprém	29–24	Szeged	Tiszaliget Sports Hall, Szolnok	22 May 2004
47th	2004–05	Veszprém	28–24	Szeged	Balaton Leisure and Conference Center, Balatonfüred	28 May 2005
48th	2005–06	Szeged	32–30	Veszprém	Lauber Dezső Sports Hall, Pécs	28 May 2006
49th	2006–07	Veszprém	34–31	Dunaferr	Balaton Leisure and Conference Center, Balatonfüred	15 April 2007
50th	2007–08	Szeged	27–22	Veszprém	Municipal Sports Hall, Szeged	20 April 2008
51st	2008–09	Veszprém	32–23	Szeged	SYMA Centre, Budapest	19 April 2009
52nd	2009–10	Veszprém	27–27 (3-2 p)	Szeged	Balaton Leisure and Conference Center, Balatonfüred	10 April 2010
53rd	2010–11	Veszprém	37–19	PLER	Pestszentimre Sports Palace, Budapest	17 April 2011
54th	2011–12	Veszprém	27–26	Szeged	Sportmax2, Budapest	15 April 2012
55th	2012–13	Veszprém	36–30	Szeged	Lauber Dezső Sports Hall, Pécs	14 April 2013
56th	2013–14	Veszprém	27–21	Szeged	Lauber Dezső Sports Hall, Pécs	13 April 2014
57th	2014–15	Veszprém	26–22	Szeged	Lauber Dezső Sports Hall, Pécs	26 April 2015
58th	2015–16	Veszprém	24–24 (3-2 p)	Szeged	Főnix Hall, Debrecen	17 April 2016
59th	2016–17	Veszprém	23–22	Szeged	Főnix Hall, Debrecen	15 April 2017
60th	2017–18	Veszprém	23–21	Szeged	Főnix Hall, Debrecen	15 April 2018
61st	2018–19	Szeged	28–27	Veszprém	Főnix Hall, Debrecen	7 April 2019
63rd	2020–21	Veszprém	28–26	Szeged	Városi Sportcsarnok, Szigetszentmiklós	12 April 2021
64th	2021–22	Telekom Veszprém	42–19	Fejér-B.Á.L. Veszprém	Audi Aréna, Győr	24 April 2022
65th	2022–23	Veszprém	35–32	Szeged	Audi Aréna, Győr	9 April 2023
66th	2023–24	Veszprém	33–30	Szeged	Tatabányai Multifunkcionális Sportcsarnok, Tatabánya	19 May 2024
67th	2024–25	Szeged	31–30	Veszprém	Tatabányai Multifunkcionális Sportcsarnok, Tatabánya	13 April 2025
68th	2025–26	Veszprém	34–22	Tatabánya	Audi Aréna, Győr	19 April 2026

== Performances ==
=== By club ===
The performance of various clubs is shown in the following table:

Club	Titles	Runners-up	Winning years
Veszprém (Note: Includes Veszprémi Építők, Veszprémi ÁÉV-Bramac SE, Bramac Veszprémi SE, Fotex Veszprémi SE, MKB Veszprém KC, MKB-MVM Veszprém KC, MVM Veszprém KC, and Telekom Veszprém.)	**32**	11	1984, 1988, 1988–89, 1989–90, 1990–91, 1991–92, 1993–94, 1994–95, 1995–96, 1997–98, 1998–99, 1999–00, 2001–02, 2002–03, 2003–04, 2004–05, 2006–07, 2008–09, 2009–10, 2010–11, 2011–12, 2012–13, 2013–14, 2014–15, 2015–16, 2016–17, 2017–18, 2020–21, 2021–22, 2022–23, 2023–24, 2025–26
Szeged (Note: Includes Szegedi Volán, Pick Szeged and MOL-Pick Szeged.)	**8**	18	1977, 1982, 1983 mar., 1992–93, 2005–06, 2007–08, 2018–19, 2024–25
Bp. Honvéd	**7**	4	1952, 1964, 1967, 1968, 1971, 1972, 1983 dec.
Győri ETO (Note: Includes Rába ETO, Győri Rába ETO and Győri Gardénia ETO KC.)	**4**	4	1973, 1985, 1986, 1987
PLER Budapest (Note: Includes Elektromos SE and PLER KC.)	**4**	5	1976, 1980, 1981, 1996–97
Bp. Spartacus	**3**	3	1965, 1966, 1970
Újpest (Note: Includes Bp. Dózsa, Újpesti Dózsa and Újpesti TE.)	**2**	1	1951, 1956
Tatabánya (Note: Includes Tatabányai Bányász and Tatabányai KC.)	**2**	6	1969, 1978
Vörös Meteor (Note: Includes VM Közért.)	**1**	2	1953
Ferencváros (Note: Includes Bp. Kinizsi.)	**1**	0	1963
Vasas	**1**	2	1974
Debreceni Dózsa	**1**	3	1979
Dunaferr	**1**	2	2000–01
Csepel	–	2	-
Csömör	–	1	-
Honvéd Szondi	–	1	-
Veszprém KKFT Felsőörs	–	1	-

=== By county ===
County	Titles	Winning clubs
Veszprém	31	**Veszprém** (31)
Budapest	19	Honvéd (7), Elektromos (4), Spartacus (3), Újpest (2), Vörös Meteor (1), **Ferencváros** (1), Vasas (1)
Csongrád	8	**Szeged** (8)
Győr-Moson-Sopron	4	Győri ETO (4)
Komárom-Esztergom	2	**Tatabánya** (2)
Hajdú-Bihar	1	Debreceni Dózsa (1)
Fejér	1	Dunaferr (1)

- The bolded teams are currently playing in the 2018-19 season of the Hungarian League.

== Sponsorship ==
Period	Sponsor	Name
– 2015/16	Bomba!	BOMBA! férfi Magyar kupa
2016/17 –	TippMix	TippMix férfi Magyar kupa

== See also ==
- Nemzeti Bajnokság I (National Championship of Hungary)
- Hungarian handball clubs in European competitions
