= 2022–23 Veszprém KC season =

Telekom Veszprém
2022–23 season
- CEO: Dr. Zoltán Csík
- Head coach: (Serbia) Momir Ilić
- Nemzeti Bajnokság I: 2nd
- Hungarian Cup: Pre-season
- SEHA League: Quarter-finals
- EHF Champions League: Group stage
- Highest home attendance: 5,500 vs SC Magdeburg (27 October 2022)
- Lowest home attendance: 800 vs Balatonfüred (31 August 2022)
| Home colours | Away colours |
- All statistics correct as of 28 September 2022.

The 2022–23 Veszprém KC season was the 45th edition in the history of Veszprém KC (known as Telekom Veszprém for sponsorship reasons) and their 42nd consecutive season in the topflight. The club is participating in Nemzeti Bajnokság I, the Magyar Kupa, the SEHA League and the EHF Champions League.

== Players ==
=== Squad information ===
Squad for the 2022–23 season.
As of 1 September 2022

Goalkeepers

- 12 (Spain) Rodrigo Corrales
- 16 (Serbia) Vladimir Cupara

Left Wingers

- 21 (Iceland) Bjarki Már Elísson
- 26 (Croatia) Manuel Štrlek

Right Wingers

- 24 (Slovenia) Gašper Marguč
- 55 (Belarus) Mikita Vailupau

Line players

- 18 (Sweden) Andreas Nilsson
- 46 (Serbia) Dragan Pechmalbec
- 88 (Hungary) Adrián Sipos

Left Backs

- 13 (Serbia) Petar Nenadić
- 23 (Hungary) Patrik Ligetvári
- 25 (Denmark) Rasmus Lauge (c)

Central Backs

- 27 (Hungary) Péter Lukács
- 35 (France) Kentin Mahé
- 39 (Egypt) Yehia El-Deraa

Right Backs

- 5 (Egypt) Yahia Omar
- 43 (Hungary) Zorán Ilic

=== Transfers ===
Source: Rajt a K&H férfi ligában

IN

- (Iceland) Bjarki Már Elísson (from (Germany) TBV Lemgo)
- (Belarus) Mikita Vailupau (from (Belarus) Meshkov Brest)
- (Serbia) Dragan Pechmalbec (from (France) Nantes)
- (Egypt) Yehia El-Deraa (from (Egypt) Zamalek)
- (Hungary) Gergő Fazekas (from (Hungary) Veszprém KKFT)

OUT

- (Hungary) Máté Lékai (to (Hungary) Ferencváros)
- (Spain) Jorge Maqueda (to (France) Nantes)
- (North Macedonia) Dejan Manaskov (to (North Macedonia) Vardar 1961)
- (Hungary) Borisz Dörnyei (to (Serbia) Dinamo Pančevo)
- (Hungary) Gergő Fazekas (loan to (Poland) Wisła Płock)
- (Hungary) Benedek Nagy (loan to (Hungary) Tatabánya)
- (Hungary) Andrej Pergel (loan to (Hungary) Tatabánya)
- (Slovenia) Blaž Blagotinšek (to (Germany) Frisch Auf Göppingen)

=== Staff members ===
Source: Staff - Telekom Veszprém 2022/2023

- Head Coach: (Serbia) (Hungary) Momir Ilić
- Assistant Coach: Péter Gulyás
- Goalkeeper Coach: Árpád Sterbik
- Fitness Coach: (Serbia) Srđan Žirojević
- Physiotherapist: (Serbia) Nemanja Vučić, (North Macedonia) Dimitar Manevski
- Club Doctor: Zsolt Mahunka MD, Tibor Sydó MD, Péter Szenkovics MD
- Masseur: József Végh
- Kinesiologist / Fitness coach: Péter Kőrösi
- Video analyst: Csaba Remport

== Club ==
=== Management ===
Source: Management

| Position | Staff member |
Veszprém Handball Team Zrt.
| CEO | Dr. Zoltán Csík |
| Sports director | László Nagy |
| Company manager | Zsolt Sevinger |
Veszprémi Építők Sport Association
| President | János Szabó |
| Co-chair | Zsolt Fazekas |
| Secretary - General | Balázs Molnár |

=== Uniform ===
- Supplier: 2Rule
- Shirt sponsor (front): Telekom / tippmix / Duna Group / City of Veszprém / Euronics
- Shirt sponsor (back): Duna Aszfalt / VEMÉVSZER / VEB 2023
- Shirt sponsor (sleeves): MKB Bank / Viavin
- Shorts sponsor: SEAT / Telekom / MKB Bank

== Pre-season ==
=== Friendly matches ===
| 5 August 2022; 17:00 | Telekom Veszprém | 35–25 | (France) Dunkerque | Veszprém Aréna, Veszprém |
| 5 August 2022; 17:00 | Elísson, Marguč 6 | (14–15) | Demouge 6 | Veszprém Aréna, Veszprém |
| 5 August 2022; 17:00 | | Report | | Veszprém Aréna, Veszprém |

| MOL Cup, Semi-final; 19 August 2022; 19:30 | Telekom Veszprém | 31–26 | (Poland) Orlen Wisła Płock | Multifunkcionális Sportcsarnok, Tatabánya; Referees: Bócz, Wiedemann |
| MOL Cup, Semi-final; 19 August 2022; 19:30 | Vailupau 6 | (15–16) | Kosorotov 4 | Multifunkcionális Sportcsarnok, Tatabánya; Referees: Bócz, Wiedemann |
| MOL Cup, Semi-final; 19 August 2022; 19:30 | | Report | | Multifunkcionális Sportcsarnok, Tatabánya; Referees: Bócz, Wiedemann |

| MOL Cup, Final; 20 August 2022; 16:45 | MOL Tatabánya KC | 29–33 | Telekom Veszprém | Multifunkcionális Sportcsarnok, Tatabánya |
| MOL Cup, Final; 20 August 2022; 16:45 | Perić 6 | (15–15) | Nenadić 6 | Multifunkcionális Sportcsarnok, Tatabánya |
| MOL Cup, Final; 20 August 2022; 16:45 | | Report | | Multifunkcionális Sportcsarnok, Tatabánya |

| HandballCity Festival, Semi-final; 27 August 2022; 19:30 | Telekom Veszprém | 35–31 | (Germany) SG Flensburg-Handewitt | Veszprém Aréna, Veszprém |
| HandballCity Festival, Semi-final; 27 August 2022; 19:30 | Omar 7 | (16–14) | Golla, Hald 5 | Veszprém Aréna, Veszprém |
| HandballCity Festival, Semi-final; 27 August 2022; 19:30 | | Report | | Veszprém Aréna, Veszprém |

| HandballCity Festival, Final; 28 August 2022; 16:30 | THW Kiel (Germany) | 27–34 | Telekom Veszprém | Veszprém Aréna, Veszprém |
| HandballCity Festival, Final; 28 August 2022; 16:30 | Dahmke 5 | (16–18) | Omar, Vailupau 6 | Veszprém Aréna, Veszprém |
| HandballCity Festival, Final; 28 August 2022; 16:30 | | Report | | Veszprém Aréna, Veszprém |

== Competitions ==
Times up to 30 October 2022 and from 26 March 2023 are CEST (UTC+2). Times from 30 October 2022 to 26 March 2023 are CET (UTC+1).

Win Draw Loss

=== Overview ===
| Competition | First match | Last match | Starting round | Final position | Record | | | | | | | |
| Competition | First match | Last match | Starting round | Final position | Pld | W | D | L | GF | GA | GD | Win % |
|---|---|---|---|---|---|---|---|---|---|---|---|---|
| Nemzeti Bajnokság I | 31 August 2022 | - | Matchday 1 | - | 13 | 13 | 0 | 0 | 526 | 383 | +143 | 100.00 |
| Magyar Kupa | - | - | Fifth round | - | 0 | 0 | 0 | 0 | 0 | 0 | +0 | — |
| EHF Champions League | 15 September 2022 | - | Group stage | - | 10 | 7 | 2 | 1 | 321 | 293 | +28 | 70.00 |
| SEHA League | - | - | Group phase | - | 0 | 0 | 0 | 0 | 0 | 0 | +0 | — |
| Total | | | | | 23 | 20 | 2 | 1 | 847 | 676 | +171 | 86.96 |

Last updated: 2 February 2023
Source: Flashscore

=== Nemzeti Bajnokság I ===
==== Regular season ====
===== Results by round =====
| Round | 1 | 2 | 3 | 4 | 5 | 6 | 7 | 8 | 9 | 10 | 11 | 12 | 13 | 14 | 15 | 16 | 17 | 18 | 19 | 20 | 21 | 22 | 23 | 24 | 25 | 26 |
|---|---|---|---|---|---|---|---|---|---|---|---|---|---|---|---|---|---|---|---|---|---|---|---|---|---|---|
| Ground | H | A | H | H | H | H | A | H | A | H | A | H | A | A | H | A | A | A | A | H | A | H | A | H | A | H |
| Result | W | W | W | W | W | W | W | W | W | W | W | W | W | | | | | | | | | | | | | |

Updated to match(es) played on 2 February 2023. Source: Matches
A = Away; H = Home; W = Win; D = Draw; L = Loss; C = Cancelled

===== Matches =====
The league fixtures were announced on 5 July 2022.

| Round 1; 31 August 2022; 17:45 | Telekom Veszprém | 35–24 | Balatonfüredi KSE | Veszprém Aréna, Veszprém; Attendance: 800; Referees: Horváth, Marton |
| Round 1; 31 August 2022; 17:45 | Vailupau 5 | (21–12) | Sretenović 4 | Veszprém Aréna, Veszprém; Attendance: 800; Referees: Horváth, Marton |
| Round 1; 31 August 2022; 17:45 | 1× (yellow card) 4× (suspension) | Report | 2× (yellow card) 4× (suspension) | Veszprém Aréna, Veszprém; Attendance: 800; Referees: Horváth, Marton |

| Round 2; 9 September 2022; 18:00 | Dabas KC | 21–30 | Telekom Veszprém | OBO Aréna, Dabas; Attendance: 700; Referees: Sándor, Szikszay |
| Round 2; 9 September 2022; 18:00 | Zdolik 5 | (11–16) | Nilsson 6 | OBO Aréna, Dabas; Attendance: 700; Referees: Sándor, Szikszay |
| Round 2; 9 September 2022; 18:00 | 2× (yellow card) 2× (suspension) | Report | 2× (yellow card) 2× (suspension) | OBO Aréna, Dabas; Attendance: 700; Referees: Sándor, Szikszay |

| Round 3; 18 November 2022; 18:00 | Telekom Veszprém | 50–40 | Ferencvárosi TC | Veszprém Aréna, Veszprém; Attendance: 2,680; Referees: Altmár, Horváth |
| Round 3; 18 November 2022; 18:00 | Nilsson 11 | (25–21) | Balogh 6 | Veszprém Aréna, Veszprém; Attendance: 2,680; Referees: Altmár, Horváth |
| Round 3; 18 November 2022; 18:00 | 1× (suspension) | Report | | Veszprém Aréna, Veszprém; Attendance: 2,680; Referees: Altmár, Horváth |

| Round 4; 25 September 2022; 18:00 | Telekom Veszprém | 42–32 | MOL Tatabánya KC | Veszprém Aréna, Veszprém; Attendance: 2,500; Referees: Bócz, Wiedemann |
| Round 4; 25 September 2022; 18:00 | Elísson 10 | (22–19) | Pedro 8 | Veszprém Aréna, Veszprém; Attendance: 2,500; Referees: Bócz, Wiedemann |
| Round 4; 25 September 2022; 18:00 | 5× (suspension) | Report | 7× (suspension) | Veszprém Aréna, Veszprém; Attendance: 2,500; Referees: Bócz, Wiedemann |

| Round 5; 1 October 2022; 18:00 | Telekom Veszprém | 39–30 | HE-DO B. Braun Gyöngyös | Veszprém Aréna, Veszprém; Attendance: 1,000; Referees: Hajdu, Halász |
| Round 5; 1 October 2022; 18:00 | Ilic 5 | (20–16) | Varsandán 7 | Veszprém Aréna, Veszprém; Attendance: 1,000; Referees: Hajdu, Halász |
| Round 5; 1 October 2022; 18:00 | 2× (yellow card) 2× (suspension) 1× (red card) | Report | 6× (suspension) | Veszprém Aréna, Veszprém; Attendance: 1,000; Referees: Hajdu, Halász |

| Round 6; 22 October 2022; 18:00 | Telekom Veszprém | 31–26 | Pick Szeged | Veszprém Aréna, Veszprém; Attendance: 5,000; Referees: Andorka, Hucker |
| Round 6; 22 October 2022; 18:00 | Vailupau 5 | (16–10) | Blonz 7 | Veszprém Aréna, Veszprém; Attendance: 5,000; Referees: Andorka, Hucker |
| Round 6; 22 October 2022; 18:00 | 1× (yellow card) 2× (suspension) 1× (red card) | Report | 1× (yellow card) 1× (suspension) 1× (red card) | Veszprém Aréna, Veszprém; Attendance: 5,000; Referees: Andorka, Hucker |

| Round 7; 29 October 2022; 18:00 | Fejér-B.Á.L. Veszprém | 27–48 | Telekom Veszprém | Városi Sportcsarnok, Veszprém; Attendance: 1,000; Referees: Kovács, Mándli |
| Round 7; 29 October 2022; 18:00 | Vetési 6 | (11–22) | Vailupau 8 | Városi Sportcsarnok, Veszprém; Attendance: 1,000; Referees: Kovács, Mándli |
| Round 7; 29 October 2022; 18:00 | 1× (yellow card) | Report | 1× (yellow card) 3× (suspension) | Városi Sportcsarnok, Veszprém; Attendance: 1,000; Referees: Kovács, Mándli |

| Round 8; 6 November 2022; 18:00 | Telekom Veszprém | 41–30 | HSA NEKA | Veszprém Aréna, Veszprém; Attendance: 1,100; Referees: Bujdosó, Horváth |
| Round 8; 6 November 2022; 18:00 | Vailupau 10 | (25–16) | Papp 5 | Veszprém Aréna, Veszprém; Attendance: 1,100; Referees: Bujdosó, Horváth |
| Round 8; 6 November 2022; 18:00 | 2× (yellow card) 1× (suspension) | Report | 1× (yellow card) 1× (suspension) | Veszprém Aréna, Veszprém; Attendance: 1,100; Referees: Bujdosó, Horváth |

| Round 9; 11 November 2022; 18:00 | Budai Farkasok KKUK | 29–39 | Telekom Veszprém | Városi Uszoda Sportcsarnok és Strand, Budaörs; Attendance: 850; Referees: Héjja, Kónya |
| Round 9; 11 November 2022; 18:00 | Enomoto 8 | (12–19) | Pechmalbec 7 | Városi Uszoda Sportcsarnok és Strand, Budaörs; Attendance: 850; Referees: Héjja, Kónya |
| Round 9; 11 November 2022; 18:00 | 1× (yellow card) 2× (suspension) | Report | 4× (yellow card) 4× (suspension) | Városi Uszoda Sportcsarnok és Strand, Budaörs; Attendance: 850; Referees: Héjja, Kónya |

| Round 10; 26 November 2022; 18:00 | Telekom Veszprém | 44–28 | Csurgói KK | Veszprém Aréna, Veszprém; Attendance: 1,100; Referees: Sándor, Szikszay |
| Round 10; 26 November 2022; 18:00 | Marguč 6 | (22–15) | Krečič 7 | Veszprém Aréna, Veszprém; Attendance: 1,100; Referees: Sándor, Szikszay |
| Round 10; 26 November 2022; 18:00 | 1× (yellow card) 0× (suspension) | Report | 2× (yellow card) 6× (suspension) | Veszprém Aréna, Veszprém; Attendance: 1,100; Referees: Sándor, Szikszay |

===== Results overview =====
| Opposition | Home score | Away score | Double |
|---|---|---|---|
| Balatonfüredi KSE | 35–24 | 11 Feb | - |
| Budai Farkasok-Rév Group | 22 Apr | 11 Nov | - |
| CYEB-Budakalász | 10 Dec | 20 May | - |
| HÉP-Cegléd | 27 May | 17 Dec | - |
| Csurgói KK | 26 Nov | 6 May | - |
| Dabas KK | 18 Feb | 21–30 | - |
| Ferencvárosi TC | 18 Nov | 25 Feb | - |
| HE-DO B. Braun Gyöngyös | 39–30 | 18 Mac | - |
| Sport36-Komló | 13 May | 3 Dec | - |
| HSA-NEKA | 6 Nov | 25 Mar | - |
| Pick Szeged | 22 Oct | 15 Apr | - |
| MOL Tatabánya KC | 42–32 | 5 Mar | - |
| Fejér-B.Á.L. Veszprém | 1 Apr | 29 Oct | - |

=== Magyar Kupa ===
Veszprém entered the tournament in the fifth round.

=== EHF Champions League ===
==== Group stage ====
The draw was held on 1 July 2022 in Vienna, Austria.

| Pos | Team | Pld | W | D | L | GF | GA | GD | Pts | Qualification | PAR | MAG | VES | GOG | BUC | PLO | ZAG | POR |
|---|---|---|---|---|---|---|---|---|---|---|---|---|---|---|---|---|---|---|
| 1 | (France) Paris Saint-Germain | 14 | 12 | 0 | 2 | 492 | 439 | +53 | 24 | Quarterfinals | — | 33–37 | 37–35 | 41–36 | 33–26 | 37–33 | 40–31 | 32–30 |
| 2 | (Germany) SC Magdeburg | 14 | 9 | 2 | 3 | 453 | 419 | +34 | 20 | Quarterfinals | 22–29 | — | 32–25 | 36–34 | 34–33 | 33–27 | 35–25 | 41–36 |
| 3 | (Hungary) Telekom Veszprém | 14 | 8 | 2 | 4 | 449 | 429 | +20 | 18 | Playoffs | 36–35 | 35–35 | — | 36–37 | 33–30 | 32–22 | 32–28 | 32–30 |
| 4 | (Denmark) GOG Håndbold | 14 | 7 | 1 | 6 | 459 | 454 | +5 | 15 | Playoffs | 30–35 | 33–32 | 30–31 | — | 38–38 | 31–24 | 33–29 | 34–33 |
| 5 | (Romania) Dinamo București | 14 | 5 | 3 | 6 | 416 | 429 | −13 | 13 | Playoffs | 29–36 | 28–30 | 31–31 | 30–27 | — | 32–27 | 27–27 | 32–27 |
| 6 | (Poland) Orlen Wisła Płock | 14 | 4 | 1 | 9 | 374 | 412 | −38 | 9 | Playoffs | 26–32 | 25–24 | 26–30 | 31–27 | 26–28 | — | 26–30 | 27–23 |
| 7 | (Croatia) PPD Zagreb | 14 | 3 | 2 | 9 | 390 | 420 | −30 | 8 | | 30–33 | 25–31 | 29–26 | 27–31 | 28–29 | 26–26 | — | 29–23 |
| 8 | (Portugal) FC Porto | 14 | 2 | 1 | 11 | 407 | 438 | −31 | 5 | | 33–35 | 31–31 | 28–35 | 26–33 | 32–23 | 27–28 | 28–26 | — |

Source: EHF
Rules for classification: Tiebreakers

| 15 September 2022; 18:45 | Telekom Veszprém | 36–34 | (France) Paris Saint-Germain | Veszprém Aréna, Veszprém; Attendance: 5,140; Referees: Marín, García (ESP) |
| 15 September 2022; 18:45 | Lauge 11 | (17–17) | Krištopāns 7 | Veszprém Aréna, Veszprém; Attendance: 5,140; Referees: Marín, García (ESP) |
| 15 September 2022; 18:45 | 1× (yellow card) 5× (suspension) | Report | 1× (yellow card) 2× (suspension) | Veszprém Aréna, Veszprém; Attendance: 5,140; Referees: Marín, García (ESP) |

| 21 September 2022; 20:45 | FC Porto (Portugal) | 28–35 | Telekom Veszprém | Dragão Arena, Porto; Attendance: 1,100; Referees: C. Bonaventura, J. Bonaventura (FRA) |
| 21 September 2022; 20:45 | Thurin 6 | (12–16) | Nenadić 7 | Dragão Arena, Porto; Attendance: 1,100; Referees: C. Bonaventura, J. Bonaventura (FRA) |
| 21 September 2022; 20:45 | 1× (yellow card) 3× (suspension) 1× (red card) | Report | 2× (suspension) | Dragão Arena, Porto; Attendance: 1,100; Referees: C. Bonaventura, J. Bonaventura (FRA) |

| 28 September 2022; 18:45 | Telekom Veszprém | 33–30 | (Romania) Dinamo București | Veszprém Aréna, Veszprém; Attendance: 4,100; Referees: Brunner, Salah (SUI) |
| 28 September 2022; 18:45 | three players 5 | (15–17) | Akimenko, Kašpárek 7 | Veszprém Aréna, Veszprém; Attendance: 4,100; Referees: Brunner, Salah (SUI) |
| 28 September 2022; 18:45 | 1× (yellow card) 3× (suspension) | Report | 2× (yellow card) 4× (suspension) | Veszprém Aréna, Veszprém; Attendance: 4,100; Referees: Brunner, Salah (SUI) |

| 5 October 2022; 20:45 | GOG Håndbold (Denmark) | 30–31 | Telekom Veszprém | Arena Fyn, Odense; Attendance: 3,120; Referees: Mažeika, Gatelis (LTU) |
| 5 October 2022; 20:45 | Olsen 7 | (14–16) | Mahé 8 | Arena Fyn, Odense; Attendance: 3,120; Referees: Mažeika, Gatelis (LTU) |
| 5 October 2022; 20:45 | 2× (yellow card) 2× (suspension) | Report | 2× (yellow card) 4× (suspension) 1× (red card) | Arena Fyn, Odense; Attendance: 3,120; Referees: Mažeika, Gatelis (LTU) |

| 27 October 2022; 18:45 | Telekom Veszprém | 35–35 | (Germany) SC Magdeburg | Veszprém Aréna, Veszprém; Attendance: 5,500; Referees: Pavićević, Ražnatović (MNE) |
| 27 October 2022; 18:45 | Lauge 8 | (16–16) | Magnússon 8 | Veszprém Aréna, Veszprém; Attendance: 5,500; Referees: Pavićević, Ražnatović (MNE) |
| 27 October 2022; 18:45 | 8× (suspension) 1× (red card) | Report | 1× (suspension) | Veszprém Aréna, Veszprém; Attendance: 5,500; Referees: Pavićević, Ražnatović (MNE) |

| 3 November 2022; 18:45 | Orlen Wisła Płock (Poland) | 26–30 | Telekom Veszprém | Orlen Arena, Płock; Attendance: 4,000; Referees: Lah, Sok (SLO) |
| 3 November 2022; 18:45 | Pérez Arce 5 | (14–15) | Lauge 11 | Orlen Arena, Płock; Attendance: 4,000; Referees: Lah, Sok (SLO) |
| 3 November 2022; 18:45 | 1× (yellow card) 2× (suspension) | Report | 6× (suspension) 1× (red card) | Orlen Arena, Płock; Attendance: 4,000; Referees: Lah, Sok (SLO) |

| 24 November 2022; 18:45 | Telekom Veszprém | 32–28 | (Croatia) RK Zagreb | Veszprém Aréna, Veszprém; Attendance: 4,625; Referees: Erdoğan, Özdeniz (TUR) |
| 24 November 2022; 18:45 | Nenadić 6 | (16–15) | Musa 6 | Veszprém Aréna, Veszprém; Attendance: 4,625; Referees: Erdoğan, Özdeniz (TUR) |
| 24 November 2022; 18:45 | 1× (yellow card) 2× (suspension) 1× (red card) | Report | 3× (yellow card) 5× (suspension) 1× (red card) | Veszprém Aréna, Veszprém; Attendance: 4,625; Referees: Erdoğan, Özdeniz (TUR) |

| 30 November 2022; 20:45 | RK Zagreb (Croatia) | 29–26 | Telekom Veszprém | Arena Zagreb, Zagreb; Attendance: 1,300; Referees: Madsen, Mortensen (DEN) |
| 30 November 2022; 20:45 | Sirotić 6 | (12–14) | Nilsson, Omar 7 | Arena Zagreb, Zagreb; Attendance: 1,300; Referees: Madsen, Mortensen (DEN) |
| 30 November 2022; 20:45 | 2× (yellow card) 5× (suspension) | Report | 2× (yellow card) 5× (suspension) 1× (red card) | Arena Zagreb, Zagreb; Attendance: 1,300; Referees: Madsen, Mortensen (DEN) |

| 8 December 2022; 18:45 | Telekom Veszprém | 32–22 | (Poland) Orlen Wisła Płock | Veszprém Aréna, Veszprém; Attendance: 5,019; Referees: Jørum, Kleven (NOR) |
| 8 December 2022; 18:45 | Nenadić 9 | (17–9) | Kosorotov 7 | Veszprém Aréna, Veszprém; Attendance: 5,019; Referees: Jørum, Kleven (NOR) |
| 8 December 2022; 18:45 | 4× (suspension) | Report | 1× (yellow card) 9× (suspension) 1× (red card) | Veszprém Aréna, Veszprém; Attendance: 5,019; Referees: Jørum, Kleven (NOR) |

| 15 December 2022; 18:45 | Dinamo București (Romania) | 31–31 | Telekom Veszprém | Polyvalent Hall, Bucharest; Attendance: 3,700; Referees: Marín, García (ESP) |
| 15 December 2022; 18:45 | Akimenko 7 | (13–16) | Nenadić, Vailupau 7 | Polyvalent Hall, Bucharest; Attendance: 3,700; Referees: Marín, García (ESP) |
| 15 December 2022; 18:45 | 1× (yellow card) 1× (suspension) | Report | 2× (yellow card) 3× (suspension) | Polyvalent Hall, Bucharest; Attendance: 3,700; Referees: Marín, García (ESP) |

| 8 February 2023; 18:45 | Telekom Veszprém | v | (Denmark) GOG Håndbold | Veszprém Aréna, Veszprém; Referees: Martins, Martins (POR) |
| 8 February 2023; 18:45 | | Report | | Veszprém Aréna, Veszprém; Referees: Martins, Martins (POR) |

| 16 February 2023; 20:45 | SC Magdeburg (Germany) | v | Telekom Veszprém | GETEC Arena, Magdeburg |
| 16 February 2023; 20:45 | | Report | | GETEC Arena, Magdeburg |

| 23 February 2023; 18:45 | Telekom Veszprém | v | (Portugal) FC Porto | Veszprém Aréna, Veszprém |
| 23 February 2023; 18:45 | | Report | | Veszprém Aréna, Veszprém |

| 1 March 2023; 20:45 | Paris Saint-Germain (France) | v | Telekom Veszprém | Stade Pierre de Coubertin, Paris |
| 1 March 2023; 20:45 | | Report | | Stade Pierre de Coubertin, Paris |

===== Results overview =====
| Opposition | Home score | Away score | Double |
|---|---|---|---|
| (France) Paris Saint-Germain | 36–34 | 1 Mar | - |
| (Germany) SC Magdeburg | 35–35 | 15 Feb | - |
| (Denmark) GOG Håndbold | 8 Feb | 30–31 | - |
| (Portugal) FC Porto | 15 Feb | 28–35 | - |
| (Romania) Dinamo București | 33–30 | 31–31 | 64-61 |
| (Poland) Orlen Wisła Płock | 32–22 | 26–30 | 62-48 |
| (Croatia) RK Zagreb | 32–28 | 29–26 | 58-57 |

== Statistics ==
=== Top scorers ===
Includes all competitive matches. The list is sorted by shirt number when total goals are equal. Last updated on 2 February 2023.

| Position | Nation | No. | Name | Hungarian League | Hungarian Cup | SEHA League | Champions League | Total |
|---|---|---|---|---|---|---|---|---|
| 1 | (Sweden) | 18 | Andreas Nilsson | 58 | 0 | 0 | 32 | 90 |
| 2 | (Belarus) | 55 | Mikita Vailupau | 60 | 0 | 0 | 20 | 80 |
| 3 | (Egypt) | 5 | Yahia Omar | 42 | 0 | 0 | 37 | 79 |
| 4 | (Serbia) | 13 | Petar Nenadić | 24 | 0 | 0 | 49 | 73 |
| 5 | (Serbia) | 46 | Dragan Pechmalbec | 52 | 0 | 0 | 21 | 73 |
| 6 | (Iceland) | 21 | Bjarki Már Elísson | 54 | 0 | 0 | 16 | 70 |
| 7 | (Denmark) | 25 | Rasmus Lauge | 18 | 0 | 0 | 46 | 64 |
| 8 | (Egypt) | 39 | Yehia El-Deraa | 40 | 0 | 0 | 20 | 60 |
| 9 | (Croatia) | 26 | Manuel Štrlek | 31 | 0 | 0 | 25 | 56 |
| 10 | (Slovenia) | 24 | Gašper Marguč | 37 | 0 | 0 | 17 | 54 |
| 11 | (France) | 35 | Kentin Mahé | 21 | 0 | 0 | 25 | 46 |
| 12 | (Hungary) | 43 | Zoran Ilic | 30 | 0 | 0 | 7 | 37 |
| 13 | (Hungary) | 27 | Péter Lukács | 26 | 0 | 0 | 0 | 26 |
| 14 | (Hungary) | 88 | Adrián Sipos | 11 | 0 | 0 | 6 | 17 |
| 15 | (Hungary) | 23 | Patrik Ligetvári | 16 | 0 | 0 | 0 | 16 |
| 16 | (Serbia) | 16 | Vladimir Cupara | 4 | 0 | 0 | 0 | 4 |
| 17 | (Spain) | 12 | Rodrigo Corrales | 1 | 0 | 0 | 0 | 1 |
| 18 | (Slovenia) | 31 | Blaž Blagotinšek | 1 | 0 | 0 | 0 | 1 |
| | | | TOTALS | 526 | 0 | 0 | 321 | 847 |

=== Attendances ===
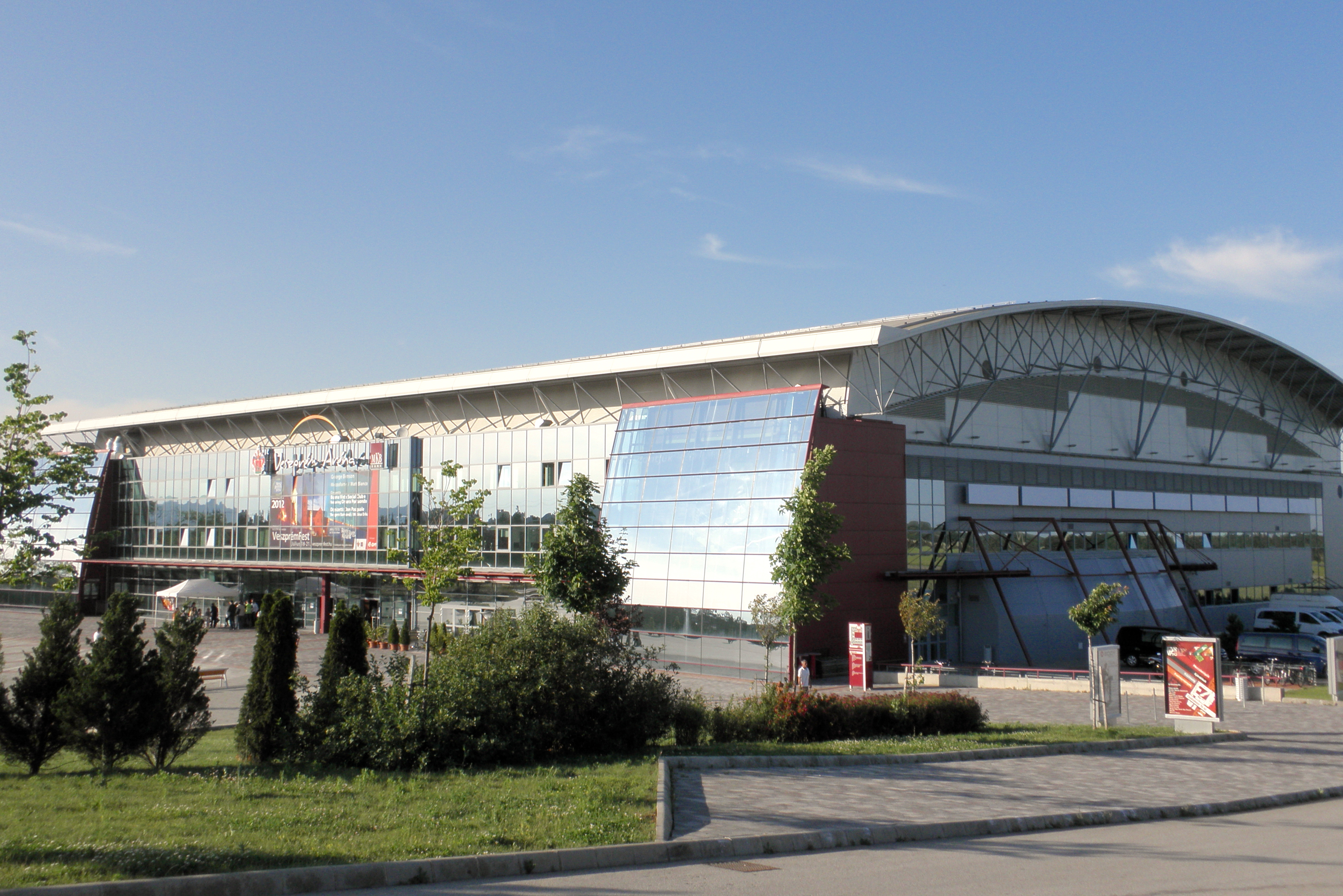
Home hall: Veszprém Aréna

List of the home matches:

| Round | Against | Attadance | Capatility | Date |
|---|---|---|---|---|
| NB I – 1. | Balatonfüredi KSE | 800 | 15.4% | August 31, 2022 |
| CL – (GS) 1. | (France) Paris Saint-Germain | 5,140 | 102.4% | September 15, 2022 |
| NB I – 4. | MOL Tatabánya KC | 2,500 | 48.4% | September 25, 2022 |
| CL – (GS) 3. | (Romania) Dinamo București | 4,100 | 81.7% | September 28, 2022 |
| NB I – 5. | HE-DO B. Braun Gyöngyös | 1,000 | 19.3% | October 1, 2022 |
| NB I – 6. | Pick Szeged | 5,000 | 96.7% | October 22, 2022 |
| CL – (GS) 5. | (Germany) SC Magdeburg | 5,500 | 110.0% | October 27, 2022 |
| NB I – 8. | HSA NEKA | 1,100 | 21.3% | November 6, 2022 |
| NB I – 3. | Ferencvárosi TC | 2,680 | 51.8% | November 18, 2022 |
| CL – (GS) 7. | (Croatia) RK Zagreb | 4,625 | 92.1% | November 24, 2022 |
| NB I – 10. | Csurgói KK | 1,100 | 21.3% | November 26, 2022 |
| CL – (GS) 9. | (Poland) Wisla Plock | 5,019 | 100% | December 8, 2022 |
| NB I – 12. | CYEB-Budakalász | 1,100 | 21.3% | December 10, 2022 |
| NB I – 13. | HÉP Cegléd | 1,000 | 19.3% | December 17, 2022 |
| CL – (GS) 11. | (Denmark) GOG Håndbold | | | February 8, 2023 |
| NB I – 15. | Dabas KC | | | February 11, 2023 |
