= Krešimir Ćosić Hall =

Sports arena in Zadar, Croatia

- Dvorana Krešimira Ćosića
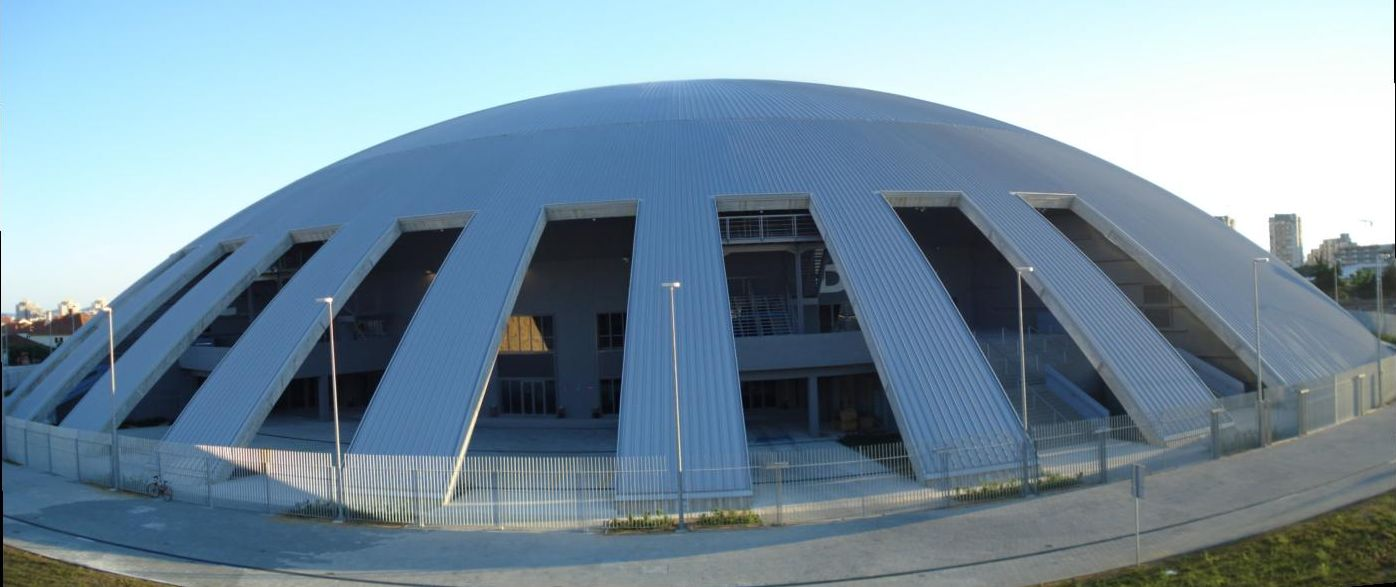
- Interactive map of Krešimir Ćosić Hall
- Location: Višnjik, Zadar, Croatia
- Coordinates: 44°7′10.20″N 15°14′44.12″E
- Owner: City of Zadar
- Capacity: 8,500
- Surface: Hardwood

Construction
- Groundbreaking: 2004
- Opened: May 2008; 18 years ago
- Architect: Marijan Hržić
- Main contractors: Lavčević inženjering d.o.o. Hering Ploče d.o.o.

Tenants
- KK Zadar (2008–present): Major events hosted; 2009 World Men's Handball Championship; 2020 SEHA League Final Four; 2021 SEHA League Final Four; 2023 SEHA League Final Four

Website
- visnjik.hr

The Krešimir Ćosić Hall (Croatian: Dvorana Krešimira Ćosića) is a multi-purpose indoor arena located in Zadar, Croatia. The arena is home to the KK Zadar basketball club, and also hosts concerts, conventions, and other sporting, business and entertainment events.

== Naming ==
From October 2008, its official name became Krešimir Ćosić Hall, named after the Croatian basketball player Krešimir Ćosić. Former name of the arena was Sportski centar Višnjik (English: Višnjik Sports Center). The arena's nickname is "Peka", coming from peka, a traditional Dalmatian cookware. For several months during 2008, it was the largest indoor arena in Croatia, and now it is the third largest.

== Events ==
The arena was used as one of the venues during the 2009 World Men's Handball Championship. Also, the Croatia Davis Cup team has played at the arena for the 2008 Davis Cup World Group play-offs and 2016 Davis Cup World Group semifinals.The arena was also host for group matches during 2021 Women's European Volleyball Championship.

== Gallery ==
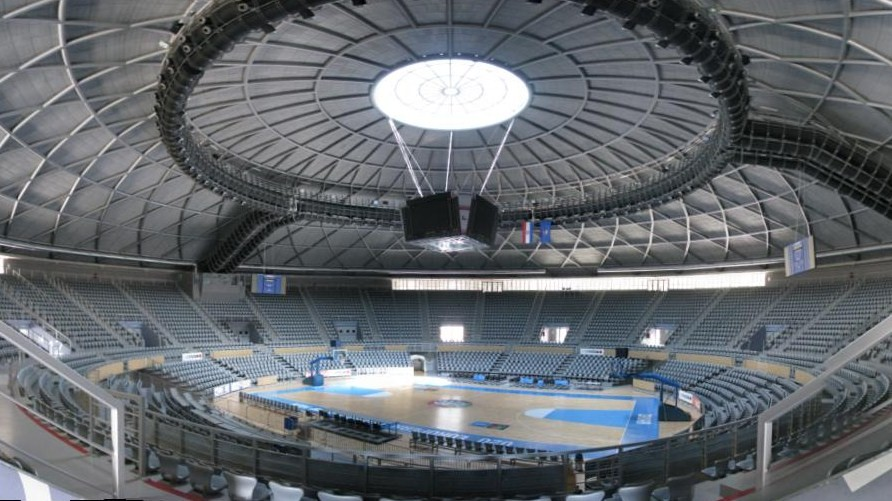
Interior

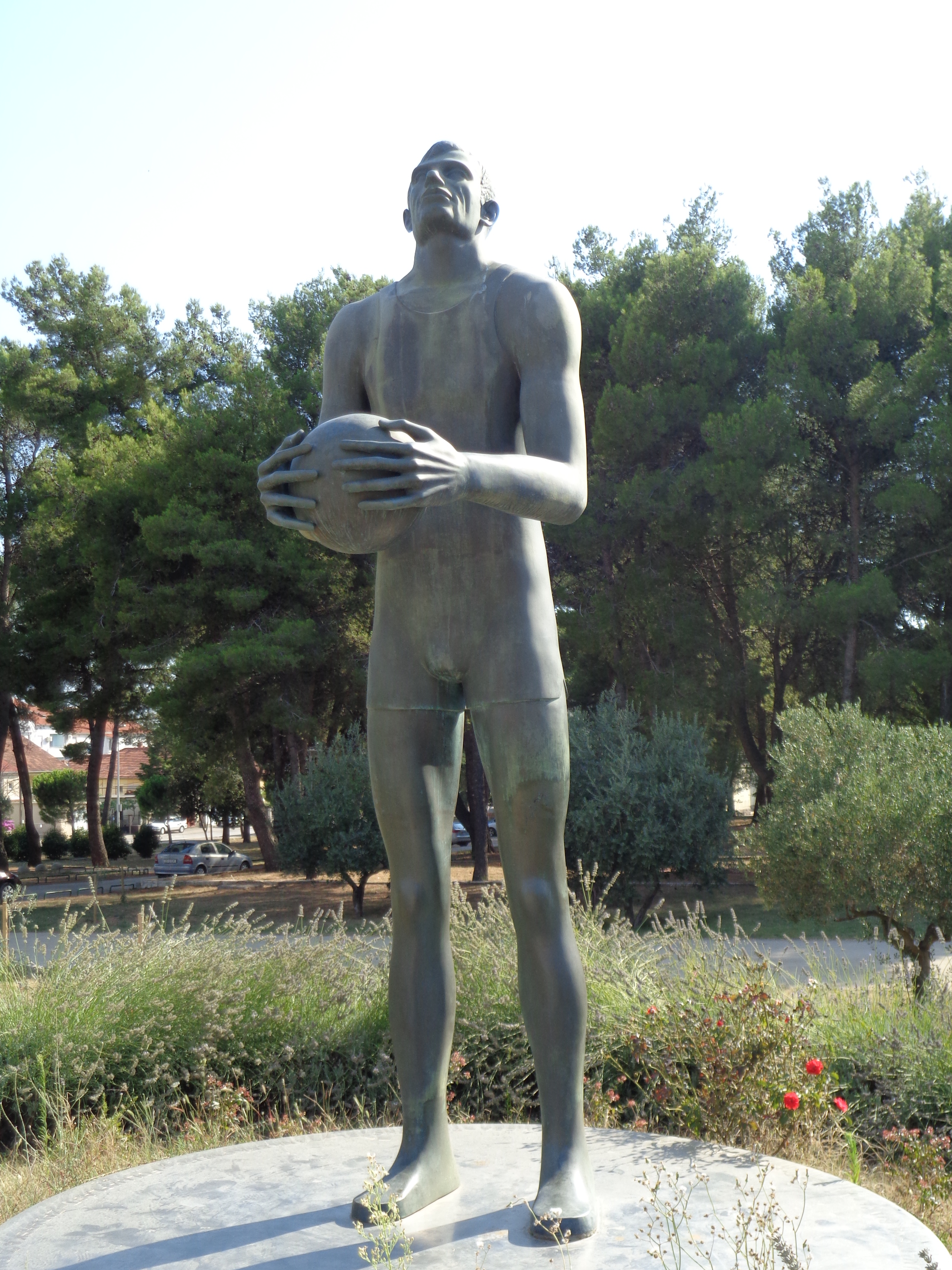
Statue of Krešimir Ćosić in front of the hall

== See also ==
- List of indoor arenas in Croatia
- List of indoor arenas in Europe
