= 2019–20 SEHA League =

2019–20 SEHA League season
- League: SEHA League
- Sport: Handball
- Duration: 3 September 2019–6 September 2020
- Games: 80
- Teams: 12; Belarus (1 team); China (1 team); Croatia (2 teams); Hungary (1 team); North Macedonia (2 teams); Russia (1 team); Serbia (2 teams); Ukraine (1 team); Slovakia (1 team)

Regular season
- Top scorer: (Belarus) Mikita Vailupau (111 goals)

Final Four
- Finals champions: (Hungary) Telekom Veszprém
- Runners-up: (North Macedonia) Vardar 1961
- Finals MVP: (Spain) Rodrigo Corrales

SEHA League seasons
- ← 2018–19 2020–21 →

The 2019–20 SEHA League season was the ninth season of the SEHA (South East Handball Association) League and sixth under the sponsorship of the Russian oil and gas company Gazprom. Twelve teams from nine countries (Belarus, Croatia, North Macedonia, Serbia, Slovakia, Hungary, Ukraine, Russia and China were participating in this year's competition. On 13 August the Executive Committee of the SEHA – Gazprom League has made a decision that because of the crucial disagreements over conditions regarding the participation in the 2019/20 season, Tatabánya will not participate in the SEHA – Gazprom League this season.

Vardar 1961 were defending champions.

Final four tournament was held at Krešimir Ćosić Hall in Zadar, Croatia, on 4 and September 2020. Telekom Veszprém defeated Vardar 1961 30–29 in the final to win their third title.

== Competition format ==
Twelve teams, divided into two groups participated in the competition. Groups A and B were played with six teams each, in a round robin, home and away format. The top two teams in each group qualified directly for the quarter-finals, while the teams that finish the Group Phase in positions 3–6 played in the Play off phase.

Play off Phase

8 teams played home and away in the Play off phase, with the teams that finish the Group Phase in positions 3–6.

Quarter-finals

The four winners of the matches in the Play off phase, joined by the top two of Groups A and B, played home and away for the right to contest the SEHA Final 4.

SEHA Final 4

The culmination of the season, the SEHA Final 4, continues in its existing format, with the four top teams from the competition competing for the title over one weekend. The host and schedule for this year's Final Four tournament was announced on 25 February 2020.

== Team information ==
The SEHA – Gazprom League Executive Committee made decision that 12 participants will play in two groups in the upcoming season. Telekom Veszprem, Motor Zaporizhzhia, Eurofarm Pelister, Metaloplastika Sabac, HC Spartak Moscow and Beijing Sport University are the new clubs that will join the 9th SEHA – Gazprom League season.

=== Venues and locations ===
Country	Team	City	Venue (Capacity)
Belarus	Meshkov Brest	Brest	Universal Sports Complex Victoria (3,740)
China	Beijing Sport University	Beijing^{1}	Dom sportova 2, Zagreb (3,100)
Croatia	PPD Zagreb	Zagreb	Dom sportova 2 (3,100)
Croatia	Nexe	Našice	Sportska dvorana kralja Tomislava (2,500)
Hungary	Telekom Veszprém	Veszprém	Veszprém Aréna (5,096)
(North Macedonia) Macedonia	Vardar 1961	Skopje	Jane Sandanski Arena (6,500)
(North Macedonia) Macedonia	Eurofarm Pelister	Bitola	Sports Hall Boro Čurlevski (3,700)
Serbia	Metaloplastika	Šabac	Zorka Hall (3,000)
Serbia	Vojvodina	Novi Sad	Sportski centar Slana Bara (2,000)
Russia	Spartak Moscow	Moscow	Dynamo Sports Palace (5,000)
Ukraine	Motor Zaporizhzhia	Zaporizhzhia	Yunost Sport Hall (3,600)
Slovakia	Tatran Prešov	Prešov	Tatran Handball Arena (4,870)

Notes

^{1} Beijing Sport University will play all of their home matches in Zagreb, Croatia.

Location of teams in 2019–20 SEHA League (Croatia, North Macedonia, and Serbia)
Location of teams in 2019–20 SEHA League (Hungary)
Location of teams in 2019–20 SEHA League (Belarus)
Location of teams in 2019–20 SEHA League (Slovakia)
Location of teams in 2019–20 SEHA League (Ukraine)
Location of teams in 2019–20 SEHA League (China)

Location of teams in 2019–20 SEHA League (Russia)

=== Personnel and kits ===
Following is the list of clubs competing in 2019–20 SEHA League, with their manager, team captain, kit manufacturer and shirt sponsor.

Team	Head coach	Team captain	Kit manufacturer
Meshkov Brest	(Spain) Raúl Alonso	(Croatia) Ivan Pesic	Joma
PPD Zagreb	(Montenegro) Veselin Vujović	(Croatia) Zlatko Horvat	Hummel
Nexe	(Croatia) Hrvoje Horvat	(Croatia) Vedran Zrnić	Jako
Vardar 1961	(North Macedonia) Stevče Aluševski	(North Macedonia) Stojanče Stoilov	Hummel
Eurofarm Pelister	(Croatia) Željko Babić	(North Macedonia) Goce Ojleski	Unit Sport
Telekom Veszprém	(Spain) David Davis	(Hungary) Máté Lékai	2Rule
Vojvodina	(Serbia) Boris Rojević	(Serbia) Vukašin Stojanović	NAAI
Tatran Prešov	(Croatia) Slavko Goluža	(Slovakia) Radovan Pekár	ATAK Sportswear
Metaloplastika	(Serbia) Veselin Vuković	(Serbia) Borivoje Đukić	Unit Sport
Motor Zaporizhzhia	(Ukraine) Rostislav Lanevich	(Ukraine) Zakhar Denysov	Hummel
Spartak Moscow	(Russia) Igor Lyovshin	(Russia) Dimitry Kovalev	Puma
Beijing Sport University	(Croatia) Vlado Šola	(China) Wang Wei	Hummel

=== Coaching changes ===
Round	Club	Outgoing coach	Date of change	Incoming coach
3rd	PPD Zagreb	(Slovenia) Branko Tamše	24 September 2019	(Montenegro) Veselin Vujović
5th	Vardar 1961	(Spain) David Pisonero	17 October 2019	(Russia) Eduard Koksharov
7th	Motor Zaporizhzhia	(Ukraine) Mykola Stepanets	12 November 2019	(Ukraine) Rostislav Lanevich
7th	Eurofarm Pelister	(North Macedonia) Stevče Aluševski	24 November 2019	(North Macedonia) Božidar Mojsov
10th	Vardar 1961	(Russia) Eduard Koksharov	28 December 2019	(North Macedonia) Stevče Aluševski
10th	Eurofarm Pelister	(North Macedonia) Božidar Mojsov	8 January 2020	(Croatia) Željko Babić

== Group phase ==
In the Group Phase, each team played ten matches within their respective groups. Five matches were played at home, and five matches away. The final position after the ten rounds determined if a club will play in the Play off phase or if they will earn a direct placement to the quarterfinals phase.

=== Group A ===
Pos	Team	Pld	W	D	L	GF	GA	GD	Pts	Qualification	VAR	ZAP	PRE	VOJ	NEX	BEJ
1	(North Macedonia) Vardar 1961	10	8	0	2	319	291	+28	24 (Note: Vardar 1961 75–69 Motor Zaporizhzhia)	Quarter finals	—	44–37	28–26	26–23	27–25	37–23
2	(Ukraine) Motor Zaporizhzhia	10	8	0	2	314	274	+40	24	Quarter finals	32–31	—	29–23	37–29	33–31	41–19
3	(Slovakia) Tatran Prešov	10	5	0	5	262	242	+20	15 (Note: Tatran Prešov 44–41 Vojvodina)	Playoffs	22–29	24–25	—	22–18	24–22	38–25
4	(Serbia) Vojvodina	10	5	0	5	269	265	+4	15	Playoffs	33–35	25–22	23–22	—	29–23	38–25
5	(Croatia) Nexe	10	4	0	6	299	268	+31	12	Playoffs	42–26	25–28	24–25	32–24	—	40–26
6	(China) Beijing Sport University	10	0	0	10	235	358	−123	0	Playoffs	28–36	23–30	19–36	21–28	26–35	—

Source: SEHA

=== Group B ===
Pos	Team	Pld	W	D	L	GF	GA	GD	Pts	Qualification	VES	ZAG	MES	PEL	MET	SPA
1	(Hungary) Telekom Veszprém	10	8	0	2	306	265	+41	24	Quarter finals	—	36–28	32–23	35–24	36–29	37–32
2	(Croatia) PPD Zagreb	10	7	0	3	289	259	+30	21	Quarter finals	23–26	—	30–24	24–23	30–25	30–17
3	(Belarus) Meshkov Brest	10	6	0	4	307	279	+28	18	Playoffs	27–28	33–29	—	31–22	32–21	35–24
4	(North Macedonia) Eurofarm Pelister	10	4	0	6	279	275	+4	12 (Note: Eurofarm Pelister 58–48 Metaloplastika)	Playoffs	26–24	27–28	32–35	—	32–21	34–29
5	(Serbia) Metaloplastika	10	4	0	6	272	302	−30	12	Playoffs	30–26	25–28	35–33	27–26	—	27–23
6	(Russia) Spartak Moscow	10	1	0	9	254	327	−73	3	Playoffs	23–26	23–39	26–34	21–33	36–32	—

Source: SEHA

== Playoffs ==
The Play off phase was made up of two matches for each participating team, one match played at home and one match played away. The teams that finished the Group Phase in positions 3–6 played in the Play off phase.

=== Overview ===
Team 1	Agg.	Team 2	1st leg	2nd leg
Spartak Moscow (Russia)	45–63	(Slovakia) Tatran Prešov	23–31	22–32
Metaloplastika (Serbia)	48–51	(Serbia) Vojvodina	24–25	24–26
Nexe (Croatia)	45–44	(North Macedonia) Eurofarm Pelister	23–20	22–24
Beijing Sport University (China)	49–87 ^{1}	(Belarus) Meshkov Brest	26–46	23–41

Notes

^{1} Both legs were hosted by Meshkov Brest.

==== Matches ====
2 February 2020; 17:00 CEST (UTC+02:00)	Spartak Moscow (Russia)	23–31	(Slovakia) Tatran Prešov	Dynamo Sports Palace, Moscow; Attendance: 250; Referees: Nabokau, Kulik (BLR)
2 February 2020; 17:00 CEST (UTC+02:00)	Vinogradov 6	(13–15)	Rábek 9	Dynamo Sports Palace, Moscow; Attendance: 250; Referees: Nabokau, Kulik (BLR)
2 February 2020; 17:00 CEST (UTC+02:00)	2× (yellow card) 6× (suspension)	Report	1× (yellow card) 4× (suspension)	Dynamo Sports Palace, Moscow; Attendance: 250; Referees: Nabokau, Kulik (BLR)

8 February 2020; 18:00 CEST (UTC+02:00)	Tatran Prešov (Slovakia)	32–22	(Russia) Spartak Moscow	Tatran Handball Arena, Prešov; Attendance: 2,475; Referees: Boričič, Marković (SRB)
8 February 2020; 18:00 CEST (UTC+02:00)	Rábek 9	(16–11)	Voiniush 5	Tatran Handball Arena, Prešov; Attendance: 2,475; Referees: Boričič, Marković (SRB)
8 February 2020; 18:00 CEST (UTC+02:00)	1× (yellow card) 6× (suspension)	Report	2× (yellow card) 4× (suspension)	Tatran Handball Arena, Prešov; Attendance: 2,475; Referees: Boričič, Marković (SRB)

Tatran Prešov won 63–45 on aggregate.

2 February 2020; 19:00 CEST (UTC+02:00)	Metaloplastika (Serbia)	24–25	(Serbia) Vojvodina	Zorka Hall, Šabac; Attendance: 1,500; Referees: Gubica, Milošević (CRO)
2 February 2020; 19:00 CEST (UTC+02:00)	Milić 8	(14–12)	Nikolić 7	Zorka Hall, Šabac; Attendance: 1,500; Referees: Gubica, Milošević (CRO)
2 February 2020; 19:00 CEST (UTC+02:00)	1× (yellow card) 4× (suspension) 1× (red card)	Report	2× (yellow card) 7× (suspension)	Zorka Hall, Šabac; Attendance: 1,500; Referees: Gubica, Milošević (CRO)

11 February 2020; 17:15 CEST (UTC+02:00)	Vojvodina (Serbia)	26–24	(Serbia) Metaloplastika	Sportski centar Slana Bara, Novi Sad; Attendance: 552; Referees: Nachevski, Nikolov (MKD)
11 February 2020; 17:15 CEST (UTC+02:00)	Grozdanić 5	(11–12)	Milić 5	Sportski centar Slana Bara, Novi Sad; Attendance: 552; Referees: Nachevski, Nikolov (MKD)
11 February 2020; 17:15 CEST (UTC+02:00)	2× (yellow card) 9× (suspension)	Report	2× (yellow card) 7× (suspension)	Sportski centar Slana Bara, Novi Sad; Attendance: 552; Referees: Nachevski, Nikolov (MKD)

Vojvodina won 51–48 on aggregate.

1 February 2020; 15:00 CEST (UTC+02:00)	Nexe (Croatia)	23–20	(North Macedonia) Eurofarm Pelister	Sportska dvorana kralja Tomislava, Našice; Attendance: 2,150; Referees: Horváth, Márton (HUN)
1 February 2020; 15:00 CEST (UTC+02:00)	B. Jaman, Kević 4	(10–9)	Ostroushko 7	Sportska dvorana kralja Tomislava, Našice; Attendance: 2,150; Referees: Horváth, Márton (HUN)
1 February 2020; 15:00 CEST (UTC+02:00)	2× (yellow card) 3× (suspension)	Report	2× (yellow card) 1× (suspension)	Sportska dvorana kralja Tomislava, Našice; Attendance: 2,150; Referees: Horváth, Márton (HUN)

12 February 2020; 20:15 CEST (UTC+02:00)	Eurofarm Pelister (North Macedonia)	24–22	(Croatia) Nexe	Sports Hall Boro Čurlevski, Bitola; Attendance: 3,000; Referees: Nikolić, Stojković (SRB)
12 February 2020; 20:15 CEST (UTC+02:00)	Jotić 5	(13–10)	Severec 5	Sports Hall Boro Čurlevski, Bitola; Attendance: 3,000; Referees: Nikolić, Stojković (SRB)
12 February 2020; 20:15 CEST (UTC+02:00)	2× (yellow card) 2× (suspension)	Report	3× (yellow card) 4× (suspension)	Sports Hall Boro Čurlevski, Bitola; Attendance: 3,000; Referees: Nikolić, Stojković (SRB)

Nexe won 45–44 on aggregate.

2 March 2020; 16:15 CEST (UTC+02:00)	Beijing Sport University (China)	26–46	(Belarus) Meshkov Brest	Sportshall Victoria, Brest; Attendance: 215; Referees: Antashev, Musatov (RUS)
2 March 2020; 16:15 CEST (UTC+02:00)	Qinglong 6	(14–20)	Baranau 8	Sportshall Victoria, Brest; Attendance: 215; Referees: Antashev, Musatov (RUS)
2 March 2020; 16:15 CEST (UTC+02:00)	1× (yellow card) 5× (suspension)	Report	1× (yellow card) 4× (suspension)	Sportshall Victoria, Brest; Attendance: 215; Referees: Antashev, Musatov (RUS)

3 March 2020; 16:15 CEST (UTC+02:00)	Meshkov Brest (Belarus)	41–23	(China) Beijing Sport University	Sportshall Victoria, Brest; Attendance: 165; Referees: Antashev, Musatov (RUS)
3 March 2020; 16:15 CEST (UTC+02:00)	Baranau 9	(20–11)	Juncheng 5	Sportshall Victoria, Brest; Attendance: 165; Referees: Antashev, Musatov (RUS)
3 March 2020; 16:15 CEST (UTC+02:00)	2× (yellow card) 1× (suspension)	Report	2× (yellow card) 4× (suspension)	Sportshall Victoria, Brest; Attendance: 165; Referees: Antashev, Musatov (RUS)

Meshkov Brest won 87–49 on aggregate.

== Quarter-finals ==
There will be eight teams competing in the quarter-finals phase. Four teams will have earned a direct placement after the Group Phase, and four additional teams will have earned a quarter-finals spot through the playoff phase.

The SEHA – Gazprom League’s commissioner on Friday 13 March 2020 has made a decision to postpone SEHA - Gazprom League Quarter final 2nd leg matches: Telekom Veszprem – Vojvodina (14 March 2020) and Vardar 1961 - Nexe (15 March 2020), due to the ongoing developments in the spread of COVID-19 across Europe. All further updates will be published accordingly.

=== Overview ===
Team 1	Agg.	Team 2	1st leg	2nd leg
Nexe (Croatia)	56–56	(North Macedonia) Vardar 1961	30–31	26-25
Vojvodina (Serbia)	26–41	(Hungary) Telekom Veszprém	26–31	0–10
Meshkov Brest (Belarus)	63–56	(Ukraine) Motor Zaporizhzhia	30–28	33–28
Tatran Prešov (Slovakia)	37–53	(Croatia) PPD Zagreb	21–25	16–28

==== Matches ====
8 March 2020; 17:00 CEST (UTC+02:00)	Nexe (Croatia)	30–31	(North Macedonia) Vardar 1961	Sportska dvorana kralja Tomislava, Našice; Attendance: 2,560; Referees: Brunovský, Čanda (SVK)
8 March 2020; 17:00 CEST (UTC+02:00)	Pešić 7	(15–15)	Dibirov 12	Sportska dvorana kralja Tomislava, Našice; Attendance: 2,560; Referees: Brunovský, Čanda (SVK)
8 March 2020; 17:00 CEST (UTC+02:00)	2× (yellow card) 4× (suspension)	Report	1× (yellow card) 2× (suspension)	Sportska dvorana kralja Tomislava, Našice; Attendance: 2,560; Referees: Brunovský, Čanda (SVK)

29 August 2020; 20:15 CEST (UTC+02:00)	Vardar 1961 (North Macedonia)	25–26	(Croatia) Nexe	Jane Sandanski Arena, Skopje; Referees: Boričić, Marković (SRB)
29 August 2020; 20:15 CEST (UTC+02:00)	Dissinger, Čupić 5	(13–13)	Jaganjac 8	Jane Sandanski Arena, Skopje; Referees: Boričić, Marković (SRB)
29 August 2020; 20:15 CEST (UTC+02:00)	5× (yellow card) 2× (suspension)	Report	5× (yellow card) 2× (suspension)	Jane Sandanski Arena, Skopje; Referees: Boričić, Marković (SRB)

Vardar 1961 won 56–56 on aggregate on away goals.

8 March 2020; 13:00 CEST (UTC+02:00)	Vojvodina (Serbia)	26–31	(Hungary) Telekom Veszprém	Sportski centar Slana Bara, Novi Sad; Attendance: 1,250; Referees: Metalari, Nikolovski (MKD)
8 March 2020; 13:00 CEST (UTC+02:00)	Stojković 9	(10–15)	Štrlek 7	Sportski centar Slana Bara, Novi Sad; Attendance: 1,250; Referees: Metalari, Nikolovski (MKD)
8 March 2020; 13:00 CEST (UTC+02:00)	2× (yellow card) 5× (suspension)	Report	6× (suspension)	Sportski centar Slana Bara, Novi Sad; Attendance: 1,250; Referees: Metalari, Nikolovski (MKD)

25 August 2020	Telekom Veszprém (Hungary)	10–0 (awarded)	(Serbia) Vojvodina	Veszprém Aréna, Veszprém
25 August 2020		Report		Veszprém Aréna, Veszprém

- HC Vojvodina has informed the SEHA – Gazprom League Board that due to epidemiological and transport issues which occurred in Serbia caused by the pandemic situation, they were not able to travel to Hungary, for the 2nd leg of the SEHA Quarter finals against Telekom Veszprém. SEHA - Gazprom League’s Commissioner regarding mentioned match, decided the game to be awarded 10–0 in favor of Telekom Veszprém, according to the League’s regulations.

Telekom Veszprém won 41–26 on aggregate.

7 March 2020; 15:00 CEST (UTC+02:00)	Meshkov Brest (Belarus)	30–28	(Ukraine) Motor Zaporizhzhia	Sportshall Victoria, Brest; Attendance: 1,000; Referees: Pandžić, Mošorinski (SRB)
7 March 2020; 15:00 CEST (UTC+02:00)	Shkurinskiy 6	(16–15)	Ganchev 6	Sportshall Victoria, Brest; Attendance: 1,000; Referees: Pandžić, Mošorinski (SRB)
7 March 2020; 15:00 CEST (UTC+02:00)	3× (yellow card) 1× (suspension)	Report	2× (yellow card) 2× (suspension)	Sportshall Victoria, Brest; Attendance: 1,000; Referees: Pandžić, Mošorinski (SRB)

12 March 2020; 17:00 CEST (UTC+02:00)	Motor Zaporizhzhia (Ukraine)	28–33	(Belarus) Meshkov Brest	Yunost Sport Hall, Zaporizhzhia; Attendance: 200; Referees: Gubica, Milošević (CRO)
12 March 2020; 17:00 CEST (UTC+02:00)	Pukhouski 7	(11–15)	Vailupau 8	Yunost Sport Hall, Zaporizhzhia; Attendance: 200; Referees: Gubica, Milošević (CRO)
12 March 2020; 17:00 CEST (UTC+02:00)	3× (yellow card) 5× (suspension)	Report	3× (suspension)	Yunost Sport Hall, Zaporizhzhia; Attendance: 200; Referees: Gubica, Milošević (CRO)

Meshkov Brest won 63–56 on aggregate.

7 March 2020; 17:15 CEST (UTC+02:00)	Tatran Prešov (Slovakia)	21–25	(Croatia) PPD Zagreb	Tatran Handball Arena, Prešov; Attendance: 1,439; Referees: Nachevski, Nikolov (MKD)
7 March 2020; 17:15 CEST (UTC+02:00)	Pacheco 9	(11–11)	Mandić 6	Tatran Handball Arena, Prešov; Attendance: 1,439; Referees: Nachevski, Nikolov (MKD)
7 March 2020; 17:15 CEST (UTC+02:00)	3× (yellow card) 4× (suspension) 1× (red card)	Report	3× (yellow card) 6× (suspension) 1× (red card)	Tatran Handball Arena, Prešov; Attendance: 1,439; Referees: Nachevski, Nikolov (MKD)

11 March 2020; 20:00 CEST (UTC+02:00)	PPD Zagreb (Croatia)	28–16	(Slovakia) Tatran Prešov	Dom sportova 2, Zagreb; Attendance: 0 Referees: Todorovski, Mitrevski (MKD)
11 March 2020; 20:00 CEST (UTC+02:00)	Božović, Horvat 6	(12–9)	Pacheco 4	Dom sportova 2, Zagreb; Attendance: 0 Referees: Todorovski, Mitrevski (MKD)
11 March 2020; 20:00 CEST (UTC+02:00)	1× (yellow card) 2× (suspension)	Report	2× (yellow card) 2× (suspension)	Dom sportova 2, Zagreb; Attendance: 0 Referees: Todorovski, Mitrevski (MKD)

PPD Zagreb won 53–37 on aggregate.

== Final Four ==
The four winners of the quarter-final matches qualify for the right to contest the SEHA final four. The SEHA - Gazprom League Executive Committee had made the decision for the final four tournament to be held at the Krešimir Ćosić Hall in Zadar, Croatia, on 3 and 5 April 2020. Due to the current situation in the spread of COVID-19 across Europe and further objective reasons, SEHA Executive Committee has made a decision to postpone the Final 4 indefinitely. All further updates will be published accordingly. On 11 August 2020 the SEHA - Gazprom League Executive Committee announced the decision for the final four tournament to be held at the Krešimir Ćosić Hall in Zadar, Croatia, on 4 and 6 September 2020.

=== Bracket ===
Semifinals
4 Sep
(North Macedonia) Vardar 1961 (Pen.)	30
(Croatia) PPD Zagreb	29
4 Sep
(Hungary) Telekom Veszprém	28
(Belarus) Meshkov Brest	24

Final
6 Sep
(North Macedonia) Vardar 1961	27
(Hungary) Telekom Veszprém	35
Third place
6 Sep
(Croatia) PPD Zagreb	24
(Belarus) Meshkov Brest	29

==== Semifinals ====
4 September 2020
20:30 CEST (UTC+02:00)
Vardar 1961 (North Macedonia)
30–29
(Croatia) PPD Zagreb
Krešimir Ćosić Hall, Zadar
Attendance: 500
Referees: Boričić, Marković (SRB)
Dibirov, Dissinger 5
(13–16)
Mandić 7
2× (yellow card) 1× (suspension)
Report
5× (yellow card) 2× (suspension)

FT: 26–26 Pen: 4–3

4 September 2020; 18:00 CEST (UTC+02:00)	Telekom Veszprém (Hungary)	28–24	(Belarus) Meshkov Brest	Krešimir Ćosić Hall, Zadar; Attendance: 500; Referees: Jurinović, Mrvica (CRO)
4 September 2020; 18:00 CEST (UTC+02:00)	Marguč, Nenadić 6	(12–13)	Panić, Shkurinskiy 6	Krešimir Ćosić Hall, Zadar; Attendance: 500; Referees: Jurinović, Mrvica (CRO)
4 September 2020; 18:00 CEST (UTC+02:00)	5× (yellow card) 2× (suspension)	Report	2× (yellow card) 2× (suspension)	Krešimir Ćosić Hall, Zadar; Attendance: 500; Referees: Jurinović, Mrvica (CRO)

==== Match for third place ====
6 September 2020; 18:00 CEST (UTC+02:00)	PPD Zagreb (Croatia)	24–29	(Belarus) Meshkov Brest	Krešimir Ćosić Hall, Zadar; Attendance: 500; Referees: Mitrevski, Todorovski (MKD)
6 September 2020; 18:00 CEST (UTC+02:00)	Obradović 5	(12–14)	Yurynok 7	Krešimir Ćosić Hall, Zadar; Attendance: 500; Referees: Mitrevski, Todorovski (MKD)
6 September 2020; 18:00 CEST (UTC+02:00)	4× (yellow card) 3× (suspension)	Report	6× (yellow card) 4× (suspension)	Krešimir Ćosić Hall, Zadar; Attendance: 500; Referees: Mitrevski, Todorovski (MKD)

==== Final ====
6 September 2020; 20:30 CEST (UTC+02:00)	Vardar 1961 (North Macedonia)	27–35	(Hungary) Telekom Veszprém	Krešimir Ćosić Hall, Zadar; Attendance: 500; Referees: Gubica, Milošević (CRO)
6 September 2020; 20:30 CEST (UTC+02:00)	Kalarash 6	(12–15)	Nenadić 5	Krešimir Ćosić Hall, Zadar; Attendance: 500; Referees: Gubica, Milošević (CRO)
6 September 2020; 20:30 CEST (UTC+02:00)	5× (yellow card) 2× (suspension)	Report	2× (yellow card) 2× (suspension)	Krešimir Ćosić Hall, Zadar; Attendance: 500; Referees: Gubica, Milošević (CRO)

== Top goalscorers ==
Rank	Player	Club	Goals
1	(Belarus) Mikita Vailupau	(Belarus) Meshkov Brest	111
2	(Croatia) Lovro Jotić	(North Macedonia) Eurofarm Pelister	68
3	(Russia) Timur Dibirov	(North Macedonia) Vardar 1961	66

== Awards ==
The all-star team was announced on 6 September 2020.

- Goalkeeper: Rodrigo Corrales (ESP)
- Right wing: Gašper Marguč (SLO)
- Right back: Jorge Maqueda (ESP)
- Centre back: Lovro Jotić (CRO)
- Left back: Alexander Shkurinskiy (RUS)
- Left wing: David Mandić (CRO)
- Pivot: Andreas Nilsson (SWE)
- Best Defender: Blaž Blagotinšek (SLO)
- MVP of the Final four: Rodrigo Corrales (ESP)
