= Blaž Blagotinšek =

Slovenian handball player (born 1994)

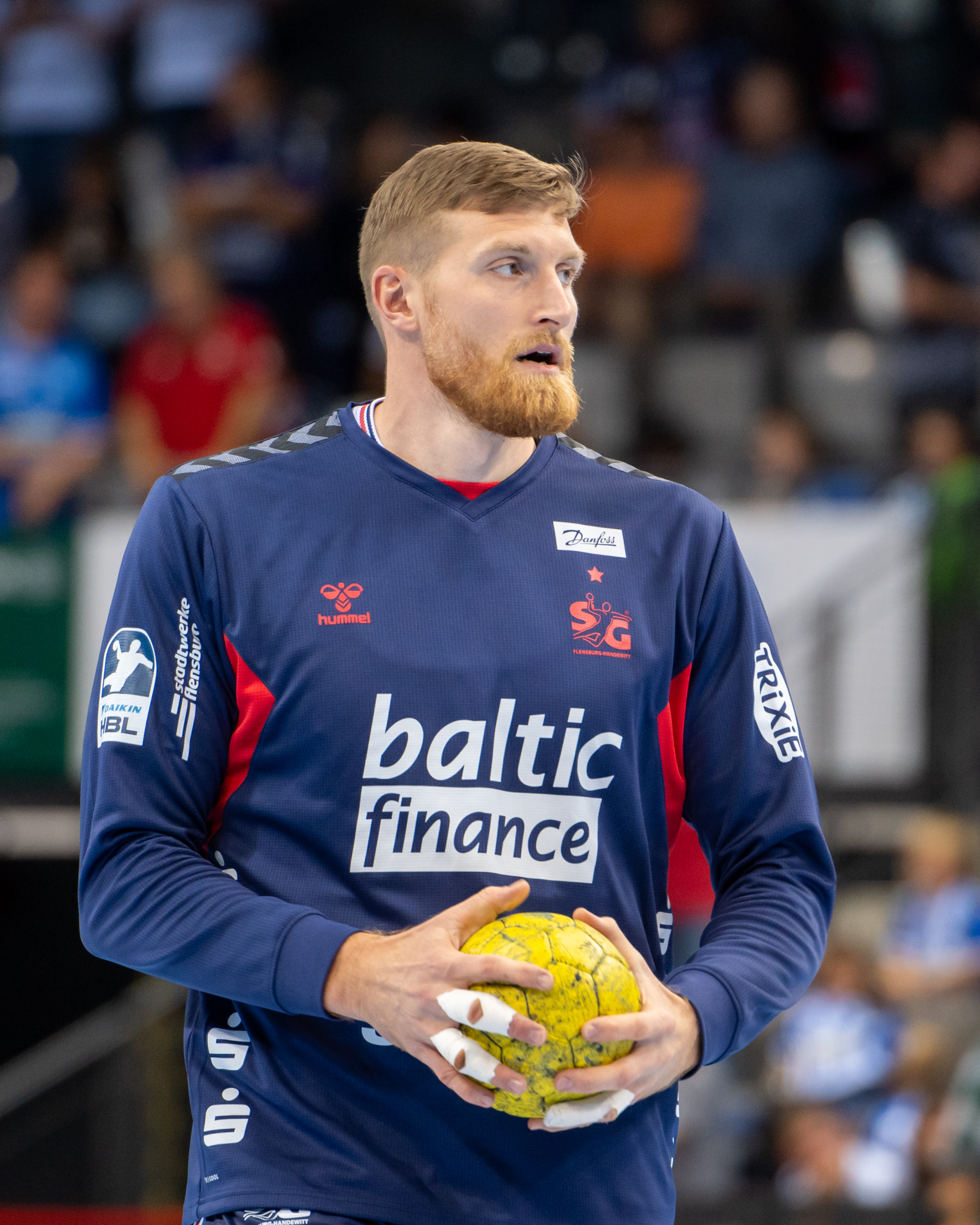
- Blagotinšek in 2024

Personal information
- Nationality: Slovenian
- Born: 17 January 1994 (age 32) Celje, Slovenia
- Height: 2.03 m (6 ft 8 in)

Sport
- Sport: Handball
- Position: Pivot
- Current club: SG Flensburg-Handewitt
- Number: 43

Senior clubs
- Years: Team
- 2012–2016: RK Celje
- 2016–2022: Telekom Veszprém
- 2022–2023: Frisch Auf Göppingen
- 2023–: SG Flensburg-Handewitt
National team
Years	Team	Apps	(Gls)
2012–	Slovenia	155	(267)
Medal record
World Championship
Bronze medal – third place	2017 France
- Updated on 24 January 2026

Blaž Blagotinšek (born 17 January 1994) is a Slovenian handball player who plays for SG Flensburg-Handewitt and the Slovenia national team.

== Career ==
=== Club ===
Blagotinšek was a member of Slovenian club RK Celje until 2016, when he joined Hungarian team Veszprém. In his last season with Celje, he scored 30 goals in the 2015–16 EHF Champions League.

=== National team ===
In 2012, at the age of 18, Blagotinšek was included in the Slovenia national team squad for the first time. He played in the qualifiers for the 2014 European Championship.

He represented Slovenia at the 2024 Summer Olympics.

== Honours ==
=== Individual ===
- SEHA League All-Star Team Best Defensive Player: 2019–20, 2020–21
