= José Toledo =

Brazilian handball player (born 1994)

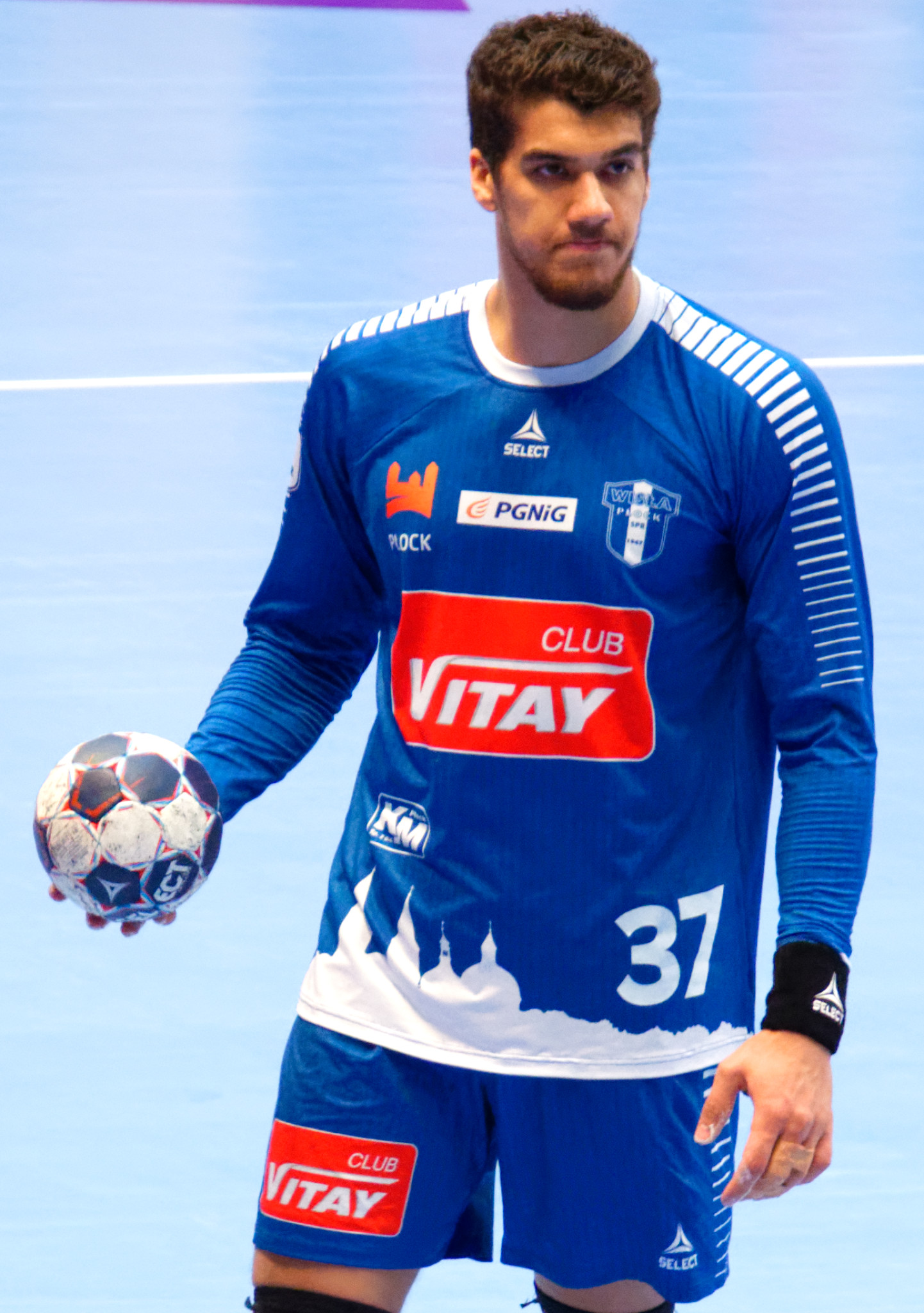
- Toledo in 2016

Personal information
- Full name: José Guilherme de Toledo
- Born: 11 January 1994 (age 32) São Paulo, Brazil
- Height: 1.93 m (6 ft 4 in)

Sport
- Sport: Handball
- Position: Right back
- Current club: Recoletas Atlético Valladolid
- Number: 73

Senior clubs
- Years: Team
- –2014: Handebol Itapema
- 2014–2015: BM Granollers
- 2015–2019: Wisła Płock
- 2019–2020: RK Vardar
- 2020–2021: Minaur Baia Mare
- 2022–: Recoletas Atlético Valladolid
National team
Years	Team	Apps	(Gls)
2015–	Brazil	82	(261)
Medal record
Pan American Games
Silver medal – second place	2023 Santiago	Team
Pan American Championship
Gold medal – first place	2016 Argentina
Silver medal – second place	2018 Greenland
South American Games
Gold medal – first place	2018 Cochabamba	Team

José Guilherme de Toledo (born 11 January 1994) is a Brazilian handball player who plays for Recoletas Atlético Valladolid and the Brazilian national team.

== Career ==
José Toledo was born in São Paulo and started to play handball in the local club Handebol Itapema. In August 2013, Toledo was called up to the national youth team of Brazil for the World Championship campaign. Toledo led his national team to the 9th place after beating Spain in the group stage and Hungary in the 9th place game. He finished the tournament as the top goalscorer, with 64 goals.

One year later, in the summer of 2014, Toledo signed a three-year contract with Spanish team BM Granollers. In his first season in European handball, Toledo scored 107 goals in 27 appearances in all competitions, which made him a key player in the rotation of BM Granollers, one of the most successful clubs in Spain. Toledo started the following season with 47 goals in nine games in Liga ASOBAL.

In November 2015, he joined Polish powerhouse Wisła Płock on a two-year contract. He made his debut in EHF Champions League against Beşiktaş, scoring four goals. He finished his first season with 82 goals, 30 of which were scored in the Champions League.

Toledo was part of the squad of Brazil senior team to the 2015 World Championship in Qatar. He also won the 2016 Pan-American Championship with Brazil and was part of the squad in the 2016 Olympic Games in Rio de Janeiro.

== Achievements ==
- 2018 Pan American Men's Handball Championship: Best right back
