= Abel Serdio =

Spanish handball player (born 1994)

Personal information
- Full name: Abel Serdio Guntín
- Nationality: Spanish
- Born: 16 April 1994 (age 32) Avilés, Spain
- Height: 1.95 m (6 ft 5 in)

Sport
- Sport: Handball
- Position: Pivot
- Current club: Wisła Płock
- Number: 17

Senior clubs
- Years: Team
- 2013–2016: AB Gijón Jovellanos
- 2016–2019: Recoletas Atlético Valladolid
- 2019–2021: FC Barcelona
- 2020–2021: → Wisła Płock (loan)
- 2021–: Wisła Płock
National team
Years	Team	Apps	(Gls)
2018–	Spain	56	(111)
Medal record
Olympic Games
Bronze medal – third place	2024 Paris	Team
World Championship
Bronze medal – third place	2023 Poland/Sweden
- Updated on 13 January 2025

Abel Serdio Guntín (Note: In this Spanish name, the first or paternal surname is Serdio and the second or maternal family name is Guntín.) (born 16 April 1994) is a Spanish handball player for Wisła Płock and the Spanish national team.
