= Mikita Vailupau =

Belarusian handball player

Nikita Vailupau
Personal information
- Nationality: Belarusian
- Born: 30 July 1995 (age 31) Vitebsk, Belarus
- Height: 1.86 m (6 ft 1 in)

Sport
- Sport: Handball
- Position: Right wing
- Current club: S.L. Benfica
- Number: 55

Senior clubs
- Years: Team
- 2012–2014: Dinamo Minsk
- 2014–2019: SKA Minsk
- 2019–2022: HC Meshkov Brest
- 2022–2025: ONE Veszprém
- 2025–: S.L. Benfica
National team
Years	Team	Apps	(Gls)
2015–	Belarus	51	(230)

Nikita Vailupau (Belarusian: Nікіта Юр’евіч Вайлупаў, born 30 July 1995) is a Belarusian handball player for S.L. Benfica and the Belarusian national team.

== Club career ==
Vailupau started to play handball in Vitebsk. He played for SKA Minsk in 2014–2019. In 2019, Vailupau signed 3-year contract with HC Meshkov Brest.

On 3 October 2019 Vailupau scored 20 goals in SEHA League match against RK Metaloplastika. It's a record for the goals in one match of SEHA League.

On 5 November Vailupau scored 14 goals in the away match of SEHA League against RK Eurofarm Pelister from North Macedonia (35:32). On 23 November Mikita scored 12 goals after 12 shots in a match in the EHF Champions League against RK Vardar (31:22), becoming the best goalscorer of the match.

== International career ==
On 25 October 2018 Mikita scored game high 6 goals in Euro 2020 qualification match against Bosnia and Herzegovina in Minsk (29:30).

== Achievements ==
- SEHA League
  - Gold: 2022
- Belarusian First League
  - Gold: 2020, 2021, 2022
- Hungarian First League
  - Gold: 2023, 2024, 2025
- Hungarian Cup
  - Gold: 2023, 2024
