= Rodrigo Corrales =

Spanish handball player (born 1991)

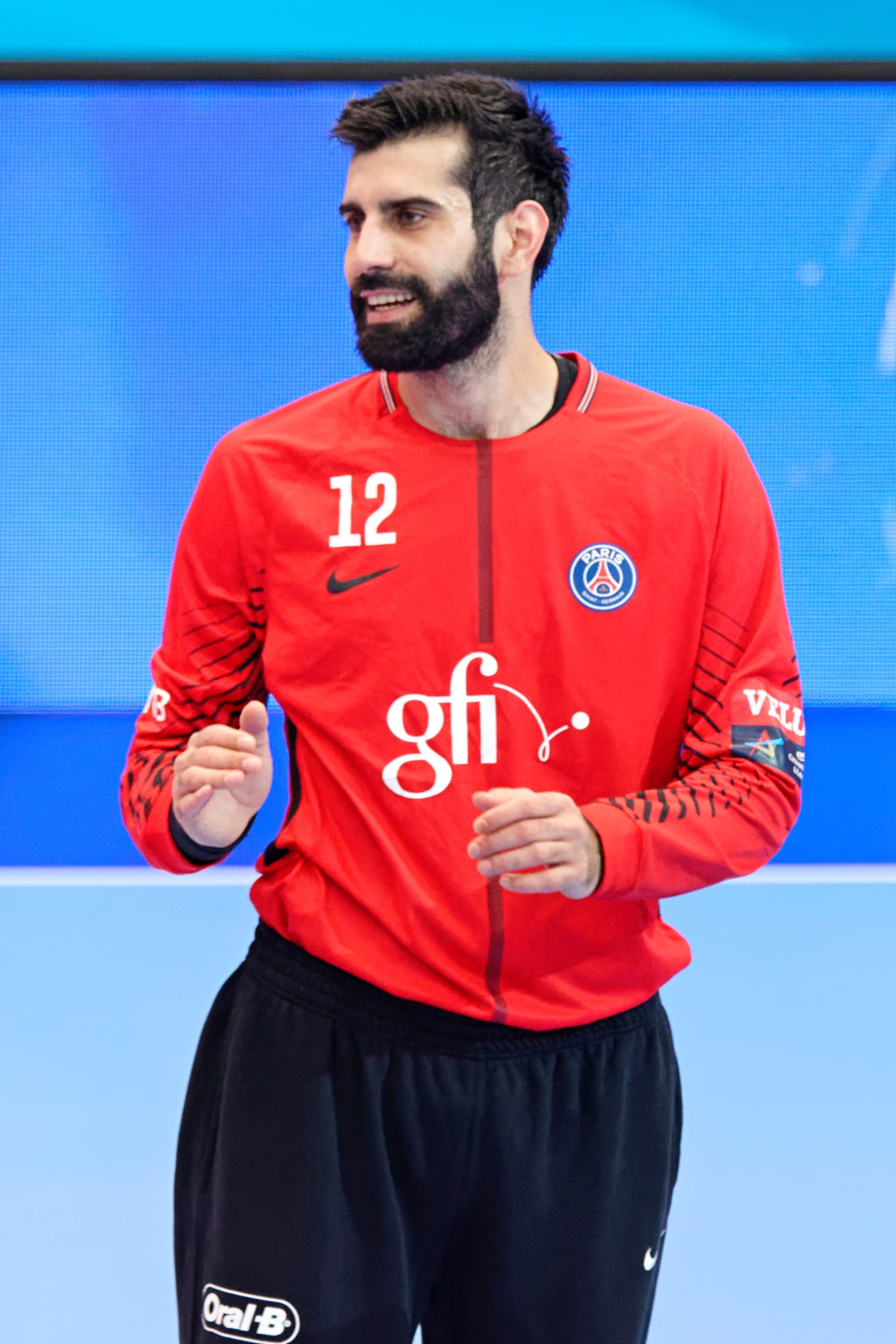
- Corrales in 2017

Personal information
- Full name: Rodrigo Corrales Rodal
- Nationality: Spanish
- Born: 24 January 1991 (age 35) Cangas, Spain
- Height: 2.02 m (6 ft 8 in)

Sport
- Sport: Handball
- Position: Goalkeeper
- Current club: Paris Saint-Germain
- Number: 12

Youth career
- Years: Team
- 2006–2009: FC Barcelona

Senior clubs
- Years: Team
- 2009–2016: FC Barcelona
- 2012–2014: → BM Huesca (loan)
- 2014–2016: → Wisła Płock (loan)
- 2016–2017: Wisła Płock
- 2017–2020: Paris Saint-Germain
- 2020–2026: ONE Veszprém
- 2026–: Paris Saint-Germain
National team
Years	Team	Apps	(Gls)
2014–	Spain	141	(4)
Medal record
Olympic Games
Bronze medal – third place	2020 Tokyo	Team
Bronze medal – third place	2024 Paris	Team
World Championship
Bronze medal – third place	2021 Egypt
Bronze medal – third place	2023 Poland/Sweden
European Championship
Gold medal – first place	2018 Croatia
Gold medal – first place	2020 Sweden/Austria/Norway
Silver medal – second place	2022 Hungary/Slovakia
- Updated on 30 December 2024

Rodrigo Corrales Rodal (Note: In this Spanish name, the first or paternal surname is Corrales and the second or maternal family name is Rodal.) (born 24 January 1991) is a Spanish handball player for Paris Saint-Germain and the Spanish national handball team.

He participated at the 2017 World Men's Handball Championship.

== Individual awards ==
- MVP of the SEHA League Final Four: 2019-20
- SEHA League All-Star Team Best Goalkeeper: 2019-20
- French Championship Best Goalkeeper: 2020
