= David Pisonero =

Spanish handball player (born 1973)

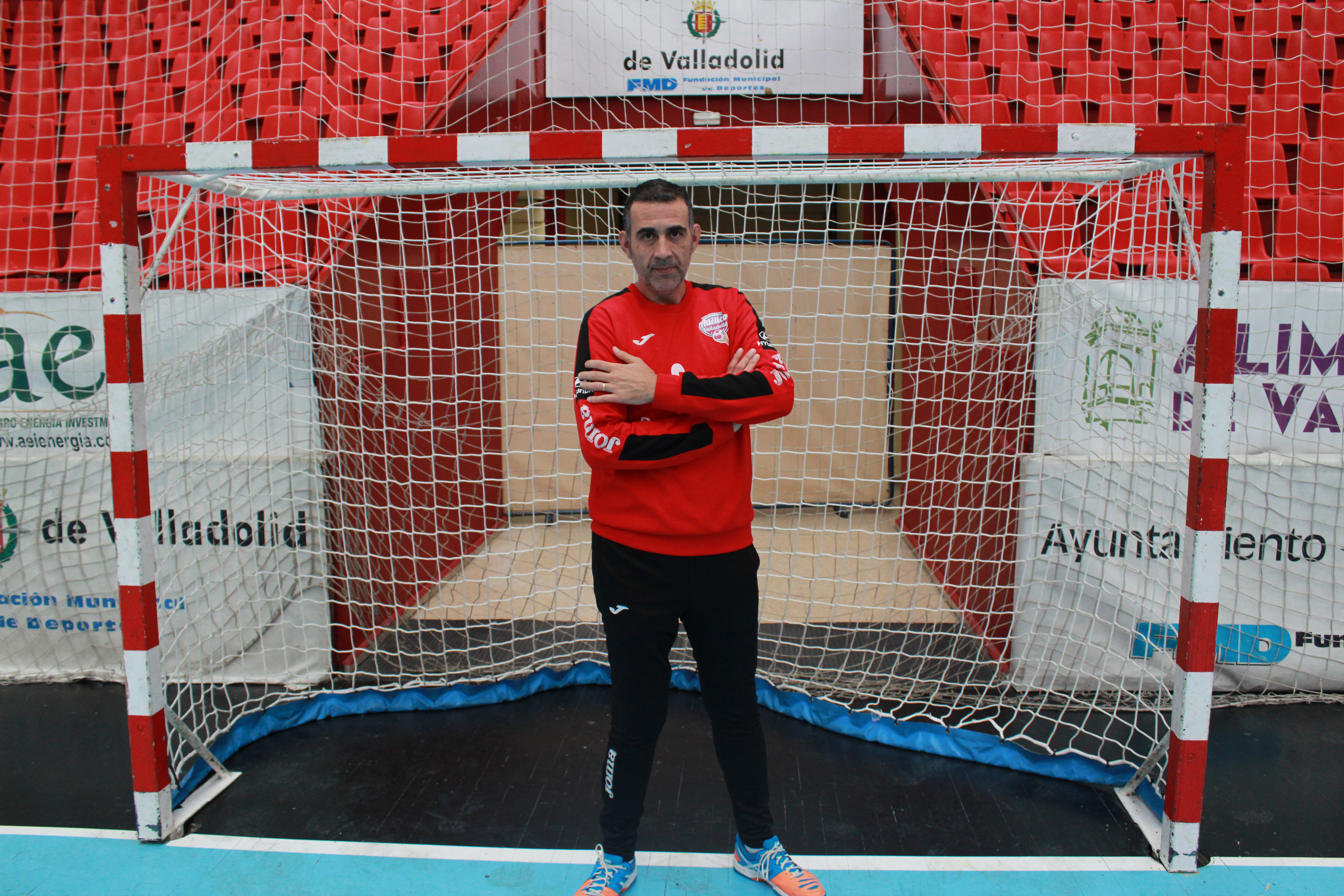

Personal information
- Full name: David Pisonero Nieto
- Nationality: Spanish
- Born: 10 April 1973 (age 53) Valladolid, Spain

Sport
- Sport: Handball
- Position: Pivot

Senior clubs
- Years: Team
- 1990–1995: BM Valladolid
- 1995–1997: CB Cantabria
- 1997–1998: CB Ademar León
- 1998–2003: BM Valladolid

Teams managed
- 2017–2019: Recoletas Atlético Valladolid
- 2019: RK Vardar
- 2019: RK Vardar (assistant)
- 2020–: Recoletas Atlético Valladolid
- 2024–: Israel

David Pisonero Nieto (born 10 April 1973) is a former Spanish handball player.

He developed his career in the pivot position.

== Career ==
David Pisonero developed his career as a player from 1990 to 2003. From 2017 he retired and continued as a coach.

=== As a player ===
- (Spain) BM Valladolid: 1990–1995
- (Spain) CB Cantabria: 1995–1997
- (Spain) CB Ademar León: 1997–1998
- (Spain) BM Valladolid: 1998–2003

=== As a coach ===
- (Spain) Recoletas Atlético Valladolid: 2017–2019
- (North Macedonia) RK Vardar: 2019
- (North Macedonia) RK Vardar (assistant): 2019
- (Spain) Recoletas Atlético Valladolid: 2020–

== Honors ==
- Copa ASOBAL (2): 1996, 2002
- IHF Super Globe (1): 1997
