= Andreas Nilsson (handballer) =

Swedish handball player (born 1990)

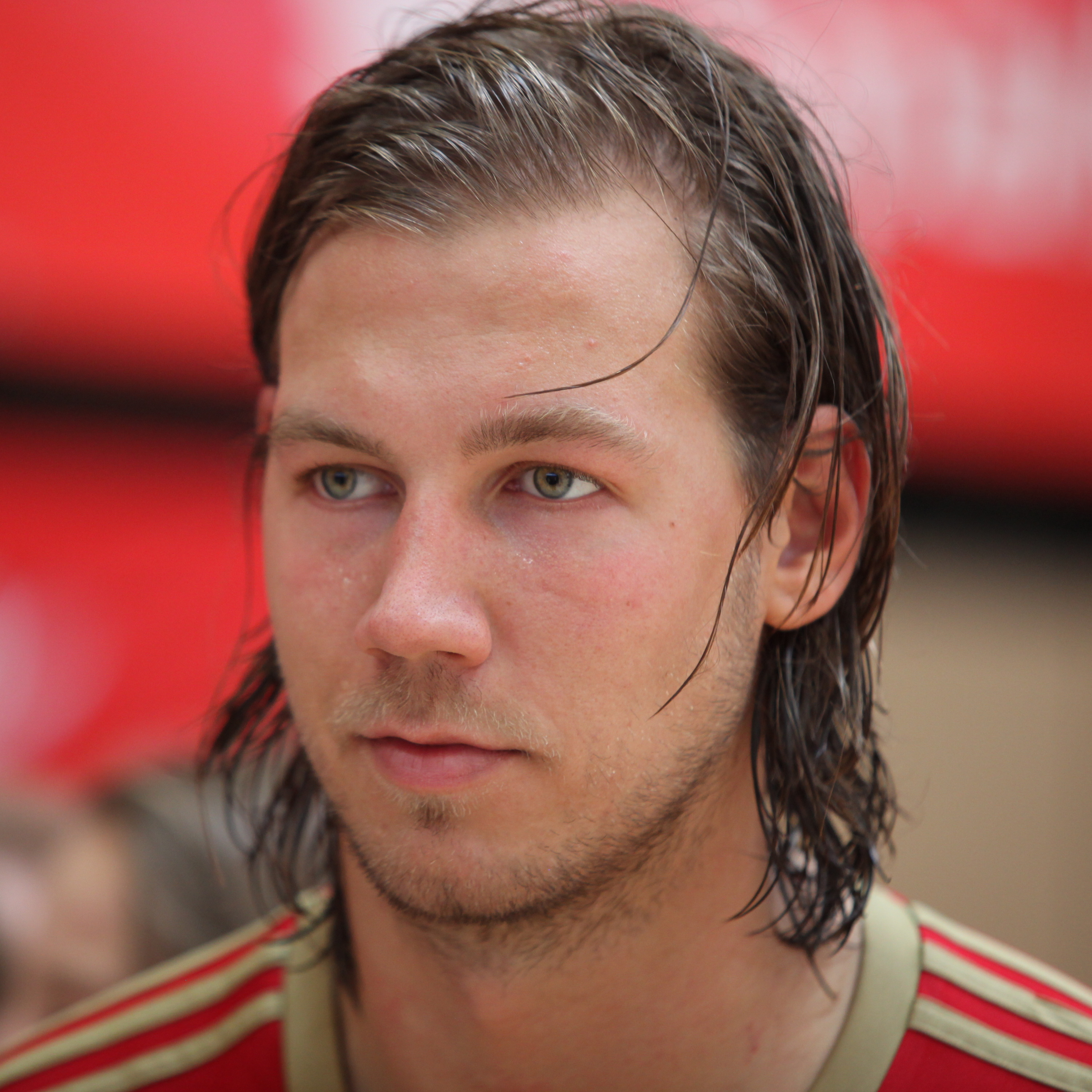

Personal information
- Nationality: Swedish
- Born: 12 April 1990 (age 36) Trelleborg, Sweden
- Height: 1.97 m (6 ft 6 in)

Sport
- Sport: Handball
- Position: Pivot
- Current club: Önnereds HK

Youth career
- Years: Team
- –2007: IFK Trelleborg

Senior clubs
- Years: Team
- 2007–2009: IFK Trelleborg
- 2009–2012: IFK Skövde
- 2012–2014: HSV Hamburg
- 2014–2024: Telekom Veszprém
- 2024–: Önnereds HK
National team
Years	Team	Apps	(Gls)
2010–	Sweden	154	(350)
Medal record
Olympic Games
Silver medal – second place	2012 London	Team
European Championship
Bronze medal – third place	2024 Germany
- Updated on 14 August 2024

Andreas Nilsson (born 12 April 1990) is a Swedish handball player for Önnereds HK and the Swedish national team.

He competed for the Swedish national team at the 2012 Summer Olympics in London, winning a silver medal, and the 2016 Summer Olympics in Rio. Nilsson won the EHF Champions League with HSV Hamburg during the 2012–13 season.

On 12 June 2016 he was chosen as Swedish "Handballer of the Year".

On the Swedish national team he goes by the nickname 'Stycket' (eng:meat lump).

== Honours ==
=== Individual ===
- SEHA League All-Star Team Best Line Player: 2019–20
- Swedish Handballer of the Year 2016
