= Gašper Marguč =

Slovenian handball player (born 1990)

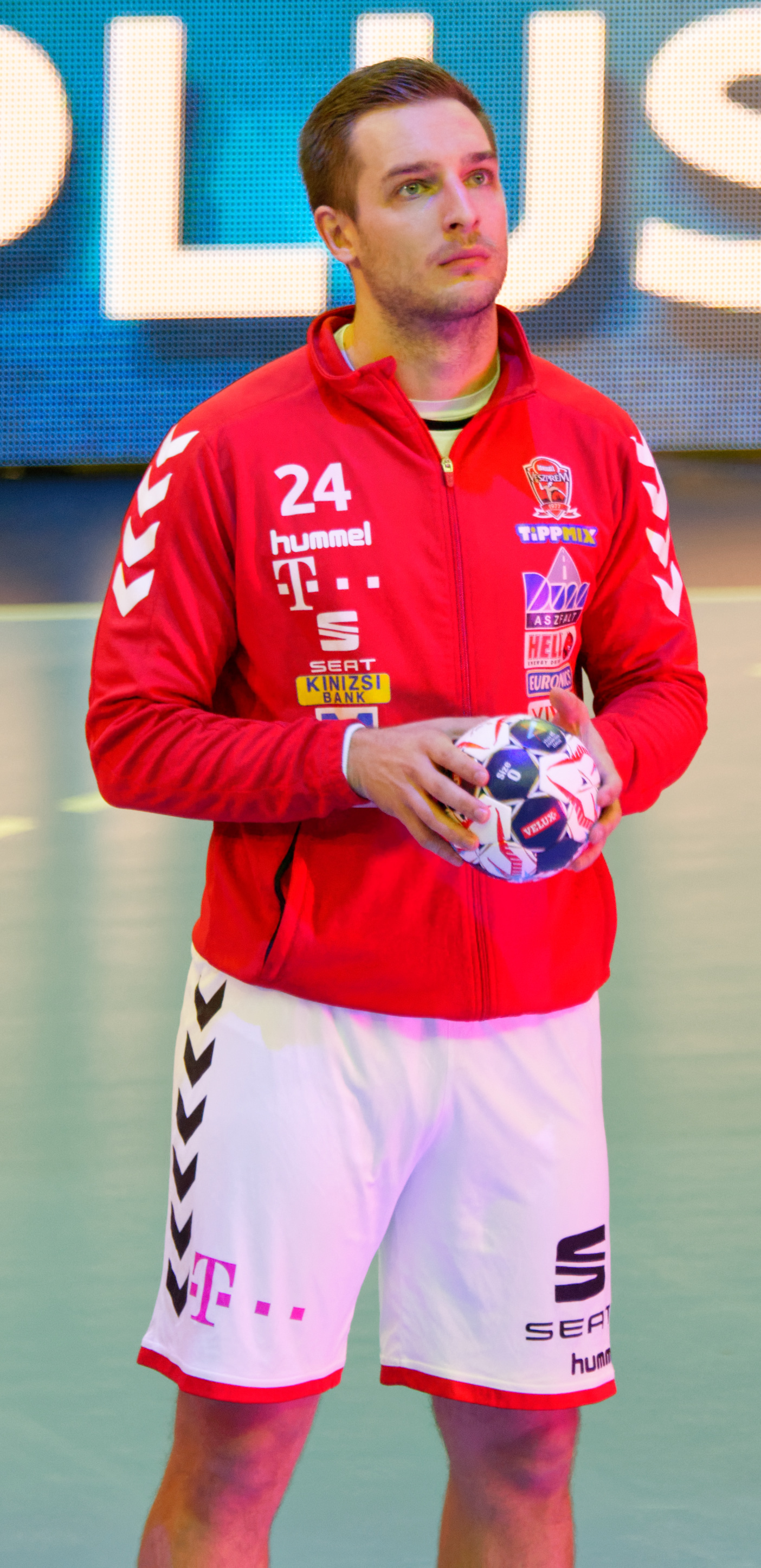

Personal information
- Nationality: Slovenian
- Born: 20 August 1990 (age 36) Celje, SFR Yugoslavia
- Height: 1.81 m (5 ft 11 in)

Sport
- Sport: Handball
- Position: Right wing
- Current club: RK Celje
- Number: 30

Senior clubs
- Years: Team
- 2009–2014: RK Celje
- 2014–2026: Veszprém
- 2026–: RK Celje
National team
Years	Team	Apps	(Gls)
2010–	Slovenia	134	(459)
Medal record
World Championship
Bronze medal – third place	2017 France
- Updated on 26 January 2024

Gašper Marguč (born 20 August 1990) is a Slovenian handball player who plays for RK Celje and the Slovenia national team.

He represented Slovenia first at the 2012 European Championship, then at the 2013 World Championship and also at the 2016 European Championship.

== Honours ==
=== Individual ===
- SEHA League All-Star Team Best Right Winger: 2019–20
