= Dragan Pechmalbec =

Serbian handball player (born 1999)

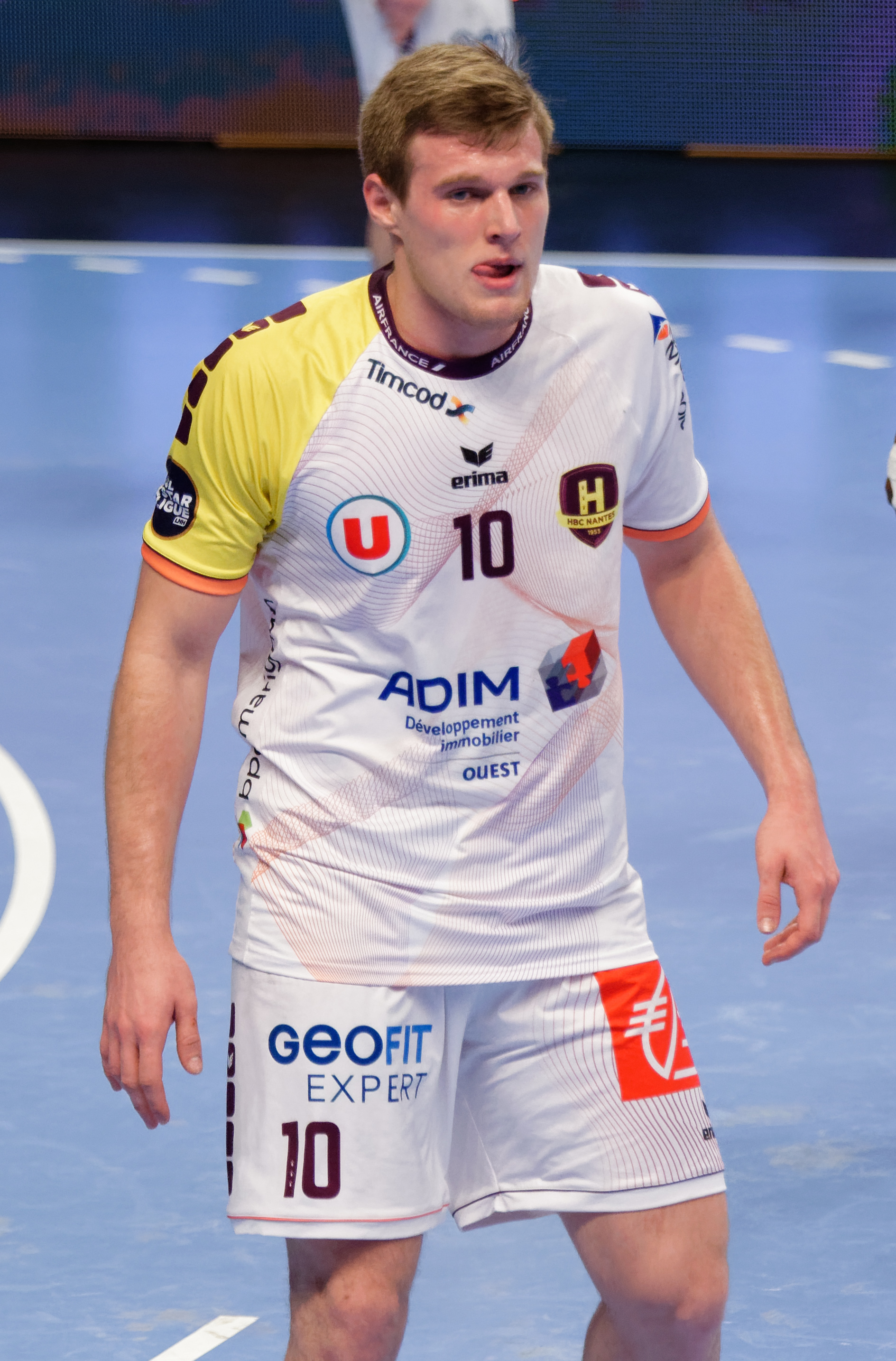

Personal information
- Nationality: French/Serbian
- Born: 5 January 1996 (age 30) Cahors, France
- Height: 1.94 m (6 ft 4 in)

Sport
- Sport: Handball
- Position: Pivot
- Current club: ONE Veszprém
- Number: 46

Youth career
- Years: Team
- 2009–2016: CPB Rennes

Senior clubs
- Years: Team
- 2016–2022: HBC Nantes
- 2022–: ONE Veszprém
National team
Years	Team	Apps	(Gls)
2018	France	3	(0)
2021–	Serbia	23	(66)

Dragan Pechmalbec (born 5 January 1996) is a French-born Serbian handball player for ONE Veszprém and the Serbia national team.

He has a French father and a Serbian mother.

== Career ==
Pechmalbec began his career in his birth country, France. He shot to prominence with HBC Nantes, where he won the Coupe de France in 2017, in a victory in the final over Montpellier Handball. He was also a runner-up three times in the French top division, and once in the 2017–18 EHF Champions League. Despite making his debut for France, he declared for the Serbia national team in 2021, making his debut for them that year. He has played for Serbia at the 2023 World Men's Handball Championship and the 2024 European Men's Handball Championship.
