= 2020–21 SEHA League =

2020–21 SEHA League season
- League: SEHA League
- Sport: Handball
- Duration: 17 December 2020–5 September 2021
- Teams: 10; Croatia (2 teams); North Macedonia (2 teams); Serbia (2 teams); Belarus (1 team); Hungary (1 team); Slovakia (1 team); Ukraine (1 team)
- Top scorer: (Russia) Timur Dibirov (Vardar 1961) (57 goals)

Final Four
- Finals champions: (Hungary) Telekom Veszprém (4th title)

SEHA League seasons
- 2019–20 2021–22

The 2020–21 SEHA League was the 10th season of the SEHA (South East Handball Association) League and seventh under the sponsorship of the Russian oil and gas company Gazprom. Ten teams from seven countries (Belarus, Croatia, Hungary, North Macedonia, Serbia, Slovakia and Ukraine participated in this year's competition.

== Competition format ==
The competition began with a group stage featuring 10 teams divided in two groups. Matches were played in a double round-robin system with home-and-away fixtures. In Groups A and B, the top two teams qualify for the quarterfinals, with teams ranked 3rd and 4th entering the playoffs. After conducted analysis and due to occasions occurred by global COVID-19 pandemic, along with correlation of European calendar issues, on 14 December 2020 in a meeting, the SEHA–Gazprom League Executive Committee has decided that, two clubs, Telekom Veszprém (2019/20 winner) and Meshkov Brest (COVID-19 issues) were directly included in the quarterfinals and not play in the Group phase.

Play-offs

In the play-offs, teams ranked 3rd and 4th in Group A and B are paired against each other in two-legged home-and-away matches. The two aggregate winners of the playoffs will advance to the quarter-finals joining the top-two teams of Groups A and B and Telekom Veszprém and Meshkov Brest who will directly play in the quarter-finals.

Quarter-finals

The two winners of the matches in the play-off phase, joined by the top two of Groups A and B, and Telekom Veszprém and Meshkov Brest, who are playing directly in the quarter-finals will play in home and away for the right to contest the SEHA Final 4.

SEHA Final 4

The culmination of the season, the SEHA Final 4, continues in its existing format, with the four top teams from the competition competing for the title over one weekend.

== Team information ==
The SEHA – Gazprom League Executive Committee made a decision that 10 participants will play in this season.

=== Venues and locations ===
Country	Team	City	Venue (Capacity)
Belarus	Meshkov Brest	Brest	Universal Sports Complex Victoria (3,740)
Croatia	Nexe	Našice	Sportska dvorana kralja Tomislava (2,500)
Croatia	PPD Zagreb	Zagreb	Dom sportova 2 (3,100)
Hungary	Telekom Veszprém	Veszprém	Veszprém Aréna (5,096)
North Macedonia	Eurofarm Pelister	Bitola	Sports Hall Boro Čurlevski (3,700)
North Macedonia	Vardar 1961	Skopje	Jane Sandanski Arena (6,500)
Serbia	Metaloplastika	Šabac	Zorka Hall (3,000)
Serbia	Vojvodina	Novi Sad	Sportski centar Slana Bara (2,000)
Slovakia	Tatran Prešov	Prešov	Tatran Handball Arena (4,870)
Ukraine	Motor Zaporizhzhia	Zaporizhia	Yunost Sport Hall (3,600)

== Group phase ==
In the group phase, each team played six matches within their respective groups. Three matches were played at home, and three matches away. The final position after the six rounds determined if a club will play in the play-off phase or if they will earn a direct placement to the quarter-finals phase.

=== Group A ===
Pos	Team	Pld	W	D	L	GF	GA	GD	Pts	Qualification	ZAG	PEL	PRE	MET
1	(Croatia) PPD Zagreb	6	4	2	0	133	108	+25	14	Quarter finals	—	26–23	25–20	37–25
2	(North Macedonia) Eurofarm Pelister	6	3	1	2	148	132	+16	10	Quarter finals	5–5	—	28–16	30–26
3	(Slovakia) Tatran Prešov	6	2	1	3	135	148	−13	7	Playoffs	5–5	32–28	—	29–31
4	(Serbia) Metaloplastika	6	1	0	5	170	198	−28	3	Playoffs	30–35	27–34	31–33	—

Source: SEHA

=== Group B ===
Pos	Team	Pld	W	D	L	GF	GA	GD	Pts	Qualification	ZAP	NEX	VAR	VOJ
1	(Ukraine) Motor Zaporizhzhia	6	4	0	2	186	173	+13	12	Quarter finals	—	36–30	30–23	31–30
2	(Croatia) Nexe	6	3	0	3	170	174	−4	9 (Note: Tied on head-to-head points. Head-to-head goal difference: Nexe +3, Vardar 1961 −3.)	Quarter finals	28–35	—	36–32	24–23
3	(North Macedonia) Vardar 1961	6	3	0	3	163	173	−10	9	Playoffs	32–27	27–26	—	25–21
4	(Serbia) Vojvodina	6	2	0	4	158	157	+1	6	Playoffs	30–27	21–26	33–24	—

Source: SEHA

== Playoffs ==
The Play off phase was made up of two matches for each participating team, one match played at home and one match played away. The teams that finished the Group Phase in positions 3–4 played in the Play-off phase.

Team 1	Agg.	Team 2	1st leg	2nd leg
Metaloplastika (Serbia)	54–65	(North Macedonia) Vardar 1961	31–39	23–26
Vojvodina (Serbia)	55–62	(Slovakia) Tatran Prešov	28–40	27–22

== Quarter-finals ==
There will be eight teams competing in the quarter-finals phase. Four teams will have earned a direct placement after the Group Phase, two teams, Telekom Veszprém and Meshkov Brest, directly played in quarter-finals due to COVID-19 pandemic and two additional teams will have earned a quarter-finals spot through the playoff phase.

The matches will be played between 21 and 26 August 2021 (first leg) and 26 and 31 August 2021 (second leg).

Team 1	Agg.	Team 2	1st leg	2nd leg
Vardar 1961 (North Macedonia)	46–45	(Croatia) PPD Zagreb	24–20	22–25
Eurofarm Pelister (North Macedonia)	58–66	(Belarus) Meshkov Brest	27–31	31–35
Tatran Prešov (Slovakia)	41–56	(Ukraine) Motor Zaporizhzhia	22–27	19–29
Nexe (Croatia)	58–65	(Hungary) Telekom Veszprém	33–35	25–30

== Final Four ==
The four winners of the quarter-final matches qualify for the right to contest the SEHA final four. The Final Four will be played between 3 and 5 September 2021.

Because the health authorities of the Republic of Croatia conducted COVID-19 tests on the team of HC Vardar 1961 on 31 August 2021, and received a positive test for one team member, they imposed isolation for the positive-tested team member and people who were in contact with this team member, while for the rest of the team there was a possibility of a virus transmission. The Executive Committee made a decision that HC Vardar 1961 was excluded from the Final 4. Since HC PPD Zagreb was playing against HC Vardar 1961 in the quarter-finals of the competition, and because they were the best ranked team of the regular part of the season, the Executive Committee also made a decision that HC PPD Zagreb would be invited to the Final 4 as a substitute team.

=== Bracket ===
Semifinals
3 September – Zadar, Croatia
(Belarus) Meshkov Brest	32 (5)
(Croatia) PPD Zagreb (pen)	32 (6)
3 September – Zadar, Croatia
(Hungary) Telekom Veszprém	36
(Ukraine) Motor Zaporizhzhia	29

Final
5 September – Zadar, Croatia
(Croatia) PPD Zagreb	27 (2)
(Hungary) Telekom Veszprém (pen)	27 (4)
Third place
5 September – Zadar, Croatia
(Belarus) Meshkov Brest	20
(Ukraine) Motor Zaporizhzhia	31
