= 2024 European Men's Handball Championship qualification =

Qualification for the 2024 European Men's Handball Championship

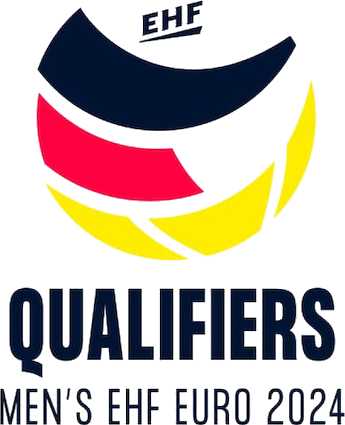
Logo of the qualifiers

This article describes the qualification process for the EHF EURO 2024 and EHF Euro Cup. In total 32 teams competed for 20 places at the final tournament, while 4 teams contested the EHF Euro Cup.

== Format ==
Prior to the qualifiers, four teams were automatically qualified:

- Germany as a host
- three best placed teams from 2022 European Men's Handball Championship

Originally, the qualification process was about to start with Phase 1 in March 2021. The two best-placed teams from that phase would qualify for the relegation round along with the winner of the 2021 edition of the IHF Emerging Nations Championship. However, after postponing the Qualification Phase 1 and cancellation of the IHF Emerging Nations Championship, both caused by the COVID-19 pandemic, those two tournaments were merged into 2021 Men's IHF/EHF Trophy. The three best-ranked teams from that tournament qualified for the relegation round.

Relegation Round involved eight teams:

- three entries from the IHF/EHF Trophy,
- Luxembourg as the best ranked team according to EHF ranking which haven't participate in the final phase of the previous qualification
- Four worst-ranked fourth placed teams from the EHF EURO 2022 qualifiers

The four winners advanced to the qualifiers – the latest stage of this qualification campaign.

Qualifiers involved 32 teams:

- four teams advanced from the relegation round
- eight remaining teams from the EHF EURO 2022 qualifiers which failed to qualify for the final tournament
- twenty teams which participated at EHF EURO 2022, but not directly qualified for EHF EURO 2024

== Qualification phase 1 ==
Since only four teams would have participated in this round, no draw was needed. This phase was planned to be played in a tournament format. On 15 February 2021 the EHF announced that the tournament was postponed to 30 April to 2 May due to the COVID-19 pandemic.

On 26 March 2021, the Qualification Phase 1 was cancelled and replaced with the IHF/EHF Trophy.

== IHF/EHF Trophy ==
After the 2021 IHF Emerging Nations Championship was cancelled, the EHF announced in March 2021, that the IHF/EHF Trophy would take place in Tbilisi, Georgia, from 14 to 19 June 2021. The three best teams qualified for the relegation round.

Rank	Team
1st place, gold medalist(s)	Georgia
2nd place, silver medalist(s)	Cyprus
3rd place, bronze medalist(s)	Bulgaria
4	Moldova
5	Andorra; Azerbaijan

== Relegation round ==
The four worst-ranked fourth placed teams from the previous cycle join in this round. The draw took place on 19 August 2021, when the teams were paired in four two-legged ties.

=== Seeding ===
The seeding was announced on 18 August 2021. Teams relegated from the 2022 European Men's Handball Championship qualification were placed into the seeding pot 2.

Pot 1	Pot 2
Luxembourg; Georgia; Cyprus; Bulgaria	Finland; Belgium; Turkey; Latvia

=== Overview ===
All matches were played in January 2022.

Team 1	Agg.	Team 2	1st leg	2nd leg
Turkey	64–54	Cyprus	35–28	29–26
Georgia	45–52	Finland	22–22	23–30
Latvia	72–55	Bulgaria	36–23	36–32
Luxembourg	53–59	Belgium	26–32	27–27

=== Matches ===
All times are local.

19 January 2022; 18:00	Turkey	35–28	Cyprus	Haldun Alagaş Sports Hall, Istanbul; Attendance: 1,230; Referees: Boričić, Marković (SRB)
19 January 2022; 18:00	Kanberoğlu 8	(17–14)	Argyrou 11	Haldun Alagaş Sports Hall, Istanbul; Attendance: 1,230; Referees: Boričić, Marković (SRB)
19 January 2022; 18:00	2× (yellow card) 4× (suspension)	Report	2× (yellow card) 4× (suspension)	Haldun Alagaş Sports Hall, Istanbul; Attendance: 1,230; Referees: Boričić, Marković (SRB)

22 January 2022; 19:00	Cyprus	26–29	Turkey	Eleftheria Indoor Hall, Nicosia; Attendance: 500; Referees: Baďura, Ondogrecula (SVK)
22 January 2022; 19:00	Argyrou, Demosthenous 7	(11–14)	Biçer 12	Eleftheria Indoor Hall, Nicosia; Attendance: 500; Referees: Baďura, Ondogrecula (SVK)
22 January 2022; 19:00	1× (yellow card) 5× (suspension)	Report	1× (yellow card) 4× (suspension)	Eleftheria Indoor Hall, Nicosia; Attendance: 500; Referees: Baďura, Ondogrecula (SVK)

Turkey won 64–54 on aggregate.

5 January 2022; 16:00	Georgia	22–22	Finland	Olympic Palace, Tbilisi; Attendance: 1,500; Referees: V. Butskevich, Y. Butskevich (BLR)
5 January 2022; 16:00	Orjonikidze 7	(8–9)	M. Granlund 6	Olympic Palace, Tbilisi; Attendance: 1,500; Referees: V. Butskevich, Y. Butskevich (BLR)
5 January 2022; 16:00	2× (yellow card) 3× (suspension)	Report	1× (yellow card) 5× (suspension) 1× (red card)	Olympic Palace, Tbilisi; Attendance: 1,500; Referees: V. Butskevich, Y. Butskevich (BLR)

9 January 2022; 15:00	Finland	30–23	Georgia	Energia Areena, Vantaa; Attendance: 0 (Note: The match was played behind closed doors due to the COVID-19 pandemic.); Referees: Leszczyński, Piechota (POL)
9 January 2022; 15:00	Syrjälä, Säkkinen 7	(18–12)	Dikhaminjia 5	Energia Areena, Vantaa; Attendance: 0 Referees: Leszczyński, Piechota (POL)
9 January 2022; 15:00	5× (suspension)	Report	1× (yellow card) 4× (suspension)	Energia Areena, Vantaa; Attendance: 0 Referees: Leszczyński, Piechota (POL)

Finland won 52–45 on aggregate.

22 January 2022 (Note: The matches, originally scheduled for 6 and 9 January 2022, were postponed after several positive COVID-19 tests by the Bulgarian team.); 16:40	Latvia	36–23	Bulgaria	Sports Centre Dobele, Dobele; Attendance: 750; Referees: Kull, Tint (EST)
22 January 2022; 16:40	Kreicbergs 11	(18–10)	Dimitrov, Vasilev 5	Sports Centre Dobele, Dobele; Attendance: 750; Referees: Kull, Tint (EST)
22 January 2022; 16:40	1× (yellow card) 2× (suspension)	Report	1× (yellow card) 5× (suspension)	Sports Centre Dobele, Dobele; Attendance: 750; Referees: Kull, Tint (EST)

23 January 2022; 13:45	Bulgaria	32–36	Latvia	Sports Centre Dobele, Dobele, Latvia; Attendance: 260; Referees: Kull, Tint (EST)
23 January 2022; 13:45	Vasilev 9	(17–19)	Leja 8	Sports Centre Dobele, Dobele, Latvia; Attendance: 260; Referees: Kull, Tint (EST)
23 January 2022; 13:45	1× (yellow card) 1× (suspension)	Report	1× (yellow card) 4× (suspension)	Sports Centre Dobele, Dobele, Latvia; Attendance: 260; Referees: Kull, Tint (EST)

Latvia won 72–55 on aggregate.

20 January 2022; 19:30	Luxembourg	26–32	Belgium	d'Coque, Luxembourg City; Attendance: 531; Referees: Bounouara, Sami (FRA)
20 January 2022; 19:30	Guden 8	(12–12)	Glorieux 8	d'Coque, Luxembourg City; Attendance: 531; Referees: Bounouara, Sami (FRA)
20 January 2022; 19:30	2× (yellow card) 4× (suspension)	Report	1× (yellow card) 2× (suspension)	d'Coque, Luxembourg City; Attendance: 531; Referees: Bounouara, Sami (FRA)

22 January 2022; 20:15	Belgium	27–27	Luxembourg	Stedelijke sporthal Alverberg, Hasselt; Attendance: 0 Referees: Andorka, Hucker (HUN)
22 January 2022; 20:15	Spooren 9	(13–13)	Hoffmann 7	Stedelijke sporthal Alverberg, Hasselt; Attendance: 0 Referees: Andorka, Hucker (HUN)
22 January 2022; 20:15	5× (suspension)	Report	1× (yellow card) 5× (suspension)	Stedelijke sporthal Alverberg, Hasselt; Attendance: 0 Referees: Andorka, Hucker (HUN)

Belgium won 59–53 on aggregate.

== Qualifiers ==
Qualifiers were played between October 2022 and April 2023. Like in previous cycles, 32 teams were divided into eight groups of four, with the winners and runners-up qualifying for the final tournament, together with the four best third-placed teams which were determined taking into account only results against top two teams in each group. The draw took place on 31 March 2022.

=== Participating teams ===
Qualification method	Team(s)
Participated at 2022 European Men's Handball Championship	Austria; ~~Belarus~~^{1} Bosnia and Herzegovina; Croatia; Czech Republic; France; Hungary; Iceland; Lithuania; Montenegro; Netherlands; North Macedonia; Norway; Poland; Portugal; ~~Russia~~^{2} Serbia; Slovakia; Slovenia; Ukraine
Eliminated from the final phase of 2022 European Men's Handball Championship qualification	Estonia; Faroe Islands; Greece; Israel; Italy; Kosovo; Romania; Switzerland
Relegation round winners	Belgium; Finland; Georgia (replacement)^{3} Latvia; Luxembourg (replacement)^{3} Turkey

^{1} Belarus was excluded due to their involvement in the 2022 Russian invasion of Ukraine.
^{2} Russia was excluded due to the 2022 Russian invasion of Ukraine.
^{3} Georgia and Luxembourg, as two teams with the best records among the relegation round losers, replaced Belarus and Russia.

==== Seeding ====
The seeding was announced on 22 March 2022.

Pot 1	Pot 2	Pot 3	Pot 4
Norway; France; Croatia; Slovenia; Hungary; Portugal; Iceland; Austria	Czech Republic; Poland; Netherlands; Montenegro; North Macedonia; Serbia; Switzerland; Ukraine	Bosnia and Herzegovina; Lithuania; Latvia; Israel; Slovakia; Turkey; Romania; Greece	Kosovo; Belgium; Estonia; Faroe Islands; Finland; Italy; Georgia; Luxembourg

=== Groups ===
Matchdays 1,2,5 and 6 are UTC+2, matchdays 3 and 4 are UTC+1.

==== Group 1 ====
Pos	Team	Pld	W	D	L	GF	GA	GD	Pts	Qualification
1	Portugal	6	6	0	0	210	151	+59	12	Final tournament
2	North Macedonia	6	4	0	2	182	162	+20	8	Final tournament
3	Turkey	6	2	0	4	177	196	−19	4	
4	Luxembourg	6	0	0	6	135	195	−60	0	

Source: EHF
Rules for classification: 1) points; 2) head-to-head points; 3) head-to-head goal difference; 4) head-to-head number of goals scored; 5) goal difference.

12 October 2022; 19:00	North Macedonia	38–24	Luxembourg	Boris Trajkovski Sports Center, Skopje; Attendance: 2,300; Referees: Budzák, Záhradník (SVK)
12 October 2022; 19:00	three players 5	(18–7)	Werdel 5	Boris Trajkovski Sports Center, Skopje; Attendance: 2,300; Referees: Budzák, Záhradník (SVK)
12 October 2022; 19:00	2× (suspension) 1× (red card)	Report	1× (yellow card) 3× (suspension)	Boris Trajkovski Sports Center, Skopje; Attendance: 2,300; Referees: Budzák, Záhradník (SVK)

13 October 2022; 20:30	Portugal	44–27	Turkey	Centro de Desportos e Congressos, Matosinhos; Attendance: 1,600; Referees: Pétursson, Þrastarson (ISL)
13 October 2022; 20:30	F. Costa 7	(24–12)	Yağmuroğlu 6	Centro de Desportos e Congressos, Matosinhos; Attendance: 1,600; Referees: Pétursson, Þrastarson (ISL)
13 October 2022; 20:30	1× (yellow card) 1× (suspension)	Report	5× (suspension)	Centro de Desportos e Congressos, Matosinhos; Attendance: 1,600; Referees: Pétursson, Þrastarson (ISL)

16 October 2022; 16:00	Luxembourg	21–32	Portugal	d'Coque, Luxembourg City; Attendance: 1,121; Referees: Vujačić, Kažanegra (MNE)
16 October 2022; 16:00	Hoffmann 5	(5–14)	Fernandes, Iturriza 5	d'Coque, Luxembourg City; Attendance: 1,121; Referees: Vujačić, Kažanegra (MNE)
16 October 2022; 16:00	1× (yellow card) 2× (suspension)	Report	1× (yellow card) 2× (suspension)	d'Coque, Luxembourg City; Attendance: 1,121; Referees: Vujačić, Kažanegra (MNE)

16 October 2022; 16:00	Turkey	27–36	North Macedonia	Nur Tatar Spor Salonu, Van; Attendance: 3,580; Referees: Brkic, Jusufhodzic (AUT)
16 October 2022; 16:00	Karakoç 8	(8–17)	Taleski 7	Nur Tatar Spor Salonu, Van; Attendance: 3,580; Referees: Brkic, Jusufhodzic (AUT)
16 October 2022; 16:00	1× (yellow card) 4× (suspension)	Report	6× (suspension)	Nur Tatar Spor Salonu, Van; Attendance: 3,580; Referees: Brkic, Jusufhodzic (AUT)

8 March 2023; 19:00	Luxembourg	29–30	Turkey	d'Coque, Luxembourg City; Attendance: 524; Referees: Ivanauskas, Jencevicius (LTU)
8 March 2023; 19:00	Tironzelli 6	(10–14)	Hacıoğlu 6	d'Coque, Luxembourg City; Attendance: 524; Referees: Ivanauskas, Jencevicius (LTU)
8 March 2023; 19:00	1× (yellow card) 4× (suspension)	Report	2× (yellow card) 5× (suspension)	d'Coque, Luxembourg City; Attendance: 524; Referees: Ivanauskas, Jencevicius (LTU)

9 March 2023; 19:00	North Macedonia	23–29	Portugal	Boris Trajkovski Sports Center, Skopje; Attendance: 5,000; Referees: Boričić, Marković (SRB)
9 March 2023; 19:00	Kuzmanovski, Serafimov 5	(11–14)	Areia 10	Boris Trajkovski Sports Center, Skopje; Attendance: 5,000; Referees: Boričić, Marković (SRB)
9 March 2023; 19:00	1× (yellow card) 3× (suspension)	Report	1× (yellow card) 5× (suspension)	Boris Trajkovski Sports Center, Skopje; Attendance: 5,000; Referees: Boričić, Marković (SRB)

12 March 2023; 15:00	Turkey	31–20	Luxembourg	19 Mayis Spor Salonu, Konya; Attendance: 1,500; Referees: Sirbu, Serdiuc (MDA)
12 March 2023; 15:00	Yağmuroğlu 7	(17–8)	Ilic 5	19 Mayis Spor Salonu, Konya; Attendance: 1,500; Referees: Sirbu, Serdiuc (MDA)
12 March 2023; 15:00	1× (yellow card) 6× (suspension)	Report	2× (suspension)	19 Mayis Spor Salonu, Konya; Attendance: 1,500; Referees: Sirbu, Serdiuc (MDA)

12 March 2023; 18:30	Portugal	32–27	North Macedonia	Centro de Desportos e Congressos, Matosinhos; Attendance: 3,525; Referees: Madsen, Mortensen (DEN)
12 March 2023; 18:30	five players 4	(15–11)	Kuzmanovski 10	Centro de Desportos e Congressos, Matosinhos; Attendance: 3,525; Referees: Madsen, Mortensen (DEN)
12 March 2023; 18:30	1× (yellow card) 3× (suspension)	Report	1× (yellow card) 2× (suspension)	Centro de Desportos e Congressos, Matosinhos; Attendance: 3,525; Referees: Madsen, Mortensen (DEN)

26 April 2023; 17:00	Turkey	35–37	Portugal	THF Sport Hall, Ankara; Attendance: 2,000; Referees: Weijmans, Wolbertus (NED)
26 April 2023; 17:00	Döne 6	(14–19)	Martins 8	THF Sport Hall, Ankara; Attendance: 2,000; Referees: Weijmans, Wolbertus (NED)
26 April 2023; 17:00	1× (yellow card) 6× (suspension) 1× (red card)	Report	2× (suspension)	THF Sport Hall, Ankara; Attendance: 2,000; Referees: Weijmans, Wolbertus (NED)

26 April 2023; 20:15	Luxembourg	23–28	North Macedonia	d'Coque, Luxembourg City; Attendance: 700; Referees: Em. Aghakishi, Er. Aghakishi (AZE)
26 April 2023; 20:15	Kaysen 10	(12–14)	Taleski 8	d'Coque, Luxembourg City; Attendance: 700; Referees: Em. Aghakishi, Er. Aghakishi (AZE)
26 April 2023; 20:15	1× (yellow card) 4× (suspension)	Report	1× (yellow card) 5× (suspension)	d'Coque, Luxembourg City; Attendance: 700; Referees: Em. Aghakishi, Er. Aghakishi (AZE)

30 April 2023; 18:00	Portugal	36–18	Luxembourg	Pavilhão Multidesportos Dr. Mário Mexia, Coimbra; Attendance: 1,600; Referees: Capoccia, Jucker (SUI)
30 April 2023; 18:00	four players 5	(18–8)	Hoffmann, Weyer 5	Pavilhão Multidesportos Dr. Mário Mexia, Coimbra; Attendance: 1,600; Referees: Capoccia, Jucker (SUI)
30 April 2023; 18:00	1× (yellow card) 3× (suspension)	Report	3× (suspension)	Pavilhão Multidesportos Dr. Mário Mexia, Coimbra; Attendance: 1,600; Referees: Capoccia, Jucker (SUI)

30 April 2023; 18:00	North Macedonia	30–27	Turkey	Boris Trajkovski Sports Center, Skopje; Attendance: 4,500; Referees: Lindenbaum, Laron (ISR)
30 April 2023; 18:00	Mitev, Peševski 5	(15–15)	Pehlivan, Tınkır 5	Boris Trajkovski Sports Center, Skopje; Attendance: 4,500; Referees: Lindenbaum, Laron (ISR)
30 April 2023; 18:00	1× (yellow card) 2× (suspension)	Report	1× (yellow card) 3× (suspension)	Boris Trajkovski Sports Center, Skopje; Attendance: 4,500; Referees: Lindenbaum, Laron (ISR)

==== Group 2 ====
Pos	Team	Pld	W	D	L	GF	GA	GD	Pts	Qualification
1	Norway	6	5	0	1	197	144	+53	10 (Note: Norway 59–50 Serbia)	Final tournament
2	Serbia	6	5	0	1	178	159	+19	10	Final tournament
3	Slovakia	6	1	0	5	155	190	−35	2 (Note: Slovakia 59–55 Finland)	
4	Finland	6	1	0	5	153	190	−37	2	

Source: EHF
Rules for classification: 1) points; 2) head-to-head points; 3) head-to-head goal difference; 4) head-to-head number of goals scored; 5) goal difference.
Notes:

12 October 2022; 18:00	Serbia	34–24	Finland	SPC Vojvodina, Novi Sad; Attendance: 4,000; Referees: Carmaux, Mursch (FRA)
12 October 2022; 18:00	Pechmalbec 6	(19–11)	M. Granlund 10	SPC Vojvodina, Novi Sad; Attendance: 4,000; Referees: Carmaux, Mursch (FRA)
12 October 2022; 18:00	3× (suspension)	Report	1× (yellow card) 1× (suspension)	SPC Vojvodina, Novi Sad; Attendance: 4,000; Referees: Carmaux, Mursch (FRA)

13 October 2022; 18:15	Norway	38–26	Slovakia	Jotron Arena Larvik, Larvik; Attendance: 3,200; Referees: Yovchev, Yonchev (BUL)
13 October 2022; 18:15	Barthold 9	(19–11)	three players 4	Jotron Arena Larvik, Larvik; Attendance: 3,200; Referees: Yovchev, Yonchev (BUL)
13 October 2022; 18:15	1× (yellow card) 4× (suspension)	Report	1× (yellow card) 2× (suspension)	Jotron Arena Larvik, Larvik; Attendance: 3,200; Referees: Yovchev, Yonchev (BUL)

16 October 2022; 15:00	Finland	22–35	Norway	Energia Areena, Vantaa; Attendance: 1,200; Referees: Canbro, Kliko (SWE)
16 October 2022; 15:00	Helander, Karlsson 6	(14–19)	Barthold 7	Energia Areena, Vantaa; Attendance: 1,200; Referees: Canbro, Kliko (SWE)
16 October 2022; 15:00	3× (suspension)	Report	3× (suspension)	Energia Areena, Vantaa; Attendance: 1,200; Referees: Canbro, Kliko (SWE)

16 October 2022; 18:00	Slovakia	21–27	Serbia	City Hall Prešov, Prešov; Attendance: 2,000; Referees: Leszczyński, Piechota (POL)
16 October 2022; 18:00	Potisk 6	(12–16)	Kukić, Radivojević 7	City Hall Prešov, Prešov; Attendance: 2,000; Referees: Leszczyński, Piechota (POL)
16 October 2022; 18:00	4× (suspension)	Report	3× (suspension)	City Hall Prešov, Prešov; Attendance: 2,000; Referees: Leszczyński, Piechota (POL)

9 March 2023; 18:00	Serbia	25–24	Norway	SPC Vojvodina, Novi Sad; Attendance: 6,700; Referees: Horváth, Marton (HUN)
9 March 2023; 18:00	Pechmalbec, Radivojević 5	(12–14)	Abelvik Rød 6	SPC Vojvodina, Novi Sad; Attendance: 6,700; Referees: Horváth, Marton (HUN)
9 March 2023; 18:00	2× (yellow card) 3× (suspension)	Report	1× (yellow card) 3× (suspension)	SPC Vojvodina, Novi Sad; Attendance: 6,700; Referees: Horváth, Marton (HUN)

9 March 2023; 18:00	Finland	30–27	Slovakia	Energia Areena, Vantaa; Attendance: 750; Referees: Stark, Ştefan (ROU)
9 March 2023; 18:00	M. Granlund 8	(11–13)	Potisk 6	Energia Areena, Vantaa; Attendance: 750; Referees: Stark, Ştefan (ROU)
9 March 2023; 18:00	1× (yellow card) 2× (suspension)	Report	3× (suspension)	Energia Areena, Vantaa; Attendance: 750; Referees: Stark, Ştefan (ROU)

12 March 2023; 16:00	Slovakia	32–25	Finland	Sportová Hala Na Zábraní, Hlohovec; Attendance: 2,000; Referees: Ivanović, Vujisić (MNE)
12 March 2023; 16:00	Hlinka, Péchy 5	(13–14)	M. Granlund 7	Sportová Hala Na Zábraní, Hlohovec; Attendance: 2,000; Referees: Ivanović, Vujisić (MNE)
12 March 2023; 16:00	3× (suspension)	Report	1× (yellow card) 5× (suspension)	Sportová Hala Na Zábraní, Hlohovec; Attendance: 2,000; Referees: Ivanović, Vujisić (MNE)

12 March 2023; 16:45	Norway	35–25	Serbia	Åsane Arena, Bergen; Attendance: 2,200; Referees: Álvarez, Bustamante (ESP)
12 March 2023; 16:45	Sagosen 12	(17–12)	Marsenić 5	Åsane Arena, Bergen; Attendance: 2,200; Referees: Álvarez, Bustamante (ESP)
12 March 2023; 16:45	1× (yellow card) 1× (suspension)	Report	1× (yellow card) 3× (suspension)	Åsane Arena, Bergen; Attendance: 2,200; Referees: Álvarez, Bustamante (ESP)

26 April 2023; 18:00	Slovakia	23–33	Norway	Sportová Hala Na Zábraní, Hlohovec; Attendance: 1,950; Referees: Hofer, Schmidhuber (AUT)
26 April 2023; 18:00	Urban 7	(12–17)	Blonz 6	Sportová Hala Na Zábraní, Hlohovec; Attendance: 1,950; Referees: Hofer, Schmidhuber (AUT)
26 April 2023; 18:00	1× (yellow card) 2× (suspension)	Report	1× (yellow card) 4× (suspension)	Sportová Hala Na Zábraní, Hlohovec; Attendance: 1,950; Referees: Hofer, Schmidhuber (AUT)

27 April 2023; 18:00	Finland	29–30	Serbia	Energia Areena, Vantaa; Attendance: 600; Referees: Fukala, Mohyla (CZE)
27 April 2023; 18:00	M. Granlund 9	(17–14)	N. Ilić 8	Energia Areena, Vantaa; Attendance: 600; Referees: Fukala, Mohyla (CZE)
27 April 2023; 18:00	6× (suspension) 1× (red card)	Report	1× (yellow card) 1× (suspension)	Energia Areena, Vantaa; Attendance: 600; Referees: Fukala, Mohyla (CZE)

30 April 2023; 18:00	Norway	32–23	Finland	Gjøvik Olympic Cavern Hall, Gjøvik; Attendance: 4,468; Referees: Klompers, Stobbe (NED)
30 April 2023; 18:00	Abelvik Rød, Lien 5	(15–12)	M. Granlund, Hjálmarsson 6	Gjøvik Olympic Cavern Hall, Gjøvik; Attendance: 4,468; Referees: Klompers, Stobbe (NED)
30 April 2023; 18:00	2× (suspension)	Report	1× (yellow card) 3× (suspension)	Gjøvik Olympic Cavern Hall, Gjøvik; Attendance: 4,468; Referees: Klompers, Stobbe (NED)

30 April 2023; 18:00	Serbia	37–26	Slovakia	SPC Vojvodina, Novi Sad; Attendance: 2,500; Referees: Čerņavskis, Bogdanovs (LAT)
30 April 2023; 18:00	three players 6	(19–13)	Urban 7	SPC Vojvodina, Novi Sad; Attendance: 2,500; Referees: Čerņavskis, Bogdanovs (LAT)
30 April 2023; 18:00	2× (suspension)	Report	2× (suspension)	SPC Vojvodina, Novi Sad; Attendance: 2,500; Referees: Čerņavskis, Bogdanovs (LAT)

==== Group 3 ====
Pos	Team	Pld	W	D	L	GF	GA	GD	Pts	Qualification
1	Iceland	6	5	0	1	185	136	+49	10 (Note: Iceland 45–41 Czech Republic)	Final tournament
2	Czech Republic	6	5	0	1	160	141	+19	10	Final tournament
3	Estonia	6	1	0	5	158	187	−29	2 (Note: Estonia 57–57 Israel)	
4	Israel	6	1	0	5	147	186	−39	2	

Source: EHF
Rules for classification: 1) points; 2) head-to-head points; 3) head-to-head goal difference; 4) head-to-head number of goals scored; 5) goal difference.
Notes:

12 October 2022; 18:10	Czech Republic	31–23	Estonia	RT Torax Arena, Ostrava; Attendance: 3,500; Referees: Šniurevičius, Grigalionis (LTU)
12 October 2022; 18:10	Klíma 6	(17–13)	Löpp, Rooba 4	RT Torax Arena, Ostrava; Attendance: 3,500; Referees: Šniurevičius, Grigalionis (LTU)
12 October 2022; 18:10	1× (yellow card) 4× (suspension)	Report	1× (yellow card) 6× (suspension)	RT Torax Arena, Ostrava; Attendance: 3,500; Referees: Šniurevičius, Grigalionis (LTU)

12 October 2022; 21:45	Iceland	36–21	Israel	Íþróttamiðstöð Hauka, Hafnarfjörður; Attendance: 1,150; Referees: Rauchs, Linster (LUX)
12 October 2022; 21:45	K. Kristjánsson 7	(16–10)	Lumbroso 5	Íþróttamiðstöð Hauka, Hafnarfjörður; Attendance: 1,150; Referees: Rauchs, Linster (LUX)
12 October 2022; 21:45	3× (suspension)	Report	6× (suspension)	Íþróttamiðstöð Hauka, Hafnarfjörður; Attendance: 1,150; Referees: Rauchs, Linster (LUX)

15 October 2022; 18:10	Estonia	25–37	Iceland	Kalev Sports Hall, Tallinn; Attendance: 500; Referees: Christiansen, Hansen (DEN)
15 October 2022; 18:10	Toom 8	(13–20)	Elísson 12	Kalev Sports Hall, Tallinn; Attendance: 500; Referees: Christiansen, Hansen (DEN)
15 October 2022; 18:10	5× (suspension)	Report	2× (suspension)	Kalev Sports Hall, Tallinn; Attendance: 500; Referees: Christiansen, Hansen (DEN)

16 October 2022; 14:00	Israel	19–29	Czech Republic	Drive in Arena, Tel Aviv; Attendance: 1,095; Referees: I. Covalciuc, A. Covalciuc (MDA)
16 October 2022; 14:00	Lumbroso 6	(10–16)	Hrstka, Klíma 6	Drive in Arena, Tel Aviv; Attendance: 1,095; Referees: I. Covalciuc, A. Covalciuc (MDA)
16 October 2022; 14:00	4× (suspension)	Report	4× (suspension)	Drive in Arena, Tel Aviv; Attendance: 1,095; Referees: I. Covalciuc, A. Covalciuc (MDA)

8 March 2023; 20:15	Czech Republic	22–17	Iceland	Sportovní hala Vodova, Brno; Attendance: 2,800; Referees: Gubica, Milošević (CRO)
8 March 2023; 20:15	three players 4	(12–10)	V. Kristjánsson 7	Sportovní hala Vodova, Brno; Attendance: 2,800; Referees: Gubica, Milošević (CRO)
8 March 2023; 20:15	2× (yellow card) 5× (suspension) 1× (red card)	Report	3× (suspension)	Sportovní hala Vodova, Brno; Attendance: 2,800; Referees: Gubica, Milošević (CRO)

9 March 2023; 18:00	Estonia	30–28	Israel	Kalev Sports Hall, Tallinn; Attendance: 900; Referees: Mikelič, Paradina (CRO)
9 March 2023; 18:00	Toom 11	(16–12)	Dayan 9	Kalev Sports Hall, Tallinn; Attendance: 900; Referees: Mikelič, Paradina (CRO)
9 March 2023; 18:00	2× (yellow card) 4× (suspension)	Report	1× (yellow card)	Kalev Sports Hall, Tallinn; Attendance: 900; Referees: Mikelič, Paradina (CRO)

12 March 2023; 17:00	Iceland	28–19	Czech Republic	Laugardalshöll, Reykjavík; Attendance: 2,500; Referees: Bíró, Kiss (HUN)
12 March 2023; 17:00	G. Kristjánsson, V. Kristjánsson 6	(15–12)	Klíma 6	Laugardalshöll, Reykjavík; Attendance: 2,500; Referees: Bíró, Kiss (HUN)
12 March 2023; 17:00	2× (suspension)	Report	4× (suspension)	Laugardalshöll, Reykjavík; Attendance: 2,500; Referees: Bíró, Kiss (HUN)

12 March 2023; 17:00	Israel	29–27	Estonia	Drive in Arena, Tel Aviv; Attendance: 600; Referees: Bozhinovski, Nachevski (MKD)
12 March 2023; 17:00	Cohen, Mosindi 6	(15–13)	Patrail 6	Drive in Arena, Tel Aviv; Attendance: 600; Referees: Bozhinovski, Nachevski (MKD)
12 March 2023; 17:00	6× (suspension)	Report	5× (suspension)	Drive in Arena, Tel Aviv; Attendance: 600; Referees: Bozhinovski, Nachevski (MKD)

27 April 2023; 17:00	Estonia	30–32	Czech Republic	Kalev Sports Hall, Tallinn; Attendance: 400; Referees: Santos, Fonseca (POR)
27 April 2023; 17:00	Lees, Löpp 5	(14–18)	Hrstka 8	Kalev Sports Hall, Tallinn; Attendance: 400; Referees: Santos, Fonseca (POR)
27 April 2023; 17:00	1× (yellow card) 6× (suspension)	Report	2× (yellow card) 6× (suspension)	Kalev Sports Hall, Tallinn; Attendance: 400; Referees: Santos, Fonseca (POR)

27 April 2023; 18:00	Israel	26–37	Iceland	Drive in Arena, Tel Aviv; Attendance: 1,000; Referees: Jović, Arnautović (BIH)
27 April 2023; 18:00	Natsia 7	(11–19)	K. Kristjánsson 8	Drive in Arena, Tel Aviv; Attendance: 1,000; Referees: Jović, Arnautović (BIH)
27 April 2023; 18:00	1× (yellow card) 4× (suspension)	Report	2× (suspension)	Drive in Arena, Tel Aviv; Attendance: 1,000; Referees: Jović, Arnautović (BIH)

30 April 2023; 18:00	Czech Republic	27–24	Israel	Hala Polárka, Frýdek-Místek; Attendance: 2,600; Referees: Vešović, Mitrović (MNE)
30 April 2023; 18:00	Klíma 7	(15–13)	Turkenitz 6	Hala Polárka, Frýdek-Místek; Attendance: 2,600; Referees: Vešović, Mitrović (MNE)
30 April 2023; 18:00	6× (suspension)	Report	4× (suspension)	Hala Polárka, Frýdek-Místek; Attendance: 2,600; Referees: Vešović, Mitrović (MNE)

30 April 2023; 18:00	Iceland	30–23	Estonia	Laugardalshöll, Reykjavík; Attendance: 2,500; Referees: Antić, Jakovljević (SRB)
30 April 2023; 18:00	Elísson 8	(17–10)	Mamporia 5	Laugardalshöll, Reykjavík; Attendance: 2,500; Referees: Antić, Jakovljević (SRB)
30 April 2023; 18:00	1× (yellow card) 1× (suspension)	Report	1× (yellow card) 1× (suspension)	Laugardalshöll, Reykjavík; Attendance: 2,500; Referees: Antić, Jakovljević (SRB)

==== Group 4 ====
Pos	Team	Pld	W	D	L	GF	GA	GD	Pts	Qualification
1	Austria	6	6	0	0	208	182	+26	12	Final tournament
2	Romania	6	2	0	4	173	173	0	4 (Note: HTH: Romania 4 Pts, +9 GD; Faroe Islands 4 Pts, −3 GD; Ukraine 4 Pts, −6 GD)	Final tournament
3	Faroe Islands	6	2	0	4	164	174	−10	4	Final tournament
4	Ukraine	6	2	0	4	171	187	−16	4	

Source: EHF
Rules for classification: 1) points; 2) head-to-head points; 3) head-to-head goal difference; 4) head-to-head number of goals scored; 5) goal difference.
Notes:

12 October 2022; 20:00	Ukraine	29–25	Faroe Islands	F.a.n. Frankenstolz Arena, Aschaffenburg, Germany (Note: Due to the Russian invasion of Ukraine, the Ukrainian team plays their home matches at neutral venues.); Attendance: 1,756; Referees: Baumgart, Wild (GER)
12 October 2022; 20:00	Turchenko 9	(18–14)	Mikkelsen 5	F.a.n. Frankenstolz Arena, Aschaffenburg, Germany; Attendance: 1,756; Referees: Baumgart, Wild (GER)
12 October 2022; 20:00	1× (yellow card) 3× (suspension)	Report	1× (yellow card) 3× (suspension)	F.a.n. Frankenstolz Arena, Aschaffenburg, Germany; Attendance: 1,756; Referees: Baumgart, Wild (GER)

13 October 2022; 18:00	Austria	36–32	Romania	Raiffeisen Sportpark, Graz; Attendance: 2,200; Referees: D. Martins, R. Martins (POR)
13 October 2022; 18:00	Weber 12	(18–11)	Negru 11	Raiffeisen Sportpark, Graz; Attendance: 2,200; Referees: D. Martins, R. Martins (POR)
13 October 2022; 18:00	2× (suspension)	Report	3× (suspension)	Raiffeisen Sportpark, Graz; Attendance: 2,200; Referees: D. Martins, R. Martins (POR)

16 October 2022; 16:30	Romania	34–26	Ukraine	Dinamo Polyvalent Hall, Bucharest; Attendance: 2,200; Referees: A. Konjičanin, D. Konjičanin (BIH)
16 October 2022; 16:30	Grigoraș 9	(18–14)	Turchenko 7	Dinamo Polyvalent Hall, Bucharest; Attendance: 2,200; Referees: A. Konjičanin, D. Konjičanin (BIH)
16 October 2022; 16:30	3× (suspension)	Report	3× (suspension)	Dinamo Polyvalent Hall, Bucharest; Attendance: 2,200; Referees: A. Konjičanin, D. Konjičanin (BIH)

16 October 2022; 19:00	Faroe Islands	28–30	Austria	Høllin á Hálsi, Tórshavn; Attendance: 1,500; Referees: Jørum, Kleven (NOR)
16 October 2022; 19:00	Ó. Mittún 7	(14–14)	Hutecek 8	Høllin á Hálsi, Tórshavn; Attendance: 1,500; Referees: Jørum, Kleven (NOR)
16 October 2022; 19:00	2× (suspension)	Report	7× (suspension) 1× (red card)	Høllin á Hálsi, Tórshavn; Attendance: 1,500; Referees: Jørum, Kleven (NOR)

8 March 2023; 20:00	Faroe Islands	28–26	Romania	Høllin á Hálsi, Tórshavn; Attendance: 1,700; Referees: Lah, Sok (SLO)
8 March 2023; 20:00	West Av Teigum 11	(15–9)	Tarita 6	Høllin á Hálsi, Tórshavn; Attendance: 1,700; Referees: Lah, Sok (SLO)
8 March 2023; 20:00	1× (yellow card) 4× (suspension)	Report	1× (yellow card) 5× (suspension)	Høllin á Hálsi, Tórshavn; Attendance: 1,700; Referees: Lah, Sok (SLO)

9 March 2023; 19:00	Ukraine	31–38	Austria	HUK-Coburg Arena, Coburg, Germany; Attendance: 2,272; Referees: Nikolov, Nachevski (MKD)
9 March 2023; 19:00	Akimenko 10	(13–18)	Wagner 8	HUK-Coburg Arena, Coburg, Germany; Attendance: 2,272; Referees: Nikolov, Nachevski (MKD)
9 March 2023; 19:00	1× (yellow card) 5× (suspension)	Report	1× (yellow card) 3× (suspension)	HUK-Coburg Arena, Coburg, Germany; Attendance: 2,272; Referees: Nikolov, Nachevski (MKD)

11 March 2023; 16:00	Romania	25–17	Faroe Islands	Dinamo Polyvalent Hall, Bucharest; Attendance: 1,935; Referees: Sekulić, Jovandić (SRB)
11 March 2023; 16:00	three players 4	(14–10)	West Av Teigum 4	Dinamo Polyvalent Hall, Bucharest; Attendance: 1,935; Referees: Sekulić, Jovandić (SRB)
11 March 2023; 16:00	5× (suspension)	Report	1× (yellow card) 3× (suspension)	Dinamo Polyvalent Hall, Bucharest; Attendance: 1,935; Referees: Sekulić, Jovandić (SRB)

11 March 2023; 20:25	Austria	31–28	Ukraine	SMS Kleinmünchen, Linz; Attendance: 1,000; Referees: Jurinović, Mrvica (CRO)
11 March 2023; 20:25	Bilyk 6	(11–14)	Turchenko 8	SMS Kleinmünchen, Linz; Attendance: 1,000; Referees: Jurinović, Mrvica (CRO)
11 March 2023; 20:25	2× (suspension)	Report	4× (suspension) 1× (red card)	SMS Kleinmünchen, Linz; Attendance: 1,000; Referees: Jurinović, Mrvica (CRO)

26 April 2023; 16:30	Romania	30–35	Austria	Dinamo Polyvalent Hall, Bucharest; Attendance: 1,200; Referees: Erdoğan, Özdeniz (TUR)
26 April 2023; 16:30	Nistor 7	(17–19)	Bilyk 7	Dinamo Polyvalent Hall, Bucharest; Attendance: 1,200; Referees: Erdoğan, Özdeniz (TUR)
26 April 2023; 16:30	1× (yellow card) 2× (suspension)	Report	2× (suspension)	Dinamo Polyvalent Hall, Bucharest; Attendance: 1,200; Referees: Erdoğan, Özdeniz (TUR)

26 April 2023; 20:00	Faroe Islands	33–26	Ukraine	Høllin á Hálsi, Tórshavn; Attendance: 1,700; Referees: K. Gasmi, R. Gasmi (FRA)
26 April 2023; 20:00	Ellefsen á Skipagøtu 13	(17–12)	Horiha 10	Høllin á Hálsi, Tórshavn; Attendance: 1,700; Referees: K. Gasmi, R. Gasmi (FRA)
26 April 2023; 20:00	2× (suspension)	Report	1× (yellow card) 5× (suspension)	Høllin á Hálsi, Tórshavn; Attendance: 1,700; Referees: K. Gasmi, R. Gasmi (FRA)

30 April 2023; 18:00	Austria	38–33	Faroe Islands	Sporthalle Rieden-Vorkloster, Bregenz; Attendance: 1,400; Referees: Ivanović, Vujisić (MNE)
30 April 2023; 18:00	Weber 7	(24–16)	West Av Teigum 10	Sporthalle Rieden-Vorkloster, Bregenz; Attendance: 1,400; Referees: Ivanović, Vujisić (MNE)
30 April 2023; 18:00	4× (suspension)	Report	3× (suspension)	Sporthalle Rieden-Vorkloster, Bregenz; Attendance: 1,400; Referees: Ivanović, Vujisić (MNE)

30 April 2023; 18:00	Ukraine	31–26	Romania	Schwalbe-Arena, Gummersbach, Germany; Attendance: 1,872; Referees: Kurtagic, Wetterwik (SWE)
30 April 2023; 18:00	Akimenko, Denysov 6	(12–13)	Negru, Stanciuc 6	Schwalbe-Arena, Gummersbach, Germany; Attendance: 1,872; Referees: Kurtagic, Wetterwik (SWE)
30 April 2023; 18:00	1× (yellow card) 7× (suspension)	Report	1× (yellow card) 6× (suspension) 2× (red card)	Schwalbe-Arena, Gummersbach, Germany; Attendance: 1,872; Referees: Kurtagic, Wetterwik (SWE)

==== Group 5 ====
Pos	Team	Pld	W	D	L	GF	GA	GD	Pts	Qualification
1	Netherlands	6	4	1	1	170	157	+13	9 (Note: HTH: Netherlands 3 pts; Croatia 1 pt)	Final tournament
2	Croatia	6	4	1	1	180	164	+16	9	Final tournament
3	Greece	6	3	0	3	161	172	−11	6	Final tournament
4	Belgium	6	0	0	6	151	169	−18	0	

Source: EHF
Rules for classification: 1) points; 2) head-to-head points; 3) head-to-head goal difference; 4) head-to-head number of goals scored; 5) goal difference.
Notes:

12 October 2022; 18:00	Croatia	33–25	Greece	Varaždin Arena, Varaždin; Attendance: 3,100; Referees: Andorka, Hucker (HUN)
12 October 2022; 18:00	Glavaš 6	(18–13)	Tziras 5	Varaždin Arena, Varaždin; Attendance: 3,100; Referees: Andorka, Hucker (HUN)
12 October 2022; 18:00	2× (yellow card) 5× (suspension)	Report	3× (suspension)	Varaždin Arena, Varaždin; Attendance: 3,100; Referees: Andorka, Hucker (HUN)

13 October 2022; 20:00	Netherlands	25–24	Belgium	Maaspoort, 's-Hertogenbosch; Attendance: 1,500; Referees: E. Vitaku, A. Vitaku (KOS)
13 October 2022; 20:00	K. Smits 12	(12–9)	Qerimi, Spooren 6	Maaspoort, 's-Hertogenbosch; Attendance: 1,500; Referees: E. Vitaku, A. Vitaku (KOS)
13 October 2022; 20:00	1× (yellow card) 3× (suspension)	Report	1× (yellow card) 3× (suspension)	Maaspoort, 's-Hertogenbosch; Attendance: 1,500; Referees: E. Vitaku, A. Vitaku (KOS)

16 October 2022; 13:45	Belgium	27–30	Croatia	Stedelijke sporthal Alverberg, Hasselt; Attendance: 1,970; Referees: R. Thiyagarajah, S. Thiyagarajah (GER)
16 October 2022; 13:45	Gillé, Vancosen 6	(13–15)	three players 6	Stedelijke sporthal Alverberg, Hasselt; Attendance: 1,970; Referees: R. Thiyagarajah, S. Thiyagarajah (GER)
16 October 2022; 13:45	2× (suspension)	Report	2× (suspension)	Stedelijke sporthal Alverberg, Hasselt; Attendance: 1,970; Referees: R. Thiyagarajah, S. Thiyagarajah (GER)

16 October 2022; 17:00	Greece	32–28	Netherlands	Tasos Kampouris Kanithou Indoor Hall, Chalcis; Attendance: 1,200; Referees: Boričić, Marković (SRB)
16 October 2022; 17:00	four players 5	(15–12)	K. Smits 7	Tasos Kampouris Kanithou Indoor Hall, Chalcis; Attendance: 1,200; Referees: Boričić, Marković (SRB)
16 October 2022; 17:00	1× (yellow card) 5× (suspension)	Report	2× (yellow card) 6× (suspension)	Tasos Kampouris Kanithou Indoor Hall, Chalcis; Attendance: 1,200; Referees: Boričić, Marković (SRB)

8 March 2023; 19:30	Netherlands	32–27	Croatia	Indoor-Sportcentrum Eindhoven, Eindhoven; Attendance: 2,000; Referees: Mažeika, Gatelis (LTU)
8 March 2023; 19:30	K. Smits 8	(15–13)	three players 4	Indoor-Sportcentrum Eindhoven, Eindhoven; Attendance: 2,000; Referees: Mažeika, Gatelis (LTU)
8 March 2023; 19:30	1× (yellow card) 4× (suspension)	Report	2× (yellow card) 3× (suspension)	Indoor-Sportcentrum Eindhoven, Eindhoven; Attendance: 2,000; Referees: Mažeika, Gatelis (LTU)

8 March 2023; 20:10	Belgium	24–26	Greece	Stedelijke sporthal Alverberg, Hasselt; Attendance: 1,868; Referees: Caçador, Nicolau (POR)
8 March 2023; 20:10	De Beule 7	(10–13)	three players 4	Stedelijke sporthal Alverberg, Hasselt; Attendance: 1,868; Referees: Caçador, Nicolau (POR)
8 March 2023; 20:10	6× (suspension) 1× (red card)	Report	1× (yellow card) 6× (suspension)	Stedelijke sporthal Alverberg, Hasselt; Attendance: 1,868; Referees: Caçador, Nicolau (POR)

12 March 2023; 17:00	Greece	26–24	Belgium	Tasos Kampouris Kanithou Indoor Hall, Chalcis; Attendance: 1,200; Referees: Brkic, Jusufhodzic (AUT)
12 March 2023; 17:00	Mallios, Toskas 6	(13–12)	Colman 6	Tasos Kampouris Kanithou Indoor Hall, Chalcis; Attendance: 1,200; Referees: Brkic, Jusufhodzic (AUT)
12 March 2023; 17:00	2× (yellow card) 3× (suspension)	Report	1× (yellow card) 3× (suspension)	Tasos Kampouris Kanithou Indoor Hall, Chalcis; Attendance: 1,200; Referees: Brkic, Jusufhodzic (AUT)

12 March 2023; 20:15	Croatia	25–25	Netherlands	Gradski vrt Hall, Osijek; Attendance: 3,200; Referees: Brunner, Salah (SUI)
12 March 2023; 20:15	Maraš 5	(14–15)	Baijens 6	Gradski vrt Hall, Osijek; Attendance: 3,200; Referees: Brunner, Salah (SUI)
12 March 2023; 20:15	5× (suspension)	Report	1× (yellow card) 4× (suspension)	Gradski vrt Hall, Osijek; Attendance: 3,200; Referees: Brunner, Salah (SUI)

26 April 2023; 17:00	Greece	26–31	Croatia	Tasos Kampouris Kanithou Indoor Hall, Chalcis; Attendance: 1,204; Referees: Horáček, Novotný (CZE)
26 April 2023; 17:00	Savvas 6	(10–10)	Cindrić 10	Tasos Kampouris Kanithou Indoor Hall, Chalcis; Attendance: 1,204; Referees: Horáček, Novotný (CZE)
26 April 2023; 17:00	2× (yellow card) 5× (suspension)	Report	1× (yellow card) 4× (suspension)	Tasos Kampouris Kanithou Indoor Hall, Chalcis; Attendance: 1,204; Referees: Horáček, Novotný (CZE)

26 April 2023; 20:10	Belgium	23–28	Netherlands	Stedelijke sporthal Alverberg, Hasselt; Attendance: 1,500; Referees: Bíró, Kiss (HUN)
26 April 2023; 20:10	Robyns 6	(10–17)	Ten Velde 10	Stedelijke sporthal Alverberg, Hasselt; Attendance: 1,500; Referees: Bíró, Kiss (HUN)
26 April 2023; 20:10	3× (suspension)	Report	3× (suspension)	Stedelijke sporthal Alverberg, Hasselt; Attendance: 1,500; Referees: Bíró, Kiss (HUN)

30 April 2023; 18:00	Croatia	34–29	Belgium	Centar Zamet, Rijeka; Attendance: 2,800; Referees: Pirvu, Potîrniche (ROU)
30 April 2023; 18:00	Cindrić 9	(16–16)	five players 5	Centar Zamet, Rijeka; Attendance: 2,800; Referees: Pirvu, Potîrniche (ROU)
30 April 2023; 18:00	2× (yellow card) 4× (suspension)	Report	1× (yellow card) 4× (suspension)	Centar Zamet, Rijeka; Attendance: 2,800; Referees: Pirvu, Potîrniche (ROU)

30 April 2023; 18:00	Netherlands	32–26	Greece	Topsportcentrum, Almere; Attendance: 2,200; Referees: Baumgart, Wild (GER)
30 April 2023; 18:00	K. Smits 9	(17–11)	Savvas 7	Topsportcentrum, Almere; Attendance: 2,200; Referees: Baumgart, Wild (GER)
30 April 2023; 18:00	1× (yellow card) 6× (suspension) 1× (red card)	Report	2× (yellow card) 4× (suspension)	Topsportcentrum, Almere; Attendance: 2,200; Referees: Baumgart, Wild (GER)

==== Group 6 ====
Pos	Team	Pld	W	D	L	GF	GA	GD	Pts	Qualification
1	Hungary	6	5	0	1	226	168	+58	10	Final tournament
2	Switzerland	6	4	0	2	163	161	+2	8	Final tournament
3	Georgia	6	2	0	4	156	174	−18	4	Final tournament
4	Lithuania	6	1	0	5	153	195	−42	2	

Source: EHF
Rules for classification: 1) points; 2) head-to-head points; 3) head-to-head goal difference; 4) head-to-head number of goals scored; 5) goal difference.

12 October 2022; 18:00	Switzerland	24–23	Georgia	Mobiliar Arena, Gümligen; Attendance: 1,380; Referees: Kaluđerović, Vujačić (MNE)
12 October 2022; 18:00	Schmid 8	(15–12)	Tskhovrebadze 7	Mobiliar Arena, Gümligen; Attendance: 1,380; Referees: Kaluđerović, Vujačić (MNE)
12 October 2022; 18:00	2× (yellow card) 4× (suspension)	Report	2× (suspension)	Mobiliar Arena, Gümligen; Attendance: 1,380; Referees: Kaluđerović, Vujačić (MNE)

12 October 2022; 18:30	Hungary	36–23	Lithuania	Érd Aréna, Érd; Attendance: 1,800; Referees: Pandžić, Mošorinski (SRB)
12 October 2022; 18:30	Lékai 5	(20–13)	Malašinskas, Rasakevičius 5	Érd Aréna, Érd; Attendance: 1,800; Referees: Pandžić, Mošorinski (SRB)
12 October 2022; 18:30	1× (yellow card) 5× (suspension)	Report	2× (yellow card) 6× (suspension) 1× (red card)	Érd Aréna, Érd; Attendance: 1,800; Referees: Pandžić, Mošorinski (SRB)

16 October 2022; 13:45	Lithuania	26–27	Switzerland	Švyturys Arena, Klaipėda; Attendance: 890; Referees: Mitrevski, Todorovski (MKD)
16 October 2022; 13:45	G. Babarskas 6	(11–17)	Rubin 10	Švyturys Arena, Klaipėda; Attendance: 890; Referees: Mitrevski, Todorovski (MKD)
16 October 2022; 13:45	1× (yellow card) 8× (suspension)	Report	1× (yellow card) 4× (suspension) 1× (red card)	Švyturys Arena, Klaipėda; Attendance: 890; Referees: Mitrevski, Todorovski (MKD)

16 October 2022; 16:00	Georgia	24–41	Hungary	Olympic Palace, Tbilisi; Attendance: 1,300; Referees: Sirbu, Serdiuc (MDA)
16 October 2022; 16:00	Tskhovrebadze 6	(11–18)	Bóka 8	Olympic Palace, Tbilisi; Attendance: 1,300; Referees: Sirbu, Serdiuc (MDA)
16 October 2022; 16:00	1× (yellow card) 3× (suspension)	Report	3× (suspension) 1× (red card)	Olympic Palace, Tbilisi; Attendance: 1,300; Referees: Sirbu, Serdiuc (MDA)

8 March 2023; 15:00	Georgia	32–18	Lithuania	Olympic Palace, Tbilisi; Attendance: 1,850; Referees: Panayides, Andreou (CYP)
8 March 2023; 15:00	Tskhovrebadze 10	(16–7)	Jovaiša 4	Olympic Palace, Tbilisi; Attendance: 1,850; Referees: Panayides, Andreou (CYP)
8 March 2023; 15:00	1× (yellow card) 5× (suspension)	Report	1× (yellow card) 3× (suspension)	Olympic Palace, Tbilisi; Attendance: 1,850; Referees: Panayides, Andreou (CYP)

9 March 2023; 19:00	Switzerland	32–37	Hungary	BBC Arena, Schaffhausen; Attendance: 2,073; Referees: Schulze, Tönnies (GER)
9 March 2023; 19:00	Rubin 8	(19–21)	Lékai 14	BBC Arena, Schaffhausen; Attendance: 2,073; Referees: Schulze, Tönnies (GER)
9 March 2023; 19:00	1× (yellow card) 2× (suspension)	Report	3× (suspension)	BBC Arena, Schaffhausen; Attendance: 2,073; Referees: Schulze, Tönnies (GER)

12 March 2023; 15:00	Lithuania	35–27	Georgia	Švyturys Arena, Klaipėda; Attendance: 1,300; Referees: Picard, Vauchez (FRA)
12 March 2023; 15:00	G. Babarskas 11	(13–9)	Dikhaminjia, Kalandadze 7	Švyturys Arena, Klaipėda; Attendance: 1,300; Referees: Picard, Vauchez (FRA)
12 March 2023; 15:00	7× (suspension) 1× (red card)	Report	2× (yellow card) 2× (suspension) 1× (red card)	Švyturys Arena, Klaipėda; Attendance: 1,300; Referees: Picard, Vauchez (FRA)

12 March 2023; 16:00	Hungary	36–27	Switzerland	Tatabányai Multifunkcionális Sportcsarnok, Tatabánya; Attendance: 5,500; Referees: Leszczyński, Piechota (POL)
12 March 2023; 16:00	Rosta 10	(16–10)	Aellen, Meister 5	Tatabányai Multifunkcionális Sportcsarnok, Tatabánya; Attendance: 5,500; Referees: Leszczyński, Piechota (POL)
12 March 2023; 16:00	4× (suspension)	Report	3× (suspension)	Tatabányai Multifunkcionális Sportcsarnok, Tatabánya; Attendance: 5,500; Referees: Leszczyński, Piechota (POL)

26 April 2023; 16:00	Georgia	19–26	Switzerland	Olympic Palace, Tbilisi; Attendance: 1,000; Referees: Mandák, Rudinský (SVK)
26 April 2023; 16:00	Kalandadze 6	(10–14)	Rubin 6	Olympic Palace, Tbilisi; Attendance: 1,000; Referees: Mandák, Rudinský (SVK)
26 April 2023; 16:00	1× (yellow card) 3× (suspension)	Report	1× (yellow card) 7× (suspension)	Olympic Palace, Tbilisi; Attendance: 1,000; Referees: Mandák, Rudinský (SVK)

27 April 2023; 18:00	Lithuania	31–46	Hungary	Švyturys Arena, Klaipėda; Attendance: 1,100; Referees: M. Sá, V. Sá (POR)
27 April 2023; 18:00	Malašinskas 7	(14–22)	Imre, Rosta 9	Švyturys Arena, Klaipėda; Attendance: 1,100; Referees: M. Sá, V. Sá (POR)
27 April 2023; 18:00	6× (suspension) 1× (red card)	Report	1× (yellow card) 4× (suspension)	Švyturys Arena, Klaipėda; Attendance: 1,100; Referees: M. Sá, V. Sá (POR)

30 April 2023; 18:00	Hungary	30–31	Georgia	Tatabányai Multifunkcionális Sportcsarnok, Tatabánya; Attendance: 2,200; Referees: Fotakidis, Kinatzidis (GRE)
30 April 2023; 18:00	Hanusz 7	(14–17)	Tskhovrebadze 8	Tatabányai Multifunkcionális Sportcsarnok, Tatabánya; Attendance: 2,200; Referees: Fotakidis, Kinatzidis (GRE)
30 April 2023; 18:00	1× (yellow card) 1× (suspension)	Report	1× (yellow card) 5× (suspension) 1× (red card)	Tatabányai Multifunkcionális Sportcsarnok, Tatabánya; Attendance: 2,200; Referees: Fotakidis, Kinatzidis (GRE)

30 April 2023; 18:00	Switzerland	27–20	Lithuania	Winterthur Central Sports Hall, Winterthur; Attendance: 1,920; Referees: Bolic, Hurich (AUT)
30 April 2023; 18:00	Laube 5	(16–6)	Malašinskas 5	Winterthur Central Sports Hall, Winterthur; Attendance: 1,920; Referees: Bolic, Hurich (AUT)
30 April 2023; 18:00	1× (yellow card) 1× (suspension)	Report	1× (yellow card) 6× (suspension)	Winterthur Central Sports Hall, Winterthur; Attendance: 1,920; Referees: Bolic, Hurich (AUT)

==== Group 7 ====
Pos	Team	Pld	W	D	L	GF	GA	GD	Pts	Qualification
1	Slovenia	6	5	0	1	185	158	+27	10	Final tournament
2	Bosnia and Herzegovina	6	4	0	2	147	153	−6	8	Final tournament
3	Montenegro	6	3	0	3	173	163	+10	6	Final tournament
4	Kosovo	6	0	0	6	136	167	−31	0	

Source: EHF
Rules for classification: 1) points; 2) head-to-head points; 3) head-to-head goal difference; 4) head-to-head number of goals scored; 5) goal difference.

12 October 2022; 18:00	Montenegro	29–20	Kosovo	Morača Sports Center, Podgorica; Attendance: 2,200; Referees: Bolic, Hurich (AUT)
12 October 2022; 18:00	M. Vujović 8	(15–9)	Dri. Tahirukaj 5	Morača Sports Center, Podgorica; Attendance: 2,200; Referees: Bolic, Hurich (AUT)
12 October 2022; 18:00	1× (yellow card) 3× (suspension)	Report	2× (yellow card) 2× (suspension)	Morača Sports Center, Podgorica; Attendance: 2,200; Referees: Bolic, Hurich (AUT)

13 October 2022; 20:00	Slovenia	28–20	Bosnia and Herzegovina	Tabor Hall, Maribor; Attendance: 2,100; Referees: Caçador, Nicolau (POR)
13 October 2022; 20:00	Vlah 7	(13–10)	Građan 5	Tabor Hall, Maribor; Attendance: 2,100; Referees: Caçador, Nicolau (POR)
13 October 2022; 20:00	2× (suspension)	Report	1× (yellow card) 3× (suspension)	Tabor Hall, Maribor; Attendance: 2,100; Referees: Caçador, Nicolau (POR)

16 October 2022; 19:30	Kosovo	24–29	Slovenia	Palace of Youth and Sports, Pristina; Attendance: 1,500; Referees: Mandák, Rudinský (SVK)
16 October 2022; 19:30	Gjuka 7	(12–14)	Janc 6	Palace of Youth and Sports, Pristina; Attendance: 1,500; Referees: Mandák, Rudinský (SVK)
16 October 2022; 19:30	1× (yellow card) 9× (suspension) 1× (red card)	Report	6× (suspension)	Palace of Youth and Sports, Pristina; Attendance: 1,500; Referees: Mandák, Rudinský (SVK)

16 October 2022; 20:00	Bosnia and Herzegovina	25–36	Montenegro	Mirza Delibašić Hall, Sarajevo; Attendance: 3,100; Referees: Horváth, Marton (HUN)
16 October 2022; 20:00	Davidović 10	(11–21)	M. Vujović 8	Mirza Delibašić Hall, Sarajevo; Attendance: 3,100; Referees: Horváth, Marton (HUN)
16 October 2022; 20:00	1× (yellow card) 4× (suspension)	Report	1× (yellow card) 3× (suspension)	Mirza Delibašić Hall, Sarajevo; Attendance: 3,100; Referees: Horváth, Marton (HUN)

8 March 2023; 20:15	Kosovo	22–25	Bosnia and Herzegovina	Palace of Youth and Sports, Pristina; Attendance: 2,010; Referees: Carmaux, Mursch (FRA)
8 March 2023; 20:15	Tahirukaj 5	(10–14)	Bošković, S. Burić 5	Palace of Youth and Sports, Pristina; Attendance: 2,010; Referees: Carmaux, Mursch (FRA)
8 March 2023; 20:15	2× (suspension)	Report	1× (yellow card) 4× (suspension)	Palace of Youth and Sports, Pristina; Attendance: 2,010; Referees: Carmaux, Mursch (FRA)

9 March 2023; 18:00	Montenegro	29–32	Slovenia	Morača Sports Center, Podgorica; Attendance: 5,900; Referees: Hansen, Madsen (DEN)
9 March 2023; 18:00	Kaluđerović, B. Vujović 5	(14–14)	Vlah 8	Morača Sports Center, Podgorica; Attendance: 5,900; Referees: Hansen, Madsen (DEN)
9 March 2023; 18:00	2× (suspension) 1× (red card)	Report	1× (yellow card) 4× (suspension) 2× (red card)	Morača Sports Center, Podgorica; Attendance: 5,900; Referees: Hansen, Madsen (DEN)

12 March 2023; 17:00	Bosnia and Herzegovina	25–18	Kosovo	KSPC Mejdan, Tuzla; Attendance: 3,500; Referees: Pirvu, Potîrniche (ROU)
12 March 2023; 17:00	S. Burić 7	(10–7)	Dedaj 5	KSPC Mejdan, Tuzla; Attendance: 3,500; Referees: Pirvu, Potîrniche (ROU)
12 March 2023; 17:00	7× (suspension)	Report	1× (yellow card) 6× (suspension)	KSPC Mejdan, Tuzla; Attendance: 3,500; Referees: Pirvu, Potîrniche (ROU)

12 March 2023; 18:30	Slovenia	37–30	Montenegro	Arena Bonifika, Koper; Attendance: 3,400; Referees: Marín, Garcia (ESP)
12 March 2023; 18:30	Janc 10	(18–16)	B. Vujović 8	Arena Bonifika, Koper; Attendance: 3,400; Referees: Marín, Garcia (ESP)
12 March 2023; 18:30	7× (suspension)	Report	2× (yellow card) 2× (suspension)	Arena Bonifika, Koper; Attendance: 3,400; Referees: Marín, Garcia (ESP)

27 April 2023; 20:00	Bosnia and Herzegovina	27–26	Slovenia	JU Sportski centar Salih Omerčević, Cazin; Attendance: 2,000; Referees: Jerlecki, Łabuń (POL)
27 April 2023; 20:00	S. Burić 7	(15–15)	Novak 6	JU Sportski centar Salih Omerčević, Cazin; Attendance: 2,000; Referees: Jerlecki, Łabuń (POL)
27 April 2023; 20:00	3× (suspension)	Report	3× (suspension)	JU Sportski centar Salih Omerčević, Cazin; Attendance: 2,000; Referees: Jerlecki, Łabuń (POL)

27 April 2023; 20:15	Kosovo	24–26	Montenegro	Palace of Youth and Sports, Pristina; Attendance: 1,260; Referees: C. Hannes, D. Hannes (GER)
27 April 2023; 20:15	Tahirukaj 6	(6–11)	B. Vujović 7	Palace of Youth and Sports, Pristina; Attendance: 1,260; Referees: C. Hannes, D. Hannes (GER)
27 April 2023; 20:15	1× (yellow card) 2× (suspension)	Report	2× (yellow card) 4× (suspension)	Palace of Youth and Sports, Pristina; Attendance: 1,260; Referees: C. Hannes, D. Hannes (GER)

30 April 2023; 18:00	Slovenia	33–28	Kosovo	Red Hall, Velenje; Attendance: 1,558; Referees: Kinnari, Skogberg (FIN)
30 April 2023; 18:00	Jovičić, Strmljan 6	(19–12)	Dedaj 8	Red Hall, Velenje; Attendance: 1,558; Referees: Kinnari, Skogberg (FIN)
30 April 2023; 18:00	1× (yellow card) 4× (suspension)	Report	2× (suspension)	Red Hall, Velenje; Attendance: 1,558; Referees: Kinnari, Skogberg (FIN)

30 April 2023; 18:00	Montenegro	23–25	Bosnia and Herzegovina	Morača Sports Center, Podgorica; Attendance: 4,500; Referees: Tzaferopoulos, Bethmann (GRE)
30 April 2023; 18:00	Radović, M. Vujović 6	(13–14)	Herceg 7	Morača Sports Center, Podgorica; Attendance: 4,500; Referees: Tzaferopoulos, Bethmann (GRE)
30 April 2023; 18:00	2× (yellow card) 2× (suspension)	Report	2× (yellow card) 4× (suspension)	Morača Sports Center, Podgorica; Attendance: 4,500; Referees: Tzaferopoulos, Bethmann (GRE)

==== Group 8 ====
Pos	Team	Pld	W	D	L	GF	GA	GD	Pts	Qualification
1	France	6	6	0	0	222	148	+74	12	Final tournament
2	Poland	6	4	0	2	184	153	+31	8	Final tournament
3	Italy	6	2	0	4	173	188	−15	4	
4	Latvia	6	0	0	6	116	206	−90	0	

Source: EHF
Rules for classification: 1) points; 2) head-to-head points; 3) head-to-head goal difference; 4) head-to-head number of goals scored; 5) goal difference.

13 October 2022; 18:30	Poland	30–23	Italy	Spodek, Katowice; Attendance: 6,994; Referees: Jović, Arnautović (BIH)
13 October 2022; 18:30	Moryto 9	(10–9)	Parisini 8	Spodek, Katowice; Attendance: 6,994; Referees: Jović, Arnautović (BIH)
13 October 2022; 18:30	1× (yellow card) 1× (suspension)	Report	3× (suspension)	Spodek, Katowice; Attendance: 6,994; Referees: Jović, Arnautović (BIH)

13 October 2022; 21:10	France	35–18	Latvia	Arena Futuroscope, Poitiers; Attendance: 4,200; Referees: Kinnari, Skogberg (FIN)
13 October 2022; 21:10	Fabregas, Nahi 5	(16–7)	Kurzemnieks 5	Arena Futuroscope, Poitiers; Attendance: 4,200; Referees: Kinnari, Skogberg (FIN)
13 October 2022; 21:10	1× (yellow card) 2× (suspension)	Report	1× (yellow card) 3× (suspension)	Arena Futuroscope, Poitiers; Attendance: 4,200; Referees: Kinnari, Skogberg (FIN)

16 October 2022; 14:10	Latvia	19–37	Poland	Valmiera Olympic Centre, Valmiera; Attendance: 395; Referees: Tzaferopoulos, Bethmann (GRE)
16 October 2022; 14:10	Pančenko 5	(9–13)	Moryto 10	Valmiera Olympic Centre, Valmiera; Attendance: 395; Referees: Tzaferopoulos, Bethmann (GRE)
16 October 2022; 14:10	2× (yellow card) 4× (suspension)	Report	1× (yellow card) 4× (suspension)	Valmiera Olympic Centre, Valmiera; Attendance: 395; Referees: Tzaferopoulos, Bethmann (GRE)

16 October 2022; 18:00	Italy	29–40	France	Palasport Giovanni Paolo II, Pescara; Attendance: 1,800; Referees: Fukala, Mohyla (CZE)
16 October 2022; 18:00	Parisini 7	(13–19)	Tournat 7	Palasport Giovanni Paolo II, Pescara; Attendance: 1,800; Referees: Fukala, Mohyla (CZE)
16 October 2022; 18:00	1× (suspension)	Report	1× (yellow card) 2× (suspension)	Palasport Giovanni Paolo II, Pescara; Attendance: 1,800; Referees: Fukala, Mohyla (CZE)

8 March 2023; 18:00	Poland	28–38	France	Ergo Arena, Gdańsk; Attendance: 9,000; Referees: Pavićević, Ražnatović (MNE)
8 March 2023; 18:00	Widomski 5	(11–22)	Nahi 10	Ergo Arena, Gdańsk; Attendance: 9,000; Referees: Pavićević, Ražnatović (MNE)
8 March 2023; 18:00	4× (suspension)	Report	2× (suspension)	Ergo Arena, Gdańsk; Attendance: 9,000; Referees: Pavićević, Ražnatović (MNE)

9 March 2023; 16:00	Italy	36–23	Latvia	Palasport Giovanni Paolo II, Pescara; Attendance: 1,000; Referees: R. Geraets, P. Geraets (NED)
9 March 2023; 16:00	Marrochi 6	(15–10)	Geislers 6	Palasport Giovanni Paolo II, Pescara; Attendance: 1,000; Referees: R. Geraets, P. Geraets (NED)
9 March 2023; 16:00		Report	1× (yellow card) 1× (suspension)	Palasport Giovanni Paolo II, Pescara; Attendance: 1,000; Referees: R. Geraets, P. Geraets (NED)

11 March 2023; 21:10	France	30–27	Poland	Arena du Pays d'Aix, Aix-en-Provence; Attendance: 6,079; Referees: Merz, Kuttler (GER)
11 March 2023; 21:10	Mem, Nahi 5	(16–14)	Czuwara 5	Arena du Pays d'Aix, Aix-en-Provence; Attendance: 6,079; Referees: Merz, Kuttler (GER)
11 March 2023; 21:10	1× (yellow card)	Report	1× (yellow card) 2× (suspension)	Arena du Pays d'Aix, Aix-en-Provence; Attendance: 6,079; Referees: Merz, Kuttler (GER)

12 March 2023; 14:10	Latvia	23–29	Italy	Valmiera Olympic Centre, Valmiera; Attendance: 680; Referees: Andorka, Hucker (HUN)
12 March 2023; 14:10	Veršakovs 8	(12–14)	Dapiran, Prantner 5	Valmiera Olympic Centre, Valmiera; Attendance: 680; Referees: Andorka, Hucker (HUN)
12 March 2023; 14:10	2× (yellow card) 5× (suspension)	Report	3× (suspension)	Valmiera Olympic Centre, Valmiera; Attendance: 680; Referees: Andorka, Hucker (HUN)

26 April 2023; 18:40	Latvia	19–38	France	Valmiera Olympic Centre, Valmiera; Attendance: 650; Referees: Härgin, Makejev (EST)
26 April 2023; 18:40	Piļpuks 4	(9–20)	four players 5	Valmiera Olympic Centre, Valmiera; Attendance: 650; Referees: Härgin, Makejev (EST)
26 April 2023; 18:40	1× (yellow card) 4× (suspension)	Report	1× (yellow card) 2× (suspension)	Valmiera Olympic Centre, Valmiera; Attendance: 650; Referees: Härgin, Makejev (EST)

27 April 2023; 18:00	Italy	29–31	Poland	Palazzetto Polifunzionale, Vigevano; Attendance: 2,400; Referees: Sekulić, Jovandić (SRB)
27 April 2023; 18:00	Marrochi 11	(15–13)	Syprzak 7	Palazzetto Polifunzionale, Vigevano; Attendance: 2,400; Referees: Sekulić, Jovandić (SRB)
27 April 2023; 18:00	5× (suspension)	Report	8× (suspension)	Palazzetto Polifunzionale, Vigevano; Attendance: 2,400; Referees: Sekulić, Jovandić (SRB)

30 April 2023; 18:00	France	41–27	Italy	Le Kindarena, Rouen; Attendance: 5,404; Referees: Maia, Nunes (POR)
30 April 2023; 18:00	three players 6	(24–11)	Dapiran 6	Le Kindarena, Rouen; Attendance: 5,404; Referees: Maia, Nunes (POR)
30 April 2023; 18:00	1× (suspension)	Report	2× (suspension)	Le Kindarena, Rouen; Attendance: 5,404; Referees: Maia, Nunes (POR)

30 April 2023; 18:00	Poland	31–14	Latvia	Arena Ostrów, Ostrów Wielkopolski; Attendance: 2,500; Referees: Me. Ilievski, Mi. Ilievski (MKD)
30 April 2023; 18:00	Moryto 6	(16–9)	Juzups 3	Arena Ostrów, Ostrów Wielkopolski; Attendance: 2,500; Referees: Me. Ilievski, Mi. Ilievski (MKD)
30 April 2023; 18:00	1× (yellow card) 5× (suspension)	Report	1× (yellow card) 5× (suspension)	Arena Ostrów, Ostrów Wielkopolski; Attendance: 2,500; Referees: Me. Ilievski, Mi. Ilievski (MKD)

==== Ranking of third-placed teams ====
The results against the fourth-placed team are omitted.

Pos	Grp	Team	Pld	W	D	L	GF	GA	GD	Pts	Qualification
1	7	Montenegro	4	1	0	3	118	119	−1	2	Final tournament
2	4	Faroe Islands	4	1	0	3	106	119	−13	2	Final tournament
3	5	Greece	4	1	0	3	109	124	−15	2	Final tournament
4	6	Georgia	4	1	0	3	97	121	−24	2	Final tournament
5	3	Estonia	4	0	0	4	101	130	−29	0	2026 Euro Qualifiers Phase 2
6	1	Turkey	4	0	0	4	116	147	−31	0	2026 Euro Qualifiers Phase 2
7	8	Italy	4	0	0	4	108	142	−34	0	2026 Euro Qualifiers Phase 2
8	2	Slovakia	4	0	0	4	96	135	−39	0	2026 Euro Qualifiers Phase 2

Source: EHF
Rules for classification: 1) points; 2) goal difference; 3) number of goals scored; 4) draw.

==== Ranking of fourth-placed teams ====
Pos	Grp	Team	Pld	W	D	L	GF	GA	GD	Pts	Qualification
1	4	Ukraine	6	2	0	4	171	187	−16	4	2026 Euro Qualifiers Phase 2
2	2	Finland	6	1	0	5	153	190	−37	2	2026 Euro Qualifiers Phase 2
3	3	Israel	6	1	0	5	147	186	−39	2	2026 Euro Qualifiers Phase 2
4	6	Lithuania	6	1	0	5	153	195	−42	2	2026 Euro Qualifiers Phase 2
5	5	Belgium	6	0	0	6	151	169	−18	0	2026 Euro Qualifiers Relegation round
6	7	Kosovo	6	0	0	6	136	167	−31	0	2026 Euro Qualifiers Relegation round
7	1	Luxembourg	6	0	0	6	135	195	−60	0	2026 Euro Qualifiers Relegation round
8	8	Latvia	6	0	0	6	116	206	−90	0	2026 Euro Qualifiers Relegation round

Source: EHF
Rules for classification: 1) points; 2) goal difference; 3) number of goals scored; 4) draw.

== EHF Euro Cup ==
The EHF Euro Cup was played between the 2024 hosts, Germany, plus the top 3 from 2022 Handball Euro, champions Sweden, second place, Spain and third place, Denmark. The champions were Denmark.

Pos	Team	Pld	W	D	L	GF	GA	GD	Pts
1	Denmark (C)	6	5	0	1	197	169	+28	10 (Note: Denmark 69–65 Sweden)
2	Sweden	6	5	0	1	198	185	+13	10
3	Spain	6	1	0	5	183	197	−14	2 (Note: Spain 63–63 Germany, decided on goal difference)
4	Germany	6	1	0	5	163	190	−27	2

Source: EHF
Rules for classification: 1) points; 2) head-to-head points; 3) head-to-head goal difference; 4) head-to-head number of goals scored; 5) goal difference.
(C) Champions
Notes:

12 October 2022; 21:00	Denmark	39–31	Spain	Royal Arena, Copenhagen; Attendance: 11,375; Referees: Vešović, Mitrović (MNE)
12 October 2022; 21:00	Gidsel 8	(19–16)	D. Dujshebaev, Odriozola 5	Royal Arena, Copenhagen; Attendance: 11,375; Referees: Vešović, Mitrović (MNE)
12 October 2022; 21:00	3× (yellow card) 2× (suspension)	Report	1× (yellow card) 2× (suspension)	Royal Arena, Copenhagen; Attendance: 11,375; Referees: Vešović, Mitrović (MNE)

13 October 2022; 19:00	Germany	33–37	Sweden	SAP Arena, Mannheim; Attendance: 9,221; Referees: Sekulić, Jovandić (SRB)
13 October 2022; 19:00	Golla 12	(16–19)	three players 5	SAP Arena, Mannheim; Attendance: 9,221; Referees: Sekulić, Jovandić (SRB)
13 October 2022; 19:00	2× (suspension)	Report	2× (suspension)	SAP Arena, Mannheim; Attendance: 9,221; Referees: Sekulić, Jovandić (SRB)

15 October 2022; 20:15	Spain	32–31	Germany	Palacio de Deportes Olivo Arena, Jaen; Attendance: 5,000; Referees: Gasmi, Gasmi (FRA)
15 October 2022; 20:15	Figueras 8	(13–13)	Häfner 9	Palacio de Deportes Olivo Arena, Jaen; Attendance: 5,000; Referees: Gasmi, Gasmi (FRA)
15 October 2022; 20:15	1× (yellow card) 2× (suspension)	Report	1× (yellow card) 5× (suspension)	Palacio de Deportes Olivo Arena, Jaen; Attendance: 5,000; Referees: Gasmi, Gasmi (FRA)

16 October 2022; 16:00	Sweden	34–32	Denmark	Scandinavium, Gothenburg; Attendance: 10,068; Referees: Biró, Kiss (HUN)
16 October 2022; 16:00	Gottfridsson 5	(17–17)	M. Hansen, Pytlick 6	Scandinavium, Gothenburg; Attendance: 10,068; Referees: Biró, Kiss (HUN)
16 October 2022; 16:00	2× (suspension)	Report	1× (suspension) 1× (red card)	Scandinavium, Gothenburg; Attendance: 10,068; Referees: Biró, Kiss (HUN)

8 March 2023; 19:10	Sweden	33–30	Spain	Saab Arena, Linköping; Attendance: 6,554; Referees: Lončar, Lončar (CRO)
8 March 2023; 19:10	Claar 8	(13–12)	three players 5	Saab Arena, Linköping; Attendance: 6,554; Referees: Lončar, Lončar (CRO)
8 March 2023; 19:10	1× (yellow card) 6× (suspension)	Report	6× (suspension) 1× (red card)	Saab Arena, Linköping; Attendance: 6,554; Referees: Lončar, Lončar (CRO)

9 March 2023; 20:45	Denmark	30–23	Germany	Gigantium, Aalborg; Attendance: 4,820; Referees: Budzák, Záhradník (SVK)
9 March 2023; 20:45	Arnoldsen 7	(16–11)	Knorr 5	Gigantium, Aalborg; Attendance: 4,820; Referees: Budzák, Záhradník (SVK)
9 March 2023; 20:45	3× (suspension)	Report	2× (suspension)	Gigantium, Aalborg; Attendance: 4,820; Referees: Budzák, Záhradník (SVK)

12 March 2023; 14:15	Germany	21–28	Denmark	Barclays Arena, Hamburg; Attendance: 12,123; Referees: Konjičanin, Konjičanin (BIH)
12 March 2023; 14:15	Knorr 9	(10–14)	Jakobsen 6	Barclays Arena, Hamburg; Attendance: 12,123; Referees: Konjičanin, Konjičanin (BIH)
12 March 2023; 14:15	3× (suspension)	Report	1× (suspension)	Barclays Arena, Hamburg; Attendance: 12,123; Referees: Konjičanin, Konjičanin (BIH)

12 March 2023; 18:00	Spain	30–31	Sweden	Palacio de Deportes Olivo Arena, Jaen; Attendance: 5,200; Referees: Bolic, Hurich (AUT)
12 March 2023; 18:00	Garciandia 8	(14–18)	Claar, Mellegård 7	Palacio de Deportes Olivo Arena, Jaen; Attendance: 5,200; Referees: Bolic, Hurich (AUT)
12 March 2023; 18:00	1× (yellow card) 4× (suspension)	Report	1× (yellow card) 3× (suspension)	Palacio de Deportes Olivo Arena, Jaen; Attendance: 5,200; Referees: Bolic, Hurich (AUT)

27 April 2023; 18:35	Sweden	32–23	Germany	Kristianstad Arena, Kristianstad; Attendance: 4,716; Referees: Petursson, Thrastarson (ISL)
27 April 2023; 18:35	Wanne 6	(16–8)	Golla, Uščins 5	Kristianstad Arena, Kristianstad; Attendance: 4,716; Referees: Petursson, Thrastarson (ISL)
27 April 2023; 18:35	1× (yellow card) 4× (suspension)	Report	1× (yellow card) 3× (suspension)	Kristianstad Arena, Kristianstad; Attendance: 4,716; Referees: Petursson, Thrastarson (ISL)

27 April 2023; 21:00	Spain	29–31	Denmark	Mediterranean Sports Palace, Almería; Attendance: 5,000; Referees: Covalciuc, Covalciuc (MDA)
27 April 2023; 21:00	Solé 6	(14–15)	Lauge, Jakobsen 7	Mediterranean Sports Palace, Almería; Attendance: 5,000; Referees: Covalciuc, Covalciuc (MDA)
27 April 2023; 21:00	2× (suspension)	Report	2× (suspension)	Mediterranean Sports Palace, Almería; Attendance: 5,000; Referees: Covalciuc, Covalciuc (MDA)

29 April 2023; 16:00	Denmark	37–31	Sweden	Jyske Bank Boxen, Herning; Attendance: 10,230; Referees: Thiyagarajah, Thiyagarajah (GER)
29 April 2023; 16:00	Gidsel 8	(23–17)	Carlsbogård 7	Jyske Bank Boxen, Herning; Attendance: 10,230; Referees: Thiyagarajah, Thiyagarajah (GER)
29 April 2023; 16:00	1× (yellow card) 3× (suspension)	Report	5× (suspension)	Jyske Bank Boxen, Herning; Attendance: 10,230; Referees: Thiyagarajah, Thiyagarajah (GER)

30 April 2023; 15:35	Germany	32–31	Spain	Max-Schmeling-Halle, Berlin; Attendance: 8,204; Referees: Jørum, Kleven (NOR)
30 April 2023; 15:35	Knorr 13	(20–11)	four players 5	Max-Schmeling-Halle, Berlin; Attendance: 8,204; Referees: Jørum, Kleven (NOR)
30 April 2023; 15:35	8× (suspension) 1× (red card)	Report	1× (yellow card) 5× (suspension)	Max-Schmeling-Halle, Berlin; Attendance: 8,204; Referees: Jørum, Kleven (NOR)

== Qualified teams ==
Country	Qualified as	Qualified on	Previous appearances in tournament
Germany	Host	20 June 2018	14 (1994, 1996, 1998, 2000, 2002, **2004**, 2006, 2008, 2010, 2012, **2016**, 2018, 2020, 2022)
Spain	Top three at 2022 European Championship	28 January 2022	15 (1994, 1996, 1998, 2000, 2002, 2004, 2006, 2008, 2010, 2012, 2014, 2016, **2018**, **2020**, 2022)
Sweden	Top three at 2022 European Championship	28 January 2022	14 (**1994**, 1996, **1998**, **2000**, **2002**, 2004, 2008, 2010, 2012, 2014, 2016, 2018, 2020, **2022**)
Denmark	Top three at 2022 European Championship	30 January 2022	14 (1994, 1996, 2000, 2002, 2004, 2006, **2008**, 2010, **2012**, 2014, 2016, 2018, 2020, 2022)
Austria	Group 4 top-two	11 March 2023	5 (2010, 2014, 2018, 2020, 2022)
France	Group 8 top-two	11 March 2023	15 (1994, 1996, 1998, 2000, 2002, 2004, **2006**, 2008, **2010**, 2012, **2014**, 2016, 2018, 2020, 2022)
Hungary	Group 6 top-two	12 March 2023	13 (1994, 1996, 1998, 2004, 2006, 2008, 2010, 2012, 2014, 2016, 2018, 2020, 2022)
Portugal	Group 1 top-two	12 March 2023	7 (1994, 2000, 2002, 2004, 2006, 2020, 2022)
Slovenia	Group 7 top-two	12 March 2023	13 (1994, 1996, 2000, 2002, 2004, 2006, 2008, 2010, 2012, 2016, 2018, 2020, 2022)
Croatia	Group 5 top-two	26 April 2023	15 (1994, 1996, 1998, 2000, 2002, 2004, 2006, 2008, 2010, 2012, 2014, 2016, 2018, 2020, 2022)
Norway	Group 2 top-two	26 April 2023	10 (2000, 2006, 2008, 2010, 2012, 2014, 2016, 2018, 2020, 2022)
Serbia	Group 2 top-two	26 April 2023	7 (2010, 2012, 2014, 2016, 2018, 2020, 2022)
Iceland	Group 3 top-two	27 April 2023	12 (2000, 2002, 2004, 2006, 2008, 2010, 2012, 2014, 2016, 2018, 2020, 2022)
Czech Republic	Group 3 top-two	27 April 2023	11 (1996, 1998, 2002, 2004, 2008, 2010, 2012, 2014, 2018, 2020, 2022)
Switzerland	Group 6 top-two	27 April 2023	4 (2002, 2004, 2006, 2020)
Poland	Group 8 top-two	27 April 2023	10 (2002, 2004, 2006, 2008, 2010, 2012, 2014, 2016, 2020, 2022)
North Macedonia	Group 1 top-two	30 April 2023	7 (1998, 2012, 2014, 2016, 2018, 2020, 2022)
Romania	Group 4 top-two	30 April 2023	2 (1994, 1996)
Netherlands	Group 5 top-two	30 April 2023	2 (2020, 2022)
Bosnia and Herzegovina	Group 7 top-two	30 April 2023	2 (2020, 2022)
Montenegro	One of four-best third-ranked teams	30 April 2023	6 (2008, 2014, 2016, 2018, 2020, 2022)
Faroe Islands	One of four-best third-ranked teams	30 April 2023	0 (debut)
Greece	One of four-best third-ranked teams	30 April 2023	0 (debut)
Georgia	One of four-best third-ranked teams	30 April 2023	0 (debut)

Note: Bold indicates champion for that year. Italic indicates host for that year.
