= 2024 in handball =

The following were handball events during 2024 throughout the world.

== Beach handball ==
=== World Championships ===
- June 18–23: 2024 Men's Beach Handball World Championships & 2024 Women's Beach Handball World Championships in China

== Handball ==
=== IHF Championships ===
- June 19–30: 2024 Women's Junior World Handball Championship in North Macedonia
- August 14–25: 2024 Women's Youth World Handball Championship in China

=== AHF ===
- January 11–25: 2024 Asian Men's Handball Championship in Bahrain
  - (gold) : Qatar, (silver) : Japan, (bronze) : Bahrain

=== EHF ===
- January 10–28: 2024 European Men's Handball Championship in Germany
  - (gold) France, (silver) Denmark, (bronze) Sweden
- November 28 – December 15: 2024 European Women's Handball Championship in Austria, Hungary and Switzerland

Club competitions

- September 13, 2023 – June 9: 2023–24 EHF Champions League (final four in (Germany) Cologne)
- September 9, 2023 – June 2: 2023–24 Women's EHF Champions League (final four in (Hungary) Budapest)
- August 26, 2023 – May 23: 2023–24 EHF European League
- September 23, 2023 – May 12: 2023–24 Women's EHF European League
- September 9, 2023 – May 26: 2023–24 EHF European Cup
- September 23, 2023 – May 26: 2023–24 Women's EHF European Cup

=== CAHB ===
- January 17–27: 2024 African Men's Handball Championship in Egypt
  - (gold) : Egypt, (silver) : Algeria, (bronze) : Tunisia
- November–December: 2024 African Women's Handball Championship in Democratic Republic of the Congo

=== Domestic league seasons (incomplete) ===
Men

Nation	League	Champion	Second place	Title	Last honour
Denmark	2023–24 Håndboldligaen	Aalborg Håndbold	Fredericia KFUM	7th	2020–21
Finland	2023–24 Finnish Handball League	BK-46	Riihimäki Cocks	23rd	2022–23
France	2023–24 LNH Division 1	Paris Saint-Germain	HBC Nantes	11th	2022–23
Germany	2023–24 Handball-Bundesliga	SC Magdeburg	Füchse Berlin	3rd	2021–22
Hungary	2023–24 Nemzeti Bajnokság I	Veszprém	Szeged	28th	2022–23
Iceland	2023–24 Úrvalsdeild karla	FH	UMF Afturelding	1st	—
Montenegro	2023–24 Montenegrin Men's Handball First League	RK Lovćen Cetinje	RK Budvanska rivijera	11th	2022–23
Norway	REMA 1000-ligaen	Kolstad	Elverum	2nd	2022–23
Poland	2023–24 Superliga	Orlen Wisła Płock	Industria Kielce	8th	2010–11
Portugal	2023–24 Andebol 1	Sporting CP	FC Porto	22nd	2017–18
Romania	2023–24 Liga Națională	Dinamo București	CSM Constanța	20th	2022–23
Serbia	2023–24 Serbian Handball Super League	Vojvodina	Metaloplastika	11th	2022–23
Slovakia	2023–24 Slovenská hadzanárska extraliga	HT Tatran Prešov	MŠK Považská Bystrica	18th	2021–22
Slovenia	2023–24 Slovenian First League	Gorenje Velenje	Trimo Trebnje	5th	2020–21
Spain	2023–24 Liga ASOBAL	Barcelona	Bidasoa Irún	31st	2022–23
Sweden	2023–24 Handbollsligan	IK Sävehof	Ystads IF	8th	2020–21
Switzerland	2023–24 Swiss Handball League	Kadetten Schaffhausen	HC Kriens-Luzern	14th	2022–23
Turkey	2023–24 Turkish Handball Super League	Beşiktaş	Sakarya	17th	2021–22
