= Gugleta =

Gugleta is a Serbian surname. Notable people with the surname include:

- Aleksandar Gugleta (born 1991), Serbian handball player
- Dragan Gugleta (born 1941), Yugoslav and Serbian football manager and player
