= Finnish Handball Association =

Governing body of handball in Finland

Finnish Handball Association Finnish: Suomen Käsipalloliitto Swedish: Finlands Handbollförbund SKPL
- IOC nation: Republic of Finland (FIN)
- Sport: Handball
- Other sports: Beach handball
- Official website: www.finnhandball.net

HISTORY
- Year of formation: May 1941; 85 years ago

AFFILIATIONS
- International federation: International Handball Federation (IHF)
- IHF member since: 1946 (founder)
- Continental association: European Handball Federation
- National Olympic Committee: Finnish Olympic Committee

GOVERNING BODY
- President: Jari Henttonen

HEADQUARTERS
- Address: Valimotie 10, 00380 Helsinki
- Country: Finland
- Secretary General: Mrs. Päivi Mitrunen

The Finnish Handball Association (Finnish: Suomen Käsipalloliitto, SKPL, Swedish: Finlands Handbollförbund) is the administrative and controlling body for handball and beach handball in Republic of Finland. Founded in May 1941, SKPL is a founder member of both the European Handball Federation (EHF) and the International Handball Federation (IHF).

== Finnish national teams in European Championship ==
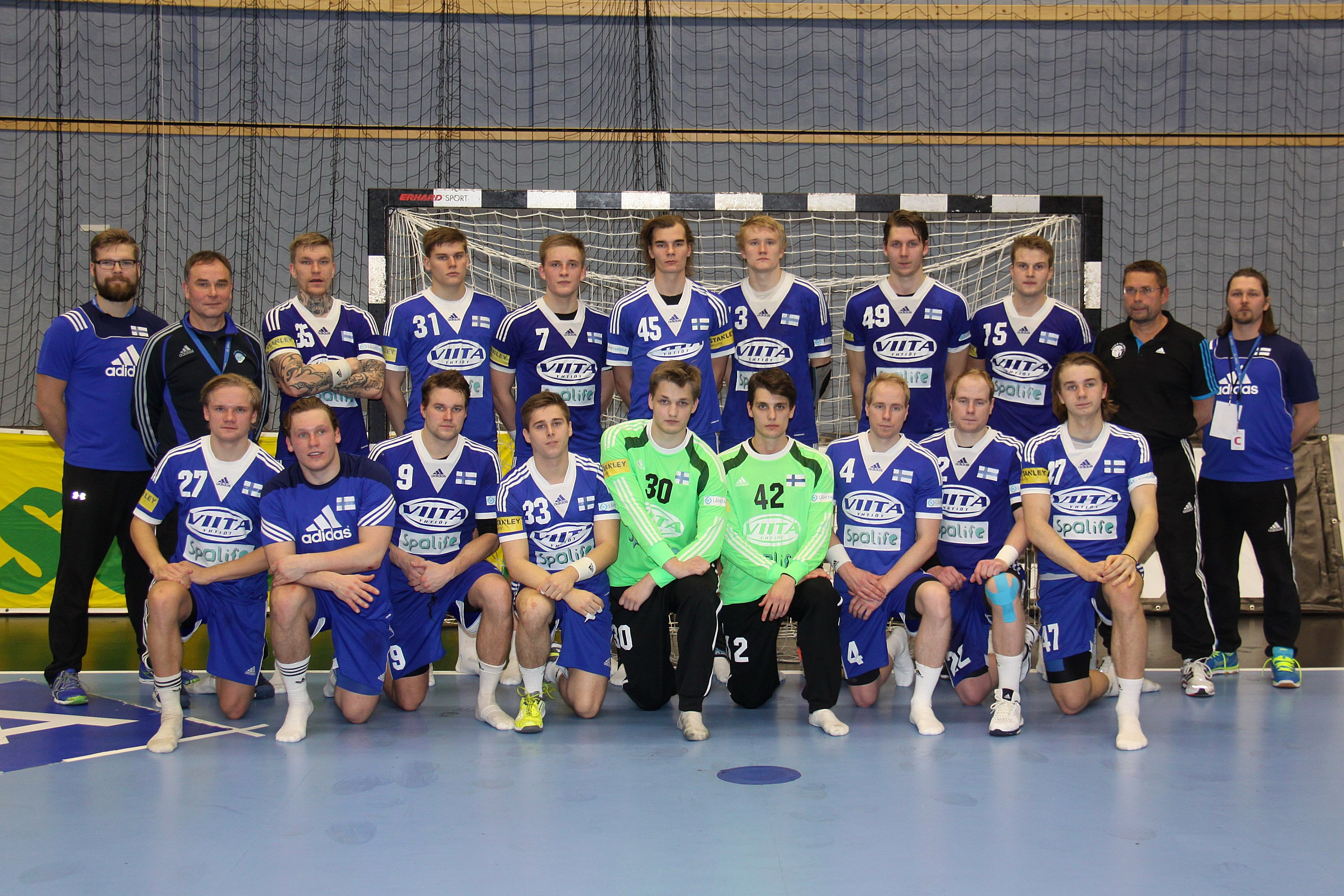
The Finland national handball team in January 2016

Tournament	Teams	Debut year	Total
Men's	Finland men's national handball team	None	-
Men's U-20	Finland Men's U-20 national handball team	2010	1
Men's U-18	Finland Men's U-18 national handball team	2008	2
Women's	Finland women's national handball team	None	-
Women's U-19	Finland women's U-19 national handball team	2002	2
Women's U-17	Finland women's U-17 national handball team	2027	1

== Competitions ==
- Finnish Handball League
