= Nico Rönnberg =

Finnish handball player (born 1992)

Personal information
- Nationality: Finnish
- Born: 14 April 1992 (age 34) Karis, Finland
- Height: 1.91 m (6 ft 3 in)

Sport
- Sport: Handball
- Position: Left back
- Current club: US Ivry

Senior clubs
- Years: Team
- –2013: ØIF Arendal
- 2013–2020: Riihimäen Cocks
- 2020: US Ivry
- 2020–: BK-46
National team
- Years: Team
- –: Finland

Nico Rönnberg (born 14 April 1992) is a Finnish handball player who plays for BK-46 and the Finnish national team.

== Achievements ==
- Finnish League:
  - Winner: 2014, 2015, 2016, 2017, 2018
- Finnish Cup:
  - Winner: 2015, 2016, 2017, 2018
- IHF Challenge Trophy:
  - Gold Medalist: 2011

== Individual awards ==
- All-Star Left Back of the IHF Challenge Trophy: 2011
