= Finland men's national handball team =

Finland

Information
- Association: Finnish Handball Association (Suomen Käsipalloliitto)
- Coach: Ola Lindgren
- Most caps: Björn Monnberg (135)

Colours
1st	2nd

Results

World Championship
- Appearances: 1 (First in 1958)
- Best result: 14th (1958)

European Championship
- Appearances: 0
- Last updated on Unknown.

The Finnish men's national handball team is the national men's handball team of Finland and is controlled by the Finnish Handball Association. Finland has participated in the finals of an international prestigious tournament just once, which happened at the 1958 World Men's Handball Championship in East Germany. There was no qualification at all for the competition in question. In addition, the Finnish national team participated in the 1955 final tournament of handball played outdoors with 11-man teams.

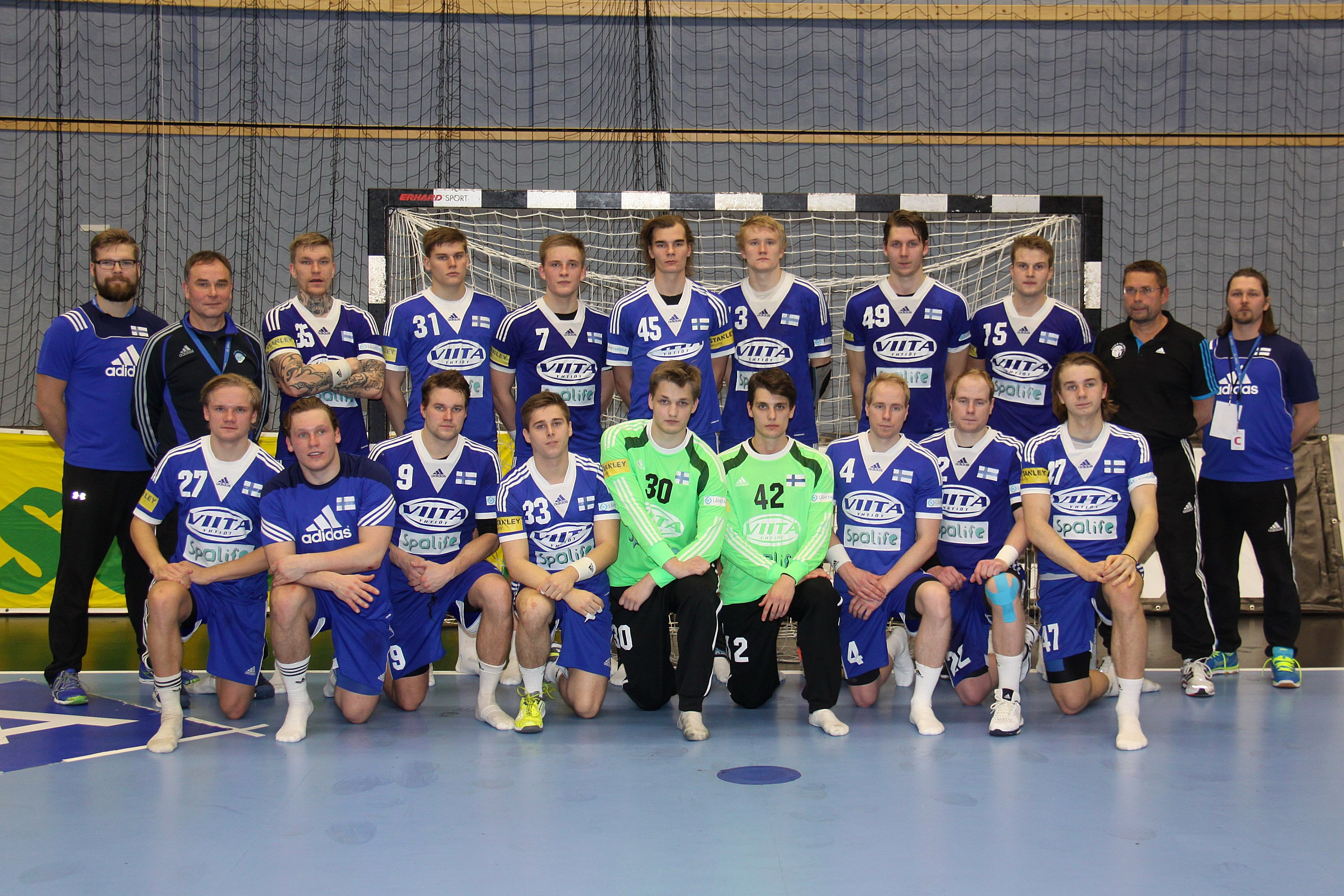
The Finland national handball team in January 2016

== World Championships record ==
World Championship record
Year	Round	Position	GP	W	D	L	GS	GA
(Nazi Germany) 1938	did not qualify							
(Sweden) 1954	did not qualify							
(East Germany) 1958	Preliminary round	14	3	0	1	2	46	60
(West Germany) 1961	did not qualify							
(Czechoslovakia) 1964	did not qualify							
(Sweden) 1967	did not qualify							
(France) 1970	did not qualify							
(East Germany) 1974	did not qualify							
(Denmark) 1978	did not qualify							
(West Germany) 1982	did not qualify							
(Switzerland) 1986	did not qualify							
(Czechoslovakia) 1990	did not qualify							
(Sweden) 1993	did not qualify							
(Iceland) 1995	did not qualify							
(Japan) 1997	did not qualify							
(Egypt) 1999	did not qualify							
(France) 2001	did not qualify							
(Portugal) 2003	did not qualify							
(Tunisia) 2005	did not qualify							
(Germany) 2007	did not qualify							
(Croatia) 2009	did not qualify							
(Sweden) 2011	did not qualify							
(Spain) 2013	did not qualify							
(Qatar) 2015	did not qualify							
(France) 2017	did not qualify							
(Denmark) / (Germany) 2019	did not qualify							
(Egypt) 2021	did not qualify							
(Poland) / (Sweden) 2023	did not qualify							
(Croatia) / (Denmark) / (Norway) 2025	did not qualify							
(Germany) 2027	did not qualify							
(France) / (Germany) 2029	TBD							
(Denmark) / (Iceland) / (Norway) 2031	TBD							
Total	1/32	–	3	0	1	2	46	60

=== European Championship ===
European Championship record								Qualification record
Year	Round	Pld	W	D	L	GF	GA	Outcome
(Portugal) 1994	Did not qualify							Group 4 4th place
(Spain) 1996	Did not qualify							Group E 3rd place
(Italy) 1998	Did not qualify							Group D 2nd place
(Croatia) 2000	Did not qualify							Group 2 4th place
(Sweden) 2002	Lost in qualifying play-off to Czech Republic							Group 2 2nd place
(Slovenia) 2004	Lost in qualifying play-off to Serbia and Montenegro							Group 3 1st place
(Switzerland) 2006	Did not qualify							Group 5 4th place
(Norway) 2008	Did not qualify							Group 4 4th place
(Austria) 2010	Did not qualify							Group 4 5th place
(Serbia) 2012	Did not qualify							Group 2 2nd place
(Denmark) 2014	Did not qualify							Group 1 2nd place
(Poland) 2016	Did not qualify							Group 7 4th place
(Croatia) 2018	Did not qualify							Group 3 4th place
(Austria) (Norway) (Sweden) 2020	Did not qualify							Group 5 4th place
(Austria) (Hungary) (Slovakia) 2022	Did not qualify							Group 7 4th place
(Germany) 2024	Did not qualify							Group 2 4th place
(Denmark) (Norway) (Sweden) 2026	Did not qualify							Group 2 3rd place
(Portugal) (Spain) (Switzerland) 2028	Future event							To be determined
Total	0/17	0	0	0	0	0	0	

=== EHF Challenge Trophy ===
- 2009 – 1st place

== Players ==
=== Current squad ===
The following players have been called up for the team within the recent months and are still available for selection.

As of 30 August 2024.

Finland men's national handball team

Goalkeepers

- 1 Joonas Klama (TuS N-Lübbecke) (Germany)
- 12 Patrik Roslander (GrIFK) (Finland)
- 16 Fredrik Parvinen (GrIFK) (Finland)
- 41 Mikael Mäkelä (Hammarby IF) (Sweden)

Left Wingers

- 2 Linus Lindberg (HK Varberg) (Sweden)
- 11 Benjamin Helander (Alingsås HK) (Sweden)
- 14 Julius Kemppainen (Riihimäki Cocks) (Finland)
- 30 Felix Karlsson (Sjundeå IF) (Finland)
- 37 Jonathan Roos (BK-46) (Finland)

Right Wingers

- 2 Jonathan Ekman (BK-46) (Finland)
- 17 Fredrik von Troil (Stralsunder HV) (Germany)
- 19 Roni Syrjälä (Dicken) (Finland)
- 23 Sebastian Säkkinen (BK-46) (Finland)
- 24 Gusten Montonen (Skånela IF) (Sweden)
- 25 Cajus Maskula (ÅIFK) (Finland)

Pivots

- 3 Kalle Kankaanpää (GrIFK) (Finland)
- 9 Viktor Grönmark (HIFK) (Finland)
- 13 Nicolas Reenpää (HIFK) (Finland)
- 22 Santeri Vainionpää (Riihimäki Cocks) (Finland)

Left Backs

- 6 Benjamin Peitsaro (Dicken) (Finland)
- 10 Þorsteinn Gauti Hjálmarsson (Fram) (Iceland)
- 18 Edward Hammarberg (HG Oftersheim/Schwetzingen) (Germany)
- 20 Robin Granlund (Eskilstuna Guif) (Sweden)
- 21 Max Granlund (Alingsås HK) (Sweden)
- 29 Anton Koskue (Dicken) (Finland)
- 34 Fredrik Karlsson (Örebro SK) (Sweden)

Central Backs

- 36 Oliver Nordlund (BK-46) (Finland)

Right Backs

- 4 Miska Henriksson (BK-46) (Finland)
- 8 Alexander Qvist (GrIFK) (Finland)
- 15 Richard Sundberg (GrIFK) (Finland)
- 33 Carl Weurlander (GrIFK) (Finland)

=== Top goalscorers ===
As of 30 August 2024.

Rank	Player	Goals	Caps	Ratio	Career
1	Mikael Källman	764	116	6.59	1982–1997
2	Björn Monnberg	566	135	4.19	1989–2005
3	Jan Rönnberg	537	82	6.55	1977–1993
4	Teemu Tamminen	433	94	4.61	2007–2021
5	Teddy Nordling	360	102	3.53	1991–2006

=== Most appearances ===
As of 30 August 2024.

Rank	Player	Caps	Goals	Career
1	Björn Monnberg	135	566	1989–2005
2	Tommi Sillanpää	119	184	1996–2013
3	Mikael Källman	116	764	1982–1997
4	Teddy Nordling	102	360	1991–2006
5	Teemu Tamminen	94	433	2007–2021
