= Aliaksandr Tsitou =

Belarusian handball player

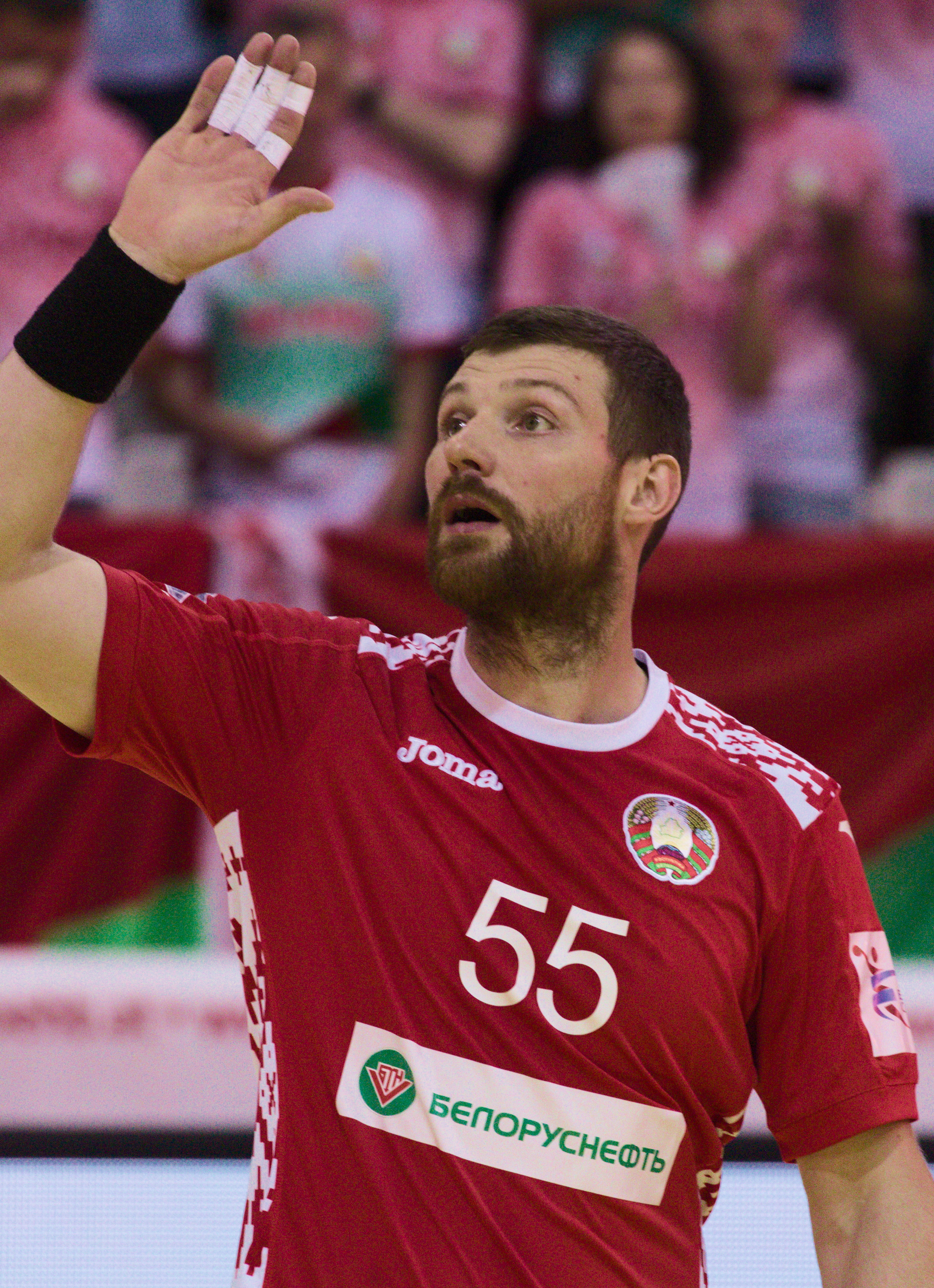

Personal information
- Nationality: Belarusian
- Born: 28 October 1986 (age 39) Mogilev, Byelorussian SSR, Soviet Union
- Height: 1.90 m (6 ft 3 in)

Sport
- Sport: Handball
- Position: Pivot
- Current club: Retired
- Number: 55

Senior clubs
- Years: Team
- -2010: SKA Minsk
- 2010-2012: HC Dinamo Minsk
- 2012-2013: SKA Minsk
- 2013-2015: HC Motor Zaporizhzhia
- 2015-2015: KS Azoty-Puławy
- 2015-2016: HC Masheka Mogilev
- 2016-2021: Riihimäki Cocks
National team
| Years | Team | Apps | (Gls) |
| 2006-2018 | Belarus | 169 | (137) |

Aliaksandr Tsitou (Belarusian: Аляксандр Цітоў, born 28 October 1986) is a Belarusian former handball player for Riihimäki Cocks and the Belarusian national team.
