= Teemu Tamminen =

Finnish handball player (born 1987)

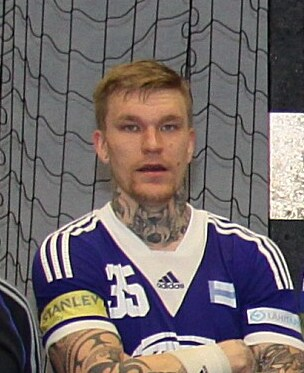
- Tamminen in 2016

Personal information
- Nationality: Finnish
- Born: 27 August 1987 (age 39) Riihimäki, Finland
- Height: 1.91 m (6 ft 3 in)

Sport
- Sport: Handball
- Position: Left wing
- Current club: Riihimäen Cocks
- Number: 15

Senior clubs
- Years: Team
- 2006–: Riihimäen Cocks
National team
Years	Team	Apps	(Gls)
2007–	Finland	71	(349)

Teemu Tamminen (born 27 August 1987) is a Finnish handball player who plays for Riihimäen Cocks and the Finnish national team. Tamminen has also been one of the most important players in the Finnish national handball team. He played for the national team for the first time in 2007, and by November 4, 2023, he has played 94 national matches, scoring 433 goals. On August 1, 2023, he leads the scoring statistics in the SM league with 3304 goals. Oak is 191 centimeters tall and weighs 90 kilograms.
