= Yury Lukyanchuk =

Belarusian handball player

Personal information
- Nationality: Belarusian
- Born: 5 January 1990 (age 36) Brest, Belarus
- Height: 1.95 m (6 ft 5 in)

Sport
- Sport: Handball
- Position: Pivot
- Current club: Riihimäki Cocks
- Number: 17
National team
Years	Team	Apps	(Gls)
–	Belarus	20	(27)

Yury Lukyanchuk (born 5 January 1990) is a Belarusian handball player for Riihimäki Cocks and the Belarusian national team.

He represented Belarus at the 2020 European Men's Handball Championship.
