= Roni Syrjälä =

Finnish handball player (born 1995)

Personal information
- Nationality: Finnish
- Born: 28 March 1995 (age 31) Riihimäki, Finland
- Height: 1.81 m (5 ft 11 in)

Sport
- Sport: Handball
- Position: Right wing
- Current club: Riihimäen Cocks
- Number: 19

Senior clubs
- Years: Team
- 2013–: Riihimäen Cocks
National team
Years	Team	Apps	(Gls)
2016–	Finland	11	(17)

Roni Syrjälä (born 28 March 1995) is a Finnish handball player who plays for Riihimäen Cocks and the Finnish national team.
