= Aleksandar Gugleta =

Serbian handball player (born 1991)

Personal information
- Nationality: Serbian
- Born: 17 July 1991 (age 35) Knin, SR Croatia, SFR Yugoslavia
- Height: 1.93 m (6 ft 4 in)

Sport
- Sport: Handball
- Position: Right wing
- Current club: Riihimäen Cocks
- Number: 77

Senior clubs
- Years: Team
- –: RK Crvenka
- 2013–2015: RK Radnički Kragujevac
- 2015–2016: RK Vojvodina
- 2016–2018: RK Metalurg Skopje
- 2019: RK Pelister
- 2019–2020: Riihimäen Cocks
- 2020–: TSV Friedberg
National team
- Years: Team
- –: Serbia
Medal record
Summer Universiade
Silver medal – second place	2015 Gwangju	Team

Aleksandar Gugleta (Serbian Cyrillic: Александар Гуглета; born 17 July 1991) is a Serbian handball player who plays for Riihimäen Cocks.

Gugleta won a silver medal with the Serbian national team at the 2015 Summer Universiade.
