= Matěj Klíma =

Czech handball player

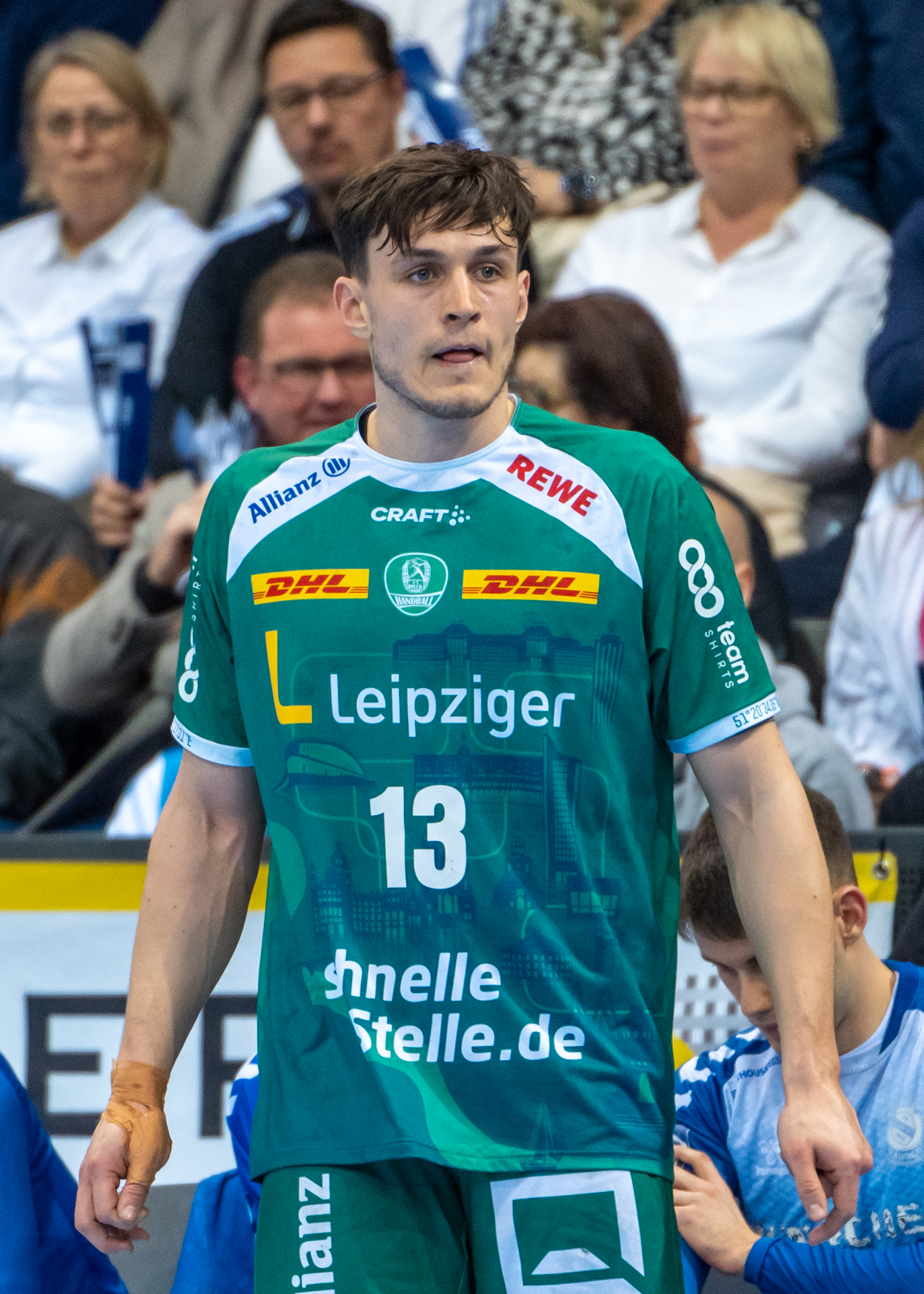

Personal information
- Nationality: Czech
- Born: 24 March 1999 (age 27) Ivančice, Czech Republic
- Height: 1.91 m (6 ft 3 in)

Sport
- Sport: Handball
- Position: Left back
- Current club: SC DHfK Leipzig Handball
- Number: 13
National team
Years	Team	Apps	(Gls)
2018–	Czech Republic	38	(162)
- Updated on 10 August 2024

Matěj Klíma (born 24 March 1999) is a Czech handball player for SC DHfK Leipzig Handball and the Czech national team.

He represented the Czech Republic at the 2020 European Men's Handball Championship.
