= Þorsteinn Gauti Hjálmarsson =

Icelandic-Finnish handball player (born 1995)

Personal information
- Nationality: Icelandic-Finnish
- Born: 8 October 1995 (age 31) Reykjavík, Iceland
- Height: 1.90 m (6 ft 3 in)

Sport
- Sport: Handball
- Position: Left back
- Current club: Fram
- Number: 11

Senior clubs
- Years: Team
- 2013: Þróttur Reykjavík
- 2015–2019: Fram
- 2019–2021: UMF Afturelding
- 2021–2025: Fram
- 2025: Sandefjord
- 2025–: Fram
National team
- Years: Team
- 2022–: Finland

Þorsteinn Gauti Hjálmarsson (born 8 October 1995) is an Icelandic-Finnish handball player who currently plays for Fram of the Icelandic top-tier Úrvalsdeild karla. In December 2022, he was called into the Finnish national handball team training group.

== Personal life ==
Þorsteinn holds a dual Icelandic-Finnish citizenship due to his paternal grandmother being born in Finland.
