= Benjamin Helander =

Finnish handball player (born 1998)

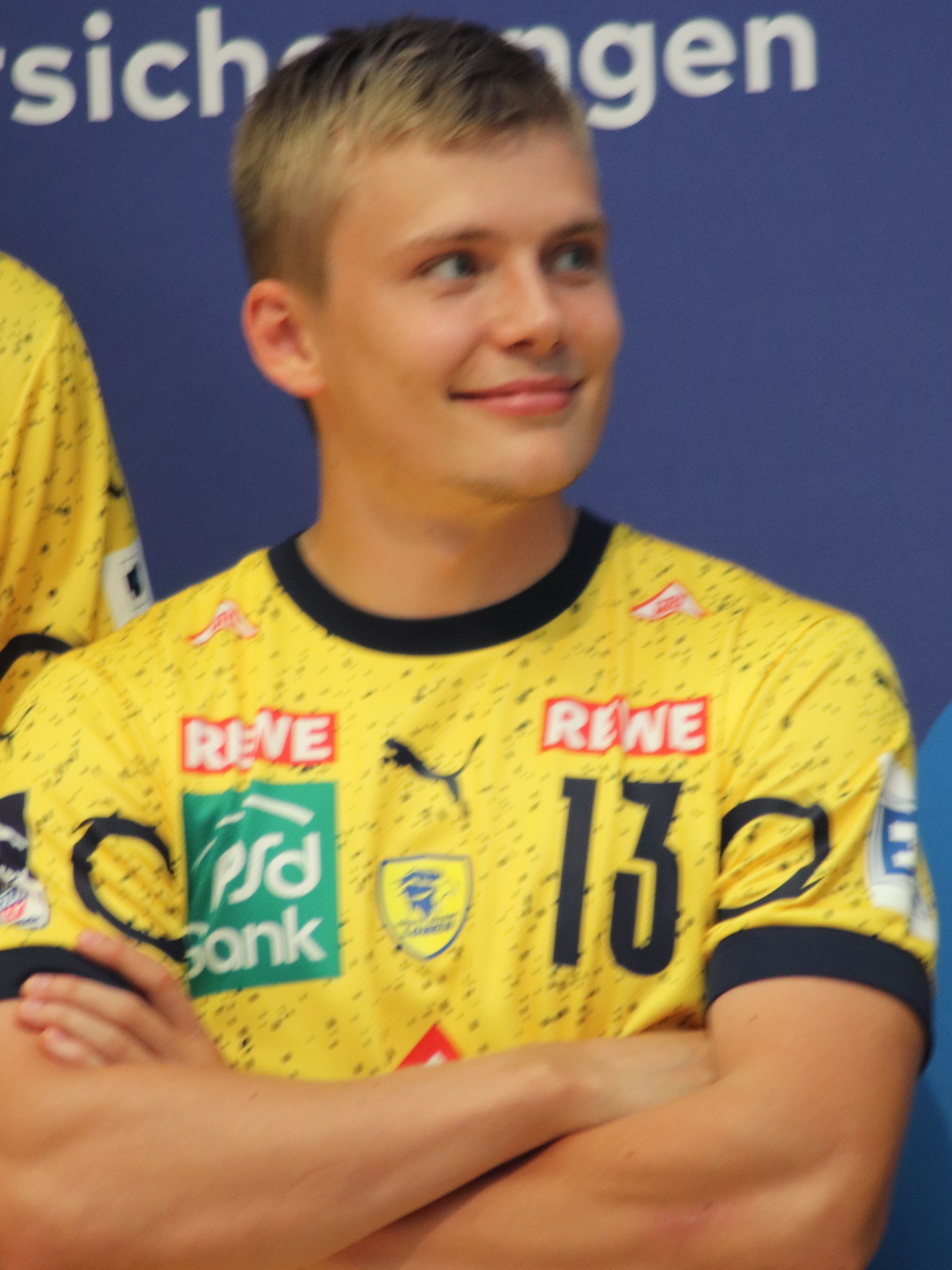

Personal information
- Nationality: Finnish
- Born: 28 September 1998 (age 28) Karis, Finland
- Height: 1.79 m (5 ft 10 in)

Sport
- Sport: Handball
- Position: Left wing
- Current club: Alingsås HK

Youth career
- Years: Team
- –2014: BK-46

Senior clubs
- Years: Team
- 2014–2017: Alingsås HK
- 2017–2018: BK-46
- 2018–2021: Alingsås HK
- 2021–2023: Rhein-Neckar Löwen
- 2023–: Alingsås HK
National team
Years	Team	Apps	(Gls)
2017–	Finland	35	(148)
- Updated on 20 July 2024

Benjamin Helander (born 28 September 1998) is a Finnish handball player for Alingsås HK and the Finnish national team.

== Career ==
He moved to Sweden when he was 16 years old to attend a handball school, and at the same time started playing for the club Alingsås HK's younger team, playing in the third league division. Because of military service, he moved back to Finland for a year in 2017/18. After that he went back to Alingsås HK, this time in Handbollsligan.

In 2021 it was announced that he's signed a contract with the German club Rhein-Neckar Löwen. With Rhein-Neckar Löwen he won the German cup 2023. Since the summer of 2023 he's back in Alingsås HK.

== Personal life ==
He is the younger brother of javelin thrower and previous handball player Oliver Helander.
