= Riihimäki Cocks =

Finnish handball club

Riihimäen Cocks
- Full name: Käsipalloseura Riihimäen Cocks
- Short name: Cocks
- Founded: 1973; 53 years ago
- Arena: Cocks Areena, Riihimäki
- Capacity: 2,500
- President: Jari Viita
- Head coach: Bojan Županjac
- League: SM-liiga
- Club colours

Riihimäki Cocks (Finnish: Riihimäen Cocks) is a Finnish professional handball club from Riihimäki. The club is playing in the Finnish Handball League (SM-liiga), and play their home matches in Cocks Areena.

Location of Riihimäki Cocks

== History ==
Riihimäki Cocks were founded in 1973 when the club decided to separate from RiPS. The newly founded team gained promotion to Finnish Handball League during the following season. The team won their first Championship medals in 1978, when the team finished second in the championship. Riihimäki Cocks got their first Finnish handball championships in 2007 and repeated the success in 2008. Cocks also won the Finnish Cup in 2007 and 2008, winning the double two times consecutively. So far, the club is a total of 12 champions and 11 cup winners.

== Crest, colours, supporters ==
=== Kit manufacturers ===
Period	Kit manufacturer
2011	(Germany) Puma
2011 - 2017	(Germany) Adidas
2017 - 2018	(Denmark) Hummel
2018 - present	(Italy) Macron

=== Kits ===
HOME
2010–11	2011–13	2013–14	2017–18

== Sports Hall information ==
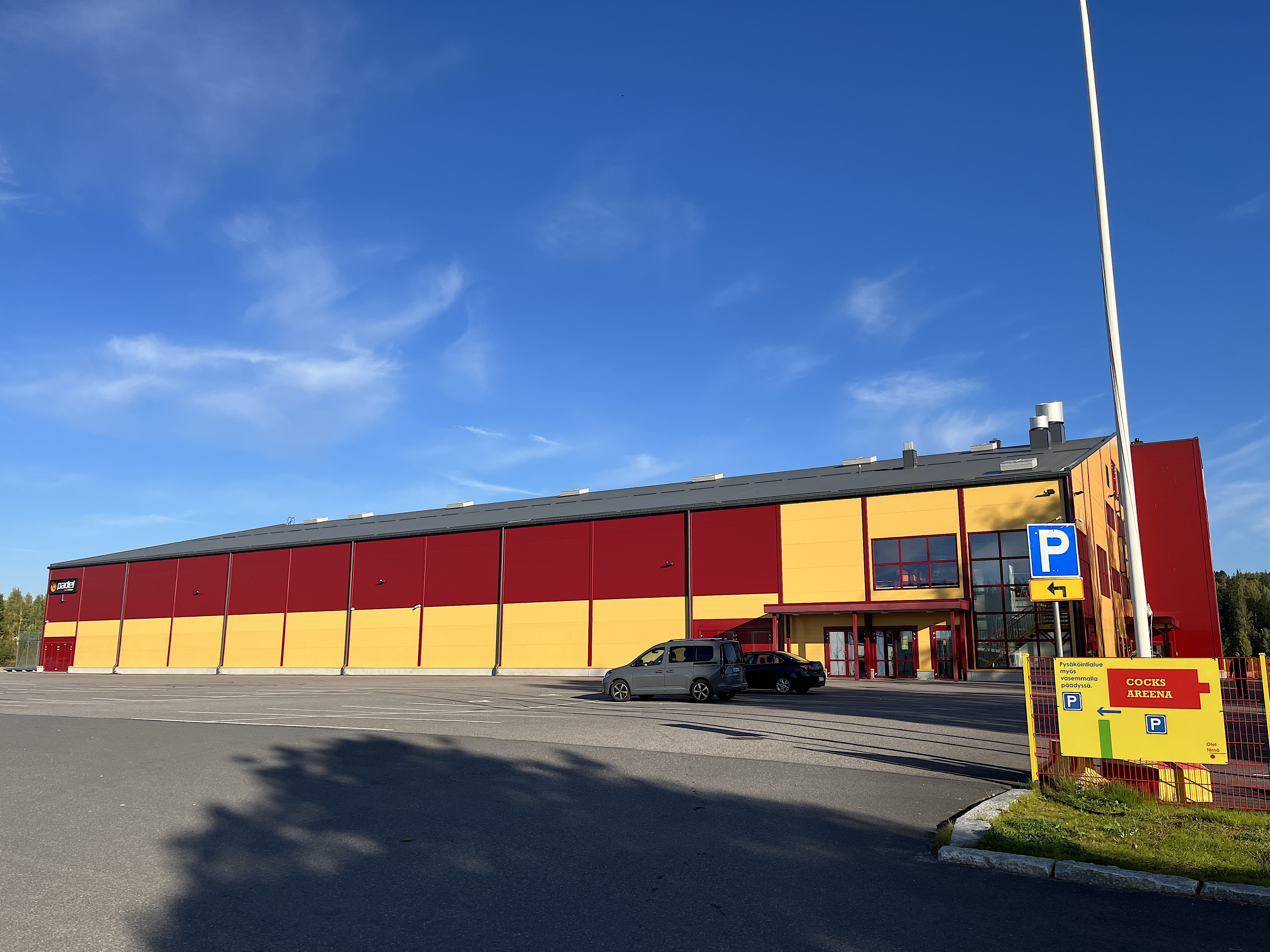
Home hall: Cocks Areena

- Arena: - Cocks Areena
- City: - Riihimäki
- Capacity: - 2500
- Address: - Hj. Elomaan katu 4, 11130 Riihimäki, Finland

== Team ==
=== Current squad ===
Squad for the 2025–26 season

Riihimäki Cocks

Goalkeepers

- 33 (Finland) Eetu Nokkala
- 35 (Finland) Eemeli Laitaharju
- 87 (Russia) Vitalii Shitsko
- (United States) / (Hungary) Benjamin Pedersen

Left Wingers

- 9 (Finland) Niko Hållman
- 15 (Finland) Teemu Tamminen
- 32 (Finland) Joona Tamminen

Right Wingers

- 11 (Finland) Daniel Tulander
- 19 (Finland) Roni Syrjälä
- 31 (Finland) Tuomas Rantanen

Line Players

- 17 (Belarus) Yury Lukyanchuk
- 25 (Finland) Santeri Vainionpää (c)
- 48 (Finland) Vertti Salminen

Left Backs

- 22 (Finland) Juuso Kangasniemi
- 36 (Finland) Aaro Koskimies
- 84 (Finland) Miika Kaukoranta

Central Backs

- 51 (Finland) Roope Ahlgren
- 55 (Sweden) Calle Almander
- 91 (Finland) Jiri Rasehorn

Right Backs

- 18 (Finland) Elias Hartikainen
- 24 (Finland) Urho Viita

=== Technical staff ===
- Head coach: (Serbia) Bojan Županjac
- Physiotherapist: (Finland) Matias Savinainen
- Physiotherapist: (Finland) Pasi Hellberg
- Team Manager: (Finland) Petteri Kiviaho
- President: (Finland) Jari Viita

=== Transfers ===
Transfers for the 2026–27 season

Joining

Leaving

- (Finland) Santeri Vainionpää (LP) to (France) US Dunkerque HB

=== Transfer History ===
Transfers for the 2025–26 season

Joining

- (Sweden) Calle Almander (CB) from (Sweden) HK Drott
- (Hungary) Soma Lukacs (LB) from (Germany) HC Burgenland
- (United States) / (Hungary) Benjamin Pedersen (GK) from (Hungary) SZESE Győr

Leaving

- (Serbia) Lazar Petrović (RB) to (Kuwait) Al Naser
- (Hungary) Gergő Miklós (GK) to (Hungary) QHB-Eger
- (Hungary) (Romania) Dániel Fekete (LB) to (Spain) AD Ciudad de Guadalajara
- (Sweden) Albin Järlstam (CB) to (Italy) Handball Sassari
- (Serbia) Davor Basaric (LP) to (Finland) Grankulla IFK
- (Finland) Julius Kemppainen (LW) to (Finland) SIF
- (Portugal) Nuno Santos (RW) to (Italy) Albatro Siracusa
- (Bosnia and Herzegovina) Kemal Hamzić (CB) to (Bosnia and Herzegovina) RK Konjuh Zivinice
- (Belarus) Pavel Duda (RB) to (Belarus) HC Masheka
- (Hungary) Soma Lukacs (LB) to (Finland) EIF

== Previous squads ==
2018–2019 Team
Shirt No	Nationality	Player	Birth Date	Position
2	Belarus	Viktar Zaitsau	27 August 1992 (age 34)	Left Back
8	Finland	André Udd	5 June 1996 (age 30)	Left Back
9	Ukraine	Oleksandr Kyrylenko	21 June 1986 (age 40)	Central Back
15	Finland	Teemu Tamminen	27 August 1987 (age 39)	Left Winger
17	Belarus	Yury Lukyanchuk	5 January 1990 (age 36)	Line Player
18	Serbia	Bojan Županjac	16 October 1983 (age 42)	Left Winger
19	Finland	Roni Syrjälä	28 March 1995 (age 31)	Right Winger
20	Russia	Andrei Novoselov	25 August 1986 (age 40)	Right Winger
22	Finland	Nico Rönnberg	14 April 1992 (age 34)	Left Back
23	Moldova	Vitalie Nenita	4 June 1987 (age 39)	Right Back
29	Bosnia and Herzegovina	Saša Puljizević	22 December 1989 (age 36)	Central Back
30	Finland	Kalle Alander	13 June 1995 (age 31)	Goalkeeper
31	Russia	Victor Kovalenko	13 January 1982 (age 44)	Central Back
32	Lithuania	Giedrius Morkunas	7 November 1987 (age 38)	Goalkeeper
33	Finland	Theo Westerlund	30 July 1996 (age 30)	Right Back
44	Serbia	Davor Basarić	3 November 1990 (age 35)	Line Player
55	Belarus	Aliaksandr Tsitou	28 October 1986 (age 39)	Line Player
87	Russia	Vitalii Shitsko	9 September 1987 (age 39)	Goalkeeper

2015–2016 Team
Shirt No	Nationality	Player	Birth Date	Position
3	Finland	Jani Tuominen	30 January 1992 (age 34)	Left Winger
4	Finland	Antti Valo	28 December 1983 (age 42)	Right Winger
5	Russia	Kiril Morozov	11 March 1988 (age 38)	Goalkeeper
7	Bosnia and Herzegovina	Mirza Mimič	11 June 1988 (age 38)	Right Back
9	Finland	Kristian Jansson	14 April 1986 (age 40)	Central Back
11	Moldova	Gheorghe Safronii	21 January 1986 (age 40)	Left Back
15	Finland	Teemu Tamminen	27 August 1987 (age 39)	Left Winger
17	Belarus	Yury Lukyanchuk	5 January 1990 (age 36)	Line Player
18	Finland	Andreas Rönnberg	27 December 1983 (age 42)	Central Back
19	Finland	Roni Syrjälä	28 March 1995 (age 31)	Right Winger
20	Russia	Andrei Novoselov	25 August 1986 (age 40)	Right Winger
21	Finland	Robin Sjöman	25 August 1992 (age 34)	Line Player
22	Finland	Nico Rönnberg	14 April 1992 (age 34)	Left Back
23	Moldova	Vitalie Nenita	4 June 1987 (age 39)	Right Back
30	Finland	Kalle Alander	13 June 1995 (age 31)	Goalkeeper
31	Russia	Victor Kovalenko	13 January 1982 (age 44)	Central Back
47	Belarus	Andrei Kaliarovich	18 August 1993 (age 33)	Left Back
85	Finland	Niko Leikama	24 September 1985 (age 41)	Left Winger
87	Russia	Vitalii Shitsko	9 September 1987 (age 39)	Goalkeeper

== Retired numbers ==
Riihimäki Cocks retired numbers
N°	Nationality	Player	Position	Tenure
4	(Finland)	Antti Valo	Right Winger	2002–2017
10	(Finland)	Markku Tuomi	Centre	1990-2002
13	(Finland)	Jarmo Lepola		
14	(Finland)	Pekka Lehtinen		

== Honours ==
- Finnish Handball League: 13
  - Gold: 2007, 2008, 2009, 2010, 2013, 2014, 2015, 2016, 2017, 2018, 2019, 2021, 2025
  - Silver: 1978, 1979, 2005, 2011, 2023
  - Bronze: 1998, 2000, 2006, 2012, 2022, 2026
- Finnish Cup of Handball: 11
  - Gold: 2007, 2008, 2010, 2011, 2013, 2015, 2016, 2017, 2018, 2019, 2023
- Baltic Handball League : 4
  - Gold: 2016, 2017, 2018, 2019
  - Silver: 2010, 2013, 2015
  - Bronze: 2014

== EHF ranking ==
As of 14/09/2026

Rank	Team	Points
172	(Romania) CSA Steaua București	15
173	(Finland) HIFK	15
174	(Iceland) IBV Vestmannaeyjar	14
175	(Finland) Riihimäki Cocks	14
176	(Hungary) PLER KC Budapest	14
177	(Austria) SG Westwien	13
178	(Turkey) Depsaş Enerji SK	13

== Former club members ==
=== Notable former players ===
- (Finland) Nico Rönnberg (2013–2020)
- (Finland) Roni Syrjälä (2012–2022)
- (Finland) Teemu Tamminen (2004–)
- (Finland) Antti Valo (2002–2017)
- (Bosnia and Herzegovina) Igor Mandić (2022–2023)
- (Belarus) Aliaksandr Bachko (2016–2018)
- (Belarus) Yury Lukyanchuk (2015–)
- (Belarus) Aliaksandr Patsykailik (2018)
- (Belarus) Evgeny Semenov (2019–2021)
- (Belarus) Aliaksandr Tsitou (2016–2021)
- (Belarus) Viktar Zaitsau (2017–2019)
- (Croatia) Nikola Kedžo (2021–2022)
- (Estonia) Marius Aleksejev (2013–2015)
- (Italy) Stefano Arcieri (2020-2021)
- (Latvia) Nils Kreicbergs (2019–2020)
- (Poland) Ignacy Bąk (2020–2021)
- (Poland) Piotr Rybski (2022–2023)
- (Romania) Mircea Muraru (2007–2009)
- (Serbia) Aleksandar Gugleta (2019–2020)
- (Serbia) Ivan Mošić (2020–2021)
- (Ukraine) Mykhaylo Krivchikov (2014–2015)

=== Former coaches ===
Seasons	Coach	Country
2001–2003	Jan Rönnberg	(Finland)
2003–2004	Pekka Peper	(Finland)
2004–2006	Markku Tuomi	(Finland)
2006–2011	Raivo Laast	(Estonia)
2011–2012	Toni Kallio	(Finland)
2012–2016	Kaj Kekki	(Finland)
2016–2020	Gintaras Savukynas	(Lithuania)
2020	Kaj Kekki	(Finland)
2020	Boris Dvoršek	(Croatia)
2021	Kaj Kekki	(Finland)
2022	Lasse Boesen	(Denmark)
2022–2023	Christophe Viennet	(France)
2023–	Bojan Županjac	(Serbia)
