= Finnish Handball League =

SM-liiga
- Current season, competition or edition: 2025–26 Finnish Handball League
- Sport: Handball
- Founded: 1943; 83 years ago
- No. of teams: 8
- Country: Finland
- Confederation: EHF
- Most recent champion: BK-46 (2026)
- Most titles: BK-46 (24 titles)
- International cups: EHF Cup; EHF Challenge Cup
- Website: https://aktialiiga.fi/miehet/

The Finnish SM-liiga is the name of the professional handball league of Finland.

== Competition format ==
The season begins with a regular season between the ten teams. The first six teams qualifies for the play-offs, the teams classified four to eight play another round-robin, while the last two plays a relegation round.

== 2025/26 season participants ==
The following 8 clubs compete in the SM-liiga during the 2025–26 season.

Team	City	Arena
BK-46	Karis	Karis Idrottshall
Riihimäki Cocks	Riihimäki	Cocks Areena
Dicken	Helsinki	Pirkkolan Palloiluhalli
Ekenäs IF	Ekenäs	Ekenäs Bollhall
GrIFK	Kauniainen	Kauniaisten Palloiluhalli
HIFK	Helsinki	Helsingin Urheilutalo
Sjundeå IF	Siuntio	Arena Siuntio-Sjundeå
ÅIFK	Turku	Samppalinnan Palloiluhalli

== SM-liiga champions ==
- 1944 : TPS Turku
- 1945 : HIFK
- 1946 : Union Helsinki
- 1950 : Union Helsinki (2)
- 1951 : HIFK (2)
- 1952 : Karhun Pojat
- 1953 : Union Helsinki (3)
- 1954 : Karhun Pojat (2)
- 1955 : Union Helsinki (4)
- 1956 : Karhun Pojat (3)
- 1957 : Union Helsinki (5)
- 1958 : Union Helsinki (6)
- 1959 : Union Helsinki (7)
- 1960 : Union Helsinki (8)
- 1961 : Arsenal Helsinki
- 1962 : Arsenal Helsinki (2)
- 1963 : Arsenal Helsinki (3)
- 1964 : Union Helsinki (9)
- 1965 : HIFK (3)
- 1966 : HIFK (4)
- 1967 : UK-51 Helsinki
- 1968 : BK-46
- 1969 : UK-51 Helsinki (2)
- 1970 : UK-51 Helsinki (3)
- 1971 : UK-51 Helsinki (4)
- 1972 : HIFK (5)
- 1973 : HIFK (6)
- 1974 : HIFK (7)
- 1975 : Sparta Helsinki
- 1976 : Sparta Helsinki (2)
- 1977 : Sparta Helsinki (3)
- 1978 : HC Kiffen
- 1979 : BK-46 (2)
- 1980 : BK-46 (3)
- 1981 : Sjundea IF
- 1982 : Sjundea IF (2)
- 1983 : BK-46 (4)
- 1984 : BK-46 (5)
- 1985 : BK-46 (6)
- 1986 : BK-46 (7)
- 1987 : BK-46 (8)
- 1988 : BK-46 (9)
- 1989 : BK-46 (10)
- 1990 : Sjundea IF (3)
- 1991 : BK-46 (11)
- 1992 : BK-46 (12)
- 1993 : Dicken
- 1994 : BK-46 (13)
- 1995 : BK-46 (14)
- 1996 : BK-46 (15)
- 1997 : BK-46 (16)
- 1998 : BK-46 (17)
- 1999 : GrIFK
- 2000 : HC Dennis
- 2001 : HC Dennis (2)
- 2002 : BK-46 (18)
- 2003 : BK-46 (19)
- 2004 : HC Dennis (3)
- 2005 : Sjundea IF (4)
- 2006 : BK-46 (20)
- 2007 : Riihimäki Cocks
- 2008 : Riihimäki Cocks (2)
- 2009 : Riihimäki Cocks (3)
- 2010 : Riihimäki Cocks (4)
- 2011 : HC West
- 2012 : HC West (2)
- 2013 : Riihimäki Cocks (5)
- 2014 : Riihimäki Cocks (6)
- 2015 : Riihimäki Cocks (7)
- 2016 : Riihimäki Cocks (8)
- 2017 : Riihimäki Cocks (9)
- 2018 : Riihimäki Cocks (10)
- 2019 : Riihimäki Cocks (11)
- 2020 : not awarded
- 2021 : Riihimäki Cocks (12)
- 2022 : BK-46 (21)
- 2023 : BK-46 (22)
- 2024 : BK-46 (23)
- 2025 : Riihimäki Cocks (13)
- 2026 : BK-46 (24)

	Club	Titles	Year
1.	BK-46	24	1968, 1979, 1980, 1983, 1984, 1985, 1986, 1987, 1988, 1989, 1991, 1992, 1994, 1995, 1996, 1997, 1998, 2002, 2003, 2006, 2022, 2023, 2024, 2026
2.	Riihimäki Cocks	13	2007, 2008, 2009, 2010, 2013, 2014, 2015, 2016, 2017, 2018, 2019, 2021, 2025
3.	Union Helsinki	9	1946, 1950, 1953, 1955, 1957, 1958, 1959, 1960, 1964
4.	HIFK	7	1945, 1951, 1965, 1966, 1972, 1973, 1974
5.	Sjundea IF	4	1981, 1982, 1990, 2005
	UK-51 Helsinki	4	1967, 1969, 1970, 1971
7.	Karhun Pojat	3	1952, 1954, 1956
	Arsenal Helsinki	3	1961, 1962, 1963
	Sparta Helsinki	3	1975, 1976, 1977
	HC Dennis	3	2000, 2001, 2004
11.	HC West	2	2011, 2012
12.	TPS Turku	1	1944
	HC Kiffen	1	1978
	Dicken	1	1993
	GrIFK	1	1999

== EHF coefficient ranking ==
For season 2017/2018, see footnote

- 19. (27) (Czech Republic) 1.liga (14.67)
- 20. (19) (Slovakia) Extraliga (11.67)
- 21. (22) (Finland) SM-liiga (11.25)
- 21. (24) (Belgium) Eerste Klasse (11.25)
- 23. (32) (Netherlands) Lotto Eredivisie (10.78)
