= BK-46 (men's handball) =

Finnish handball club

Bollklubben-46
- Full name: Bollklubben-46 Karis
- Short name: BK-46
- Founded: 1949; 77 years ago
- Arena: Karis Idrottshall, Karis
- President: Björn Siggberg
- Head coach: Jac Karlsson
- League: SM-liiga
- Club colours
Home	Away

BK-46 is a Finnish professional handball club from Karis. The club is playing in the Finnish Handball League (SM-liiga), and play their home matches in Karis Idrottshall.

Location of BK-46

== History ==
The club was founded in 1946. The handball department was founded in the club in 1949. The club was promoted to the first division in 1957. In 1966, the association won its first medal, a bronze, and in 1968 it won the Finnish championship for the first time. Due to conflicts within the association, which were rooted in the expensive trips of the handball team, the association stopped handball activities in 1974. Thanks to the active handball activists and the goodwill of the member associations of the handball association, BK-46 was able to restart the Finnish series, thus returning to the championship series in the 1976–1977 season. The team returned to the Finnish top in record time and won their second gold medal in 1979. The 1979 gold was the start of a rarely seen dominance as the club won 16 golds and three silvers in 20 seasons from 1979 to 1998. In his ranks with players such as Mikael Källman and Jan Rönnberg. The generation change in 1999 resulted in a silver medal, and in 2000 the club only finished fourth. He came second in 2001, but then won gold in 2002 and 2003, but lost the final in 2004. In 2006, however, the team became champion again. In 2007, the team won a bronze medal, but after that they were not even on the podium for many, many years. The team only became champions again in 2022. The club defended its championship title in 2023. So far, the club is a total of 22 champions and 14 cup winners.

== Crest, colours, supporters ==
=== Kits ===
HOME
2012–13	2021-23	2023-24

AWAY

2021-23

== Management ==
Position	Name
President	(Finland) Björn Siggberg
Vice President	(Finland) Kim Ahtola
Member Of The Board	(Finland) Niklas Berglund
Member Of The Board	(Finland) Mats Fagerström
Member Of The Board	(Finland) Marika Kullberg

== Team ==
=== Current squad ===
Squad for the 2023–24 season

BK-46

Goalkeepers

- 1 (Finland) Mikael Heinonen
- 12 (Finland) Fredrik Holmberg
- 16 (Finland) Niclas Zweigberg

Left Wingers

- 7 (Finland) Janne Korpimäki
- 13 (Finland) Alfons Lindqvist
- 11 (Finland) Jonathan Roos
- 17 (Finland) Ivan Roos

Right Wingers

- 22 (Finland) Sebastian Säkkinen

Line Players

- 4 (Ukraine) Ihor Skyba
- 5 (Finland) Robin Sjöman
- 8 (Finland) Roy Lindqvist

Left Backs

- 9 (Finland) Albert Löfgren
- 18 (Finland) Miska Henriksson
- 20 (Finland) Nico Rönnberg
- 23 (Finland) Liam Pråhl

Central Backs

- 10 (Finland) Jac Karlsson
- 15 (Finland) Linus Lundqvist
- 24 (Finland) Oliver Nordlund

Right Backs

- 14 (Finland) Jonathan Ekman
- 19 (Finland) Alex Lignell

=== Technical staff ===
- Head coach: (Finland) Jac Karlsson
- Coach: (Finland) Timo Oksanen
- Masseur: (Finland) Lina Koskinen-Holmqvist

=== Transfers ===
Transfers for the 2023–24 season

Joining

- (Finland) Albert Löfgren (LB) from (Finland) Ekenäs IF

Leaving

- (Finland) Rony Levén (GK) to (Finland) Sjundeå IF
- (Finland) Marcus Ojala (LB) to (Finland) Dicken
- (Finland) Linus Sjöman (LP)
- (Finland) Albert Lindholm (RW)

== Retired numbers ==
BK-46 retired numbers
N°	Nationality	Player	Position	Tenure
2	(Finland)	Jan Rönnberg	Left Back	1975–1980, 1982–1987, 1993–1998
3	(Finland)	Mikael Källman	Central Back	1980–1987, 1997–1998, 2000–2003

== Titles ==
- SM-liiga
  - Winner (22) : 1968, 1979, 1980, 1983, 1984, 1985, 1986, 1987, 1988, 1989, 1991, 1992, 1994, 1995, 1996, 1997, 1998, 2002, 2003, 2006, 2022, 2023
- Finnish Cup
  - Winner (14) : 1985, 1986, 1987, 1989, 1990, 1991, 1993, 1994, 1996, 1998, 2006, 2020, 2021, 2022

== EHF ranking ==
As of 6/12/2023

Rank	Team	Points
107	(Russia) HBC CSKA Moscow	46
108	(Slovenia) MRK Krka	45
109	(Luxembourg) Red Boys Differdange	45
110	(Finland) BK-46	44
111	(Belarus) SKA Minsk	44
112	(Germany) MT Melsungen	44
113	(Israel) Maccabi Rishon LeZion	43

== Former club members ==
=== Notable former players ===
- (Finland) Benjamin Helander (2017–2018)
- (Finland) Mikael Källman (1980–1987, 1997–1998, 2000–2003)
- (Finland) Jac Karlsson (2003–2008, 2019–)
- (Finland) Jan Rönnberg (1975–1980, 1982–1987, 1993–1998)
- (Finland) Nico Rönnberg (2020–)
