= Croatian national handball team results =

This is a list of the games played by the Croatia men's national handball team since Croatia gained independence from Yugoslavia in 1991 and their first match in 1942.

== List of matches ==
Date	Venue	Opponent	Score^{[a]}	Result	Tournament
14 September 1942	Puskás Ferenc Stadion, Budapest, Hungary	Hungary	0 : 9	L	First international appearance / FH
14 January 1991	Kutija Šibica, Zagreb, Croatia	Japan	23 : 23	D	First international appearance / RH
30 June 1991	Broadmoor World Arena, Colorado Springs, Colorado, United States	Japan	30 : 26	W	USA Cup
1 July 1991	Broadmoor World Arena, Colorado Springs, Colorado, United States	United States	22 : 23	W	USA Cup
3 July 1991	Broadmoor World Arena, Colorado Springs, Colorado, United States	Romania	22 : 23	L	USA Cup
4 July 1991	Broadmoor World Arena, Colorado Springs, Colorado, United States	Netherlands	26 : 20	W	USA Cup
5 July 1991	Broadmoor World Arena, Colorado Springs, Colorado, United States	United States	20 : 27	W	USA Cup
6 July 1991	Broadmoor World Arena, Colorado Springs, Colorado, United States	Japan	28 : 21	W	USA Cup
26 February 1992	Kutija Šibica, Zagreb, Croatia	Slovenia	21 : 18	W	Friendly match
17 March 1992	Sportzentrum Alte, Stockerau, Korneuburg, Austria	Austria	20 : 24	W	Friendly match
10 June 1992	Palasport di Enna Low, Enna, Italy	Portugal	30 : 28	W	Tournament
11 June 1992	Palasport di Enna Low, Enna, Italy	Latvia	33 : 32	W	Tournament
12 June 1992	Palasport di Enna Low, Enna, Italy	Spain	26 : 21	W	Tournament
13 June 1992	PalaLoBello, Syracuse, Italy	Italy	22 : 27	W	Tournament
10 July 1992	Walram-Sporthalle, Menden, Germany	Iceland	25 : 25	D	Interstate match
11 July 1992	Krefelder-Sporthalle, Duisburg, Germany	Iceland	24 : 24	D	Interstate match
12 July 1992	Bergisch Gladbach, Germany	Germany B	25 : 33	W	Interstate match
25 October 1992	Ballspielhalle Klagenfurt-Viktring, Klagenfurt, Austria	Italy	22 : 22	D	Alpe-Jadran tournament
25 October 1992	Ballspielhalle Klagenfurt-Viktring, Klagenfurt, Austria	Slovenia	30 : 22	W	Alpe-Jadran tournament
26 October 1992	Ballspielhalle Klagenfurt-Viktring, Klagenfurt, Austria	Austria	20 : 26	W	Alpe-Jadran tournament
25 November 1992	Porto de Mós, Portugal	Ukraine	19 : 17	W	Inter tournament
26 November 1992	Porto de Mós, Portugal	Egypt	35 : 16	W	Inter tournament
27 November 1992	Porto de Mós, Portugal	Georgia	31 : 17	W	Inter tournament
28 November 1992	Porto de Mós, Portugal	Portugal U-21	24 : 40	W	Inter tournament
29 November 1992	Porto de Mós, Portugal	Portugal	22 : 23	W	Inter tournament
17 February 1993	BSFZ Südstadt, Vienna, Austria	Austria	24 : 31	W	Friendly match
18 February 1993	BSFZ Südstadt, Vienna, Austria	Austria	25 : 23	L	Friendly match
19 February 1993	Szeged Sports Hall, Szeged, Hungary	Hungary	26 : 22	L	Friendly match
20 February 1993	Komló Sports Hall, Komló, Hungary	Hungary	24 : 20	L	Friendly match
11 April 1993	Helsinki, Finland	Finland	28 : 31	W	QR of 1994 European Championship
11 June 1993	Mate Parlov Sport Centre, Pula, Croatia	Bulgaria	28 : 19	W	QR of 1994 European Championship
13 June 1993	SD Labin, labin, Croatia	Bulgaria	17 : 27	W	QR of 1994 European Championship
20 June 1993	Nîmes, France	Tunisia	34 : 16	W	Group stage of 1993 Mediterranean Games
21 June 1993	Nîmes, France	Slovenia	24 : 18	W	Group stage of 1993 Mediterranean Games
23 June 1993	Nîmes, France	Greece	29 : 25	W	Group stage of 1993 Mediterranean Games
24 June 1993	Nîmes, France	Italy	22 : 15	W	Quarter final of 1993 Mediterranean Games
26 June 1993	Nîmes, France	Egypt	25 : 24	W	Semi final of 1993 Mediterranean Games
27 June 1993	Nîmes, France	France	26 : 19	W	Finals of 1993 Mediterranean Games
13 October 1993	Minsk, Belarus	Belarus	23 : 23	D	QR of 1994 European Championship
20 October 1993	Ásvellir, Schenker Stadium, Hafnarfjörður, Iceland	Iceland	24 : 22	L	QR of 1994 European Championship
1 December 1993	Dom Sportova, Zagreb, Croatia	Iceland	26 : 18	W	QR of 1994 European Championship
19 December 1993	Kutija Šibica, Zagreb, Croatia	Finland	30 : 15	W	QR of 1994 European Championship
12 January 1994	Dom Sportova, Zagreb, Croatia	Belarus	27 : 24	W	QR of 1994 European Championship
3 June 1994	Complexo Desportivo de Almada, Almada, Portugal	France	27 : 25	L	Group stage of 1994 European Championship
4 June 1994	Complexo Desportivo de Almada, Almada, Portugal	Germany	24 : 22	W	Group stage of 1994 European Championship
5 June 1994	Complexo Desportivo de Almada, Almada, Portugal	Russia	21 : 18	L	Group stage of 1994 European Championship
7 June 1994	Complexo Desportivo de Almada, Almada, Portugal	Romania	24 : 23	W	Group stage of 1994 European Championship
8 June 1994	Complexo Desportivo de Almada, Almada, Portugal	Belarus	21 : 29	W	Group stage of 1994 European Championship
11 June 1994	Pavilhão Rosa Mota, Porto, Portugal	Sweden	24 : 21	L	Semi-final of 1994 European Championship
12 June 1994	Pavilhão Rosa Mota, Porto, Portugal	Denmark	24 : 23	W	Third place match of 1994 European Championship
8 May 1995	Kaplakriki, Hafnarfjörður, Iceland	Slovenia	26 : 24	W	Group stage of 1995 World Championship
9 May 1995	Kaplakriki, Hafnarfjörður, Iceland	Morocco	21 : 33	W	Group stage of 1995 World Championship
11 May 1995	Kaplakriki, Hafnarfjörður, Iceland	Czech Republic	27 : 35	L	Group stage of 1995 World Championship
12 May 1995	Kaplakriki, Hafnarfjörður, Iceland	Russia	25 : 20	W	Group stage of 1995 World Championship
14 May 1995	Kaplakriki, Hafnarfjörður, Iceland	Cuba	31 : 27	W	Group stage of 1995 World Championship
16 May 1995	Digranes, Kópavogur, Iceland	Tunisia	29 : 28	W	1/8 of 1995 World Championship
17 May 1995	Kaplakriki, Hafnarfjörður, Iceland	Egypt	30 : 16	W	Quarter-final of 1995 World Championship
19 May 1995	Laugardalshöll, Reykjavík, Iceland	Sweden	28 : 25	W	Semi-final of 1995 World Championship
21 May 1995	Laugardalshöll, Reykjavík, Iceland	France	23 : 19	L	Final of 1995 World Championship
27 September 1995	Dom Sportova, Zagreb, Croatia	Austria	27 : 21	W	QR of 1996 European Championship
1 October 1995	Bruck an der Mur, Austria	Austria	24 : 29	W	QR of 1996 European Championship
2 November 1995	Trabzon 19 Mayıs Arena, Trabzon, Turkey	Turkey	23 : 27	W	QR of 1996 European Championship
5 November 1995	ŠD Metković, Metković, Croatia	Turkey	29 : 26	W	QR of 1996 European Championship
29 November 1995	Kodeljevo Hall, Ljubljana, Slovenia	Slovenia	22 : 19	L	QR of 1996 European Championship
2 December 1995	ŠD Kutina, Kutina, Croatia	Slovenia	30 : 21	W	QR of 1996 European Championship
9 January 1996	Malmö Arena, Malmö, Sweden	Egypt	26 : 22	L	Group stage of 1996 Statoil World Cup
10 January 1996	Malmö Arena, Malmö, Sweden	Russia	30 : 25	L	Group stage of 1996 Statoil World Cup
11 January 1996	Malmö Arena, Malmö, Sweden	Germany	32 : 23	L	Group stage of 1996 Statoil World Cup
24 May 1996	Quijote Arena, Ciudad Real, Spain	Hungary	30 : 27	W	Group stage of 1996 European Championship
25 May 1996	Quijote Arena, Ciudad Real, Spain	Germany	21 : 26	W	Group stage of 1996 European Championship
26 May 1996	Quijote Arena, Ciudad Real, Spain	Slovenia	26 : 22	W	Group stage of 1996 European Championship
28 May 1996	Palacio Municipal de Deportes San Pablo, Ciudad Real, Spain	Yugoslavia (Federal Republic of Yugoslavia)	27 : 24	L	Group stage of 1996 European Championship
29 May 1996	Palacio Municipal de Deportes San Pablo, Ciudad Real, Spain	Russia	21 : 28	L	Group stage of 1996 European Championship
31 May 1996	Quijote Arena, Ciudad Real, Spain	Czech Republic	27 : 25	W	Fifth place match of 1996 European Championship
29 June 1996	Baunatal, Germany	Germany	23 : 28	L	Friendly match (100th match)
24 July 1996	Georgia World Congress Center, Atlanta, United States	Switzerland	23 : 22	W	Group stage of 1996 Summer Olympics
25 July 1996	Georgia World Congress Center, Atlanta, United States	Kuwait	22 : 31	W	Group stage of 1996 Summer Olympics
27 July 1996	Georgia World Congress Center, Atlanta, United States	United States	35 : 27	W	Group stage of 1996 Summer Olympics
29 July 1996	Georgia World Congress Center, Atlanta, United States	Russia	25 : 24	W	Group stage of 1996 Summer Olympics
31 July 1996	Georgia World Congress Center, Atlanta, United States	Sweden	18 : 27	L	Group stage of 1996 Summer Olympics
2 August 1996	Georgia World Congress Center, Atlanta, United States	France	20 : 24	W	Semi-final match of 1996 Summer Olympics
4 August 1996	Georgia World Congress Center, Atlanta, United States	Sweden	26 : 27	W	Final match of 1996 Summer Olympics
8 May 1997	Palais Omnisports de Paris-Bercy, Paris, France	Egypt	26 : 25	L	Paris Tournament
9 May 1997	Palais Omnisports de Paris-Bercy, Paris, France	Czech Republic	26 : 21	W	Paris Tournament
10 May 1997	Palais Omnisports de Paris-Bercy, Paris, France	France	27 : 26	W	Paris Tournament
18 May 1997	Yatsushiro City Gym, Yatsushiro, Japan	China (Chile)	34 : 21	W	Group stage of 1997 World Championship
19 May 1997	Yatsushiro City Gym, Yatsushiro, Japan	Morocco	26 : 17	W	Group stage of 1997 World Championship
22 May 1997	Yatsushiro City Gym, Yatsushiro, Japan	Hungary	23 : 20	L	Group stage of 1997 World Championship
24 May 1997	Yatsushiro City Gym, Yatsushiro, Japan	Cuba	23 : 23	D	Group stage of 1997 World Championship
25 May 1997	Yatsushiro City Gym, Yatsushiro, Japan	Russia	31 : 20	L	Group stage of 1997 World Championship
27 May 1997	Kumamoto City Gym, Kumamoto, Japan	Spain	25 : 31	L	1/8 of 1997 World Championship
13 June 1997	Pala San Giacomo Conversano, Bari, Italy	Greece	30 : 24	W	Group stage of 1997 Mediterranean Games
15 June 1997	Pala San Giacomo Conversano, Bari, Italy	Algeria	24 : 18	L	Group stage of 1997 Mediterranean Games
19 June 1997	Pala San Giacomo Conversano, Bari, Italy	Tunisia	26 : 29	W	Quarter-final of 1997 Mediterranean Games
21 June 1997	Pala San Giacomo Conversano, Bari, Italy	Slovenia	21 : 23	W	Semi-final of 1997 Mediterranean Games
25 June 1997	Pala San Giacomo Conversano, Bari, Italy	Italy	20 : 21	W	Final of 1997 Mediterranean Games
25 September 1997	ŠD Kutina, Kutina, Croatia	Romania	29 : 21	W	QR of 1998 European Championship
28 September 1997	Sala Sporturilor "Lascăr Pană", Baia Mare, Romania	Romania	22 : 25	W	QR of 1998 European Championship
30 October 1997	(North Macedonia) Biljanini Izvori Sports Hall, Skopje, Macedonia	Macedonia (North Macedonia)	22 : 25	L	QR of 1998 European Championship
2 November 1997	SŠD Mladost, Karlovac, Croatia	Macedonia (North Macedonia)	37 : 27	W	QR of 1998 European Championship
16 November 1997	Pavilhão Flávio Sá Leite, Braga, Portugal	Portugal	19 : 18	L	QR of 1998 European Championship
29 November 1997	Dvorana Mladosti, Rijeka, Croatia	Portugal	28 : 25	W	QR of 1998 European Championship
10 March 1998	Friedrich-Ebert-Halle, Ludwigshafen, Germany	France	28 : 21	L	Group stage of Super Cup
11 March 1998	Friedrich-Ebert-Halle, Ludwigshafen, Germany	Germany	23 : 23	D	Group stage of Super Cup
13 March 1998	Europahalle, Karlsruhe, Germany	Romania	13 : 32	W	Group stage of Super Cup
29 May 1998	Meran Arena, Meran, Italy	Spain	18 : 18	D	Group stage of 1998 European Championship
31 May 1998	Meran Arena, Meran, Italy	Czech Republic	24 : 30	W	Group stage of 1998 European Championship
1 June 1998	Meran Arena, Meran, Italy	Macedonia (North Macedonia)	28 : 21	W	Group stage of 1998 European Championship
3 June 1998	PalaOnda, Bolzano, Italy	Russia	29 : 14	L	Group stage of 1998 European Championship
4 June 1998	PalaOnda, Bolzano, Italy	Hungary	27 : 28	L	Group stage of 1998 European Championship
6 June 1998	PalaOnda, Bolzano, Italy	France	30 : 28	L	Seventh place match of 1998 European Championship
24 September 1998	SŠD Mladost, Karlovac, Croatia	Belarus	32 : 28	W	QR of 1999 World Championship
27 September 1998	Minsk Sports Palace, Minsk, Belarus	Belarus	25 : 26	W	QR of 1999 World Championship
21 October 1998	Bruck an der Mur, Austria	Austria	25 : 26	W	QR of 1999 World Championship
24 October 1998	SD Labin, Labin, Croatia	Austria	30 : 21	W	QR of 1999 World Championship
26 November 1998	Kodeljevo Hall, Ljubljana, Slovenia	Slovenia	31 : 25	L	QR of 1999 World Championship
29 November 1998	Dom Sportova, Zagreb, Croatia	Slovenia	28 : 25	W	QR of 1999 World Championship
2 June 1999	Mubarak Hall, Ismailia, Egypt	Kuwait	25 : 19	W	Group stage of 1999 World Championship
3 June 1999	Mubarak Hall, Ismailia, Egypt	Norway	23 : 23	D	Group stage of 1999 World Championship
4 June 1999	Mubarak Hall, Ismailia, Egypt	Hungary	19 : 20	W	Group stage of 1999 World Championship
6 June 1999	Mubarak Hall, Ismailia, Egypt	Russia	23 : 29	L	Group stage of 1999 World Championship
7 June 1999	Mubarak Hall, Ismailia, Egypt	Nigeria	27 : 25	W	Group stage of 1999 World Championship
9 June 1999	Mubarak Hall, Ismailia, Egypt	Yugoslavia (Federal Republic of Yugoslavia)	30 : 23	L	1/8 of 1999 World Championship
8 September 1999	Sydney Olympic Park, Sydney, Australia	Egypt	25 : 24	W	QR of 2000 Summer Olympics
9 September 1999	Sydney Olympic Park, Sydney, Australia	Belarus (Belgium)	24 : 18	W	QR of 2000 Summer Olympics
10 September 1999	Sydney Olympic Park, Sydney, Australia	Japan	25 : 16	W	QR of 2000 Summer Olympics
12 September 1999	Sydney Olympic Park, Sydney, Australia	Sweden	22 : 30	L	QR of 2000 Summer Olympics
21 October 1999	Brandenburg-Halle, Frankfurt (Oder), Germany	Sweden	28 : 25	L	Group stage of Super Cup
22 October 1999	Max-Schmeling-Halle, Berlin, Germany	Germany	24 : 24	D	Group stage of Super Cup
24 October 1999	Max-Schmeling-Halle, Berlin, Germany	Germany	26 : 27	L	Final of Super Cup
21 January 2000	Dom Sportova, Zagreb, Croatia	Spain	27 : 22	L	Group stage of 2000 European Championship
22 January 2000	Dom Sportova, Zagreb, Croatia	Germany	21 : 20	W	Group stage of 2000 European Championship
23 January 2000	Dom Sportova, Zagreb, Croatia	Norway	27 : 23	W	Group stage of 2000 European Championship
25 January 2000	Dvorana Mladosti, Rijeka, Croatia	Ukraine	18 : 26	W	Group stage of 2000 European Championship
27 January 2000	Dvorana Mladosti, Rijeka, Croatia	France	26 : 26	D	Group stage of 2000 European Championship (200th match)
29 January 2000	Dom Sportova, Zagreb, Croatia	Slovenia	24 : 25	L	Fifth place match of 2000 European Championship
10 September 2000	Dvorana Valbruna, Rovinj, Croatia	Norway	25 : 22	W	Friendly match
21 December 2000	Dvorana Valbruna, Rovinj, Croatia	Kuwait	39 : 20	W	Croatia Cronet kup
22 December 2000	Dvorana Valbruna, Rovinj, Croatia	Russia	31 : 20	W	Croatia Cronet kup
23 December 2000	Dvorana Valbruna, Rovinj, Croatia	Macedonia (North Macedonia)	32 : 23	W	Croatia Cronet kup
6 January 2001	Nagykanizsa, Hungary	Hungary	27 : 25	L	Friendly match
7 January 2001	Zalaegerszeg, Hungary	Hungary	24 : 22	W	Friendly match
11 January 2001	Dom Sportova, Zagreb, Croatia	Slovenia	30 : 25	W	Friendly match
10 January 2001	Dom Sportova, Zagreb, Croatia	Slovenia	27 : 25	W	Friendly match
13 January 2001	Prague, Czech Republic	Czech Republic	30 : 28	L	Friendly match
14 January 2001	Prague, Czech Republic	Czech Republic	25 : 23	W	Friendly match
23 January 2001	Palais des sports de Besançon, Besançon, France	Greenland	25 : 15	W	Group stage of 2001 World Championship
24 January 2001	Palais des sports de Besançon, Besançon, France	United States	12 : 41	W	Group stage of 2001 World Championship
25 January 2001	Palais des sports de Besançon, Besançon, France	Germany	23 : 23	D	Group stage of 2001 World Championship
27 January 2001	Palais des sports de Besançon, Besançon, France	South Korea	33 : 38	L	Group stage of 2001 World Championship
28 January 2001	Palais des sports de Besançon, Besançon, France	Spain	27 : 32	W	Group stage of 2001 World Championship
31 January 2001	Palais des sports de Marseille, Marseille, France	Ukraine	34 : 37	L	1/8 of 2001 World Championship
29 May 2001	SD G.O.C., Čakovec, Croatia	Bosnia and Herzegovina	28 : 19	W	Friendly match
30 May 2001	SD G.O.C., Čakovec, Croatia	Bosnia and Herzegovina	21 : 18	W	Friendly match
2 June 2001	Ankara Atatürk Sport Hall, Ankara, Turkey	Turkey	26 : 32	W	Q play-offs of 2002 European Championship
9 June 2001	SD G.O.C., Čakovec, Croatia	Turkey	39 : 30	W	Q play-offs of 2002 European Championship
9 September 2001	El Menzah Sports Palace, Tunis, Tunisia	Tunisia	35 : 29	W	Group stage of 2001 Mediterranean Games
10 September 2001	El Menzah Sports Palace, Tunis, Tunisia	Algeria	25 : 23	W	Group stage of 2001 Mediterranean Games
12 September 2001	El Menzah Sports Palace, Tunis, Tunisia	Italy	32 : 25	W	Quarter-final of 2001 Mediterranean Games
13 September 2001	El Menzah Sports Palace, Tunis, Tunisia	France	32 : 26	W	Semi-final of 2001 Mediterranean Games
14 September 2001	El Menzah Sports Palace, Tunis, Tunisia	Tunisia	25 : 24	W	Final of 2001 Mediterranean Games
31 October 2001	Margon Arena, Dresden, Germany	Spain	28 : 29	W	Group stage of Super Cup
1 November 2001	Margon Arena, Dresden, Germany	Sweden	30 : 28	L	Group stage of Super Cup
3 November 2001	Erdgas Arena, Riesa, Germany	Germany	27 : 26	L	Semi-final of Super Cup
4 November 2001	Erdgas Arena, Riesa, Germany	Sweden	27 : 26	L	Third place match of Super Cup
4 January 2002	Orklahallen, Orkanger, Norway	Egypt	31 : 24	W	Elfag Cup
5 January 2002	Orklahallen, Orkanger, Norway	Norway	25 : 29	L	Elfag Cup
6 January 2002	Orklahallen, Orkanger, Norway	Iceland	29 : 23	W	Elfag Cup
8 January 2002	Dom Sportova, Zagreb, Croatia	Bosnia and Herzegovina	29 : 22	W	Friendly match
11 January 2002	Ukraine	Israel	28 : 25	W	Getman Cup
12 January 2002	Ukraine	Russia	29 : 23	W	Getman Cup
13 January 2002	Ukraine	Ukraine	32 : 23	L	Getman Cup
18 January 2002	Dvorana Valbruna, Rovinj, Croatia	RK Zamet Crotek (Croatia)	44 : 32	W	Friendly match
19 January 2002	Dvorana Valbruna, Rovinj, Croatia	Slovenia	29 : 26	W	Friendly match
20 January 2002	Dvorana Valbruna, Rovinj, Croatia	Slovenia	29 : 26	W	Friendly match
25 January 2002	Kinnarps Arena, Jönköping, Sweden	Yugoslavia (Federal Republic of Yugoslavia)	22 : 34	L	Group stage 2002 European Championship
26 January 2002	Kinnarps Arena, Jönköping, Sweden	Germany	26 : 21	L	Group stage 2002 European Championship
27 January 2002	Kinnarps Arena, Jönköping, Sweden	France	29 : 27	L	Group stage 2002 European Championship
1 June 2002	Dom Sportova, Zagreb, Croatia	Czech Republic	35 : 24	W	Q play-offs of 2003 World Championship
9 June 2002	Hala Házenkářská, Karviná, Czech Republic	Czech Republic	26 : 32	W	Q play-offs of 2003 World Championship
10 January 2003	Multipurpose hall, Viseu, Portugal	Saudi Arabia	37 : 25	W	Warm up tournament form 2003 World Championship
11 January 2003	Multipurpose hall, Viseu, Portugal	Algeria	27 : 27	D	Warm up tournament form 2003 World Championship
12 January 2003	Multipurpose hall, Viseu, Portugal	Portugal	29 : 27	W	Warm up tournament form 2003 World Championship
16 January 2003	Multipurpose hall, Viseu, Portugal	Portugal	25 : 23	W	Friendly match
20 January 2003	Madeira Tecnopolo, Funchal, Portugal	Argentina	29 : 30	L	Group stage of 2003 World Championship
21 January 2003	Madeira Tecnopolo, Funchal, Portugal	Saudi Arabia	18 : 25	W	Group stage of 2003 World Championship
23 January 2003	Madeira Tecnopolo, Funchal, Portugal	Russia	26 : 28	W	Group stage of 2003 World Championship
25 January 2003	Madeira Tecnopolo, Funchal, Portugal	France	23 : 22	W	Group stage of 2003 World Championship
26 January 2003	Madeira Tecnopolo, Funchal, Portugal	Hungary	30 : 29	W	Group stage of 2003 World Championship
29 January 2003	Rio Maior sports centre, Rio Maior, Portugal	Egypt	29 : 23	W	Main round of 2003 World Championship
30 January 2003	Rio Maior sports centre, Rio Maior, Portugal	Denmark	33 : 27	W	Main round of 2003 World Championship
1 February 2003	Pavilhão Atlântico, Lisbon, Portugal	Spain	37 : 39	W	Semi-final of 2003 World Championship
2 February 2003	Pavilhão Atlântico, Lisbon, Portugal	Germany	34 : 31	W	Final of 2003 World Championship
8 June 2003	Dvorana Valbruna, Rovinj, Croatia	RK Istraturist Umag (Croatia)	44 : 23	W	Friendly match
14 June 2003	SRC Veli Jože, Minsk, Belarus	Belarus	32 : 32	D	Q play-off of 2004 European Championship
21 June 2003	Dom Sportova, Zagreb, Croatia	Belarus	30 : 20	W	Q play-off of 2004 European Championship
24 September 2003	Denmark	Denmark	21 : 28	L	Semi-final of Scandinavian Open
25 September 2003	Denmark	Norway	25 : 27	L	Third place match of Scandinavian Open
29 October 2003	Arena Leipzig, Leipzig, Germany	France	22 : 23	W	Group stage of Super Cup
30 October 2003	Arena Leipzig, Leipzig, Germany	Spain	21 : 22	W	Group stage of Super Cup
1 November 2003	Erdgas Arena, Riesa, Germany	Germany	30 : 28	W	Semi-final of Super Cup
2 November 2003	Erdgas Arena, Riesa, Germany	Spain	21 : 24	L	Third place match of Super Cup
9 January 2004	SRC Veli Jože, Poreč, Croatia	Slovakia	29 : 27	W	Friendly match
22 January 2004	Tivoli Hall, Ljubljana, Slovenia	Spain	29 : 30	W	Group stage of 2004 European Championship
24 January 2004	Tivoli Hall, Ljubljana, Slovenia	Denmark	26 : 25	W	Group stage of 2004 European Championship
25 January 2004	Tivoli Hall, Ljubljana, Slovenia	Portugal	32 : 32	D	Group stage of 2004 European Championship
27 January 2004	Zlatorog Arena, Celje, Slovenia	Sweden	28 : 26	W	Main round of 2004 European Championship
28 January 2004	Zlatorog Arena, Celje, Slovenia	Switzerland	30 : 27	W	Main round of 2004 European Championship
29 January 2004	Zlatorog Arena, Celje, Slovenia	Russia	24 : 24	D	Main round of 2004 European Championship
31 January 2004	Tivoli Hall, Ljubljana, Slovenia	Slovenia	25 : 27	L	Semi-final of 2004 European Championship
1 February 2004	Tivoli Hall, Ljubljana, Slovenia	Denmark	27 : 31	L	Third place match of 2004 European Championship
23 May 2004	(North Macedonia) SRC Kale, Skopje, Macedonia	Macedonia (North Macedonia)	27 : 24	W	Friendly match
25 May 2004	(North Macedonia) SRC Kale, Skopje, Macedonia	Macedonia (North Macedonia)	30 : 23	L	Friendly match
14 July 2004	Mate Parlov Sport Centre, Pula, Croatia	Bosnia and Herzegovina	41 : 22	W	Friendly match
16 July 2004	Mate Parlov Sport Centre, Pula, Croatia	Bosnia and Herzegovina	32 : 22	W	Friendly match
29 July 2004	GSD Crikvenica, Crikvenica, Croatia	Norway	23 : 28	L	Friendly match
30 July 2004	GSD Crikvenica, Crikvenica, Croatia	Norway	27 : 21	W	Friendly match
5 August 2004	SDC G.O.C., Čakovec, Croatia	Hungary	29 : 21	W	Friendly match
7 August 2004	Town Sports Hall, Nagyatád, Hungary	Hungary	25 : 25	D	Friendly match
14 August 2004	Faliro Sports Pavilion Arena, Athens, Greece	Iceland	34 : 30	W	Group stage of 2004 Summer Olympics
16 August 2004	Faliro Sports Pavilion Arena, Athens, Greece	Slovenia	26 : 27	W	Group stage of 2004 Summer Olympics
18 August 2004	Faliro Sports Pavilion Arena, Athens, Greece	South Korea	29 : 26	W	Group stage of 2004 Summer Olympics
20 August 2004	Faliro Sports Pavilion Arena, Athens, Greece	Russia	25 : 26	W	Group stage of 2004 Summer Olympics
22 August 2004	Faliro Sports Pavilion Arena, Athens, Greece	Spain	30 : 22	W	Group stage of 2004 Summer Olympics
24 August 2004	Faliro Sports Pavilion Arena, Athens, Greece	Greece	33 : 27	W	Quarter-final of 2004 Summer Olympics
27 August 2004	Helliniko Olympic Indoor Arena, Athens, Greece	Hungary	33 : 31	W	Semi-final of 2004 Summer Olympics
29 August 2004	Helliniko Olympic Indoor Arena, Athens, Greece	Germany	26 : 24	W	Final of 2004 Summer Olympics
16 November 2004	Kinnarps Arena, Jönköping, Sweden	Denmark	29 : 23	L	Group stage of 2004 Statoil World Cup
17 November 2004	Kinnarps Arena, Jönköping, Sweden	Sweden	25 : 24	L	Group stage of 2004 Statoil World Cup (300th match)
18 November 2004	Kinnarps Arena, Jönköping, Sweden	Slovenia	33 : 28	L	Group stage of 2004 Statoil World Cup
9 January 2005	SŠD Umag, Umag, Croatia	Slovenia	36 : 33	W	Friendly match
15 January 2005	Dvorana Mladosti, Rijeka, Croatia	Serbia and Montenegro (Federal Republic of Yugoslavia)	33 : 31	W	Croatia Cup
21 January 2005	Salle Omnisport de Sfax, Sfax, Tunisia	Switzerland	35 : 25	W	Friendly match
23 January 2005	Salle Omnisport de Sfax, Sfax, Tunisia	Argentina	36 : 23	W	Group stage of 2005 World Championship
24 January 2005	Salle Omnisport de Sfax, Sfax, Tunisia	Japan	25 : 34	W	Group stage of 2005 World Championship
26 January 2005	Salle Omnisport de Sfax, Sfax, Tunisia	Australia	38 : 18	W	Group stage of 2005 World Championship
27 January 2005	Salle Omnisport de Sfax, Sfax, Tunisia	Spain	31 : 33	W	Group stage of 2005 World Championship
29 January 2005	Salle Omnisport de Sfax, Sfax, Tunisia	Sweden	28 : 27	W	Group stage of 2005 World Championship
31 January 2005	Salle de Nabeul, Nabeul, Tunisia	Norway	25 : 28	L	Group stage II of 2005 World Championship
1 February 2005	Salle de Nabeul, Nabeul, Tunisia	Germany	26 : 29	W	Group stage II of 2005 World Championship
3 February 2005	Salle de Nabeul, Nabeul, Tunisia	Serbia and Montenegro	24 : 23	W	Group stage II of 2005 World Championship
5 February 2005	Salle Omnisport de Radès, Radès, Tunisia	France	35 : 32	W	Semi-final of 2005 World Championship
6 February 2005	Salle Omnisport de Radès, Radès, Tunisia	Spain	40 : 34	L	Final of 2005 World Championship
11 June 2005	Krško Sports Hall, Krško, Slovenia	Slovenia	30 : 29	L	Friendly match
19 June 2005	SD Kostrena, Kostrena, Croatia	Tunisia	32 : 29	W	Friendly match
25 June 2005	Infanta Cristina Sports Hall, Almería, Spain	Egypt	24 : 22	W	Group stage of 2005 Mediterranean Games
29 June 2005	Infanta Cristina Sports Hall, Almería, Spain	Greece	33 : 25	W	Quarter-final of 2005 Mediterranean Games
30 June 2005	Infanta Cristina Sports Hall, Spain	Serbia and Montenegro	29 : 28	W	Semi-final of 2005 Mediterranean Games
2 July 2005	Infanta Cristina Sports Hall, Almería, Spain	Spain	28 : 21	L	Final of 2005 Mediterranean Games
26 October 2005	AWD-Dome, Bremen, Germany	Germany	36 : 34	W	Group stage of Super Cup
28 October 2005	AWD-Dome, Bremen, Germany	Russia	35 : 33	W	Group stage of Super Cup
29 October 2005	Gerry Weber Stadion, Halle (Westfalen), Germany	France	26 : 33	L	Semi-final of Super Cup
30 October 2005	TUI Arena, Hanover, Germany	Russia	33 : 35	L	Final of Super Cup
13 January 2006	SRC Veli Jože, Poreč, Croatia	Hungary	33 : 30	W	Croatia - Slovenia Cup
14 January 2006	SRC Veli Jože, Poreč, Croatia	Germany	25 : 31	L	Croatia - Slovenia Cup
15 January 2006	Mate Parlov Sport Centre, Pula, Croatia	Slovenia	27 : 25	W	Croatia - Slovenia Cup
26 January 2006	Wankdorfhalle, Bern, Switzerland	Portugal	24 : 21	W	Group stage of 2006 European Championship
27 January 2006	Wankdorfhalle, Bern, Switzerland	Norway	28 : 32	W	Group stage of 2006 European Championship
29 January 2006	Wankdorfhalle, Bern, Switzerland	Russia	29 : 30	L	Group stage of 2006 European Championship
30 January 2006	Kreuzbleichhalle, St. Gallen, Switzerland	Denmark	30 : 31	W	Main round of 2006 European Championship
1 February 2006	Kreuzbleichhalle, St. Gallen, Switzerland	Iceland	28 : 29	W	Main round of 2006 European Championship
2 February 2006	Kreuzbleichhalle, St. Gallen, Switzerland	Serbia and Montenegro	30 : 34	W	Main round of 2006 European Championship
4 February 2006	Hallenstadion, Zurich, Switzerland	France	29 : 23	L	Semi-final 2006 European Championship
5 February 2006	Hallenstadion, Zurich, Switzerland	Denmark	32 : 27	L	Semi-final 2006 European Championship
13 April 2006	SD Brčko, Brčko, Bosnia and Herzegovina	Serbia and Montenegro	26 : 26	D	BIH Trophy
14 April 2006	SD Brčko, Brčko, Bosnia and Herzegovina	Bosnia and Herzegovina	28 : 32	L	BIH Trophy
15 April 2006	SD Brčko, Brčko, Bosnia and Herzegovina	Macedonia (North Macedonia)	38 : 28	W	Third place match of BIH Trophy
24 October 2006	ÖVB Arena, Bremen, Germany	Denmark	33 : 34	L	Group stage of 2006 Statoil World Cup
26 October 2006	ÖVB Arena, Bremen, Germany	Serbia and Montenegro	41 : 26	W	Group stage of 2006 Statoil World Cup
26 October 2006	ÖVB Arena, Bremen, Germany	Germany	27 : 30	W	Group stage of 2006 Statoil World Cup
28 October 2006	ÖVB Arena, Bremen, Germany	Sweden	26 : 27	W	Semi-final of 2006 Statoil World Cup
29 October 2006	Helsingborg Arena, Helsingborg, Sweden	Tunisia	33 : 31	W	Final of 2006 Statoil World Cup
5 January 2007	Mate Parlov Sport Centre, Pula, Croatia	Greece	28 : 23	W	Croatia - Slovenia Cup
6 January 2007	Mate Parlov Sport Centre, Pula, Croatia	Bosnia and Herzegovina	34 : 17	W	Croatia - Slovenia Cup
7 January 2007	Arena Bonifika, Koper, Slovenia	Slovenia	32 : 29	W	Croatia - Slovenia Cup
20 January 2007	Porsche-Arena, Stuttgart, Germany	Morocco	35 : 22	W	Group stage of 2007 World Championship
21 January 2007	Porsche-Arena, Stuttgart, Germany	South Korea	23 : 41	W	Group stage of 2007 World Championship
22 January 2007	Porsche-Arena, Stuttgart, Germany	Russia	32 : 27	W	Group stage of 2007 World Championship
24 January 2007	SAP Arena, Mannheim, Germany	Denmark	26 : 28	W	Main round of 2007 World Championship
25 January 2007	SAP Arena, Mannheim, Germany	Hungary	25 : 18	W	Main round of 2007 World Championship
27 January 2007	SAP Arena, Mannheim, Germany	Czech Republic	31 : 29	W	Main round of 2007 World Championship
28 January 2007	SAP Arena, Mannheim, Germany	Spain	28 : 29	W	Main round of 2007 World Championship
30 January 2007	Kölnarena, Cologne, Germany	France	18 : 21	L	Quarter-final of 2007 World Championship
1 February 2007	Kölnarena, Cologne, Germany	Spain	27 : 35'	W	5th-8th place match of 2007 World Championship
3 February 2007	Kölnarena, Cologne, Germany	Russia	34 : 25	W	Fifth place match of 2007 World Championship
4 April 2007	Dvorana Mirza Delibašić, Sarajevo, Bosnia and Herzegovina	Bosnia and Herzegovina	25 : 28	L	Friendly match
5 April 2007	Dvorana Mirza Delibašić, Sports Hall, Ljubuški, Bosnia and Herzegovina	Bosnia and Herzegovina	24 : 37	W	Friendly match
24 October 2007	GŠD Široki Brijeg, Široki Brijeg, Bosnia and Herzegovina	Slovenia	32 : 29	W	Friendly match
26 October 2007	Arena Gripe, Split, Croatia	Slovenia	33 : 30	W	Friendly match
5 January 2008	Mate Parlov Sport Centre, Pula, Croatia	Sweden	31 : 26	W	Croatia - Slovenia Cup
6 January 2008	SRC Poreč, Poreč, Croatia	Bosnia and Herzegovina	32 : 28	W	Croatia - Slovenia Cup
17 January 2008	Stavanger Idrettshall, Stavanger, Norway	Poland	32 : 27	W	Group stage of 2008 European Championship
18 January 2008	Stavanger Idrettshall, Stavanger, Norway	Czech Republic	26 : 30	W	Group stage of 2008 European Championship
20 January 2008	Stavanger Idrettshall, Stavanger, Norway	Slovenia	29 : 23	W	Group stage of 2008 European Championship
22 January 2008	Stavanger Idrettshall, Stavanger, Norway	Denmark	20 : 30	L	Main round of 2008 European Championship
23 January 2008	Stavanger Idrettshall, Stavanger, Norway	Montenegro	34 : 26	W	Main round of 2008 European Championship
24 January 2008	Stavanger Idrettshall, Stavanger, Norway	Norway	23 : 23	D	Main round of 2008 European Championship
26 January 2008	Håkons Hall, Lillehammer, Norway	France	24 : 23	W	Semi-final of 2008 European Championship
27 January 2008	Håkons Hall, Lillehammer, Norway	Denmark	24 : 20	L	Final of 2008 European Championship
30 May 2008	Krešimir Ćosić Hall, Zadar, Croatia	Japan	37 : 22	W	Q for 2008 Summer Olympics
31 May 2008	Krešimir Ćosić Hall, Zadar, Croatia	Russia	26 : 24	W	Q for 2008 Summer Olympics
1 June 2008	Krešimir Ćosić Hall, Zadar, Croatia	Algeria	26 : 37	W	Q for 2008 Summer Olympics
22 July 2008	GSD Crikvenica, Crikvenica, Croatia	Poland	25 : 22	W	Friendly match
23 July 2008	GSD Crikvenica, Crikvenica, Croatia	Poland	24 : 31	L	Friendly match
10 August 2008	Olympic Sports Center Gymnasium, Beijing, China	Spain	31 : 29	W	Group stage of 2008 Summer Olympics
12 August 2008	Olympic Sports Center Gymnasium, Beijing, China	Brazil	14 : 33	W	Group stage of 2008 Summer Olympics
14 August 2008	Olympic Sports Center Gymnasium, Beijing, China	France	23 : 19	L	Group stage of 2008 Summer Olympics
16 August 2008	Olympic Sports Center Gymnasium, Beijing, China	Poland	24 : 27	L	Group stage of 2008 Summer Olympics
18 August 2008	Olympic Sports Center Gymnasium, Beijing, China	China	33 : 22	W	Group stage of 2008 Summer Olympics
20 August 2008	Olympic Sports Center Gymnasium, Beijing, China	Denmark	24 : 26	W	Quarter-final of 2008 Summer Olympics
22 August 2008	Beijing National Indoor Stadium, Beijing, China	France	25 : 23	L	Semi-final of 2008 Summer Olympics
24 August 2008	Beijing National Indoor Stadium, Beijing, China	Spain	29 : 35	L	Third place match of 2008 Summer Olympics
29 October 2008	Dom Sportova, Zagreb, Croatia	Finland	39 : 20	W	Q for 2010 European Championship
2 November 2008	Veszprém Aréna, Veszprém, Hungary	Hungary	30 : 28	L	Q for 2010 European Championship
28 November 2008	Stadthalle, Graz, Austria	Egypt	27 : 24	W	Interwetten Cup
29 November 2008	Stadthalle, Graz, Austria	Austria	21 : 29	W	Interwetten Cup
30 November 2008	Messe Center, Graz, Austria	Denmark	24 : 25	L	Interwetten Cup
27 December 2008	Arena Zagreb, Zagreb, Croatia	Russia	33 : 24	W	Friendly match
9 January 2009	Spaladium Arena, Split, Croatia	Slovenia	34 : 32	W	Friendly match
9 January 2009	Spaladium Arena, Split, Croatia	Slovenia	34 : 32	W	Friendly match
16 January 2009	Spaladium Arena, Split, Croatia	South Korea	27 : 26	W	Group stage of 2009 World Championship
18 January 2009	Spaladium Arena, Split, Croatia	Kuwait	21 : 40	W	Group stage of 2009 World Championship
19 January 2009	Spaladium Arena, Split, Croatia	Cuba	41 : 20	W	Group stage of 2009 World Championship
21 January 2009	Spaladium Arena, Split, Croatia	Spain	22 : 32	W	Group stage of 2009 World Championship
22 January 2009	Spaladium Arena, Split, Croatia	Sweden	30 : 26	W	Group stage of 2009 World Championship
24 January 2009	Arena Zagreb, Zagreb, Croatia	Hungary	22 : 27	W	Main round of 2009 World Championship (400th match)
25 January 2009	Arena Zagreb, Zagreb, Croatia	Slovakia	31 : 25	W	Main round of 2009 World Championship
27 January 2009	Arena Zagreb, Zagreb, Croatia	France	19 : 22	W	Main round of 2009 World Championship
30 January 2009	Arena Zagreb, Zagreb, Croatia	Poland	29 : 23	W	Semi-final of 2009 World Championship
1 February 2009	Arena Zagreb, Zagreb, Croatia	France	24 : 19	L	Final of 2009 World Championship
18 March 2009	Hlohovec Sports Hall, Hlohovec, Slovakia	Slovakia (El Salvador)	26 : 30	W	Q for 2010 European Championship
21 March 2009	Gradski vrt Hall, Osijek, Croatia	Greece	32 : 20	W	Q for 2010 European Championship
9 June 2009	Vantaa Energia Arena, Vantaa, Finland	Finland	14 : 34	W	Q for 2010 European Championship
14 June 2009	Krešimir Ćosić Hall, Zadar, Croatia	Hungary	26 : 25	W	Q for 2010 European Championship
17 June 2009	(Slovakia) Krešimir Ćosić Hall, Zadar, Croatia	Slovakia	34 : 21	W	Q for 2010 European Championship
21 June 2009	Democritus University of Thrace, Komotini, Greece	Greece	24 : 29	W	Q for 2010 European Championship
7 January 2010	Arena Nova, Wiener Neustadt, Austria	Hungary	30 : 30	D	Interwetten kup
8 January 2010	Arena Nova, Wiener Neustadt, Austria	Austria	38 : 29	W	Interwetten kup
9 January 2010	Arena Nova, Wiener Neustadt, Austria	Poland	25 : 21	W	Interwetten kup
19 January 2010	Stadthalle, Graz, Austria	Norway	25 : 23	W	Group stage of 2010 European Championship
21 January 2010	Stadthalle, Graz, Austria	Ukraine	25 : 28	W	Group stage of 2010 European Championship
23 January 2010	Stadthalle, Graz, Austria	Russia	30 : 28	W	Group stage of 2010 European Championship
25 January 2010	Stadthalle, Vienna, Austria	Iceland	26 : 26	D	Main round of 2010 European Championship
26 January 2010	Stadthalle, Vienna, Austria	Austria	26 : 23	W	Main round of 2010 European Championship
28 January 2010	Stadthalle, Vienna, Austria	Denmark	27 : 23	W	Main round of 2010 European Championship
30 January 2010	Stadthalle, Vienna, Austria	Poland	24 : 21	W	Semi-final of 2010 European Championship
31 January 2010	Stadthalle, Vienna, Austria	France	25 : 21	L	Final of 2010 European Championship
11 June 2010	Legionów Hall, Kielce, Poland	Poland	24 : 25	L	Friendly match
13 June 2010	Torwar Hall, Warsaw, Poland	Poland	24 : 19	L	Friendly match
28 October 2010	ŠSD Karlovac, Karlovac, Croatia	Romania	34 : 22	W	Q for 2012 European Championship
31 October 2010	Siemens Arena, Vilnius, Lithuania	Lithuania	19 : 21	W	Q for 2012 European Championship
8 January 2011	Stade Pierre de Coubertin, Paris, France	South Korea	27 : 24	W	Paris Tournament
9 January 2011	Stade Pierre de Coubertin, Paris, France	France	28 : 27	L	Paris Tournament
14 January 2011	Malmö Arena, Malmö, Sweden	Romania	27 : 21	W	Group stage of 2011 World Championship
16 January 2011	Färs och Frosta Sparbank Arena, Lund, Sweden	Algeria	15 : 26	W	Group stage of 2011 World Championship
17 January 2011	Malmö Arena, Malmö, Sweden	Australia	42 : 15	W	Group stage of 2011 World Championship
19 January 2011	Malmö Arena, Malmö, Sweden	Serbia	24 : 24	D	Group stage of 2011 World Championship
22 January 2011	Färs och Frosta Sparbank Arena, Lund, Sweden	Argentina	36 : 18	W	Main round of 2011 World Championship
23 January 2011	Malmö Arena, Malmö, Sweden	Sweden	29 : 25	L	Main round of 2011 World Championship
25 January 2011	Malmö Arena, Malmö, Sweden	Poland	28 : 24	L	Main round of 2011 World Championship
28 January 2011	Färs och Frosta Sparbank Arena, Lund, Sweden	Iceland	33 : 34	W	Fifth place match of 2011 World Championship
10 March 2011	Quijote Arena, Ciudad Real, Spain	Spain	24 : 26	W	Q for 2012 European Championship
13 March 2011	Spaladium Arena, Split, Croatia	Spain	23 : 21	W	Q for 2012 European Championship
8 June 2011	Polivalent Hall Drobeta, Drobeta-Turnu Severin, Romania	Romania	25 : 30	W	Q for 2012 European Championship
12 June 2011	Žatika Sport Centre, Poreč, Croatia	Lithuania	34 : 26	W	Q for 2012 European Championship
3 November 2011	Pionir Hall+, Beograd, Serbia	Czech Republic	31 : 33	L	Nations Cup
5 November 2011	Millennium Center, Vršac, Serbia	Serbia	20 : 22	L	Nations Cup
6 November 2011	Millennium Center, Vršac, Serbia	Hungary	30 : 22	W	Nations Cup
6 January 2012	Gradski vrt Hall, Osijek, Croatia	Iran	41 : 19	W	Croatia Cup
7 January 2012	Gradski vrt Hall, Osijek, Croatia	Slovakia	32 : 23	W	Croatia Cup
8 January 2012	Gradski vrt Hall, Osijek, Croatia	Sweden	29 : 24	W	Croatia Cup
16 January 2012	Millennium Center, Vršac, Serbia	Iceland	31 : 29	W	Group stage of 2012 European Championship
18 January 2012	Millennium Center, Vršac, Serbia	Slovenia	29 : 31	W	Group stage of 2012 European Championship
20 January 2012	Millennium Center, Vršac, Serbia	Norway	26 : 20	W	Group stage of 2012 European Championship
22 January 2012	Spens Sports Center, Novi Sad, Serbia	Spain	24 : 22	L	Group stage II of 2012 European Championship
24 January 2012	Spens Sports Center, Novi Sad, Serbia	France	22 : 29	W	Group stage II of 2012 European Championship
25 January 2012	Spens Sports Center, Novi Sad, Serbia	Hungary	24 : 24	D	Group stage II of 2012 European Championship
27 January 2012	Belgrade Arena, Belgrade, Serbia	Serbia	26 : 22	L	Semi-final of 2012 European Championship
29 January 2012	Belgrade Arena, Belgrade, Serbia	Spain	31 : 27	W	Third place match of 2012 European Championship
6 April 2012	Varaždin Arena, Varaždin, Croatia	Japan	36 : 22	W	Q for 2012 Summer Olympics
7 April 2012	Varaždin Arena, Varaždin, Croatia	Chile	15 : 35	W	Q for 2012 Summer Olympics
8 April 2012	Varaždin Arena, Varaždin, Croatia	Iceland	31 : 28	W	Q for 2012 Summer Olympics
8 July 2012	SRC Veli Jože, Poreč, Croatia	Sweden	31 : 25	W	Friendly match
12 July 2012	Centar Zamet, Rijeka, Croatia	Sweden	32 : 33	L	Friendly match
26 July 2012	Copper Box, London, United Kingdom	Iceland	25 : 23	W	Friendly match
29 July 2012	Copper Box, London, United Kingdom	South Korea	31 : 21	W	Group stage of 2012 Summer Olympics
31 July 2012	Copper Box, London, United Kingdom	Serbia	23 : 31	W	Group stage of 2012 Summer Olympics
2 August 2012	Copper Box, London, United Kingdom	Hungary	26 : 19	W	Group stage of 2012 Summer Olympics
4 August 2012	Copper Box, London, United Kingdom	Denmark	32 : 21	W	Group stage of 2012 Summer Olympics
6 August 2012	Copper Box, London, United Kingdom	Spain	25 : 30	W	Group stage of 2012 Summer Olympics
8 August 2012	Basketball Arena, London, United Kingdom	Tunisia	25 : 23	W	Quarter-final of 2012 Summer Olympics
10 August 2012	Basketball Arena, London, United Kingdom	France	25 : 22	L	Semi-final of 2012 Summer Olympics
12 August 2012	Basketball Arena, London, United Kingdom	Hungary	26 : 33	W	Third place match of 2012 Summer Olympics
31 October 2012	Gradski vrt Hall, Osijek, Croatia	Slovakia	25 : 21	W	Q of 2014 European Championship
3 November 2012	Sports Centre Dobele, Dobele, Latvia	Latvia	23 : 30	W	Q of 2014 European Championship
6 January 2013	Mate Parlov Sport Centre, Pula, Croatia	Norway	37 : 36	W	Friendly match
7 January 2013	ŠSD Umag, Umag, Croatia	Norway	35 : 38	L	Friendly match
12 January 2013	Caja Mágica, Madrid, Spain	Australia	36 : 13	W	Group stage of 2013 World Championship
14 January 2013	Caja Mágica, Madrid, Spain	Algeria	20 : 31	W	Group stage of 2013 World Championship
15 January 2013	Caja Mágica, Madrid, Spain	Hungary	30 : 21	W	Group stage of 2013 World Championship
17 January 2013	Caja Mágica, Madrid, Spain	Egypt	24 : 20	W	Group stage of 2013 World Championship
19 January 2013	Caja Mágica, Madrid, Spain	Spain	25 : 27	W	Group stage of 2013 World Championship
21 January 2013	Pabellón Príncipe Felipe, Zaragoza, Spain	Belarus	33 : 24	W	Round of 16 of 2013 World Championship
23 January 2013	Pabellón Príncipe Felipe, Zaragoza, Spain	France	23 : 30	W	Quarter-final of 2013 World Championship
25 January 2013	Palau Sant Jordi, Barcelona, Spain	Denmark	30 : 24	L	Semi-final of 2013 World Championship
26 January 2013	Palau Sant Jordi, Barcelona, Spain	Slovenia	26 : 31	W	Third place match of 2013 World Championship
4 April 2013	Veszprém Aréna, Veszprém, Hungary	Hungary	20 : 18	L	Q of 2014 European Championship
6 April 2013	Arena Zagreb, Zagreb, Croatia	Hungary	30 : 26	L	Q of 2014 European Championship
12 June 2013	Hant Arena, Bratislava, Slovakia	Slovakia	21 : 32	W	Q of 2014 European Championship
15 June 2013	ŠSD Umag, Umag, Croatia	Latvia	26 : 24	W	Q of 2014 European Championship
24 June 2013	Lütfullah Aksungur Sports Hall, Adana, Turkey	Turkey	32 : 26	W	Group stage of 2013 Mediterranean Games
25 June 2013	Lütfullah Aksungur Sports Hall, Adana, Turkey	Slovenia	32 : 34	L	Group stage of 2013 Mediterranean Games
26 June 2013	Lütfullah Aksungur Sports Hall, Adana, Turkey	Egypt	28 : 25	W	Group stage of 2013 Mediterranean Games
27 June 2013	Lütfullah Aksungur Sports Hall, Adana, Turkey	Greece	28 : 24	W	Group stage of 2013 Mediterranean Games
29 June 2013	Lütfullah Aksungur Sports Hall, Adana, Turkey	Italy	23 : 21	W	Semi-final of 2013 Mediterranean Games
25 June 2013	Lütfullah Aksungur Sports Hall, Adana, Turkey	Egypt	23 : 28	L	Final of 2013 Mediterranean Games
1 November 2013	Telenor Arena, Bærum, Norway	Norway	28 : 26	L	Bring Cup
2 November 2013	Telenor Arena, Bærum, Norway	Denmark	28 : 29	W	Bring Cup
3 November 2013	Telenor Arena, Bærum, Norway	France	24 : 29	L	Bring Cup
6 January 2014	ŠSD Umag, Umag, Croatia	Tunisia	31 : 24	W	Friendly match
7 January 2014	ŠSD Umag, Umag, Croatia	Tunisia	24 : 20	W	Friendly match
13 January 2014	Brøndby Hall, Brøndby, Denmark	Belarus	33 : 22	W	Group stage of 2014 European Championship
15 January 2014	Brøndby Hall, Brøndby, Denmark	Montenegro	22 : 27	W	Group stage of 2014 European Championship
17 January 2014	Brøndby Hall, Brøndby, Denmark	Sweden	25 : 24	W	Group stage of 2014 European Championship
19 January 2014	NRGi Arena, Aarhus, Denmark	France	27 : 25	L	Main round of 2014 European Championship
21 January 2014	NRGi Arena, Aarhus, Denmark	Russia	25 : 33	W	Main round of 2014 European Championship (500th match)
22 January 2014	NRGi Arena, Aarhus, Denmark	Poland	28 : 31	W	Main round of 2014 European Championship
24 January 2014	Jyske Bank Boxen, Herning, Denmark	Denmark	29 : 27	L	Semi-final of 2014 European Championship
26 January 2014	Jyske Bank Boxen, Herning, Denmark	Spain	29 : 27	L	Third place match of 2014 European Championship
5 April 2014	St. Jakobshalle, Münchenstein, Switzerland	Sweden	18 : 21	L	Swiss Cup
6 April 2014	St. Jakobshalle, Münchenstein, Switzerland	Switzerland	30 : 25	W	Third place match of Swiss Cup
6 June 2014	SK Olympic Handball Gymnasium, Seoul, South Korea	South Korea	25 : 23	L	Friendly match
8 June 2014	SK Olympic Handball Gymnasium, Seoul, South Korea	South Korea	26 : 24	W	Friendly match
30 October 2014	Dvorana Fran Galović, Koprivnica, Croatia	Netherlands (South Korea)	35 : 24	W	Q for 2016 European Championship
2 November 2014	THF Sport Hall, Çankaya, Turkey	Turkey	22 : 32	W	Q for 2016 European Championship
9 January 2015	ŠD Marija i Lina, Umag, Croatia	Serbia	35 : 28	W	Friendly match
10 January 2015	Centar Zamet, Rijeka, Croatia	Serbia	34 : 30	W	Friendly match
16 January 2015	Duhail Handball Sports Hall, Doha, Qatar	Austria	32 : 30	W	Group stage of 2015 World Championship
17 January 2015	Duhail Handball Sports Hall, Doha, Qatar	Tunisia	25 : 28	W	Group stage of 2015 World Championship
19 January 2015	Duhail Handball Sports Hall, Doha, Qatar	Iran	41 : 22	W	Group stage of 2015 World Championship
21 January 2015	Duhail Handball Sports Hall, Doha, Qatar	Macedonia (North Macedonia)	26 : 29	W	Group stage of 2015 World Championship
23 January 2015	Duhail Handball Sports Hall, Doha, Qatar	Bosnia and Herzegovina	28 : 21	W	Group stage of 2015 World Championship
25 January 2015	Ali Bin Hamad Al Attiya Arena, Doha, Qatar	Brazil	26 : 25	W	Round of 16 of 2015 World Championship
28 January 2015	Ali Bin Hamad Al Attiya Arena, Doha, Qatar	Poland	22 : 24	L	Quarter-final of 2015 World Championship
30 January 2015	Ali Bin Hamad Al Attiya Arena, Doha, Qatar	Germany	28 : 23	W	5th-8th place match of 2015 World Championship
31 January 2015	Lusail Sports Arena, Lusail, Qatar	Denmark	24 : 28	L	Fifth place match of 2015 World Championsiop
29 April 2015	DNB Arena, Stavanger, Norway	Norway	27 : 26	L	Q for 2016 European Championship
3 May 2015	Varaždin Arena, Varaždin, Croatia	Norway	31 : 25	W	Q for 2016 European Championship
10 June 2015	Fitland XL, Sittard, Netherlands	Netherlands	24 : 27	W	Q for 2016 European Championship
14 June 2015	ŠSD Umag, Umag, Croatia	Turkey	40 : 26	W	Q for 2016 European Championship
6 November 2015	ŠSD Umag, Umag, Croatia	Macedonia (North Macedonia)	29 : 21	W	Croatia Cup
8 November 2015	ŠSD Umag, Umag, Croatia	Montenegro	28 : 23	W	Croatia Cup
8 January 2016	ŠD Žeravinec, Ivanić-Grad, Croatia	Slovenia	31 : 30	W	Friendly match
9 January 2016	Arena Bonifika, Koper, Slovenia	Slovenia	17 : 32	L	Friendly match
15 January 2016	Spodek, Katowice, Poland	Belarus	27 : 21	W	Group stage of 2016 European Championship
17 January 2016	Spodek, Katowice, Poland	Norway	34 : 31	L	Group stage of 2016 European Championship
19 January 2016	Spodek, Katowice, Poland	Iceland	37 : 28	W	Group stage of 2016 European Championship
21 January 2016	Tauron Arena, Kraków, Poland	Macedonia (North Macedonia)	24 : 34	W	Main round of 2016 European Championship
23 January 2016	Tauron Arena, Kraków, Poland	France	32 : 24	L	Main round of 2016 European Championship
27 January 2016	Tauron Arena, Kraków, Poland	Poland	23 : 37	W	Main round of 2016 European Championship
29 January 2016	Tauron Arena, Kraków, Poland	Spain	33 : 29	L	Semi-final of 2016 European Championship
31 January 2016	Tauron Arena, Kraków, Poland	Norway	24 : 31	W	Third place match of 2016 European Championship
8 April 2016	Jyske Bank Boxen, Herning, Denmark	Denmark	28 : 24	L	Q of 2016 Summer Olympics
9 April 2016	Jyske Bank Boxen, Herning, Denmark	Bahrain	33 : 22	W	Q of 2016 Summer Olympics
10 April 2016	Jyske Bank Boxen, Herning, Denmark	Norway	27 : 21	W	Q of 2016 Summer Olympics
14 July 2016	Spaladium Arena, Split, Croatia	Sweden	26 : 24	W	Friendly match
16 July 2016	Krešimir Ćosić Hall, Zadar, Croatia	Sweden	25 : 25	D	Friendly match
22 July 2016	Arena Bonifika, Koper, Slovenia	Slovenia	25 : 27	L	Friendly match
26 July 2016	SD Marino Cvetković, Opatija, Croatia	Slovenia	22 : 20	W	Friendly match
7 August 2016	Future Arena, Rio de Janeiro, Brazil	Qatar	23 : 30	L	Group stage of 2016 Summer Olympics
9 August 2016	Future Arena, Rio de Janeiro, Brazil	Argentina	26 : 27	W	Group stage of 2016 Summer Olympics
11 August 2016	Future Arena, Rio de Janeiro, Brazil	Denmark	24 : 27	W	Group stage of 2016 Summer Olympics
13 August 2016	Future Arena, Rio de Janeiro, Brazil	France	29 : 28	W	Group stage of 2016 Summer Olympics
15 August 2016	Future Arena, Rio de Janeiro, Brazil	Tunisia	41 : 26	W	Group stage of 2016 Summer Olympics
17 August 2016	Future Arena, Rio de Janeiro, Brazil	Poland	27 : 30	L	Quarter-final of 2016 Summer Olympics
4 November 2016	Dvorana Marije i Line, Umag, Croatia	PPD Zagreb (Croatia)	26 : 20	L	Friendly match
8 January 2017	Dvorana Marije i Line, Umag, Croatia	Tunis (Tunisia)	35 : 30	W	HEP Croatia Cup
9 January 2017	Dvorana Marije i Line, Umag, Croatia	Montenegro	24 : 22	W	HEP Croatia Cup
13 January 2017	Kindarena, Rouen, France	Saudi Arabia	28 : 23	W	Group stage of 2017 World Championship
14 January 2017	Kindarena, Rouen, France	Hungary	28 : 31	W	Group stage of 2017 World Championship
16 January 2017	Kindarena, Rouen, France	Belarus	31 : 25	W	Group stage of 2017 World Championship
18 January 2017	Kindarena, Rouen, France	Chile	37 : 22	W	Group stage of 2017 World Championship
20 January 2017	Kindarena, Rouen, France	Germany	28:21	L	Group stage of 2017 World Championship
22 January 2017	Park&Suites Arena, Montpellier, France	Egypt	21:19	W	Round of 16 of 2017 World Championship
24 January 2017	Park&Suites Arena, Montpellier, France	Spain	29:30	W	Quarter final of 2017 World Championship
27 January 2017	AccorHotels Arena, Paris, France	Norway	25:28	L	Semi final of 2017 World Championship
28 January 2017	AccorHotels Arena, Paris, France	Slovenia	31:30	L	Third place match of 2017 World Championship
26 October 2017	Arena Stožice, Ljubljana, Slovenia	Slovenia	26:26	D	Friendly match
5 January 2018	Spaladium Arena, Split, Croatia	Montenegro	25:22	W	Friendly match
12 January 2018	Spaladium Arena, Split, Croatia	Serbia	32:22	W	Group stage at 2018 European Championship
14 January 2018	Spaladium Arena, Split, Croatia	Iceland	22:29	W	Group stage at 2018 European Championship
16 January 2018	Spaladium Arena, Split, Croatia	Sweden	31:35	L	Group stage at 2018 European Championship
18 January 2018	Arena Zagreb, Zagreb, Croatia	Belarus	25:23	W	Main round at 2018 European Championship
20 January 2018	Arena Zagreb, Zagreb, Croatia	Norway	32:28	W	Main round at 2018 European Championship
24 January 2018	Arena Zagreb, Zagreb, Croatia	France	27:30	L	Main round at 2018 European Championship
26 January 2018	Arena Zagreb, Zagreb, Croatia	Czech Republic	28:27	W	Fifth place match at 2018 European Championship
5 April 2018	Stiga Sports Arena, Eskilstuna, Sweden	Sweden	25:32	L	Friendly match
7 April 2018	Stadium Arena, Norrköping, Sweden	Sweden	29:28	W	Friendly match
9 June 2018	Gradski vrt, Osijek, Croatia	Montenegro	32:19	W	Q play-offs of 2019 World Championship
14 June 2018	Morača Sports Centre, Podgorica, Montenegro	Montenegro	32 : 31	L	Q play-offs of 2019 World Championship
23 June 2018	Campclar Sports Palace, Tarragona, Spain	Italy	30 : 26	W	Group stage of 2018 Mediterranean Games
24 June 2018	Campclar Sports Palace, Tarragona, Spain	Algeria	37 : 26	W	Group stage of 2018 Mediterranean Games
27 June 2018	Campclar Sports Palace, Tarragona, Spain	Slovenia	17 : 16	W	Quarter final of 2018 Mediterranean Games
29 June 2018	Campclar Sports Palace, Tarragona, Spain	Spain	31 : 29	W	Semi final of 2018 Mediterranean Games
1 July 2018	Campclar Sports Palace, Tarragona, Spain	Tunisia	24 : 23	W	Final of 2018 Mediterranean Games
25 October 2018	Gradski vrt, Osijek, Croatia	Switzerland	31 : 28	W	Q for 2020 European Championship
28 October 2018	Sportoase Philipssite, Leuven, Belgium	Belgium	30 : 25	W	Q for 2020 European Championship
4 January 2019	Žatika Sports Arena, Poreč, Croatia	Montenegro	34 : 22	W	HEP Croatia Cup
5 January 2019	Žatika Sports Arena, Poreč, Croatia	Italy	28:20	W	HEP Croatia Cup
11 January 2019	Olympiahalle, Munich, Germany	Iceland	31:27	W	Group stage of 2019 World Championship
13 January 2019	Olympiahalle, Munich, Germany	Japan	35:27	W	Group stage of 2019 World Championship
14 January 2019	Olympiahalle, Munich, Germany	North Macedonia	31:22	W	Group stage of 2019 World Championship
16 January 2019	Olympiahalle, Munich, Germany	Bahrain	32:20	W	Group stage of 2019 World Championship
17 January 2019	Olympiahalle, Munich, Germany	Spain	23:19	W	Group stage of 2019 World Championship
20 January 2019	Lanxess Arena, Cologne, Germany	Brazil	26:29	L	Main round of 2019 World Championship
21 January 2019	Lanxess Arena, Cologne, Germany	Germany	21:22	L	Main round of 2019 World Championship
23 January 2019	Lanxess Arena, Cologne, Germany	France	23:20	W	Main round of 2019 World Championship
26 January 2019	(Germany) Jyske Bank Boxen, Herning, Denmark	Sweden	28:34	L	Fifth place match of 2019 World Championship
11 April 2019	Stark Arena, Belgrade, Serbia	Serbia	25:25	D	Q for 2020 European Championship
14 April 2019	Kresimir Cosic Hall, Zadar, Croatia	Serbia	27:23	W	Q for 2020 European Championship
12 June 2019	Bossard Arena, Zug, Switzerland	Switzerland	33:28	W	Q for 2020 European Championship
16 June 2019	Zatika Sport Centre, Poreč, Croatia	Belgium	28:19	W	Q for 2020 European Championship
23 October 2019	Arena Zagreb, Zagreb, Croatia	Germany	25:26	L	Friendly match
26 October 2019	ZAG-Arena, Hanover, Germany	Germany	23:24	L	Friendly match
4 January 2020	Zatika Sport Centre, Poreč, Croatia	Bosnia and Herzegovina	33:33	D	HEP Croatia Cup
5 January 2020	Zatika Sport Centre, Poreč, Croatia	Qatar	33:28	W	HEP Croatia Cup (600th match)
9 January 2020	Messe Congress Graz, Graz, Austria	Montenegro	27:21	W	Group stage at 2020 European Championship
11 January 2020	Messe Congress Graz, Graz, Austria	Belarus	31:23	W	Group stage at 2020 European Championship
13 January 2020	Messe Congress Graz, Graz, Austria	Serbia	24:21	W	Group stage at 2020 European Championship
16 January 2020	Wiener Stadthalle, Vienna, Austria	Austria	27:23	W	Main round at 2020 European Championship
18 January 2020	Wiener Stadthalle, Vienna, Austria	Germany	25:24	W	Main round at 2020 European Championship
20 January 2020	Wiener Stadthalle, Vienna, Austria	Czech Republic	22:21	W	Main round at 2020 European Championship
22 January 2020	Wiener Stadthalle, Vienna, Austria	Spain	22:22	D	Main round at 2020 European Championship
24 January 2020	Tele2 Arena, Stockholm, Sweden	Norway	29:28 (ET)	W	Semi-final of 2020 European Championship
26 January 2020	Tele2 Arena, Stockholm, Sweden	Spain	20:22	L	Final of 2020 European Championship
7 November 2020	Gradski vrt Hall, Osijek, Croatia	Hungary	31:27	W	EHF Euro Cup
5 January 2021	Zatika Sport Centre, Poreč, Croatia	Spain	31:28	W	EHF Euro Cup
15 January 2021	Borg Al Arab Sports Hall, Alexandria, Egypt	Japan	29:29	D	Group stage of 2021 World Championship
17 January 2021	Borg Al Arab Sports Hall, Alexandria, Egypt	Angola	28:20	W	Group stage of 2021 World Championship
19 January 2021	Borg Al Arab Sports Hall, Alexandria, Egypt	Qatar	26:24	W	Group stage of 2021 World Championship
21 January 2021	Covered Halls Complex, Cairo, Egypt	Bahrain	28:18	W	Main round of 2021 World Championship
23 January 2021	Covered Halls Complex, Cairo, Egypt	Argentina	19:23	L	Main round of 2021 World Championship
25 January 2021	Covered Halls Complex, Cairo, Egypt	Denmark	26:38	L	Main round of 2021 World Championship
12 March 2021	Sud de France Arena, Montpellier, France	France	26:30	L	Q of 2020 Summer Olympics
13 March 2021	Sud de France Arena, Montpellier, France	Portugal	25:24	W	Q of 2020 Summer Olympics
14 March 2021	Sud de France Arena, Montpellier, France	Tunisia	30:26	W	Q of 2020 Summer Olympics
28 April 2021	Varaždin Arena, Varaždin, Croatia	Slovakia	32:24	W	EHF Euro Cup
29 April 2021	Varaždin Arena, Varaždin, Croatia	Slovakia	26:23	W	EHF Euro Cup
1 May 2021	Veszprém Arena, Veszprém, Hungary	Hungary	22:26	L	EHF Euro Cup
27 June 2021	Pontevedra Municipal Sports Hall, Pontevedra, Spain	Spain	22:34	L	EHF Euro Cup
6 November 2021	Novigrad Sport Hall, Novigrad, Croatia	Slovenia	34:31	W	Friendly match
29 December 2021	Zlatorog Arena, Celje, Slovenia	Slovenia	26:33	L	Friendly match
7 January 2022	Gradski vrt Hall, Osijek, Croatia	Russia	30:24	W	HEP Croatia Cup
8 January 2022	Gradski vrt Hall, Osijek, Croatia	Russia	26:28	L	HEP Croatia Cup
13 January 2022	Pick Arena, Szeged, Hungary	France	22:27	L	Group stage at 2022 European Championship
15 January 2022	Pick Arena, Szeged, Hungary	Serbia	23:20	W	Group stage at 2022 European Championship
17 January 2022	Pick Arena, Szeged, Hungary	Ukraine	38:25	W	Group stage at 2022 European Championship
20 January 2022	MVM Dome, Budapest, Hungary	Montenegro	26:32	L	Main round at 2022 European Championship
22 January 2022	MVM Dome, Budapest, Hungary	Denmark	25:27	L	Main round at 2022 European Championship
24 January 2022	MVM Dome, Budapest, Hungary	Iceland	23:22	W	Main round at 2022 European Championship
26 January 2022	MVM Dome, Budapest, Hungary	Netherlands	28:28	D	Main round at 2022 European Championship
13 April 2022	Energia Areena, Vantaa, Finland	Finland	34:21	W	Q for 2023 World Championship
16 April 2022	Varaždin Arena, Varaždin, Croatia	Finland	36:22	W	Q for 2023 World Championship
12 October 2022	Varaždin Arena, Varaždin, Croatia	Greece	33:25	W	Q for 2024 European Championship
16 October 2022	Sporthal Alverberg, Hasselt, Belgium	Belgium	30:27	W	Q for 2024 European Championship
29 December 2022	Mate Parlov Sport Centre, Pula, Croatia	Italy	40:26	W	Friendly match
6 January 2023	Zatika Sport Centre, Poreč, Croatia	North Macedonia	40:34	W	HEP Croatia Cup
8 January 2023	Zatika Sport Centre, Poreč, Croatia	Israel	37:23	W	HEP Croatia Cup
13 January 2023	Husqvarna Garden, Jönköping, Sweden	Egypt	22:31	L	Group stage of 2023 World Championship
15 January 2023	Husqvarna Garden, Jönköping, Sweden	United States	40:22	W	Group stage of 2023 World Championship
17 January 2023	Husqvarna Garden, Jönköping, Sweden	Morocco	36:24	W	Group stage of 2023 World Championship
19 January 2023	Malmö Arena, Malmö, Sweden	Denmark	32:32	D	Main round of 2023 World Championship
21 January 2023	Malmö Arena, Malmö, Sweden	Belgium	34:26	W	Main round of 2023 World Championship
23 January 2023	Malmö Arena, Malmö, Sweden	Bahrain	43:32	W	Main round of 2023 World Championship
8 March 2023	Indoor-Sportcentrum Eindhoven, Eindhoven, Netherlands	Netherlands	27:32	L	Q for 2024 European Championship
12 March 2023	Gradski vrt Hall, Osijek, Croatia	Netherlands	25:25	D	Q for 2024 European Championship
26 April 2023	Tasos Kampouris Kanithou Indoor Hall, Chalcis, Greece	Greece	31:26	W	Q for 2024 European Championship
30 April 2023	Centar Zamet, Rijeka, Croatia	Belgium	34:29	W	Q for 2024 European Championship
4 January 2024	Žatika Sport Centre, Poreč, Croatia	Montenegro	29 : 25	W	Croatia Cup
6 January 2024	Žatika Sport Centre, Poreč, Croatia	Slovenia	32 : 26	W	Croatia Cup
12 January 2024	SAP Arena, Mannheim, Germany	Spain	39 : 29	W	Preliminary round at 2024 European Championship
14 January 2024	SAP Arena, Mannheim, Germany	Austria	28 : 28	D	Preliminary round at 2024 European Championship
16 January 2024	SAP Arena, Mannheim, Germany	Romania	31 : 25	W	Preliminary round at 2024 European Championship
18 January 2024	Lanxess Arena, Cologne, Germany	France	32 : 34	L	Main round at 2024 European Championship
20 January 2024	Lanxess Arena, Cologne, Germany	Hungary	26 : 29	L	Main round at 2024 European Championship
22 January 2024	Lanxess Arena, Cologne, Germany	Iceland	30 : 35	L	Main round at 2024 European Championship
24 January 2024	Lanxess Arena, Cologne, Germany	Germany	30 : 24	W	Main round at 2024 European Championship
14 March 2024	ZAG-Arena, Hanover, Germany	Austria	35 : 29	W	Q of 2024 Summer Olympics
16 March 2024	ZAG-Arena, Hanover, Germany	Germany	33 : 30	W	Q of 2024 Summer Olympics
17 March 2024	ZAG-Arena, Hanover, Germany	Algeria	34 : 22	W	Q of 2024 Summer Olympics
9 May 2024	Jordal Amfi, Oslo, Norway	Norway	26 : 32	L	Gjensidige Cup
11 May 2024	Jordal Amfi, Oslo, Norway	Argentina	20 : 19	W	Gjensidige Cup
12 May 2024	Jordal Amfi, Oslo, Norway	Denmark	22 : 37	L	Gjensidige Cup
6 July 2024	Varaždin Arena, Varaždin, Croatia	Egypt	36 : 29	W	Friendly match
17 July 2024	Halle Jean-Cochet, Chartres, France	France	26 : 31	L	Friendly match
27 July 2024	Paris Expo Porte de Versailles, Paris, France	Japan	30 : 29	W	Group stage of 2024 Summer Olympics
29 July 2024	Paris Expo Porte de Versailles, Paris, France	Slovenia	29 : 31	L	Group stage of 2024 Summer Olympics
31 July 2024	Paris Expo Porte de Versailles, Paris, France	Germany	31 : 26	W	Group stage of 2024 Summer Olympics
2 August 2024	Paris Expo Porte de Versailles, Paris, France	Sweden	27 : 38	L	Group stage of 2024 Summer Olympics
4 August 2024	Paris Expo Porte de Versailles, Paris, France	Spain	31 : 32	L	Group stage of 2024 Summer Olympics
7 November 2024	Varaždin Arena, Varaždin, Croatia	Belgium	30 : 23	W	Q for 2026 European Championship
9 November 2024	d'Coque, Luxembourg, Luxembourg	Luxembourg	35 : 25	W	Q for 2026 European Championship
29 December 2024	Žatika Sport Centre, Poreč, Croatia	Italy	36 : 20	W	Friendly match
8 January 2025	Varaždin Arena, Varaždin, Croatia	North Macedonia	27 : 25	W	Friendly match
10 January 2025	Arena Zagreb, Zagreb, Croatia	Slovenia	33 : 25	W	Friendly match
15 January 2025	Arena Zagreb, Zagreb, Croatia	Bahrain	36 : 22	W	Group stage of 2025 World Championship
17 January 2025	Arena Zagreb, Zagreb, Croatia	Argentina	33 : 18	W	Group stage of 2025 World Championship
19 January 2025	Arena Zagreb, Zagreb, Croatia	Egypt	24 : 28	L	Group stage of 2025 World Championship
22 January 2025	Arena Zagreb, Zagreb, Croatia	Cape Verde	44 : 24	W	Main round of 2025 World Championship
24 January 2025	Arena Zagreb, Zagreb, Croatia	Iceland	32 : 26	W	Main round of 2025 World Championship
26 January 2025	Arena Zagreb, Zagreb, Croatia	Slovenia	29 : 26	W	Main round of 2025 World Championship
28 January 2025	Arena Zagreb, Zagreb, Croatia	Hungary	31 : 30	W	Quarter final of 2025 World Championship
30 January 2025	Arena Zagreb, Zagreb, Croatia	France	31 : 28	W	Semi final of 2025 World Championship
2 February 2025	Unity Arena, Bærum, Norway	Denmark	26 : 32	L	FINAL of 2025 World Championship
12 March 2025	Winning Group Arena, Brno, Czech Republic	Czech Republic	35 : 29	W	Q for 2026 European Championship
16 March 2025	Arena Zagreb, Zagreb, Croatia	Czech Republic	36 : 20	W	Q for 2026 European Championship
7 May 2025	Sporthal Alverberg, Hasselt, Belgium	Belgium	34 : 22	W	Q for 2026 European Championship
11 May 2025	Centar Zamet, Rijeka, Croatia	Luxembourg	30 : 20	W	Q for 2026 European Championship
30 October 2025	Mobiliar Arena, Bern, Switzerland	Switzerland	29 : 26	W	Friendly match
1 November 2025	Krauerhalle, Kriens, Switzerland	Switzerland	28 : 30	L	Friendly match
28 December 2025	Žatika Sport Centre, Poreč, Croatia	North Macedonia	26 : 23	W	Friendly match
8 January 2026	Arena Zagreb, Zagreb, Croatia	Germany	29 : 32	L	Friendly match
11 January 2026	ZAG-Arena, Hannover, Germany	Germany	27 : 33	L	Friendly match
17 January 2026	Malmö Arena, Malmö, Sweden	Georgia (Georgia (country))	32 : 29	W	Preliminary round at 2026 European Championship
19 January 2026	Malmö Arena, Malmö, Sweden	Netherlands	35 : 29	W	Preliminary round at 2026 European Championship
21 January 2026	Malmö Arena, Malmö, Sweden	Sweden	25 : 33	L	Preliminary round at 2026 European Championship (700th match)
23 January 2026	Malmö Arena, Malmö, Sweden	Iceland	30 : 29	W	Main round at 2026 European Championship
25 January 2026	Malmö Arena, Malmö, Sweden	Switzerland	28 : 24	W	Main round at 2026 European Championship
27 January 2026	Malmö Arena, Malmö, Sweden	Slovenia	29 : 25	W	Main round at 2026 European Championship
28 January 2026	Malmö Arena, Malmö, Sweden	Hungary	27 : 25	W	Main round at 2026 European Championship
30 January 2026	Jyske Bank Boxen, Herning, Denmark	Germany	28 : 31	L	Semi final at 2026 European Championship
1 February 2026	Jyske Bank Boxen, Herning, Denmark	Iceland	34 : 33	W	Third place match at 2026 European Championship
19 March 2026	Krešimir Ćosić Hall, Zadar, Croatia	Switzerland	34 : 26	W	Friendly match
21 March 2026	Gradski vrt Hall, Osijek, Croatia	Switzerland	35 : 35	D	Friendly match
13 May 2026	Kristianstad Arena, Kristianstad, Sweden	Sweden	31 : 34	L	Friendly match
16 May 2026	Varaždin Arena, Varaždin, Croatia	Sweden	35 : 31	W	Friendly match
4 November 2026	?, ?, Croatia	Lithuania	:		Q for 2028 European Championship
7 November 2026	?, ?, Finland	Finland	:		Q for 2028 European Championship
14 January 2027	SAP Garden, Munich, Germany	Chile	:		Preliminary round of 2027 World Championship
16 January 2027	SAP Garden, Munich, Germany	Turkey	:		Preliminary round of 2027 World Championship
18 January 2027	SAP Garden, Munich, Germany	Spain	:		Preliminary round of 2027 World Championship

== Sources ==
- Croatia World Champ., European Champ. and Olympic Games results
- Croatia Statoil World Cup results
- Croatia handball Super Cup results

== Literature ==
- 7m - Revija Hrvatskog rukometnog saveza, Hrvatski Rukometni Savez, 1994
