= Handball at the 2024 Summer Olympics – Women's qualification =

The women's qualification for the Olympic handball tournament occurred between November 2022 and April 2024, assigning quota places to the twelve squads for the Games: the hosts, the world champion, four continental champions (Africa, Europe, Asia and Oceania, and the Americas), and six teams from the IHF World Olympic qualifying tournaments, respectively.

== Summary ==
Qualification	Date	Host	Berths	Qualified team
Host nation	—	—	1	France
2022 European Championship	4–20 November 2022	Slovenia; North Macedonia; Montenegro	1	Denmark
2023 Asian Qualification Tournament	17–23 August 2023	(Japan) Hiroshima	1	South Korea
2023 African Qualification Tournament	11–14 October 2023	(Angola) Luanda	1	Angola
2023 Pan American Games	24–29 October 2023	(Chile) Viña del Mar	1	Brazil
2023 World Championship	29 November – 17 December 2023	Denmark; Norway; Sweden	1	Norway
2024 IHF Women's Olympic Qualification Tournaments	11–14 April 2024	(Hungary) Debrecen	2	Hungary; Sweden
2024 IHF Women's Olympic Qualification Tournaments	11–14 April 2024	(Spain) Torrevieja	2	Netherlands; Spain
2024 IHF Women's Olympic Qualification Tournaments	11–14 April 2024	(Germany) Neu-Ulm	2	Germany; Slovenia
Total			12	

== Legend ==
Qualified
Key	From	To
	Olympic host	2024 Summer Olympics
	2023 IHF World Championship	2024 Summer Olympics
	2022–2024 Continental Qualification Tournament	2024 Summer Olympics
	2023 IHF World Championship	2024 IHF World Olympic Qualification Tournament
	2022–2024 Continental Qualification Tournament	2024 IHF World Olympic Qualification Tournament

== Host country ==
- France

== World Championship ==
Rank	Team
1st place, gold medalist(s)	France
2nd place, silver medalist(s)	Norway
3rd place, bronze medalist(s)	Denmark
4	Sweden
5	Netherlands
6	Germany
7	Montenegro
8	Czech Republic
9	Brazil
10	Hungary
11	Slovenia
12	Romania
13	Spain
14	Croatia
15	Angola
16	Poland
17	Japan
18	Senegal
19	Austria
20	Argentina
21	Serbia
22	South Korea
23	Ukraine
24	Cameroon
25	Iceland
26	Congo
27	Chile
28	China
29	Paraguay
30	Kazakhstan
31	Iran
32	Greenland

Ineligible to qualify for the Olympics: Greenland do not have a National Olympic Committee recognized by the IOC

== Continental qualification ==
=== Europe ===
Rank	Team
1st place, gold medalist(s)	Norway
2nd place, silver medalist(s)	Denmark
3rd place, bronze medalist(s)	Montenegro
4	France
5	Sweden
6	Netherlands
7	Germany
8	Slovenia
9	Spain
10	Croatia
11	Hungary
12	Romania
13	Poland
14	Switzerland
15	Serbia
16	North Macedonia

=== Americas ===
The winner of the Pan American Games handball tournament directly qualified for the Olympics. The Olympic Qualification Tournaments berth was given to the Pan American Games handball tournament runner-up.

Rank	Team
1st place, gold medalist(s)	Brazil
2nd place, silver medalist(s)	Argentina
3rd place, bronze medalist(s)	Paraguay
4	Chile
5	Puerto Rico
6	Cuba
7	Uruguay
8	Canada

=== Asia ===
Uzbekistan withdrew before the tournament.

Pos	Team	Pld	W	D	L	GF	GA	GD	Pts	Qualification
1	South Korea	4	4	0	0	156	82	+74	8	2024 Summer Olympics
2	Japan (H)	4	3	0	1	163	88	+75	6	Qualification tournaments
3	China	4	2	0	2	101	118	−17	4	
4	Kazakhstan	4	1	0	3	112	154	−42	2	
5	India	4	0	0	4	81	171	−90	0	

Source: AHF
Rules for classification: 1) points; 2) head-to-head points; 3) head-to-head goal difference; 4) head-to-head number of goals scored; 5) goal difference.
(H) Hosts

=== Africa ===
The tournament was held in Luanda, Angola.

Pos	Team	Pld	W	D	L	GF	GA	GD	Pts	Qualification
1	Angola (H)	3	3	0	0	79	57	+22	6	2024 Summer Olympics
2	Cameroon	3	1	1	1	59	63	−4	3	Qualification tournaments
3	Senegal	3	1	0	2	63	61	+2	2	
4	Congo	3	0	1	2	58	78	−20	1	

Rules for classification: 1) points; 2) head-to-head points; 3) head-to-head goal difference; 4) head-to-head number of goals scored; 5) goal difference.
(H) Hosts

== Olympic Qualification Tournaments ==
=== Qualified teams ===
There were three qualifying tournaments. Only twelve eligible teams through the five events mentioned above qualified for these tournaments:

- The top six teams from the World championship that did not already qualify through their continental championships were eligible to participate in the tournament.
- The highest-ranked teams of each continent in the World championship represented the continent in order to determine the continental ranking. The first-ranked continent (Europe) received two more places for the tournament. The second (Americas), third (Africa), and fourth (Asia)-ranked continents received one place each. The last place belongs to a team from Oceania, if one was ranked between 8 and 12th at the World Championship. As no team from Oceania met this condition, the second-ranked continent received an extra place instead. The teams that already earned their places through their World championship ranking were not considered for receiving places through the continental criterion. In such cases, the access list was rebalanced accordingly.
- The twelve teams were allocated in three pools of four teams according to the table below. The top two teams from each pool qualified for the 2024 Olympic Games.

2024 Olympic Qualification Tournament #1	2024 Olympic Qualification Tournament #2	2024 Olympic Qualification Tournament #3
4th from World: Sweden; 10th from World: Hungary; ~~2nd from Africa: Cameroon~~; 2nd from Asia: Japan; Wild card: Great Britain	5th from World: Netherlands; 8th from World: Czech Republic; 2nd from Americas: Argentina; 9th from Europe: Spain	6th from World: Germany; 7th from World: Montenegro; 8th from Europe: Slovenia; 3rd from Americas: Paraguay

The host countries were announced on 22 December 2023.

On 9 April 2024, Cameroon withdrew and was replaced by Great Britain.

=== 2024 Olympic Qualification Tournament #1 ===
Pos	Team	Pld	W	D	L	GF	GA	GD	Pts	Qualification
1	Hungary (H)	3	3	0	0	114	64	+50	6	2024 Summer Olympics
2	Sweden	3	2	0	1	112	64	+48	4	2024 Summer Olympics
3	Japan	3	1	0	2	99	88	+11	2	
4	Great Britain	3	0	0	3	35	144	−109	0	

Source: IHF
Rules for classification: 1) Points; 2) Head-to-head points; 3) Head-to-head goal difference; 4) Head-to-head goals scored; 5) Goal difference; 6) Goals scored; 7) Draw.
(H) Hosts

=== 2024 Olympic Qualification Tournament #2 ===
Pos	Team	Pld	W	D	L	GF	GA	GD	Pts	Qualification
1	Netherlands	3	3	0	0	93	66	+27	6	2024 Summer Olympics
2	Spain (H)	3	2	0	1	83	71	+12	4	2024 Summer Olympics
3	Czech Republic	3	1	0	2	80	96	−16	2	
4	Argentina	3	0	0	3	78	101	−23	0	

Source: IHF
Rules for classification: 1) Points; 2) Head-to-head points; 3) Head-to-head goal difference; 4) Head-to-head goals scored; 5) Goal difference; 6) Goals scored; 7) Draw.
(H) Hosts

=== 2024 Olympic Qualification Tournament #3 ===
Pos	Team	Pld	W	D	L	GF	GA	GD	Pts	Qualification
1	Germany (H)	3	3	0	0	96	69	+27	6	2024 Summer Olympics
2	Slovenia	3	2	0	1	87	71	+16	4	2024 Summer Olympics
3	Montenegro	3	1	0	2	80	83	−3	2	
4	Paraguay	3	0	0	3	59	99	−40	0	

Source: IHF
Rules for classification: 1) Points; 2) Head-to-head points; 3) Head-to-head goal difference; 4) Head-to-head goals scored; 5) Goal difference; 6) Goals scored; 7) Draw.
(H) Hosts

== See also ==
- Handball at the 2024 Summer Olympics – Men's qualification
