= 2003 World Men's Handball Championship =

Tournament details
- Host country: Portugal
- Venue(s): 9 (in 9 host cities)
- Dates: 20 January–2 February
- Teams: 24 (from 5 confederations)

Final positions
- Champions: Croatia (1st title)
- Runners-up: Germany
- Third place: France
- Fourth place: Spain

Tournament statistics
- Matches played: 84
- Goals scored: 4,641 (55.25 per match)
- Top scorer(s): Carlos Pérez (HUN) (64 goals)

Awards
- Best player: Christian Schwarzer (GER)

The 2003 World Men's Handball Championship took place in Portugal from 20 January to 2 February 2003. It was the 18th edition of the World Championship in team handball and Croatia won the championship.

== Venues ==
9 cities were hosts for the tournament. The final match took place in the capital Lisbon.

Town	Stadium	max. spectators
Lisbon	Pavilhão Atlântico	15.000
Rio Maior	Pavilhão Polidesportivo	6.500
São João da Madeira	Pavilhão das Travessas	6.000
Guimarães	Pavilhão Multiusos	3.000
Viseu	Viseu Arena	2.600
Funchal	Madeira Tecnopolo	2.500
Caminha	Pavilhão Municipal	2.500
Póvoa de Varzim	Pavilhão Desportivo	2.500
Espinho	Pavilhão Multiusos NW	2.000

Lisbon	Rio Maior	São João da Madeira	Guimarães
Pavilhão Atlântico	Pavilhão Polidesportivo	Pavilhão das Travessas	Pavilhão Multiusos
Capacity: 15,000	Capacity: 6,500	Capacity: 6,000	Capacity: 3,000
Viseu	2003 World Men's Handball Championship is located in Portugal		
Viseu Arena	2003 World Men's Handball Championship is located in Portugal		
Capacity: 2,600	2003 World Men's Handball Championship is located in Portugal		
Funchal	Caminha	Póvoa de Varzim	Espinho
Madeira Tecnopolo	Pavilhão Municipal	Pavilhão Desportivo	Pavilhão Multiusos NW
Capacity: 2,500	Capacity: 2,500	Capacity: 2,500	Capacity: 2,000

== Qualification ==
Competition	Dates	Vacancies	Qualified
Host nation		1	Portugal
2001 World Men's Handball Championship	23 January – 4 February 2001	1	France
2002 European Men's Handball Championship	25 January – 3 February 2002	3	Sweden; Germany; Denmark
2002 Asian Men's Handball Championship	10–19 February 2002	3	Kuwait; Qatar; Saudi Arabia
2002 African Men's Handball Championship	19–28 April 2002	4	Tunisia; Algeria; Egypt; Morocco
2002 Oceania Handball Championship	5–7 July 2002	1	Australia
European qualification	8 January – 9 July 2002	8	Croatia; Hungary; Iceland; Poland; Russia; Slovenia; Spain; Yugoslavia
2002 Pan American Men's Handball Championship	10–14 July 2002	3	Argentina; Brazil; Greenland

== First round ==
=== Group A ===
Pos	Team	Pld	W	D	L	GF	GA	GD	Pts	Qualification
1	Spain	5	5	0	0	157	106	+51	10	Second round
2	Yugoslavia	5	4	0	1	142	103	+39	8	Second round
3	Poland	5	3	0	2	140	130	+10	6	Second round
4	Tunisia	5	2	0	3	131	129	+2	4	Second round
5	Kuwait	5	1	0	4	98	168	−70	2	
6	Morocco	5	0	0	5	113	145	−32	0	

Source: IHF

20 January 2003; 15:30	Tunisia	29–20	Kuwait	Pavilhão Multiusos de Guimarães, Guimarães; Attendance: 1,500; Referees: Boye, Jensen (DEN)
20 January 2003; 15:30		(16–10)		Pavilhão Multiusos de Guimarães, Guimarães; Attendance: 1,500; Referees: Boye, Jensen (DEN)
20 January 2003; 15:30		Report		Pavilhão Multiusos de Guimarães, Guimarães; Attendance: 1,500; Referees: Boye, Jensen (DEN)

20 January 2003; 18:30	Yugoslavia	24–20	Poland	Pavilhão Multiusos de Guimarães, Guimarães; Referees: Dolejš, Kohout (CZE)
20 January 2003; 18:30		(12–9)		Pavilhão Multiusos de Guimarães, Guimarães; Referees: Dolejš, Kohout (CZE)
20 January 2003; 18:30		Report		Pavilhão Multiusos de Guimarães, Guimarães; Referees: Dolejš, Kohout (CZE)

20 January 2003; 20:30	Spain	23–18	Morocco	Pavilhão Multiusos de Guimarães, Guimarães; Referees: Kang, Lim (KOR)
20 January 2003; 20:30		(13–8)		Pavilhão Multiusos de Guimarães, Guimarães; Referees: Kang, Lim (KOR)
20 January 2003; 20:30		Report		Pavilhão Multiusos de Guimarães, Guimarães; Referees: Kang, Lim (KOR)

21 January 2003; 15:30	Kuwait	14–36	Yugoslavia	Pavilhão Multiusos de Guimarães, Guimarães; Attendance: 750; Referees: Kang, Lim (KOR)
21 January 2003; 15:30		(3–20)		Pavilhão Multiusos de Guimarães, Guimarães; Attendance: 750; Referees: Kang, Lim (KOR)

21 January 2003; 18:30	Morocco	24–28	Tunisia	Pavilhão Multiusos de Guimarães, Guimarães; Attendance: 150; Referees: Bord, Buy (FRA)
21 January 2003; 18:30		(15–14)		Pavilhão Multiusos de Guimarães, Guimarães; Attendance: 150; Referees: Bord, Buy (FRA)
21 January 2003; 18:30		Report		Pavilhão Multiusos de Guimarães, Guimarães; Attendance: 150; Referees: Bord, Buy (FRA)

21 January 2003; 20:30	Poland	25–34	Spain	Pavilhão Multiusos de Guimarães, Guimarães; Referees: Bord, Buy (FRA)
21 January 2003; 20:30		(16–17)		Pavilhão Multiusos de Guimarães, Guimarães; Referees: Bord, Buy (FRA)
21 January 2003; 20:30		Report		Pavilhão Multiusos de Guimarães, Guimarães; Referees: Bord, Buy (FRA)

23 January 2003; 15:30	Morocco	22–25	Kuwait	Pavilhão Multiusos de Guimarães, Guimarães; Referees: Dolejš, Kohout (CZE)
23 January 2003; 15:30		(9–11)		Pavilhão Multiusos de Guimarães, Guimarães; Referees: Dolejš, Kohout (CZE)

23 January 2003; 18:30	Tunisia	22–24	Poland	Pavilhão Multiusos de Guimarães, Guimarães; Attendance: 800; Referees: Kang, Lim (KOR)
23 January 2003; 18:30		(11–11)		Pavilhão Multiusos de Guimarães, Guimarães; Attendance: 800; Referees: Kang, Lim (KOR)

23 January 2003; 20:30	Spain	22–20	Yugoslavia	Pavilhão Multiusos de Guimarães, Guimarães; Attendance: 3,500; Referees: Bord, Buy (FRA)
23 January 2003; 20:30		(12–9)		Pavilhão Multiusos de Guimarães, Guimarães; Attendance: 3,500; Referees: Bord, Buy (FRA)
23 January 2003; 20:30		Report		Pavilhão Multiusos de Guimarães, Guimarães; Attendance: 3,500; Referees: Bord, Buy (FRA)

25 January 2003; 16:00	Spain	45–18	Kuwait	Pavilhão Multiusos de Guimarães, Guimarães; Referees: Anusic, Bojsen (USA)
25 January 2003; 16:00		(24–8)		Pavilhão Multiusos de Guimarães, Guimarães; Referees: Anusic, Bojsen (USA)
25 January 2003; 16:00		Report		Pavilhão Multiusos de Guimarães, Guimarães; Referees: Anusic, Bojsen (USA)

25 January 2003; 18:00	Yugoslavia	28–27	Tunisia	Pavilhão Multiusos de Guimarães, Guimarães; Referees: Hansson, Olsson (SWE)
25 January 2003; 18:00		(20–10)		Pavilhão Multiusos de Guimarães, Guimarães; Referees: Hansson, Olsson (SWE)

25 January 2003; 20:00	Poland	35–29	Morocco	Pavilhão Multiusos de Guimarães, Guimarães; Attendance: 150; Referees: Repenšek, Požežnik (SLO)
25 January 2003; 20:00		(17–12)		Pavilhão Multiusos de Guimarães, Guimarães; Attendance: 150; Referees: Repenšek, Požežnik (SLO)

26 January 2003; 16:00	Tunisia	25–33	Spain	Pavilhão Multiusos de Guimarães, Guimarães; Attendance: 900; Referees: Anusic, Bojsen (USA)
26 January 2003; 16:00		(13–18)		Pavilhão Multiusos de Guimarães, Guimarães; Attendance: 900; Referees: Anusic, Bojsen (USA)

26 January 2003; 18:00	Yugoslavia	34–20	Morocco	Pavilhão Multiusos de Guimarães, Guimarães; Referees: Selim, Hassan (EGY)
26 January 2003; 18:00		(17–9)		Pavilhão Multiusos de Guimarães, Guimarães; Referees: Selim, Hassan (EGY)

26 January 2003; 20:00	Kuwait	21–36	Poland	Pavilhão Multiusos de Guimarães, Guimarães; Referees: Repenšek, Požežnik (SLO)
26 January 2003; 20:00		(10–15)		Pavilhão Multiusos de Guimarães, Guimarães; Referees: Repenšek, Požežnik (SLO)

=== Group B ===
Pos	Team	Pld	W	D	L	GF	GA	GD	Pts	Qualification
1	Germany	5	5	0	0	191	111	+80	10	Second round
2	Iceland	5	4	0	1	185	116	+69	8	Second round
3	Portugal	5	3	0	2	164	126	+38	6	Second round
4	Qatar	5	2	0	3	116	159	−43	4	Second round
5	Australia	5	1	0	4	100	192	−92	2	
6	Greenland	5	0	0	5	100	152	−52	0	

Source: IHF

20 January 2003; 12:23	Iceland	55–15	Australia	Pavilhão Multiusos de Viseu, Viseu; Referees: Anusic, Bojsen (USA)
20 January 2003; 12:23		(23–6)		Pavilhão Multiusos de Viseu, Viseu; Referees: Anusic, Bojsen (USA)
20 January 2003; 12:23		Report		Pavilhão Multiusos de Viseu, Viseu; Referees: Anusic, Bojsen (USA)

20 January 2003; 14:15	Germany	40–17	Qatar	Pavilhão Multiusos de Viseu, Viseu; Referees: Repenšek, Požežnik (SLO)
20 January 2003; 14:15		(23–8)		Pavilhão Multiusos de Viseu, Viseu; Referees: Repenšek, Požežnik (SLO)
20 January 2003; 14:15		Report		Pavilhão Multiusos de Viseu, Viseu; Referees: Repenšek, Požežnik (SLO)

20 January 2003; 17:00	Portugal	34–19	Greenland	Pavilhão Multiusos de Viseu, Viseu; Referees: Hansson, Olsson (SWE)
20 January 2003; 17:00		(20–8)		Pavilhão Multiusos de Viseu, Viseu; Referees: Hansson, Olsson (SWE)
20 January 2003; 17:00		Report		Pavilhão Multiusos de Viseu, Viseu; Referees: Hansson, Olsson (SWE)

21 January 2003; 14:15	Australia	16–46	Germany	Pavilhão Multiusos de Viseu, Viseu; Referees: Anusic, Bojsen (USA)
21 January 2003; 14:15		(6–24)		Pavilhão Multiusos de Viseu, Viseu; Referees: Anusic, Bojsen (USA)

21 January 2003; 17:00	Greenland	17–30	Iceland	Pavilhão Multiusos de Viseu, Viseu; Referees: Selim, Hassan (EGY)
21 January 2003; 17:00		(8–16)		Pavilhão Multiusos de Viseu, Viseu; Referees: Selim, Hassan (EGY)
21 January 2003; 17:00		Report		Pavilhão Multiusos de Viseu, Viseu; Referees: Selim, Hassan (EGY)

21 January 2003; 19:00	Qatar	21–31	Portugal	Pavilhão Multiusos de Viseu, Viseu; Referees: Johansson, Kliko (SWE)
21 January 2003; 19:00		(10–15)		Pavilhão Multiusos de Viseu, Viseu; Referees: Johansson, Kliko (SWE)

23 January 2003; 14:15	Germany	34–20	Greenland	Pavilhão Multiusos de Viseu, Viseu; Referees: Hansson, Olsson (SWE)
23 January 2003; 14:15		(20–11)		Pavilhão Multiusos de Viseu, Viseu; Referees: Hansson, Olsson (SWE)
23 January 2003; 14:15		Report		Pavilhão Multiusos de Viseu, Viseu; Referees: Hansson, Olsson (SWE)

23 January 2003; 17:00	Australia	23–28	Qatar	Pavilhão Multiusos de Viseu, Viseu; Referees: Selim, Hassan (EGY)
23 January 2003; 17:00		(10–14)		Pavilhão Multiusos de Viseu, Viseu; Referees: Selim, Hassan (EGY)
23 January 2003; 17:00		Report		Pavilhão Multiusos de Viseu, Viseu; Referees: Selim, Hassan (EGY)

23 January 2003; 19:00	Iceland	29–28	Portugal	Pavilhão Multiusos de Viseu, Viseu; Referees: Repenšek, Požežnik (SLO)
23 January 2003; 19:00		(14–13)		Pavilhão Multiusos de Viseu, Viseu; Referees: Repenšek, Požežnik (SLO)
23 January 2003; 19:00		Report		Pavilhão Multiusos de Viseu, Viseu; Referees: Repenšek, Požežnik (SLO)

25 January 2003; 15:15	Portugal	29–37	Germany	Pavilhão Multiusos de Viseu, Viseu; Referees: Boye, Jensen (DEN)
25 January 2003; 15:15		(15–19)		Pavilhão Multiusos de Viseu, Viseu; Referees: Boye, Jensen (DEN)

25 January 2003; 17:15	Iceland	42–22	Qatar	Pavilhão Multiusos de Viseu, Viseu; Referees: Bord, Buy (FRA)
25 January 2003; 17:15		(24–9)		Pavilhão Multiusos de Viseu, Viseu; Referees: Bord, Buy (FRA)

25 January 2003; 19:15	Greenland	21–26	Australia	Pavilhão Multiusos de Viseu, Viseu; Referees: Dolejš, Kohout (CZE)
25 January 2003; 19:15		(12–12)		Pavilhão Multiusos de Viseu, Viseu; Referees: Dolejš, Kohout (CZE)

26 January 2003; 16:15	Germany	34–29	Iceland	Pavilhão Multiusos de Viseu, Viseu; Referees: Dolejš, Kohout (CZE)
26 January 2003; 16:15		(20–16)		Pavilhão Multiusos de Viseu, Viseu; Referees: Dolejš, Kohout (CZE)

26 January 2003; 18:15	Portugal	42–20	Australia	Pavilhão Multiusos de Viseu, Viseu; Referees: Kang, Lim (KOR)
26 January 2003; 18:15		(22–11)		Pavilhão Multiusos de Viseu, Viseu; Referees: Kang, Lim (KOR)

26 January 2003; 20:15	Qatar	28–23	Greenland	Pavilhão Multiusos de Viseu, Viseu; Referees: Borrotti, Marcet (FRA)
26 January 2003; 20:15		(15–8)		Pavilhão Multiusos de Viseu, Viseu; Referees: Borrotti, Marcet (FRA)

=== Group C ===
Pos	Team	Pld	W	D	L	GF	GA	GD	Pts	Qualification
1	Croatia	5	4	0	1	135	125	+10	8 (Note: Croatia 23–22 France)	Second round
2	France	5	4	0	1	147	103	+44	8	Second round
3	Russia	5	2	1	2	132	132	0	5	Second round
4	Hungary	5	2	0	3	154	138	+16	4	Second round
5	Argentina	5	1	1	3	127	156	−29	3	
6	Saudi Arabia	5	1	0	4	114	155	−41	2	

Source: IHF
Notes:

20 January 2003; 15:00	Russia	31–30	Hungary	Madeira Tecnopolo, Funchal; Referees: Nachevski, Nachevski (MKD)
20 January 2003; 15:00		(15–14)		Madeira Tecnopolo, Funchal; Referees: Nachevski, Nachevski (MKD)
20 January 2003; 15:00		Report		Madeira Tecnopolo, Funchal; Referees: Nachevski, Nachevski (MKD)

20 January 2003; 17:00	Croatia	29–30	Argentina	Madeira Tecnopolo, Funchal; Referees: Arnaldsson, Viðarsson (ISL)
20 January 2003; 17:00		(18–13)		Madeira Tecnopolo, Funchal; Referees: Arnaldsson, Viðarsson (ISL)
20 January 2003; 17:00		Report		Madeira Tecnopolo, Funchal; Referees: Arnaldsson, Viðarsson (ISL)

20 January 2003; 20:00	France	30–23	Saudi Arabia	Madeira Tecnopolo, Funchal; Referees: Goulão, Macau (POR)
20 January 2003; 20:00		(14–10)		Madeira Tecnopolo, Funchal; Referees: Goulão, Macau (POR)

21 January 2003; 15:00	Argentina	26–26	Russia	Madeira Tecnopolo, Funchal; Referees: Goulão, Macau (POR)
21 January 2003; 15:00		(11–15)		Madeira Tecnopolo, Funchal; Referees: Goulão, Macau (POR)
21 January 2003; 15:00		Report		Madeira Tecnopolo, Funchal; Referees: Goulão, Macau (POR)

21 January 2003; 18:00	Saudi Arabia	18–25	Croatia	Madeira Tecnopolo, Funchal; Referees: Nachevski, Nachevski (MKD)
21 January 2003; 18:00		(10–8)		Madeira Tecnopolo, Funchal; Referees: Nachevski, Nachevski (MKD)
21 January 2003; 18:00		Report		Madeira Tecnopolo, Funchal; Referees: Nachevski, Nachevski (MKD)

21 January 2003; 20:00	Hungary	24–29	France	Madeira Tecnopolo, Funchal; Referees: Vakula, Liudovyk (UKR)
21 January 2003; 20:00		(10–18)		Madeira Tecnopolo, Funchal; Referees: Vakula, Liudovyk (UKR)

23 January 2003; 15:00	Russia	26–28	Croatia	Madeira Tecnopolo, Funchal; Referees: Arnaldsson, Viðarsson (ISL)
23 January 2003; 15:00		(10–12)		Madeira Tecnopolo, Funchal; Referees: Arnaldsson, Viðarsson (ISL)
23 January 2003; 15:00		Report		Madeira Tecnopolo, Funchal; Referees: Arnaldsson, Viðarsson (ISL)

23 January 2003; 18:00	Hungary	36–25	Saudi Arabia	Madeira Tecnopolo, Funchal; Referees: Vakula, Liudovyk (UKR)
23 January 2003; 18:00		(22–12)		Madeira Tecnopolo, Funchal; Referees: Vakula, Liudovyk (UKR)

23 January 2003; 20:00	France	35–18	Argentina	Madeira Tecnopolo, Funchal; Referees: Nachevski, Nachevski (MKD)
23 January 2003; 20:00		(14–6)		Madeira Tecnopolo, Funchal; Referees: Nachevski, Nachevski (MKD)
23 January 2003; 20:00		Report		Madeira Tecnopolo, Funchal; Referees: Nachevski, Nachevski (MKD)

25 January 2003; 15:00	Argentina	23–35	Hungary	Madeira Tecnopolo, Funchal; Referees: Arnaldsson, Viðarsson (ISL)
25 January 2003; 15:00		(15–15)		Madeira Tecnopolo, Funchal; Referees: Arnaldsson, Viðarsson (ISL)
25 January 2003; 15:00		Report		Madeira Tecnopolo, Funchal; Referees: Arnaldsson, Viðarsson (ISL)

25 January 2003; 17:00	Croatia	23–22	France	Madeira Tecnopolo, Funchal; Referees: Vakula, Liudovyk (UKR)
25 January 2003; 17:00		(11–10)		Madeira Tecnopolo, Funchal; Referees: Vakula, Liudovyk (UKR)

25 January 2003; 19:00	Russia	34–17	Saudi Arabia	Madeira Tecnopolo, Funchal; Referees: Goulão, Macau (POR)
25 January 2003; 19:00		(19–8)		Madeira Tecnopolo, Funchal; Referees: Goulão, Macau (POR)

26 January 2003; 15:00	Croatia	30–29	Hungary	Madeira Tecnopolo, Funchal; Referees: Goulão, Macau (POR)
26 January 2003; 15:00		(16–13)		Madeira Tecnopolo, Funchal; Referees: Goulão, Macau (POR)

26 January 2003; 17:00	Saudi Arabia	31–30	Argentina	Madeira Tecnopolo, Funchal; Referees: Vakula, Liudovyk (UKR)
26 January 2003; 17:00		(14–14)		Madeira Tecnopolo, Funchal; Referees: Vakula, Liudovyk (UKR)

26 January 2003; 19:00	France	31–15	Russia	Madeira Tecnopolo, Funchal; Referees: Nachevski, Nachevski (MKD)
26 January 2003; 19:00		(15–6)		Madeira Tecnopolo, Funchal; Referees: Nachevski, Nachevski (MKD)

=== Group D ===
Pos	Team	Pld	W	D	L	GF	GA	GD	Pts	Qualification
1	Sweden	5	4	0	1	147	129	+18	8 (Note: Sweden 32–28 Denmark)	Second round
2	Denmark	5	4	0	1	146	125	+21	8	Second round
3	Slovenia	5	3	0	2	144	137	+7	6	Second round
4	Egypt	5	2	1	2	132	139	−7	5	Second round
5	Algeria	5	0	2	3	119	136	−17	2	
6	Brazil	5	0	1	4	118	140	−22	1	

Source: IHF
Notes:

20 January 2003; 15:00	Algeria	22–22	Brazil	Pavilhão Municipal das Travessas, São João da Madeira; Referees: Breto, Huelin (ESP)
20 January 2003; 15:00		(10–11)		Pavilhão Municipal das Travessas, São João da Madeira; Referees: Breto, Huelin (ESP)

20 January 2003; 18:30	Sweden	29–23	Egypt	Pavilhão Municipal das Travessas, São João da Madeira; Referees: Baum, Góralczyk (POL)
20 January 2003; 18:30		(14–13)		Pavilhão Municipal das Travessas, São João da Madeira; Referees: Baum, Góralczyk (POL)

20 January 2003; 20:30	Denmark	33–24	Slovenia	Pavilhão Municipal das Travessas, São João da Madeira; Referees: Lemme, Ullrich (GER)
20 January 2003; 20:30		(17–10)		Pavilhão Municipal das Travessas, São João da Madeira; Referees: Lemme, Ullrich (GER)
20 January 2003; 20:30		Report		Pavilhão Municipal das Travessas, São João da Madeira; Referees: Lemme, Ullrich (GER)

21 January 2003; 15:00	Egypt	25–25	Algeria	Pavilhão Municipal das Travessas, São João da Madeira; Referees: Lemme, Ullrich (GER)
21 January 2003; 15:00		(13–13)		Pavilhão Municipal das Travessas, São João da Madeira; Referees: Lemme, Ullrich (GER)
21 January 2003; 15:00		Report		Pavilhão Municipal das Travessas, São João da Madeira; Referees: Lemme, Ullrich (GER)

21 January 2003; 18:30	Slovenia	29–25	Sweden	Pavilhão Municipal das Travessas, São João da Madeira; Referees: Breto, Huelin (ESP)
21 January 2003; 18:30		(14–12)		Pavilhão Municipal das Travessas, São João da Madeira; Referees: Breto, Huelin (ESP)
21 January 2003; 18:30		Report		Pavilhão Municipal das Travessas, São João da Madeira; Referees: Breto, Huelin (ESP)

21 January 2003; 20:30	Brazil	24–28	Denmark	Pavilhão Municipal das Travessas, São João da Madeira; Referees: Hussain, Haider (KUW)
21 January 2003; 20:30		(10–11)		Pavilhão Municipal das Travessas, São João da Madeira; Referees: Hussain, Haider (KUW)

23 January 2003; 15:00	Slovenia	26–27	Egypt	Pavilhão Municipal das Travessas, São João da Madeira; Referees: Lemme, Ullrich (GER)
23 January 2003; 15:00		(14–13)		Pavilhão Municipal das Travessas, São João da Madeira; Referees: Lemme, Ullrich (GER)
23 January 2003; 15:00		Report		Pavilhão Municipal das Travessas, São João da Madeira; Referees: Lemme, Ullrich (GER)

23 January 2003; 18:30	Sweden	29–21	Brazil	Pavilhão Municipal das Travessas, São João da Madeira; Referees: Baum, Góralczyk (POL)
23 January 2003; 18:30		(12–12)		Pavilhão Municipal das Travessas, São João da Madeira; Referees: Baum, Góralczyk (POL)
23 January 2003; 18:30		Report		Pavilhão Municipal das Travessas, São João da Madeira; Referees: Baum, Góralczyk (POL)

23 January 2003; 20:30	Denmark	22–19	Algeria	Pavilhão Municipal das Travessas, São João da Madeira; Referees: Breto, Huelin (ESP)
23 January 2003; 20:30		(9–13)		Pavilhão Municipal das Travessas, São João da Madeira; Referees: Breto, Huelin (ESP)
23 January 2003; 20:30		Report		Pavilhão Municipal das Travessas, São João da Madeira; Referees: Breto, Huelin (ESP)

25 January 2003; 13:00	Algeria	28–32	Sweden	Pavilhão Municipal das Travessas, São João da Madeira; Referees: Hussain, Haider (KUW)
25 January 2003; 13:00		(12–17)		Pavilhão Municipal das Travessas, São João da Madeira; Referees: Hussain, Haider (KUW)
25 January 2003; 13:00		Report		Pavilhão Municipal das Travessas, São João da Madeira; Referees: Hussain, Haider (KUW)

25 January 2003; 18:00	Brazil	27–30	Slovenia	Pavilhão Municipal das Travessas, São João da Madeira; Attendance: 1,200; Referees: Baum, Góralczyk (POL)
25 January 2003; 18:00		(10–15)		Pavilhão Municipal das Travessas, São João da Madeira; Attendance: 1,200; Referees: Baum, Góralczyk (POL)

25 January 2003; 20:00	Denmark	35–26	Egypt	Pavilhão Municipal das Travessas, São João da Madeira; Attendance: 2,100; Referees: Breto, Huelin (ESP)
25 January 2003; 20:00		(18–12)		Pavilhão Municipal das Travessas, São João da Madeira; Attendance: 2,100; Referees: Breto, Huelin (ESP)

26 January 2003; 16:00	Sweden	32–28	Denmark	Pavilhão Municipal das Travessas, São João da Madeira; Referees: Lemme, Ullrich (GER)
26 January 2003; 16:00		(19–14)		Pavilhão Municipal das Travessas, São João da Madeira; Referees: Lemme, Ullrich (GER)

26 January 2003; 18:00	Egypt	31–24	Brazil	Pavilhão Municipal das Travessas, São João da Madeira; Referees: Breto, Huelin (ESP)
26 January 2003; 18:00		(17–11)		Pavilhão Municipal das Travessas, São João da Madeira; Referees: Breto, Huelin (ESP)

26 January 2003; 19:00	Algeria	25–35	Slovenia	Pavilhão Municipal das Travessas, São João da Madeira; Referees: Baum, Góralczyk (POL)
26 January 2003; 19:00		(13–16)		Pavilhão Municipal das Travessas, São João da Madeira; Referees: Baum, Góralczyk (POL)

== Second round ==
=== Group I ===
Pos	Team	Pld	W	D	L	GF	GA	GD	Pts	Qualification
1	Spain	3	3	0	0	106	71	+35	6	Semifinals
2	Iceland	3	2	0	1	106	83	+23	4	5–8th place semifinals
3	Poland	3	1	0	2	89	93	−4	2	
4	Qatar	3	0	0	3	63	117	−54	0	

Source: IHF

29 January 2003; 18:30	Iceland	33–29	Poland	Caminha; Referees: Goulão, Macau (POR)
29 January 2003; 18:30		(14–17)		Caminha; Referees: Goulão, Macau (POR)

29 January 2003; 20:30	Spain	40–15	Qatar	Caminha; Referees: Lemme, Ullrich (GER)
29 January 2003; 20:30		(20–6)		Caminha; Referees: Lemme, Ullrich (GER)

30 January 2003; 18:30	Poland	35–26	Qatar	Caminha; Referees: Kang, Lim (KOR)
30 January 2003; 18:30		(18–11)		Caminha; Referees: Kang, Lim (KOR)

30 January 2003; 20:30	Spain	32–31	Iceland	Caminha; Referees: Lemme, Ullrich (GER)
30 January 2003; 20:30		(18–18)		Caminha; Referees: Lemme, Ullrich (GER)

=== Group II ===
Pos	Team	Pld	W	D	L	GF	GA	GD	Pts	Qualification
1	Germany	3	2	1	0	98	81	+17	5 (Note: Germany 31–31 Yugoslavia)	Semifinals
2	Yugoslavia	3	2	1	0	89	86	+3	5	5–8th place semifinals
3	Portugal	3	1	0	2	84	93	−9	2	
4	Tunisia	3	0	0	3	74	85	−11	0	

Source: IHF
Notes:

29 January 2003; 14:15	Germany	30–21	Tunisia	Póvoa de Varzim; Referees: Vakula, Liudovyk (UKR)
29 January 2003; 14:15		(14–13)		Póvoa de Varzim; Referees: Vakula, Liudovyk (UKR)

29 January 2003; 18:30	Yugoslavia	30–28	Portugal	Póvoa de Varzim; Referees: Baum, Góralczyk (POL)
29 January 2003; 18:30		(18–7)		Póvoa de Varzim; Referees: Baum, Góralczyk (POL)

30 January 2003; 14:15	Germany	31–31	Yugoslavia	Póvoa de Varzim; Attendance: 800; Referees: Arnaldsson, Viðarsson (ISL)
30 January 2003; 14:15		(15–16)		Póvoa de Varzim; Attendance: 800; Referees: Arnaldsson, Viðarsson (ISL)

30 January 2003; 18:30	Portugal	27–26	Tunisia	Póvoa de Varzim; Referees: Baum, Góralczyk (POL)
30 January 2003; 18:30		(14–12)		Póvoa de Varzim; Referees: Baum, Góralczyk (POL)

=== Group III ===
Pos	Team	Pld	W	D	L	GF	GA	GD	Pts	Qualification
1	Croatia	3	3	0	0	90	76	+14	6	Semifinals
2	Russia	3	2	0	1	90	78	+12	4	5–8th place semifinals
3	Denmark	3	1	0	2	90	94	−4	2	
4	Egypt	3	0	0	3	71	93	−22	0	

Source: IHF

29 January 2003; 18:15	Croatia	29–23	Egypt	Rio Maior; Referees: Bord, Buy (FRA)
29 January 2003; 18:15		(13–11)		Rio Maior; Referees: Bord, Buy (FRA)

29 January 2003; 20:30	Denmark	28–35	Russia	Rio Maior; Referees: Repenšek, Požežnik (SLO)
29 January 2003; 20:30		(16–16)		Rio Maior; Referees: Repenšek, Požežnik (SLO)

30 January 2003; 18:15	Russia	29–22	Egypt	Rio Maior; Referees: Hansson, Olsson (SWE)
30 January 2003; 18:15		(12–11)		Rio Maior; Referees: Hansson, Olsson (SWE)

30 January 2003; 20:30	Croatia	33–27	Denmark	Rio Maior; Referees: Bord, Buy (FRA)
30 January 2003; 20:30		(19–11)		Rio Maior; Referees: Bord, Buy (FRA)

=== Group IV ===
Pos	Team	Pld	W	D	L	GF	GA	GD	Pts	Qualification
1	France	3	3	0	0	90	70	+20	6	Semifinals
2	Hungary	3	1	0	2	84	87	−3	2 (Note: Hungary 2Pts, +2GD; Slovenia 2Pts, +1GD; Sweden 2Pts, –3GD)	5–8th place semifinals
3	Slovenia	3	1	0	2	76	84	−8	2	
4	Sweden	3	1	0	2	82	91	−9	2	

Source: IHF
Notes:

29 January 2003; 18:30	Sweden	33–32	Hungary	Espinho; Referees: Boye, Jensen (DEN)
29 January 2003; 18:30		(17–17)		Espinho; Referees: Boye, Jensen (DEN)

29 January 2003; 20:30	France	31–22	Slovenia	Espinho; Referees: Breto, Huelin (ESP)
29 January 2003; 20:30		(14–11)		Espinho; Referees: Breto, Huelin (ESP)

30 January 2003; 18:30	Sweden	24–30	France	Espinho; Referees: Dolejš, Kohout (CZE)
30 January 2003; 18:30		(11–15)		Espinho; Referees: Dolejš, Kohout (CZE)

30 January 2003; 20:30	Slovenia	25–28	Hungary	Espinho; Referees: Boye, Jensen (DEN)
30 January 2003; 20:30		(10–13)		Espinho; Referees: Boye, Jensen (DEN)

== Final round ==
=== 5–8th place semifinals ===
1 February 2003
09:30
Yugoslavia
33–34 (ET)
Hungary
Pavilhão Atlântico, Lisbon
Referees: Baum, Góralczyk (POL)

(12–11)

FT: 25–25 ET: 2–2, 6–7

1 February 2003; 12:00	Iceland	27–30	Russia	Pavilhão Atlântico, Lisbon; Referees: Lemme, Ullrich (GER)
1 February 2003; 12:00		(12–13)		Pavilhão Atlântico, Lisbon; Referees: Lemme, Ullrich (GER)

=== Semifinals ===
1 February 2003; 15:00	Germany	23–22	France	Pavilhão Atlântico, Lisbon; Referees: Dolejš, Kohout (CZE)
1 February 2003; 15:00		(11–10)		Pavilhão Atlântico, Lisbon; Referees: Dolejš, Kohout (CZE)

1 February 2003
17:30
Spain
37–39 (ET)
Croatia
Pavilhão Atlântico, Lisbon
Referees: Arnaldsson, Viðarsson (ISL)

(14–9)

FT: 26–26 ET: 5–5, 6–8

=== 7th place game ===
2 February 2003; 11:30	Iceland	32–27	Yugoslavia	Pavilhão Atlântico, Lisbon; Referees: Bord, Buy (FRA)
2 February 2003; 11:30		(16–13)		Pavilhão Atlântico, Lisbon; Referees: Bord, Buy (FRA)

=== 5th place game ===
2 February 2003; 09:00	Russia	30–25	Hungary	Pavilhão Atlântico, Lisbon; Attendance: 3,000; Referees: Hansson, Olsson (SWE)
2 February 2003; 09:00		(16–11)		Pavilhão Atlântico, Lisbon; Attendance: 3,000; Referees: Hansson, Olsson (SWE)

=== Third place game ===
2 February 2003; 14:30	Spain	22–27	France	Pavilhão Atlântico, Lisbon; Attendance: 7,000; Referees: Goulão, Macau (POR)
2 February 2003; 14:30	Ortega 7	(11–16)	Narcisse 7	Pavilhão Atlântico, Lisbon; Attendance: 7,000; Referees: Goulão, Macau (POR)

=== Final ===
2 February 2003; 17:00	Croatia	34–31	Germany	Pavilhão Atlântico, Lisbon; Attendance: 12,000; Referees: Boye, Jensen (DEN)
2 February 2003; 17:00	Džomba 8	(20–18)	Baur 8	Pavilhão Atlântico, Lisbon; Attendance: 12,000; Referees: Boye, Jensen (DEN)

== Final standings ==
Rank	Team
Gold medal	Croatia
Silver medal	Germany
Bronze medal	France
4	Spain
5	Russia
6	Hungary
7	Iceland
8	Yugoslavia
9	Denmark
10	Poland
11	Slovenia
12	Portugal
13	Sweden
14	Tunisia
15	Egypt
16	Qatar
17	Argentina
18	Algeria
19	Saudi Arabia
20	Kuwait
21	Australia
22	Brazil
23	Morocco
24	Greenland

Qualified for the 2004 Summer Olympics
Ineligible to qualify for the Olympics: Greenland do not have a National Olympic Committee recognized by the IOC

2003 Men's World Champions

Croatia
First title

== Awards ==
MVP: (Germany) Christian Schwarzer

=== All Star Team ===
- Goalkeeper: (Germany) Henning Fritz
- Left Wing: (Russia) Eduard Koksharov
- Left Back: (Hungary) Carlos Pérez
- Center Back: (Spain) Enric Masip
- Pivot : (Germany) Christian Schwarzer
- Right Back: (France) Patrick Cazal
- Right Wing: (Croatia) Mirza Džomba

== Statistics ==
=== Top goalscorers ===
Rank	Name	Team	Goals
1	Carlos Pérez	Hungary	64
2	Hussein Zaky	Egypt	61
3	Ólafur Stefánsson	Iceland	58
4	László Nagy	Hungary	51
4	Aleksey Rastvortsev	Russia	51
6	Markus Baur	Germany	50
6	Ivan Simonovič	Slovenia	50
8	Stefan Kretzschmar	Germany	48
8	Florian Kehrmann	Germany	48
10	Petar Metličić	Croatia	46

=== Top goalkeepers ===
Rank	Name	Team	Saves	Shots	%
1	Andrey Lavrov	Russia	109	325	33.5
2	Henning Fritz	Germany	99	256	38.7
3	Arpad Sterbik	Yugoslavia	97	216	44.9
4	José Javier Hombrados	Spain	94	198	47.5
5	Nándor Fazekas	Hungary	88	231	38.1
6	Vlado Šola	Croatia	78	196	39.8
7	Dejan Perić	Yugoslavia	71	180	39.4
8	Sławomir Szmal	Poland	69	155	44.5
9	Beno Lapajne	Slovenia	68	188	36.2
10	Kasper Hvidt	Denmark	68	206	33.0

== Medalists ==
Gold	Silver	Bronze
Croatia: Mario Kelentrić; Nikša Kaleb; Renato Sulić; Ivano Balić; Božidar Jović; Blaženko Lacković; Vedran Zrnić; Igor Vori; Davor Dominiković; Denis Špoljarić; Mirza Džomba; Petar Metličić; Vlado Šola; Tonči Valčić; Slavko Goluža; Valter Matošević Head coach : Lino Červar	Germany: Henning Fritz; Pascal Hens; Mark Dragunski; Stefan Kretzschmar; Christian Rose; Jan-Olaf Immel; Christian Schwarzer; Klaus-Dieter Petersen; Steffen Weber; Volker Zerbe; Christian Ramota; Markus Baur; Christian Zeitz; Heiko Grimm; Florian Kehrmann; Carsten Lichtlein Head coach : Heiner Brand	France: Jérôme Fernandez; Didier Dinart; Cédric Burdet; Bertrand Gille; Christophe Kempe; Daniel Narcisse; Grégory Anquetil; Andrej Golic; Olivier Girault; Bruno Martini; François-Xavier Houlet; Thierry Omeyer; Jackson Richardson; Joël Abati; Patrick Cazal Head coach : Claude Onesta
