= EHF Euro Cup =

European handball competition

- Sport: Handball
- Founded: 2018
- No. of teams: 4
- Continent: Europe (EHF)
- Most recent champion: France (1st title)
- Most titles: France; Denmark; Hungary; Spain (1 title each)

EHF Euro Cup is a European handball competition for national teams, organized by the European Handball Federation (EHF).

Teams, that already automatically qualified for the next European Men's Handball Championship, play against each other in a four team group. The tournament is played at the same time as the qualifying process for the European Championships. The inaugural edition of the men's tournament was in 2020.

== Creation ==
The EHF supported the creation of the event at an EHF meeting in February 2017.

== Qualification ==
Four teams participate in this competition. Qualification depends on how many hosts/co-host there are. For example, if there are three co-hosts, then only the European Men's Handball Championship champions will tak.

== Summary ==
Years	Winners	Runners-up	Third	Fourth
2020	Spain	Norway	Sweden	Austria
2022	Hungary	Croatia	Spain	Slovakia
2024	Denmark	Sweden	Spain	Germany
2026	France	Denmark	Sweden	Norway

== Women's competition ==
After the introduction of the Men's event, the EHF decided to create a Women's version, starting in 2022.
