= Pavilhão Multiusos de Guimarães =

Arena in Guimarães, Portugal

Multiusos de Guimarães
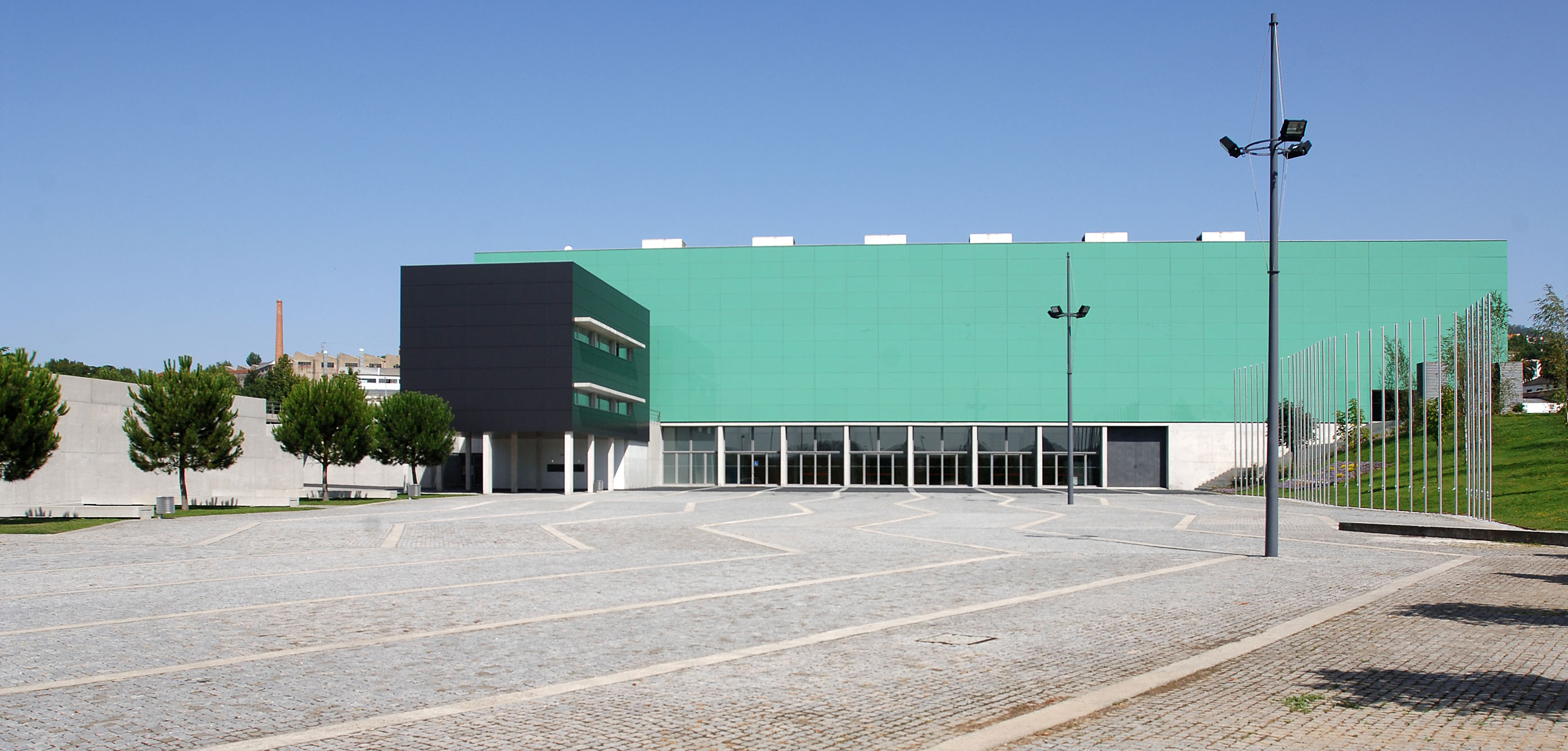
- Interactive map of Multiusos de Guimarães
- Full name: Pavilhão Multiusos de Guimarães
- Location: Guimarães, Portugal
- Coordinates: 41.4353°N 8.3063°W
- Capacity: 10,000 (standing); 7,603 (events); 3,592 (sports)

Construction
- Opened: 17 November 2001

Tenants
- Vitória de Guimarães (basketball); Vitória de Guimarães (volleyball)

Website
- Official website

Pavilhão Multiusos de Guimarães (also known as Multiusos de Guimarães) is a multi-purpose arena in the city of Guimarães, Portugal, and is one of several facilities in the Guimarães Sports City. The Nave António Magalhães, named in honour of the service rendered by the former mayor, has mainly been used to host fairs, exhibitions, congresses, concerts and sporting events since its inauguration on 17 November 2001.

== Construction ==
This architectural project designed by the Pitágoras Group has a total capacity of 7,603 seats, depending on the layout desired by the promoters, with 3,592 seats for sports events.

This building provides a variety of activities, with the large auditorium being able to be adapted for the different cultural and sporting events that take place there, and also has other support spaces such as 3 conference rooms, an area for the press, an entrance hall with public support services and a self-service restaurant.

== Events ==
It was selected by the broadcaster RTP as one of the possible candidates to host the final of the Eurovision Song Contest 2018 on Portuguese soil, but it was the stage for the grand final of the 2018 RTP Song Contest, on March 4, 2018, which elected the song O Jardim that would represent Portugal that same year.

== See also ==
- List of indoor arenas in Portugal
