= Handball at the 2024 Summer Olympics – Men's qualification =

The men's qualification for the Olympic handball tournament occurred between January 2023 and March 2024, assigning quota places to the twelve squads for the Games: the hosts, the world champion, four continental events winners (Africa, Europe, Asia and Oceania, and the Americas), and six teams from the IHF World Olympic qualifying tournaments, respectively.

== Summary ==
Qualification	Date	Host	Berths	Qualified team
Host nation	—	—	1	France
2023 World Championship	11–29 January 2023	Poland; Sweden	1	Denmark
2023 Asian Qualification Tournament	18–28 October 2023	(Qatar) Doha	1	Japan
2023 Pan American Games	30 October – 4 November 2023	(Chile) Viña del Mar	1	Argentina
2024 European Championship	10–28 January 2024	Germany	1	Sweden
2024 African Championship	17–27 January 2024	(Egypt) Cairo	1	Egypt
2024 IHF Men's Olympic Qualification Tournaments	14–17 March 2024	(Spain) Granollers	2	Spain; Slovenia
2024 IHF Men's Olympic Qualification Tournaments	14–17 March 2024	(Germany) Hanover	2	Croatia; Germany
2024 IHF Men's Olympic Qualification Tournaments	14–17 March 2024	(Hungary) Tatabánya	2	Norway; Hungary
Total			12	

== Legend ==
Qualified
Key	From	To
	Olympic host	2024 Summer Olympics
	2023 IHF World Championship	2024 Summer Olympics
	2022–2024 Continental Qualification Tournament	2024 Summer Olympics
	2023 IHF World Championship	2024 IHF World Olympic Qualification Tournament
	2022–2024 Continental Qualification Tournament	2024 IHF World Olympic Qualification Tournament

== Host country ==
- France

== World Championship ==
The world champion directly qualified for Olympics. Since host nation France took the silver medal, the next six best placed teams (teams ranked 3–8) were eligible to play at the Olympic Qualification Tournaments. If any team subsequently qualified directly for Olympics through their continental event, the list would be shifted to the ninth place (or thereafter).

Rank	Team
1st place, gold medalist(s)	Denmark
2nd place, silver medalist(s)	France
3rd place, bronze medalist(s)	Spain
4	Sweden
5	Germany
6	Norway
7	Egypt
8	Hungary
9	Croatia
10	Slovenia
11	Serbia
12	Iceland
13	Portugal
14	Netherlands
15	Poland
16	Bahrain
17	Brazil
18	Montenegro
19	Argentina
20	United States
21	Belgium
22	Qatar
23	Cape Verde
24	Iran
25	Tunisia
26	Chile
27	North Macedonia
28	South Korea
29	Saudi Arabia
30	Morocco
31	Algeria
32	Uruguay

== Continental qualification ==
=== Europe ===
Due to the European Championship final being contested between France and Denmark, two teams who had already qualified for the Olympic tournament (France as hosts, and Denmark as World Champions), the winner of the third-place match between Sweden and Germany secured the European Olympic berth. In addition, Portugal and Austria, the two best-placed teams not already qualified for Olympics or the Olympic Qualification Tournaments (via the 2023 World Championship), were eligible to play at the Olympic Qualification Tournaments.

Rank	Team
1st place, gold medalist(s)	France
2nd place, silver medalist(s)	Denmark
3rd place, bronze medalist(s)	Sweden
4	Germany
5	Hungary
6	Slovenia
7	Portugal
8	Austria
9	Norway
10	Iceland
11	Croatia
12	Netherlands
13	Spain
14	Montenegro
15	Czech Republic
16	Poland
17	North Macedonia
18	Georgia
19	Serbia
20	Faroe Islands
21	Switzerland
22	Romania
23	Greece
24	Bosnia and Herzegovina

Ineligible to qualify for the Olympics: Faroe Islands do not have a National Olympic Committee recognized by the IOC

=== Americas ===
The winner of the Pan American Games handball tournament directly qualified for the Olympics. The Olympic Qualification Tournaments berth was given to the Pan American Games handball tournament runner-up.

Rank	Team
1st place, gold medalist(s)	Argentina
2nd place, silver medalist(s)	Brazil
3rd place, bronze medalist(s)	Chile
4	United States
5	Uruguay
6	Cuba
7	Mexico
8	Dominican Republic

=== Asia ===
Eleven teams competed in the Asian qualification tournament, held at the Duhail Handball Sports Hall in Doha, Qatar, from 18 to 28 October 2023.

==== Final standings ====
Rank	Team
1st place, gold medalist(s)	Japan
2nd place, silver medalist(s)	Bahrain
3rd place, bronze medalist(s)	South Korea
4	Qatar
5	Iran
6	Saudi Arabia
7	Kuwait
8	United Arab Emirates
9	China
10	Kazakhstan
11	India

=== Africa ===
African champions directly qualified for Olympics. The Olympic Qualification Tournaments berth was given to the runners-up and third place.

Rank	Team
1st place, gold medalist(s)	Egypt
2nd place, silver medalist(s)	Algeria
3rd place, bronze medalist(s)	Tunisia
4	Cape Verde
5	Guinea
6	DR Congo
7	Morocco
8	Angola
9	Nigeria
10	Cameroon
11	Gabon
12	Libya
13	Congo
14	Rwanda
15	Kenya
16	Zambia

== Olympic Qualification Tournaments ==
=== Qualified teams ===
There were three qualifying tournaments. Only twelve eligible teams through the five events mentioned above qualified for these tournaments:

- The top six teams from the World championship that did not already qualify through their continental championships were eligible to participate in the tournament.
- The highest-ranked teams of each continent in the World championship represented the continent in order to determine the continental ranking. The first-ranked continent (Europe) received two more places for the tournament. The second (Africa), third (Asia), and fourth (Americas)-ranked continents received one place each. The last place belongs to a team from Oceania, if one was ranked between 8 and 12th at the World Championship. As no team from Oceania met this condition, the second-ranked continent received an extra place instead. The teams that already earned their places through their World championship ranking were not considered for receiving places through the continental criterion. In such cases, the access list was rebalanced accordingly.
- The twelve teams were allocated in three pools of four teams according to the table below. The top two teams from each pool qualified for the 2024 Olympic Games.

2024 Olympic Qualification Tournament #1	2024 Olympic Qualification Tournament #2	2024 Olympic Qualification Tournament #3
3rd from World: Spain; 10th from World: Slovenia; 2nd from Asia: Bahrain; 2nd from Americas: Brazil	5th from World: Germany; 9th from World: Croatia; 2nd from Africa: Algeria; 8th from Europe: Austria	6th from World: Norway; 8th from World: Hungary; 7th from Europe: Portugal; 3rd from Africa: Tunisia

The host countries were announced on 2 February 2024.

=== 2024 Olympic Qualification Tournament #1 ===
It was held from 14 to 17 March 2024 in Granollers, Spain.

Pos	Team	Pld	W	D	L	GF	GA	GD	Pts	Qualification
1	Spain (H)	3	3	0	0	99	75	+24	6	2024 Summer Olympics
2	Slovenia	3	2	0	1	81	84	−3	4	2024 Summer Olympics
3	Brazil	3	1	0	2	77	79	−2	2	
4	Bahrain	3	0	0	3	77	96	−19	0	

Source: IHF
Rules for classification: 1) Points; 2) Head-to-head points; 3) Head-to-head goal difference; 4) Head-to-head goals scored; 5) Goal difference; 6) Goals scored; 7) Draw.
(H) Hosts

=== 2024 Olympic Qualification Tournament #2 ===
It was held from 14 to 17 March 2024 in Hanover, Germany.

Pos	Team	Pld	W	D	L	GF	GA	GD	Pts	Qualification
1	Croatia	3	3	0	0	102	81	+21	6	2024 Summer Olympics
2	Germany (H)	3	2	0	1	105	93	+12	4	2024 Summer Olympics
3	Austria	3	1	0	2	101	95	+6	2	
4	Algeria	3	0	0	3	77	116	−39	0	

Source: IHF
Rules for classification: 1) Points; 2) Head-to-head points; 3) Head-to-head goal difference; 4) Head-to-head goals scored; 5) Goal difference; 6) Goals scored; 7) Draw.
(H) Hosts

=== 2024 Olympic Qualification Tournament #3 ===
It was held from 14 to 17 March 2024 in Tatabánya, Hungary.

Pos	Team	Pld	W	D	L	GF	GA	GD	Pts	Qualification
1	Norway	3	3	0	0	102	78	+24	6	2024 Summer Olympics
2	Hungary (H)	3	2	0	1	88	80	+8	4	2024 Summer Olympics
3	Portugal	3	1	0	2	93	91	+2	2	
4	Tunisia	3	0	0	3	77	111	−34	0	

Source: IHF
Rules for classification: 1) Points; 2) Head-to-head points; 3) Head-to-head goal difference; 4) Head-to-head goals scored; 5) Goal difference; 6) Goals scored; 7) Draw.
(H) Hosts

== See also ==
- Handball at the 2024 Summer Olympics – Women's qualification
