= Madeira Tecnopolo =

Science park in Madeira, Portugal

Madeira Tecnopolo is a science park in Funchal, Madeira, Portugal, 32°39′35″N 16°55′34″W.

== ICEC Centre ==
Within the Tecnopolo park is the ICEC Exhibition and Congress Centre, the largest indoor arena on the island. As well as various conferences and exhibitions, including Portugal Fashion, it has also held events such as the 2003 World Men's Handball Championship and a Harlem Globetrotters match. The arena can hold up to 2,500 people for sports events.
