= Eger-Eszterházy SzSE =

Hungarian handball club

QHB-Eger
- Full name: Eger-Eszterházy Szabadidő és Sportegyesület
- Short name: Eger
- Arena: Kemény Ferenc Sportcsarnok, Eger
- Capacity: 885 seats
- Head coach: József Padla
- Captain: Gergő Kiss
- League: Nemzeti Bajnokság I
- Club colours
Home	Away

Eger-Eszterházy SzSE (Hungarian: Eger-Eszterházy Szabadidő és Sportegyesület), currently known as QHB-Eger for sponsorship reasons, is a Hungarian handball club from Eger, that plays in the Nemzeti Bajnokság I, the top level championship in Hungary.

Location of QHB-Eger

== Crest, colours, supporters ==
=== Naming history ===
Name	Period
Egri KC	−2002
SHS Eger SE	2002–2010
Eger Eszterházy SE	2010–2011
SBS Eger Eszterházy SZSE	2011–2015
SBS-Eger Eszterházy	2015–2018
DVTK-Eger	2018–2019
SBS-Eger	2019–2022
QHB-Eger	2022–present

=== Club crest ===
Old Logo
(-2022)

=== Kit manufacturers ===
Period	Kit manufacturer
2011	(Denmark) Hummel
2011 - 2015	(Germany) Adidas
2015 - 2017	(Germany) Erima
2017 - 2018	(Denmark) Hummel
2018 - 2019	(Hungary) 2Rule
2019 - 2022	(Denmark) Hummel
2022 - present	(Germany) Erima

=== Kits ===
HOME
2011–13	2013–15	2017–18	2Rule; 2018–19	2019–20	2020–21	2021–22	2022–26

AWAY
2011–13	2013–14	2017–18	2Rule; 2018–19	2019–20	2020–21	2021–22	2022–25

THIRD
2017–18	2019–20	2020–21	2021–22	2022–23

== Sports Hall information ==
- Name: – Kemény Ferenc Sportcsarnok
- City: – Eger
- Capacity: – 885
- Address: – 3300 Eger, Stadion utca 8.

== Management ==
Position	Name
President	(Hungary) Róbert Szabó
Executive Director	(Hungary) Mihály Pereverzia
Technical director	(Hungary) (Slovakia) Péter Szabó
Technical manager	(Hungary) István Ács
Replacement Technical Leader	(Hungary) Boldizsár Szécsi
Youth Leader	(Hungary) Tibor Hegedűs
Head Of Communications	(Hungary) Károly Sike

== Team ==
=== Current squad ===
Squad for the 2026–27 season

QHB-Eger

Goalkeepers

- 12 (Hungary) Dávid Szabad
- 55 (Hungary) Gergő Miklós
- 79 (Hungary) Arnold Harman

Left Wingers

- 17 (Hungary) Péter Martinovics
- 30 (Hungary) Máté Száva
- 44 (Hungary) Alex Katona

Right Wingers

- 6 (Hungary) Kevin Rozner
- 33 (Hungary) Zalán Gulyás

Line Players

- 11 (Hungary) Gergő Spekhardt
- 22 (Hungary) Márton Juhász
- 34 (Hungary) Donát Ducsai
- 52 (Hungary) Bence Kaposvári

Central Backs

- 66 (Hungary) Szabolcs Kovács

Left Backs

- 4 (Hungary) Gergő Kiss (c)
- 7 (Hungary) Bence Barta
- 15 (Hungary) Dávid Nkousa
- 21 (Hungary) Dániel Fercsik
- 77 (Hungary) Bálint Szabó

Right Backs

- 5 (Hungary) Kristóf Sikler
- 13 (Hungary) Máté Kurucz

=== Technical staff ===
- Head coach: (Hungary) József Padla
- Assistant coach: (Hungary) Tibor Hegedüs
- Goalkeeping coach: (Hungary) Gábor György
- Fitness coach: (Hungary) Máté Molnár
- Masseur: (Hungary) Balázs Hudák
- Club doctor: (Hungary) Dr. Miklós Fónagy

=== Transfers ===
Transfers for the 2026–27 season

Joining

- (Hungary) Máté Száva (LW) from (Hungary) Budakalász FKC
- (Hungary) Máté Kurucz (RB) from (Hungary) Debreceni EAC
- (Hungary) Szabolcs Kovács (CB) from (Hungary) Békési FKC
- (Hungary) Kevin Rozner (RW) from (Hungary) Ceglédi KKSE
- (Hungary) Bence Kaposvári (LP) on loan from (Hungary) Ceglédi KKSE

Leaving

- (Hungary) Borisz Dörnyei (RW) to (Hungary) Dabas KK
- (Hungary) Ádám Bodnár (CB) to (Hungary) Vecsés SE
- (Hungary) Zsombor Török-Vida (LP) to (Hungary) Debreceni EAC
- (Hungary) Dominik Bőti (LW) to (Hungary) Várpalotai BSK
- (Hungary) Mihály Moravszki (LP)

Transfers for the 2025–26 season

Joining

- (Hungary) Gergő Miklós (GK) from (Finland) Riihimäki Cocks
- (Hungary) Alex Katona (LW) from (Hungary) Dabas KK
- (Hungary) Borisz Dörnyei (RW) from (Hungary) Győri ETO-UNI FKC
- (Hungary) Kristóf Sikler (RB) from (Hungary) Győri ETO-UNI FKC
- (Hungary) Gergő Spekhardt (LP) from (Hungary) Budai Farkasok KKUK
- (Hungary) Dávid Szabad (GK) from (Hungary) Budai Farkasok KKUK
- (Hungary) Ádám Bodnár (CB) from (Hungary) KK Ajka
- (Hungary) Zsombor Török-Vida (LP) from (Hungary) Veszprémi KKFT
- (Hungary) Dávid Nkousa (LB) from (Hungary) Diósgyőri VTK
- (Hungary) Dániel Fercsik (LB) from (Hungary) Veszprémi KKFT

Leaving

- (Algeria) Abdeldjalil Zennadi (LP) to (Hungary) Carbonex-Komló
- (Iran) Reza Yadegari (LB) to (Turkey) Nilüfer Belediyespor
- (Turkey) Özgür Sarak (RB) to (Turkey) Spor Toto SK
- (Serbia) Nikola Arsenić (CB)
- (Hungary) Áron Lezák (RW) to (Hungary) Ózdi KC
- (Hungary) Olivér Szöllősi (LP) to (Hungary) Carbonex-Komló
- (Hungary) Barnabás Marczika (GK) to (Hungary) HE-DO B. Braun Gyöngyös
- (Hungary) Brunó Bajus (LW) to (Hungary) HE-DO B. Braun Gyöngyös
- (Hungary) Áron Ágoston (GK) to (Hungary) Carbonex-Komló
- (Hungary) Zalán Maracskó (RW) to (Hungary) Csurgói KK
- (Hungary) Tamás Tóvizi (LB) to (Hungary) Szigetszentmiklósi KSK
- (Hungary) Máté Száva (LW) to (Hungary) Budakalász FKC
- (Hungary) Károly Tóth (CB) to (Hungary) Komárom VSE
- (Hungary) Huba Czabula (CB) to (Hungary) Ferencvárosi TC

Transfers for the 2024–25 season

Joining

- (Serbia) Nikola Arsenić (CB) from (Turkey) Beşiktaş JK
- (Turkey) Özgür Sarak (RB) from (Turkey) Spor Toto SK
- (Hungary) Olivér Szöllősi (LP) from (Hungary) Carbonex-Komló
- (Hungary) Dominik Bőti (LW) from (Hungary) BFKA-Veszprém
- (Hungary) Huba Czabula (CB) from (Hungary) BFKA-Veszprém
- (Iran) Reza Yadegari (LB) from (Hungary) MOL Tatabánya KC

Leaving

- (Poland) Bartosz Nastaj (RB) to (Poland) Śląsk Wrocław
- (Portugal) Francisco Oliveira Silva (LB) to (North Macedonia) RK Alkaloid
- (Hungary) Balázs Boros (RB) to (Hungary) PLER-Budapest
- (Hungary) Mátyás Kavin (CB) to (Hungary) PLER-Budapest
- (Hungary) Szabolcs Döme (LP) to (Hungary) Ceglédi KKSE
- (Hungary) Patrik Juhász (CB)

Transfers for the 2023–24 season

Joining

- (Algeria) Abdeldjalil Zennadi (LP) from (Hungary) Budai Farkasok KKUK
- (Poland) Bartosz Nastaj (RB) from (Poland) MMTS Kwidzyn
- (Portugal) Francisco Oliveira Silva (LB) from (Spain) BM Guadalajara
- (Hungary) Zalán Maracskó (RW) from (Hungary) Budakalász FKC
- (Hungary) Brunó Bajus (LW) from (Hungary) Pick Szeged
- (Hungary) Mátyás Kavin (CB) from (Hungary) Vecsés SE
- (Hungary) Balázs Boros (RB) from (Hungary) PLER-Budapest
- (Angola) Romé Hebo (CB) from (Austria) UHC Hollabrunn

Leaving

- (Hungary) Máté Kurucz (RB) to (Hungary) Győri ETO-UNI FKC
- (Hungary) András Schekk (LB) to (Hungary) Tatai AC
- (Hungary) Kevin Rozner (RW) to (Hungary) Ózdi KC
- (Hungary) János Kepess (LW) to (Hungary) Békési FKC
- (Hungary) Ádám Kerezsi (LB) to (Hungary) Debreceni EAC
- (Hungary) Dominik Vrhovina (LP) loan back to (Hungary) Budakalász FKC
- (Hungary) Roland Fórizs (LB) loan back to (Hungary) Budakalász FKC
- (Angola) Romé Hebo (CB)

Transfers for the 2022–23 season

Joining

- (Hungary) Károly Tóth (CB) from (Hungary) Orosházi FKSE
- (Hungary) Szabolcs Döme (LP) from (Hungary) Orosházi FKSE
- (Hungary) András Gönczi (LP) from (Hungary) Orosházi FKSE
- (Hungary) Máté Kurucz (RB) from (Hungary) Fejér B.Á.L. Veszprém
- (Hungary) Barnabás Marczika (GK) from (Hungary) Pick Szeged
- (Hungary) Áron Ágoston (GK) from (Hungary) Balatonfüredi KSE
- (Hungary) András Schekk (LB) from (Hungary) PLER KC
- (Hungary) Kevin Rozner (RW) from (Hungary) PLER KC
- (Hungary) János Kepess (LW) from (Hungary) NEKA
- (Hungary) Dominik Vrhovina (LP) on loan from (Hungary) Budakalász FKC
- (Hungary) Roland Fórizs (LB) on loan from (Hungary) Budakalász FKC

Leaving

- (Lithuania) Rolandas Bernatonis (LB) to (Spain) BM Benidorm
- (Slovakia) Šimon Macháč (LP) to (Hungary) Fejér B.Á.L. Veszprém
- (Hungary) Tibor Balogh (GK) to (Hungary) Fejér B.Á.L. Veszprém
- (Hungary) Gábor Pulay (RB) to (Hungary) Fejér B.Á.L. Veszprém
- (Hungary) Balázs Molnár (LW) to (Hungary) Fejér B.Á.L. Veszprém
- (Iran) Sajjad Esteki (LB) to (Romania) CSM Bacău
- (Argentina) Franco Gavidia (LP) to (Germany) TSV Blaustein
- (Hungary) Rajmond Tóth (CB) to (Hungary) Budakalász FKC
- (Hungary) Máté Lakosy (RW) to (Hungary) HE-DO B. Braun Gyöngyös
- (Hungary) Lev Szuharev (RB) to (Hungary) Sport36-Komló
- (Hungary) Noel Szepesi (LP) to (Hungary) Ózdi KC
- (Hungary) Bence Bettembuk (LP) to (Hungary) Ózdi KC
- (Hungary) Bence Seprős (GK)
- (Hungary) Márk Kovács (LP) to (Romania) CSM Oradea

Transfers for the 2021–22 season

Joining

- (Hungary) Gábor Pulay (RB) from (Hungary) Balatonfüredi KSE
- (Hungary) Bence Seprős (GK) from (Hungary) Balatonfüredi KSE
- (Hungary) Máté Lakosy (RW) from (Hungary) ETO-SZESE Győr
- (Hungary) Balázs Molnár (LW) from (Hungary) Grundfos Tatabánya KC
- (Argentina) Franco Gavidia (LP) from (Spain) BM Iberoquinoa Antequera
- (Iran) Sajjad Esteki (LB) from Al-Arabi SC (Kuwait)

Leaving

- (Hungary) Péter Schmid (CB) to (Hungary) Budakalász FKC
- (Hungary) István Rédei (RB) to (Hungary) Debreceni EAC
- (Hungary) Péter Carlos Moscoso (GK) to (Hungary) Ózdi KC
- (Hungary) Tibor Mándy (RW) to (Hungary) Komárom VSE

Transfers for the 2020–21 season

Joining

- (Hungary) Lev Szuharev (RB) from (Hungary) Telekom Veszprém
- (Hungary) Tibor Balogh (GK) from (Hungary) Dabas KK
- (Hungary) Márk Kovács (LP) from (Slovenia) MRD Dobova
- (Hungary) Bence Holdosi (LW) from (Hungary) Ferencvárosi TC
- (Hungary) Tamás Tóvizi (LB) from (Hungary) Balatonfüredi KSE
- (Slovakia) Šimon Macháč (LP) from (Czech Republic) Talent Plzeň

Leaving

- (North Macedonia) Jane Cvetkovski (GK) to (North Macedonia) RK Tineks Prolet
- (Hungary) Dániel Füzi (LP) to (Hungary) Ferencvárosi TC
- (Hungary) Balázs Molnár (LW) to (Hungary) Grundfos Tatabánya KC
- (Hungary) Attila Tóth (RB) to (Hungary) Veszprém KKFT Felsőörs
- (Slovakia) Gabriel Papp (LP) (retires)
- (Hungary) Dávid Hajas (LP) to (Hungary) Pécsi EAC
- (Hungary) Dominik Péter (LW) to (Hungary) Debreceni EAC
- (Serbia) Darko Stevanović (LB) loan back to (Hungary) Balatonfüredi KSE

Transfers for the 2019–20 season

Joining

- (North Macedonia) Jane Cvetkovski (GK) from (Germany) HSG Wetzlar
- (Slovakia) Gabriel Papp (LP) from (Slovakia) HC Sporta Hlohovec
- (Hungary) Attila Tóth (RB) from (Hungary) Veszprém KKFT Felsőörs
- (Hungary) Máté Száva (LW) from (Hungary) Ózdi KC
- (Hungary) Tibor Mándy (RW) from (Hungary) Grundfos Tatabánya KC
- (Serbia) Darko Stevanović (LB) on loan from (Hungary) Balatonfüredi KSE

Leaving

- (Slovenia) Gregor Lorger (GK) to (Slovenia) RK Maribor Branik
- (Hungary) Márk Hegedűs (LP) to (Hungary) Gyöngyösi KK
- (Hungary) Bence Takács (CB) to (Hungary) Sport36-Komló
- (Hungary) Péter Vaskó (RW)) to (Hungary) Sport36-Komló
- (Hungary) István Szepesi (LW) to (Hungary) Ceglédi KKSE
- (Hungary) Ádám Bajorhegyi (LB) to (Hungary) FKSE Algyő
- (Hungary) Zsolt Dobó (LB) to (Hungary) Nyíregyházi SC
- (Hungary) Dániel Repóth (GK) to (Hungary) Budai Farkasok KKUK

Transfers for the 2018–19 season

Joining

- (Lithuania) Rolandas Bernatonis (LB) from (Spain) BM Granollers
- (Hungary) István Rédei (RB) from (France) JS Cherbourg
- (Slovenia) Gregor Lorger (GK) from (Germany) ASV Hamm-Westfalen
- (Hungary) Balázs Molnár (LW) from (Hungary) Telekom Veszprém
- (Hungary) Márk Hegedűs (LP) from (Hungary) MOL-Pick Szeged
- (Hungary) Péter Schmid (CB) from (Switzerland) HS Biel

Leaving

- (Slovakia) Richard Štochl (GK) (retires)
- (Slovakia) Radoslav Antl (LW) to (Slovakia) Košice Crows
- (Slovakia) Andrej Petro (LP) to (Slovakia) HKM Sala
- (Russia) Inal Aflitulin (CB) to (Russia) CSKA Moscow
- (Montenegro) Igor Radojević (RB) to (Russia) CSKA Moscow
- (Hungary) (Slovakia) Péter Szabó (LB) (retires)
- (Hungary) Dominik Nagy (GK) to (Hungary) Ózdi KC

Transfers for the 2017–18 season

Joining

- (Hungary) István Szepesi (LW) from (Hungary) Mezőkövesdi KC
- (Hungary) Péter Vaskó (RW) from (Hungary) Mezőkövesdi KC
- (Hungary) Dominik Nagy (GK) from (Hungary) NEKA

Leaving

- (Ukraine) Viacheslav Sadovyi (LB) to (Romania) HC Odorheiu Secuiesc
- (Hungary) Csaba Kocsis (LP) to (Hungary) Ózdi KC
- (Hungary) János Vancsics (RW) to (Hungary) FKSE Algyő
- (Hungary) Máté Menyhárt (LW) to (Hungary) Mezőkövesdi KC

Transfers for the 2016–17 season

Joining

- (Slovakia) Richard Štochl (GK) from (Slovakia) HK Agro Tapolčany
- (Montenegro) Igor Radojević (RB) from (Israel) Maccabi Avishai Motzkin
- (Brazil) Fernando Skrebsky Dutra (CB) from (Portugal) SC Horta
- (Hungary) Rajmond Tóth (CB) from (Hungary) Kecskeméti TE
- (Russia) Inal Aflitulin (CB) from (Hungary) Telekom Veszprém
- (Hungary) Dániel Füzi (LP) from (Hungary) Telekom Veszprém
- (Ukraine) Viacheslav Sadovyi (LB) from (Slovakia) HT Tatran Prešov

Leaving

- (Czech Republic) Alexander Radčenko (CB) to (Slovakia) HT Tatran Prešov
- (Romania) Adrian Radulescu (GK) to (Turkey) Adiyaman
- (Hungary) Ádám Iváncsik (LW) to (Hungary) Szigetszentmiklósi KSK
- (Hungary) János Kovács (GK) to (Hungary) Mezőkövesdi KC
- (Hungary) József Padla (RB) to (Hungary) Ózdi KC
- (Hungary) Balázs Szűcs (LW) to (Hungary) Ózdi KC
- (Brazil) Fernando Skrebsky Dutra (CB) to (Brazil) Carajás HC

Transfers for the 2015–16 season

Joining

- (Romania) Adrian Radulescu (GK) from (Norway) Strindheim IL
- (Hungary) Bence Takács (CB) from (Hungary) Ceglédi KKSE
- (Hungary) Ádám Bajorhegyi (LB) from (Germany) HC Elbflorenz Dresden
- (Hungary) Ádám Iváncsik (LW) from (Hungary) Gyöngyösi KK
- (North Macedonia) Vasko Dimitrovski (LP) from (North Macedonia) RK Prilep
- (Hungary) Noel Szepesi (LP) from (Hungary) Pásztói KC
- (Slovakia) Radoslav Antl (LW) from (Slovakia) HT Tatran Prešov
- (Slovakia) Andrej Petro (LP) from (Slovakia) HT Tatran Prešov
- (Czech Republic) Alexander Radčenko (CB) from (Slovakia) HT Tatran Prešov

Leaving

- (Hungary) Máté Halász (LB) to (Austria) HSG Bärnbach/Köflach
- (North Macedonia) Vasko Dimitrovski (LP) to (North Macedonia) RK Eurofarm Pelister 2

== Previous squads ==
2017–2018 Team
Shirt No	Nationality	Player	Birth Date	Position
1	Hungary	Dániel Repóth	11 June 1990 (age 36)	Goalkeeper
4	Hungary	Gergő Kiss	14 January 1991 (age 35)	Left Back
5	Hungary	István Szepesi	25 February 1990 (age 36)	Left Winger
6	Hungary	Péter Vaskó	16 July 1995 (age 31)	Right Winger
7	HungarySlovakia	Péter Szabó	29 July 1982 (age 44)	Left Back
10	Hungary	Áron Lezák	17 April 1992 (age 34)	Right Winger
11	Hungary	Ádám Bajorhegyi	17 November 1980 (age 45)	Left Back
12	Slovakia	Richard Štochl	17 December 1975 (age 50)	Goalkeeper
13	Russia	Inal Aflitulin	22 March 1988 (age 38)	Central Back
16	Hungary	Dominik Nagy	1 October 1998 (age 27)	Goalkeeper
22	Montenegro	Igor Radojević	25 June 1990 (age 36)	Right Back
23	Hungary	Bence Takács	1 November 1990 (age 35)	Central Back
28	Hungary	Zsolt Dobó	29 October 1986 (age 39)	Left Back
77	Hungary	Dániel Füzi	9 August 1996 (age 30)	Line Player
82	Slovakia	Radoslav Antl	2 March 1978 (age 48)	Left Winger
85	Slovakia	Andrej Petro	28 January 1986 (age 40)	Line Player
92	Hungary	Noel Szepesi	17 November 2000 (age 25)	Line Player
94	Hungary	Rajmond Tóth	6 April 2001 (age 25)	Central Back

2015–2016 Team
Shirt No	Nationality	Player	Birth Date	Position
1	Hungary	Dániel Repóth	11 June 1990 (age 36)	Goalkeeper
3	Hungary	Balázs Szűcs	28 March 1989 (age 37)	Left Winger
4	Hungary	Gergő Kiss	14 January 1991 (age 35)	Left Back
5	Hungary	Ádám Iváncsik	20 June 1990 (age 36)	Left Winger
6	Hungary	Máté Halász	2 June 1984 (age 42)	Left Back
7	HungarySlovakia	Péter Szabó	29 July 1982 (age 44)	Left Back
8	Hungary	Dávid Szilágyi	1 September 1993 (age 33)	Line Player
9	North Macedonia	Vasko Dimitrovski	9 October 1982 (age 43)	Line Player
10	Hungary	Áron Lezák	17 April 1992 (age 34)	Right Winger
11	Hungary	Ádám Bajorhegyi	17 November 1980 (age 45)	Left Back
12	Hungary	János Kovács	13 March 1984 (age 42)	Goalkeeper
13	Hungary	János Vancsics	13 February 1986 (age 40)	Right Winger
15	Czech Republic	Alexander Radčenko	5 July 1973 (age 53)	Central Back
17	Hungary	Csaba Kocsis	1 October 1985 (age 40)	Line Player
18	Hungary	József Padla	23 August 1985 (age 41)	Right Back
23	Hungary	Bence Takács	1 November 1990 (age 35)	Central Back
28	Hungary	Zsolt Dobó	29 October 1986 (age 39)	Left Back
31	Hungary	Botond Zelei	18 December 1997 (age 28)	Central Back
33	Hungary	Máté Menyhárt	3 March 1995 (age 31)	Left Winger
82	Slovakia	Radoslav Antl	2 March 1978 (age 48)	Left Winger
85	Slovakia	Andrej Petro	28 January 1986 (age 40)	Line Player
99	Romania	Adrian Radulescu	8 July 1986 (age 40)	Goalkeeper

2014–2015 Team
Shirt No	Nationality	Player	Birth Date	Position
1	Hungary	Dániel Repóth	11 June 1990 (age 36)	Goalkeeper
3	Hungary	Balázs Szűcs	28 March 1989 (age 37)	Left Winger
4	Hungary	Gergő Kiss	14 January 1991 (age 35)	Left Back
6	Hungary	Máté Halász	2 June 1984 (age 42)	Left Back
7	HungarySlovakia	Péter Szabó	29 July 1982 (age 44)	Left Back
8	Hungary	Dávid Szilágyi	1 September 1993 (age 33)	Line Player
9	Hungary	Botond Zelei	18 December 1997 (age 28)	Central Back
10	Hungary	Áron Lezák	17 April 1992 (age 34)	Right Winger
12	Hungary	János Kovács	13 March 1984 (age 42)	Goalkeeper
13	Hungary	János Vancsics	13 February 1986 (age 40)	Right Winger
14	Hungary	Gábor Éliás	20 December 1994 (age 31)	Central Back
14	Hungary	Gábor Péter	20 September 1999 (age 26)	Left Back
17	Hungary	Csaba Kocsis	1 October 1985 (age 40)	Line Player
18	Hungary	József Padla	23 August 1985 (age 41)	Right Back
28	Hungary	Zsolt Dobó	29 October 1986 (age 39)	Left Back
33	Hungary	Máté Menyhárt	3 March 1995 (age 31)	Left Winger
99	Hungary	Emil Tóth	30 December 1988 (age 37)	Line Player

== Top scorers ==
Season	Player	Apps/Goals
2006–2007	(Hungary) Tamás Lakatos	22/212
2007–2008	(Hungary) Tamás Lakatos	21/197
2008–2009	(Hungary) Tamás Lakatos	15/117
2009–2010	(Hungary) Tamás Lakatos	21/138
2010–2011	(Hungary) Péter Drizner	26/144
2011–2012	(Hungary) Péter Drizner	24/111
2012–2013	(Hungary) József Padla	22/164
2013–2014	(Hungary) (Slovakia) Péter Szabó	26/163
2014–2015	(Hungary) (Slovakia) Péter Szabó	22/127
2015–2016	(Slovakia) Radoslav Antl	20/129
2016–2017	(Slovakia) Radoslav Antl	26/137
2017–2018	(Russia) Inal Aflitulin	23/105
2018–2019	(Lithuania) Rolandas Bernatonis	23/109
2019–2020	Cancelled	
2020–2021	(Hungary) Áron Lezák	26/134
2021–2022	(Slovakia) Šimon Macháč	26/110
2021–2022	(Hungary) Máté Kurucz	30/152

== Honours ==
Honours		No.	Years
League
Nemzeti Bajnokság I/B	Winners	1	2014–15
Nemzeti Bajnokság I/B	Runners-up	1	2013–14

== Recent seasons ==
As of 6 May 2018.

- Seasons in Nemzeti Bajnokság I: 4
- Seasons in Nemzeti Bajnokság I/B: 4
- Seasons in Nemzeti Bajnokság II: 5

Season	Division	Pos.	Magyar kupa
2006–07	NB II Északkelet	5th	
2007–08	NB II Északkelet	3rd	
2008–09	NB II Kelet	2nd	
2009–10	NB II Kelet	4th	
2010–11	NB II Kelet	2nd	

Season	Division	Pos.	Magyar kupa
2011–12	NB I/B Kelet	8th	
2012–13	NB I/B Kelet	5th	
2013–14	NB I/B Kelet	2nd	
2014–15	NB I/B Kelet	1st	
2015–16	NB I	13th	Round 2

Season	Division	Pos.	Magyar kupa
2016–17	NB I	9th	Round 3
2017–18	NB I	9th	Round 4
2018–19	NB I	10th	Round 4
2019–20	NB I	Cancelled	
2020–21	NB I	8th	Round 4
2021–22	NB I	13th	Round 5

== EHF ranking ==
As of 14/07/2022

Rank	Team	Points
226	(Spain) BM Puente Genil	9
227	(Kosovo) KH Trepca	9
228	(Bulgaria) HC Osam Lovech	9
229	(Hungary) QHB-Eger	9
230	(Bosnia and Herzegovina) RK Vogošća	9
231	(Ukraine) Motor-Polytechnyka	9
232	(Denmark) SønderjyskE Håndbold	9

== Former club members ==
=== Notable former players ===
- (Hungary) Ádám Bajorhegyi
- (Hungary) Máté Halász
- (Hungary) Márk Hegedűs
- (Hungary) Ádám Iváncsik
- (Hungary) Dániel Füzi
- (Hungary) Balázs Molnár
- (Hungary) Gábor Pálos
- (Hungary) István Rédei
- (Hungary) (Slovakia) Péter Szabó
- (Hungary) István Szepesi
- (Hungary) Attila Tóth
- (Algeria) Abdeldjalil Zennadi
- (Brazil) Fernando Skrebsky Dutra
- (Czech Republic) Alexander Radčenko
- (Lithuania) Rolandas Bernatonis
- (North Macedonia) Jane Cvetkovski
- (North Macedonia) Vasko Dimitrovski
- (Montenegro) Igor Radojević
- (Romania) Adrian Radulescu
- (Russia) Inal Aflitulin
- (Slovenia) Gregor Lorger
- (Serbia) Darko Stevanović
- (Slovakia) Radoslav Antl
- (Slovakia) Šimon Macháč
- (Slovakia) Gabriel Papp
- (Slovakia) Andrej Petro
- (Slovakia) Richard Štochl
- (Ukraine) Viacheslav Sadovyi

=== Former coaches ===
Seasons	Coach	Country
2014–2016	István Rosta	(Hungary)
2016–	Edmond Tóth	(Hungary)
