= Kolpak =

Kolpak may refer to:

- Kolpak ruling, a European Court of Justice decision involving Maros Kolpak that set a precedent about foreigners in professional sports
- Kolpak (hat), a hat worn by Byzantine Catholic clergy
- an alternate spelling of kalpak, a type of hat worn throughout Central Asia and the Caucasus

== People with the surname ==
- Maros Kolpak (born 1971), Slovak handball player
- Sydir Kovpak (1887–1967), Soviet partisan leader in Ukraine during World War II

== See also ==
- Kolpik, a Hasidic fur hat
