= Jane Cvetkovski =

Macedonian handball player

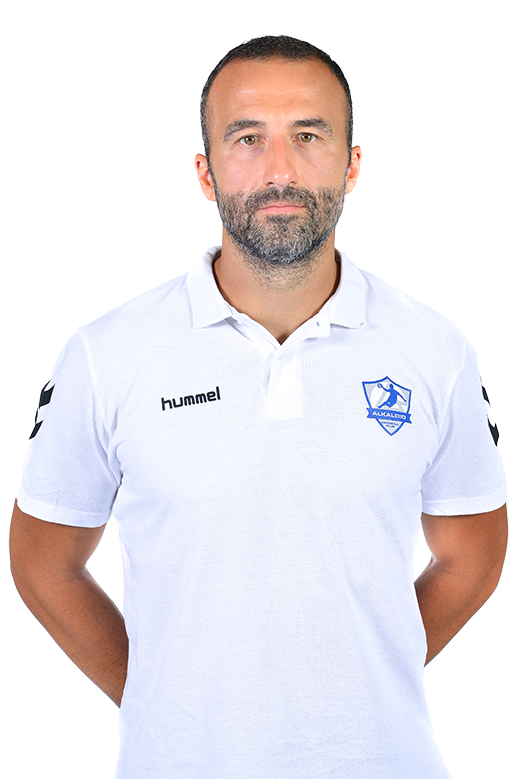

Personal information
- Nationality: Macedonian
- Born: 29 August 1987 (age 39) Skopje, Macedonia
- Height: 1.91 m (6 ft 3 in)

Sport
- Sport: Handball
- Position: Goalkeeper

Senior clubs
- Years: Team
- 2007–2014: RK Tineks Prolet
- 2014–2015: HK agro Topoľčany
- 2015–2016: RK Bosna Sarajevo
- 2016–2017: OV Helsingborg HK
- 2017–2018: Ystads IF
- 2018–2019: HSG Wetzlar
- 2018–2019: HSG Wetzlar U23
- 2019–2020: DVTK-Eger
- 2021–2022: RK Tineks Prolet
- 2022–2023: RK Alkaloid

Jane Cvetkovski (Macedonian: Јане Цветковски) (born 29 August 1987) is a Macedonian retired handball player. In 2014, he played with HK agro Topoľčany.
