= List of Kolpak cricketers =

Citizens of countries with free trade treaties with the EU, were eligible for signing Kolpak deals. European Union Agreement in force Agreement (in part) provisionally applied

The Kolpak ruling was made on 8 May 2003 in favour of Slovak handball player Maroš Kolpak, by the European Court of Justice. Maroš Kolpak had lost his contract with German handball club TSV Ostringen, as his team already had two non-EU players. Kolpak appealed to the European Court of Justice, claiming that he should not be considered as a non-EU player as he was a German resident, and Slovakia was part of the European Union Association Agreement. The court ruled in favour of Kolpak, and allowed citizens of countries that had free trade treaties with the EU, and were part of European Union Association Agreements, to work in any EU country. In March 2004, South African cricketer Claude Henderson became the first player to sign a Kolpak agreement, which ended his international career.

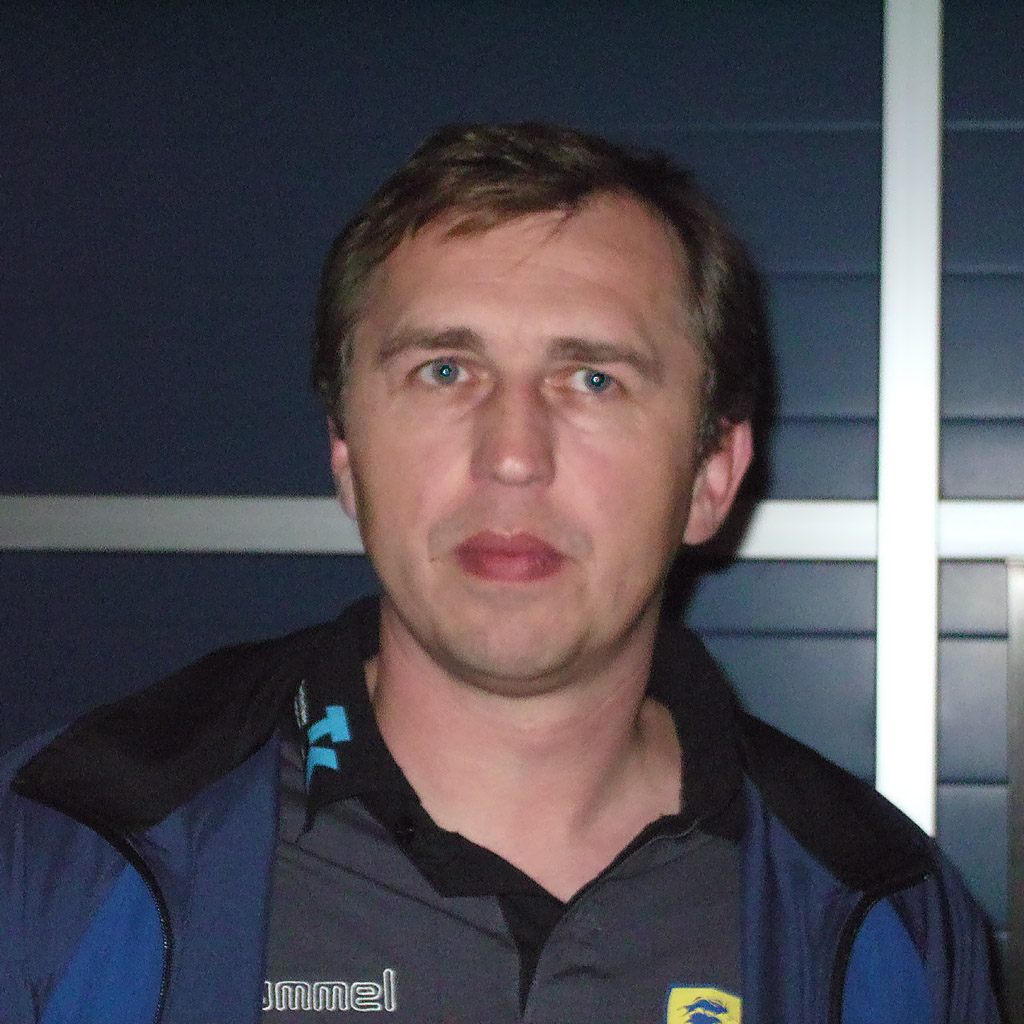
Maroš Kolpak, who lends his name to the ruling.

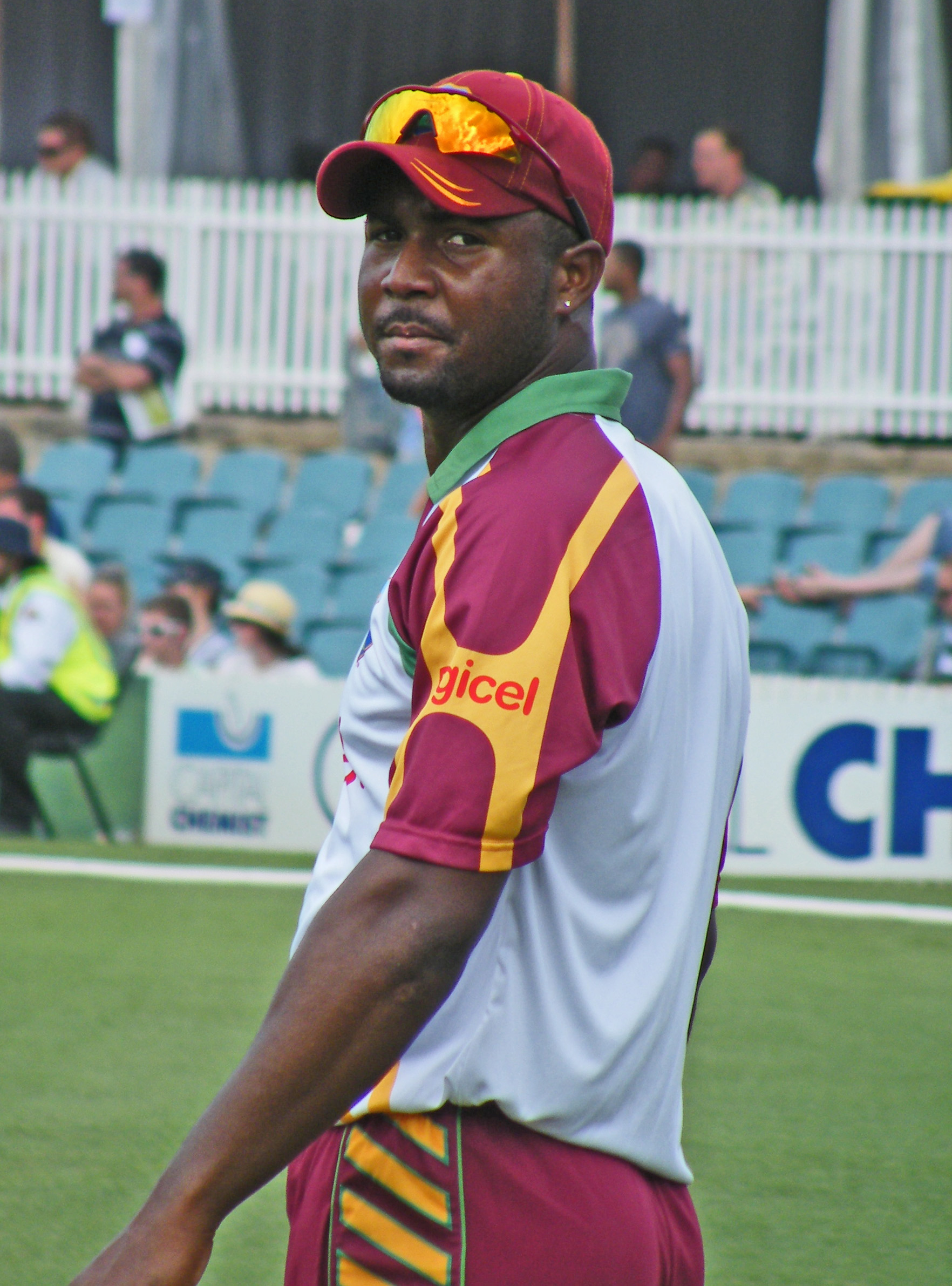
Dwayne Smith was a Kolpak player for Sussex until 2010.

The ruling allowed citizens of around 100 nations to play cricket in any EU nation without being considered as an overseas player. The Cotonou Agreement allows the citizens of most Caribbean and African nations to be eligible for signing Kolpak agreements. However, the British Home Office stipulates that a player must have a valid work permit for four years or must have a specified number of appearances in international cricket to sign a Kolpak deal. Kolpak players older than 18 years can qualify to represent England after playing for seven years for a county and gaining citizenship. The England and Wales Cricket Board (ECB) pays £1,100 less to a county for each County Championship game and £275 less for each One Day match per Kolpak player who plays instead of a domestic cricketer. This is aimed at reducing the mass arrivals of overseas players into county cricket.

Cricketers born in British overseas territories can play county cricket as locals and need not sign Kolpak agreements. For instance, Omari Banks, who has played for the West Indies, was eligible to play for Leicestershire and Somerset as a local player because he is from Anguilla (a British overseas territory).

Kolpak deals are not possible once Britain withdrew from the European Union as part of Brexit.

== List of players ==
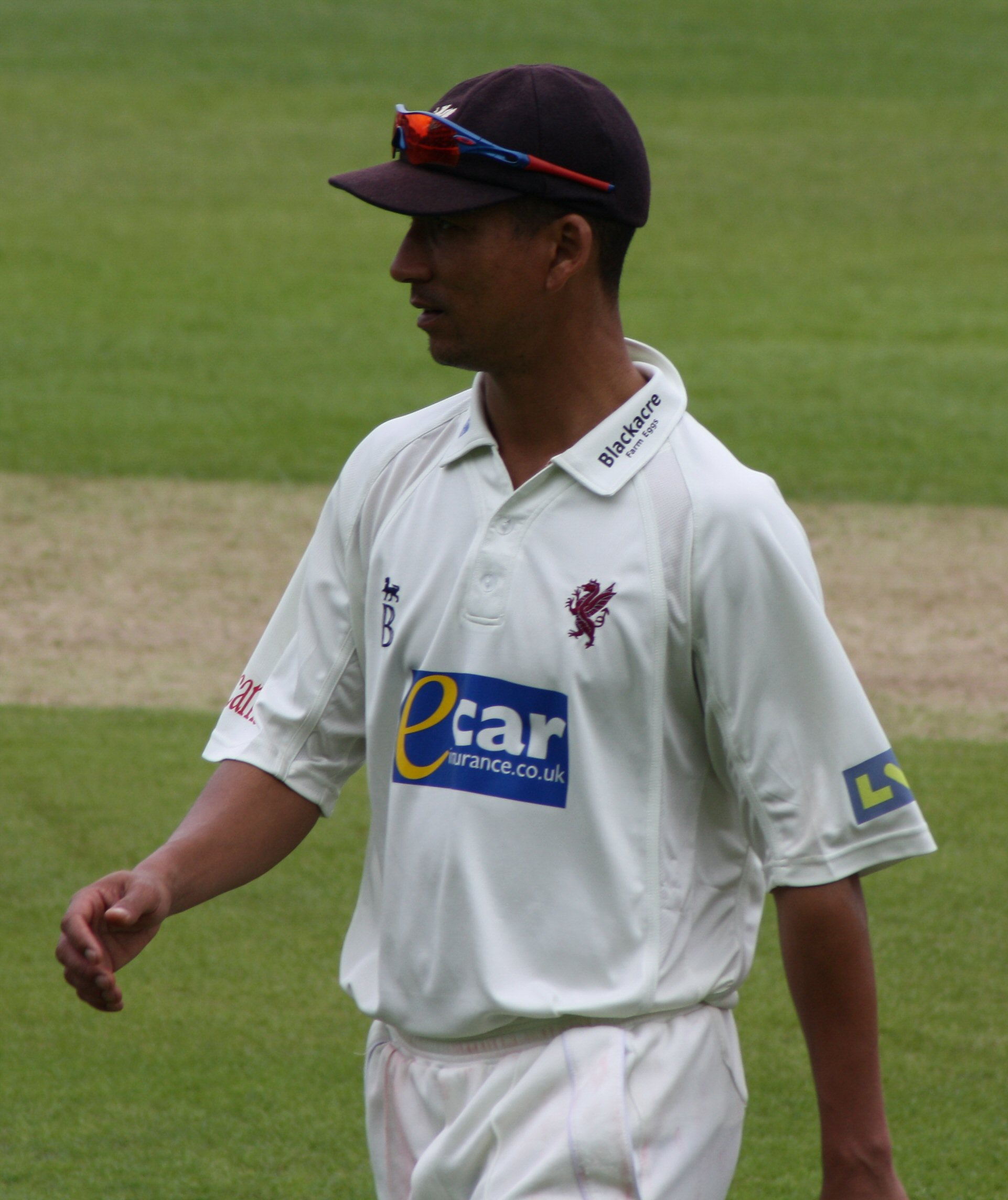
Alfonso Thomas played his only international match in 2007 before joining Somerset as a Kolpak player in 2008.

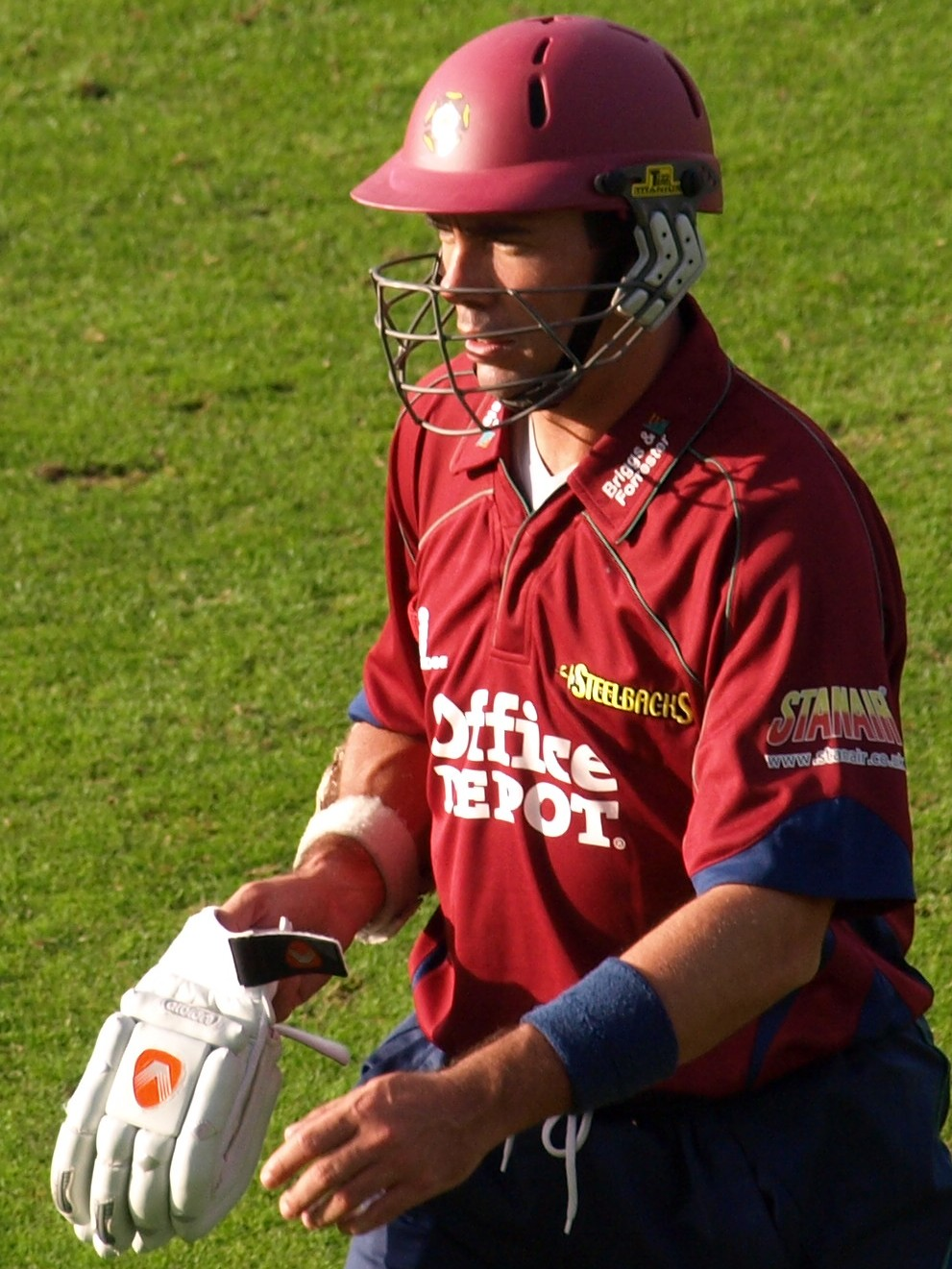
Nicky Boje retired with 100 Test wickets and later joined Northamptonshire as a Kolpak player.

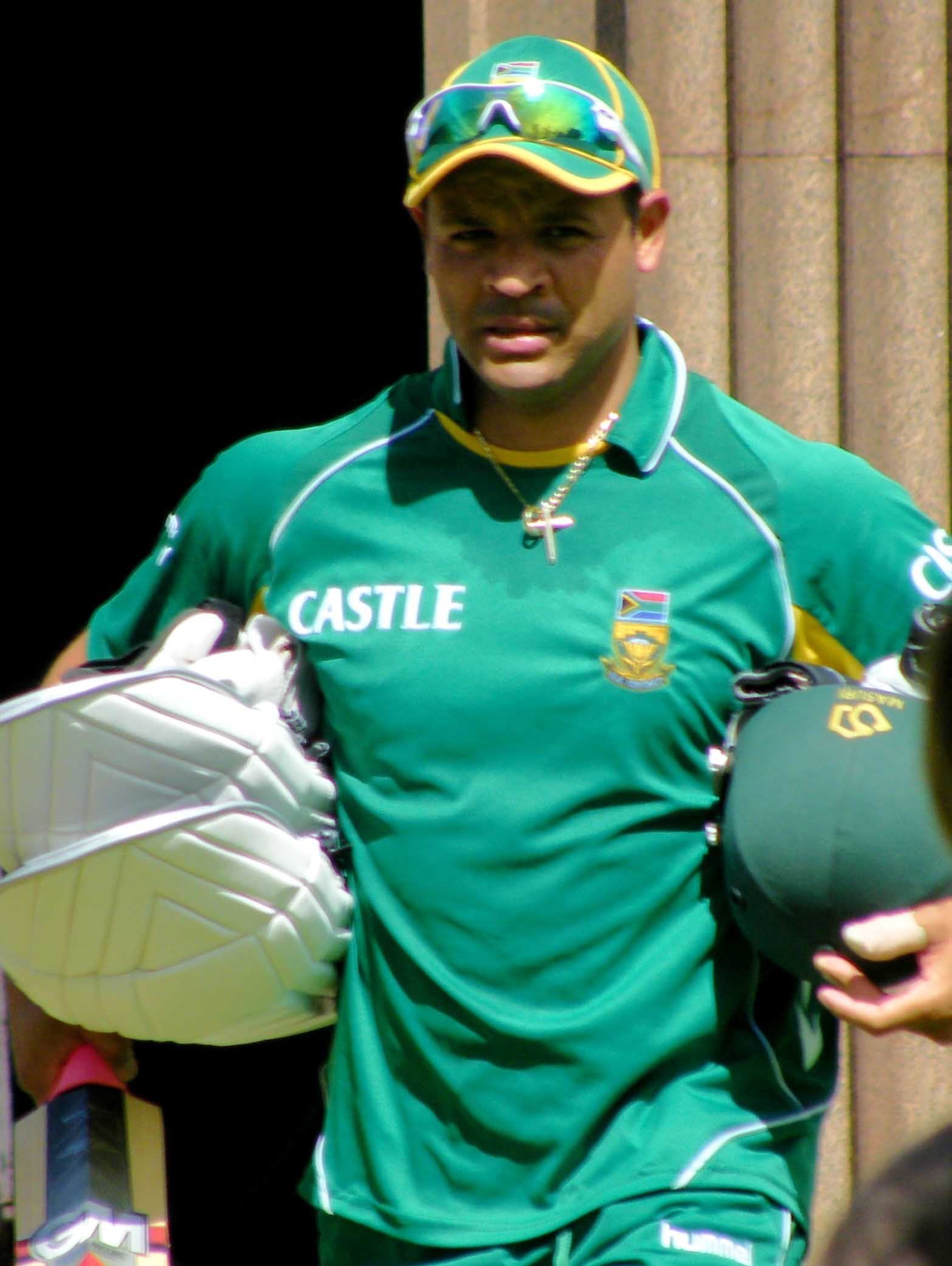
Ashwell Prince was verbally abused by Andrew Gale during a Roses Match for being a Kolpak player.

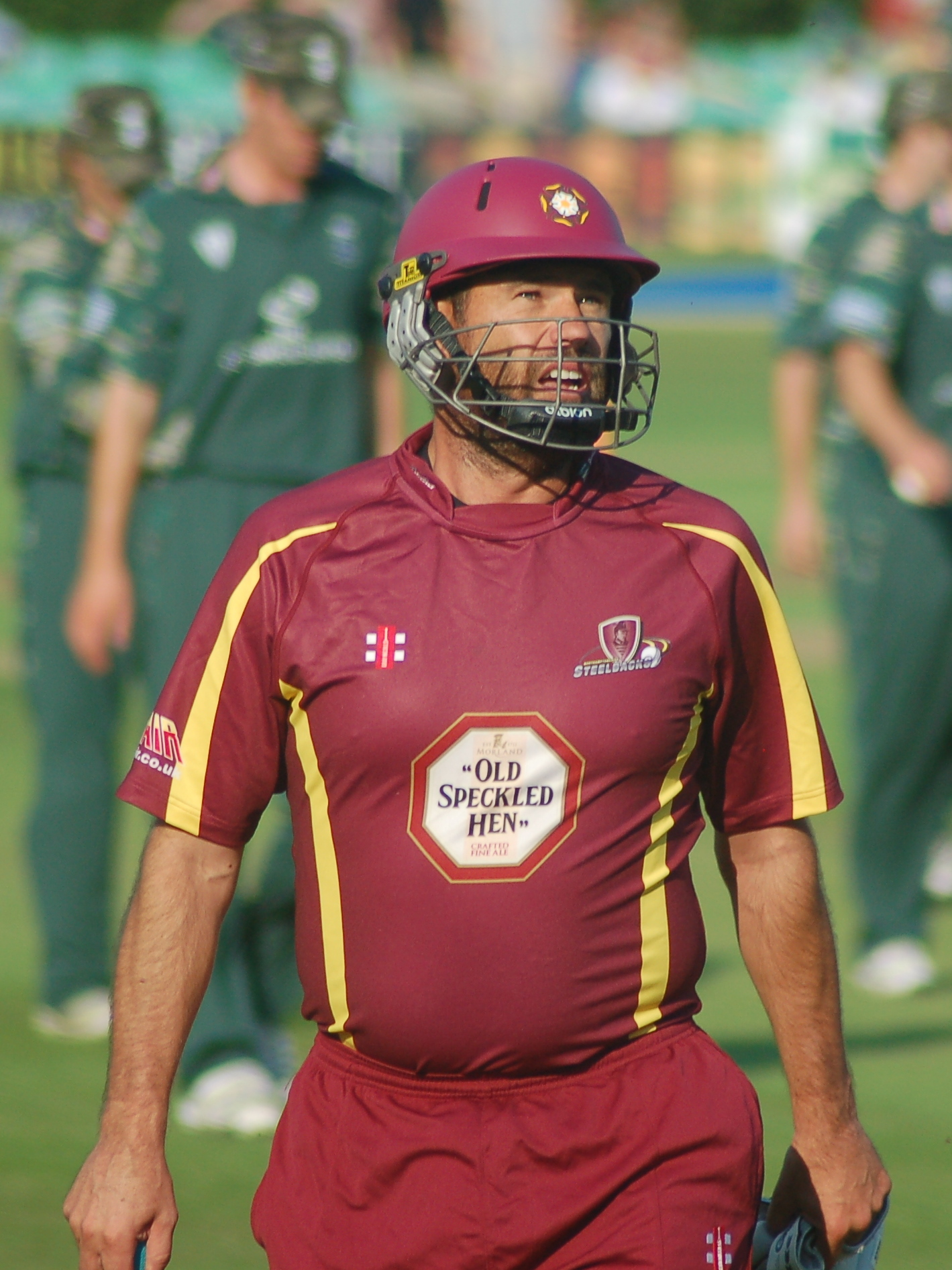
Andrew Hall joined Northamptonshire in 2008 after a stint with the Hyderabad Heroes.

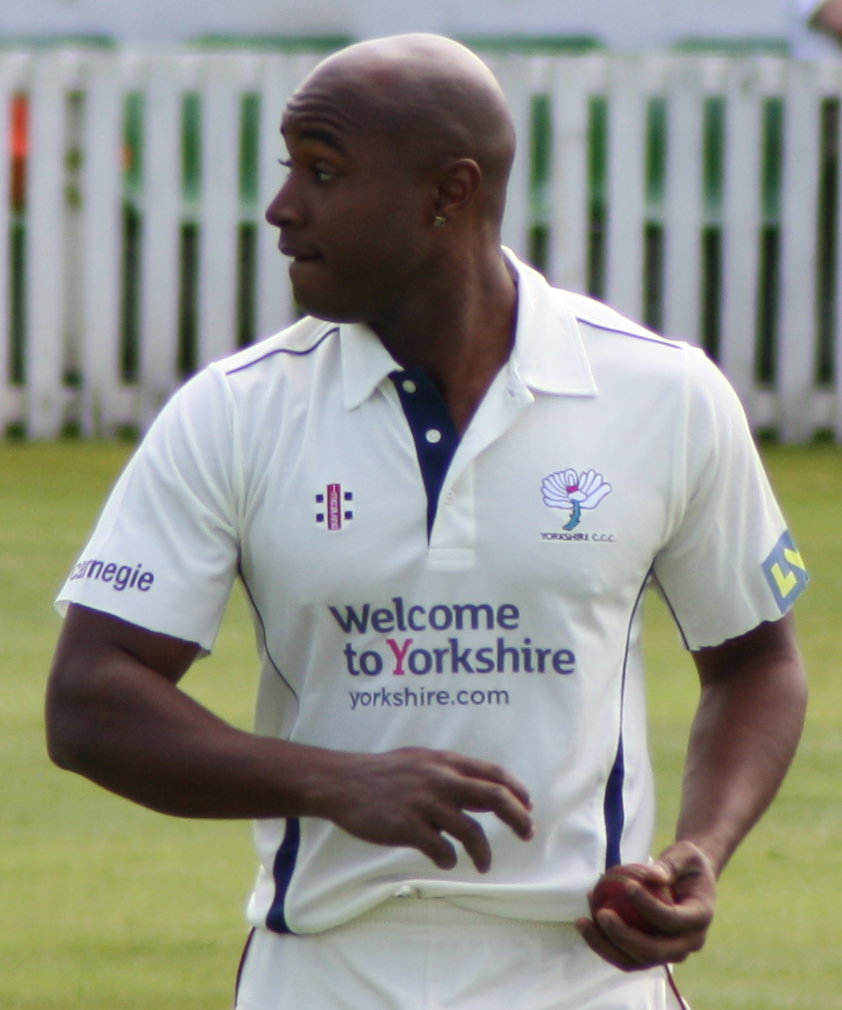
Tino Best playing for Yorkshire in 2010. He joined Hampshire as a Kolpak player in 2017.

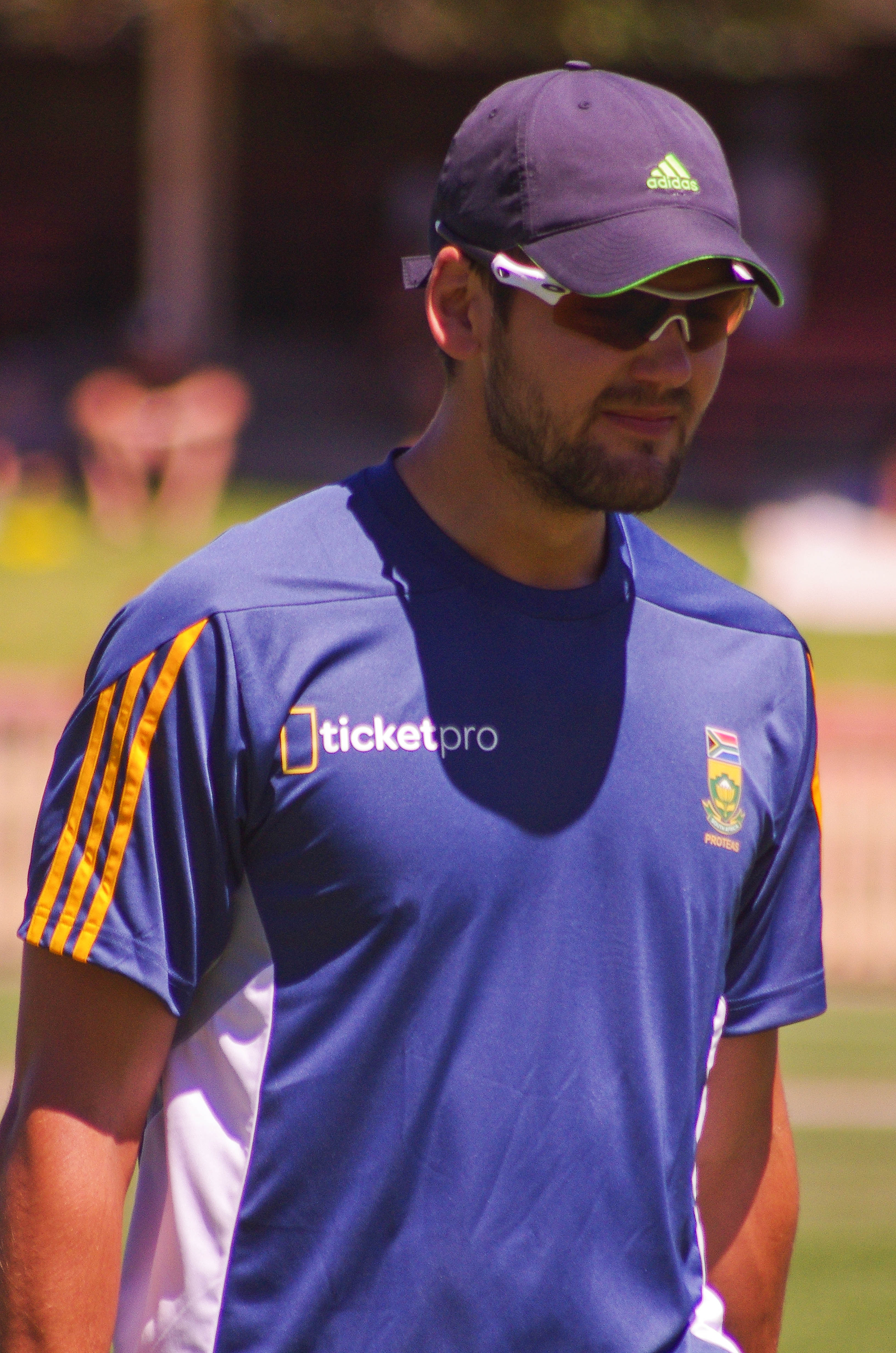
Rilee Rossouw joined Hampshire as a Kolpak player in 2017.

Year	Name	Country	County team(s)	Notes	Ref(s)
2004	Claude Henderson	South Africa	Leicestershire	Henderson was the first player to sign under the Kolpak rule	
2004	Grant Flower	Zimbabwe	Essex	His brother Andy Flower also played for Essex, but he held a British passport. Grant returned to represent Zimbabwe in 2010.	
2004	Greg Smith	South Africa	Derbyshire, Essex	Smith joined Essex in 2011, again as a Kolpak player. He is South African, though he has never played international cricket.	
2004	Ottis Gibson	Barbados	Leicestershire		
2005	Riki Wessels	South Africa	Northamptonshire, Nottinghamshire, Worcestershire	Riki is the son of former cricketer Kepler Wessels. He joined Nottinghamshire in 2011 on a Tier 1 Entrepreneur Visa.	
2005	Charl Willoughby	South Africa	Leicestershire, Somerset	Willoughby joined Somerset in 2006 and qualified as a UK resident in 2011	
2005	Martin van Jaarsveld	South Africa	Kent, Glamorgan	Van Jaarsveld moved to Glamorgan in 2012	
2005	Murray Goodwin	Zimbabwe	Sussex	Goodwin had earlier represented Sussex from 2001 as an overseas player	
2005	Zander de Bruyn	South Africa	Worcestershire, Somerset, Surrey		
2006	Lance Klusener	South Africa	Northamptonshire		
2006	Paul Harris	South Africa	Warwickshire	Harris left the county when he was selected for the South African Test side in 2007	
2007	Anthony Ireland	Zimbabwe	Gloucestershire, Middlesex	Ireland moved to Middlesex in 2011, again as a Kolpak player	
2007	Faf du Plessis	South Africa	Lancashire	du Plessis returned to South Africa when the new rules were formed in 2010 and made his ODI debut in 2011.	
2007	Garnett Kruger	South Africa	Leicestershire	Kruger joined Glamorgan for the 2009 season	
2007	Jacques Rudolph	South Africa	Yorkshire	Rudolph left Yorkshire in 2011 to play for South Africa again. He later represented Surrey and Glamorgan as an overseas player.	
2007	Pedro Collins	Barbados	Surrey, Middlesex	He moved to Middlesex in 2010, again as Kolpak player	
2007	Ryan McLaren	South Africa	Kent	McLaren left Kent in 2009 to play for South Africa again. He later represented Middlesex, Hampshire and Lancashire as an overseas player.	
2007	Tyron Henderson	South Africa	Middlesex		
2008	Alfonso Thomas	South Africa	Somerset		
2008	Andre Adams	New Zealand	Nottinghamshire, Hampshire	Adams moved to Hampshire in 2014, again as a Kolpak player	
2008	Andrew Hall	South Africa	Northamptonshire		
2008	Charl Langeveldt	South Africa	Derbyshire		
2008	Corey Collymore	Barbados	Sussex, Middlesex		
2008	Dillon du Preez	South Africa	Leicestershire	du Preez is South African though he never played international cricket	
2008	Dominic Telo	South Africa	Derbyshire		
2008	Dwayne Smith	Barbados	Sussex	His Kolpak status expired in 2010 though he continued playing for Sussex as an overseas player	
2008	Friedel de Wet	South Africa	Hampshire		
2008	Jermaine Lawson	Jamaica	Leicestershire		
2008	Johan van der Wath	South Africa	Northamptonshire		
2008	Justin Kemp	South Africa	Kent		
2008	Nantie Hayward	South Africa	Hampshire, Derbyshire	Hayward joined Derbyshire for the 2009 season	
2008	Nicky Boje	South Africa	Northamptonshire		
2008	Shaun Pollock	South Africa	Durham		
2008	Wavell Hinds	Jamaica	Derbyshire		
2009	André Nel	South Africa	Surrey		
2010	Neil McKenzie	South Africa	Hampshire		
2011	Johann Myburgh	South Africa	Hampshire, Somerset	Myburgh played for Durham as an overseas player in 2012 and joined Somerset in 2013 as a Kolpak player	
2012	Gareth Roderick	South Africa	Gloucestershire		
2013	Ashwell Prince	South Africa	Lancashire	Prince had earlier represented Lancashire from 2009 as an overseas player.	
2013	Brendan Nash	Jamaica	Kent	Nash joined as an overseas player in 2012 and got Kolpak status in 2013.	
2013	Kyle Jarvis	Zimbabwe	Lancashire		
2014	Colin Ingram	South Africa	Glamorgan		
2015	Alviro Petersen	South Africa	Lancashire	Petersen was banned for 2 years by Cricket South Africa in December 2016 for attempting to cover up match fixing in the 2015–16 Ram Slam T20 Challenge.	
2015	Brendan Taylor	Zimbabwe	Nottinghamshire		
2015	Fidel Edwards	Barbados	Hampshire		
2015	Richard Levi	South Africa	Northamptonshire		
2016	Ravi Rampaul	Trinidad and Tobago	Surrey, Derbyshire	Rampaul moved to Derbyshire in 2018, again as a Kolpak player	
2016	Hardus Viljoen	South Africa	Derbyshire/Kent		
2016	Simon Harmer	South Africa	Essex		
2016	Stiaan van Zyl	South Africa	Sussex		
2017	Tino Best	Barbados	Hampshire		
2017	David Wiese	South Africa	Sussex		
2017	Daryn Smit	South Africa	Derbyshire		
2017	Grant Elliott	New Zealand	Warwickshire		
2017	Kyle Abbott	South Africa	Hampshire		
2017	Rilee Rossouw	South Africa	Hampshire		
2017	Marchant de Lange	South Africa	Glamorgan		
2017	Shivnarine Chanderpaul	Guyana	Lancashire		
2018	Heino Kuhn	South Africa	Kent		
2018	Morné Morkel	South Africa	Surrey		
2018	Blessing Muzarabani	Zimbabwe	Northamptonshire		
2018	Wayne Parnell	South Africa	Worcestershire		
2019	Duanne Olivier	South Africa	Yorkshire		
2019	Miguel Cummins	Barbados	Middlesex		
