= Jaroslav Papiernik =

Slovak handball player (1952–2002)

Personal information
- Nationality: Slovak
- Born: 14 February 1952 Hriňová, Czechoslovakia
- Died: 26 April 2002 (aged 50) Považská Bystrica, Slovakia

Sport
- Sport: Handball
National team
- Years: Team
- –: Czechoslovakia

Teams managed
- –: MŠK Považská Bystrica

Jaroslav Papiernik (14 February 1952 – 26 April 2002) was a Slovak handball player who competed for Czechoslovakia in the 1976 Summer Olympics. In 1976 he was part of the Czechoslovak team which finished seventh in the Olympic tournament. He played all five matches and scored five goals.

After his playing career, Papiernik became a handball coach. In 2002, he coached MŠK Považská Bystrica and reached the final of the Slovak First League play-offs with this club. One day before the final match, he committed suicide by hanging, aged 50. His team went on to win the final game to become the Slovak handball champion.
