= HK 47 Trnava =

Defunct Slovak handball club

- Founded: 1947; 79 years ago, as TŠS Trnava
- Dissolved: 2011; 15 years ago
- Arena: Mestská športová hala Trnava
- Capacity: 2,500
- League: Slovenská hadzanárska extraliga
- Club colours

HK 47 Trnava (formerly known as HK Lokomotíva Trnava) was a Slovak handball club based in Trnava. It was founded in 1947 under the name TŠS Trnava. The club's home ground was the Mestská športová hala Trnava with a capacity of 2,500 spectators. The men's team participated in the highest domestic competition several times, most recently in 2010, when it withdrew from the competition during its run due to economic problems. In addition to the senior team, the club also had youth, student and preparatory teams. The club's staff included well-known players such as František Šulc, Marián Hirner, Milan Brestovanský, Juraj Šimek and Peter Mesiarik. It ceased operations in 2011, when it went bankrupt.

== History ==
HK 47 Trnava was founded by a high school professor, František Gaža in 1947. Originally involved in basketball, the club later transitioned to handball. The club's greatest successes were winning the national championship in 1994 and winning the Slovak Cup in 1993, then under the name HK Lokomotíva Trnava. It also won the Czech-Slovak championship. It was a multiple participant in the highest Czech-Slovak competition, in which it won 6 medal positions in seven-a-side handball. Based on this, it also played several European cups, in which its best result was achieved in the 1983/84 season, when it advanced to the semi-finals of the IHF Cup (today's EHF Cup). The club was dissolved in 2011 due to financial problems.

=== Historic names ===
- TŠS Trnava
- Spartak Trnava Kovo
- Spartak Trnava
- TJ Slavia Trnava
- TJ Lokomotíva Trnava
- HK Lokomotíva Trnava
- HK 47 Trnava

== Honors ==
Slovak first league

- Winners (2): 1993/94, 1995/96

Slovak Cup

- Winners (1): 1993
- Runners-up (2): 1980, 2004

Czechoslovak first league

- Winners (3): 1953, 1978/79, 1984/85
- Runners-up (3): 1963/64, 1979/80, 1982/83
