= MŠK Považská Bystrica =

Slovak handball club

- Full name: Handball Club Mestské športové kluby Považská Bystrica
- Short name: MŠKPB
- Founded: 1996; 30 years ago
- Arena: Športová Hala
- Capacity: 1,400
- President: Ľuboš Cifra
- Head coach: Václav Straka
- League: Niké Handball Extraliga
- Club colours
Home	Away

MŠK Považská Bystrica is a handball club from Považská Bystrica, Slovakia, which plays in the Niké Handball Extraliga.

Location of MŠK Považská Bystrica

== Crest, colours, supporters ==
=== Kit manufacturers ===
Period	Kit manufacturer
– 2009	(Italy) Diadora
2009–2012	(Italy) Erreà
2012–2014	(Germany) Adidas
2014–2022	(Germany) Kempa
2023–2024	(Denmark) Hummel
2024 – present	(Slovakia) ATAK

=== Kits ===
HOME
2012–14	2014–17	2017–	2024-

AWAY
2012–14	2014–17	2017–	2024-

THIRD
2014–17	2025-

== Management ==
Position	Name
President	(Slovakia) Ľuboš Cifra
Sports Director	(Slovakia) Peter Valášek
Administrative	(Slovakia) Katarína Opoldíková

== Team ==
=== Current squad ===
Squad for the 2025–26 season

MŠK Považská Bystrica

Goalkeepers

- 12 (Slovakia) Ladislav Kovačin
- 16 (Slovakia) Ľubomír Chabada
- 96 (Slovakia) Lukáš Gálik
- (Slovakia) Adam Ochaba

Left Wingers

- 3 (Slovakia) Lukáš Péchy
- 27 (Slovakia) Dávid Urík

Right Wingers

- 14 (Slovakia) Adam Petrík
- 22 (Slovakia) Adam Ďurana
- 27 (Slovakia) Bruno Riljak

Line Players

- 7 (Slovakia) Šimon Macháč
- 17 (Slovakia) Patrik Tichý

Central Backs

- 8 (Slovakia) Andrej Sloboda
- 10 (Slovakia) Filip Skáčik
- 11 (Slovakia) Ján Krok
- 19 (Slovakia) Samuel Kovács
- 21 (Slovakia) Ľubomír Ďuriš

Left Backs

- 24 (Slovakia) Marek Štefina
- 28 (Slovakia) Marek Hlinka

Right Backs

- 18 (Slovakia) Peter Jurák
- (Slovakia) Adrián Fekeč

=== Technical staff ===
- Head coach: (Czech Republic) Václav Straka
- Assistant coach: (Slovakia) Peter Valášek
- Fitness coach: (Slovakia) Miroslav Smataník
- Physiotherapist: (Slovakia) Peter Haladej
- Club doctor: (Slovakia) Dr. Vladimír Fábry

=== Transfers ===
Transfers for the 2026–27 season

Joining

- (Cuba) Pavel Caballero (LB) from (Slovakia) HT Tatran Prešov

Leaving

=== Transfer History ===
Transfers for the 2025–26 season

Joining

- (Slovakia) Lukáš Péchy (LW) from (Slovakia) HC Sporta Hlohovec
- (Slovakia) Ján Krok (CB) from (Slovakia) HT Tatran Prešov
- (Slovakia) Samuel Kovács (CB) (from (Slovakia) HC Záhoráci)
- (Montenegro) Đorđe Šljukić (RB) (from (Greece) A.S. Amyntas Amyntaiou)
- (Croatia) Erik Vukotić (LP) (from (Croatia) RK Umag)

Leaving

- (Slovakia) Marián Žernovič (GK) to (Hungary) Budai Farkasok KKUK
- (Slovakia) Ivan Bystrický (LP) (to (Czech Republic) KH Kopřivnice)
- (Slovakia) Marek Roman (LB) (to (Czech Republic) KH Kopřivnice)
- (Slovakia) Peter Dudáš (LP) (to (Slovakia) HC SPORTA Hlohovec)
- (Serbia) Nemanja Živković (RW) (to ?)
- (Slovakia) Martin Briatka (LW) (retires)
- (Slovakia) Tomáš Vallo (CB) (retires)
- (Slovakia) Marián Gardian (CB) (retires)
- (Slovakia) Branislav Kvaššay (RB) (retires)

== Accomplishments ==
- National Championship of Slovakia: (4)
  - 2002, 2003, 2006, 2023
- National Cup of Slovakia: (5)
  - 2001, 2006, 2019, 2022, 2025
- EHF Champions League
  - Group Stage (2): 2003/04, 2006/07
- EHF European League
  - Group Stage (1): 2023/24

== Former club members ==
=== Notable former players ===
- (Czech Republic) Rostislav Baďura (2001–2006)
- (Czech Republic) Lukáš Buchta (2002–2005)
- (Czech Republic) Radim Chudoba (2015–2018)
- (Czech Republic) Jaroslav Dyba (2014–2016)
- (Czech Republic) Miroslav Ďurajka (2003)
- (Czech Republic) Tomáš Hes (2015–2016)
- (Czech Republic) Josef Hozman (2021–2023)
- (Czech Republic) Miloslav Krahulík (2005–2007)
- (Czech Republic) Radek Motlík (2016–2018)
- (Czech Republic) Václav Straka (2005–2007, 2008–2009)
- (Czech Republic) Martin Toms (2005–2006)
- (Czech Republic) Marek Tůma (2004–2007, 2008–2009)
- (Czech Republic) Ondřej Zdráhala (2012–2013)
- (Russia) Maxim Shalimov (2003)
- (Serbia) Nemanja Živković (2023–2025)
- (Slovakia) Tomáš Adamčík (2007–2015)
- (Slovakia) Martin Briatka (2018–2025)
- (Slovakia) Ivan Bystrický (2015–2025)
- (Slovakia) Ľubomír Drápal (2001–2010, 2014–2016)
- (Slovakia) Andrej Firit (2006–2016)
- (Slovakia) Jozef Hanták ml. (2006–2008)
- (Slovakia) Július Korňan (1996–2005, 2009–2013)
- (Slovakia) Jozef Kozák ml. (2006–2016)
- (Slovakia) Martin Kozák (2006–2019)
- (Slovakia) Róbert Kravčák (2000–2001)
- (Slovakia) Peter Kukučka (1992–2003)
- (Slovakia) Martin Maťaš (2005–2006, 2008–2009)
- (Slovakia) Samuel Mažár (2003–2007)
- (Slovakia) Peter Opoldík (−2008)
- (Slovakia) Radovan Pekár (2000–2001)
- (Slovakia) Pavol Polakovič (2001–2004)
- (Slovakia) Stanislav Pupík (2016–2019)
- (Slovakia) Martin Spuchlák (2003–2004)
- (Slovakia) Tomáš Straňovský (2004–2005)
- (Slovakia) Marián Tallo (2002–2003)
- (Slovakia) John Trabelssie (−1999, 2001–2007)
- (Slovakia) Peter Tumidalský (2016–2019)
- (Slovakia) Peter Valášek (−2002, 2005)
- (Slovakia) Tomáš Vallo (2007–2025)
- (Slovakia) Peter Zaťko (2003–2007)
- (Slovakia) Marián Žernovič (2009–2011, 2024–2025)
- (Ukraine) Serhii Petrychenko (2019–2021, 2023–2024)
- (Ukraine) (Slovakia) Liubomyr Ivanytsia (2018–2021)
- (Bosnia and Herzegovina) (Slovakia) Anur Burnazović (2019–2021)

=== Former coaches ===
Seasons	Coach	Country
	Dušan Porubský	(Slovakia)
-2000	Miroslav Miňo	(Slovakia)
2000–2002	Jaroslav Papiernik	(Slovakia)
2002	Rudolf Havlík	(Czech Republic)
2003	Jiří Kekrt	(Czech Republic)
2003–2004	Ivan Hargaš	(Slovakia)
2004	Jozef Hanták	(Slovakia)
2004–2005	František Šulc	(Czech Republic)
2005–2006	Martin Lipták	(Slovakia)
2007	František Šulc	(Czech Republic)
2007–2008	Jozef Hanták	(Slovakia)
2008	Juraj Jurajov	(Slovakia)
2008	František Šulc	(Czech Republic)
2009	Ivan Pompoš	(Slovakia)
2009–2010	Jozef Kozák	(Slovakia)
2010–2011	Július Korňan	(Slovakia)
2011–2012	Jozef Kozák	(Slovakia)
2012–2013	Jiří Kekrt	(Czech Republic)
2013–	Václav Straka	(Czech Republic)
