= Alexander Radčenko =

Czech handball player

Personal information
- Born: 5 July 1973 (age 52); Krasnodar, Russian SFSR, Soviet Union
- Height: 1.87 m (6 ft 1 1/2 in)
- Playing position: Center Back

Senior clubs
- Years: Team
- 1996–1998: (Russia) SKIF Krasnodar
- 1998–1999: (Russia) Istochnik Rostov-on-Don
- 1999–2003: (Czech Republic) HC Banik Karviná
- 2003–2005: (Italy) Pallamano Conversano
- 2005–2006: (Germany) MT Melsungen
- 2006–2007: (Italy) Italgest Casarano
- 2007–2016: (Slovakia) HT Tatran Prešov

Alexander Radčenko (born 5 July 1973) is a Czech former handball player, who played for the Czech national handball team. He played in the Czech league for Baník OKD Karviná until he left in 2003 following the club's economic difficulties. He also played in SKIF Krasnodar, Istochnik Rostov-on-Don, Pallamano Conversano, MT Melsungen and Italgest Casara.
