= Inal Aflitulin =

Russian handball player

Personal information
- Nationality: Russian
- Born: 22 March 1988 (age 38) Astrakhan, Soviet Union
- Height: 1.83 m (6 ft 0 in)

Sport
- Sport: Handball
- Position: Central back
- Current club: Spartak Moscow
- Number: 31

Youth career
- Years: Team
- 1995-2008: (Russia) Dynamo Astrakhan

Senior clubs
- Years: Team
- 2008–2011: (Russia) Chekhovskiye Medvedi
- 2011–2015: (Ukraine) HC Motor Zaporizhzhia
- 2015: (Romania) Minaur Baia Mare
- 2015–2016: (Germany) Bergischer HC
- 2016–2017: (Hungary) Telekom Veszprém
- 2017–2018: (Hungary) Eger-Eszterházy
- 2018–2020: (Russia) Spartak Moscow
- 2020: (Russia) Victor Stavropol
National team
Years	Team	Apps	(Gls)
2014	Russia	3	(5)

Inal Sharipovich Aflitulin (born 22 March 1988 in Astrakhan, Soviet Union), is a Russian handball player who plays for Victor Stavropol and the Russian national team.
