= Igor Radojević =

Montenegrin handball player (born 1990)

Personal information
- Nationality: Montenegrin
- Born: 25 June 1990 (age 36) Berane, Montenegro
- Height: 1.91 m (6 ft 3 in)

Sport
- Sport: Handball
- Position: Right wing
- Current club: Eger-Eszterházy SzSE
- Number: 22
National team
Years	Team	Apps	(Gls)
–	Montenegro	7	(1)

Igor Radojević (born 25 June 1990) is a Montenegrin handball player for Eger-Eszterházy SzSE and the Montenegro national team.

He participated at the 2018 European Men's Handball Championship.
