= Richard Štochl =

Slovak handball player (born 1975)

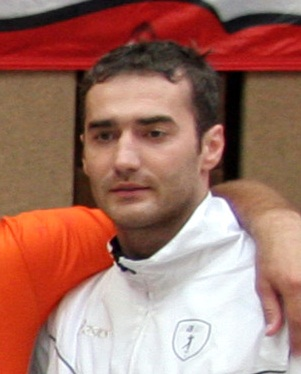

Personal information
- Born: 17 December 1975 (age 50) Michalovce, Czechoslovakia
- Height: 2.00 m (6 ft 6 1/2 in)

Sport
- Sport: Handball
- Position: Goalkeeper
- Current club: Retired

Youth career
- Years: Team
- –: Zempmilk Michalovce

Senior clubs
- Years: Team
- 1994-1998: HT Tatran Prešov
- 1998-1999: VSŽ Košice
- 1999-2001: ŠKP Sečovce
- 2001: → HC Dukla Prague (on loan)
- 2001-2009: Dunaferr SE
- 2009 - 2010: RK Celje
- 2010-2012: Montpellier HB
- 2012-2013: Chekhovskiye Medvedi
- 2013-2015: Motor Zaporizhzhia
- 2015: Rhein-Neckar Löwen
- 2015-2018: HK Agro Topoľčany
National team
Years	Team	Apps	(Gls)
1996-	Slovakia	265	(9)

Richard Štochl (born 17 December 1975) is a Slovak former handball goalkeeper who played for the Slovakia national team.
