= Václav Straka =

Czech handball player (born 1978)

Personal information
- Born: May 24, 1978 (age 48) Tábor, Czechoslovakia
- Height: 1.90 m (6 ft 3 in)

Sport
- Sport: Handball
- Current club: TJ Štart Nové Zámky
- Number: 10

Senior clubs
- Years: Team
- –: (Czech Republic) HC Frýdek-Místek (....-2005)
- 2005-2007: (Slovakia) MŠK Považská Bystrica
- 2007-2008: (Czech Republic) HC Dukla Prague
- 2008-2009: (Slovakia) MŠK Považská Bystrica
- 2009-2010: (Czech Republic) HC Frýdek-Místek
- 2010-present: (Slovakia) TJ Štart Nové Zámky

Václav Straka (born May 24, 1978) is a Czech handball player, currently playing for MŠK Považská Bystrica in the Slovak Extraliga. He also played for HC Frýdek-Místek, MŠK Považská Bystrica and HC Dukla Prague.
