= HK Košice =

Slovakian handball club

- Full name: Hádzanársky klub Košice
- Short name: HK
- Founded: 1967; 59 years ago
- Arena: Handball aréna Bernolákova, Košice
- Capacity: 500
- President: Ondrej Melich
- Head coach: Martin Lipták
- League: Niké Handball Extraliga
- Club colours
Home	Away

HK Košice is a handball club from Košice, Slovakia, that plays in the Niké Handball Extraliga.

Location of HK Košice

== History ==
The handball club was founded in 1967 under the name TJ VSŽ Košice. After the 1971/72 season, when they won the Czechoslovak 2nd League, the handball players from Košice were promoted to the Czechoslovak I.Liga, in which they played without a break until the classification of Czechoslovakia in 1993. In the 1977/1978 season, the club won its first Czechoslovakia league title. After that, he won the Czechoslovakia championship twice more: in the 1980/81 and 1988/1989 seasons. In 1980, they won the Czechoslovakia Cup. After the independence of Slovakia, they won the National Championship of Slovakia twice: in 1997 and 1999. They won the National Cup of Slovakia 9 times: in 1979, 1980, 1983, 1992, 1995, 1996, 1998, 1999 and 2003.

=== Naming history ===
Name	Period
TJ VSŽ Košice	1967−1998
HK TJ VSŽ Košice	1998–1999
HK VSŽ Košice	1999–2006
1.MHK Košice	2006–2015
HŠK ŠG Košice	2015–2020
HK Košice	2020–present

== Sports Hall information ==
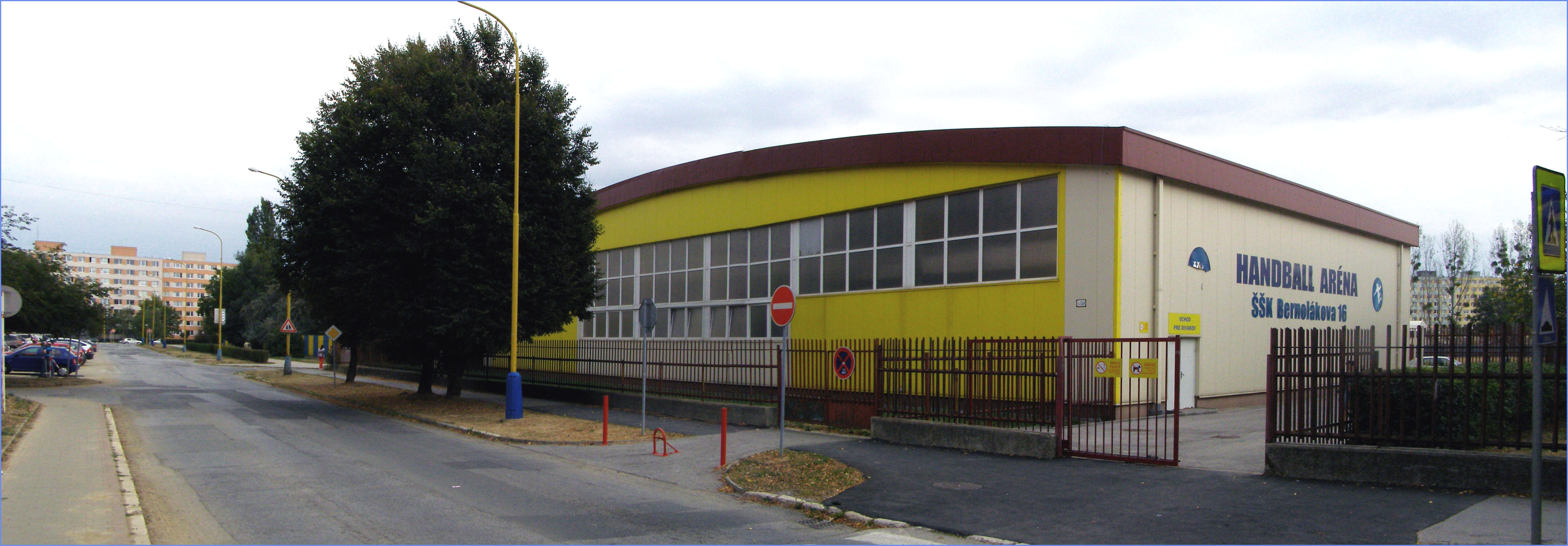
Home hall: Handball aréna Bernolákova

- Name: – Handball aréna Bernolákova
- City: – Košice
- Capacity: – 500
- Address: – Handball aréna, ZŠ Bernolákova 16, Košice, Slovakia

== Management ==
Position	Name
President	(Slovakia) Ondrej Melich
Vice President	(Slovakia) Dušan Timko

== Team ==
=== Current squad ===
Squad for the 2022–23 season

HK Košice

Goalkeepers

- 16 (Slovakia) Maroš Popčák
- 23 (Slovakia) Michal Shejbal
- 66 (Slovakia) Milan Kľučár

Left Wingers

- 24 (Slovakia) Jakub Chudík
- 29 (Slovakia) Dominik Bakši
- 42 (Slovakia) Martin Straňovský

Right Wingers

- 4 (Slovakia) Adam Takáč
- 28 (Slovakia) Filip Jászai

Line Players

- 27 (Slovakia) Erik Ľoch
- 33 (Slovakia) Marián Maguška
- 69 (Slovakia) Michal Capík

Central Backs

- 90 (Slovakia) Vladimír Guzy

Left Backs

- 8 (Slovakia) Matúš Hriňák
- 11 (Slovakia) Ondrej Melich
- 19 (Slovakia) Peter Tumidalský

Right Backs

- 3 (Slovakia) Patrik Hruščák
- 7 (Slovakia) Jakub Dani
- 15 (Slovakia) Maroš Baláž

=== Technical staff ===
- Head coach: (Czech Republic) Martin Lipták
- Goalkeeping coach: (Slovakia) Richard Štochl
- Fitness coach: (Slovakia) Jaroslav Dulina
- Club doctor: (Slovakia) Dr. Peter Polan

=== Transfers ===
Transfers for the 2026–27 season

Joining

Leaving

=== Transfer History ===
Transfers for the 2025–26 season

Joining

- (Slovakia) Maroš Varga (LP) from (Slovakia) HT Tatran Prešov

Leaving

Transfers for the 2022–23 season

Joining

- (Slovakia) Patrik Hruščák (RB) back from loan at (Switzerland) HSC Suhr Aarau

Leaving

- (Slovakia) Patrik Hruščák (RB) on loan at (Switzerland) HSC Suhr Aarau

== Accomplishments ==
- National Championship of Slovakia: 2
  - 1997, 1999
- National Cup of Slovakia: 9
  - 1979, 1980, 1983, 1992, 1995, 1996, 1998, 1999, 2003
- Czechoslovakia Handball League: 3
  - 1978, 1981, 1989
- National Cup of Czechoslovakia: 1
  - 1980

== Former club members ==
=== Notable former players ===
- (Slovakia) Radoslav Antl (1995–2001, 2009–2016)
- (Slovakia) Vlastimil Fuňák (2000–2004, 2009–2016)
- (Slovakia) Patrik Hruščák (2006–2008, 2011–2013, 2021–)
- (Slovakia) Maroš Kolpak (1995–1997)
- (Slovakia) Michal Kopčo (2004–2005)
- (Slovakia) Radoslav Kozlov (2000–2002)
- (Slovakia) Matej Mikita (2012–2016)
- (Slovakia) Teodor Paul (2004–2008)
- (Slovakia) Michal Shejbal (2002–2004, 2010–2011, 2021–)
- (Slovakia) Richard Štochl (1998–1999)
- (Slovakia) Martin Straňovský (2021–)
- (Slovakia) Tomáš Urban (2006–2010)
