= Slovakia men's national handball team =

Men's national handball team

Slovakia

Information
- Association: Slovak Handball Federation
- Coach: Fernando Gurich Mina
- Most caps: Richard Štochl (229)
- Most goals: Radoslav Antl (721)

Colours
| 1st | 2nd |

Results

World Championship
- Appearances: 2 (First in 2009)
- Best result: 10th (2009)

European Championship
- Appearances: 4 (First in 2006)
- Best result: 16th (2006, 2008, 2012)
- Last updated on Unknown.

The Slovakia national handball team is the national handball team of Slovakia. It takes part in international team handball competitions. It was established in 1993 by the disintegration of the Czechoslovak team, of which it is the successor.

== Competitive record ==
=== World Championship ===
World Championship record
| Year | Round | Position | GP | W | D | L | GS | GA |
|---|---|---|---|---|---|---|---|---|
| (Sweden) 1993 | Participated as Unified team of Czech Republic and Slovakia | | | | | | | |
| (Iceland) 1995 | did not qualify | | | | | | | |
| (Japan) 1997 | did not qualify | | | | | | | |
| (Egypt) 1999 | did not qualify | | | | | | | |
| (France) 2001 | did not qualify | | | | | | | |
| (Portugal) 2003 | did not qualify | | | | | | | |
| (Tunisia) 2005 | did not qualify | | | | | | | |
| (Germany) 2007 | did not qualify | | | | | | | |
| (Croatia) 2009 | 9th/24th place | 10 | 9 | 4 | 1 | 4 | 253 | 231 |
| (Sweden) 2011 | 17th/24th place | 17 | 7 | 2 | 1 | 4 | 205 | 224 |
| (Spain) 2013 | did not qualify | | | | | | | |
| (Qatar) 2015 | did not qualify | | | | | | | |
| (France) 2017 | did not qualify | | | | | | | |
| (Denmark) (Germany) 2019 | did not qualify | | | | | | | |
| (Egypt) 2021 | did not qualify | | | | | | | |
| (Poland) / (Sweden) 2023 | did not qualify | | | | | | | |
| (Croatia) / (Denmark) / (Norway) 2025 | did not qualify | | | | | | | |
| (Germany) 2027 | did not qualify | | | | | | | |
| (France) / (Germany) 2029 | TBD | | | | | | | |
| (Denmark) / (Iceland) / (Norway) 2031 | TBD | | | | | | | |
| Total | 2/20 | – | 16 | 6 | 2 | 8 | 458 | 455 |

=== European Championship ===
European Championship record
| Year | Round | Position | GP | W | D | L | GS | GA |
|---|---|---|---|---|---|---|---|---|
| (Portugal) 1994 | did not qualify | | | | | | | |
| (Spain) 1996 | did not qualify | | | | | | | |
| (Italy) 1998 | did not qualify | | | | | | | |
| (Croatia) 2000 | did not qualify | | | | | | | |
| (Sweden) 2002 | did not qualify | | | | | | | |
| (Slovenia) 2004 | did not qualify | | | | | | | |
| (Switzerland) 2006 | Preliminary round | 16 | 3 | 0 | 0 | 3 | 72 | 100 |
| (Norway) 2008 | Preliminary round | 16 | 3 | 0 | 0 | 3 | 78 | 101 |
| (Austria) 2010 | did not qualify | | | | | | | |
| (Serbia) 2012 | Preliminary round | 16 | 3 | 0 | 1 | 2 | 70 | 92 |
| (Denmark) 2014 | did not qualify | | | | | | | |
| (Poland) 2016 | did not qualify | | | | | | | |
| (Croatia) 2018 | did not qualify | | | | | | | |
| (Austria) (Norway) (Sweden) 2020 | did not qualify | | | | | | | |
| (Hungary) (Slovakia) 2022 | Preliminary round | 18 | 3 | 1 | 0 | 2 | 83 | 97 |
| (Germany) 2024 | did not qualify | | | | | | | |
| (Denmark) (Norway) (Sweden) 2026 | did not qualify | | | | | | | |
| (Portugal) (Spain) (Switzerland) 2028 | TBD | | | | | | | |
| (Czech Republic) (Denmark) (Poland) 2030 | TBD | | | | | | | |
| (France) (Germany) 2032 | TBD | | | | | | | |
| Total | 4/20 | – | 12 | 1 | 1 | 10 | 303 | 390 |

== Team ==
=== Current squad ===
| No. | Name | Club |
Goalie
| 1 | Teodor Paul | USAM Nîmes Gard |
| 67 | Marián Žernovič | Ferencvárosi TC |
| 96 | Michal Martin Konečný | HKM Sala |
Pivots
| 49 | Martin Slaninka | HSC Suhr Aarau |
| 77 | Šimon Macháč | Talent Plzeň |
| 48 | Dominik Kalafut | HSG Nordhorn-Lingen |
| 4 | Boris Rešovký | FyllingenBergen |
Wings
| 24 | Martin Straňovský | Ademar Leon |
| 22 | Juraj Briatka | HTV Hemer |
| 35 | Martin Briatka | MŠK Považská Bystrica |
| 20 | Tomáš Urban | Košice Crows |
| - | Dávid Mišových | Slovan Modra |
| - | Tomáš Bogár | HKM Sala |
Clutches
| 21 | Ľubomír Ďuriš | B.Braun Gyöngyös |
| 17 | Lukáš Urban | HT Tatran Prešov |
| 8 | Martin Potisk | ThSV Eisenach |
| 36 | Marek Hlinka | HC Zubří |
| 34 | Vladimír Guzy | Košice Crows |
| 13 | Patrik Hruščák | Košice Crows |
| 25 | Marek Kováčech | Union Leoben |
| 2 | Oliver Rábek | HT Tatran Prešov |
Coach
Peter Kukučka

=== Player statistics ===
Most Capped Players
| Player | Games | Position |
|---|---|---|
| Richard Štochl | 229 | GK |
| Daniel Valo | 135 | OB |
| Radoslav Antl | 134 | W |
| Martin Straňovský | 100+ | W |
| Peter Kukučka | 100+ | CB |

Top Scorers
| Player | Goals | Position |
|---|---|---|
| Radoslav Antl | 538 | W |
| Daniel Valo | 520 | OB |
| Martin Straňovský | 343 | W |
| Peter Kukučka | 324 | CB |
| František Šulc | 249 | OB |

== See also ==
- Slovakia women's national handball team
