= Vasko Dimitrovski =

Macedonian handball player

Personal information
- Nationality: Macedonian
- Born: 9 October 1982 (age 44) Bitola, Macedonia
- Height: 1.93 m (6 ft 4 in)

Sport
- Sport: Handball
- Position: Pivot

Youth career
- Years: Team
- 1995–2003: RK Pelister Bitola

Senior clubs
- Years: Team
- 2003–2012: RK Pelister
- 2012–2013: RK Vardar PRO
- 2013–2014: RK Pelister
- 2015: RK Prilep
- 2015: Eger SBS
- 2015–2022: RK Eurofarm Pelister 2
National team
Years	Team	Apps	(Gls)
–	Macedonia	2	(0)

Vasko DimitrovskI (born 9 October 1982) is a retired Macedonian handball player.
