= Ádám Bajorhegyi =

Hungarian handball player (born 1980)

Personal information
- Full name: Ádám Bajorhegyi
- Nationality: Hungarian
- Born: 17 November 1980 (age 45) Szeged, Hungary
- Height: 1.96 m (6 ft 5 in)

Sport
- Sport: Handball
- Position: Left Back
- Current club: Makói KC

Senior clubs
- Years: Team
- –2001: HC Szarvas
- 2001–2003: Makó KC
- 2003–2007: Gyöngyösi FKK
- 2007–2010: Mezőkövesdi KC
- 2010–2012: SC Pick Szeged
- 2012–2014: Váci KSE
- 2014: Sport36-Komló
- 2014–2015: HC Elbflorenz Dresden
- 2015–2019: Eger-Eszterházy SzSE
- 2019–2021: FKSE Algyő
- 2021–: Makói KC

Ádám Bajorhegyi (born 17 November 1980 in Szeged) is a Hungarian handballer who plays for Eger-Eszterházy SzSE.

== Achievements ==
- Nemzeti Bajnokság I:
  - Silver Medalist: 2011
- Nemzeti Bajnokság I/B:
  - Winner: 2006
- Magyar Kupa:
  - Finalist: 2012
