= Radoslav Antl =

Slovak handball player (born 1978)

Personal information
- Born: 3 February 1978 (age 48) Košice, Czechoslovakia
- Height: 1.80 m (5 ft 11 in)

Sport
- Sport: Handball
- Position: Left wing
- Current club: HT Tatran Prešov

Senior clubs
- Years: Team
- -2004: 1.MHK Košice
- 2004–2005: HT Tatran Prešov
- 2005–2008: Grasshopper Zürich
- 2008–2009: ZMC Amicitia Zürich
- 2009–2016: HT Tatran Prešov
- 2016–2018: Eger-Eszterházy SzSE
National team
Years	Team	Apps	(Gls)
–	Slovakia	137	(545)

Teams managed
- 2021–2022: HT Tatran Prešov

Radoslav Antl (born 2 March 1978) is a retired Slovak handball player and former coach of HT Tatran Prešov in the Slovak Extraliga. He also played for the Slovak national handball team.
