= HK agro Topoľčany =

Slovak handball club

- Founded: 1951
- Arena: Mestská športová hala Topoľčany
- Capacity: 2,050 seats
- League: Slovenská hadzanárska extraliga
- Club colours

HK agro Topoľčany is a handball club from Topoľčany, Slovakia, that plays in the Niké Handball Extraliga. The club plays its home games in the Mestská športová hala Topoľčany, which has a capacity of 2,050 seats.

Topoľčany are a three-time champion of Slovakia in the seasons 1994/95, 1995/96 and 1997/98. The club has also won one Slovak Cup. It was founded in 1951. They have also appeared in European competitions several times. In the 2014/15 season, Topoľčany would advance to the 3rd round of the EHF European League after beating Dutch side Bevo HC.

== History ==
=== 1994–1998: Most successful seasons ===
In the 1994/95 season, Topoľčany started their title winning season with two losses, against Prešov and Košice. Since the fifth round, the Topoľčany have been on a streak of eleven consecutive wins. They would also beat the previous champion, Trnava, by nineteen goals. The club took the lead in the table after the regular season. Topoľčany would officially win their first title after beating SKP Bratislava. That season, the club would also win the Slovak Handball Cup.

In the following season, Topoľčany won the First League again. In the 26th round of the Men's League, the leading Topoľčany defeated the second-placed Košice and, after a six-goal victory, which separated them from Košice in the table by 7 points before the last two rounds, they secured the league championship for the second season in a row.

=== 2018–present: Recent years ===
In the 2017/2018 season, Topoľčany finished runners up in the league, losing to HT Tatran Prešov in the deciding match.

In August 2019, the club changed its name from the original HK agro Topoľčany to the Municipal Handball Club Topoľčany, due to the fact that the original sponsor Agrostav was no longer a handball sponsor and the city of Topoľčany had taken over the leading sponsor position. At the end of August 2019, club president Martin Miženko confirmed that the club would continue as HK agro Topoľčany in the 2019/2020 season, due to the financial demands on the club.

== Ground ==
The Mestská športová hala Topoľčany [sk] is a sports hall in Topoľčany. Handball is mainly played in the hall and the home ground to Agro Topoľčany and ŠKP Topoľčany. The ground underwent a complete reconstruction in 2020. The hall has a seating capacity of 2,050.

== Club names ==
- Lokomotíva Topoľčany
- HO Poľnohospodár Topoľčany VTJ
- Agro VTJ Topoľčany
- Agro VÚB Topoľčany
- HC Topoľčany
- HC THP Topvar Topoľčany
- TOP Hand Club
- HK agro Topoľčany
- Municipal Handball Club Topoľčany
- HK agro Topoľčany

== Team ==
=== Current squad ===
Squad for the 2025–26 season

Goalkeepers
Left Wingers
Right Wingers
Line players

Left Backs
Central Backs
Right Backs

=== Transfers ===
Transfers for the 2025–26 season

Joining

Leaving

- (Slovakia) Jakub Valent (LB) to (Slovakia) HT Tatran Prešov

== Honors ==
=== Domestic ===
- Handball Extraliga
  - (3) Winners: 1994/95, 1995/96, 1997/98
  - (2) Runners-up: 2013/14, 2017/18
  - (3) 3rd place: 1996/97, 2014/15, 2016/17
- Slovak Handball cup
  - (1) Winners: 1994
