= Martin Lipták =

Czech handball coach (born 1964)

Personal information
- Nationality: Slovak
- Born: 23 March 1964 (age 62) Košice, Czechoslovakia

Sport
- Sport: Handball

Teams managed
- Years: Team
- 2008–2012: Bregenz Handball
- 2008–2012: Czech Republic
- 2012–2018: Hlohovec
- 2015–2017: Slovakia

Martin Lipták (born March 23, 1964) is a Slovak handball coach. He worked as head coach for the national handball teams of the Czech Republic and Slovakia, as well as coaching clubs in Austria and Slovakia.

== Club coaching ==
Lipták became head coach of Austrian handball club Bregenz Handball of the Handball Liga Austria at the start of the 2008–09 season. During his time with the club, he led them to national titles in 2009 and 2010. He left his position in February 2012. From March 2012, Lipták coached Slovak side HC Sporta Hlohovec until May 2018.

== National team coaching ==
Lipták became the coach of the Czech Republic men's national handball team in 2008, and signed a two-year contract extension in June 2010. He participated at the 2012 European Men's Handball Championship held in Serbia. After the Czech Republic lost to Russia in the June 2012 play-off match for the 2013 World Men's Handball Championship – European qualification his contract was not renewed, and he was replaced by Vladimír Haber in September 2012. Lipták was appointed as the head coach of the Slovakia men's national handball team in 2015, a position he held until 2017.
