= Slovenská hadzanárska extraliga =

Handball league in Slovakia

Extraliga
- Sport: Team handball
- Founded: 1993; 33 years ago
- Administrator: Slovak Handball Federation
- No. of teams: 10
- Country: Slovakia
- Confederation: EHF
- Most recent champion: HT Tatran Prešov (20th title)
- Most titles: HT Tatran Prešov (20)
- Website: Slovak Handball Federation

Niké Handball Extraliga is the highest league in the league system of Slovak Handball and comprises the top 10 Slovak handball teams. The first season began in 1993–94 and, with the exception of a 5-year break when the joint Czech-Slovak Handball Interliga (HIL) was organized, has been running since. The most successful club is HT Tatran Prešov, which has become the champion of Slovakia 20 times. Since the 2020/21 season, it has been called the Niké Handball Extraliga.

== Structure ==
The season starts in the end of September with a regular season comprising 11 teams meeting each other twice. The 8 best teams after the regular season qualify for the play-off. The season ends with a single final at the end of April.

== Current teams ==
=== Teams for season 2025–26 ===
Location of teams in 2025–26 Niké Handball Extraliga
- MŠK Považská Bystrica
- HT Tatran Prešov
- HK Kúpele Bojnice
- TJ Štart Nové Zámky
- HK Košice
- HC Sporta Hlohovec
- ŠKP Bratislava
- HK agro Topoľčany
- Záhoráci Stupava
- HáO TJ Slovan Modra

== Past champions ==
- 1994 : Lokomotiva Trnava
- 1995 : HK agro Topoľčany
- 1996 : Agro VTJ Topoľčany (2)
- 1997 : VSŽ Košice
- 1998 : Agro VTJ Topoľčany (3)
- 1999 : VSŽ Košice (2)
- 2000 : ŠKP Sečovce
- 2001 : ŠKP Sečovce (2)
- 2002 : MŠK Považská Bystrica
- 2003 : MŠK Považská Bystrica (2)
- 2004 : HT Tatran Prešov
- 2005 : HT Tatran Prešov (2)
- 2006 : MŠK Považská Bystrica (3)
- 2007 : HT Tatran Prešov (3)
- 2008 : HT Tatran Prešov (4)
- 2009 : HT Tatran Prešov (5)
- 2010 : HT Tatran Prešov (6)
- 2011 : HT Tatran Prešov (7)
- 2012 : HT Tatran Prešov (8)
- 2013 : HT Tatran Prešov (9)
- 2014 : HT Tatran Prešov (10)
- 2015 : HT Tatran Prešov (11)
- 2016 : HT Tatran Prešov (12)
- 2017 : HT Tatran Prešov (13)
- 2018 : HT Tatran Prešov (14)
- 2019 : HT Tatran Prešov (15)
- 2020 : not awarded
- 2021 : HT Tatran Prešov (16)
- 2022 : HT Tatran Prešov (17)
- 2023 : MŠK Považská Bystrica (4)
- 2024 : HT Tatran Prešov (18)
- 2025 : HT Tatran Prešov (19)
- 2026 : HT Tatran Prešov (20)

	Club	Titles	Year
1.	HT Tatran Prešov	20	2004, 2005, 2007, 2008, 2009, 2010, 2011, 2012, 2013, 2014, 2015, 2016, 2017, 2018, 2019, 2021, 2022, 2024, 2025, 2026
2.	MŠK Považská Bystrica	4	2002, 2003, 2006, 2023
3.	Agro VTJ Topoľčany	3	1995, 1996, 1998
4.	VSŽ Košice	2	1997, 1999
	ŠKP Sečovce	2	2000, 2001
6.	Lokomotiva Trnava	1	1994
