= Kolpak (hat) =

Hat worn by some Byzantine Catholic diocesan clergy

Kolpak (Ukrainian and Rusyn: Колпак) is an octagonal, onion-dome–shaped, segmented and usually collapsible hat, sometimes topped with a decorative cross, traditionally worn by Byzantine Catholic diocesan clergy of the Ruthenian and Ukrainian Greek Catholic Churches.

It is intended primarily for outdoor use. It is typically made of black cloth for lower clergy, while archpriests (or monsignors), canons and bishops wear a version made of amaranth or violet colored fabric. The kolpak is generally about 20 centimeters in height and is constructed from six sewn panels.

== History ==
The kolpak was introduced into discussion among Gallician Greek Catholic clergy in the late 19th century as a dignified and practical alternative to the Latin-style papafii (biretta), which many considered unsuitable to the Eastern tradition.

Metropolitan Joseph Sembratovych petitioned Rome for its approval, citing health reasons, and in January 1881 the Congregation for the Propagation of the Faith authorized its use in the Archeparchy of Lviv, provided it differed from Eastern Orthodox models. Clergy soon adopted the headgear, but Austrian authorities objected that it too closely resembled headwear of Orthodox clergy in Bukovina, and might encourage pro-Orthodox sentiment. The use of the kolpak declined following the Second Vatican Council, as it came to be regarded by some as a symbol of the Latinisation of liturgy.

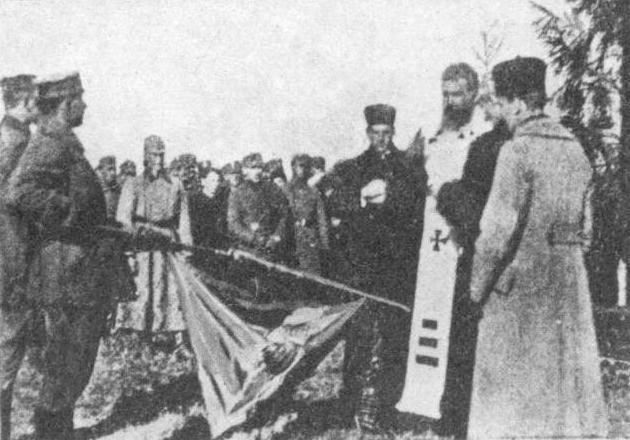
Metropolitan Sheptytsky, accompanied by priests wearing the kolpak, blessing the banner of the Ukrainian Sich Riflemen in 1917

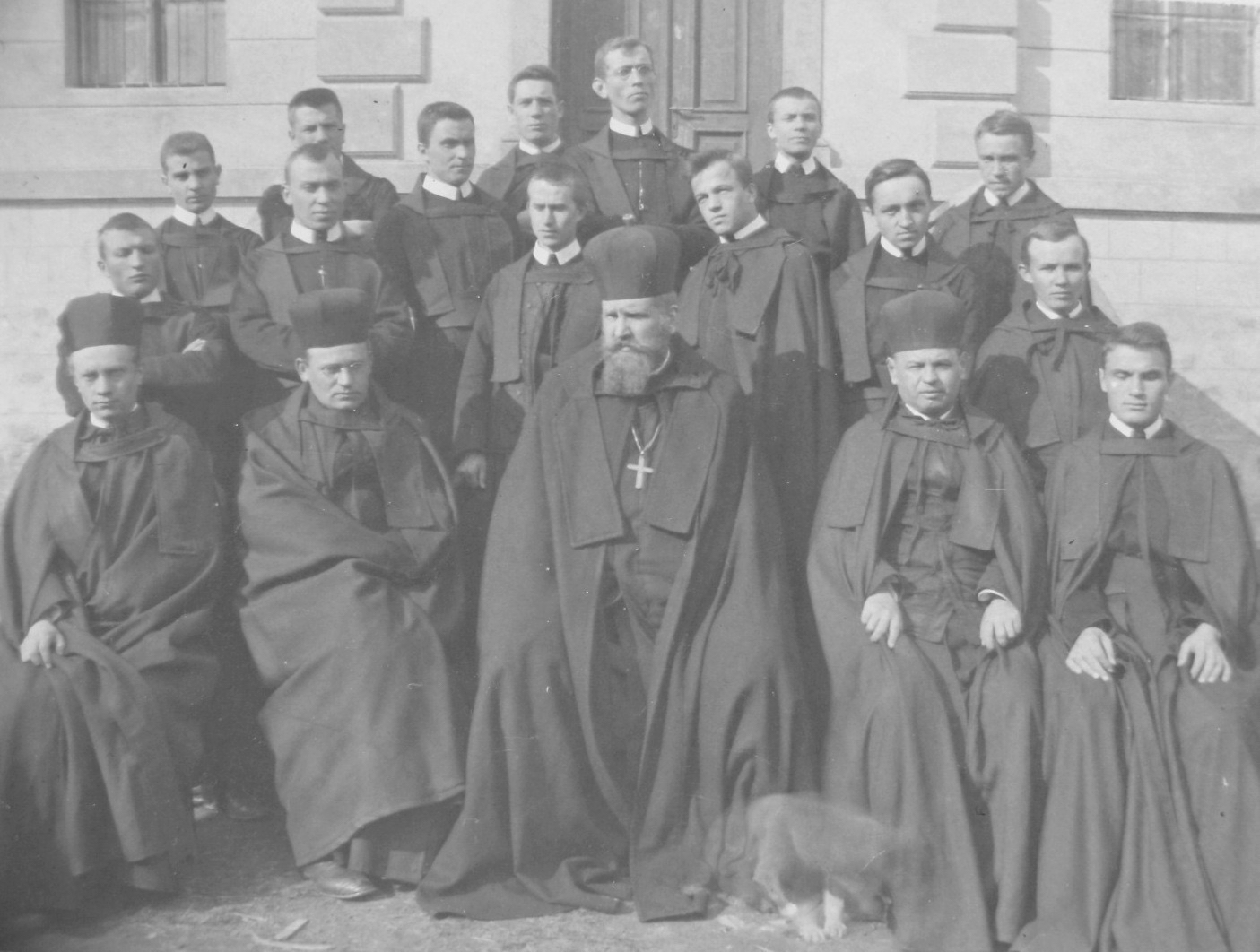
Metropolitan Sheptytsky with seminary staff and students, front-row clergy wear kolpaks
