= HT Tatran Prešov =

Slovakian handball club

Tatran Presov
- Full name: Tatran Presov Handball Team
- Short name: Tatran
- Founded: 1952
- Arena: Tatran Handball Arena
- Capacity: 4,870 seats
- President: Miloslav Chmeliar
- Head coach: Radoslav Antl
- League: Niké Handball Extraliga, EHF European League
- 2025–26: 1st
- Club colours
| Home | Away |

HT Tatran Prešov is a handball club from Prešov, Slovakia, that plays in the Niké Handball Extraliga and EHF European League.

Location of HT Tatran Prešov

== History ==
The official establishment of the club was in 1952 under the name Slavia CSSA. In 1954, Tatran qualified for the championship of Czechoslovakia, where they won their first historic bronze medal. In 1967, the national team of Czechoslovakia became world champion in Sweden. Four Tatran Prešov players were in the national team at that time: Anton Frolo, Martin Gregor, Vladimir Seruga and Rudolf Horváth. In the 1968/1969 season, Tatran won its first Czechoslovak league title. The second golden record was brought immediately by the 1970/71 season. In the 1971/72 season, Tatran achieved its greatest international success, where it only reached the semi-finals of the European Champions Cup, where VfL Gummersbach defeated it in the fight to advance to the finals. After the independence of Slovakia, from the 1993/94 season, various lobby groups took turns in the management of the club. The most difficult period of men's handball in Prešov had come, there were frequent personnel changes in the club management, financial conditions brought the club to the brink of collapse. Miloslav Chmeliar took over the club in the summer of 2001. From then on, the team became stronger financially and personally, and could finally operate under decent conditions. From 2004, Tatran developed into the most successful and strongest club in Slovakia, winning 19 championships in the next 22 years. In 2026, the club won the Slovak Handball Cup for the 26th time.

== Management ==
| Position | Name |
|---|---|
| Club Owner And Company Manager | (Slovakia) Miloslav Chmeliar |
| Manager | (Slovakia) Pavol Kožlej |
| Sports Director | (Slovakia) Jozef Gaľan |
| Marketing Manager | (Slovakia) Marián Eštočko |

== Team ==
=== Current squad ===
Squad for the 2025–26 season

HT Tatran Prešov

Goalkeepers

- 69 (Croatia) Ivan Ereš
- 73 (Slovakia) (Ukraine) Igor Chupryna
- 86 (Slovakia) Matúš Mitošinka

Left Wingers

- 3 (Slovakia) Damián Mitaľ
- 28 (Slovakia) Marco Antl

Right Wingers

- 11 (Slovakia) Erik Fenár
- 18 (Czech Republic) Josef Hozman

Line Players

- 33 (Belarus) Aliaksei Ushal
- 34 (Slovakia) Filip Jurkovič
- 55 (Slovakia) Peter Kimák-Fejko

Left Backs

- 5 (Slovakia) Jakub Valent
- 17 (Slovakia) Jakub Kravčák
- 24 (Slovakia) Dávid Turek
- 66 (Cuba) Pavel Caballero Hernandez
- 31 (Serbia) Borivoje Dukič

Central Backs

- 4 (Russia) Igor Karlov
- 10 (Montenegro) Andrej Dobrković
- 47 (Slovakia) Lukáš Urban

Right Backs

- 8 (Slovenia) Tim Jenko Bogdanić
- 19 (Slovakia) Daniel Polanský

=== Technical staff ===
- Head Coach: (Slovakia) Radoslav Antl
- Assistent: (Slovakia) Marek Gernát
- Goalkeeper Coach: (Slovakia) Maroš Kolpak
- Physiotherapist: (Slovakia) Marián Dittrich
- Masseur: (Slovakia) Tomáš Foriš

=== Transfers ===
Transfers for the 2026–27 season

Joining

- (Poland) Damian Domagała (LP) from (Poland) Wybrzeże Gdańsk
- (Slovakia) Jakub Féder (RB) from (Germany) Stralsunder HV)
- (Bosnia and Herzegovina) Njegoš Djukic (CB) (from (Serbia) RK Vranje 1093)
- (Egypt) Mohammed Essam Mourad Abdelsadek (LP) (from (Greece) P.A.O.K. H.C.)

Leaving

- (Cuba) Pavel Caballero (LB) to (Slovakia) MŠK Považská Bystrica
- (Serbia) Savo Slavujlica (RB) to (Montenegro) RK Budućnost Podgorica
- (Russia) Igor Karlov (CB) to (Russia) HBC CSKA Moscow
- (Brazil) Lucas Adriano Barros Araxá (LP) to (Cyprus) Anorthosis Famagusta H.C.
- (Slovakia) Peter Kimak - Fejko (LP) (to (Slovakia) HK Košice)
- (Slovakia) Erik Fenár (RW) (to (Slovakia) HK Košice)
- (Belarus) Aliaksei Ushal (LP) (to ?)
- (Serbia) Borivoje Djukic (LB) (to ?)

=== Transfer History ===
Transfers for the 2025–26 season

Joining

- (Belarus) Aliaksei Ushal (LP) from (Romania) CSM Bacău
- (Montenegro) Danilo Mihaljević (GK) from (Romania) CSM Vaslui
- (Montenegro) Andrej Dobrkovic (CB) from (Hungary) Dabas KK
- (Croatia) Ivan Ereš (GK) from (Romania) HC Odorheiu Secuiesc
- (Slovenia) Tim Jenko Bogdanić (RB) from (Hungary) Carbonex-Komló
- (Slovakia) Jakub Valent (LB) from (Slovakia) HK agro Topoľčany
- (Slovakia) Filip Jurkovič (P) (from (Slovakia) HO Slovan Modra)

Leaving

- (Bosnia and Herzegovina) Nikola Malivojević (LP) to (Spain) Helvetia Anaitasuna
- (Slovakia) Maroš Varga (LP) to (Slovakia) HK Košice
- (Slovakia) Tomáš Fech (RW) to (Czech Republic) HK FCC Město Lovosice
- (Slovakia) Ján Krok (CB) to (Slovakia) MŠK Považská Bystrica
- (Cuba) Yosdani Rios Ballard (LB) (to (Cyprus) Anorthosis Famagusta Handball)
- (Slovakia) Patrik Hruščák (RB) (to (Slovakia) HK Košice)
- (Slovakia) Daniil Radcenko (CB) (end of career)
- (Slovenia) Gašper Horvat (LB) (to ASV Hamm - Westfalen)

== Accomplishments ==
- National Championship of Slovakia: (20)
  - 2004, 2005, 2007, 2008, 2009, 2010, 2011, 2012, 2013, 2014, 2015, 2016, 2017, 2018, 2019, 2021, 2022, 2024, 2025, 2026
- Slovak Handball Cup: (26)
  - 1971, 1974, 1975, 1976, 1978, 1981, 1982, 2002, 2004, 2005, 2007, 2008, 2009, 2010, 2011, 2012, 2013, 2014, 2015, 2016, 2017, 2018, 2020, 2022, 2023, 2024, 2026
- EHF Champions League
  - 1/8 Final (1): 2004/05
  - Group Stage (8): 2005/06, 2007/08, 2008/09, 2010/11, 2015/16, 2016/17, 2018/19, 2019/20
- EHF European League
  - 1/4 Final: (1): 2011/12
  - 1/8 Final (1): 2009/10
  - Group Phase: (8): 2012/13, 2013/14, 2017/18, 2020/21, 2021/22, 2022/23, 2024/25, 2025/26
  - Qualification Round 3: (1): 2014/2015
- EHF European Cup
  - 1/4 Final (1): 2023/24
- EHF Cup Winners' Cup
  - 1/4 Final (1): 2005/06
  - 1/8 Final (3): 2002/03, 2007/08, 2008/09

== EHF ranking ==
As of 27/06/2026

| Rank | Team | Points |
|---|---|---|
| 57 | (Greece) AEK Athens | 74 |
| 58 | (Slovenia) RK Trimo Trebnje | 73 |
| 59 | (Slovenia) RK Gorenje Velenje | 72 |
| 60 | (Slovakia) Tatran Prešov | 70 |
| 61 | (Czech Republic) SKKP Handball Brno | 69 |
| 62 | (Denmark) Mors-Thy Håndbold | 67 |
| 63 | (Hungary) Balatonfüredi KSE | 67 |

== Coaching history ==
| Seasons | Coach | Country |
|---|---|---|
| -2003 | Martin Lipták | (Czech Republic) |
| 2003–2004 | Peter Hatalčík | (Slovakia) |
| 2004–2005 | Yuri Zhuravlyov | (Ukraine) |
| 2005–2006 | František Šulc | (Czech Republic) |
| 2006–2007 | Roman Lamač | (Slovakia) |
| 2007–2008 | Martin Lipták | (Czech Republic) |
| 2008–2011 | Rastislav Trtík | (Czech Republic) |
| 2011–2012 | Đorđe Rašić | (Serbia) |
| 2013 | Roman Lamač | (Slovakia) |
| 2013–2014 | Peter Hatalčík | (Slovakia) |
| 2014–2015 | Peter Dávid | (Slovakia) |
| 2015–2017 | Rastislav Trtík | (Czech Republic) |
| 2017–2021 | Slavko Goluža | (Croatia) |
| 2021–2022 | Radoslav Antl | (Slovakia) |
| 2022–2023 | Marek Gernát | (Slovakia) |
| 2023–2024 | Pavol Jano | (Slovakia) |
| 2024-2025 | Ratko Đurković | (Montenegro) |
| 2025- | Radoslav Antl | (Slovakia) |
