= HáO TJ Slovan Modra =

Slovak handball club

- Founded: 1954; 72 years ago
- League: Slovenská hadzanárska extraliga
- Club colours

HáO TJ Slovan Modra (also known as HO Slovan Modra) is a Slovak handball club based in Modra. The club was founded in 1954. The men's team participates in the highest domestic competition, the Slovenská hadzanárska extraliga, which it entered as the winner of the 1st league for the first time in 2012. The women's team was a participant in the 1st league, but later was suspended of its activities after the 2011/12 season and resumed it only in 2018. In addition to senior teams, the club also has youth and student teams. Long-time Slovak representatives such as Katarína Dubajová and Juraj Nižnan have played for the club.

== History ==
The Slovan Modra handball club was founded in 1954 by Ján Lauda, Ján Šimonovič, Jozef Zápražný, and Stanislav Škarčák. It started with a men's team and expanded to include junior and senior teams by 1958. By 1959, the teams achieved 4th place in the Slovak Championship, and in 1960, the men won the regional competition, promoting them to the 2nd league. The club stagnated in the 1970s but was revitalized in 1977 through new leadership focusing on youth education, leading to increased success both domestically and internationally. Notable milestones include the founding of the School Sports Center in 1983, regional second-place finishes for women and men in the late 1980s, and reaching the finals of the Slovak Junior High School Championship in 1991. In 1992, both men and women advanced to the 1st league. The club achieved success in the 1990s, with the younger students winning the Slovak Championship in 1995, and both older girls and students earning silver medals in 1996. In 2012, the club was promoted to the highest competition, the Slovenská hadzanárska extraliga, after winning the second division. In the 2024–25 season, following a win against HK Dunajska Streda in the relegation play-offs, Slovan Modra would survive in the first division after playing in the play-offs for a third time in a row.

== Honors ==
=== Domestic ===
Slovak second handball league

- Winners (1): 2011–2012
