= Maroš Kolpak =

Slovak handball player and coach (born 1971)

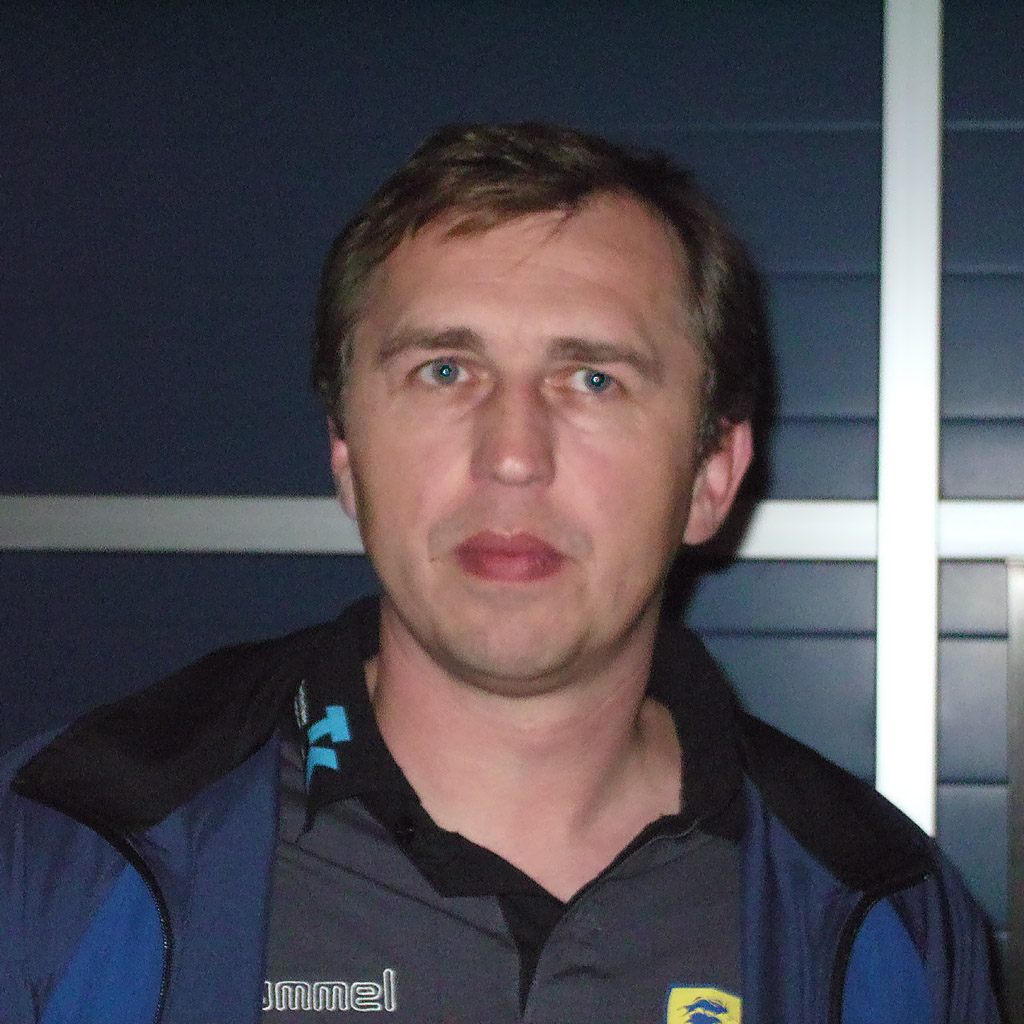
Maroš Kolpak (2008)

Maroš Kolpak (born 23 March 1971) is a Slovak handball goalkeeper and coach. Kolpak played 71 national team games for Slovakia. His legal actions in Germany set a precedent for professional sports in Europe, known as the Kolpak ruling, which have had a wide-ranging effect, especially in regards to English county cricket and British professional rugby union.

Kolpak played for HT Tatran Prešov, HC Dukla Praha and HK VSŽ Košice before moving to TSV Baden Östringen in the German 2nd Bundesliga in 1997. He played for the club and its successor SG Kronau/Östringen (now Rhein-Neckar Löwen) for ten seasons, though he missed most of the 2002–03 and 2003–04 seasons due to a torn anterior cruciate ligament. It was during this time that he was discharged from his club because of a quota for non-European Union players set in the league. In 2003 he presented his case to play against the Deutscher Handballbund (German Handball Federation) to the European Court of Justice, which ruled in his favour, thereby setting a precedent, now known as the Kolpak ruling.

Kolpak and Kronau/Östringen were promoted to the Bundesliga in 2003 and 2005, with a highest Bundesliga placing of sixth in 2006, reached the final of the DHB-Pokal in 2006 and 2007, and played in the last 16 of the EHF Cup in 2007. In 2006 Kolpak was also elected as the best goalkeeper of the final four of the DHB-Pokal.

As of 2023, Kolpak is working as goalkeeping coach at HT Tatran Prešov.
