= Kolpak ruling =

2003 European Court of Justice ruling

- European Court of Justice

Submitted 28 November 2000 Decided 8 May 2003
- Full case name: Deutscher Handballbund eV v Maros Kolpak
- Case: C-438/00
- CelexID: 62000J0438
- Case type: Reference for a preliminary ruling
- Chamber: Fifth chamber
- Nationality of parties: Germany
- Procedural history: Oberlandesgericht Hamm, Beschluß vom 15 November 2000 (8 U 139/98)

Ruling
- The first indent of Article 38(1) of the Europe Agreement establishing an association between the European Communities and their Member States, of the one part, and the Slovak Republic, of the other part, signed in Luxembourg on 4 October 1993 and approved on behalf of the Communities by Decision 94/909/ECSC, EEC, Euratom of the Council and the Commission of 19 December 1994, must be construed as precluding the application to a professional sportsman of Slovak nationality, who is lawfully employed by a club established in a Member State, of a rule drawn up by a sports federation in that State under which clubs are authorised to field, during league or cup matches, only a limited number of players from non-member countries that are not parties to the Agreement on the European Economic Area.

Court composition
- President; Gil Carlos Rodriguez Iglesias
- Judge Rapporteur; Antonio Mario La Pergola
- Advocate General; Christine Stix-Hackl

Legislation affecting
- Interprets article 38 of the Europe Agreement with Slovakia

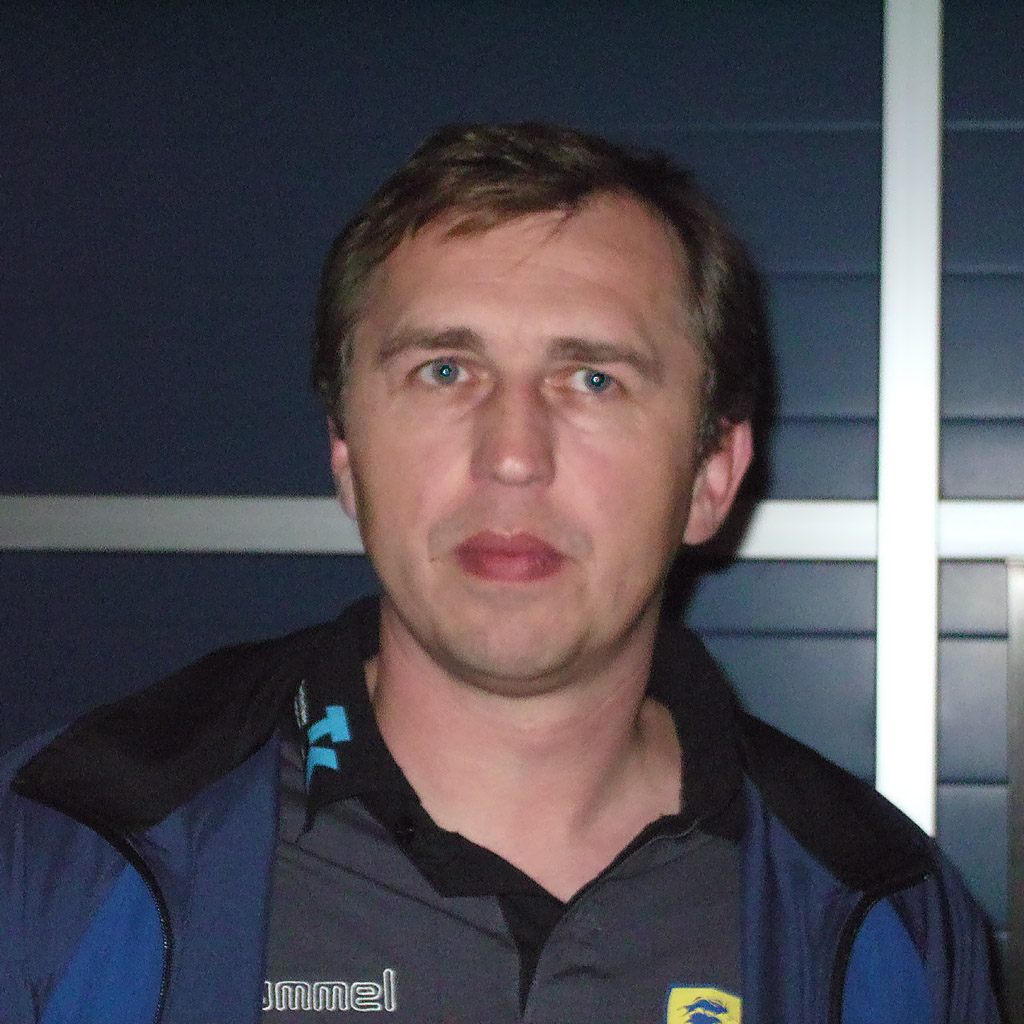
Maroš Kolpak, handball goalkeeper from Slovakia

The Kolpak ruling is a European Court of Justice ruling handed down on 8 May 2003 in favour of Maroš Kolpak, a Slovak handball player. It held that certain nationals of countries with Association Agreements containing non-discrimination provisions (such as the EU–Slovakia Europe Agreement) could not be discriminated against in employment once they were lawfully employed in an EU member state. It did not grant them the same general freedom of movement as EU citizens. Thus nationality-based quotas applied to lawfully employed players covered by the relevant Association Agreements were found to be incompatible with EU law. The judgment in Germany had significant implications for professional sports in Europe, which have had a wide-ranging effect, especially in regard to English county cricket and European professional rugby.

Kolpak player, or Kolpak, was a term used in the United Kingdom for people from overseas playing in the domestic leagues in cricket and both rugby codes, who were subject to the Kolpak ruling. However, the system no longer applies in the UK, following its exit from the European Union, which came into effect in 2020.

== Court ruling ==
The Court of Justice's Bosman ruling in 1995 declared that, in accordance with the EC Treaty rules regarding freedom of movement for workers, no citizen of the European Union should be restricted from working in another part of the EU on the grounds of their nationality. For example, a German football team could not be prevented from signing a Greek player, because both nations are members of the EU.

Maroš Kolpak was a Slovak handball player, who was legally resident and working in Germany, and had been playing for the German second division handball side TSV Östringen since 1997. The German Handball Association had a rule (Rule 15) which prohibited its member clubs from fielding more than two non-EU citizens. At that time, Slovakia was not yet a member of the European Union (it joined the EU in May 2004), and therefore the Bosman ruling did not apply to its citizens. Slovakia did however have an Association Agreement with the European Union.

Kolpak was ejected by his club in 2000 because they had filled their quota of two non-EU players. Kolpak challenged the German Handball Association, claiming that Rule 15, by treating him differently from German citizens, placed an illegal restriction on his freedom of movement as a worker. The German Handball Association held that equality of treatment applied only to citizens of European Union countries (as per the Bosman Ruling) and not to non-EU citizens. The case was referred by the German higher court to the European Court of Justice, for a determination on whether the Association Agreement between Slovakia and the European Union provided equal rights for Slovak workers who were living and working legally within the EU. The Court ruled in favour of Kolpak.

Thus the Kolpak Ruling declares that citizens of countries which have applicable Association Agreements with the EU, and who are lawfully working within an EU country, have equal rights to work as EU citizens, and cannot have restrictions such as quotas placed upon them. Such countries include those within the African, Caribbean and Pacific (ACP) group of states, such as South Africa, Jamaica and Zimbabwe.

== Implications for sport ==
=== Cricket ===
In practice, the decision allowed English county cricket clubs to employ the services of a multitude of overseas cricketers, especially from South Africa. Prior to the Kolpak ruling ECB rules had limited each county to one overseas (non-EU) professional.

County cricket clubs could already employ any number of EU residents under the Bosman ruling. However, there were no other Test cricket nations within the EU except (from 2017) Ireland; this explains why it was Kolpak, not Bosman, which had a significant impact on English county cricket. The largest group of countries with an association agreement with the EU is the ACP Group of States, which includes South Africa, Zimbabwe, and many of the nations that supply the West Indies cricket team.

The English and Wales Cricket Board ruled that a player must not have represented their own country for over twelve months in order to qualify for Kolpak status, but after South African Jacques Rudolph signed for Yorkshire, they admitted that this rule was unenforceable.

In an effort to combat the influx of Kolpak players, the ECB linked the central payments made to counties to the number of English qualified players who play for that county. That meant that every game a Kolpak player played instead of an English qualified player, a county received £1,100 less from the ECB. Because that was classed as a way of encouraging counties to develop young players who could go on to play for England, rather than a restrictive quota system, it was legal under the EU rules. However, the system did not result in a significant drop in the number of Kolpak players, because counties chose to continue to sign foreign players, rather than maximise their handout from the ECB. The influx reached a peak in 2008 when, during a match between Northamptonshire and Leicestershire, half the players on the field were from non-EU countries.

In 2008, the EU changed its reading of the Cotonou Agreement, the Association Agreement between the EU and the ACP countries. It then stated that the Cotonou agreement should not be interpreted as mandating free movement of labour, but rather the free trade of goods and services. The Home Office was subsequently able to introduce new rules placing restrictions on Kolpak players, stating that only those who had held a valid work permit for four years had the right to be treated the same as EU citizens.

After the UK withdrew from the European Union on 31 January 2020, the Kolpak ruling ceased to have any effect there at the end of 2020.

=== Rugby ===
In rugby league and rugby union, the Kolpak ruling has allowed teams to sign many players from Fiji, Tonga, Samoa and South Africa, all of which are also ACP countries. Many rugby union clubs have also signed South African players under Kolpak, most notably the French team RC Toulonnais and English team Saracens F.C.

In a related issue, New Zealand player Andrew Mehrtens, who was born in Durban, decided to pursue a South African passport when he signed with the English side Harlequins for the 2005–06 National Division One season, as it would enable the club to sign another non-EU and non-Kolpak player.

== See also ==
- Bosman ruling, a similar case covering freedom of movement for EU citizens
- List of Kolpak cricketers
