= HC Sporta Hlohovec =

Slovakian handball club

- Full name: HC Sporta Hlohovec
- Short name: Sporta
- Founded: 1951
- Arena: Sportová Hala Na Zábran
- Capacity: 2,005
- League: Extraliga
- 2015-16: 2nd
Home	Away

HC Sporta Hlohovec is a Slovak handball team located in Hlohovec. Their home matches are played at the Sportová Hala Na Zábraní. They compete in Extraliga.

== Crest, colours, supporters ==
=== Kits ===
HOME
2015–16	2016–17	2019–20

AWAY

2020–21

== Club names ==
- 1951 – 1999 : TJ Odeva Hlohovec
- 1963 – 1993 : TJ Drôtovňa Hlohovec
- 1999 – 2011 : MŠK Hlohovec
- since 2011 : HC SPORTA Hlohovec

== Accomplishments ==
- Extraliga:
  - Runners Up (1) : 2010, 2012, 2013

== European record ==
Season	Competition	Round	Club	1st leg	2nd leg	Aggregate
2016–17	EHF Cup	R2	(Russia) Dinamo Astrakhan	29–33	20–27	49–60

== Team ==
=== Current squad ===
Squad for the 2016–17 season

Goalkeepers

- (Slovakia) Juraj Kastak
- (Slovakia) Michal Martin Konecny

Wingers
RW

- (Slovakia) Matej Takac
- (Slovakia) Igor Vanko

LW

- (Slovakia) Martin Briatka
- (Slovakia) Lukas Pechy
- (Slovakia) Frantisek Zatko

Line players

- (Slovakia) Tomas Laho
- (Slovakia) Gabriel Papp

Back players
LB

- (Serbia) Luka Dacevic
- (Slovakia) Marian Hajko
- (Slovakia) Lukas Rakus

CB

- (Slovakia) Lukas Majbik
- (Slovakia) Tomas Tschur

RB

- (Moldova) Igor Chiseliov
- (Slovakia) Lukas Hirtl
- (Slovakia) Matus Hrinak

==== Transfers ====
Transfers for the 2025–26 season

Joining

- (Slovakia) Lukáš Péchy (LW) back from loan at (Slovakia) HC DAC Dunajská Streda

Leaving

- (Slovakia) Lukáš Péchy (LW) to (Slovakia) MŠK Považská Bystrica
