= František Šulc =

Czech handball player (born 1950)

František Šulc (born 8 June 1950) is a Czech former handball player who competed for Czechoslovakia in the 1976 Summer Olympics.

He was born in Chotěboř.

In 1976 he was part of the Czechoslovak team which finished seventh in the Olympic tournament. He played all five matches and scored twelve goals.

He is the father of the Slovak handball player František Šulc Jr..
