= 2019 World Men's Handball Championship – European qualification =

The European qualification for the 2019 World Men's Handball Championship, in Denmark and Germany, was contested in two rounds among the teams that did not qualify for the 2018 European Men's Handball Championship and the 12 teams that did play this tournament but was not already qualified and failed to qualify through it.

In the first round of qualification, 23 teams not participating at the European Championship were split into six groups; the group winners advanced to the second round, joining the 12 European finalists not already qualified for the 2019 World Championships (Denmark and Germany has qualified as hosts, France has qualified as defending champions and Spain has qualified as the European Champion). These 18 teams then were paired to play a two-legged playoff tie to determine the nine remaining World Championship qualifiers from Europe.

== Qualification stage 1 ==
All times are local.

=== Group 1 ===
Pos	Team	Pld	W	D	L	GF	GA	GD	Pts	Qualification
1	Russia	6	6	0	0	190	132	+58	12	Qualification stage 2
2	Slovakia	6	3	0	3	162	149	+13	6	
3	Finland	6	1	1	4	139	170	−31	3 (Note: Finland 53–48 Luxembourg)	
4	Luxembourg	6	1	1	4	131	171	−40	3	

Source: Eurohandball
Rules for classification: 1) points; 2) head-to-head points; 3) head-to-head goal difference; 4) head-to-head number of goals scored; 5) goal difference.
Notes:

25 October 2017; 19:00	Luxembourg	23–23	Finland	d'Coque, Luxembourg City; Attendance: 550; Referees: Hofer, Schmidhuber (AUT)
25 October 2017; 19:00	Wirtz 8	(14–10)	Rönnberg 5	d'Coque, Luxembourg City; Attendance: 550; Referees: Hofer, Schmidhuber (AUT)
25 October 2017; 19:00	2× (yellow card) 7× (suspension)	Report	2× (yellow card) 4× (suspension)	d'Coque, Luxembourg City; Attendance: 550; Referees: Hofer, Schmidhuber (AUT)

26 October 2017; 19:30	Russia	32–22	Slovakia	Sibur Arena, Saint Petersburg; Attendance: 3,000; Referees: Nikolić, Stojković (SRB)
26 October 2017; 19:30	Dibirov 7	(20–11)	Krok 5	Sibur Arena, Saint Petersburg; Attendance: 3,000; Referees: Nikolić, Stojković (SRB)
26 October 2017; 19:30	2× (yellow card) 4× (suspension)	Report	3× (yellow card) 3× (suspension)	Sibur Arena, Saint Petersburg; Attendance: 3,000; Referees: Nikolić, Stojković (SRB)

28 October 2017; 17:00	Finland	22–35	Russia	Energia Areena, Vantaa; Attendance: 1,160; Referees: Harabagiu, Stănescu (ROU)
28 October 2017; 17:00	Tamminen 6	(10–16)	Kovalyov, Santalov 6	Energia Areena, Vantaa; Attendance: 1,160; Referees: Harabagiu, Stănescu (ROU)
28 October 2017; 17:00	3× (yellow card) 2× (suspension)	Report	3× (yellow card) 1× (suspension)	Energia Areena, Vantaa; Attendance: 1,160; Referees: Harabagiu, Stănescu (ROU)

29 October 2017; 15:00	Slovakia	36–19	Luxembourg	MŠK Sports Hall, Považská Bystrica; Attendance: 1,300; Referees: Argyridis, Mouttas (CYP)
29 October 2017; 15:00	Michalka 5	(19–6)	four players 3	MŠK Sports Hall, Považská Bystrica; Attendance: 1,300; Referees: Argyridis, Mouttas (CYP)
29 October 2017; 15:00	3× (yellow card) 4× (suspension)	Report	2× (yellow card) 5× (suspension)	MŠK Sports Hall, Považská Bystrica; Attendance: 1,300; Referees: Argyridis, Mouttas (CYP)

3 January 2018; 19:00	Luxembourg	19–27	Russia	d'Coque, Luxembourg City; Attendance: 850; Referees: Martins, Martins (POR)
3 January 2018; 19:00	Bardina 5	(8–12)	Dibirov 8	d'Coque, Luxembourg City; Attendance: 850; Referees: Martins, Martins (POR)
3 January 2018; 19:00	3× (yellow card) 2× (suspension)	Report	2× (yellow card) 4× (suspension)	d'Coque, Luxembourg City; Attendance: 850; Referees: Martins, Martins (POR)

4 January 2018; 18:30	Finland	22–27	Slovakia	Energia Areena, Vantaa; Attendance: 1,000; Referees: Hermann, Madsen (DEN)
4 January 2018; 18:30	Granlund, Rönnberg 6	(9–13)	Volentics 11	Energia Areena, Vantaa; Attendance: 1,000; Referees: Hermann, Madsen (DEN)
4 January 2018; 18:30	3× (yellow card) 2× (suspension)	Report	3× (yellow card) 3× (suspension)	Energia Areena, Vantaa; Attendance: 1,000; Referees: Hermann, Madsen (DEN)

6 January 2018; 16:00	Russia	28–17	Luxembourg	Olympus Arena, Krasnodar; Attendance: 2,300; Referees: Ben-Dan, Faran (ISR)
6 January 2018; 16:00	Santalov, Shishkaryov 4	(15–10)	three players 3	Olympus Arena, Krasnodar; Attendance: 2,300; Referees: Ben-Dan, Faran (ISR)
6 January 2018; 16:00	2× (yellow card) 6× (suspension)	Report	3× (yellow card) 6× (suspension)	Olympus Arena, Krasnodar; Attendance: 2,300; Referees: Ben-Dan, Faran (ISR)

7 January 2018; 15:00	Slovakia	24–16	Finland	MŠK Sports Hall, Považská Bystrica; Attendance: 1,300; Referees: Aliyev, Aghakishiyev (AZE)
7 January 2018; 15:00	Antl 6	(12–8)	Granlund 6	MŠK Sports Hall, Považská Bystrica; Attendance: 1,300; Referees: Aliyev, Aghakishiyev (AZE)
7 January 2018; 15:00	3× (yellow card) 2× (suspension)	Report	3× (yellow card) 3× (suspension)	MŠK Sports Hall, Považská Bystrica; Attendance: 1,300; Referees: Aliyev, Aghakishiyev (AZE)

11 January 2018; 18:30	Slovakia	26–32	Russia	MŠK Sports Hall, Považská Bystrica; Attendance: 1,400; Referees: Gasmi, Gasmi (FRA)
11 January 2018; 18:30	Mikita, Volentics 6	(11–15)	three players 5	MŠK Sports Hall, Považská Bystrica; Attendance: 1,400; Referees: Gasmi, Gasmi (FRA)
11 January 2018; 18:30	3× (yellow card) 2× (suspension)	Report	2× (yellow card) 4× (suspension)	MŠK Sports Hall, Považská Bystrica; Attendance: 1,400; Referees: Gasmi, Gasmi (FRA)

11 January 2018; 18:30	Finland	30–25	Luxembourg	Energia Areena, Vantaa; Attendance: 800; Referees: Doychinov, Goretsov (BUL)
11 January 2018; 18:30	Rönnberg 12	(13–13)	Hoffmann 8	Energia Areena, Vantaa; Attendance: 800; Referees: Doychinov, Goretsov (BUL)
11 January 2018; 18:30	3× (yellow card) 3× (suspension)	Report	1× (yellow card) 3× (suspension)	Energia Areena, Vantaa; Attendance: 800; Referees: Doychinov, Goretsov (BUL)

13 January 2018; 16:00	Russia	36–26	Finland	Basket-Hall Kazan, Kazan; Attendance: 4,900; Referees: Covalciuc, Covalciuc (MDA)
13 January 2018; 16:00	Kiselev 7	(16–11)	Rönnberg 9	Basket-Hall Kazan, Kazan; Attendance: 4,900; Referees: Covalciuc, Covalciuc (MDA)
13 January 2018; 16:00	3× (yellow card) 3× (suspension)	Report	3× (yellow card) 1× (suspension)	Basket-Hall Kazan, Kazan; Attendance: 4,900; Referees: Covalciuc, Covalciuc (MDA)

14 January 2018; 18:00	Luxembourg	28–27	Slovakia	d'Coque, Luxembourg City; Attendance: 850; Referees: Katsikis, Michailidis (GRE)
14 January 2018; 18:00	Hoffmann 6	(12–11)	Volentics 8	d'Coque, Luxembourg City; Attendance: 850; Referees: Katsikis, Michailidis (GRE)
14 January 2018; 18:00	3× (yellow card) 2× (suspension)	Report	3× (yellow card) 5× (suspension)	d'Coque, Luxembourg City; Attendance: 850; Referees: Katsikis, Michailidis (GRE)

=== Group 2 ===
The group was played in a tournament format.

Pos	Team	Pld	W	D	L	GF	GA	GD	Pts	Qualification
1	Lithuania (H)	3	3	0	0	89	67	+22	6	Qualification stage 2
2	Latvia	3	2	0	1	80	78	+2	4	
3	Georgia	3	0	1	2	64	71	−7	1 (Note: Israel 23–23 Georgia)	
4	Israel	3	0	1	2	71	88	−17	1	

Source: Eurohandball
Rules for classification: 1) points; 2) head-to-head points; 3) head-to-head goal difference; 4) head-to-head number of goals scored; 5) Goal difference.
(H) Hosts
Notes:

12 January 2018; 16:30	Latvia	24–21	Georgia	Švyturio Arena, Klaipėda; Attendance: 300; Referees: Kaluđerović, Vujačić (MNE)
12 January 2018; 16:30	Jurdžs 5	(11–12)	Tskhovrebadze 7	Švyturio Arena, Klaipėda; Attendance: 300; Referees: Kaluđerović, Vujačić (MNE)
12 January 2018; 16:30	2× (yellow card) 3× (suspension)	Report	3× (yellow card) 6× (suspension)	Švyturio Arena, Klaipėda; Attendance: 300; Referees: Kaluđerović, Vujačić (MNE)

12 January 2018; 19:00	Lithuania	36–20	Israel	Švyturio Arena, Klaipėda; Attendance: 800; Referees: Boričić, Marković (SRB)
12 January 2018; 19:00	Malašinskas 9	(17–7)	Gera, Levy 5	Švyturio Arena, Klaipėda; Attendance: 800; Referees: Boričić, Marković (SRB)
12 January 2018; 19:00	3× (yellow card) 4× (suspension)	Report	3× (yellow card) 2× (suspension)	Švyturio Arena, Klaipėda; Attendance: 800; Referees: Boričić, Marković (SRB)

13 January 2018; 15:30	Israel	28–29	Latvia	Švyturio Arena, Klaipėda; Attendance: 350; Referees: Boričić, Marković (SRB)
13 January 2018; 15:30	three players 6	(15–15)	Jurdžs 9	Švyturio Arena, Klaipėda; Attendance: 350; Referees: Boričić, Marković (SRB)
13 January 2018; 15:30	3× (yellow card) 5× (suspension)	Report	3× (yellow card) 4× (suspension)	Švyturio Arena, Klaipėda; Attendance: 350; Referees: Boričić, Marković (SRB)

13 January 2018; 18:00	Georgia	20–24	Lithuania	Švyturio Arena, Klaipėda; Attendance: 1,050; Referees: Kaluđerović, Vujačić (MNE)
13 January 2018; 18:00	Chikovani 6	(11–12)	Dumčius, Palevičius 4	Švyturio Arena, Klaipėda; Attendance: 1,050; Referees: Kaluđerović, Vujačić (MNE)
13 January 2018; 18:00	3× (yellow card) 4× (suspension)	Report	3× (yellow card) 4× (suspension)	Švyturio Arena, Klaipėda; Attendance: 1,050; Referees: Kaluđerović, Vujačić (MNE)

14 January 2018; 14:30	Israel	23–23	Georgia	Švyturio Arena, Klaipėda; Attendance: 200; Referees: Kaluđerović, Vujačić (MNE)
14 January 2018; 14:30	three players 4	(12–12)	Orjonikidze 7	Švyturio Arena, Klaipėda; Attendance: 200; Referees: Kaluđerović, Vujačić (MNE)
14 January 2018; 14:30	3× (yellow card)	Report	3× (yellow card) 4× (suspension)	Švyturio Arena, Klaipėda; Attendance: 200; Referees: Kaluđerović, Vujačić (MNE)

14 January 2018; 17:00	Lithuania	29–27	Latvia	Švyturio Arena, Klaipėda; Attendance: 1,800; Referees: Boričić, Marković (SRB)
14 January 2018; 17:00	Malašinskas 10	(15–15)	Jurdžs 10	Švyturio Arena, Klaipėda; Attendance: 1,800; Referees: Boričić, Marković (SRB)
14 January 2018; 17:00	3× (yellow card) 4× (suspension)	Report	3× (yellow card) 3× (suspension)	Švyturio Arena, Klaipėda; Attendance: 1,800; Referees: Boričić, Marković (SRB)

=== Group 3 ===
The group was played in a tournament format.

Pos	Team	Pld	W	D	L	GF	GA	GD	Pts	Qualification
1	Romania	3	2	1	0	88	70	+18	5	Qualification stage 2
2	Italy (H)	3	2	0	1	82	80	+2	4	
3	Ukraine	3	1	1	1	84	77	+7	3	
4	Faroe Islands	3	0	0	3	60	87	−27	0	

Source: Eurohandball
Rules for classification: 1) points; 2) head-to-head points; 3) head-to-head goal difference; 4) head-to-head number of goals scored; 5) goal difference.
(H) Hosts

11 January 2018; 16:30	Ukraine	30–22	Faroe Islands	PalaResia, Bolzano; Attendance: 300; Referees: Leszczyński, Piechota (POL)
11 January 2018; 16:30	Kozakevych 7	(17–13)	Krogh 7	PalaResia, Bolzano; Attendance: 300; Referees: Leszczyński, Piechota (POL)
11 January 2018; 16:30	3× (yellow card) 7× (suspension)	Report	3× (yellow card) 3× (suspension)	PalaResia, Bolzano; Attendance: 300; Referees: Leszczyński, Piechota (POL)

11 January 2018; 19:00	Romania	34–24	Italy	PalaResia, Bolzano; Attendance: 1,550; Referees: Baumgart, Wild (GER)
11 January 2018; 19:00	Șimicu 9	(18–13)	Moretti 8	PalaResia, Bolzano; Attendance: 1,550; Referees: Baumgart, Wild (GER)
11 January 2018; 19:00	3× (yellow card) 1× (suspension)	Report	3× (yellow card) 2× (suspension)	PalaResia, Bolzano; Attendance: 1,550; Referees: Baumgart, Wild (GER)

12 January 2018; 16:30	Faroe Islands	20–28	Romania	PalaResia, Bolzano; Attendance: 300; Referees: Leszczyński, Piechota (POL)
12 January 2018; 16:30	four players 3	(10–15)	Csepreghi 8	PalaResia, Bolzano; Attendance: 300; Referees: Leszczyński, Piechota (POL)
12 January 2018; 16:30	2× (yellow card) 5× (suspension) 1× (red card)	Report	3× (yellow card) 4× (suspension)	PalaResia, Bolzano; Attendance: 300; Referees: Leszczyński, Piechota (POL)

12 January 2018; 19:00	Italy	29–28	Ukraine	PalaResia, Bolzano; Attendance: 1,630; Referees: Baumgart, Wild (GER)
12 January 2018; 19:00	Skatar 11	(16–14)	Denysov, Onufryienko 7	PalaResia, Bolzano; Attendance: 1,630; Referees: Baumgart, Wild (GER)
12 January 2018; 19:00	3× (yellow card) 2× (suspension)	Report	3× (yellow card) 2× (suspension)	PalaResia, Bolzano; Attendance: 1,630; Referees: Baumgart, Wild (GER)

13 January 2018; 18:15	Romania	26–26	Ukraine	PalaResia, Bolzano; Attendance: 1,690; Referees: Baumgart, Wild (GER)
13 January 2018; 18:15	Grigoraș 10	(11–14)	four players 4	PalaResia, Bolzano; Attendance: 1,690; Referees: Baumgart, Wild (GER)
13 January 2018; 18:15	3× (yellow card) 4× (suspension)	Report	2× (yellow card) 5× (suspension) 1× (red card)	PalaResia, Bolzano; Attendance: 1,690; Referees: Baumgart, Wild (GER)

13 January 2018; 20:45	Italy	29–18	Faroe Islands	PalaResia, Bolzano; Attendance: 1,700; Referees: Leszczyński, Piechota (POL)
13 January 2018; 20:45	Turković 7	(13–10)	Krogh 4	PalaResia, Bolzano; Attendance: 1,700; Referees: Leszczyński, Piechota (POL)
13 January 2018; 20:45	3× (yellow card) 4× (suspension)	Report	3× (yellow card) 3× (suspension)	PalaResia, Bolzano; Attendance: 1,700; Referees: Leszczyński, Piechota (POL)

=== Group 4 ===
The group was played in a tournament format.

Pos	Team	Pld	W	D	L	GF	GA	GD	Pts	Qualification
1	Portugal (H)	3	2	1	0	110	65	+45	5 (Note: Portugal 27–27 Poland)	Qualification stage 2
2	Poland	3	2	1	0	103	59	+44	5	
3	Cyprus	3	1	0	2	53	115	−62	2	
4	Kosovo	3	0	0	3	63	90	−27	0	

Source: Eurohandball
Rules for classification: 1) points; 2) head-to-head points; 3) head-to-head goal difference; 4) head-to-head number of goals scored; 5) Goal difference.
(H) Hosts
Notes:

12 January 2018; 17:15	Poland	30–19	Kosovo	Pavilhão Desportivo Municipal da Póvoa de Varzim, Póvoa de Varzim; Attendance: 600; Referees: Frieser, Kavulič (CZE)
12 January 2018; 17:15	Moryto 10	(13–12)	Abdullahi 6	Pavilhão Desportivo Municipal da Póvoa de Varzim, Póvoa de Varzim; Attendance: 600; Referees: Frieser, Kavulič (CZE)
12 January 2018; 17:15	3× (yellow card) 3× (suspension)	Report	4× (yellow card) 5× (suspension) 1× (red card)	Pavilhão Desportivo Municipal da Póvoa de Varzim, Póvoa de Varzim; Attendance: 600; Referees: Frieser, Kavulič (CZE)

12 January 2018; 19:30	Portugal	47–16	Cyprus	Pavilhão Desportivo Municipal da Póvoa de Varzim, Póvoa de Varzim; Attendance: 1,000; Referees: Mata, López (ESP)
12 January 2018; 19:30	Duarte 7	(22–7)	Argyrou 6	Pavilhão Desportivo Municipal da Póvoa de Varzim, Póvoa de Varzim; Attendance: 1,000; Referees: Mata, López (ESP)
12 January 2018; 19:30	2× (yellow card) 3× (suspension)	Report	1× (yellow card) 5× (suspension)	Pavilhão Desportivo Municipal da Póvoa de Varzim, Póvoa de Varzim; Attendance: 1,000; Referees: Mata, López (ESP)

13 January 2018; 18:00	Kosovo	22–36	Portugal	Pavilhão Desportivo Municipal da Póvoa de Varzim, Póvoa de Varzim; Attendance: 1,000; Referees: Mata, López (ESP)
13 January 2018; 18:00	Terziqi 5	(11–17)	Portela, Soares Martins 5	Pavilhão Desportivo Municipal da Póvoa de Varzim, Póvoa de Varzim; Attendance: 1,000; Referees: Mata, López (ESP)
13 January 2018; 18:00	3× (yellow card) 5× (suspension) 1× (red card)	Report	3× (yellow card) 2× (suspension)	Pavilhão Desportivo Municipal da Póvoa de Varzim, Póvoa de Varzim; Attendance: 1,000; Referees: Mata, López (ESP)

13 January 2018; 20:30	Cyprus	13–46	Poland	Pavilhão Desportivo Municipal da Póvoa de Varzim, Póvoa de Varzim; Attendance: 500; Referees: Frieser, Kavulič (CZE)
13 January 2018; 20:30	Argyrou, Prountzos 4	(8–23)	Daszek 8	Pavilhão Desportivo Municipal da Póvoa de Varzim, Póvoa de Varzim; Attendance: 500; Referees: Frieser, Kavulič (CZE)
13 January 2018; 20:30	3× (yellow card) 2× (suspension)	Report	3× (yellow card) 2× (suspension)	Pavilhão Desportivo Municipal da Póvoa de Varzim, Póvoa de Varzim; Attendance: 500; Referees: Frieser, Kavulič (CZE)

14 January 2018; 15:30	Cyprus	24–22	Kosovo	Pavilhão Desportivo Municipal da Póvoa de Varzim, Póvoa de Varzim; Attendance: 500; Referees: Frieser, Kavulič (CZE)
14 January 2018; 15:30	Argyrou 12	(14–14)	Ahmeti, Hoxha 4	Pavilhão Desportivo Municipal da Póvoa de Varzim, Póvoa de Varzim; Attendance: 500; Referees: Frieser, Kavulič (CZE)
14 January 2018; 15:30	2× (yellow card) 5× (suspension)	Report	3× (yellow card) 4× (suspension)	Pavilhão Desportivo Municipal da Póvoa de Varzim, Póvoa de Varzim; Attendance: 500; Referees: Frieser, Kavulič (CZE)

14 January 2018; 18:00	Portugal	27–27	Poland	Pavilhão Desportivo Municipal da Póvoa de Varzim, Póvoa de Varzim; Attendance: 2,500; Referees: Mata, López (ESP)
14 January 2018; 18:00	Duarte, Portela 6	(15–13)	Gębala 6	Pavilhão Desportivo Municipal da Póvoa de Varzim, Póvoa de Varzim; Attendance: 2,500; Referees: Mata, López (ESP)
14 January 2018; 18:00	3× (yellow card) 4× (suspension)	Report	3× (yellow card) 3× (suspension)	Pavilhão Desportivo Municipal da Póvoa de Varzim, Póvoa de Varzim; Attendance: 2,500; Referees: Mata, López (ESP)

=== Group 5 ===
Pos	Team	Pld	W	D	L	GF	GA	GD	Pts	Qualification
1	Netherlands	6	5	0	1	169	147	+22	10	Qualification stage 2
2	Belgium	6	3	1	2	168	159	+9	7 (Note: Belgium 54–48 Turkey)	
3	Turkey	6	3	1	2	146	149	−3	7	
4	Greece	6	0	0	6	137	165	−28	0	

Source: Eurohandball
Rules for classification: 1) points; 2) head-to-head points; 3) head-to-head goal difference; 4) head-to-head number of goals scored; 5) goal difference.
Notes:

25 October 2017; 18:00	Turkey	27–27	Belgium	Porsuk Spor Salonu, Eskişehir; Attendance: 2,350; Referees: Baranowski, Lemanowicz (POL)
25 October 2017; 18:00	Çelebi 7	(12–18)	D. Kedziora 13	Porsuk Spor Salonu, Eskişehir; Attendance: 2,350; Referees: Baranowski, Lemanowicz (POL)
25 October 2017; 18:00	3× (yellow card) 6× (suspension)	Report	3× (yellow card) 4× (suspension)	Porsuk Spor Salonu, Eskişehir; Attendance: 2,350; Referees: Baranowski, Lemanowicz (POL)

25 October 2017; 19:30	Netherlands	29–20	Greece	Topsportcentrum Rotterdam, Rotterdam; Attendance: 1,100; Referees: Kjær, Pedersen (DEN)
25 October 2017; 19:30	Schagen 12	(15–12)	Papadopoulos 8	Topsportcentrum Rotterdam, Rotterdam; Attendance: 1,100; Referees: Kjær, Pedersen (DEN)
25 October 2017; 19:30	3× (yellow card) 5× (suspension) 1× (red card)	Report	2× (yellow card) 2× (suspension)	Topsportcentrum Rotterdam, Rotterdam; Attendance: 1,100; Referees: Kjær, Pedersen (DEN)

29 October 2017; 16:20	Belgium	25–26	Netherlands	Sportoase Leuven, Leuven; Attendance: 2,050; Referees: Baumgart, Wild (GER)
29 October 2017; 16:20	Cauwenberghs 6	(12–14)	Schagen 7	Sportoase Leuven, Leuven; Attendance: 2,050; Referees: Baumgart, Wild (GER)
29 October 2017; 16:20	3× (yellow card) 2× (suspension)	Report	3× (yellow card) 2× (suspension)	Sportoase Leuven, Leuven; Attendance: 2,050; Referees: Baumgart, Wild (GER)

29 October 2017; 19:00	Greece	19–25	Turkey	Kassimatis Olympic Indoor Hall, Marousi; Attendance: 870; Referees: Mitrović, Vešović (MNE)
29 October 2017; 19:00	Mallios 8	(8–14)	Döne 7	Kassimatis Olympic Indoor Hall, Marousi; Attendance: 870; Referees: Mitrović, Vešović (MNE)
29 October 2017; 19:00	3× (yellow card) 2× (suspension)	Report	3× (yellow card) 4× (suspension) 2× (red card)	Kassimatis Olympic Indoor Hall, Marousi; Attendance: 870; Referees: Mitrović, Vešović (MNE)

4 January 2018; 18:00	Turkey	30–27	Netherlands	Hasan Dağı Spor Salonu, Aksaray; Attendance: 2,500; Referees: Andorka, Hucker (HUN)
4 January 2018; 18:00	Döne 11	(14–16)	Schagen, Steins 5	Hasan Dağı Spor Salonu, Aksaray; Attendance: 2,500; Referees: Andorka, Hucker (HUN)
4 January 2018; 18:00	2× (yellow card) 5× (suspension)	Report	3× (yellow card) 5× (suspension)	Hasan Dağı Spor Salonu, Aksaray; Attendance: 2,500; Referees: Andorka, Hucker (HUN)

4 January 2018; 20:00	Belgium	33–28	Greece	Sportoase Leuven, Leuven; Attendance: 1,100; Referees: Manea, Iliescu (ROU)
4 January 2018; 20:00	Kedziora 8	(20–16)	Mallios 5	Sportoase Leuven, Leuven; Attendance: 1,100; Referees: Manea, Iliescu (ROU)
4 January 2018; 20:00	3× (yellow card) 1× (suspension)	Report	3× (yellow card) 4× (suspension)	Sportoase Leuven, Leuven; Attendance: 1,100; Referees: Manea, Iliescu (ROU)

7 January 2018; 13:00	Netherlands	26–19	Turkey	Fitland XL, Sittard; Attendance: 1,025; Referees: Kiyashko, Kiselev (RUS)
7 January 2018; 13:00	Smits 6	(12–12)	Biçer, Pehlivan 4	Fitland XL, Sittard; Attendance: 1,025; Referees: Kiyashko, Kiselev (RUS)
7 January 2018; 13:00	2× (yellow card)	Report	3× (yellow card) 2× (suspension)	Fitland XL, Sittard; Attendance: 1,025; Referees: Kiyashko, Kiselev (RUS)

7 January 2018; 17:00	Greece	24–26	Belgium	Mikra 3, Thessaloniki; Attendance: 800; Referees: Čerņavskis, Bogdanovs (LAT)
7 January 2018; 17:00	Mallios 8	(14–9)	Kedziora 5	Mikra 3, Thessaloniki; Attendance: 800; Referees: Čerņavskis, Bogdanovs (LAT)
7 January 2018; 17:00	3× (yellow card) 2× (suspension)	Report	2× (yellow card) 7× (suspension)	Mikra 3, Thessaloniki; Attendance: 800; Referees: Čerņavskis, Bogdanovs (LAT)

10 January 2018; 20:00	Belgium	27–21	Turkey	Sportoase Leuven, Leuven; Attendance: 960; Referees: Bounouara, Sami (FRA)
10 January 2018; 20:00	Cauwenberghs, Kedziora 8	(12–12)	Çelebi 4	Sportoase Leuven, Leuven; Attendance: 960; Referees: Bounouara, Sami (FRA)
10 January 2018; 20:00	3× (yellow card) 3× (suspension)	Report	3× (yellow card) 3× (suspension)	Sportoase Leuven, Leuven; Attendance: 960; Referees: Bounouara, Sami (FRA)

11 January 2018; 19:00	Greece	23–28	Netherlands	Mikra 3, Thessaloniki; Attendance: 500; Referees: Nabokau, Kulik (BLR)
11 January 2018; 19:00	Tziras 11	(14–15)	Schagen 6	Mikra 3, Thessaloniki; Attendance: 500; Referees: Nabokau, Kulik (BLR)
11 January 2018; 19:00	2× (yellow card) 4× (suspension)	Report	2× (yellow card) 3× (suspension) 1× (red card)	Mikra 3, Thessaloniki; Attendance: 500; Referees: Nabokau, Kulik (BLR)

14 January 2018; 13:00	Netherlands	33–30	Belgium	Fitland XL, Sittard; Attendance: 1,800; Referees: Hájek, Macho (CZE)
14 January 2018; 13:00	Schagen 6	(17–14)	Cauwenberghs 9	Fitland XL, Sittard; Attendance: 1,800; Referees: Hájek, Macho (CZE)
14 January 2018; 13:00	3× (yellow card) 7× (suspension)	Report	3× (yellow card) 4× (suspension)	Fitland XL, Sittard; Attendance: 1,800; Referees: Hájek, Macho (CZE)

14 January 2018; 15:00	Turkey	24–23	Greece	Hasan Dağı Spor Salonu, Aksaray; Attendance: 2,500; Referees: Konjičanin, Konjičanin (BIH)
14 January 2018; 15:00	Döne 6	(13–12)	Kostakidis 7	Hasan Dağı Spor Salonu, Aksaray; Attendance: 2,500; Referees: Konjičanin, Konjičanin (BIH)
14 January 2018; 15:00	3× (yellow card) 2× (suspension)	Report	3× (yellow card) 3× (suspension)	Hasan Dağı Spor Salonu, Aksaray; Attendance: 2,500; Referees: Konjičanin, Konjičanin (BIH)

=== Group 6 ===
Pos	Team	Pld	W	D	L	GF	GA	GD	Pts	Qualification
1	Switzerland	4	3	0	1	96	67	+29	6	Qualification stage 2
2	Bosnia and Herzegovina	4	2	0	2	80	84	−4	4	
3	Estonia	4	1	0	3	96	121	−25	2	

Source: Eurohandball
Rules for classification: 1) points; 2) head-to-head points; 3) head-to-head goal difference; 4) head-to-head number of goals scored; 5) Goal difference.

25 October 2017; 20:00	Bosnia and Herzegovina	31–24	Estonia	Mirza Delibašić Hall, Sarajevo; Attendance: 2,500; Referees: Budzák, Záhradník (SVK)
25 October 2017; 20:00	Vranješ 8	(18–10)	Johannson 5	Mirza Delibašić Hall, Sarajevo; Attendance: 2,500; Referees: Budzák, Záhradník (SVK)
25 October 2017; 20:00	3× (yellow card) 2× (suspension)	Report	3× (yellow card) 3× (suspension)	Mirza Delibašić Hall, Sarajevo; Attendance: 2,500; Referees: Budzák, Záhradník (SVK)

28 October 2017; 19:30	Estonia	29–25	Bosnia and Herzegovina	Kalev Sports Hall, Tallinn; Attendance: 600; Referees: Jørum, Kleven (NOR)
28 October 2017; 19:30	Rooba 8	(17–11)	Karačić, Vranješ 5	Kalev Sports Hall, Tallinn; Attendance: 600; Referees: Jørum, Kleven (NOR)
28 October 2017; 19:30	2× (yellow card) 3× (suspension)	Report	1× (yellow card) 2× (suspension)	Kalev Sports Hall, Tallinn; Attendance: 600; Referees: Jørum, Kleven (NOR)

3 January 2018; 19:30	Estonia	22–26	Switzerland	Kalev Sports Hall, Tallinn; Attendance: 1,200; Referees: Madsen, Mortensen (DEN)
3 January 2018; 19:30	Jaanimaa 5	(11–14)	three players 5	Kalev Sports Hall, Tallinn; Attendance: 1,200; Referees: Madsen, Mortensen (DEN)
3 January 2018; 19:30	1× (yellow card) 4× (suspension) 1× (red card)	Report	3× (yellow card) 4× (suspension)	Kalev Sports Hall, Tallinn; Attendance: 1,200; Referees: Madsen, Mortensen (DEN)

7 January 2018; 16:45	Switzerland	39–21	Estonia	Eulachhalle, Winterthur; Attendance: 2,078; Referees: Bolic, Hurich (AUT)
7 January 2018; 16:45	Gerbl 7	(19–10)	Voika 5	Eulachhalle, Winterthur; Attendance: 2,078; Referees: Bolic, Hurich (AUT)
7 January 2018; 16:45	2× (yellow card) 2× (suspension)	Report	2× (yellow card) 6× (suspension)	Eulachhalle, Winterthur; Attendance: 2,078; Referees: Bolic, Hurich (AUT)

10 January 2018; 18:30	Switzerland	21–24	Bosnia and Herzegovina	Sporthalle Kreuzbleiche, St. Gallen; Attendance: 2,561; Referees: Leandersson, Lindroos (FIN)
10 January 2018; 18:30	Meister 6	(12–12)	Vegar 6	Sporthalle Kreuzbleiche, St. Gallen; Attendance: 2,561; Referees: Leandersson, Lindroos (FIN)
10 January 2018; 18:30	3× (yellow card) 2× (suspension)	Report	2× (yellow card) 5× (suspension)	Sporthalle Kreuzbleiche, St. Gallen; Attendance: 2,561; Referees: Leandersson, Lindroos (FIN)

13 January 2018; 20:00	Bosnia and Herzegovina	0–10 (awarded)	Switzerland	KSPC Mejdan, Tuzla; Referees: Herczeg, Südi (HUN)
13 January 2018; 20:00		Report		KSPC Mejdan, Tuzla; Referees: Herczeg, Südi (HUN)

- Bosnia Herzegovina won the game 21–15, but an ineligible player took part in the match. Switzerland launched a protest after the game. The EHF accepted the protest and the result of the match was awarded 10–0 in favour of Switzerland.

== Qualification stage 2 ==
The draw took place on 27 January at 16:00 in Zagreb, Croatia. All stage 1 winners and three worst placed teams from European Championship were unseeded at the draw.

=== Draw ===
Pot 1 (seeded)	Pot 2 (unseeded)
Belarus; Croatia; Czech Republic; Iceland; Macedonia; Norway; Serbia; Slovenia; Sweden	Austria; Hungary; Lithuania; Montenegro; Netherlands; Portugal; Romania; Russia; Switzerland

Notes

1. ^{‡} Winners of the Qualification stage 1

=== Overview ===
The first legs were played on 8 to 10 June and the second legs on 12 to 14 June 2018.

Team 1	Agg.	Team 2	1st leg	2nd leg
Serbia	53–46	Portugal	28–21	25–25
Lithuania	58–61	Iceland	27–27	31–34
Czech Republic	48–55	Russia	27–26	21–29
Slovenia	50–51	Hungary	24–29	26–22
Belarus	54–59	Austria	28–28	26–31
Macedonia	57–50	Romania	32–24	25–26
Netherlands	45–50	Sweden	25–24	20–26
Norway	62–59	Switzerland	32–26	30–33
Croatia	63–51	Montenegro	32–19	31–32

=== Matches ===
10 June 2018; 18:00	Serbia	28–21	Portugal	Čair Sports Center, Niš; Attendance: 3,500; Referees: Zotin, Volodkov (RUS)
10 June 2018; 18:00	N.Ilić 6	(14–10)	Portela 5	Čair Sports Center, Niš; Attendance: 3,500; Referees: Zotin, Volodkov (RUS)
10 June 2018; 18:00	2× (yellow card) 2× (suspension)	Report	4× (yellow card) 2× (suspension)	Čair Sports Center, Niš; Attendance: 3,500; Referees: Zotin, Volodkov (RUS)

14 June 2018; 21:00	Portugal	25–25	Serbia	Pavilhão Desportivo Municipal da Póvoa de Varzim, Póvoa de Varzim; Attendance: 2,500; Referees: Erdoğan, Özdeniz (TUR)
14 June 2018; 21:00	Portela 5	(13–10)	Radivojević 6	Pavilhão Desportivo Municipal da Póvoa de Varzim, Póvoa de Varzim; Attendance: 2,500; Referees: Erdoğan, Özdeniz (TUR)
14 June 2018; 21:00	2× (yellow card) 4× (suspension)	Report	4× (yellow card) 6× (suspension)	Pavilhão Desportivo Municipal da Póvoa de Varzim, Póvoa de Varzim; Attendance: 2,500; Referees: Erdoğan, Özdeniz (TUR)

Serbia won 53–46 on aggregate.

8 June 2018; 19:00	Lithuania	27–27	Iceland	Siemens Arena, Vilnius; Attendance: 2,700; Referees: Santos, Fonseca (POR)
8 June 2018; 19:00	Malašinskas 7	(10–13)	Gunnarsson 7	Siemens Arena, Vilnius; Attendance: 2,700; Referees: Santos, Fonseca (POR)
8 June 2018; 19:00	3× (yellow card) 3× (suspension)	Report	2× (yellow card) 6× (suspension) 1× (red card)	Siemens Arena, Vilnius; Attendance: 2,700; Referees: Santos, Fonseca (POR)

13 June 2018; 19:00	Iceland	34–31	Lithuania	Laugardalshöll, Reykjavík; Attendance: 2,500; Referees: Baďura, Ondogrecula (SVK)
13 June 2018; 19:00	Sigurðsson 10	(18–16)	Malašinskas 8	Laugardalshöll, Reykjavík; Attendance: 2,500; Referees: Baďura, Ondogrecula (SVK)
13 June 2018; 19:00	2× (yellow card) 3× (suspension) 1× (red card)	Report	3× (yellow card) 5× (suspension)	Laugardalshöll, Reykjavík; Attendance: 2,500; Referees: Baďura, Ondogrecula (SVK)

Iceland won 61–58 on aggregate.

8 June 2018; 20:00	Czech Republic	27–26	Russia	Městská sportovní hala, Plzeň; Attendance: 1,200; Referees: Jurinović, Mrvica (CRO)
8 June 2018; 20:00	Babák, Hrstka 6	(12–17)	Shishkaryov 5	Městská sportovní hala, Plzeň; Attendance: 1,200; Referees: Jurinović, Mrvica (CRO)
8 June 2018; 20:00	2× (yellow card) 2× (suspension)	Report	3× (yellow card)	Městská sportovní hala, Plzeň; Attendance: 1,200; Referees: Jurinović, Mrvica (CRO)

12 June 2018; 16:00	Russia	29–21	Czech Republic	SC V.P. Sukhareva, Perm; Attendance: 2,000; Referees: Pavićević, Raznatović (MNE)
12 June 2018; 16:00	Zhitnikov 8	(14–11)	Jurka 7	SC V.P. Sukhareva, Perm; Attendance: 2,000; Referees: Pavićević, Raznatović (MNE)
12 June 2018; 16:00	3× (yellow card) 3× (suspension)	Report	2× (yellow card) 4× (suspension)	SC V.P. Sukhareva, Perm; Attendance: 2,000; Referees: Pavićević, Raznatović (MNE)

Russia won 55–48 on aggregate.

9 June 2018; 20:00	Slovenia	24–29	Hungary	Športna Dvorana Bonifika, Koper; Attendance: 3,050; Referees: Gjeding, Hansen (DEN)
9 June 2018; 20:00	Kavtičnik 7	(14–13)	three players 6	Športna Dvorana Bonifika, Koper; Attendance: 3,050; Referees: Gjeding, Hansen (DEN)
9 June 2018; 20:00	2× (yellow card) 8× (suspension)	Report	1× (yellow card) 12× (suspension) 2× (red card)	Športna Dvorana Bonifika, Koper; Attendance: 3,050; Referees: Gjeding, Hansen (DEN)

13 June 2018; 18:00	Hungary	22–26	Slovenia	Veszprém Aréna, Veszprém; Attendance: 5,019; Referees: Badura, Ondogrecula (SVK)
13 June 2018; 18:00	Lékai 7	(12–12)	Mačkovšek 6	Veszprém Aréna, Veszprém; Attendance: 5,019; Referees: Badura, Ondogrecula (SVK)
13 June 2018; 18:00	1× (yellow card) 2× (suspension)	Report	3× (yellow card) 4× (suspension)	Veszprém Aréna, Veszprém; Attendance: 5,019; Referees: Badura, Ondogrecula (SVK)

Hungary won 51–50 on aggregate.

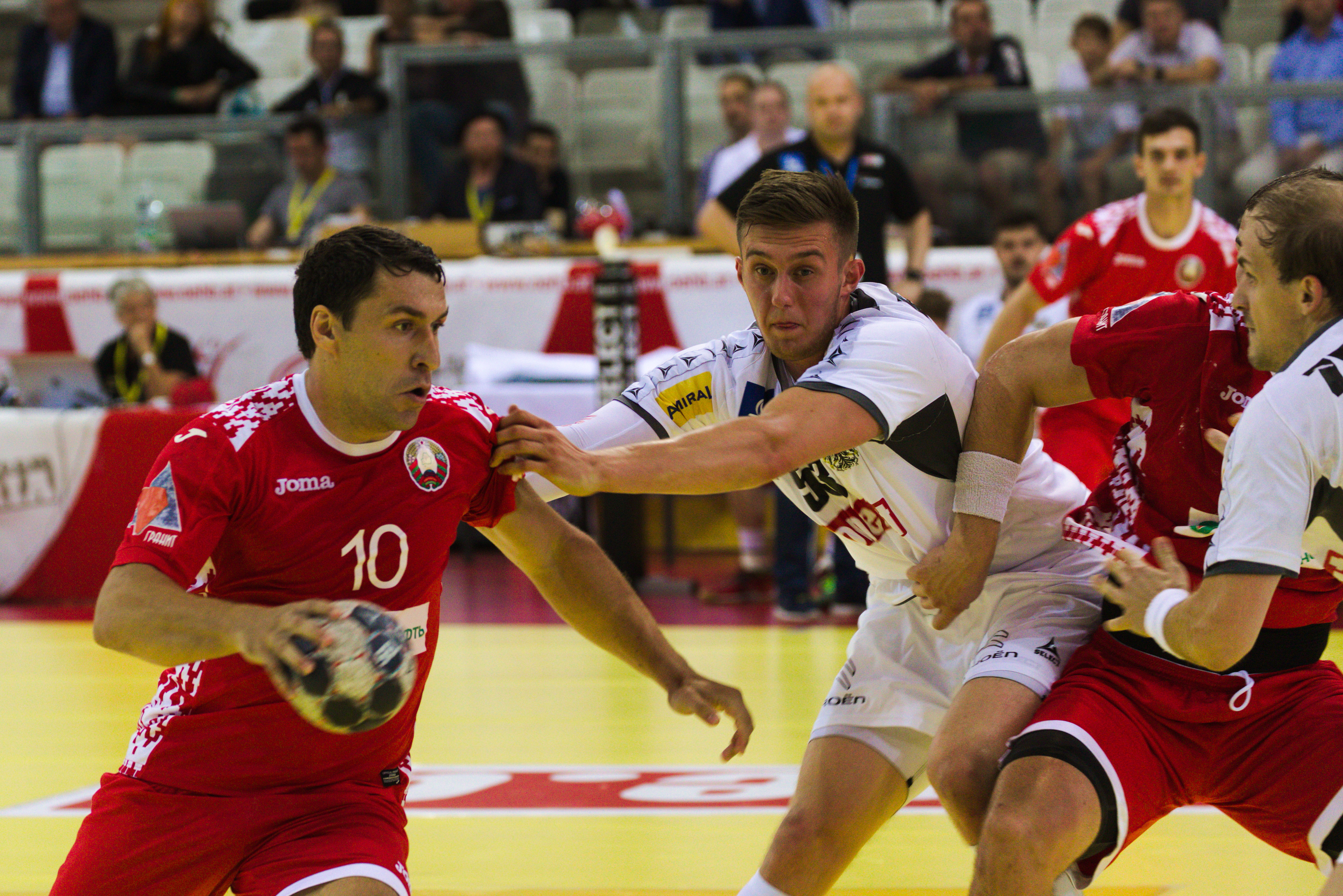
Belarus on the attack in their return leg in Vienna

10 June 2018; 17:00	Belarus	28–28	Austria	Sports Palace Uruchje, Minsk; Attendance: 2,500; Referees: Baranowski, Lemanowicz (POL)
10 June 2018; 17:00	Pukhouski 7	(15–15)	Bilyk 7	Sports Palace Uruchje, Minsk; Attendance: 2,500; Referees: Baranowski, Lemanowicz (POL)
10 June 2018; 17:00	3× (yellow card) 5× (suspension)	Report	3× (yellow card) 6× (suspension)	Sports Palace Uruchje, Minsk; Attendance: 2,500; Referees: Baranowski, Lemanowicz (POL)

13 June 2018; 18:10	Austria	31–26	Belarus	Albert Schultz Eishalle, Vienna; Attendance: 5,000; Referees: Sondors, Līcis (LAT)
13 June 2018; 18:10	Hermann 6	(13–16)	Pukhouski 5	Albert Schultz Eishalle, Vienna; Attendance: 5,000; Referees: Sondors, Līcis (LAT)
13 June 2018; 18:10	2× (yellow card) 3× (suspension)	Report	1× (yellow card) 3× (suspension)	Albert Schultz Eishalle, Vienna; Attendance: 5,000; Referees: Sondors, Līcis (LAT)

Austria won 59–54 on aggregate.

10 June 2018; 20:30	Macedonia	32–24	Romania	Boris Trajkovski Sports Center, Skopje; Attendance: 6,200; Referees: Mažeika, Gatelis (LTU)
10 June 2018; 20:30	K.Lazarov 8	(15–10)	Racoțea 6	Boris Trajkovski Sports Center, Skopje; Attendance: 6,200; Referees: Mažeika, Gatelis (LTU)
10 June 2018; 20:30	4× (yellow card) 4× (suspension)	Report	3× (yellow card) 6× (suspension)	Boris Trajkovski Sports Center, Skopje; Attendance: 6,200; Referees: Mažeika, Gatelis (LTU)

13 June 2018; 18:30	Romania	26–25	Macedonia	Horia Demian Sports Hall, Cluj-Napoca; Attendance: 2,500; Referees: Geipel, Helbig (GER)
13 June 2018; 18:30	Grigoraș 8	(12–11)	Manaskov 8	Horia Demian Sports Hall, Cluj-Napoca; Attendance: 2,500; Referees: Geipel, Helbig (GER)
13 June 2018; 18:30	2× (yellow card) 3× (suspension)	Report	2× (yellow card)	Horia Demian Sports Hall, Cluj-Napoca; Attendance: 2,500; Referees: Geipel, Helbig (GER)

Macedonia won 57–50 on aggregate.

9 June 2018; 16:00	Netherlands	25–24	Sweden	Maaspoort Sports & Events, 's-Hertogenbosch; Attendance: 1,250; Referees: Horváth, Marton (HUN)
9 June 2018; 16:00	Sluijters 5	(13–12)	Lagergren 6	Maaspoort Sports & Events, 's-Hertogenbosch; Attendance: 1,250; Referees: Horváth, Marton (HUN)
9 June 2018; 16:00	3× (yellow card) 2× (suspension)	Report	2× (yellow card) 3× (suspension)	Maaspoort Sports & Events, 's-Hertogenbosch; Attendance: 1,250; Referees: Horváth, Marton (HUN)

13 June 2018; 15:00	Sweden	26–20	Netherlands	Kristianstad Arena, Kristianstad; Attendance: 4,360; Referees: Brunner, Salah (SUI)
13 June 2018; 15:00	Tollbring, Zachrisson 7	(14–7)	Smits 8	Kristianstad Arena, Kristianstad; Attendance: 4,360; Referees: Brunner, Salah (SUI)
13 June 2018; 15:00	2× (yellow card) 3× (suspension)	Report	2× (yellow card) 5× (suspension)	Kristianstad Arena, Kristianstad; Attendance: 4,360; Referees: Brunner, Salah (SUI)

Sweden won 50–45 on aggregate.

9 June 2018; 19:15	Norway	32–26	Switzerland	DNB Arena, Stavanger; Attendance: 4,200; Referees: Pichon, Reveret (FRA)
9 June 2018; 19:15	Sagosen 10	(19–11)	Gerbl, Schmid 6	DNB Arena, Stavanger; Attendance: 4,200; Referees: Pichon, Reveret (FRA)
9 June 2018; 19:15	2× (yellow card) 5× (suspension)	Report	2× (yellow card) 5× (suspension)	DNB Arena, Stavanger; Attendance: 4,200; Referees: Pichon, Reveret (FRA)

12 June 2018; 18:15	Switzerland	33–30	Norway	Bossard Arena, Zug; Attendance: 3,450; Referees: Nikolov, Nachevski (MKD)
12 June 2018; 18:15	Schmid 12	(15–16)	Sagosen 11	Bossard Arena, Zug; Attendance: 3,450; Referees: Nikolov, Nachevski (MKD)
12 June 2018; 18:15	3× (yellow card) 3× (suspension)	Report	3× (yellow card) 6× (suspension)	Bossard Arena, Zug; Attendance: 3,450; Referees: Nikolov, Nachevski (MKD)

Norway won 62–59 on aggregate.

9 June 2018; 20:00	Croatia	32–19	Montenegro	Gradski vrt Hall, Osijek; Attendance: 4,500; Referees: Brunovský, Čanda (SVK)
9 June 2018; 20:00	Horvat, Štrlek 6	(17–10)	Grbović 4	Gradski vrt Hall, Osijek; Attendance: 4,500; Referees: Brunovský, Čanda (SVK)
9 June 2018; 20:00	2× (yellow card) 4× (suspension)	Report	2× (yellow card) 3× (suspension)	Gradski vrt Hall, Osijek; Attendance: 4,500; Referees: Brunovský, Čanda (SVK)

14 June 2018; 20:00	Montenegro	32–31	Croatia	Morača Sports Center, Podgorica; Attendance: 1,100; Referees: López, Ramírez (ESP)
14 June 2018; 20:00	Vujović 9	(18–14)	Horvat 7	Morača Sports Center, Podgorica; Attendance: 1,100; Referees: López, Ramírez (ESP)
14 June 2018; 20:00	2× (yellow card) 3× (suspension)	Report	2× (yellow card) 3× (suspension)	Morača Sports Center, Podgorica; Attendance: 1,100; Referees: López, Ramírez (ESP)

Croatia won 63–51 on aggregate.
