= Armi Pärt =

Estonian handball player (born 1991)

Personal information
- Nationality: Estonian
- Born: 18 June 1991 (age 35) Tallinn, Estonia
- Height: 2.05 m (6 ft 9 in)

Sport
- Sport: Handball
- Position: Pivot
- Current club: HK Varberg
- Number: 50

Senior clubs
- Years: Team
- 2008–2013: HC Kehra
- 2013–2014: Besiktas
- 2014–2015: Rækker Mølle
- 2015-2016: CB Villa de Aranda
- 2016-2017: Massy Essonne Handball
- 2017-2019: Mecklenburger Stiere Schwerin
- 2019-2020: HIF Karlskrona
- 2021: HK Varberg
National team
Years	Team	Apps	(Gls)
2012–2024	Estonia	60	(78)

Armi Pärt (born 18 June 1991) is an Estonian handballer, playing in French D2 for Massy Essonne Handball. He is also a member of Estonian national team.

== Club career ==
=== HC Kehra ===
Armi Pärt started his handball career in HC Kehra. Club what is located in the small town of Kehra (population only 3060 people) gave him an opportunity to play for the first team when Pärt was 17. In his first season they made "the double" in Estonia as winning both- the league and the Cup.

With Pärt on the line, HC Kehra won the league again in 2012 and cup in 2011. In Baltic League where are top clubs from Estonia, Latvia, Lithuania, Belarus and Finland, HC Kehra and Armi Pärt won the league in a row in 2011 and 2012. In the summer of 2013 Armi signed a one-year contract with Turkish Champions.

=== Besiktas J.K. ===
Pärt moved to Besiktas for the 2013–2014 season from HC Kehra and made his debut for the new club in "The Annual Doboj International Champions Handball Tournament". Next step was EHF Champions League Qualification tournament against HT Tatran Prešov and A.E.K Athens. Despite good game and goals against Prešov and AEK, Pärt and Besiktas lost both of the games and went to play EHF Cup 2 round.

Second round draw gave Besiktas chance to play against Switzerland club Pfadi Winterthur. Draw from the first game was a waking clock for the Turkish and Istanbul club won the second game with three goals and moved forward to the 3rd round. Last opponent in Besiktas Europe adventure was Hungarian Csurgói KK, who won a two-game fight with 9 goals.

In Turkish Handball Super League regular season, Besiktas showed really good form and won 24 games out of 26. One game ended with a draw and one Besiktas lost. Armi Pärt scored 52 goals from 26 games. In play-offs Besiktas great form continued and they won in final Ankara İl Özel İdare SK with games 3:0. That victory was Besiktas sixth in a row and overall tenth. With play-offs Armi finished his season scoring 60 goals.

Besiktas and Pärt also won Turkish Handball Cup. In the final they won 33:27 Nilüfer Belediyespor

=== Rækker Mølle ===
In the beginning of August 2014 the strong Estonian Pivot signed a contract with Danish first division club Rækker Mølle. By his own words, he was looking for new experience in his career and chance to develop in different handball environment.

=== CB Villa de Aranda ===
After a season in Denmark, Pärt moved to Liga ASOBAL. He signed a three-year contract with Spanish side CB Villa de Aranda. He made his debut for the club in a league game against CB Cangas on 5 September 2015. He scored his first goal for the club against SD Teucro on 31 October 2015. For CB Villa de Aranda Pärt played in 29 games, scored 14 goals, received 11 yellow cards and was sent off for 2 minute penalty for 16 times.

=== Massy Essonne Handball ===
At the end of the season in Spain, Pärt was approached by France Pro D2 division club Massy Essonne Handball with whom he signed a one-year deal.

=== Mecklenburger Stiere Schwerin ===
Since summer of 2017, Pärt plays for the team of Mecklenburger Stiere Schwerin in the Northern division of Germany's third league. The Stiere place third place in February after about half the season.

== International career ==
Pärt is a member of Estonian national team and he made his debut on 31 October 2012 against Ireland.

== Honours ==
- HC Kehra
  - Estonian League : 2008–09 and 2011–12
    - Runners Up: 2010–11, 2012–13
  - Baltic League: 2011 and 2012
  - Estonian Handball Cup : 2008 and 2011
    - Runners Up: 2009
- Besiktas
  - Turkish Super League regular season: 2013–14
  - Turkish Handball Super League: 2013–14
  - Turkish Handball Cup: 2013–14
