= Estonia men's national handball team =

Estonia

Information
- Association: Estonian Handball Association
- Coach: Rein Suvi

Colours
1st	2nd
- Last updated on Unknown.

Estonia men's national handball team
Medal record

Challenge Trophy
Silver medal – second place	2001 Riga	

The Estonia national handball team (Estonian: Eesti käsipallikoondis) is controlled by the Estonian Handball Association (Eesti Käsipalliliit) and represents Estonia in international handball competitions.

== Honours ==
Challenge Trophy
- Runners-up: 2001

== Competitive record ==
=== Olympic Games ===
Games	Round	Position	Pld	W	D	L	GF	GA	GD
(Germany) 1936 Berlin	Did not qualify								
(West Germany) 1972 Munich	Did not qualify								
(Canada) 1976 Montreal	Did not qualify								
(Soviet Union) 1980 Moscow	Did not qualify								
(United States) 1984 Los Angeles	Did not qualify								
(South Korea) 1988 Seoul	Did not qualify								
(Spain) 1992 Barcelona	Did not qualify								
(United States) 1996 Atlanta	Did not qualify								
(Australia) 2000 Sydney	Did not qualify								
(Greece) 2004 Athens	Did not qualify								
(China) 2008 Beijing	Did not qualify								
(United Kingdom) 2012 London	Did not qualify								
(Brazil) 2016 Rio de Janeiro	Did not qualify								
(Japan) 2020 Tokyo	Did not qualify								
(France) 2024 Paris	To be determined								
(United States) 2028 Los Angeles	To be determined								
(Australia) 2032 Brisbane	To be determined								
Total	0/16	0	0	0	0	0	0	0	0

=== World Championship ===
Year	Round	Position	GP	W	D	L	GS	GA
(Germany) 1938	Did not qualify							
(Sweden) 1954	Did not qualify							
(East Germany) 1958	Did not qualify							
(West Germany) 1961	Did not qualify							
(Czechoslovakia) 1964	Did not qualify							
(Sweden) 1967	Did not qualify							
(France) 1970	Did not qualify							
(East Germany) 1974	Did not qualify							
(Denmark) 1978	Did not qualify							
(West Germany) 1982	Did not qualify							
(Switzerland) 1986	Did not qualify							
(Czechoslovakia) 1990	Did not qualify							
(Sweden) 1993	Did not qualify							
(Iceland) 1995	Did not qualify							
(Japan) 1997	Did not qualify							
(Egypt) 1999	Did not qualify							
(France) 2001	Did not qualify							
(Portugal) 2003	Did not qualify							
(Tunisia) 2005	Did not qualify							
(Germany) 2007	Did not qualify							
(Croatia) 2009	Did not qualify							
(Sweden) 2011	Did not qualify							
(Spain) 2013	Did not qualify							
(Qatar) 2015	Did not qualify							
(France) 2017	Did not qualify							
(Denmark) / (Germany) 2019	Did not qualify							
(Egypt) 2021	Did not qualify							
(Poland) / (Sweden) 2023	Did not qualify							
(Croatia) / (Denmark) / (Norway) 2025	Did not qualify							
(Germany) 2027	To be determined							
(France) (Germany) 2029	To be determined							
(Denmark) (Iceland) (Norway) 2031	To be determined							
Total	0/32	0	0	0	0	0	0	0

=== European Championship ===
Year	Round	Position	GP	W	D	L	GS	GA
(Portugal) 1994	Did not qualify							
(Spain) 1996	Did not qualify							
(Italy) 1998	Did not qualify							
(Croatia) 2000	Did not qualify							
(Sweden) 2002	Did not qualify							
(Slovenia) 2004	Did not qualify							
(Switzerland) 2006	Did not qualify							
(Norway) 2008	Did not qualify							
(Austria) 2010	Did not qualify							
(Serbia) 2012	Did not qualify							
(Denmark) 2014	Did not qualify							
(Poland) 2016	Did not qualify							
(Croatia) 2018	Did not qualify							
(Austria) / (Norway) / (Sweden) 2020	Did not qualify							
(Hungary) / (Slovakia) 2022	Did not qualify							
(Germany) 2024	Did not qualify							
(Denmark) / (Norway) / (Sweden) 2026	Did not qualify							
(Portugal) / (Spain) / (Switzerland) 2028	To be determined							
Total	0/18	0	0	0	0	0	0	0

=== Emerging Nations Championship ===
- 2015 – 5th place

== Team ==
=== Current squad ===
Squad for the 2019 World Men's Handball Championship qualification.

Head coach: Rein Suvi

No.	Pos.	Name	Date of birth (age)	Height	App.	Goals	Club
2	LB	Mikk Pinnonen	4 January 1991 (age 35)	1.80 m			(Iceland) Afturelding
5	RW	Kristjan Muuga	16 September 1984 (age 42)	1.78 m			(Estonia) Põlva Serviti
7	RB	Dener Jaanimaa	9 August 1989 (age 37)	1.85 m			(Germany) MT Melsungen
9	LB	Mait Patrail	11 April 1988 (age 38)	2.00 m			(Germany) TSV Hannover-Burgdorf
11	P	Martin Johannson	2 July 1985 (age 41)	1.95 m			(Romania) CSA Steaua București
12	GK	Eston Varusk	25 March 1984 (age 42)	1.87 m			(Estonia) Põlva Serviti
13	LW	Henri Sillaste	15 July 1988 (age 38)	1.75 m			(Estonia) Põlva Serviti
18	RB	Andris Celminš	4 July 1996 (age 30)	1.91 m			(Slovenia) Maribor Branik
19	LB	Karl Toom	23 June 1997 (age 29)	1.95 m			(Germany) TV 1893 Neuhausen
28	LB	Henri Hiiend	22 January 1995 (age 31)	1.88 m			(Estonia) Põlva Serviti
32	RW	Karl Roosna	2 April 1997 (age 29)	1.83 m			(Germany) TUSEM Essen
40	RW	Jürgen Rooba	18 December 1989 (age 36)	1.76 m			(Sweden) Amo HK
43	LW	Kaspar Lees	13 June 1990 (age 36)	1.84 m			(Estonia) HC Kehra
47	RB	Kristo Voika	22 November 1990 (age 35)	1.83 m			(Turkey) Serik Belediyesi
50	P	Armi Pärt	18 June 1991 (age 35)	2.00 m			(Germany) Mecklenburger Stiere Schwerin
60	P	Hendrik Varul	12 December 1995 (age 30)	1.94 m			(Estonia) Põlva Serviti
92	GK	Rasmus Ots	28 July 1992 (age 34)	1.90 m			(Estonia) Viljandi HC

== Notable players ==
- Dener Jaanimaa
- Kaupo Palmar
- Mait Patrail
