= Mait Patrail =

Estonian handball player

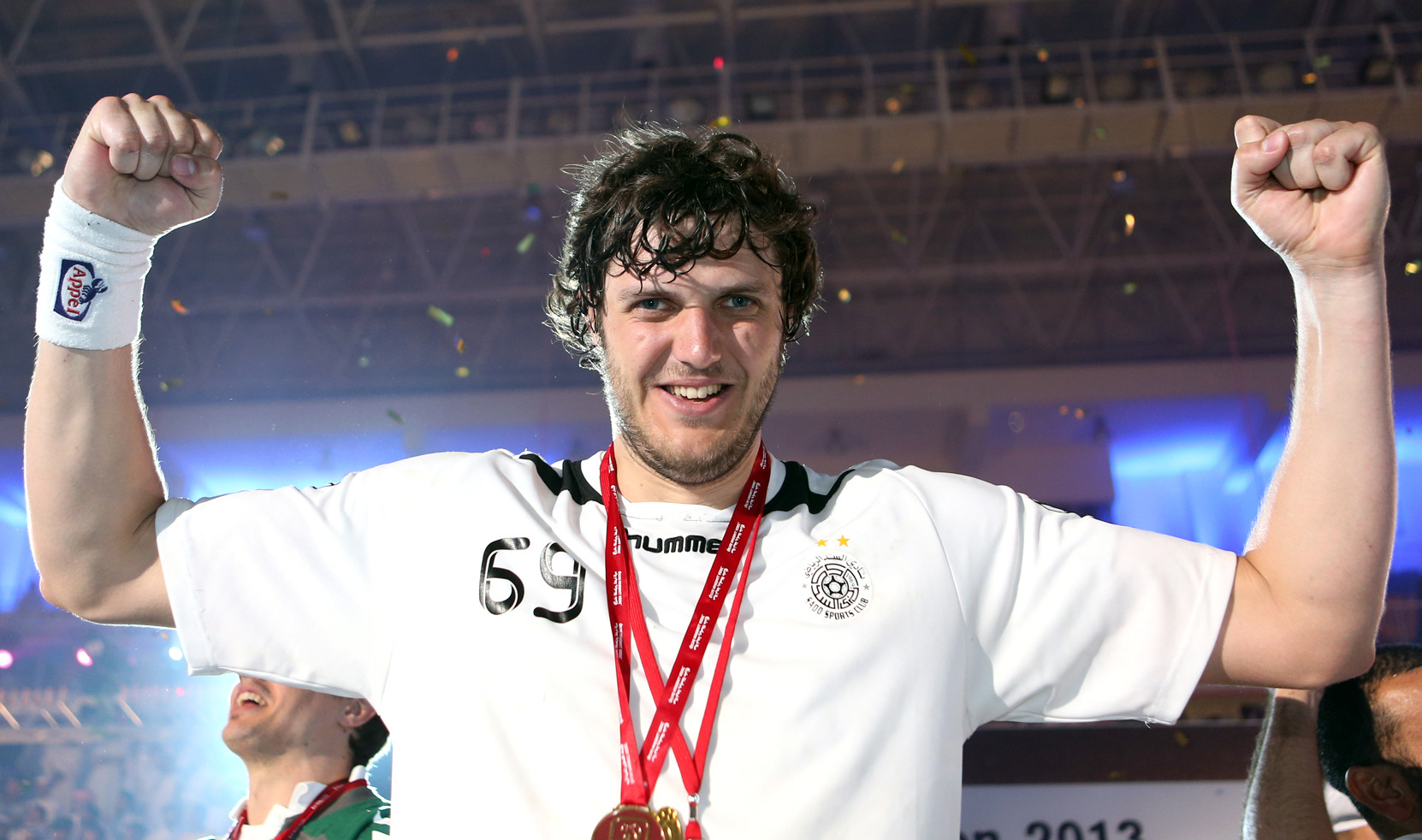
- Patrail with Al Sadd in 2013

Personal information
- Nationality: Estonian
- Born: 11 April 1988 (age 38) Põlva, Estonia
- Height: 2.00 m (6 ft 7 in)

Sport
- Sport: Handball
- Position: Left back
- Current club: TV Emsdetten
- Number: 9

Senior clubs
- Years: Team
- 2004–2008: Põlva Serviti
- 2008–2011: Kadetten Schaffhausen
- 2011–2012: TBV Lemgo
- 2012: Al Sadd
- 2012–2020: TSV Hannover-Burgdorf
- 2020–2022: Rhein-Neckar Löwen
- 2022–2023: ASV Hamm-Westfalen
- 2023–2024: ThSV Eisenach
- 2024: ASV Hamm-Westfalen
- 2024–: TV Emsdetten
National team
- Years: Team
- 2005–: Estonia

Mait Patrail (born 11 April 1988) is an Estonian handball player for German club TV Emsdetten and the Estonian national team.

He was won the Estonian player of the year award 6 times between 2006 and 2011.

== Career ==
Patrail started playing handball at Põlva Serviti, where he debuted for the senior tem in 2004–05. Here he won the 2007 and 2008 Estonian Handball League and the 2008 Baltic Handball League.

In 2008 he joined Swiss team Kadetten Schaffhausen. Here he won the 2010 and 2011 Swiss Handball League.

In 2011 he joined German Bundesliga team TBV Lemgo. In April 2012 he was released of his contract and joined Qatari side Al Sadd, despite having a contract at Lemgo until 2013. In the summer of 2012 he returned to Germany and joined TSV Hannover-Burgdorf.

In 2020 he joined league rivals Rhein-Neckar Löwen. A season later he joined the just promoted team ASV Hamm-Westfalen. When the team was relegated to the 2nd Bundesliga he left the team. He was then without contract until the end of November 2023, when he joined Bundesliga team ThSV Eisenach. Here he played until he end of the season. He then joined the second team of ASV Hamm-Westfalen in the Regionalliga. In November the same year he joined third league team TV Emsdetten.

=== National team ===
At the 2008 Junior European Championship he was the tournament top scorer with 83 goals.

== Private ==
His father, Maidu Patrail, is a former handball player, and his sister Janeli Patrail is also a handball player.
