= Helve Särgava =

Estonian lawyer

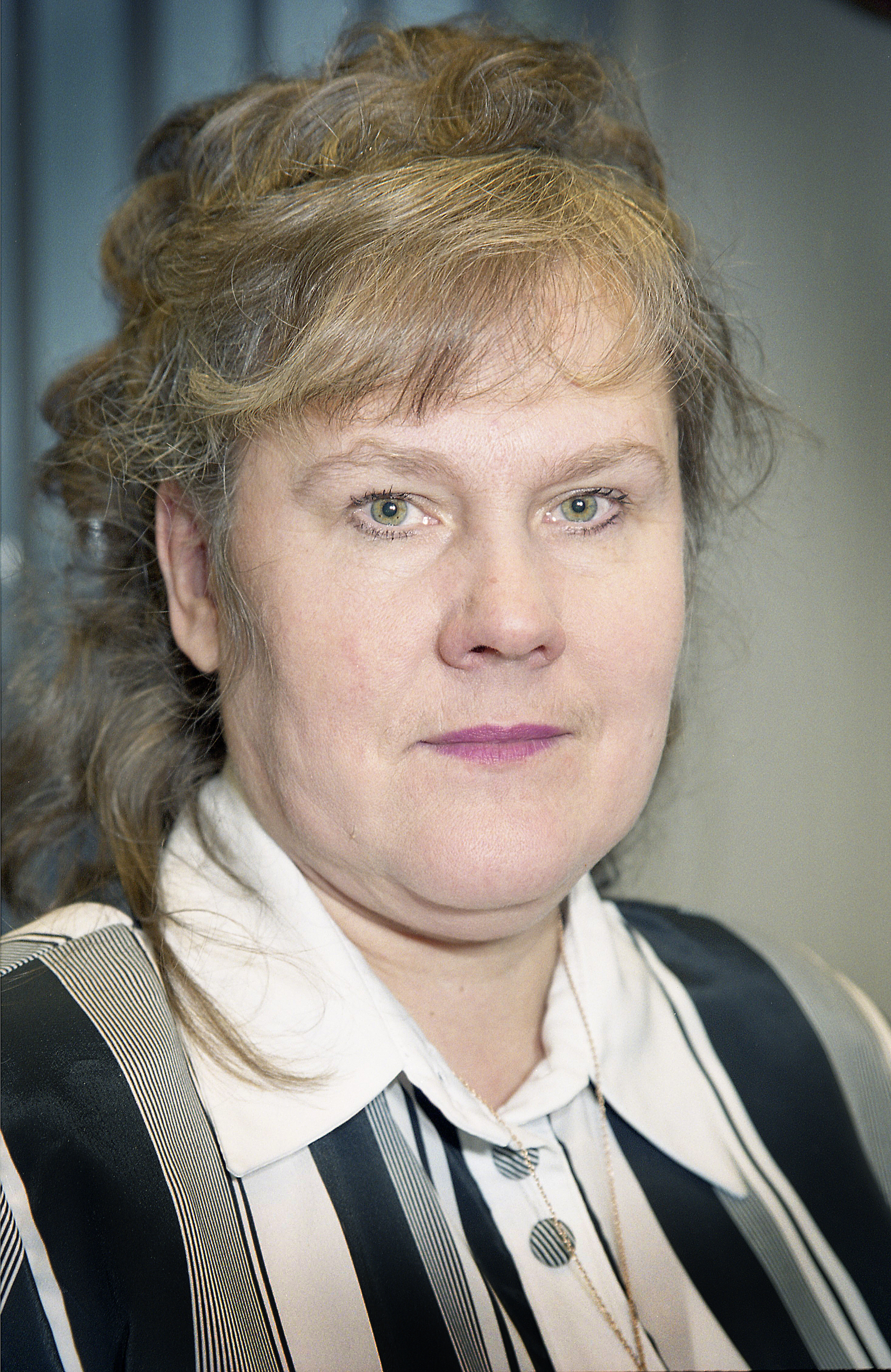
Helve Särgava in 1999

Helve Särgava (née Helve Kuusik; born 6 July 1950) is an Estonian jurist, judge and politician.

== Biography ==
Helge Särgava was born in Põlva. She graduated from the special mathematics-physics class of Nõo High School. In 1975, she graduated from Tartu State University with a degree in law.

In 1975–1976, she worked as a judge intern at the People's Court of Harju District. From 1976 to 1982, Särgava was a judge in the same court. 1982–1991, she was a judge (1985–1991 also the chairman of the court) in the People's Court of Tallinn Sea District. 1991–1995 she was a judge and head of the II department in the Tallinn City Court.

On 14 December 1995, Helve Särgava was appointed as a first instance judge at the Tallinn City Court. From 1 January 11997, she was the chairman of the same city court, until the court was merged with the Harju County Court in 2006. After the reorganization of the city court, she was a judge and chairman of the court in Harju County Court. At the end of 2015, her term as chairman of the county court ended. In February 2016, she submitted a petition to be removed from the judicial office effective 1 March 2016.

From 29 January 2015 to 1 March 2019, she was a member of the Press Council.

In the local government council elections of 2017, she ran as a member of the council on the list of the Social Democratic Party, with the goal of being elected as the chairman of the council. On June 12, 2019, she left the Social Democratic Party and joined the Centre Party on 5 March 2020.

She ran for the Riigikogu in the 2023 elections, collected 180 votes in electoral district No. 3 (Tallinn's Mustamäe and Nõmme districts), but was not elected.

She has been a member of the Estonian Association of Judges.
