= Viimsi HC =

Estonian handball club

Viimsi HC is an Estonian sport club, which is located in Viimsi, Harju County. The club focuses on handball, and the club competes in Meistriliiga.

The club was established before 1997.

In 1997, the club won first place in Meistriliiga.
