= Lootospark =

Estonian football stadium

Coordinates: 58°3′6.42″N 27°2′58.66″E

- Park
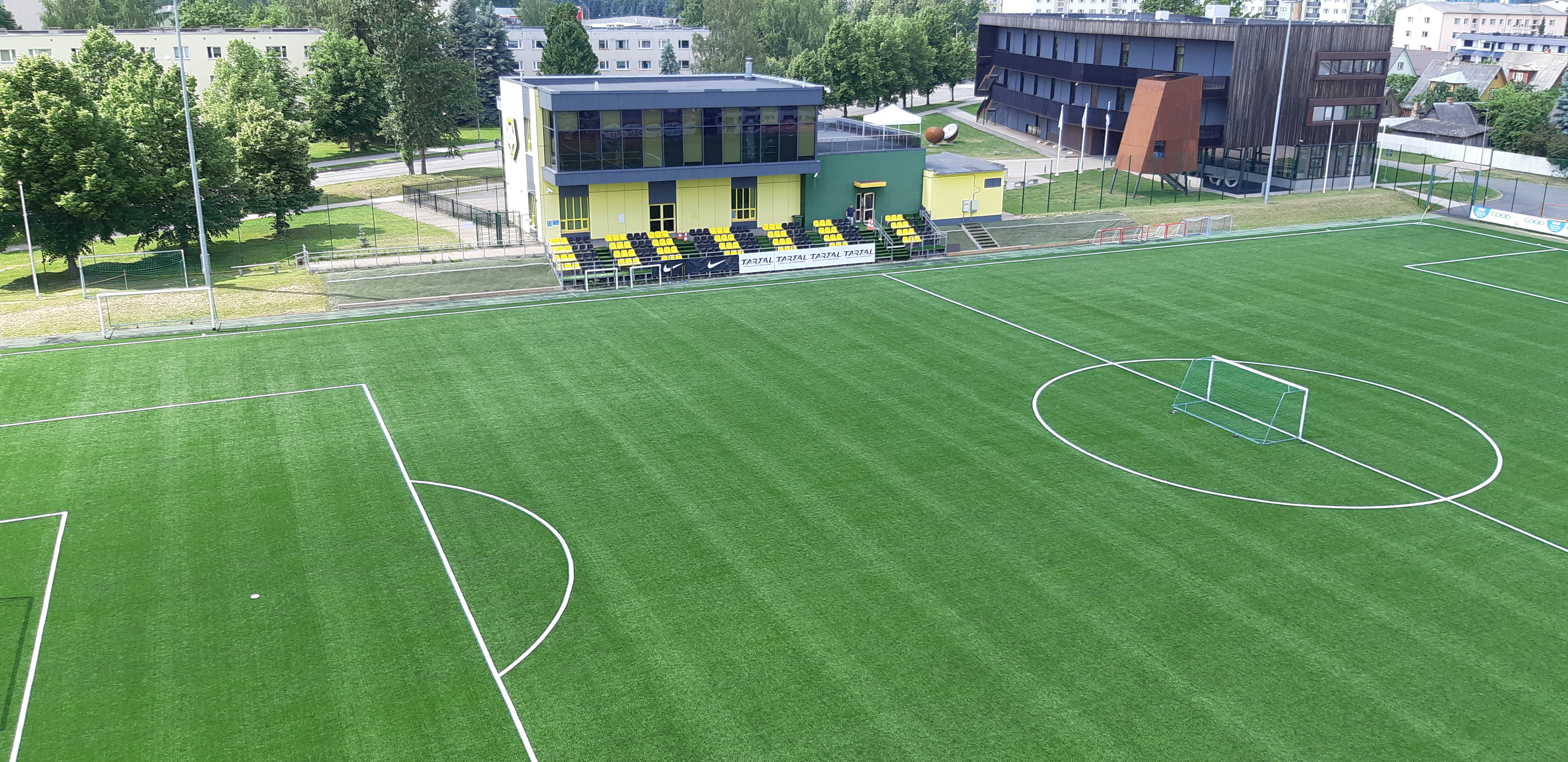
- Interactive map of Lootospark
- Full name: Lootospark
- Location: Põlva, Estonia
- Owner: Põlva County
- Operator: FC Lootos
- Capacity: 300
- Surface: 4G Artificial grass
- Field size: 100 x 64 m

Construction
- Built: 2004
- Opened: 7 November 2004
- Renovated: 8 September 2019
- Architect: Teet Ilves
- Structural engineer: EJL Ehitusbüroo

Tenant
- Põlva FC Lootos (2004–)

Lootospark is a football stadium located in the town of Põlva in Põlva County in Estonia. It is the current home ground of Põlva FC Lootos and clubs women's football team Lootos.

== International matches ==
=== Estonia women's national team matches ===
Date	Opponent	Score	Competition
4 July 2010	Lithuania	3–1	Women's U17 Baltic Cup
2 July 2010	Latvia	4–1	Women's U17 Baltic Cup
26 April 2009	Lithuania	1–0	Women's Baltic Cup
25 April 2009	Latvia	5–0	Women's Baltic Cup
