= Põlva Serviti =

Estonian handball club

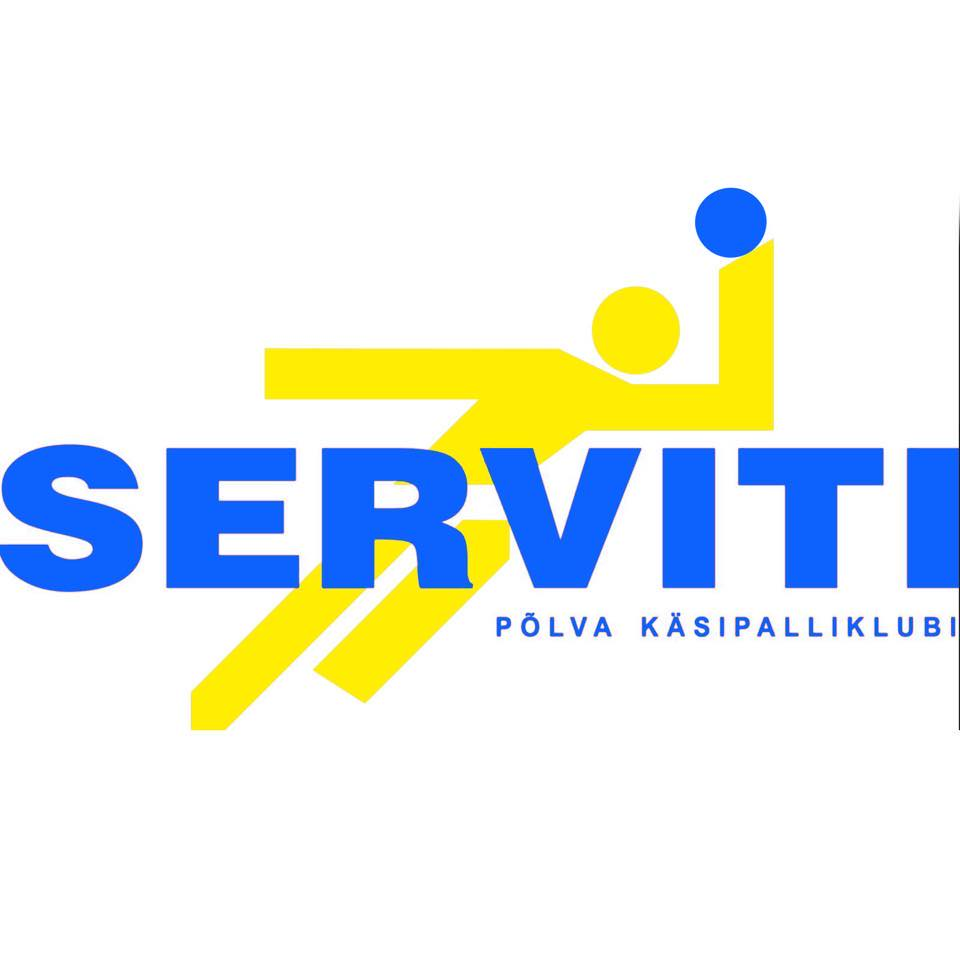
- Full name: Põlva Serviti Käsipalli Klubi
- Short name: Serviti
- Founded: 1984; 42 years ago
- Arena: Põlva Mesikäpa Hall
- Capacity: 612
- President: Andres Neeme
- Head coach: Kalmer Musting
- League: Meistriliiga, Baltic Handball League
- Club colours
Home	Away

Põlva Serviti is an Estonian professional handball team from Põlva. They compete in Meistriliiga and Baltic Handball League.

Location of Põlva Serviti

== History ==
Founded in 1984, the club has won 19 national championships (1998, 2000, 2001, 2002, 2007, 2008, 2010, 2011, 2013, 2015, 2016, 2017, 2018, 2019, 2021, 2022, 2023, 2024, 2025), 14 Estonian Cups (1990, 1992, 1994, 1997, 2000, 2002, 2006, 2009, 2010, 2012, 2016, 2017, 2019, 2021), and 4 Baltic Handball League titles (2008, 2010, 2023, 2025). The club made history in the 2020/2021 season: it became the first Estonian handball club to reach the top 8 of the EHF European Cup, where it was bid farewell by the later finalists, Sweden's Ystads IF.

== Crest, colors, supporters ==
=== Kits ===
HOME
2011–12	2015–16	2016–18	2019–20	2020–22	2022–23	2023–24

AWAY
2016–18	2018-19	2019–20	2020-22	2022-24

== Sports Hall information ==
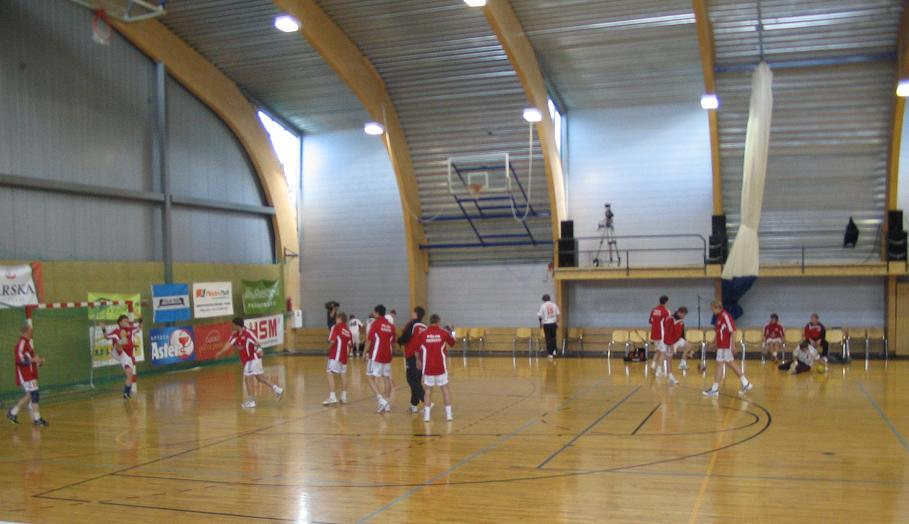
Home hall: Põlva Mesikäpa Hall

- Arena: - Põlva Mesikäpa Hall
- City: - Põlva
- Capacity: - 612
- Address: - Kesk 25, Põlva, 63308 Põlva maakond, Estonia

== Team ==
=== Current squad ===
Squad for the 2025–26 season

Põlva Serviti

Goalkeepers

- 1 (Estonia) Jürgen Lepasson
- 12 (Estonia) Eston Varusk
- 16 (Estonia) Andero Viljus

Left Wingers

- 8 (Estonia) Joonas Vassiljev
- 10 (Estonia) Mathias Rebane
- 13 (Estonia) Henri Sillaste

Right Wingers

- 2 (Estonia) Sander Sarapuu
- 11 (Estonia) Jürgen Rooba

Line Players

- 15 (Latvia) Arturs Meikšans
- 20 (Estonia) Jaanus-Peeter Rüütli
- 66 (Estonia) Hendrik Varul

Central Backs

- 3 (Estonia) Tõnis Kase
- 37 (Estonia) Karlis Kalk
- 77 (Estonia) Alfred Timmo

Left Backs

- 6 (Estonia) Kermo Saksing
- 44 (Estonia) Jass Einassoo

Right Backs

- 95 (Ukraine) Stanislav Kholodiuk

=== Technical staff ===
- Head Coach: (Estonia) Kalmer Musting
- Coach: (Estonia) Rein Suvi
- Physiotherapist: (Estonia) Bäthel-Betty Pirk

=== Transfers ===
Transfers for the 2023–24 season

Joining

- (Ukraine) Stanislav Kholodiuk (RB) from (Italy) SSV Brixen Handball

Leaving

- (Estonia) Carl-Eric Uibo (LB) to (Estonia) Raasiku/Mistra

== Previous squads ==
2020–2021 Team
Shirt No	Nationality	Player	Birth Date	Position
1	Estonia	Jürgen Lepasson	16 September 1988 (age 37)	Goalkeeper
2	Estonia	Sander Sarapuu	23 July 1998 (age 27)	Right Winger
3	Estonia	Tõnis Kase	1 January 1999 (age 27)	Central Back
5	Estonia	Kristjan Muuga	16 September 1984 (age 41)	Right Winger
7	Estonia	Veiko Markel	16 December 1998 (age 27)	Right Winger
8	Estonia	Otto Karl Kont	18 November 1998 (age 27)	Right Back
10	Estonia	Mathias Rebane	12 July 2000 (age 25)	Left Winger
11	Estonia	Raiko Rudissaar	8 August 1994 (age 31)	Central Back
12	Estonia	Eston Varusk	25 March 1984 (age 41)	Goalkeeper
13	Estonia	Henri Sillaste	15 July 1988 (age 37)	Left Winger
15	Latvia	Arturs Meikšans	13 March 1998 (age 27)	Line Player
17	Estonia	Siivo Sokk	1 December 1984 (age 41)	Left Winger
18	Russia	Anatoliy Chezlov	23 April 1987 (age 38)	Central Back
19	Estonia	Ülljo Pihus	11 January 1998 (age 27)	Line Player
20	Estonia	Christofer Viilop	15 May 2000 (age 25)	Goalkeeper
21	Estonia	Indrek Neeme	7 May 1993 (age 32)	Line Player
22	Estonia	Henri Hiiend	22 January 1995 (age 30)	Left Back
23	Estonia	Andris Celminš	4 July 1996 (age 29)	Right Back
24	Estonia	Carl-Eric Uibo	26 June 1998 (age 27)	Left Back
77	Estonia	Alfred Timmo	12 April 2000 (age 25)	Central Back
84	Estonia	Mario Karuse	6 January 1984 (age 41)	Central Back

== Accomplishments ==
- Baltic Handball League:
  - Gold (4): 2008, 2010, 2023, 2025
  - Silver (6): 2011, 2012, 2014, 2018, 2022, 2024
  - Bronze (5): 2006, 2013, 2015, 2016, 2021
- Meistriliiga:
  - Gold (19): 1998, 2000, 2001, 2002, 2007, 2008, 2010, 2011, 2013, 2015, 2016, 2017, 2018, 2019, 2021, 2022, 2023, 2024, 2025
  - Silver (7): 1993, 1994, 1999, 2003, 2004, 2012, 2014
  - Bronze (5): 1992, 1995, 2005, 2006, 2009
- Estonian Cup:
  - Gold (14): 1990, 1992, 1994, 1997, 2000, 2002, 2006, 2009, 2010, 2012, 2016, 2017, 2019, 2021

== EHF ranking ==
As of 05/12/2025

Rank	Team	Points
64	(Slovakia) Tatran Prešov	80
65	(Spain) CB Ademar Leon	78
66	(Italy) SSV Brixen	77
67	(Estonia) Põlva Serviti	77
68	(Norway) Drammen HK	76
69	(Poland) Górnik Zabrze	74
70	(Hungary) Balatonfüredi KSE	73

== Former club members ==
=== Notable former players ===
- (Estonia) Mait Patrail (2004–2008)
- (Estonia) Rein Suvi (1990–2007)
- (Estonia) Alfred Timmo (2009–2021, 2022–)
- (Ukraine) Sergiy Lyubchenko (2016–2019)

=== Former coaches ===
Seasons	Coach	Country
2004–	Kalmer Musting	(Estonia)
