= Mikk Pinnonen =

Estonian handball player

Personal information
- Full name: Mikk Pinnonen
- Nationality: Estonian
- Born: 4 January 1991 (age 35) Helsinki, Finland
- Height: 1.80 m (5 ft 11 in)

Sport
- Sport: Handball
- Position: Playmaker / Left Back
- Current club: Știința Dedeman Bacău

Senior clubs
- Years: Team
- 2008–2009: SK Reval Sport Tallinn
- 2009–2010: Chocolate Boys Tallinn
- 2010–2013: Aarhus Håndbold
- 2013–2014: H 43 Lund
- 2014–: Știința Dedeman Bacău
National team
- Years: Team
- 2008–: Estonia

Mikk Pinnonen (born 4 January 1991) is an Estonian handballer who plays as a playmaker for Știința Municipal Dedeman Bacău in the Romanian Liga Naţională and the Estonian national team.

== National team career ==
Pinnonen's first international match was a 31–22 defeat against Macedonia on 27 November 2008 at the Boris Trajkovski Sports Center in front of 4,000 Macedonian fans. In that match, he scored 4 goals for Estonia aged 17 years.

== Achievements ==
- Danish Handball Cup:
  - Winner: 2013
