= Meistriliiga (handball) =

Estonian handball league

- Founded: 1992
- No. of teams: 6
- Country: Estonia
- Confederation: EHF
- Most recent champion: Põlva Serviti (2026)
- Most titles: Põlva Serviti (20 titles)
- Level on pyramid: 1
- Relegation to: Esiliiga
- International cups: EHF Cup; EHF Challenge Cup
- Website: http://www.handball.ee/est/2020-EMV-ML

The Estonian Meistriliiga is the name of the professional handball league of Estonia.

== Competition format ==
The season begins with a tournament between the six teams. The first four teams qualify for a play-off round. The top two teams of the play-off round qualifies directly to the semifinals, while the others two plays the top two teams of the play-out round in quarterfinals.

== 2024/25 Season participants ==
The following 5 clubs compete in Meistriliiga during the 2024–25 season.

Team	City	Arena
Põlva Serviti	Põlva	Põlva Mesikäpa Hall
HC Kehra/Horizon Pulp&Paper	Kehra	Kehra Spordihoone
Viljandi HC	Viljandi	Viljandi Spordihoone
Mistra	Raasiku	Raasiku Spordihoone
HC Viimsi/Alexela	Viimsi	Viimsi Spordikeskus

== Meistriliiga past champions ==
- 1992 : Valga Maret-Sport
- 1993 : HC Kehra
- 1994 : HC Kehra (2)
- 1995 : HC Kehra (3)
- 1996 : HC Kehra (4)
- 1997 : Viimsi HC
- 1998 : Põlva Serviti
- 1999 : HC Kehra (5)
- 2000 : Põlva Serviti (2)
- 2001 : Põlva Serviti (3)
- 2002 : Põlva Serviti (4)
- 2003 : HC Kehra (6)
- 2004 : HC Kehra (7)
- 2005 : Chocolate Boys Tallinn
- 2006 : HC Kehra (8)
- 2007 : Põlva Serviti (5)
- 2008 : Põlva Serviti (6)
- 2009 : HC Kehra (9)
- 2010 : Põlva Serviti (7)
- 2011 : Põlva Serviti (8)
- 2012 : HC Kehra (10)
- 2013 : Põlva Serviti (9)
- 2014 : HC Kehra (11)
- 2015 : Põlva Serviti (10)
- 2016 : Põlva Serviti (11)
- 2017 : Põlva Serviti (12)
- 2018 : Põlva Serviti (13)
- 2019 : Põlva Serviti (14)
- 2021 : Põlva Serviti (15)
- 2022 : Põlva Serviti (16)
- 2023 : Põlva Serviti (17)
- 2024 : Põlva Serviti (18)
- 2025 : Põlva Serviti (19)
- 2026 : Põlva Serviti (20)

	Club	Titles	Year
1.	Põlva Serviti	20	1998, 2000, 2001, 2002, 2007, 2008, 2010, 2011, 2013, 2015, 2016, 2017, 2018, 2019, 2021, 2022, 2023, 2024, 2025, 2026
2.	HC Kehra	11	1993, 1994, 1995, 1996, 1999, 2003, 2004, 2006, 2009, 2012, 2014
3.	Valga Maret-Sport	1	1992
3.	Viimsi HC	1	1997
3.	Chocolate Boys Tallinn	1	2005

== EHF coefficient ranking ==
For season 2017/2018, see footnote

- 26. (23) (Greece) A1 Ethniki (8.00)
- 27. (36) (Iceland) Olís deildin (7.00)
- 28. (34) (Estonia) Meistriliiga (6.83)
- 29. (29) (Kosovo) Superliga (6.67)
- 30. (21) (Luxembourg) Sales Lentz League (6.00)
