= Pedro Portela =

Portuguese handball player (born 1990)

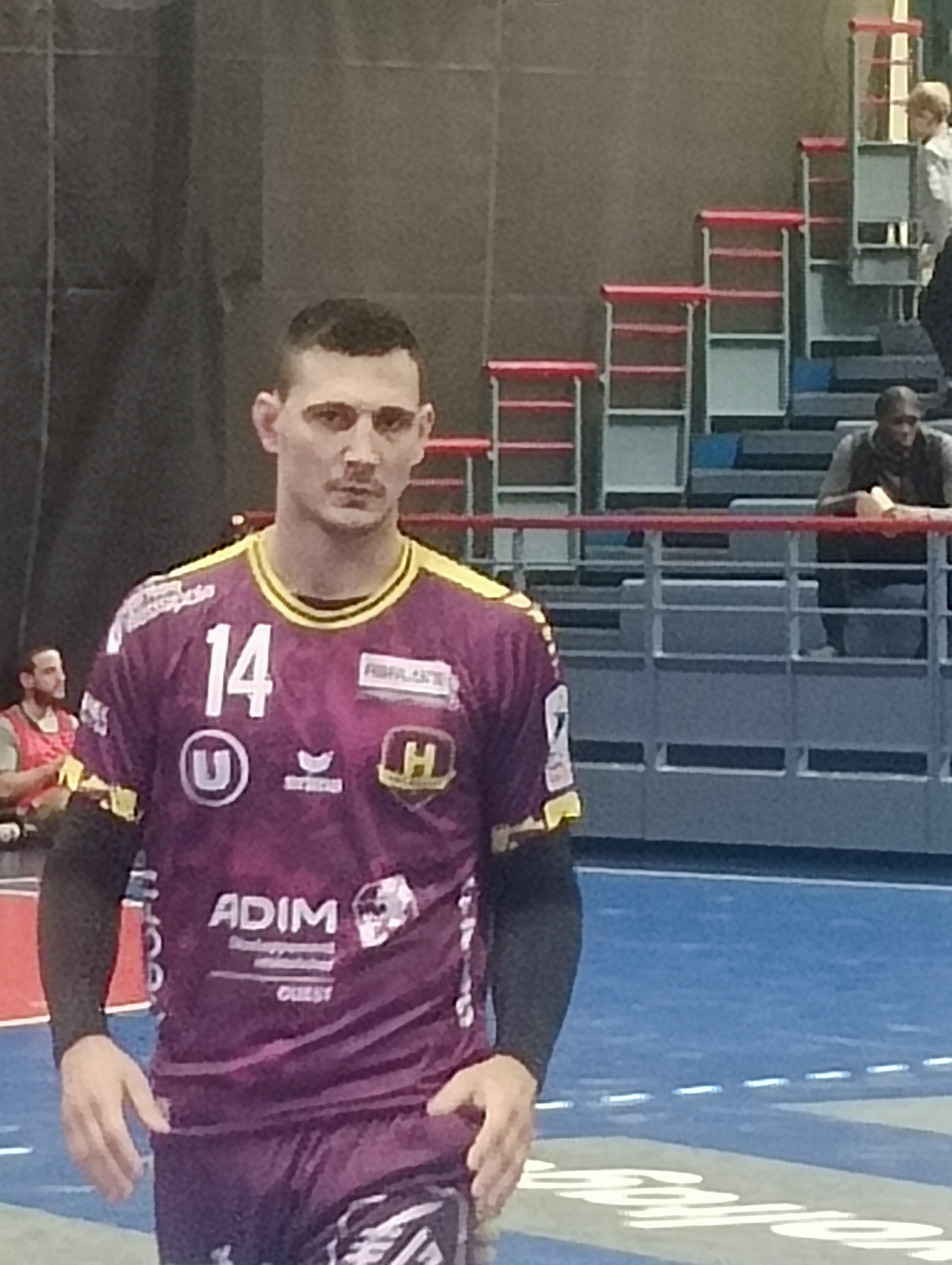

Personal information
- Full name: Pedro André Caseiro Portela
- Nationality: Portuguese
- Born: 6 January 1990 (age 36) Leiria, Portugal
- Height: 1.86 m (6 ft 1 in)

Sport
- Sport: Handball
- Position: Right wing
- Current club: Sporting CP
- Number: 4

Senior clubs
- Years: Team
- 2007–2018: Sporting CP
- 2018–2021: Tremblay-en-France
- 2021–2023: HBC Nantes
- 2023–: Sporting CP
National team
Years	Team	Apps	(Gls)
–	Portugal	88	(286)

Pedro André Caseiro Portela (born 6 January 1990) is a Portuguese handball player for Sporting CP and the Portuguese national team.

He represented Portugal at the 2020 European Men's Handball Championship.

In 2025 he was part of the Portugal team that reached the semifinals of the World Championship for the first time in history. They lost the semifinals to Denmark and the third place playoff to France. At the 2026 European Men's Handball Championship he was part of the Portugal team that got 5th place, their best ever finish at a European Championship. At the 2026 European Men's Handball Championship he was part of the Portugal team that got 5th place, their best ever finish at a European Championship.

== Awards ==
Sporting CP

- Portuguese League
  - Champion: 2016–17, 2017–18, 2023–24
- Portuguese Cup
  - Winner: 2011–12, 2012–13, 2013–14, 2023–24
- Portuguese Super Cup
  - Winner: 2014, 2023, 2024
- EHF European Cup
  - Winner: 2009–10, 2016–17

HBC Nantes

- French Cup
  - Winner: 2022–23
- French League Cup
  - Winner: 2021–22
- French Super Cup
  - Winner: 2022
