= Rein Suvi =

Estonian handball player

Rein Suvi (born 8 January 1969) is an Estonian handballer.

He was born in Pechory, Russia. In 2010 he graduated from the University of Tartu's Institute of Physical Education.

He began his handball career in 1979, coached by Tarmo Volt. He has played on Põlva team, which in 1990, 1992 and 1994 won Estonian cup. 1992–2000 he was a member of Estonia men's national handball team.

Since 1994 he is also been a handball coach. 2014-2018 he was the head coach of Estonia men's national handball team.
