= Maximilian Gerbl =

Swiss handball player

Personal information
- Nationality: Swiss
- Born: 25 June 1995 (age 31) Basel, Switzerland
- Height: 1.79 m (5 ft 10 in)

Sport
- Sport: Handball
- Position: Right wing
- Current club: TSV Hannover-Burgdorf
- Number: 28

Senior clubs
- Years: Team
- 2014-2017: RTV 1879 Basel
- 2017-2022: Kadetten Schaffhausen
- 2022-: TSV Hannover-Burgdorf
National team
| Years | Team | Apps | (Gls) |
| 2017- | Switzerland | 66 | (96) |
- Updated on 2 August 2024

Maximilian Gerbl (born 25 June 1995) is a Swiss handball player for TSV Hannover-Burgdorf and the Swiss national team.

He represented Switzerland at the 2020 European Men's Handball Championship.
