= Pavilhão Desportivo Municipal da Póvoa de Varzim =

Arena in Póvoa de Varzim, Portugal

- Pavilhão da Póvoa
- Interactive map of Pavilhão Desportivo Municipal da Póvoa de Varzim
- Location: Rua D. Maria I, 220 Póvoa de Varzim, Portugal
- Coordinates: 41.38854°N 8.75856°W
- Owner: Varzim Lazer, EM (Municipal company)
- Capacity: 2500

Construction
- Opened: 1998
- Architect: Rui Bianchi

Pavilhão Desportivo Municipal da Póvoa de Varzim, shortened to Pavilhão da Póvoa, is a multifunctional indoor arena located in Póvoa de Varzim, Portugal. It is owned by the City Hall of Póvoa de Varzim and managed by the Varzim Lazer, municipal company, who gets to manage most public sports venues in the city. It is the preferred home arena for the Portuguese volleyball team, also favored by the Portuguese federation of handball.

The arena has several areas, including a sports field, cycling room, fitness room, weight training room, ballet school and jacuzzi-Turkish bath. The secondary areas include a teaching room, press room, press cabinets, doctor and medical cabinet, and bars. It is of easy access by road, easily reached by the A28 and A7 motorways, with parking space and nearby hotels.
