= Põlva =

Town in Estonia

Põlva, Estonia
- Town
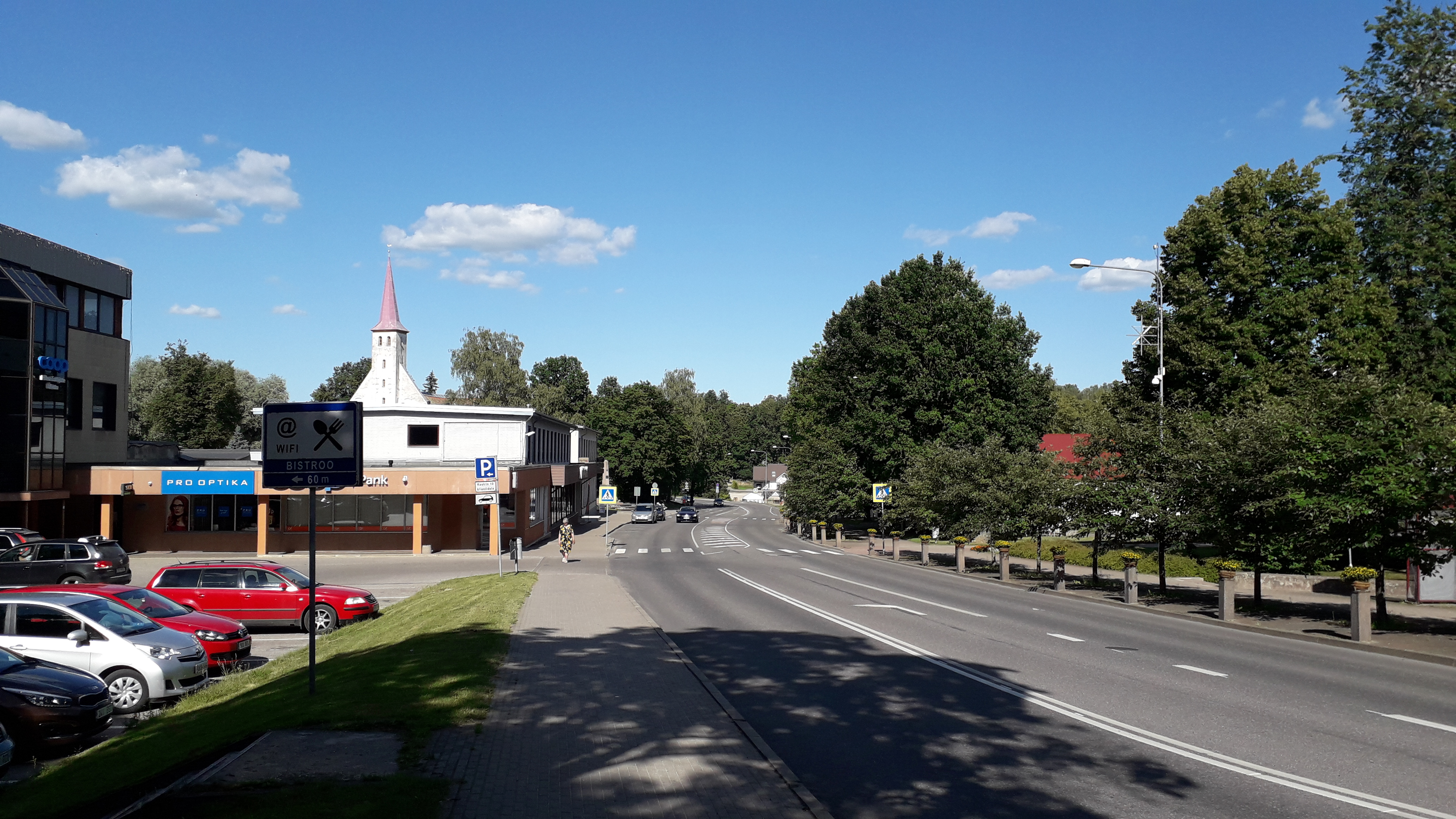

- Location in Estonia
- Coordinates: 58°03′14″N 27°03′16″E
- Country: Estonia
- County: Põlva County
- Municipality: Põlva Parish

Area
  - Total: 5.5 km^{2} (2.1 sq mi)

Population (2026)
  - Total: 5,292
  - Rank: 20th
  - Density: 960/km^{2} (2,500/sq mi)

Ethnicity
  - Estonians: 97%
  - other: 3%
- Time zone: UTC+2 (EET)
  - Summer (DST): UTC+3 (EEST)
- Postal code: 63308

Põlva (Estonian pronunciation: [ˈpɤlˑˈʋɑ]; German: Pölwe) is a town in southeastern Estonia, the county seat of Põlva County, and the centre of Põlva Parish.

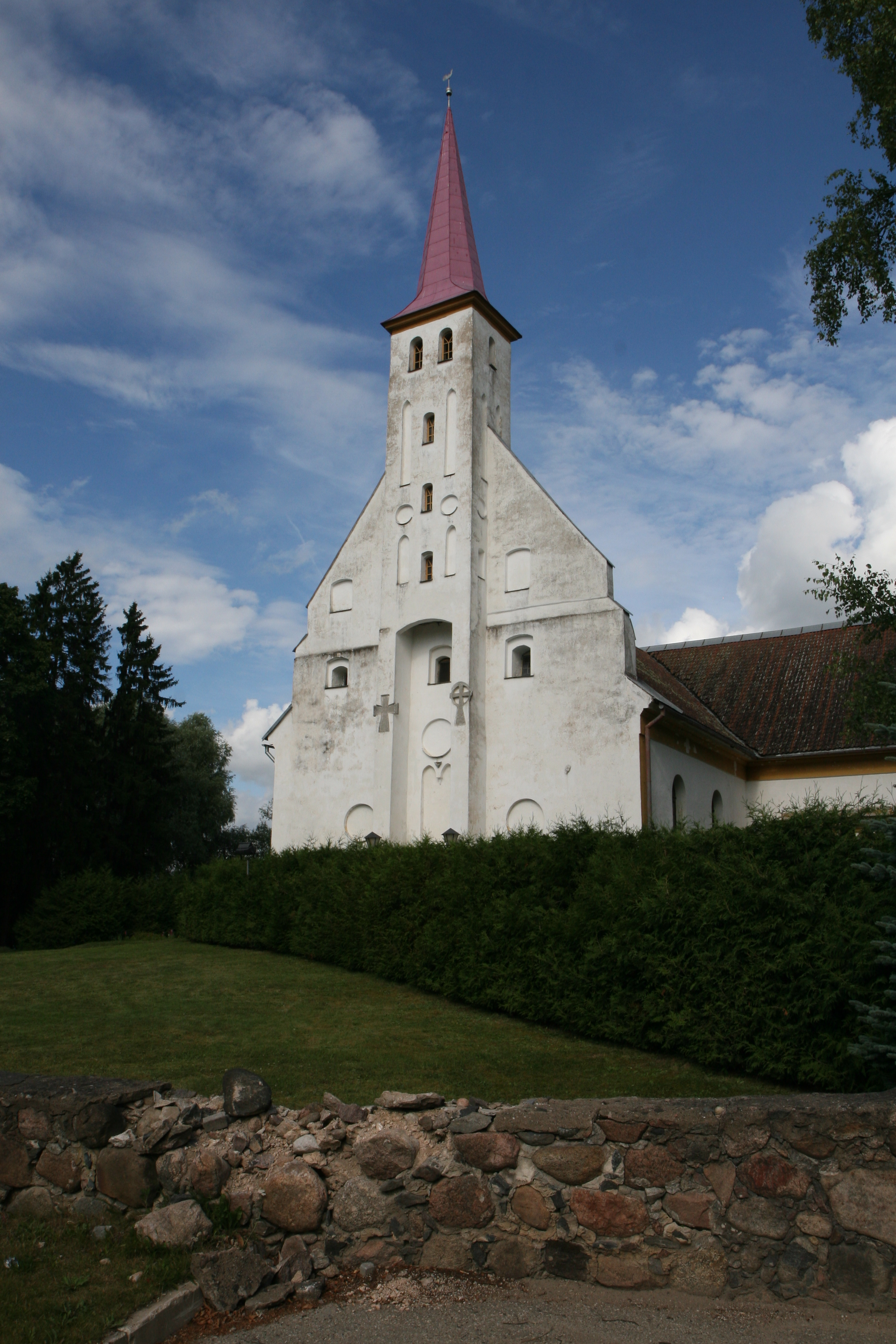
Põlva Church

Põlva is home for the Intsikurmu Music Festival Grounds, which regularly hosts concerts and summer activities, situated in a small forested area on the west side of the town.

== History ==
The name "Põlva" appears in the historical record in 1452. The name seems to derive from the Estonian word for "knee" (põlv). Legend has it that a girl was immured in a kneeling position in St. Mary's Church to keep the devil away. This is reputedly how the town was named.

Põlva was an old military crossroad between the north and south of Livonia. Around 1240, shortly after the Christianization of Estonia, the Bernardine monks built a church, which they dedicated to the Virgin Mary. The church was subordinate to the Bishopric of Dorpat. The same parish was the result of the Livonian War under Russian domination in the 16th century. In 1582 it became part of Dorpat Voivodeship under Polish sovereignty, and later it belonged to Sweden. In 1721, in the Treaty of Nystad, Estonia and Livonia were then ceded to Russia. Then Põlva and its church parish belonged first to Tartu County and from 1783 to newly established Võru County, part of the Governorate of Livonia.

The town was developed around St. Mary's Church, which lay in ruins for a long time until it was rebuilt after the Great Northern War. In 1931, a railway from Tartu to Petseri through Põlva was completed. The population of Põlva began to grow rapidly and the town began to develop when Põlva became the center of the Põlva raion formed in 1950. The town grew around its artificial lake, whose sandy shores teem with vacationers during the summer. On 10 August 1993 Põlva gained town rights.

== Demographics ==
Ethnic composition 1934, 1970-2021
| Ethnicity | 1934 | | 1970 | | 1979 | | 1989 | | 2000 | | 2011 | | 2021 | |
| Ethnicity | amount | % | amount | % | amount | % | amount | % | amount | % | amount | % | amount | % |
|---|---|---|---|---|---|---|---|---|---|---|---|---|---|---|
| Estonians | 392 | 94.7 | 2858 | 92.8 | 4446 | 92.3 | 6560 | 93.2 | 6234 | 96.4 | 5594 | 97.0 | 5303 | 97.2 |
| Russians | 6 | 1.45 | 81 | 2.63 | 234 | 4.86 | 291 | 4.13 | 132 | 2.04 | 99 | 1.72 | 79 | 1.45 |
| Ukrainians | - | - | 3 | 0.10 | 30 | 0.62 | 74 | 1.05 | 36 | 0.56 | 32 | 0.55 | 25 | 0.46 |
| Belarusians | - | - | 5 | 0.16 | 10 | 0.21 | 9 | 0.13 | 9 | 0.14 | 2 | 0.03 | 3 | 0.06 |
| Finns | - | - | 19 | 0.62 | 39 | 0.81 | 47 | 0.67 | 21 | 0.32 | 16 | 0.28 | 10 | 0.18 |
| Jews | - | - | 0 | 0.00 | 0 | 0.00 | 0 | 0.00 | 0 | 0.00 | 1 | 0.02 | 3 | 0.06 |
| Latvians | 1 | 0.24 | 3 | 0.10 | 5 | 0.10 | 3 | 0.04 | 1 | 0.02 | 1 | 0.02 | 3 | 0.06 |
| Germans | 7 | 1.69 | - | - | 42 | 0.87 | 18 | 0.26 | 2 | 0.03 | 1 | 0.02 | 0 | 0.00 |
| Tatars | - | - | - | - | 0 | 0.00 | 4 | 0.06 | 3 | 0.05 | 2 | 0.03 | 0 | 0.00 |
| Poles | - | - | - | - | 1 | 0.02 | 5 | 0.07 | 0 | 0.00 | 1 | 0.02 | 0 | 0.00 |
| Lithuanians | - | - | 0 | 0.00 | 1 | 0.02 | 1 | 0.01 | 1 | 0.02 | 1 | 0.02 | 6 | 0.11 |
| unknown | 0 | 0.00 | 0 | 0.00 | 0 | 0.00 | 0 | 0.00 | 11 | 0.17 | 2 | 0.03 | 10 | 0.18 |
| other | 8 | 1.93 | 111 | 3.60 | 9 | 0.19 | 26 | 0.37 | 17 | 0.26 | 15 | 0.26 | 15 | 0.28 |
| Total | 414 | 100 | 3080 | 100 | 4817 | 100 | 7038 | 100 | 6467 | 100 | 5767 | 100 | 5454 | 100.1 |

== Education ==
The importance of education is indicated by the town's coat of arms, which features a rooster with a pointer from an ABC primer. There are eight educational institutions in Põlva, including the following:

- Põlva Coeducational Gymnasium, which has 737 students;
- Põlva Secondary School, which has 387 students;
- Põlva Roosi School, which has 28 students. This school is for mentally impaired children;
- Põlva Jacob's School, a Christian Lutheran school.

== Culture and sport ==
In summertime, interesting music festivals are held in Põlva. 2011 was the first time for harmonica players to get together and play music. Intsikurmu Music Festival is mostly targeted to young people - good music and visuals on the walls, taking place in tender August nights.

Põlva offers a range of sporting activities, from swimming to horse riding, with facilities including a sports hall and a shooting range.

Handball, is particularly popular in Põlva and can be practised at the local sports school. The town is home to the Serviti Handball Club, which has won numerous Estonian championships and participated in European club competitions.have become the champions of Estonia four times and the club is also a serious competitor outside Estonia.

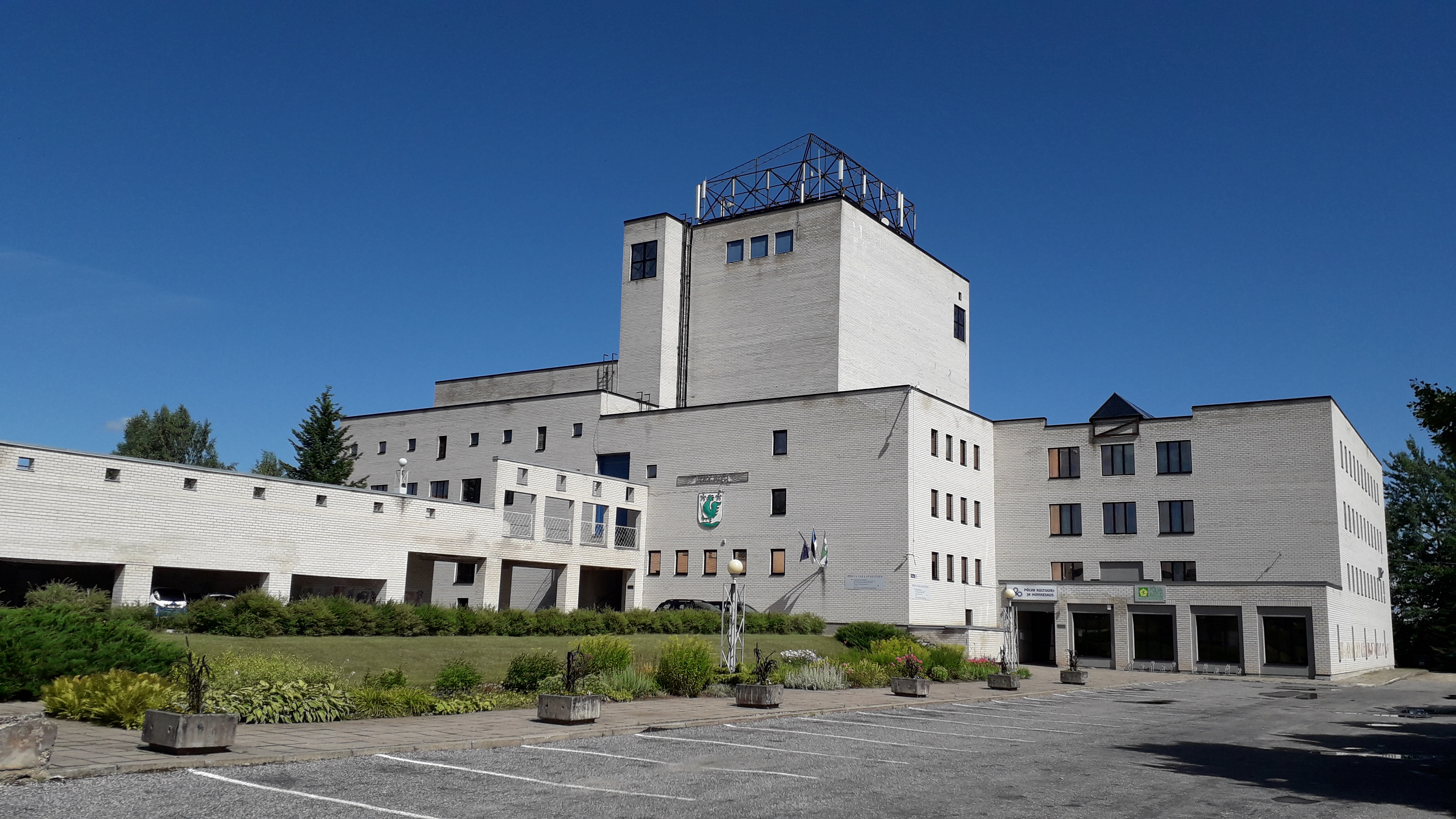
Põlva Kultuurikeskus

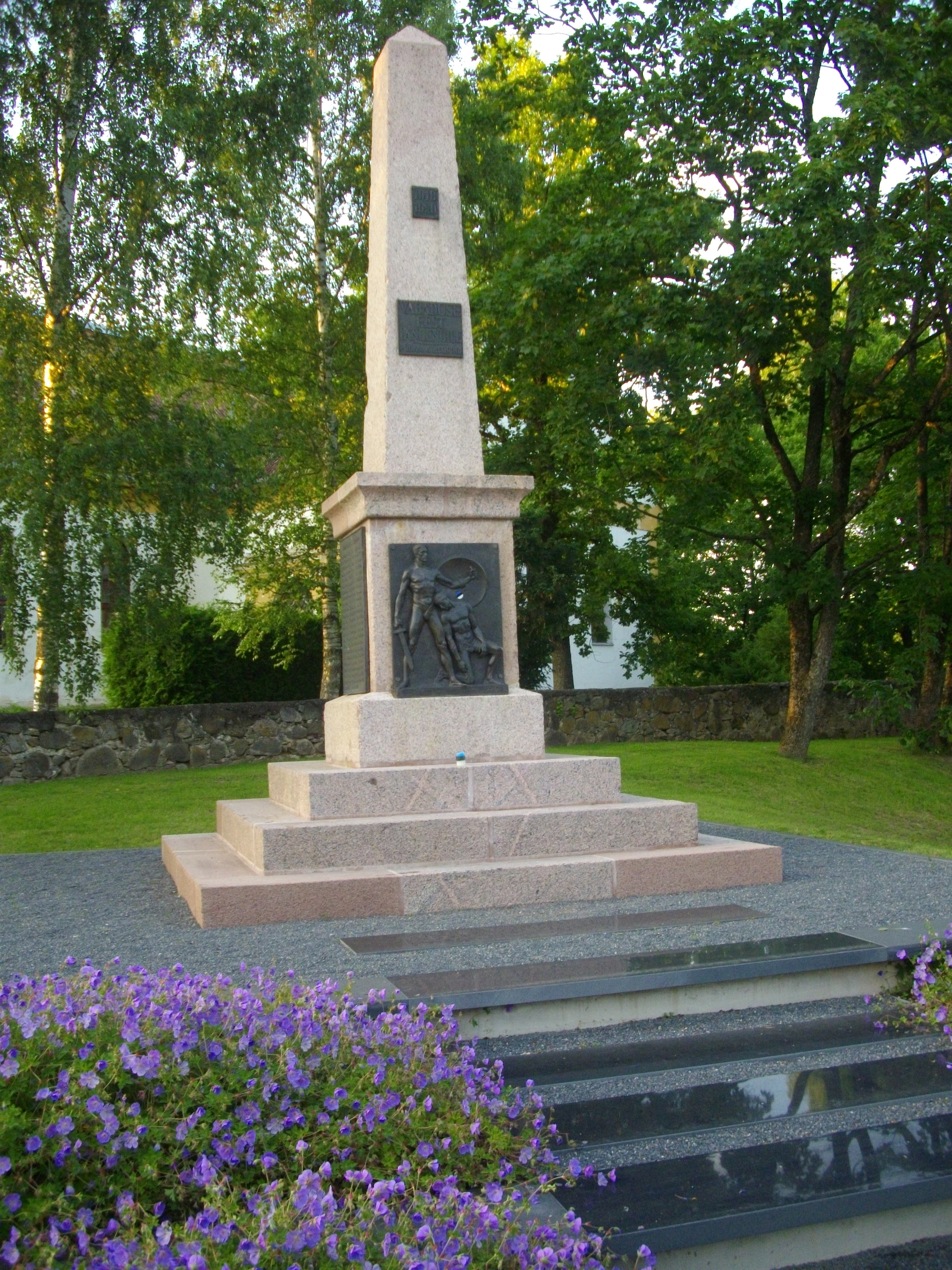
The Estonian War of Independence monument in Põlva

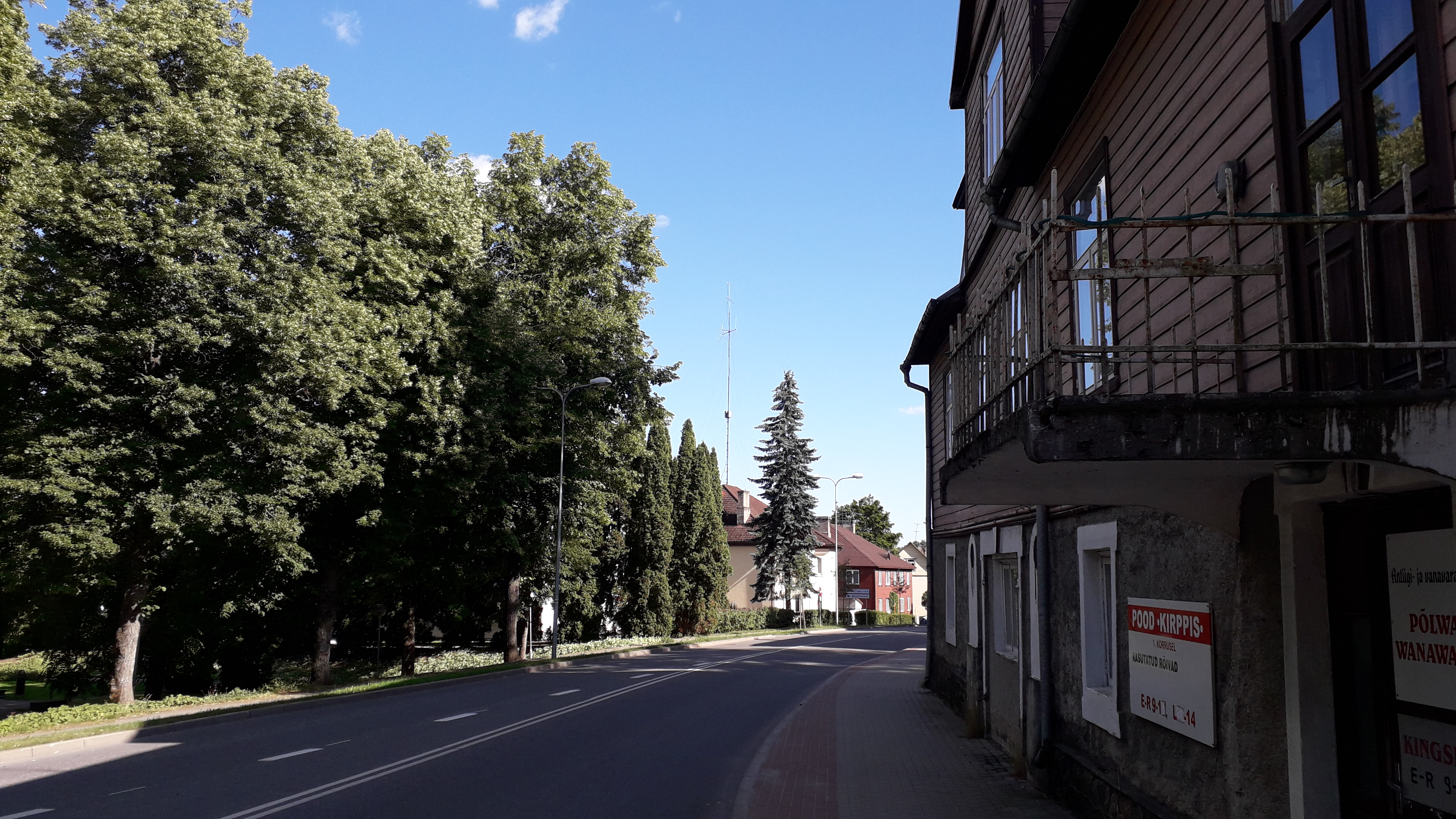
Võru street in Põlva

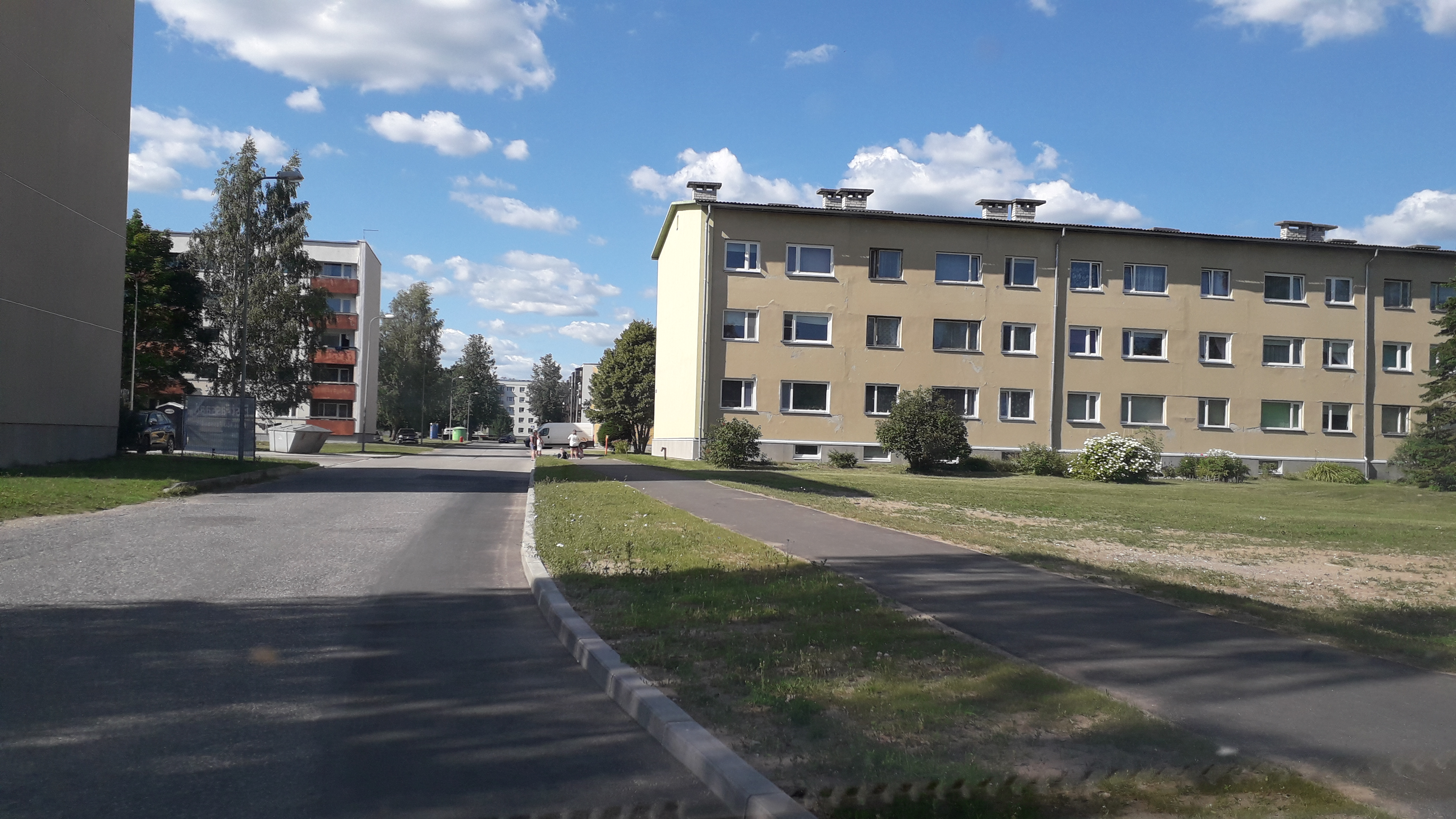
Põlva

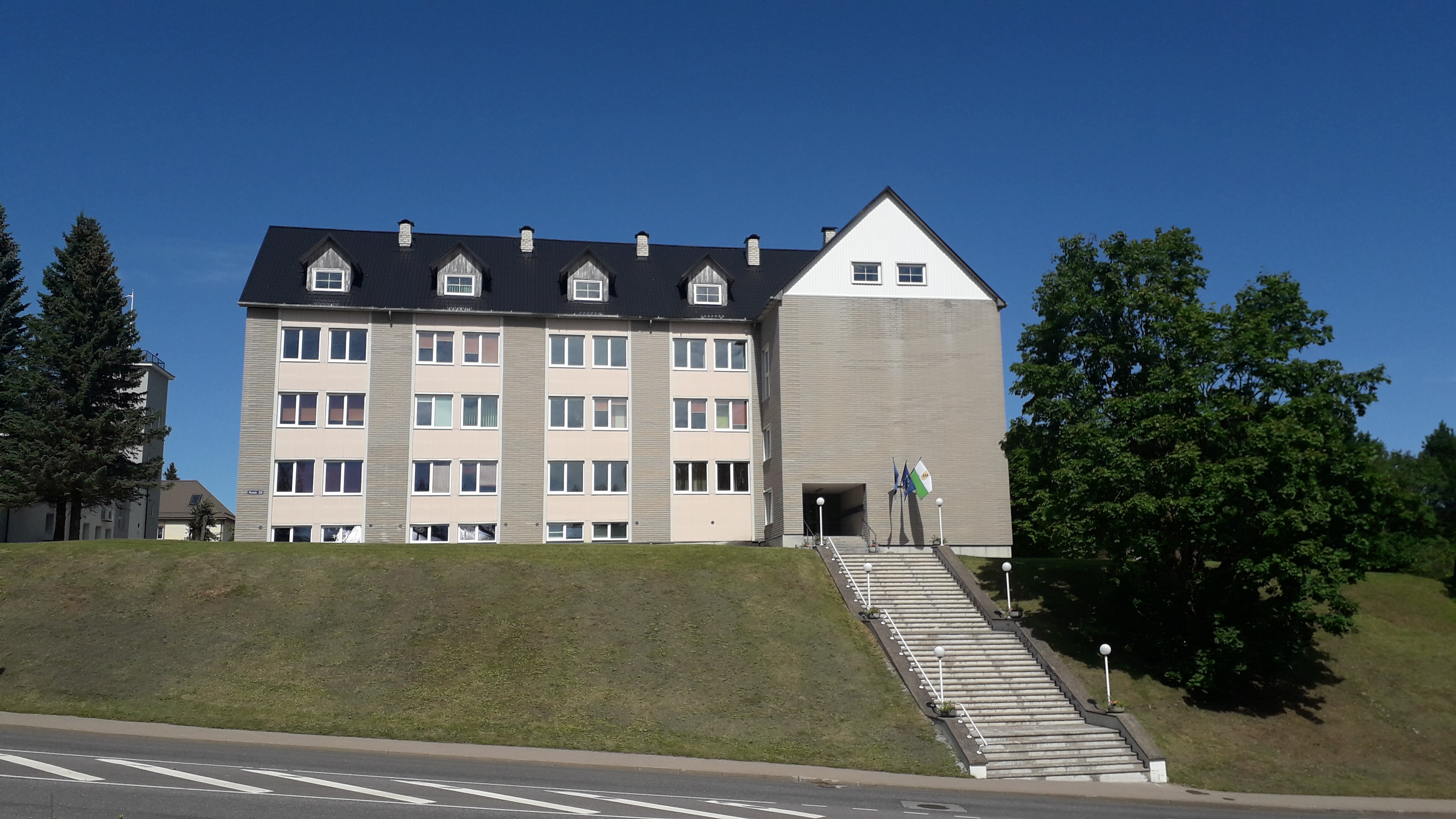
Põlva County administration building

The varied landscape offers inexhaustible opportunities for those who like running, orienteering or cycling. This surely facilitates the success of the sportsmen of the Kobras Orienteering Club at competitions and urges them to organise sports events. Football club Põlva FC Lootos was founded 1994. One of the biggest sport clubs in county more than 30 players for Estonian national team was grown up within club history. Lootospark is a football stadium which is a cooperative project between Põlva Town, Estonian Football Federation and Põlva FC Lootos. This stadium is covered with a third-generation synthetic lawn and its lighting and underheating systems are equipped according to international requirements. The stadium was officially opened on November 7, 2004.

In addition to sports the inhabitants of Põlva are engaged in art and music. In the Põlva Art School one can learn painting, graphic arts and ceramics; the works of various artists are displayed in the Maarja Gallery. The Music School provides musical education and the E STuudio, an ensemble of young people, the brass band, the small symphony orchestra and a number of choirs also practise actively.

== Politics ==
In October 2013, after the municipal elections, Põlva merged with the surrounding Põlva Parish and therefore lost its municipal status.

Before that, the town council consisted of 17 members elected on 18 October 2009. The government consisted of five members that were elected by the council on 20 November 2009. Tarmo Tamm, who was the mayor of Põlva for more than 11 years, went to the parliament in April 2011. Since 11 May 2011 the mayor was Georg Pelisaar.

== Twin towns ==
The former urban municipality of Põlva (until 2013) was twinned with:

- Balvi, Latvia
- Kannus, Finland
- Sebezh, Russia
- Vårgårda, Sweden

== Notable people ==
- Helve Särgava (born 1950), jurist, judge and politician.
- Andres Varik (born 1952), politician and agronomist; member of VIII and IX Riigikogu and Ministry of Regional Affairs and Agriculture, 1997-1999
- Meelika Hainsoo (born 1979), folk singer and musician

=== Sport ===
- Mait Patrail (born 1988), handball player and awarded player of the year 6 times between 2006 and 2011
- Renate-Ly Mehevets (born 1999), footballer who has played over 220 games and 23 for Estonia women
- Karl Hein (born 2002), football goalkeeper, played 42 games for Estonia
