= Dener Jaanimaa =

Estonian handball player (born 1989)

Personal information
- Nationality: Estonian
- Born: 9 August 1989 (age 37) Tallinn, then part of Estonian SSR, Soviet Union
- Height: 1.85 m (6 ft 1 in)

Sport
- Sport: Handball
- Position: Right back
- Current club: Al-Sulaibikat

Senior clubs
- Years: Team
- 2007–2009: Chocolate Boys
- 2009–2011: LIF Lindesberg
- 2011–2013: EHV Aue
- 2013–2015: ThSV Eisenach
- 2015–2016: HSV Hamburg
- 2016: THW Kiel
- 2016–2018: MT Melsungen
- 2018–2019: TuS Nettelstedt-Lübbecke
- 2019–2020: HC Motor Zaporizhzhia
- 2020–2021: HBC CSKA Moscow
- 2021–2024: Daido Steel Phenix
- 2024–: Al-Sulaibikat
National team
Years	Team	Apps	(Gls)
2007–	Estonia	70	(176)

Dener Jaanimaa (born 9 August 1989) is an Estonian handball player who plays for Al-Sulaibikat and the Estonian national team.

== Career ==
He started playing handball at the age of 10. Dener's first professional club was the Estonian Chocolate Boys, for which he played from 2007 to 2009. The handball player then moved to the Swedish Lindesberg. After spending two seasons in Scandinavia, Dener received a ticket to the Bundesliga, where he played for the following teams: Aue, Eisenach, Hamburger SV and Kiel, with which he reached the Final Four of the Champions League, as well as Melsungen and Lübecke. From 2019 to 2020, Dener played for Motor Zaporizhia. In 2020, Dener Jaanimaa moved to CSKA . In 2021, he began playing for the Japanese club Daido Steel.
