= HC Kehra =

Estonian handball club

- Full name: Handball Club Kehra
- Founded: 1991
- Arena: Kehra Spordihoone
- President: Priit Pajus
- Head coach: Janar Mägi
- League: Meistriliiga
- 2021–22: 4th

Handball Club Kehra is an Estonian handball team from Kehra. Their home matches are played at the Kehra Spordihoone. They compete in Meistriliiga.

== Accomplishments ==
- Baltic Handball League:
  - Winners (2) : 2011, 2012
- Meistriliiga:
  - Winners (11) : 1993, 1994, 1995, 1996, 1999, 2003, 2004, 2006, 2009, 2012, 2014
  - Runner-Up (8) : 1997, 1998, 2000, 2005, 2008, 2011, 2013, 2015

== Team ==
=== Current squad ===
Squad for the 2022–23 season

Goalkeepers

- (Estonia) Siim Normak
- (Estonia) Hannes Hapsalo

Wingers
RW

- (Estonia) Alvar Soikka

LW

- (Estonia) Karl Kõverik
- (Estonia) Tanel Vilks
- (Estonia) Sigmar Seermann

Line players

- (Belarus) Anton Barouski
- (United States) Maksim Tanner McCauley
- (Estonia) Mihkel Parm

Back players
LB

- (Estonia) David Mamporia
- (Estonia) Oskar Luks
- (Estonia) Rasmus Eensaar

CB

- (Ukraine) Dmitro Yankovskyi
- (Estonia) Sergio-Silver Kreegimaa

RB

- (Estonia) Indrek Normak
- (Estonia) Kristofer Liedemann
