= 2013–14 Slovenian First League (men's handball) =

1. A liga
- Season: 2013–14
- Champions: Celje (18th title)
- Champions League: Celje
- EHF Cup: Gorenje; Maribor

The 2013–14 Slovenian First League was the 23rd season of the 1. A liga, Slovenia's premier handball league.

== Team information ==
Locations of the 2013–14 Slovenian First League

The following twelve clubs competed in the 1. A liga during the 2013–14 season:

Team	Location	Arena	Capacity
Celje	Celje	Zlatorog Arena	5,500
Gorenje	Velenje	Red Hall	2,500
Izola	Izola	Izola Sports Hall	1,000
Jeruzalem Ormož	Ormož	Hardek Hall	600
Krka	Novo Mesto	Marof Hall	2,000
Krško	Krško	Krško Sports Hall	800
Maribor Branik	Maribor	Tabor Hall	3,261
Ribnica	Ribnica	Ribnica Sports Center	1,000
Sevnica	Sevnica	Sevnica Sports Hall	600
Slovan	Ljubljana	Kodeljevo Hall	1,540
SVIŠ	Ivančna Gorica	OŠ Stična Hall	500
Trimo Trebnje	Trebnje	OŠ Trebnje Hall	1,000

=== Personnel and kits ===
Following is the list of 2013–14 clubs, with their manager, captain, kit manufacturer and shirt sponsor.

Team	President	Head coach	Kit manufacturer	Shirt sponsor
Celje	Dušan Zorko	Branko Tamše	Puma	Pivovarna Laško
Gorenje	Uroš Marolt	Ivan Vajdl	hummel	Gorenje, petrol
Izola	Dean Kočevar	Borut Hren	Kempa	Istrabenz plini
Jeruzalem Ormož	Martin Hebar	Saša Prapotnik	hummel	Jeruzalem Ormož
Krka	Marjan Kukman	Slavko Ivezič	Kempa	Krka
Krško	Boštjan Kozole	Aleksander Markl	hummel	GEN Energija
Maribor Branik	Boris Novak	Marko Šibila	hummel	ZM, Pošta Slovenije
Ribnica	Marko Obrstar	Robert Beguš	Macron	Riko
Sevnica	Vojko Švab	Iztok Godec	Kempa	GEN Energija
Slovan	Marjan Gorišek	Gregor Cvijič	hummel	—
Sviš	Janez Zupančič	Roman Zarabec	hummel	Municipality of Ivančna Gorica
Trimo Trebnje	Anton Janc	Roman Šavrič	hummel	Trimo

== Regular season ==
=== Standings ===
	Team	Pld	W	D	L	GF	GA	Diff	Pts
1	Gorenje	22	21	1	0	767	566	+201	43
2	Celje	22	19	0	3	707	504	+203	38
3	Maribor Branik	22	16	3	3	676	544	+132	35
4	Ribnica	22	13	3	6	590	567	+23	29
5	Trimo Trebnje	22	11	2	9	568	573	−5	24
6	Sevnica	22	8	1	13	562	630	−68	17
7	Jeruzalem Ormož	22	8	0	14	577	682	−105	16
8	Krka	22	7	2	13	546	594	−148	16
9	Slovan	22	7	1	14	607	665	−58	15
10	Izola	22	6	1	15	502	578	−76	13
11	Krško	22	3	4	15	538	638	−100	10
12	SVIŠ	22	3	2	17	555	654	−99	8

Championship Playoff
Relegation Playoff

Pld - Played; W - Won; L - Lost; PF - Points for; PA - Points against; Diff - Difference; Pts - Points.

== Championship play-offs ==
=== Final standings ===
	Team	Pld	W	D	L	GF	GA	Diff	Pts	Qualification
1st place, gold medalist(s)	Celje	10	10	0	0	368	267	+101	58	2014–15 EHF Champions League group stage
2nd place, silver medalist(s)	Gorenje	10	6	1	3	312	273	+39	56	2014–15 EHF Cup round 3
3rd place, bronze medalist(s)	Maribor Branik	10	5	3	2	305	284	+21	48	2014–15 EHF Cup round 2
4	Ribnica	10	1	2	7	264	304	−40	33	
5	Trimo Trebnje	10	3	2	5	268	283	−15	32	
6	Sevnica	10	1	0	9	228	334	−106	19	

Pld - Played; W - Won; L - Lost; PF - Points for; PA - Points against; Diff - Difference; Pts - Points.

1. A liga 2013–14
Champions
Celje
18th Title

Team roster

1 Urban Lesjak, 3 Blaž Blagotinšek, 5 Žiga Mlakar, 6 Gašper Marguč, 7 Rok Žuran, 8 Blaž Janc, 9 David Razgor, 11 Nikola Ranevski, 14 Sebastian Skube, 15 Vid Poteko, 16 Matevž Skok, 18 David Miklavčič, 19 Ivan Slišković, 21 Gregor Potočnik, 23 Stefan Čavor, 24 Nemanja Zelenović, 26 Igor Žabič, 33 Uroš Bundalo, 51 Borut Mačkovšek, 66 Máté Lékai and 77 Luka Žvižej
Head coach: Branko Tamše

=== Results ===
In the table below the home teams are listed on the left and the away teams along the top.

	Celje	Gorenje	Maribor	Ribnica	Sevnica	Trimo
Celje		31–26	45–31	36–30	41–26	30–25
Gorenje	27–36		25–26	33–18	40–26	33–30
Maribor Branik	29–31	34–34		36–26	33–24	35–26
Ribnica	26–37	27–35	26–26		32–18	27–27
Sevnica	20–39	24–33	23–31	28–25		20–31
Trimo Trebnje	27–42	21–26	24–24	28–27	29–19	

== Relegation round ==
=== Final standings ===
	Team	Pld	W	D	L	GF	GA	Diff	Pts
7	Izola	10	6	2	2	269	270	−1	27
8	Jeruzalem Ormož	10	5	0	5	310	276	+34	26
9	Krka	10	4	0	6	268	265	+3	24
10	Slovan	10	4	1	5	284	306	−22	24
11	SVIŠ	10	5	1	4	269	261	+8	19
12	Krško	10	4	0	6	266	288	−22	18

Pld - Played; W - Won; L - Lost; PF - Points for; PA - Points against; Diff - Difference; Pts - Points.

=== Results ===
In the table below the home teams are listed on the left and the away teams along the top.

	Izola	Jeruzalem	Krka	Krško	Slovan	SVIŠ
Izola		32–26	29–25	24–25	30–25	22–21
Jeruzalem Ormož	45–20		30–32	32–27	38–27	26–27
Krka	23–30	26–28		30–21	37–25	26–24
Krško	27–29	26–29	21–20		33–29	30–24
Slovan	28–28	29–28	29–25	37–31		28–26
SVIŠ	25–25	30–28	28–24	34–25	30–27	
