= 2021–22 Slovenian First League (men's handball) =

Handball league season

Slovenian First League
- Season: 2021–22
- Dates: 10 September 2021 – 27 May 2022
- Champion: Celje; 25th title
- Relegated: Ljubljana; Šmartno
- Champions League: Celje
- European League: Trimo Trebnje
- European Cup: Gorenje; Riko Ribnica; Slovenj Gradec
- Top goalscorer: Aleksa Tufegdžić (162 goals)

The 2021–22 Slovenian First League (known as the Liga NLB for sponsorship reasons) was the 31st season of the Slovenian First League, the top men's handball league in Slovenia. A total of fourteen teams contested this season's league, which began on 10 September 2021 and concluded on 27 May 2022.

Celje won their twenty-fifth title.

== Teams ==
Locations of the 2021–22 Slovenian First League teams

Krka and Izola were relegated in the previous season. Šmartno and SVIŠ were promoted from the second division.

=== Arenas and locations ===
The following 14 clubs competed in the Slovenian First League during the 2021–22 season:

Team	Location	Arena	Capacity
Celje	Celje	Zlatorog Arena	5,191
Dobova	Dobova	Dobova Sports Hall	500
Gorenje	Velenje	Red Hall	2,500
Jeruzalem Ormož	Ormož	Hardek Hall	700
Koper	Koper	Arena Bonifika	3,000
Ljubljana	Ljubljana	Krim Sports Hall	400
Maribor Branik	Maribor	Tabor Hall / Lukna Sports Hall	3,261 / 2,100
Riko Ribnica	Ribnica	Ribnica Sports Centre	600
Slovan	Ljubljana	Kodeljevo Hall	1,540
Slovenj Gradec	Slovenj Gradec	Slovenj Gradec Sports Hall	1,200
Šmartno	Šmartno pri Litiji	Pungrt Hall	700
SVIŠ	Ivančna Gorica	OŠ Stična Hall	500
Trimo Trebnje	Trebnje	OŠ Trebnje Hall	800
Urbanscape Loka	Škofja Loka	Poden Sports Hall	800

== League table ==
Pos	Team	Pld	W	D	L	GF	GA	GD	Pts	Qualification or relegation
1	Celje (C)	26	24	1	1	871	674	+197	49	Qualification for Champions League group phase
2	Trimo Trebnje	26	21	3	2	784	677	+107	45	Qualification for European League first qualifying round
3	Gorenje	26	18	2	6	830	667	+163	38	Qualification for European Cup second qualifying round
4	Riko Ribnica	26	14	3	9	767	740	+27	31	Qualification for European Cup second qualifying round
5	Slovenj Gradec	26	14	1	11	743	730	+13	29	Qualification for European Cup first qualifying round
6	Koper	26	13	2	11	731	703	+28	28	
7	Urbanscape Loka	26	14	0	12	711	682	+29	28	
8	Maribor Branik	26	11	2	13	683	721	−38	24	
9	Slovan	26	9	3	14	683	724	−41	21	
10	Jeruzalem Ormož	26	9	3	14	713	777	−64	21	
11	Dobova	26	9	2	15	691	755	−64	20	
12	SVIŠ	26	6	0	20	658	741	−83	12	
13	Ljubljana (R)	26	3	3	20	747	856	−109	9	Relegated to 1. B Liga
14	Šmartno (R)	26	3	3	20	667	832	−165	9	Relegated to 1. B Liga

Source: Handball Federation of Slovenia (in Slovene), Flashscore
Rules for classification: 1) points; 2) goal difference; 3) goals scored; 4) head-to-head points; 5) head-to-head goal difference; 6) head-to-head number of goals scored.
(C) Champions; (R) Relegated

== Top goalscorers ==
Rank	Player	Club	Goals
1	(Serbia) Aleksa Tufegdžić	Slovan	162
2	(Slovenia) Uroš Miličevič	Riko Ribnica	143
3	(Slovenia) Kenan Pajt	Gorenje	133
4	(Slovenia) Uroš Štumpfl	Slovenj Gradec	129
5	(Slovenia) Tine Poklar	Koper	127
6	(Slovenia) Jure Lukman	Ljubljana	126
7	(Slovenia) Matic Verdinek	Gorenje	123
7	(Slovenia) Nik Rantah	Dobova	123
9	(Croatia) Rudolf Zvonimir Šafranko	Dobova	121
10	(Slovenia) Rok Cvetko	Slovenj Gradec	120
