= 2014–15 Slovenian First League (men's handball) =

1. A liga
- Season: 2014–15
- Champions: Celje (19th title)
- Relegated: SVIŠ; Krško
- Champions League: Celje
- EHF Cup: Gorenje; Maribor
- Biggest home win: Celje 54–19 Izola
- Biggest away win: Krško 19–47 Celje
- Highest scoring: Celje 47–30 Slovan

The 2014–15 Slovenian First League (known as the 1. NLB Leasing Liga for sponsorship reasons) was the 24th season of the 1. A liga, Slovenia's premier handball league.

== Team information ==
Locations of the 2014–15 Slovenian First League teams

The following 14 clubs competed in the 1. A liga during the 2014–15 season:

Team	Location	Arena	Capacity
Celje	Celje	Zlatorog Arena	5,500
Gorenje	Velenje	Red Hall	2,500
Izola	Izola	Izola Sports Hall	1,000
Jeruzalem	Ormož	Hardek Hall	600
Krka	Novo Mesto	Marof Hall	2,000
Krško	Krško	Krško Sports Hall	800
Loka	Škofja Loka	Poden Sports Hall	1,000
Maribor Branik	Maribor	Tabor Hall	3,261
Ribnica	Ribnica	Ribnica Sports Center	1,000
Sevnica	Sevnica	Sevnica Sports Hall	600
Slovan	Ljubljana	Kodeljevo Hall	1,540
Slovenj Gradec 2011	Slovenj Gradec	Vinka Cajnka Hall	1,200
SVIŠ	Ivančna Gorica	OŠ Stična Hall	500
Trimo	Trebnje	OŠ Trebnje Hall	1,000

=== Personnel and kits ===
Following is the list of 2014–15 clubs, with their manager, captain, kit manufacturer and shirt sponsor.

Team	President	Head coach	Kit manufacturer	Shirt sponsor(s)
Celje	Bojan Cizej	Branko Tamše	adidas	Pivovarna Laško
Gorenje	Uroš Marolt	Ivan Vajdl	hummel	Gorenje, Petrol
Izola	Dean Kočevar	Borut Hren	Kempa	Istrabenz plini
Jeruzalem Ormož	Martin Hebar	Saša Prapotnik	hummel	Jeruzalem Ormož
Krka	Marjan Kukman	Mirko Skoko	Kempa	Krka
Krško	Rafko Zorič	Nenad Stojaković	hummel	GEN Energija
Loka	Matjaž Ljubec	Robi Bradeško	Royal	Urbanscape
Maribor Branik	Boris Novak	Marko Šibila, Boris Denić	hummel	ZM, Pošta Slovenije
Ribnica	Marko Obrstar	Robert Beguš	Macron	Riko
Sevnica	Vojko Švab	Iztok Godec	Kempa	GEN Energija
Slovan	Marjan Gorišek	Boštjan Ficko	hummel	Energetika Ljubljana
Slovenj Gradec 2011	Matej Nabernik	Sebastjan Sovič	hummel	Saloon
SVIŠ	Janez Zupančič	Miloš Aksentijevič	hummel	Municipality of Ivančna Gorica
Trimo Trebnje	Anton Janc	Roman Šavrič	hummel	Trimo

== Regular season ==
=== Standings ===
	Team	Pld	W	D	L	GF	GA	Diff	Pts
1	Celje	26	26	0	0	1005	617	+388	52
2	Gorenje	26	24	0	2	899	653	+246	48
3	Maribor Branik	26	20	1	5	851	683	+168	41
4	Trimo Trebnje	26	17	1	8	737	685	+52	35
5	Ribnica	26	16	1	9	741	697	+44	33
6	Loka	26	12	2	12	702	705	−3	26
7	Jeruzalem Ormož	26	11	3	12	686	739	−53	25
8	Slovenj Gradec 2011	26	11	0	15	688	794	−106	22
9	Krka	26	9	2	15	710	772	−62	20
10	Slovan	26	9	1	16	708	775	−67	19
11	Izola	26	8	2	16	662	744	−82	18
12	Sevnica	26	6	1	19	605	729	−124	13
13	SVIŠ	26	4	2	20	694	843	−149	10
14	Krško	26	1	0	25	653	905	−252	2

Championship Playoff
Relegation Playoff

Pld - Played; W - Won; D - Drawn; L - Lost; PF - Points for; PA - Points against; Diff - Difference; Pts - Points.

=== Schedule and results ===
In the table below the home teams are listed on the left and the away teams along the top.

	Celje	Gorenje	Izola	Jeruzalem	Krka	Krško	Loka	Maribor	Ribnica	Sevnica	Slovan	S. Gradec	SVIŠ	Trimo
Celje		32–31	54–19	41–28	36–24	43–23	36–20	37–31	36–24	37–23	47–30	44–23	48–19	43–22
Gorenje	24–27		32–24	33–20	38–22	50–25	36–27	33–31	42–22	37–21	41–30	38–15	35–31	37–28
Izola	15–39	25–26		22–20	28–25	35–25	27–27	20–33	17–26	26–20	25–28	30–31	33–27	23–32
Jeruzalem	24–34	17–34	30–27		31–25	31–25	28–26	22–31	33–31	29–23	25–25	33–23	26–26	24–22
Krka	21–28	31–41	29–27	30–30		34–25	28–30	32–34	23–27	28–30	29–34	36–30	30–24	24–24
Krško	19–47	22–34	27–34	25–33	27–33		29–30	29–40	26–35	28–23	26–35	24–31	28–33	22–44
Loka	28–36	27–28	26–20	21–26	34–22	35–20		18–34	25–29	18–15	34–30	29–25	33–28	28–21
Maribor	33–36	31–36	28–25	36–28	37–24	39–26	29–26		24–24	33–18	37–23	32–27	39–22	30–29
Ribnica	22–38	22–30	26–23	38–27	38–21	36–24	22–30	23–24		32–25	28–24	36–30	39–30	24–19
Sevnica	17–32	22–33	22–27	25–22	21–28	29–25	27–27	22–34	24–29		24–28	27–28	29–20	23–30
Slovan	23–39	25–28	25–30	34–26	19–26	29–28	23–25	27–34	24–27	23–22		28–29	33–26	26–35
S. Gradec	23–35	28–33	32–24	29–27	26–32	29–26	20–28	17–36	25–22	22–23	29–27		32–30	26–35
SVIŠ	23–44	24–39	27–27	24–25	26–31	31–30	33–31	31–35	34–29	23–24	27–32	28–29		27–34
Trimo	25–36	23–30	27–25	29–23	27–22	34–19	27–25	28–27	25–24	31–25	28–23	31–28	27–21	
