= 2010–11 Slovenian First League (men's handball) =

Slovenian First League of Handball
- Season: 2010–11
- Champions: Koper
- Relegated: Slovenj Gradec; Slovan
- Champions League: Koper
- EHF Cup: Gorenje
- EHF Cup Winners' Cup: Celje
- EHF Challenge Cup: Maribor

The 2010–11 Slovenian First League of Handball season was the 20th season of the 1. A liga.

== Teams information ==
Location of teams in the 2010–11 Slovenian First League

Team	Location	Stadium	Capacity
Celje	Celje	Zlatorog Arena	5,500
Gorenje	Velenje	Red Hall	3,000
Koper	Koper	Bonifika Hall	3,200
Krka	Novo Mesto	Marof Hall	2,000
Maribor Branik	Maribor	Tabor Hall	3,261
Loka	Škofja Loka	Poden Sports Hall	1,000
Jeruzalem Ormož	Ormož	Hardek Hall	600
Slovenj Gradec	Slovenj Gradec	Vinka Cajnka Hall	1,200
Ribnica	Ribnica	Sports Centre	1,000
Slovan	Ljubljana	Kodeljevo Hall	1,540
Šmartno	Šmartno pri Litiji	Pungrt Hall	700
Trimo Trebnje	Trebnje	OŠ Trebnje Hall	1,000

== Regular season ==
=== Standings ===
	Team	Pld	W	D	L	GF	GA	Diff	Pts
1	Gorenje Velenje	22	21	0	1	736	577	+159	42
2	Cimos Koper	22	18	1	3	725	585	+140	37
3	Celje	22	16	0	6	776	641	+135	32
4	Trimo Trebnje	22	13	1	8	694	652	+42	27
5	Loka	22	11	4	7	689	629	+60	26
6	Maribor	22	10	4	8	626	610	+16	24
7	Ribnica	22	9	1	12	674	681	–7	19
8	Krka	22	8	2	12	655	707	–52	18
9	Jeruzalem Ormož	22	8	0	14	627	693	–66	16
10	Slovan	22	5	0	17	638	746	–108	10
11	Šmartno	22	3	1	18	583	700	–117	7
12	Slovenj Gradec	22	3	0	19	521	723	–202	6

Champion Playoff
Relegation Round

Pld – Played; W – Won; L – Lost; PF – Points for; PA – Points against; Diff – Difference; Pts – Points.

== Championship play-offs ==
=== Standings ===
	Team	Pld	W	D	L	GF	GA	Diff	Pts	Qualification
1	Cimos Koper	10	9	0	1	310	266	+44	55	2011–12 EHF Champions League group stage
2	Gorenje Velenje	10	4	1	5	288	291	-3	51	2011–12 EHF Cup third round
3	Celje	10	4	0	6	287	288	–1	40	2011–12 EHF Cup Winners' Cup
4	Loka	10	6	1	3	315	300	+15	39	
5	Maribor	10	4	0	6	294	302	–8	32	
6	Trimo Trebnje	10	2	0	8	281	328	–47	31	

Pld – Played; W – Won; L – Lost; PF – Points for; PA – Points against; Diff – Difference; Pts – Points.

== Relegation round ==
	Team	Pld	W	D	L	GF	GA	Diff	Pts	Relegation
1	Ribnica	10	8	1	1	330	284	+46	36	
2	Krka	10	4	2	4	294	292	+2	28	
3	Jeruzalem Ormož	10	4	0	6	302	314	–12	24	
4	Šmartno	10	5	1	4	288	287	+1	18	
5	Slovenj Gradec	10	4	1	5	249	264	–15	15	Dissolved
6	Slovan	10	2	1	7	292	314	–22	15	Relegation to the 2011–12 Slovenian Second League

Pld – Played; W – Won; L – Lost; PF – Points for; PA – Points against; Diff – Difference; Pts – Points.
