= 2016–17 Slovenian First League (men's handball) =

1. A liga
- Season: 2016–17
- Champions: Celje (21st title)
- Relegated: Slovenj Gradec 2011; Dol Hrastnik; Drava Ptuj; Izola

The 2016–17 Slovenian First League (known as the Liga NLB for sponsorship reasons) was the 26th season of the 1. A liga, Slovenia's premier handball league.

== Team information ==
Locations of the 2016–17 Slovenian First League teams

The following 14 clubs competed in the 1. A liga during the 2016–17 season:

Team	City	Arena	Notes
RK Celje Pivovarna Laško	Celje	Zlatorog Arena	Teams entering in Championship Round
RK Gorenje Velenje	Velenje	Red Hall	Teams entering in Championship Round
RD Riko Ribnica	Ribnica	Ribnica Sports Center	
RD Koper 2013	Koper	Arena Bonifika	
RK Maribor Branik	Maribor	Tabor Hall	
RD Urbanscape Loka	Loka	Poden Sports Hall	
MRK Krka	Novo Mesto	Marof Hall	
RK Jeruzalem Ormož	Ormož	Hardek Hall	
RK Trimo Trebnje	Trebnje	OŠ Trebnje Hall	
MRD Dobova	Dobova	Dobova Sports Hall	
RD Istrabenz Plini Izola	Izola	Izola Sports Hall	
RK Slovenj Gradec 2011	Slovenj Gradec	Vinka Cajnka Hall	
RK Dol TKI Hrastnik	Dol pri Hrastniku	Dolanka Sports Hall	
RK Drava Ptuj	Ptuj	OŠ Ljudski vrt Ptuj	

== Regular season ==
=== Standings ===
Pos	Team	Pld	W	D	L	GF	GA	GD	Pts	Qualification
1	RD Koper 2013	22	18	2	2	659	548	+111	38	Championship Group
2	RD Riko Ribnica	22	17	2	3	675	568	+107	36	Championship Group
3	RD Urbanscape Loka	22	12	5	5	593	538	+55	29	Championship Group
4	MRK Krka	22	13	2	7	621	562	+59	28	Championship Group
5	RK Maribor Branik	22	12	2	8	627	586	+41	26	Relegation Group
6	RK Trimo Trebnje	22	9	5	8	581	566	+15	23	Relegation Group
7	MRD Dobova	22	11	1	10	559	549	+10	23	Relegation Group
8	RK Jeruzalem Ormož	22	11	1	10	606	598	+8	23	Relegation Group
9	RK Slovenj Gradec 2011	22	6	3	13	570	601	−31	15	Relegation Group
10	RK Dol TKI Hrastnik	22	7	1	14	555	623	−68	15	Relegation Group
11	RK Drava Ptuj	22	3	2	17	558	677	−119	8	Relegation Group
12	RD Istrabenz Plini Izola	22	0	0	22	444	632	−188	0	Relegation Group

Source: RZS

=== Results ===
Home \ Away	DOB	DOL	IZO	KOP	KRK	LOK	MAR	ORM	PTU	RIB	SLO	TRE
MRD Dobova		22–21	25–19	22–23	31–28	23–25	25–28	28–24	29–22	21–24	31–21	30–30
RK Dol TKI Hrastnik	20–30		25–22	27–32	26–31	27–27	29–28	31–36	34–24	23–29	28–23	24–21
RD Istrabenz Plini Izola	17–24	20–25		18–24	18–26	26–27	16–25	21–26	20–26	22–35	17–33	24–28
RD Koper 2013	35–29	36–21	29–19		27–23	32–27	32–20	33–27	37–26	22–22	29–23	39–34
MRK Krka	30–22	29–20	33–25	29–23		24–30	35–32	28–21	26–25	25–28	34–23	27–23
RD Urbanscape Loka	24–20	35–24	33–14	25–24	18–18		33–23	31–19	27–33	30–28	26–23	18–20
RK Maribor Branik	20–21	30–23	39–17	25–25	25–28	30–24		39–33	35–27	27–26	31–25	28–28
RK Jeruzalem Ormož	17–19	28–27	33–22	28–33	30–26	31–31	31–23		33–23	22–31	32–21	28–24
RK Drava Ptuj	27–31	21–26	26–23	28–41	28–42	25–25	24–30	20–27		26–34	23–27	27–28
RD Riko Ribnica	32–28	36–26	34–25	28–29	31–26	24–23	34–31	32–28	42–31		34–25	27–24
RK Slovenj Gradec 2011	33–22	30–24	29–20	24–29	33–30	27–31	26–30	24–27	26–26	28–28		24–24
RK Trimo Trebnje	29–26	33–24	26–19	23–25	23–23	23–23	24–27	31–25	34–20	26–36	25–22	

Legend: Blue = home team win; Yellow = draw; Red = away team win.

== Championship Round ==
=== Standings ===
Pos	Team	Pld	W	D	L	GF	GA	GD	Pts	Qualification
1	RK Celje Pivovarna Laško	10	9	1	0	329	269	+60	57	EHF Champions League
2	RK Gorenje Velenje	10	6	1	3	274	248	+26	51	EHF Champions League
3	RD Riko Ribnica	10	6	1	3	285	272	+13	49	EHF Cup
4	RD Koper 2013	10	2	2	6	256	282	−26	44	EHF Cup
5	RD Urbanscape Loka	10	4	0	6	254	262	−8	37	
6	MRK Krka	10	0	1	9	267	332	−65	29	

Source: RZS

=== Results ===
Home \ Away	CEL	KOP	KRK	LOK	RIB	VEL
RK Celje Pivovarna Laško		37–32	41–29	28–22	35–27	29–28
RD Koper 2013	27–31		28–22	29–23	24–32	20–26
MRK Krka	26–38	27–27		26–27	30–33	23–35
RD Urbanscape Loka	25–36	26–21	35–27		23–25	24–16
RD Riko Ribnica	28–29	24–24	37–29	27–26		27–23
RK Gorenje Velenje	25–25	34–24	31–28	27–23	29–25	

Legend: Blue = home team win; Yellow = draw; Red = away team win.

== Relegation Round ==
=== Standings ===
Pos	Team	Pld	W	D	L	GF	GA	GD	Pts	Qualification
1	RK Maribor Branik	14	10	2	2	444	375	+69	48	
2	RK Trimo Trebnje	14	12	0	2	423	377	+46	47	
3	RK Jeruzalem Ormož	14	11	0	3	440	392	+48	45	
4	MRD Dobova	14	5	1	8	363	380	−17	34	
5	RK Slovenj Gradec 2011	14	6	2	6	390	380	+10	29	Relegation
6	RK Dol TKI Hrastnik	14	5	1	8	423	438	−15	26	Relegation
7	RK Drava Ptuj	14	1	1	12	377	437	−60	11	Relegation
8	RD Istrabenz Plini Izola	14	2	1	11	329	410	−81	5	Relegation

Source: RZS

=== Results ===
Home \ Away	DOB	DOL	IZO	MAR	ORM	PTU	SLO	TRE
MRD Dobova		30–26	23–17	29–34	32–28	25–23	23–26	24–26
RK Dol TKI Hrastnik	25–26		29–28	34–40	36–37	38–30	29–28	22–28
RD Istrabenz Plini Izola	26–26	27–31		18–35	22–36	29–27	25–29	26–30
RK Maribor Branik	32–25	35–27	31–15		33–26	28–28	35–34	25–26
RK Jeruzalem Ormož	34–25	35–30	32–28	32–28		32–23	26–22	33–28
RK Drava Ptuj	29–28	29–38	25–28	22–28	27–28		24–29	27–28
RK Slovenj Gradec 2011	29–25	25–25	26–23	28–28	26–30	36–30		30–33
RK Trimo Trebnje	25–22	40–33	30–17	31–32	32–31	42–34	24–22	

Legend: Blue = home team win; Yellow = draw; Red = away team win.
