= Darko Cingesar =

Slovenian handball player (born 1990)

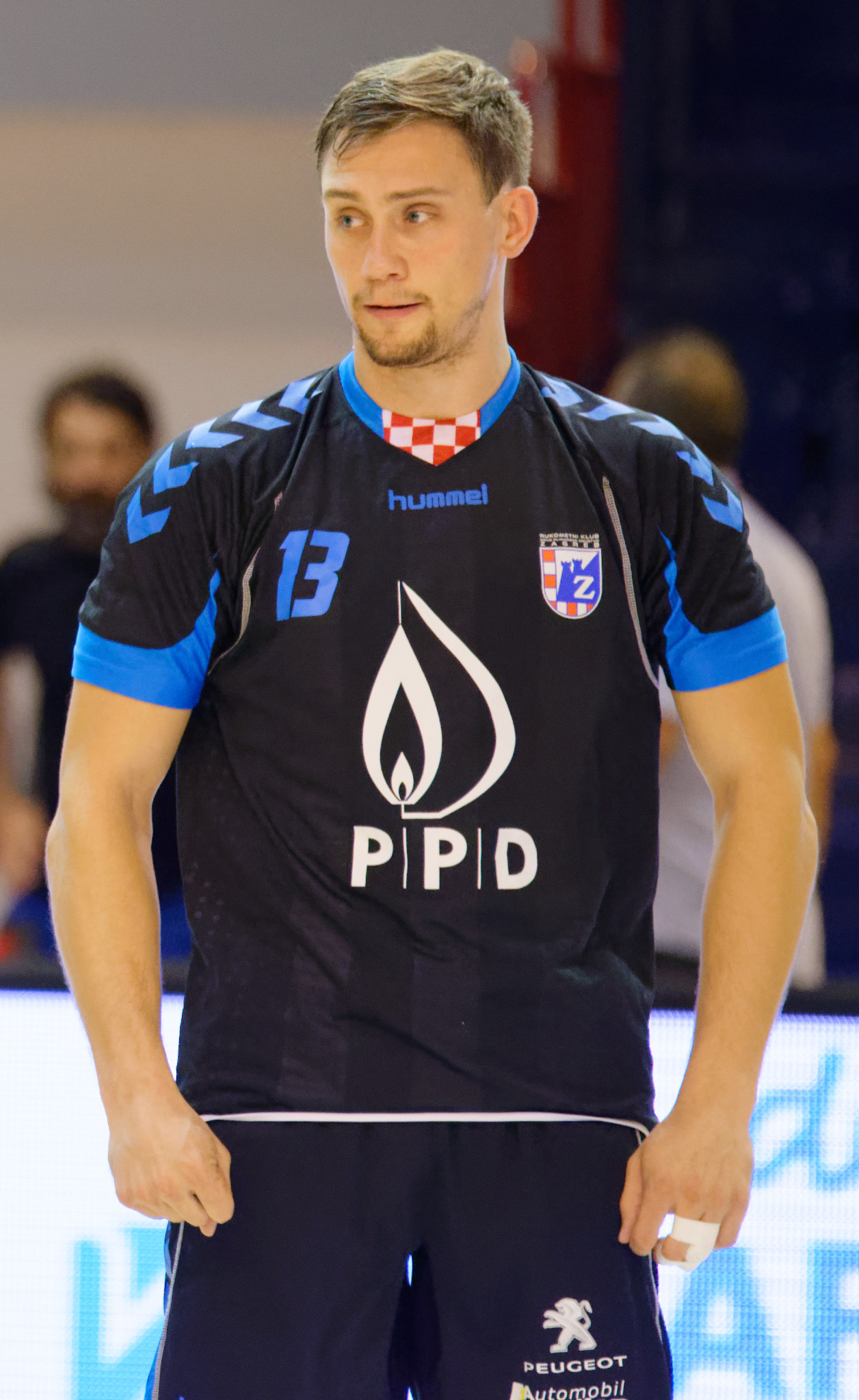

Personal information
- Nationality: Slovenian
- Born: 25 July 1990 (age 36) Ljubljana, SFR Yugoslavia
- Height: 1.87 m (6 ft 2 in)

Sport
- Sport: Handball
- Position: Left wing
- Current club: RK Trimo Trebnje
- Number: 51

Senior clubs
- Years: Team
- 2008–2011: RD Škofja Loka
- 2012: RK Jeruzalem Ormož
- 2012–2014: RK Gorenje Velenje
- 2014–2016: RK Maribor Branik
- 2016–2017: RK Zagreb
- 2017–2020: Pays d’Aix UC
- 2020–2021: RK Trimo Trebnje
- 2021–2023: RD Urbanscape Loka
- 2023–: RK Trimo Trebnje
National team
Years	Team	Apps	(Gls)
2013–	Slovenia	91	(152)
Medal record
World Championship
Bronze medal – third place	2017 France
- Updated on 29 January 2023

Darko Cingesar (born 25 July 1990) is a Slovenian handball player who plays for RK Trimo Trebnje and the Slovenia national team.

With Slovenia, he competed at the 2016 European Men's Handball Championship.
