= Staš Slatinek Jovičić =

Slovenian handball player

Personal information
- Nationality: Slovenian
- Born: 6 December 2000 (age 25) Slovenj Gradec, Slovenia
- Height: 188 cm (74 in)

Sport
- Sport: Handball
- Position: Left wing
- Current club: RD Slovan
- Number: 3

Youth career
- Years: Team
- 2009–2013: RK Cimos Koper
- 2013–2016: RD Koper

Senior clubs
- Years: Team
- 2016–2017: RD Koper
- 2017–2020: RD Slovan
- 2020–2021: RD Koper
- 2021–2024: RK Trimo Trebnje
- 2024–: RD Slovan
National team
| Years | Team | Apps | (Gls) |
| 2022– | Slovenia | 49 | (105) |
- Updated on 14 January 2026

Staš Slatinek Jovičić (born 6 December 2000) is a Slovenian handball player. He competed at the 2024 Olympics and currently plays for RD Slovan.

== Club career ==
Jovičić began his youth career at RK Cimos Koper before continuing his development at RD Koper. He made his senior debut for RD Koper in the Slovenian First League during the 2016–17 season.

He later played for RD Slovan (2017–2020) before returning to RD Koper for the 2020–21 season. In 2021, he signed with RK Trimo Trebnje. After three seasons with Trebnje, he rejoined RD Slovan in 2024. With Slovan, he won the Slovenian national championship in 2025.

== International career ==
Jovičić has represented Slovenia in several major international tournaments. He participated in the 2022 Mediterranean Games; however, Slovenia withdrew from the tournament after two matches due to multiple COVID-19 cases.

At the 2023 World Men's Handball Championship, Slovenia finished in tenth place, with Jovičić appearing in one match squad.

He then competed at the 2024 European Men's Handball Championship, where Slovenia placed sixth.

He represented Slovenia at the 2024 Summer Olympics.

At the 2025 World Men's Handball Championship, he scored 13 goals in six matches, helping Slovenia to a 13th-place finish.

== Personal life ==
His father, Zoran Jovičić, is a former Slovenian international handball player.
