= RK Maribor Branik =

Slovenian handball club

- Full name: Rokometni klub Maribor Branik
- Nickname: Vijoličasti (The Purples)
- Founded: 2003; 23 years ago (as MRD Maribor Branik)
- Arena: Lukna Sports Hall
- Capacity: 2,100
- President: Mihael Pisanec
- Head coach: Kristijan Ladič
- League: 1. B SRL
- 2025–26: 2. SRL, 1st of 12 (promoted)
- Club colours
Home	Away

Rokometni klub Maribor Branik (English: Maribor Branik Handball Club), commonly referred to as RK Maribor Branik or simply Branik, is a handball club from Maribor, Slovenia. As of the 2026–27 season, the club competes in the 1. B SRL, the second tier of Slovenian handball. They play their home games at Lukna Sports Hall, a 2,100-capacity multi-purpose sports venue in Maribor. Between 2004 and 2010, the team was known as RK Klima Petek Maribor due to sponsorship reasons. Their biggest success is reaching the final of the Slovenian Handball Cup twice and reaching the quarter-finals of the EHF Cup in the 2012–13 season.

== History ==
=== Handball in Maribor ===
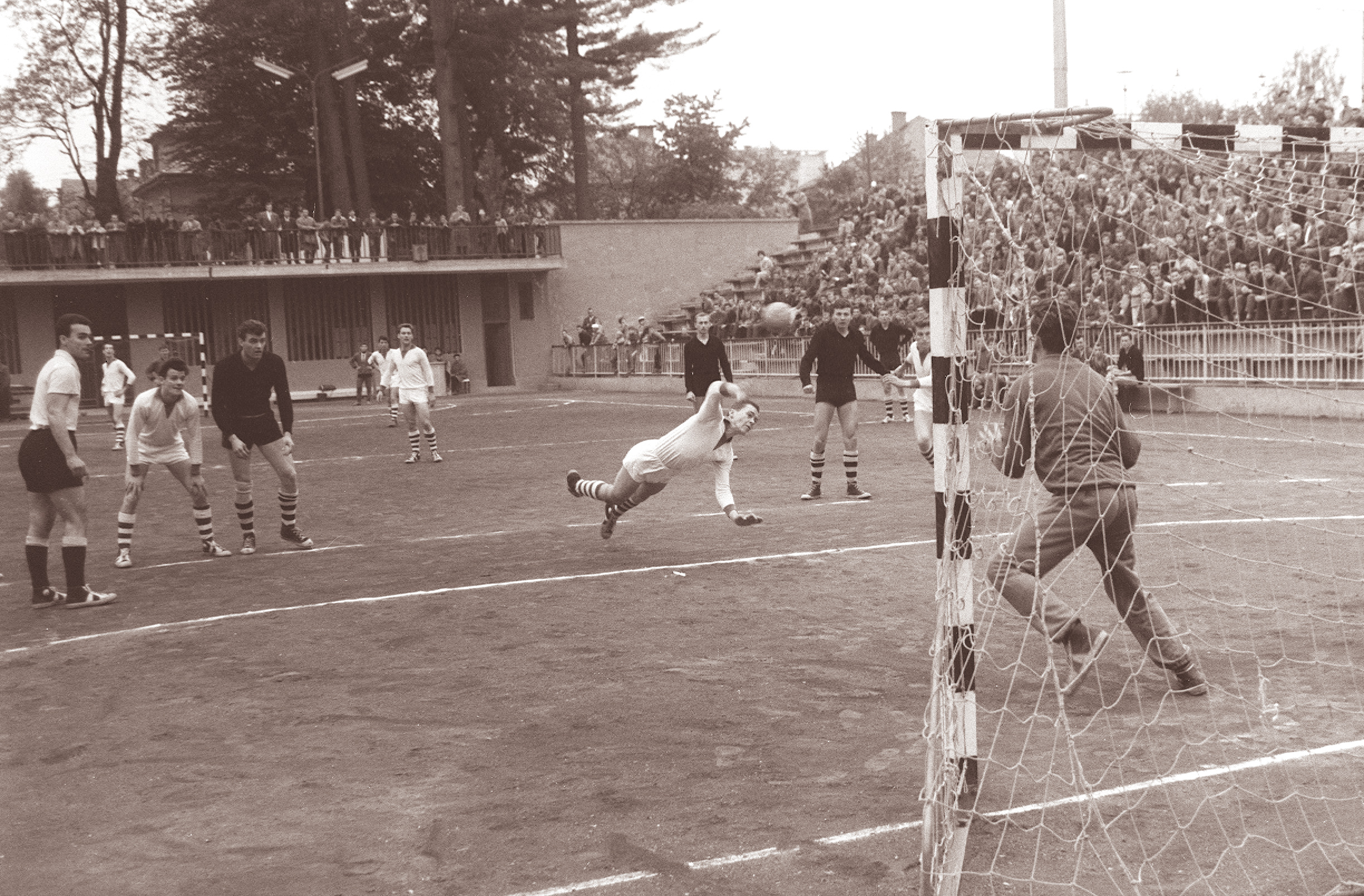
A match between Branik and Rudar in 1961

The first handball team in Maribor was formed in 1925, when the women's section of the 1. SSK MB played their first Czech handball match at the Ljudski vrt area. The first men's handball team, named Polet, was formed in 1949. They renamed as Branik in 1951, when they participated in the Yugoslav First League qualifiers. In 1954, Branik won their first Slovenian Republic League title, and were promoted to the Yugoslav First League. Between 1955 and 1968, Branik did not achieve any major success and were even relegated to the local Styrian League in 1966, but returned to the top Slovenian division two years later. They were relegated again in 1972, but once again returned in 1979 after spending a few years in the local regional leagues. In 1977, the team merged with Kovinar Tezno to form Maribor. The team was struggling in the next decade and did not achieve any major results. After Slovenia's independence in 1991, the team was reformed with a help from some former handball players, including Marko Šibila, and reached the Third National Handball League (3. DRL).

=== Maribor Branik ===
In 2003, a new club called Maribor Branik was founded. In their first season, the team was promoted to the 2. DRL East. In 2005–06, they were promoted to the 1. B DRL, where they stayed until the 2008–09 season, when the team was promoted to the top tier Slovenian First League of Handball. In the same year, they also finished third in the Slovenian Handball Cup. In their first season in the top division, they finished eighth and were runners-up of the Slovenian Handball Cup, where they lost to Celje in the final. As runners-up, they gained a place in the 2010–11 EHF Cup Winners' Cup. They reached the quarter-finals, where they lost to the Spanish side San Antonio. In the same season, Branik finished fifth in the league. They again finished fifth in the 2011–12 season, and were eliminated in the quarter-finals of the 2011–12 EHF Challenge Cup by Maccabi Tel Aviv from Israel. The most successful international season for the club was in 2012–13, when they reached the group stages of the EHF Cup, defeating Dudelange, Kópavogs and Siscia in the qualifications. They were drawn in the group with Danish team Tvis Holstebro, Norwegian Elverum and Polish Wisła Płock. With seven points out of six games, Maribor Branik qualified to the quarter-finals of the competition, where they were eliminated by Göppingen with 57–56 on aggregate. In 2013–14 and 2014–15, the club finished third in the Slovenian League, which is their best result since the establishment. The club was about to enter the regional SEHA League alongside Celje and Gorenje in the 2014–15 season, but all three Slovenian clubs refused entry due to unacceptable financial requirements. In the 2016–17 season, Maribor Branik reached the final of the Slovenian Cup for the second time in its history, where they lost to Celje 36–28.

== Arena ==
Until 2025, Maribor Branik played its home games at the 3,261-capacity Tabor Hall in the Tabor District of Maribor, with some matches also being played at the club's secondary venue, the Lukna Sports Hall, which can accommodate 2,100 spectators. In early 2025, however, the club permanently moved to the Lukna Sports Hall.

== Supporters and rivalries ==
Kristijan Petek, the former president of the club, was the first to organize a fan group which would support the team at home matches. As he was also the owner of the air conditioning company Klima Petek, which was the main sponsor of the club, the fan group consisted mostly of company employees. In 2010, when Andrej Bauman has been appointed a new director of Maribor Branik, the club gained a new group of fans, named Maribor Supporters, which supposedly consisted of the younger members of Viole Maribor, the supporters of football club NK Maribor.

In February 2012, Maribor Supporters chanted a song about the Srebrenica massacre against the Bosnian team Gradačac during the 2011–12 EHF Challenge Cup match. The match was temporarily suspended, and the incident received wide coverage in the Slovenian and Bosnian media. The group was banned by Maribor Branik from attending any home matches, and a police investigation was ordered.

Maribor Branik do not have any major rivals; however, matches between Maribor Branik and RK Celje are dubbed as the Styrian derby (Slovene: Štajerski derbi), named after Styria, with Maribor and Celje being the two largest cities in the region. Matches between Maribor Branik and RK Jeruzalem Ormož are also called Styrian derby or Neighbourhood derby (Slovene: Sosedski derbi).

== Colours, kits and crest ==
During the club's first years, the kit colours were blue, white and black, with the last two also being the traditional colours of the Branik Sports Association. Before the start of the 2011–12 season, Maribor Branik changed its main colour to purple due to the popularity of NK Maribor, the most successful football club in Slovenia, which plays in purple jerseys. A decade later, ahead of the 2021–22 season, the club reverted to white kits for home games and black kits for away games. The club crest is in the form of a shield with a stylized minimalist silhouette of a handball player. In 2012, the colours of the crest were changed from black and white to purple and white.

== Season-by-season records ==
Season	Division	League	Pos.	Cup	Supercup	European competition	Head coach
2003–04	4	3. League	3↑	—	—	—	
2004–05	3	2. National League	13	Round of 32	—	—	Sebastijan Kovačič; Milan Šimac
2005–06	3	2. National League	2↑	—	—	—	Milan Šimac; Kristjan Ladič
2006–07	2	1. B League	5	Round of 32	—	—	Sebastjan Oblak; Primož Hoenigmann
2007–08	2	1. B League	3	Round of 16	—	—	Sebastjan Oblak
2008–09	2	1. B League	2↑	Third place	—	—	Bojan Čotar
2009–10	1	First League	8	Runners-up	—	—	Bojan Čotar
2010–11	1	First League	5	Round of 16	Runners-up	EHF Cup Winners' Cup; Quarterfinals	Marko Šibila
2011–12	1	First League	5	Fourth place	—	EHF Challenge Cup; Quarterfinals	Marko Šibila
2012–13	1	First League	4	Quarterfinals	—	EHF Cup; Quarterfinals	Marko Šibila
2013–14	1	First League	3	Round of 32	—	EHF Cup; Round 3	Marko Šibila
2014–15	1	First League	3	Round of 32	—	EHF Cup; Round 2	Marko Šibila; Boris Denič
2015–16	1	First League	5	Quarterfinals	—	EHF Cup; Round 3	Boris Denič; Slavko Ivezič
2016–17	1	First League	7	Runners-up	—	—	Slavko Ivezič; Sebastjan Sovič
2017–18	1	First League	7	Quarterfinals	Runners-up	—	Marko Šibila
2018–19	1	First League	4	Round of 16	—	—	Marko Šibila
2019–20	1	First League	11 (Note: The league season was finished early due to the COVID-19 pandemic. The cup competition was cancelled before the quarterfinals.)	Quarterfinals	—	EHF Challenge Cup; Round 3	Marko Šibila; Davor Rokavec
2020–21	1	First League	9	Not held	—	—	Siniša Markota
2021–22	1	First League	8	Round of 32	—	—	Luka Žvižej
2022–23	1	First League	13↓	Quarterfinals	—	—	Luka Žvižej
2023–24	3	2. National League	4	Round of 16	—	—	Kristijan Ladič
2024–25	3	2. National League	7	Round of 32	—	—	Kristijan Ladič
2025–26	3	2. National League	1↑	Round of 32	—	—	Kristijan Ladič

Notes

Key

Promoted ↑	Relegated ↓

== Maribor Branik in European handball ==
The table includes matches from the official European Handball Federation competitions only. All results (home and away) list Branik's goal tally first.

Competitions

- QR2 = Second qualification round
- QR3 = Third qualification round
- R1 = First round
- R2 = Second round
- R3 = Third round
- L16 = Last 16
- QF = Quarter-final
- G = Group stage

Matches

- Pld = Number of matches played
- W = Matches won
- D = Matches drawn
- L = Matches lost
- Win% = Winning percentage

Season	Competition	Round	Opponent	Home	Away	Aggregate
2010–11	EHF Cup Winners' Cup	R3	(Czech Republic) Karviná	28–22	33–28	61–50
2010–11	EHF Cup Winners' Cup	L16	(Serbia) Kolubara	32–27	40–26	72–53
2010–11	EHF Cup Winners' Cup	QF	(Spain) Amaya Sport San Antonio	28–34	27–35	55–69
2011–12	EHF Challenge Cup	R3	(Serbia) Radnički Kragujevac	26–22	23–27	49–49 (a)
2011–12	EHF Challenge Cup	L16	(Bosnia and Herzegovina) Gradačac	30–22	26–31	56–53
2011–12	EHF Challenge Cup	QF	(Israel) Maccabi Tel Aviv	29–28	29–31	58–59
2012–13	EHF Cup	R1	(Luxembourg) Dudelange	39–24	27–28	66–52
2012–13	EHF Cup	R2	(Iceland) Kópavogs	35–25	42–25	77–50 (Note: Both matches were played in Maribor, Slovenia, with "home" and "away" being used for administrative purposes.)
2012–13	EHF Cup	R3	(Croatia) Siscia	35–22	29–30	64–52
2012–13	EHF Cup	G	(Denmark) Tvis Holstebro	31–27	26–26	Second place (Group C)
2012–13	EHF Cup	G	(Norway) Elverum	34–29	27–30	Second place (Group C)
2012–13	EHF Cup	G	(Poland) Wisła Płock	26–23	26–30	Second place (Group C)
2012–13	EHF Cup	QF	(Germany) Göppingen	26–26	30–31	56–57
2013–14	EHF Cup	QR2	(Austria) Bregenz	37–23	25–26	62–49
2013–14	EHF Cup	QR3	(Slovakia) Tatran Prešov	30–28	26–34	56–62
2014–15	EHF Cup	QR2	(Sweden) Kristianstad	26–25	24–36	50–61
2015–16	EHF Cup	QR3	(Romania) Dinamo București	27–26	25–31	52–57
2019–20	EHF Challenge Cup	R2	(Faroe Islands) H71	31–24	24–25	55–49 (Note: Both matches were played in Tórshavn, Faroe Islands, with "home" and "away" being used for administrative purposes.)
2019–20	EHF Challenge Cup	R3	(Portugal) Madeira Andebol SAD	20–23	23–31	43–54 (Note: Both matches were played in Funchal, Portugal, with "home" and "away" being used for administrative purposes.)

=== By competition ===
EHF competitions
Competition	Pld	W	D	L	Win%	Last season played
EHF Cup	22	11	2	9	50.00	2015–16
EHF Cup Winners' Cup	6	4	0	2	66.67	2010–11
EHF Challenge Cup	10	4	0	6	40.00	2019–20
Total	38	19	2	17	50.00	—N/a

== Honours ==
League

- Slovenian Championship

Third place: 2013–14, 2014–15

- Slovenian Second Division

Runners-up: 2008–09

- Slovenian Third Division

Winners: 2025–26
Runners-up: 2005–06

Cup

- Slovenian Cup

Runners-up: 2009–10, 2016–17
Semi-finalist: 2008–09, 2011–12

- Slovenian Supercup

Runners-up: 2010, 2017

== International players ==
The following Maribor Branik players have made at least one appearance for their senior national team.

Bosnia and Herzegovina

- Duško Čelica
- Dejan Malinović
- Marko Tarabochia

Croatia

- Damir Batinović
- Goran Bogunović
- Ante Kaleb
- Zvonimir Kapular
- Marino Marić
- Ivan Pešić
- Mario Šoštarić (Note: Also played for Slovenia before switching his national team allegiance to Croatia.)
- Nikola Špelić

Estonia

- Andris Celminš

Macedonia

- Renato Vugrinec (Note: Also played for Slovenia before switching his national team allegiance to Macedonia.)

Montenegro

- Mile Mijušković

Serbia

- Milan Mirković

Slovenia

- Darko Cingesar
- Dragan Gajić
- Rok Ivančič
- Mitja Janc
- Urh Kastelic
- Tilen Kodrin
- Vid Levc
- Gregor Lorger
- Borut Mačkovšek
- Niko Medved
- Matjaž Mlakar
- Žiga Mlakar
- Gregor Ocvirk
- Marko Oštir
- Simon Razgor
- Aleksander Špende
- Aljoša Štefanič
- Matic Verdinek
- Jure Vran
- Miha Zarabec
- Dani Zugan
- Igor Žabić
- Stefan Žabić
- Luka Žvižej
