= Jan Grebenc =

Slovenian handball player

Personal information
- Nationality: Slovenian
- Born: 18 August 1992 (age 34) Ljubljana, Slovenia
- Height: 1.94 m (6 ft 4 in)

Sport
- Sport: Handball
- Position: Left back
- Current club: RD Slovan
- Number: 28

Senior clubs
- Years: Team
- –2017: RD Riko Ribnica
- 2017–2018: RK Gorenje Velenje
- 2018–2019: Skjern Håndbold
- 2019–2021: RK Celje
- 2021–2022: GWD Minden
- 2022–2024: RD Riko Ribnica
- 2024–: RD Slovan
National team
Years	Team	Apps	(Gls)
2016–	Slovenia	17	(26)
Medal record
World Championship
Bronze medal – third place	2017 France

Jan Grebenc (born 18 August 1992) is a Slovenian handball player who plays for RD Slovan and the Slovenian national handball team.

== Club ==
In 2017 he left RD Riko Ribnica and signed RK Gorenje Velenje. In Velenje he played for the first time in the Champions League. In the last game against Kadetten Schaffhausen on 25 November 2017 he got injured and had to pause for a long time. In 2018 he went to Dänmark and played for Skjern Håndbold. In 2019 he left because he hadn't a lot of playing time. He went back to his home country and played for RK Celje. For the 2021–22 he signed a contract with the German club GWD Minden. Since 2022 he plays again for RD Riko Ribnica.

== National team ==
He participated at the 2017 World Men's Handball Championship, where Slovenia won bronze medals, the country's best result at a World Championship. He missed the Preliminary round because of an illness. This was Slovenias second ever medals and first since 2004.
