= Milan Mirković =

Serbian handball player (born 1985)

Personal information
- Full name: Milan Mirković
- Nationality: Serbian
- Born: 7 April 1985 (age 41) Novi Sad, SFR Yugoslavia
- Height: 1.93 m (6 ft 4 in)

Sport
- Sport: Handball
- Position: Right back
- Current club: Vojvodina
- Number: 6

Youth career
- Years: Team
- –: Sintelon

Senior clubs
- Years: Team
- 2003–2008: Sintelon
- 2008–2009: Koper
- 2009–2010: MKB Veszprém
- 2010–2011: Koper
- 2011–2013: Maribor Branik
- 2013–2014: Vojvodina
- 2014–2016: Maccabi Tel Aviv
- 2016–2017: Ramat HaSharon
- 2017–2018: Dinamo Pančevo
- 2018–: Vojvodina
National team
- Years: Team
- –: Serbia

Milan Mirković (Serbian Cyrillic: Милан Мирковић; born 7 April 1985) is a Serbian handball player for Vojvodina.

== Career ==
After playing for five years with Sintelon (later known as Tarkett), Mirković moved to Slovenia and joined Koper in October 2008. He helped the club win the Slovenian Cup in April 2009. After spending one year with MKB Veszprém in Hungary, Mirković returned to Koper in the 2010–11 season, winning the Slovenian First League and EHF Challenge Cup. He subsequently played for two years with fellow Slovenian team Maribor Branik. After returning to Serbia and winning the championship with Vojvodina in the 2013–14 season, Mirković moved to Israel and joined Maccabi Tel Aviv. He signed with fellow Israeli team Ramat HaSharon in July 2016.

== Honours ==
Koper

- Slovenian First League: 2010–11
- Slovenian Cup: 2008–09, 2010–11
- EHF Challenge Cup: 2010–11

MKB Veszprém

- Nemzeti Bajnokság I: 2009–10
- Magyar Kupa: 2009–10

Vojvodina

- Serbian Handball Super League: 2013–14, 2018–19
- Serbian Handball Cup: 2018–19
- Serbian Handball Super Cup: 2013, 2018, 2019
