= Branko Bedekovič =

Slovenian handball player

Personal information
- Nationality: Slovenian
- Born: 14 March 1973 (age 53) Celje, Yugoslavia
- Height: 199 cm (78 in)

Sport
- Sport: Handball
- Position: Line player

Youth career
- Years: Team
- 1987-1991: RK Razkrižje
- 1991-1992: RK Pomurka Bakovci

Senior clubs
- Years: Team
- 1992-1996: RK Pomurka Bakovci
- 1996-1999: RK Velenje
- 1999-2002: RK Celje
- 2002-2007: RK Velenje
- 2007-2008: RK Zagreb
- 2008-2010: RK Celje
- 2010-2014: HC Kelag Kärnten
- 2014-2015: HIB Handball Graz
National team
| Years | Team | Apps | (Gls) |
| – | Slovenia | 74 | (112) |
Medal record
European Championship
| Silver medal – second place | 2004 Slovenia |

Branko Bedekovič (born 14 March 1973) is a Slovenian former handball player and current sporting director at RK Maribor. He won silver medals at the 2004 European Championship at home soil, which is Slovenia's best result ever. He also competed in the men's tournament at the 2000 Summer Olympics.

== Playing career ==
He started playing handball aged 14 at RK Razkrižje and joined RK Pomurka Bakovci four years later, where he made his senior debut. From 1996 he joined RK Velenje. In 1999 he joined Slovenian top club RK Celje, where he won the 1999-2000 and 2000-01 Slovenian championships and cups. After three years he returned to RK Velenje.

In 2007 he joined Croatian RK Zagreb, where he won the Croatian championship in 2007-08. The season after he returned to RK Celje.

In 2010 he joined Austrian team HC Kelag Kärnten. He initially retired after the 2012-13 season, but returned to the court in 2014. In the 2014-15 season he played for Austrian HIB Handball Graz, after which he retired.

In 2018 he became the sporting director at RK Maribor.
