= Slovenian Second League (men's handball) =

1. B SRL
- Founded: 1991; 35 years ago
- No. of teams: 12
- Country: Slovenia
- Confederation: EHF
- Most recent champion: Ajdovščina (2025–26)
- Level on pyramid: 2
- Promotion to: 1. SRL
- Relegation to: 2. SRL
- Website: Official website

The Slovenian Second League of Handball, also known as the 1. B SRL, is the second level handball league in Slovenia. It is governed by the Handball Federation of Slovenia. As of the 2026–27 season, the league consists of 12 teams.

== Clubs ==
As of the 2026–27 season

- Dobova
- Dol Hrastnik
- Drava Ptuj
- DRŠ Sebastjana Soviča
- Grosuplje
- Koper
- Krško
- Ljubljana
- Maribor Branik
- Mokerc-Ig
- Radovljica
- Šmartno

== List of seasons ==
Season	Champions	Runners-up	Third place
1991–92	Celje B	Dobova	Šešir
1992–96	Not played (East/West system)		
1996–97	Škofljica	Ribnica	Šešir
1997–98	Radeče	Šešir	Velika Nedelja
1998–99	Ribnica	Velika Nedelja	Sevnica
1999–00	Rudar Trbovlje	Velika Nedelja	Sevnica
2000–01	Sevnica	Izola	Nova Gorica
2001–02	Pivka	Cimos Koper	Nova Gorica
2002–03	Ormož	Novoles	Kranj
2003–04	Gold Club	SVIŠ	Slovan
2004–05	Ribnica	Slovan	Gorišnica
2005–06	SVIŠ	Velika Nedelja	Dobova
2006–07	Termo	Nova Gorica	Krško
2007–08	Ribnica	Krka	Maribor
2008–09	Krško	Maribor	Šmartno 99
2009–10	Krka	Šmartno 99	Ajdovščina
2010–11	Krško	Izola	SVIŠ
2011–12	SVIŠ	Sevnica	Celje B
2012–13	Slovan	Šmartno	Dol Hrastnik
2013–14	Sl. Gradec 2011	Loka 2012	Dobova
2014–15	Koper 2013	Dobova	Šmartno
2015–16	Dol Hrastnik	Drava Ptuj	Krim-Olimpija
2016–17	Šmartno	Slovan	Krško
2017–18	SVIŠ	Dol Hrastnik	Škofljica
2018–19	Sl. Gradec 2011	Izola	Slovan
2019–20 (Note: The season was not completed due to the COVID-19 pandemic.)	Slovan	Ljubljana	Mokerc-Ig
2020–21	Šmartno	SVIŠ	Krško
2021–22	Krško	Krka	Izola
2022–23	Škofljica	Ljubljana	Grosuplje
2023–24	Krško	Radovljica	Šmartno
2024–25	Škofljica	Radovljica	Ajdovščina
2025–26	Ajdovščina	Mokerc-Ig	Koper
