= David Miklavčič =

Slovenian handball player

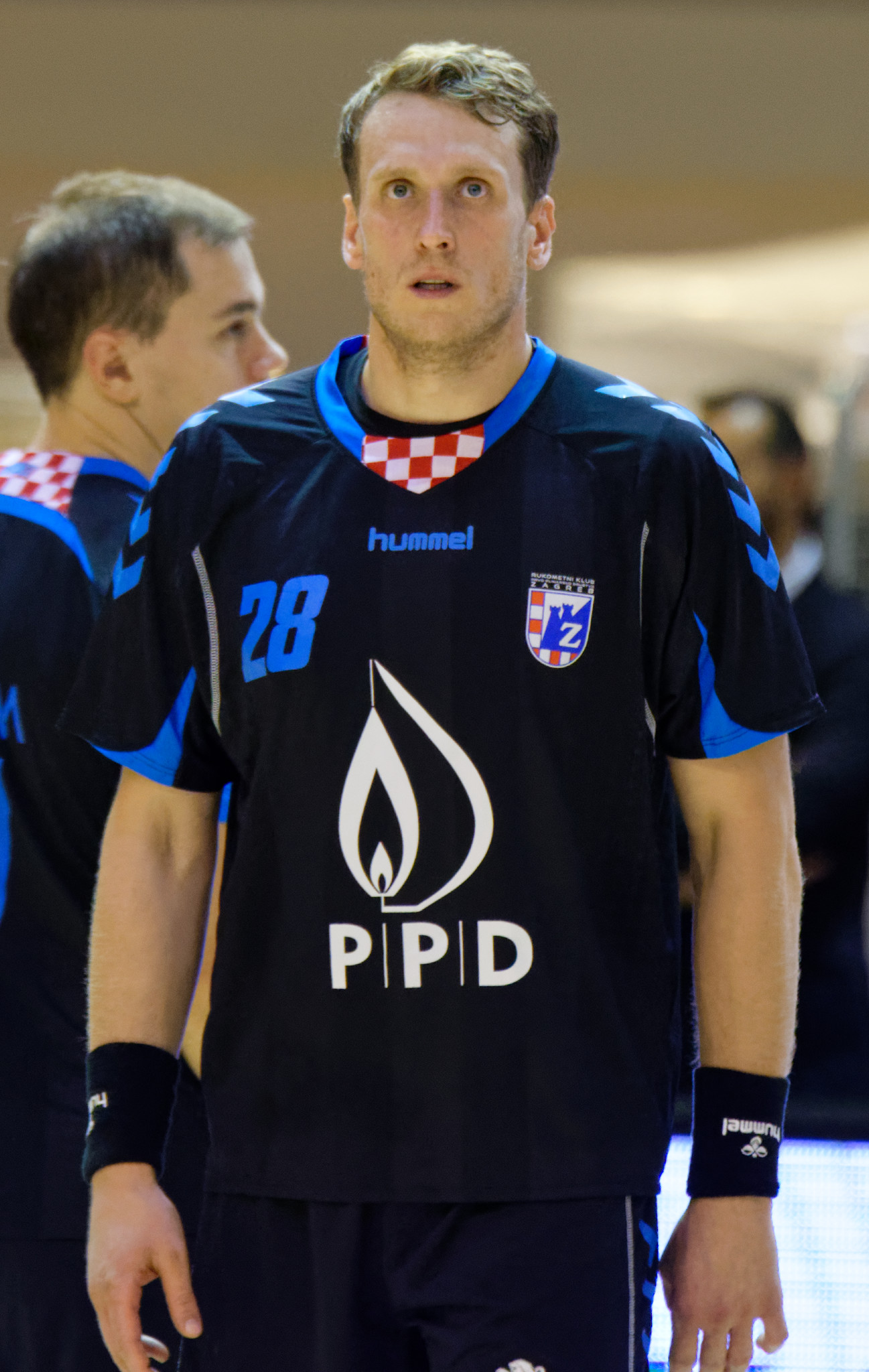

Personal information
- Nationality: Slovenian
- Born: 29 January 1983 (age 43) Ljubljana, SFR Yugoslavia
- Height: 1.96 m (6 ft 5 in)

Sport
- Sport: Handball
- Position: Right back
- Number: 18

Senior clubs
- Years: Team
- 1999-2004: RK Grosuplje
- 2004-2010: RK Trimo Trebnje
- 2010-2013: RK Gorenje Velenje
- 2013-2014: HC Dinamo Minsk
- 2014-2015: RK Celje Pivovarna Laško
- 2015-2016: Tremblay-en-France
- 2016-2018: RK Zagreb
- 2018-2022: RK Gorenje Velenje
National team
Years	Team	Apps	(Gls)
–	Slovenia	107	(149)
Medal record
World Championship
Bronze medal – third place	2017 France

David Miklavčič (born 29 January 1983) is a former Slovenian handball player. He played for the Slovenian national team.

At the 2017 World Championship he won a bronze medal, which is Slovenias best ever result at a World Championship. He also competed at the 2016 European Championship and the 2016 Olympics.
