= Aljoša Štefanič =

Slovenian handball player (born 1982)

Aljoša Štefanič (born 2 February 1982 in Slovenj Gradec) is a Slovenian professional handball player.

== Career ==
Štefanič played for Gorenje Velenje, Gorišnica, Jeruzalem Ormož, Gold Club, and Maribor Branik.
