= Simon Razgor =

Slovenian handball player

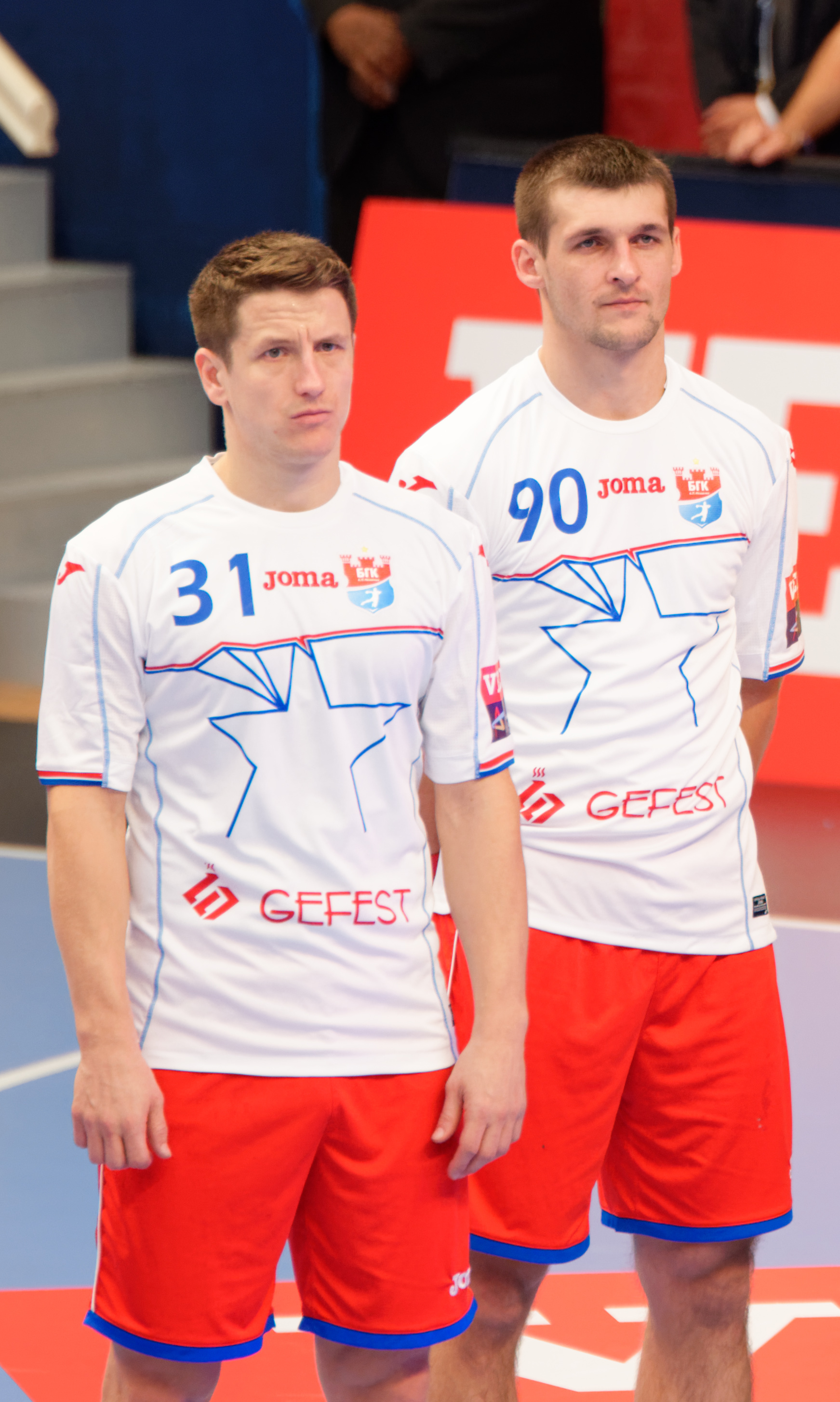
- Simon Razgor (left) in 2017

Personal information
- Nationality: Slovenian
- Born: 18 September 1985 (age 41) Celje, SFR Yugoslavia
- Height: 1.83 m (6 ft 0 in)

Sport
- Sport: Handball
- Position: Left wing

Senior clubs
- Years: Team
- 2004–2007: RK Celje
- 2007–2014: RK Maribor Branik
- 2014–2021: HC Meshkov Brest
- 2021–2023: RK Maribor Branik
National team
Years	Team	Apps	(Gls)
–	Slovenia	47	(108)

Simon Razgor (born 18 September 1985) is a Slovenian former handball player.

With Slovenia, he participated at the 2016 Summer Olympics in Rio de Janeiro.
