= Sebastjan Sovič =

Slovenian handball player

Personal information
- Nationality: Slovenian
- Born: February 26, 1976 (age 50) Slovenj Gradec, SR Slovenia, Yugoslavia
- Height: 1.81 m (5 ft 11 1/2 in)

Sport
- Sport: Handball
- Position: Left wing
- Current club: RK Gorenje

Sebastjan Sovič (born 26 February 1976) is a retired professional handball player. Most of his career he played for RK Gorenje where he was the team's captain After leaving RK Gorenje he became head coach of RK Slovenj Gradec since 2009.
