= Matjaž Mlakar =

Slovenian handball player

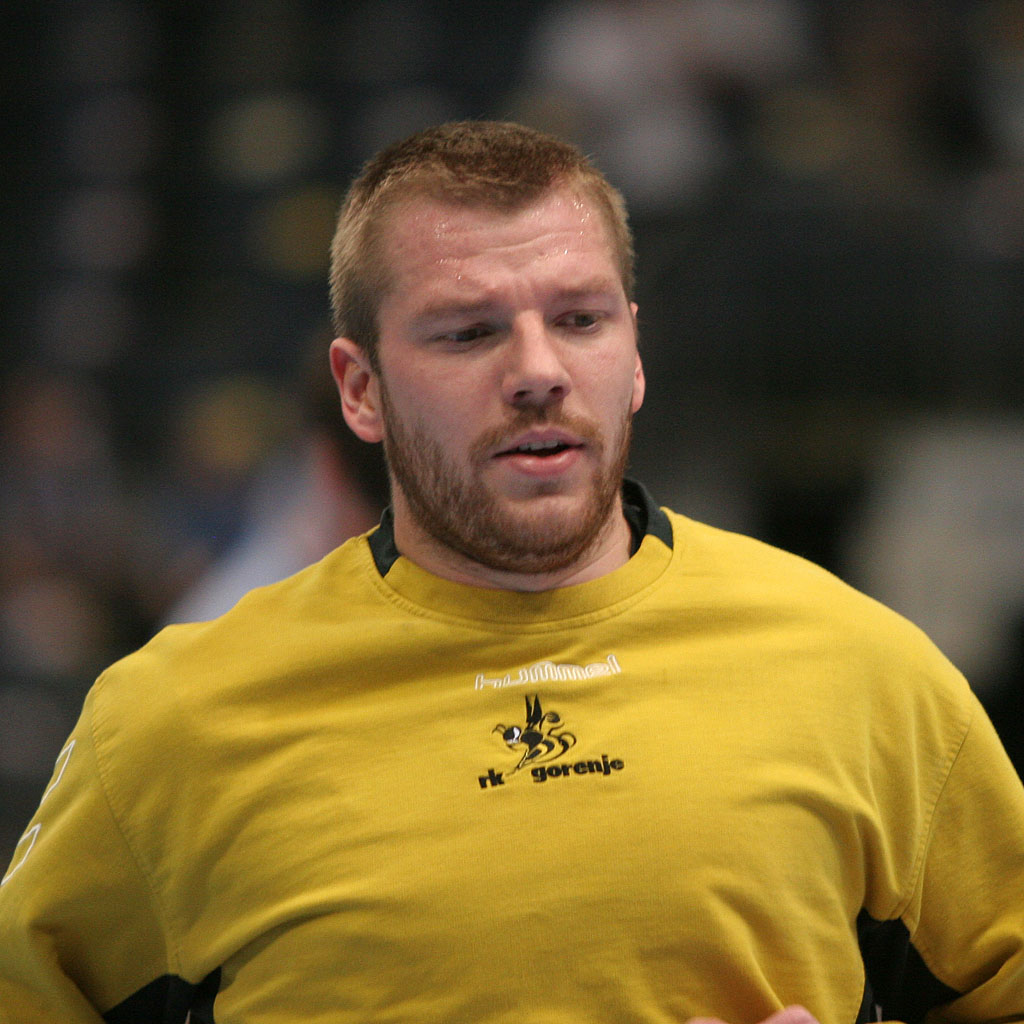
Matjaž Mlakar

Matjaž Mlakar (born 23 December 1981 in Sevnica) is a Slovenian professional handball player.

== Information ==
- Height: 189 cm
- Weight: 103 kg
- Position: Pivot

== Career ==
- Clubs: Sevnica, Gorenje, Celje, Maribor Branik, Tatran Prešov.
