= Handball Federation of Slovenia =

Governing body for handball in Slovenia

Handball Federation of Slovenia Slovene: Rokometna zveza Slovenije RZS
- IOC nation: Republic of Slovenia (SLO)
- Sport: Handball
- Official website: www.rokometna-zveza.si/si/

History
- Year of formation: 11 December 1949; 76 years ago

Affiliations
- International federation: International Handball Federation (IHF)
- IHF member since: 1992; 34 years ago
- Continental association: European Handball Federation
- National Olympic Committee: Olympic Committee of Slovenia
- Other affiliation(s): Mediterranean Handball Confederation

Governing Body
- President: dr. Bor Rozman

Headquarters
- Address: Ljubljana
- Country: Slovenia
- Secretary General: Miha Pantelič

The Handball Federation of Slovenia (RZS) (Slovene: Rokometna zveza Slovenije) is the national authority responsible for the administration of handball in Slovenia, the Slovenia men's national handball team and the Slovenia women's national handball team. It is a member of the European Handball Federation (EHF) and the International Handball Federation (IHF).

It organizes the following competitions:

- Slovenian First League (men's handball)
- Slovenian Second League (men's handball)
- Slovenian Handball Cup
- Slovenian Handball Supercup
- Slovenian First League (women's handball)
