= Matic Verdinek =

Slovenian handball player

Personal information
- Nationality: Slovenian
- Born: 13 April 1994 (age 32) Celje, Slovenia
- Height: 1.88 m (6 ft 2 in)

Sport
- Sport: Handball
- Position: Left wing
- Current club: RK Gorenje Velenje
- Number: 25

Youth career
- Years: Team
- –: RK Celje

Senior clubs
- Years: Team
- –2013: RK Celje
- 2013–2017: RK Maribor Branik
- 2017–: RK Gorenje Velenje
National team
Years	Team	Apps	(Gls)
2017–	Slovenia	21	(39)

Matic Verdinek (born 13 April 1994) is a Slovenian handball player for RK Gorenje Velenje and the Slovenian national team.

He represented Slovenia at the 2018 European Men's Handball Championship.
