= Balatonfüredi KSE in European handball =

Balatonfüredi KSE is a Hungarian handball club, based in Balatonfüred, Hungary.

== European record ==
As of 23 November 2025:

| Competition | Seasons | Year(s) in the competition |
|---|---|---|
| EHF European League (EHF Cup) | 10x | 2011/12, 2012/13, 2014/15, 2016/17, 2017/18, 2018/19, 2019/20, 2020/21, 2021/22 |
| EHF European Cup (City Cup), (Challenge Cup) | 1x | 2025/26 |
| EHF Cup Winners' Cup (defunct) | 1x | 2010/11 |
| Source: kézitörténelem.hu | 12 seasons | |

== Matches ==
Balatonfüred score listed first. As of 22 February 2026.

| Season | Competition | Round | Club | Home | Away | Aggregate |
|---|---|---|---|---|---|---|
| 2010–11 | Cup Winners' Cup | Third round | (Moldova) HC Olimpus-85-USEFS | 27-16 | 28-19 | 55–35 |
| 2010–11 | Cup Winners' Cup | Round of 16 | Tremblay en France | 20-20 | 27-29 | 47–49 |
| 2011–12 | EHF Cup | Second round | (Luxembourg) HC Berchem | 25-23 | 31-23 | 56–46 |
| 2011–12 | EHF Cup | Third round | (France) Dunkerque HB Grand Littoral | 27-26 | 21-31 | 48–56 |
| 2012–13 | EHF Cup | First round | (Estonia) HC Kehra | 24-25 | 27-22 | 51–47 |
| 2012–13 | EHF Cup | Second round | (Serbia) RK Vojvodina | 27-24 | 25-29 | 52–53 |
| 2014–15 | EHF Cup | Second qualifying round | (Russia) Dinamo Astrakhan | 21-23 | 25-20 | 46–43 |
| 2014–15 | EHF Cup | Third qualifying round | (Austria) Alpla HC Hard | 26-18 | 26-31 | 52–49 |
| 2014–15 | EHF Cup | Group stage (Group D) | (Germany) MT Melsungen | 24-30 | 23-29 | 4th |
| 2014–15 | EHF Cup | Group stage (Group D) | (Sweden) Eskilstuna Guif | 23-26 | 24-24 | 4th |
| 2014–15 | EHF Cup | Group stage (Group D) | (Croatia) Nexe Našice | 19-31 | 27-26 | 4th |
| 2016–17 | EHF Cup | Second qualifying round | (Switzerland) Pfadi Winterthur | 28-23 | 20-27 | 48–50 |
| 2017–18 | EHF Cup | Second qualifying round | (Iceland) Valur FC | 27-22 | 28-19 | 55–41 |
| 2017–18 | EHF Cup | Third qualifying round | (Spain) Fraikin BM. Granollers | 25-27 | 21-28 | 46–55 |
| 2018–19 | EHF Cup | Third qualifying round | (Czech Republic) HC Baník Karviná | 32-29 | 34-33 | 66–62 |
| 2018–19 | EHF Cup | Group stage (Group A) | (Germany) Füchse Berlin | 24-29 | 23-36 | 4th |
| 2018–19 | EHF Cup | Group stage (Group A) | (Spain) Naturhouse La Rioja | 35-34 | 24-29 | 4th |
| 2018–19 | EHF Cup | Group stage (Group A) | (France) Saint-Raphaël Var Handball | 27-32 | 23-27 | 4th |
| 2019–20 | EHF Cup | Third qualifying round | (Spain) ABANCA Ademar León | 30-27 | 21-29 | 51–56 |
| 2020–21 | EHF European League | Second qualifying round | (Slovenia) RK Trimo Trebnje | x | 22-23 | 22–23 |
| 2021–22 | EHF European League | First qualifying round | (Sweden) HK Malmö | 27-25 | 20-22 | 47–47 (a) |
| 2022–23 | EHF European League | Group stage (Group C) | (Spain) Fraikin BM Granollers | 25–30 | 30–33 | 6th |
| 2022–23 | EHF European League | Group stage (Group C) | (Croatia) RK Nexe | 28–31 | 23–37 | 6th |
| 2022–23 | EHF European League | Group stage (Group C) | (Denmark) Skjern Håndbold | 28–31 | 26–32 | 6th |
| 2022–23 | EHF European League | Group stage (Group C) | (Portugal) Sporting CP | 25–31 | 32–35 | 6th |
| 2022–23 | EHF European League | Group stage (Group C) | (Austria) Alpla HC Hard | 27–26 | 30–30 | 6th |
| 2025–26 | EHF European Cup | Round 1 | (Turkey) Beykoz Belediyespor | 43–20 | 42–18 | 85–38 |
| 2025–26 | EHF European Cup | Round 2 | (Azerbaijan) Kür HK | 42–19 | 39–20 | 81–39 |
| 2025–26 | EHF European Cup | Round 3 | (Austria) HC Fivers WAT Margareten | 32–29 | 34–31 | 66–60 |
| 2025–26 | EHF European Cup | Last 16 | (Czech Republic) HCB Karviná | 27–28 | 28–30 | 55–58 |
