= Slovenian Handball Supercup =

The Slovenian Handball Supercup is a men’s handball competition in Slovenia, and is played between the champions of the Slovenian League and the winners of the Slovenian Cup.

== Results ==
=== List of matches ===
Year	Location	Winners	Runners-up	Score
2007	Velenje	Celje	Gorenje Velenje	30–23
2008	Koper	Koper	Trimo Trebnje	37–26
2009	Maribor	Gorenje Velenje	Trimo Trebnje	29–25
2010	Maribor	Celje	Maribor Branik	34–28
2011	Trbovlje	Gorenje Velenje	Koper	33–28
2012	Sevnica	Gorenje Velenje	Celje	28–24
2013	Not held			
2014	Portorož	Celje	SVIŠ	31–22
2015	Portorož	Celje	Gorenje Velenje	29–27
2016	Portorož	Celje	Koper 2013	25–24
2017	Slovenj Gradec	Celje	Maribor Branik	32–25
2018	Novo Mesto	Krka	Celje	23–22
2019	Slovenj Gradec	Celje	Gorenje Velenje	25–23
2020	Not held			
2021	Not held			
2022	Gornja Radgona	Gorenje Velenje	Celje	35–33 (pen.)
2023	Ormož	Celje	Jeruzalem Ormož	31–22
2024	Not held			
2025	Črnomelj	Slovan	Krka	36–29
2026	Celje	Trimo Trebnje	Celje	30–30 (4–2 pen.)

=== Titles by club ===
Club	Titles	Years won
Celje	8	2007, 2010, 2014, 2015, 2016, 2017, 2019, 2023
Gorenje Velenje	4	2009, 2011, 2012, 2022
Koper	1	2008
Krka	1	2018
Slovan	1	2025
Trimo Trebnje	1	2026
