= Tabor District =

City district of Maribor, Slovenia

Coordinates: 46°32′49″N 15°38′38″E

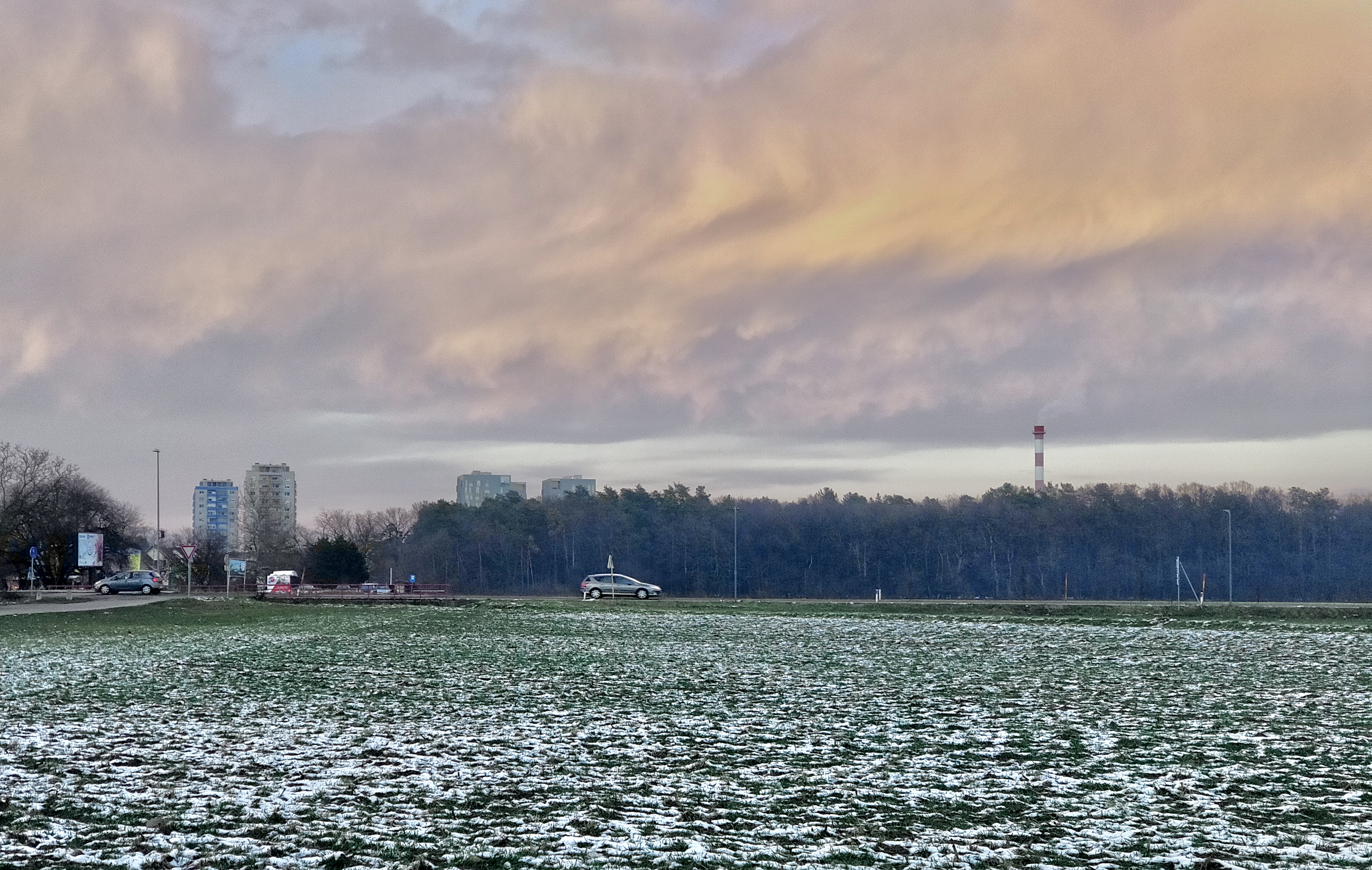
View of the Betnava Woods, Betnava, Maribor

The Tabor District (pronounced [ˈtaːbɔɾ]; Slovene: Mestna četrt Tabor) is a city district of the City Municipality of Maribor in northeastern Slovenia. In 2017, the district had a population of 10,632.

The local football club is called NK Maribor Tabor, which play their home matches at the Tabor Sports Park. Tabor is home of Tabor Hall, the biggest indoor hall in the city, and the Tabor Ice Hall.
