= Luka Žvižej =

Slovenian handball player

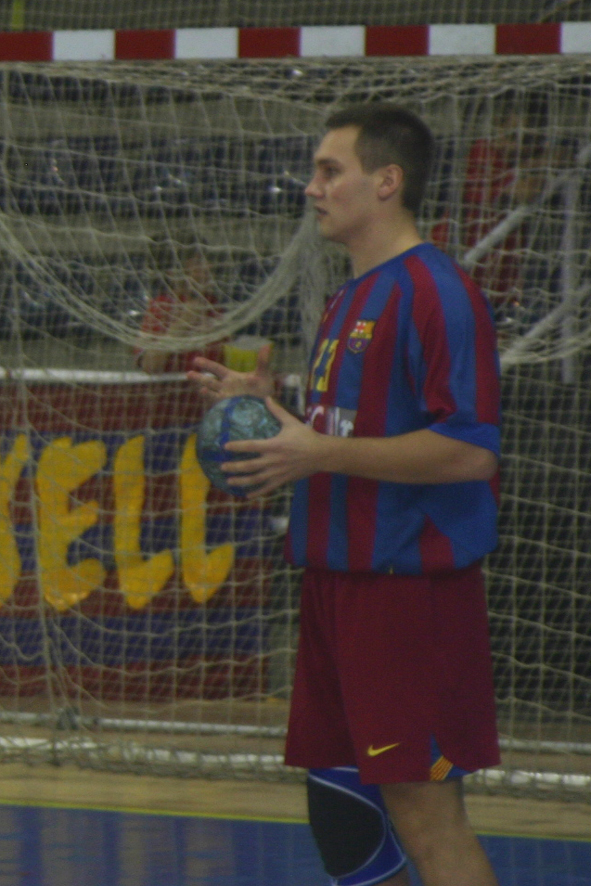
- Žvižej with FC Barcelona Handbol in 2005

Personal information
- Nationality: Slovenian
- Born: 9 December 1980 (age 45) Celje, SFR Yugoslavia
- Height: 1.85 m (6 ft 1 in)

Sport
- Sport: Handball
- Position: Left wing
- Current club: HSG Bärnbach/Köflach (head coach)

Senior clubs
- Years: Team
- 2000–2003: RK Celje
- 2003–2004: Teka Cantabria
- 2004–2006: FC Barcelona Handbol
- 2006–2007: Teka Cantabria
- 2007–2010: SC Pick Szeged
- 2010–2017: RK Celje
- 2017: RK Maribor Branik
- 2017–2019: GWD Minden
National team
Years	Team	Apps	(Gls)
2000–2016	Slovenia	217	(702)

Teams managed
- 2021: RK Celje
- 2021–2023: RK Maribor Branik
- 2022–: Slovenia (assistant)
- 2023–: HSG Bärnbach/Köflach

Luka Žvižej (born 9 December 1980) is a retired Slovenian handball player. He competed at the 2004 Summer Olympics in Athens, where Slovenia placed 11th. Žvižej also represented the national team at the 2012 European Men's Handball Championship, the 2013 World Championship, the 2015 World Championship, and the 2016 European Championship.
