= Borut Mačkovšek =

Slovenian handball player (born 1992)

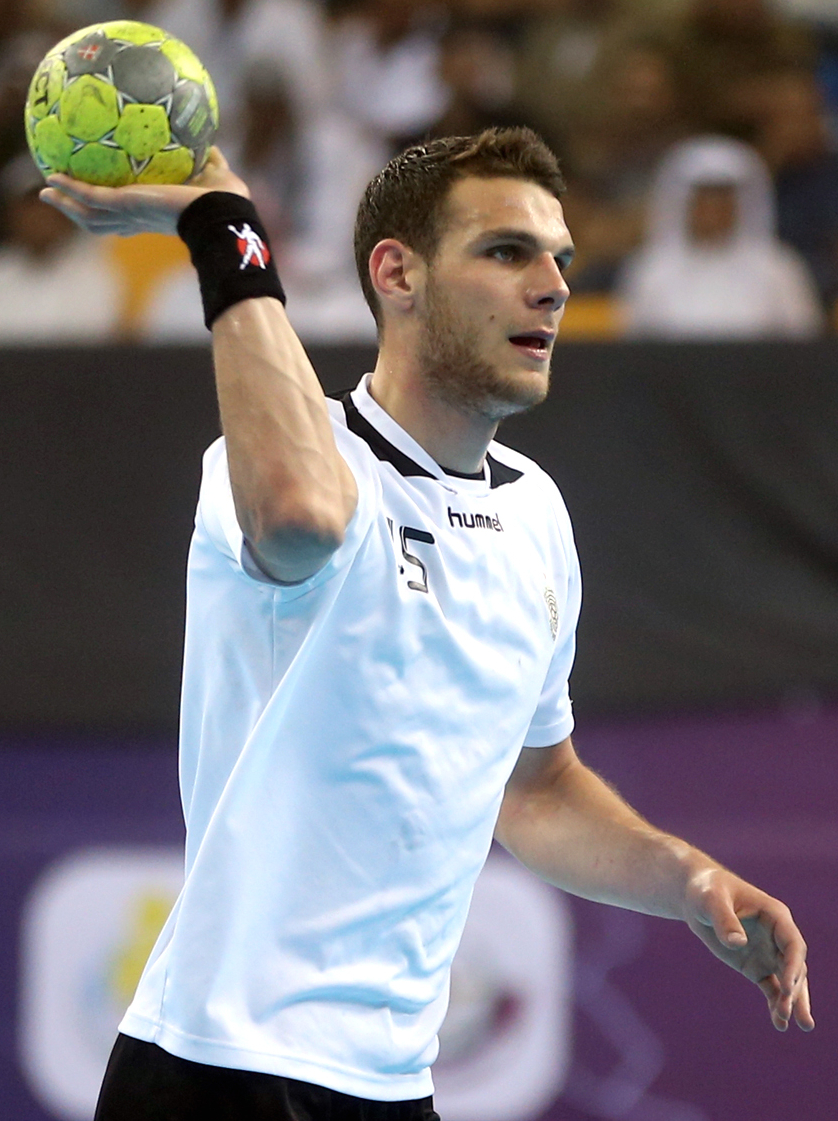

Personal information
- Nationality: Slovenian
- Born: 11 September 1992 (age 34) Koper, Slovenia
- Height: 2.03 m (6 ft 8 in)

Sport
- Sport: Handball
- Position: Left back
- Current club: SC Pick Szeged
- Number: 51

Youth career
- Years: Team
- 2001–2007: RD Izola
- 2007–2009: RK Celje

Senior clubs
- Years: Team
- 2009–2010: RK Celje
- 2010–2011: RK Maribor Branik
- 2011–2013: RK Celje
- 2013: Al Sadd
- 2013–2014: TSV Hannover-Burgdorf
- 2014: HC Dinamo Minsk
- 2014: RK Celje
- 2014–2015: Montpellier Handball
- 2015–2016: ThSV Eisenach
- 2016–2018: RK Celje
- 2018–2020: Telekom Veszprém
- 2020–: SC Pick Szeged
National team
Years	Team	Apps	(Gls)
2011–	Slovenia	162	(419)
Medal record
World Championship
Bronze medal – third place	2017 France
- Updated on 24 January 2026

Borut Mačkovšek (born 11 September 1992) is a Slovenian handball player who plays for SC Pick Szeged and the Slovenia national team.

Since his first appearance at the 2012 European Men's Handball Championship, he has represented Slovenia at several major tournaments, including the 2024 Summer Olympics.
