= 2010–11 EHF Cup Winners' Cup =

Tournament details
- Dates: 20 September 2010 – 20 May 2010
- Teams: 32

Final positions
- Champions: (Germany) VfL Gummersbach (4th title)
- Runners-up: Tremblay-en-France Handball

Tournament statistics
- Top scorer: (Croatia) Vedran Zrnić (60 goals)

The 2010–11 EHF Cup Winners' Cup season, VfL Gummersbach won the Europe's club handball tournament.

== Knockout stage ==
=== Round 3 ===
Team 1	Agg.	Team 2	1st leg	2nd leg
A.S.D. Albatro (Italy)	36–71	(Austria) Moser Medical UHK Krems	16–35	20–36
Frederiksberg IF (Denmark)	60–51	(Estonia) HC Kehra	28–27	32–24
HK Drott HALMSTAD (Sweden)	54–52	(Switzerland) Pfadi Winterthur	28–25	26–27
Dragūnas Klaipėda (Lithuania)	42–53	(Norway) Elverum Håndball	19–26	23–27
KH Besa Famgas (Kosovo)	30–87	(Germany) VfL Gummersbach	15–46	15–41
Xico Andebol (Portugal)	60–57	(Montenegro) RK Lovćen	34–32	26–25
Budyvelnik (Ukraine)	51–39	RK Kaštela Adriachem	33–20	18–19
RK Kolubara (Serbia)	68–65	European University Cyprus	39–33	29–32
Balatonfüredi KSE (Hungary)	55–35	(Romania) Olimpus-85-USEFS	27–16	28–19
RK Maribor Branik (Slovenia)	61–50	(Czech Republic) HCB Karviná	28–22	33–28
RK Vardar PRO (North Macedonia)	71–42	(Luxembourg) HC Berchem	42–23	29–19
A.C. Doukas (Greece)	42–65	(Spain) Amaya Sport San Antonio	22–30	20–35
UCM Sport RESITA (Romania)	57–56	ORLEN Wisła Płock	34–30	23–26
İzmir BSB SK (Turkey)	51–60	(Bosnia and Herzegovina) HRK Izvidac	28–29	23–31
Tremblay-en-France Handball	54–47	(Netherlands) FIQAS Aalsmeer	31–23	23–24
HC Kaustik Volgograd (Russia)	78–58	(Iceland) HK	39–34	39–24

=== Round of 16 ===
Team 1	Agg.	Team 2	1st leg	2nd leg
Xico Andebol (Portugal)	47–78	(Germany) VfL Gummersbach	20–39	27–39
Amaya Sport San Antonio (Spain)	63–57	(Bosnia and Herzegovina) HRK Izvidac	36–29	27–28
Tremblay-en-France Handball	49–47	(Hungary) Balatonfüredi KSE	29–27	20–20
Budyvelnik (Ukraine)	47–60	(Romania) UCM Sport RESITA	16–33	31–27
Elverum Håndball (Norway)	60–58	(Russia) HC Kaustik Volgograd	30–30	30–28
RK Kolubara (Serbia)	53–72	(Slovenia) RK Maribor Branik	26–40	27–32
Moser Medical UHK Krems (Austria)	60–64	(Sweden) HK Drott HALMSTAD	31–29	29–35
RK Vardar PRO (North Macedonia)	60–43	(Denmark) Frederiksberg IF	33–20	27–23

=== Quarterfinals ===
Team 1	Agg.	Team 2	1st leg	2nd leg
RK Maribor Branik (Slovenia)	55–69	(Spain) Amaya Sport San Antonio	28–34	27–35
VfL Gummersbach (Germany)	81–58	(Norway) Elverum Håndball	44–25	37–33
RK Vardar PRO (North Macedonia)	46–45	(Romania) UCM Sport RESITA	28–22	18–23
HK Drott HALMSTAD (Sweden)	51–53	Tremblay-en-France Handball	26–31	25–22

=== Semifinals ===
Team 1	Agg.	Team 2	1st leg	2nd leg
Amaya Sport San Antonio (Spain)	48–48	Tremblay-en-France Handball	27–23	21–25
VfL Gummersbach (Germany)	71–50	(North Macedonia) RK Vardar PRO	33–21	38–29

=== Finals ===
Team 1	Agg.	Team 2	1st leg	2nd leg
Tremblay-en-France Handball	54–56	(Germany) VfL Gummersbach	28–30	26–26

EHF Cup Winners' Cup 2010–11
Winner

VfL Gummersbach
