= Slovenian First League (men's handball) =

Slovenia sports league

- Sport: Handball
- Founded: 1991; 35 years ago
- No. of teams: 12
- Country: Slovenia
- Confederation: EHF
- Most recent champions: Celje (2025–26)
- Most titles: Celje (27 titles)
- Level on pyramid: 1
- Relegation to: 1. B SRL
- International cups: Champions League; EHF Cup
- Website: Official website

The Slovenian First League of Handball (Slovene: 1. slovenska rokometna liga), currently named Liga NLB due to sponsorship reasons, is the top handball league in Slovenia. It is organized by the Handball Federation of Slovenia (Rokometna zveza Slovenije). The league comprises twelve teams.

== Names ==
Since 1991, the league has been named after sponsors on several occasions, giving it the following names:

- 1. SRL (1991–2002)
- Liga Siol (2002–2004)
- Liga Telekom (2004–2006)
- MIK 1. Liga (2006–2010)
- 1. NLB Leasing liga (2011–2016)
- Liga NLB (2017–present)

== Clubs ==
As of the 2026–27 season

- Ajdovščina
- Celje
- Gorenje Velenje
- Jeruzalem Ormož
- Krka
- Ribnica
- Slovan
- Slovenj Gradec
- SVIŠ
- Škofja Loka
- Škofljica
- Trimo Trebnje

== List of seasons ==
Season	Champions	Runners-up	Third place
1991–92	Celje	Slovan	Jadran
1992–93	Celje	Jadran	Prevent
1993–94	Celje	Gorenje Velenje	Jadran
1994–95	Celje	Jadran	Gorenje Velenje
1995–96	Celje	Gorenje Velenje	Dobova
1996–97	Celje	Prevent	Prule 67
1997–98	Celje	Prevent	Trimo Trebnje
1998–99	Celje	Prevent	Trimo Trebnje
1999–2000	Celje	Prule 67	Trimo Trebnje
2000–01	Celje	Prule 67	Prevent
2001–02	Prule 67	Celje	Gorenje Velenje
2002–03	Celje	Prule 67	Gorenje Velenje
2003–04	Celje	Gorenje Velenje	Prevent
2004–05	Celje	Gorenje Velenje	Jeruzalem Ormož
2005–06	Celje	Gold Club	Gorenje Velenje
2006–07	Celje	Gorenje Velenje	Cimos Koper
2007–08	Celje	Cimos Koper	Gorenje Velenje
2008–09	Gorenje Velenje	Cimos Koper	Trimo Trebnje
2009–10	Celje	Gorenje Velenje	Cimos Koper
2010–11	Cimos Koper	Gorenje Velenje	Celje
2011–12	Gorenje Velenje	Celje	Cimos Koper
2012–13	Gorenje Velenje	Celje	Cimos Koper
2013–14	Celje	Gorenje Velenje	Maribor Branik
2014–15	Celje	Gorenje Velenje	Maribor Branik
2015–16	Celje	Gorenje Velenje	Riko Ribnica
2016–17	Celje	Gorenje Velenje	Riko Ribnica
2017–18	Celje	Riko Ribnica	Gorenje Velenje
2018–19	Celje	Gorenje Velenje	Riko Ribnica
2019–20	Celje	Riko Ribnica	Trimo Trebnje
2020–21	Gorenje Velenje	Trimo Trebnje	Celje
2021–22	Celje	Trimo Trebnje	Gorenje Velenje
2022–23	Celje	Gorenje Velenje	Trimo Trebnje
2023–24	Gorenje Velenje	Trimo Trebnje	Celje
2024–25	Slovan	Gorenje Velenje	Trimo Trebnje
2025–26	Celje	Slovan	Trimo Trebnje

Club	Titles	Years won
Celje	27	1992, 1993, 1994, 1995, 1996, 1997, 1998, 1999, 2000, 2001, 2003, 2004, 2005, 2006, 2007, 2008, 2010, 2014, 2015, 2016, 2017, 2018, 2019, 2020, 2022, 2023, 2026
Gorenje Velenje	5	2009, 2012, 2013, 2021, 2024
Koper	1	2011
Prule 67	1	2002
Slovan	1	2025
