= GEN Energija =

State-owned power company in Slovenia

GEN energija, d.o.o.
- Company type: Limited liability company (d.o.o.)
- Industry: Electricity
- Founded: 2001
- Founder: Government of Slovenia
- Headquarters: Ljubljana, Slovenia
- Products: Electric power
- Owner: Government of Slovenia
- Website: www.gen-energija.si

GEN energija, d.o.o. is a state-owned power company in Slovenia. It is the parent company in the GEN Group. GEN energija was established 2001 as Eles Gen, a subsidiary of Elektro-Slovenija, for holding Slovenian shares in the Krško Nuclear Power Plant. In February 2006 the company was separated from Elektro-Slovenija and it became directly owned by the state.

In addition to the parent company the GEN Group also comprises electric power companies Krško Nuclear Power Plant, Savske elektrarne Ljubljana (SEL), Hidroelektrarne na Spodnji Savi (HESS), Termoelektrarna Brestanica (TEB) and energy trading company GEN-I.

== Projects ==
The key strategic project of GEN energija is the construction of a second nuclear power plant unit in Krško (JEK2). The planned site of the JEK2 is in the direct vicinity of the Krško Nuclear Power Plant. The proposal places it to the west of the existing plant. The technology to be used in the construction of JEK2 is a third-generation pressurised water reactor with an installed capacity of close to 1,100 MW. According to plans the construction of the JEK2 should begin in 2027 and it should start operation in 2033.
