= Zoran Jovičić (handballer) =

Slovenian handball player

Zoran Jovičić (born 4 November 1975 in Tuzla) is a Slovenian former handball player who competed in the 2000 Summer Olympics and in the 2004 Summer Olympics.
