= RD Slovan =

Slovenian handball club

- Full name: Rokometno društvo Slovan
- Founded: 1949; 77 years ago
- Arena: Kodeljevo Hall
- Capacity: 1,540
- President: Krištof Mlakar
- Head coach: Uroš Zorman
- League: Slovenian First League
- 2025–26: Regular season: 1st of 12; Playoffs: Runners-up
- Club colours
Home	Away

Rokometno društvo Slovan, commonly referred to as RD Slovan or simply Slovan, is a handball club based in Ljubljana, Slovenia that competes in the Slovenian First League, the top tier of Slovenian handball. They play their home matches at Kodeljevo Sports Park, a 1,540 all-seated hall in Ljubljana.

== Team ==
=== Current squad ===
Squad for the 2026–27 season.

Goalkeepers

- 1 (Bosnia and Herzegovina) Nebojša Bojić
- 16 (Slovenia) Aljaž Panjtar
- 22 (Slovenia) Klemen Ferlin

Left wingers

- 3 (Slovenia) Staš Slatinek Jovičić
- 41 (Slovenia) Uroš Knavs

Right wingers

- 10 (Slovenia) Tim Cokan
- 11 (Slovenia) Urban Pipp

Line players

- 7 (Croatia) Roko Trivković
- 44 (Croatia) Ilija Brozović (c)
- 93 (Slovenia) Stefan Žabić

Left backs

- 20 (Slovenia) Tarik Mlivić
- 21 (Belarus) Kiryl Samoila
- 24 (Slovenia) Vid Miklavec

Central backs

- 14 (Slovenia) Domen Tajnik
- 34 (Slovenia) Ahmed Begić
- 61 (Slovenia) Staš Skube

Right backs

- 5 (Slovenia) Mirko Latković
- 33 (Slovenia) Tadej Kljun
- 77 (Montenegro) Stefan Čavor

== Honours ==
=== Domestic ===
- Yugoslav Championship

Winners (1): 1979–80

- Slovenian First League

Winners (1): 2024–25
Runners-up (2): 1991–92, 2025–26

- Slovenian Second League

Winners (2): 2012–13, 2019–20
Runners-up (2): 2004–05, 2016–17

- Yugoslav Handball Cup

Runners-up (4): 1972–73, 1974–75, 1981–82, 1985–86

- Slovenian Handball Cup

Winners (1): 2024–25
Runners-up (2): 1992–93, 1995–96

- Slovenian Supercup

Winners: 2025

=== European ===
- European Cup

Runners-up (1): 1980–81

== Season-by-season records ==
Season	Division	League	Pos.	Cup	European competition
1991–92	1	First League	2	Quarterfinals	—
1992–93	1	First League	4	Runners-up	IHF Cup Round of 16
1993–94	1	First League	2/QF	Semifinals	EHF Cup Winners' Cup Round of 32
1994–95	1	First League	5	Round of 16	—
1995–96	1	First League	7	Runners-up	—
1996–97	1	First League	10	Quarterfinals	EHF Cup Winners' Cup Round of 32
1997–98	1	First League	10	Quarterfinals	—
1998–99	1	First League	9	Round of 16	—
1999–00	1	First League	7	Quarterfinals	—
2000–01	1	First League	10	Quarterfinals	—
2001–02	1	First League	8	Round of 32	—
2002–03	1	First League	9	Quarterfinals	—
2003–04	2	Second League	3	Round of 32	—
2004–05	2	Second League	2	Round of 16	—
2005–06	1	First League	10	Round of 16	—
2006–07	1	First League	9	Round of 32	—
2007–08	1	First League	9	Round of 16	—
2008–09	1	First League	5	Quarterfinals	—
2009–10	1	First League	4	Round of 16	EHF Challenge Cup Semifinals
2010–11	1	First League	12	Quarterfinals	EHF Challenge Cup Round of 16
2011–12	2	Second League	5	Round of 16	—
2012–13	2	Second League	1	Round of 32	—
2013–14	1	First League	10	Quarterfinals	—
2014–15	1	First League	10	Round of 16	—
2015–16	1	First League	13	Round of 64	—
2016–17	2	Second League	2	Round of 16	—
2017–18	1	First League	11	Round of 16	—
2018–19	2	Second League	3	Round of 16	—
2019–20	2	Second League	1 (Note: The league season was finished early due to the COVID-19 pandemic. The cup competition was cancelled before the quarterfinals.)	Quarterfinals	—
2020–21	1	First League	10	Not held	—
2021–22	1	First League	9	Round of 32	—
2022–23	1	First League	9	Round of 16	—
2023–24	1	First League	9	Round of 16	—
2024–25	1	First League	1	Winners	—
2025–26	1	First League	2	Third place	EHF European League Group stage

Colour key

Promoted	Relegated
