= Slovenian Handball Cup =

The Slovenian Handball Cup is the top knockout tournament of Slovenian handball. The most successful clubs are Celje (men's) and Krim (women's) with 23 and 30 titles, respectively. The inaugural edition was held in the 1991–92 season.

== Men's ==
Season	Winners	Runners-up	Score
1991–92	Celje	Bakovci	32–19
1992–93	Celje	Slovan	15–10
1993–94	Celje	Prevent	25–21
1994–95	Celje	Gorenje	31–20
1995–96	Celje	Slovan	27–22
1996–97	Celje	Gorenje	29–19
1997–98	Celje	Gorenje	25–21
1998–99	Celje	Prule 67	29–24
1999–2000	Celje	Prule 67	29–25
2000–01	Celje	Gorenje	29–23
2001–02	Prule 67	Celje	27–26
2002–03	Gorenje	Prule 67	29–25
2003–04	Celje	Prevent	40–25
2004–05	Gold Club	Celje	40–37
2005–06	Celje	Gold Club	27–24
2006–07	Celje	Gorenje	28–26
2007–08	Koper	Gold Club	30–25
2008–09	Koper	Celje	24–19
2009–10	Celje	Maribor Branik	35–33
2010–11	Koper	Gorenje	22–20
2011–12	Celje	Koper	26–21
2012–13	Celje	Gorenje	28–24
2013–14	Celje	SVIŠ	31–16
2014–15	Celje	Gorenje	34–29
2015–16	Celje	Koper	38–25
2016–17	Celje	Maribor Branik	36–28
2017–18	Celje	Krka	40–33
2018–19	Gorenje	Krka	24–20
2019–20	Cancelled (COVID-19 pandemic)		
2020–21	Not played		
2021–22	Gorenje	Loka	34–31
2022–23	Celje	Jeruzalem Ormož	35–24
2023–24	Trimo Trebnje	Slovenj Gradec	35–28
2024–25	Slovan	Krka	33–27
2025–26	Celje	Trimo Trebnje	36–31

Club	Titles	Years won
Celje	23	1992, 1993, 1994, 1995, 1996, 1997, 1998, 1999, 2000, 2001, 2004, 2006, 2007, 2010, 2012, 2013, 2014, 2015, 2016, 2017, 2018, 2023, 2026
Gorenje	3	2003, 2019, 2022
Koper	3	2008, 2009, 2011
Prule 67	1	2002
Gold Club	1	2005
Trimo Trebnje	1	2024
Slovan	1	2025

== Women's ==
- 1991–92: Olimpija
- 1992–93: Krim
- 1993–94: Krim
- 1994–95: Krim
- 1995–96: Krim
- 1996–97: Krim
- 1997–98: Olimpija
- 1998–99: Krim
- 1999–2000: Krim
- 2000–01: Krim
- 2001–02: Krim
- 2002–03: Krim
- 2003–04: Krim
- 2004–05: Krim
- 2005–06: Krim
- 2006–07: Krim
- 2007–08: Krim
- 2008–09: Krim
- 2009–10: Krim
- 2010–11: Krim
- 2011–12: Krim
- 2012–13: Krim
- 2013–14: Krim
- 2014–15: Krim
- 2015–16: Krim
- 2016–17: Krim
- 2017–18: Krim
- 2018–19: Krim
- 2019–20: No winners (COVID-19 pandemic)
- 2020–21: Not played
- 2021–22: Krim
- 2022–23: Krim
- 2023–24: Ajdovščina
- 2024–25: Krim
- 2025–26: Krim

Club	Titles	Years won
Krim	30	1993, 1994, 1995, 1996, 1997, 1999, 2000, 2001, 2002, 2003, 2004, 2005, 2006, 2007, 2008, 2009, 2010, 2011, 2012, 2013, 2014, 2015, 2016, 2017, 2018, 2019, 2022, 2023, 2025, 2026
Olimpija	2	1992, 1998
Ajdovščina	1	2024
