= RD Rudar Trbovlje =

RD Rudar
- Full name: Rokometno društvo Rudar Trbovlje
- Nickname(s): Zeleno-črni (The Green-Blacks); Knapi (The Miners)
- Founded: 1952; 74 years ago 2009; 17 years ago (refounded)
- Arena: Polaj Sports Hall
- Head coach: Žiga Radulovič
- League: Slovenian Second League
- 2025–26: 2. SRL, 7th of 12
- Club colours
Home	Away

Rokometno društvo Rudar Trbovlje or simply RD Rudar is a handball club from Trbovlje, Slovenia. As of the 2026–27 season, the club competes in the Slovenian Second Handball League (2. SRL), the third tier of Slovenian handball.
