= Boris Denič =

Slovenian handball coach

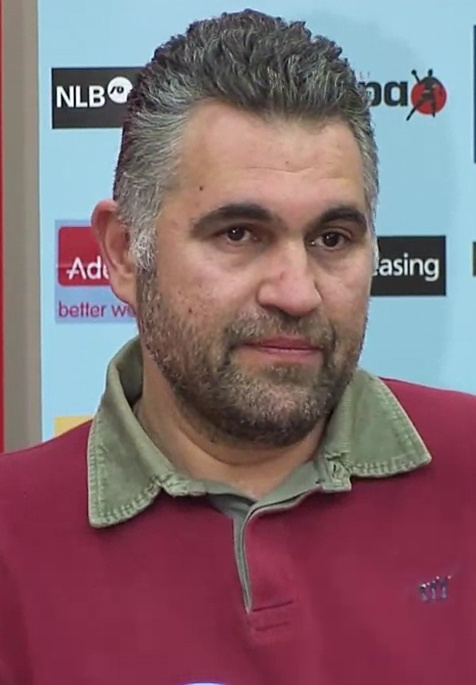
Boris Denič in 2015

Boris Denič (born 12 September 1967) is a Slovenian handball coach and former player. He coached the Slovenia men's national handball team between 2010 and 2015.

== Career ==
Denič played as a goalkeeper. He earned 52 appearances for the Slovenia national team.
