= RK Koper =

Slovenian handball club

- Full name: Rokometni klub Koper
- Founded: 1950; 76 years ago
- Dissolved: 2013; 13 years ago
- Arena: Bonifika Hall
- Capacity: 3,000
- Club colours
Home	Away

Rokometni klub Koper (English: Koper Handball Club), commonly referred to as RK Koper or simply Koper, was a handball club from Koper, Slovenia. Koper played their home matches at Bonifika Hall. The team was dissolved in 2013 due to high financial debt. The team was also known as Cimos Koper due to sponsorship reasons. In 2013, a new club, named RD Koper 2013, was established.

== History ==
Handball was played in Koper since the 1950s. Initially under TVD Partizan and later as RK Koper, for a while there were even two handball clubs in the town. Over the years, the club ceased operations many times and was brought back to life again.

In the 1994–95 season, the club organised its structure of sections and in the 1999–2000 season, the club qualified for the Slovenian second division. As a consequence, the club received a support from the local company Cimos. In the 2001–02 season, RK Cimos Koper qualified to the Slovenian First League of Handball.

In the 2004–05 season, Koper qualified for the EHF Cup. In the Slovenian league, they finished third in the 2006–07 season. In the next season, they finished as runners-up and qualified for the EHF Champions League. Following the 2012–13 season, the club was disbanded due to high financial debt.

== Honours ==
League

- Slovenian Championship

Winners: 2010–11
Runners-up: 2007–08, 2008–09

Cup

- Slovenian Cup

Winners: 2007–08, 2008–09, 2010–11
Runners-up: 2011–12

- Slovenian Supercup

Winners: 2008

International

- EHF Challenge Cup

Winners: 2010–11

- EHF Cup:

Semi-final: 2007–08
