= RD Koper =

Slovenian handball club

- Full name: Rokometno društvo Koper 2013
- Short name: RD Koper
- Founded: 2013; 13 years ago
- Arena: Arena Bonifika
- Capacity: 3,000
- President: Nejc Poklar
- Head coach: Uroš Rapotec
- League: 1. B SRL
- 2025–26: Regular season: 2nd of 12; Playoffs: Third place
- Club colours
Home	Away

Rokometno društvo Koper 2013 or simply RD Koper is a handball club from Koper, Slovenia. The club was founded in 2013 and play their home games at Arena Bonifika.

== History ==
RD Koper 2013 was founded in 2013 when the old club, RK Koper, was dissolved due to bankruptcy.

== Honours ==
League

- Slovenian Second Division

Winners: 2014–15

- Slovenian Third Division

Winners: 2013–14

Cup

- Slovenian Cup

Runners-up: 2015–16

- Slovenian Supercup

Runners-up: 2016
