= RD Loka =

Handball club from Škofja Loka, Slovenia

Loka
- Full name: Rokometno društvo Škofja Loka
- Founded: 1958; 68 years ago
- Dissolved: 2011; 15 years ago
- Arena: Poden Sports Hall
- Club colours
Home	Away

Rokometno društvo Škofja Loka or simply RD Loka, also known as RD Merkur due to sponsorship reasons, was a handball club from Škofja Loka, Slovenia. The club was dissolved in late 2011 due to bankruptcy. In January 2012, a new club named RD Loka 2012 was founded.
