= RK Jadran Hrpelje-Kozina =

Slovenian handball club from Hrpelje

Jadran Hrpelje-Kozina
- Full name: Rokometni klub Jadran Hrpelje-Kozina
- Founded: 28 August 1965; 60 years ago 2009 (refounded)
- Arena: Hrpelje Blue Hall
- Club colours
Home	Away

Rokometni klub Jadran Hrpelje-Kozina (English: Jadran Hrpelje-Kozina Handball Club) or simply RK Jadran is a Slovenian handball club based in Hrpelje. The club withdrew from the Slovenian First League in 2009 due to financial difficulties, and was reestablished later that same year.

== History ==
=== Name changes ===
Club names through history:

- RK Hrpelje (1965–1966)
- RK Jadran (1966–1982)
- RK Astra Jadran (1982–1992)
- RK Andor Jadran (1992–1994)
- Primorske novice Jadran (1994–1996)
- RK Jadran (1996–2000)
- RK Pivka Perutninarstvo (2000–2003)
- RK Gold Club (2003–2009)
- RD Jadran Hrpelje-Kozina (2009–present)

== Honours ==
=== Domestic ===
- Slovenian Cup: 2004–05

=== European record ===
- 1995–96 EHF Cup – Round of 32
- 2006–07 EHF Champions League – Round of 16
- 2007–08 EHF Cup – Third round
