= Kodeljevo Hall =

Indoor arena in Ljubljana, Slovenia

- Interactive map of Kodeljevo Hall
- Location: Ljubljana, Slovenia
- Coordinates: 46°3′1.42″N 14°31′59″E
- Owner: City Municipality of Ljubljana
- Operator: Javni zavod Šport Ljubljana
- Capacity: 1,540
- Surface: parquet

Construction
- Built: 1970

Tenants
- KD Slovan; RD Slovan; RK Krim

Kodeljevo Hall is a multi-purpose indoor arena located in Ljubljana, Slovenia with a seating capacity of 1,540. It is mostly used for basketball and handball matches as the home ground of KD Slovan and RD Slovan, respectively.
