= Slovenia men's national handball team =

Slovenia

Information
- Association: Handball Federation of Slovenia
- Coach: Uroš Zorman
- Assistant coach: Mirko Skoko
- Most caps: Uroš Zorman (225)
- Most goals: Jure Dolenec (714)

Colours
1st	2nd

Results

Summer Olympics
- Appearances: 4 (First in 2000)
- Best result: 4th (2024)

World Championship
- Appearances: 11 (First in 1995)
- Best result: (bronze) 3rd (2017)

European Championship
- Appearances: 15 (First in 1994)
- Best result: (silver) 2nd (2004)
- Last updated on 28 January 2026.

Slovenia men's national handball team
Medal record

European Championship
Silver medal – second place	2004 Slovenia	

World Championship
Bronze medal – third place	2017 France	

The Slovenia national handball team represents Slovenia in international handball matches. Their biggest success is the silver medal at the 2004 European Men's Handball Championship and third place at the 2017 World Men's Handball Championship.

== Competitive record ==
Key

Runners-up Third place As host

=== Olympic Games ===
Year	Round	Position	GP	W	D	L
(United States) 1996	Did not qualify					
(Australia) 2000	7th/8th place	8th	8	2	1	5
(Greece) 2004	11th/12th place	11th	6	2	0	4
(China) 2008	Did not qualify					
(United Kingdom) 2012	Did not qualify					
(Brazil) 2016	Quarter-finals	6th	6	4	0	2
(Japan) 2020	Did not qualify					
(France) 2024	Semi-finals	4th	8	4	0	4
(United States) 2028	To be determined					
Total	Semi-finals	4th place	28	12	1	15

=== World Championship ===
Year	Round	Position	GP	W	D	L
(Sweden) 1993	Did not participate					
(Iceland) 1995	Preliminary round	18th	5	1	0	4
(Japan) 1997	Did not qualify					
(Egypt) 1999	Did not qualify					
(France) 2001	Preliminary round	17th	5	2	0	3
(Portugal) 2003	Second round	11th	7	3	0	4
(Tunisia) 2005	11th/12th place	12th	9	4	2	3
(Germany) 2007	9th/10th place	10th	8	3	0	5
(Croatia) 2009	Did not qualify					
(Sweden) 2011	Did not qualify					
(Spain) 2013	Semi-finals	4th	9	7	0	2
(Qatar) 2015	7th/8th place	8th	9	4	0	5
(France) 2017	Semi-finals	3rd place, bronze medalist(s)	9	6	1	2
(Denmark) (Germany) 2019	Did not qualify					
(Egypt) 2021	Main round	9th	6	3	2	1
(Poland) (Sweden) 2023	Main round	10th	6	4	0	2
(Croatia) (Denmark) (Norway) 2025	Main round	13th	6	3	0	3
(Germany) 2027	Qualified					
Total	Semi-finals	3rd place	79	40	5	34

=== European Championship ===
Year	Round	Position	GP	W	D	L
(Portugal) 1994	9th/10th place	10th	6	1	1	4
(Spain) 1996	11th/12th place	11th	6	1	0	5
(Italy) 1998	Did not qualify					
(Croatia) 2000	5th/6th place	5th	6	3	0	3
(Sweden) 2002	11th/12th place	12th	7	0	2	5
(Slovenia) 2004	Final	2nd place, silver medalist(s)	8	5	1	2
(Switzerland) 2006	Main round	8th	6	3	0	3
(Norway) 2008	Main round	10th	6	3	0	3
(Austria) 2010	Main round	11th	6	1	2	3
(Serbia) 2012	5th/6th place	6th	7	2	0	5
(Denmark) 2014	Did not qualify					
(Poland) 2016	Preliminary round	14th	3	0	1	2
(Croatia) 2018	Main round	8th	6	2	2	2
(Austria) (Norway) (Sweden) 2020	Semi-finals	4th	9	5	0	4
(Hungary) (Slovakia) 2022	Preliminary round	16th	3	1	0	2
(Germany) 2024	5th/6th place	6th	8	5	0	3
(Denmark) (Norway) (Sweden) 2026	Main round	8th	7	4	0	3
Total	Final	2nd place	94	36	9	49

== Team ==
=== Current squad ===
The squad for the 2026 European Men's Handball Championship.

Head coach: Uroš Zorman

Caps and goals are correct as of 24 January 2026.

No.	Pos.	Name	Date of birth (age)	Height	App.	Goals	Club
1	GK	Jože Baznik	24 May 1993 (age 33)	1.87 m	37	2	(France) Pays d'Aix Université Club
5	LB	Nik Henigman	4 December 1995 (age 30)	2.01 m	95	125	(North Macedonia) RK Eurofarm Pelister
8	RW	Blaž Janc	20 November 1996 (age 29)	1.86 m	130	492	(Spain) FC Barcelona
14	CB	Domen Tajnik	31 October 2000 (age 25)	1.83 m	16	26	(North Macedonia) RK Eurofarm Pelister
16	GK	Miljan Vujović	27 August 2000 (age 26)	1.98 m	20	0	(Germany) TVB Stuttgart
19	LW	Staš Jovičić Slatinek	6 December 2000 (age 25)	1.89 m	53	113	(Slovenia) RD Slovan
20	LW	Tilen Kodrin	14 May 1994 (age 32)	1.92 m	113	200	(Germany) VfL Gummersbach
24	LW	Andraž Makuc	24 July 2002 (age 24)	1.86 m	8	28	(Slovenia) RK Celje
27	P	Kristjan Horžen	8 December 1999 (age 26)	1.92 m	72	115	(Germany) VfL Gummersbach
28	RB	Timotej Grmšek	19 May 2000 (age 26)	1.94 m	11	10	(Slovenia) RK Trimo Trebnje
30	RW	Tim Cokan	7 June 2001 (age 25)	1.91 m	19	37	(Slovenia) RD Slovan
32	LB	Tarik Mlivić	21 April 2003 (age 23)	1.95 m	8	27	(Slovenia) RD Slovan
33	P	Stefan Žabić	17 February 1999 (age 27)	2.03 m	20	12	(Slovenia) RD Slovan
35	CB	Domen Makuc	1 July 2000 (age 26)	1.88 m	42	143	(Spain) FC Barcelona
36	P	Lan Grbić	26 May 2000 (age 26)	1.94 m	6	3	(Slovenia) RK Trimo Trebnje
51	LB	Borut Mačkovšek	11 September 1992 (age 34)	2.03 m	162	419	(Hungary) SC Pick Szeged
77	RW	Domen Novak	26 April 1998 (age 28)	1.81 m	63	133	(Germany) SG Flensburg-Handewitt
95	P	Matic Suholežnik	2 May 1995 (age 31)	2.02 m	74	52	(Slovenia) RD Slovan

=== Statistics ===
==== Most matches played ====
Rank	Player	Matches
1	Uroš Zorman	225
2	Luka Žvižej	217
3	Beno Lapajne	212
4	Jure Dolenec	207
5	Tomaž Tomšič	200
6	Vid Kavtičnik	197
7	Gorazd Škof	188
8	Renato Vugrinec	187
9	Aleš Pajovič	181
10	Roman Pungartnik	171

Last updated: 24 January 2026

==== Most goals scored ====
Rank	Player	Goals	Matches	Average
1	Jure Dolenec	714	207	3.45
2	Luka Žvižej	702	217	3.24
3	Aleš Pajovič	697	181	3.85
4	Dragan Gajić	692	161	4.3
5	Roman Pungartnik	679	171	3.97
6	Renato Vugrinec	616	187	3.29
7	Vid Kavtičnik	543	197	2.76
8	Uroš Zorman	523	225	2.32
9	Blaž Janc	492	130	3.78
10	Uroš Šerbec	467	120	3.89

Last updated: 24 January 2026

== Head coaches ==
Since 1992, the Slovenian national team has been managed by a total of twelve head coaches. Tone Tiselj, Miro Požun and Slavko Ivezič are the only coaches with more than one spell.

1990s and 2000s

Years	Name	Competition
1992–1994	Tone Tiselj	1994 European Championship (10th place)
1994–1996	Miro Požun	1995 World Championship (18th place)
1996–1997	Slavko Ivezič	1996 European Championship (11th place)
1998–2000	Leopold Jeras	2000 European Championship (5th place); 2000 Summer Olympics (8th place)
2000–2002	Matjaž Tominec	2001 World Championship (17th place); 2002 European Championship (12th place)
2002–2003	Niko Markovič	2003 World Championship (11th place)
2003–2004	Tone Tiselj	2004 European Championship (2nd place); 2004 Summer Olympics (11th place)
2004–2006	Slavko Ivezič	2005 World Championship (12th place); 2006 European Championship (8th place)
2006–2007	Kasim Kamenica	2007 World Championship (10th place)
2007–2009	Miro Požun	2008 European Championship (10th place)

2010s and 2020s

Years	Name	Competition
2009–2010	Zvonimir Serdarušić	2010 European Championship (11th place)
2010–2015	Boris Denič	2012 European Championship (6th place); 2013 World Championship (4th place); 2015 World Championship (8th place)
2015–2019	Veselin Vujović	2016 European Championship (14th place); 2016 Summer Olympics (6th place); 2017 World Championship (3rd place); 2018 European Championship (8th place)
2019–2022	Ljubomir Vranjes	2020 European Championship (4th place); 2021 World Championship (9th place); 2022 European Championship (16th place)
2022–present	Uroš Zorman	2023 World Championship (10th place); 2024 European Championship (6th place); 2024 Summer Olympics (4th place); 2025 World Championship (13th place); 2026 European Championship (8th place)
