= Red Hall (Slovenia) =

Sports facility arena in Velenje, Slovenia

Coordinates: 46.356969°N 15.115085°E

- Red Hall in 2013
- Interactive map of Red Hall
- Location: Velenje, Slovenia
- Owner: City Municipality of Velenje
- Operator: Športno rekreacijski zavod Rdeča dvorana
- Capacity: 2,500

Construction
- Groundbreaking: 24 August 1974
- Opened: 1975
- Renovated: 1989, 1994, 1998, 2004

Tenants
- RK Gorenje Velenje; ŽRK Velenje

Red Hall (Slovene: Rdeča dvorana) is a sports facility arena in Velenje, Slovenia. It is the home arena of handball club Gorenje Velenje. The venue can accommodate 2,500 spectators.

== History ==
The construction of the venue began on 24 August 1974 and was finished in 1975. The Red Hall had its unofficial opening on 11 October 1975. At first, it was built to host different kinds of fairs, and not sports events.

After some modifications to the object, the government of Slovenia established the public company Sports and Recreation Center Red Hall (Športno rekreacijski zavod Rdeča dvorana) on 25 May 1992. The venue was renovated a few times in its history, most recently in 2004.

== Usage ==
Red Hall is a home arena of Gorenje Velenje (men's handball club) and ŽRK Velenje (women's handball club). It was also one of the four venues used for the 2004 European Men's Handball Championship.
