= MRK Krka =

- Full name: Moški rokometni klub Krka
- Nickname: Farmacevti (The Pharmacists)
- Founded: 2000; 26 years ago
- Arena: Marof Hall
- Capacity: 1,200
- President: Vili Nosan
- Head coach: Mirko Skoko
- League: Slovenian First League
- 2025–26: Regular season: 6th of 12; Playoffs: Sixth place
- Club colours
Home	Away

Moški rokometni klub Krka (English: Men's Handball Club Krka) or simply MRK Krka is a Slovenian handball club from Novo Mesto that competes in the Slovenian First League, the top tier of Slovenian handball.

== Honours ==
- 1. B Slovenian League (second tier)

Runners-up: 2002–03

- Slovenian Second National League (third tier)

Winners: 2000–01

- Slovenian Handball Cup

Runners-up: 2017–18, 2018–19, 2024–25

- Slovenian Supercup

Winners: 2018
Runners-up: 2025
