= RK Slovenj Gradec =

- Full name: Rokometni klub Slovenj Gradec
- Founded: 1954; 72 years ago 2011; 15 years ago (refounded)
- Arena: Slovenj Gradec Sports Hall
- Capacity: 1,200
- President: Damir Budimir
- Head coach: Zoran Jovičić
- League: Slovenian First League
- 2025–26: Regular season: 5th of 12; Playoffs: Fourth place
- Club colours
Home	Away

Rokometni klub Slovenj Gradec (English: Slovenj Gradec Handball Club) or simply RK Slovenj Gradec is a handball club from Slovenj Gradec, Slovenia that competes in the Slovenian First League, the top tier of Slovenian handball. Initially founded in 1954, the club was refounded in 2011 as RK Slovenj Gradec 2011 after the previous club folded due to financial difficulties. It was also known as RK Prevent in the past due to sponsorship reasons.

== Honours ==
- Slovenian Championship:

Runners-up (3): 1996–97, 1997–98, 1998–99

- Slovenian Cup:

Runners-up (3): 1993–94, 2003–04, 2023–24
