= RK Gorenje Velenje =

Handball club in Velenje, Slovenia

- Full name: Rokometni klub Gorenje Velenje
- Nickname: Ose (The Wasps)
- Founded: 1958; 68 years ago
- Arena: Red Hall
- Capacity: 2,500
- President: Peter Šilc
- League: Slovenian First League
- 2025–26: Regular season: 4th of 12; Playoffs: Fifth place
- Club colours
Home	Away

Rokometni klub Gorenje Velenje (English: Gorenje Velenje Handball Club), commonly referred to as RK Gorenje Velenje, is a handball club from Velenje, Slovenia that competes in the Slovenian First League, the top tier of Slovenian handball. They play their games at the Red Hall (Slovene: Rdeča dvorana). The club has won five Slovenian Championships and three Slovenian cup titles. Gorenje has also participated in continental competitions for many seasons, including the EHF Cup, the EHF Cup Winners' Cup, and the EHF Champions League. Along with Celje, Gorenje is one of only two clubs that have featured in every season of the Slovenian First League since the competition's inception in 1991.

The club was previously known as RK Šoštanj and ŠRK Velenje.

== History ==
=== 1958–1972: Foundation and early years in Šoštanj ===
Organized handball began to develop in the town of Šoštanj in 1958, following the establishment of the handball section of TVD Partizan.

Handball was introduced to the area by local school students with the assistance of several basketball players. The first pioneers were Miligoj Jarnovič, Pavle Bukovac, and Jože Pukmajster. Initially, the club competed in the Celje Regional League. In the 1964–65 season, they qualified for the Styrian Regional League. A year later, Šoštanj achieved a major milestone by earning promotion to the Yugoslav Republic League. During the 1970s, handball grew rapidly and became a major event in the region, with matches drawing an average of 1,000 spectators.

=== 1973–1982 ===
Fifteen years after the club was established, they became republic champions by finishing first in the Slovenian Republic League during the 1972–73 season. Consequently, they qualified for the Second Yugoslav League. However, due to a lack of experience and resources, the team was relegated back to the republic level after just one season.

=== 1983–1991 ===
After playing in the inter-republic league from 1981 to 1984, the handball team from Šoštanj qualified for the Second Yugoslav League for the first time since the 1973–74 season. Despite facing financial and managerial difficulties—which included replacing three coaches—the team managed to finish fifth in 1990.

Although the name RK Šoštanj was known across Slovenia and former Yugoslavia, the club decided to change their name to ŠRK Velenje (Šaleški rokometni klub Velenje). This was because all games in previous years were played in Velenje at the Red Hall and because most of the players were locals from Velenje. In that season, ŠRK Velenje finished third. While a top-two finish would have earned them promotion for the First Yugoslav League, a defeat in their final match caused them to miss out on the qualifying spot.

=== 1992–2002 ===
Following their most successful season, during which the club was near the top of the Second Yugoslav League, Slovenia declared its independence. Consequently, for the 1991–92 season, the handball clubs of the newly established country organized their own national championship. As a result, competing in the European Handball Federation (EHF) competitions became possible. In their first season, Gorenje performed below expectations and finished fifth.

After the main part of the competition in the 1993–94 season, Gorenje finished in third place. In the play-offs, they defeated RK Prevent and went on to beat RK Drava Ptuj. Although RK Celje bested them in the finals to take the championship title, Gorenje's position as league runners-up qualified them for EHF competitions, where they reached the semi-finals of the EHF Cup.

=== 2002–2003 ===
The 2002–03 season was historic in many ways for Gorenje. The club was at the top of the Slovenian handball competitions all these years and had some respectable achievements in Europe, but the team from Velenje never made it quite to the top in either competition. However, in the Slovenian Handball Cup finals, Gorenje Velenje defeated RD Prule 67 to claim their first major trophy since Slovenian independence in 1991. This success marked a turning point for the club, solidifying its status both domestically and in Europe. Following this achievement, the president of RK Gorenje, Franc Plaskan, retired and was succeeded by Janez Živko.

=== 2003–2004 ===
The 2003–04 season was another highly successful campaign for Gorenje. Despite experiencing setbacks in the domestic league, the team delivered strong performances in the EHF Cup Winners' Cup, progressing all the way to the semi-finals, where their run finally ended with a defeat on aggregate to Valladolid. However, they bounced back in the domestic play-offs to reach the finals, where they were ultimately defeated by Celje.

=== 2004–2005 ===
Gorenje paid the price for injuries, a side effect of their debut season in the EHF Champions League. Following a string of defeats, they entered the playoffs in third position. However, they advanced directly to the finals without playing a preliminary play-off match. This set up another historic final; the match against Celje ended only after four periods of extra time and a 7-meter penalty shoot-out, with Celje ultimately winning 51–48.

In the Champions League, Gorenje tested themselves at a higher level of competition. Following a poor start, they finished third out of four teams in the group stage and were eliminated, dropping into the Cup Winners' Cup. There, they advanced to the quarter-finals before being narrowly knocked out by Izvidač Ljubovski.

=== 2005–2006 ===
In the 2005–06 season, Gorenje reached the round of 16 in the 2005–06 EHF Champions League, where they were eliminated by French side Montpellier Handball after losing by just a single goal on aggregate.

In the domestic championship, the team sat in second place at the end of the regular season but ultimately finished third following defeats against RK Trimo Trebnje, RK Koper, and RK Gold Club. As a result, they concluded their two-year spell in the EHF Champions League and returned to the EHF Cup Winners' Cup.

=== 2007–2009 ===
Between 2006 and 2009, major changes took place at Gorenje Velenje. In 2007, the club appointed a new coach, Ivica Obrvan, on a four-year contract with a mission to secure the club's first championship title ahead of its upcoming 50th anniversary. That season, they finished as league runners-up. The following season, they slipped to third place, with Koper finishing second and Celje reclaiming the title. However, the season that went down in history was 2008–09. Coinciding with the club's 50th anniversary, Gorenje secured their first-ever Slovenian Championship title. With this triumph, they became one of only three teams to have won the national league between 1991 and 2009. In addition, Gorenje reached the final in the EHF Cup, where they lost to VfL Gummersbach.

=== 2009–2010 ===
In the 2009–10 season, Gorenje finished in second place in the Slovenian First League, just one point behind the league winners Celje. The team from Velenje also participated for the fourth time in the EHF Champions League during the season. After qualifying for the round of 16, they were defeated by the Spanish side BM Ciudad Real.

Gorenje Velenje vs Cimos Koper in 2013

=== 2010–2011 ===
Following 19 consecutive victories during the regular season of the Slovenian First League, Gorenje held a five-point lead with ten rounds remaining. However, things went downhill from there and the team's season rivals, Cimos Koper, caught up and won the title.

Through the season, Gorenje and Cimos played three matches. Gorenje won the first match (27–24) and Cimos won the other two (28–25 and 26–21). Consequently, Gorenje needed to defeat Koper by a margin of at least five goals in the fourth and final match to secure the championship. However, in the season finale played on their home court in Velenje, Koper cruised to a 34–23 victory to claim the title.

The team also competed in the EHF Cup, where they were knocked out in the quarter-finals by Frisch Auf Göppingen. The German side took a 33–20 victory in the first match, and despite Gorenje winning the return leg 26–22 at home, they were eliminated on aggregate.

== Club supporters ==
Gorenje Velenje supporters are called Šaleški graščaki, a group formed in 1994. Their biggest rivals are Florijani, the supporters of RK Celje.

=== Sponsorship ===
The club's main sponsor is the household appliance manufacturer Hisense Gorenje.

== Arena ==
RK Gorenje's home matches are played at the Red Hall, which has a capacity for 2,500 spectators. Built in 1974, the venue was refurbished in 1989, 1994, and again in 2004 for the 2004 European Men's Handball Championship.

== Rivalry ==
Gorenje's biggest rivals are RK Celje. The matches between the two sides are known as the "Savinja and Šalek Valley derby" (Slovene: Šaleško-savinjski derbi).

== Media ==
As the first and only handball club in Slovenia, RK Gorenje produced the television show RKG Pressing and a magazine called 9ka.

== Honours ==
- Slovenian Championship

Winners (5): 2008–09, 2011–12, 2012–13, 2020–21, 2023–24
Runners-up (14): 1993–94, 1995–96, 2003–04, 2004–05, 2006–07, 2009–10, 2010–11, 2013–14, 2014–15, 2015–16, 2016–17, 2018–19, 2022–23, 2024–25

- Slovenian Cup

Winners (3): 2002–03, 2018–19, 2021–22
Runners-up (8): 1994–95, 1996–97, 1997–98, 2000–01, 2006–07, 2010–11, 2012–13, 2014–15

- Slovenian Supercup

Winners (4): 2009, 2011, 2012, 2022
Runners-up (3): 2007, 2015, 2019

=== Yugoslavia ===
Under the Yugoslav Handball Federation there were many levels of competition in handball, including the First and Second Yugoslav Leagues, the Interrepublic and Republic Leagues, and regional competitions.

==== Regional, republic and interrepublic league ====
- 1964–65: Regional league – Celje, 1st place
- 1968–69: II. Republic League (Styria division), 1st place
- 1972–73: I. Republic League, 1st place
- 1980–81: I. Republic League, 1st place
- 1983–84: Interrepublic league, 3rd place
- 1984–85: I. Republic League, 1st place
- 1988–89: I. Republic League, 1st place

==== II. Yugoslav handball league ====
- 1990–91, 3rd place
