= Tabor Hall =

Sports venue in Maribor, Slovenia

- Interactive map of Tabor Hall
- Location: Maribor, Slovenia
- Coordinates: 46.549483°N 15.635703°E
- Owner: City Municipality of Maribor
- Operator: Šport Maribor
- Capacity: 3,261

Construction
- Groundbreaking: 1979
- Built: 1979–1984
- Opened: 4 July 1984
- Renovated: 2021–2022
- Cost: YUD 502 million
- Main contractor: Stavbar

Tenants
- Current: OK Maribor (volleyball); OK OTP Banka Branik (volleyball); Former: ŽKK Maribor (basketball); Branik Maribor (basketball); KK ZM Maribor Lumar (basketball); KK Maribor (basketball); ŽKD Maribor (basketball); ŠD Brezje (futsal); RK Maribor Branik (handball)

Tabor Hall (Slovene: Dvorana Tabor) is a multi-purpose sports venue in Maribor, Slovenia.

Opened in 1984, the venue has a capacity for 3,261 spectators. The complex consists of two halls; the main hall for basketball, volleyball, handball and mass events, and the smaller hall, which is mostly used for table tennis and bowling, and also has a fitness centre.
