= RD Ribnica =

- Full name: Rokometno društvo Ribnica
- Nickname: Suhorobarji
- Founded: 1956; 70 years ago
- Arena: Ribnica Sports Center
- Capacity: 600
- President: Pavel Fajfar
- Head coach: Jan Pucelj
- League: Slovenian First League
- 2025–26: Regular season: 9th of 12; Relegation group: 1st of 4
Home	Away

Rokometno društvo Ribnica or simply RD Ribnica is a Slovenian handball club from Ribnica that competes in the Slovenian First League.

== European record ==
All results (home and away) list Ribnica's goal tally first.

Season	Competition	Round	Club	Home	Away	Aggregate
2016–17	EHF Cup	R3	(Romania) SCM Politehnica Timișoara	30–19	22–27	52–46
2016–17	EHF Cup	Group Stage	(Germany) Füchse Berlin	20–25	30–38	4th place
2016–17	EHF Cup	Group Stage	(Denmark) GOG	31–36	27–32	4th place
2016–17	EHF Cup	Group Stage	(France) Saint-Raphaël Var Handball	24–31	22–26	4th place
2017–18	EHF Cup	R3	(Finland) Riihimäki Cocks	29–25	17–24	46–49
2018–19	EHF Cup	R2	(Iceland) Selfoss	30–27	26–32	56–59
2019–20	EHF Cup	R1	(Estonia) Põlva Serviti	32–22	27–26	59–48
2019–20	EHF Cup	R2	(Belarus) SKA Minsk	33–33	23–28	56–61
2022–23	EHF European Cup	R2	(Bosnia and Herzegovina) Borac m:tel	40–19	28–30	68–49
2022–23	EHF European Cup	R3	(Austria) HC Fivers Margareten	30–28	35–33	65–61
2022–23	EHF European Cup	L16	(Norway) Runar Sandefjord	34–32	29–38	63–70
