= RK Trimo Trebnje =

Slovenian handball team

- Full name: Rokometni klub Trimo Trebnje
- Nickname: Trebanjski levi (The Lions of Trebnje)
- Founded: 1983; 43 years ago
- Arena: OŠ Trebnje Hall
- Capacity: 800
- President: Anton Janc
- Head coach: Branko Tamše
- League: Slovenian First League
- 2025–26: Regular season: 2nd of 12; Playoffs: Third place
- Club colours
Home	Away

Rokometni klub Trimo Trebnje (English: Trimo Trebnje Handball Club), commonly referred to as Trimo Trebnje, is a Slovenian handball club from Trebnje which competes in the Slovenian First League.

== Honours ==
- Slovenian Championship

Runners-up (3): 2020–21, 2021–22, 2023–24

- Slovenian Cup

Winners (1): 2023–24
Runners-up (1): 2025–26

- Slovenian Supercup

Winners (1): 2026
