= RK Jeruzalem Ormož =

Jeruzalem Ormož
- Full name: Rokometni klub Jeruzalem Ormož
- Nickname(s): Plavi (The Blues); Vinarji (The Winemakers)
- Founded: 1957; 69 years ago
- Arena: Hardek Hall
- Capacity: 700
- President: Mladen Grabovac
- Head coach: Marko Bezjak
- League: Slovenian First League
- 2025–26: Regular season: 7th of 12; Playoffs: Seventh place
- Club colours
Home	Away

Rokometni klub Jeruzalem Ormož (English: Jeruzalem Ormož Handball Club), commonly referred to as RK Jeruzalem Ormož or simply Jeruzalem Ormož, is a Slovenian handball club from Ormož that competes in the Slovenian First League.
