= RK Celje =

Slovenian handball team

- Full name: Rokometni klub Celje
- Nickname: Pivovarji (The Brewers)
- Founded: 1946; 80 years ago
- Arena: Zlatorog Arena
- Capacity: 5,191
- President: Alenka Potočnik Anžič
- Head coach: Klemen Luzar
- League: Slovenian First League
- 2025–26: Regular season: 3rd of 12; Playoffs: Champions
- Club colours
Home	Away

Rokometni klub Celje (English: Celje Handball Club) or simply RK Celje, currently named Celje Pivovarna Laško (English: Celje Laško Brewery) due to sponsorship reasons, is a professional handball club from Celje, Slovenia. They were the winners of the Champions League in the 2003–04 season, becoming European club champions by defeating German side SG Flensburg-Handewitt in the final. Celje play their home games at Zlatorog Arena with a capacity for 5,191 spectators.

== History ==
The first handball match in Celje was played in 1942. After World War II, handball became the most popular sport in this Slovenian town. By May 1945, there were already two established teams in Celje: Celje and Olimp. The two teams were city rivals and played multiple matches against each other. Therefore, the year 1946 is marked as the official beginning of handball in Celje.

In 1947, the two rival teams finally united to form a new, central sports society, Kladivar Sports Association. Among the 21 sports that were incorporated in this association, was the handball club. The first season of the national league began in 1949, and Celje won the first title amongst the competition of six other teams without a defeat. The winning streak continued until 1954; with an exception of a single draw against other Slovenian teams. The knowledge and skill of the game was successfully transferred from a former German national handball player and a World War II prisoner of war Fritz Knoffler, and thanks to him, the Celje handball club was already one of the best in former Yugoslavia. The first Yugoslavian league season, where Celje handball club participated, was in 1950. But nevertheless, interest in the sport of large arena handball was slowly dying down in the 1950s. Most of the teams then turned to a small arena handball, which was becoming increasingly popular. The first generation of Celje players started to practice small arena handball, and played their first game on concrete, on the open, in front of the local railway station. They played against Ljubljana handball club and won with staggering 43–4. In 1953, the first such league season in Yugoslavia had begun, but the Celje team only took a disappointing last place among the six teams. The Celje handball club wasn't so successful as anticipated, for they were playing in a regional league until 1961, when after two failed qualifications in 1959 and 1960, finally managed to enter the First Republic (Slovenian) League. With this event, the rise of the small arena handball (handball as we know it today) in Celje began.

In the meantime, talented players from the youngster team of Celje (such as Persinger, Telič, the Goršič brothers etc.) led by Jože Kuzma with the help of Tone Goršič and Franc Ramskugler had become 4 time consecutive vice-champions of the youngster First Republican League. In the winter of 1964, the new city rivals-ŽRK Celje and Partizan Celje, unified once again under the name of ŽRK Celje. In the same year, ŽRK Celje became the Slovenian runners-up. One year later, they won the Slovenian national cup against their archrivals, Ljubljana, with the score of 17–11. In the 1965–66 season, Celje finally became the Slovenian republic first league champions, and after successful qualifications one season later in Slavonski Brod, finally became members of the elite Yugoslav Handball Championship. The maiden season in the first Yugoslavian league wasn't so successful, as Celje was relegated back to the republic league (the Slovenian First Republican league was basically the Yugoslavian second division), but managed to come back to the first league the following season. Jure Koren was the first Celje player who was drafted in the Yugoslavia national handball team. Celje managed to stay in the first division for three seasons, when it was once again relegated to a newly established Second Yugoslavian Federal Handball League in 1971. Tone Goršič and Franc Ramskugler created a new generation of players, such as Peunik, Luskar, Mrovlje and others, with the support of more experienced players such as Marguč, Koren, Levstik and Pučko. The Celje team was playing in the second division for four full seasons, gaining valuable experience and skill. The work on the young players had paid off, for in 1976, in the new Golovec Hall, Celje beat Velež Mostar in the qualifications, and once again became a member of the first division. The success of regaining a place amongst the elite obviously had a positive impact, because the Celje team managed to come to three Yugoslavian Cup finals, although all three of them were lost to Partizan in 1976, Medveščak in 1978 and Metaloplastika in 1980. The star of this successful team was Vlado Bojović, who was also successful in the national team, where he played 108 matches scoring 124 goals. He was the captain of the national team nine times, and participated on two world cups in 1978 and 1982. He was also part of the team on 1976 Montreal Summer Olympics, making him the most successful Slovenian player, who played for Celje. The youngster team of Celje, on the other hand, were already the first division champions in 1977, 1979, 1980 and 1982, and vice-champions in 1976, 1978, 1981, 1987 and 1988.

In 1978, the Slovenian company Aero Celje became the sponsor of the team. After two consecutive seventh places in the first division, Celje was again relegated in the 1978–79 season, came back in 1983–84 season, but was relegated back into the second division the same year. A seven-year crisis occurred, when Celje was struggling even in the second division until the season 1988–89, when they were preparing a new, better team, which would be capable of regaining a position in the first division.

In 1990, Pivovarna Laško became a new sponsor of the club and since then it has been called Celje Pivovarna Laško. In the 1990–91 season, the team won the second division and once again earned a promotion to the first Yugoslavian league. However, Slovenia declared its independence from Yugoslavia on 26 June 1991, and after a brief war, the Slovenian league was formed. In the first ten editions of the league between 1992 and 2001, Celje won the title every season. In the 2003–04 season, Celje became the European champions after defeating SG Flensburg-Handewitt in the final with an aggregate score 62–58 over two legs.

== Team ==
=== Current squad ===
Squad for the 2026–27 season

Goalkeepers

- 1 (Slovenia) Jan Češek
- 12 (Slovenia) Matevž Mlakar
- 99 (Slovenia) Gal Gaberšek

Left wingers

- 6 (Slovenia) Tadej Mazej
- 88 (Slovenia) Filip Rakita

Right wingers

- 11 (Slovenia) Žiga Grabar
- 30 (Slovenia) Gašper Marguč

Line players

- 44 (Colombia) Jesus Hurtado Vergara
- 48 (Slovenia) Lucijan Korošec
- 89 (Slovenia) Mattis Heiss

Left backs

- 7 (Slovenia) Žan Kovač
- 22 (Slovenia) Jaka Soršak
- 24 (Slovenia) Uroš Milićević
- 69 (Slovenia) Lun Ključanin

Central backs

- 8 (Slovenia) Aljuš Anžič
- 13 (Slovenia) Bor Bradeško

Right backs

- 10 (North Macedonia) Dimitar Uzunchev
- 19 (Slovenia) Mai Marguč
- 55 (Slovenia) Žiga Mlakar (c)

== Honours ==
League

- Slovenian First League

Winners (27): 1991–92, 1992–93, 1993–94, 1994–95, 1995–96, 1996–97, 1997–98, 1998–99, 1999–2000, 2000–01, 2002–03, 2003–04, 2004–05, 2005–06, 2006–07, 2007–08, 2009–10, 2013–14, 2014–15, 2015–16, 2016–17, 2017–18, 2018–19, 2019–20, 2021–22, 2022–23, 2025–26
Runners-up (3): 2001–02, 2011–12, 2012–13

Cup

- Slovenian Cup

Winners (23): 1991–92, 1992–93, 1993–94, 1994–95, 1995–96, 1996–97, 1997–98, 1998–99, 1999–2000, 2000–01, 2003–04, 2005–06, 2006–07, 2009–10, 2011–12, 2012–13, 2013–14, 2014–15, 2015–16, 2016–17, 2017–18, 2022–23, 2025–26
Runners-up (3): 2001–02, 2004–05, 2008–09

- Slovenian Supercup

Winners (8): 2007, 2010, 2014, 2015, 2016, 2017, 2019, 2023
Runners-up (4): 2012, 2018, 2022, 2026

- Yugoslav Cup

Runners-up (3): 1975–76, 1977–78, 1979–80

International

- EHF Champions League

Winners (1): 2003–04
Semi-finals (6): 1996–97, 1997–98, 1998–99, 1999–2000, 2000–01, 2004–05

- EHF Supercup

Winners (1): 2004
Runners-up (1): 2007

- EHF Cup Winners' Cup

Semi-finals: 2002–03, 2011–12

- EHF European Cup

Semi-finals: 2025–26

- SEHA League

Third place: 2017–18
