= 2013–14 EHF Champions League group stage =

This article describes the group stage of the 2013–14 EHF Champions League.

== Format ==
The 24 teams were split into four groups, consisting of six teams. Each team played a home and away game against all opponents in the group. The first four ranked teams advanced to the knockout stage.

== Seedings ==
The draw for the group stage took place at the Gloriette in Vienna on 28 June 2013 at 20:15 local time. A total of 24 teams were drawn into four groups of six. Teams were divided into six pots, based on EHF coefficients. Clubs from the same pot or the same association could not be drawn into the same group, except the wild card tournament winner, which did not enjoy any protection.

Pot 1	Pot 2	Pot 3	Pot 4	Pot 5	Pot 6
(Germany) Kiel (Spain) Barcelona (Denmark) Aalborg (Hungary) Veszprém	(Poland) Kielce (Croatia) Zagreb (France) Paris St-Germain (Slovenia) Velenje	(Germany) Flensburg (Poland) Płock (Russia) St. Petersburg (North Macedonia) Vardar Skopje	(Denmark) Kolding (Switzerland) Thun (Germany) Rhein-Neckar (Spain) Logroño	(France) Dunkerque (Slovenia) Celje (Sweden) Halmstad (Belarus) Dinamo-Minsk	(Ukraine) Motor (Portugal) Porto (North Macedonia) Metalurg Skopje (Germany) Hamburg

== Group A ==
Team	Pld	W	D	L	GF	GA	GD	Pts
(Hungary) MKB-MVM Veszprém	10	8	1	1	303	243	+60	17
(Germany) Rhein-Neckar Löwen	10	7	2	1	305	252	+53	16
(Slovenia) Celje	10	4	1	5	269	272	−3	9
(Ukraine) Motor Zaporizhzhia	10	4	1	5	277	296	−19	9
(Croatia) Zagreb	10	4	0	6	267	282	−15	8
(Russia) St. Petersburg	10	0	1	9	216	292	−76	1

19 September 2013; 19:00	Rhein-Neckar Löwen (Germany)	31 – 31	(Ukraine) Motor Zaporizhzhia	Sportzentrum Harres, Sankt Leon-Rot; Attendance: 2,000; Referees: Santos, Fonseca (POR)
19 September 2013; 19:00	Groetzki 7	(15–13)	Onufryienko 8	Sportzentrum Harres, Sankt Leon-Rot; Attendance: 2,000; Referees: Santos, Fonseca (POR)
19 September 2013; 19:00	2× (yellow card) 2× (suspension)	Report	3× (yellow card) 4× (suspension)	Sportzentrum Harres, Sankt Leon-Rot; Attendance: 2,000; Referees: Santos, Fonseca (POR)

19 September 2013; 20:00	St. Petersburg (Russia)	15 – 28	(Hungary) MKB-MVM Veszprém	Sportkompleks "Ubileyniy", Saint Petersburg; Attendance: 2,500; Referees: Dinu, Din (ROU)
19 September 2013; 20:00	six players 2	(7–12)	Ilić 8	Sportkompleks "Ubileyniy", Saint Petersburg; Attendance: 2,500; Referees: Dinu, Din (ROU)
19 September 2013; 20:00	3× (yellow card) 4× (suspension)	Report	3× (yellow card) 5× (suspension)	Sportkompleks "Ubileyniy", Saint Petersburg; Attendance: 2,500; Referees: Dinu, Din (ROU)

21 September 2013; 18:00	Zagreb (Croatia)	24 – 21	(Slovenia) Celje	Arena Zagreb, Zagreb; Attendance: 6,570; Referees: Stark, Stefan (ROU)
21 September 2013; 18:00	Mandalinić 7	(13–10)	Marguč, Zelenović 5	Arena Zagreb, Zagreb; Attendance: 6,570; Referees: Stark, Stefan (ROU)
21 September 2013; 18:00	2× (yellow card) 4× (suspension)	Report	3× (yellow card) 3× (suspension)	Arena Zagreb, Zagreb; Attendance: 6,570; Referees: Stark, Stefan (ROU)

26 September 2013; 19:00	Motor Zaporizhzhia (Ukraine)	31 – 30	(Croatia) Zagreb	Sport Complex Lokomotiv, Kharkiv; Attendance: 1,900; Referees: Nikolov, Nachevski (MKD)
26 September 2013; 19:00	Burka, Onufryienko 7	(18–15)	five players 5	Sport Complex Lokomotiv, Kharkiv; Attendance: 1,900; Referees: Nikolov, Nachevski (MKD)
26 September 2013; 19:00	3× (yellow card) 1× (suspension)	Report	3× (yellow card) 3× (suspension)	Sport Complex Lokomotiv, Kharkiv; Attendance: 1,900; Referees: Nikolov, Nachevski (MKD)

28 September 2013; 20:30	Celje (Slovenia)	29 – 22	(Russia) St. Petersburg	Zlatorog Arena, Celje; Attendance: 1,521; Referees: Kurtagic, Wetterwik (SWE)
28 September 2013; 20:30	Zelenović 7	(15–10)	Polyakov 5	Zlatorog Arena, Celje; Attendance: 1,521; Referees: Kurtagic, Wetterwik (SWE)
28 September 2013; 20:30	3× (yellow card) 2× (suspension)	Report	3× (yellow card) 4× (suspension)	Zlatorog Arena, Celje; Attendance: 1,521; Referees: Kurtagic, Wetterwik (SWE)

29 September 2013; 17:00	MKB-MVM Veszprém (Hungary)	30 – 29	(Germany) Rhein-Neckar Löwen	Veszprém Aréna, Veszprém; Attendance: 5,000; Referees: Dentz, Reibel (FRA)
29 September 2013; 17:00	Ilić 9	(17–14)	Gensheimer 6	Veszprém Aréna, Veszprém; Attendance: 5,000; Referees: Dentz, Reibel (FRA)
29 September 2013; 17:00	3× (yellow card) 5× (suspension)	Report	3× (yellow card) 2× (suspension)	Veszprém Aréna, Veszprém; Attendance: 5,000; Referees: Dentz, Reibel (FRA)

10 October 2013; 19:00	MKB-MVM Veszprém (Hungary)	44 – 27	(Ukraine) Motor Zaporizhzhia	Veszprém Aréna, Veszprém; Attendance: 4,900; Referees: Pandzić, Mosorinski (SRB)
10 October 2013; 19:00	Nagy 7	(20–13)	Burka 6	Veszprém Aréna, Veszprém; Attendance: 4,900; Referees: Pandzić, Mosorinski (SRB)
10 October 2013; 19:00	3× (yellow card) 2× (suspension)	Report	3× (yellow card) 5× (suspension)	Veszprém Aréna, Veszprém; Attendance: 4,900; Referees: Pandzić, Mosorinski (SRB)

12 October 2013; 16:00	St. Petersburg (Russia)	24 – 35	(Croatia) Zagreb	Sportkompleks "Ubileyniy", Saint Petersburg; Attendance: 1,200; Referees: Dentz, Reibel (FRA)
12 October 2013; 16:00	Nasyrov, Novoselov 4	(16–15)	Horvat, Stepančić 7	Sportkompleks "Ubileyniy", Saint Petersburg; Attendance: 1,200; Referees: Dentz, Reibel (FRA)
12 October 2013; 16:00	3× (yellow card) 5× (suspension)	Report	3× (yellow card) 2× (suspension)	Sportkompleks "Ubileyniy", Saint Petersburg; Attendance: 1,200; Referees: Dentz, Reibel (FRA)

12 October 2013; 16:30	Celje (Slovenia)	25 – 28	(Germany) Rhein-Neckar Löwen	Zlatorog Arena, Celje; Attendance: 1,800; Referees: Covalciuc, Covalciuc (MDA)
12 October 2013; 16:30	Zelenović, Žuran 5	(7–13)	Gensheimer 10	Zlatorog Arena, Celje; Attendance: 1,800; Referees: Covalciuc, Covalciuc (MDA)
12 October 2013; 16:30	2× (yellow card) 4× (suspension)	Report	3× (yellow card) 5× (suspension) 1× (red card)	Zlatorog Arena, Celje; Attendance: 1,800; Referees: Covalciuc, Covalciuc (MDA)

17 October 2013; 19:00	Motor Zaporizhzhia (Ukraine)	29 – 32	(Slovenia) Celje	Sport Complex Lokomotiv, Kharkiv; Attendance: 1,800; Referees: Baranowski, Lemanowicz (POL)
17 October 2013; 19:00	Onufryienko, Skopintsev 8	(14–11)	Marguč 8	Sport Complex Lokomotiv, Kharkiv; Attendance: 1,800; Referees: Baranowski, Lemanowicz (POL)
17 October 2013; 19:00	3× (yellow card) 4× (suspension)	Report	3× (yellow card) 5× (suspension)	Sport Complex Lokomotiv, Kharkiv; Attendance: 1,800; Referees: Baranowski, Lemanowicz (POL)

17 October 2013; 20:30	Rhein-Neckar Löwen (Germany)	31 – 17	(Russia) St. Petersburg	Sportzentrum Harres, Sankt Leon-Rot; Attendance: 1,863; Referees: Erdoğan, Özdeniz (TUR)
17 October 2013; 20:30	Gensheimer 6	(14–8)	three players 3	Sportzentrum Harres, Sankt Leon-Rot; Attendance: 1,863; Referees: Erdoğan, Özdeniz (TUR)
17 October 2013; 20:30	2× (yellow card) 6× (suspension)	Report	3× (yellow card) 4× (suspension)	Sportzentrum Harres, Sankt Leon-Rot; Attendance: 1,863; Referees: Erdoğan, Özdeniz (TUR)

20 October 2013; 18:00	Zagreb (Croatia)	22 – 33	(Hungary) MKB-MVM Veszprém	Arena Zagreb, Zagreb; Attendance: 11,000; Referees: Gjeding, Hansen (DEN)
20 October 2013; 18:00	Mandalinić 6	(8–15)	Nagy 6	Arena Zagreb, Zagreb; Attendance: 11,000; Referees: Gjeding, Hansen (DEN)
20 October 2013; 18:00	3× (yellow card) 1× (suspension)	Report	2× (yellow card) 2× (suspension)	Arena Zagreb, Zagreb; Attendance: 11,000; Referees: Gjeding, Hansen (DEN)

14 November 2013; 20:30	Rhein-Neckar Löwen (Germany)	34 – 26	(Croatia) Zagreb	Sportzentrum Harres, Sankt Leon-Rot; Attendance: 2,000; Referees: López, Ramírez (ESP)
14 November 2013; 20:30	Gensheimer 7	(21–11)	Mandalinić 9	Sportzentrum Harres, Sankt Leon-Rot; Attendance: 2,000; Referees: López, Ramírez (ESP)
14 November 2013; 20:30	3× (yellow card) 4× (suspension)	Report	2× (yellow card) 5× (suspension)	Sportzentrum Harres, Sankt Leon-Rot; Attendance: 2,000; Referees: López, Ramírez (ESP)

17 November 2013; 19:00	Motor Zaporizhzhia (Ukraine)	29 – 24	(Russia) St. Petersburg	Sport Complex Lokomotiv, Kharkiv; Attendance: 1,800; Referees: Pavićević, Ražnatović (MNE)
17 November 2013; 19:00	Onufryienko 7	(15–9)	Kuzmin 5	Sport Complex Lokomotiv, Kharkiv; Attendance: 1,800; Referees: Pavićević, Ražnatović (MNE)
17 November 2013; 19:00	3× (yellow card) 3× (suspension)	Report	3× (yellow card) 2× (suspension)	Sport Complex Lokomotiv, Kharkiv; Attendance: 1,800; Referees: Pavićević, Ražnatović (MNE)

17 November 2013; 20:00	Celje (Slovenia)	26 – 31	(Hungary) MKB-MVM Veszprém	Zlatorog Arena, Celje; Attendance: 4,300; Referees: Hansen, Pettersen (NOR)
17 November 2013; 20:00	Slišković 8	(14–15)	Ugalde 7	Zlatorog Arena, Celje; Attendance: 4,300; Referees: Hansen, Pettersen (NOR)
17 November 2013; 20:00	3× (yellow card) 5× (suspension)	Report	3× (yellow card) 3× (suspension) 1× (red card)	Zlatorog Arena, Celje; Attendance: 4,300; Referees: Hansen, Pettersen (NOR)

21 November 2013; 19:30	St. Petersburg (Russia)	18 – 24	(Ukraine) Motor Zaporizhzhia	Sportkompleks "Ubileyniy", Saint Petersburg; Attendance: 1,500; Referees: Konjičanin, Konjičanin (BIH)
21 November 2013; 19:30	three players 3	(10–14)	Skopintsev 5	Sportkompleks "Ubileyniy", Saint Petersburg; Attendance: 1,500; Referees: Konjičanin, Konjičanin (BIH)
21 November 2013; 19:30	3× (yellow card) 3× (suspension)	Report	3× (yellow card) 4× (suspension)	Sportkompleks "Ubileyniy", Saint Petersburg; Attendance: 1,500; Referees: Konjičanin, Konjičanin (BIH)

23 November 2013; 18:00	Zagreb (Croatia)	24 – 28	(Germany) Rhein-Neckar Löwen	Arena Zagreb, Zagreb; Attendance: 6,000; Referees: Gousko, Repkin (BLR)
23 November 2013; 18:00	Matulić, Stepančić 6	(12–13)	Gensheimer 6	Arena Zagreb, Zagreb; Attendance: 6,000; Referees: Gousko, Repkin (BLR)
23 November 2013; 18:00	3× (yellow card) 4× (suspension)	Report	2× (yellow card) 2× (suspension)	Arena Zagreb, Zagreb; Attendance: 6,000; Referees: Gousko, Repkin (BLR)

23 November 2013; 18:45	MKB-MVM Veszprém (Hungary)	27 – 26	(Slovenia) Celje	Veszprém Aréna, Veszprém; Attendance: 5,019; Referees: Cohen, Peretz (ISR)
23 November 2013; 18:45	Iváncsik 6	(13–10)	Skube 7	Veszprém Aréna, Veszprém; Attendance: 5,019; Referees: Cohen, Peretz (ISR)
23 November 2013; 18:45	3× (yellow card) 4× (suspension)	Report	3× (yellow card) 5× (suspension) 1× (red card)	Veszprém Aréna, Veszprém; Attendance: 5,019; Referees: Cohen, Peretz (ISR)

28 November 2013; 19:30	Motor Zaporizhzhia (Ukraine)	26 – 32	(Germany) Rhein-Neckar Löwen	Sport Complex Lokomotiv, Kharkiv; Attendance: 2,000; Referees: Dinu, Din (ROU)
28 November 2013; 19:30	Ostroushko 8	(10–15)	Gensheimer 7	Sport Complex Lokomotiv, Kharkiv; Attendance: 2,000; Referees: Dinu, Din (ROU)
28 November 2013; 19:30	3× (yellow card) 4× (suspension)	Report	3× (yellow card) 5× (suspension)	Sport Complex Lokomotiv, Kharkiv; Attendance: 2,000; Referees: Dinu, Din (ROU)

30 November 2013; 18:15	MKB-MVM Veszprém (Hungary)	29 – 20	(Russia) St. Petersburg	Veszprém Aréna, Veszprém; Attendance: 5,019; Referees: Opava, Válek (CZE)
30 November 2013; 18:15	Iváncsik 6	(13–7)	Kalarash, Nasyrov 4	Veszprém Aréna, Veszprém; Attendance: 5,019; Referees: Opava, Válek (CZE)
30 November 2013; 18:15	2× (yellow card) 1× (suspension)	Report	3× (yellow card) 3× (suspension)	Veszprém Aréna, Veszprém; Attendance: 5,019; Referees: Opava, Válek (CZE)

30 November 2013; 20:30	Celje (Slovenia)	26 – 20	(Croatia) Zagreb	Zlatorog Arena, Celje; Attendance: 5,000; Referees: Brunovský, Čanda (SVK)
30 November 2013; 20:30	Marguč, Slišković 6	(14–11)	Horvat 5	Zlatorog Arena, Celje; Attendance: 5,000; Referees: Brunovský, Čanda (SVK)
30 November 2013; 20:30	3× (yellow card) 5× (suspension)	Report	3× (yellow card) 2× (suspension)	Zlatorog Arena, Celje; Attendance: 5,000; Referees: Brunovský, Čanda (SVK)

8 February 2014; 16:00	St. Petersburg (Russia)	29 – 29	(Slovenia) Celje	Sportkompleks "Ubileyniy", Saint Petersburg; Attendance: 1,320; Referees: Bounouara, Sami (FRA)
8 February 2014; 16:00	Kalarash 6	(16–13)	Marguč 9	Sportkompleks "Ubileyniy", Saint Petersburg; Attendance: 1,320; Referees: Bounouara, Sami (FRA)
8 February 2014; 16:00	1× (yellow card) 7× (suspension)	Report	3× (yellow card) 4× (suspension)	Sportkompleks "Ubileyniy", Saint Petersburg; Attendance: 1,320; Referees: Bounouara, Sami (FRA)

8 February 2014; 18:00	Zagreb (Croatia)	33 – 27	(Ukraine) Motor Zaporizhzhia	Arena Zagreb, Zagreb; Attendance: 5,236; Referees: Horáček, Novotný (CZE)
8 February 2014; 18:00	Šandrk 9	(16–16)	Onufryienko 7	Arena Zagreb, Zagreb; Attendance: 5,236; Referees: Horáček, Novotný (CZE)
8 February 2014; 18:00	3× (yellow card) 5× (suspension) 1× (red card)	Report	3× (yellow card) 6× (suspension)	Arena Zagreb, Zagreb; Attendance: 5,236; Referees: Horáček, Novotný (CZE)

9 February 2014; 19:00	Rhein-Neckar Löwen (Germany)	25 – 25	(Hungary) MKB-MVM Veszprém	SAP Arena, Mannheim; Attendance: 7,125; Referees: Nikolić, Stojković (SRB)
9 February 2014; 19:00	Gensheimer 10	(12–13)	Ilić 11	SAP Arena, Mannheim; Attendance: 7,125; Referees: Nikolić, Stojković (SRB)
9 February 2014; 19:00	3× (yellow card) 1× (suspension)	Report	3× (yellow card) 3× (suspension)	SAP Arena, Mannheim; Attendance: 7,125; Referees: Nikolić, Stojković (SRB)

15 February 2014; 19:00	MKB-MVM Veszprém (Hungary)	34 – 27	(Croatia) Zagreb	Veszprém Aréna, Veszprém; Attendance: 5,019; Referees: Gatelis, Mažeika (LTU)
15 February 2014; 19:00	Ilić 8	(19–11)	Horvat 5	Veszprém Aréna, Veszprém; Attendance: 5,019; Referees: Gatelis, Mažeika (LTU)
15 February 2014; 19:00	3× (yellow card) 4× (suspension)	Report	3× (yellow card) 4× (suspension)	Veszprém Aréna, Veszprém; Attendance: 5,019; Referees: Gatelis, Mažeika (LTU)

15 February 2014; 20:00	St. Petersburg (Russia)	23 – 32	(Germany) Rhein-Neckar Löwen	Sportkompleks "Ubileyniy", Saint Petersburg; Attendance: 1,000; Referees: Olesen, Pedersen (DEN)
15 February 2014; 20:00	Kalarash 5	(10–18)	Sigurmannsson 7	Sportkompleks "Ubileyniy", Saint Petersburg; Attendance: 1,000; Referees: Olesen, Pedersen (DEN)
15 February 2014; 20:00	2× (yellow card) 2× (suspension)	Report	3× (yellow card) 2× (suspension)	Sportkompleks "Ubileyniy", Saint Petersburg; Attendance: 1,000; Referees: Olesen, Pedersen (DEN)

15 February 2014; 20:30	Celje (Slovenia)	30 – 27	(Ukraine) Motor Zaporizhzhia	Zlatorog Arena, Celje; Attendance: 3,000; Referees: Stark, Ştefan (ROU)
15 February 2014; 20:30	Marguč 10	(19–15)	Burka 7	Zlatorog Arena, Celje; Attendance: 3,000; Referees: Stark, Ştefan (ROU)
15 February 2014; 20:30	3× (yellow card) 5× (suspension)	Report	3× (yellow card) 5× (suspension)	Zlatorog Arena, Celje; Attendance: 3,000; Referees: Stark, Ştefan (ROU)

20 February 2014; 19:00	Rhein-Neckar Löwen (Germany)	35 – 25	(Slovenia) Celje	Sportzentrum Harres, Sankt Leon-Rot; Attendance: 1,509; Referees: Stenrand, Birch (DEN)
20 February 2014; 19:00	three players 5	(19–12)	Marguč 6	Sportzentrum Harres, Sankt Leon-Rot; Attendance: 1,509; Referees: Stenrand, Birch (DEN)
20 February 2014; 19:00	3× (yellow card) 5× (suspension)	Report	3× (yellow card) 4× (suspension)	Sportzentrum Harres, Sankt Leon-Rot; Attendance: 1,509; Referees: Stenrand, Birch (DEN)

22 February 2014; 17:00	Motor Zaporizhzhia (Ukraine)	25 – 21	(Hungary) MKB-MVM Veszprém	Sport Complex Lokomotiv, Kharkiv; Attendance: 1,500; Referees: Kurtagic, Wetterwik (SWE)
22 February 2014; 17:00	Skopintsev 5	(13–13)	Ilić 6	Sport Complex Lokomotiv, Kharkiv; Attendance: 1,500; Referees: Kurtagic, Wetterwik (SWE)
22 February 2014; 17:00	1× (yellow card) 4× (suspension)	Report	3× (yellow card) 9× (suspension) 1× (red card)	Sport Complex Lokomotiv, Kharkiv; Attendance: 1,500; Referees: Kurtagic, Wetterwik (SWE)

22 February 2014; 19:00	Zagreb (Croatia)	26 – 24	(Russia) St. Petersburg	Arena Zagreb, Zagreb; Attendance: 7,000; Referees: Stoļarovs, Līcis (LAT)
22 February 2014; 19:00	Valčić 7	(15–14)	Blagonadezhdin, Pyshkin 5	Arena Zagreb, Zagreb; Attendance: 7,000; Referees: Stoļarovs, Līcis (LAT)
22 February 2014; 19:00	3× (yellow card) 4× (suspension)	Report	1× (yellow card) 3× (suspension) 1× (red card)	Arena Zagreb, Zagreb; Attendance: 7,000; Referees: Stoļarovs, Līcis (LAT)

== Group B ==
Team	Pld	W	D	L	GF	GA	GD	Pts
(Germany) THW Kiel	10	8	1	1	298	268	+30	17
(Denmark) KIF Kolding	10	7	0	3	249	240	+9	14
(Poland) Vive Targi Kielce	10	6	1	3	307	276	+31	13
(Poland) Wisła Płock	10	4	0	6	275	277	−2	8
(Portugal) Porto	10	2	1	7	241	278	−37	5
(France) Dunkerque	10	1	1	8	237	268	−31	3

22 September 2013; 17:00	Wisła Płock (Poland)	33 – 34	(Germany) THW Kiel	Orlen Arena, Płock; Attendance: 5,000; Referees: Krstić, Ljubić (SLO)
22 September 2013; 17:00	Jurkiewicz 7	(14–14)	Jícha 8	Orlen Arena, Płock; Attendance: 5,000; Referees: Krstić, Ljubić (SLO)
22 September 2013; 17:00	3× (yellow card) 3× (suspension)	Report	3× (yellow card) 6× (suspension)	Orlen Arena, Płock; Attendance: 5,000; Referees: Krstić, Ljubić (SLO)

22 September 2013; 17:00	KIF Kolding (Denmark)	25 – 20	(Portugal) Porto	Kolding Hallen, Kolding; Attendance: 2,504; Referees: Dobrovits, Tájok (HUN)
22 September 2013; 17:00	Karlsson, Rocas 5	(15–10)	Rocha 5	Kolding Hallen, Kolding; Attendance: 2,504; Referees: Dobrovits, Tájok (HUN)
22 September 2013; 17:00	2× (yellow card) 2× (suspension)	Report	2× (yellow card) 1× (suspension)	Kolding Hallen, Kolding; Attendance: 2,504; Referees: Dobrovits, Tájok (HUN)

22 September 2013; 19:00	Vive Targi Kielce (Poland)	33 – 23	(France) Dunkerque	Hala Legionów, Kielce; Attendance: 4,000; Referees: Pandzić, Mosorinski (SRB)
22 September 2013; 19:00	Štrlek 9	(15–11)	Butto 5	Hala Legionów, Kielce; Attendance: 4,000; Referees: Pandzić, Mosorinski (SRB)
22 September 2013; 19:00	3× (yellow card) 5× (suspension)	Report	3× (yellow card) 2× (suspension)	Hala Legionów, Kielce; Attendance: 4,000; Referees: Pandzić, Mosorinski (SRB)

28 September 2013; 16:00	Dunkerque (France)	25 – 28	(Poland) Wisła Płock	Stade des Flandres, Dunkerque; Attendance: 2,050; Referees: Lorente, Serradilla (ESP)
28 September 2013; 16:00	Soudry 7	(13–15)	Ghionea 12	Stade des Flandres, Dunkerque; Attendance: 2,050; Referees: Lorente, Serradilla (ESP)
28 September 2013; 16:00	3× (yellow card) 6× (suspension) 1× (red card)	Report	3× (yellow card) 5× (suspension)	Stade des Flandres, Dunkerque; Attendance: 2,050; Referees: Lorente, Serradilla (ESP)

29 September 2013; 15:00	THW Kiel (Germany)	29 – 26	(Denmark) KIF Kolding	Sparkassen-Arena, Kiel; Attendance: 8,500; Referees: López, Ramírez (ESP)
29 September 2013; 15:00	Jícha 11	(12–14)	Karlsson 9	Sparkassen-Arena, Kiel; Attendance: 8,500; Referees: López, Ramírez (ESP)
29 September 2013; 15:00	3× (yellow card) 5× (suspension) 1× (red card)	Report	2× (yellow card) 6× (suspension)	Sparkassen-Arena, Kiel; Attendance: 8,500; Referees: López, Ramírez (ESP)

29 September 2014; 15:00	Vive Targi Kielce (Poland)	35 – 23	(Portugal) Porto	Hala Legionów, Kielce; Attendance: 4,000; Referees: Cohen, Peretz (ISR)
29 September 2014; 15:00	Jurecki 6	(16–13)	Duarte 6	Hala Legionów, Kielce; Attendance: 4,000; Referees: Cohen, Peretz (ISR)
29 September 2014; 15:00	3× (yellow card) 3× (suspension)	Report	3× (yellow card) 3× (suspension)	Hala Legionów, Kielce; Attendance: 4,000; Referees: Cohen, Peretz (ISR)

12 October 2013; 20:15	Porto (Portugal)	27 – 31	(Germany) THW Kiel	Dragão Caixa, Porto; Attendance: 2,115; Referees: Nikolić, Stojković (SRB)
12 October 2013; 20:15	Duarte 9	(17–16)	Vujin 9	Dragão Caixa, Porto; Attendance: 2,115; Referees: Nikolić, Stojković (SRB)
12 October 2013; 20:15	3× (yellow card) 4× (suspension) 1× (red card)	Report	3× (yellow card) 4× (suspension)	Dragão Caixa, Porto; Attendance: 2,115; Referees: Nikolić, Stojković (SRB)

13 October 2013; 17:00	Dunkerque (France)	18 – 20	(Denmark) KIF Kolding	Stade des Flandres, Dunkerque; Attendance: 2,429; Referees: Krstić, Ljubić (SLO)
13 October 2013; 17:00	Soudry 5	(7–12)	Andersson 7	Stade des Flandres, Dunkerque; Attendance: 2,429; Referees: Krstić, Ljubić (SLO)
13 October 2013; 17:00	3× (yellow card) 1× (suspension)	Report	3× (yellow card) 2× (suspension)	Stade des Flandres, Dunkerque; Attendance: 2,429; Referees: Krstić, Ljubić (SLO)

13 October 2013; 19:30	Wisła Płock (Poland)	28 – 30	(Poland) Vive Targi Kielce	Orlen Arena, Płock; Attendance: 5,467; Referees: Togstad, Kristiansen (NOR)
13 October 2013; 19:30	Nenadić 7	(17–15)	Aguinagalde 9	Orlen Arena, Płock; Attendance: 5,467; Referees: Togstad, Kristiansen (NOR)
13 October 2013; 19:30	3× (yellow card) 4× (suspension)	Report	3× (yellow card) 4× (suspension)	Orlen Arena, Płock; Attendance: 5,467; Referees: Togstad, Kristiansen (NOR)

19 October 2013; 18:15	Vive Targi Kielce (Poland)	34 – 29	(Germany) THW Kiel	Hala Legionów, Kielce; Attendance: 4,200; Referees: Gubica, Milošević (CRO)
19 October 2013; 18:15	Jurecki 8	(17–11)	Jícha 7	Hala Legionów, Kielce; Attendance: 4,200; Referees: Gubica, Milošević (CRO)
19 October 2013; 18:15	3× (yellow card) 3× (suspension)	Report	3× (yellow card) 2× (suspension)	Hala Legionów, Kielce; Attendance: 4,200; Referees: Gubica, Milošević (CRO)

20 October 2013; 14:00	Porto (Portugal)	22 – 21	(France) Dunkerque	Dragão Caixa, Porto; Attendance: 1,102; Referees: Horáček, Novotný (CZE)
20 October 2013; 14:00	Rocha 6	(13–11)	Afgour, Soudry 4	Dragão Caixa, Porto; Attendance: 1,102; Referees: Horáček, Novotný (CZE)
20 October 2013; 14:00	3× (yellow card) 6× (suspension)	Report	3× (yellow card) 3× (suspension)	Dragão Caixa, Porto; Attendance: 1,102; Referees: Horáček, Novotný (CZE)

20 October 2013; 17:00	KIF Kolding (Denmark)	23 – 22	(Poland) Wisła Płock	Kolding Hallen, Kolding; Attendance: 2,628; Referees: Pavićević, Ražnatović (MNE)
20 October 2013; 17:00	Spellerberg 6	(13–11)	Ghionea 7	Kolding Hallen, Kolding; Attendance: 2,628; Referees: Pavićević, Ražnatović (MNE)
20 October 2013; 17:00	3× (yellow card) 3× (suspension)	Report	3× (yellow card) 2× (suspension)	Kolding Hallen, Kolding; Attendance: 2,628; Referees: Pavićević, Ražnatović (MNE)

16 November 2013; 19:30	Porto (Portugal)	20 – 24	(Poland) Wisła Płock	Dragão Caixa, Porto; Attendance: 1,592; Referees: Zotin, Volodkov (RUS)
16 November 2013; 19:30	Ferraz 6	(9–14)	Nenadić 6	Dragão Caixa, Porto; Attendance: 1,592; Referees: Zotin, Volodkov (RUS)
16 November 2013; 19:30	3× (yellow card) 3× (suspension)	Report	3× (yellow card) 6× (suspension) 1× (red card)	Dragão Caixa, Porto; Attendance: 1,592; Referees: Zotin, Volodkov (RUS)

17 November 2013; 17:00	KIF Kolding (Denmark)	29 – 24	(Poland) Vive Targi Kielce	Brøndby Hall, Brøndby; Attendance: 4,865; Referees: Kékes, Kékes (HUN)
17 November 2013; 17:00	Rocas 8	(17–12)	Čupić 6	Brøndby Hall, Brøndby; Attendance: 4,865; Referees: Kékes, Kékes (HUN)
17 November 2013; 17:00	3× (yellow card) 5× (suspension)	Report	3× (yellow card) 4× (suspension)	Brøndby Hall, Brøndby; Attendance: 4,865; Referees: Kékes, Kékes (HUN)

17 November 2013; 18:45	Dunkerque (France)	21 – 29	(Germany) THW Kiel	Stade des Flandres, Dunkerque; Attendance: 2,481; Referees: San José, Murcia (ESP)
17 November 2013; 18:45	Butto 6	(13–19)	Ekberg 6	Stade des Flandres, Dunkerque; Attendance: 2,481; Referees: San José, Murcia (ESP)
17 November 2013; 18:45	3× (yellow card) 4× (suspension) 1× (red card)	Report	3× (yellow card) 5× (suspension) 1× (red card)	Stade des Flandres, Dunkerque; Attendance: 2,481; Referees: San José, Murcia (ESP)

20 November 2013; 19:00	THW Kiel (Germany)	28 – 25	(France) Dunkerque	Sparkassen-Arena, Kiel; Attendance: 8,500; Referees: Togstad, Kristiansen (NOR)
20 November 2013; 19:00	Klein 5	(15–12)	Causse, Hansen 5	Sparkassen-Arena, Kiel; Attendance: 8,500; Referees: Togstad, Kristiansen (NOR)
20 November 2013; 19:00	3× (yellow card) 1× (suspension)	Report	3× (yellow card) 1× (suspension)	Sparkassen-Arena, Kiel; Attendance: 8,500; Referees: Togstad, Kristiansen (NOR)

21 November 2013; 20:00	Wisła Płock (Poland)	28 – 22	(Portugal) Porto	Orlen Arena, Płock; Attendance: 4,800; Referees: Kurtagic, Wetterwik (SWE)
21 November 2013; 20:00	Nenadić 7	(12–10)	Ferraz 6	Orlen Arena, Płock; Attendance: 4,800; Referees: Kurtagic, Wetterwik (SWE)
21 November 2013; 20:00	3× (yellow card) 4× (suspension)	Report	3× (yellow card) 6× (suspension)	Orlen Arena, Płock; Attendance: 4,800; Referees: Kurtagic, Wetterwik (SWE)

24 November 2013; 17:00	Vive Targi Kielce (Poland)	25 – 26	(Denmark) KIF Kolding	Hala Legionów, Kielce; Attendance: 4,000; Referees: Leandersson, Lindroos (FIN)
24 November 2013; 17:00	Zorman 6	(15–15)	Spellerberg 7	Hala Legionów, Kielce; Attendance: 4,000; Referees: Leandersson, Lindroos (FIN)
24 November 2013; 17:00	3× (yellow card) 4× (suspension)	Report	2× (yellow card) 4× (suspension)	Hala Legionów, Kielce; Attendance: 4,000; Referees: Leandersson, Lindroos (FIN)

30 November 2013; 16:00	Porto (Portugal)	27 – 24	(Denmark) KIF Kolding	Dragão Caixa, Porto; Attendance: 1,363; Referees: Mata, López (ESP)
30 November 2013; 16:00	Spínola 8	(15–11)	Spellerberg 7	Dragão Caixa, Porto; Attendance: 1,363; Referees: Mata, López (ESP)
30 November 2013; 16:00	3× (yellow card) 3× (suspension)	Report	2× (yellow card) 1× (suspension)	Dragão Caixa, Porto; Attendance: 1,363; Referees: Mata, López (ESP)

30 November 2013; 18:00	Dunkerque (France)	30 – 25	(Poland) Vive Targi Kielce	Stade des Flandres, Dunkerque; Attendance: 2,300; Referees: Sigurjónsson, Pétursson (ISL)
30 November 2013; 18:00	Nagy 7	(12–15)	Štrlek 4	Stade des Flandres, Dunkerque; Attendance: 2,300; Referees: Sigurjónsson, Pétursson (ISL)
30 November 2013; 18:00	2× (yellow card) 3× (suspension)	Report	2× (yellow card) 5× (suspension)	Stade des Flandres, Dunkerque; Attendance: 2,300; Referees: Sigurjónsson, Pétursson (ISL)

1 December 2013; 14:30	THW Kiel (Germany)	34 – 25	(Poland) Wisła Płock	Sparkassen-Arena, Kiel; Attendance: 8,600; Referees: Stark, Stefan (ROU)
1 December 2013; 14:30	Pálmarsson 9	(16–11)	Nenadić 9	Sparkassen-Arena, Kiel; Attendance: 8,600; Referees: Stark, Stefan (ROU)
1 December 2013; 14:30	3× (yellow card) 3× (suspension)	Report	3× (yellow card) 4× (suspension)	Sparkassen-Arena, Kiel; Attendance: 8,600; Referees: Stark, Stefan (ROU)

6 February 2014; 20:00	Wisła Płock (Poland)	32 – 25	(France) Dunkerque	Orlen Arena, Płock; Attendance: 4,200; Referees: Nikolov, Nachevski (MKD)
6 February 2014; 20:00	Nenadić 7	(16–13)	Joli 6	Orlen Arena, Płock; Attendance: 4,200; Referees: Nikolov, Nachevski (MKD)
6 February 2014; 20:00	3× (yellow card) 8× (suspension)	Report	3× (yellow card) 4× (suspension)	Orlen Arena, Płock; Attendance: 4,200; Referees: Nikolov, Nachevski (MKD)

7 February 2014; 20:30	Porto (Portugal)	30 – 35	(Poland) Vive Targi Kielce	Dragão Caixa, Porto; Attendance: 1,272; Referees: Krstić, Ljubić (SLO)
7 February 2014; 20:30	Duarte 9	(14–16)	Bielecki 8	Dragão Caixa, Porto; Attendance: 1,272; Referees: Krstić, Ljubić (SLO)
7 February 2014; 20:30	2× (yellow card) 5× (suspension)	Report	2× (yellow card) 3× (suspension)	Dragão Caixa, Porto; Attendance: 1,272; Referees: Krstić, Ljubić (SLO)

9 February 2014; 16:55	KIF Kolding (Denmark)	24 – 26	(Germany) THW Kiel	Brøndby Hall, Brøndby; Attendance: 5,000; Referees: Zotin, Volodkov (RUS)
9 February 2014; 16:55	Andersson 7	(13–13)	Ekberg 8	Brøndby Hall, Brøndby; Attendance: 5,000; Referees: Zotin, Volodkov (RUS)
9 February 2014; 16:55	3× (yellow card) 2× (suspension)	Report	3× (yellow card) 4× (suspension)	Brøndby Hall, Brøndby; Attendance: 5,000; Referees: Zotin, Volodkov (RUS)

13 February 2014; 20:30	Wisła Płock (Poland)	25 – 26	(Denmark) KIF Kolding	Orlen Arena, Płock; Attendance: 5,400; Referees: Horváth, Márton (HUN)
13 February 2014; 20:30	Lijewski, Zrnić 5	(8–10)	Rocas 6	Orlen Arena, Płock; Attendance: 5,400; Referees: Horváth, Márton (HUN)
13 February 2014; 20:30	3× (yellow card) 4× (suspension)	Report	3× (yellow card) 5× (suspension)	Orlen Arena, Płock; Attendance: 5,400; Referees: Horváth, Márton (HUN)

15 February 2014; 18:00	Dunkerque (France)	25 – 25	(Portugal) Porto	Stade des Flandres, Dunkerque; Attendance: 2,200; Referees: Konjičanin, Konjičanin (BIH)
15 February 2014; 18:00	three players 4	(13–14)	Duarte 8	Stade des Flandres, Dunkerque; Attendance: 2,200; Referees: Konjičanin, Konjičanin (BIH)
15 February 2014; 18:00	3× (yellow card) 1× (suspension)	Report	3× (yellow card) 5× (suspension) 1× (red card)	Stade des Flandres, Dunkerque; Attendance: 2,200; Referees: Konjičanin, Konjičanin (BIH)

16 February 2014; 17:45	THW Kiel (Germany)	28 – 28	(Poland) Vive Targi Kielce	Sparkassen-Arena, Kiel; Attendance: 10,200; Referees: López, Ramírez (ESP)
16 February 2014; 17:45	Vujin 10	(13–16)	Jurecki 7	Sparkassen-Arena, Kiel; Attendance: 10,200; Referees: López, Ramírez (ESP)
16 February 2014; 17:45	3× (yellow card) 3× (suspension)	Report	2× (yellow card) 3× (suspension)	Sparkassen-Arena, Kiel; Attendance: 10,200; Referees: López, Ramírez (ESP)

19 February 2014; 19:30	THW Kiel (Germany)	30 – 25	(Portugal) Porto	Sparkassen-Arena, Kiel; Attendance: 7,800; Referees: Gubica, Milošević (CRO)
19 February 2014; 19:30	Zeitz 6	(17–11)	three players 5	Sparkassen-Arena, Kiel; Attendance: 7,800; Referees: Gubica, Milošević (CRO)
19 February 2014; 19:30	2× (yellow card) 1× (suspension)	Report	3× (yellow card) 2× (suspension)	Sparkassen-Arena, Kiel; Attendance: 7,800; Referees: Gubica, Milošević (CRO)

23 February 2014; 16:55	KIF Kolding (Denmark)	26 – 24	(France) Dunkerque	Kolding Hallen, Kolding; Attendance: 2,507; Referees: Erdoğan, Özdeniz (TUR)
23 February 2014; 16:55	Rocas 8	(15–15)	Hansen 6	Kolding Hallen, Kolding; Attendance: 2,507; Referees: Erdoğan, Özdeniz (TUR)
23 February 2014; 16:55	3× (yellow card) 2× (suspension)	Report	1× (yellow card) 3× (suspension)	Kolding Hallen, Kolding; Attendance: 2,507; Referees: Erdoğan, Özdeniz (TUR)

23 February 2014; 19:00	Vive Targi Kielce (Poland)	38 – 30	(Poland) Wisła Płock	Hala Legionów, Kielce; Attendance: 4,200; Referees: Baďura, Ondogrecula (SVK)
23 February 2014; 19:00	Buntić 7	(20–12)	Nenadić 9	Hala Legionów, Kielce; Attendance: 4,200; Referees: Baďura, Ondogrecula (SVK)
23 February 2014; 19:00	3× (yellow card) 7× (suspension)	Report	2× (yellow card) 4× (suspension)	Hala Legionów, Kielce; Attendance: 4,200; Referees: Baďura, Ondogrecula (SVK)

== Group C ==
Team	Pld	W	D	L	GF	GA	GD	Pts
(Spain) Barcelona	10	8	1	1	348	256	+92	17
(France) Paris Saint-Germain	10	6	1	3	315	288	+27	13
(North Macedonia) Metalurg	10	5	2	3	256	265	−9	12
(North Macedonia) Vardar	10	4	2	4	269	263	+6	10
(Belarus) Dinamo-Minsk	10	3	1	6	266	295	−29	7
(Switzerland) Wacker Thun	10	0	1	9	242	329	−87	1

21 September 2013; 16:00	Paris Saint-Germain (France)	34 – 30	(Belarus) Dinamo-Minsk	Stade Pierre de Coubertin, Paris; Attendance: 2,700; Referees: Leandersson, Lindroos (FIN)
21 September 2013; 16:00	Abalo 8	(12–11)	Shelmenko 7	Stade Pierre de Coubertin, Paris; Attendance: 2,700; Referees: Leandersson, Lindroos (FIN)
21 September 2013; 16:00	3× (yellow card) 4× (suspension)	Report	3× (yellow card) 5× (suspension)	Stade Pierre de Coubertin, Paris; Attendance: 2,700; Referees: Leandersson, Lindroos (FIN)

21 September 2013; 16:30	Wacker Thun (Switzerland)	22 – 23	(North Macedonia) Metalurg	Sporthalle Lachen, Thun; Attendance: 1,454; Referees: Stenrand, Birch (DEN)
21 September 2013; 16:30	Dähler 5	(9–13)	Mojsovski 7	Sporthalle Lachen, Thun; Attendance: 1,454; Referees: Stenrand, Birch (DEN)
21 September 2013; 16:30	3× (yellow card) 6× (suspension)	Report	3× (yellow card) 4× (suspension) 1× (red card)	Sporthalle Lachen, Thun; Attendance: 1,454; Referees: Stenrand, Birch (DEN)

21 September 2013; 18:15	Vardar (North Macedonia)	29 – 29	(Spain) Barcelona	Boris Trajkovski Sports Center, Skopje; Attendance: 6,963; Referees: Horáček, Novotný (CZE)
21 September 2013; 18:15	Dibirov 8	(15–19)	Rutenka 8	Boris Trajkovski Sports Center, Skopje; Attendance: 6,963; Referees: Horáček, Novotný (CZE)
21 September 2013; 18:15	3× (yellow card) 5× (suspension)	Report	3× (yellow card) 1× (suspension)	Boris Trajkovski Sports Center, Skopje; Attendance: 6,963; Referees: Horáček, Novotný (CZE)

25 September 2013; 19:00	Dinamo-Minsk (Belarus)	26 – 24	(North Macedonia) Vardar	Minsk Sports Palace, Minsk; Attendance: 3,360; Referees: Fleisch, Rieber (GER)
25 September 2013; 19:00	Shelmenko 6	(11–11)	Dibirov 6	Minsk Sports Palace, Minsk; Attendance: 3,360; Referees: Fleisch, Rieber (GER)
25 September 2013; 19:00	3× (yellow card) 4× (suspension)	Report	3× (yellow card) 6× (suspension)	Minsk Sports Palace, Minsk; Attendance: 3,360; Referees: Fleisch, Rieber (GER)

28 September 2013; 16:15	Barcelona (Spain)	45 – 26	(Switzerland) Wacker Thun	Palau Blaugrana, Barcelona; Attendance: 1,589; Referees: Poulsen, Mortensen (DEN)
28 September 2013; 16:15	Karabatić, Lazarov 6	(21–14)	Linder 7	Palau Blaugrana, Barcelona; Attendance: 1,589; Referees: Poulsen, Mortensen (DEN)
28 September 2013; 16:15	3× (yellow card) 4× (suspension)	Report	3× (yellow card) 7× (suspension)	Palau Blaugrana, Barcelona; Attendance: 1,589; Referees: Poulsen, Mortensen (DEN)

28 September 2013; 18:00	Metalurg (North Macedonia)	28 – 26	(France) Paris Saint-Germain	Boris Trajkovski Sports Center, Skopje; Attendance: 6,963; Referees: Togstad, Kristiansen (NOR)
28 September 2013; 18:00	Vugrinec 9	(12–12)	Melić 5	Boris Trajkovski Sports Center, Skopje; Attendance: 6,963; Referees: Togstad, Kristiansen (NOR)
28 September 2013; 18:00	2× (yellow card) 3× (suspension)	Report	3× (yellow card) 3× (suspension)	Boris Trajkovski Sports Center, Skopje; Attendance: 6,963; Referees: Togstad, Kristiansen (NOR)

10 October 2013; 19:00	Dinamo-Minsk (Belarus)	27 – 20	(Switzerland) Wacker Thun	Minsk Sports Palace, Minsk; Attendance: 3,360; Referees: Schulze, Tönnies (GER)
10 October 2013; 19:00	Doborac 7	(14–8)	Studer 5	Minsk Sports Palace, Minsk; Attendance: 3,360; Referees: Schulze, Tönnies (GER)
10 October 2013; 19:00	3× (yellow card) 3× (suspension)	Report	3× (yellow card) 3× (suspension)	Minsk Sports Palace, Minsk; Attendance: 3,360; Referees: Schulze, Tönnies (GER)

12 October 2013; 16:15	Barcelona (Spain)	35 – 17	(North Macedonia) Metalurg	Palau Blaugrana, Barcelona; Attendance: 1,869; Referees: Leszczynski, Piechota (POL)
12 October 2013; 16:15	Lazarov 9	(17–5)	Vugrinec 6	Palau Blaugrana, Barcelona; Attendance: 1,869; Referees: Leszczynski, Piechota (POL)
12 October 2013; 16:15	3× (yellow card) 2× (suspension)	Report	3× (yellow card) 6× (suspension)	Palau Blaugrana, Barcelona; Attendance: 1,869; Referees: Leszczynski, Piechota (POL)

13 October 2013; 19:00	Vardar (North Macedonia)	24 – 24	(France) Paris Saint-Germain	Boris Trajkovski Sports Center, Skopje; Attendance: 6,900; Referees: Dinu, Din (ROU)
13 October 2013; 19:00	Chipurin 6	(9–12)	Hansen 7	Boris Trajkovski Sports Center, Skopje; Attendance: 6,900; Referees: Dinu, Din (ROU)
13 October 2013; 19:00	3× (yellow card) 3× (suspension)	Report	3× (yellow card) 7× (suspension) 1× (red card)	Boris Trajkovski Sports Center, Skopje; Attendance: 6,900; Referees: Dinu, Din (ROU)

19 October 2013; 17:30	Wacker Thun (Switzerland)	24 – 37	(North Macedonia) Vardar	Sporthalle Lachen, Thun; Attendance: 1,625; Referees: Santos, Fonseca (POR)
19 October 2013; 17:30	Franić 6	(11–19)	Dujshebaev 7	Sporthalle Lachen, Thun; Attendance: 1,625; Referees: Santos, Fonseca (POR)
19 October 2013; 17:30	3× (yellow card) 5× (suspension)	Report	3× (yellow card) 6× (suspension)	Sporthalle Lachen, Thun; Attendance: 1,625; Referees: Santos, Fonseca (POR)

20 October 2013; 17:00	Paris Saint-Germain (France)	29 – 33	(Spain) Barcelona	Stade Pierre de Coubertin, Paris; Attendance: 4,000; Referees: Geipel, Helbig (GER)
20 October 2013; 17:00	Abalo, Melić 6	(17–17)	Rutenka 8	Stade Pierre de Coubertin, Paris; Attendance: 4,000; Referees: Geipel, Helbig (GER)
20 October 2013; 17:00	3× (yellow card) 4× (suspension) 1× (red card)	Report	3× (yellow card) 5× (suspension)	Stade Pierre de Coubertin, Paris; Attendance: 4,000; Referees: Geipel, Helbig (GER)

20 October 2013; 18:00	Metalurg (North Macedonia)	33 – 29	(Belarus) Dinamo-Minsk	Boris Trajkovski Sports Center, Skopje; Attendance: 6,963; Referees: Dobrovits, Tájok (HUN)
20 October 2013; 18:00	Mojsovski 7	(20–18)	Rutenka 7	Boris Trajkovski Sports Center, Skopje; Attendance: 6,963; Referees: Dobrovits, Tájok (HUN)
20 October 2013; 18:00	1× (yellow card) 2× (suspension)	Report	3× (yellow card) 3× (suspension)	Boris Trajkovski Sports Center, Skopje; Attendance: 6,963; Referees: Dobrovits, Tájok (HUN)

14 November 2013; 19:00	Dinamo-Minsk (Belarus)	25 – 35	(Spain) Barcelona	Minsk-Arena, Minsk; Attendance: 15,320; Referees: Gubica, Milošević (CRO)
14 November 2013; 19:00	Babichev 6	(15–16)	Rutenka 8	Minsk-Arena, Minsk; Attendance: 15,320; Referees: Gubica, Milošević (CRO)
14 November 2013; 19:00	3× (yellow card) 3× (suspension)	Report	3× (yellow card) 2× (suspension)	Minsk-Arena, Minsk; Attendance: 15,320; Referees: Gubica, Milošević (CRO)

14 November 2013; 20:00	Metalurg (North Macedonia)	22 – 27	(North Macedonia) Vardar	Boris Trajkovski Sports Center, Skopje; Attendance: 6,963; Referees: Gjeding, Hansen (DEN)
14 November 2013; 20:00	Atman 7	(9–14)	Dibirov 8	Boris Trajkovski Sports Center, Skopje; Attendance: 6,963; Referees: Gjeding, Hansen (DEN)
14 November 2013; 20:00	3× (yellow card) 5× (suspension)	Report	3× (yellow card) 7× (suspension)	Boris Trajkovski Sports Center, Skopje; Attendance: 6,963; Referees: Gjeding, Hansen (DEN)

17 November 2013; 17:00	Wacker Thun (Switzerland)	28 – 34	(France) Paris Saint-Germain	Sporthalle Lachen, Thun; Attendance: 2,100; Referees: Erdoğan, Özdeniz (TUR)
17 November 2013; 17:00	Friedli 6	(10–15)	Melić 7	Sporthalle Lachen, Thun; Attendance: 2,100; Referees: Erdoğan, Özdeniz (TUR)
17 November 2013; 17:00	3× (yellow card) 2× (suspension)	Report	2× (yellow card) 3× (suspension)	Sporthalle Lachen, Thun; Attendance: 2,100; Referees: Erdoğan, Özdeniz (TUR)

23 November 2013; 12:15	Barcelona (Spain)	35 – 25	(Belarus) Dinamo-Minsk	Palau Blaugrana, Barcelona; Attendance: 2,342; Referees: Stoļarovs, Līcis (LAT)
23 November 2013; 12:15	Rutenka 7	(13–9)	Babichev 5	Palau Blaugrana, Barcelona; Attendance: 2,342; Referees: Stoļarovs, Līcis (LAT)
23 November 2013; 12:15	2× (yellow card) 1× (suspension)	Report	2× (yellow card) 3× (suspension)	Palau Blaugrana, Barcelona; Attendance: 2,342; Referees: Stoļarovs, Līcis (LAT)

23 November 2013; 18:00	Paris Saint-Germain (France)	38 – 24	(Switzerland) Wacker Thun	Stade Pierre de Coubertin, Paris; Attendance: 3,000; Referees: Brkic, Jusufhodzic (AUT)
23 November 2013; 18:00	three players 6	(22–11)	Hüsser, Studer 5	Stade Pierre de Coubertin, Paris; Attendance: 3,000; Referees: Brkic, Jusufhodzic (AUT)
23 November 2013; 18:00	3× (yellow card) 2× (suspension)	Report	3× (yellow card) 3× (suspension)	Stade Pierre de Coubertin, Paris; Attendance: 3,000; Referees: Brkic, Jusufhodzic (AUT)

24 November 2013; 18:00	Vardar (North Macedonia)	18 – 26	(North Macedonia) Metalurg	Boris Trajkovski Sports Center, Skopje; Attendance: 6,963; Referees: Geipel, Helbig (GER)
24 November 2013; 18:00	Dibirov 5	(12–10)	Mojsovski, Vugrinec 8	Boris Trajkovski Sports Center, Skopje; Attendance: 6,963; Referees: Geipel, Helbig (GER)
24 November 2013; 18:00	3× (yellow card) 4× (suspension)	Report	3× (yellow card) 3× (suspension)	Boris Trajkovski Sports Center, Skopje; Attendance: 6,963; Referees: Geipel, Helbig (GER)

30 November 2013; 16:15	Barcelona (Spain)	30 – 23	(North Macedonia) Vardar	Palau Blaugrana, Barcelona; Attendance: 1,929; Referees: Elíasson, Pálsson (ISL)
30 November 2013; 16:15	Lazarov 7	(14–11)	Brumen 6	Palau Blaugrana, Barcelona; Attendance: 1,929; Referees: Elíasson, Pálsson (ISL)
30 November 2013; 16:15	3× (yellow card) 3× (suspension)	Report	3× (yellow card) 6× (suspension)	Palau Blaugrana, Barcelona; Attendance: 1,929; Referees: Elíasson, Pálsson (ISL)

1 December 2013; 17:00	Dinamo-Minsk (Belarus)	29 – 35	(France) Paris Saint-Germain	Minsk Sports Palace, Minsk; Attendance: 3,490; Referees: Nikolić, Stojković (SRB)
1 December 2013; 17:00	Bundalo 7	(14–19)	Bojinović 8	Minsk Sports Palace, Minsk; Attendance: 3,490; Referees: Nikolić, Stojković (SRB)
1 December 2013; 17:00	3× (yellow card) 3× (suspension)	Report	3× (yellow card) 5× (suspension)	Minsk Sports Palace, Minsk; Attendance: 3,490; Referees: Nikolić, Stojković (SRB)

1 December 2013; 18:00	Metalurg (North Macedonia)	24 – 24	(Switzerland) Wacker Thun	Boris Trajkovski Sports Center, Skopje; Attendance: 5,500; Referees: Kaveshnikov, Plotnikov (RUS)
1 December 2013; 18:00	Vugrinec 7	(11–14)	Von Deschwanden 8	Boris Trajkovski Sports Center, Skopje; Attendance: 5,500; Referees: Kaveshnikov, Plotnikov (RUS)
1 December 2013; 18:00	3× (yellow card) 3× (suspension)	Report	2× (yellow card) 5× (suspension)	Boris Trajkovski Sports Center, Skopje; Attendance: 5,500; Referees: Kaveshnikov, Plotnikov (RUS)

8 February 2014; 16:30	Wacker Thun (Switzerland)	23 – 39	(Spain) Barcelona	Sporthalle Lachen, Thun; Attendance: 2,400; Referees: Baďura, Ondogrecula (SVK)
8 February 2014; 16:30	Von Deschwanden 5	(13–17)	Lazarov 7	Sporthalle Lachen, Thun; Attendance: 2,400; Referees: Baďura, Ondogrecula (SVK)
8 February 2014; 16:30	3× (yellow card) 5× (suspension)	Report	2× (yellow card) 2× (suspension)	Sporthalle Lachen, Thun; Attendance: 2,400; Referees: Baďura, Ondogrecula (SVK)

8 February 2014; 18:00	Paris Saint-Germain (France)	32 – 29	(North Macedonia) Metalurg	Stade Pierre de Coubertin, Paris; Attendance: 2,100; Referees: Stenrand, Birch (DEN)
8 February 2014; 18:00	Hansen 8	(16–12)	Georgievski, Vugrinec 6	Stade Pierre de Coubertin, Paris; Attendance: 2,100; Referees: Stenrand, Birch (DEN)
8 February 2014; 18:00	2× (yellow card) 6× (suspension) 1× (red card)	Report	3× (yellow card) 3× (suspension)	Stade Pierre de Coubertin, Paris; Attendance: 2,100; Referees: Stenrand, Birch (DEN)

9 February 2014; 18:00	Vardar (North Macedonia)	30 – 22	(Belarus) Dinamo-Minsk	Boris Trajkovski Sports Center, Skopje; Attendance: 6,963; Referees: Cohen, Peretz (ISR)
9 February 2014; 18:00	Dibirov 8	(14–11)	Ninčević 7	Boris Trajkovski Sports Center, Skopje; Attendance: 6,963; Referees: Cohen, Peretz (ISR)
9 February 2014; 18:00	3× (yellow card) 1× (suspension) 1× (red card)	Report	3× (yellow card) 4× (suspension)	Boris Trajkovski Sports Center, Skopje; Attendance: 6,963; Referees: Cohen, Peretz (ISR)

15 February 2014; 16:15	Barcelona (Spain)	38 – 28	(France) Paris Saint-Germain	Palau Blaugrana, Barcelona; Attendance: 6,702; Referees: Gjeding, Hansen (DEN)
15 February 2014; 16:15	Tomás 10	(19–9)	Garcia, M'Tima 5	Palau Blaugrana, Barcelona; Attendance: 6,702; Referees: Gjeding, Hansen (DEN)
15 February 2014; 16:15	3× (yellow card) 4× (suspension)	Report	3× (yellow card) 2× (suspension)	Palau Blaugrana, Barcelona; Attendance: 6,702; Referees: Gjeding, Hansen (DEN)

16 February 2014; 16:00	Dinamo-Minsk (Belarus)	23 – 23	(North Macedonia) Metalurg	Minsk Sports Palace, Minsk; Attendance: 3,140; Referees: Brunovský, Čanda (SVK)
16 February 2014; 16:00	Bombač, Rutenka 4	(13–11)	Ojleski, Vugrinec 5	Minsk Sports Palace, Minsk; Attendance: 3,140; Referees: Brunovský, Čanda (SVK)
16 February 2014; 16:00	3× (yellow card) 4× (suspension)	Report	3× (yellow card) 4× (suspension)	Minsk Sports Palace, Minsk; Attendance: 3,140; Referees: Brunovský, Čanda (SVK)

16 February 2014; 18:00	Vardar (North Macedonia)	32 – 25	(Switzerland) Wacker Thun	Boris Trajkovski Sports Center, Skopje; Attendance: 5,000; Referees: Opava, Válek (CZE)
16 February 2014; 18:00	Karačić 6	(17–11)	Von Deschwanden 8	Boris Trajkovski Sports Center, Skopje; Attendance: 5,000; Referees: Opava, Válek (CZE)
16 February 2014; 18:00	3× (yellow card) 2× (suspension)	Report	3× (yellow card) 4× (suspension)	Boris Trajkovski Sports Center, Skopje; Attendance: 5,000; Referees: Opava, Válek (CZE)

22 February 2014; 18:00	Paris Saint-Germain (France)	35 – 25	(North Macedonia) Vardar	Stade Pierre de Coubertin, Paris; Attendance: 2,300; Referees: Geipel, Helbig (GER)
22 February 2014; 18:00	Abalo, García Robledo 5	(15–12)	Karačić 7	Stade Pierre de Coubertin, Paris; Attendance: 2,300; Referees: Geipel, Helbig (GER)
22 February 2014; 18:00	3× (yellow card) 2× (suspension)	Report	3× (yellow card) 4× (suspension)	Stade Pierre de Coubertin, Paris; Attendance: 2,300; Referees: Geipel, Helbig (GER)

23 February 2014; 17:30	Wacker Thun (Switzerland)	26 – 30	(Belarus) Dinamo-Minsk	Sporthalle Lachen, Thun; Attendance: 1,800; Referees: Togstad, Kristiansen (NOR)
23 February 2014; 17:30	Von Deschwanden 7	(11–13)	Ninčević 10	Sporthalle Lachen, Thun; Attendance: 1,800; Referees: Togstad, Kristiansen (NOR)
23 February 2014; 17:30	3× (yellow card) 4× (suspension)	Report	3× (yellow card) 3× (suspension)	Sporthalle Lachen, Thun; Attendance: 1,800; Referees: Togstad, Kristiansen (NOR)

23 February 2014; 18:00	Metalurg (North Macedonia)	31 – 29	(Spain) Barcelona	Boris Trajkovski Sports Center, Skopje; Attendance: 6,963; Referees: Zotin, Volodkov (RUS)
23 February 2014; 18:00	Markoski 7	(15–11)	Karabatić 7	Boris Trajkovski Sports Center, Skopje; Attendance: 6,963; Referees: Zotin, Volodkov (RUS)
23 February 2014; 18:00	3× (yellow card) 6× (suspension)	Report	2× (yellow card) 3× (suspension)	Boris Trajkovski Sports Center, Skopje; Attendance: 6,963; Referees: Zotin, Volodkov (RUS)

== Group D ==
Team	Pld	W	D	L	GF	GA	GD	Pts
(Germany) HSV Hamburg	10	9	0	1	330	266	+64	18
(Germany) Flensburg	10	8	1	1	314	272	+42	17
(Slovenia) Gorenje	10	4	0	6	307	320	−13	8
(Denmark) Aalborg	10	4	0	6	275	265	+10	8
(Spain) La Rioja	10	3	2	5	292	320	−28	8
(Sweden) HK Drott	10	0	1	9	289	364	−75	1

21 September 2013; 19:30	La Rioja (Spain)	24 – 33	(Germany) HSV Hamburg	Palacio de los Deportes de La Rioja, Logroño; Attendance: 2,500; Referees: Nikolić, Stojković (SRB)
21 September 2013; 19:30	three players 4	(8–14)	Schröder 9	Palacio de los Deportes de La Rioja, Logroño; Attendance: 2,500; Referees: Nikolić, Stojković (SRB)
21 September 2013; 19:30	3× (yellow card) 2× (suspension)	Report	3× (yellow card) 5× (suspension)	Palacio de los Deportes de La Rioja, Logroño; Attendance: 2,500; Referees: Nikolić, Stojković (SRB)

21 September 2013; 20:30	Gorenje (Slovenia)	35 – 33	(Sweden) HK Drott	Red Hall, Velenje; Attendance: 1,000; Referees: Bonifert, Oláh (HUN)
21 September 2013; 20:30	Cehte 12	(19–16)	Halen 7	Red Hall, Velenje; Attendance: 1,000; Referees: Bonifert, Oláh (HUN)
21 September 2013; 20:30	2× (yellow card) 5× (suspension)	Report	3× (yellow card) 3× (suspension)	Red Hall, Velenje; Attendance: 1,000; Referees: Bonifert, Oláh (HUN)

22 September 2013; 15:00	Flensburg (Germany)	31 – 27	(Denmark) Aalborg	Campushalle, Flensburg; Attendance: 2,691; Referees: Baranowski, Lemanowicz (POL)
22 September 2013; 15:00	Glandorf 8	(15–12)	Larsen, Slundt 7	Campushalle, Flensburg; Attendance: 2,691; Referees: Baranowski, Lemanowicz (POL)
22 September 2013; 15:00	3× (yellow card) 5× (suspension)	Report	2× (yellow card) 4× (suspension)	Campushalle, Flensburg; Attendance: 2,691; Referees: Baranowski, Lemanowicz (POL)

25 September 2013; 19:00	HK Drott (Sweden)	27 – 37	(Germany) Flensburg	Halmstad Arena, Halmstad; Attendance: 1,709; Referees: Hansen, Pettersen (NOR)
25 September 2013; 19:00	Persson, Stenmalm 5	(13–19)	three players 6	Halmstad Arena, Halmstad; Attendance: 1,709; Referees: Hansen, Pettersen (NOR)
25 September 2013; 19:00	3× (yellow card) 3× (suspension)	Report	3× (yellow card) 2× (suspension)	Halmstad Arena, Halmstad; Attendance: 1,709; Referees: Hansen, Pettersen (NOR)

26 September 2013; 20:00	HSV Hamburg (Germany)	41 – 32	(Slovenia) Gorenje	Alsterdorfer Sporthalle, Hamburg; Attendance: 2,040; Referees: Pichon, Reveret (FRA)
26 September 2013; 20:00	Marković 7	(21–13)	Medved 6	Alsterdorfer Sporthalle, Hamburg; Attendance: 2,040; Referees: Pichon, Reveret (FRA)
26 September 2013; 20:00	3× (yellow card)	Report	3× (yellow card) 4× (suspension)	Alsterdorfer Sporthalle, Hamburg; Attendance: 2,040; Referees: Pichon, Reveret (FRA)

29 September 2013; 17:00	Aalborg (Denmark)	28 – 24	(Spain) La Rioja	Gigantium, Aalborg; Attendance: 3,117; Referees: Gubica, Milošević (CRO)
29 September 2013; 17:00	Larsen 8	(16–10)	Malašinskas 7	Gigantium, Aalborg; Attendance: 3,117; Referees: Gubica, Milošević (CRO)
29 September 2013; 17:00	3× (yellow card)	Report	3× (yellow card) 2× (suspension)	Gigantium, Aalborg; Attendance: 3,117; Referees: Gubica, Milošević (CRO)

13 October 2013; 13:30	Aalborg (Denmark)	26 – 28	(Germany) HSV Hamburg	Gigantium, Aalborg; Attendance: 4,237; Referees: Mažeika, Gatelis (LTU)
13 October 2013; 13:30	three players 5	(14–14)	Hens 5	Gigantium, Aalborg; Attendance: 4,237; Referees: Mažeika, Gatelis (LTU)
13 October 2013; 13:30	2× (yellow card) 4× (suspension)	Report	3× (yellow card) 3× (suspension)	Gigantium, Aalborg; Attendance: 4,237; Referees: Mažeika, Gatelis (LTU)

13 October 2013; 16:00	HK Drott (Sweden)	35 – 35	(Spain) La Rioja	Halmstad Arena, Halmstad; Attendance: 850; Referees: Horváth, Márton (HUN)
13 October 2013; 16:00	Stenmalm 10	(15–19)	Fernández Pérez 6	Halmstad Arena, Halmstad; Attendance: 850; Referees: Horváth, Márton (HUN)
13 October 2013; 16:00	3× (yellow card) 2× (suspension)	Report	3× (yellow card) 5× (suspension)	Halmstad Arena, Halmstad; Attendance: 850; Referees: Horváth, Márton (HUN)

13 October 2013; 17:30	Flensburg (Germany)	35 – 31	(Slovenia) Gorenje	Campushalle, Flensburg; Attendance: 3,207; Referees: Opava, Válek (CZE)
13 October 2013; 17:30	Eggert 7	(16–13)	Šoštarič 9	Campushalle, Flensburg; Attendance: 3,207; Referees: Opava, Válek (CZE)
13 October 2013; 17:30	3× (yellow card) 3× (suspension)	Report	3× (yellow card) 4× (suspension) 1× (red card)	Campushalle, Flensburg; Attendance: 3,207; Referees: Opava, Válek (CZE)

16 October 2013; 19:15	Gorenje (Slovenia)	25 – 30	(Denmark) Aalborg	Red Hall, Velenje; Attendance: 1,230; Referees: Zotin, Volodkov (RUS)
16 October 2013; 19:15	Skube 8	(11–15)	Slundt 8	Red Hall, Velenje; Attendance: 1,230; Referees: Zotin, Volodkov (RUS)
16 October 2013; 19:15	3× (yellow card) 2× (suspension)	Report	3× (yellow card) 2× (suspension)	Red Hall, Velenje; Attendance: 1,230; Referees: Zotin, Volodkov (RUS)

17 October 2013; 19:00	HSV Hamburg (Germany)	39 – 30	(Sweden) HK Drott	Alsterdorfer Sporthalle, Hamburg; Attendance: 2,350; Referees: Baďura, Ondogrecula (SVK)
17 October 2013; 19:00	Mahe, Schröder 8	(18–14)	Persson 6	Alsterdorfer Sporthalle, Hamburg; Attendance: 2,350; Referees: Baďura, Ondogrecula (SVK)
17 October 2013; 19:00	2× (yellow card) 2× (suspension)	Report	2× (yellow card) 5× (suspension)	Alsterdorfer Sporthalle, Hamburg; Attendance: 2,350; Referees: Baďura, Ondogrecula (SVK)

19 October 2013; 20:00	La Rioja (Spain)	32 – 32	(Germany) Flensburg	Palacio de los Deportes de La Rioja, Logroño; Attendance: 2,500; Referees: Elíasson, Pálsson (ISL)
19 October 2013; 20:00	da Costa Capote 10	(13–19)	Weinhold 8	Palacio de los Deportes de La Rioja, Logroño; Attendance: 2,500; Referees: Elíasson, Pálsson (ISL)
19 October 2013; 20:00	3× (yellow card) 3× (suspension)	Report	3× (yellow card) 5× (suspension)	Palacio de los Deportes de La Rioja, Logroño; Attendance: 2,500; Referees: Elíasson, Pálsson (ISL)

16 November 2013; 14:45	HSV Hamburg (Germany)	32 – 27	(Germany) Flensburg	O² World, Hamburg; Attendance: 6,844; Referees: Nikolov, Nachevski (MKD)
16 November 2013; 14:45	Lindberg 7	(15–14)	Weinhold 8	O² World, Hamburg; Attendance: 6,844; Referees: Nikolov, Nachevski (MKD)
16 November 2013; 14:45	3× (yellow card) 3× (suspension)	Report	3× (yellow card) 2× (suspension)	O² World, Hamburg; Attendance: 6,844; Referees: Nikolov, Nachevski (MKD)

16 November 2013; 19:00	La Rioja (Spain)	34 – 31	(Slovenia) Gorenje	Palacio de los Deportes de La Rioja, Logroño; Attendance: 2,600; Referees: Baďura, Ondogrecula (SVK)
16 November 2013; 19:00	Fernández 10	(15–13)	Skube 7	Palacio de los Deportes de La Rioja, Logroño; Attendance: 2,600; Referees: Baďura, Ondogrecula (SVK)
16 November 2013; 19:00	3× (yellow card) 1× (suspension)	Report	3× (yellow card) 4× (suspension)	Palacio de los Deportes de La Rioja, Logroño; Attendance: 2,600; Referees: Baďura, Ondogrecula (SVK)

17 November 2013; 15:00	HK Drott (Sweden)	26 – 35	(Denmark) Aalborg	Halmstad Arena, Halmstad; Attendance: 1,045; Referees: Horáček, Novotný (CZE)
17 November 2013; 15:00	Persson 11	(8–15)	Tvedten 11	Halmstad Arena, Halmstad; Attendance: 1,045; Referees: Horáček, Novotný (CZE)
17 November 2013; 15:00	3× (yellow card) 4× (suspension)	Report	3× (yellow card) 2× (suspension)	Halmstad Arena, Halmstad; Attendance: 1,045; Referees: Horáček, Novotný (CZE)

21 November 2013; 19:00	Flensburg (Germany)	27 – 24	(Germany) HSV Hamburg	Campushalle, Flensburg; Attendance: 4,057; Referees: Dentz, Reibel (FRA)
21 November 2013; 19:00	Eggert 9	(11–13)	Đorđić 8	Campushalle, Flensburg; Attendance: 4,057; Referees: Dentz, Reibel (FRA)
21 November 2013; 19:00	3× (yellow card) 3× (suspension)	Report	3× (yellow card) 2× (suspension) 1× (red card)	Campushalle, Flensburg; Attendance: 4,057; Referees: Dentz, Reibel (FRA)

23 November 2013; 20:30	Gorenje (Slovenia)	33 – 28	(Spain) La Rioja	Red Hall, Velenje; Attendance: 1,000; Referees: Caçador, Nicolau (POR)
23 November 2013; 20:30	S. Burić 6	(15–14)	Jiménez 12	Red Hall, Velenje; Attendance: 1,000; Referees: Caçador, Nicolau (POR)
23 November 2013; 20:30	3× (yellow card) 6× (suspension) 1× (red card)	Report	3× (yellow card) 1× (suspension)	Red Hall, Velenje; Attendance: 1,000; Referees: Caçador, Nicolau (POR)

24 November 2013; 15:00	Aalborg (Denmark)	37 – 24	(Sweden) HK Drott	Gigantium, Aalborg; Attendance: 3,721; Referees: Tzaferopoulos, Bethmann (GRE)
24 November 2013; 15:00	Tvedten 7	(17–7)	Löfgren, Persson 5	Gigantium, Aalborg; Attendance: 3,721; Referees: Tzaferopoulos, Bethmann (GRE)
24 November 2013; 15:00	2× (yellow card) 1× (suspension)	Report	3× (yellow card) 2× (suspension)	Gigantium, Aalborg; Attendance: 3,721; Referees: Tzaferopoulos, Bethmann (GRE)

27 November 2013; 18:00	HK Drott (Sweden)	32 – 40	(Slovenia) Gorenje	Halmstad Arena, Halmstad; Attendance: 809; Referees: Buache, Meyer (SUI)
27 November 2013; 18:00	Persson, Stenberg 7	(14–20)	Šoštarič 10	Halmstad Arena, Halmstad; Attendance: 809; Referees: Buache, Meyer (SUI)
27 November 2013; 18:00	3× (yellow card) 2× (suspension)	Report	3× (yellow card) 4× (suspension)	Halmstad Arena, Halmstad; Attendance: 809; Referees: Buache, Meyer (SUI)

27 November 2013; 19:15	HSV Hamburg (Germany)	34 – 27	(Spain) La Rioja	Alsterdorfer Sporthalle, Hamburg; Attendance: 2,297; Referees: Jurinović, Mrvica (CRO)
27 November 2013; 19:15	Nilsson 6	(17–12)	Petrus, Jiménez 6	Alsterdorfer Sporthalle, Hamburg; Attendance: 2,297; Referees: Jurinović, Mrvica (CRO)
27 November 2013; 19:15	3× (yellow card) 1× (suspension)	Report	3× (suspension)	Alsterdorfer Sporthalle, Hamburg; Attendance: 2,297; Referees: Jurinović, Mrvica (CRO)

1 December 2013; 16:00	Aalborg (Denmark)	26 – 27	(Germany) Flensburg	Gigantium, Aalborg; Attendance: 4,500; Referees: Dobrovits, Tájok (HUN)
1 December 2013; 16:00	Jakobsson, Tvedten 6	(13–14)	Glandorf, Mogensen 7	Gigantium, Aalborg; Attendance: 4,500; Referees: Dobrovits, Tájok (HUN)
1 December 2013; 16:00	1× (yellow card) 3× (suspension)	Report	3× (yellow card) 7× (suspension)	Gigantium, Aalborg; Attendance: 4,500; Referees: Dobrovits, Tájok (HUN)

5 February 2014; 20:00	Gorenje (Slovenia)	29 – 36	(Germany) HSV Hamburg	Red Hall, Velenje; Attendance: 1,500; Referees: Togstad, Kristiansen (NOR)
5 February 2014; 20:00	Skube 7	(13–19)	Pfahl 6	Red Hall, Velenje; Attendance: 1,500; Referees: Togstad, Kristiansen (NOR)
5 February 2014; 20:00	3× (yellow card) 2× (suspension)	Report	3× (yellow card) 4× (suspension)	Red Hall, Velenje; Attendance: 1,500; Referees: Togstad, Kristiansen (NOR)

5 February 2014; 20:30	La Rioja (Spain)	25 – 23	(Denmark) Aalborg	Palacio de los Deportes de La Rioja, Logroño; Attendance: 2,500; Referees: Dentz, Reibel (FRA)
5 February 2014; 20:30	Fernández Pérez, Tioumentsev 6	(13–10)	Slundt 9	Palacio de los Deportes de La Rioja, Logroño; Attendance: 2,500; Referees: Dentz, Reibel (FRA)
5 February 2014; 20:30	3× (yellow card) 4× (suspension)	Report	3× (yellow card) 5× (suspension)	Palacio de los Deportes de La Rioja, Logroño; Attendance: 2,500; Referees: Dentz, Reibel (FRA)

8 February 2014; 17:00	Flensburg (Germany)	33 – 25	(Sweden) HK Drott	Campushalle, Flensburg; Attendance: 3,607; Referees: Erdoğan, Özdeniz (TUR)
8 February 2014; 17:00	Radivojević 7	(20–8)	Persson 8	Campushalle, Flensburg; Attendance: 3,607; Referees: Erdoğan, Özdeniz (TUR)
8 February 2014; 17:00	3× (yellow card) 4× (suspension)	Report	3× (yellow card) 2× (suspension)	Campushalle, Flensburg; Attendance: 3,607; Referees: Erdoğan, Özdeniz (TUR)

12 February 2014; 20:55	Flensburg (Germany)	37 – 25	(Spain) La Rioja	Campushalle, Flensburg; Attendance: 3,720; Referees: Pavićević, Ražnatović (MNE)
12 February 2014; 20:55	Gottfridsson, Wanne 6	(19–11)	Masachs 5	Campushalle, Flensburg; Attendance: 3,720; Referees: Pavićević, Ražnatović (MNE)
12 February 2014; 20:55	3× (yellow card) 4× (suspension)	Report	3× (yellow card) 2× (suspension)	Campushalle, Flensburg; Attendance: 3,720; Referees: Pavićević, Ražnatović (MNE)

16 February 2014; 14:15	Aalborg (Denmark)	23 – 28	(Slovenia) Gorenje	Gigantium, Aalborg; Attendance: 4,081; Referees: Pichon, Reveret (FRA)
16 February 2014; 14:15	Larsen 8	(14–15)	Skube 8	Gigantium, Aalborg; Attendance: 4,081; Referees: Pichon, Reveret (FRA)
16 February 2014; 14:15	2× (yellow card) 3× (suspension)	Report	3× (yellow card) 6× (suspension) 1× (red card)	Gigantium, Aalborg; Attendance: 4,081; Referees: Pichon, Reveret (FRA)

16 February 2014; 16:00	HK Drott (Sweden)	24 – 35	(Germany) HSV Hamburg	Halmstad Arena, Halmstad; Attendance: 874; Referees: Herczeg, Südi (HUN)
16 February 2014; 16:00	Persson 7	(12–14)	Schröder 6	Halmstad Arena, Halmstad; Attendance: 874; Referees: Herczeg, Südi (HUN)
16 February 2014; 16:00	3× (yellow card) 5× (suspension) 1× (red card)	Report	3× (yellow card) 2× (suspension)	Halmstad Arena, Halmstad; Attendance: 874; Referees: Herczeg, Südi (HUN)

20 February 2014; 19:30	La Rioja (Spain)	38 – 34	(Sweden) HK Drott	Palacio de los Deportes de La Rioja, Logroño; Attendance: 1,500; Referees: Nikolov, Nachevski (MKD)
20 February 2014; 19:30	Tioumentsev 9	(21–21)	Stenmalm 9	Palacio de los Deportes de La Rioja, Logroño; Attendance: 1,500; Referees: Nikolov, Nachevski (MKD)
20 February 2014; 19:30	3× (yellow card) 3× (suspension)	Report	3× (yellow card) 3× (suspension)	Palacio de los Deportes de La Rioja, Logroño; Attendance: 1,500; Referees: Nikolov, Nachevski (MKD)

22 February 2014; 20:30	Gorenje (Slovenia)	23 – 28	(Germany) Flensburg	Red Hall, Velenje; Attendance: 1,000; Referees: Horáček, Novotný (CZE)
22 February 2014; 20:30	Skube 6	(9–15)	Radivojević, Weinhold 6	Red Hall, Velenje; Attendance: 1,000; Referees: Horáček, Novotný (CZE)
22 February 2014; 20:30	3× (yellow card) 5× (suspension) 1× (red card)	Report	3× (yellow card) 5× (suspension) 1× (red card)	Red Hall, Velenje; Attendance: 1,000; Referees: Horáček, Novotný (CZE)

23 February 2014; 14:15	HSV Hamburg (Germany)	28 – 20	(Denmark) Aalborg	Alsterdorfer Sporthalle, Hamburg; Attendance: 4,000; Referees: Gousko, Repkin (BLR)
23 February 2014; 14:15	Duvnjak 7	(12–9)	Pedersen 5	Alsterdorfer Sporthalle, Hamburg; Attendance: 4,000; Referees: Gousko, Repkin (BLR)
23 February 2014; 14:15	3× (yellow card) 2× (suspension)	Report	2× (yellow card)	Alsterdorfer Sporthalle, Hamburg; Attendance: 4,000; Referees: Gousko, Repkin (BLR)
