= Skube =

Skube is a surname. Notable people with the surname include:

- Bob Skube (born 1957), American baseball player
- Matic Skube (born 1988), Slovene alpine skier
- Michael Skube (born 1986), American journalist
- Sebastian Skube (born 1987), Slovene handball player
- Staš Skube (born 1989), Slovene handball player
