= 2013–14 EHF Champions League qualifying =

This article describes the qualifying for the 2013–14 EHF Champions League.

== Format ==
A total of 14 teams will take part in the qualification tournaments. The clubs will be drawn into three groups of four and play a semifinal and the final. The winner of the qualification groups advance to the group stage, while the eliminated clubs will go to the EHF Cup. Matches will be played at 31 August–1 September 2013. The draw took place on 27 June, at 14:00 local time at Vienna, Austria.

== Seedings ==
Two remaining teams played a knock-out match, the winner went into the group stage.

| Pot 1 | Pot 2 | Pot 3 | Pot 4 |
|---|---|---|---|
| (Belarus) HC Dinamo-Minsk (Bosnia and Herzegovina) RK Borac Banja Luka (Romania) H.C.M. Constanța | (Serbia) RK Vojvodina (Slovakia) HT Tatran Prešov (Portugal) F.C. Porto | (Austria) Alpla HC Hard (Norway) Elverum Håndball (Turkey) Beşiktaş J.K. | (Ukraine) HC Zaporizhzhia (Greece) AEK Athens H.C. (Netherlands) KRAS/Volendam |

== Qualification tournament 1 ==
HT Tatran Prešov organized the tournament.

Semi-finals
31 August 2013
(Belarus) HC Dinamo-Minsk | 25
(Greece) AEK Athens H.C. | 21
31 August 2013
(Slovakia) HT Tatran Prešov | 32
(Turkey) Beşiktaş J.K. | 30

Final
1 September 2013
(Belarus) HC Dinamo-Minsk | 29
(Slovakia) HT Tatran Prešov | 27
Third place
1 September 2013
(Greece) AEK Athens H.C. | 34
(Turkey) Beşiktaş J.K. | 30

=== Semifinals ===
| 31 August 2013; 15:30 | HC Dinamo-Minsk (Belarus) | 25 – 21 | (Greece) AEK Athens H.C. | City Hall Prešov, Prešov; Attendance: 822; Referees: Pavićević, Ražnatović (MNE) |
| 31 August 2013; 15:30 | Nikulenkau 6 | (11–13) | Rakčević 6 | City Hall Prešov, Prešov; Attendance: 822; Referees: Pavićević, Ražnatović (MNE) |
| 31 August 2013; 15:30 | 3× (yellow card) 3× (suspension) | Report | 3× (yellow card) 4× (suspension) | City Hall Prešov, Prešov; Attendance: 822; Referees: Pavićević, Ražnatović (MNE) |

| 31 August 2013; 18:00 | HT Tatran Prešov (Slovakia) | 32 – 30 | (Turkey) Beşiktaş J.K. | City Hall Prešov, Prešov; Attendance: 1,723; Referees: Lorente, Serradilla (ESP) |
| 31 August 2013; 18:00 | Antl 6 | (17–12) | Döne, Rašić 6 | City Hall Prešov, Prešov; Attendance: 1,723; Referees: Lorente, Serradilla (ESP) |
| 31 August 2013; 18:00 | 3× (yellow card) 7× (suspension) | Report | 3× (yellow card) 5× (suspension) 1× (red card) | City Hall Prešov, Prešov; Attendance: 1,723; Referees: Lorente, Serradilla (ESP) |

=== Third place game ===
| 1 September 2013; 15:30 | AEK Athens H.C. (Greece) | 34 – 30 | (Turkey) Beşiktaş J.K. | City Hall Prešov, Prešov; Attendance: 538; Referees: Pavićević, Ražnatović (MNE) |
| 1 September 2013; 15:30 | Bakaoukas 13 | (21–14) | Döne 9 | City Hall Prešov, Prešov; Attendance: 538; Referees: Pavićević, Ražnatović (MNE) |
| 1 September 2013; 15:30 | 3× (yellow card) 3× (suspension) | Report | | City Hall Prešov, Prešov; Attendance: 538; Referees: Pavićević, Ražnatović (MNE) |

=== Final ===
| 1 September 2013; 18:00 | HC Dinamo-Minsk (Belarus) | 29 – 27 | (Slovakia) HT Tatran Prešov | City Hall Prešov, Prešov; Attendance: 3,072; Referees: Lorente, Serradilla (ESP) |
| 1 September 2013; 18:00 | Doborac 7 | (14–13) | Urban 7 | City Hall Prešov, Prešov; Attendance: 3,072; Referees: Lorente, Serradilla (ESP) |
| 1 September 2013; 18:00 | 3× (yellow card) 4× (suspension) | Report | 3× (yellow card) 7× (suspension) | City Hall Prešov, Prešov; Attendance: 3,072; Referees: Lorente, Serradilla (ESP) |

== Qualification tournament 2 ==
RK Vojvodina organized the tournament.

Semi-finals
31 August 2013
(Bosnia and Herzegovina) RK Borac Banja Luka | 18
(Ukraine) HC Motor Zaporizhzhia | 40
31 August 2013
(Serbia) RK Vojvodina | 27
(Austria) Alpla HC Hard | 26

Final
1 September 2013
(Ukraine) HC Motor Zaporizhzhia | 36
(Serbia) RK Vojvodina | 24
Third place
1 September 2013
(Bosnia and Herzegovina) RK Borac Banja Luka | 17
(Austria) Alpla HC Hard | 25

=== Semifinals ===
| 31 August 2013; 17:00 | RK Borac Banja Luka (Bosnia and Herzegovina) | 18 – 40 | (Ukraine) HC Motor Zaporizhzhia | Spens Sports Center, Novi Sad; Attendance: 500; Referees: Kaveshnikov, Plotnikov (RUS) |
| 31 August 2013; 17:00 | Bezbradica 6 | (8–20) | Skopintsev 6 | Spens Sports Center, Novi Sad; Attendance: 500; Referees: Kaveshnikov, Plotnikov (RUS) |
| 31 August 2013; 17:00 | 3× (yellow card) 5× (suspension) | Report | 3× (yellow card) 1× (suspension) | Spens Sports Center, Novi Sad; Attendance: 500; Referees: Kaveshnikov, Plotnikov (RUS) |

| 31 August 2013; 19:30 | RK Vojvodina (Serbia) | 27 – 26 | (Austria) Alpla HC Hard | Spens Sports Center, Novi Sad; Attendance: 1,000; Referees: Cohen, Peretz (ISR) |
| 31 August 2013; 19:30 | Elezović 8 | (10–12) | Jochum 7 | Spens Sports Center, Novi Sad; Attendance: 1,000; Referees: Cohen, Peretz (ISR) |
| 31 August 2013; 19:30 | 3× (yellow card) 6× (suspension) | Report | 3× (yellow card) 5× (suspension) | Spens Sports Center, Novi Sad; Attendance: 1,000; Referees: Cohen, Peretz (ISR) |

=== Third place game ===
| 1 September 2013; 17:00 | RK Borac Banja Luka (Bosnia and Herzegovina) | 17 – 25 | (Austria) Alpla HC Hard | Spens Sports Center, Novi Sad; Attendance: 200; Referees: Kaveshnikov, Plotnikov (RUS) |
| 1 September 2013; 17:00 | Trivundza 5 | (7–12) | Tanasković 5 | Spens Sports Center, Novi Sad; Attendance: 200; Referees: Kaveshnikov, Plotnikov (RUS) |
| 1 September 2013; 17:00 | 3× (yellow card) 4× (suspension) | Report | 3× (yellow card) 5× (suspension) | Spens Sports Center, Novi Sad; Attendance: 200; Referees: Kaveshnikov, Plotnikov (RUS) |

=== Final ===
| 1 September 2013; 19:30 | HC Motor Zaporizhzhia (Ukraine) | 36 – 24 | (Serbia) RK Vojvodina | Spens Sports Center, Novi Sad; Attendance: 1,200; Referees: Cohen, Peretz (ISR) |
| 1 September 2013; 19:30 | Ostroushko 11 | (17–11) | Elezović 5 | Spens Sports Center, Novi Sad; Attendance: 1,200; Referees: Cohen, Peretz (ISR) |
| 1 September 2013; 19:30 | 3× (yellow card) 4× (suspension) 1× (red card) | Report | 3× (yellow card) 4× (suspension) | Spens Sports Center, Novi Sad; Attendance: 1,200; Referees: Cohen, Peretz (ISR) |

== Qualification tournament 3 ==
F.C. Porto organized the tournament.

Semi-finals
31 August 2013
(Portugal) F.C. Porto | 29
(Norway) Elverum Håndball | 28
31 August 2013
(Romania) H.C.M. Constanța | 34
(Netherlands) KRAS/Volendam | 25

Final
1 September 2013
(Portugal) F.C. Porto | 26
(Romania) H.C.M. Constanța | 22
Third place
1 September 2013
(Norway) Elverum Håndball | 32
(Netherlands) KRAS/Volendam | 24

=== Semifinals ===
| 31 August 2013; 14:00 | F.C. Porto (Portugal) | 29 – 28 | (Norway) Elverum Håndball | Dragão Caixa, Porto; Attendance: 1,460; Referees: Horváth, Márton (HUN) |
| 31 August 2013; 14:00 | Davyes, Duarte 6 | (13–13) | Toft 6 | Dragão Caixa, Porto; Attendance: 1,460; Referees: Horváth, Márton (HUN) |
| 31 August 2013; 14:00 | 2× (yellow card) 4× (suspension) | Report | 3× (yellow card) 2× (suspension) | Dragão Caixa, Porto; Attendance: 1,460; Referees: Horváth, Márton (HUN) |

| 31 August 2013; 16:30 | H.C.M. Constanța (Romania) | 34 – 25 | (Netherlands) KRAS/Volendam | Dragão Caixa, Porto; Attendance: 530; Referees: Elíasson, Pálsson (ISL) |
| 31 August 2013; 16:30 | Şimicu 7 | (19–14) | Adams 10 | Dragão Caixa, Porto; Attendance: 530; Referees: Elíasson, Pálsson (ISL) |
| 31 August 2013; 16:30 | 3× (yellow card) 9× (suspension) 1× (red card) | Report | 3× (yellow card) 9× (suspension) 1× (red card) | Dragão Caixa, Porto; Attendance: 530; Referees: Elíasson, Pálsson (ISL) |

=== Third place game ===
| 1 September 2013; 16:30 | KRAS/Volendam (Netherlands) | 24 – 32 | (Norway) Elverum Håndball | Dragão Caixa, Porto; Attendance: 150; Referees: Horváth, Márton (HUN) |
| 1 September 2013; 16:30 | Beemsterboer, Smits 4 | (13–18) | Aanestad 6 | Dragão Caixa, Porto; Attendance: 150; Referees: Horváth, Márton (HUN) |
| 1 September 2013; 16:30 | 3× (yellow card) 3× (suspension) | Report | 3× (yellow card) 8× (suspension) | Dragão Caixa, Porto; Attendance: 150; Referees: Horváth, Márton (HUN) |

=== Final ===
| 1 September 2013; 14:00 | H.C.M. Constanța (Romania) | 22 – 26 | (Portugal) F.C. Porto | Dragão Caixa, Porto; Attendance: 1,704; Referees: Elíasson, Pálsson (ISL) |
| 1 September 2013; 14:00 | Sadoveac 6 | (9–12) | Spinola 9 | Dragão Caixa, Porto; Attendance: 1,704; Referees: Elíasson, Pálsson (ISL) |
| 1 September 2013; 14:00 | 3× (yellow card) 9× (suspension) 2× (red card) | Report | 3× (yellow card) 9× (suspension) 2× (red card) | Dragão Caixa, Porto; Attendance: 1,704; Referees: Elíasson, Pálsson (ISL) |

== Playoff ==
The winner advanced to the group stage.

| Team 1 | Agg. | Team 2 | 1st leg | 2nd leg |
|---|---|---|---|---|
| Handball Esch (Luxembourg) | 44–63 | (Sweden) HK Drott | 30–26 | 14–37 |

=== First leg ===
| 24 August 2013; 18:00 | Handball Esch (Luxembourg) | 30 – 26 | (Sweden) HK Drott | d'Coque, Luxembourg City; Attendance: 500; Referees: Konjičanin, Konjičanin (BIH) |
| 24 August 2013; 18:00 | Kohl 10 | (17–15) | Persson 7 | d'Coque, Luxembourg City; Attendance: 500; Referees: Konjičanin, Konjičanin (BIH) |
| 24 August 2013; 18:00 | 3× (yellow card) 4× (suspension) | Report | 2× (yellow card) 2× (suspension) | d'Coque, Luxembourg City; Attendance: 500; Referees: Konjičanin, Konjičanin (BIH) |

=== Second leg ===
| 31 August 2013; 16:00 | HK Drott (Sweden) | 37 – 14 | (Luxembourg) Handball Esch | Halmstad Arena, Halmstad; Attendance: 1,185; Referees: Erdoğan, Özdeniz (TUR) |
| 31 August 2013; 16:00 | Persson 7 | (19–8) | Kohl, Schmidt 3 | Halmstad Arena, Halmstad; Attendance: 1,185; Referees: Erdoğan, Özdeniz (TUR) |
| 31 August 2013; 16:00 | 2× (yellow card) 4× (suspension) | Report | 3× (yellow card) 4× (suspension) | Halmstad Arena, Halmstad; Attendance: 1,185; Referees: Erdoğan, Özdeniz (TUR) |

HK Drott won 63–44 on aggregate.

== Wildcard matches ==
The winners advanced to the group stage. The schedule and qualifying criteria were changed after Atlético Madrid withdrew.

| Team 1 | Agg. | Team 2 | 1st leg | 2nd leg |
|---|---|---|---|---|
| Füchse Berlin (Germany) | 56–57 | (Germany) HSV Hamburg | 30–30 | 26–27 |
| HC Metalurg (North Macedonia) | 45–39 | (Hungary) SC Pick Szeged | 26–16 | 19–23 |
| Montpellier (France) | 52–55 | (Poland) Wisła Płock | 29–27 | 23–28 |

=== Match 1 ===
==== First leg ====
| 28 August 2013; 19:00 | HC Metalurg (North Macedonia) | 26 – 16 | (Hungary) SC Pick Szeged | Avtokomanda, Skopje; Attendance: 5,000; Referees: Mažeika, Gatelis (LTU) |
| 28 August 2013; 19:00 | Manaskov 6 | (13–11) | Ancsin 5 | Avtokomanda, Skopje; Attendance: 5,000; Referees: Mažeika, Gatelis (LTU) |
| 28 August 2013; 19:00 | 3× (yellow card) 7× (suspension) | Report | 2× (yellow card) 6× (suspension) | Avtokomanda, Skopje; Attendance: 5,000; Referees: Mažeika, Gatelis (LTU) |

==== Second leg ====
| 1 September 2013; 19:00 | SC Pick Szeged (Hungary) | 23 – 19 | (North Macedonia) HC Metalurg | Városi Sportcsarnok, Szeged; Attendance: 3,200; Referees: Schulze, Tönnies (GER) |
| 1 September 2013; 19:00 | Šulc 7 | (11–7) | Atman 5 | Városi Sportcsarnok, Szeged; Attendance: 3,200; Referees: Schulze, Tönnies (GER) |
| 1 September 2013; 19:00 | 3× (yellow card) 5× (suspension) | Report | 3× (yellow card) 5× (suspension) | Városi Sportcsarnok, Szeged; Attendance: 3,200; Referees: Schulze, Tönnies (GER) |

HC Metalurg won 45–39 on aggregate.

=== Match 2 ===
==== First leg ====
| 29 August 2013; 19:00 | Montpellier (France) | 29 – 27 | (Poland) Wisła Płock | Arena Montpellier, Montpellier; Attendance: 3,000; Referees: Caçador, Nicolau (POR) |
| 29 August 2013; 19:00 | Accambray 8 | (11–15) | Ghionea 9 | Arena Montpellier, Montpellier; Attendance: 3,000; Referees: Caçador, Nicolau (POR) |
| 29 August 2013; 19:00 | 3× (yellow card) 3× (suspension) | Report | 3× (yellow card) 6× (suspension) | Arena Montpellier, Montpellier; Attendance: 3,000; Referees: Caçador, Nicolau (POR) |

==== Second leg ====
| 1 September 2013; 16:00 | Wisła Płock (Poland) | 28 – 23 | (France) Montpellier | Orlen Arena, Płock; Attendance: 5,000; Referees: Jurinović, Mrvica (CRO) |
| 1 September 2013; 16:00 | Ghionea 8 | (13–10) | Guigou 5 | Orlen Arena, Płock; Attendance: 5,000; Referees: Jurinović, Mrvica (CRO) |
| 1 September 2013; 16:00 | 3× (yellow card) 2× (suspension) | Report | 3× (yellow card) 3× (suspension) | Orlen Arena, Płock; Attendance: 5,000; Referees: Jurinović, Mrvica (CRO) |

Wisła Płock won 55–52 on aggregate.

=== Match 3 ===
A draw decided that Berlin played the first leg at home.

==== First leg ====
| 21 August 2013; 19:00 | Füchse Berlin (Germany) | 30 – 30 | (Germany) HSV Hamburg | Max-Schmeling-Halle, Berlin; Attendance: 7,128; Referees: Gousko, Repkin (BLR) |
| 21 August 2013; 19:00 | Horák, Igropulo 6 | (18–15) | Lindberg 6 | Max-Schmeling-Halle, Berlin; Attendance: 7,128; Referees: Gousko, Repkin (BLR) |
| 21 August 2013; 19:00 | 3× (yellow card) 3× (suspension) | Report | 3× (yellow card) 2× (suspension) | Max-Schmeling-Halle, Berlin; Attendance: 7,128; Referees: Gousko, Repkin (BLR) |

==== Second leg ====
| 23 August 2013; 19:00 | HSV Hamburg (Germany) | 27 – 26 | (Germany) Füchse Berlin | O² World, Hamburg; Attendance: 6,220; Referees: Stark, Stefan (ROU) |
| 23 August 2013; 19:00 | Pfahl 6 | (10–14) | Petersen 8 | O² World, Hamburg; Attendance: 6,220; Referees: Stark, Stefan (ROU) |
| 23 August 2013; 19:00 | 3× (yellow card) 2× (suspension) | Report | 3× (yellow card) 1× (suspension) | O² World, Hamburg; Attendance: 6,220; Referees: Stark, Stefan (ROU) |

HSV Hamburg won 57–56 on aggregate.
