= Dinamo Minsk =

Dinamo Minsk may refer to:

- FC Dinamo Minsk – Minsk football club
- HC Dinamo Minsk – Minsk ice hockey club
- HC Dinamo Minsk (handball) – Minsk handball club
- Tivali Minsk, a hockey team known as Dynamo Minsk (1977–1993)
