= Skopintsev =

Skopintsev (masculine, Russian: Скопинцев) or Skopintseva (feminine, Russian: Скопинцева) is a Russian surname. Notable people with the surname include:

- Andrei Skopintsev (born 1971), Russian ice hockey player
- Dmitri Skopintsev (born 1997), Russian footballer
- Oleg Skopintsev (born 1984), Russian handball player
