= Magnus Persson =

Magnus Persson may refer to:

- Magnus Persson (handballer), Swedish handball player
- Magnus Persson (politician), Swedish politician
- Magnus Persson Atlevi, Swedish golfer

== See also ==
- Magnus Pehrsson, Swedish football manager and former player
