= Uroš Bundalo =

Slovenian handball player

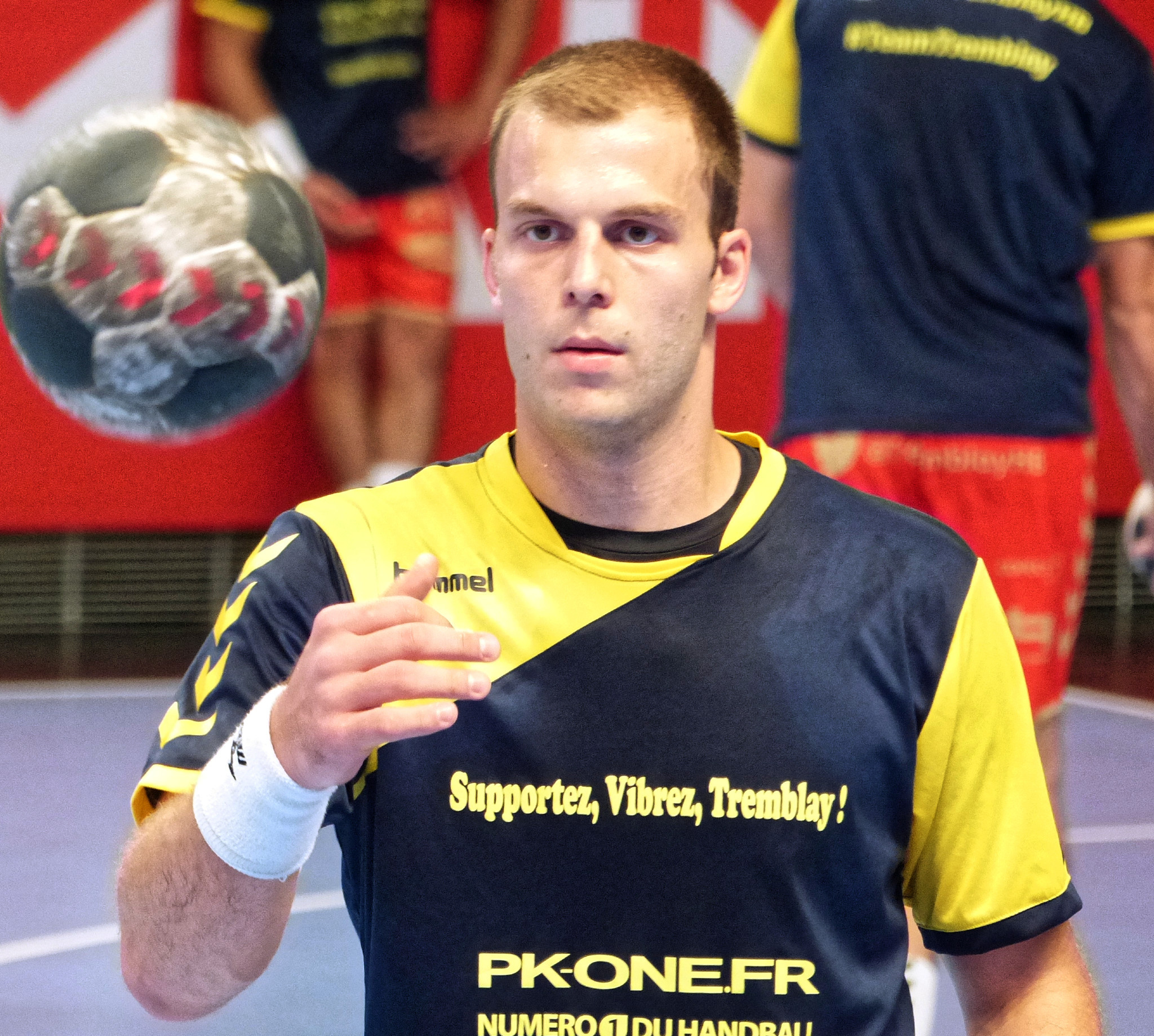

Personal information
- Nationality: Slovenian
- Born: 29 April 1989 (age 37) Ljubljana, SFR Yugoslavia
- Height: 1.98 m (6 ft 6 in)

Sport
- Sport: Handball
- Position: Pivot
- Current club: HC Erlangen
- Number: 6

Senior clubs
- Years: Team
- –2011: RD Slovan
- 2011–2013: RK Koper
- 2013–2014: HC Dinamo Minsk
- 2014: RK Celje
- 2014–2016: Tremblay
- 2016: HBC Nantes
- 2016–2017: HC Erlangen
National team
Years	Team	Apps	(Gls)
2012–2017	Slovenia	52	(49)

Uroš Bundalo (born 29 April 1989) is a professional Slovenian former handball player.

== Career ==
Bundalo started his career at RD Slovan. In 2011 he joined league rivals RK Koper, where he played until 2013. He then joined Belarusian HC Dinamo Minsk. He left the club in 2014 due to the club's financial trouble, which meant they had to release all players. He therefore returned to Slovenia and joined RK Celje for the rest of the season. Here we won the 2014 Slovenian championship.

The following summer he joined French team Tremblay-en-France Handball. After two years he joined league rivals HBC Nantes.

In 2016 he joined German side HC Erlangen. In December 2017 he was released of his contract at HC Erlangen by mutual agreement. He only played 9 matches for the club over 1.5 seasons due to various injuries.

== National team ==
He represented Slovenia at the 2013 World Men's Handball Championship, where Slovenia finished 4th. He also represented them at the 2015 World Men's Handball Championship. He was a part of the extended squad for the 2012 European Championship, but was not selected for the final roster.
