= 2013–14 EHF Champions League =

European handball tournament

EHF Champions League
- 2013–14

Tournament information
- Sport: Handball
- Location: Lanxess Arena (FINAL4)
- Dates: 31 August 2013–1 June 2014
- Teams: 38 (Qualification stage); 24 (Group phase); 16 (Knockout stage)

Final positions
- Champions: (Germany) SG Flensburg-Handewitt (1st title)
- Runner-up: (Germany) THW Kiel

Tournament statistics
- Matches played: 148
- Goals scored: 8338 (56.34 per match)
- Attendance: 651,334 (4,401 per match)
- Top scorer(s): (Serbia) Momir Ilić (103 goals)

The 2013–14 VELUX EHF Champions League was the 54th edition of Europe's premier club handball tournament and the 21st edition under the current EHF Champions League format. HSV Hamburg was the defending champion. The VELUX EHF FINAL4 was played on 31 May–1 June at the Lanxess Arena in Cologne, Germany.

SG Flensburg-Handewitt won the title for the first time after defeating THW Kiel 30–28 in the final.

== Overview ==
=== Team allocation ===
The labels in the parentheses show how each team qualified for the place of its starting round:

- TH: Title holders
- CW: Cup winners
- CR: Cup runners-up
- 2nd, 3rd, 4th, 5th, 6th, etc.: League position

Group stage
(Germany) THW Kiel (1st)	(France) Paris Saint-Germain (1st)	(Slovenia) Gorenje (1st)	(Switzerland) Wacker Thun (1st)
(Germany) Flensburg (2nd)	(France) Dunkerque (2nd)	(Slovenia) Celje (2nd)	(Croatia) Zagreb (1st)
(Germany) Rhein-Neckar Löwen (3rd)	(Denmark) Aalborg (1st)	(Russia) St. Petersburg (2nd)	(Poland) Vive Targi Kielce (1st)
(Spain) Barcelona (1st)	(Denmark) KIF Kolding (2nd)	(Hungary) MKB-MVM Veszprém (1st)	(North Macedonia) Vardar (1st)
(Spain) Logroño (3rd)
Qualifying
Qualification tournament			Wild card tournament
(Romania) HCM Constanța (1st)	(Norway) Elverum (1st)	(Netherlands) KRAS/Volendam (1st)	(Germany) Füchse Berlin (4th)
(Portugal) Porto (1st)	(Belarus) Dinamo-Minsk (1st)	(Luxembourg) Handball Esch (1st)	(Germany) HSV Hamburgth (5th)
(Sweden) HK Drott (1st)	(Greece) AEK Athens (1st)		(France) Montpellier (3rd)
(Serbia) Vojvodina (1st)	(Austria) Alpla HC Hard (1st)		(Hungary) Pick Szeged (2nd)
(Ukraine) Motor Zaporizhzhia (1st)	(Slovakia) Tatran Prešov (1st)		(Poland) Wisła Płock (2nd)
(Bosnia and Herzegovina) Borac Banja Luka (1st)	(Turkey) Beşiktaş (1st)		(North Macedonia) Metalurg (2nd)

== Qualification stage ==
=== Qualification tournaments ===
Fourteen teams took part in the qualification tournaments. Twelve were drawn into three groups of four teams, where they played a semifinal and a final or third place match, while the remaining two teams played a two-legged playoff match. The winners of the qualification tournaments and of the play-off qualified for the group stage, while the eliminated teams were transferred to the 2013–14 EHF Cup. The draw took place on 27 June 2013, at 14:00 local time, in Vienna, Austria. Matches were played on 31 August and 1 September 2013.

==== Seedings ====
Pot 1	Pot 2	Pot 3	Pot 4
(Belarus) Dinamo-Minsk (Bosnia and Herzegovina) Borac Banja Luka (Romania) HCM Constanța	(Serbia) Vojvodina (Slovakia) Tatran Prešov (Portugal) Porto	(Austria) Alpla HC Hard (Norway) Elverum (Turkey) Beşiktaş	(Ukraine) Motor Zaporizhzhia (Greece) AEK Athens (Netherlands) KRAS/Volendam

==== Qualification tournament 1 ====
This qualification tournament was hosted in Prešov, Slovakia, at the home venue of Tatran Prešov.

Semi-finals
31 August 2013
(Belarus) Dinamo-Minsk	25
(Greece) AEK Athens	21
31 August 2013
(Slovakia) Tatran Prešov	32
(Turkey) Beşiktaş	30

Final
1 September 2013
(Belarus) Dinamo-Minsk	29
(Slovakia) Tatran Prešov	27
Third place
1 September 2013
(Greece) AEK Athens	34
(Turkey) Beşiktaş	30

==== Qualification tournament 2 ====
This qualification tournament was hosted in Novi Sad, Serbia, at the home venue of Vojvodina.

Semi-finals
31 August 2013
(Bosnia and Herzegovina) Borac Banja Luka	18
(Ukraine) Motor Zaporizhzhia	40
31 August 2013
(Serbia) Vojvodina	27
(Austria) Alpla HC Hard	26

Final
1 September 2013
(Ukraine) Motor Zaporizhzhia	36
(Serbia) Vojvodina	24
Third place
1 September 2013
(Bosnia and Herzegovina) Borac Banja Luka	17
(Austria) Alpla HC Hard	25

==== Qualification tournament 3 ====
This qualification tournament was hosted in Porto, Portugal, at the home venue of Porto.

Semi-finals
31 August 2013
(Portugal) Porto	29
(Norway) Elverum	28
31 August 2013
(Romania) HCM Constanța	34
(Netherlands) KRAS/Volendam	25

Final
1 September 2013
(Portugal) Porto	26
(Romania) HCM Constanța	22
Third place
1 September 2013
(Netherlands) KRAS/Volendam	24
(Norway) Elverum	32

=== Playoff ===
The winner qualified for the group stage and the losing team entered the 2013–14 EHF Cup second round.

Team 1	Agg.	Team 2	1st leg	2nd leg
Handball Esch (Luxembourg)	44–63	(Sweden) HK Drott	30–26	14–37

=== Wildcard qualification ===
The winners qualified for the group stage and the losing teams entered the 2013–14 EHF Cup third round.

Team 1	Agg.	Team 2	1st leg	2nd leg
Füchse Berlin (Germany)	56–57	(Germany) HSV Hamburg	30–30	26–27
Metalurg (North Macedonia)	45–39	(Hungary) Pick Szeged	26–16	19–23
Montpellier (France)	52–55	(Poland) Wisła Płock	29–27	23–28

== Group phase ==
Location of teams of the 2013–14 EHF Champions League group stage.
Red: Group A; Green: Group B; Blue: Group C; Yellow: Group D.

The draw for the group stage took place at the Gloriette in Vienna on 28 June 2013 at 20:15 local time. A total of 24 teams were drawn into four groups of six. Teams were divided into six pots, based on EHF coefficients. Clubs from the same pot or the same association could not be drawn into the same group, except the wild card tournament winner, which did not enjoy any protection.

Pot 1 (Germany) THW Kiel (Spain) Barcelona (Denmark) Aalborg (Hungary) Veszprém	Pot 2 (Poland) Kielce (Croatia) Zagreb (France) Paris SG (Slovenia) Gorenje	Pot 3 (Germany) Flensburg (Poland) Wisła Płock (Russia) St. Petersburg (North Macedonia) Vardar	Pot 4 (Denmark) KIF Kolding (Switzerland) Wacker Thun (Germany) RN Löwen (Spain) Logroño	Pot 5 (France) Dunkerque (Slovenia) Celje (Sweden) HK Drott (Belarus) Dinamo-Minsk	Pot 6 (Ukraine) Motor (Portugal) Porto (North Macedonia) Metalurg (Germany) HSV Hamburg

Key to colours in group tables
Top four placed teams advanced to the last 16

=== Group A ===
Team	Pld	W	D	L	GF	GA	GD	Pts	VES	RNL	CEL	ZAP	ZAG	PET
(Hungary) MKB-MVM Veszprém	10	8	1	1	303	243	+60	17	—	30–29	27–26	44–27	34–27	29–20
(Germany) Rhein-Neckar Löwen	10	7	2	1	305	252	+53	16	25–25	—	35–25	31–31	34–26	31–17
(Slovenia) Celje	10	4	1	5	269	272	−3	9	26–31	25–28	—	30–27	26–20	29–22
(Ukraine) Motor Zaporizhzhia	10	4	1	5	277	296	−19	9	25–21	26–32	29–32	—	31–30	29–24
(Croatia) Zagreb	10	4	0	6	267	282	−15	8	22–33	24–28	24–21	33–27	—	26–24
(Russia) St. Petersburg	10	0	1	9	216	292	−76	1	15–28	23–32	29–29	18–24	24–35	—

=== Group B ===
Team	Pld	W	D	L	GF	GA	GD	Pts	KIE	KOL	KSK	PLO	POR	DUN
(Germany) THW Kiel	10	8	1	1	298	268	+30	17	—	29–26	28–28	34–25	30–25	28–25
(Denmark) KIF Kolding	10	7	0	3	249	240	+9	14	24–26	—	29–24	23–22	25–20	26–24
(Poland) Vive Targi Kielce	10	6	1	3	307	276	+31	13	34–29	25–26	—	38–30	35–23	33–23
(Poland) Wisła Płock	10	4	0	6	275	277	−2	8	33–34	25–26	28–30	—	28–22	32–25
(Portugal) Porto	10	2	1	7	241	278	−37	5	27–31	27–24	30–35	20–24	—	22–21
(France) Dunkerque	10	1	1	8	237	268	−31	3	21–29	18–20	30–25	25–28	25–25	—

=== Group C ===
Team	Pld	W	D	L	GF	GA	GD	Pts	BAR	PSG	MET	VAR	MIN	THU
(Spain) Barcelona	10	8	1	1	348	256	+92	17	—	38–28	35–17	30–23	35–25	45–26
(France) Paris Saint-Germain	10	6	1	3	315	288	+27	13	29–33	—	32–29	35–25	34–30	38–24
(North Macedonia) Metalurg	10	5	2	3	256	265	−9	12	31–29	28–26	—	22–27	33–29	24–24
(North Macedonia) Vardar	10	4	2	4	269	263	+6	10	29–29	24–24	18–26	—	30–22	32–25
(Belarus) Dinamo-Minsk	10	3	1	6	266	295	−29	7	25–35	29–35	23–23	26–24	—	27–20
(Switzerland) Wacker Thun	10	0	1	9	242	329	−87	1	23–39	28–34	22–23	24–37	26–30	—

=== Group D ===
Team	Pld	W	D	L	GF	GA	GD	Pts	HAM	FLE	GOR	AAH	RIO	HKD
(Germany) HSV Hamburg	10	9	0	1	330	266	+64	18	—	32–27	41–32	28–20	34–27	39–30
(Germany) Flensburg	10	8	1	1	314	272	+42	17	27–24	—	35–31	31–27	37–25	33–25
(Slovenia) Gorenje	10	4	0	6	307	320	−13	8	29–36	23–28	—	25–30	33–28	35–33
(Denmark) Aalborg	10	4	0	6	275	265	+10	8	26–28	26–27	23–28	—	28–24	37–24
(Spain) La Rioja	10	3	2	5	292	320	−28	8	24–33	32–32	34–31	25–23	—	38–34
(Sweden) HK Drott	10	0	1	9	289	364	−75	1	24–35	27–37	32–40	26–35	35–35	—

== Knockout stage ==
=== Last 16 ===
The draw was held on 25 February 2014 at 12:00 in Vienna, Austria. The first legs were played on 20–23 March, and the second legs on 29–31 March 2014.

==== Seedings ====
Pot 1	Pot 2	Pot 3	Pot 4
(Hungary) MKB-MVM Veszprém (Germany) THW Kiel (Spain) Barcelona (Germany) HSV Hamburg	(Germany) Rhein-Neckar Löwen (Denmark) KIF Kolding (France) Paris Saint-Germain (Germany) Flensburg	(Slovenia) RK Celje (Poland) Vive Targi Kielce (North Macedonia) Metalurg Skopje (Slovenia) Gorenje	(Ukraine) Motor Zaporizhzhia (Poland) Wisła Płock (North Macedonia) Vardar (Denmark) Aalborg

==== Matches ====
Team 1	Agg.	Team 2	1st leg	2nd leg
Motor Zaporizhzhia (Ukraine)	56–71	(Germany) THW Kiel	28–31	28–40
Aalborg (Denmark)	42–60	(Spain) Barcelona	22–29	20–31
Vardar (North Macedonia)	58–57	(Germany) HSV Hamburg	28–28	30–29
Wisła Płock (Poland)	60–64	(Hungary) MKB-MVM Veszprém	34–33	26–31
Gorenje (Slovenia)	55–62	(France) Paris Saint-Germain	30–28	25–34
Celje (Slovenia)	53–55	(Germany) Flensburg	26–25	27–30
Metalurg Skopje (North Macedonia)	53–43	(Denmark) KIF Kolding	23–17	30–26
Vive Targi Kielce (Poland)	55–55	(Germany) Rhein-Neckar Löwen	32–28	23–27

=== Quarter-finals ===
The draw was held on 1 April 2014 at 12:15 in Vienna, Austria. The first legs were played on 19–21 April, and the second legs on 26–27 April 2014.

==== Seedings ====
Pot 1	Pot 2
(Hungary) MKB-MVM Veszprém	(Germany) Rhein-Neckar Löwen
(Germany) THW Kiel	(North Macedonia) Metalurg Skopje
(Spain) Barcelona	(France) Paris Saint-Germain
(North Macedonia) Vardar	(Germany) Flensburg

==== Matches ====
Team 1	Agg.	Team 2	1st leg	2nd leg
Rhein-Neckar Löwen (Germany)	62–62	(Spain) Barcelona	38–31	24–31
Flensburg (Germany)	49–49	(North Macedonia) Vardar	24–22	25–27
Metalurg Skopje (North Macedonia)	47–65	(Germany) THW Kiel	21–31	26–34
Paris Saint-Germain (France)	52–59	(Hungary) MKB-MVM Veszprém	26–28	26–31

=== Final four ===
The draw was held on 29 April 2014.

Semi-finals
31 May
(Spain) Barcelona	39
(Germany) Flensburg (pen.)	41
31 May
(Hungary) MKB-MVM Veszprém	26
(Germany) THW Kiel	29

Final
1 June
(Germany) Flensburg	30
(Germany) THW Kiel	28
Third place
1 June
(Spain) Barcelona	26
(Hungary) MKB-MVM Veszprém	25

== Awards ==
The All-star team of the Champions League 2013/14

Position	Player
Goalkeeper	(Denmark) Niklas Landin Jacobsen (Rhein-Neckar Löwen)
Right wing	(France) Luc Abalo (Paris Saint-Germain)
Right back	(North Macedonia) Kiril Lazarov (Barcelona)
Centre back	(Denmark) Mikkel Hansen (Paris Saint-Germain)
Left back	(Serbia) Momir Ilić (MKB-MVM Veszprém)
Left wing	(Russia) Timur Dibirov (RK Vardar)
Pivot	(Croatia) Renato Sulić (MKB-MVM Veszprém)
Final four MVP	(Iceland) Aron Palmarsson (THW Kiel)
Best defender	(Hungary) Timuzsin Schuch (MKB-MVM Veszprém)

Final four MVP: (Iceland) Aron Palmarsson

== See also ==
- 2013–14 EHF Cup
