= 2012–13 Slovenian First League (men's handball) =

Slovenian First League
- Season: 2012–13
- Champions: Gorenje
- Relegated: Koper
- Champions League: Gorenje; Celje
- EHF Cup: Maribor

The 2012–13 Slovenian First League was the 22nd season of the 1. A liga, Slovenia's premier handball league.

== Teams information ==
Location of teams in the 2012–13 Slovenian First League

Team	Location	Arena	Capacity
Celje	Celje	Zlatorog Arena	5,191
Gorenje	Velenje	Red Hall	2,500
Izola	Izola	Kraška Sports Hall	700
Jeruzalem Ormož	Ormož	Hardek Hall	700
Koper	Koper	Bonifika Hall	3,000
Krka	Novo Mesto	Marof Hall	1,200
Krško	Krško	Krško Sports Hall	800
Maribor Branik	Maribor	Tabor Hall	3,261
Ribnica	Ribnica	Ribnica Sports Centre	600
Sevnica	Sevnica	Sevnica Sports Hall	600
SVIŠ	Ivančna Gorica	OŠ Stična Hall	500
Trimo Trebnje	Trebnje	OŠ Trebnje Hall	800

== Regular season ==
=== Standings ===
	Team	Pld	W	D	L	GF	GA	Diff	Pts
1	Gorenje	22	21	0	1	762	550	+212	42
2	Celje	22	19	1	2	661	491	+170	39
3	Koper	22	15	3	4	729	605	+124	33
4	Maribor Branik	22	15	2	5	715	604	+111	32
5	Trimo Trebnje	22	10	3	9	693	654	+39	23
6	Krka	22	8	6	8	638	637	+1	22
7	SVIŠ	22	8	2	12	585	660	–75	18
8	Ribnica	22	7	2	13	635	685	–50	16
9	Jeruzalem Ormož	22	6	2	14	616	712	–96	14
10	Izola	22	6	2	14	511	597	–86	14
11	Sevnica	22	4	0	18	514	694	–80	8
12	Krško	22	1	1	20	542	716	–174	3

Champion Playoff
Relegation Round

Pld – Played; W – Won; L – Lost; PF – Points for; PA – Points against; Diff – Difference; Pts – Points.

== Championship play-offs ==
=== Standings ===
	Team	Pld	W	D	L	GF	GA	Diff	Pts	Qualification
1	Gorenje	10	9	0	1	362	281	+81	60	2013–14 EHF Champions League group stage
2	Celje	10	6	2	2	300	262	+38	53	2013–14 EHF Champions League group stage
3	Koper	10	4	2	4	308	309	–1	43	
4	Maribor Branik	10	5	1	4	285	288	–3	43	2013–14 EHF Cup second qualifying round
5	Trimo Trebnje	10	2	1	7	286	320	–34	28	
6	Krka	10	1	0	9	245	326	–81	24	

Pld – Played; W – Won; L – Lost; PF – Points for; PA – Points against; Diff – Difference; Pts – Points.

=== Results ===
In the table below the home teams are listed on the left and the away teams along the top.

	CEL	VEL	KOP	KRK	MAR	TRE
Celje		26–29	26–26	37–20	26–24	38–24
Gorenje	35–30		38–34	36–23	40–28	38–31
Koper	31–36	33–27		33–28	32–29	33–31
Krka	23–28	20–41	32–25		25–31	24–26
Maribor Branik	22–22	23–40	29–28	37–26		32–20
Trimo Trebnje	28–30	33–38	33–33	31–24	29–30	

== Relegation round ==
	Team	Pld	W	D	L	GF	GA	Diff	Pts	Relegation
1	Ribnica	10	6	0	4	281	259	+22	28	
2	SVIŠ	10	5	0	5	270	294	–24	28	
3	Izola	10	6	1	3	297	273	+24	27	
4	Jeruzalem Ormož	10	4	1	5	306	307	–1	23	
5	Sevnica	10	4	0	6	292	304	–12	16	
6	Krško	10	4	0	6	294	303	–9	11	

Pld – Played; W – Won; L – Lost; PF – Points for; PA – Points against; Diff – Difference; Pts – Points.
