= Steffen Weinhold =

German handball player (born 1986)

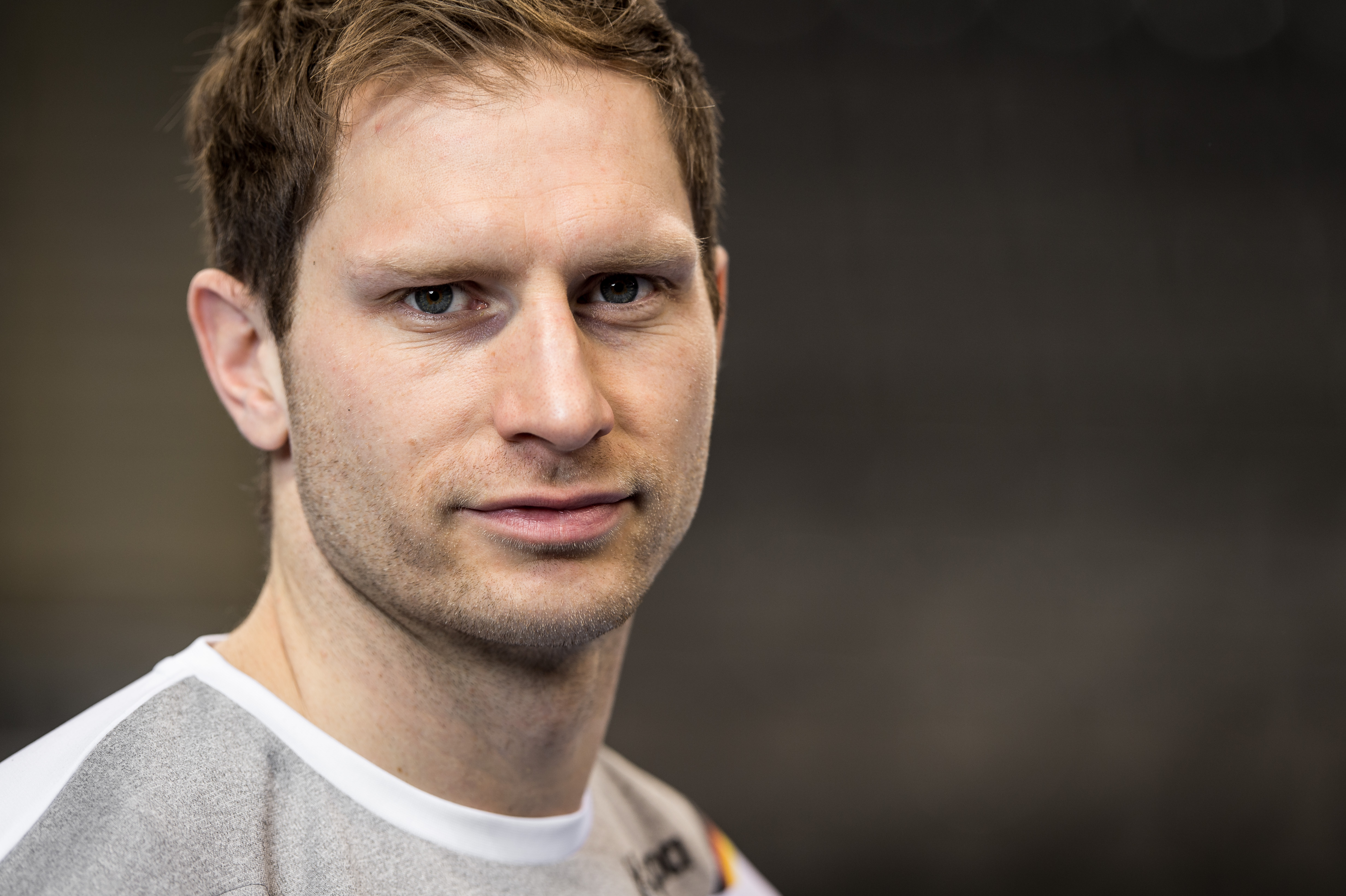
- Weinhold in 2018

Personal information
- Nationality: German
- Born: 19 July 1986 (age 40) Fürth, West Germany
- Height: 1.91 m (6 ft 3 in)

Sport
- Sport: Handball
- Position: Right back / Centre back
- Current club: THW Kiel
- Number: 13

Youth career
- Years: Team
- –: TSV Altenberg
- –: TSV Zirndorf

Senior clubs
- Years: Team
- 2003–2007: HC Erlangen
- 2007–2009: HSG Nordhorn-Lingen
- 2009–2012: TV Grosswallstadt
- 2012–2014: SG Flensburg-Handewitt
- 2014–2024: THW Kiel
National team
Years	Team	Apps	(Gls)
2008–2021	Germany	137	(336)
Medal record
Olympic Games
Bronze medal – third place	2016 Rio de Janeiro	Team
European Championship
Gold medal – first place	2016 Poland

Steffen Weinhold (born 19 July 1986) is a German former professional handball player for THW Kiel. In 2016 he was part of the German team that won the European Championship. In 2021 he announced the end of his time in the German national team. He has previously been the captain of the German national team.

== Career ==
Weinhold played for various team in his youth before joining HC Erlangen from HG Zirndorf, a club in Fürth, Bavaria at the age of 15. He won the European Youth championship in 2006.

At the age of 17 he debuted for the Erlangen first team in the 2. Bundesliga. In 2007 he joined Bundesliga team HSG Nordhorn, where he won the EHF Cup in 2008. In 2009 he joined TV Großwallstadt, where he played for three years before joining SG Flensburg-Handewitt. Here he won the 2013-14 EHF Champions League.

In 2014 he joined THW Kiel. Here he won both the German Championship, DHB-Pokal and the 2019-20 EHF Champions League. He left Kiel after the 2023-24 season.

=== Club statistics ===
Season	Team	League	Games	Goals	Penalty Goals	Outfield goals
2007/08	HSG Nordhorn	Bundesliga	34	19	0	19
2008/09	HSG Nordhorn	Bundesliga	34	100	0	100
2009/10	TV Großwallstadt	Bundesliga	34	129	0	129
2010/11	TV Großwallstadt	Bundesliga	32	113	0	113
2011/12	TV Großwallstadt	Bundesliga	24	67	0	67
2012/13	SG Flensburg-Handewitt	Bundesliga	34	91	0	91
2013/14	SG Flensburg-Handewitt	Bundesliga	32	117	6	111
2014/15	THW Kiel	Bundesliga	33	99	0	99
2015/16	THW Kiel	Bundesliga	21	58	1	58
2016/17	THW Kiel	Bundesliga	21	60	0	60
2017/18	THW Kiel	Bundesliga	27	82	0	82
2018/19	THW Kiel	Bundesliga	31	94	0	94
2019/20	THW Kiel	Bundesliga	20	46	0	46
2020/21	THW Kiel	Bundesliga	37	70	0	70
2021/22	THW Kiel	Bundesliga	32	69	0	69
2022/23	THW Kiel	Bundesliga	15	44	0	44
2023/24	THW Kiel	Bundesliga	19	30	0	30
2007–2024	Total	Bundesliga	480	1288	7	1281

=== National team ===
Weinhold debuted for the German national team on February 27th, 2008 under coach Heiner Brand in a friendly against Switzerland.

At the 2013 World Championship he won the player of the match award in the first game.

At the 2016 European Championship, he was the captain of the German team, when Uwe Gensheimer was not available. In the initial round match against Slovenia, he won the player of the match award. In the main round game against Russia, he got a torn muscle injury, and could not complete the tournament. In his absence, Germany won the final against Spain, and he became a European champion.

At the 2016 Olympics he was not initially in the team, but was called in to replace injured Patrick Groetzki. Here he won a bronze medal with the German team, forwhich he was awarded the Silbernes Lorbeerblatt.

He played his 100th game for Germany in a friendly against Iceland on 7 January 2018.

He also represented Germany at the 2020 Olympics in Tokyo. After the Olympics he retired from the national team, but continued to compete at club level.

== Achievements ==
- Summer Olympics:
  - Bronze: 2016
- European Championship:
  - Gold: 2016
- EHF Champions League:
  - Gold: 2014, 2020
- EHF Cup:
  - Gold: 2019
- German Championship:
  - Gold: 2015, 2020, 2021, 2023
- DHB-Pokal:
  - Gold: 2017, 2019, 2022
- DHB-Supercup
  - Gold: 2016, 2017, 2020, 2021, 2022, 2023
