= Ivan Ninčević =

Croatian handball player (born 1981)

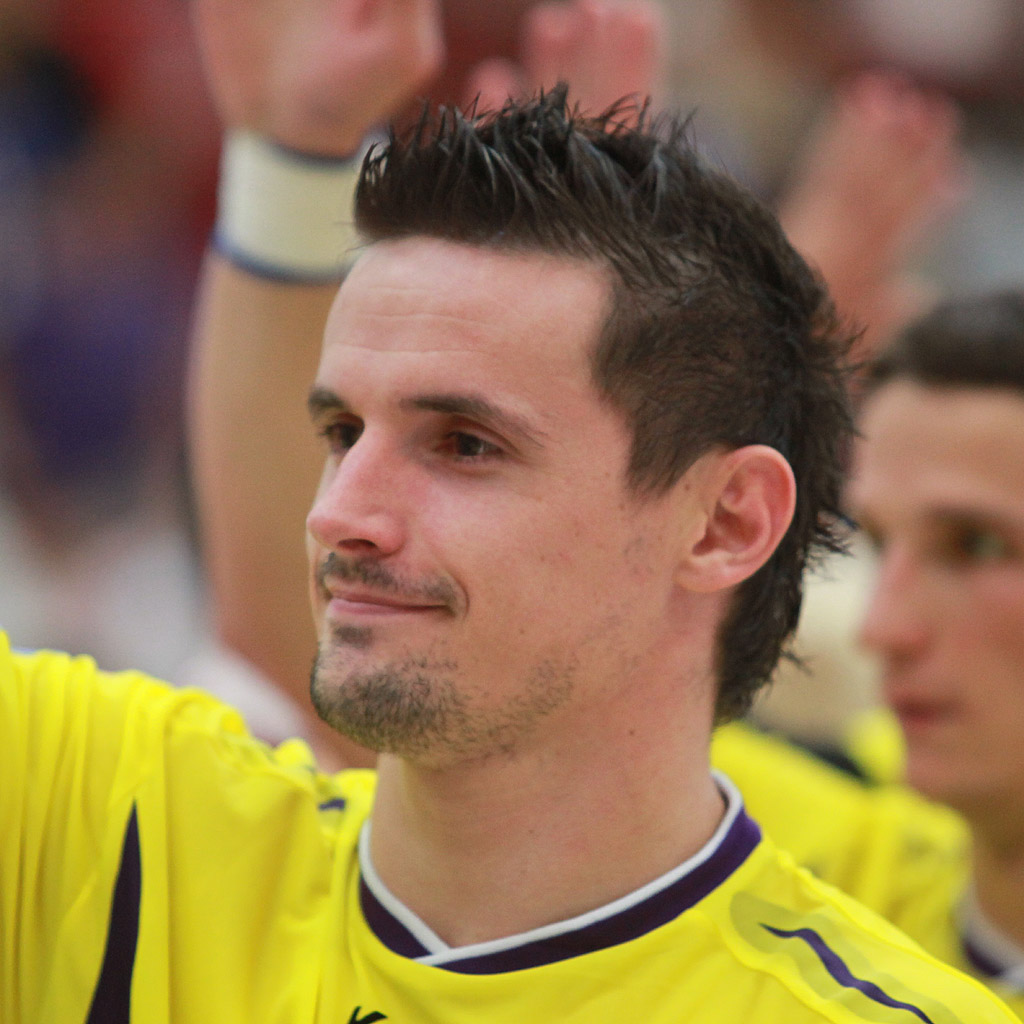

Personal information
- Nationality: Croatian
- Born: 27 November 1981 (age 44) Zadar, Croatia
- Height: 1.84 m (6 ft 0 in)

Sport
- Sport: Handball
- Position: Left wing

Senior clubs
- Years: Team
- 1998-2000: Zadar
- 2000-2005: Zagreb
- 2005-2006: HSG Niesetal-Staufenberg
- 2006-2009: Stralsunder HV
- 2009-2010: Zadar
- 2010-2013: Füchse Berlin
- 2013-2014: Dinamo Minsk
- 2014-2017: Beşiktaş JK
National team
| Years | Team | Apps | (Gls) |
| 2009– | Croatia | 65 | (96) |
Medal record
Olympic Games
| Bronze medal – third place | 2012 London | Team |
World Championships
| Bronze medal – third place | 2013 Spain | Team |
European Championships
| Bronze medal – third place | 2012 Serbia | Team |

Ivan Ninčević (born 27 November 1981) is a former Croatian handball player. He competed for the Croatian national team at the 2012 Summer Olympics in London, winning the bronze medal.

== Honours ==
Zagreb

- Croatian First League (5): 2000–01, 2001–02, 2002–03, 2003–04, 2004–05
- Croatian Cup (5): 2001, 2002, 2003, 2004, 2005
- EHF Cup Winners' Cup Runner-up (1): 2005
