= Sebastian Skube =

Slovenian handball player

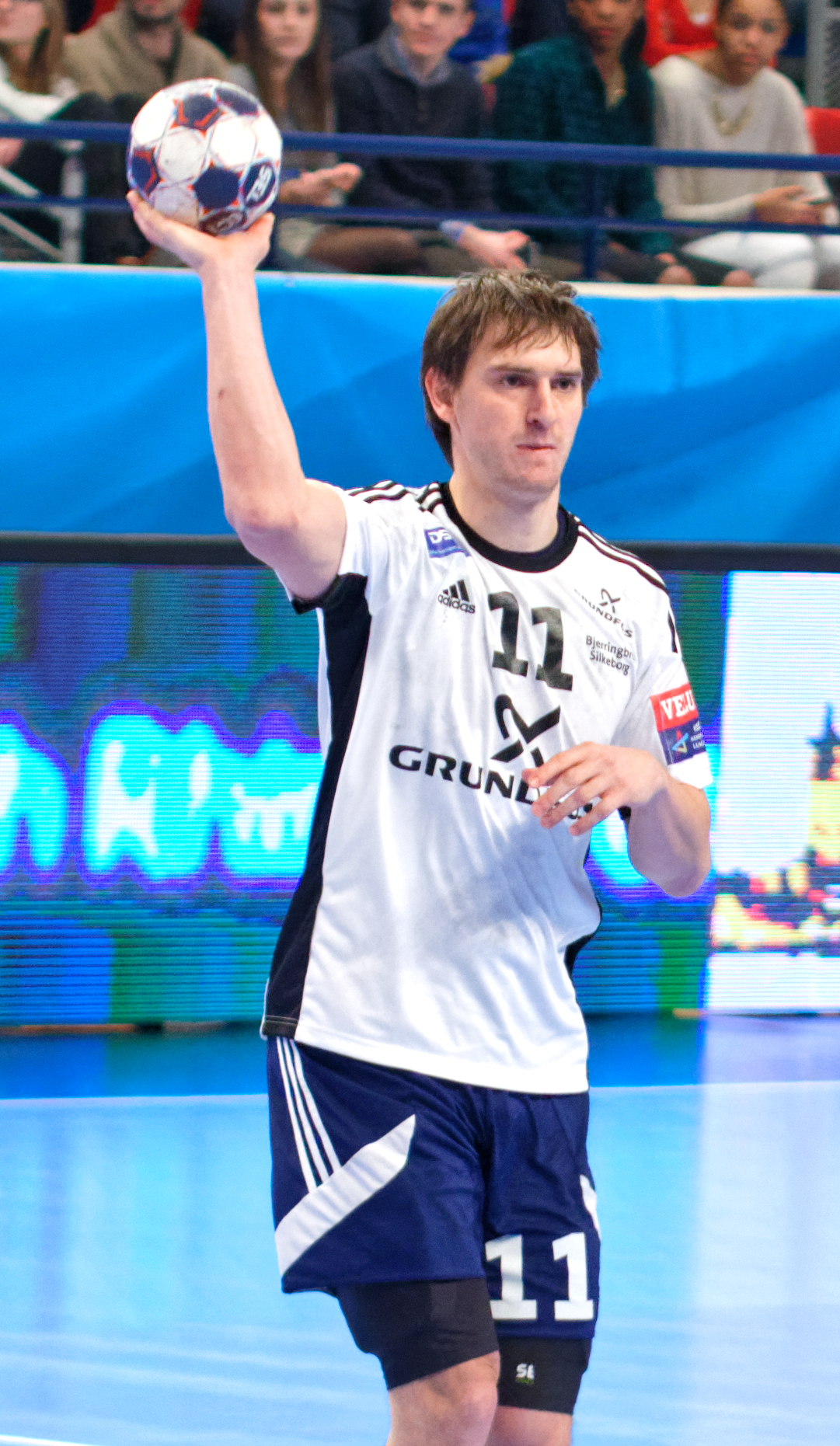

Personal information
- Nationality: Slovenian
- Born: 3 April 1987 (age 39) Novo Mesto, SFR Yugoslavia
- Height: 1.89 m (6 ft 2 in)

Sport
- Sport: Handball
- Position: Centre back
- Current club: Chambéry SMBH
- Number: 11

Senior clubs
- Years: Team
- 2005–2010: RK Trimo Trebnje
- 2010–2012: RK Koper
- 2012–2014: RK Celje
- 2014–2021: Bjerringbro-Silkeborg
- 2021–: Chambéry SMBH
National team
Years	Team	Apps	(Gls)
2007–2016	Slovenia	129	(281)

Sebastian Skube (born 3 April 1987) is a Slovenian professional handball player who plays for Chambéry SMBH. He represented Slovenia at the 2013 World Men's Handball Championship. He is the older brother of Staš Skube.
