= Staš Skube =

Slovenian handball player (born 1989)

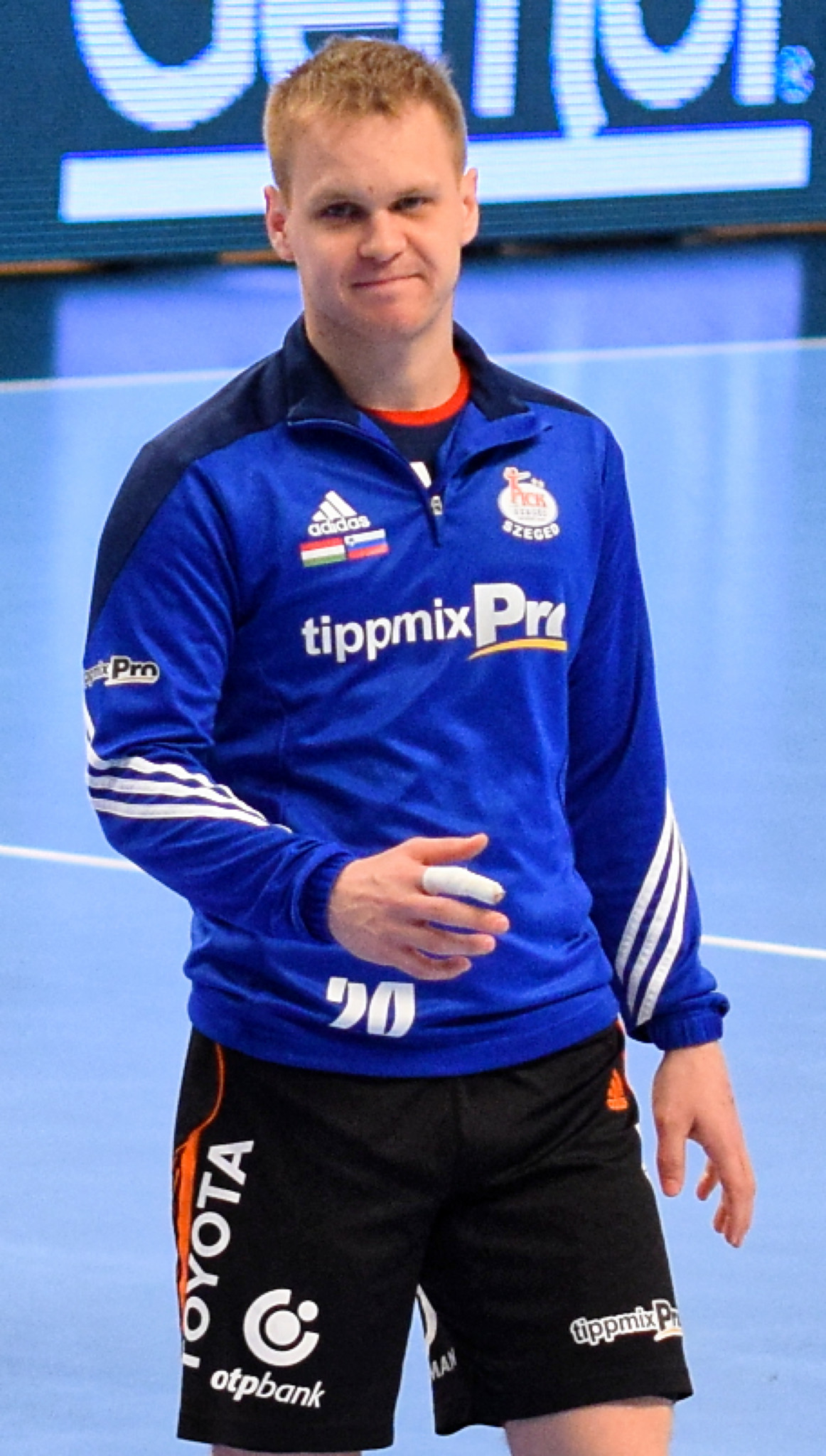

Personal information
- Nationality: Slovenian
- Born: 15 November 1989 (age 36) Novo Mesto, SFR Yugoslavia
- Height: 1.79 m (5 ft 10 in)

Sport
- Sport: Handball
- Position: Centre back
- Current club: RD Slovan
- Number: 61

Senior clubs
- Years: Team
- 2006–2013: RK Trimo Trebnje
- 2013–2016: RK Gorenje Velenje
- 2016–2018: SC Pick Szeged
- 2018–2020: RK Vardar
- 2020–2022: HC Meshkov Brest
- 2022–2025: Montpellier Handball
- 2025–: RD Slovan
National team
Years	Team	Apps	(Gls)
2013–2022	Slovenia	33	(61)

Staš Skube (born 15 November 1989) is a Slovenian handball player who plays for RD Slovan.

His older brother is Sebastian Skube.

== Career ==
Skube started his career in 2006 with RK Trimo Trebnje. In 2013, he moved to RK Gorenje Velenje. After three seasons, he transferred to SC Pick Szeged. In June 2018, Skube joined RK Vardar.
