= Magnus Persson (handballer) =

Swedish handball player (born 1990)

Personal information
- Nationality: Swedish
- Born: 17 December 1990 (age 35) Snostorp, Sweden
- Height: 1.92 m (6 ft 4 in)

Sport
- Sport: Handball
- Position: Right back
- Current club: IK Sävehof
- Number: 10

Youth career
- Years: Team
- –: HK Drott

Senior clubs
- Years: Team
- 2008-2014: HK Drott
- 2014-2016: VfL Gummersbach
- 2016-2018: Alingsås HK
- 2018-2024: HK Malmö
- 2024-: IK Sävehof
National team
Years	Team	Apps	(Gls)
2013-2016	Sweden	32	(34)
- Updated on 15 September 2019

Magnus Persson (born 17 December 1990) is a Swedish handball player for IK Sävehof and previously the Swedish national team.

== Career ==
Persson started his career at HK Drott. Here he became Swedish champions in 2013.

He then joined VfL Gummersbach, where he played from 2014 to 2016, before he returned to Sweden.

=== National team ===
He debuted for the Swedish national team on 4 June 2013 against Poland. He then represented Sweden at the 2014 European Men's Handball Championship and at the 2015 World Men's Handball Championship.
