= Oleg Skopintsev =

Russian handball player

Personal information
- Nationality: Russian
- Born: 15 April 1984 (age 42) Krasnodar, Russia
- Height: 1.84 m (6 ft 0 in)

Sport
- Sport: Handball
- Position: Left wing
- Current club: Motor Zaporizhzhia
- Number: 9
National team
Years	Team	Apps	(Gls)
–	Russia	47	(63)

Oleg Skopintsev (born 15 April 1984) is a Russian handball player for Motor Zaporizhzhia and the Russian national team.
