= HC Dinamo Minsk (handball) =

Belarusian handball club

HC Dinamo-Minsk
- Full name: Dinamo-Minsk Handball Club
- Founded: 2008
- Dissolved: 2014
- Arena: Minsk Sports Palace
- President: Andrey Parashchenko
- Head coach: Mikhail Majewski
- League: Belarusian First League of Handball
- 2012/2013: Champion
- Club colours
Home	Away

Handball Club Dinamo-Minsk is a former team handball club from Minsk, Belarus. Currently, HC Dinamo-Minsk competes in the Belarus First League of Handball. HC Dinamo-Minsk is a five-time Belarus league champion (2009, 2010, 2011, 2012, 2013 ), winner of the Baltic League (2009), winner of the Cup of Belarus (2010) and the finalist of the Cup of Belarus (2009). Due to financial troubles, the club was dissolved in 2014.

== Notable former players ==
- (Slovenia) Dean Bombač (2013-2014)
- (Russia) Pavel Atman
- (Montenegro) Rade Mijatović
- (Serbia) Ratko Nikolić
- (Serbia) Dimitrije Pejanović
- (Russia) Oleg Skopintsev
- (Ukraine) Sergiy Onufriyenko (2009–2013)
