= 2012 European Men's Handball Championship qualification =

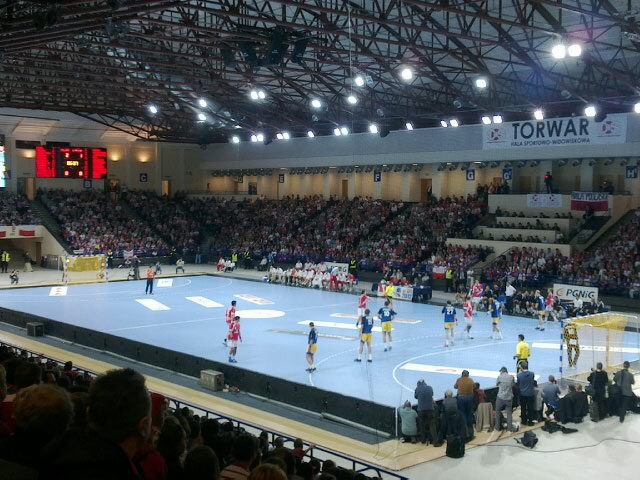
2012 European Handball Championship Qualification, match Poland-Ukraine, Torwar Hall, Warsaw, 28.10.2010

This article describes the qualification for the 2012 European Men's Handball Championship.

== Qualification system ==
=== Seeding ===
The draw for the qualification round was held on 31 January 2010 at the EHF headquarters, in Vienna, Austria. Serbia (host nation), and France (defending champion), were directly qualified. 39 teams (including Serbia) had registered for participation. 37 teams competed for 14 places at the final tournament in 2 distinct Qualification Phases. In each phase, the teams were divided into several pots according to their positions in the EHF National Team Ranking list valid for the EHF EURO 2012 Qualification in Serbia.

==== Seeding for Qualification Phase 1 ====
Pot 1	Pot 2	Pot 3	Pot 4
Latvia; Israel; Estonia	Italy; 2 teams between: Belgium; Bulgaria; Cyprus	Finland; Turkey; 1 team between: Belgium; Bulgaria; Cyprus	Luxembourg; Georgia; Great Britain

==== Seeding for Qualification Phase 2 ====
The seedings were completely known after the playing of the final week-end of the 2010 European Men's Handball Championship.

Pot 1	Pot 2	Pot 3	Pot 4
Croatia; Denmark; Poland; Germany; Norway; Sweden; Hungary	Spain; Iceland; Czech Republic; Slovenia; Russia; Slovakia; Macedonia	Austria; Montenegro; Belarus; Ukraine; Romania; Bosnia and Herzegovina; Netherlands	Portugal; Switzerland; Greece; Lithuania; Estonia; Latvia; Israel

=== Playing dates ===
- Qualification Phase 1:

Two options were available:

- Tournaments: 11–13 June 2010
- Home and away round robin: 14/15 April 2010, 17/18 April 2010, 9/10 June 2010, 12/13 June 2010, 16/17 June 2010, 19/20 June 2010

=== Tiebreakers ===
If two or more teams are equal on points on completion of the group matches, the following criteria are applied to determine the rankings.

1. Higher number of points obtained in the group matches played among the teams in question.
2. Superior goal difference from the group matches played among the teams in question.
3. Higher number of goals scored in the group matches played among the teams in question.
4. If, after applying criteria 1) to 3) to several teams, two or more teams still have an equal ranking, the criteria 1) to 3) will be reapplied to determine the ranking of these teams. If this procedure does not lead to a decision, criteria 5), 6) and 7) will apply.
5. Superior goal difference from all group matches played.
6. Higher number of goals scored in all group matches played.
7. Drawing of lots.

== Qualification Phase 1 ==
The participating teams were the 12 lowest ranked according to the EHF National Team Ranking list valid for the EHF EURO 2012 Qualification in Serbia.
They were: Belgium, Bulgaria, Cyprus, Estonia, Finland, Great Britain, Georgia, Israel, Italy, Latvia, Luxembourg and Turkey.
The 12 teams divided into 3 groups, with the 3 winners advancing to the Qualification Phase 2.

=== Draw procedure ===
- Step 1: 2 teams from Belgium, Bulgaria, Cyprus were drawn to pot 2. The remaining team went to pot 3 (the balls were not opened).
- Step 2: 3 teams of pot 1 to row 1
- Step 3: 3 teams of pot 2 to row 2
- Step 4: 3 teams of pot 3 to row 3
- Step 5: 3 teams of pot 4 to row 4

=== Group 1 ===
Venue: Crystal Palace National Sports Centre, London

Pos	Team	Pld	W	D	L	GF	GA	GD	Pts	Qualification
1	Estonia	3	3	0	0	100	72	+28	6	Qualification Phase 2
2	Cyprus	3	1	1	1	81	79	+2	3	
3	Great Britain (H)	3	1	0	2	75	91	−16	2	
4	Bulgaria	3	0	1	2	79	93	−14	1	

(H) Hosts

10 June 2010
14:30

BST (UTC+01)

Estonia
31 – 18
Bulgaria

Attendance: 200
Referees: Mäkinen, Jonsson (SWE)
Patrail 7
(16 – 9)
Mihailov 5
3× (yellow card) 3× (suspension)
Report
2× (yellow card) 4× (suspension)

10 June 2010
18:30

BST (UTC+01)

Cyprus
24 – 16
Great Britain

Attendance: 300
Referees: Leyder, Jung (LUX)
Papakyprianou 9
(7 – 9)
Hawkins, Larsson 4
3× (yellow card) 5× (suspension)
Report
3× (yellow card) 7× (suspension)

11 June 2010
14:30

BST (UTC+01)

Bulgaria
29 – 29
Cyprus

Attendance: 100
Referees: Leyder, Jung (LUX)
Borisov, Mihailov 6
(14 – 14)
Demosthenous, Efstathiadis, Papakyprianou 5
3× (yellow card) 5× (suspension)
Report
3× (yellow card) 5× (suspension)

11 June 2010
18:30

BST (UTC+01)

Great Britain
26 – 35
Estonia

Attendance: 400
Referees: Mäkinen, Jonsson (SWE)
Mohr 11
(13 – 18)
Patrail 7
3× (yellow card) 6× (suspension) 1× (red card)
Report
3× (yellow card) 2× (suspension)

12 June 2010
12:00

BST (UTC+01)

Estonia
34 – 28
Cyprus

Attendance: 300
Referees: Mäkinen, Jonsson (SWE)
Patrail 9
(18 – 13)
Papakyprianou 11
2× (yellow card) 3× (suspension)
Report
4× (yellow card) 3× (suspension)

12 June 2010
15:30

BST (UTC+01)

Bulgaria
32 – 33
Great Britain

Attendance: 600
Referees: Leyder, Jung (LUX)
Petkov 10
(16 – 14)
Larsson 13
3× (yellow card) 6× (suspension) 1× (red card)
Report
3× (yellow card) 2× (suspension) 1× (red card)

=== Group 2 ===
Venue: Tbilisi Sports Palace, Tbilisi

Pos	Team	Pld	W	D	L	GF	GA	GD	Pts	Qualification
1	Latvia	3	2	0	1	82	79	+3	4	Qualification Phase 2
2	Finland	3	2	0	1	86	80	+6	4	
3	Italy	3	2	0	1	97	95	+2	4	
4	Georgia (H)	3	0	0	3	67	78	−11	0	

(H) Hosts

11 June 2010
15:30

UTC+04

Latvia
24 – 26
Finland

Attendance: 300
Referees: Sivak, Dvorsky (SVK)
Jurdz 5
(11 – 11)
Rönnberg, Viljanen 6
4× (yellow card) 7× (suspension)
Report
2× (yellow card) 6× (suspension)

11 June 2010
18:00

UTC+04

Italy
30 – 25
Georgia

Attendance: 400
Referees: Sitsi, Heinla (EST)
Radovic 7
(10 – 10)
Rusia 8
3× (yellow card) 3× (suspension)
Report
4× (yellow card) 4× (suspension)

12 June 2010
15:00

UTC+04

Finland
34 – 35
Italy

Attendance: 200
Referees: Sivak, Dvorsky (SVK)
Tamminen 13
(18 – 19)
Skatar 11
3× (yellow card) 8× (suspension) 2× (red card)
Report
3× (yellow card) 7× (suspension) 1× (red card)

12 June 2010
17:00

UTC+04

Georgia
21 – 22
Latvia

Attendance: 400
Referees: Sitsi, Heinla (EST)
Datukashvili 8
(11 – 11)
Versakovs 9
3× (yellow card) 5× (suspension)
Report
3× (yellow card) 6× (suspension)

13 June 2010
15:00

UTC+04

Latvia
36 – 32
Italy

Attendance: 100
Referees: Sitsi, Heinla (EST)
Jurdz 6
(19–16)
Skatar, Tumbarello 7
3× (yellow card) 8× (suspension) 1× (red card)
Report
3× (yellow card) 8× (suspension) 2× (red card)

13 June 2010
17:00

UTC+04

Finland
26 – 21
Georgia

Attendance: 400
Referees: Sivak, Dvorsky (SVK)
Rönnberg 8
(12–19)
Mskhvildze 8
2× (yellow card) 11× (suspension) 2× (red card)
Report
3× (yellow card) 8× (suspension) 1× (red card)

=== Group 3 ===
Venue: Centre National Sportif d'Coque, Luxembourg

Pos	Team	Pld	W	D	L	GF	GA	GD	Pts	Qualification
1	Israel	3	3	0	0	100	80	+20	6	Qualification Phase 2
2	Turkey	3	2	0	1	88	86	+2	4	
3	Belgium	3	1	0	2	89	96	−7	2	
4	Luxembourg (H)	3	0	0	3	75	90	−15	0	

(H) Hosts

11 June 2010
12:30

CEST (UTC+02)

Israel
32 – 24
Turkey

Referees: Pavicevic, Vujisic (MNE)
Pomeranz 10
(14 – 14)
Döne, Özbahar 5
3× (yellow card) 4× (suspension)
Report
3× (yellow card) 5× (suspension) 1× (red card)

11 June 2010
14:30

CEST (UTC+02)

Belgium
29 – 25
Luxembourg

Attendance: 500
Referees: Nikolovski, Kolevski (MKD)
Verhoeven 9
(15 – 12)
Decker 10
3× (yellow card) 3× (suspension)
Report
3× (yellow card) 4× (suspension)

12 June 2010
19:30

CEST (UTC+02)

Luxembourg
24 – 29
Israel

Attendance: 500
Referees: Nikolovski, Kolevski (MKD)
Sarac 7
(13 – 14)
Pomeranz 6
3× (yellow card) 5× (suspension)
Report
3× (yellow card) 7× (suspension)

12 June 2010
21:30

CEST (UTC+02)

Turkey
32 – 28
Belgium

Attendance: 100
Referees: Pavicevic, Vujisic (MNE)
Döne 11
(15–14)
Verhoeven 8
3× (yellow card) 2× (suspension)
Report
3× (yellow card) 6× (suspension)

13 June 2010
18:00

CEST (UTC+02)

Turkey
32 – 26
Luxembourg

Attendance: 200
Referees: Nikolovski, Kolevski (MKD)
Döne 8
(15–10)
Poeckes 8
3× (yellow card) 9× (suspension)
Report
3× (yellow card) 1× (suspension)

13 June 2010
20:00

CEST (UTC+02)

Israel
39 – 32
Belgium

Attendance: 100
Referees: Pavicevic, Vujisic (MNE)
Halifi 16
(21–16)
Mathijs, Querimi, Van Wesemael 5
3× (yellow card) 6× (suspension)
Report
3× (yellow card) 4× (suspension)

== Qualification Phase 2 ==
There were 28 teams participating at this phase. They were drawn into 7 groups of 4 teams with the first 2 in each group qualifying for the 2012 European Men's Handball Championship. The teams participating at this phase were:

- 14 teams qualified from 2010 European Men's Handball Championship: Croatia, Austria, Czech Republic, Denmark, Spain, Germany, Hungary, Iceland, Norway, Poland, Slovenia, Russia, Sweden, Ukraine.
- 7 group winners from the Qualification Round from the 2011 World Men's Handball Championship European qualification: Greece, Lithuania, Netherlands, Portugal, Romania, Switzerland, Slovakia.
- 4 additional teams according to the EHF National Team Ranking list valid for the EHF EURO 2012 Qualification in Serbia: Macedonia, Montenegro, Belarus, Bosnia and Herzegovina.
- 3 winners of the Qualification Phase 1: Estonia, Israel, Latvia

=== Group 1 ===
Pos	Team	Pld	W	D	L	GF	GA	GD	Pts	Qualification
1	Hungary	6	6	0	0	171	130	+41	12	Final tournament
2	Macedonia	6	3	1	2	162	155	+7	7	Final tournament
3	Estonia	6	2	0	4	154	177	−23	4	
4	Bosnia and Herzegovina	6	0	1	5	134	159	−25	1	

27 October 2010; 17:15	Macedonia	30 – 25	Estonia	SRC Kale, Skopje; Attendance: 1,500; Referees: Karlubik, Struhar (SVK)
27 October 2010; 17:15	K. Lazarov 7	(16–10)	Pinnonen 7	SRC Kale, Skopje; Attendance: 1,500; Referees: Karlubik, Struhar (SVK)
27 October 2010; 17:15	3× (yellow card) 6× (suspension)	Report	3× (yellow card) 5× (suspension)	SRC Kale, Skopje; Attendance: 1,500; Referees: Karlubik, Struhar (SVK)

28 October 2010; 18:00	Hungary	26 – 17	Bosnia and Herzegovina	Arena Savaria, Szombathely; Attendance: 2,000; Referees: Horacek, Novotny (CZE)
28 October 2010; 18:00	Ilyés, Mocsai 5	(10–9)	Jaškić 6	Arena Savaria, Szombathely; Attendance: 2,000; Referees: Horacek, Novotny (CZE)
28 October 2010; 18:00	3× (yellow card) 2× (suspension)	Report	3× (yellow card) 2× (suspension)	Arena Savaria, Szombathely; Attendance: 2,000; Referees: Horacek, Novotny (CZE)

31 October 2010; 17:45	Estonia	19 – 31	Hungary	Mesikäpa Hall, Põlva; Attendance: 800; Referees: Kouz, Zhoba (UKR)
31 October 2010; 17:45	Järve, Patrail 4	(9–14)	Harsányi 8	Mesikäpa Hall, Põlva; Attendance: 800; Referees: Kouz, Zhoba (UKR)
31 October 2010; 17:45	3× (yellow card) 4× (suspension)	Report	2× (yellow card) 7× (suspension)	Mesikäpa Hall, Põlva; Attendance: 800; Referees: Kouz, Zhoba (UKR)

31 October 2010; 20:00	Bosnia and Herzegovina	28 – 28	Macedonia	Dvorana Mirza Delibašić, Sarajevo; Attendance: 3,000; Referees: Dinu, Din (ROU)
31 October 2010; 20:00	Doborac, Terzic 6	(15–13)	Aluševski 9	Dvorana Mirza Delibašić, Sarajevo; Attendance: 3,000; Referees: Dinu, Din (ROU)
31 October 2010; 20:00	3× (yellow card) 2× (suspension) 1× (red card)	Report	3× (yellow card) 3× (suspension)	Dvorana Mirza Delibašić, Sarajevo; Attendance: 3,000; Referees: Dinu, Din (ROU)

9 March 2011; 17:15	Macedonia	22 – 29	Hungary	Boris Trajkovski Sports Center, Skopje; Attendance: 4,500; Referees: Buy, Pichon (FRA)
9 March 2011; 17:15	F. Lazarov 7	(6–16)	G. Iváncsik, T. Iváncsik 4	Boris Trajkovski Sports Center, Skopje; Attendance: 4,500; Referees: Buy, Pichon (FRA)
9 March 2011; 17:15	3× (yellow card) 4× (suspension)	Report	3× (yellow card) 4× (suspension)	Boris Trajkovski Sports Center, Skopje; Attendance: 4,500; Referees: Buy, Pichon (FRA)

9 March 2011; 17:45	Estonia	35 – 30	Bosnia and Herzegovina	Mesikäpa Hall, Põlva; Attendance: 800; Referees: Togstad, Kristiansen (NOR)
9 March 2011; 17:45	Patrail 10	(16–13)	Djukić, Harmandić 5	Mesikäpa Hall, Põlva; Attendance: 800; Referees: Togstad, Kristiansen (NOR)
9 March 2011; 17:45	3× (yellow card) 5× (suspension)	Report	2× (yellow card) 3× (suspension) 1× (red card)	Mesikäpa Hall, Põlva; Attendance: 800; Referees: Togstad, Kristiansen (NOR)

12 March 2011; 17:15	Bosnia and Herzegovina	21 – 23	Estonia	Sport Centre Mladost, Visoko; Attendance: 1,500; Referees: Stenrand, Birch (DEN)
12 March 2011; 17:15	Prce 5	(9–11)	Patrail 7	Sport Centre Mladost, Visoko; Attendance: 1,500; Referees: Stenrand, Birch (DEN)
12 March 2011; 17:15	2× (yellow card) 5× (suspension)	Report	3× (yellow card) 4× (suspension)	Sport Centre Mladost, Visoko; Attendance: 1,500; Referees: Stenrand, Birch (DEN)

13 March 2011; 16:45	Hungary	29 – 26	Macedonia	Veszprém Aréna, Veszprém; Attendance: 4,500; Referees: Fleisch, Rieber (GER)
13 March 2011; 16:45	Harsányi, Ilyés 6	(16–13)	F. Lazarov 7	Veszprém Aréna, Veszprém; Attendance: 4,500; Referees: Fleisch, Rieber (GER)
13 March 2011; 16:45	3× (yellow card) 4× (suspension)	Report	3× (yellow card) 3× (suspension)	Veszprém Aréna, Veszprém; Attendance: 4,500; Referees: Fleisch, Rieber (GER)

8 June 2011; 20:00	Estonia	25 – 31	Macedonia	Mesikäpa Hall, Põlva; Attendance: 600; Referees: Pedersen, Mortensen (DEN)
8 June 2011; 20:00	Jaanimaa, Pinnonen 5	(8–14)	K. Lazarov 10	Mesikäpa Hall, Põlva; Attendance: 600; Referees: Pedersen, Mortensen (DEN)
8 June 2011; 20:00	3× (yellow card) 2× (suspension) 1× (red card)	Report	3× (yellow card) 5× (suspension)	Mesikäpa Hall, Põlva; Attendance: 600; Referees: Pedersen, Mortensen (DEN)

8 June 2011; 20:15	Bosnia and Herzegovina	19 – 22	Hungary	Sport Centre Mladost, Visoko; Attendance: 1,500; Referees: Brunovsky, Canda (SVK)
8 June 2011; 20:15	Kelečević 6	(9–11)	Császár 10	Sport Centre Mladost, Visoko; Attendance: 1,500; Referees: Brunovsky, Canda (SVK)
8 June 2011; 20:15	3× (yellow card) 4× (suspension)	Report	2× (yellow card) 4× (suspension)	Sport Centre Mladost, Visoko; Attendance: 1,500; Referees: Brunovsky, Canda (SVK)

12 June 2011; 12:15	Hungary	34 – 27	Estonia	Gyöngyösi Sportcsarnok, Gyöngyös; Attendance: 1,600; Referees: Chaskis, Tsakonas (GRE)
12 June 2011; 12:15	Halász 9	(17–19)	Patrail 9	Gyöngyösi Sportcsarnok, Gyöngyös; Attendance: 1,600; Referees: Chaskis, Tsakonas (GRE)
12 June 2011; 12:15	2× (yellow card) 5× (suspension)	Report	3× (yellow card) 4× (suspension)	Gyöngyösi Sportcsarnok, Gyöngyös; Attendance: 1,600; Referees: Chaskis, Tsakonas (GRE)

12 June 2011; 20:15	Macedonia	25 – 19	Bosnia and Herzegovina	Boris Trajkovski Sports Center, Skopje; Attendance: 9,000; Referees: Bashmak, Frolov (RUS)
12 June 2011; 20:15	K. Lazarov 6	(12–7)	Stojanovic 6	Boris Trajkovski Sports Center, Skopje; Attendance: 9,000; Referees: Bashmak, Frolov (RUS)
12 June 2011; 20:15	2× (yellow card) 3× (suspension)	Report	3× (yellow card) 5× (suspension)	Boris Trajkovski Sports Center, Skopje; Attendance: 9,000; Referees: Bashmak, Frolov (RUS)

=== Group 2 ===
Pos	Team	Pld	W	D	L	GF	GA	GD	Pts	Qualification
1	Croatia	6	6	0	0	168	137	+31	12	Final tournament
2	Spain	6	4	0	2	174	125	+49	8	Final tournament
3	Lithuania	6	2	0	4	129	161	−32	4	
4	Romania	6	0	0	6	138	186	−48	0	

27 October 2010; 20:30	Spain	33 – 17	Lithuania	Pabellon Lalín Arena, Lalín; Attendance: 2,500; Referees: Badura, Ondogrecula (SVK)
27 October 2010; 20:30	Romero 7	(17–5)	Grosas, Svedas 3	Pabellon Lalín Arena, Lalín; Attendance: 2,500; Referees: Badura, Ondogrecula (SVK)
27 October 2010; 20:30	2× (yellow card) 3× (suspension)	Report	3× (yellow card) 4× (suspension)	Pabellon Lalín Arena, Lalín; Attendance: 2,500; Referees: Badura, Ondogrecula (SVK)

28 October 2010; 20:00	Croatia	34 – 22	Romania	Skolska Sportska Dvorana, Karlovac; Attendance: 2,800; Referees: Brunovsky, Canda (SVK)
28 October 2010; 20:00	Kopljar 7	(16–11)	Ghionea 7	Skolska Sportska Dvorana, Karlovac; Attendance: 2,800; Referees: Brunovsky, Canda (SVK)
28 October 2010; 20:00	3× (yellow card) 1× (suspension)	Report	3× (yellow card) 1× (suspension)	Skolska Sportska Dvorana, Karlovac; Attendance: 2,800; Referees: Brunovsky, Canda (SVK)

31 October 2010; 18:00	Lithuania	19 – 21	Croatia	Siemens Arena, Vilnius; Attendance: 1,600; Referees: Abrahamsen, Kristiansen (NOR)
31 October 2010; 18:00	Malasinskas 4	(10–8)	Zrnić 5	Siemens Arena, Vilnius; Attendance: 1,600; Referees: Abrahamsen, Kristiansen (NOR)
31 October 2010; 18:00	2× (yellow card) 4× (suspension)	Report	3× (yellow card) 3× (suspension)	Siemens Arena, Vilnius; Attendance: 1,600; Referees: Abrahamsen, Kristiansen (NOR)

31 October 2010; 18:00	Romania	20 – 35	Spain	Sala Sporturilor Antonio Alexe, Oradea; Attendance: 2,000; Referees: Johanssen, Kliko (SWE)
31 October 2010; 18:00	Stamate 5	(7–18)	Romero 5	Sala Sporturilor Antonio Alexe, Oradea; Attendance: 2,000; Referees: Johanssen, Kliko (SWE)
31 October 2010; 18:00	3× (yellow card) 3× (suspension)	Report	3× (yellow card) 3× (suspension)	Sala Sporturilor Antonio Alexe, Oradea; Attendance: 2,000; Referees: Johanssen, Kliko (SWE)

10 March 2011; 19:00	Lithuania	24 – 23	Romania	Siemens Arena, Vilnius; Attendance: 2,000; Referees: Kavulic, Skruzny (CZE)
10 March 2011; 19:00	Rackauskas 5	(13–10)	Muresan 6	Siemens Arena, Vilnius; Attendance: 2,000; Referees: Kavulic, Skruzny (CZE)
10 March 2011; 19:00	3× (yellow card) 6× (suspension)	Report	2× (yellow card) 4× (suspension)	Siemens Arena, Vilnius; Attendance: 2,000; Referees: Kavulic, Skruzny (CZE)

10 March 2011; 20:30	Spain	24 – 26	Croatia	Quijote Arena, Ciudad Real; Attendance: 5,100; Referees: Methe, Methe (GER)
10 March 2011; 20:30	Garcia Parrondo, Guardiola Villaplana 5	(9–8)	Duvnjak 6	Quijote Arena, Ciudad Real; Attendance: 5,100; Referees: Methe, Methe (GER)
10 March 2011; 20:30	3× (yellow card) 1× (suspension)	Report	3× (yellow card) 1× (suspension)	Quijote Arena, Ciudad Real; Attendance: 5,100; Referees: Methe, Methe (GER)

13 March 2011; 17:45	Croatia	23 – 21	Spain	Spaladium Arena, Split; Attendance: 12,000; Referees: Horacek, Novotny (CZE)
13 March 2011; 17:45	Vuković 5	(15–12)	Cañellas 4	Spaladium Arena, Split; Attendance: 12,000; Referees: Horacek, Novotny (CZE)
13 March 2011; 17:45	3× (yellow card) 2× (suspension)	Report	3× (yellow card) 2× (suspension)	Spaladium Arena, Split; Attendance: 12,000; Referees: Horacek, Novotny (CZE)

13 March 2011; 18:30	Romania	25 – 27	Lithuania	the Sala Sporturilor, Constanţa; Attendance: 1,100; Referees: Buache, Meyer (SUI)
13 March 2011; 18:30	Novanc 6	(11–13)	Cepulis, Strazdas 5	the Sala Sporturilor, Constanţa; Attendance: 1,100; Referees: Buache, Meyer (SUI)
13 March 2011; 18:30	3× (yellow card) 2× (suspension)	Report	3× (yellow card) 2× (suspension)	the Sala Sporturilor, Constanţa; Attendance: 1,100; Referees: Buache, Meyer (SUI)

8 June 2011; 20:00	Romania	25 – 30	Croatia	Polivalent Hall Drobeta, Drobeta-Turnu Severin; Attendance: 1,700; Referees: Zotin, Volodkov (RUS)
8 June 2011; 20:00	Florea 11	(14–14)	Čupić 9	Polivalent Hall Drobeta, Drobeta-Turnu Severin; Attendance: 1,700; Referees: Zotin, Volodkov (RUS)
8 June 2011; 20:00	3× (yellow card) 3× (suspension)	Report	3× (yellow card) 2× (suspension)	Polivalent Hall Drobeta, Drobeta-Turnu Severin; Attendance: 1,700; Referees: Zotin, Volodkov (RUS)

9 June 2011; 19:00	Lithuania	16 – 25	Spain	Siemens Arena, Vilnius; Attendance: 2,000; Referees: Nielsen, Lorentzen (DEN)
9 June 2011; 19:00	Drevinskas 4	(6–11)	Parrondo 5	Siemens Arena, Vilnius; Attendance: 2,000; Referees: Nielsen, Lorentzen (DEN)
9 June 2011; 19:00	3× (yellow card) 7× (suspension) 1× (red card)	Report	2× (yellow card) 3× (suspension)	Siemens Arena, Vilnius; Attendance: 2,000; Referees: Nielsen, Lorentzen (DEN)

12 June 2011; 18:00	Croatia	34 – 26	Lithuania	Žatika Sport Centre, Poreč; Attendance: 2,300; Referees: Erdogan, Özdeniz (TUR)
12 June 2011; 18:00	Čupić 9	Report	Malašinskas 7	Žatika Sport Centre, Poreč; Attendance: 2,300; Referees: Erdogan, Özdeniz (TUR)
12 June 2011; 18:00	3× (yellow card) 3× (suspension)		3× (yellow card)	Žatika Sport Centre, Poreč; Attendance: 2,300; Referees: Erdogan, Özdeniz (TUR)

12 June 2011; 18:00	Spain	36 – 23	Romania	Polideportivo Municipal "Aguas Vivas", Guadalajara; Attendance: 1,700; Referees: Kohout, Novak (CZE)
12 June 2011; 18:00	García 6	(18–11)	Stan 7	Polideportivo Municipal "Aguas Vivas", Guadalajara; Attendance: 1,700; Referees: Kohout, Novak (CZE)
12 June 2011; 18:00	3× (yellow card) 3× (suspension)	Report	3× (yellow card) 4× (suspension)	Polideportivo Municipal "Aguas Vivas", Guadalajara; Attendance: 1,700; Referees: Kohout, Novak (CZE)

=== Group 3 ===
Pos	Team	Pld	W	D	L	GF	GA	GD	Pts	Qualification
1	Poland	6	4	1	1	172	147	+25	9	Final tournament
2	Slovenia	6	4	0	2	194	179	+15	8	Final tournament
3	Portugal	6	2	1	3	164	165	−1	5	
4	Ukraine	6	1	0	5	143	182	−39	2	

27 October 2010; 20:15	Slovenia	34 – 31	Portugal	Zlatorog Arena, Celje; Attendance: 1,200; Referees: Zotin, Volodkov (RUS)
27 October 2010; 20:15	Gajič, Natek 9	(17–14)	Solha 7	Zlatorog Arena, Celje; Attendance: 1,200; Referees: Zotin, Volodkov (RUS)
27 October 2010; 20:15	3× (yellow card) 6× (suspension)	Report	3× (yellow card) 4× (suspension)	Zlatorog Arena, Celje; Attendance: 1,200; Referees: Zotin, Volodkov (RUS)

28 October 2010; 17:00	Poland	23 – 15	Ukraine	Hala Torwar, Warsaw; Attendance: 4,800; Referees: Nikolic, Stojkovic (SRB)
28 October 2010; 17:00	three players 3	(11–7)	Onufryienko, Ostroushko 4	Hala Torwar, Warsaw; Attendance: 4,800; Referees: Nikolic, Stojkovic (SRB)
28 October 2010; 17:00	3× (yellow card) 3× (suspension)	Report	3× (yellow card) 4× (suspension)	Hala Torwar, Warsaw; Attendance: 4,800; Referees: Nikolic, Stojkovic (SRB)

31 October 2010; 17:00	Portugal	27 – 27	Poland	Portimão Arena, Portimão; Attendance: 1,500; Referees: Nielsen, Lorentzen (DEN)
31 October 2010; 17:00	Solha 10	(17–12)	Jurecki 5	Portimão Arena, Portimão; Attendance: 1,500; Referees: Nielsen, Lorentzen (DEN)
31 October 2010; 17:00	2× (yellow card) 3× (suspension)	Report	3× (yellow card) 3× (suspension)	Portimão Arena, Portimão; Attendance: 1,500; Referees: Nielsen, Lorentzen (DEN)

31 October 2010; 17:00	Ukraine	25 – 31	Slovenia	Citysporthall, Zaporizhia; Attendance: 2,000; Referees: Herczeg, Südi (HUN)
31 October 2010; 17:00	Shevelev 6	(15–17)	Gajic 11	Citysporthall, Zaporizhia; Attendance: 2,000; Referees: Herczeg, Südi (HUN)
31 October 2010; 17:00	3× (yellow card) 4× (suspension)	Report	3× (yellow card) 5× (suspension)	Citysporthall, Zaporizhia; Attendance: 2,000; Referees: Herczeg, Südi (HUN)

9 March 2011; 20:15	Slovenia	30 – 28	Poland	Arena Stožice, Ljubljana; Attendance: 12,500; Referees: Gjeding, Hansen (DEN)
9 March 2011; 20:15	Gajič 8	(14–14)	Tłuczyński 6	Arena Stožice, Ljubljana; Attendance: 12,500; Referees: Gjeding, Hansen (DEN)
9 March 2011; 20:15	3× (yellow card) 7× (suspension)	Report	3× (yellow card) 6× (suspension)	Arena Stožice, Ljubljana; Attendance: 12,500; Referees: Gjeding, Hansen (DEN)

9 March 2011; 20:25	Portugal	28 – 16	Ukraine	Moimenta da Beira, Moimenta da Beira; Attendance: 1,200; Referees: Mazeika, Gatelis (LTU)
9 March 2011; 20:25	Pedroso 7	(17–6)	Shevelev 4	Moimenta da Beira, Moimenta da Beira; Attendance: 1,200; Referees: Mazeika, Gatelis (LTU)
9 March 2011; 20:25	3× (yellow card) 4× (suspension)	Report	2× (yellow card) 2× (suspension)	Moimenta da Beira, Moimenta da Beira; Attendance: 1,200; Referees: Mazeika, Gatelis (LTU)

12 March 2011; 14:30	Poland	32 – 27	Slovenia	Centrum Rekreacyjno-Sportowe, Zielona Góra; Attendance: 5,100; Referees: Dentz, Reibel (FRA)
12 March 2011; 14:30	three players 6	(15–14)	Natek 8	Centrum Rekreacyjno-Sportowe, Zielona Góra; Attendance: 5,100; Referees: Dentz, Reibel (FRA)
12 March 2011; 14:30	3× (yellow card) 6× (suspension)	Report	3× (yellow card) 5× (suspension)	Centrum Rekreacyjno-Sportowe, Zielona Góra; Attendance: 5,100; Referees: Dentz, Reibel (FRA)

13 March 2011; 17:00	Ukraine	29 – 25	Portugal	Palace of Sports Yunost, Zaporozhye; Attendance: 2,000; Referees: Mäkinen, Jonsson (SWE)
13 March 2011; 17:00	Krivchikov, Ostroushko 6	(16–15)	Tavares 7	Palace of Sports Yunost, Zaporozhye; Attendance: 2,000; Referees: Mäkinen, Jonsson (SWE)
13 March 2011; 17:00	3× (yellow card) 2× (suspension)	Report	3× (yellow card) 3× (suspension)	Palace of Sports Yunost, Zaporozhye; Attendance: 2,000; Referees: Mäkinen, Jonsson (SWE)

8 June 2011; 18:00	Ukraine	26 – 32	Poland	Palace of Sports Yunost, Zaporozhye; Attendance: 1,200; Referees: Nikolov, Nachevski (MKD)
8 June 2011; 18:00	Burka 7	(13–14)	Jurecki 6	Palace of Sports Yunost, Zaporozhye; Attendance: 1,200; Referees: Nikolov, Nachevski (MKD)
8 June 2011; 18:00	3× (yellow card) 4× (suspension)	Report	3× (yellow card) 2× (suspension)	Palace of Sports Yunost, Zaporozhye; Attendance: 1,200; Referees: Nikolov, Nachevski (MKD)

8 June 2011; 20:25	Portugal	31 – 29	Slovenia	Nave de Espinho, Espinho; Attendance: 2,500; Referees: Geipel, Helbig (GER)
8 June 2011; 20:25	Carneiro 8	(14–13)	Natek 7	Nave de Espinho, Espinho; Attendance: 2,500; Referees: Geipel, Helbig (GER)
8 June 2011; 20:25	3× (yellow card) 3× (suspension)	Report	3× (yellow card) 2× (suspension)	Nave de Espinho, Espinho; Attendance: 2,500; Referees: Geipel, Helbig (GER)

12 June 2011; 14:45	Poland	30 – 22	Portugal	Hala Arena, Poznań; Attendance: 4,500; Referees: Leifsson, Palsson (ISL)
12 June 2011; 14:45	Tłuczyński 8	(14–11)	four players 3	Hala Arena, Poznań; Attendance: 4,500; Referees: Leifsson, Palsson (ISL)
12 June 2011; 14:45	3× (yellow card) 5× (suspension)	Report	3× (yellow card) 4× (suspension)	Hala Arena, Poznań; Attendance: 4,500; Referees: Leifsson, Palsson (ISL)

12 June 2011; 16:30	Slovenia	43 – 32	Ukraine	Arena Stožice, Ljubljana; Attendance: 5,000; Referees: Stolarovs, Licis (LAT)
12 June 2011; 16:30	Gajič 9	(22–16)	Mankovsky, Ostroushko 6	Arena Stožice, Ljubljana; Attendance: 5,000; Referees: Stolarovs, Licis (LAT)
12 June 2011; 16:30	3× (yellow card) 4× (suspension)	Report	2× (yellow card) 7× (suspension)	Arena Stožice, Ljubljana; Attendance: 5,000; Referees: Stolarovs, Licis (LAT)

=== Group 4 ===
Pos	Team	Pld	W	D	L	GF	GA	GD	Pts	Qualification
1	Sweden	6	5	0	1	176	144	+32	10	Final tournament
2	Slovakia	6	5	0	1	184	144	+40	10	Final tournament
3	Montenegro	6	1	0	5	161	196	−35	2	
4	Israel	6	1	0	5	152	189	−37	2	

27 October 2010; 18:00	Slovakia	38 – 24	Israel	MŠK Považská Bystrica, Považská Bystrica; Attendance: 1,400; Referees: Chaskis, Tsakonas (GRE)
27 October 2010; 18:00	Straňovský 7	(20–14)	Avraham 9	MŠK Považská Bystrica, Považská Bystrica; Attendance: 1,400; Referees: Chaskis, Tsakonas (GRE)
27 October 2010; 18:00	3× (yellow card) 4× (suspension)	Report	3× (yellow card) 4× (suspension)	MŠK Považská Bystrica, Považská Bystrica; Attendance: 1,400; Referees: Chaskis, Tsakonas (GRE)

28 October 2010; 19:15	Sweden	30 – 27	Montenegro	Kristianstad Arena, Kristianstad; Attendance: 4,500; Referees: Kohout, Novak (CZE)
28 October 2010; 19:15	Ekberg 8	(15–17)	Mrvaljević 6	Kristianstad Arena, Kristianstad; Attendance: 4,500; Referees: Kohout, Novak (CZE)
28 October 2010; 19:15	3× (yellow card) 4× (suspension)	Report	3× (yellow card) 4× (suspension)	Kristianstad Arena, Kristianstad; Attendance: 4,500; Referees: Kohout, Novak (CZE)

31 October 2010; 18:00	Montenegro	25 – 35	Slovakia	Bar; Attendance: 1,700; Referees: Geipel, Helbig (GER)
31 October 2010; 18:00	Rakcevic, Roganovic 5	(13–19)	Straňovský 9	Bar; Attendance: 1,700; Referees: Geipel, Helbig (GER)
31 October 2010; 18:00	3× (yellow card) 5× (suspension)	Report	3× (yellow card) 5× (suspension)	Bar; Attendance: 1,700; Referees: Geipel, Helbig (GER)

31 October 2010; 19:30	Israel	28 – 32	Sweden	Maccabi House Arena, Rishon LeZion; Attendance: 700; Referees: Chernega, Liudovyk
31 October 2010; 19:30	Pomeranz 8	(13–15)	Petersen 8	Maccabi House Arena, Rishon LeZion; Attendance: 700; Referees: Chernega, Liudovyk
31 October 2010; 19:30	3× (yellow card) 4× (suspension) 1× (red card)	Report	2× (yellow card) 10× (suspension)	Maccabi House Arena, Rishon LeZion; Attendance: 700; Referees: Chernega, Liudovyk

9 March 2011; 17:30	Slovakia	23 – 21	Sweden	Hant Arena, Bratislava; Attendance: 3,300; Referees: Zotin, Volodkov (RUS)
9 March 2011; 17:30	Rabek 7	(13–11)	Doder 5	Hant Arena, Bratislava; Attendance: 3,300; Referees: Zotin, Volodkov (RUS)
9 March 2011; 17:30	3× (yellow card) 4× (suspension)	Report	3× (yellow card) 3× (suspension)	Hant Arena, Bratislava; Attendance: 3,300; Referees: Zotin, Volodkov (RUS)

9 March 2011; 19:00	Israel	29 – 24	Montenegro	Maccabi House Arena, Rishon LeZion; Attendance: 700; Referees: Pavel, State (ROU)
9 March 2011; 19:00	Smoler 9	(15–13)	Ševaljević 5	Maccabi House Arena, Rishon LeZion; Attendance: 700; Referees: Pavel, State (ROU)
9 March 2011; 19:00	3× (yellow card) 6× (suspension)	Report	3× (yellow card) 3× (suspension)	Maccabi House Arena, Rishon LeZion; Attendance: 700; Referees: Pavel, State (ROU)

13 March 2011; 18:00	Montenegro	36 – 27	Israel	Sportski Centar Nikšić, Nikšić; Attendance: 2,500; Referees: Kekes, Kekes (HUN)
13 March 2011; 18:00	Melić 10	(21–12)	Halifi 7	Sportski Centar Nikšić, Nikšić; Attendance: 2,500; Referees: Kekes, Kekes (HUN)
13 March 2011; 18:00	2× (yellow card) 6× (suspension)	Report	3× (yellow card) 5× (suspension)	Sportski Centar Nikšić, Nikšić; Attendance: 2,500; Referees: Kekes, Kekes (HUN)

13 March 2011; 18:10	Sweden	26 – 21	Slovakia	Hovet, Stockholm; Attendance: 5,800; Referees: San Jose, Murcia (ESP)
13 March 2011; 18:10	Ekberg 11	(12–9)	Antl 5	Hovet, Stockholm; Attendance: 5,800; Referees: San Jose, Murcia (ESP)
13 March 2011; 18:10	3× (yellow card) 7× (suspension)	Report	2× (yellow card) 7× (suspension)	Hovet, Stockholm; Attendance: 5,800; Referees: San Jose, Murcia (ESP)

8 June 2011; 20:15	Montenegro	28 – 39	Sweden	Sportski Centar Ada, Pljevlja; Attendance: 1,500; Referees: Hansen, Pettersen (NOR)
8 June 2011; 20:15	Marković 8	(17–19)	Ekberg 11	Sportski Centar Ada, Pljevlja; Attendance: 1,500; Referees: Hansen, Pettersen (NOR)
8 June 2011; 20:15	3× (yellow card) 4× (suspension)	Report	3× (yellow card) 1× (suspension)	Sportski Centar Ada, Pljevlja; Attendance: 1,500; Referees: Hansen, Pettersen (NOR)

9 June 2011; 19:00	Israel	27 – 31	Slovakia	Maccabi House Arena, Rishon LeZion; Attendance: 800; Referees: Nikolovski, Kolevski (MKD)
9 June 2011; 19:00	Pomeranz 8	(12–16)	Straňovský 6	Maccabi House Arena, Rishon LeZion; Attendance: 800; Referees: Nikolovski, Kolevski (MKD)
9 June 2011; 19:00	3× (yellow card) 3× (suspension)	Report	3× (yellow card) 6× (suspension)	Maccabi House Arena, Rishon LeZion; Attendance: 800; Referees: Nikolovski, Kolevski (MKD)

12 June 2011; 16:00	Slovakia	36 – 21	Montenegro	Steel Aréna, Košice; Attendance: 8,100; Referees: Gousko, Repkin (BLR)
12 June 2011; 16:00	Antl 6	(18–10)	Marković 6	Steel Aréna, Košice; Attendance: 8,100; Referees: Gousko, Repkin (BLR)
12 June 2011; 16:00	3× (yellow card) 2× (suspension)	Report	3× (yellow card) 1× (suspension)	Steel Aréna, Košice; Attendance: 8,100; Referees: Gousko, Repkin (BLR)

12 June 2011; 18:15	Sweden	28 – 17	Israel	Telenor Arena Karlskrona; Attendance: 1,700; Referees: Brkic, Jusufhodzic (AUT)
12 June 2011; 18:15	Ekdahl Du Rietz 9	(14–11)	Pomeranz, Smoler 5	Telenor Arena Karlskrona; Attendance: 1,700; Referees: Brkic, Jusufhodzic (AUT)
12 June 2011; 18:15	3× (yellow card) 2× (suspension)	Report	3× (yellow card) 7× (suspension)	Telenor Arena Karlskrona; Attendance: 1,700; Referees: Brkic, Jusufhodzic (AUT)

=== Group 5 ===
Pos	Team	Pld	W	D	L	GF	GA	GD	Pts	Qualification
1	Germany	6	4	1	1	192	150	+42	9	Final tournament
2	Iceland	6	4	0	2	188	178	+10	8	Final tournament
3	Austria	6	3	1	2	165	170	−5	7	
4	Latvia	6	0	0	6	140	187	−47	0	

27 October 2010; 18:15	Germany	26 – 26	Austria	EWS Arena, Göppingen; Attendance: 5,200; Referees: Andersen, Sodal (NOR)
27 October 2010; 18:15	Pfahl 7	(6–14)	Szilágyi 6	EWS Arena, Göppingen; Attendance: 5,200; Referees: Andersen, Sodal (NOR)
27 October 2010; 18:15	3× (yellow card) 2× (suspension)	Report	3× (yellow card) 7× (suspension) 1× (red card)	EWS Arena, Göppingen; Attendance: 5,200; Referees: Andersen, Sodal (NOR)

27 October 2010; 19:40	Iceland	28 – 26	Latvia	Laugardalshöll, Reykjavík; Attendance: 2,300; Referees: Buache, Meyer (SUI)
27 October 2010; 19:40	Stefánsson 6	(14–13)	Vadzītis, Jurdžs 6	Laugardalshöll, Reykjavík; Attendance: 2,300; Referees: Buache, Meyer (SUI)
27 October 2010; 19:40	3× (yellow card) 4× (suspension)	Report	3× (yellow card) 7× (suspension) 1× (red card)	Laugardalshöll, Reykjavík; Attendance: 2,300; Referees: Buache, Meyer (SUI)

30 October 2010; 20:20	Austria	28 – 23	Iceland	Arena Nova, Wiener Neustadt; Attendance: 3,000; Referees: Muro San Jose, Rodriguez Murcia (ESP)
30 October 2010; 20:20	Szilagyi 7	(12–11)	Stefánsson 11	Arena Nova, Wiener Neustadt; Attendance: 3,000; Referees: Muro San Jose, Rodriguez Murcia (ESP)
30 October 2010; 20:20	3× (yellow card) 8× (suspension)	Report	3× (yellow card) 6× (suspension)	Arena Nova, Wiener Neustadt; Attendance: 3,000; Referees: Muro San Jose, Rodriguez Murcia (ESP)

31 October 2010; 14:05	Latvia	18 – 36	Germany	Sports Centre Dobele, Dobele; Attendance: 1,500; Referees: Samuelsen, Hansen (FRO)
31 October 2010; 14:05	Lilienfelds, Straume 5	(8–17)	four players 6	Sports Centre Dobele, Dobele; Attendance: 1,500; Referees: Samuelsen, Hansen (FRO)
31 October 2010; 14:05	2× (yellow card) 3× (suspension)	Report	3× (yellow card) 3× (suspension)	Sports Centre Dobele, Dobele; Attendance: 1,500; Referees: Samuelsen, Hansen (FRO)

9 March 2011; 19:35	Latvia	25 – 28	Austria	Sports Centre Dobele, Dobele; Attendance: 1,000; Referees: Baranowski, Lemanowicz (POL)
9 March 2011; 19:35	Veršakovs 6	(13–14)	Wilczynski 7	Sports Centre Dobele, Dobele; Attendance: 1,000; Referees: Baranowski, Lemanowicz (POL)
9 March 2011; 19:35	3× (yellow card) 5× (suspension)	Report	3× (yellow card) 3× (suspension)	Sports Centre Dobele, Dobele; Attendance: 1,000; Referees: Baranowski, Lemanowicz (POL)

9 March 2011; 19:45	Iceland	36 – 31	Germany	Laugardalshöll, Reykjavík; Attendance: 2,700; Referees: Lopez, Ramirez (ESP)
9 March 2011; 19:45	Sigurðsson 12	(21–14)	Kraus 5	Laugardalshöll, Reykjavík; Attendance: 2,700; Referees: Lopez, Ramirez (ESP)
9 March 2011; 19:45	3× (yellow card) 5× (suspension)	Report	3× (yellow card) 6× (suspension)	Laugardalshöll, Reykjavík; Attendance: 2,700; Referees: Lopez, Ramirez (ESP)

12 March 2011; 20:25	Austria	34 – 24	Latvia	Schwechat; Attendance: 2,400; Referees: Vodopivec, Krasna (SLO)
12 March 2011; 20:25	Weber, Wilczynski 6	(18–10)	Tuminskis 7	Schwechat; Attendance: 2,400; Referees: Vodopivec, Krasna (SLO)
12 March 2011; 20:25	2× (yellow card) 4× (suspension)	Report	3× (yellow card) 4× (suspension)	Schwechat; Attendance: 2,400; Referees: Vodopivec, Krasna (SLO)

13 March 2011; 17:45	Germany	39 – 28	Iceland	Gerry Weber Stadion, Halle; Attendance: 10,500; Referees: Olesen, Pedersen (DEN)
13 March 2011; 17:45	Hens 7	(20–13)	three players 4	Gerry Weber Stadion, Halle; Attendance: 10,500; Referees: Olesen, Pedersen (DEN)
13 March 2011; 17:45	3× (yellow card) 6× (suspension)	Report	3× (yellow card) 7× (suspension)	Gerry Weber Stadion, Halle; Attendance: 10,500; Referees: Olesen, Pedersen (DEN)

8 June 2011; 19:35	Latvia	25 – 29	Iceland	Sports Centre Dobele, Dobele; Attendance: 900; Referees: Leandersson, Lindroos (FIN)
8 June 2011; 19:35	Uščins 6	(11–17)	Sigurðsson 8	Sports Centre Dobele, Dobele; Attendance: 900; Referees: Leandersson, Lindroos (FIN)
8 June 2011; 19:35	3× (yellow card) 1× (suspension)	Report	3× (yellow card) 2× (suspension)	Sports Centre Dobele, Dobele; Attendance: 900; Referees: Leandersson, Lindroos (FIN)

8 June 2011; 20:30	Austria	20 – 28	Germany	OlympiaWorld Innsbruck, Innsbruck; Attendance: 7,500; Referees: Horaček, Novotny (CZE)
8 June 2011; 20:30	Wilczynski 6	(8–15)	Hens 6	OlympiaWorld Innsbruck, Innsbruck; Attendance: 7,500; Referees: Horaček, Novotny (CZE)
8 June 2011; 20:30	3× (yellow card) 6× (suspension)	Report	3× (yellow card) 5× (suspension)	OlympiaWorld Innsbruck, Innsbruck; Attendance: 7,500; Referees: Horaček, Novotny (CZE)

12 June 2011; 15:00	Germany	32 – 22	Latvia	Trier Arena, Trier; Attendance: 4,550; Referees: Pavicevic, Raznatovic (MNE)
12 June 2011; 15:00	Klein, Sprenger 5	(17–11)	three players 4	Trier Arena, Trier; Attendance: 4,550; Referees: Pavicevic, Raznatovic (MNE)
12 June 2011; 15:00	3× (yellow card) 1× (suspension)	Report	3× (yellow card) 3× (suspension)	Trier Arena, Trier; Attendance: 4,550; Referees: Pavicevic, Raznatovic (MNE)

12 June 2011; 16:30	Iceland	44 – 29	Austria	Laugardalshöll, Reykjavík; Referees: Dentz, Reibel (FRA)
12 June 2011; 16:30	Pálmarsson, Sigurðsson 8	(17–10)	Schlinger 8	Laugardalshöll, Reykjavík; Referees: Dentz, Reibel (FRA)
12 June 2011; 16:30	3× (yellow card) 3× (suspension)	Report	3× (yellow card) 1× (suspension)	Laugardalshöll, Reykjavík; Referees: Dentz, Reibel (FRA)

=== Group 6 ===
Pos	Team	Pld	W	D	L	GF	GA	GD	Pts	Qualification
1	Norway	6	5	0	1	184	152	+32	10	Final tournament
2	Czech Republic	6	4	0	2	178	147	+31	8	Final tournament
3	Greece	6	2	1	3	156	172	−16	5	
4	Netherlands	6	0	1	5	155	202	−47	1	

27 October 2010; 19:15	Norway	35 – 30	Netherlands	Haukelandshallen, Bergen; Attendance: 3,700; Referees: Rutkovskis, Dzerve (LAT)
27 October 2010; 19:15	Strand 9	(17–15)	four players 5	Haukelandshallen, Bergen; Attendance: 3,700; Referees: Rutkovskis, Dzerve (LAT)
27 October 2010; 19:15	2× (yellow card) 1× (suspension)	Report	2× (yellow card) 4× (suspension)	Haukelandshallen, Bergen; Attendance: 3,700; Referees: Rutkovskis, Dzerve (LAT)

27 October 2010; 20:10	Czech Republic	32 – 20	Greece	Sportovní hala Novesta, Zlín; Attendance: 1,800; Referees: Stenrand, Birch (DEN)
27 October 2010; 20:10	Jícha 8	(14–8)	Chalkidis, Vaslikais 4	Sportovní hala Novesta, Zlín; Attendance: 1,800; Referees: Stenrand, Birch (DEN)
27 October 2010; 20:10	3× (yellow card) 4× (suspension)	Report	3× (yellow card) 3× (suspension)	Sportovní hala Novesta, Zlín; Attendance: 1,800; Referees: Stenrand, Birch (DEN)

30 October 2010; 19:00	Netherlands	25 – 33	Czech Republic	Topsportcentrum Almere, Almere; Attendance: 1,000; Referees: Schaller, Wutzler (GER)
30 October 2010; 19:00	Konitz, Sluijters 7	(14–18)	Jícha 9	Topsportcentrum Almere, Almere; Attendance: 1,000; Referees: Schaller, Wutzler (GER)
30 October 2010; 19:00	3× (yellow card) 7× (suspension)	Report	2× (yellow card) 4× (suspension)	Topsportcentrum Almere, Almere; Attendance: 1,000; Referees: Schaller, Wutzler (GER)

31 October 2010; 15:00	Greece	25 – 32	Norway	Xanthi Arena, Xanthi; Attendance: 1,200; Referees: Jurinovic, Mrvica (CRO)
31 October 2010; 15:00	Riganas 5	(10–17)	Tvedten 11	Xanthi Arena, Xanthi; Attendance: 1,200; Referees: Jurinovic, Mrvica (CRO)
31 October 2010; 15:00	2× (yellow card) 1× (suspension)	Report	3× (yellow card) 2× (suspension)	Xanthi Arena, Xanthi; Attendance: 1,200; Referees: Jurinovic, Mrvica (CRO)

9 March 2011; 17:00	Czech Republic	29 – 26	Norway	Sportovní hala Novesta, Zlín; Attendance: 1,900; Referees: Nikolov, Nachevski (MKD)
9 March 2011; 17:00	Jícha 12	(11–13)	Rambo, Tvedten 6	Sportovní hala Novesta, Zlín; Attendance: 1,900; Referees: Nikolov, Nachevski (MKD)
9 March 2011; 17:00	3× (yellow card) 5× (suspension)	Report	3× (yellow card) 2× (suspension)	Sportovní hala Novesta, Zlín; Attendance: 1,900; Referees: Nikolov, Nachevski (MKD)

9 March 2011; 19:00	Greece	30 – 23	Netherlands	DAK Kladisou Chanion, Chania; Attendance: 2,000; Referees: Andorka, Hucker (HUN)
9 March 2011; 19:00	Chalkidis 7	(14–12)	Lochtenbergh 8	DAK Kladisou Chanion, Chania; Attendance: 2,000; Referees: Andorka, Hucker (HUN)
9 March 2011; 19:00	3× (yellow card) 3× (suspension)	Report	3× (yellow card) 3× (suspension)	DAK Kladisou Chanion, Chania; Attendance: 2,000; Referees: Andorka, Hucker (HUN)

12 March 2011; 19:00	Netherlands	30 – 30	Greece	Topsportcentrum Rotterdam, Rotterdam; Attendance: 1,100; Referees: Cîrligeanu, Bejinariu (ROU)
12 March 2011; 19:00	Leenders 7	(15–15)	Chalkidis 10	Topsportcentrum Rotterdam, Rotterdam; Attendance: 1,100; Referees: Cîrligeanu, Bejinariu (ROU)
12 March 2011; 19:00	3× (yellow card) 2× (suspension)	Report	2× (yellow card) 5× (suspension)	Topsportcentrum Rotterdam, Rotterdam; Attendance: 1,100; Referees: Cîrligeanu, Bejinariu (ROU)

13 March 2011; 19:10	Norway	24 – 22	Czech Republic	Stavanger Idrettshall, Stavanger; Attendance: 5,200; Referees: Krstic, Ljubic (SLO)
13 March 2011; 19:10	Hansen 8	(15–13)	Mráz, Sklenák 4	Stavanger Idrettshall, Stavanger; Attendance: 5,200; Referees: Krstic, Ljubic (SLO)
13 March 2011; 19:10	3× (yellow card) 2× (suspension)	Report	3× (yellow card) 2× (suspension)	Stavanger Idrettshall, Stavanger; Attendance: 5,200; Referees: Krstic, Ljubic (SLO)

8 June 2011; 18:30	Greece	26 – 24	Czech Republic	Alexandreio Melathron, Thessaloniki; Attendance: 700; Referees: Nikolic, Stojkovic (SRB)
8 June 2011; 18:30	Papadopoulos 6	(11–10)	Jícha 9	Alexandreio Melathron, Thessaloniki; Attendance: 700; Referees: Nikolic, Stojkovic (SRB)
8 June 2011; 18:30	3× (yellow card) 3× (suspension)	Report	3× (yellow card) 3× (suspension)	Alexandreio Melathron, Thessaloniki; Attendance: 700; Referees: Nikolic, Stojkovic (SRB)

8 June 2011; 19:30	Netherlands	21 – 36	Norway	Sportcentrum Glanerbrook, Geleen; Attendance: 1,000; Referees: Samuelsen, Hansen (FRO)
8 June 2011; 19:30	Leenders, Schmetz 4	(10–19)	Rambo 9	Sportcentrum Glanerbrook, Geleen; Attendance: 1,000; Referees: Samuelsen, Hansen (FRO)
8 June 2011; 19:30	3× (yellow card) 4× (suspension)	Report	2× (yellow card) 2× (suspension)	Sportcentrum Glanerbrook, Geleen; Attendance: 1,000; Referees: Samuelsen, Hansen (FRO)

11 June 2011; 15:00	Czech Republic	38 – 26	Netherlands	Aréna Sparta Podvinný Mlýn, Prague; Attendance: 1,200; Referees: Yudchyts, Kot (BLR)
11 June 2011; 15:00	Horák 6	(22–13)	Bult 5	Aréna Sparta Podvinný Mlýn, Prague; Attendance: 1,200; Referees: Yudchyts, Kot (BLR)
11 June 2011; 15:00	3× (yellow card) 2× (suspension)	Report	3× (yellow card) 3× (suspension)	Aréna Sparta Podvinný Mlýn, Prague; Attendance: 1,200; Referees: Yudchyts, Kot (BLR)

11 June 2011; 16:15	Norway	31 – 25	Greece	Trondheim Spektrum, Trondheim; Attendance: 1,700; Referees: Eliasson, Gudjonsson (ISL)
11 June 2011; 16:15	Lindboe 9	(17–12)	Bakaoukas 7	Trondheim Spektrum, Trondheim; Attendance: 1,700; Referees: Eliasson, Gudjonsson (ISL)
11 June 2011; 16:15	2× (yellow card) 4× (suspension)	Report	3× (yellow card) 3× (suspension)	Trondheim Spektrum, Trondheim; Attendance: 1,700; Referees: Eliasson, Gudjonsson (ISL)

=== Group 7 ===
Pos	Team	Pld	W	D	L	GF	GA	GD	Pts	Qualification
1	Denmark	6	5	0	1	207	176	+31	10	Final tournament
2	Russia	6	5	0	1	202	185	+17	10	Final tournament
3	Belarus	6	2	0	4	181	203	−22	4	
4	Switzerland	6	0	0	6	172	198	−26	0	

27 October 2010; 19:00	Russia	36 – 34	Switzerland	Sport Hall "Olimpiyskiy" Chekhov, Chekhov; Attendance: 1,500; Referees: Baranowski, Lemanowicz (POL)
27 October 2010; 19:00	Igropulo 10	(15–14)	Liniger 12	Sport Hall "Olimpiyskiy" Chekhov, Chekhov; Attendance: 1,500; Referees: Baranowski, Lemanowicz (POL)
27 October 2010; 19:00	3× (yellow card) 3× (suspension)	Report	3× (yellow card) 7× (suspension)	Sport Hall "Olimpiyskiy" Chekhov, Chekhov; Attendance: 1,500; Referees: Baranowski, Lemanowicz (POL)

27 October 2010; 20:15	Denmark	41 – 33	Belarus	Gigantium, Aalborg; Attendance: 4,100; Referees: Cvetko, Kavalar (SLO)
27 October 2010; 20:15	Hansen 10	(20–13)	Pukhouski 9	Gigantium, Aalborg; Attendance: 4,100; Referees: Cvetko, Kavalar (SLO)
27 October 2010; 20:15	3× (yellow card) 3× (suspension)	Report	3× (yellow card) 3× (suspension)	Gigantium, Aalborg; Attendance: 4,100; Referees: Cvetko, Kavalar (SLO)

31 October 2010; 14:00	Switzerland	25 – 36	Denmark	Eulachhalle, Winterthur; Attendance: 2,000; Referees: Raluy Lopez, Sabroso Ramirez (ESP)
31 October 2010; 14:00	Schmid 6	(14–19)	four players 5	Eulachhalle, Winterthur; Attendance: 2,000; Referees: Raluy Lopez, Sabroso Ramirez (ESP)
31 October 2010; 14:00	3× (yellow card) 4× (suspension)	Report	3× (yellow card) 3× (suspension)	Eulachhalle, Winterthur; Attendance: 2,000; Referees: Raluy Lopez, Sabroso Ramirez (ESP)

31 October 2010; 15:00	Belarus	32 – 39	Russia	Sportshall Victoria, Brest; Attendance: 3,500; Referees: Dobrovits, Tajok (HUN)
31 October 2010; 15:00	Baranau, Rutenka 7	(18–9)	Igropulo, Ivanov 6	Sportshall Victoria, Brest; Attendance: 3,500; Referees: Dobrovits, Tajok (HUN)
31 October 2010; 15:00	3× (yellow card) 2× (suspension)	Report	3× (yellow card) 7× (suspension)	Sportshall Victoria, Brest; Attendance: 3,500; Referees: Dobrovits, Tajok (HUN)

9 March 2011; 19:00	Russia	31 – 27	Denmark	Sport Hall "Olimpiyskiy", Chekhov; Attendance: 2,500; Referees: Nikolic, Stojkovic (SRB)
9 March 2011; 19:00	Igropulo 11	(16–13)	Hansen 5	Sport Hall "Olimpiyskiy", Chekhov; Attendance: 2,500; Referees: Nikolic, Stojkovic (SRB)
9 March 2011; 19:00	3× (yellow card) 3× (suspension)	Report	3× (yellow card) 2× (suspension)	Sport Hall "Olimpiyskiy", Chekhov; Attendance: 2,500; Referees: Nikolic, Stojkovic (SRB)

9 March 2011; 20:00	Switzerland	31 – 34	Belarus	Stäfa; Attendance: 1,250; Referees: Eliasson, Gudjonsson (ISL)
9 March 2011; 20:00	Liniger 8	(16–16)	Pukhouski 8	Stäfa; Attendance: 1,250; Referees: Eliasson, Gudjonsson (ISL)
9 March 2011; 20:00	3× (yellow card) 6× (suspension)	Report	3× (yellow card) 7× (suspension)	Stäfa; Attendance: 1,250; Referees: Eliasson, Gudjonsson (ISL)

12 March 2011; 20:15	Denmark	36 – 29	Russia	Forum, Horsens; Attendance: 3,300; Referees: Kohout, Novak (CZE)
12 March 2011; 20:15	Hansen 14	(18–14)	Starykh 5	Forum, Horsens; Attendance: 3,300; Referees: Kohout, Novak (CZE)
12 March 2011; 20:15	3× (yellow card) 4× (suspension)	Report	2× (yellow card) 5× (suspension)	Forum, Horsens; Attendance: 3,300; Referees: Kohout, Novak (CZE)

13 March 2011; 15:00	Belarus	26 – 24	Switzerland	Palace of Sport, Minsk; Attendance: 3,300; Referees: Abrahamsen, Kristiansen (NOR)
13 March 2011; 15:00	Rutenka 9	(12–14)	Goepfert, Kurth 5	Palace of Sport, Minsk; Attendance: 3,300; Referees: Abrahamsen, Kristiansen (NOR)
13 March 2011; 15:00	3× (yellow card) 5× (suspension)	Report	3× (yellow card) 6× (suspension)	Palace of Sport, Minsk; Attendance: 3,300; Referees: Abrahamsen, Kristiansen (NOR)

8 June 2011; 20:00	Switzerland	29 – 32	Russia	Schachenhalle, Aarau; Attendance: 1,600; Referees: Jurinovic, Mrvica (CRO)
8 June 2011; 20:00	Graubner 10	(16–16)	Igropulo 9	Schachenhalle, Aarau; Attendance: 1,600; Referees: Jurinovic, Mrvica (CRO)
8 June 2011; 20:00	3× (yellow card) 2× (suspension)	Report	3× (yellow card) 3× (suspension)	Schachenhalle, Aarau; Attendance: 1,600; Referees: Jurinovic, Mrvica (CRO)

8 June 2011; 21:15	Belarus	29 – 33	Denmark	Palace of Sport, Minsk; Attendance: 9,300; Referees: Badura, Ondogrecula (SVK)
8 June 2011; 21:15	Brouka, Rutenka 6	(14–13)	Nøddesbo 7	Palace of Sport, Minsk; Attendance: 9,300; Referees: Badura, Ondogrecula (SVK)
8 June 2011; 21:15	2× (yellow card) 2× (suspension)	Report	3× (yellow card) 3× (suspension)	Palace of Sport, Minsk; Attendance: 9,300; Referees: Badura, Ondogrecula (SVK)

12 June 2011; 16:50	Denmark	34 – 29	Switzerland	Ballerup Super Arena, Ballerup; Attendance: 5,700; Referees: Cacador, Nicolau (POR)
12 June 2011; 16:50	Nøddesbo 7	(20–12)	Goepfert, Schmid 6	Ballerup Super Arena, Ballerup; Attendance: 5,700; Referees: Cacador, Nicolau (POR)
12 June 2011; 16:50	1× (yellow card) 3× (suspension)	Report	2× (yellow card) 1× (suspension)	Ballerup Super Arena, Ballerup; Attendance: 5,700; Referees: Cacador, Nicolau (POR)

12 June 2011; 17:00	Russia	35 – 27	Belarus	Sport Hall "Olimpiyskiy" Chekhov, Chekhov; Attendance: 1,500; Referees: Krstic, Ljubic (SLO)
12 June 2011; 17:00	Igropulo 9	(20–14)	Rutenka 8	Sport Hall "Olimpiyskiy" Chekhov, Chekhov; Attendance: 1,500; Referees: Krstic, Ljubic (SLO)
12 June 2011; 17:00	3× (yellow card) 2× (suspension)	Report	3× (yellow card) 2× (suspension)	Sport Hall "Olimpiyskiy" Chekhov, Chekhov; Attendance: 1,500; Referees: Krstic, Ljubic (SLO)
