= 2012 European Men's Handball Championship =

2012 edition of the European Men's Handball Championship

2012 EHF European Men's Handball Championship
Европско првенство у рукомету 2012
- EHF Euro 2012 official logo

Tournament details
- Host country: Serbia
- Venues: 5 (in 4 host cities)
- Dates: 15–29 January 2012
- Teams: 16 (from 1 confederation)

Final positions
- Champions: Denmark (2nd title)
- Runners-up: Serbia
- Third place: Croatia
- Fourth place: Spain

Tournament statistics
- Matches played: 47
- Goals scored: 2,508 (53.36 per match)
- Attendance: 302,688 (6,440 per match)
- Top scorer: Kiril Lazarov (MKD) (61 goals)

Awards
- Best player: Momir Ilić (SRB)

Countries that qualified for the championship

The 2012 EHF European Men's Handball Championship was the tenth edition of the men's continental handball tournament, which was held in Serbia between 15 and 29 January 2012. Sixteen teams qualified for the event, including host nation Serbia, defending champion France and fourteen national teams through the qualifying tournament. The teams were split into four groups of 4, with the top 3 teams of each group advancing to the main round, carrying the points won against other qualified opponents. Going to the main round with no points, Denmark ended up winning the championship after defeating Serbia in the final with a scoreline of 21–19.

Denmark won the title after defeating the hosts Serbia in the final. Croatia captured the bronze medal, after defeating Spain . Defending champions France finished 11th.

The championship was somewhat overshadowed by incidents that occurred during the final week of the event. On 26–27 January, in violent attacks, cars were damaged or set on fire, and several Croatian supporters were injured. In the semifinal match between Serbia and Croatia, Žarko Šešum, the back player of the Serbian team had his eye severely injured after a bottle intended for Croatian player Ivano Balić and coach Slavko Goluža was thrown at him.

== Bidding process ==
The bids were as follows:

- France
- Germany
- Serbia

Serbia was awarded the championship on the EHF Congress in Vienna 27 September 2008, narrowly defeating the French bid by three votes. Serbia would host the tournament in the cities of Belgrade, Niš, Novi Sad and Vršac.

Voting results
Country
Country	Votes
Serbia	26
France	23
Germany	-
Total	49

== Qualification ==
The 2012 Championship was the second for which the new qualification system was used.

=== Qualified teams ===
Country	Qualified as	Date qualification was secured	Previous appearances in tournament^{1}
Serbia	Host	27 September 2008	1 ( 2010)
France	Defending Champion	31 January 2010	9 (1994, 1996, 1998, 2000, 2002, 2004, **2006**, 2008, **2010**)
Hungary	Group 1 winner	13 March 2011	7 (1994, 1996, 1998, 2004, 2006, 2008, 2010)
Croatia	Group 2 winner	13 March 2011	9 (1994, 1996, 1998, 2000, 2002, 2004, 2006, 2008, 2010)
Sweden	Group 4 winner	8 June 2011	8 (**1994**, 1996, **1998**, **2000**, **2002**, 2004, 2008, 2010)
Denmark	Group 7 winner	8 June 2011	8 (1994, 1996, 2000, 2002, 2004, 2006, **2008**, 2010)
Russia	Group 7 runner-up	8 June 2011	9 (1994, **1996**, 1998, 2000, 2002, 2004, 2006, 2008, 2010)
Norway	Group 6 winner	8 June 2011	4 (2000, 2006, 2008, 2010)
Germany	Group 5 winner	8 June 2011	9 (1994, 1996, 1998, 2000, 2002, **2004**, 2006, 2008, 2010)
Slovakia	Group 4 runner-up	9 June 2011	2 (2006, 2008)
Spain	Group 2 runner-up	9 June 2011	9 (1994, 1996, 1998, 2000, 2002, 2004, 2006, 2008, 2010)
Czech Republic	Group 6 runner-up	11 June 2011	6 (1996, 1998, 2002, 2004, 2008, 2010)
Macedonia	Group 1 runner-up	12 June 2011	1 (1998)
Poland	Group 3 winner	12 June 2011	5 (2002, 2004, 2006, 2008, 2010)
Slovenia	Group 3 runner-up	12 June 2011	8 (1994, 1996, 2000, 2002, 2004, 2006, 2008, 2010)
Iceland	Group 5 runner-up	12 June 2011	6 (2000, 2002, 2004, 2006, 2008, 2010)

^{1} Bold indicates champion for that year

== Venues ==
Preliminary round
Belgrade	Novi Sad	Vršac	Niš
Pionir Hall; Capacity: 8,150	SPENS; Capacity: 11,500	Millennium Center; Capacity: 5,000	Čair Sports Center; Capacity: 5,000
Knockout stage		2012 European Men's Handball Championship is located in Serbia	
Belgrade		2012 European Men's Handball Championship is located in Serbia	
Belgrade Arena; Capacity: 20,000		2012 European Men's Handball Championship is located in Serbia	

- Source: Serbian Handball Federation: Euro 2010

=== Audience ===
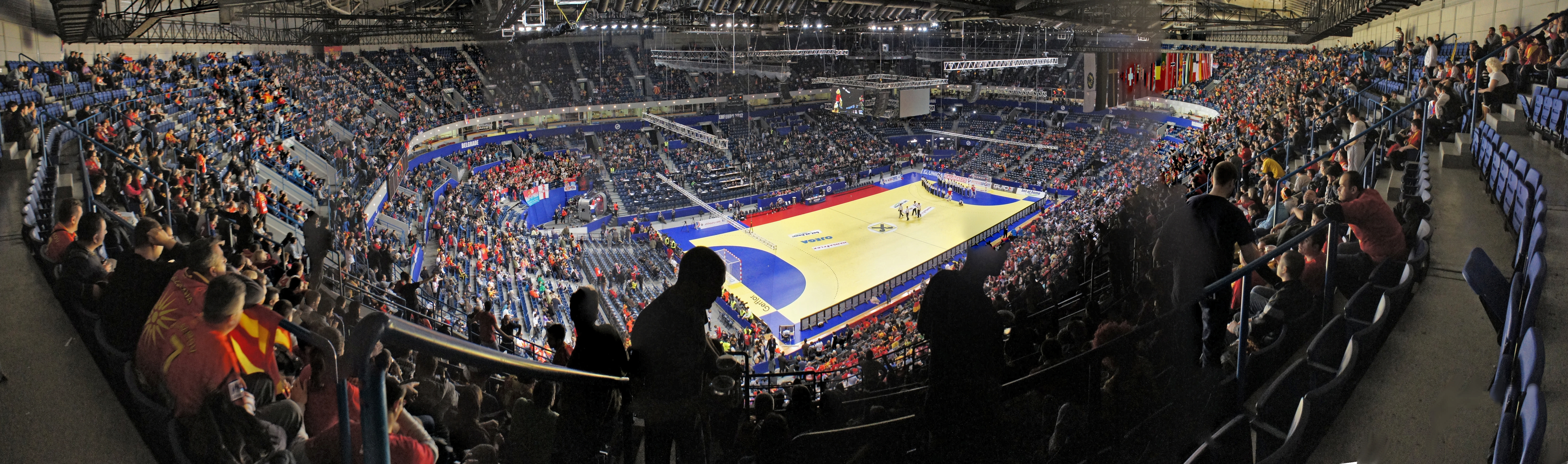
Belgrade Arena.
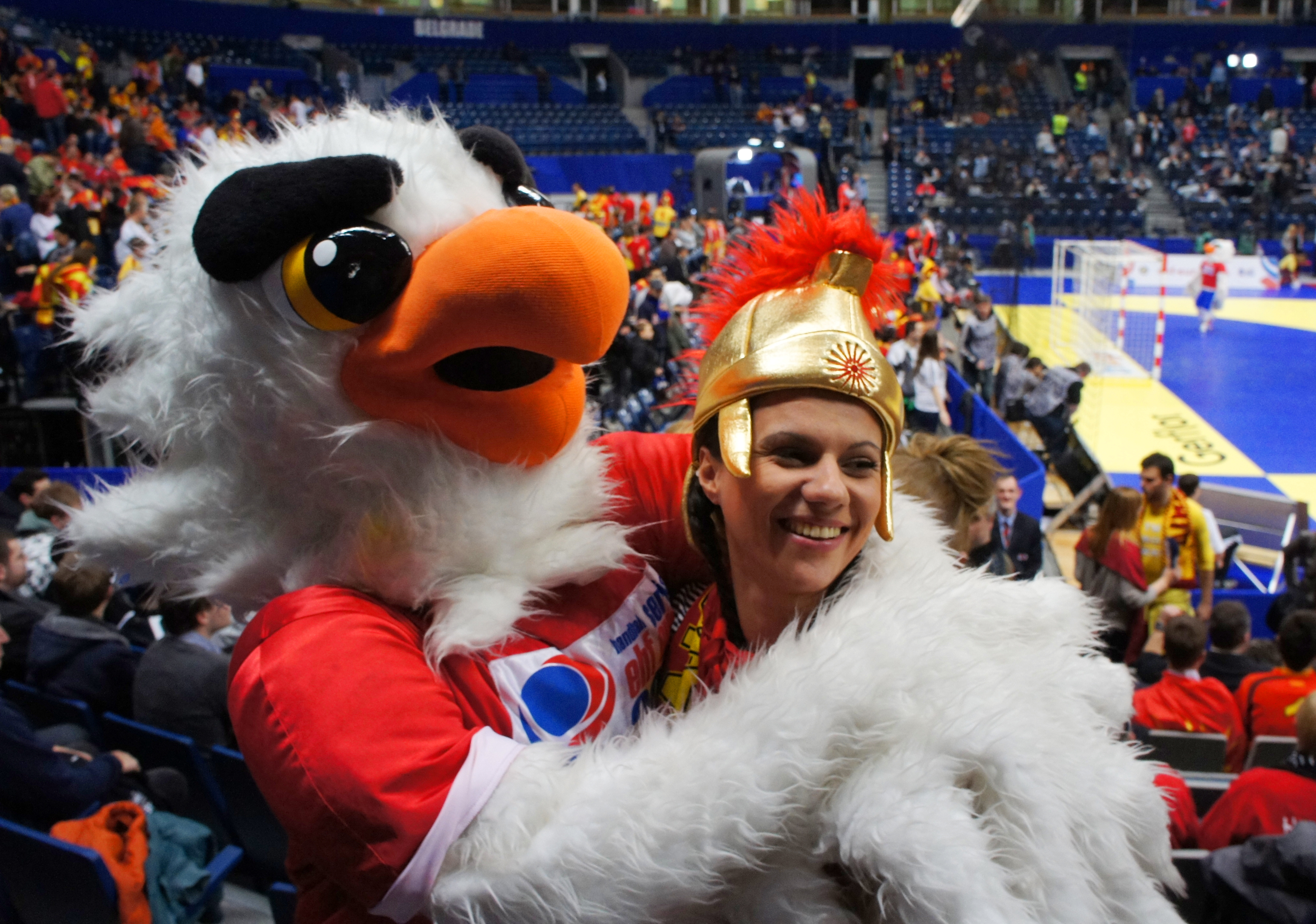
Маscot Tasa (eagle) with Macedonian fan in Belgrade Arena

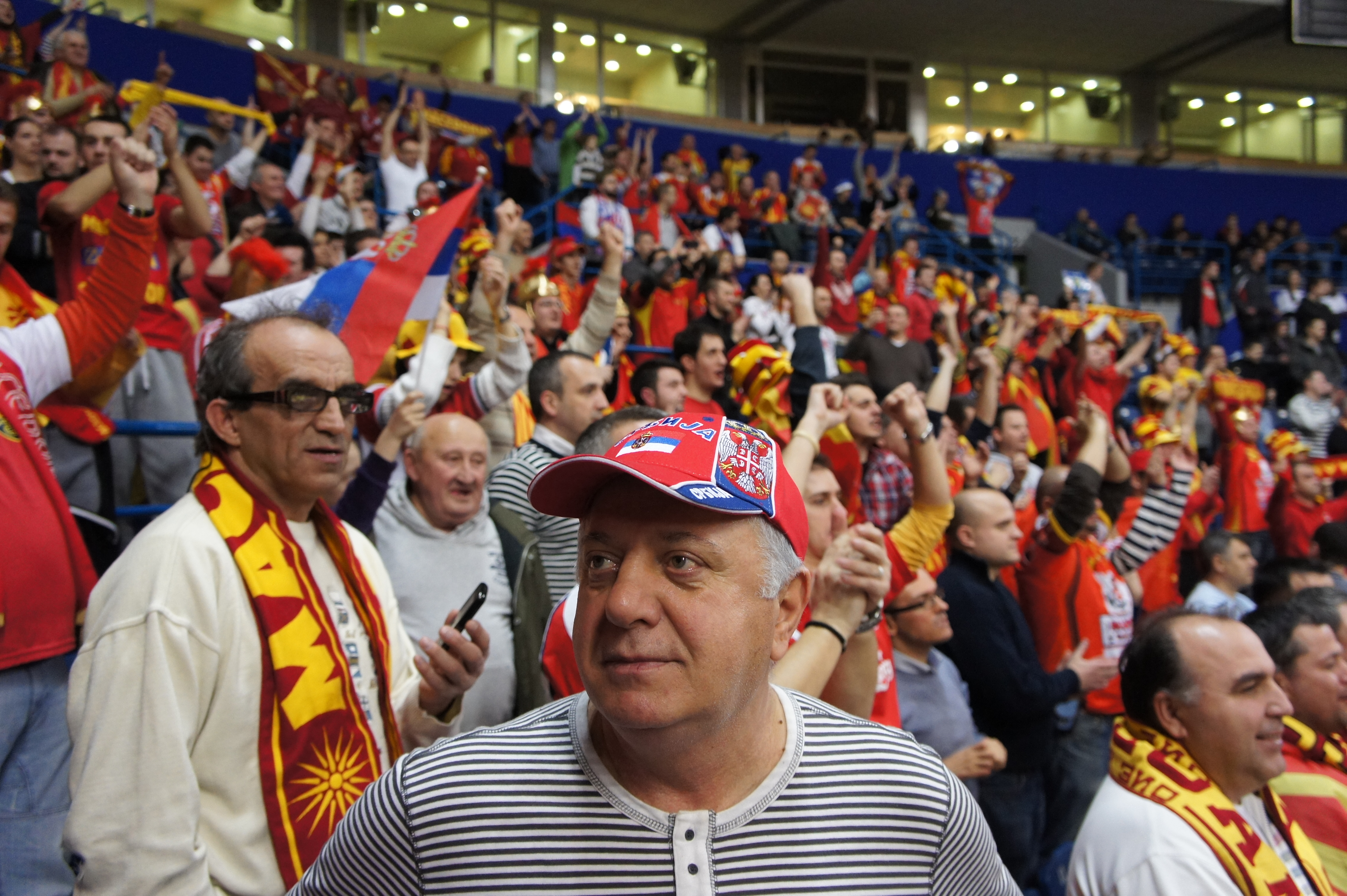
Serbian and Macedonian fans in Belgrade Arena

Serbian and Macedonian fans in Belgrade Arena, Serbia vs Germany

Macedonian fans in Belgrade Arena.

== Referees ==
On 12 September 2011, 12 couples were announced in Vienna.

Country	Referees
Czech Republic	Václav Horáček; Jiří Novotný
Denmark	Per Olesen; Lars Ejby Pedersen
France	Nordine Lazaar; Laurent Reveret
Germany	Lars Geipel; Marcus Helbig
Iceland	Hlynur Leifsson; Anton Pálsson
Macedonia	Slave Nikolov; Gjorgi Nachevski
Norway	Kenneth Abrahamsen; Arne Kristiansen
Romania	Sorin-Laurențiu Dinu; Constantin Din
Russia	Yevgeniy Zotin; Nikolay Volodkov
Serbia	Nenad Nikolić; Dušan Stojković
Slovenia	Nenad Krstić; Peter Ljubič
Spain	Óscar Raluy; Ángel Sabroso

== List of broadcasters ==
Country	Broadcaster
Bosnia and Herzegovina	BHRT
Croatia	HRT2
Czech Republic	ČT4
Denmark	TV2
France	Canal+ Sport; Sport+
Germany	Sport1; Das Erste; ZDF
Hungary	MTV; Sport1
Iceland	RÚV
Macedonia	Sitel; Sitel 3
Norway	TV2
Poland	TVP2; TVP Sport; TVP HD
Portugal	Sport TV
Romania	Dolce Sport; TVR2
Russia	Channel One
Serbia	RTS
Slovakia	Dvojka
Slovenia	RTV2
Spain	Teledeporte
Sweden	TV4; Sjuan
Turkey	Sports TV

== Seeding ==
The draw was held on 15 June 2011 in Belgrade at 12:00 local time. The seeding was announced on 13 June 2011.

Pot 1	Pot 2	Pot 3	Pot 4
France; Croatia (assigned to D1); Germany; Poland	Denmark; Norway; Hungary (assigned to C2); Sweden	Serbia (assigned to A3); Iceland; Spain; Czech Republic	Slovenia; Russia; Macedonia (assigned to B4); Slovakia

== Group stage ==
The match schedule was released and confirmed on 18 April 2011. Four teams were selected to play in the four venue cities, Serbia in Belgrade, Macedonia at Niš, Hungary at Novi Sad and Croatia in Vršac. The playing schedule was announced on 1 July.

All times are UTC+1.

Team advanced to the Main Round

=== Group A ===
Venue: Pionir Hall, Belgrade

Team	Pld	W	D	L	GF	GA	GD	Pts
Serbia	3	2	1	0	67	61	+6	5
Poland	3	2	0	1	86	72	+14	4
Denmark	3	1	0	2	78	76	+2	2
Slovakia	3	0	1	2	70	92	−22	1

15 January 2012; 18:15	Poland	18–22	Serbia	Attendance: 8,000; Referees: Raluy, Sabroso (ESP)
15 January 2012; 18:15	Bielecki 4	(7–11)	Vujin, Nikčević 6	Attendance: 8,000; Referees: Raluy, Sabroso (ESP)
15 January 2012; 18:15	3× (yellow card) 2× (suspension)	Report	3× (yellow card) 4× (suspension)	Attendance: 8,000; Referees: Raluy, Sabroso (ESP)

15 January 2012; 20:15	Denmark	30–25	Slovakia	Attendance: 4,000; Referees: Zotin, Volodkov (RUS)
15 January 2012; 20:15	Lindberg 7	(15–12)	Valo 6	Attendance: 4,000; Referees: Zotin, Volodkov (RUS)
15 January 2012; 20:15	3× (yellow card) 4× (suspension)	Report	2× (yellow card) 2× (suspension)	Attendance: 4,000; Referees: Zotin, Volodkov (RUS)

17 January 2012; 18:15	Slovakia	24–41	Poland	Attendance: 3,500; Referees: Krstić, Ljubič (SLO)
17 January 2012; 18:15	Kukučka 5	(13–17)	Tkaczyk 8	Attendance: 3,500; Referees: Krstić, Ljubič (SLO)
17 January 2012; 18:15	3× (yellow card) 5× (suspension) 1× (red card)	Report	3× (yellow card) 3× (suspension)	Attendance: 3,500; Referees: Krstić, Ljubič (SLO)

17 January 2012; 20:15	Serbia	24–22	Denmark	Attendance: 8,100; Referees: Lazaar, Reveret (FRA)
17 January 2012; 20:15	Ilić 8	(10–12)	Christiansen, Hansen 4	Attendance: 8,100; Referees: Lazaar, Reveret (FRA)
17 January 2012; 20:15	3× (yellow card) 2× (suspension)	Report	3× (yellow card) 4× (suspension)	Attendance: 8,100; Referees: Lazaar, Reveret (FRA)

19 January 2012; 18:15	Poland	27–26	Denmark	Attendance: 3,500; Referees: Leifsson, Pálsson (ISL)
19 January 2012; 18:15	Tkaczyk 7	(10–14)	Mogensen 4	Attendance: 3,500; Referees: Leifsson, Pálsson (ISL)
19 January 2012; 18:15	3× (yellow card) 5× (suspension)	Report	3× (yellow card) 5× (suspension)	Attendance: 3,500; Referees: Leifsson, Pálsson (ISL)

19 January 2012; 20:15	Serbia	21–21	Slovakia	Attendance: 4,900; Referees: Zotin, Volodkov (RUS)
19 January 2012; 20:15	Prodanović 5	(13–6)	three players 4	Attendance: 4,900; Referees: Zotin, Volodkov (RUS)
19 January 2012; 20:15	3× (yellow card) 5× (suspension)	Report	3× (yellow card) 3× (suspension)	Attendance: 4,900; Referees: Zotin, Volodkov (RUS)

=== Group B ===
Venue: Čair Sports Center, Niš

Team	Pld	W	D	L	GF	GA	GD	Pts
Germany	3	2	0	1	77	74	+3	4
Macedonia	3	1	1	1	76	71	+5	3
Sweden	3	1	1	1	83	84	−1	3
Czech Republic	3	1	0	2	77	84	−7	2

15 January 2012; 17:20	Germany	24–27	Czech Republic	Attendance: 3,800; Referees: Abrahamsen, Kristiansen (NOR)
15 January 2012; 17:20	Kaufmann 5	(9–14)	Jícha 7	Attendance: 3,800; Referees: Abrahamsen, Kristiansen (NOR)
15 January 2012; 17:20	3× (yellow card) 3× (suspension)	Report	3× (yellow card) 3× (suspension)	Attendance: 3,800; Referees: Abrahamsen, Kristiansen (NOR)

15 January 2012; 19:30	Sweden	26–26	Macedonia	Attendance: 4,000; Referees: Lazaar, Reveret (FRA)
15 January 2012; 19:30	Ekberg 6	(14–13)	Aluševski, Lazarov 7	Attendance: 4,000; Referees: Lazaar, Reveret (FRA)
15 January 2012; 19:30	3× (yellow card) 6× (suspension)	Report	3× (yellow card) 6× (suspension)	Attendance: 4,000; Referees: Lazaar, Reveret (FRA)

17 January 2012; 18:15	Macedonia	23–24	Germany	Attendance: 4,000; Referees: Leifsson, Pálsson (ISL)
17 January 2012; 18:15	Lazarov 7	(12–12)	Kaufmann 6	Attendance: 4,000; Referees: Leifsson, Pálsson (ISL)
17 January 2012; 18:15	3× (yellow card) 4× (suspension)	Report	3× (yellow card) 7× (suspension) 1× (red card)	Attendance: 4,000; Referees: Leifsson, Pálsson (ISL)

17 January 2012; 20:15	Czech Republic	29–33	Sweden	Attendance: 2,050; Referees: Raluy, Sabroso (ESP)
17 January 2012; 20:15	Jícha 7	(17–19)	Ekberg 10	Attendance: 2,050; Referees: Raluy, Sabroso (ESP)
17 January 2012; 20:15	3× (yellow card) 4× (suspension)	Report	4× (yellow card) 6× (suspension)	Attendance: 2,050; Referees: Raluy, Sabroso (ESP)

19 January 2012; 18:15	Germany	29–24	Sweden	Attendance: 2,800; Referees: Krstić, Ljubič (SLO)
19 January 2012; 18:15	Gensheimer 9	(20–15)	Ekdahl du Rietz 8	Attendance: 2,800; Referees: Krstić, Ljubič (SLO)
19 January 2012; 18:15	3× (yellow card) 5× (suspension)	Report	3× (yellow card) 2× (suspension)	Attendance: 2,800; Referees: Krstić, Ljubič (SLO)

19 January 2012; 20:15	Czech Republic	21–27	Macedonia	Attendance: 4,000; Referees: Abrahamsen, Kristiansen (NOR)
19 January 2012; 20:15	Jícha, Horák 5	(12–12)	Lazarov 7	Attendance: 4,000; Referees: Abrahamsen, Kristiansen (NOR)
19 January 2012; 20:15	3× (yellow card) 6× (suspension)	Report	2× (yellow card) 3× (suspension)	Attendance: 4,000; Referees: Abrahamsen, Kristiansen (NOR)

=== Group C ===
Venue: Spens Sports Center, Novi Sad

Team	Pld	W	D	L	GF	GA	GD	Pts
Spain	3	2	1	0	83	77	+6	5
Hungary	3	1	2	0	81	78	+3	4
France	3	1	0	2	77	79	−2	2
Russia	3	0	1	2	82	89	−7	1

16 January 2012; 18:15	France	26–29	Spain	Attendance: 5,000; Referees: Dinu, Din (ROU)
16 January 2012; 18:15	Fernandez 7	(13–15)	three players 4	Attendance: 5,000; Referees: Dinu, Din (ROU)
16 January 2012; 18:15	3× (yellow card) 2× (suspension)	Report	3× (yellow card) 3× (suspension)	Attendance: 5,000; Referees: Dinu, Din (ROU)

16 January 2012; 20:15	Hungary	31–31	Russia	Attendance: 6,000; Referees: Nikolić, Stojković (SRB)
16 January 2012; 20:15	Császár 8	(19–19)	Chipurin 5	Attendance: 6,000; Referees: Nikolić, Stojković (SRB)
16 January 2012; 20:15	3× (yellow card) 6× (suspension)	Report	3× (yellow card) 7× (suspension)	Attendance: 6,000; Referees: Nikolić, Stojković (SRB)

18 January 2012; 18:15	Russia	24–28	France	Attendance: 3,500; Referees: Horáček, Novotný (CZE)
18 January 2012; 18:15	Chipurin 7	(11–16)	Narcisse 6	Attendance: 3,500; Referees: Horáček, Novotný (CZE)
18 January 2012; 18:15	3× (yellow card) 3× (suspension)	Report	3× (yellow card) 1× (suspension)	Attendance: 3,500; Referees: Horáček, Novotný (CZE)

18 January 2012; 20:15	Spain	24–24	Hungary	Attendance: 4,500; Referees: Geipel, Helbig (GER)
18 January 2012; 20:15	Cañellas 6	(11–12)	Császár, Mocsai 7	Attendance: 4,500; Referees: Geipel, Helbig (GER)
18 January 2012; 20:15	3× (yellow card)	Report	4× (yellow card) 5× (suspension) 1× (red card)	Attendance: 4,500; Referees: Geipel, Helbig (GER)

20 January 2012; 18:15	Spain	30–27	Russia	Attendance: 4,000; Referees: Nikolić, Stojković (SRB)
20 January 2012; 18:15	García Parrondo 6	(17–11)	Igropulo 8	Attendance: 4,000; Referees: Nikolić, Stojković (SRB)
20 January 2012; 18:15	3× (yellow card) 3× (suspension)	Report	4× (yellow card) 4× (suspension) 1× (red card)	Attendance: 4,000; Referees: Nikolić, Stojković (SRB)

20 January 2012; 20:15	France	23–26	Hungary	Attendance: 6,000; Referees: Nikolov, Nachevski (MKD)
20 January 2012; 20:15	Barachet 5	(14–12)	Zubai 6	Attendance: 6,000; Referees: Nikolov, Nachevski (MKD)
20 January 2012; 20:15	3× (yellow card) 2× (suspension)	Report	3× (yellow card) 3× (suspension)	Attendance: 6,000; Referees: Nikolov, Nachevski (MKD)

=== Group D ===
Venue: Millennium Centar, Vršac

Team	Pld	W	D	L	GF	GA	GD	Pts
Croatia	3	3	0	0	88	78	+10	6
Slovenia	3	1	0	2	90	91	−1	2
Iceland	3	1	0	2	95	97	−2	2
Norway	3	1	0	2	80	87	−7	2

16 January 2012; 18:10	Norway	28–27	Slovenia	Attendance: 3,000; Referees: Horáček, Novotný (CZE)
16 January 2012; 18:10	three players 6	(14–14)	Zorman, Gajić 5	Attendance: 3,000; Referees: Horáček, Novotný (CZE)
16 January 2012; 18:10	3× (yellow card) 5× (suspension) 1× (red card)	Report	2× (yellow card) 9× (suspension) 2× (red card)	Attendance: 3,000; Referees: Horáček, Novotný (CZE)

16 January 2012; 20:10	Croatia	31–29	Iceland	Attendance: 2,500; Referees: Geipel, Helbig (GER)
16 January 2012; 20:10	Štrlek 8	(14–15)	Sigurðsson 8	Attendance: 2,500; Referees: Geipel, Helbig (GER)
16 January 2012; 20:10	3× (yellow card) 4× (suspension)	Report	3× (yellow card) 4× (suspension)	Attendance: 2,500; Referees: Geipel, Helbig (GER)

18 January 2012; 18:10	Slovenia	29–31	Croatia	Attendance: 3,800; Referees: Nikolov, Nachevski (MKD)
18 January 2012; 18:10	Gajić 8	(12–16)	Čupić 9	Attendance: 3,800; Referees: Nikolov, Nachevski (MKD)
18 January 2012; 18:10	4× (yellow card) 5× (suspension)	Report	3× (yellow card) 4× (suspension)	Attendance: 3,800; Referees: Nikolov, Nachevski (MKD)

18 January 2012; 20:10	Iceland	34–32	Norway	Attendance: 3,000; Referees: Olesen, Pedersen (DEN)
18 January 2012; 20:10	Gunnarsson 9	(18–20)	Mamelund 10	Attendance: 3,000; Referees: Olesen, Pedersen (DEN)
18 January 2012; 20:10	3× (yellow card) 4× (suspension)	Report	3× (yellow card) 4× (suspension)	Attendance: 3,000; Referees: Olesen, Pedersen (DEN)

20 January 2012; 18:10	Iceland	32–34	Slovenia	Attendance: 3,800; Referees: Geipel, Helbig (GER)
20 January 2012; 18:10	Sigurðsson 9	(13–17)	Gajić, Skube 7	Attendance: 3,800; Referees: Geipel, Helbig (GER)
20 January 2012; 18:10	2× (yellow card) 3× (suspension)	Report	3× (yellow card) 5× (suspension)	Attendance: 3,800; Referees: Geipel, Helbig (GER)

20 January 2012; 20:10	Croatia	26–20	Norway	Attendance: 3,000; Referees: Dinu, Din (ROU)
20 January 2012; 20:10	Čupić 6	(13–8)	Mamelund 6	Attendance: 3,000; Referees: Dinu, Din (ROU)
20 January 2012; 20:10	4× (yellow card) 3× (suspension)	Report	3× (yellow card) 7× (suspension)	Attendance: 3,000; Referees: Dinu, Din (ROU)

== Main round ==
Group stage results between teams that qualified for the main round were carried over.

Team advances to the Semifinals
Team plays in the Fifth place game

=== Group I ===
Venue: Belgrade Arena, Belgrade

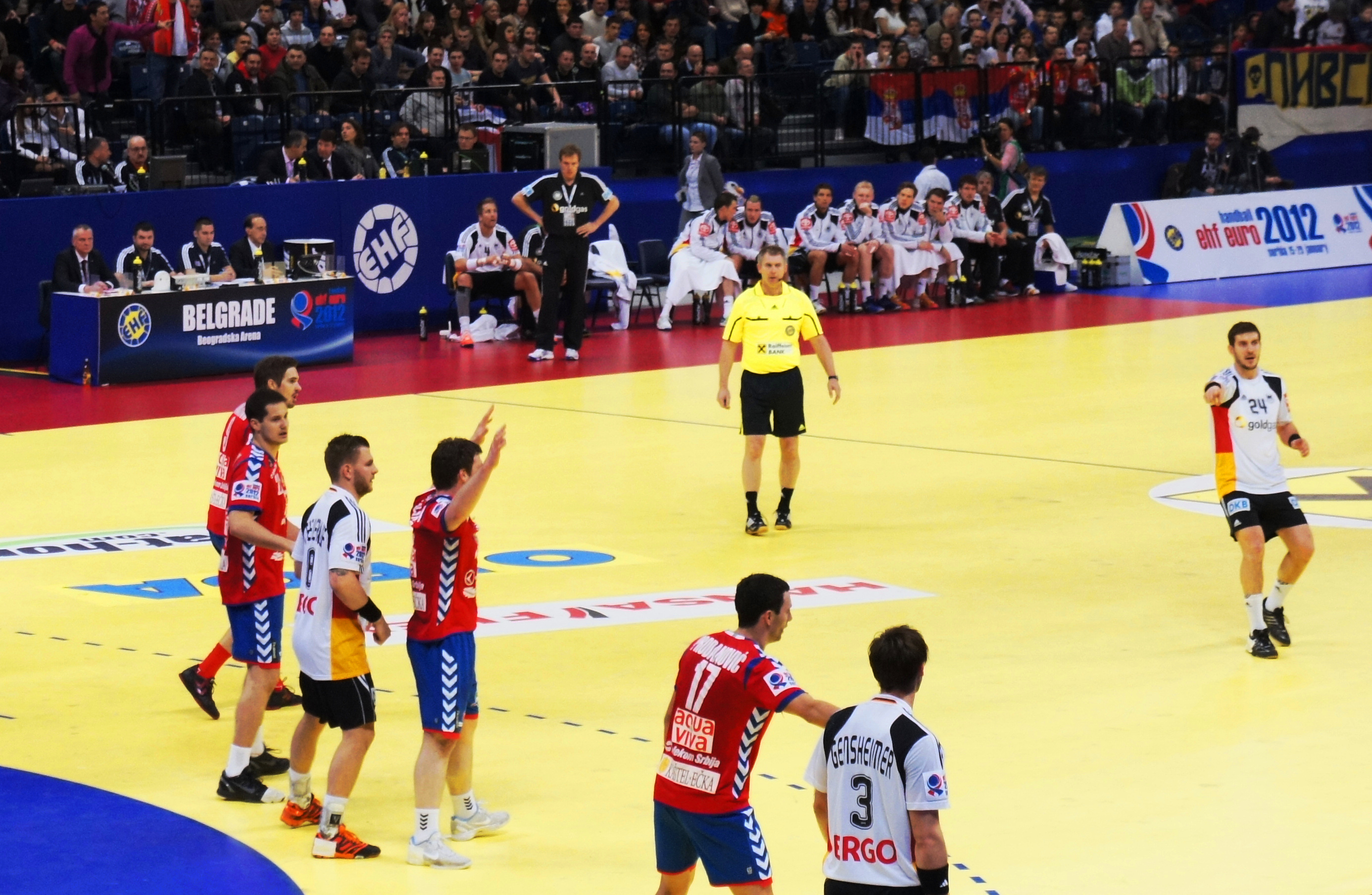
Match Serbia vs Germany.

==== Result ====
Team	Pld	W	D	L	GF	GA	GD	Pts
Serbia	5	3	1	1	110	104	+6	7
Denmark	5	3	0	2	140	133	+7	6
Macedonia	5	2	1	2	130	127	+3	5
Germany	5	2	1	2	132	129	+3	5
Poland	5	2	1	2	132	136	−4	5
Sweden	5	0	2	3	124	139	−15	2

==== Initial standing and matches ====
Team	Pld	W	D	L	GF	GA	GD	Pts
Germany (B)	2	2	0	0	53	47	+6	4
Serbia (A)	2	2	0	0	46	40	+6	4
Poland (A)	2	1	0	1	45	48	−3	2
Macedonia (B)	2	0	1	1	49	50	−1	1
Sweden (B)	2	0	1	1	50	55	−5	1
Denmark (A)	2	0	0	2	48	51	−3	0

(A) and (B) indicates from which group the teams came; in the main round they were playing only against teams from the other group. By three victories and the misfortune of among others Germany, Denmark qualified for the semifinals together with the host, Serbia. Notable results were Denmark's last second win against Macedonia and Poland's turnaround of first-half 9-20 result to win second half by the same numbers to equalize against Sweden.

21 January 2012; 16:15	Poland	29–29	Sweden	Attendance: 6,003; Referees: Lazaar, Reveret (FRA)
21 January 2012; 16:15	Jaszka 8	(9–20)	Ekberg 7	Attendance: 6,003; Referees: Lazaar, Reveret (FRA)
21 January 2012; 16:15	2× (yellow card) 4× (suspension)	Report	3× (yellow card) 3× (suspension)	Attendance: 6,003; Referees: Lazaar, Reveret (FRA)

21 January 2012; 18:15	Denmark	33–32	Macedonia	Attendance: 17,000; Referees: Raluy, Sabroso (ESP)
21 January 2012; 18:15	Hansen 12	(16–19)	Lazarov 13	Attendance: 17,000; Referees: Raluy, Sabroso (ESP)
21 January 2012; 18:15	3× (yellow card) 3× (suspension)	Report	2× (yellow card) 2× (suspension)	Attendance: 17,000; Referees: Raluy, Sabroso (ESP)

21 January 2012; 20:15	Serbia	21–21	Germany	Attendance: 20,500; Referees: Abrahamsen, Kristiansen (NOR)
21 January 2012; 20:15	Ilić 6	(12–7)	Gensheimer 5	Attendance: 20,500; Referees: Abrahamsen, Kristiansen (NOR)
21 January 2012; 20:15	3× (yellow card) 4× (suspension)	Report	3× (yellow card) 4× (suspension)	Attendance: 20,500; Referees: Abrahamsen, Kristiansen (NOR)

23 January 2012; 16:20	Poland	25–27	Macedonia	Attendance: 3,700; Referees: Leifsson, Pálsson (ISL)
23 January 2012; 16:20	Jurecki 5	(12–18)	Lazarov 9	Attendance: 3,700; Referees: Leifsson, Pálsson (ISL)
23 January 2012; 16:20	2× (yellow card) 5× (suspension)	Report	3× (yellow card) 4× (suspension)	Attendance: 3,700; Referees: Leifsson, Pálsson (ISL)

23 January 2012; 18:20	Denmark	28–26	Germany	Attendance: 7,000; Referees: Krstić, Ljubič (SLO)
23 January 2012; 18:20	Eggert 7	(17–14)	four players 4	Attendance: 7,000; Referees: Krstić, Ljubič (SLO)
23 January 2012; 18:20	3× (yellow card) 2× (suspension)	Report	3× (yellow card) 3× (suspension)	Attendance: 7,000; Referees: Krstić, Ljubič (SLO)

23 January 2012; 20:20	Serbia	24–21	Sweden	Attendance: 19,000; Referees: Raluy, Sabroso (ESP)
23 January 2012; 20:20	Vujin 5	(14–11)	Ekdahl du Rietz 8	Attendance: 19,000; Referees: Raluy, Sabroso (ESP)
23 January 2012; 20:20	3× (yellow card) 3× (suspension)	Report	3× (yellow card) 3× (suspension)	Attendance: 19,000; Referees: Raluy, Sabroso (ESP)

25 January 2012; 16:15	Poland	33–32	Germany	Attendance: 1,000; Referees: Raluy, Sabroso (ESP)
25 January 2012; 16:15	Jurecki, Kuchczynski 5	(18–17)	Klein, Sprenger 7	Attendance: 1,000; Referees: Raluy, Sabroso (ESP)
25 January 2012; 16:15	2× (yellow card) 4× (suspension)	Report	3× (yellow card) 8× (suspension) 1× (red card)	Attendance: 1,000; Referees: Raluy, Sabroso (ESP)

25 January 2012; 18:15	Denmark	31–24	Sweden	Attendance: 5,200; Referees: Krstić, Ljubič (SLO)
25 January 2012; 18:15	Eggert 7	(18–11)	Andersson 8	Attendance: 5,200; Referees: Krstić, Ljubič (SLO)
25 January 2012; 18:15	3× (yellow card) 1× (suspension)	Report	3× (yellow card) 5× (suspension)	Attendance: 5,200; Referees: Krstić, Ljubič (SLO)

25 January 2012; 20:15	Serbia	19–22	Macedonia	Attendance: 24,805; Referees: Abrahamsen, Kristiansen (NOR)
25 January 2012; 20:15	Vujin 5	(10–11)	Lazarov 10	Attendance: 24,805; Referees: Abrahamsen, Kristiansen (NOR)
25 January 2012; 20:15	4× (yellow card) 1× (suspension)	Report	2× (yellow card) 4× (suspension)	Attendance: 24,805; Referees: Abrahamsen, Kristiansen (NOR)

=== Group II ===
Venue: Spens Sports Center, Novi Sad

==== Result ====
Team	Pld	W	D	L	GF	GA	GD	Pts
Spain	5	4	1	0	143	130	+13	9
Croatia	5	3	1	1	137	128	+9	7
Slovenia	5	2	0	3	153	156	−3	4
Hungary	5	1	2	2	125	130	−5	4
Iceland	5	1	1	3	143	146	−3	3
France	5	1	1	3	128	139	−11	3

==== Initial standing and matches ====
Team	Pld	W	D	L	GF	GA	GD	Pts
Croatia (D)	2	2	0	0	62	58	+4	4
Spain (C)	2	1	1	0	53	50	+3	3
Hungary (C)	2	1	1	0	50	47	+3	3
Slovenia (D)	2	1	0	1	63	63	0	2
Iceland (D)	2	0	0	2	61	65	−4	0
France (C)	2	0	0	2	49	55	−6	0

(C) and (D) above indicates from which group the teams came, in the main round they are only playing against teams from the other group.

22 January 2012; 16:10	Hungary	21–27	Iceland	Attendance: 4,500; Referees: Nikolić, Stojković (SRB)
22 January 2012; 16:10	Császár 7	(10–14)	Atlason, Sigurðsson 5	Attendance: 4,500; Referees: Nikolić, Stojković (SRB)
22 January 2012; 16:10	3× (yellow card) 4× (suspension)	Report	3× (yellow card) 6× (suspension)	Attendance: 4,500; Referees: Nikolić, Stojković (SRB)

22 January 2012; 18:10	France	28–26	Slovenia	Attendance: 4,700; Referees: Dinu, Din (ROU)
22 January 2012; 18:10	Barachet 6	(14–15)	Žvižej 6	Attendance: 4,700; Referees: Dinu, Din (ROU)
22 January 2012; 18:10	3× (yellow card) 3× (suspension)	Report	3× (yellow card) 7× (suspension)	Attendance: 4,700; Referees: Dinu, Din (ROU)

22 January 2012; 20:10	Spain	24–22	Croatia	Attendance: 7,500; Referees: Horáček, Novotný (CZE)
22 January 2012; 20:10	Tomás 5	(11–14)	Čupić 5	Attendance: 7,500; Referees: Horáček, Novotný (CZE)
22 January 2012; 20:10	3× (yellow card) 3× (suspension)	Report	3× (yellow card) 3× (suspension)	Attendance: 7,500; Referees: Horáček, Novotný (CZE)

24 January 2012; 16:10	Spain	31–26	Iceland	Attendance: 2,500; Referees: Nikolov, Nachevski (MKD)
24 January 2012; 16:10	Aguinagalde 5	(17–13)	Sigurðsson 6	Attendance: 2,500; Referees: Nikolov, Nachevski (MKD)
24 January 2012; 16:10	3× (yellow card) 2× (suspension)	Report	3× (yellow card) 2× (suspension)	Attendance: 2,500; Referees: Nikolov, Nachevski (MKD)

24 January 2012; 18:10	France	22–29	Croatia	Attendance: 7,500; Referees: Abrahamsen, Kristiansen (NOR)
24 January 2012; 18:10	Fernandez, Barachet 4	(12–11)	Kopljar, Čupić 7	Attendance: 7,500; Referees: Abrahamsen, Kristiansen (NOR)
24 January 2012; 18:10	3× (yellow card) 2× (suspension)	Report	3× (yellow card) 3× (suspension)	Attendance: 7,500; Referees: Abrahamsen, Kristiansen (NOR)

24 January 2012; 20:10	Hungary	30–32	Slovenia	Attendance: 6,800; Referees: Geipel, Helbig (GER)
24 January 2012; 20:10	Putics 7	(13–14)	Gajić 13	Attendance: 6,800; Referees: Geipel, Helbig (GER)
24 January 2012; 20:10	3× (yellow card) 5× (suspension) 1× (red card)	Report	4× (yellow card) 6× (suspension)	Attendance: 6,800; Referees: Geipel, Helbig (GER)

25 January 2012; 16:10	France	29–29	Iceland	Attendance: 2,800; Referees: Nikolić, Stojković (SRB)
25 January 2012; 16:10	Accambray 10	(11–15)	Sigurðsson 5	Attendance: 2,800; Referees: Nikolić, Stojković (SRB)
25 January 2012; 16:10	3× (yellow card) 2× (suspension)	Report	3× (yellow card) 1× (suspension)	Attendance: 2,800; Referees: Nikolić, Stojković (SRB)

25 January 2012; 18:10	Spain	35–32	Slovenia	Attendance: 3,200; Referees: Geipel, Helbig (GER)
25 January 2012; 18:10	Romero 7	(15–15)	Žvižej 7	Attendance: 3,200; Referees: Geipel, Helbig (GER)
25 January 2012; 18:10	3× (yellow card)	Report	3× (yellow card) 3× (suspension)	Attendance: 3,200; Referees: Geipel, Helbig (GER)

25 January 2012; 20:10	Hungary	24–24	Croatia	Attendance: 5,500; Referees: Din, Dinu (ROU)
25 January 2012; 20:10	Császár 14	(13–12)	Horvat 11	Attendance: 5,500; Referees: Din, Dinu (ROU)
25 January 2012; 20:10	2× (yellow card) 3× (suspension)	Report	4× (yellow card) 4× (suspension)	Attendance: 5,500; Referees: Din, Dinu (ROU)

== Knockout stage ==
Venue: Belgrade Arena, Belgrade

=== Bracket ===
Semi-finals
27 January – Belgrade
Serbia	26
Croatia	22
27 January – Belgrade
Spain	24
Denmark	25

Final
29 January – Belgrade
Serbia	19
Denmark	21
Third place
29 January – Belgrade
Croatia	31
Spain	27

=== Semifinals ===
27 January 2012; 17:45	Denmark	25–24	Spain	Attendance: 14,000; Referees: Krstić, Ljubič (SLO)
27 January 2012; 17:45	Lauge 6	(12–10)	Aguinagalde 5	Attendance: 14,000; Referees: Krstić, Ljubič (SLO)
27 January 2012; 17:45	4× (yellow card) 3× (suspension)	Report	3× (yellow card) 3× (suspension)	Attendance: 14,000; Referees: Krstić, Ljubič (SLO)

27 January 2012; 20:15	Serbia	26–22	Croatia	Attendance: 23,040; Referees: Lazaar, Reveret (FRA)
27 January 2012; 20:15	Ilić 8	(13–14)	Kopljar 7	Attendance: 23,040; Referees: Lazaar, Reveret (FRA)
27 January 2012; 20:15	3× (yellow card) 3× (suspension)	Report	3× (yellow card) 2× (suspension)	Attendance: 23,040; Referees: Lazaar, Reveret (FRA)

=== Fifth place game ===
27 January 2012; 15:15	Macedonia	28–27	Slovenia	Attendance: 5,500; Referees: Raluy, Sabroso (ESP)
27 January 2012; 15:15	Lazarov 8	(16–12)	Dolenec 7	Attendance: 5,500; Referees: Raluy, Sabroso (ESP)
27 January 2012; 15:15	3× (yellow card) 5× (suspension)	Report	3× (yellow card) 6× (suspension)	Attendance: 5,500; Referees: Raluy, Sabroso (ESP)

=== Bronze medal game ===
29 January 2012; 14:30	Croatia	31–27	Spain	Attendance: 8,500; Referees: Geipel, Helbig (GER)
29 January 2012; 14:30	Lacković, Čupić 7	(13–12)	Sarmiento 7	Attendance: 8,500; Referees: Geipel, Helbig (GER)
29 January 2012; 14:30	3× (yellow card) 5× (suspension)	Report	3× (yellow card) 2× (suspension)	Attendance: 8,500; Referees: Geipel, Helbig (GER)

=== Final ===
29 January 2012; 17:00	Serbia	19–21	Denmark	Attendance: 21,800; Referees: Abrahamsen, Kristiansen (NOR)
29 January 2012; 17:00	Prodanović 4	(7–9)	M. Hansen 9	Attendance: 21,800; Referees: Abrahamsen, Kristiansen (NOR)
29 January 2012; 17:00	4× (suspension) 1× (red card)	Report	2× (yellow card) 3× (suspension)	Attendance: 21,800; Referees: Abrahamsen, Kristiansen (NOR)

The final was played at the Belgrade Arena between the host-nation Serbia and Denmark, and was seen by 19,800 spectators. The teams played a match against each other in the group stage of the tournament, when Serbia defeated Denmark 24–22. Serbia's coach Veselin Vuković could not rely on Žarko Šešum, whose left eye was injured after he was hit with a bottle on the halftime break of the semi-final match against Croatia.

The match started with tough play by both teams and low scoring. Denmark claimed the lead in the early phase of the match and controlled the period. Serbia's attacks were ineffective, and goalkeeper Darko Stanić made several saves. The Danes made fewer mistakes in the attacks and Anders Eggert scored important goals in the counter-attacks. Denmark led at halftime 9–7.

Early in the second half Denmark took an 11–7 lead, but then the Serbian players halted the opponent's run with a better play in defence, except for Mikkel Hansen who scored with his powerful shots in the critical moments of the game. The Danes were having the lead all the time with a margin of 1–4 goals and thanks to the saves of their goalkeeper Niklas Landin Jacobsen prevented the Serbians to level the result. The last minutes of the game were played with many mistakes on both sides, but Hansen scored the decisive goal for peerless lead 21–18 with 20 seconds to go. Serbia scored until the end making it 21–19 in favor of Denmark at the end. This was the second title for Denmark after they have previously won the European Championship in 2008.

== Ranking and statistics ==
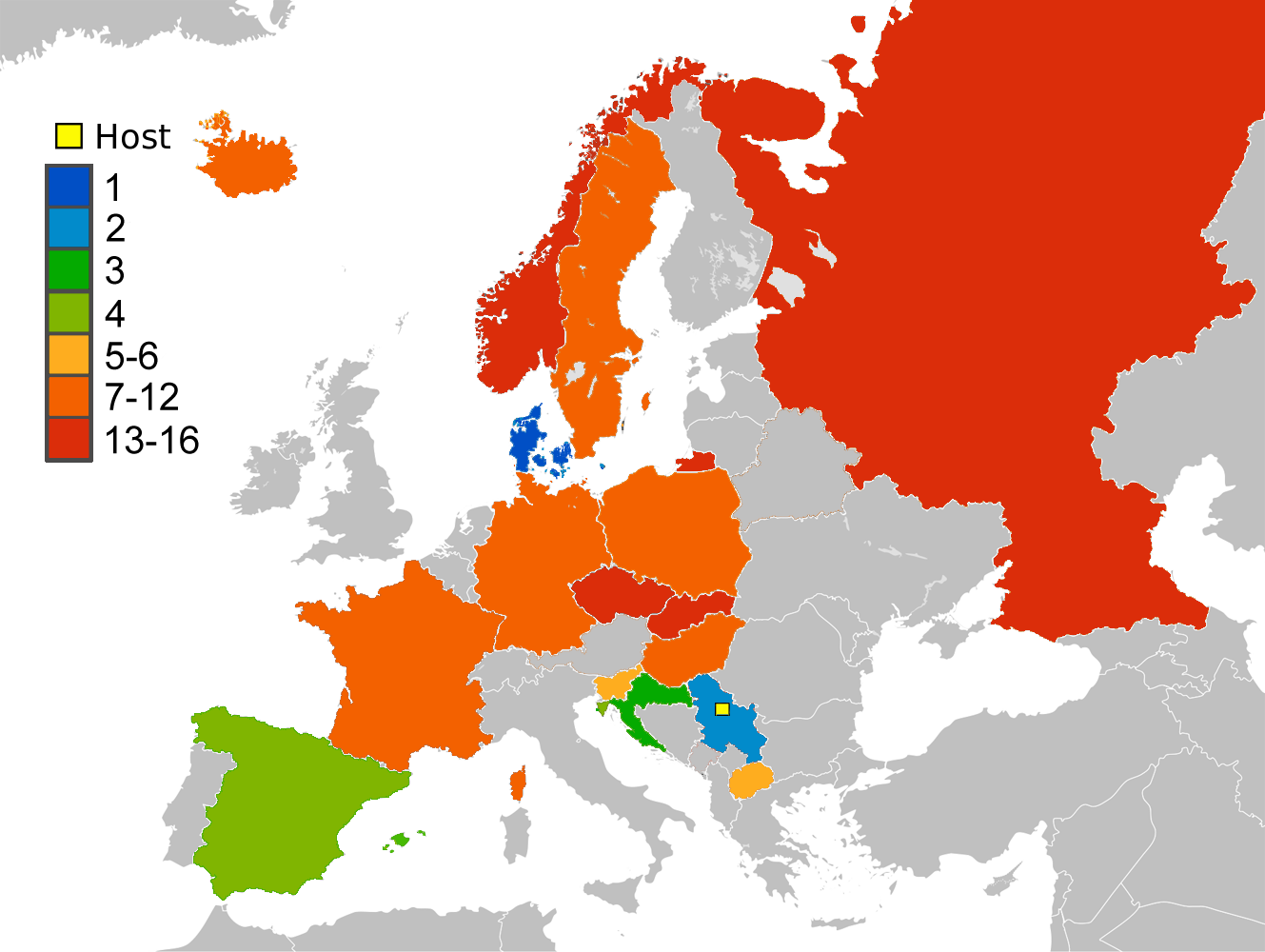
Result

=== Final ranking ===
The final ranking for places 7 to 16 was determined by the team's group stage record. In case the ranking would have been relevant for Olympic qualification, there would have been a placement match for 7th and 9th place.

Rank	Team	Qualification	
Rank	Team	WC	OG
Gold medal	Denmark	Q	Q
Silver medal	Serbia	Q	q
Bronze medal	Croatia	Q	q
4	Spain	H	q
5	Macedonia		q
6	Slovenia		
7	Germany		
8	Hungary		q
9	Poland		q
10	Iceland		q
11	France	C	Q
12	Sweden		q
13	Norway		
14	Czech Republic		
15	Russia		
16	Slovakia		

Based on this tournament	Team qualifies for the above-mentioned tournament (Q) or its qualification tournament (q)
Based on last world cup. H = host, C = champion	Team qualifies for the above-mentioned tournament (Q) or its qualification tournament (q)

=== All Star Team ===
- Goalkeeper: Darko Stanić (SRB)
- Left Wing: Guðjón Valur Sigurðsson (ISL)
- Left Back: Mikkel Hansen (DEN)
- Centre Back: Uroš Zorman (SLO)
- Pivot: Rene Toft Hansen (DEN)
- Right Back: Marko Kopljar (CRO)
- Right Wing: Christian Sprenger (GER)

=== Other awards ===
- Top Scorer : Kiril Lazarov (MKD)
- Best Defence Player : Viran Morros (ESP)
- Most Valuable Player: Momir Ilić (SRB)

Source: ehf-euro.com, 29.01.2012

=== Top goalscorers ===
Rank	Name	Goals	Shots	%	MP
1	Kiril Lazarov (MKD)	61	114	54	7
2	Dragan Gajić (SLO)	48	67	72	7
3	Mikkel Hansen (DEN)	45	89	51	8
4	Gábor Császár (HUN)	43	68	63	6
5	Ivan Čupić (CRO)	42	55	76	8
6	Guðjón Valur Sigurðsson (ISL)	41	63	65	6
7	Momir Ilić (SRB)	34	72	47	8
8	Niclas Ekberg (SWE)	33	51	65	6
9	Blazenko Lackovic (CRO)	32	56	57	8
10	Anders Eggert Jensen (DEN)	30	39	77	8
10	Luka Žvižej (SLO)	30	41	73	7
10	Jure Dolenec (SLO)	30	47	64	7

Source: EHF

== Controversies ==
=== Riots ===
On 24 January 2012, after the match between Croatia and France, Serbian hooligans attacked Croatian fans in several locations in Vojvodina, northern Serbia. In Novi Sad, Croatian supporters were heading home after the game, when they ran into a road block and some 50 masked men assaulted them with stones, bricks and axes, smashing windscreens. The attack left several supporters injured and one of them hospitalized. In Ruma, about 30 kilometres (19 mi) south from Novi Sad, a Croatian van was set on fire and one of the passengers stabbed with a knife.

A day later the unrest continued and many cars were damaged, torched, or burnt out throughout Novi Sad. The Croatian Foreign Ministry officially complained to Serbian Ambassador Stanimir Vukicevic over the attacks; Vukicevic expressed regret and stated that the Serbian police was already taking the necessary steps. Thirteen people were arrested in connection with the incident, including Ivan Ključovski and Jovan Bajić, leaders of a fan group from Novi Sad, and a member of the Obraz right-wing organization. After questioning, all of them remained in custody for a month.

=== Serbia–Croatia semifinal ===
Serbia and Croatia met in the semi-final of the tournament, which caused further concern on both sides. About 5,000 policemen were deployed to ensure the security of the fans, while in Croatia some tourist agencies cancelled trips for the match and the Croatian Handball Federation (Hrvatski rukometni savez, HRS) also recommended not to go to Serbia as the supporters' safety might not be guaranteed. Spokesman Zlatko Skrinjar also added that the HRS had planned to organize trips for the event, however, they changed their mind due to the incidents in the preceding days. On the Croatian-Serbian border, joint checkpoints were set up to prevent hooligans and other groups who have no ticket for the match to enter Serbia, and to escort the fans with tickets from the border to Belgrade.

The police reported that there were no incidents during the match, which was eventually won by the Serbians 26–22, however, a bottle actually meant for Croatian playmaker Ivano Balić and coach Slavko Goluža hit Serbian back player Žarko Šešum, severely injuring his eye. Šešum's eye suffered significant bleeding. After the trauma he had only minimal vision on the affected eye, but the risk of permanent sight loss was reportedly averted. Morten Stig Christensen, Secretary of the Danish Handball Federation, Serbia's opponent in the final said that he was "severely shocked" by the incident and so were the people from the European Handball Federation with whom he spoke. Christensen also added that he was shocked that although there were more than five thousand security personnel at the stadium, the hooligans still managed to sneak in Roman candles and laser lights.

== See also ==
- European Handball Federation
