= Uroš Zorman =

Slovenian handball player (born 1980)

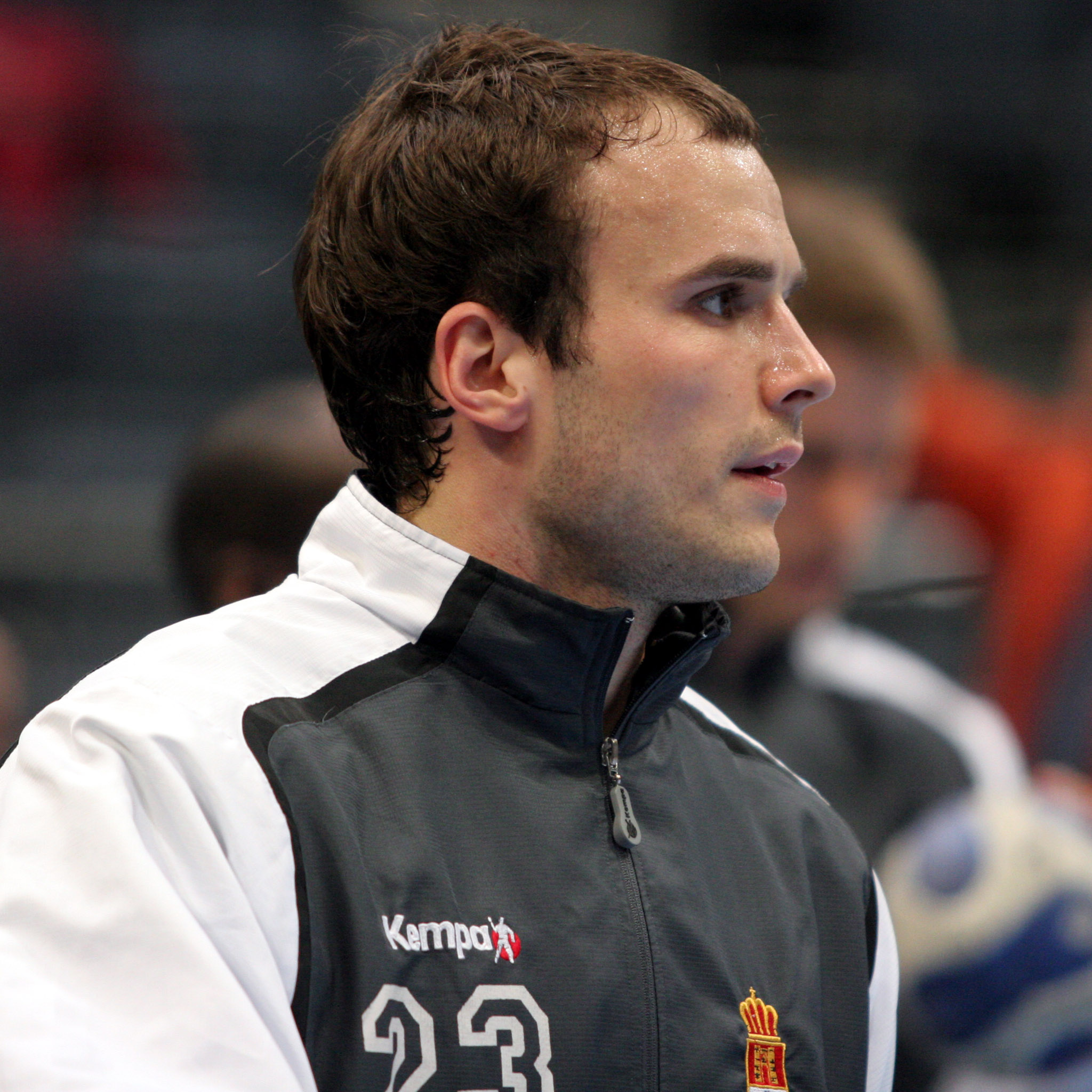

Personal information
- Nationality: Slovenian
- Born: 9 January 1980 (age 46) Kranj, SR Slovenia, Yugoslavia
- Height: 1.90 m (6 ft 3 in)

Sport
- Sport: Handball
- Position: Centre back
- Current club: RD Slovan and Slovenia (manager)

Senior clubs
- Years: Team
- –2000: RD Slovan
- 2000–2003: RD Prule 67
- 2003–2004: CB Ademar León
- 2004–2006: RK Celje
- 2006–2009: BM Ciudad Real
- 2009–2011: RK Celje
- 2011–2018: PGE Vive Kielce
National team
Years	Team	Apps	(Gls)
–2017	Slovenia	225	(523)

Teams managed
- 2018–2020: PGE Vive Kielce (assistant)
- 2019–2021: Slovenia (assistant)
- 2020–2024: RK Trimo Trebnje
- 2022–: Slovenia
- 2024–: RD Slovan
Medal record
European Championships
Silver medal – second place	2004 Slovenia

Uroš Zorman (born 9 January 1980) is a retired Slovenian handball player and the current manager of RD Slovan and the Slovenia national team. He is the all-time most capped player for Slovenia with 225 appearances.

During the 2012 European Men's Handball Championship, he had the most assists at the tournament with an average of 5.7 per game. In addition, he was named into the tournament's all-star team as the best playmaker.

== Honours ==
- EHF Champions League
  - Winner: 2004, 2008, 2009, 2016
  - Third place: 2013, 2015
- EHF Champions Trophy
  - Winner: 2004, 2008
- IHF Super Globe
  - Winner: 2007
- European Men's Handball Championship
  - Runner-up: 2004
