= Toon Leenders =

Dutch handball player (born 1986)

Personal information
- Nationality: Dutch
- Born: 17 April 1986 (age 40) Deurne, Netherlands
- Height: 2.02 m (6 ft 8 in)

Sport
- Sport: Handball
- Position: Pivot
- Current club: TV Emsdetten

Senior clubs
- Years: Team
- –2009: Bevo HC
- 2009–2012: HSG Nordhorn-Lingen
- 2012–2014: TUSEM Essen
- 2014–2015: HSG Nordhorn-Lingen
- 2015–2017: Bevo HC
- 2017–2021: HSG Nordhorn-Lingen
- 2022: HSG Nordhorn-Lingen
- 2024–: TV Emsdetten
National team
Years	Team	Apps	(Gls)
2006-	Netherlands	102	(165)
- Updated on 16 May 2024

Toon Leenders (born 17 April 1986) is a Dutch handball player for the German club TV Emsdetten and the Dutch national team.

He represented the Netherlands at the 2020 European Men's Handball Championship.
