= Olexandr Shevelev =

Ukrainian handball player

Personal information
- Full name: Olexandr Anatoliyovych Shevelev
- Nationality: Ukrainian
- Born: 2 December 1987 (age 38) Zaporizhia, Ukraine
- Height: 2.00 m (6 ft 7 in)

Sport
- Sport: Handball
- Position: Pivot
- Current club: AEK Athens
- Number: 7

Senior clubs
- Years: Team
- 2004-2010: HC Portovik Youjne
- 2010: Dynamo Astrakhan
- 2011: BM Ciudad Real
- 2011-2012: Aalborg Håndbold
- 2012-2013: Dinamo Minsk
- 2013-2018: HC Motor Zaporizhzhia
- 2018-2019: Donbas Mariupol
- 2019-2020: RK Eurofarm Pelister
- 2021-2024: AEK Athens
- 2024-: EschwegerTsv
National team
Years	Team	Apps	(Gls)
–	Ukraine	48	(99)

Olexandr Anatoliyovych Shevelev (Ukrainian: Олександр Анатолійович Шевелев, born 2 December 1987) is a Ukrainian professional handball player for the german club Eschweger Tsv and the Ukrainian national team. He has previously played for Danish club Aalborg Håndbold, Spanish club BM Ciudad Real, Macedonian RK Eurofarm Pelister, Russian Dynamo Astrakhan and Dinamo Minsk in Belarus.

He represented Ukraine at the 2020 European Men's Handball Championship.
