= Jure Natek =

Slovenian handball player

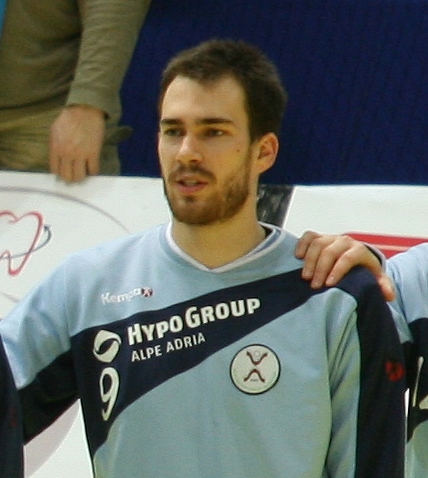

Personal information
- Nationality: Slovenian
- Born: 30 March 1982 (age 44) Ljubljana, SFR Yugoslavia
- Height: 1.93 m (6 ft 4 in)

Sport
- Sport: Handball
- Position: Right back
National team
Years	Team	Apps	(Gls)
–2015	Slovenia	154	(393)

Jure Natek (born 30 March 1982) is a retired Slovenian handball player who competed at the 2004 Summer Olympics.
