= Gábor Császár =

Hungarian handball player (born 1984)

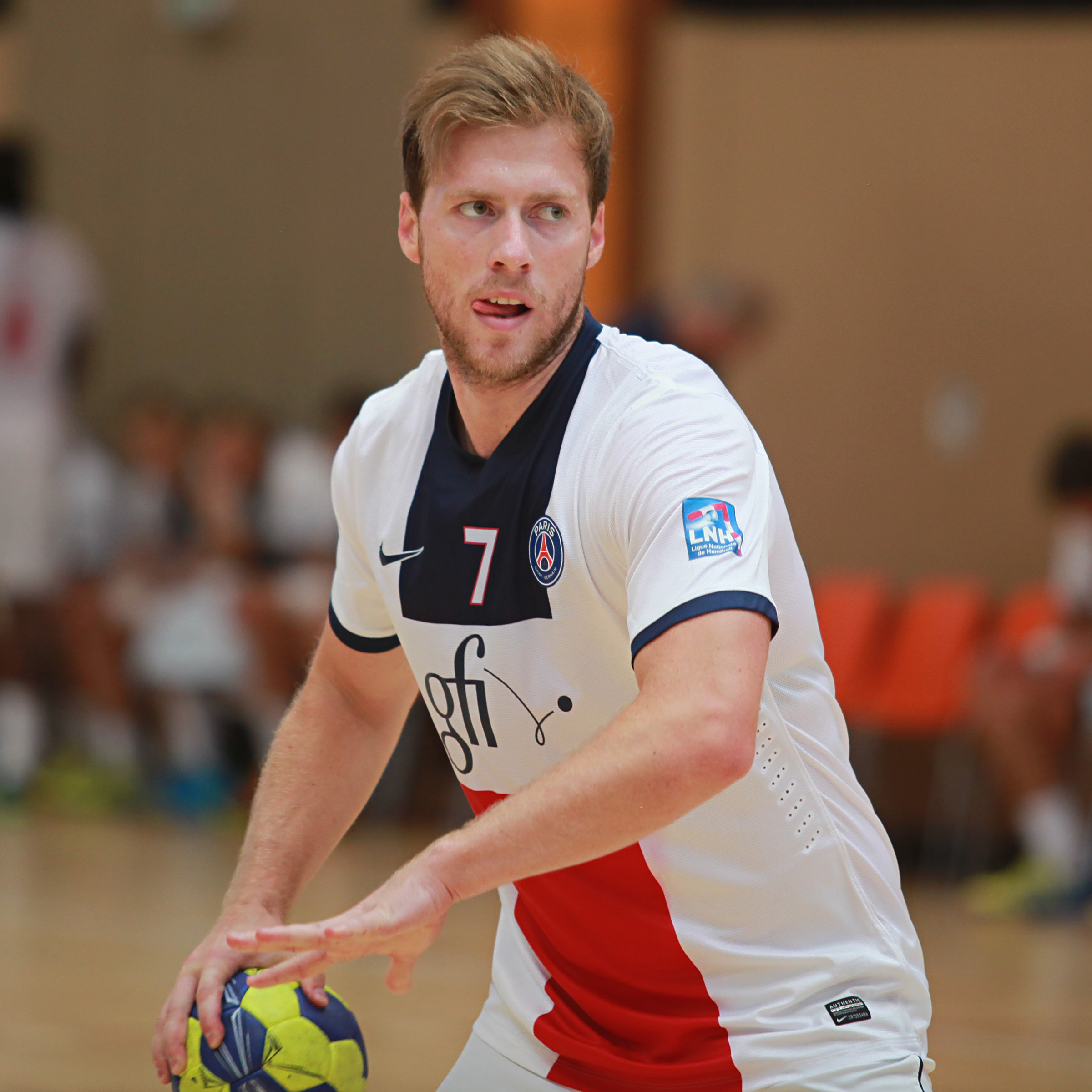

Personal information
- Nationality: Hungarian
- Born: 16 June 1984 (age 42) Celldömölk, Hungary
- Height: 1.86 m (6 ft 1 in)

Sport
- Sport: Handball
- Position: Centre back
- Current club: Ceglédi KKSE
- Number: 7

Senior clubs
- Years: Team
- 2001–2007: Dunaferr SE
- 2007–2008: Viborg HK
- 2008: → CB Cantabria (loan)
- 2009–2010: Chambéry Savoie HB
- 2010–2013: MKB Veszprém KC
- 2013–2015: PSG Handball
- 2015–2021: Kadetten Schaffhausen
- 2021–2022: GC Amicitia Zürich
- 2023: Ceglédi KKSE
National team
Years	Team	Apps	(Gls)
2004–2019	Hungary	247	(845)
Medal record
Junior World Championship
Bronze medal – third place	2005 Hungary

Gábor Császár (born 16 June 1984) is a Hungarian handball player for Ceglédi KKSE.

He made his full international debut on 17 January 2004 against Saudi Arabia. Just a few days later he was selected for the squad that represented Hungary on the 2004 European Championship. He participated on further six European Championships (2006, 2008, 2010, 2012, 2014, 2018) and was also present on six World Championships (2007, 2009, 2011, 2013, 2017, 2019). In addition, he was member of the Hungarian team that finished fourth at the 2004 Olympic Games and the team that finished fourth at the 2012 Summer Olympics.

== Achievements ==
- Nemzeti Bajnokság I:
  - Winner: 2011, 2012
  - Bronze Medalist: 2002, 2003, 2004, 2005, 2006, 2007
- Magyar Kupa:
  - Winner: 2011, 2012
  - Finalist: 2007
- Ligue Nationale de Handball:
  - Silver Medalist: 2010
- Coupe de France:
  - Semi-finalist: 2010
- Coupe de la Ligue:
  - Semi-finalist: 2010
- EHF Cup Winners' Cup:
  - Semi-finalist: 2002
- EHF Cup:
  - Semi-finalist: 2003
- Junior World Championship:
  - Bronze Medalist: 2005

== Individual awards ==
- Golden Cross of the Cross of Merit of the Republic of Hungary (2012)
- Hungarian Handballer of the Year: 2012
