= Dragan Gajić =

Slovenian handball player (born 1984)

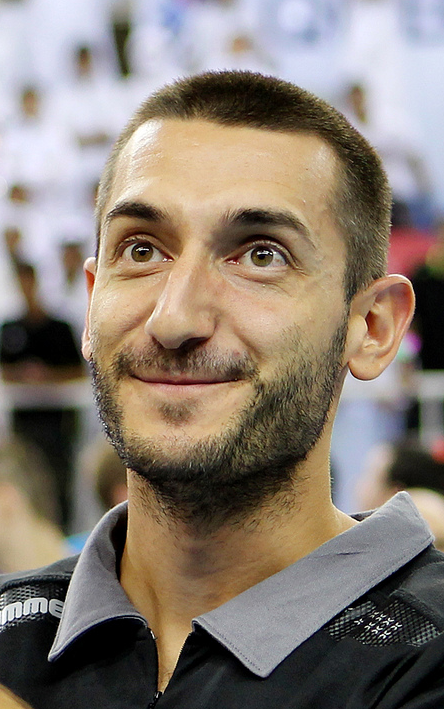

Personal information
- Nationality: Slovenian
- Born: 21 July 1984 (age 42) Celje, SFR Yugoslavia
- Height: 1.88 m (6 ft 2 in)

Sport
- Sport: Handball
- Position: Right wing

Senior clubs
- Years: Team
- 2000–2003: RK Celje
- 2003–2004: RD Rudar Trbovlje
- 2004–2009: RK Celje
- 2009–2010: RK Zagreb
- 2010–2011: RK Celje
- 2011: RK Maribor Branik
- 2011–2016: Montpellier Handball
- 2016–2020: Telekom Veszprém
- 2020–2024: Limoges Hand 87
National team
Years	Team	Apps	(Gls)
2005–2021	Slovenia	161	(692)

Dragan Gajić (born 21 July 1984) is a Slovenian retired handball player.

== Individual awards ==
- EHF Cup Top Scorer: 2014 (72 goals)
- World Men's Handball Championship Top Scorer: 2015 (71 goals)
- World Men's Handball Championship All Star Team: 2015
