= Christian Sprenger (handballer) =

German handball player (born 1983)

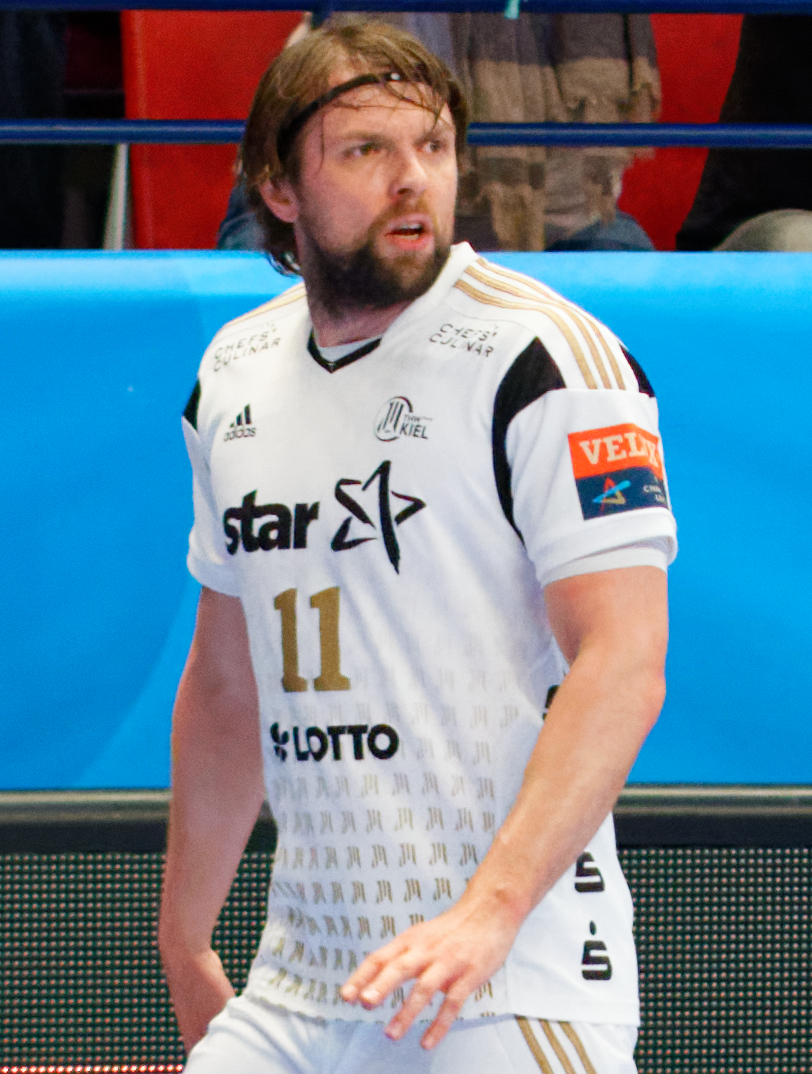
- Sprenger in 2017

Personal information
- Full name: Christian Sprenger
- Nationality: German
- Born: 6 April 1983 (age 43) Ludwigsfelde, East Germany
- Height: 1.90 m (6 ft 3 in)

Sport
- Sport: Handball
- Position: Right Wing

Youth career
- Years: Team
- 1991–1998: Ludwigsfelder HC
- 1998–2002: SC Magdeburg

Senior clubs
- Years: Team
- 2002–2009: SC Magdeburg
- 2009–2017: THW Kiel
National team
| Years | Team | Apps | (Gls) |
| 2002–2012 | Germany | 86 | (185) |

Teams managed
- 2017–: THW Kiel (assistant)
- Updated on 16 December 2011

Christian Sprenger (born 6 April 1983) is a German former handball player. Currently he is the assistant coach of THW Kiel.

He made his international debut on 4 January 2002 against Switzerland.

== Achievements ==
- Handball-Bundesliga:
  - Winner: 2010, 2012, 2013, 2014, 2015
- DHB-Pokal:
  - Winner: 2011, 2012, 2013, 2017
- DHB-Supercup:
  - Winner: 2011, 2012, 2014, 2015
- IHF Men's Super Globe:
  - Winner: 2011
- EHF Champions League:
  - Winner: 2010, 2012
- EHF Cup:
  - Winner: 2007

== Individual awards ==
- All-Star Right Wing of the European Championship: 2012
