= Henrik Møllgaard =

Danish former handball player and coach (born 1985)

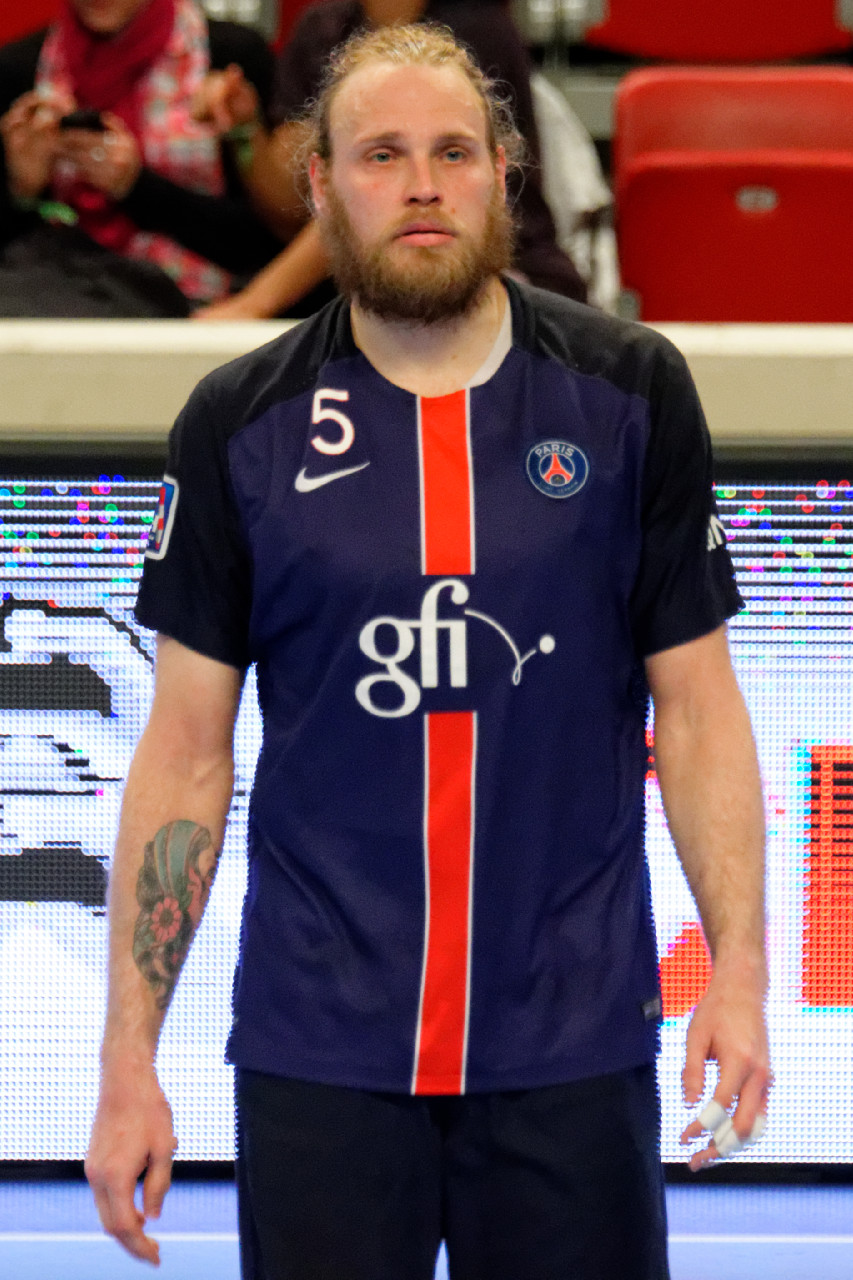
- Møllgaard in 2016

Personal information
- Full name: Henrik Møllgaard Jensen
- Nationality: Danish
- Born: 2 January 1985 (age 41) Bramming, Denmark
- Height: 1.97 m (6 ft 6 in)

Sport
- Sport: Handball
- Position: Left back/Centre back

Youth career
- Years: Team
- –: Kongeå HK
- –2005: Ribe HK

Senior clubs
- Years: Team
- 2005–2009: KIF Kolding
- 2009–2012: Aalborg Håndbold
- 2012–2016: Skjern Håndbold
- 2014: → Lekhwiya SC (loan)
- 2015–2016: → Paris Saint-Germain (loan)
- 2016–2018: Paris Saint-Germain
- 2018–2025: Aalborg Håndbold
National team
Years	Team	Apps	(Gls)
2006–2025	Denmark	230	(182)

Teams managed
- 2024–2025: Aalborg Håndbold (assistant)
- 2025–: Paris Saint-Germain (assistant)
- 2026–: Denmark (assistant)
Medal record
Olympic Games
Gold medal – first place	2016 Rio de Janeiro	Team
Gold medal – first place	2024 Paris	Team
Silver medal – second place	2020 Tokyo	Team
World Championship
Gold medal – first place	2019 Germany/Denmark	Team
Gold medal – first place	2021 Egypt	Team
Gold medal – first place	2023 Poland/Sweden	Team
Gold medal – first place	2025 Croatia/Denmark/Norway	Team
Silver medal – second place	2013 Spain	Team
European Championship
Silver medal – second place	2014 Denmark	Team
Silver medal – second place	2024 Germany	Team
Bronze medal – third place	2022 Hungary/Slovakia	Team
Junior World Championship
Gold medal – first place	2005 Hungary	Team

Henrik Møllgaard Jensen (born 2 January 1985) is a Danish former handballer and current assistant coach for PSG Handball. He previously played for Aalborg Håndbold and the Danish national team.

He was known for his versatility, playing all three back positions and pivot when needed, but later in his career, he primarily excelled as a defender. He previously played for PSG Handball, KIF Kolding, Kongeå HK, Ribe HK, and Skjern Håndbold.

== Career ==
He started his senior career at KIF Kolding, before moving to Aalborg Håndbold, and later to Skjern Håndbold in 2012. In the 2013–14 season, he was the top scorer in the Danish League and was named to the league's all-star team as a left back. In that season, he won the Danish Cup.

In May 2014, he joined the Qatari club Lekhwiya SC for four weeks on a loan deal.

=== PSG ===
On 25 June 2015, it was announced that Henrik Møllgaard would join PSG Handball on a one-year loan contract due to long-term injuries to William Accambray. On 4 January 2016, Skjern Håndbold announced that Henrik Møllgaard would join PSG Handball permanently from the start of the 2016–17 season on a three-year contract. PSG Handball paid an undisclosed fee for the transfer. He won the French championship in 2016, 2017, and 2018, and the French Cup in 2018.

=== Return to Aalborg Håndbold ===
On 27 October 2017, it was announced that he would return to play for Aalborg Håndbold in 2018. He won the Danish championship in 2019, 2020, 2021, and 2024.

In 2024, Henrik Møllgaard became the player-assistant coach at Aalborg Håndbold when the club fired head coach Maik Machulla mid-season. The club promoted former assistant coach Simon Dahl to head coach and appointed Møllgaard as assistant to Dahl.

In December 2024, he announced his retirement as a player at the end of the 2024–25 season and his departure from Aalborg Håndbold. He subsequently joined his former team PSG Handball as assistant coach under Danish coach Stefan Madsen. He played his last match for the Danish national team on 15 March 2025 against France and was celebrated by Danish fans after the match.

In February 2025, he won the Danish Cup with Aalborg Håndbold, beating Bjerringbro-Silkeborg in the final. Later that season, he won the Danish championship.

== Coaching career ==
In April 2026 he was announced as the assistant coach on the Danish national team, replacing Henrik Kronborg.

== Trophies ==
- EHF Champions League:
  - Second-place: 2017, 2021, 2024
- IHF Super Globe:
  - Second-place: 2016
- Danish League:
  - Winner: 2006, 2009, 2010, 2019, 2020, 2021
  - Second-place: 2022, 2023
- Danish Cup:
  - Winner: 2007, 2019, 2022, 2025
  - Second-place: 2012, 2021, 2024
- Danish Super Cup:
  - Winner: 2019, 2020, 2021, 2022, 2024
  - Second-place: 2017, 2023
- French League:
  - Winner: 2016, 2017, 2018
- French League Cup:
  - Winner: 2017, 2018
  - Second-place: 2016
- French Cup:
  - Winner: 2018
  - Second-place: 2016
- French Super Cup:
  - Winner: 2015, 2016
  - Second-place: 2017

== Individual awards ==
- Best Defence Player of the European Championship: 2016
- Top Goalscorer of the Danish Handball League: 2014
- Best Defence Player of EHF Champions League: 2021
- Danish Handball Cup MVP: 2012
