= Simon Dahl (handballer) =

Danish handball coach for Aalborg Håndbold (born 1991)

Personal information
- Nationality: Danish
- Born: 8 May 1991 (age 35) Hvide Sande, Denmark

Sport
- Sport: Handball
- Current club: Aalborg Håndbold (head coach)

Senior clubs
- Years: Team
- –: Skjern Håndbold (youth)

Teams managed
- 2010–2015: Skjern Håndbold (youth/assistant)
- 2015–2019: Nordsjælland Håndbold (assistant)
- 2019–2023: Nordsjælland Håndbold (head coach)
- 2023–2024: Aalborg Håndbold (assistant)
- 2024–: Aalborg Håndbold (head coach)

Simon Dahl (born 8 May 1991) is a Danish handball coach for Aalborg Håndbold.

Born in Hvide Sande, Denmark, Dahl began his handball career at his hometown club before joining Skjern Håndbold as a youth player. A shoulder injury forced him to retire early from playing before reaching the senior level. Transitioning to coaching, he developed a keen interest in the tactical side of the game, citing playmaker and former national team coach Jesper Jensen as his idol. From 2010 to 2015, Dahl served as a youth and assistant coach at Skjern Håndbold.

In 2015, at age 23, Dahl joined Nordsjælland Håndbold as an assistant coach and was promoted to head coach in 2019, making him the youngest head coach in the league. During this period, he also served as an assistant coach for the Danish U21 national team. In 2022, he moved to top club Aalborg Håndbold as an assistant coach under Stefan Madsen and later Maik Machulla. When Machulla was sacked in November 2024, Dahl was appointed interim head coach, with world champion Henrik Møllgaard as his player-assistant coach. His tenure began impressively, winning his first 14 games in charge.

In February 2025, Dahl led Aalborg to the Danish Cup, defeating Bjerringbro-Silkeborg 34–29 in the Santander Final4. Later that season, he guided Aalborg to the Danish championship, securing the title for the second consecutive year. His appointment as permanent head coach was confirmed in February 2025. In April 2026 he extended his contract with the club until 2029. He same season he won his second Danish Championship.

== Personal life ==
Dahl’s brother, Jesper Dahl, is a professional handball player.
