= 2013–14 EHF Champions League knockout stage =

This page describes the knockout stage of the 2013–14 EHF Champions League.

== Last 16 ==
The draw was held on 25 February 2014 at 12:00 in Vienna, Austria. The first legs will be played on 20–23 March, and the second legs on 29–31 March 2014.

=== Seedings ===
Pot 1	Pot 2	Pot 3	Pot 4
(Hungary) MKB-MVM Veszprém (Germany) THW Kiel (Spain) Barcelona (Germany) HSV Hamburg	(Germany) Rhein-Neckar Löwen (Denmark) KIF Kolding (France) Paris Saint-Germain (Germany) Flensburg	(Slovenia) Celje (Poland) Vive Targi Kielce (North Macedonia) Metalurg Skopje (Slovenia) Gorenje	(Ukraine) Motor Zaporizhzhia (Poland) Wisła Płock (North Macedonia) Vardar (Denmark) Aalborg

=== Matches ===
Team 1	Agg.	Team 2	1st leg	2nd leg
Motor Zaporizhzhia (Ukraine)	56–71	(Germany) THW Kiel	28–31	28–40
Aalborg (Denmark)	42–60	(Spain) Barcelona	22–29	20–31
Vardar (North Macedonia)	58–57	(Germany) HSV Hamburg	28–28	30–29
Wisła Płock (Poland)	60–64	(Hungary) MKB-MVM Veszprém	34–33	26–31
Gorenje (Slovenia)	55–62	(France) Paris Saint-Germain	30–28	25–34
Ceje (Slovenia)	53–55	(Germany) Flensburg	26–25	27–30
Metalurg Skopje (North Macedonia)	53–43	(Denmark) KIF Kolding	23–17	30–26
Vive Targi Kielce (Poland)	55–55	(Germany) Rhein-Neckar Löwen	32–28	23–27

==== First leg ====
20 March 2014; 19:15	Motor Zaporizhzhia (Ukraine)	28–31	(Germany) THW Kiel	Széchenyi István Egyetem Arena, Györ; Attendance: 1,900; Referees: Nikolić, Stojković (SRB)
20 March 2014; 19:15	Aflitulin 6	(14–16)	Jícha, Vujin 7	Széchenyi István Egyetem Arena, Györ; Attendance: 1,900; Referees: Nikolić, Stojković (SRB)
20 March 2014; 19:15	3× (yellow card) 6× (suspension)	Report	3× (yellow card) 5× (suspension)	Széchenyi István Egyetem Arena, Györ; Attendance: 1,900; Referees: Nikolić, Stojković (SRB)

22 March 2014; 16:10	Vive Targi Kielce (Poland)	32–28	(Germany) Rhein-Neckar Löwen	Hala Legionów, Kielce; Attendance: 4,000; Referees: Gousko, Repkin (BLR)
22 March 2014; 16:10	Lijewski 9	(17–13)	Groetzki 7	Hala Legionów, Kielce; Attendance: 4,000; Referees: Gousko, Repkin (BLR)
22 March 2014; 16:10	3× (yellow card) 4× (suspension)	Report	3× (yellow card) 5× (suspension) 1× (red card)	Hala Legionów, Kielce; Attendance: 4,000; Referees: Gousko, Repkin (BLR)

22 March 2014; 18:00	Vardar (North Macedonia)	28–28	(Germany) HSV Hamburg	Boris Trajkovski Sports Center, Skopje; Attendance: 6,400; Referees: Dobrovits, Tájok (HUN)
22 March 2014; 18:00	Dibirov 9	(14–16)	Schröder 9	Boris Trajkovski Sports Center, Skopje; Attendance: 6,400; Referees: Dobrovits, Tájok (HUN)
22 March 2014; 18:00	1× (yellow card) 2× (suspension)	Report	2× (yellow card) 5× (suspension) 1× (red card)	Boris Trajkovski Sports Center, Skopje; Attendance: 6,400; Referees: Dobrovits, Tájok (HUN)

22 March 2014; 20:30	Gorenje (Slovenia)	30–28	(France) Paris Saint-Germain	Red Hall, Velenje; Attendance: 1,500; Referees: Fleisch, Rieber (GER)
22 March 2014; 20:30	Šoštarič 9	(16–13)	Melić 7	Red Hall, Velenje; Attendance: 1,500; Referees: Fleisch, Rieber (GER)
22 March 2014; 20:30	3× (yellow card) 5× (suspension)	Report	2× (yellow card) 1× (suspension)	Red Hall, Velenje; Attendance: 1,500; Referees: Fleisch, Rieber (GER)

23 March 2014; 15:00	Aalborg (Denmark)	22–29	(Spain) Barcelona	Gigantium, Aalborg; Attendance: 4,666; Referees: Gubica, Milošević (CRO)
23 March 2014; 15:00	Slundt 6	(13–15)	three players 4	Gigantium, Aalborg; Attendance: 4,666; Referees: Gubica, Milošević (CRO)
23 March 2014; 15:00	3× (yellow card) 3× (suspension)	Report	3× (yellow card) 2× (suspension)	Gigantium, Aalborg; Attendance: 4,666; Referees: Gubica, Milošević (CRO)

23 March 2014; 16:55	Metalurg Skopje (North Macedonia)	23–17	(Denmark) KIF Kolding	Boris Trajkovski Sports Center, Skopje; Attendance: 6,963; Referees: Stark, Ştefan (ROU)
23 March 2014; 16:55	Vugrinec 13	(14–9)	Laen 5	Boris Trajkovski Sports Center, Skopje; Attendance: 6,963; Referees: Stark, Ştefan (ROU)
23 March 2014; 16:55	3× (yellow card) 5× (suspension)	Report	3× (yellow card) 3× (suspension)	Boris Trajkovski Sports Center, Skopje; Attendance: 6,963; Referees: Stark, Ştefan (ROU)

23 March 2014; 19:00	Wisła Płock (Poland)	34–33	(Hungary) MKB-MVM Veszprém	Orlen Arena, Płock; Attendance: 5,467; Referees: Krstić, Ljubić (SLO)
23 March 2014; 19:00	Ghionea 7	(16–16)	Ilić, Sulić 8	Orlen Arena, Płock; Attendance: 5,467; Referees: Krstić, Ljubić (SLO)
23 March 2014; 19:00	3× (yellow card) 5× (suspension)	Report	3× (yellow card) 2× (suspension)	Orlen Arena, Płock; Attendance: 5,467; Referees: Krstić, Ljubić (SLO)

23 March 2014; 19:15	Celje (Slovenia)	26–25	(Germany) Flensburg	Zlatorog Arena, Celje; Attendance: 4,600; Referees: Togstad, Kristiansen (NOR)
23 March 2014; 19:15	Zelenović 8	(13–12)	Glandorf 7	Zlatorog Arena, Celje; Attendance: 4,600; Referees: Togstad, Kristiansen (NOR)
23 March 2014; 19:15	3× (yellow card) 1× (suspension)	Report	3× (yellow card) 3× (suspension)	Zlatorog Arena, Celje; Attendance: 4,600; Referees: Togstad, Kristiansen (NOR)

==== Second leg ====
29 March 2014; 14:00	MKB-MVM Veszprém (Hungary)	31–26	(Poland) Wisła Płock	Veszprém Aréna, Veszprém; Attendance: 5,019; Referees: Dinu, Din (ROU)
29 March 2014; 14:00	Ilić 7	(16–11)	four players 4	Veszprém Aréna, Veszprém; Attendance: 5,019; Referees: Dinu, Din (ROU)
29 March 2014; 14:00	3× (yellow card) 9× (suspension) 1× (red card)	Report	3× (yellow card) 4× (suspension) 1× (red card)	Veszprém Aréna, Veszprém; Attendance: 5,019; Referees: Dinu, Din (ROU)

Veszprém won 64–60 on aggregate.

29 March 2014; 17:30	Flensburg (Germany)	30–27	(Slovenia) Celje	Campushalle, Flensburg; Attendance: 4,027; Referees: Zotin, Volodkov (RUS)
29 March 2014; 17:30	three players 6	(15–14)	Marguč 8	Campushalle, Flensburg; Attendance: 4,027; Referees: Zotin, Volodkov (RUS)
29 March 2014; 17:30	3× (yellow card) 3× (suspension)	Report	3× (yellow card) 5× (suspension)	Campushalle, Flensburg; Attendance: 4,027; Referees: Zotin, Volodkov (RUS)

Flensburg won 55–53 on aggregate.

29 March 2014; 20:30	Barcelona (Spain)	31–20	(Denmark) Aalborg	Palau Blaugrana, Barcelona; Attendance: 2,514; Referees: Johansson, Kliko (SWE)
29 March 2014; 20:30	Lazarov 6	(16–11)	Larsen, Tvedten 4	Palau Blaugrana, Barcelona; Attendance: 2,514; Referees: Johansson, Kliko (SWE)
29 March 2014; 20:30	2× (yellow card) 1× (suspension)	Report	3× (yellow card) 3× (suspension)	Palau Blaugrana, Barcelona; Attendance: 2,514; Referees: Johansson, Kliko (SWE)

Barcelona won 60–42 on aggregate.

30 March 2014; 16:45	KIF Kolding (Denmark)	26–30	(North Macedonia) Metalurg Skopje	Brøndby Hall, Brøndby; Attendance: 2,857; Referees: Horáček, Novotný (CZE)
30 March 2014; 16:45	Rocas, Spellerberg 5	(13–15)	Vugrinec 10	Brøndby Hall, Brøndby; Attendance: 2,857; Referees: Horáček, Novotný (CZE)
30 March 2014; 16:45	2× (yellow card) 4× (suspension)	Report	2× (yellow card) 5× (suspension)	Brøndby Hall, Brøndby; Attendance: 2,857; Referees: Horáček, Novotný (CZE)

Metalurg won 53–43 on aggregate.

30 March 2014; 17:00	Paris Saint-Germain (France)	34–25	(Slovenia) Gorenje	Stade Pierre de Coubertin, Paris; Attendance: 2,750; Referees: López, Ramírez (ESP)
30 March 2014; 17:00	Gunnarsson, Hansen 7	(17–17)	three players 5	Stade Pierre de Coubertin, Paris; Attendance: 2,750; Referees: López, Ramírez (ESP)
30 March 2014; 17:00	3× (yellow card) 3× (suspension)	Report	3× (yellow card) 3× (suspension)	Stade Pierre de Coubertin, Paris; Attendance: 2,750; Referees: López, Ramírez (ESP)

Paris won 62–55 on aggregate.

30 March 2014; 17:15	THW Kiel (Germany)	40–28	(Ukraine) Motor Zaporizhzhia	Sparkassen-Arena, Kiel; Attendance: 8,000; Referees: Dentz, Reibel (FRA)
30 March 2014; 17:15	Jícha 6	(20–13)	Onufryienko 6	Sparkassen-Arena, Kiel; Attendance: 8,000; Referees: Dentz, Reibel (FRA)
30 March 2014; 17:15	3× (yellow card) 2× (suspension)	Report	3× (yellow card) 3× (suspension)	Sparkassen-Arena, Kiel; Attendance: 8,000; Referees: Dentz, Reibel (FRA)

Kiel won 71–56 on aggregate.

30 March 2014; 18:45	HSV Hamburg (Germany)	29–30	(North Macedonia) Vardar	Alsterdorfer Sporthalle, Hamburg; Attendance: 2,904; Referees: Gjeding, Hansen (DEN)
30 March 2014; 18:45	Duvnjak, Schröder 7	(15–17)	Karačić 8	Alsterdorfer Sporthalle, Hamburg; Attendance: 2,904; Referees: Gjeding, Hansen (DEN)
30 March 2014; 18:45	3× (yellow card) 2× (suspension)	Report		Alsterdorfer Sporthalle, Hamburg; Attendance: 2,904; Referees: Gjeding, Hansen (DEN)

Vardar won 58–57 on aggregate.

31 March 2014; 19:00	Rhein-Neckar Löwen (Germany)	27–23	(Poland) Vive Targi Kielce	SAP Arena, Mannheim; Attendance: 8,805; Referees: Nikolov, Nachevski (MKD)
31 March 2014; 19:00	Groetzki, Sigurmannsson 5	(16–14)	Jurecki 5	SAP Arena, Mannheim; Attendance: 8,805; Referees: Nikolov, Nachevski (MKD)
31 March 2014; 19:00	3× (yellow card) 3× (suspension)	Report	3× (yellow card) 3× (suspension)	SAP Arena, Mannheim; Attendance: 8,805; Referees: Nikolov, Nachevski (MKD)

55–55 on aggregate. Rhein-Neckar Löwen won on away goals.

== Quarterfinals ==
The draw was held on 1 April 2014 at 12:15 in Vienna, Austria. The first legs were played on 19–21 April, and the second legs on 26–27 April 2014.

=== Seedings ===
Pot 1	Pot 2
(Hungary) MKB-MVM Veszprém	(Germany) Rhein-Neckar Löwen
(Germany) THW Kiel	(North Macedonia) Metalurg Skopje
(Spain) Barcelona	(France) Paris Saint-Germain
(North Macedonia) Vardar	(Germany) Flensburg

=== Matches ===
Team 1	Agg.	Team 2	1st leg	2nd leg
Rhein-Neckar Löwen (Germany)	62–62	(Spain) Barcelona	38–31	24–31
Flensburg (Germany)	49–49	(North Macedonia) Vardar	24–22	25–27
Metalurg Skopje (North Macedonia)	47–65	(Germany) THW Kiel	21–31	26–34
Paris Saint-Germain (France)	52–59	(Hungary) MKB-MVM Veszprém	26–28	26–31

==== First leg ====
19 April 2014; 16:30	Paris Saint-Germain (France)	26–28	(Hungary) MKB-MVM Veszprém	Stade Pierre de Coubertin, Paris; Attendance: 3,600; Referees: Gubica, Milošević (CRO)
19 April 2014; 16:30	M'Tima 5	(14–12)	Nagy 9	Stade Pierre de Coubertin, Paris; Attendance: 3,600; Referees: Gubica, Milošević (CRO)
19 April 2014; 16:30	3× (yellow card)	Report	3× (yellow card) 4× (suspension)	Stade Pierre de Coubertin, Paris; Attendance: 3,600; Referees: Gubica, Milošević (CRO)

19 April 2014; 18:30	Metalurg Skopje (North Macedonia)	21–31	(Germany) THW Kiel	Boris Trajkovski Sports Center, Skopje; Attendance: 6,963; Referees: Baďura, Ondogrecula (SVK)
19 April 2014; 18:30	Manaskov 6	(9–14)	Vujin 8	Boris Trajkovski Sports Center, Skopje; Attendance: 6,963; Referees: Baďura, Ondogrecula (SVK)
19 April 2014; 18:30	3× (yellow card) 3× (suspension)	Report	2× (yellow card) 5× (suspension) 1× (red card)	Boris Trajkovski Sports Center, Skopje; Attendance: 6,963; Referees: Baďura, Ondogrecula (SVK)

20 April 2014; 19:15	Rhein-Neckar Löwen (Germany)	38–31	(Spain) Barcelona	SAP Arena, Mannheim; Attendance: 12,900; Referees: Dentz, Reibel (FRA)
20 April 2014; 19:15	Gensheimer 14	(22–14)	Lazarov 10	SAP Arena, Mannheim; Attendance: 12,900; Referees: Dentz, Reibel (FRA)
20 April 2014; 19:15	3× (yellow card) 5× (suspension)	Report	3× (yellow card) 3× (suspension)	SAP Arena, Mannheim; Attendance: 12,900; Referees: Dentz, Reibel (FRA)

21 April 2014; 19:00	Flensburg (Germany)	24–22	(North Macedonia) Vardar	Campushalle, Flensburg; Attendance: 6,000; Referees: Dinu, Din (ROU)
21 April 2014; 19:00	Eggert 6	(13–14)	Karačić 9	Campushalle, Flensburg; Attendance: 6,000; Referees: Dinu, Din (ROU)
21 April 2014; 19:00	3× (yellow card) 5× (suspension)	Report	3× (yellow card) 3× (suspension)	Campushalle, Flensburg; Attendance: 6,000; Referees: Dinu, Din (ROU)

==== Second leg ====
26 April 2014; 16:00	MKB-MVM Veszprém (Hungary)	31–26	(France) Paris Saint-Germain	Veszprém Aréna, Veszprém; Attendance: 5,019; Referees: Nikolov, Nachevski (MKD)
26 April 2014; 16:00	Ilić, Sulić 8	(12–12)	Hansen 9	Veszprém Aréna, Veszprém; Attendance: 5,019; Referees: Nikolov, Nachevski (MKD)
26 April 2014; 16:00	3× (yellow card) 5× (suspension)	Report	3× (yellow card) 3× (suspension)	Veszprém Aréna, Veszprém; Attendance: 5,019; Referees: Nikolov, Nachevski (MKD)

Veszprém won 52–59 on aggregate.

26 April 2014; 17:00	Vardar (North Macedonia)	27–25	(Germany) Flensburg	Boris Trajkovski Sports Center, Skopje; Attendance: 6,963; Referees: López, Ramírez (ESP)
26 April 2014; 17:00	Brumen 7	(10–15)	Eggert 7	Boris Trajkovski Sports Center, Skopje; Attendance: 6,963; Referees: López, Ramírez (ESP)
26 April 2014; 17:00	2× (yellow card) 3× (suspension)	Report	3× (yellow card) 3× (suspension)	Boris Trajkovski Sports Center, Skopje; Attendance: 6,963; Referees: López, Ramírez (ESP)

49–49 on aggregate. Flensburg won on away goals.

26 April 2014; 20:15	Barcelona (Spain)	31–24	(Germany) Rhein-Neckar Löwen	Palau Blaugrana, Barcelona; Attendance: 6,814; Referees: Nikolić, Stojković (SRB)
26 April 2014; 20:15	Karabatić 7	(15–11)	Groetzki 7	Palau Blaugrana, Barcelona; Attendance: 6,814; Referees: Nikolić, Stojković (SRB)
26 April 2014; 20:15	3× (yellow card) 3× (suspension)	Report	3× (yellow card) 4× (suspension)	Palau Blaugrana, Barcelona; Attendance: 6,814; Referees: Nikolić, Stojković (SRB)

62–62 on aggregate. Barcelona won on away goals.

27 April 2014; 14:15	THW Kiel (Germany)	34–26	(North Macedonia) Metalurg Skopje	Sparkassen-Arena, Kiel; Attendance: 8,200; Referees: Stoļarovs, Līcis (LAT)
27 April 2014; 14:15	Klein 8	(19–11)	Vugrinec 7	Sparkassen-Arena, Kiel; Attendance: 8,200; Referees: Stoļarovs, Līcis (LAT)
27 April 2014; 14:15	2× (yellow card) 5× (suspension) 1× (red card)	Report	1× (yellow card) 7× (suspension) 2× (red card)	Sparkassen-Arena, Kiel; Attendance: 8,200; Referees: Stoļarovs, Līcis (LAT)

Kiel won 65–47 on aggregate.

== Final four ==
The draw was held on 29 April 2014.

=== Bracket ===
Semi-finals
31 May
(Spain) Barcelona	39
(Germany) Flensburg (pen.)	41
31 May
(Hungary) MKB-MVM Veszprém	26
(Germany) THW Kiel	29

Final
1 June
(Germany) Flensburg	30
(Germany) THW Kiel	28
Third place
1 June
(Spain) Barcelona	26
(Hungary) MKB-MVM Veszprém	25

==== Semifinals ====
31 May 2014; 15:15	MKB-MVM Veszprém (Hungary)	26–29	(Germany) THW Kiel	Lanxess Arena, Cologne; Attendance: 20,000; Referees: Krstić, Ljubić (SLO)
31 May 2014; 15:15	Ilić 5	(13–13)	Pálmarsson 7	Lanxess Arena, Cologne; Attendance: 20,000; Referees: Krstić, Ljubić (SLO)
31 May 2014; 15:15	3× (yellow card) 3× (suspension) 1× (red card)	Report	3× (yellow card) 6× (suspension)	Lanxess Arena, Cologne; Attendance: 20,000; Referees: Krstić, Ljubić (SLO)

31 May 2014
18:00
Barcelona (Spain)
39–41 (ET)
(Germany) Flensburg
Lanxess Arena, Cologne
Attendance: 20,000
Referees: Horáček, Novotný (CZE)
Lazarov, Tomás 6
(17–18)
Glandorf, Weinhold 8
3× (yellow card) 2× (suspension)
Report
3× (yellow card) 4× (suspension)

FT: 32–32 ET: 4–4

Flensburg won the penalty shootout 5–3.

==== Third place game ====
1 June 2014; 15:15	Barcelona (Spain)	26–25	(Hungary) MKB-MVM Veszprém	Lanxess Arena, Cologne; Attendance: 20,000; Referees: Gousko, Repkin (BLR)
1 June 2014; 15:15	Rutenka 11	(9–10)	Ilić 7	Lanxess Arena, Cologne; Attendance: 20,000; Referees: Gousko, Repkin (BLR)
1 June 2014; 15:15	3× (yellow card)	Report	3× (yellow card) 3× (suspension)	Lanxess Arena, Cologne; Attendance: 20,000; Referees: Gousko, Repkin (BLR)

==== Final ====
1 June 2014; 18:00	Flensburg (Germany)	30–28	(Germany) THW Kiel	Lanxess Arena, Cologne; Attendance: 20,000; Referees: Gjeding, Hansen (DEN)
1 June 2014; 18:00	Eggert, Svan 7	(14–16)	Pálmarsson 6	Lanxess Arena, Cologne; Attendance: 20,000; Referees: Gjeding, Hansen (DEN)
1 June 2014; 18:00	3× (yellow card) 5× (suspension)	Report	2× (yellow card) 2× (suspension)	Lanxess Arena, Cologne; Attendance: 20,000; Referees: Gjeding, Hansen (DEN)
