= Oskar Czertowicz =

Polish handball player (born 2006)

Personal information
- Nationality: Polish
- Born: 9 February 2006 (age 20) Kwidzyn, Poland
- Height: 1.91 m (6 ft 3 in)

Sport
- Sport: Handball
- Position: Centre back
- Current club: SG Flensburg-Handewitt
- Number: 19

Youth career
- Years: Team
- 2011–2021: HG Saarlouis
- 2021–2023: SG Flensburg-Handewitt

Senior clubs
- Years: Team
- 2023–: SG Flensburg-Handewitt

Oskar Czertowicz (born 9 February 2006) is a Polish handball player for SG Flensburg-Handewitt. Born in Poland, he moved with his family to Germany aged 4 when his father Lukasz signed a contract with Wilhelmshavener HV.

== Career ==
Czertowicz joined the youth team of Flensburg in 2021, displaying strong goalscoring abilities and made his debut for the senior team against Rhein-Neckar Löwen. During the 2023–24 season, he made more regular appearances, even scoring 5 goals in a EHF European League match against Kadetten Schaffhausen. He earned his first professional contract in December 2023.
