= Maik Machulla =

German handball player and coach (born 1977)

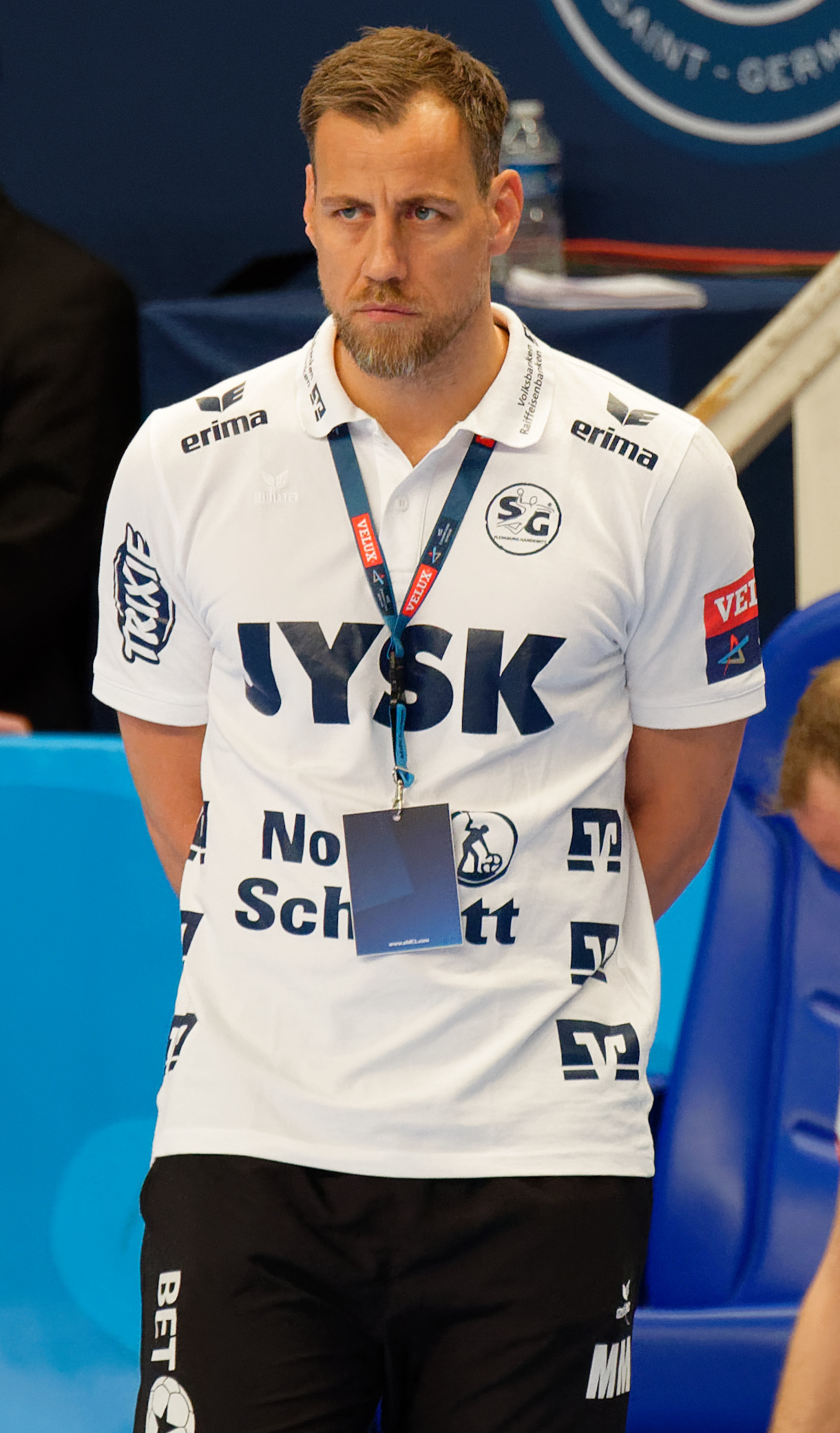
- Machulla in 2018

Personal information
- Nationality: German
- Born: 9 January 1977 (age 49) Greifswald, Germany
- Height: 1.89

Sport
- Sport: Handball
- Position: Centre back

Youth career
- Years: Team
- –1991: BSG Einheit Halle-Neustadt
- 1991–1997: SC Magdeburg

Senior clubs
- Years: Team
- 1997–2001: SC Magdeburg
- 2001–2002: SG Hameln
- 2002–2010: HSG Nordhorn-Lingen
- 2010–2011: HSG Ahlen-Hamm
- 2011–2012: ASV Hamm-Westfalen
- 2012–2014: SG Flensburg-Handewitt
- 2015: SG Flensburg-Handewitt
National team
- Years: Team
- 1998–: Germany

Teams managed
- 2009–2010: HSG Nordhorn-Lingen
- 2010–2011: ASV Hamm-Westfalen
- 2012–2017: SG Flensburg-Handewitt (assistant)
- 2017–2023: SG Flensburg-Handewitt
- 2024: Aalborg Håndbold

Maik Machulla (born 9 January 1977) is a German retired handball player and current handball coach.

In 2024 he was hired as the coach of the Danish club Aalborg Håndbold to replace Stefan Madsen. However, he was fired already in November in his first season. His replacement was his former assistant Simon Dahl.
