= Aksel Horgen =

Norwegian handball player (born 1996)

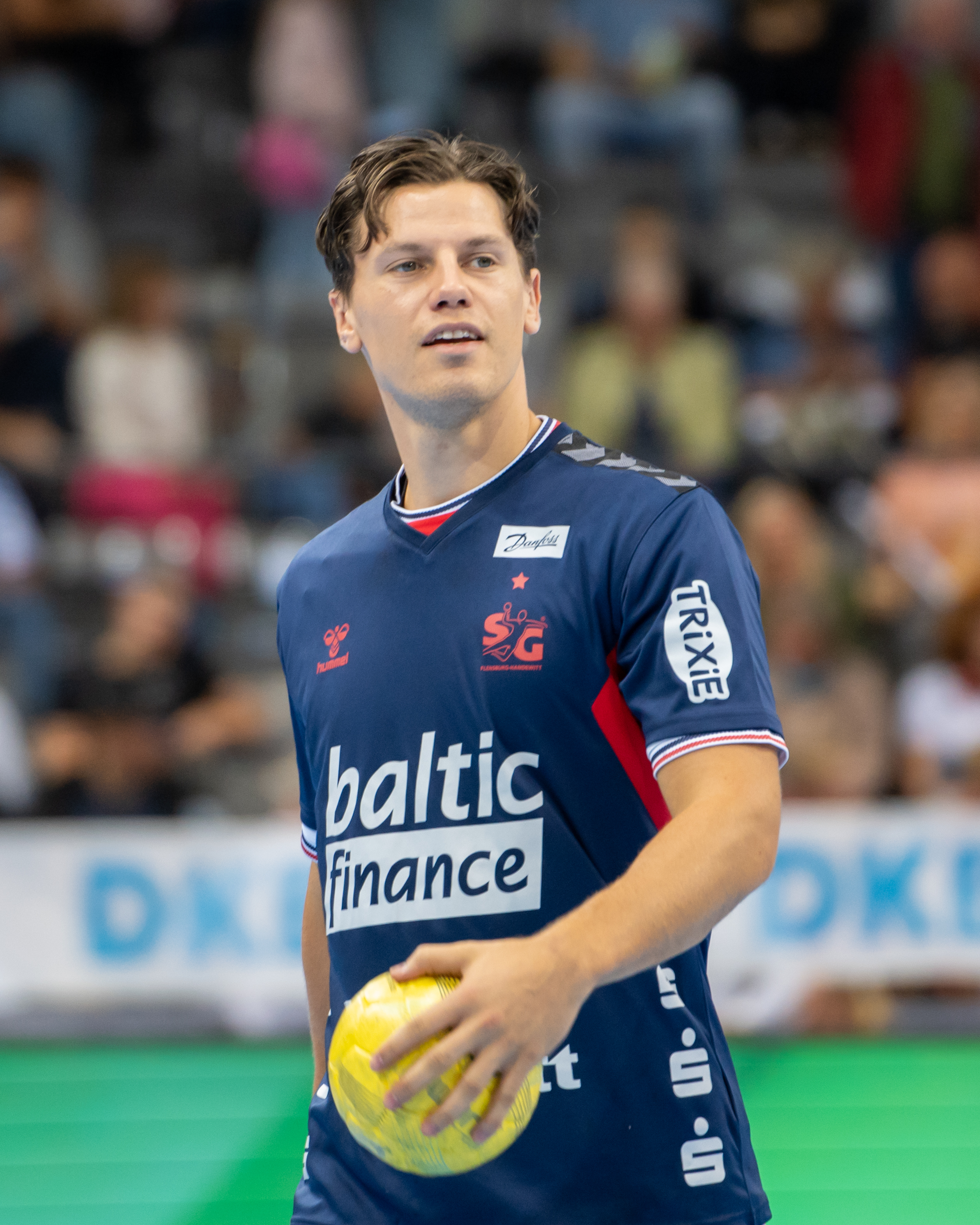

Personal information
- Nationality: Norwegian
- Born: 29 May 1996 (age 30) Oslo, Norway
- Height: 1.86 m (6 ft 1 in)

Sport
- Sport: Handball
- Position: Right wing
- Current club: SG Flensburg-Handewitt
- Number: 22

Senior clubs
- Years: Team
- 2013–2015: Follo HK
- 2015–2017: Haslum HK
- 2017–2020: Drammen HK
- 2020–2023: Bjerringbro-Silkeborg Håndbold
- 2023–: SG Flensburg-Handewitt
National team
| Years | Team | Apps | (Gls) |
| 2019– | Norway | 5 | (14) |

Aksel Horgen (born 29 May 1996) is a Norwegian handball player for SG Flensburg-Handewitt and the Norwegian national team.

== Individual awards ==
- All-Star Right Wing of Eliteserien: 2018/2019
- Best Player of Eliteserien: 2018/2019
