= Anton Lindskog =

Swedish handball player (born 1993)

Personal information
- Nationality: Swedish
- Born: 7 December 1993 (age 32)
- Height: 1.98 m (6 ft 6 in)

Sport
- Sport: Handball
- Position: Pivot
- Current club: GOG Håndbold

Senior clubs
- Years: Team
- 2010–2016: IFK Kristianstad
- 2016–2021: HSG Wetzlar
- 2021–2023: SG Flensburg-Handewitt
- 2023–: GOG Håndbold
National team
Years	Team	Apps	(Gls)
2013–	Sweden	29	(17)
Medal record
World Championship
Silver medal – second place	2021 Egypt
Men's Junior World Championship
Gold medal – first place	2013 Bosnia and Herzegovina
- Updated on 29 August 2023

Anton Lindskog (born 7 December 1993 in Kristianstad, Sweden) is a Swedish handball player for GOG Håndbold. He was part of the squad in the Swedish national team that won a silver medal in the World championship 2021 in Egypt.
