= Anders Zachariassen =

Danish handball player (born 1991)

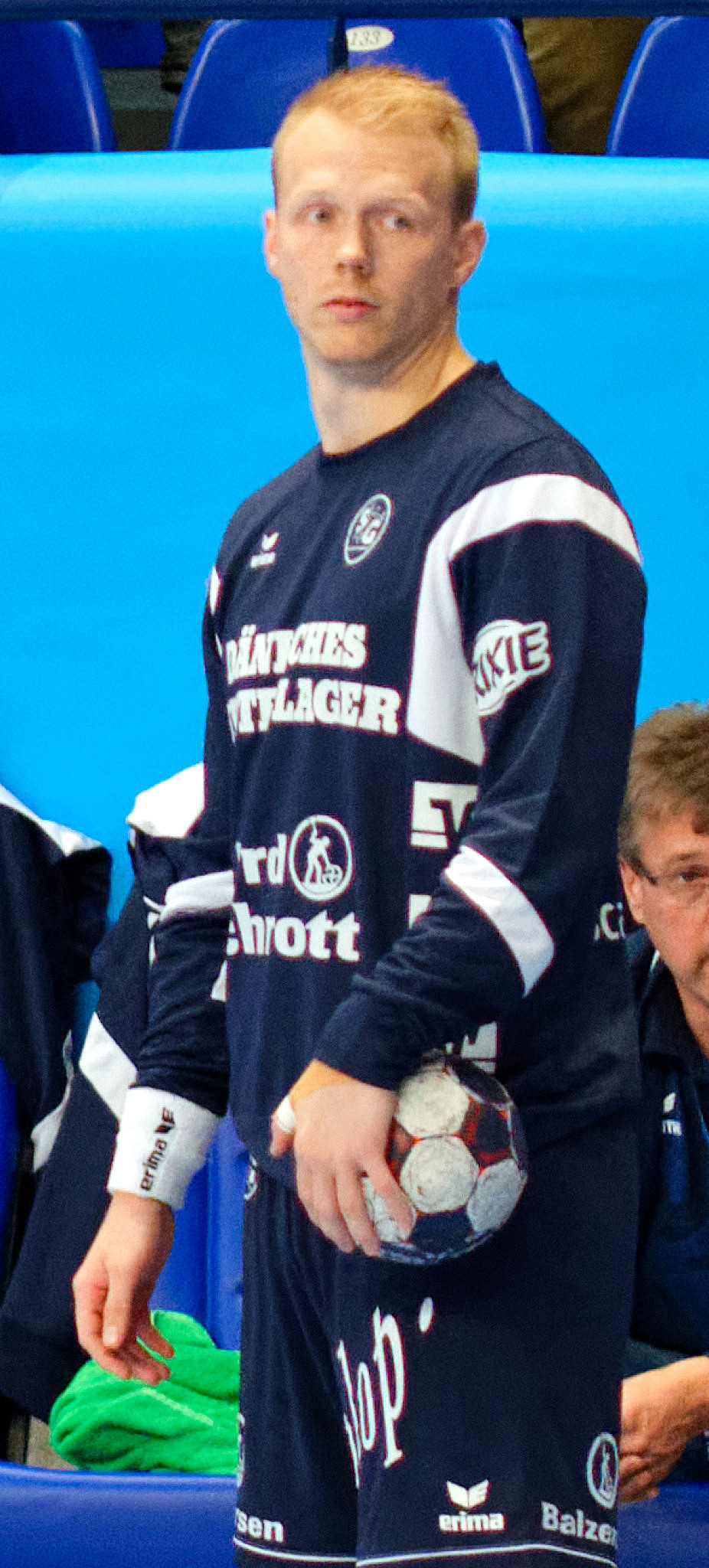

Personal information
- Nationality: Danish
- Born: 4 September 1991 (age 35) Sønderborg, Denmark
- Height: 1.92 m (6 ft 4 in)

Sport
- Sport: Handball
- Position: Pivot
- Current club: Bjerringbro-Silkeborg
- Number: 22

Youth career
- Years: Team
- –: Ulkebøl I&UF
- –: HF Sønderborg

Senior clubs
- Years: Team
- 2010–2014: SønderjyskE
- 2014–2020: SG Flensburg-Handewitt
- 2020–2024: GOG Håndbold
- 2024-: Bjerringbro-Silkeborg
National team
Years	Team	Apps	(Gls)
2015–	Denmark	65	(128)
Medal record
World Championship
Gold medal – first place	2019 Germany/Denmark
Gold medal – first place	2021 Egypt
Junior World Championship
Silver medal – second place	2011 Greece
- Updated on 7 August 2024

Anders Zachariassen (born 4 September 1991) is a Danish handball player for Bjerringbro-Silkeborg and the Danish national team.

He has previously played in Denmark for GOG Håndbold, SønderjyskE and in Germany for SG Flensburg-Handewitt.

== Career ==
Zachariassen started playing handball at Ulkebøl I&UF before joining HF Sønderborg and later SønderjyskE Håndbold in the Danish second tier. In 2011 he was promoted to the Herrehåndboldligaen. In the 2013-14 he was included in the league All-star team as the pivot.

In 2014 he joined German Bundesliga team SG Flensburg-Handewitt on a three-year deal to replace his compatriate Michael V. Knudsen on a three-year deal.

He was named Player of the Season by fans in his first season with SG Flensburg-Handewitt. With Flensburg he won the 2014-15 DHB-Pokal and the German Championship in 2018 and 2019.

In 2020 he returned to Denmark to join GOG Håndbold.

In 2019 he won the Danish Men's Handball Cup and was named MVP for the tournament. In 2022 and 2023 he won the Danish Championship, and in 2023 the Danish cup once again.

In 2024 he joined Bjerringbro-Silkeborg.

=== National team ===
Zachariassen debuted for the U21 Danish team on 11 March 2011, against Portugal. At the 2011 U21 World Championship he won silver medals with the Danish team.

At the 2019 and 2021 World Championships he won back-to-back World Championships. The 2019 were the first time Denmark won the title.
