= Arnar Freyr Arnarsson =

Icelandic handball player (born 1996)

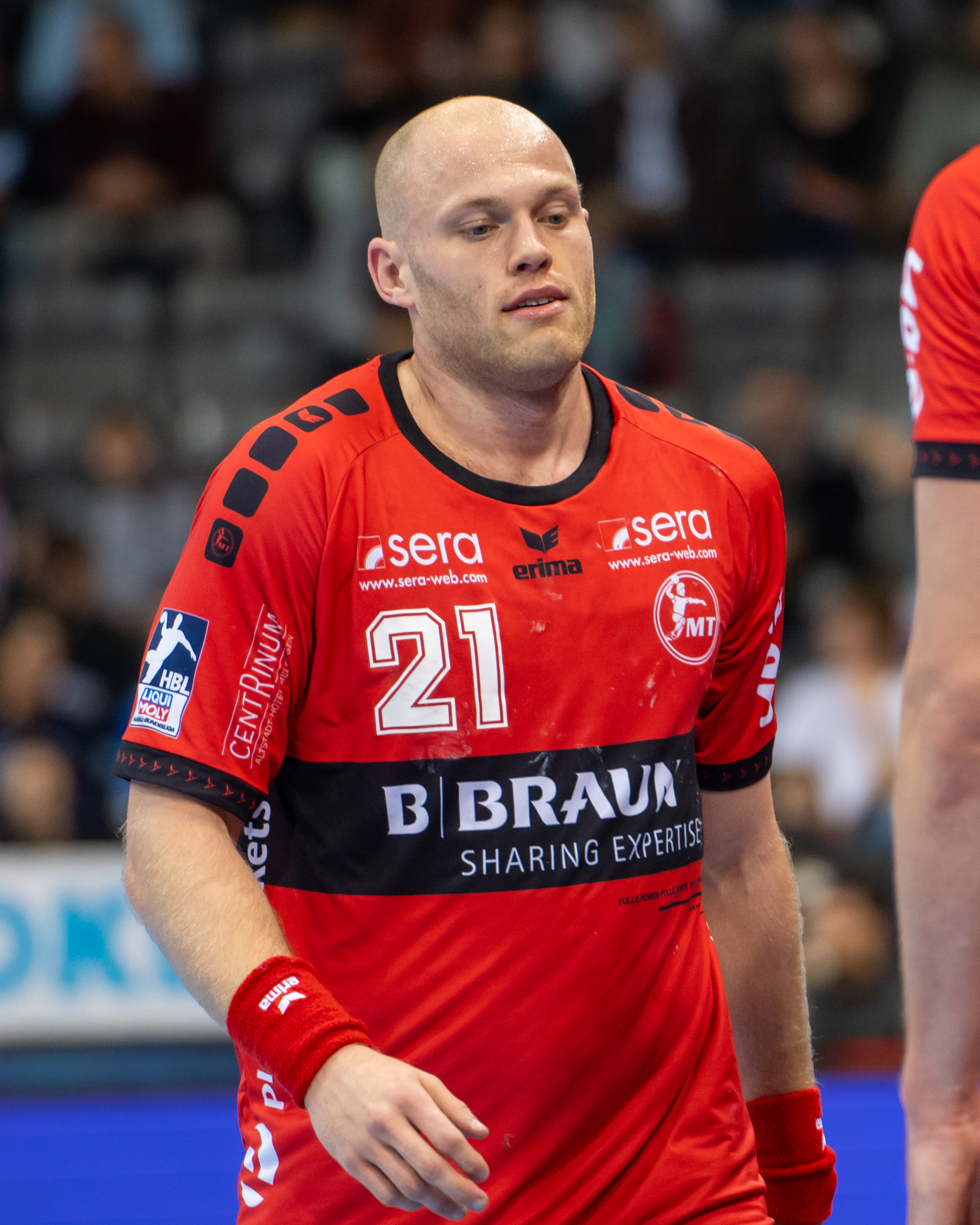

Personal information
- Nationality: Icelandic
- Born: 14 March 1996 (age 30) Reykjavík, Iceland
- Height: 2.01 m (6 ft 7 in)

Sport
- Sport: Handball
- Position: Pivot
- Current club: SG Flensburg-Handewitt
- Number: 21

Youth career
- Years: Team
- –2013: Fram

Senior clubs
- Years: Team
- 2013–2016: Fram
- 2016–2019: IFK Kristianstad
- 2019–2020: GOG Håndbold
- 2020–2026: MT Melsungen
- 2026–: SG Flensburg-Handewitt
National team
| Years | Team | Apps | (Gls) |
| 2015– | Iceland | 105 | (111) |
- Updated on 6 January 2026

Arnar Freyr Arnarsson (born 14 March 1996) is an Icelandic handball player for SG Flensburg-Handewitt and the Icelandic national team.

He participated at the 2017 and 2019 World Men's Handball Championships.

At the 2026 European Men's Handball Championship he finished 4th with Iceland, losing to Denmark in the semifinal and Croatia in the third-place playoff.
