= Patrick Volz =

German handball player (born 1999)

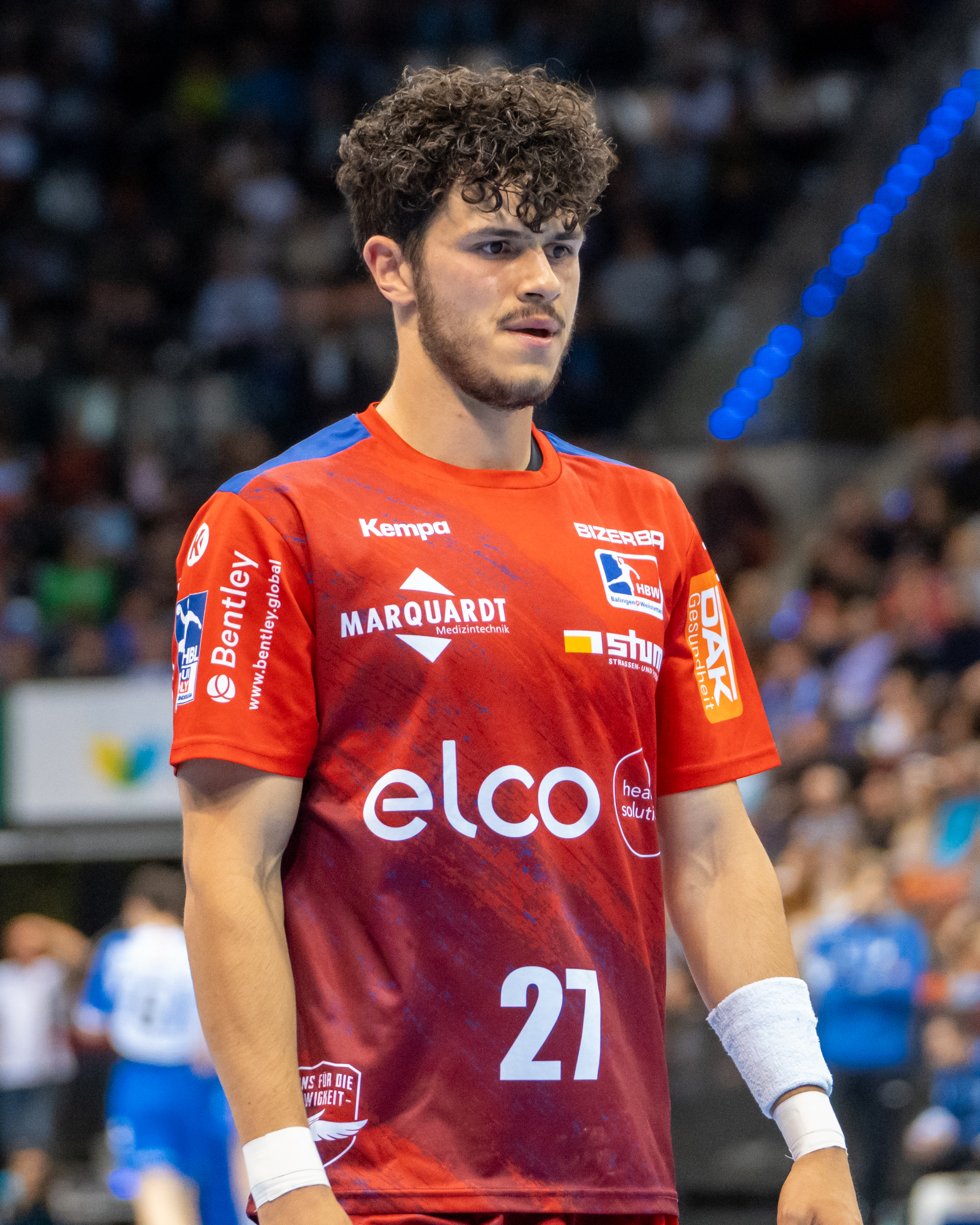

Personal information
- Nationality: German
- Born: 4 June 1999 (age 27) Germany
- Height: 1.91 m (6 ft 3 in)

Sport
- Sport: Handball
- Position: Left wing
- Current club: HBW Balingen-Weilstetten
- Number: 22

Youth career
- Years: Team
- 2014–2019: HSG Konstanz

Senior clubs
- Years: Team
- 2019–2021: HSG Konstanz
- 2021–2024: HBW Balingen-Weilstetten
- 2024–: SG Flensburg-Handewitt
- 2024–2025: SønderjyskE Herrehåndbold (loan)

Patrick Volz (born 4 June 1999) is a German handballer who plays as a left winger for SG Flensburg Handewitt.

== Career ==
Volz began his career at HSG Konstanz, but left for HBW Balingen-Weilstetten in 2021, earning an immediate place in their Bundesliga squad. He became a regular during the 2022-23 season, scoring 84 goals as HBW were promoted. It was announced in December 2023 that he would join SG Flensburg-Handewitt for the 2024-25 season, though he join the Danish club SønderjyskE Herrehåndbold on loan due to the two clubs' partnership. His contract with Flensburg will run until 2028.
