= Ljubomir Vranjes =

Swedish handball player (born 1973)

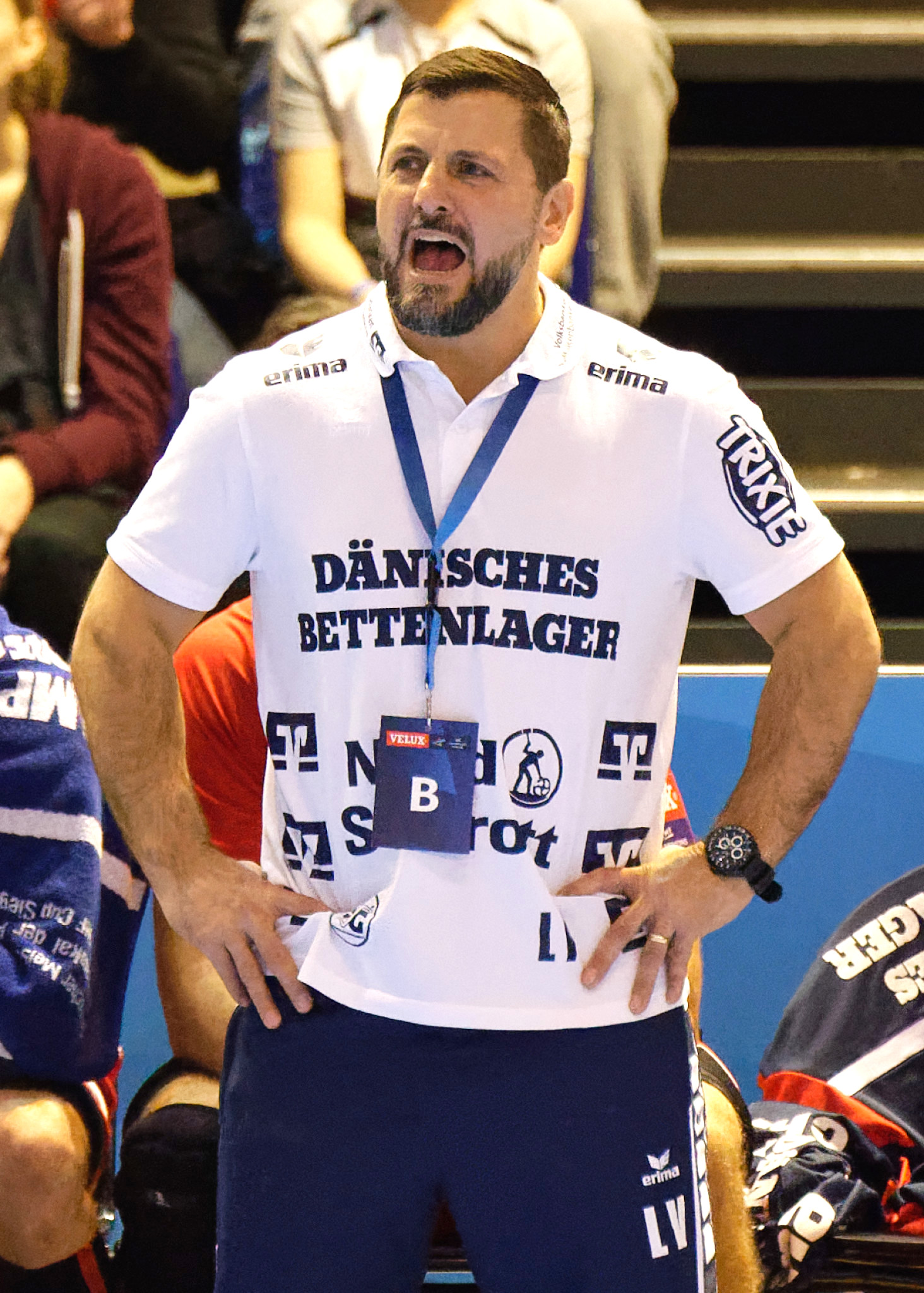
- Vranjes in March 2016

Personal information
- Nationality: Swedish
- Born: 3 October 1973 (age 53) Gothenburg, Sweden
- Height: 1.68 m (5 ft 6 in)

Sport
- Sport: Handball
- Position: Centre back
- Current club: SG Flensburg-Handewitt (sporting director)

Youth career
- Years: Team
- –1989: Kortedala IF
- 1989–1991: Redbergslids IK

Senior clubs
- Years: Team
- 1991–1999: Redbergslids IK
- 1999–2001: BM Granollers
- 2001–2006: HSG Nordhorn-Lingen
- 2006–2009: SG Flensburg-Handewitt
National team
Years	Team	Apps	(Gls)
1996–2007	Sweden	164	(451)

Teams managed
- 2010–2017: SG Flensburg-Handewitt
- 2013: Serbia
- 2017–2018: Telekom Veszprém
- 2017–2018: Hungary
- 2019–2020: IFK Kristianstad
- 2019–2022: Slovenia
- 2022: Rhein-Neckar Löwen
- 2022–2023: USAM Nîmes Gard
Medal record
Olympic Games
Silver medal – second place	2000 Sydney	Team
World Championship
Gold medal – first place	1999 Egypt
Silver medal – second place	1997 Japan
Silver medal – second place	2001 France
European Championship
Gold medal – first place	1998 Italy
Gold medal – first place	2000 Croatia
Gold medal – first place	2002 Sweden

Ljubomir Vranjes (born 3 October 1973) is a Swedish handball coach and former player who competed at the 2000 Summer Olympics. He is currently the sporting director of German team SG Flensburg-Handewitt.

In 1999 he was named Swedish Handballer of the Year, and in 2024 he was inducted into the EHF Hall of Fame.

== Career ==
=== Club ===
Vranjes played with Redbergslids IK for eight years, between 1991 and 1999, and has won five Swedish championship titles (1992–93, 1993–94, 1995–96, 1996–97, and 1997–98).

=== National team ===
Vranjes was a member of the Swedish national team for eleven years, between 1996 and 2007. With Sweden, he won the European Handball Championship three times (1998, 2000, and 2002), and the World Handball Championship once, in 1999. He also won the silver medal at the 2000 Summer Olympics.

=== Coaching ===
After retiring as a player in 2009, Vranjes became the manager of the German team Flensburg-Handewitt with whom he won the 2013–14 EHF Champions League. In 2013 he briefly coached the Serbia men's national handball team.

In 2017, he signed with Telekom Veszprém and the Hungary national team, taking over both positions on 1 July 2017.

On 17 December 2019, he took the head coach role of the Slovenia national team. He was sacked in January 2022 after failing to reach the main round of the 2022 European Men's Handball Championship.

On 19 January 2022, he was named the head coach of Handball-Bundesliga club Rhein-Neckar Löwen for the remainder of the season. In June 2022, he became the head coach of French side USAM Nîmes Gard.

== Personal life ==
Vranjes is of Serbian descent, and was born in Gothenburg.

== Honours ==
Player

- Swedish Championship:
  - Winner: 1993, 1994, 1996, 1997, 1998
  - Runner-up: 1995, 1999

Manager

- EHF Champions League:
  - Winner: 2014
