= Jacob Heinl =

German handball player (born 1986)

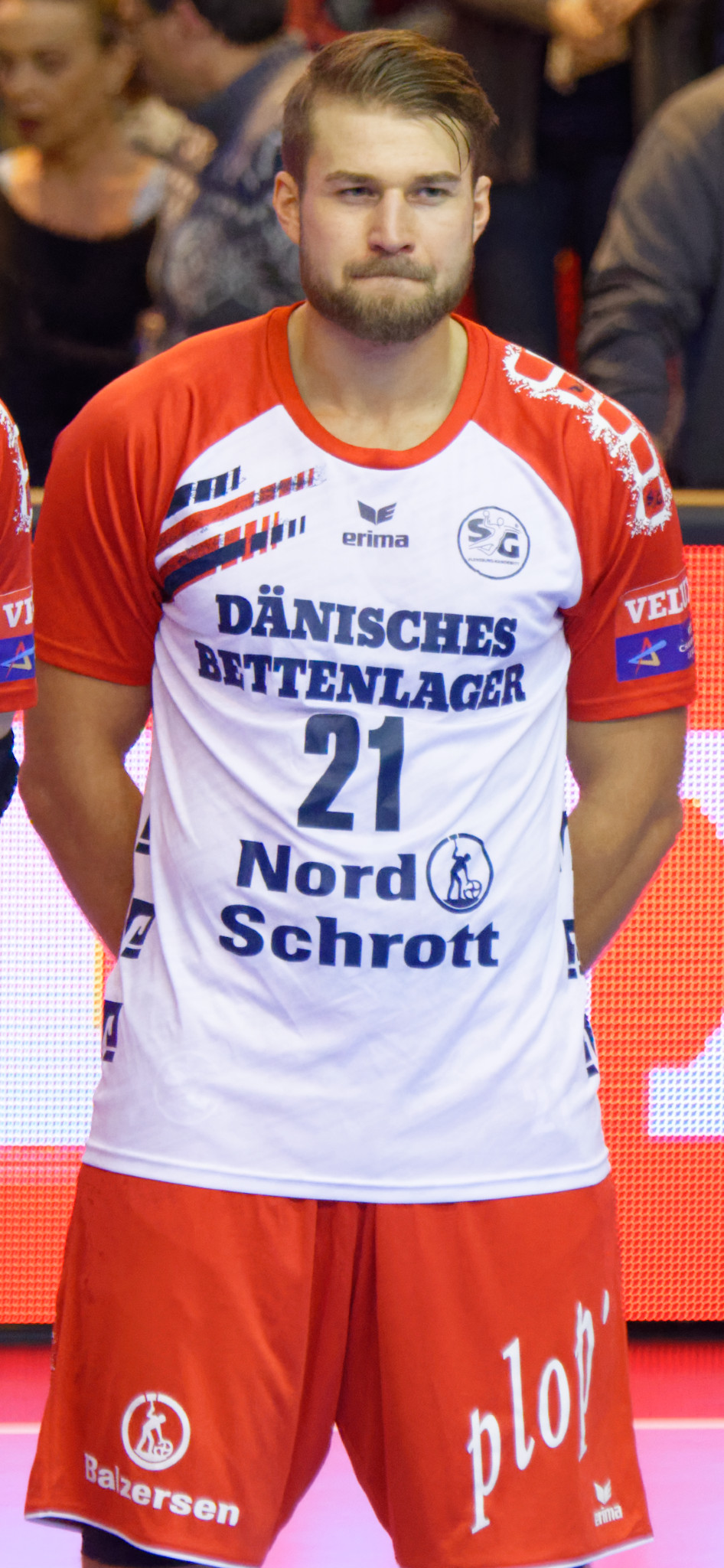

Personal information
- Nationality: German
- Born: 3 October 1986 (age 40) Hamburg, Germany
- Height: 1.93 m (6 ft 4 in)

Sport
- Sport: Handball
- Position: Pivot

Senior clubs
- Years: Team
- 2004–2008: SG Flensburg-Handewitt II
- 2008–2018: SG Flensburg-Handewitt
- 2018–2019: Ribe-Esbjerg HH
- 2019–2021: SG Flensburg-Handewitt
National team
Years	Team	Apps	(Gls)
2009–	Germany	28	(36)

Jacob Heinl (born 3 October 1986) is a German handball player for the German national team.
