= Domen Novak (handballer) =

Slovenian handball player (born 1998)

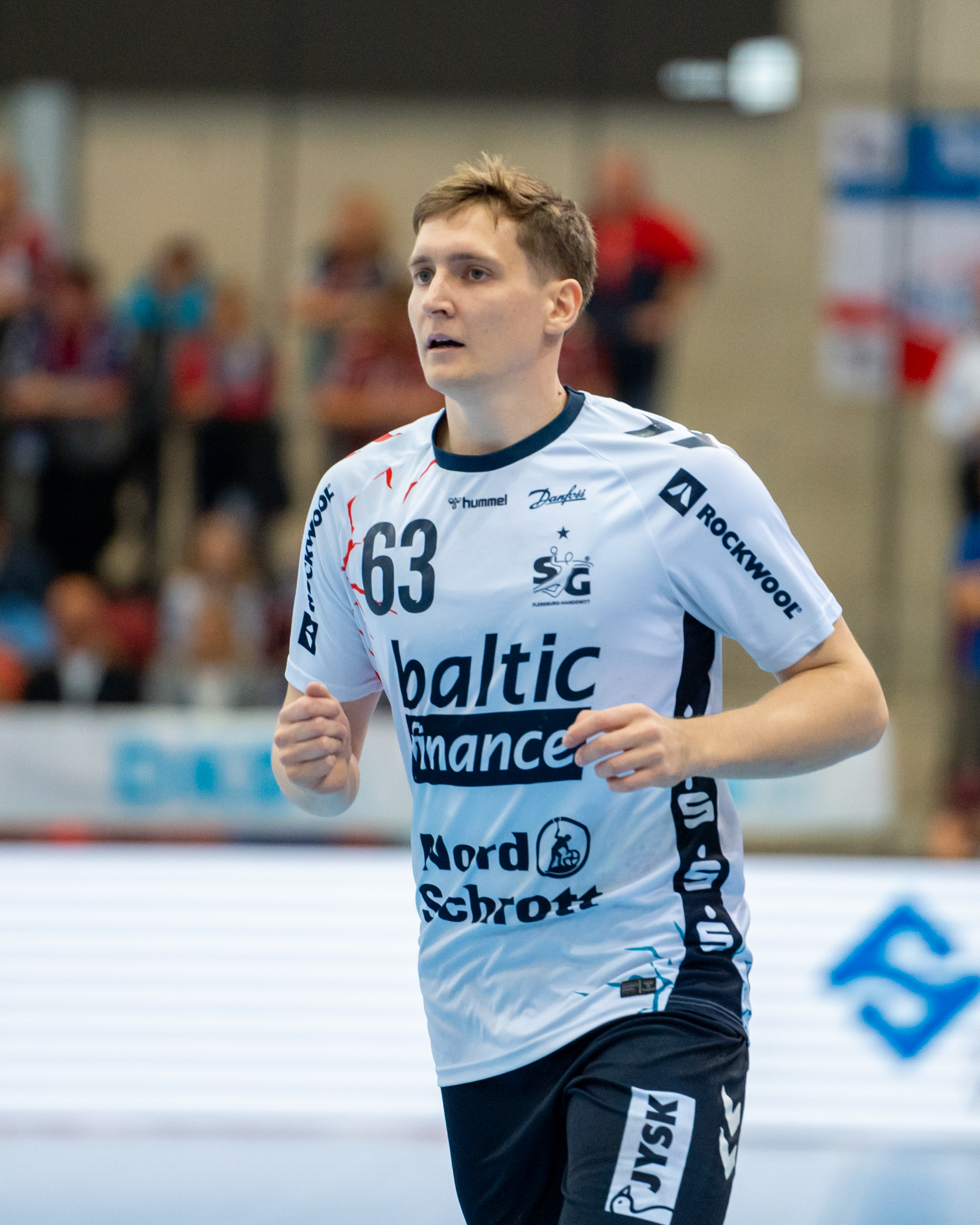
- Novak with SG Flensburg-Handewitt in 2025

Personal information
- Nationality: Slovenian
- Born: 26 April 1998 (age 28) Ljubljana, Slovenia
- Height: 1.81 m (5 ft 11 in)

Sport
- Sport: Handball
- Position: Right wing
- Current club: SG Flensburg-Handewitt
- Number: 63

Youth career
- Years: Team
- 2006–2015: ŠD RK Krim

Senior clubs
- Years: Team
- 2015–2017: ŠD RK Krim
- 2017–2018: RD Slovan
- 2018–2019: MRD Dobova
- 2019–2021: RK Celje
- 2021–2025: HSG Wetzlar
- 2025–: SG Flensburg-Handewitt
National team
Years	Team	Apps	(Gls)
–	Slovenia	63	(133)
- Updated on 24 January 2026

Domen Novak (born 26 April 1998) is a Slovenian handball player who plays as a right winger for SG Flensburg-Handewitt and the Slovenia national team.

== Career ==
Novak has represented Slovenia at the 2023 World Men's Handball Championship and the 2024 European Men's Handball Championship. At the latter, though he played a minor role in the tournament as a whole, he scored three goals in a victory over Denmark. At club level, he won the Slovenian First League in 2020 with RK Celje. He signed for HSG Wetzlar for the 2021–22 season as a replacement for Kristian Bjørnsen. On 3 October 2023, he scored nine goals as Wetzlar won 32–31 against THW Kiel in a DHB-Pokal match.
