= SG Flensburg-Handewitt =

German handball club

- Full name: Spielgemeinschaft Flensburg-Handewitt
- Short name: SGFH
- Founded: 1990; 36 years ago
- Arena: Flens-Arena, Flensburg
- Capacity: 6,300
- President: Holger Glandorf
- Head coach: Aleš Pajovič
- League: Handball-Bundesliga
- 2025–26: 3rd of 18
- Club colours
Home	Away

SG Flensburg-Handewitt is a professional handball club from Flensburg and Handewitt in Schleswig-Holstein, Germany. Currently, they compete in the Handball-Bundesliga and EHF European League. They play home matches at Flens-Arena. Since forming in 1990, the club has been one of Germany's most successful teams domestically and in European tournaments. The club is best known for winning the EHF Champions League in 2014 by defeating arch-rivals THW Kiel in the final 30–28.

Location of SG Flensburg-Handewitt

== History ==
SG Flensburg-Handewitt was created in 1990 following a merger of the handball divisions of TSB Flensburg and Handewitter SV. The first season of the club (1990–1991) took place in the 2. Handball-Bundesliga, with SG finishing in fourth position under Zvonimir Serdarušić. In 1992, they were promoted to the top division as SG Flensburg-Handewitt for the first time, winning every league fixture. In their first season in the top-flight, SG finished sixteenth, though they were spared relegation due to the liquidation of TSV Milbertshofen. The following year, under the leadership of Anders Dahl-Nielsen, SG finished fourth and from that point equalled that placement or better in each season until the 2008/09 season.

SG Flensburg-Handewitt acquired their first major trophy with the 1996/1997 EHF Cup by defeating Danish side Virum-Sorgenfri HK 52–42 on aggregate in the final. Three consecutive DHB-Pokal titles (2003/04 vs TUSEM Essen, 2004/05 vs HSV Hamburg, and 2005/06 vs THW Kiel) followed, as did success in the league, with a championship victory in the 2003/04 season: Flensburg defeated HSG Nordhorn-Lingen at Flens-Arena in round 33 to secure their very first title with a game to spare. Slovenian club RK Celje did, however, prevent a third trophy that year for SG by winning the 2003-04 EHF Champions League final against them. The 2004-05 and 2005-06 league campaigns both saw Flensburg finish second behind THW Kiel. In 2007, SG once again lost the Champions League final, this time they were defeated by "Landesderby" rivals Kiel.

In 2010, former player Ljubomir Vranjes became the new coach and it was under him that SG Flensburg-Handewitt won the EHF Champions League final at their third attempt, beating Kiel 30–28 at the Lanxess Arena in Cologne. During Vranjes' time as coach of SG, they also won the DHB-Pokal for a fourth time, beating SC Magdeburg on penalties. Maik Machulla took over from Vranjes as head coach in 2017, and consecutive league titles (their second and third successes) followed in the 2017/18 and 2018/2019 campaigns. The 2017/18 title was secured on the final day of the season with a 22–21 victory over Frisch Auf Göppingen. The following year, SG once again took the title on the final day, winning 27–24 away at Bergischer HC. Machulla was sacked in April 2023 after Flensburg lost three vital matches in just eight days: They were defeated 38–31 by Rhein-Neckar Löwen in the DHB-Pokal semi-finals, 35–27 at Flens-Arena by BM Granollers in the EHF European League quarter-finals, and then 29–19 by THW Kiel in the Nordderby in a crucial Handball-Bundesliga game. In the 2023-24 season with Nicolej Krickau as head coach, Flensburg missed out on qualification for the 2024-25 EHF Champions League by finishing 3rd in the Handball-Bundesliga. They were also defeated in the semi-finals of the DHB-Pokal by MT Melsungen, though they were victorious in the 2023-24 EHF European League final, defeating Füchse Berlin.

SG Flensburg-Handewitt holds a reputation as being a perennial "second-place" club – while winning three league titles the team has also finished runner-up fourteen times. In addition to this, they reached each of the seven DHB-Pokal finals between 2011 and 2017, losing six of them. The club has, however, won all the competitions it has participated in at least once except the IHF Super Globe, and it is the only club to have won four different European Cups (one EHF Champions League, two EHF Cup Winners' Cup, two EHF European League titles and one EHF European Cup in addition to several finals), as well as the three different German national competitions (three German championships, four DHB-Pokal and three DHB-Supercup).

Due to their proximity to Scandinavia, SG typically have top international players from Denmark, Sweden and Norway in their squad. Danish right winger Lasse Svan became the club's all-time leading appearance maker during the 2021/22 season (627 matches), overtaking legendary left winger and fellow Dane Lars Christiansen. At the 2023 World Men's Handball Championship, the victorious Danish squad featured six Flensburg players.

== Club information ==
=== Kit manufacturers ===
Period	Kit manufacturer
–2013	(Denmark) Hummel
2013–2023	(Germany) Erima
2023–	(Denmark) Hummel

=== Kits ===
HOME
2017–18	2018–19	2021–

AWAY
2017–18	2019–20	2021–

THIRD
2018–19	2019–20

=== Supporters ===
There are four official fan clubs of SG Flensburg-Handewitt. The largest is called "Hölle Nord" (Hell North). The other three are called "Die Wikinger" (The Vikings), "Nordlichter" (Northern Lights) and the "Alte Garde" (The Old Guard). Club songs include "Hier regiert Flensburg-Handewitt" by Andreas Fahnert and "Unvergleichliches".

=== Cooperations ===
SG Flensburg-Handewitt have sporting partnerships with SønderjyskE Herrehåndbold, VfL Lübeck-Schwartau, Lugi Handboll, DHK Flensborg and Flensburg Academy.

=== Rivalries ===
The main rival of SG Flensburg-Handewitt is fellow Schleswig-Holstein side THW Kiel. The two clubs compete in the "Nordderby" and have regularly and closely fought for national championships and in finals of the DHB-Pokal. As of March 2025, 114 matches have been contested between the two sides, with THW winning 67 and SG with 42 victories.

The other rival of SG is HSV Hamburg. Due to HSV's financial issues and subsequent license removal, Flensburg and Hamburg did not play each other for more than five years until the rivalry was renewed in October 2021 when SG won 33–27 in Hamburg.

=== Attendances ===
Season	Average
2011–2012	5,622
2012–2013	5,553
2013–2014	5,680
2014–2015	5,819
2015–2016	6,026
2016–2017	6,088
2017–2018	5,984
2018–2019	6,060
2019–2020	6,019
2020–2021	382
2021–2022	3,710
2022–2023	5,864
2023–2024	6,183
2024–2025	6,260

Flensburg first played at Wikinghalle, which was built in 1975. They last played there in 1995, having moved to the Fördehalle in 1991. The Flens-Arena has been the home court of the club since its completion in 2001. In April 2023, the naming rights for the arena became free, as the agreement with local brewery Flensburger Brauerei ended. Since 2026, the venue has been called the GGW Arena.

== Accomplishments ==
- Handball-Bundesliga:
  - Gold: 2004, 2018, 2019
  - Silver: 1996, 1997, 1999, 2000, 2003, 2005, 2006, 2008, 2012, 2013, 2016, 2017, 2020, 2021
- 2. Handball-Bundesliga:
  - Gold: 1988, 1992
- DHB-Pokal:
  - Gold: 2003, 2004, 2005, 2015
  - Silver: 1992, 1994, 2000, 2011, 2012, 2013, 2014, 2016, 2017
- DHB-Supercup:
  - Gold: 2000, 2013, 2019
  - Silver: 1997, 2003, 2004, 2005, 2012, 2015, 2018, 2020
- EHF Champions League:
  - Gold: 2014
  - Silver: 2004, 2007
  - Bronze: 2006
- EHF Cup Winners' Cup:
  - Gold: 2001, 2012
  - Silver: 2002
- EHF Cup / EHF European League:
  - Gold: 1997, 2024, 2025
  - Silver: 1998, 2000
  - Bronze: 2026
- EHF City Cup:
  - Gold: 1999
- IHF Super Globe:
  - Bronze: 2014
- Double

Winners: 2003–04

=== Final performances ===
Season	Competition	Opponent	Score
1991–92	DHB-Pokal	(Germany) TUSEM Essen	20–19 19–20 4–5 (P)
1993–94	DHB-Pokal	(Germany) SG Wallau-Massenheim	14–17
1996–97	EHF Cup	(Denmark) Virum-Sorgenfri HK	22–25 30–17
1997–98	DHB-Supercup	(Germany) TBV Lemgo	33–35
1997–98	EHF Cup	(Germany) THW Kiel	25–23 21–26
1998–99	EHF City Cup	(Spain) BM Ciudad Real	27–27 26–21
1999–00	DHB-Pokal	(Germany) THW Kiel	25–30
1999–00	EHF Cup	(Croatia) RK Metković	22–24 25–23
2000–01	DHB-Supercup	(Germany) THW Kiel	20–19
2000–01	EHF Cup Winners' Cup	(Spain) CB Ademar León	32–25 19–24
2001–02	EHF Cup Winners' Cup	(Spain) BM Ciudad Real	22–31 32–27
2002–03	DHB-Pokal	(Germany) TUSEM Essen	31–30
2003–04	DHB-Supercup	(Germany) TBV Lemgo	28–32
2003–04	DHB-Pokal	(Germany) HSV Hamburg	29–23
2003–04	EHF Champions League	(Slovenia) RK Celje	28–34 30–28
2004–05	DHB-Supercup	(Germany) HSV Hamburg	24–25
2004–05	DHB-Pokal	(Germany) THW Kiel	33–31
2005–06	DHB-Supercup	(Germany) THW Kiel	34–36
2006–07	EHF Champions League	(Germany) THW Kiel	28–28 27–29
2010–11	DHB-Pokal	(Germany) THW Kiel	24–30
2011–12	DHB-Pokal	(Germany) THW Kiel	31–33
2011–12	EHF Cup Winners' Cup	(Germany) VfL Gummersbach	34–33 32–28
2012–13	DHB-Supercup	(Germany) THW Kiel	26–29
2012–13	DHB-Pokal	(Germany) THW Kiel	30–33
2013–14	DHB-Supercup	(Germany) THW Kiel	29–26
2013–14	DHB-Pokal	(Germany) Füchse Berlin	21–22
2013–14	EHF Champions League	(Germany) THW Kiel	30–28
2014–15	DHB-Pokal	(Germany) SC Magdeburg	27–27 5–4 (P)
2015–16	DHB-Supercup	(Germany) THW Kiel	26–27
2015–16	DHB-Pokal	(Germany) SC Magdeburg	30–32
2016–17	DHB-Pokal	(Germany) THW Kiel	23–29
2018–19	DHB-Supercup	(Germany) Rhein-Neckar Löwen	26–33
2019–20	DHB-Supercup	(Germany) THW Kiel	32–31
2020–21	DHB-Supercup	(Germany) THW Kiel	24–28
2023–24	EHF European League	(Germany) Füchse Berlin	36–31
2024–25	EHF European League	(France) Montpellier Handball	32–25

== Team ==
=== Current squad ===
Squad for the 2026–27 season

Goalkeepers

- 1 (Bosnia and Herzegovina) Benjamin Burić
- 16 (Romania) Cătălin Haidu
- 30 (Sweden) Simon Möller

Left wingers

- 28 (Germany) Patrick Volz
- 31 (Denmark) Emil Jakobsen

Right wingers

- 27 (Norway) Aksel Horgen
- 63 (Slovenia) Domen Novak

Line players

- 14 (Denmark) Emil Bergholt
- 18 (Germany) Moritz Detlefsen
- 41 (Iceland) Arnar Freyr Arnarsson
- 43 (Slovenia) Blaž Blagotinšek

Left backs

- 2 (Denmark) Simon Pytlick
- 17 (Germany) Marko Grgić
- 64 (Denmark) Lasse Møller

Centre backs

- 44 (France) Aymeric Minne
- 77 (Germany) Luca Witzke

Right backs

- 5 (Denmark) Niclas Kirkeløkke
- 23 (Norway) Kent Robin Tønnesen

=== Technical staff ===
- Head coach: (Slovenia) Aleš Pajovič
- Assistant coach: (Denmark) Anders Eggert
- Sporting director: (Sweden) Ljubomir Vranjes
- Athletic Trainer: (Germany) Michael Döring
- Physiotherapist: (Germany) Torben Helmer
- Club doctor: (Germany) Thorsten Lange

=== Transfers ===
Transfers for the 2027–28 season

Joining

- (Denmark) Victor Kløve (LB) (from (Germany) Frisch Auf Göppingen)
- (Portugal) Martim Costa (LB) (from (Portugal) Sporting CP)
- (Iceland) Viggó Kristjánsson (RB) (from (Germany) HC Erlangen)
- (Portugal) Francisco Costa (RB) (from (Portugal) Sporting CP)

Leaving

- (Denmark) Simon Pytlick (LB) (to (Germany) Füchse Berlin)
- (Denmark) Niclas Kirkeløkke (RB) (to (Denmark) Fredericia HK)

=== Transfer History ===
Transfers for the 2026–27 season

Joining

- (Sweden) Simon Möller (GK) from (France) Fenix Toulouse
- (France) Aymeric Minne (CB) from (France) HBC Nantes
- (Denmark) Emil Bergholt (LP) from (Denmark) Skjern Håndbold
- (Iceland) Arnar Freyr Arnarsson (LP) from (Germany) MT Melsungen

Leaving

- (Denmark) Lukas Jørgensen (LP) to (Hungary) ONE Veszprém
- (Denmark) Kevin Møller (GK) to (Denmark) GOG Håndbold
- (Bosnia and Herzegovina) Adin Faljić (LP) to (Germany) TUSEM Essen
- (Germany) Johannes Golla (LP) to (Germany) MT Melsungen
- (Germany) Thilo Knutzen (LB) on loan at (Sweden) HK Malmö

Transfers for the 2025–26 season

Joining

- (Slovenia) Domen Novak (RW) from (Germany) HSG Wetzlar
- (Norway) Kent Robin Tønnesen (RB) from (France) Paris Saint-Germain
- (Germany) Marko Grgić (LB) 'from (Germany) ThSV Eisenach
- (Germany) Luca Witzke (CB) from (Germany) DHfK Leipzig
- (Germany) Patrick Volz (LW) back from loan at (Denmark) SønderjyskE Herrehåndbold
- (Bosnia and Herzegovina) Adin Faljić (LP) from (Croatia) RK Zagreb

Leaving

- (Sweden) Jim Gottfridsson (CB) to (Hungary) OTP Bank-Pick Szeged
- (Denmark) Mads Mensah Larsen (CB) to (Denmark) Skjern Håndbold
- (Denmark) Jóhan Hansen (RW) to (Denmark) Skanderborg AGF Håndbold
- (Norway) August Pedersen (LW) to (Germany) TSV Hannover-Burgdorf
- (Poland) Oskar Czertowicz (CB) to (Poland) Wybrzeże Gdańsk
- (Netherlands) Kay Smits (RB) to (Germany) VfL Gummersbach
- (Croatia) Marko Kopljar (RB) (retires)

Transfers for the 2024–25 season

Joining

- (Germany) Patrick Volz (LW) from (Germany) HBW Balingen-Weilstetten
- (Denmark) Niclas Kirkeløkke (RB) (from (Germany) Rhein-Neckar Löwen)
- (Croatia) Marko Kopljar (RB)
- (Denmark) Andreas Holst Jensen (LB)
- (Denmark) Anders Eggert (assistant coach) (from (Denmark) KIF Kolding)

Leaving

- (Germany) Patrick Volz (LW) on loan at (Denmark) SønderjyskE Herrehåndbold
- (Iceland) Teitur Örn Einarsson (RB) (to (Germany) VfL Gummersbach)
- (Austria) Boris Zivkovic (RB) (to (Kuwait) Al-Qurain SC)
- (Poland) Oskar Czertowicz (CB) (to (Germany) DHK Flensborg) (loan)
- (Netherlands) Mark Bult (assistant coach) (to (Germany) HSG Nordhorn-Lingen) (to be head coach)

Transfers for the 2023–24 season

Joining

- (Denmark) Nicolej Krickau (head coach) (from (Denmark) GOG Håndbold)
- (Denmark) Simon Pytlick (LB) (from (Denmark) GOG Håndbold)
- (Netherlands) Kay Smits (RB) (from (Germany) SC Magdeburg)
- (Norway) Aksel Horgen (RW) (from (Denmark) Bjerringbro-Silkeborg)
- (Slovenia) Blaž Blagotinšek (P) (from (Germany) Frisch Auf Göppingen)
- (Denmark) Lukas Jørgensen (P) (from (Denmark) GOG Håndbold)
- (Poland) Oskar Czertowicz (CB) (from own youth)
- (Austria) Boris Zivkovic (RB) (from (Poland) KS Azoty-Puławy) (February 2024)

Leaving

- (Denmark) Aaron Mensing (LB) (to (Denmark) GOG Håndbold)
- (Norway) Gøran Johannessen (CB) (to (Norway) Kolstad Håndball)
- (Norway) Magnus Abelvik Rød (RB) (to (Norway) Kolstad Håndball)
- (Germany) Franz Semper (RB) (to (Germany) DHfK Leipzig)
- (Germany) Leon Kirschberger (RW) (to (Germany) SC Magdeburg II)
- (Denmark) Simon Hald (P) (to (Denmark) Aalborg Håndbold)
- (Sweden) Anton Lindskog (P) (to (Denmark) GOG Håndbold)

Transfers for the 2022–23 season

Joining

- (Norway) August Pedersen (LW) (from (Norway) Drammen HK)
- (Denmark) Jóhan Hansen (RW) (from (Germany) TSV Hannover-Burgdorf)

Leaving

- (Sweden) Hampus Wanne (LW) (to (Spain) FC Barcelona)
- (Denmark) Lasse Svan Hansen (RW) (retires)
- (Germany) Marius Steinhauser (RW) (to (Germany) TSV Hannover-Burgdorf)
- (Germany) Felix Backhaus (GK) (to (Germany) TSV Hannover-Burgdorf)
- (Sweden) Mikael Helmersson (LB) (to (Sweden) Ystads IF)
- (Germany) Torben Hübke (P) (to (Germany) ThSV Eisenach)
- (Germany) Fynn Jaril Hasenkamp (LB) (to (Germany) TBV Lemgo)
- (Finland) Edward Hammarberg (CB) (to (Germany) HG Oftersheim/Schwetzingen)

Transfers for the 2021–22 season

Joining

- (Denmark) Kevin Møller (GK) (from (Spain) FC Barcelona Lassa)
- (Denmark) Emil Jakobsen (LW) (from (Denmark) GOG Håndbold)
- (Denmark) Aaron Mensing (LB) (from (Denmark) TTH Holstebro)
- (Sweden) Anton Lindskog (P) (from (Germany) HSG Wetzlar)
- (Iceland) Teitur Örn Einarsson (RB) (from (Sweden) IFK Kristianstad)
- (Germany) Julius Meyer-Siebert (RB) (on loan from (Germany) SC DHfK Leipzig)

Leaving

- (Norway) Torbjørn Bergerud (GK) (to (Denmark) GOG Håndbold)
- (Norway) Magnus Jøndal (LW) (retires)
- (Iceland) Alexander Petersson (RB) (to (Germany) MT Melsungen)
- (Germany) Jacob Heinl (P)

Transfers for the 2020–21 season

Joining

- (Denmark) Lasse Møller (LB) (from (Denmark) GOG Håndbold)
- (Denmark) Mads Mensah Larsen (LB) (from (Germany) Rhein-Neckar Löwen)
- (Germany) Franz Semper (RB) (from (Germany) SC DHfK Leipzig)

Leaving

- (Sweden) Simon Jeppsson (LB) (to (Germany) HC Erlangen)
- (Poland) Michał Jurecki (LB) (to (Poland) KS Azoty-Puławy)
- (Germany) Holger Glandorf (RB) (retires)
- (Germany) Jens Schöngarth (RB) (end of loan (Germany) Handball Sport Verein Hamburg)
- (Denmark) Anders Zachariassen (P) (to (Denmark) GOG Håndbold)

== Domestic competition ==
Season	Tier	Division	Pos.	W	D	L	Pts.
1990–91	2	2. Handball-Bundesliga	4th	14	4	8	32
1991–92	2	2. Handball-Bundesliga	1st	26	0	0	52
1992–93	1	Handball-Bundesliga	16th	12	5	17	29
1993–94	1	Handball-Bundesliga	4th	18	4	12	40
1994–95	1	Handball-Bundesliga	4th	16	5	9	37
1995–96	1	Handball-Bundesliga	2nd	19	4	7	42
1996–97	1	Handball-Bundesliga	2nd	20	1	9	41
1997–98	1	Handball-Bundesliga	4th	16	2	8	34
1998–99	1	Handball-Bundesliga	2nd	21	4	5	46
1999-00	1	Handball-Bundesliga	2nd	25	2	7	52
2000–01	1	Handball-Bundesliga	3rd	26	6	6	58
2001–02	1	Handball-Bundesliga	4th	21	4	9	46
2002–03	1	Handball-Bundesliga	2nd	28	1	5	57
2003–04	1	Handball-Bundesliga	1st	28	2	4	58
2004–05	1	Handball-Bundesliga	2nd	29	2	3	60
2005–06	1	Handball-Bundesliga	2nd	26	3	5	55
2006–07	1	Handball-Bundesliga	3rd	25	1	8	51
2007–08	1	Handball-Bundesliga	2nd	26	2	6	54
2008–09	1	Handball-Bundesliga	5th	21	2	11	44
2009–10	1	Handball-Bundesliga	3rd	27	0	7	54
2010–11	1	Handball-Bundesliga	6th	21	2	11	44
2011–12	1	Handball-Bundesliga	2nd	28	1	5	57
2012–13	1	Handball-Bundesliga	2nd	25	5	4	55
2013–14	1	Handball-Bundesliga	3rd	26	2	6	54
2014–15	1	Handball-Bundesliga	3rd	24	6	6	54
2015–16	1	Handball-Bundesliga	2nd	26	3	3	55
2016–17	1	Handball-Bundesliga	2nd	28	2	4	58
2017–18	1	Handball-Bundesliga	1st	27	2	5	56
2018–19	1	Handball-Bundesliga	1st	32	0	2	64
2019–20	1	Handball-Bundesliga	2nd	20	2	5	1.556^{a}
2020–21	1	Handball-Bundesliga	2nd	32	4	2	66
2021–22	1	Handball-Bundesliga	4th	22	6	6	50
2022–23	1	Handball-Bundesliga	4th	23	3	8	49
2023–24	1	Handball-Bundesliga	3rd	23	4	7	50
2024–25	1	Handball-Bundesliga	5th	21	5	8	47
2025–26	1	Handball-Bundesliga	3rd	24	3	7	51

^{a}Due to the COVID-19 pandemic, the final table was decided on a points-per-match basis.

== European competitions ==
Season	Competition	Round	Club	Home	Away	Aggregate
2013–14	EHF Champions League	Group matches (Group D)	(Germany) HSV Hamburg	27–24	27–32	2nd place
2013–14	EHF Champions League	Group matches (Group D)	(Slovenia) Velenje	35–31	28–23	2nd place
2013–14	EHF Champions League	Group matches (Group D)	(Denmark) Aalborg	31–27	27–26	2nd place
2013–14	EHF Champions League	Group matches (Group D)	(Spain) La Rioja	37–25	32–32	2nd place
2013–14	EHF Champions League	Group matches (Group D)	(Sweden) HK Drott	33–25	37–27	2nd place
2013–14	EHF Champions League	Quarter-finals	(North Macedonia) Vardar	24–22	25–27	49–49
2013–14	EHF Champions League	Semi-final (F4)	(Spain) Barcelona	41–39 (penalties)		
2013–14	EHF Champions League	Final (F4)	(Germany) THW Kiel	30–28		

Season	Competition	Round	Club	Home	Away	Aggregate
2014–15	EHF Champions League	Group matches (Group B)	(Spain) FC Barcelona	33–37	27–36	4th place
2014–15	EHF Champions League	Group matches (Group B)	(Denmark) KIF Kolding København	27–20	21–35	4th place
2014–15	EHF Champions League	Group matches (Group B)	(Poland) Wisła Płock	35–28	29–31	4th place
2014–15	EHF Champions League	Group matches (Group B)	(Sweden) Alingsås HK	31–21	27–22	4th place
2014–15	EHF Champions League	Group matches (Group B)	(Turkey) Beşiktaş	31–27	27–20	4th place
2014–15	EHF Champions League	Last 16	(Germany) THW Kiel	21–30	28–33	49–63

Season	Competition	Round	Club	Home	Away	Aggregate
2015–16	EHF Champions League	Group matches (Group A)	(France) Paris Saint-Germain	39–32	32–35	3rd place
2015–16	EHF Champions League	Group matches (Group A)	(Hungary) MVM Veszprém	28–29	24–28	3rd place
2015–16	EHF Champions League	Group matches (Group A)	(Germany) THW Kiel	37–27	23–27	3rd place
2015–16	EHF Champions League	Group matches (Group A)	(Croatia) Zagreb	28–27	30–23	3rd place
2015–16	EHF Champions League	Group matches (Group A)	(Poland) Wisła Płock	27–25	34–30	3rd place
2015–16	EHF Champions League	Group matches (Group A)	(Slovenia) Celje	30–20	30–26	3rd place
2015–16	EHF Champions League	Group matches (Group A)	(Turkey) Beşiktaş	33–25	34–26	3rd place
2015–16	EHF Champions League	Round of 16	(France) Montpellier	31–30	28–27	59–57
2015–16	EHF Champions League	Quarter-finals	(Poland) Vive Targi Kielce	28–28	28–29	56–57

Season	Competition	Round	Club	Home	Away	Aggregate
2016–17	EHF Champions League	Group matches (Group A)	(Spain) Barcelona Lassa	27–28	23–26	4th place
2016–17	EHF Champions League	Group matches (Group A)	(France) Paris Saint-Germain	33–34	22–27	4th place
2016–17	EHF Champions League	Group matches (Group A)	(Hungary) Telekom Veszprém	24–24	28–34	4th place
2016–17	EHF Champions League	Group matches (Group A)	(Germany) THW Kiel	25–26	30–22	4th place
2016–17	EHF Champions League	Group matches (Group A)	(Denmark) Bjerringbro-Silkeborg	26–24	25–19	4th place
2016–17	EHF Champions League	Group matches (Group A)	(Poland) Wisła Płock	22–20	37–30	4th place
2016–17	EHF Champions League	Group matches (Group A)	(Switzerland) Kadetten Schaffhausen	31–26	29–26	4th place
2016–17	EHF Champions League	Round of 16	(Belarus) Meshkov Brest	28–26	26–25	54–51
2016–17	EHF Champions League	Quarter-finals	(North Macedonia) Vardar	24–26	27–35	51–61

Season	Competition	Round	Club	Home	Away	Aggregate
2017–18	EHF Champions League	Group matches (Group B)	(France) Paris Saint-Germain	33–29	21–29	3rd place
2017–18	EHF Champions League	Group matches (Group B)	(Hungary) Telekom Veszprém	31–31	22–27	3rd place
2017–18	EHF Champions League	Group matches (Group B)	(Germany) THW Kiel	30–33	20–20	3rd place
2017–18	EHF Champions League	Group matches (Group B)	(Poland) PGE Vive Kielce	32–32	25–25	3rd place
2017–18	EHF Champions League	Group matches (Group B)	(Belarus) Meshkov Brest	37–30	30–28	3rd place
2017–18	EHF Champions League	Group matches (Group B)	(Slovenia) Celje	33–28	30–27	3rd place
2017–18	EHF Champions League	Group matches (Group B)	(Denmark) Aalborg Håndbold	30–27	31–24	3rd place
2017–18	EHF Champions League	Round of 16	(Sweden) IFK Kristianstad	27–24	26–22	53–46
2017–18	EHF Champions League	Quarter-finals	(France) Montpellier	28–28	17–29	45–57

Season	Competition	Round	Club	Home	Away	Aggregate
2018–19	EHF Champions League	Group matches (Group B)	(France) Paris Saint-Germain	20–27	28–29	3rd place
2018–19	EHF Champions League	Group matches (Group B)	(Hungary) MOL-Pick Szeged	27–25	28–30	3rd place
2018–19	EHF Champions League	Group matches (Group B)	(France) HBC Nantes	29–29	34–31	3rd place
2018–19	EHF Champions League	Group matches (Group B)	(Ukraine) Motor Zaporizhzhia	31–24	26–28	3rd place
2018–19	EHF Champions League	Group matches (Group B)	(Croatia) PPD Zagreb	29–31	22–21	3rd place
2018–19	EHF Champions League	Group matches (Group B)	(Denmark) Skjern Håndbold	26–22	31–24	3rd place
2018–19	EHF Champions League	Group matches (Group B)	(Slovenia) Celje Pivovarna Laško	27–26	20–23	3rd place
2018–19	EHF Champions League	Round of 16	(Belarus) Meshkov Brest	30–20	30–28	60–48
2018–19	EHF Champions League	Quarter-finals	(Hungary) Telekom Veszprém	22–28	25–29	47–57

Season	Competition	Round	Club	Home	Away	Aggregate
2019–20	EHF Champions League	Group matches (Group B)	(Spain) Barça	27–34	31–27	5th place
2019–20	EHF Champions League	Group matches (Group B)	(France) Paris Saint-Germain	29–30	30–32	5th place
2019–20	EHF Champions League	Group matches (Group B)	(Hungary) MOL-Pick Szeged	34–26	24–24	5th place
2019–20	EHF Champions League	Group matches (Group B)	(Denmark) Aalborg Håndbold	29–32	28–31	5th place
2019–20	EHF Champions League	Group matches (Group B)	(Slovenia) Celje Pivovarna Laško	29–26	25–24	5th place
2019–20	EHF Champions League	Group matches (Group B)	(Croatia) PPD Zagreb	20–17	26–25	5th place
2019–20	EHF Champions League	Group matches (Group B)	(Norway) Elverum	26–19	34–28	5th place
2019–20	EHF Champions League	Round of 16	(France) Montpellier	Cancelled due to COVID-19		

Season	Competition	Round	Club	Home	Away	Aggregate
2020–21	EHF Champions League	Group matches (Group A)	(Poland) Łomza Vive Kielce	31–30	31–28	1st place
2020–21	EHF Champions League	Group matches (Group A)	(Hungary) MOL-Pick Szeged	26–24	10–0	1st place
2020–21	EHF Champions League	Group matches (Group A)	(Norway) Elverum Håndball	37–35	30–29	1st place
2020–21	EHF Champions League	Group matches (Group A)	(Belarus) Meshkov Brest	29–29	28–26	1st place
2020–21	EHF Champions League	Group matches (Group A)	(France) Paris Saint-Germain	28–27	29–28	1st place
2020–21	EHF Champions League	Group matches (Group A)	(Portugal) FC Porto	36–29	0–10	1st place
2020–21	EHF Champions League	Group matches (Group A)	(North Macedonia) Vardar 1961	0–10	26–31	1st place
2020–21	EHF Champions League	Last 16	(Croatia) PPD Zagreb	10–0	10–0	20–0
2020–21	EHF Champions League	Quarter-finals	(Denmark) Aalborg Håndbold	21–26	33–29	54–55

Note: All five matches which could not be played due to COVID-19 restrictions were adjudicated by the EHF as 10–0 losses for the club which could not field a full team. This decision was officially criticised by SG Flensburg-Handewitt in a public statement.

Season	Competition	Round	Club	Home	Away	Aggregate
2021–22	EHF Champions League	Group matches (Group B)	(Poland) Łomza Vive Kielce	25–33	29–37	6th place
2021–22	EHF Champions League	Group matches (Group B)	(Spain) Barça	21–25	22–29	6th place
2021–22	EHF Champions League	Group matches (Group B)	(France) Paris Saint-Germain	27–27	30–33	6th place
2021–22	EHF Champions League	Group matches (Group B)	(Hungary) Telekom Veszprém	30–27	23–28	6th place
2021–22	EHF Champions League	Group matches (Group B)	(Portugal) FC Porto	26–26	27–28	6th place
2021–22	EHF Champions League	Group matches (Group B)	(Romania) Dinamo București	37–30	28–20	6th place
2021–22	EHF Champions League	Group matches (Group B)	(Ukraine) Motor	34–27	22–31	6th place
2021–22	EHF Champions League	Play-offs	(Hungary) Pick Szeged	25–21	35–36	60–57
2021–22	EHF Champions League	Quarter-finals	(Spain) Barça	29–33	24–27	53–60

Season	Competition	Round	Club	Home	Away	Aggregate
2022–23	EHF European League	Group matches (Group B)	(Sweden) Ystads IF	30–23	26–30	1st place
2022–23	EHF European League	Group matches (Group B)	(Iceland) Valur	33–30	37–32	1st place
2022–23	EHF European League	Group matches (Group B)	(Hungary) FTC	42–30	27–27	1st place
2022–23	EHF European League	Group matches (Group B)	(France) PAUC Handball	30–25	29–21	1st place
2022–23	EHF European League	Group matches (Group B)	(Spain) BM Benidorm	35–30	38–32	1st place
2022–23	EHF European League	Last 16	(Portugal) SL Benfica	33–28	39–26	72–54
2022–23	EHF European League	Quarter-finals	(Spain) Fraikin Granollers	27–35	31–30	58–65

Season	Competition	Round	Club	Home	Away	Aggregate
2023–24	EHF European League	Group matches (Group E)	(Switzerland) Kadetten Schaffhausen	46–32	24–25	1st place
2023–24	EHF European League	Group matches (Group E)	(Norway) Elverum Håndball	38–35	33–32	1st place
2023–24	EHF European League	Group matches (Group E)	(Montenegro) RK Lovćen	42–19	35–19	1st place
2023–24	EHF European League	Main round (Group III)	(Denmark) Bjerringbro-Silkeborg	38–28	45–26	1st place
2023–24	EHF European League	Main round (Group III)	(Serbia) RK Vojvodina	42–30	36–26	1st place
2023–24	EHF European League	Quarter finals	(Sweden) IK Sävehof	28–29	41–30	69–59
2023–24	EHF European League	Semi-final (F4)	(Romania) Dinamo București	38–32		
2023–24	EHF European League	Final (F4)	(Germany) Füchse Berlin	36–31		

Season	Competition	Round	Club	Home	Away	Aggregate
2024–25	EHF European League	Group matches (Group G)	(Hungary) MOL-Tatabánya KC	44–27	39–29	1st place
2024–25	EHF European League	Group matches (Group G)	(Croatia) MRK Sesvete	42–25	32–28	1st place
2024–25	EHF European League	Group matches (Group G)	(Czech Republic) HCB Karviná	36–33	41–31	1st place
2024–25	EHF European League	Main round (Group IV)	(Germany) VfL Gummersbach	32–30	36–31	1st place
2024–25	EHF European League	Main round (Group IV)	(France) Fenix Toulouse Handball	34–34	35–35	1st place
2024–25	EHF European League	Quarterfinals	(Denmark) GOG Håndbold	35–29	29–26	64–55
2024–25	EHF European League	Semi-final (F4)	(Germany) MT Melsungen	35–34		
2024–25	EHF European League	Final (F4)	(France) Montpellier Handball	32–25		

Season	Competition	Round	Club	Home	Away	Aggregate
2025–26	EHF European League	Group matches (Group A)	(France) Saint-Raphaël Var Handball	32–30	36–29	1st place
2025–26	EHF European League	Group matches (Group A)	(Spain) Irudek Bidasoa Irún	38–35	33–32	1st place
2025–26	EHF European League	Group matches (Group A)	(Romania) AHC Potaissa Turda	46–28	33–26	1st place
2025–26	EHF European League	Main round (Group I)	(Germany) THW Kiel	30–32	29–36	2nd place
2025–26	EHF European League	Main round (Group I)	(France) Montpellier Handball	40–35	32–35	2nd place
2025–26	EHF European League	Play-offs	(Denmark) SAH - Skanderborg	33–33	38–32	71–65
2025–26	EHF European League	Quarterfinals	(Germany) TSV Hannover-Burgdorf	39–39	43–35	82–74
2025–26	EHF European League	Semi-final (F4)	(Germany) MT Melsungen	30–37		
2025–26	EHF European League	Third place (F4)	(France) Montpellier Handball	32–30		

=== EHF ranking ===
As of 22 October 2026

Rank	Team	Points
7	(Germany) THW Kiel	462
8	(Portugal) Sporting CP	458
9	(Germany) SG Flensburg-Handewitt	457
10	(Hungary) SC Pick Szeged	436
11	(France) Montpellier Handball	431

== Former club members ==
=== Notable former players ===
- (Germany) Mannhard Bech (1995–1996)
- (Germany) Mark Dragunski (2002–2003)
- (Germany) Jan Fegter (1995–2003, 2006–2007)
- (Germany) Henning Fritz (2021)
- (Germany) Holger Glandorf (2011–2020)
- (Germany) Matthias Hahn (1994–2004)
- (Germany) Jacob Heinl (1994–2018, 2019–2021)
- (Germany) Andreas Hertelt (1991–1992)
- (Germany) Markus Hochhaus (1993–1996)
- (Germany) Jan Holpert (1993–2007)
- (Germany) Lars Kaufmann (2011–2015)
- (Germany) (Belarus) Andrej Klimovets (1997–2005)
- (Germany) Thomas Knorr (1998–2001)
- (Germany) Jörg Kunze (2001–2003)
- (Germany) Maik Machulla (2012–2014, 2015)
- (Germany) Maik Makowka (1997–2002)
- (Germany) Michael Menzel (1990–1994)
- (Germany) Michael Müller (2021)
- (Germany) Christopher Rudeck (2009–2015)
- (Germany) Holger Schneider (1992-1998)
- (Germany) Jens Schöngarth (2020)
- (Germany) Stefan Schröder (1999–2004)
- (Germany) Walter Schubert (1991–1993)
- (Germany) Franz Semper (2020–2023)
- (Germany) Marius Steinhauser (2017–2022)
- (Germany) Andreas Thiel (2001)
- (Germany) Frank von Behren (2006–2008)
- (Germany) Steffen Weinhold (2012–2014)
- (Germany) Henning Wiechers (1993–1996)
- (Germany) Aaron Ziercke (1995)
- (Austria) (Hungary) Viktor Szilágyi (2010–2012)
- (Croatia) Ivan Horvat (2016–2018)
- (Croatia) Igor Kos (2005–2006)
- (Croatia) Krešimir Kozina (2015–2016)
- (Croatia) Blaženko Lacković (2004–2008)
- (Croatia) Goran Šprem (2004–2005, 2005–2006)
- (Denmark) Morten Bjerre (1997–2000)
- (Denmark) Lasse Boesen (2008–2011)
- (Denmark) Joachim Boldsen (2001–2007)
- (Denmark) Lars Christiansen (1996–2010)
- (Denmark) Anders Eggert (2006–2008, 2009–2017)
- (Denmark) Søren Haagen (1998–2001)
- (Denmark) Simon Hald (2018–2023)
- (Denmark) Christian Hjermind (1996–2001)
- (Denmark) Lars Krogh Jeppesen (2000–2004)
- (Denmark) Jan Eiberg Jørgensen (1992–2001)
- (Denmark) Michael V. Knudsen (2005–2014)
- (Denmark) (Germany) Aaron Mensing (2021–2023)
- (Denmark) Thomas Mogensen (2007–2018)
- (Denmark) Kasper Nielsen (2001–2002, 2005–2008)
- (Denmark) Sørenn Rasmussen (2010–2014)
- (Denmark) Rasmus Lauge Schmidt (2015–2019)
- (Denmark) Søren Stryger (2001–2008)
- (Denmark) Lasse Svan Hansen (2008–2022)
- (Denmark) Henrik Toft Hansen (2015–2018)
- (Denmark) Jakob Thoustrup (2009)
- (Denmark) Anders Zachariassen (2014–2020)
- (Egypt) Ahmed El-Ahmar (2015)
- (Estonia) Kaupo Palmar (2004–2005)
- (France) Kentin Mahé (2015–2018)
- (Hungary) Tamás Mocsai (2010–2012)
- (Iceland) Arnór Atlason (2012–2013)
- (Iceland) Ólafur Gústafsson (2012–2014)
- (Iceland) Einar Hólmgeirsson (2007–2008)
- (Latvia) (Iceland) Alexander Petersson (2007–2010, 2021)
- (Netherlands) Dani Baijens (2017–2018)
- (Netherlands) Mark Bult (2017)
- (Netherlands) Niels Versteijnen (2018–2020)
- (Norway) Christian Berge (1999–2006)
- (Norway) Torbjørn Bergerud (2018–2021)
- (Norway) Alexander Buchmann (2003)
- (Norway) Frode Hagen (1997–1998)
- (Norway) Johnny Jensen (2003–2010)
- (Norway) Gøran Johannessen (2018–2023)
- (Norway) Magnus Jøndal (2018–2021)
- (Norway) Roger Kjendalen (1996–2000)
- (Norway) Jan Thomas Lauritzen (2005–2007)
- (Norway) Erlend Mamelund (2009)
- (Norway) Magnus Abelvik Rød (2017–2023)
- (Norway) Frode Scheie (2001–2003)
- (Norway) Glenn Solberg (2001–2003)
- (Norway) Kjetil Strand (2003–2004)
- (Poland) Michał Jurecki (2019–2020)
- (Poland) Marcin Lijewski (2002–2008)
- (Poland) (Germany) Bogdan Wenta (2000–2002)
- (Russia) Igor Lavrov (1998–2001)
- (Montenegro) Alen Muratović (2008-2010)
- (Serbia) Petar Đorđić (2010–2013, 2015–2017)
- (Serbia) Draško Nenadić (2013–2015)
- (Serbia) Bogdan Radivojević (2013–2017)
- (Serbia) Dane Šijan (2007–2008)
- (Switzerland) Marvin Lier (2019–2020)
- (Sweden) Mattias Andersson (2011–2018)
- (Sweden) Dan Beutler (2003–2011)
- (Sweden) Oscar Carlén (2008–2011)
- (Sweden) Patrik Fahlgren (2009–2011)
- (Sweden) Johan Jakobsson (2014–2017)
- (Sweden) Simon Jeppsson (2017–2020)
- (Sweden) Tobias Karlsson (2009–2019)
- (Sweden) Anton Lindskog (2021–2023)
- (Sweden) Johan Sjöstrand (2009–2010)
- (Sweden) Pierre Thorsson (2003–2004)
- (Sweden) Albin Tingsvall (2014–2015)
- (Sweden) Ljubomir Vranjes (2006–2009)
- (Sweden) Hampus Wanne (2013–2022)

=== Former coaches ===
Seasons	Coach	Country	Trophies
1990–1993	Zvonimir Serdarušić	(Croatia) (Germany)	2. Handball-Bundesliga
1993–1998	Anders Dahl-Nielsen	(Denmark)	EHF Cup
1998–2003	Erik Veje Rasmussen	(Denmark)	DHB-Pokal, DHB-Supercup, EHF Cup Winners' Cup, EHF City Cup
2003–2008	Kent-Harry Andersson	(Sweden)	Handball-Bundesliga, 2 DHB-Pokal
2008–2010	Per Carlén	(Sweden)	
2010–2017	Ljubomir Vranjes	(Sweden)	DHB-Pokal, EHF Champions League, EHF Cup Winners' Cup
2017–2023	Maik Machulla	(Germany)	2 Handball-Bundesliga, DHB-Supercup
2023–2025	Nicolej Krickau	(Denmark)	EHF European League
2025–	Aleš Pajovič	(Slovenia)	EHF European League
