= Holger Glandorf =

German handball player (born 1983)

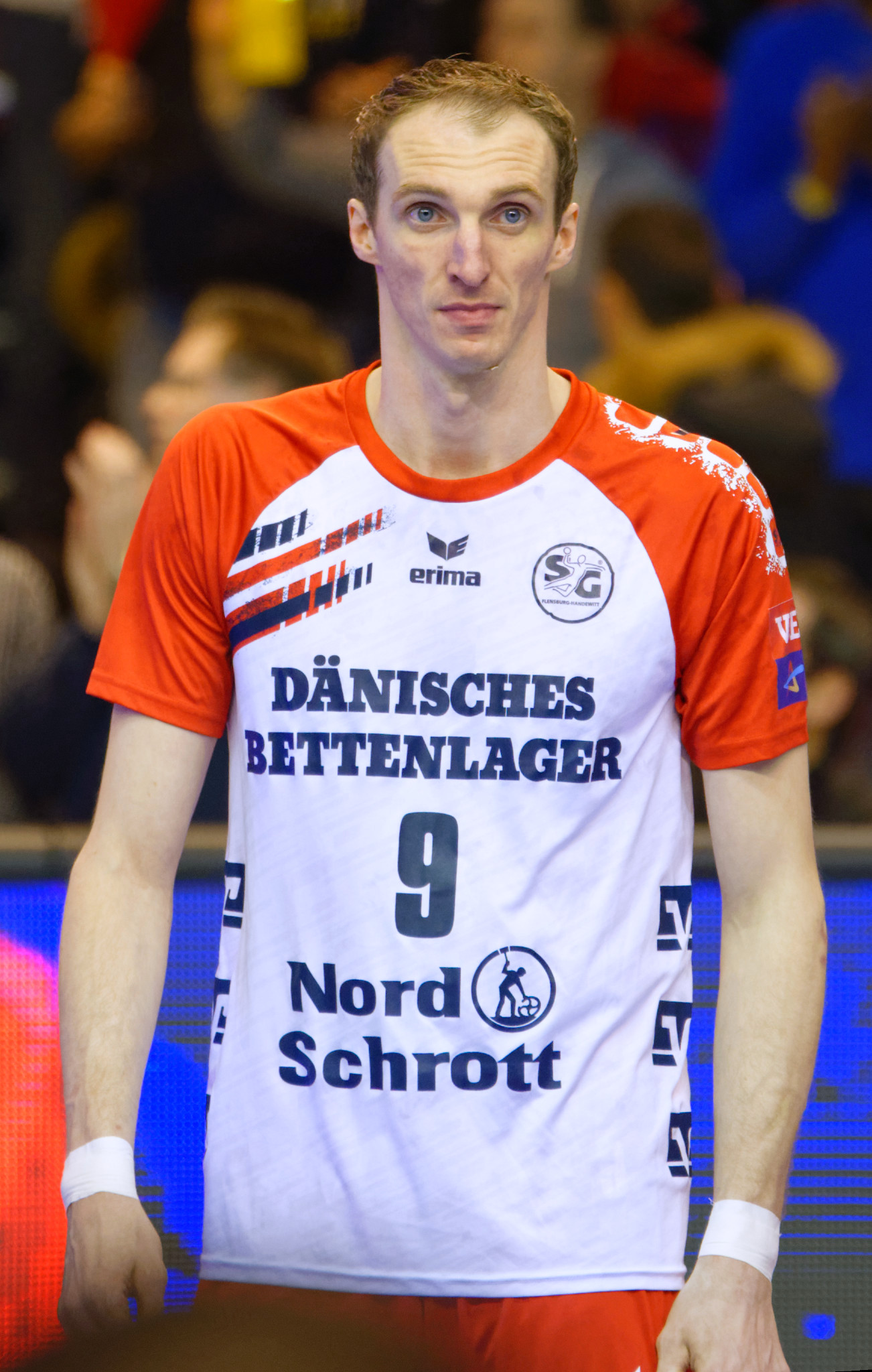

Personal information
- Nationality: German
- Born: 30 March 1983 (age 43) Osnabrück, West Germany
- Height: 1.97 m (6 ft 6 in)

Sport
- Sport: Handball
- Position: Right back

Senior clubs
- Years: Team
- 2001–2009: HSG Nordhorn-Lingen
- 2009–2011: TBV Lemgo
- 2011–2020: SG Flensburg-Handewitt
National team
| Years | Team | Apps | (Gls) |
| 2003–2017 | Germany | 170 | (583) |
Medal record
World Championship
| Gold medal – first place | 2007 Germany |

Holger Glandorf (born 30 March 1983) is a German retired handball player. He has the record for most non-penalty goals in the German Bundesliga. He is a world Champion from the 2007 World Championship.

== Career ==
Glandorfs first professional club was HSG Nordhorn-Lingen in the Bundesliga. Here he came second in the 2001-02 season. He won the EHF European League in 2008.

In 2009 he joined TBV Lemgo after NSG Nordhorn was declared bankrupt in February 2009. Here he won the 2009-10 EHF Cup.

In 2011 he joined SG Flensburg-Handewitt. Here he won the 2011-12 EHF Cup Winners' Cup and the 2013-14 EHF Champions League. In December 2014 he tore his achilles in a match against THW Kiel.

He retired in 2020, and became a part of the SG Flensburg-Handewitt administration.

=== National team ===
Glandorf debuted for the German national team on January 4th 2003 against Hungary.

In 2007 he won the World Championship with Germany. He was awarded the Silbernen Lorbeerblatt for the accomplishment.

At the 2018 European Championship he was the German top scorer with 36 goals.

He competed at the 2008 Summer Olympics in Beijing, where the German team placed 9th.

He initially announced his retirement from the national team on 1 September 2014, but returned for the 2017 World Men's Handball Championship.

He retired in May 2020.

== Post-playing career ==
From July 1st 2022 he has been the administrative director at SG Flensburg Handewitt following Dierk Schmäschke.
