= Stefan Madsen =

Danish handball coach (born 1976)

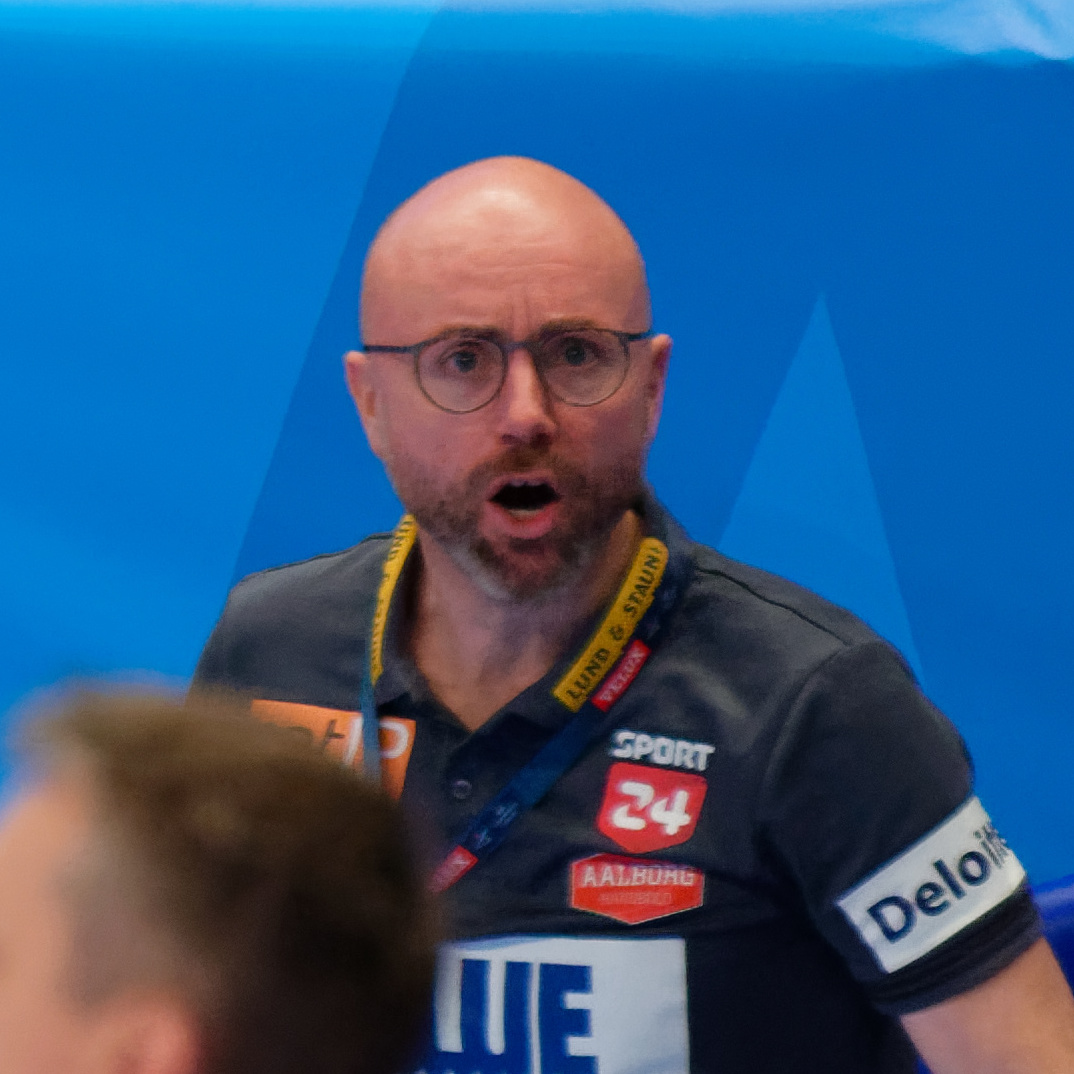

Personal information
- Nationality: Danish
- Born: 4 October 1976 (age 50) Maribo, Denmark

Sport
- Sport: Handball
- Current club: Paris Saint-Germain

Teams managed
- Years: Team
- 2006–2008: Team Sindal/Tårs
- 2008–2010: AaB Håndbold (assistant)
- 2011–2013: HC Leipzig
- 2015–2018: AaB Håndbold (assistant)
- 2014–2017: Denmark junior (assistant)
- 2017–2020: Denmark junior
- 2018–2024: Aalborg Håndbold
- 2024–2025: Al Ahly
- 2025–: Paris Saint-Germain

Stefan Madsen (born 4 October 1976 in Maribo) is a Danish handball coach for Paris Saint-Germain. He has previously been the assistant coach and team coordinator for the club.

In Aalborg, Madsen won the Danish Men's Handball League four times; in 2019, 2020, 2021 and 2024 and the Danish Men's Handball Cup in 2018 and 2021. For three straight seasons he was named Danish men's coach of the year.

In both 2021 and 2024 he led Aalborg Håndbold to the EHF Champions League final, where they lost to FC Barcelona.

From 2014 to 2020 he was part of the Danish national youth teams, first as the assistant coach and from 2017 as the head coach.

On 1 July 2025, Madsen officially took the role of head coach for Paris Saint-Germain Handball.

== See also ==
- Sports in Denmark
