= 2017–18 EHF Champions League group stage =

The 2017–18 EHF Champions League group stage began on 13 September 2017 and concluded on 4 March 2018. A total of 28 teams competed for 14 places in the knockout stage of the 2017–18 EHF Champions League.

== Draw ==
The draw for the group stage was held on 30 June 2017.

=== Seedings ===
The seedings were announced on 27 June 2017.

Seeding pots for Groups A and B
Pot 1	Pot 2	Pot 3	Pot 4
(Hungary) Telekom Veszprém (Spain) Barcelona Lassa	(Poland) PGE Vive Kielce (North Macedonia) Vardar	(France) Paris Saint-Germain (Germany) Rhein-Neckar Löwen	(Croatia) Zagreb (Denmark) Aalborg Håndbold
Pot 5	Pot 6	Pot 7	Pot 8
(Belarus) Meshkov Brest (Poland) Wisła Płock	(Slovenia) Celje (Hungary) MOL-Pick Szeged	(Sweden) IFK Kristianstad (Germany) Flensburg-Handewitt	(France) HBC Nantes (Germany) THW Kiel

Seeding pots for Groups C and D
Pot 1	Pot 2	Pot 3
(Spain) CB Ademar León (North Macedonia) Metalurg Skopje	(Denmark) Skjern Håndbold (Ukraine) Motor Zaporizhzhia	(Slovenia) RK Gorenje Velenje (France) Montpellier Handball
Pot 4	Pot 5	Pot 6
(Switzerland) Kadetten Schaffhausen (Turkey) Beşiktaş	(Russia) Chekhovskiye Medvedi (Romania) Dinamo București	(Norway) Elverum Håndball; Qualifier

== Format ==
In each group, teams played against each other in a double round-robin format, with home and away matches. After completion of the group stage matches, the teams advancing to the knockout stage were determined in the following manner:

- Groups A and B – the top team qualified directly for the quarter-finals, and the five teams ranked 2nd–6th advanced to the first knockout round.
- Groups C and D – the top two teams from both groups contested a playoff to determine the last two sides joining the 10 teams from Groups A and B in the first knockout round.

=== Tiebreakers ===
In the group stage, teams were ranked according to points (2 points for a win, 1 point for a draw, 0 points for a loss). After completion of the group stage, if two or more teams have scored the same number of points, the ranking was determined as follows:

1. Highest number of points in matches between the teams directly involved;
2. Superior goal difference in matches between the teams directly involved;
3. Highest number of goals scored in matches between the teams directly involved (or in the away match in case of a two-team tie);
4. Superior goal difference in all matches of the group;
5. Highest number of plus goals in all matches of the group;

If the ranking of one of these teams is determined, the above criteria are consecutively followed until the ranking of all teams is determined. If no ranking can be determined, a decision shall be obtained by EHF through drawing of lots.

During the group stage, only criteria 4–5 apply to determine the provisional ranking of teams.

== Groups ==
The matchdays were 13–17 September, 20–24 September, 27 September–1 October, 4–8 October, 11–15 October, 1–5 November, 8–12 November, 15–19 November, 22–26 November, 29 November–3 December 2017. For Groups A and B, additional matchdays included, 7–11 February, 14–18 February, 21–25 February and 28 February–4 March 2018.

=== Group A ===
Pos	Team	Pld	W	D	L	GF	GA	GD	Pts	Qualification
1	(North Macedonia) Vardar	14	9	3	2	390	341	+49	21	Quarterfinals
2	(Spain) Barcelona Lassa	14	9	2	3	408	377	+31	20 (Note: Barcelona 56–54 HBC Nantes)	First knockout round
3	(France) HBC Nantes	14	9	2	3	402	382	+20	20	First knockout round
4	(Germany) Rhein-Neckar Löwen	14	6	5	3	416	391	+25	17	First knockout round
5	(Hungary) MOL-Pick Szeged	14	6	1	7	421	411	+10	13	First knockout round
6	(Sweden) IFK Kristianstad	14	3	2	9	355	415	−60	8	First knockout round
7	(Poland) Wisła Płock	14	2	3	9	380	408	−28	7	
8	(Croatia) Zagreb	14	2	2	10	349	396	−47	6	

Source: EHF
Rules for classification: See Tiebreakers
Notes:

16 September 2017; 16:30	IFK Kristianstad (Sweden)	28–28	(Croatia) Zagreb	Kristianstad Arena, Kristianstad; Attendance: 4,040; Referees: Zotin, Volodkov (RUS)
16 September 2017; 16:30	Lagergren 8	(14–16)	Mandalinić 8	Kristianstad Arena, Kristianstad; Attendance: 4,040; Referees: Zotin, Volodkov (RUS)
16 September 2017; 16:30	2× (yellow card) 1× (suspension)	Report	3× (yellow card) 3× (suspension)	Kristianstad Arena, Kristianstad; Attendance: 4,040; Referees: Zotin, Volodkov (RUS)

17 September 2017; 19:00	Wisła Płock (Poland)	22–26	(North Macedonia) Vardar	Orlen Arena, Płock; Attendance: 4,750; Referees: López, Ramírez (ESP)
17 September 2017; 19:00	Daszek 6	(9–13)	Borozan 5	Orlen Arena, Płock; Attendance: 4,750; Referees: López, Ramírez (ESP)
17 September 2017; 19:00	2× (yellow card) 5× (suspension)	Report	4× (yellow card) 5× (suspension)	Orlen Arena, Płock; Attendance: 4,750; Referees: López, Ramírez (ESP)

17 September 2017; 19:30	Rhein-Neckar Löwen (Germany)	31–31	(Spain) Barcelona Lassa	SAP Arena, Mannheim; Attendance: 6,059; Referees: Gjeding, Hansen (DEN)
17 September 2017; 19:30	Pekeler 7	(12–18)	Mem 7	SAP Arena, Mannheim; Attendance: 6,059; Referees: Gjeding, Hansen (DEN)
17 September 2017; 19:30	2× (yellow card) 6× (suspension)	Report	2× (yellow card) 5× (suspension)	SAP Arena, Mannheim; Attendance: 6,059; Referees: Gjeding, Hansen (DEN)

17 September 2017; 19:30	HBC Nantes (France)	30–26	(Hungary) MOL-Pick Szeged	La Trocardière, Rezé; Attendance: 4,090; Referees: Nikolov, Nachevski (MKD)
17 September 2017; 19:30	Klein 6	(18–15)	Balogh 5	La Trocardière, Rezé; Attendance: 4,090; Referees: Nikolov, Nachevski (MKD)
17 September 2017; 19:30	2× (yellow card) 1× (suspension)	Report	3× (yellow card) 3× (suspension)	La Trocardière, Rezé; Attendance: 4,090; Referees: Nikolov, Nachevski (MKD)

20 September 2017; 18:30	Rhein-Neckar Löwen (Germany)	31–27	(Poland) Wisła Płock	Sportzentrum Harres, Sankt Leon-Rot; Attendance: 1,152; Referees: Elíasson, Pálsson (ISL)
20 September 2017; 18:30	Baena, Tollbring 6	(13–13)	Daszek 6	Sportzentrum Harres, Sankt Leon-Rot; Attendance: 1,152; Referees: Elíasson, Pálsson (ISL)
20 September 2017; 18:30	3× (yellow card) 1× (suspension)	Report	2× (yellow card) 3× (suspension)	Sportzentrum Harres, Sankt Leon-Rot; Attendance: 1,152; Referees: Elíasson, Pálsson (ISL)

23 September 2017; 17:30	Vardar (North Macedonia)	27–23	(France) HBC Nantes	Jane Sandanski Arena, Skopje; Attendance: 5,050; Referees: Brunovský, Čanda (SVK)
23 September 2017; 17:30	Ferreira 6	(14–10)	three players 4	Jane Sandanski Arena, Skopje; Attendance: 5,050; Referees: Brunovský, Čanda (SVK)
23 September 2017; 17:30	2× (yellow card)	Report	3× (yellow card) 1× (suspension)	Jane Sandanski Arena, Skopje; Attendance: 5,050; Referees: Brunovský, Čanda (SVK)

23 September 2017; 18:00	Barcelona Lassa (Spain)	31–29	(Sweden) IFK Kristianstad	Palau Blaugrana, Barcelona; Attendance: 2,200; Referees: Baranowski, Lemanowicz (POL)
23 September 2017; 18:00	Rivera Folch 9	(15–12)	Sørensen 6	Palau Blaugrana, Barcelona; Attendance: 2,200; Referees: Baranowski, Lemanowicz (POL)
23 September 2017; 18:00	3× (yellow card) 3× (suspension)	Report	3× (yellow card) 8× (suspension)	Palau Blaugrana, Barcelona; Attendance: 2,200; Referees: Baranowski, Lemanowicz (POL)

23 September 2017; 20:00	Zagreb (Croatia)	23–28	(Hungary) MOL-Pick Szeged	Arena Zagreb, Zagreb; Attendance: 7,237; Referees: Erdoğan, Özdeniz (TUR)
23 September 2017; 20:00	Mrakovčić, Vuglač 5	(12–17)	Balogh 8	Arena Zagreb, Zagreb; Attendance: 7,237; Referees: Erdoğan, Özdeniz (TUR)
23 September 2017; 20:00	4× (yellow card) 4× (suspension)	Report	2× (yellow card) 6× (suspension)	Arena Zagreb, Zagreb; Attendance: 7,237; Referees: Erdoğan, Özdeniz (TUR)

27 September 2017; 18:30	HBC Nantes (France)	26–26	(Germany) Rhein-Neckar Löwen	La Trocardière, Rezé; Attendance: 4,010; Referees: Santos, Fonseca (POR)
27 September 2017; 18:30	Lagarde, Lazarov 6	(15–16)	Schmid 8	La Trocardière, Rezé; Attendance: 4,010; Referees: Santos, Fonseca (POR)
27 September 2017; 18:30	2× (yellow card) 2× (suspension)	Report	1× (yellow card) 1× (suspension)	La Trocardière, Rezé; Attendance: 4,010; Referees: Santos, Fonseca (POR)

1 October 2017; 17:00	Vardar (North Macedonia)	28–21	(Croatia) Zagreb	Jane Sandanski Arena, Skopje; Attendance: 4,500; Referees: Sondors, Līcis (LAT)
1 October 2017; 17:00	Borozan, Maqueda 4	(13–10)	Mandalinić 9	Jane Sandanski Arena, Skopje; Attendance: 4,500; Referees: Sondors, Līcis (LAT)
1 October 2017; 17:00	2× (yellow card) 3× (suspension)	Report	2× (yellow card) 6× (suspension)	Jane Sandanski Arena, Skopje; Attendance: 4,500; Referees: Sondors, Līcis (LAT)

1 October 2017; 17:00	MOL-Pick Szeged (Hungary)	36–27	(Sweden) IFK Kristianstad	Városi Sportcsarnok, Szeged; Attendance: 3,200; Referees: Vešović, Mitrović (MNE)
1 October 2017; 17:00	Bodó 7	(20–11)	Hallén 7	Városi Sportcsarnok, Szeged; Attendance: 3,200; Referees: Vešović, Mitrović (MNE)
1 October 2017; 17:00	3× (yellow card) 3× (suspension)	Report	2× (yellow card) 4× (suspension)	Városi Sportcsarnok, Szeged; Attendance: 3,200; Referees: Vešović, Mitrović (MNE)

1 October 2017; 19:00	Wisła Płock (Poland)	30–37	(Spain) Lassa Barcelona	Orlen Arena, Płock; Attendance: 5,467; Referees: Caçador, Nicolau (POR)
1 October 2017; 19:00	Duarte, Ghionea 4	(13–21)	Jallouz 6	Orlen Arena, Płock; Attendance: 5,467; Referees: Caçador, Nicolau (POR)
1 October 2017; 19:00	3× (yellow card) 2× (suspension)	Report	3× (yellow card) 2× (suspension)	Orlen Arena, Płock; Attendance: 5,467; Referees: Caçador, Nicolau (POR)

7 October 2017; 17:30	IFK Kristianstad (Sweden)	22–35	(Germany) Rhein-Neckar Löwen	Kristianstad Arena, Kristianstad; Attendance: 5,017; Referees: Pichon, Reveret (FRA)
7 October 2017; 17:30	Guðmundsson 6	(12–18)	Schmid, Tollbring 7	Kristianstad Arena, Kristianstad; Attendance: 5,017; Referees: Pichon, Reveret (FRA)
7 October 2017; 17:30	2× (yellow card) 2× (suspension)	Report	2× (yellow card) 4× (suspension)	Kristianstad Arena, Kristianstad; Attendance: 5,017; Referees: Pichon, Reveret (FRA)

7 October 2017; 17:30	MOL-Pick Szeged (Hungary)	26–26	(North Macedonia) Vardar	Városi Sportcsarnok, Szeged; Attendance: 3,200; Referees: Gousko, Repkin (BLR)
7 October 2017; 17:30	Buntić 5	(14–13)	Borozan 8	Városi Sportcsarnok, Szeged; Attendance: 3,200; Referees: Gousko, Repkin (BLR)
7 October 2017; 17:30	2× (yellow card) 4× (suspension)	Report	4× (yellow card) 2× (suspension)	Városi Sportcsarnok, Szeged; Attendance: 3,200; Referees: Gousko, Repkin (BLR)

7 October 2017; 20:00	Barcelona Lassa (Spain)	31–25	(France) HBC Nantes	Palau Blaugrana, Barcelona; Attendance: 2,891; Referees: Geipel, Helbig (GER)
7 October 2017; 20:00	Mem, Syprzak 6	(13–16)	Faluvégi, Lagarde 5	Palau Blaugrana, Barcelona; Attendance: 2,891; Referees: Geipel, Helbig (GER)
7 October 2017; 20:00	2× (yellow card)	Report	3× (yellow card) 2× (suspension)	Palau Blaugrana, Barcelona; Attendance: 2,891; Referees: Geipel, Helbig (GER)

8 October 2017; 17:00	Zagreb (Croatia)	28–28	(Poland) Wisła Płock	Arena Zagreb, Zagreb; Attendance: 6,000; Referees: Horáček, Novotný (CZE)
8 October 2017; 17:00	Mandalinić 10	(18–16)	Duarte, Mihić 5	Arena Zagreb, Zagreb; Attendance: 6,000; Referees: Horáček, Novotný (CZE)
8 October 2017; 17:00	3× (yellow card) 3× (suspension)	Report	3× (yellow card) 6× (suspension) 1× (red card)	Arena Zagreb, Zagreb; Attendance: 6,000; Referees: Horáček, Novotný (CZE)

11 October 2017; 18:00	Wisła Płock (Poland)	27–33	(Hungary) MOL-Pick Szeged	Orlen Arena, Płock; Attendance: 3,500; Referees: Pavićević, Ražnatović (MNE)
11 October 2017; 18:00	Daszek 7	(12–15)	Buntić 5	Orlen Arena, Płock; Attendance: 3,500; Referees: Pavićević, Ražnatović (MNE)
11 October 2017; 18:00	3× (yellow card) 4× (suspension)	Report	2× (yellow card) 5× (suspension)	Orlen Arena, Płock; Attendance: 3,500; Referees: Pavićević, Ražnatović (MNE)

12 October 2017; 21:00	Rhein-Neckar Löwen (Germany)	31–24	(Croatia) Zagreb	SAP Arena, Mannheim; Attendance: 2,945; Referees: Caçador, Nicolau (POR)
12 October 2017; 21:00	Pekeler 8	(15–11)	Marković 7	SAP Arena, Mannheim; Attendance: 2,945; Referees: Caçador, Nicolau (POR)
12 October 2017; 21:00	2× (yellow card) 3× (suspension)	Report	3× (yellow card) 1× (suspension)	SAP Arena, Mannheim; Attendance: 2,945; Referees: Caçador, Nicolau (POR)

14 October 2017; 17:30	Vardar (North Macedonia)	27–24	(Spain) Barcelona Lassa	Jane Sandanski Arena, Skopje; Attendance: 5,500; Referees: Mažeika, Gatelis (LTU)
14 October 2017; 17:30	Borozan 6	(16–12)	Rivera 8	Jane Sandanski Arena, Skopje; Attendance: 5,500; Referees: Mažeika, Gatelis (LTU)
14 October 2017; 17:30	3× (yellow card) 3× (suspension)	Report	3× (yellow card) 5× (suspension)	Jane Sandanski Arena, Skopje; Attendance: 5,500; Referees: Mažeika, Gatelis (LTU)

14 October 2017; 17:30	HBC Nantes (France)	34–25	(Sweden) IFK Kristianstad	La Trocardière, Rezé; Attendance: 4,124; Referees: Sigurjónsson, Pétursson (ISL)
14 October 2017; 17:30	Tournat 10	(19–11)	Sørensen 6	La Trocardière, Rezé; Attendance: 4,124; Referees: Sigurjónsson, Pétursson (ISL)
14 October 2017; 17:30	4× (yellow card) 4× (suspension)	Report	3× (yellow card) 5× (suspension)	La Trocardière, Rezé; Attendance: 4,124; Referees: Sigurjónsson, Pétursson (ISL)

4 November 2017; 18:00	Barcelona Lassa (Spain)	32–22	(Croatia) Zagreb	Palau Blaugrana, Barcelona; Attendance: 3,410; Referees: Pichon, Reveret (FRA)
4 November 2017; 18:00	Rivera, Syprzak 5	(17–8)	Mandalinić 5	Palau Blaugrana, Barcelona; Attendance: 3,410; Referees: Pichon, Reveret (FRA)
4 November 2017; 18:00	2× (yellow card) 3× (suspension)	Report	2× (yellow card) 3× (suspension)	Palau Blaugrana, Barcelona; Attendance: 3,410; Referees: Pichon, Reveret (FRA)

4 November 2017; 18:00	IFK Kristianstad (Sweden)	23–26	(North Macedonia) Vardar	Kristianstad Arena, Kristianstad; Attendance: 4,030; Referees: Santos, Fonseca (POR)
4 November 2017; 18:00	Henningsson, Guðmundsson 4	(10–15)	three players 7	Kristianstad Arena, Kristianstad; Attendance: 4,030; Referees: Santos, Fonseca (POR)
4 November 2017; 18:00	2× (yellow card) 4× (suspension)	Report	1× (yellow card) 3× (suspension)	Kristianstad Arena, Kristianstad; Attendance: 4,030; Referees: Santos, Fonseca (POR)

5 November 2017; 17:15	MOL-Pick Szeged (Hungary)	31–34	(Germany) Rhein-Neckar Löwen	Városi Sportcsarnok, Szeged; Attendance: 3,200; Referees: Horáček, Novotný (CZE)
5 November 2017; 17:15	Bodó, Zhitnikov 5	(14–19)	Schmid 9	Városi Sportcsarnok, Szeged; Attendance: 3,200; Referees: Horáček, Novotný (CZE)
5 November 2017; 17:15	3× (yellow card) 2× (suspension)	Report	3× (yellow card) 3× (suspension)	Városi Sportcsarnok, Szeged; Attendance: 3,200; Referees: Horáček, Novotný (CZE)

5 November 2017; 19:00	Wisła Płock (Poland)	30–32	(France) HBC Nantes	Orlen Arena, Płock; Attendance: 4,100; Referees: Konjičanin, Konjičanin (BIH)
5 November 2017; 19:00	Ivić, Žabič 5	(13–16)	Balaguer 9	Orlen Arena, Płock; Attendance: 4,100; Referees: Konjičanin, Konjičanin (BIH)
5 November 2017; 19:00	3× (yellow card) 3× (suspension)	Report	2× (yellow card) 3× (suspension)	Orlen Arena, Płock; Attendance: 4,100; Referees: Konjičanin, Konjičanin (BIH)

11 November 2017; 16:00	IFK Kristianstad (Sweden)	25–24	(Poland) Wisła Płock	Kristianstad Arena, Kristianstad; Attendance: 3,859; Referees: Madsen, Mortensen (DEN)
11 November 2017; 16:00	Henningsson 5	(15–10)	Toledo 6	Kristianstad Arena, Kristianstad; Attendance: 3,859; Referees: Madsen, Mortensen (DEN)
11 November 2017; 16:00	2× (yellow card) 3× (suspension)	Report	3× (yellow card) 4× (suspension)	Kristianstad Arena, Kristianstad; Attendance: 3,859; Referees: Madsen, Mortensen (DEN)

11 November 2017; 17:30	MOL-Pick Szeged (Hungary)	29–33	(France) HBC Nantes	Városi Sportcsarnok, Szeged; Attendance: 3,200; Referees: Pandžić, Mosorinski (SRB)
11 November 2017; 17:30	Balogh 6	(15–17)	Faluvégi, Gurbindo 6	Városi Sportcsarnok, Szeged; Attendance: 3,200; Referees: Pandžić, Mosorinski (SRB)
11 November 2017; 17:30	2× (yellow card)	Report	4× (yellow card) 2× (suspension)	Városi Sportcsarnok, Szeged; Attendance: 3,200; Referees: Pandžić, Mosorinski (SRB)

11 November 2017; 20:00	Zagreb (Croatia)	23–29	(North Macedonia) Vardar	Arena Zagreb, Zagreb; Attendance: 9,200; Referees: Elíasson, Pálsson (ISL)
11 November 2017; 20:00	Mandalinić 6	(10–15)	Čupić 7	Arena Zagreb, Zagreb; Attendance: 9,200; Referees: Elíasson, Pálsson (ISL)
11 November 2017; 20:00	4× (yellow card) 3× (suspension)	Report	3× (yellow card)	Arena Zagreb, Zagreb; Attendance: 9,200; Referees: Elíasson, Pálsson (ISL)

12 November 2017; 19:00	Barcelona Lassa (Spain)	26–26	(Germany) Rhein-Neckar Löwen	Palau Blaugrana, Barcelona; Attendance: 5,154; Referees: Jurinović, Mrvica (CRO)
12 November 2017; 19:00	Mem 8	(13–13)	Rnić 9	Palau Blaugrana, Barcelona; Attendance: 5,154; Referees: Jurinović, Mrvica (CRO)
12 November 2017; 19:00	2× (yellow card) 1× (suspension)	Report	2× (yellow card) 2× (suspension)	Palau Blaugrana, Barcelona; Attendance: 5,154; Referees: Jurinović, Mrvica (CRO)

18 November 2017; 17:30	Vardar (North Macedonia)	30–26	(Germany) Rhein-Neckar Löwen	Jane Sandanski Arena, Skopje; Attendance: 5,500; Referees: Dinu, Din (ROU)
18 November 2017; 17:30	Borozan 7	(17–13)	Baena, Schmid 5	Jane Sandanski Arena, Skopje; Attendance: 5,500; Referees: Dinu, Din (ROU)
18 November 2017; 17:30	3× (yellow card) 4× (suspension)	Report	2× (yellow card) 4× (suspension)	Jane Sandanski Arena, Skopje; Attendance: 5,500; Referees: Dinu, Din (ROU)

19 November 2017; 17:00	MOL-Pick Szeged (Hungary)	31–28	(Spain) Barcelona Lassa	Városi Sportcsarnok, Szeged; Attendance: 3,200; Referees: Zotin, Volodkov (RUS)
19 November 2017; 17:00	Balogh 9	(16–13)	N'Guessan 7	Városi Sportcsarnok, Szeged; Attendance: 3,200; Referees: Zotin, Volodkov (RUS)
19 November 2017; 17:00	3× (yellow card) 5× (suspension)	Report	3× (yellow card) 2× (suspension)	Városi Sportcsarnok, Szeged; Attendance: 3,200; Referees: Zotin, Volodkov (RUS)

19 November 2017; 17:00	HBC Nantes (France)	28–27	(Croatia) Zagreb	La Trocardière, Rezé; Attendance: 4,319; Referees: López, Ramírez (ESP)
19 November 2017; 17:00	Burić 6	(13–12)	Bičanić 6	La Trocardière, Rezé; Attendance: 4,319; Referees: López, Ramírez (ESP)
19 November 2017; 17:00	2× (yellow card) 4× (suspension)	Report	3× (yellow card) 3× (suspension)	La Trocardière, Rezé; Attendance: 4,319; Referees: López, Ramírez (ESP)

19 November 2017; 18:30	Wisła Płock (Poland)	25–25	(Sweden) IFK Kristianstad	Orlen Arena, Płock; Attendance: 4,000; Referees: Lah, Sok (SLO)
19 November 2017; 18:30	Daszek 7	(13–13)	Sørensen 7	Orlen Arena, Płock; Attendance: 4,000; Referees: Lah, Sok (SLO)
19 November 2017; 18:30	3× (yellow card) 4× (suspension)	Report	1× (yellow card) 5× (suspension)	Orlen Arena, Płock; Attendance: 4,000; Referees: Lah, Sok (SLO)

23 November 2017; 19:00	Zagreb (Croatia)	24–32	(Spain) Barcelona Lassa	Arena Zagreb, Zagreb; Attendance: 9,375; Referees: Madsen, Mortensen (DEN)
23 November 2017; 19:00	Marković 6	(11–16)	Mem, Rivera Folch 7	Arena Zagreb, Zagreb; Attendance: 9,375; Referees: Madsen, Mortensen (DEN)
23 November 2017; 19:00	2× (yellow card)	Report	1× (yellow card) 2× (suspension)	Arena Zagreb, Zagreb; Attendance: 9,375; Referees: Madsen, Mortensen (DEN)

25 November 2017; 17:30	HBC Nantes (France)	32–30	(Poland) Wisła Płock	La Trocardière, Rezé; Attendance: 4,016; Referees: Mažeika, Gatelis (LTU)
25 November 2017; 17:30	Burić 7	(18–12)	Duarte 5	La Trocardière, Rezé; Attendance: 4,016; Referees: Mažeika, Gatelis (LTU)
25 November 2017; 17:30	1× (yellow card) 2× (suspension)	Report	2× (yellow card) 5× (suspension)	La Trocardière, Rezé; Attendance: 4,016; Referees: Mažeika, Gatelis (LTU)

26 November 2017; 19:00	Rhein-Neckar Löwen (Germany)	21–21	(North Macedonia) Vardar	SAP Arena, Mannheim; Attendance: 4,251; Referees: Zotin, Volodkov (RUS)
26 November 2017; 19:00	Larsen, Petersson 4	(11–11)	Dibirov, Krištopāns 5	SAP Arena, Mannheim; Attendance: 4,251; Referees: Zotin, Volodkov (RUS)
26 November 2017; 19:00	4× (yellow card) 3× (suspension)	Report	3× (yellow card) 2× (suspension)	SAP Arena, Mannheim; Attendance: 4,251; Referees: Zotin, Volodkov (RUS)

26 November 2017; 19:00	IFK Kristianstad (Sweden)	33–32	(Hungary) MOL-Pick Szeged	Kristianstad Arena, Kristianstad; Attendance: 4,110; Referees: Sondors, Līcis (LAT)
26 November 2017; 19:00	Lagergren 12	(16–13)	Balogh 7	Kristianstad Arena, Kristianstad; Attendance: 4,110; Referees: Sondors, Līcis (LAT)
26 November 2017; 19:00	2× (yellow card) 1× (suspension)	Report	2× (yellow card) 1× (suspension)	Kristianstad Arena, Kristianstad; Attendance: 4,110; Referees: Sondors, Līcis (LAT)

29 November 2017; 19:00	Zagreb (Croatia)	30–26	(Germany) Rhein-Neckar Löwen	Arena Zagreb, Zagreb; Attendance: 3,738; Referees: Brunovský, Čanda (SVK)
29 November 2017; 19:00	Horvat 8	(17–13)	Sigurðsson 9	Arena Zagreb, Zagreb; Attendance: 3,738; Referees: Brunovský, Čanda (SVK)
29 November 2017; 19:00	3× (yellow card) 4× (suspension)	Report	3× (yellow card) 2× (suspension)	Arena Zagreb, Zagreb; Attendance: 3,738; Referees: Brunovský, Čanda (SVK)

2 December 2017; 16:00	MOL-Pick Szeged (Hungary)	24–25	(Poland) Wisła Płock	Városi Sportcsarnok, Szeged; Attendance: 3,100; Referees: Tzaferopoulos, Bethmann (GER)
2 December 2017; 16:00	Balogh 6	(12–14)	Toledo 7	Városi Sportcsarnok, Szeged; Attendance: 3,100; Referees: Tzaferopoulos, Bethmann (GER)
2 December 2017; 16:00	3× (yellow card) 2× (suspension)	Report	4× (yellow card) 5× (suspension)	Városi Sportcsarnok, Szeged; Attendance: 3,100; Referees: Tzaferopoulos, Bethmann (GER)

2 December 2017; 17:30	Vardar (North Macedonia)	31–15	(Sweden) IFK Kristianstad	Jane Sandanski Arena, Skopje; Attendance: 5,000; Referees: Kouz, Zhoba (UKR)
2 December 2017; 17:30	Dibirov 7	(14–8)	Sørensen 4	Jane Sandanski Arena, Skopje; Attendance: 5,000; Referees: Kouz, Zhoba (UKR)
2 December 2017; 17:30	3× (yellow card) 4× (suspension)	Report	3× (yellow card) 5× (suspension)	Jane Sandanski Arena, Skopje; Attendance: 5,000; Referees: Kouz, Zhoba (UKR)

2 December 2017; 20:45	HBC Nantes (France)	29–25	(Spain) Barcelona Lassa	La Trocardière, Rezé; Attendance: 10,000; Referees: Gousko, Repkin (BLR)
2 December 2017; 20:45	Balaguer 5	(16–11)	Mem 6	La Trocardière, Rezé; Attendance: 10,000; Referees: Gousko, Repkin (BLR)
2 December 2017; 20:45	3× (yellow card) 2× (suspension)	Report	3× (yellow card) 1× (suspension)	La Trocardière, Rezé; Attendance: 10,000; Referees: Gousko, Repkin (BLR)

10 February 2018; 16:00	Wisła Płock (Poland)	27–24	(Croatia) Zagreb	Orlen Arena, Płock; Attendance: 3,990; Referees: Kirkholm, Mortensen (DEN)
10 February 2018; 16:00	Ivić 5	(13–10)	Bičanić 8	Orlen Arena, Płock; Attendance: 3,990; Referees: Kirkholm, Mortensen (DEN)
10 February 2018; 16:00	2× (yellow card) 3× (suspension)	Report	2× (yellow card) 3× (suspension)	Orlen Arena, Płock; Attendance: 3,990; Referees: Kirkholm, Mortensen (DEN)

10 February 2018; 17:30	IFK Kristianstad (Sweden)	26–31	(France) HBC Nantes	Kristianstad Arena, Kristianstad; Attendance: 3,816; Referees: Horáček, Novotný (CZE)
10 February 2018; 17:30	Guðmundsson 9	(12–13)	Balaguer 11	Kristianstad Arena, Kristianstad; Attendance: 3,816; Referees: Horáček, Novotný (CZE)
10 February 2018; 17:30	2× (yellow card) 2× (suspension)	Report	2× (yellow card) 5× (suspension)	Kristianstad Arena, Kristianstad; Attendance: 3,816; Referees: Horáček, Novotný (CZE)

10 February 2018; 18:00	Barcelona Lassa (Spain)	29–28	(North Macedonia) Vardar	Palau Blaugrana, Barcelona; Attendance: 4,219; Referees: Gjeding, Hansen (DEN)
10 February 2018; 18:00	Jallouz 6	(15–14)	Krištopāns 7	Palau Blaugrana, Barcelona; Attendance: 4,219; Referees: Gjeding, Hansen (DEN)
10 February 2018; 18:00	1× (yellow card) 5× (suspension)	Report	3× (yellow card) 7× (suspension)	Palau Blaugrana, Barcelona; Attendance: 4,219; Referees: Gjeding, Hansen (DEN)

11 February 2018; 17:00	Rhein-Neckar Löwen (Germany)	35–37	(Hungary) MOL-Pick Szeged	Sportzentrum Harres, St. Leon-Rot; Attendance: 2,000; Referees: Santos, Fonseca (POR)
11 February 2018; 17:00	Mensah Larsen 8	(17–15)	Sršen 7	Sportzentrum Harres, St. Leon-Rot; Attendance: 2,000; Referees: Santos, Fonseca (POR)
11 February 2018; 17:00	2× (yellow card) 2× (suspension)	Report	1× (yellow card) 1× (suspension)	Sportzentrum Harres, St. Leon-Rot; Attendance: 2,000; Referees: Santos, Fonseca (POR)

17 February 2018; 19:30	Barcelona Lassa (Spain)	28–27	(Poland) Wisła Płock	Palau Blaugrana, Barcelona; Attendance: 2,515; Referees: Sondors, Līcis (LAT)
17 February 2018; 19:30	Dolenec 6	(14–15)	Racoțea, Toledo 5	Palau Blaugrana, Barcelona; Attendance: 2,515; Referees: Sondors, Līcis (LAT)
17 February 2018; 19:30	2× (yellow card) 1× (suspension)	Report	1× (yellow card) 5× (suspension)	Palau Blaugrana, Barcelona; Attendance: 2,515; Referees: Sondors, Līcis (LAT)

17 February 2018; 20:00	Zagreb (Croatia)	23–22	(France) HBC Nantes	Arena Zagreb, Zagreb; Attendance: 5,273; Referees: Nikolić, Stojković (SRB)
17 February 2018; 20:00	Pavlović 7	(12–8)	Gurbindo 5	Arena Zagreb, Zagreb; Attendance: 5,273; Referees: Nikolić, Stojković (SRB)
17 February 2018; 20:00	4× (yellow card) 3× (suspension)	Report	3× (yellow card) 2× (suspension)	Arena Zagreb, Zagreb; Attendance: 5,273; Referees: Nikolić, Stojković (SRB)

18 February 2018; 17:00	Vardar (North Macedonia)	34–30	(Hungary) MOL-Pick Szeged	Jane Sandanski Arena, Skopje; Attendance: 5,500; Referees: Baďura, Ondogrecula (SVK)
18 February 2018; 17:00	Dibirov 11	(16–14)	Sršen 6	Jane Sandanski Arena, Skopje; Attendance: 5,500; Referees: Baďura, Ondogrecula (SVK)
18 February 2018; 17:00	2× (yellow card) 1× (suspension)	Report	3× (yellow card) 3× (suspension)	Jane Sandanski Arena, Skopje; Attendance: 5,500; Referees: Baďura, Ondogrecula (SVK)

18 February 2018; 19:00	Rhein-Neckar Löwen (Germany)	32–29	(Sweden) IFK Kristianstad	Sportzentrum Harres, St. Leon-Rot; Attendance: 2,000; Referees: Erdoğan, Özdeniz (TUR)
18 February 2018; 19:00	Mensah Larsen, Radivojević 5	(16–14)	Guðmundsson 9	Sportzentrum Harres, St. Leon-Rot; Attendance: 2,000; Referees: Erdoğan, Özdeniz (TUR)
18 February 2018; 19:00	4× (yellow card) 3× (suspension) 1× (red card)	Report	2× (yellow card) 7× (suspension)	Sportzentrum Harres, St. Leon-Rot; Attendance: 2,000; Referees: Erdoğan, Özdeniz (TUR)

24 February 2018; 16:00	IFK Kristianstad (Sweden)	21–26	(Spain) Barcelona Lassa	Kristianstad Arena, Kristianstad; Attendance: 4,998; Referees: Lah, Sok (SLO)
24 February 2018; 16:00	Nilsen 6	(8–11)	Mem 5	Kristianstad Arena, Kristianstad; Attendance: 4,998; Referees: Lah, Sok (SLO)
24 February 2018; 16:00	2× (yellow card) 2× (suspension)	Report	2× (yellow card)	Kristianstad Arena, Kristianstad; Attendance: 4,998; Referees: Lah, Sok (SLO)

24 February 2018; 17:30	MOL-Pick Szeged (Hungary)	30–28	(Croatia) Zagreb	Városi Sportcsarnok, Szeged; Attendance: 3,200; Referees: Geipel, Helbig (GER)
24 February 2018; 17:30	Šoštarič 9	(11–15)	Horvat 12	Városi Sportcsarnok, Szeged; Attendance: 3,200; Referees: Geipel, Helbig (GER)
24 February 2018; 17:30	1× (yellow card) 6× (suspension)	Report	2× (yellow card) 6× (suspension)	Városi Sportcsarnok, Szeged; Attendance: 3,200; Referees: Geipel, Helbig (GER)

25 February 2018; 19:00	HBC Nantes (France)	27–26	(North Macedonia) Vardar	La Trocardière, Rezé; Attendance: 4,438; Referees: Elíasson, Pálsson (ISL)
25 February 2018; 19:00	Gurbindo 8	(18–12)	Cindrić, Dibirov 5	La Trocardière, Rezé; Attendance: 4,438; Referees: Elíasson, Pálsson (ISL)
25 February 2018; 19:00	3× (yellow card) 4× (suspension)	Report	4× (yellow card) 6× (suspension)	La Trocardière, Rezé; Attendance: 4,438; Referees: Elíasson, Pálsson (ISL)

25 February 2018; 19:00	Wisła Płock (Poland)	27–32	(Germany) Rhein-Neckar Löwen	Orlen Arena, Płock; Attendance: 4,500; Referees: Pandzić, Mosorinski (SRB)
25 February 2018; 19:00	Ghionea 6	(15–14)	Sigurðsson 10	Orlen Arena, Płock; Attendance: 4,500; Referees: Pandzić, Mosorinski (SRB)
25 February 2018; 19:00	3× (yellow card) 2× (suspension)	Report	4× (yellow card) 2× (suspension)	Orlen Arena, Płock; Attendance: 4,500; Referees: Pandzić, Mosorinski (SRB)

3 March 2018; 17:30	Rhein-Neckar Löwen (Germany)	30–30	(France) HBC Nantes	Sportzentrum Harres, St. Leon-Rot; Attendance: 2,500; Referees: Gousko, Repkin (BLR)
3 March 2018; 17:30	Tollbring 6	(13–15)	Claire 7	Sportzentrum Harres, St. Leon-Rot; Attendance: 2,500; Referees: Gousko, Repkin (BLR)
3 March 2018; 17:30	3× (yellow card) 1× (suspension)	Report	4× (yellow card) 1× (suspension)	Sportzentrum Harres, St. Leon-Rot; Attendance: 2,500; Referees: Gousko, Repkin (BLR)

4 March 2018; 17:00	Vardar (North Macedonia)	31–31	(Poland) Wisła Płock	Jane Sandanski Arena, Skopje; Attendance: 5,000; Referees: Horváth, Marton (HUN)
4 March 2018; 17:00	Cindrić 7	(16–16)	Duarte 10	Jane Sandanski Arena, Skopje; Attendance: 5,000; Referees: Horváth, Marton (HUN)
4 March 2018; 17:00	3× (yellow card) 5× (suspension) 1× (red card)	Report	2× (yellow card) 5× (suspension)	Jane Sandanski Arena, Skopje; Attendance: 5,000; Referees: Horváth, Marton (HUN)

4 March 2018; 17:00	Zagreb (Croatia)	24–27	(Sweden) IFK Kristianstad	Arena Zagreb, Zagreb; Attendance: 5,837; Referees: Covalciuc, Covalciuc (MDA)
4 March 2018; 17:00	Horvat 8	(10–10)	Sørensen 9	Arena Zagreb, Zagreb; Attendance: 5,837; Referees: Covalciuc, Covalciuc (MDA)
4 March 2018; 17:00	3× (yellow card) 1× (suspension)	Report	3× (yellow card) 3× (suspension)	Arena Zagreb, Zagreb; Attendance: 5,837; Referees: Covalciuc, Covalciuc (MDA)

4 March 2018; 19:15	Barcelona Lassa (Spain)	28–27	(Hungary) MOL-Pick Szeged	Palau Blaugrana, Barcelona; Attendance: 3,504; Referees: Eliasson, Palsson (ISL)
4 March 2018; 19:15	Mem 6	(16–14)	Sigurmannsson 6	Palau Blaugrana, Barcelona; Attendance: 3,504; Referees: Eliasson, Palsson (ISL)
4 March 2018; 19:15	3× (yellow card) 4× (suspension)	Report	3× (yellow card) 4× (suspension)	Palau Blaugrana, Barcelona; Attendance: 3,504; Referees: Eliasson, Palsson (ISL)

=== Group B ===
Pos	Team	Pld	W	D	L	GF	GA	GD	Pts	Qualification
1	(France) Paris Saint-Germain	14	11	1	2	424	378	+46	23	Quarterfinals
2	(Hungary) Telekom Veszprém	14	8	2	4	407	378	+29	18 (Note: Telekom Veszprém 59–58 Flensburg-Handewitt)	First knockout round
3	(Germany) Flensburg-Handewitt	14	7	4	3	410	391	+19	18	First knockout round
4	(Germany) THW Kiel	14	7	2	5	366	361	+5	16	First knockout round
5	(Poland) PGE Vive Kielce	14	6	3	5	418	408	+10	15	First knockout round
6	(Belarus) Meshkov Brest	14	4	2	8	374	406	−32	10	First knockout round
7	(Slovenia) Celje	14	3	1	10	398	434	−36	7	
8	(Denmark) Aalborg Håndbold	14	2	1	11	364	405	−41	5	

Source: EHF
Rules for classification: See Tiebreakers
Notes:

16 September 2017; 17:00	Meshkov Brest (Belarus)	28–25	(Poland) PGE Vive Kielce	Universal Sports Complex Victoria, Brest; Attendance: 2,800; Referees: Pandžić, Mosorinski (SRB)
16 September 2017; 17:00	three players 5	(15–11)	Dujshebaev 4	Universal Sports Complex Victoria, Brest; Attendance: 2,800; Referees: Pandžić, Mosorinski (SRB)
16 September 2017; 17:00	3× (yellow card) 3× (suspension) 1× (red card)	Report	3× (yellow card) 1× (suspension)	Universal Sports Complex Victoria, Brest; Attendance: 2,800; Referees: Pandžić, Mosorinski (SRB)

16 September 2017; 17:30	Celje (Slovenia)	31–39	(Hungary) Telekom Veszprem	Zlatorog Arena, Celje; Attendance: 4,185; Referees: Geipel, Helbig (GER)
16 September 2017; 17:30	Mlakar 8	(18–16)	Lékai 9	Zlatorog Arena, Celje; Attendance: 4,185; Referees: Geipel, Helbig (GER)
16 September 2017; 17:30	2× (yellow card) 3× (suspension)	Report	3× (yellow card) 6× (suspension)	Zlatorog Arena, Celje; Attendance: 4,185; Referees: Geipel, Helbig (GER)

16 September 2017; 17:30	Flensburg-Handewitt (Germany)	30–27	(Denmark) Aalborg Håndbold	Flens-Arena, Flensburg; Attendance: 3,670; Referees: Pichon, Reveret (FRA)
16 September 2017; 17:30	Glandorf 8	(13–15)	Juul 7	Flens-Arena, Flensburg; Attendance: 3,670; Referees: Pichon, Reveret (FRA)
16 September 2017; 17:30	3× (yellow card) 6× (suspension)	Report	2× (yellow card) 4× (suspension)	Flens-Arena, Flensburg; Attendance: 3,670; Referees: Pichon, Reveret (FRA)

17 September 2017; 17:15	THW Kiel (Germany)	22–25	(France) Paris Saint-Germain	Sparkassen-Arena, Kiel; Attendance: 10,049; Referees: Gubica, Milošević (CRO)
17 September 2017; 17:15	Vujin 5	(10–12)	Sagosen 6	Sparkassen-Arena, Kiel; Attendance: 10,049; Referees: Gubica, Milošević (CRO)
17 September 2017; 17:15	2× (yellow card) 3× (suspension)	Report	3× (yellow card) 3× (suspension)	Sparkassen-Arena, Kiel; Attendance: 10,049; Referees: Gubica, Milošević (CRO)

23 September 2017; 17:30	Telekom Veszprem (Hungary)	28–27	(Germany) Flensburg-Handewitt	Veszprém Aréna, Veszprém; Attendance: 5,019; Referees: Nikolić, Stojković (SRB)
23 September 2017; 17:30	Lékai 9	(15–14)	Wanne 5	Veszprém Aréna, Veszprém; Attendance: 5,019; Referees: Nikolić, Stojković (SRB)
23 September 2017; 17:30	3× (yellow card) 1× (suspension)	Report	4× (yellow card) 3× (suspension)	Veszprém Aréna, Veszprém; Attendance: 5,019; Referees: Nikolić, Stojković (SRB)

24 September 2017; 16:50	Aalborg Håndbold (Denmark)	32–30	(Slovenia) Celje	Gigantium, Aalborg; Attendance: 3,357; Referees: Brunner, Salah (SUI)
24 September 2017; 16:50	Larsen 8	(15–13)	Mlakar 14	Gigantium, Aalborg; Attendance: 3,357; Referees: Brunner, Salah (SUI)
24 September 2017; 16:50	2× (yellow card) 3× (suspension)	Report	2× (yellow card) 6× (suspension) 1× (red card)	Gigantium, Aalborg; Attendance: 3,357; Referees: Brunner, Salah (SUI)

24 September 2017; 17:00	Paris Saint-Germain (France)	32–28	(Belarus) Meshkov Brest	Stade Pierre de Coubertin, Paris; Attendance: 1,900; Referees: Pavićević, Ražnatović (MNE)
24 September 2017; 17:00	Gensheimer 7	(15–14)	Kulak, Stojković 5	Stade Pierre de Coubertin, Paris; Attendance: 1,900; Referees: Pavićević, Ražnatović (MNE)
24 September 2017; 17:00	2× (yellow card) 1× (suspension)	Report	3× (yellow card) 3× (suspension)	Stade Pierre de Coubertin, Paris; Attendance: 1,900; Referees: Pavićević, Ražnatović (MNE)

24 September 2017; 18:30	PGE Vive Kielce (Poland)	32–21	(Germany) THW Kiel	Hala Legionów, Kielce; Attendance: 4,000; Referees: Dinu, Din (ROU)
24 September 2017; 18:30	Bielecki 8	(18–11)	Dahmke 6	Hala Legionów, Kielce; Attendance: 4,000; Referees: Dinu, Din (ROU)
24 September 2017; 18:30	3× (yellow card) 4× (suspension)	Report	3× (yellow card) 3× (suspension)	Hala Legionów, Kielce; Attendance: 4,000; Referees: Dinu, Din (ROU)

27 September 2017; 18:30	THW Kiel (Germany)	27–26	(Denmark) Aalborg Håndbold	Sparkassen-Arena, Kiel; Attendance: 8,900; Referees: Lah, Sok (SLO)
27 September 2017; 18:30	Zarabec 5	(13–12)	Larsen 7	Sparkassen-Arena, Kiel; Attendance: 8,900; Referees: Lah, Sok (SLO)
27 September 2017; 18:30	3× (yellow card) 6× (suspension)	Report	2× (yellow card) 5× (suspension)	Sparkassen-Arena, Kiel; Attendance: 8,900; Referees: Lah, Sok (SLO)

30 September 2017; 16:00	Meshkov Brest (Belarus)	26–29	(Hungary) Telekom Veszprem	Universal Sports Complex Victoria, Brest; Attendance: 3,100; Referees: Marín, García (ESP)
30 September 2017; 16:00	Đorđić 7	(12–14)	Lékai 8	Universal Sports Complex Victoria, Brest; Attendance: 3,100; Referees: Marín, García (ESP)
30 September 2017; 16:00	2× (yellow card) 2× (suspension)	Report	3× (yellow card) 2× (suspension)	Universal Sports Complex Victoria, Brest; Attendance: 3,100; Referees: Marín, García (ESP)

30 September 2017; 17:30	Flensburg-Handewitt (Germany)	33–29	(France) Paris Saint-Germain	Flens-Arena, Flensburg; Attendance: 5,500; Referees: Horáček, Novotný (CZE)
30 September 2017; 17:30	Lauge Schmidt 11	(13–14)	Gensheimer 9	Flens-Arena, Flensburg; Attendance: 5,500; Referees: Horáček, Novotný (CZE)
30 September 2017; 17:30	1× (yellow card) 4× (suspension)	Report	2× (yellow card) 4× (suspension)	Flens-Arena, Flensburg; Attendance: 5,500; Referees: Horáček, Novotný (CZE)

30 September 2017; 19:00	Celje (Slovenia)	31–27	(Poland) PGE Vive Kielce	Zlatorog Arena, Celje; Attendance: 3,000; Referees: Kurtagic, Wetterwik (SWE)
30 September 2017; 19:00	Marguč 7	(16–12)	Djukić 6	Zlatorog Arena, Celje; Attendance: 3,000; Referees: Kurtagic, Wetterwik (SWE)
30 September 2017; 19:00	4× (yellow card) 8× (suspension) 1× (red card)	Report	2× (yellow card) 4× (suspension)	Zlatorog Arena, Celje; Attendance: 3,000; Referees: Kurtagic, Wetterwik (SWE)

8 October 2017; 15:00	PGE Vive Kielce (Poland)	25–25	(Germany) Flensburg-Handewitt	Hala Legionów, Kielce; Attendance: 4,018; Referees: Gubica, Milošević (CRO)
8 October 2017; 15:00	Bielecki 6	(10–10)	Steinhauser 5	Hala Legionów, Kielce; Attendance: 4,018; Referees: Gubica, Milošević (CRO)
8 October 2017; 15:00	1× (yellow card) 2× (suspension)	Report	3× (yellow card) 4× (suspension)	Hala Legionów, Kielce; Attendance: 4,018; Referees: Gubica, Milošević (CRO)

8 October 2017; 16:50	Aalborg Håndbold (Denmark)	20–23	(Belarus) Meshkov Brest	Gigantium, Aalborg; Attendance: 3,417; Referees: Sondors, Līcis (LAT)
8 October 2017; 16:50	Jensen 4	(11–10)	Đorđić 7	Gigantium, Aalborg; Attendance: 3,417; Referees: Sondors, Līcis (LAT)
8 October 2017; 16:50	4× (yellow card) 1× (suspension)	Report	2× (yellow card) 1× (suspension)	Gigantium, Aalborg; Attendance: 3,417; Referees: Sondors, Līcis (LAT)

8 October 2017; 17:00	Telekom Veszprem (Hungary)	26–24	(Germany) THW Kiel	Veszprém Aréna, Veszprém; Attendance: 5,019; Referees: Zotin, Volodkov (RUS)
8 October 2017; 17:00	Ilić 6	(12–15)	Weinhold 8	Veszprém Aréna, Veszprém; Attendance: 5,019; Referees: Zotin, Volodkov (RUS)
8 October 2017; 17:00	3× (yellow card) 3× (suspension)	Report	3× (yellow card) 1× (suspension)	Veszprém Aréna, Veszprém; Attendance: 5,019; Referees: Zotin, Volodkov (RUS)

8 October 2017; 17:00	Paris Saint-Germain (France)	32–27	(Slovenia) Celje	Stade Pierre de Coubertin, Paris; Attendance: 2,700; Referees: Santos, Fonseca (POR)
8 October 2017; 17:00	Gensheimer, Sagosen 7	(18–14)	Mlakar 10	Stade Pierre de Coubertin, Paris; Attendance: 2,700; Referees: Santos, Fonseca (POR)
8 October 2017; 17:00	2× (yellow card) 4× (suspension)	Report	3× (yellow card) 4× (suspension)	Stade Pierre de Coubertin, Paris; Attendance: 2,700; Referees: Santos, Fonseca (POR)

14 October 2017; 19:00	Celje (Slovenia)	33–33	(Belarus) Meshkov Brest	Zlatorog Arena, Celje; Attendance: 3,000; Referees: Elíasson, Pálsson (ISL)
14 October 2017; 19:00	Malus 7	(18–15)	Nikulenkau 7	Zlatorog Arena, Celje; Attendance: 3,000; Referees: Elíasson, Pálsson (ISL)
14 October 2017; 19:00	3× (yellow card) 4× (suspension)	Report	4× (yellow card) 5× (suspension)	Zlatorog Arena, Celje; Attendance: 3,000; Referees: Elíasson, Pálsson (ISL)

15 October 2017; 16:50	Aalborg Håndbold (Denmark)	26–33	(France) Paris Saint-Germain	Gigantium, Aalborg; Attendance: 5,020; Referees: Dinu, Din (ROU)
15 October 2017; 16:50	Juul 6	(11–18)	Gensheimer 5	Gigantium, Aalborg; Attendance: 5,020; Referees: Dinu, Din (ROU)
15 October 2017; 16:50	2× (yellow card) 5× (suspension)	Report	2× (yellow card) 7× (suspension)	Gigantium, Aalborg; Attendance: 5,020; Referees: Dinu, Din (ROU)

15 October 2017; 18:30	THW Kiel (Germany)	20–20	(Germany) Flensburg-Handewitt	Sparkassen-Arena, Kiel; Attendance: 10,049; Referees: Marín, García (ESP)
15 October 2017; 18:30	Vujin 5	(9–7)	Mahé, Svan 4	Sparkassen-Arena, Kiel; Attendance: 10,049; Referees: Marín, García (ESP)
15 October 2017; 18:30	3× (yellow card) 4× (suspension)	Report	2× (yellow card) 3× (suspension)	Sparkassen-Arena, Kiel; Attendance: 10,049; Referees: Marín, García (ESP)

15 October 2017; 19:00	PGE Vive Kielce (Poland)	32–32	(Hungary) Telekom Veszprem	Hala Legionów, Kielce; Attendance: 4,200; Referees: Nikolov, Nachevski (MKD)
15 October 2017; 19:00	Dujshebaev 7	(16–15)	Tønnesen 6	Hala Legionów, Kielce; Attendance: 4,200; Referees: Nikolov, Nachevski (MKD)
15 October 2017; 19:00	3× (yellow card) 4× (suspension)	Report	3× (yellow card) 5× (suspension)	Hala Legionów, Kielce; Attendance: 4,200; Referees: Nikolov, Nachevski (MKD)

1 November 2017; 18:30	Flensburg-Handewitt (Germany)	33–28	(Slovenia) Celje	Flens-Arena, Flensburg; Attendance: 4,016; Referees: Gjeding, Hansen (DEN)
1 November 2017; 18:30	Svan 7	(16–15)	Vujović 9	Flens-Arena, Flensburg; Attendance: 4,016; Referees: Gjeding, Hansen (DEN)
1 November 2017; 18:30	2× (yellow card) 4× (suspension)	Report	1× (yellow card) 4× (suspension)	Flens-Arena, Flensburg; Attendance: 4,016; Referees: Gjeding, Hansen (DEN)

4 November 2017; 17:30	Telekom Veszprem (Hungary)	30–24	(Denmark) Aalborg Håndbold	Veszprém Aréna, Veszprém; Attendance: 5,019; Referees: Vešović, Mitrović (MNE)
4 November 2017; 17:30	Lékai 7	(16–10)	Hald 6	Veszprém Aréna, Veszprém; Attendance: 5,019; Referees: Vešović, Mitrović (MNE)
4 November 2017; 17:30	4× (yellow card) 5× (suspension) 2× (red card)	Report	3× (yellow card) 4× (suspension)	Veszprém Aréna, Veszprém; Attendance: 5,019; Referees: Vešović, Mitrović (MNE)

4 November 2017; 18:30	Meshkov Brest (Belarus)	24–25	(Germany) THW Kiel	Universal Sports Complex Victoria, Brest; Attendance: 3,450; Referees: Mažeika, Gatelis (LTU)
4 November 2017; 18:30	Shylovich 6	(14–12)	Bilyk, Vujin 6	Universal Sports Complex Victoria, Brest; Attendance: 3,450; Referees: Mažeika, Gatelis (LTU)
4 November 2017; 18:30	3× (yellow card) 3× (suspension)	Report	3× (yellow card) 3× (suspension)	Universal Sports Complex Victoria, Brest; Attendance: 3,450; Referees: Mažeika, Gatelis (LTU)

5 November 2017; 17:00	Paris Saint-Germain (France)	33–28	(Poland) PGE Vive Kielce	Stade Pierre de Coubertin, Paris; Attendance: 2,837; Referees: López, Ramírez (ESP)
5 November 2017; 17:00	Remili 7	(18–16)	Dujshebaev 5	Stade Pierre de Coubertin, Paris; Attendance: 2,837; Referees: López, Ramírez (ESP)
5 November 2017; 17:00	3× (yellow card) 1× (suspension)	Report	2× (yellow card) 2× (suspension)	Stade Pierre de Coubertin, Paris; Attendance: 2,837; Referees: López, Ramírez (ESP)

11 November 2017; 18:30	Meshkov Brest (Belarus)	28–30	(Germany) Flensburg-Handewitt	Universal Sports Complex Victoria, Brest; Attendance: 3,250; Referees: Brunner, Salah (SUI)
11 November 2017; 18:30	Stojković 6	(15–16)	Wanne 7	Universal Sports Complex Victoria, Brest; Attendance: 3,250; Referees: Brunner, Salah (SUI)
11 November 2017; 18:30	3× (yellow card) 3× (suspension)	Report	3× (yellow card) 2× (suspension)	Universal Sports Complex Victoria, Brest; Attendance: 3,250; Referees: Brunner, Salah (SUI)

12 November 2017; 16:50	Aalborg Håndbold (Denmark)	30–34	(Poland) PGE Vive Kielce	Gigantium, Aalborg; Attendance: 3,454; Referees: Nikolić, Stojković (SRB)
12 November 2017; 16:50	Smárason 8	(14–18)	Aguinagalde, Jurecki 5	Gigantium, Aalborg; Attendance: 3,454; Referees: Nikolić, Stojković (SRB)
12 November 2017; 16:50	3× (yellow card) 1× (suspension)	Report	3× (yellow card) 3× (suspension)	Gigantium, Aalborg; Attendance: 3,454; Referees: Nikolić, Stojković (SRB)

12 November 2017; 17:00	THW Kiel (Germany)	26–29	(Slovenia) Celje	Sparkassen-Arena, Kiel; Attendance: 8,700; Referees: Horváth, Marton (HUN)
12 November 2017; 17:00	Ekberg 6	(15–14)	Malus 8	Sparkassen-Arena, Kiel; Attendance: 8,700; Referees: Horváth, Marton (HUN)
12 November 2017; 17:00	3× (yellow card) 2× (suspension)	Report	2× (yellow card) 5× (suspension)	Sparkassen-Arena, Kiel; Attendance: 8,700; Referees: Horváth, Marton (HUN)

12 November 2017; 17:00	Paris Saint-Germain (France)	33–28	(Hungary) Telekom Veszprem	Stade Pierre de Coubertin, Paris; Attendance: 2,800; Referees: Gjeding, Hansen (DEN)
12 November 2017; 17:00	Karabatić 8	(19–14)	Gajić, Tønnesen 5	Stade Pierre de Coubertin, Paris; Attendance: 2,800; Referees: Gjeding, Hansen (DEN)
12 November 2017; 17:00	2× (yellow card) 7× (suspension)	Report	2× (yellow card) 7× (suspension)	Stade Pierre de Coubertin, Paris; Attendance: 2,800; Referees: Gjeding, Hansen (DEN)

18 November 2017; 16:00	PGE Vive Kielce (Poland)	28–27	(Denmark) Aalborg Håndbold	Hala Legionów, Kielce; Attendance: 4,000; Referees: Mažeika, Gatelis (LTU)
18 November 2017; 16:00	Bielecki 7	(15–14)	Smárason 6	Hala Legionów, Kielce; Attendance: 4,000; Referees: Mažeika, Gatelis (LTU)
18 November 2017; 16:00	2× (yellow card) 1× (suspension)	Report	3× (yellow card) 5× (suspension)	Hala Legionów, Kielce; Attendance: 4,000; Referees: Mažeika, Gatelis (LTU)

18 November 2017; 17:30	Telekom Veszprem (Hungary)	24–29	(France) Paris Saint-Germain	Veszprém Aréna, Veszprém; Attendance: 5,019; Referees: Sondors, Līcis (LAT)
18 November 2017; 17:30	Lékai 8	(12–12)	Gensheimer 10	Veszprém Aréna, Veszprém; Attendance: 5,019; Referees: Sondors, Līcis (LAT)
18 November 2017; 17:30	3× (yellow card) 4× (suspension)	Report	1× (yellow card) 1× (suspension)	Veszprém Aréna, Veszprém; Attendance: 5,019; Referees: Sondors, Līcis (LAT)

19 November 2017; 17:00	Celje (Slovenia)	27–28	(Germany) THW Kiel	Zlatorog Arena, Celje; Attendance: 4,600; Referees: Caçador, Nicolau (POR)
19 November 2017; 17:00	Marguč, Vujović 5	(14–15)	Ekberg 7	Zlatorog Arena, Celje; Attendance: 4,600; Referees: Caçador, Nicolau (POR)
19 November 2017; 17:00	3× (yellow card) 4× (suspension)	Report	3× (yellow card) 5× (suspension)	Zlatorog Arena, Celje; Attendance: 4,600; Referees: Caçador, Nicolau (POR)

19 November 2017; 19:00	Flensburg-Handewitt (Germany)	37–30	(Belarus) Meshkov Brest	Flens-Arena, Flensburg; Attendance: 3,855; Referees: Santos, Fonseca (POR)
19 November 2017; 19:00	Glandorf 9	(20–13)	Shkurinskiy 6	Flens-Arena, Flensburg; Attendance: 3,855; Referees: Santos, Fonseca (POR)
19 November 2017; 19:00	2× (yellow card) 6× (suspension)	Report	2× (yellow card) 4× (suspension)	Flens-Arena, Flensburg; Attendance: 3,855; Referees: Santos, Fonseca (POR)

25 November 2017; 17:30	THW Kiel (Germany)	33–23	(Belarus) Meshkov Brest	Sparkassen-Arena, Kiel; Attendance: 9,000; Referees: Nikolov, Nachevski (MKD)
25 November 2017; 17:30	Wiencek 7	(15–10)	Kulak 5	Sparkassen-Arena, Kiel; Attendance: 9,000; Referees: Nikolov, Nachevski (MKD)
25 November 2017; 17:30	3× (yellow card) 2× (suspension)	Report	3× (yellow card) 3× (suspension)	Sparkassen-Arena, Kiel; Attendance: 9,000; Referees: Nikolov, Nachevski (MKD)

26 November 2017; 16:50	Aalborg Håndbold (Denmark)	29–26	(Hungary) Telekom Veszprem	Gigantium, Aalborg; Attendance: 3,267; Referees: Gubica, Milošević (CRO)
26 November 2017; 16:50	Jensen 6	(14–13)	Lékai 6	Gigantium, Aalborg; Attendance: 3,267; Referees: Gubica, Milošević (CRO)
26 November 2017; 16:50	3× (yellow card) 3× (suspension)	Report	3× (yellow card) 5× (suspension)	Gigantium, Aalborg; Attendance: 3,267; Referees: Gubica, Milošević (CRO)

26 November 2017; 17:00	Celje (Slovenia)	27–30	(Germany) Flensburg Handewitt	Zlatorog Arena, Celje; Attendance: 3,350; Referees: Dinu, Din (ROU)
26 November 2017; 17:00	Jurečič 7	(14–16)	Jeppsson, Steinhauser 6	Zlatorog Arena, Celje; Attendance: 3,350; Referees: Dinu, Din (ROU)
26 November 2017; 17:00	3× (yellow card) 4× (suspension)	Report	3× (yellow card) 6× (suspension)	Zlatorog Arena, Celje; Attendance: 3,350; Referees: Dinu, Din (ROU)

26 November 2017; 19:00	PGE Vive Kielce (Poland)	29–30	(France) Paris Saint-Germain	Hala Legionów, Kielce; Attendance: 4,200; Referees: Geipel, Helbig (GER)
26 November 2017; 19:00	Aguinagalde, Dujshebaev 5	(11–15)	Gensheimer 8	Hala Legionów, Kielce; Attendance: 4,200; Referees: Geipel, Helbig (GER)
26 November 2017; 19:00	1× (yellow card) 6× (suspension)	Report	2× (yellow card) 7× (suspension) 2× (red card)	Hala Legionów, Kielce; Attendance: 4,200; Referees: Geipel, Helbig (GER)

29 November 2017; 19:30	Flensburg-Handewitt (Germany)	30–33	(Germany) THW Kiel	Flens-Arena, Flensburg; Attendance: 6,000; Referees: Nikolić, Stojković (SRB)
29 November 2017; 19:30	Wanne 7	(15–16)	Dissinger 7	Flens-Arena, Flensburg; Attendance: 6,000; Referees: Nikolić, Stojković (SRB)
29 November 2017; 19:30	3× (yellow card) 1× (suspension) 1× (red card)	Report	3× (yellow card) 4× (suspension)	Flens-Arena, Flensburg; Attendance: 6,000; Referees: Nikolić, Stojković (SRB)

2 December 2017; 17:15	Meshkov Brest (Belarus)	29–24	(Slovenia) Celje	Universal Sports Complex Victoria, Brest; Attendance: 3,100; Referees: Pichon, Reveret (FRA)
2 December 2017; 17:15	Rutenka 4	(15–14)	Dujshebaev 7	Universal Sports Complex Victoria, Brest; Attendance: 3,100; Referees: Pichon, Reveret (FRA)
2 December 2017; 17:15	3× (yellow card) 1× (suspension)	Report	2× (yellow card) 4× (suspension)	Universal Sports Complex Victoria, Brest; Attendance: 3,100; Referees: Pichon, Reveret (FRA)

2 December 2017; 17:30	Paris Saint-Germain (France)	31–28	(Denmark) Aalborg Håndbold	Stade Pierre de Coubertin, Paris; Attendance: 2,740; Referees: Baranowski, Lemanowicz (POL)
2 December 2017; 17:30	Gensheimer 10	(16–14)	Jensen 9	Stade Pierre de Coubertin, Paris; Attendance: 2,740; Referees: Baranowski, Lemanowicz (POL)
2 December 2017; 17:30	3× (yellow card) 3× (suspension)	Report	4× (yellow card) 4× (suspension)	Stade Pierre de Coubertin, Paris; Attendance: 2,740; Referees: Baranowski, Lemanowicz (POL)

2 December 2017; 18:00	Telekom Veszprem (Hungary)	31–26	(Poland) PGE Vive Kielce	Veszprém Aréna, Veszprém; Attendance: 5,080; Referees: Horáček, Novotný (CZE)
2 December 2017; 18:00	Nilsson 8	(15–15)	Jurecki 9	Veszprém Aréna, Veszprém; Attendance: 5,080; Referees: Horáček, Novotný (CZE)
2 December 2017; 18:00	2× (yellow card) 7× (suspension)	Report	4× (yellow card) 4× (suspension)	Veszprém Aréna, Veszprém; Attendance: 5,080; Referees: Horáček, Novotný (CZE)

7 February 2018; 18:00	Meshkov Brest (Belarus)	23–23	(Denmark) Aalborg Håndbold	Universal Sports Complex Victoria, Brest; Attendance: 3,150; Referees: Baumgart, Wild (GER)
7 February 2018; 18:00	Đorđić 5	(10–12)	Ellebæk 5	Universal Sports Complex Victoria, Brest; Attendance: 3,150; Referees: Baumgart, Wild (GER)
7 February 2018; 18:00	3× (yellow card) 3× (suspension)	Report	3× (yellow card) 3× (suspension)	Universal Sports Complex Victoria, Brest; Attendance: 3,150; Referees: Baumgart, Wild (GER)

7 February 2018; 19:30	THW Kiel (Germany)	22–20	(Hungary) Telekom Veszprem	Sparkassen-Arena, Kiel; Attendance: 9,500; Referees: Brunovský, Čanda (SVK)
7 February 2018; 19:30	Ekberg, Nilsson 7	(14–9)	Ilić 5	Sparkassen-Arena, Kiel; Attendance: 9,500; Referees: Brunovský, Čanda (SVK)
7 February 2018; 19:30	1× (yellow card) 4× (suspension)	Report	3× (yellow card) 4× (suspension)	Sparkassen-Arena, Kiel; Attendance: 9,500; Referees: Brunovský, Čanda (SVK)

11 February 2018; 17:00	Celje (Slovenia)	26–31	(France) Paris Saint-Germain	Zlatorog Arena, Celje; Attendance: 5,600; Referees: Marín, García (ESP)
11 February 2018; 17:00	Mačkovšek 7	(13–17)	Gensheimer 7	Zlatorog Arena, Celje; Attendance: 5,600; Referees: Marín, García (ESP)
11 February 2018; 17:00	3× (yellow card) 4× (suspension)	Report	3× (yellow card) 5× (suspension)	Zlatorog Arena, Celje; Attendance: 5,600; Referees: Marín, García (ESP)

11 February 2018; 19:00	Flensburg-Handewitt (Germany)	32–32	(Poland) PGE Vive Kielce	Flens-Arena, Flensburg; Attendance: 5,314; Referees: Caçador, Nicolau (POR)
11 February 2018; 19:00	Lauge Schmidt 9	(17–21)	Jurecki 8	Flens-Arena, Flensburg; Attendance: 5,314; Referees: Caçador, Nicolau (POR)
11 February 2018; 19:00	2× (yellow card) 4× (suspension)	Report	2× (yellow card) 3× (suspension)	Flens-Arena, Flensburg; Attendance: 5,314; Referees: Caçador, Nicolau (POR)

17 February 2018; 16:00	PGE Vive Kielce (Poland)	37–31	(Slovenia) Celje	Hala Legionów, Kielce; Attendance: 4,100; Referees: Brunner, Salah (SUI)
17 February 2018; 16:00	Štrlek 6	(21–17)	Anić 6	Hala Legionów, Kielce; Attendance: 4,100; Referees: Brunner, Salah (SUI)
17 February 2018; 16:00	1× (yellow card) 5× (suspension)	Report	2× (yellow card) 5× (suspension)	Hala Legionów, Kielce; Attendance: 4,100; Referees: Brunner, Salah (SUI)

17 February 2018; 17:30	Telekom Veszprem (Hungary)	34–22	(Belarus) Meshkov Brest	Veszprém Aréna, Veszprém; Attendance: 5,000; Referees: Konjičanin, Konjičanin (BIH)
17 February 2018; 17:30	Ilić 8	(20–11)	Astrashapkin, Stojković 3	Veszprém Aréna, Veszprém; Attendance: 5,000; Referees: Konjičanin, Konjičanin (BIH)
17 February 2018; 17:30	2× (yellow card) 4× (suspension)	Report	2× (yellow card) 1× (suspension)	Veszprém Aréna, Veszprém; Attendance: 5,000; Referees: Konjičanin, Konjičanin (BIH)

17 February 2018; 17:30	Paris Saint-Germain (France)	29–21	(Germany) Flensburg-Handewitt	Stade Pierre de Coubertin, Paris; Attendance: 3,500; Referees: Mažeika, Gatelis (LTU)
17 February 2018; 17:30	Gensheimer, N. Karabatić 5	(19–10)	Mahé, Rød 6	Stade Pierre de Coubertin, Paris; Attendance: 3,500; Referees: Mažeika, Gatelis (LTU)
17 February 2018; 17:30	2× (yellow card) 3× (suspension)	Report	3× (yellow card) 2× (suspension)	Stade Pierre de Coubertin, Paris; Attendance: 3,500; Referees: Mažeika, Gatelis (LTU)

18 February 2018; 16:50	Aalborg Håndbold (Denmark)	20–27	(Germany) THW Kiel	Gigantium, Aalborg; Attendance: 3,874; Referees: Pichon, Reveret (FRA)
18 February 2018; 16:50	Ellebæk 7	(11–15)	Ekberg 7	Gigantium, Aalborg; Attendance: 3,874; Referees: Pichon, Reveret (FRA)
18 February 2018; 16:50	3× (yellow card) 1× (suspension)	Report	3× (yellow card) 4× (suspension)	Gigantium, Aalborg; Attendance: 3,874; Referees: Pichon, Reveret (FRA)

24 February 2018; 17:30	THW Kiel (Germany)	29–30	(Poland) PGE Vive Kielce	Sparkassen-Arena, Kiel; Attendance: 10,285; Referees: Gubica, Milošević (CRO)
24 February 2018; 17:30	Wiencek 6	(17–16)	Jurecki 8	Sparkassen-Arena, Kiel; Attendance: 10,285; Referees: Gubica, Milošević (CRO)
24 February 2018; 17:30	4× (yellow card) 2× (suspension)	Report	2× (yellow card) 3× (suspension)	Sparkassen-Arena, Kiel; Attendance: 10,285; Referees: Gubica, Milošević (CRO)

24 February 2018; 18:30	Meshkov Brest (Belarus)	29–28	(France) Paris Saint-Germain	Universal Sports Complex Victoria, Brest; Attendance: 3,740; Referees: Nikolov, Nachevski (MKD)
24 February 2018; 18:30	Đorđić 10	(19–13)	three players 4	Universal Sports Complex Victoria, Brest; Attendance: 3,740; Referees: Nikolov, Nachevski (MKD)
24 February 2018; 18:30	3× (yellow card) 2× (suspension)	Report	3× (yellow card) 1× (suspension)	Universal Sports Complex Victoria, Brest; Attendance: 3,740; Referees: Nikolov, Nachevski (MKD)

24 February 2018; 19:30	Celje (Slovenia)	32–28	(Denmark) Aalborg Håndbold	Zlatorog Arena, Celje; Attendance: 2,370; Referees: Pavićević, Ražnatović (MNE)
24 February 2018; 19:30	Mačkovšek 8	(15–12)	Saugstrup 5	Zlatorog Arena, Celje; Attendance: 2,370; Referees: Pavićević, Ražnatović (MNE)
24 February 2018; 19:30	2× (yellow card) 4× (suspension)	Report	3× (yellow card) 5× (suspension)	Zlatorog Arena, Celje; Attendance: 2,370; Referees: Pavićević, Ražnatović (MNE)

25 February 2018; 17:00	Flensburg-Handewitt (Germany)	31–31	(Hungary) Telekom Veszprem	Flens-Arena, Flensburg; Attendance: 5,500; Referees: López, Ramírez (ESP)
25 February 2018; 17:00	four players 5	(16–16)	Gajić, Marguč 5	Flens-Arena, Flensburg; Attendance: 5,500; Referees: López, Ramírez (ESP)
25 February 2018; 17:00	3× (yellow card) 3× (suspension) 1× (red card)	Report	2× (yellow card) 5× (suspension)	Flens-Arena, Flensburg; Attendance: 5,500; Referees: López, Ramírez (ESP)

3 March 2018; 16:00	PGE Vive Kielce (Poland)	33–28	(Belarus) Meshkov Brest	Hala Legionów, Kielce; Attendance: 4,060; Referees: Marin, García (ESP)
3 March 2018; 16:00	Dujshebaev 6	(20–17)	Shylovich 6	Hala Legionów, Kielce; Attendance: 4,060; Referees: Marin, García (ESP)
3 March 2018; 16:00	2× (yellow card) 4× (suspension)	Report	2× (yellow card) 4× (suspension)	Hala Legionów, Kielce; Attendance: 4,060; Referees: Marin, García (ESP)

3 March 2018; 17:30	Telekom Veszprem (Hungary)	29–22	(Slovenia) Celje	Veszprém Aréna, Veszprém; Attendance: 5,019; Referees: Brkic, Jusufhodzic (AUT)
3 March 2018; 17:30	Lékai 6	(13–11)	Malus 6	Veszprém Aréna, Veszprém; Attendance: 5,019; Referees: Brkic, Jusufhodzic (AUT)
3 March 2018; 17:30	3× (yellow card) 5× (suspension)	Report	3× (yellow card) 1× (suspension)	Veszprém Aréna, Veszprém; Attendance: 5,019; Referees: Brkic, Jusufhodzic (AUT)

4 March 2018; 16:50	Aalborg Håndbold (Denmark)	24–31	(Germany) Flensburg-Handewitt	Gigantium, Aalborg; Attendance: 4,327; Referees: Baďura, Ondogrecula (SVK)
4 March 2018; 16:50	Larsen 7	(11–15)	Glandorf 6	Gigantium, Aalborg; Attendance: 4,327; Referees: Baďura, Ondogrecula (SVK)
4 March 2018; 16:50	3× (yellow card) 3× (suspension)	Report	2× (yellow card) 5× (suspension)	Gigantium, Aalborg; Attendance: 4,327; Referees: Baďura, Ondogrecula (SVK)

4 March 2018; 19:00	Paris Saint-Germain (France)	29–29	(Germany) THW Kiel	Stade Pierre de Coubertin, Paris; Attendance: 3,300; Referees: Sondors, Līcis (LAT)
4 March 2018; 19:00	Remili 5	(16–11)	Vujin 11	Stade Pierre de Coubertin, Paris; Attendance: 3,300; Referees: Sondors, Līcis (LAT)
4 March 2018; 19:00	3× (yellow card) 7× (suspension) 1× (red card)	Report	2× (yellow card) 7× (suspension) 1× (red card)	Stade Pierre de Coubertin, Paris; Attendance: 3,300; Referees: Sondors, Līcis (LAT)

=== Group C ===
Pos	Team	Pld	W	D	L	GF	GA	GD	Pts	Qualification
1	(Denmark) Skjern Håndbold	10	8	0	2	326	252	+74	16	Playoffs
2	(Spain) CB Ademar León	10	6	0	4	270	270	0	12 (Note: CB Ademar León 50–47 RK Gorenje Velenje)	Playoffs
3	(Slovenia) RK Gorenje Velenje	10	6	0	4	271	271	0	12	
4	(Norway) Elverum Håndball	10	5	0	5	287	304	−17	10	
5	(Switzerland) Kadetten Schaffhausen	10	4	0	6	263	274	−11	8	
6	(Romania) Dinamo București	10	1	0	9	278	324	−46	2	

Source: EHF
Rules for classification: See Tiebreakers
Notes:

14 September 2017; 20:15	Kadetten Schaffhausen (Switzerland)	36–30	(Norway) Elverum Håndball	BBC-Arena, Schaffhausen; Attendance: 1,050; Referees: Gasmi, Gasmi (FRA)
14 September 2017; 20:15	Maros 6	(17–15)	Gulliksen 8	BBC-Arena, Schaffhausen; Attendance: 1,050; Referees: Gasmi, Gasmi (FRA)
14 September 2017; 20:15	2× (yellow card) 6× (suspension)	Report	2× (yellow card) 1× (suspension)	BBC-Arena, Schaffhausen; Attendance: 1,050; Referees: Gasmi, Gasmi (FRA)

17 September 2017; 16:50	Skjern Håndbold (Denmark)	39–28	(Romania) Dinamo București	Skjern Bank Arena, Skjern; Attendance: 1,120; Referees: Baranowski, Lemanowicz (POL)
17 September 2017; 16:50	Konradsson, Olsson 6	(19–11)	Gayduchenko 6	Skjern Bank Arena, Skjern; Attendance: 1,120; Referees: Baranowski, Lemanowicz (POL)
17 September 2017; 16:50	3× (yellow card) 3× (suspension)	Report	3× (yellow card) 4× (suspension)	Skjern Bank Arena, Skjern; Attendance: 1,120; Referees: Baranowski, Lemanowicz (POL)

17 September 2017; 17:00	RK Gorenje Velenje (Slovenia)	23–22	(Spain) CB Ademar León	Red Hall, Velenje; Attendance: 1,000; Referees: Kiyashko, Kiselev (RUS)
17 September 2017; 17:00	Grebenc, Medved 6	(12–10)	García 7	Red Hall, Velenje; Attendance: 1,000; Referees: Kiyashko, Kiselev (RUS)
17 September 2017; 17:00	2× (yellow card) 3× (suspension)	Report	3× (yellow card) 1× (suspension)	Red Hall, Velenje; Attendance: 1,000; Referees: Kiyashko, Kiselev (RUS)

23 September 2017; 17:00	Elverum Håndball (Norway)	27–32	(Denmark) Skjern Håndbold	Terningen Arena, Elverum; Attendance: 1,790; Referees: Schulze, Tönnies (GER)
23 September 2017; 17:00	Gullisken 6	(11–17)	Eggert, Rasmussen 7	Terningen Arena, Elverum; Attendance: 1,790; Referees: Schulze, Tönnies (GER)
23 September 2017; 17:00	2× (yellow card) 2× (suspension)	Report	2× (yellow card) 4× (suspension)	Terningen Arena, Elverum; Attendance: 1,790; Referees: Schulze, Tönnies (GER)

23 September 2017; 19:00	Dinamo București (Romania)	26–27	(Slovenia) RK Gorenje Velenje	Dinamo Polyvalent Hall, Bucharest; Attendance: 1,500; Referees: Brkic, Jusufhodzic (AUT)
23 September 2017; 19:00	Descat, Gayduchenko 5	(10–9)	Brumen 8	Dinamo Polyvalent Hall, Bucharest; Attendance: 1,500; Referees: Brkic, Jusufhodzic (AUT)
23 September 2017; 19:00	3× (yellow card) 2× (suspension)	Report	3× (yellow card) 2× (suspension)	Dinamo Polyvalent Hall, Bucharest; Attendance: 1,500; Referees: Brkic, Jusufhodzic (AUT)

24 September 2017; 17:00	CB Ademar León (Spain)	29–28	(Switzerland) Kadetten Schaffhausen	Palacio de los Deportes de León, León; Attendance: 2,500; Referees: Mandák, Rudinský (SVK)
24 September 2017; 17:00	Costoya 7	(14–13)	Ostroushko 6	Palacio de los Deportes de León, León; Attendance: 2,500; Referees: Mandák, Rudinský (SVK)
24 September 2017; 17:00	3× (yellow card) 3× (suspension)	Report	4× (yellow card) 5× (suspension)	Palacio de los Deportes de León, León; Attendance: 2,500; Referees: Mandák, Rudinský (SVK)

27 September 2017; 18:00	Dinamo București (Romania)	29–28	(Switzerland) Kadetten Schaffhausen	Dinamo Polyvalent Hall, Bucharest; Attendance: 1,700; Referees: Konjičanin, Konjičanin (BIH)
27 September 2017; 18:00	Descat, Esteki 5	(14–12)	Liniger 10	Dinamo Polyvalent Hall, Bucharest; Attendance: 1,700; Referees: Konjičanin, Konjičanin (BIH)
27 September 2017; 18:00	2× (yellow card) 4× (suspension)	Report	2× (yellow card) 1× (suspension)	Dinamo Polyvalent Hall, Bucharest; Attendance: 1,700; Referees: Konjičanin, Konjičanin (BIH)

30 September 2017; 19:30	CB Ademar León (Spain)	26–30	(Norway) Elverum Håndball	Palacio de los Deportes de León, León; Attendance: 2,500; Referees: Freitas, Carvalho (POR)
30 September 2017; 19:30	three players 4	(10–12)	Frederiksen 6	Palacio de los Deportes de León, León; Attendance: 2,500; Referees: Freitas, Carvalho (POR)
30 September 2017; 19:30	2× (yellow card) 2× (suspension)	Report	2× (yellow card) 4× (suspension)	Palacio de los Deportes de León, León; Attendance: 2,500; Referees: Freitas, Carvalho (POR)

1 October 2017; 17:00	RK Gorenje Velenje (Slovenia)	31–29	(Denmark) Skjern Håndbold	Red Hall, Velenje; Attendance: 2,500; Referees: Tzaferopoulos, Bethmann (GRE)
1 October 2017; 17:00	Medved, Toskić 5	(15-14)	Olsson 9	Red Hall, Velenje; Attendance: 2,500; Referees: Tzaferopoulos, Bethmann (GRE)
1 October 2017; 17:00	3× (yellow card) 5× (suspension)	Report	3× (yellow card) 5× (suspension)	Red Hall, Velenje; Attendance: 2,500; Referees: Tzaferopoulos, Bethmann (GRE)

5 October 2017; 20:15	Kadetten Schaffhausen (Switzerland)	31–28	(Slovenia) RK Gorenje Velenje	BBC-Arena, Schaffhausen; Attendance: 3,500; Referees: Covalciuc, Covalciuc (MDA)
5 October 2017; 20:15	Császár 9	(14–14)	Grebenc 6	BBC-Arena, Schaffhausen; Attendance: 3,500; Referees: Covalciuc, Covalciuc (MDA)
5 October 2017; 20:15	2× (yellow card) 7× (suspension)	Report	3× (yellow card) 3× (suspension)	BBC-Arena, Schaffhausen; Attendance: 3,500; Referees: Covalciuc, Covalciuc (MDA)

8 October 2017; 15:10	Skjern Håndbold (Denmark)	33–25	(Spain) CB Ademar León	Skjern Bank Arena, Skjern; Attendance: 2,810; Referees: Nabokau, Kulik (BLR)
8 October 2017; 15:10	Eggert, Olsson 8	(18–15)	Costoya, López 5	Skjern Bank Arena, Skjern; Attendance: 2,810; Referees: Nabokau, Kulik (BLR)
8 October 2017; 15:10	1× (yellow card) 3× (suspension)	Report	4× (yellow card) 3× (suspension)	Skjern Bank Arena, Skjern; Attendance: 2,810; Referees: Nabokau, Kulik (BLR)

8 October 2017; 17:00	Elverum Håndball (Norway)	40–32	(Romania) Dinamo București	Terningen Arena, Elverum; Attendance: 1,760; Referees: Andorka, Hucker (HUN)
8 October 2017; 17:00	Lindboe 8	(19–15)	Mocanu 10	Terningen Arena, Elverum; Attendance: 1,760; Referees: Andorka, Hucker (HUN)
8 October 2017; 17:00	1× (yellow card) 2× (suspension)	Report	2× (yellow card) 3× (suspension)	Terningen Arena, Elverum; Attendance: 1,760; Referees: Andorka, Hucker (HUN)

12 October 2017; 20:15	Kadetten Schaffhausen (Switzerland)	25–24	(Denmark) Skjern Håndbold	BBC-Arena, Schaffhausen; Attendance: 1,190; Referees: Bonifert, Oláh (HUN)
12 October 2017; 20:15	Császár 9	(9–13)	Olsson 6	BBC-Arena, Schaffhausen; Attendance: 1,190; Referees: Bonifert, Oláh (HUN)
12 October 2017; 20:15	3× (yellow card) 4× (suspension)	Report	2× (yellow card) 3× (suspension)	BBC-Arena, Schaffhausen; Attendance: 1,190; Referees: Bonifert, Oláh (HUN)

15 October 2017; 17:00	Dinamo București (Romania)	24–28	(Spain) CB Ademar León	Dinamo Polyvalent Hall, Bucharest; Attendance: 1,500; Referees: Erdoğan, Özdeniz (TUR)
15 October 2017; 17:00	Descat, Gavriloaia 5	(13–17)	Fernández, Vieyra 6	Dinamo Polyvalent Hall, Bucharest; Attendance: 1,500; Referees: Erdoğan, Özdeniz (TUR)
15 October 2017; 17:00	2× (yellow card) 5× (suspension)	Report	2× (yellow card) 1× (suspension)	Dinamo Polyvalent Hall, Bucharest; Attendance: 1,500; Referees: Erdoğan, Özdeniz (TUR)

15 October 2017; 17:00	Elverum Håndball (Norway)	29–28	(Slovenia) RK Gorenje Velenje	Terningen Arena, Elverum; Attendance: 2,270; Referees: Panayides, Andreou (CYP)
15 October 2017; 17:00	Mehl 5	(17–14)	Cehte 9	Terningen Arena, Elverum; Attendance: 2,270; Referees: Panayides, Andreou (CYP)
15 October 2017; 17:00	3× (yellow card) 1× (suspension)	Report	4× (yellow card) 3× (suspension)	Terningen Arena, Elverum; Attendance: 2,270; Referees: Panayides, Andreou (CYP)

4 November 2017; 19:30	CB Ademar León (Spain)	32–29	(Romania) Dinamo București	Palacio de los Deportes de León, León; Attendance: 3,000; Referees: Baumgart, Wild (GER)
4 November 2017; 19:30	Fernández 9	(18–15)	Gayduchenko 8	Palacio de los Deportes de León, León; Attendance: 3,000; Referees: Baumgart, Wild (GER)
4 November 2017; 19:30	2× (yellow card) 3× (suspension)	Report	6× (suspension)	Palacio de los Deportes de León, León; Attendance: 3,000; Referees: Baumgart, Wild (GER)

4 November 2017; 19:30	RK Gorenje Velenje (Slovenia)	30–21	(Norway) Elverum Håndball	Red Hall, Velenje; Attendance: 1,200; Referees: Kouz, Zhoba (UKR)
4 November 2017; 19:30	Ovniček 7	(14–12)	Hanisch 4	Red Hall, Velenje; Attendance: 1,200; Referees: Kouz, Zhoba (UKR)
4 November 2017; 19:30	1× (yellow card) 5× (suspension)	Report	2× (yellow card) 2× (suspension) 2× (red card)	Red Hall, Velenje; Attendance: 1,200; Referees: Kouz, Zhoba (UKR)

5 November 2017; 16:50	Skjern Håndbold (Denmark)	32–22	(Switzerland) Kadetten Schaffhausen	Skjern Bank Arena, Skjern; Attendance: 2,863; Referees: Leandersson, Lindroos (FIN)
5 November 2017; 16:50	Eggert 7	(13–13)	Császár 6	Skjern Bank Arena, Skjern; Attendance: 2,863; Referees: Leandersson, Lindroos (FIN)
5 November 2017; 16:50	4× (yellow card) 4× (suspension)	Report	3× (yellow card) 7× (suspension) 1× (red card)	Skjern Bank Arena, Skjern; Attendance: 2,863; Referees: Leandersson, Lindroos (FIN)

8 November 2017; 19:00	Elverum Håndball (Norway)	26–22	(Switzerland) Kadetten Schaffhausen	Terningen Arena, Elverum; Attendance: 2,400; Referees: Kiyashko, Kiselev (RUS)
8 November 2017; 19:00	Lindboe 8	(12–9)	Császár 4	Terningen Arena, Elverum; Attendance: 2,400; Referees: Kiyashko, Kiselev (RUS)
8 November 2017; 19:00	3× (yellow card) 4× (suspension)	Report	3× (yellow card) 6× (suspension)	Terningen Arena, Elverum; Attendance: 2,400; Referees: Kiyashko, Kiselev (RUS)

9 November 2017; 18:00	Dinamo București (Romania)	23–36	(Denmark) Skjern Håndbold	Dinamo Polyvalent Hall, Bucharest; Attendance: 700; Referees: Vesović, Mitrović (MNE)
9 November 2017; 18:00	Descat, Mironescu 5	(8–18)	Christensen 6	Dinamo Polyvalent Hall, Bucharest; Attendance: 700; Referees: Vesović, Mitrović (MNE)
9 November 2017; 18:00	3× (yellow card) 4× (suspension)	Report	3× (yellow card) 4× (suspension) 1× (red card)	Dinamo Polyvalent Hall, Bucharest; Attendance: 700; Referees: Vesović, Mitrović (MNE)

11 November 2017; 19:30	CB Ademar León (Spain)	28–24	(Slovenia) RK Gorenje Velenje	Palacio de los Deportes de León, León; Attendance: 2,000; Referees: Leszczyński, Piechota (POL)
11 November 2017; 19:30	Fernández, Vieyra 5	(15–13)	Cehte, Medved 6	Palacio de los Deportes de León, León; Attendance: 2,000; Referees: Leszczyński, Piechota (POL)
11 November 2017; 19:30	2× (yellow card) 2× (suspension)	Report	1× (yellow card) 4× (suspension)	Palacio de los Deportes de León, León; Attendance: 2,000; Referees: Leszczyński, Piechota (POL)

16 November 2017; 19:00	RK Gorenje Velenje (Slovenia)	33–29	(Romania) Dinamo București	Red Hall, Velenje; Attendance: 1,043; Referees: Gasmi, Gasmi (FRA)
16 November 2017; 19:00	Medved 8	(17–15)	Mocanu 7	Red Hall, Velenje; Attendance: 1,043; Referees: Gasmi, Gasmi (FRA)
16 November 2017; 19:00	3× (yellow card) 2× (suspension)	Report	3× (yellow card) 6× (suspension)	Red Hall, Velenje; Attendance: 1,043; Referees: Gasmi, Gasmi (FRA)

16 November 2017; 20:15	Kadetten Schaffhausen (Switzerland)	23–24	(Spain) CB Ademar León	BBC-Arena, Schaffhausen; Attendance: 1,620; Referees: Bounouara, Sami (FRA)
16 November 2017; 20:15	Marković 8	(10–15)	García 7	BBC-Arena, Schaffhausen; Attendance: 1,620; Referees: Bounouara, Sami (FRA)
16 November 2017; 20:15	3× (yellow card) 5× (suspension) 2× (red card)	Report	3× (yellow card) 4× (suspension)	BBC-Arena, Schaffhausen; Attendance: 1,620; Referees: Bounouara, Sami (FRA)

19 November 2017; 16:50	Skjern Håndbold (Denmark)	35–25	(Norway) Elverum Håndball	Skjern Bank Arena, Skjern; Attendance: 2,617; Referees: Mandák, Rudinský (SVK)
19 November 2017; 16:50	Olsson 7	(16–12)	Poklar 5	Skjern Bank Arena, Skjern; Attendance: 2,617; Referees: Mandák, Rudinský (SVK)
19 November 2017; 16:50	3× (yellow card) 5× (suspension)	Report	2× (yellow card) 4× (suspension)	Skjern Bank Arena, Skjern; Attendance: 2,617; Referees: Mandák, Rudinský (SVK)

25 November 2017; 19:30	RK Gorenje Velenje (Slovenia)	27–21	(Switzerland) Kadetten Schaffhausen	Red Hall, Velenje; Attendance: 1,580; Referees: Erdoğan, Özdeniz (TUR)
25 November 2017; 19:30	Medved, Ovniček 5	(10–11)	Pendic 7	Red Hall, Velenje; Attendance: 1,580; Referees: Erdoğan, Özdeniz (TUR)
25 November 2017; 19:30	2× (yellow card) 5× (suspension)	Report	3× (yellow card) 8× (suspension) 2× (red card)	Red Hall, Velenje; Attendance: 1,580; Referees: Erdoğan, Özdeniz (TUR)

25 November 2017; 19:30	CB Ademar León (Spain)	26–31	(Denmark) Skjern Håndbold	Palacio de los Deportes de León, León; Attendance: 4,000; Referees: Kiyashko, Kiselev (RUS)
25 November 2017; 19:30	three players 5	(12–13)	Myrhol 10	Palacio de los Deportes de León, León; Attendance: 4,000; Referees: Kiyashko, Kiselev (RUS)
25 November 2017; 19:30	1× (yellow card) 1× (suspension)	Report	2× (yellow card) 2× (suspension)	Palacio de los Deportes de León, León; Attendance: 4,000; Referees: Kiyashko, Kiselev (RUS)

26 November 2017; 17:00	Dinamo București (Romania)	33–34	(Norway) Elverum Håndball	Dinamo Polyvalent Hall, Bucharest; Attendance: 800; Referees: Cindrić, Gonzurek (CRO)
26 November 2017; 17:00	Șandru 10	(16–16)	Lindboe 13	Dinamo Polyvalent Hall, Bucharest; Attendance: 800; Referees: Cindrić, Gonzurek (CRO)
26 November 2017; 17:00	3× (yellow card) 4× (suspension)	Report	3× (yellow card)	Dinamo Polyvalent Hall, Bucharest; Attendance: 800; Referees: Cindrić, Gonzurek (CRO)

30 November 2017; 20:15	Kadetten Schaffhausen (Switzerland)	27–25	(Romania) Dinamo București	BBC-Arena, Schaffhausen; Attendance: 1,310; Referees: Pandžić, Mosorinski (SRB)
30 November 2017; 20:15	Tominec 8	(14–14)	Komogorov 9	BBC-Arena, Schaffhausen; Attendance: 1,310; Referees: Pandžić, Mosorinski (SRB)
30 November 2017; 20:15	3× (yellow card) 1× (suspension)	Report	3× (yellow card) 6× (suspension)	BBC-Arena, Schaffhausen; Attendance: 1,310; Referees: Pandžić, Mosorinski (SRB)

3 December 2017; 16:00	Skjern Håndbold (Denmark)	35–20	(Slovenia) RK Gorenje Velenje	Skjern Bank Arena, Skjern; Attendance: 2,411; Referees: Harabagiu, Stănescu (ROU)
3 December 2017; 16:00	Olsson 7	(18–9)	Cehte, Toskić 4	Skjern Bank Arena, Skjern; Attendance: 2,411; Referees: Harabagiu, Stănescu (ROU)
3 December 2017; 16:00	3× (yellow card) 4× (suspension)	Report	3× (yellow card) 3× (suspension)	Skjern Bank Arena, Skjern; Attendance: 2,411; Referees: Harabagiu, Stănescu (ROU)

3 December 2017; 17:00	Elverum Håndball (Norway)	25–30	(Spain) CB Ademar León	Terningen Arena, Elverum; Attendance: 2,280; Referees: Konjičanin, Konjičanin (BIH)
3 December 2017; 17:00	Poklar 5	(13–13)	López 6	Terningen Arena, Elverum; Attendance: 2,280; Referees: Konjičanin, Konjičanin (BIH)
3 December 2017; 17:00	3× (yellow card) 2× (suspension)	Report	2× (yellow card) 3× (suspension)	Terningen Arena, Elverum; Attendance: 2,280; Referees: Konjičanin, Konjičanin (BIH)

=== Group D ===
Pos	Team	Pld	W	D	L	GF	GA	GD	Pts	Qualification
1	(France) Montpellier	10	8	0	2	309	267	+42	16	Playoffs
2	(Ukraine) Motor Zaporizhzhia	10	6	3	1	294	263	+31	15	Playoffs
3	(Turkey) Beşiktaş	10	5	1	4	293	296	−3	11	
4	(Portugal) Sporting CP	10	4	0	6	293	297	−4	8	
5	(North Macedonia) Metalurg Skopje	10	2	1	7	262	293	−31	5 (Note: Metalurg 57–55 Chekhovskiye Medvedi)	
6	(Russia) Chekhovskiye Medvedi	10	2	1	7	271	306	−35	5	

Source: EHF
Rules for classification: See Tiebreakers
Notes:

14 September 2017; 18:15	Motor Zaporizhzhia (Ukraine)	36–23	(Russia) Chekhovskiye Medvedi	Kharkiv Sport Hall, Kharkiv; Attendance: 2,700; Referees: Piechota, Leszczyński (POL)
14 September 2017; 18:15	Malašinskas 7	(21–16)	Kornev, Santalov 4	Kharkiv Sport Hall, Kharkiv; Attendance: 2,700; Referees: Piechota, Leszczyński (POL)
14 September 2017; 18:15	3× (yellow card) 3× (suspension)	Report	3× (yellow card) 3× (suspension) 1× (red card)	Kharkiv Sport Hall, Kharkiv; Attendance: 2,700; Referees: Piechota, Leszczyński (POL)

16 September 2017; 17:30	Montpellier (France)	32–22	(North Macedonia) Metalurg Skopje	Palais des Sports René Bougnol, Montpellier; Attendance: 2,900; Referees: Madsen, Mortensen (DEN)
16 September 2017; 17:30	Guigou 6	(19–11)	Jaganjac 6	Palais des Sports René Bougnol, Montpellier; Attendance: 2,900; Referees: Madsen, Mortensen (DEN)
16 September 2017; 17:30	2× (yellow card) 2× (suspension)	Report	3× (yellow card) 3× (suspension)	Palais des Sports René Bougnol, Montpellier; Attendance: 2,900; Referees: Madsen, Mortensen (DEN)

17 September 2017; 17:00	Beşiktaş (Turkey)	26–30	(Portugal) Sporting CP	Recep Topaloğlu Sports Hall, İzmit; Attendance: 1,000; Referees: Andorka, Hucker (HUN)
17 September 2017; 17:00	Döne 10	(16–17)	Nikčević 6	Recep Topaloğlu Sports Hall, İzmit; Attendance: 1,000; Referees: Andorka, Hucker (HUN)
17 September 2017; 17:00	2× (yellow card) 3× (suspension)	Report	2× (yellow card) 2× (suspension)	Recep Topaloğlu Sports Hall, İzmit; Attendance: 1,000; Referees: Andorka, Hucker (HUN)

23 September 2017; 15:00	Chekhovskiye Medvedi (Russia)	24–28	(France) Montpellier	Olimpiysky Sport Palace, Chekhov; Attendance: 900; Referees: Baumgart, Wild (GER)
23 September 2017; 15:00	Santalov 5	(13–14)	Porte 8	Olimpiysky Sport Palace, Chekhov; Attendance: 900; Referees: Baumgart, Wild (GER)
23 September 2017; 15:00	3× (yellow card) 3× (suspension)	Report	3× (yellow card) 2× (suspension)	Olimpiysky Sport Palace, Chekhov; Attendance: 900; Referees: Baumgart, Wild (GER)

24 September 2017; 17:00	Metalurg (North Macedonia)	27–31	(Turkey) Beşiktaş	Boris Trajkovski Sports Center, Skopje; Attendance: 2,000; Referees: Nabokau, Kulik (BLR)
24 September 2017; 17:00	Jaganjac 9	(14–14)	Döne, Nuić 7	Boris Trajkovski Sports Center, Skopje; Attendance: 2,000; Referees: Nabokau, Kulik (BLR)
24 September 2017; 17:00	2× (yellow card) 1× (suspension)	Report	4× (yellow card) 2× (suspension)	Boris Trajkovski Sports Center, Skopje; Attendance: 2,000; Referees: Nabokau, Kulik (BLR)

24 September 2017; 19:00	Sporting CP (Portugal)	23–31	(Ukraine) Motor Zaporizhzhia	Pavilhão João Rocha, Lisbon; Attendance: 1,410; Referees: Harabagiu, Stănescu (ROU)
24 September 2017; 19:00	Araújo 6	(11–15)	Kozakevych 7	Pavilhão João Rocha, Lisbon; Attendance: 1,410; Referees: Harabagiu, Stănescu (ROU)
24 September 2017; 19:00	2× (yellow card) 5× (suspension) 1× (red card)	Report	3× (yellow card) 6× (suspension)	Pavilhão João Rocha, Lisbon; Attendance: 1,410; Referees: Harabagiu, Stănescu (ROU)

30 September 2017; 15:00	Chekhovskiye Medvedi (Russia)	27–29	(Turkey) Beşiktaş	Olimpiysky Sport Palace, Chekhov; Attendance: 1,220; Referees: Leandersson, Lindroos (FIN)
30 September 2017; 15:00	Santalov 6	(17–13)	Döne, Vražalić 6	Olimpiysky Sport Palace, Chekhov; Attendance: 1,220; Referees: Leandersson, Lindroos (FIN)
30 September 2017; 15:00	4× (yellow card) 4× (suspension) 1× (red card)	Report	3× (yellow card) 4× (suspension)	Olimpiysky Sport Palace, Chekhov; Attendance: 1,220; Referees: Leandersson, Lindroos (FIN)

30 September 2017; 17:30	Metalurg (North Macedonia)	28–27	(Portugal) Sporting CP	Boris Trajkovski Sports Center, Skopje; Attendance: 2,820; Referees: Covalciuc, Covalciuc (MDA)
30 September 2017; 17:30	Kuzmanovski 6	(17–13)	Carneiro 6	Boris Trajkovski Sports Center, Skopje; Attendance: 2,820; Referees: Covalciuc, Covalciuc (MDA)
30 September 2017; 17:30	4× (yellow card) 2× (suspension)	Report	2× (yellow card) 6× (suspension)	Boris Trajkovski Sports Center, Skopje; Attendance: 2,820; Referees: Covalciuc, Covalciuc (MDA)

1 October 2017; 17:00	Montpellier (France)	28–20	(Ukraine) Motor Zaporizhzhia	Palais des Sports René Bougnol, Montpellier; Attendance: 3,000; Referees: Horváth, Marton (HUN)
1 October 2017; 17:00	Porte 6	(18–13)	Paczkowski 6	Palais des Sports René Bougnol, Montpellier; Attendance: 3,000; Referees: Horváth, Marton (HUN)
1 October 2017; 17:00	2× (yellow card) 3× (suspension)	Report	2× (yellow card) 3× (suspension)	Palais des Sports René Bougnol, Montpellier; Attendance: 3,000; Referees: Horváth, Marton (HUN)

4 October 2017; 20:00	Sporting CP (Portugal)	31–30	(Russia) Chekhovskiye Medvedi	Pavilhão João Rocha, Lisbon; Attendance: 600; Referees: Lah, Sok (SLO)
4 October 2017; 20:00	Carol 7	(20–17)	Ostashchenko 7	Pavilhão João Rocha, Lisbon; Attendance: 600; Referees: Lah, Sok (SLO)
4 October 2017; 20:00	2× (yellow card) 5× (suspension)	Report	2× (yellow card) 1× (suspension)	Pavilhão João Rocha, Lisbon; Attendance: 600; Referees: Lah, Sok (SLO)

8 October 2017; 16:00	Beşiktaş (Turkey)	32–36	(France) Montpellier	Recep Topaloğlu Sports Hall, İzmit; Attendance: 1,100; Referees: Leszczynski, Piechota (POL)
8 October 2017; 16:00	Döne 10	(16–20)	Kavtičnik 7	Recep Topaloğlu Sports Hall, İzmit; Attendance: 1,100; Referees: Leszczynski, Piechota (POL)
8 October 2017; 16:00	3× (yellow card) 4× (suspension)	Report	2× (yellow card) 4× (suspension)	Recep Topaloğlu Sports Hall, İzmit; Attendance: 1,100; Referees: Leszczynski, Piechota (POL)

8 October 2017; 16:00	Motor Zaporizhzhia (Ukraine)	28–28	(North Macedonia) Metalurg	Kharkiv Sport Hall, Kharkiv; Attendance: 2,400; Referees: Bounouara, Sami (FRA)
8 October 2017; 16:00	Denysov 8	(12–18)	Gugleta, Jaganjac 7	Kharkiv Sport Hall, Kharkiv; Attendance: 2,400; Referees: Bounouara, Sami (FRA)
8 October 2017; 16:00	3× (yellow card) 3× (suspension)	Report	2× (yellow card) 2× (suspension)	Kharkiv Sport Hall, Kharkiv; Attendance: 2,400; Referees: Bounouara, Sami (FRA)

14 October 2017; 15:00	Beşiktaş (Turkey)	28–28	(Ukraine) Motor Zaporizhzhia	Recep Topaloğlu Sports Hall, İzmit; Attendance: 940; Referees: Pandžić, Mosorinski (SRB)
14 October 2017; 15:00	Pribak 12	(14–17)	Soroka 7	Recep Topaloğlu Sports Hall, İzmit; Attendance: 940; Referees: Pandžić, Mosorinski (SRB)
14 October 2017; 15:00	2× (yellow card) 5× (suspension)	Report	3× (yellow card) 3× (suspension)	Recep Topaloğlu Sports Hall, İzmit; Attendance: 940; Referees: Pandžić, Mosorinski (SRB)

14 October 2017; 15:00	Chekhovskiye Medvedi (Russia)	26–32	(North Macedonia) Metalurg	Olimpiysky Sport Palace, Chekhov; Attendance: 1,400; Referees: Jørum, Kleven (NOR)
14 October 2017; 15:00	Santalov 6	(15–15)	Jaganjac 9	Olimpiysky Sport Palace, Chekhov; Attendance: 1,400; Referees: Jørum, Kleven (NOR)
14 October 2017; 15:00	1× (yellow card) 3× (suspension)	Report	2× (yellow card) 4× (suspension)	Olimpiysky Sport Palace, Chekhov; Attendance: 1,400; Referees: Jørum, Kleven (NOR)

15 October 2017; 19:00	Sporting CP (Portugal)	29–33	(France) Montpellier	Pavilhão João Rocha, Lisbon; Attendance: 1,502; Referees: Konjičanin, Konjičanin (BIH)
15 October 2017; 19:00	Araújo 6	(11–19)	Richardson, Truchanovičius 6	Pavilhão João Rocha, Lisbon; Attendance: 1,502; Referees: Konjičanin, Konjičanin (BIH)
15 October 2017; 19:00	3× (yellow card) 5× (suspension)	Report	3× (yellow card) 5× (suspension)	Pavilhão João Rocha, Lisbon; Attendance: 1,502; Referees: Konjičanin, Konjičanin (BIH)

4 November 2017; 17:00	Motor Zaporizhzhia (Ukraine)	28–22	(Turkey) Beşiktaş	Kharkiv Sport Hall, Kharkiv; Attendance: 2,300; Referees: Cindrić, Gonzurek (CRO)
4 November 2017; 17:00	Pukhouski 8	(12–11)	Vražalić 8	Kharkiv Sport Hall, Kharkiv; Attendance: 2,300; Referees: Cindrić, Gonzurek (CRO)
4 November 2017; 17:00	3× (yellow card) 4× (suspension)	Report	3× (yellow card) 3× (suspension)	Kharkiv Sport Hall, Kharkiv; Attendance: 2,300; Referees: Cindrić, Gonzurek (CRO)

4 November 2017; 17:30	Montpellier (France)	33–32	(Portugal) Sporting CP	Park&Suites Arena, Montpellier; Attendance: 3,000; Referees: Brunner, Salah (SUI)
4 November 2017; 17:30	Afgour, Simonet 6	(16–17)	Nikčević 11	Park&Suites Arena, Montpellier; Attendance: 3,000; Referees: Brunner, Salah (SUI)
4 November 2017; 17:30	2× (yellow card) 4× (suspension)	Report	1× (yellow card) 7× (suspension)	Park&Suites Arena, Montpellier; Attendance: 3,000; Referees: Brunner, Salah (SUI)

5 November 2017; 17:00	Metalurg (North Macedonia)	25–29	(Russia) Chekhovskiye Medvedi	Boris Trajkovski Sports Center, Skopje; Attendance: 2,500; Referees: Hermann, Madsen (DEN)
5 November 2017; 17:00	Anđelić 5	(12–17)	Santalov 7	Boris Trajkovski Sports Center, Skopje; Attendance: 2,500; Referees: Hermann, Madsen (DEN)
5 November 2017; 17:00	3× (yellow card) 2× (suspension)	Report	2× (yellow card) 5× (suspension)	Boris Trajkovski Sports Center, Skopje; Attendance: 2,500; Referees: Hermann, Madsen (DEN)

11 November 2017; 14:00	Chekhovskiye Medvedi (Russia)	30–30	(Ukraine) Motor Zaporizhzhia	Olimpiysky Sport Palace, Chekhov; Attendance: 1,300; Referees: Panayides, Andreou (CYP)
11 November 2017; 14:00	Santalov 10	(15–17)	Malasinskas 7	Olimpiysky Sport Palace, Chekhov; Attendance: 1,300; Referees: Panayides, Andreou (CYP)
11 November 2017; 14:00	3× (yellow card) 3× (suspension)	Report	3× (yellow card) 3× (suspension)	Olimpiysky Sport Palace, Chekhov; Attendance: 1,300; Referees: Panayides, Andreou (CYP)

11 November 2017; 19:00	Sporting CP (Portugal)	34–27	(Turkey) Beşiktaş	Pavilhão João Rocha, Lisbon; Attendance: 1,114; Referees: Baumgart, Wild (GER)
11 November 2017; 19:00	Carol, Nikčević 6	(17–12)	Döne 7	Pavilhão João Rocha, Lisbon; Attendance: 1,114; Referees: Baumgart, Wild (GER)
11 November 2017; 19:00	2× (yellow card) 3× (suspension)	Report	3× (yellow card) 5× (suspension)	Pavilhão João Rocha, Lisbon; Attendance: 1,114; Referees: Baumgart, Wild (GER)

12 November 2017; 19:00	Metalurg (North Macedonia)	21–27	(France) Montpellier	Boris Trajkovski Sports Center, Skopje; Attendance: 2,500; Referees: Álvarez, Bustamante (ESP)
12 November 2017; 19:00	three players 5	(14–16)	Caussé, Porte 6	Boris Trajkovski Sports Center, Skopje; Attendance: 2,500; Referees: Álvarez, Bustamante (ESP)
12 November 2017; 19:00	3× (yellow card) 3× (suspension)	Report	2× (yellow card) 3× (suspension)	Boris Trajkovski Sports Center, Skopje; Attendance: 2,500; Referees: Álvarez, Bustamante (ESP)

18 November 2017; 15:00	Beşiktaş (Turkey)	32–29	(North Macedonia) Metalurg	Recep Topaloğlu Sports Hall, İzmit; Attendance: 1,500; Referees: Brkic, Jusufhodzic (AUT)
18 November 2017; 15:00	Özbahar, Vražalić 7	(13–15)	Kuzmanovski 6	Recep Topaloğlu Sports Hall, İzmit; Attendance: 1,500; Referees: Brkic, Jusufhodzic (AUT)
18 November 2017; 15:00	3× (yellow card) 5× (suspension)	Report	3× (yellow card) 4× (suspension)	Recep Topaloğlu Sports Hall, İzmit; Attendance: 1,500; Referees: Brkic, Jusufhodzic (AUT)

18 November 2017; 17:00	Motor Zaporizhzhia (Ukraine)	32–29	(Portugal) Sporting CP	Kharkiv Sport Hall, Kharkiv; Attendance: 2,400; Referees: Gousko, Repkin (BLR)
18 November 2017; 17:00	Malasinskas 8	(14–15)	Carol 7	Kharkiv Sport Hall, Kharkiv; Attendance: 2,400; Referees: Gousko, Repkin (BLR)
18 November 2017; 17:00	1× (yellow card) 3× (suspension) 2× (red card)	Report	2× (yellow card) 4× (suspension) 2× (red card)	Kharkiv Sport Hall, Kharkiv; Attendance: 2,400; Referees: Gousko, Repkin (BLR)

19 November 2017; 19:00	Montpellier (France)	34–23	(Russia) Chekhovskiye Medvedi	Park&Suites Arena, Montpellier; Attendance: 2,850; Referees: Katsikis, Michailidis (GRE)
19 November 2017; 19:00	Causse 6	(15–11)	Santalov 5	Park&Suites Arena, Montpellier; Attendance: 2,850; Referees: Katsikis, Michailidis (GRE)
19 November 2017; 19:00	1× (yellow card) 5× (suspension)	Report	4× (yellow card) 4× (suspension)	Park&Suites Arena, Montpellier; Attendance: 2,850; Referees: Katsikis, Michailidis (GRE)

25 November 2017; 14:00	Chekhovskiye Medvedi (Russia)	30–27	(Portugal) Sporting CP	Olimpiysky Sport Palace, Chekhov; Attendance: 1,000; Referees: Covalciuc, Covalciuc (MDA)
25 November 2017; 14:00	Kuretkov 8	(16–13)	Rocha 9	Olimpiysky Sport Palace, Chekhov; Attendance: 1,000; Referees: Covalciuc, Covalciuc (MDA)
25 November 2017; 14:00	2× (yellow card) 1× (suspension) 2× (red card)	Report	3× (yellow card) 3× (suspension)	Olimpiysky Sport Palace, Chekhov; Attendance: 1,000; Referees: Covalciuc, Covalciuc (MDA)

25 November 2017; 17:30	Metalurg (North Macedonia)	22–30	(Ukraine) Motor Zaporizhzhia	Boris Trajkovski Sports Center, Skopje; Attendance: 2,000; Referees: Opava, Válek (CZE)
25 November 2017; 17:30	Dimitrievski 5	(11–16)	Kozakevych 5	Boris Trajkovski Sports Center, Skopje; Attendance: 2,000; Referees: Opava, Válek (CZE)
25 November 2017; 17:30	2× (yellow card) 2× (suspension)	Report	4× (yellow card) 5× (suspension)	Boris Trajkovski Sports Center, Skopje; Attendance: 2,000; Referees: Opava, Válek (CZE)

26 November 2017; 17:00	Montpellier (France)	28–33	(Turkey) Beşiktaş	Park&Suites Arena, Montpellier; Attendance: 2,800; Referees: Südi, Herczeg (HUN)
26 November 2017; 17:00	Truchanovicius 6	(14–19)	four players 6	Park&Suites Arena, Montpellier; Attendance: 2,800; Referees: Südi, Herczeg (HUN)
26 November 2017; 17:00	3× (yellow card) 3× (suspension)	Report	3× (yellow card) 2× (suspension)	Park&Suites Arena, Montpellier; Attendance: 2,800; Referees: Südi, Herczeg (HUN)

2 December 2017; 21:00	Sporting CP (Portugal)	31–27	(North Macedonia) Metalurg	Pavilhão João Rocha, Lisbon; Attendance: 415; Referees: Bonifert, Oláh (HUN)
2 December 2017; 21:00	Carol, Ruesga 7	(12–15)	Ilić 6	Pavilhão João Rocha, Lisbon; Attendance: 415; Referees: Bonifert, Oláh (HUN)
2 December 2017; 21:00	3× (yellow card) 5× (suspension)	Report	2× (yellow card) 7× (suspension) 1× (red card)	Pavilhão João Rocha, Lisbon; Attendance: 415; Referees: Bonifert, Oláh (HUN)

3 December 2017; 14:00	Beşiktaş (Turkey)	33–29	(Russia) Chekhovskiye Medvedi	Recep Topaloğlu Sports Hall, İzmit; Attendance: 1,000; Referees: Vesović, Mitrović (MNE)
3 December 2017; 14:00	Tomić 9	(16–12)	Santalov 6	Recep Topaloğlu Sports Hall, İzmit; Attendance: 1,000; Referees: Vesović, Mitrović (MNE)
3 December 2017; 14:00	3× (yellow card) 4× (suspension)	Report	3× (yellow card) 2× (suspension)	Recep Topaloğlu Sports Hall, İzmit; Attendance: 1,000; Referees: Vesović, Mitrović (MNE)

3 December 2017; 15:00	Motor Zaporizhzhia (Ukraine)	31–30	(France) Montpellier	Kharkiv Sport Hall, Kharkiv; Attendance: 2,400; Referees: Boričić, Marković (SRB)
3 December 2017; 15:00	Pukhouski 8	(14–12)	Kavtičnik 6	Kharkiv Sport Hall, Kharkiv; Attendance: 2,400; Referees: Boričić, Marković (SRB)
3 December 2017; 15:00	3× (yellow card) 5× (suspension)	Report	3× (yellow card) 2× (suspension)	Kharkiv Sport Hall, Kharkiv; Attendance: 2,400; Referees: Boričić, Marković (SRB)

== Playoffs ==
The top two teams from Groups C and D contested a playoff to determine the two sides advancing to the knockout phase. The winners of each group faced the runners-up of the other group in a two-legged tie. The first leg was played on 24 February 2018 and the second leg on 4 March 2018.

Team 1	Agg.	Team 2	1st leg	2nd leg
CB Ademar León (Spain)	43–48	(France) Montpellier	24–28	19–20
Motor Zaporizhzhia (Ukraine)	58–63	(Denmark) Skjern Håndbold	32–30	26–33

=== Matches ===
24 February 2018; 19:30	CB Ademar León (Spain)	24–28	(France) Montpellier	Palacio de los Deportes de León, León; Attendance: 4,000; Referees: Schulze, Tönnies (GER)
24 February 2018; 19:30	Costoya 5	(12–14)	Richardson 8	Palacio de los Deportes de León, León; Attendance: 4,000; Referees: Schulze, Tönnies (GER)
24 February 2018; 19:30	4× (yellow card) 1× (suspension)	Report	2× (yellow card) 4× (suspension)	Palacio de los Deportes de León, León; Attendance: 4,000; Referees: Schulze, Tönnies (GER)

4 March 2018; 17:00	Montpellier (France)	20–19	(Spain) CB Ademar León	Palais des Sports René Bougnol, Montpellier; Attendance: 3,000; Referees: Vešović, Mitrović (MNE)
4 March 2018; 17:00	Kavtičnik 6	(13–8)	Diego, Filho 5	Palais des Sports René Bougnol, Montpellier; Attendance: 3,000; Referees: Vešović, Mitrović (MNE)
4 March 2018; 17:00	3× (yellow card) 4× (suspension)	Report	3× (yellow card) 3× (suspension)	Palais des Sports René Bougnol, Montpellier; Attendance: 3,000; Referees: Vešović, Mitrović (MNE)

24 February 2018; 17:00	Motor Zaporizhzhia (Ukraine)	32–30	(Denmark) Skjern Håndbold	Kharkiv Sport Hall, Kharkiv; Attendance: 2,700; Referees: Jurinović, Mrvica (CRO)
24 February 2018; 17:00	Kozakevych 8	(19–14)	Olsson 9	Kharkiv Sport Hall, Kharkiv; Attendance: 2,700; Referees: Jurinović, Mrvica (CRO)
24 February 2018; 17:00	3× (yellow card)	Report	3× (yellow card) 1× (suspension)	Kharkiv Sport Hall, Kharkiv; Attendance: 2,700; Referees: Jurinović, Mrvica (CRO)

4 March 2018; 15:10	Skjern Håndbold (Denmark)	33–26	(Ukraine) Motor Zaporizhzhia	Skjern Bank Arena, Skjern; Attendance: 2,781; Referees: Baranowski, Lemanowicz (POL)
4 March 2018; 15:10	Myrhol 7	(20–15)	Denysov 7	Skjern Bank Arena, Skjern; Attendance: 2,781; Referees: Baranowski, Lemanowicz (POL)
4 March 2018; 15:10	3× (yellow card) 2× (suspension)	Report	3× (yellow card) 5× (suspension)	Skjern Bank Arena, Skjern; Attendance: 2,781; Referees: Baranowski, Lemanowicz (POL)
