= 2017–18 EHF Champions League knockout stage =

This article describes the knockout stage of the 2017–18 EHF Champions League.

== Qualified teams ==
The top six placed teams from each of the two groups advanced to the knockout stage.

Group	Qualified for quarterfinals	Qualified for Round of 16				
Group	First place	Second place	Third place	Fourth place	Fifth place	Sixth place
A	(North Macedonia) Vardar	(Spain) Barcelona Lassa	(France) HBC Nantes	(Germany) Rhein-Neckar Löwen	(Hungary) MOL-Pick Szeged	(Sweden) IFK Kristianstad
B	(France) Paris Saint-Germain	(Hungary) Telekom Veszprém	(Germany) Flensburg-Handewitt	(Germany) THW Kiel	(Poland) PGE Vive Kielce	(Belarus) Meshkov Brest
Playoff winners	(Denmark) Skjern Håndbold (France) Montpellier					

== Format ==
12 teams played home and away in the first knock-out phase, with the 10 teams qualified from groups A and B and the two teams qualified from groups C and D. After that, the six winners of these matches in the first knock-out phase joined the winners of groups A and B to play home and away for the right to play in the final four.

== Round of 16 ==
=== Overview ===
Team 1	Agg.	Team 2	1st leg	2nd leg
Montpellier (France)	56–55	(Spain) Barcelona Lassa	28–25	28–30
Skjern Håndbold (Denmark)	61–59	(Hungary) Telekom Veszprém	32–25	29–34
Meshkov Brest (Belarus)	52–60	(France) HBC Nantes	24–32	28–28
IFK Kristianstad (Sweden)	46–53	(Germany) Flensburg-Handewitt	22–26	24–27
PGE Vive Kielce (Poland)	77–47	(Germany) Rhein-Neckar Löwen	41–17	36–30
THW Kiel (Germany)	56–50	(Hungary) MOL-Pick Szeged	29–22	27–28

Notes

1. Order of legs reversed after original draw.
2. A scheduling conflict for the first leg resulted in the Rhein-Neckar Löwen only fielding their reserve team against Kielce while the first team played a Handball-Bundesliga match against THW Kiel on the same day.

=== Matches ===
25 March 2018; 17:00	Montpellier (France)	28–25	(Spain) Barcelona Lassa	Palais des Sports René Bougnol, Montpellier; Attendance: 3,200; Referees: Nikolov, Nachevski (MKD)
25 March 2018; 17:00	Truchanovicius 8	(13–13)	N'Guessan 7	Palais des Sports René Bougnol, Montpellier; Attendance: 3,200; Referees: Nikolov, Nachevski (MKD)
25 March 2018; 17:00	3× (yellow card) 2× (suspension)	Report	3× (yellow card) 3× (suspension)	Palais des Sports René Bougnol, Montpellier; Attendance: 3,200; Referees: Nikolov, Nachevski (MKD)

31 March 2018; 18:30	Barcelona Lassa (Spain)	30–28	(France) Montpellier	Palau Blaugrana, Barcelona; Attendance: 5,114; Referees: Geipel, Helbig (GER)
31 March 2018; 18:30	3 players 5	(15–14)	Richardson 7	Palau Blaugrana, Barcelona; Attendance: 5,114; Referees: Geipel, Helbig (GER)
31 March 2018; 18:30	3× (yellow card) 2× (suspension)	Report	3× (yellow card) 4× (suspension)	Palau Blaugrana, Barcelona; Attendance: 5,114; Referees: Geipel, Helbig (GER)

Montpellier won 56–55 on aggregate.

25 March 2018; 16:50	Skjern Håndbold (Denmark)	32–25	(Hungary) Telekom Veszprém	Skjern Bank Arena, Skjern; Attendance: 3,200; Referees: Gousko, Repkin (BLR)
25 March 2018; 16:50	Olsson, Rasmussen 6	(17–13)	Marguč 6	Skjern Bank Arena, Skjern; Attendance: 3,200; Referees: Gousko, Repkin (BLR)
25 March 2018; 16:50	3× (yellow card) 1× (suspension)	Report	3× (yellow card) 1× (suspension)	Skjern Bank Arena, Skjern; Attendance: 3,200; Referees: Gousko, Repkin (BLR)

31 March 2018; 17:30	Telekom Veszprém (Hungary)	34–29	(Denmark) Skjern Håndbold	Veszprém Aréna, Veszprém; Attendance: 5,080; Referees: Pichon, Reveret (FRA)
31 March 2018; 17:30	Nenadić 9	(16–13)	Eggert 7	Veszprém Aréna, Veszprém; Attendance: 5,080; Referees: Pichon, Reveret (FRA)
31 March 2018; 17:30	3× (yellow card) 9× (suspension)	Report	3× (yellow card) 4× (suspension)	Veszprém Aréna, Veszprém; Attendance: 5,080; Referees: Pichon, Reveret (FRA)

Skjern Håndbold won 61–59 on aggregate.

24 March 2018; 17:30	Meshkov Brest (Belarus)	24–32	(France) HBC Nantes	Universal Sports Complex Victoria, Brest; Attendance: 3,740; Referees: Erdoğan, Özdeniz (TUR)
24 March 2018; 17:30	Razgor 5	(14–16)	Hansen, Klein 6	Universal Sports Complex Victoria, Brest; Attendance: 3,740; Referees: Erdoğan, Özdeniz (TUR)
24 March 2018; 17:30	1× (yellow card) 3× (suspension)	Report	3× (yellow card) 2× (suspension)	Universal Sports Complex Victoria, Brest; Attendance: 3,740; Referees: Erdoğan, Özdeniz (TUR)

1 April 2018; 17:00	HBC Nantes (France)	28–28	(Belarus) Meshkov Brest	La Trocardière, Rezé; Attendance: 4,438; Referees: Lah, Sok (SLO)
1 April 2018; 17:00	Tournat 6	(14–17)	Shumak 7	La Trocardière, Rezé; Attendance: 4,438; Referees: Lah, Sok (SLO)
1 April 2018; 17:00	3× (yellow card) 1× (suspension)	Report	2× (yellow card) 3× (suspension)	La Trocardière, Rezé; Attendance: 4,438; Referees: Lah, Sok (SLO)

HBC Nantes won 60–52 on aggregate.

24 March 2018; 18:00	IFK Kristianstad (Sweden)	22–26	(Germany) Flensburg-Handewitt	Kristianstad Arena, Kristianstad; Attendance: 5,178; Referees: Marín, García (ESP)
24 March 2018; 18:00	Lagergren 6	(12–11)	Wanne 8	Kristianstad Arena, Kristianstad; Attendance: 5,178; Referees: Marín, García (ESP)
24 March 2018; 18:00	2× (yellow card) 5× (suspension)	Report	2× (yellow card) 6× (suspension)	Kristianstad Arena, Kristianstad; Attendance: 5,178; Referees: Marín, García (ESP)

28 March 2018; 19:00	Flensburg-Handewitt (Germany)	27–24	(Sweden) IFK Kristianstad	Flens-Arena, Flensburg; Attendance: 5,221; Referees: Herczeg, Südi (HUN)
28 March 2018; 19:00	Svan 5	(13–9)	Lipovac 7	Flens-Arena, Flensburg; Attendance: 5,221; Referees: Herczeg, Südi (HUN)
28 March 2018; 19:00	3× (yellow card) 1× (suspension)	Report	3× (yellow card) 2× (suspension)	Flens-Arena, Flensburg; Attendance: 5,221; Referees: Herczeg, Südi (HUN)

Flensburg-Handewitt won 53–46 on aggregate.

24 March 2018; 16:00	PGE Vive Kielce (Poland)	41–17	(Germany) Rhein-Neckar Löwen	Hala Legionów, Kielce; Attendance: 4,100; Referees: Baďura, Ondogrecula (SVK)
24 March 2018; 16:00	Jurecki, Štrlek 7	(21–8)	Keller 5	Hala Legionów, Kielce; Attendance: 4,100; Referees: Baďura, Ondogrecula (SVK)
24 March 2018; 16:00	1× (yellow card) 3× (suspension)	Report	2× (yellow card) 6× (suspension)	Hala Legionów, Kielce; Attendance: 4,100; Referees: Baďura, Ondogrecula (SVK)

1 April 2018; 19:00	Rhein-Neckar Löwen (Germany)	30–36	(Poland) PGE Vive Kielce	SAP Arena, Mannheim; Attendance: 4,425; Referees: Elíasson, Pálsson (ISL)
1 April 2018; 19:00	Schmid 8	(18–16)	Dujshebaev, Jurecki 5	SAP Arena, Mannheim; Attendance: 4,425; Referees: Elíasson, Pálsson (ISL)
1 April 2018; 19:00	3× (yellow card) 3× (suspension)	Report	4× (yellow card) 4× (suspension)	SAP Arena, Mannheim; Attendance: 4,425; Referees: Elíasson, Pálsson (ISL)

PGE Vive Kielce won 77–47 on aggregate.

21 March 2018; 19:00	THW Kiel (Germany)	29–22	(Hungary) MOL-Pick Szeged	Sparkassen-Arena, Kiel; Attendance: 8,500; Referees: Nikolić, Stojković (SRB)
21 March 2018; 19:00	Vujin 8	(14–14)	Bánhidi 5	Sparkassen-Arena, Kiel; Attendance: 8,500; Referees: Nikolić, Stojković (SRB)
21 March 2018; 19:00	4× (yellow card) 4× (suspension)	Report	3× (yellow card) 3× (suspension)	Sparkassen-Arena, Kiel; Attendance: 8,500; Referees: Nikolić, Stojković (SRB)

1 April 2018; 17:00	MOL-Pick Szeged (Hungary)	28–27	(Germany) THW Kiel	Városi Sportcsarnok, Szeged; Attendance: 3,200; Referees: Gjeding, Hansen (DEN)
1 April 2018; 17:00	Källman 6	(12–13)	Wiencek 9	Városi Sportcsarnok, Szeged; Attendance: 3,200; Referees: Gjeding, Hansen (DEN)
1 April 2018; 17:00	1× (yellow card) 5× (suspension)	Report	3× (yellow card) 5× (suspension)	Városi Sportcsarnok, Szeged; Attendance: 3,200; Referees: Gjeding, Hansen (DEN)

THW Kiel won 56–50 on aggregate.

== Quarterfinals ==
=== Overview ===
Team 1	Agg.	Team 2	1st leg	2nd leg
THW Kiel (Germany)	56–56	(North Macedonia) Vardar	28–29	28–27
PGE Vive Kielce (Poland)	60–69	(France) Paris Saint-Germain	28–34	32–35
Flensburg-Handewitt (Germany)	45–57	(France) Montpellier	28–28	17–29
HBC Nantes (France)	60–54	(Denmark) Skjern Håndbold	33–27	27–27

=== Matches ===
22 April 2018; 17:00	THW Kiel (Germany)	28–29	(North Macedonia) Vardar	Sparkassen-Arena, Kiel; Attendance: 9,500; Referees: Pichon, Reveret (FRA)
22 April 2018; 17:00	three players 4	(12–14)	three players 5	Sparkassen-Arena, Kiel; Attendance: 9,500; Referees: Pichon, Reveret (FRA)
22 April 2018; 17:00	3× (yellow card) 4× (suspension)	Report	1× (yellow card) 3× (suspension)	Sparkassen-Arena, Kiel; Attendance: 9,500; Referees: Pichon, Reveret (FRA)

29 April 2018; 17:00	Vardar (North Macedonia)	27–28	(Germany) THW Kiel	Jane Sandanski Arena, Skopje; Attendance: 5,500; Referees: Horáček, Novotný (CZE)
29 April 2018; 17:00	Borozan 6	(13–13)	three players 5	Jane Sandanski Arena, Skopje; Attendance: 5,500; Referees: Horáček, Novotný (CZE)
29 April 2018; 17:00	3× (yellow card) 4× (suspension)	Report	3× (yellow card) 5× (suspension)	Jane Sandanski Arena, Skopje; Attendance: 5,500; Referees: Horáček, Novotný (CZE)

Vardar won 56–56 on aggregate on away goals.

21 April 2018; 18:30	PGE Vive Kielce (Poland)	28–34	(France) Paris Saint-Germain	Hala Legionów, Kielce; Attendance: 4,200; Referees: Pavićević, Ražnatović (MNE)
21 April 2018; 18:30	Dujshebaev 7	(10–22)	three players 5	Hala Legionów, Kielce; Attendance: 4,200; Referees: Pavićević, Ražnatović (MNE)
21 April 2018; 18:30	3× (yellow card) 4× (suspension) 1× (red card)	Report	2× (yellow card) 4× (suspension)	Hala Legionów, Kielce; Attendance: 4,200; Referees: Pavićević, Ražnatović (MNE)

28 April 2018; 17:30	Paris Saint-Germain (France)	35–32	(Poland) PGE Vive Kielce	Halle Georges Carpentier, Paris; Attendance: 3,500; Referees: Nikolov, Nachevski (MKD)
28 April 2018; 17:30	Remili 9	(17–15)	Bielecki, Dujshebaev 5	Halle Georges Carpentier, Paris; Attendance: 3,500; Referees: Nikolov, Nachevski (MKD)
28 April 2018; 17:30	4× (yellow card) 7× (suspension)	Report	4× (yellow card) 7× (suspension)	Halle Georges Carpentier, Paris; Attendance: 3,500; Referees: Nikolov, Nachevski (MKD)

Paris Saint-Germain won 69–60 on aggregate.

18 April 2018; 19:00	Flensburg-Handewitt (Germany)	28–28	(France) Montpellier	Flens-Arena, Flensburg; Attendance: 4,503; Referees: Gubica, Milošević (CRO)
18 April 2018; 19:00	three players 5	(17–15)	Fabregas 7	Flens-Arena, Flensburg; Attendance: 4,503; Referees: Gubica, Milošević (CRO)
18 April 2018; 19:00	3× (yellow card) 1× (suspension)	Report	1× (yellow card) 5× (suspension)	Flens-Arena, Flensburg; Attendance: 4,503; Referees: Gubica, Milošević (CRO)

29 April 2018; 19:00	Montpellier (France)	29–17	(Germany) Flensburg-Handewitt	Sud de France Arena, Montpellier; Attendance: 7,500; Referees: Sondors, Līcis (LAT)
29 April 2018; 19:00	Richardson 9	(14–9)	Svan 5	Sud de France Arena, Montpellier; Attendance: 7,500; Referees: Sondors, Līcis (LAT)
29 April 2018; 19:00	3× (yellow card) 2× (suspension)	Report	2× (yellow card) 5× (suspension)	Sud de France Arena, Montpellier; Attendance: 7,500; Referees: Sondors, Līcis (LAT)

Montpellier won 57–45 on aggregate.

22 April 2018; 19:00	HBC Nantes (France)	33–27	(Denmark) Skjern Håndbold	Salle Sportive de la Trocardiere, Rezé; Attendance: 4,600; Referees: Brunner, Salah (SUI)
22 April 2018; 19:00	Balaguer 8	(18–12)	Olsson 6	Salle Sportive de la Trocardiere, Rezé; Attendance: 4,600; Referees: Brunner, Salah (SUI)
22 April 2018; 19:00	3× (yellow card) 3× (suspension)	Report	2× (yellow card) 3× (suspension)	Salle Sportive de la Trocardiere, Rezé; Attendance: 4,600; Referees: Brunner, Salah (SUI)

29 April 2018; 16:50	Skjern Håndbold (Denmark)	27–27	(France) HBC Nantes	Skjern Bank Arena, Skjern; Attendance: 3,264; Referees: Geipel, Helbig (GER)
29 April 2018; 16:50	Søndergaard 8	(12–15)	Gurbindo 6	Skjern Bank Arena, Skjern; Attendance: 3,264; Referees: Geipel, Helbig (GER)
29 April 2018; 16:50	2× (yellow card) 4× (suspension)	Report	4× (yellow card) 4× (suspension)	Skjern Bank Arena, Skjern; Attendance: 3,264; Referees: Geipel, Helbig (GER)

HBC Nantes won 60–54 on aggregate.

== Final four ==
The final four was held at the Lanxess Arena in Cologne, Germany on 26 and 27 May 2018. The draw was held on 2 May 2018.

=== Bracket ===
Semifinals
26 May
(France) HBC Nantes	32
(France) Paris Saint-Germain	28
26 May
(North Macedonia) Vardar	27
(France) Montpellier	28

Final
27 May
(France) HBC Nantes	27
(France) Montpellier	32
Third place
27 May
(France) Paris Saint-Germain	29
(North Macedonia) Vardar	28

=== Semifinals ===
26 May 2018; 15:15	HBC Nantes (France)	32−28	(France) Paris Saint-Germain	Lanxess Arena, Cologne; Attendance: 19,250; Referees: Gjeding, Hansen (DEN)
26 May 2018; 15:15	Lazarov, Tournat 8	(17–14)	Remili 6	Lanxess Arena, Cologne; Attendance: 19,250; Referees: Gjeding, Hansen (DEN)
26 May 2018; 15:15	1× (yellow card) 5× (suspension)	Report	2× (yellow card) 4× (suspension)	Lanxess Arena, Cologne; Attendance: 19,250; Referees: Gjeding, Hansen (DEN)

26 May 2018; 18:00	Vardar (North Macedonia)	27–28	(France) Montpellier	Lanxess Arena, Cologne; Attendance: 19,250; Referees: Elíasson, Pálsson (ISL)
26 May 2018; 18:00	Borozan, Cindrić 6	(11–14)	Porte 8	Lanxess Arena, Cologne; Attendance: 19,250; Referees: Elíasson, Pálsson (ISL)
26 May 2018; 18:00	4× (yellow card) 2× (suspension)	Report	3× (yellow card) 4× (suspension)	Lanxess Arena, Cologne; Attendance: 19,250; Referees: Elíasson, Pálsson (ISL)

=== Third place game ===
27 May 2018; 15:15	Paris Saint-Germain (France)	29–28	(North Macedonia) Vardar	Lanxess Arena, Cologne; Attendance: 19,257; Referees: Lah, Sok (SLO)
27 May 2018; 15:15	Remili 9	(14–15)	Cindrić 7	Lanxess Arena, Cologne; Attendance: 19,257; Referees: Lah, Sok (SLO)
27 May 2018; 15:15	3× (yellow card) 5× (suspension)	Report	2× (yellow card) 4× (suspension) 1× (red card)	Lanxess Arena, Cologne; Attendance: 19,257; Referees: Lah, Sok (SLO)

=== Final ===
27 May 2018; 18:00	HBC Nantes (France)	27–32	(France) Montpellier	Lanxess Arena, Cologne; Attendance: 19,250; Referees: López, Ramírez (ESP)
27 May 2018; 18:00	Lazarov 6	(13–16)	Fabregas, Simonet 6	Lanxess Arena, Cologne; Attendance: 19,250; Referees: López, Ramírez (ESP)
27 May 2018; 18:00	2× (yellow card) 2× (suspension)	Report	1× (yellow card) 3× (suspension)	Lanxess Arena, Cologne; Attendance: 19,250; Referees: López, Ramírez (ESP)
