= Tim Sørensen =

Tim Sørensen may refer to:

- Tim Sørensen (handballer) (born 1992), Danish handball player
- Tim Sørensen (speedway rider) (born 2000), Danish speedway rider
