= Marius Mocanu =

Romanian handball player (born 1986)

Personal information
- Full name: Marius Mocanu
- Nationality: Romanian
- Born: 9 December 1986 (age 39) Călărași, Romania
- Height: 1.95 m (6 ft 5 in)

Sport
- Sport: Handball
- Position: Line player
- Current club: CSM Alexandria
- Number: 66
National team
- Years: Team
- –: Romania

Marius Mocanu (born 9 December 1986) is a Romanian handballer who plays for CSM Fagaras and the Romania national team.

== Achievements ==
- Liga Națională:
  - Winner: 2010, 2011, 2016, 2017, 2018
  - The Romanian Cup 2017
  - The Supercup 2017
  - Bronze 2015
  - Silver 2019

== Individual awards ==
- All-Star Pivot of the Liga Națională: 2017, 2018
