= Dmitrii Santalov =

Russian handball player

Personal information
- Nationality: Russian
- Born: 7 April 1996 (age 30) Blagoveshchensk, Russia
- Height: 1.96 m (6 ft 5 in)

Sport
- Sport: Handball
- Position: Left back
- Current club: Chekhovskiye Medvedi
- Number: 3

Senior clubs
- Years: Team
- 2015–2020: Chekhovskiye Medvedi
- 2020–2022: HC Meshkov Brest
- 2022–2025: Chekhovskiye Medvedi
National team
Years	Team	Apps	(Gls)
2019–	Russia	22	(53)

Dmitrii Santalov (born 7 April 1996) is a Russian handball player for Chekhovskiye Medvedi and the Russian national team.

He represented Russia at the 2020 European Men's Handball Championship.
