= Tim Sørensen (handballer) =

Danish handball player (born 1992)

Tim D. Sørensen
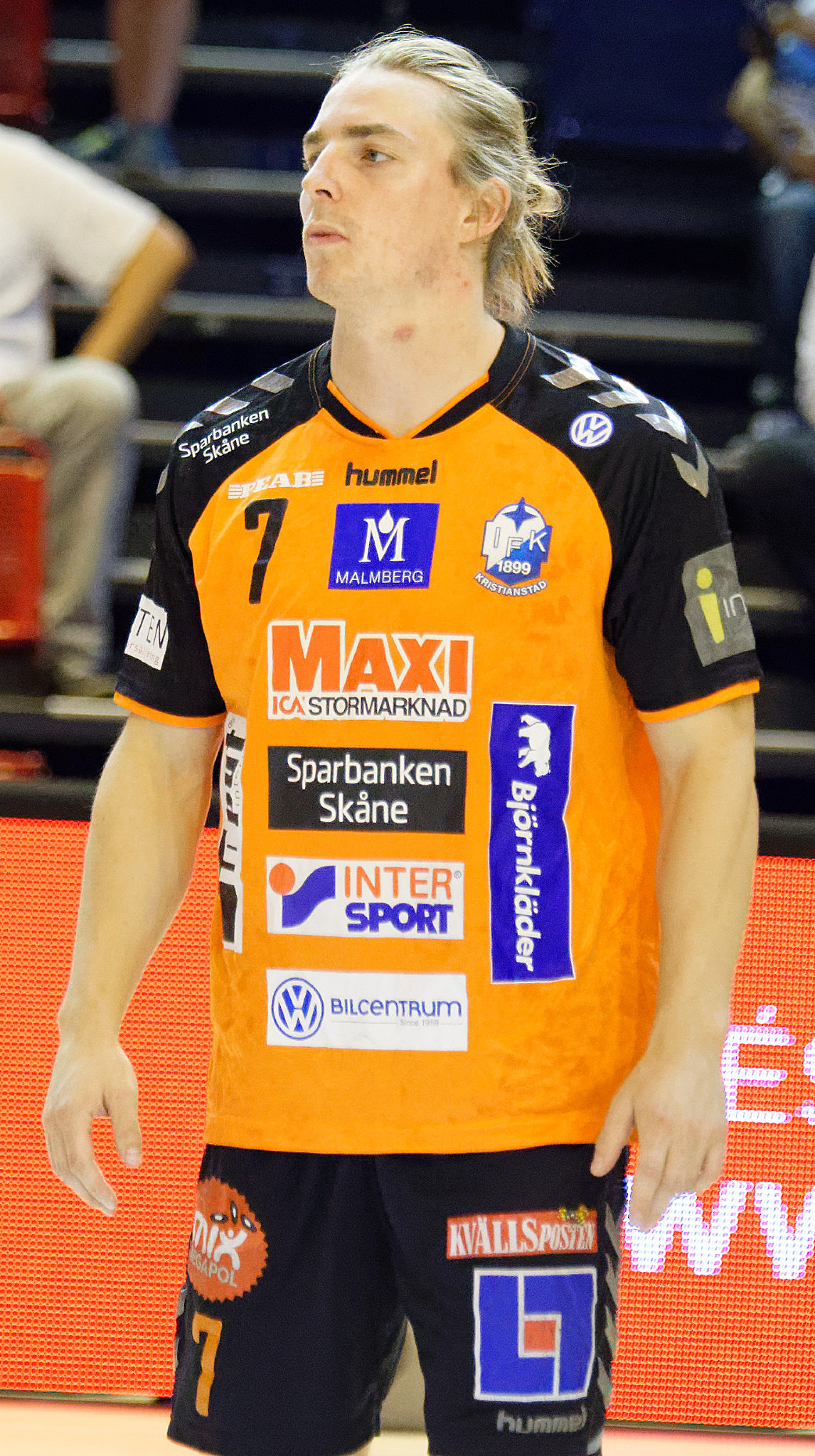

Personal information
- Nationality: Danish
- Born: 10 February 1992 (age 34) Skive, Denmark
- Height: 1.78 m (5 ft 10 in)

Sport
- Sport: Handball
- Position: Right wing
- Current club: Mors-Thy Håndbold
- Number: 7

Senior clubs
- Years: Team
- Skive fH
- –2016: Skanderborg Håndbold
- 2016–2018: IFK Kristianstad
- 2018–2020: Frisch Auf Göppingen
- 2020–: Mors-Thy Håndbold
National team
Years	Team	Apps	(Gls)
2017–	Denmark	2	(4)

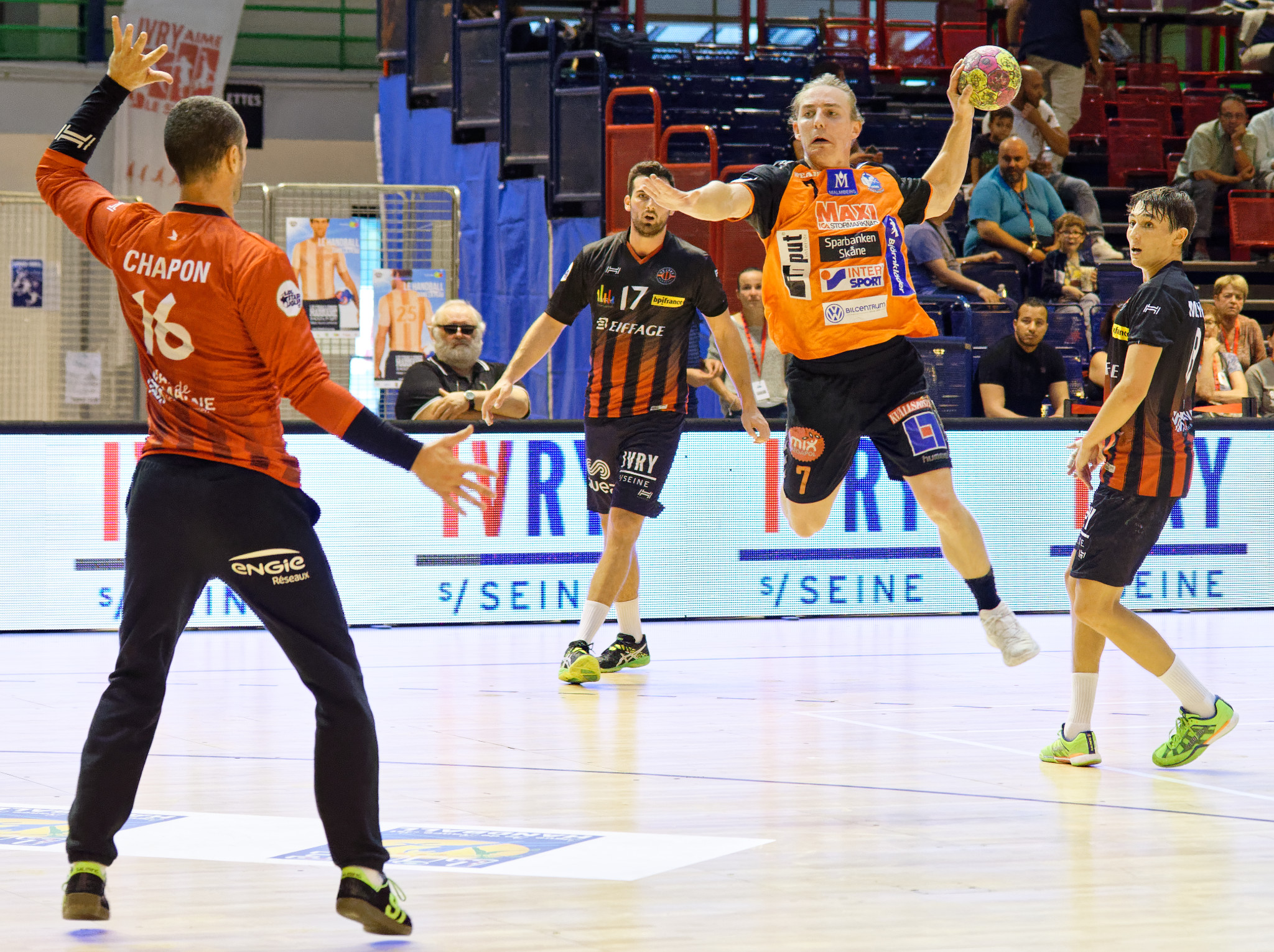
Sept. 4, 2016.

Tim D. Sørensen (born 10 February 1992) is a Danish handballer who plays for Mors-Thy Håndbold and the national team.
