= David Balaguer =

Spanish handball player (born 1991)

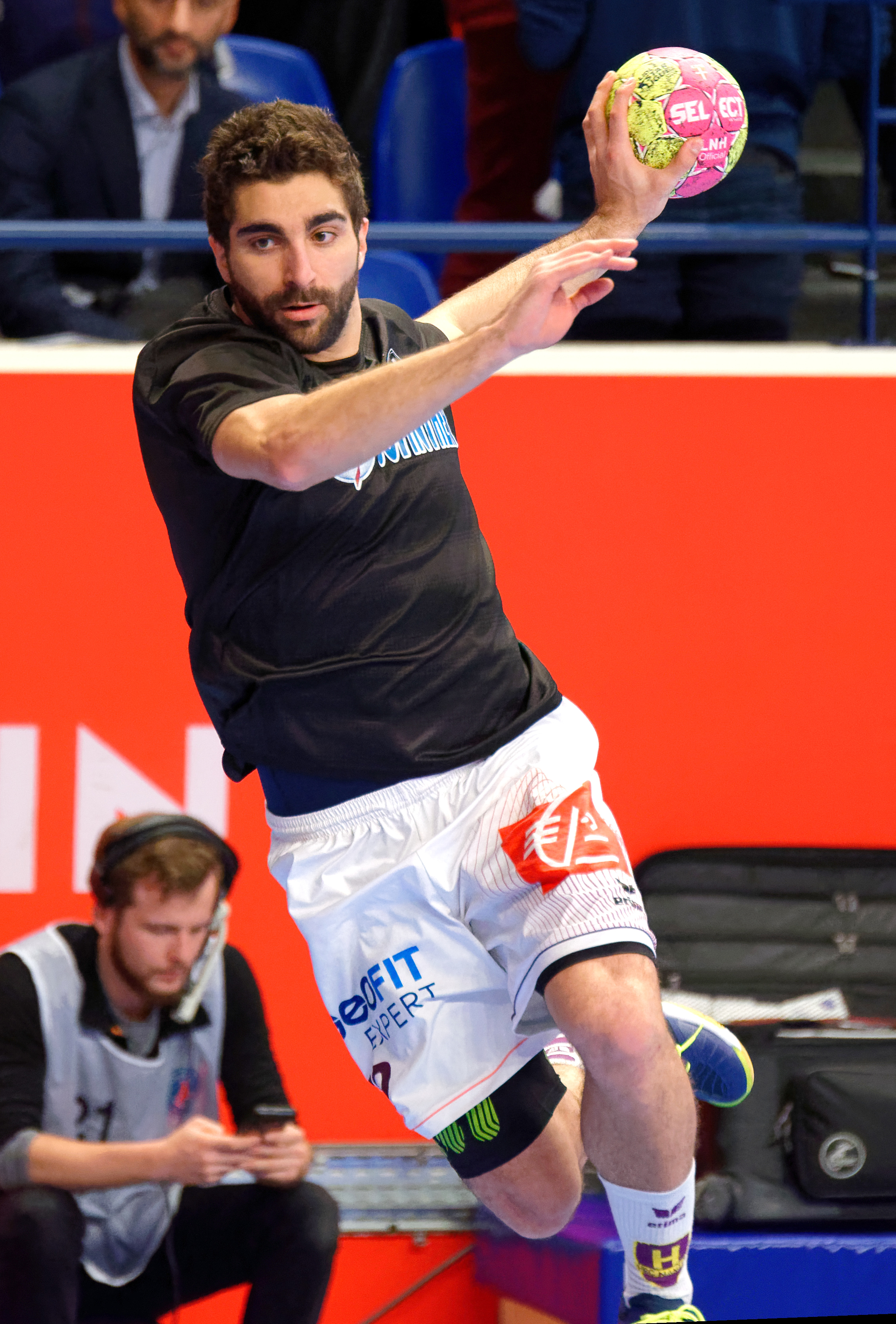

Personal information
- Full name: David Balaguer Romeu
- Nationality: Spanish
- Born: 17 August 1991 (age 35) Barcelona, Spain
- Height: 1.85 m (6 ft 1 in)

Sport
- Sport: Handball
- Position: Right wing
- Current club: Montpellier Handball
- Number: 34

Senior clubs
- Years: Team
- 2011–2014: FC Barcelona
- 2014–2015: Globalcaja Ciudad Encantada
- 2015–2022: HBC Nantes
- 2022–2025: Paris Saint-Germain
- 2025–: Montpellier Handball
National team
Years	Team	Apps	(Gls)
2017–	Spain	43	(137)
Medal record
European Championship
Gold medal – first place	2018 Croatia
- Updated on 25 June 2022

David Balaguer Romeu (born 17 August 1991) is a Spanish handball player who plays for Montpellier Handball and the Spanish team.

He participated at the 2017 World Men's Handball Championship.
