= Rémi Desbonnet =

French handball player (born 1992)

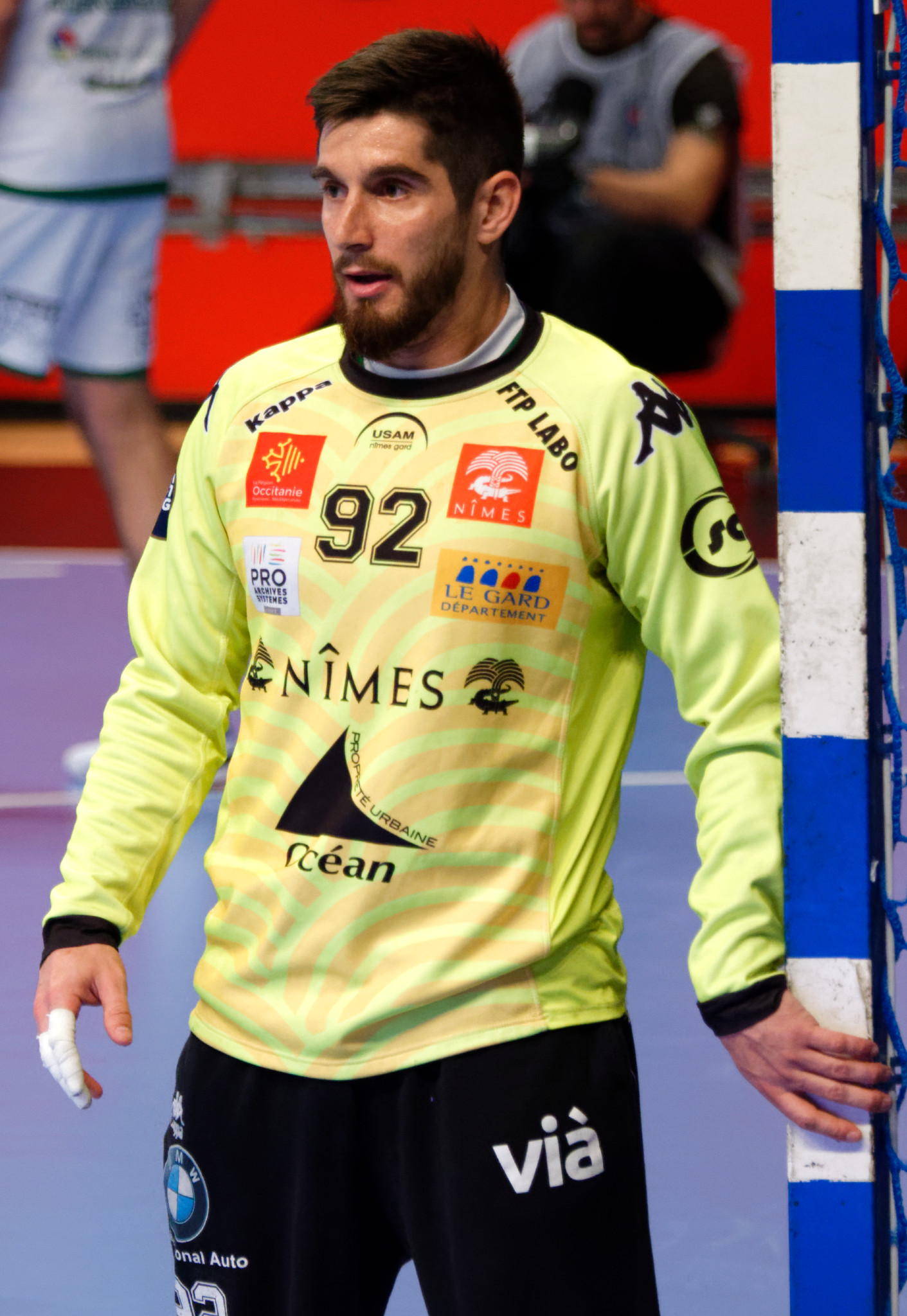

Personal information
- Nationality: French
- Born: 28 February 1992 (age 34) Montpellier, France
- Height: 1.82 m (6 ft 0 in)

Sport
- Sport: Handball
- Position: Goalkeeper
- Current club: Montpellier Handball
- Number: 92

Senior clubs
- Years: Team
- 2012–2013: Montpellier Handball
- 2013–2022: USAM Nîmes Gard
- 2022–: Montpellier Handball
National team
Years	Team	Apps	(Gls)
2021–	France	66	(6)
Medal record
World Championship
Silver medal – second place	2023 Poland/Sweden
Bronze medal – third place	2025 Croatia/Denmark/Norway
European Championship
Gold medal – first place	2024 Germany
- Updated on 14 January 2026

Rémi Desbonnet (born 28 February 1992) is a French handballer for Montpellier Handball and the French national team.

== Career ==
Desbonnet started playing handball at his hometown club Montpellier Handball. His senior debut came in 2012 where he was the back-up goalkeeper to Mickaël Robin. In this season he won the French Cup and finished 3rd in the league.

When Thierry Omeyer joined the club in 2013, Desbonnet was pushed back in the pecking order, and therefore he joined USAM Nîmes Gard. In the 2017/2018 season he reached the final of the French cup with the club.

In 2022 he returned to his boyhood club on a two year deal.

=== National team ===
He debuted for the French national on 2 May 2021 against Greece.

At the 2022 European Men's Handball Championship he won bronze medals. He was only included later in the squad to replace Wesley Pardin. At the 2023 World Men's Handball Championship he was part of the french team together with Vincent Gérard and Charles Bolzinger. Here he won a silver medal.

At the 2024 European Men's Handball Championship he won gold medals. He played in every match at the tournament.

At the 2025 World Championship he won bronze medals with France, losing to Croatia in the semifinal and beating Portugal in the third place playoff.

== Honours ==
- Coupe de France
  - Winner: 2013
