= Michaël Guigou =

French handball player (born 1982)

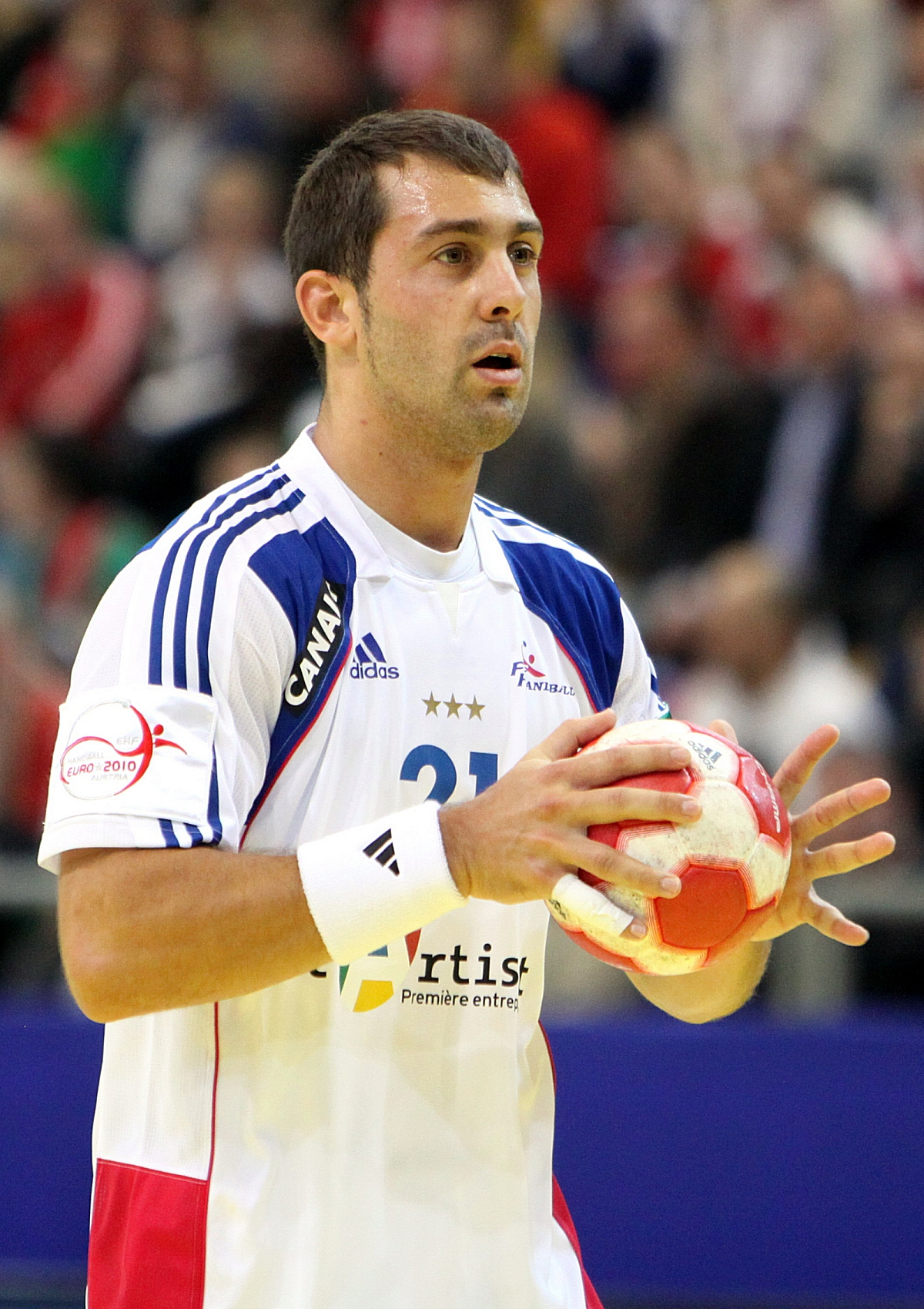
- Guigou in 2010

Personal information
- Nationality: French
- Born: 28 January 1982 (age 44) Apt, France
- Height: 1.80 m (5 ft 11 in)

Sport
- Sport: Handball
- Position: Left wing

Youth career
- Years: Team
- 1988–1998: Handball Pays d'Apt
- 1998–1999: Avignon

Senior clubs
- Years: Team
- 1999–2019: Montpellier Handball
- 2019–2022: USAM Nîmes Gard
National team
| Years | Team | Apps | (Gls) |
| 2002–2021 | France | 307 | (1021) |

Teams managed
- 2024–: France Junior national team
Medal record
Olympic Games
| Gold medal – first place | 2008 Beijing | Team |
| Gold medal – first place | 2012 London | Team |
| Gold medal – first place | 2020 Tokyo | Team |
| Silver medal – second place | 2016 Rio de Janeiro | Team |
World Championship
| Gold medal – first place | 2009 Croatia |
| Gold medal – first place | 2011 Sweden |
| Gold medal – first place | 2015 Qatar |
| Gold medal – first place | 2017 France |
| Bronze medal – third place | 2005 Tunisia |
| Bronze medal – third place | 2019 Germany/Denmark |
European Championship
| Gold medal – first place | 2006 Switzerland |
| Gold medal – first place | 2010 Austria |
| Gold medal – first place | 2014 Denmark |
| Bronze medal – third place | 2018 Croatia |

Michaël Guigou (born 28 January 1982) is a French former handball player and current coach. As a player he played the French national team.

He was included in the European Handball Federation Hall of Fame in 2023.

Regular member of the France national team, he was on the team that won the gold medal at three Olympics (2008, 2012, and 2020), four World championships (2009, 2011, 2015, and 2017) and three European championships (2006, 2010, and 2014). During the final at the 2009 world championship, he was the highest scorer in one match with 10 goals (including 7 penalties out of 7) and finished as highest scorer of the French team with 52 goals.

== Club career ==
He joined Montpellier Handball 1999 as his first professional club, after playing youth handball at Apt and Avignon. With Montpellier he won the French championship 10 times, the French Cup 7 times and the EHF Champions League twice. In 2019, after 20 years in Montpellier Handball, he joined USAM Nîmes Gard. He retired in 2022 at the age of 40.

== Coaching career ==
In September 2024, he became the coach for the French Junior national team.

== Achievements ==
=== Club ===
- EHF Champions League:
  - Winner in 2003, 2018
- EHF Cup:
  - Runners up in 2014
- French league (10): 2002, 2003, 2004, 2005, 2006, 2008, 2009, 2010, 2011, 2012
- French Cup (11): 2001, 2002, 2003, 2005, 2006, 2008, 2009, 2010, 2012, 2013, 2016
- French League Cup (10): 2004, 2005, 2006, 2007, 2008, 2010, 2011, 2012, 2014, 2016
- French Supercup: 2010, 2011, 2018

=== International ===
- Olympics
  - Gold: 2008, 2012, 2020
  - Silver: 2016
- World championship
  - Gold: 2009, 2011, 2015, 2017
  - Bronze: 2005, 2019
- European championship
  - Gold: 2006, 2010, 2014
  - Bronze: 2018

=== Individual ===
- All-Star Left wing of the World Championship: 2009
- Best player of French league (11): 2003, 2004, 2005, 2006, 2007, 2009, 2010, 2011, 2014, 2015, 2018
- EHF Hall of Fame in 2023.

== See also ==
- List of men's handballers with 1000 or more international goals
