= Andrej Golic =

French handball player (born 1974)

Andrej Golić
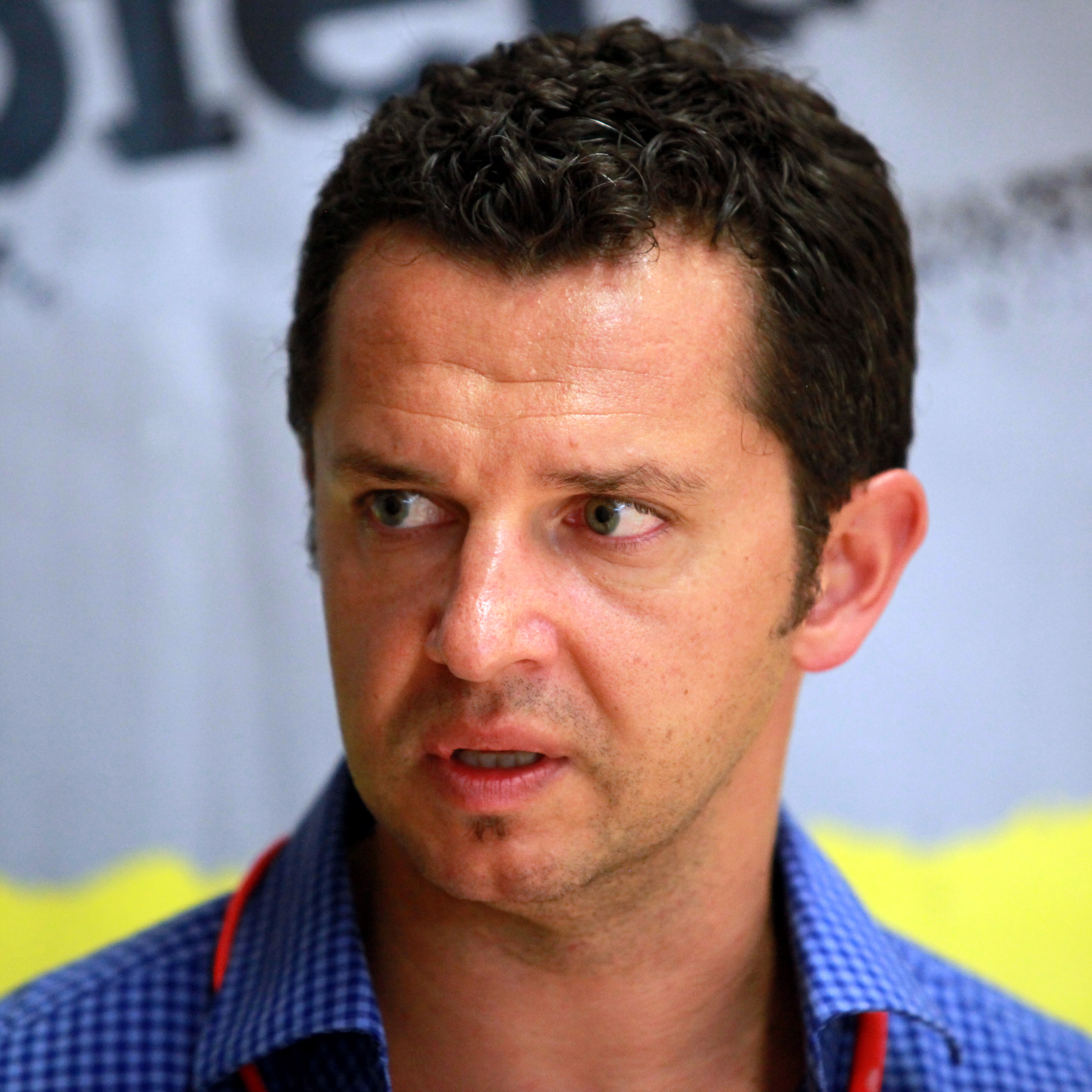
- Golić in 2012

Personal information
- Born: 10 February 1974 (age 52) Banja Luka, SFR Yugoslavia, Bosnia and Herzegovina
- Height: 182 cm (72 in)

Sport
- Sport: Handball
- Position: Centre back

Senior clubs
- Years: Team
- -1992: RK Borac Banja Luka
- 1992: USAM Nîmes
- 1992-2006: Montpellier HB
- 2006-2007: RK Zagreb
National team
Years	Team	Apps	(Gls)
–	France	149	(368)
Medal record
Men's handball
Representing France
World Championship
Gold medal – first place	2001 France	Team
Bronze medal – third place	2003 Portugal	Team
Bronze medal – third place	2005 Tunisia	Team
Mediterranean Games
Bronze medal – third place	2001 Tunis	Team competition

Andrej Golić (born 10 February 1974 in Banja Luka, SFR Yugoslavia, Bosnia and Herzegovina) is a French team handball player.

== Handball career ==
Andrej Golić is the son of the former handball player and coach for Yugoslavia Borislav Golić. His mother is Macedonian.

He started playing handball at Borac Banja Luka, where he made his debut at the age of 15. In 1992 he moved to France, as his father became the coach of USAM Nîmes Gard.

He then joined Montpellier HB, where he played until 2006. In this period he won the French Championship 8 times and the 2002-03 EHF Champions League. He then joined Croatian RK Zagreb, where he played for a year before retiring. In his only season in Croatia he won the domestic double.

He achieved French citizenship in 1998, and then went on to represent France. He was part of the team that won the 2001 World Men's Handball Championship, and won bronze medals at the 2003 and 2005 World Championships.

He also competed at the 2000 Summer Olympics in Sydney, where the French team placed sixth.

== Titles ==
=== Borac Banja Luka ===
- 1990-91 IHF Cup

=== Montpellier Handball ===
- French Championship (8): 1995, 1998, 1999, 2000, 2002, 2003, 2004, 2005
- French Cup (6): 1999, 2000, 2001, 2002, 2003, 2005
- French League Cup (1): 2005
- 2002-03 EHF Champions League

=== RK Zagreb ===
- Croatian Championship (1): 2007
- Croatian Handball Cup (1): 2007
