= Sébastien Bosquet =

French handball player (born 1979)

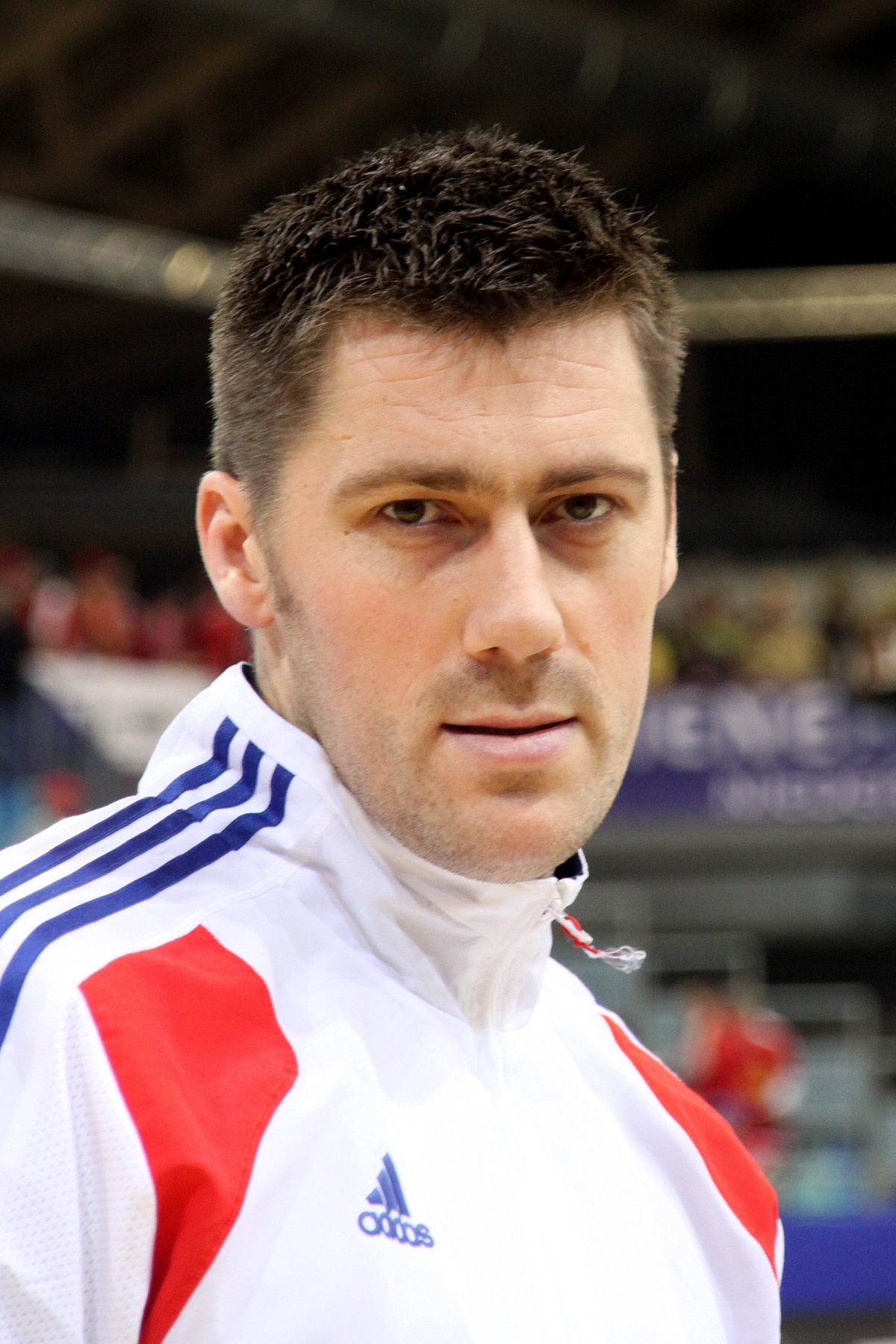

Personal information
- Nationality: French
- Born: 24 February 1979 (age 47) Dunkerque, France
- Height: 198 cm (78 in)

Sport
- Sport: Handball
- Position: Right back

Youth career
- Years: Team
- –: US Dunkerque

Senior clubs
- Years: Team
- 1999-2003: Dunkerque HGL
- 2003-2005: Montpellier Handball
- 2005-2013: Dunkerque HGL
- 2013-2015: Tremblay-en-France Handball
National team
Years	Team	Apps	(Gls)
2002-2013	France	112	(202)

Teams managed
- 2024-: Reims Champagne HB
Medal record
Representing France
World Championship
Gold medal – first place	2009 Croatia	Team
European Championships
Gold medal – first place	2006 Switzerland	Team competition
Gold medal – first place	2010 Austria	Team competition

Sébastien Bosquet (born 24 February 1979 in Dunkerque) is a French team handball player and coach. He played on the France men's national handball team which won gold medals at the 2009 World Men's Handball Championship in Croatia.

In January 2024 he became the coach of Reims Champagne Handball women's team, that plays in the third tier of French handball, Nationale 1.
