= Arthur Lenne =

French handball player (born 2001)

Personal information
- Nationality: French
- Born: 2 May 2001 (age 25) Colmar, France
- Height: 1.94 m (6 ft 4 in)

Sport
- Sport: Handball
- Position: Pivot
- Current club: Montpellier Handball
- Number: 19

Youth career
- Years: Team
- -2018: Sélestat AHB

Senior clubs
- Years: Team
- 2018-2019: Sélestat AHB
- 2019–: Montpellier Handball
National team
Years	Team	Apps	(Gls)
2021–	France	2	(2)
- Updated on 23 August 2022

Arthur Lenne (born 2 May 2001) is a French handball player who plays for Montpellier Handball and the French national handball team.

His senior debut came in the 2018/19 season for the second tier club Sélestat AHB. In joined Montpellier Handball the following summer. In his first season at his new club he played for the second team in the third tier of French handball, Nationale 1. He debuted for the senior team in 2020.

His national debut came on November 6th 2021 against Denmark.

He is the younger brother of fellow Montpellier player Yanis Lenne, who also plays for Montpellier.
