= Didier Dinart =

French handball player (born 1977)

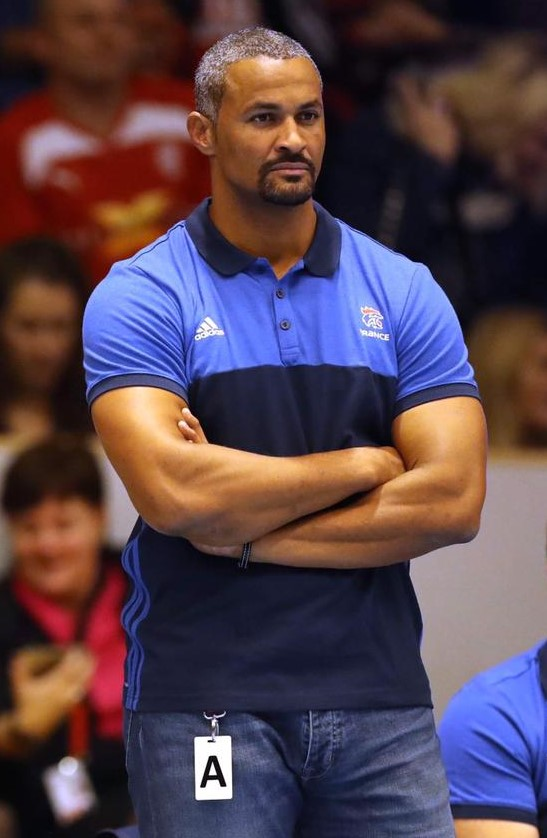
- Dinart in 2018

Personal information
- Nationality: French
- Born: 18 January 1977 (age 49) Pointe-à-Pitre, Guadeloupe
- Height: 1.97 m (6 ft 6 in)

Sport
- Sport: Handball
- Position: Pivot
- Current club: US Ivry Handball (head coach)

Senior clubs
- Years: Team
- –1997: Dijon Bourgogne HB
- 1997–2003: Montpellier Handball
- 2003–2011: BM Ciudad Real
- 2011–2012: Atlético Madrid
- 2012–2013: PSG Handball
National team
Years	Team	Apps	(Gls)
1996–2012	France	231	(133)
Title
1998–2003	French Champion (DIM)	Montpellier	
1999–2003	French Cup	Montpellier	

Teams managed
- 2016–2020: France
- 2021–2022: Saudi Arabia
- 2023–: US Ivry Handball
- 2024–: Montenegro
Medal record
Men's handball
Representing France
Olympic Games
Gold medal – first place	2008 Beijing	Team
Gold medal – first place	2012 London	Team
World Championship
Gold medal – first place	2001 France
Gold medal – first place	2009 Croatia
Gold medal – first place	2011 Sweden
Bronze medal – third place	2003 Portugal
Bronze medal – third place	2005 Tunisia
European Championship
Gold medal – first place	2006 Switzerland
Gold medal – first place	2010 Austria
Bronze medal – third place	2008 Norway
Mediterranean Games
Bronze medal – third place	2001 Tunis	Team

Didier Dinart (born 18 January 1977) is a French retired handball player and current coach of US Ivry Handball and the Montenegro national team.

He was included in the European Handball Federation Hall of Fame in 2023.

During his playing days, he played for the internationally renowned BM Ciudad Real handball team in Spain (where he was partner to, among others, Luc Abalo). Before joining BM Ciudad Real, he played for Montpellier HB of which is currently one of the best French clubs.

He was recognized as a skilled defensive player and is considered among the top handball defensive specialists internationally. This performance led to the nickname "La Roca" (The Rock) in Spain.

He is also one of the most enduring players of the national team: his first appearance on the team was on 20 December 1996 against Croatia. He won all three major titles in handball (European championship, world championship, Olympic championship). He has represented France at four Olympic Games, including winning the gold medal at the 2008 Beijing Olympics and the 2012 London Olympics.

== Honors ==
- World Cup : 2001, 2009, 2011
- EHF Champions League : 2003, 2006, 2008
- French Championship : 1998, 1999, 2000, 2002, 2003
- Spanish Championship : 2004
- Spanish Supercup : 2004
- Copa Asobal : 2004, 2005, 2006, 2007, 2008, 2011
- French Cup : 1999, 2000, 2001, 2002, 2003
- EHF Men’s Champions Trophy: 2006
