= Grégory Anquetil =

French handball player (born 1970)

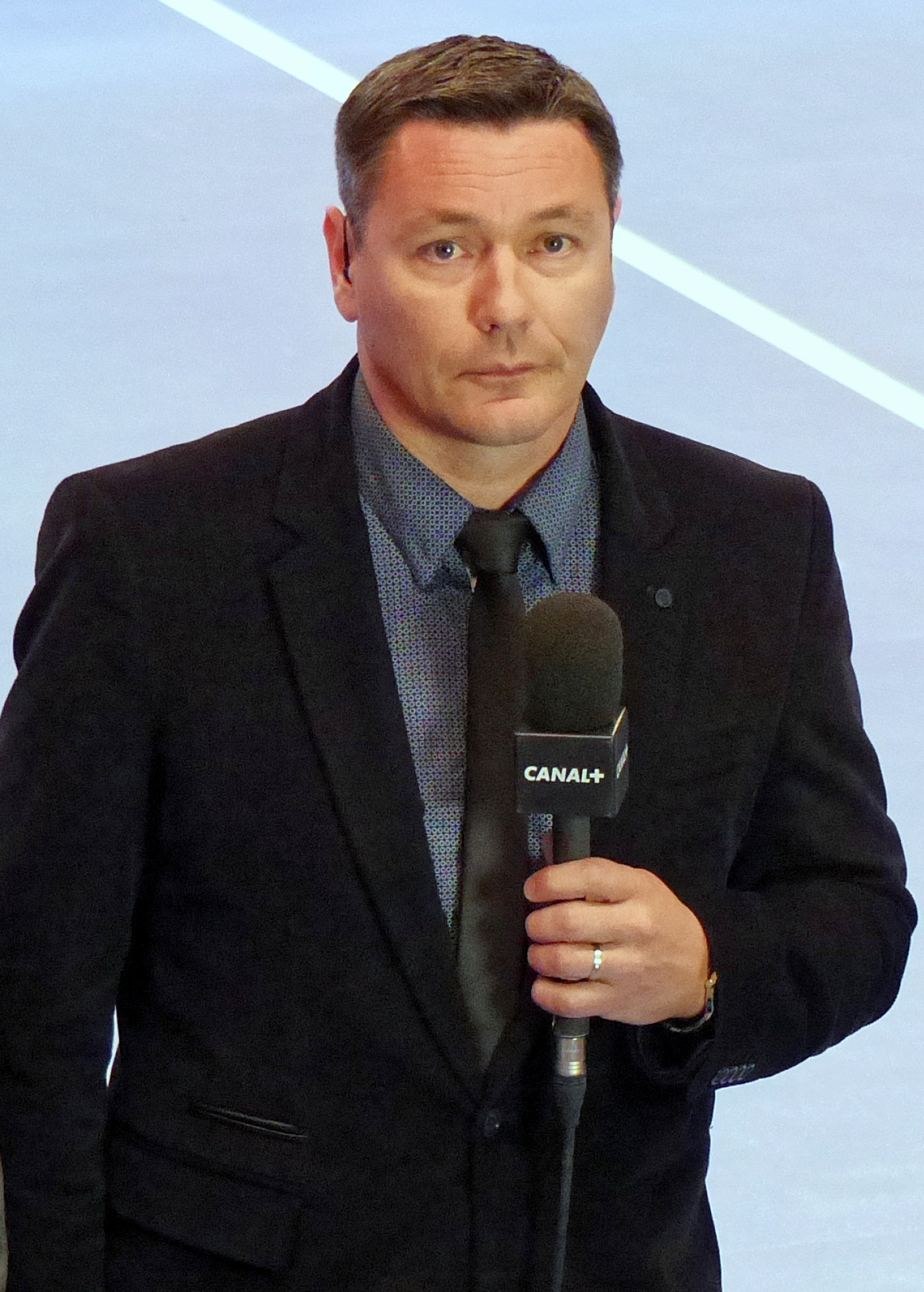
- Grégory Anquetil, former pro handball player and consultant for the Canal Plus channel, on 10 April 2014, during the Psg Handball / HBC Nantes match.

Personal information
- Nationality: French
- Born: 14 December 1970 (age 55) Harfleur, France
- Height: 178 cm (70 in)

Sport
- Sport: Handball
- Position: Right wing
- Current club: Retired

Senior clubs
- Years: Team
- –1989: ESM Gonfreville l’Orcher
- 1989–2007: Montpellier Handball
National team
Years	Team	Apps	(Gls)
1994–2005	France	169	(476)
Medal record
World Championship
Gold medal – first place	1995 Iceland
Gold medal – first place	2001 France
Bronze medal – third place	2003 Portugal
Bronze medal – third place	2005 Tunisia

Grégory Anquetil (born 14 December 1970) is a former French team handball player, who was part of the French team that won the 1995 World Championship; the first time France won a major international tournament. At club level he played almost his entire career for Montpellier Handball, where he was the club captain. He is named a knight of the French Legion of Honour.

After his retirement from the sport, he provides commentary for handball matches for Canal plus.

== Career ==
Anquetil started playing at his hometown club Gonfreville l'Orcher HB. In 1988 he joined Montpellier Handball which at the time played in the second tier of French handball. In 1992 he was promoted with the team to the top league in France. His finest accomplishment at club level came on 2003, when he won the EHF Champions League with the club. Additionally, he was part of the team that won the club's first French championship in 1995, first French cup in 1999 and first French League Cup in 2004. Additionally, he won French Championship a further 8 times at the club; in 1998, 1999, 2000, 2002, 2003, 2004, 2005 and 2006.

=== National team ===
He debuted for the French national team on 20 December 1994 against Norway in a preparation match for the 1995 World Championship. At the World Championship he was part of the French team that won gold medals. This was the first time, France won the title.

He won the title again at the 2001 World Men's Handball Championship.

He also competed at the 1996 Summer Olympics, where he placed fourth, and also at the 2000 and 2004 Summer Olympics.

Ahead of the 2004 European Championship he was named captain of the French national team in Jackson Richardson's absence.

== Titles ==
=== Club ===
- French Championship
  - Winner: 1995, 1998, 1999, 2000, 2002, 2003, 2004, 2005, 2006
- French Cup
  - Winner: 1999, 2000, 2001, 2002, 2003, 2005, 2006
  - Finalist: 1998
- French League Cup
  - Winner: 2004, 2005, 2006, 2007
  - Finalist: 2003
- EHF Champions League
  - Winner: 2005
- LNH Division 2
  - Winner: 1992

=== International ===
- World Championship
  - Winner: 1995, 2001
  - Bronze medals: 2001, 2005

== Private ==
His brother Frédéric Anquetil is also a handballer. His nephew Arthur Anquetil is also a handballer.
