= Karl Konan =

French handball player (born 1995)

Personal information
- Full name: Karl Olivier Konan
- Nationality: French/Ivorian
- Born: 3 June 1995 (age 31) Cocody, Ivory Coast
- Height: 1.96 m (6 ft 5 in)

Sport
- Sport: Handball
- Position: Left back/Pivot
- Current club: Paris Saint-Germain
- Number: 7

Senior clubs
- Years: Team
- 2015–2022: Pays d'Aix UC
- 2022–2025: Montpellier Handball
- 2025–: Paris Saint-Germain
National team
Years	Team	Apps	(Gls)
2021–	France	57	(8)
Medal record
World Championship
Bronze medal – third place	2025 Croatia/Denmark/Norway
European Championship
Gold medal – first place	2024 Germany
- Updated on 14 January 2026

Karl Olivier Konan (born 3 June 1995) is a French-Ivorian handball player for Paris Saint-Germain and the French national team. He is known as a defensive specialist.

Konan was born in Ivory Coast.

== Career ==
Konan started playing handball at Entente Sportive de Bingerville in the Ivory Coast. In 2014 he was spotted at a talent development tournament arranged by Daouda Karaboué and signed by Pays d'Aix UC. He was named as the best defensive player in the French League in the 2018/19, 2020/21 and 2021/22 seasons.

In 2022 he signed for Montpellier Handball. For the 2025-26 season he signed for league rivals Paris Saint-Germain.

=== National team ===
Konan debuted for the French national team on 2 May 2021 in a 46-30 win against Greece. His first major international tournament was the 2022 European Championship, where France finished 4th.

At the 2024 European Championship he won a Gold medal with the French team. He played all 9 matches and scored a single goal.

At the 2025 World Championship he won bronze medals with France, losing to Croatia in the semifinal and beating Portugal in the third place playoff. He played all 9 games and scored 1 goal.
