= Rabah Gherbi =

Algerian handball player (born 1970)

Personal information
- Nationality: Algeria
- Born: 3 September 1970 (age 56)
- Height: 186 cm (73 in)

Sport
- Sport: Handball
- Position: Centre back

Youth career
- Years: Team
- 1985–1987: ERC Alger

Senior clubs
- Years: Team
- 1987–1993: IRB Alger
- 1993–1996: Club Africain
- 1996–2000: Montpellier Handball
- 2000–2001: Angers Noyant HB
- 2001–2003: Montpellier Handball
National team
Years	Team	Apps
1989–2001	Algeria	4

Teams managed
- 2012–2013: Algeria (assistant)
- 2015–2016: Al-Qurain
- 2016–2017: Algeria (junior)
- 2017–2020: Kazma Sport Club
- 2021–2022: Saudi Arabia (assistant)
- Updated on only during the 1996 Summer Olympics

Rabah Gherbi (رابح غربي, born 3 September 1970) is an Algerian male handball player and coach. He was a member of the Algeria men's national handball team. He was part of the team at the 1996 Summer Olympics, playing four matches.
