= Jérôme Fernandez =

French handball player (born 1977)

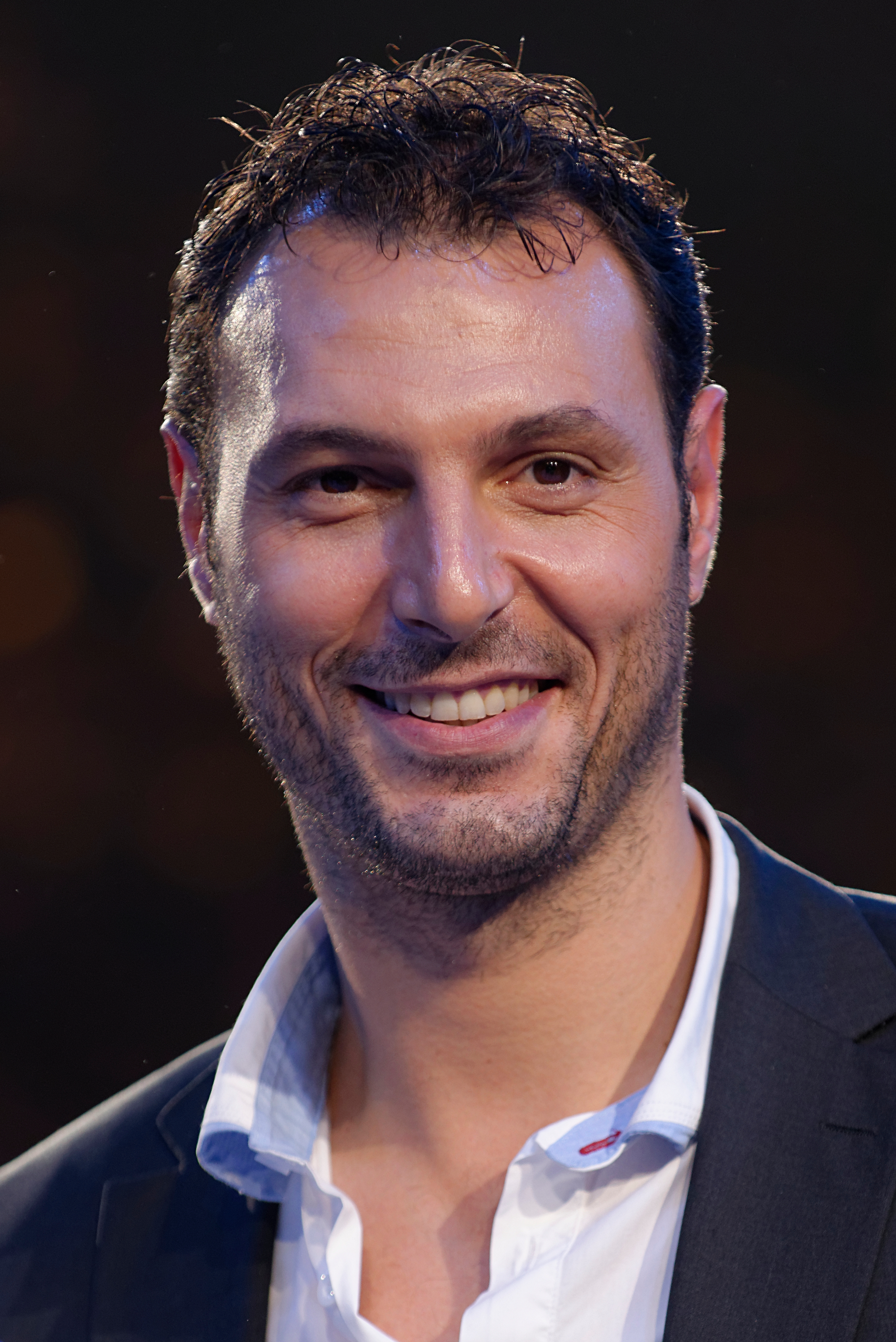
- Fernandez in 2013

Personal information
- Born: March 7, 1977 (age 49) Cenon, France
- Height: 1.99 m (6 ft 6 in)

Sport
- Sport: Handball
- Position: Left back

Youth career
- Years: Team
- 1985-1993: Carbon-Blanc HB

Senior clubs
- Years: Team
- 1993–1997: Girondins de Bordeaux HBC
- 1997–1999: Toulouse Union HB
- 1999–2002: Montpellier HB
- 2002–2008: FC Barcelona
- 2008–2010: BM Ciudad Real
- 2010–2011: THW Kiel
- 2011–2015: Toulouse Handball
- 2015–2017: Pays d'Aix UC
National team
Years	Team	Apps	(Gls)
1997–2015	France	390	(1463)

Teams managed
- 2016-2017: Pays d'Aix UC Assistant
- 2017-2020: Pays d'Aix UC
Medal record
Olympic Games
Gold medal – first place	2008 Beijing	Team
Gold medal – first place	2012 London	Team
World Championship
Gold medal – first place	2001 France
Gold medal – first place	2009 Croatia
Gold medal – first place	2011 Sweden
Gold medal – first place	2015 Qatar
Bronze medal – third place	2003 Portugal
Bronze medal – third place	2005 Tunisia
European Championship
Gold medal – first place	2006 Switzerland
Gold medal – first place	2010 Austria
Gold medal – first place	2014 Denmark
Bronze medal – third place	2008 Norway
Mediterranean Games
Bronze medal – third place	2001 Tunis	Team

Jérôme Fernandez (born 7 March 1977) is a French handball coach and former handball player. He was a captain of the France men's national handball team and currently holds the record for the number of goals for France's national team (1,463 through 9 January 2020). He is in the French handball Hall of Fame.

He is a knight of the Legion of Honour and an officer of the Ordre national du Mérite.

== Career ==
Fernandez began playing handball at the Club La Bastidienne. In 1985 he joined Carbon-Blanc. In 1993 he joined Girondins de Bordeaux HBC and in 1997 he joined Toulouse Union HB. Here he won the French cup in 1997-98. In 1999 he joined Montpellier Handball, where he won the 1999-2000 and 2001-02 French championship and the French cup three times in a row from 1999-2000 to 2001-02.

In 2002 he moved to Spain to join FC Barcelona. Here he won the 2002-03 and 2005-06 Spanish Championship and the 2003-04 and 2006-07 Copa del Rey, the 2003-04 Spanish Supercup, Copa ASOBAL and European Supercup. In 2008 he joined league rivals BM Ciudad Real. Here he won the 2008-09 and 2009-10 Spanish championship and the 2009-10 EHF Champions League.

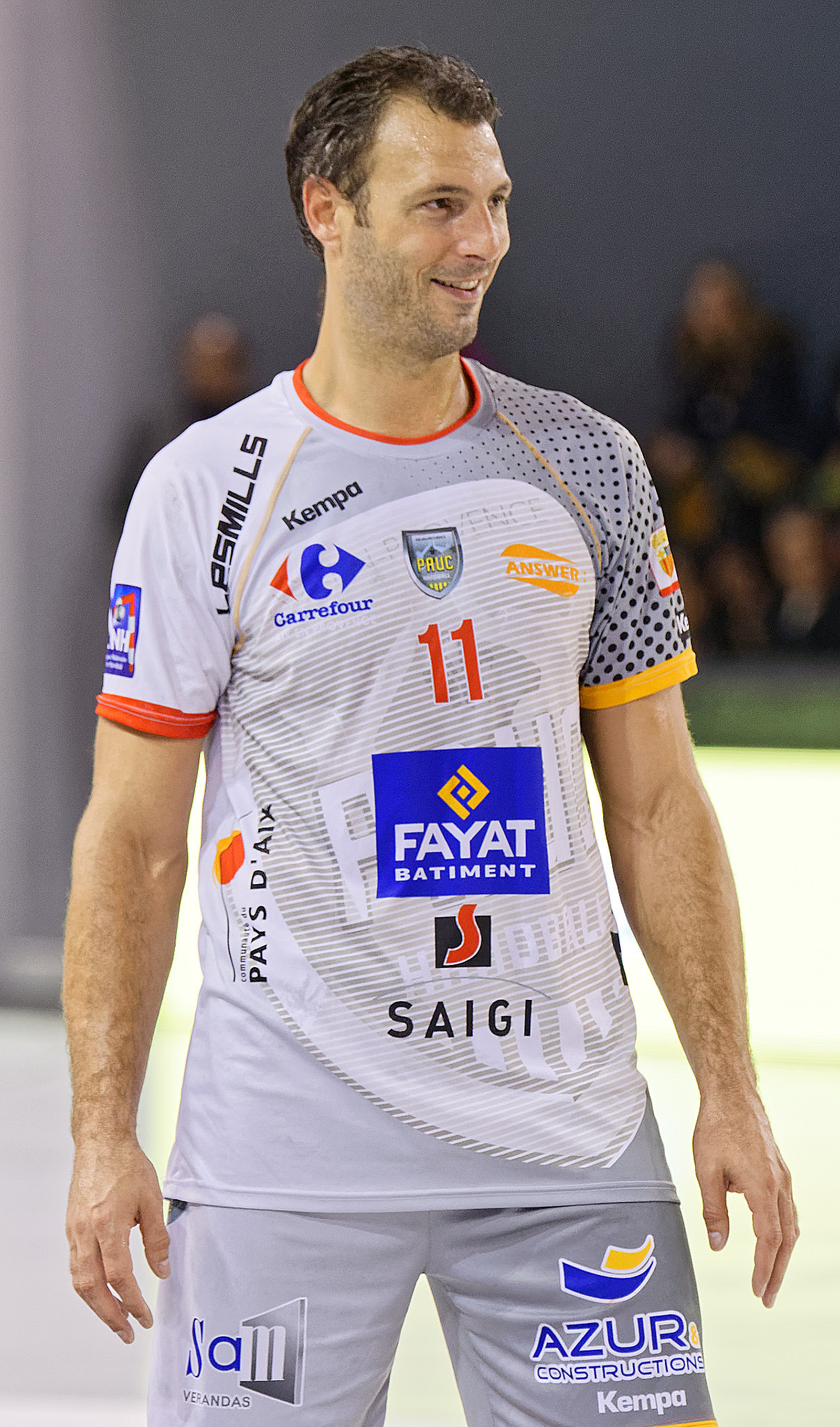
Fernandez with PAUC, 28 October 2015.

In 2010 he joined German champions THW Kiel to replace the injured Daniel Narcisse. The season after he returned to France and joined Fenix Toulouse Handball. He was in contact with several French clubs including Toulouse, Paris, Nantes and Dunkerque.] In 2015 he joined Pays d'Aix UC. where he became the player-assistant manager under Marc Wiltberger. He retired in 2017.

== Coaching career ==
His coaching career began as the player-assistant coach at Pays d'Aix UC in 2015, and in 2016 he became the player-coach. From 2017 to 2000 he was the head coach of the club.

== Honours ==
- Olympic Games: 2000 (sixth), 2004 (fifth), 2008 (Gold)2012 (Gold)
- World Championship: 2001, 2009, 2011, 2015
- European Championship: 2006, 2010, 2014
- EHF Champions League: 2005
- EHF Cup: 2003
- European Supercup: 2004
- Spanish Supercup: 2004
- Copa del Rey: 2004
- French Championship: 2000, 2002
- Spanish Championship: 2003
- French Cup: 1998, 2000, 2001, 2002
- DHB-Pokal: 2011
- German Supercup: 2011
- IHF Super Globe: 2011

== See also ==
- List of men's handballers with 1000 or more international goals
