= RD Prule 67 =

Prule 67
- Full name: Rokometno društvo Prule 67
- Founded: 1967; 59 years ago
- Dissolved: 2005; 21 years ago
- Arena: Hala Tivoli, Ljubljana
- Capacity: 4,050
- Club colours
| Home | Away |

Rokometno društvo Prule 67, commonly referred to as RD Prule 67 or simply Prule 67, was a handball club from Ljubljana, Slovenia. Due to financial problems, the club was dissolved in 2005. They have won the Slovenian First League of Handball once, in the 2001–02 season.

== Club honours ==
=== Domestic ===
- Winners of the Slovenian First League and Slovenian Cup in the 2001–02 season

=== European record ===
- 1999–2000 EHF Cup Winners' Cup – Semi-finals
- 2000–01 EHF Cup Winners' Cup – Quarter-finals
- 2001–02 EHF Cup – Round 3
- 2002–03 EHF Champions League – Semi-finals
- 2003–04 EHF Champions League – Round of 16
