= Bruno Martini (handballer) =

French handball player (born 1970)

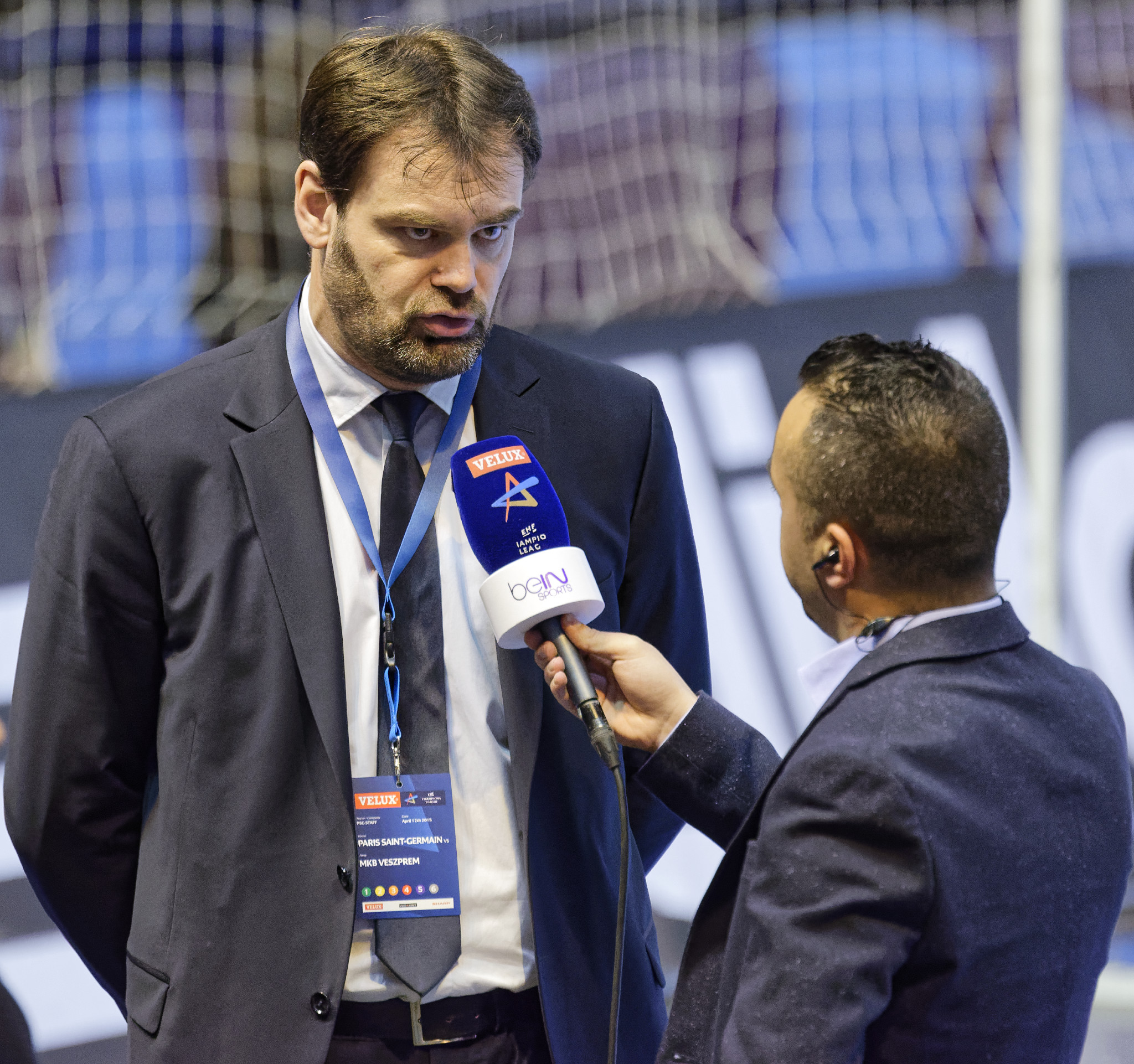
- Bruno Martini (left) during an interview with a beIN Sports presenter in 2015

Personal information
- Nationality: French
- Born: 3 July 1970 (age 56) Salon-de-Provence, France
- Height: 197 cm (78 in)

Sport
- Sport: Handball
- Position: Goalkeeper
- Current club: Retired

Youth career
- Years: Team
- –: SSMC Miramas
- –: SMUC Marseille

Senior clubs
- Years: Team
- -1989: SMUC Marseille
- 1989-1994: OM Vitrolles
- 1994-1995: Istres Provence Handball
- 1995-1996: OM Vitrolles
- 1996-1997: SD Teucro
- 1997-1998: Spacer's Toulouse
- 1998-1999: CB Cangas
- 1999-2000: HC Wuppertal
- 2000-2003: Montpellier Handball
- 2003-2005: Paris Handball
- 2003-2005: USAM Nîmes
- 2009: THW Kiel
National team
Years	Team	Apps	(Gls)
1990-2007	France	202	(0)
Medal record
World Championships
Gold medal – first place	1995 Iceland
Gold medal – first place	2001 France
Bronze medal – third place	2003 Portugal
Bronze medal – third place	2005 Tunisia

Bruno Martini (born 1970) is a French former team handball goalkeeper. He was a part of the French national team that won the 1995 World Championship; the first time France ever won a major international tournament.

== Career ==
Martini played for the OM Vitrolles between 1991-1994, where he won the EHF Cup Winners' Cup in 1993 and the French Championship in 1994. In 1994, he joined Istres Provence Handball, where he played for a year before returning to OM Vitrolles. Here he once again won the French championship, before leaving for Spanish SD Teucro, when OM Vitrolles went bankrupt and were administratively relegated.

After a year in Spain, he returned to France and played for Spacer's Toulouse. Here he won the Coupe de France in 1998, before joining the Spanish team BM Cangas. In the 1999-2000 season, he joined German Bundesliga side HC Wuppertal.

From 2000 to 2003, he played for Montpellier Handball, where he won the French championship and Cup in 2002 and 2003. At the end of his career, he also played for Paris Handball and USAM Nîmes.

In March 2009 he came back from retirement to join German side THW Kiel to replace the injured Andreas Palicka. In that season he won both the Bundesliga and the DHB-Pokal.

=== National team ===
Martini played a total of 202 national team games for France. He debuted in 1990, a month after turning 20, against the Soviet Union.

With France, he won the 1995 and 2001 World Championships. At the 1997 and 2003 World Championships he won bronze medals with the French team. He also competed at the 1996 Summer Olympics, where he placed 4th with the French team, and also at the 2000 Summer Olympics, where the team placed 6th.

== Post-playing career ==
Together with his wife, Sonia, he had the marketing company MP Sport, which works with the French league and several French clubs.

From 2010 until 15 January 2021 he was the General Manager at Paris Saint-Germain.

In November 2021, he was elected as the President of the French handball league, Ligue Nationale de Handball.

== Sexual abuse trial ==
In January 2023, it became public that Martini was under investigation for sexual abuse against a minor and possession of child pornography. He agreed to a 1 year suspended sentence as a Plea bargain and withdrew from the presidency of the French league. He was replaced by David Tebib.

He had been made a knight of the French Legion of Honour, but was excluded following the trial.
