= Yanis Lenne =

French handball player (born 1996)

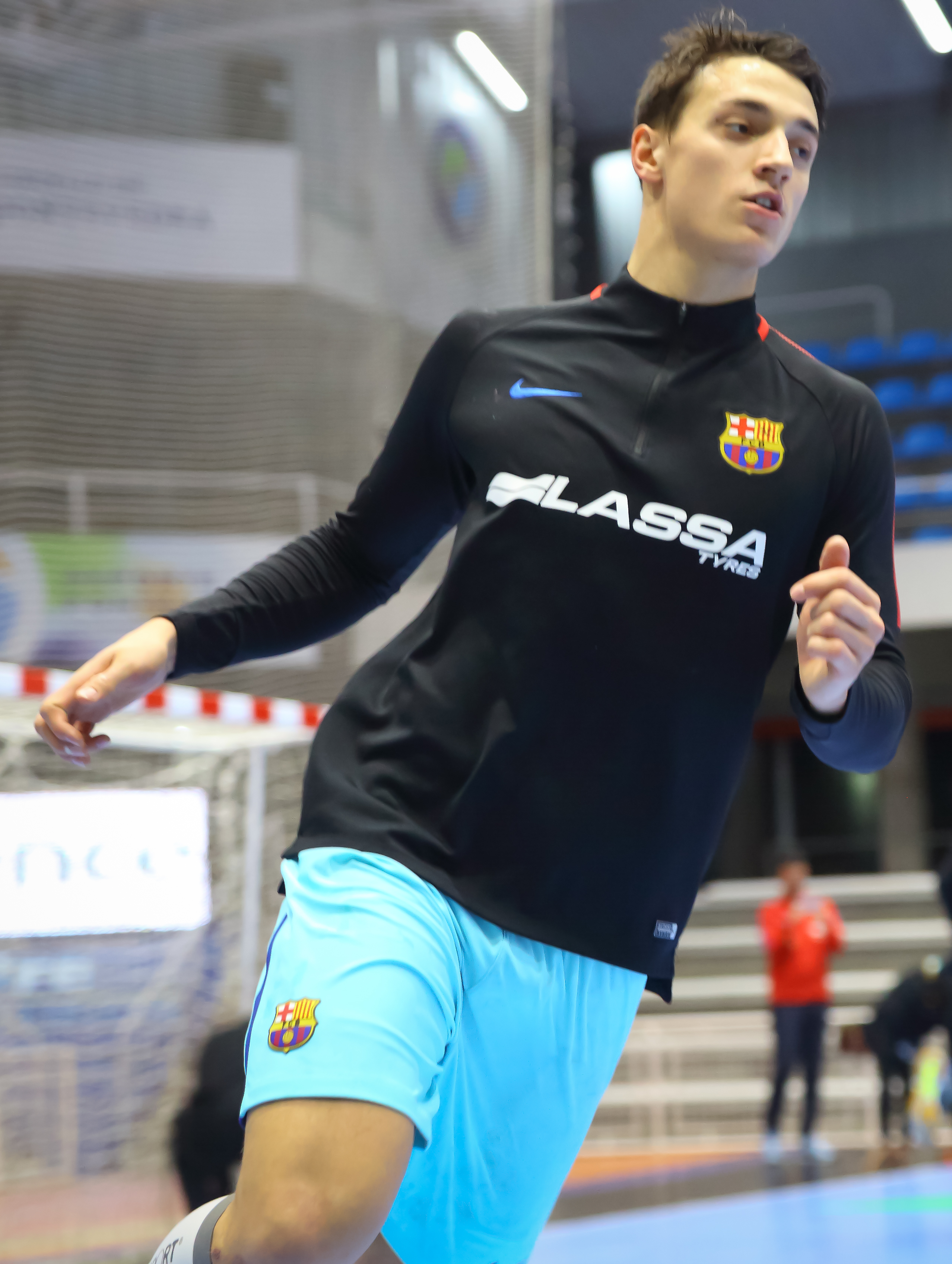
- Yanis Lenne in 2017

Personal information
- Nationality: French
- Born: 29 June 1996 (age 30) Colmar, France
- Height: 1.87 m (6 ft 2 in)

Sport
- Sport: Handball
- Position: Right Wing
- Current club: Montpellier Handball
- Number: 32

Senior clubs
- Years: Team
- 2015–2017: Sélestat AHB
- 2017–2019: FC Barcelona Lassa
- 2018–2019: → Pays d'Aix UCH (loan)
- 2019–2025: Montpellier Handball
- 2025–: ONE Veszprém
National team
Years	Team	Apps	(Gls)
2016–	France	64	(126)
Medal record
World Championship
Silver medal – second place	2023 Poland/Sweden
European Championship
Gold medal – first place	2024 Germany
- Updated on 14 January 2026

Yanis Lenne (born 29 June 1996) is a French handball player for Montpellier Handball and the French national handball team.

He is the older brother of fellow Montpellier player Arthur Lenne.

== Career ==
Yanis Lenne started playing handball at Sélestat AHB. In the 2014-15 season he made his senior debut for the club in the Ligue Nationale de Handball, but was relegated in his first season. A year later he was however promoted.

He then joined FC Barcelona for a transfer fee of 50,000 euroes on a four year deal. Here he won the 2017-18 Liga ASOBAL, Copa ASOBAL, Copa del Rey, Supercopa ASOBAL and the IHF Super Globe.

In the 2018-19 season he returned to France and joined Pays d'Aix UCH on loan. In 2019 he joined Montpellier Handball on a four year deal. Later he extended his contract until 2024. With Montpellier he reached the final of the Coupe de France in 2021, but lost to Paris Saint-Germain 26:30.

For the 2025-26 season he will join Hungarian KC Veszprém.

=== National team ===
With the French youth national teams Lenne won gold at the 2014 U18 European Championship, 2015 U19 World Championship, bronze at the 2016 U20 European Championship and the 2017 U21 World Championship.

He made his debut for the French senior national team on 3 November 2016 in a 37-20 win over Lithuania.

He participated in the 2021 World Championship, where France finished 4th.

At the 2002 European Championship he once again finished fourth, scoring 19 goals in 9 games in the process.

At the 2023 World Championship he won silver medals with the French team.

A year later he won the 2024 European Championship. He played 7 games, scoring 14 goals.
