= Patrice Canayer =

French handball player and coach (born 1961)

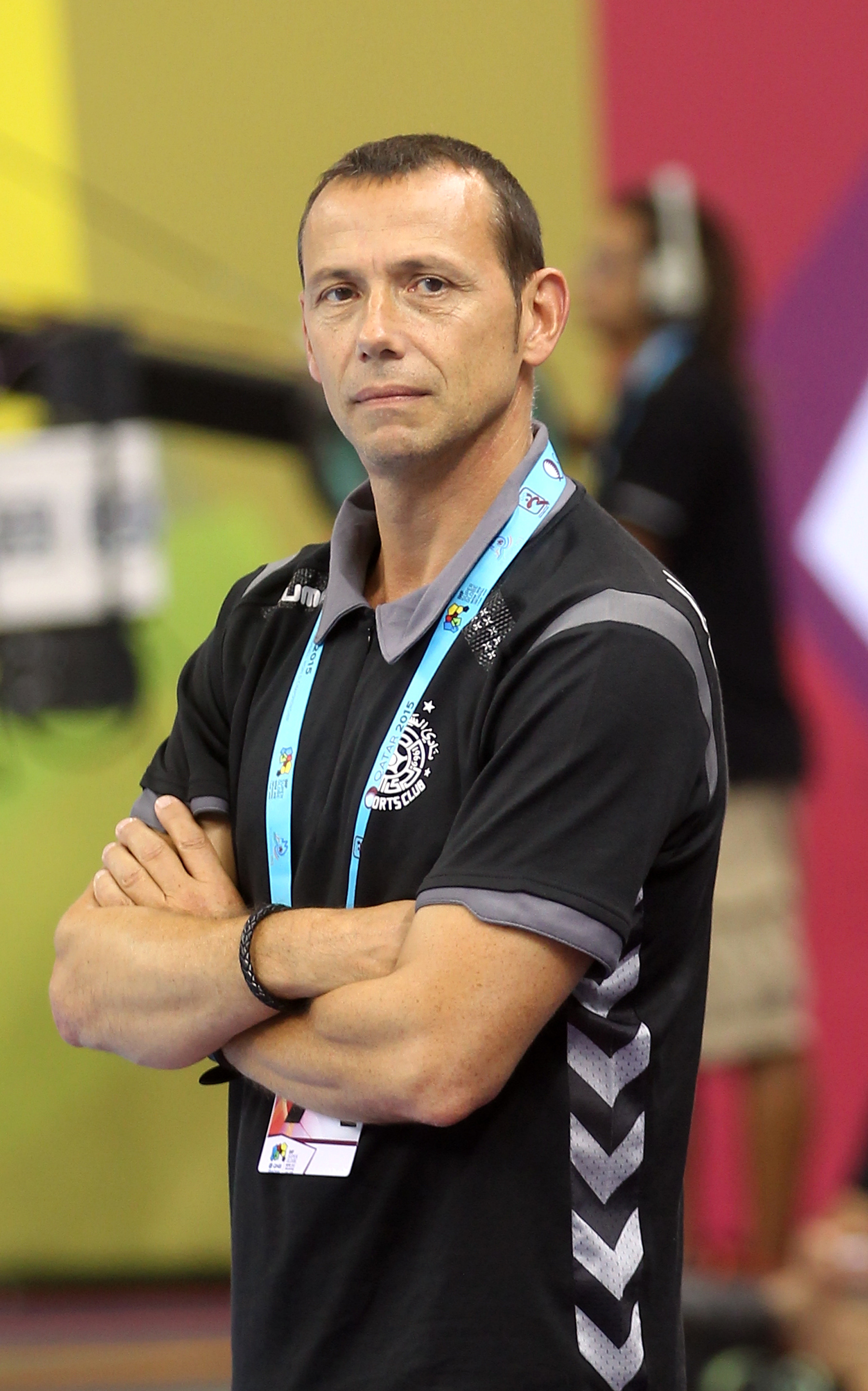
- Patrice Canayer, 2012.

Personal information
- Nationality: French
- Born: 4 April 1961 (age 65) Nîmes, France

Sport
- Sport: Handball
- Position: Pivot

Senior clubs
- Years: Team
- 1982–1985: Stade Pessacais UC (SPUC)
- 1985–1990: Paris-Asnières

Teams managed
- 1988–1994: Paris-Asnières
- 1994–2024: Montpellier Handball

Patrice Canayer (born 4 April 1961) is a French handball coach and former player. He was a player-coach for 6 years in Paris-Asnières. He was the head coach of Montpellier Handball from 1994 to 2024.

== Achievements ==
=== As coach ===
- EHF Champions League: (2) 2003, 2018
- LNH Division 1: (14) 1995, 1998, 1999, 2000, 2002, 2003, 2004, 2005, 2006, 2008, 2009, 2010, 2011, 2012
- Coupe de France: (13) 1999, 2000, 2001, 2002, 2003, 2005, 2006, 2008, 2009, 2010, 2012, 2013, 2016
- Coupe de la Ligue: (10) 2004, 2005, 2006, 2007, 2008, 2010, 2011, 2012, 2014, 2016

=== Individual awards ===
- All-Star Team as Best Coach in EHF Champions League: 2018
- Voted Best Coach in LNH Division 1: 2002, 2003, 2006, 2008, 2010, 2012, 2015, 2018
