= Montpellier Handball =

French handball club

- Full name: Montpellier Handball
- Short name: MHB
- Founded: 1982; 44 years ago
- Arena: FDI Stadium & Sud de France Arena
- Capacity: 3,000 - 9,000
- President: Julien Deljarry
- Head coach: Érick Mathé
- League: LNH Division 1
- 2024–25: LNH Division 1, 3rd of 16
- Club colours
Home	Away

Montpellier Handball, formerly named Montpellier Agglomération Handball, is a professional handball club from Montpellier, France. Montpellier is the only French club to ever have won the EHF Champions League.

Location of Montpellier Handball

== History ==
The team was founded as Cosmos Montpellier in 1982. In 1992 they were promoted to the top division. From 1994 they were coached by Patrice Canayer who guided them to 4 French championships.

In 2003 they became the first French team to win the EHF Champions League, when they beat Spanish Portland San Antonio in the final 19-27 away and 31-19 at home.

In September 2012 18 people with connections to Montpellier, including 9 players, were accused of match fixing during a match against Cesson. The accusion was that they had lost a match on purpose, in which their relatives had put money on the result worth upwards of 89,000 euros. As a result several players left the club, including Luka and Nikola Karabatić (to Pays d'Aix UC HB), Erlend Mamelund (to Haslum HK) and Primož Prošt (to Frisch Auf Göppingen). Three years later Nikola Karabatić were found guilty and had to pay a fine of 10,000 euros.

After the 2023-24 season Patrice Canayer left the club after 30 years in charge. He was replaced by Érick Mathé, who had been the assistant for Canayer from 2015 to 2018.

== Crest, colours, supporters ==
=== Naming history ===
Name	Period
Cosmos Montpellier	1982–1987
Montpellier Paillade SC	1987–1989
Montpellier Handball	1989–2007
Montpellier Agglomération Handball	2007–2015
Montpellier Handball	2015–present

=== Kits ===
HOME
2020-21	2021-22	2023-24

AWAY
2012–13	2013–14	2020-21	2021-22	2023-24

== Accomplishments ==
- LNH Division 1: (14)
  - Champions: 1994–95, 1997–98, 1998–99, 1999–00, 2001–02, 2002–03, 2003–04, 2004–05, 2005–06, 2007–08, 2008–09, 2009–10, 2010–11, 2011–12
- EHF Champions League: (2)
  - Champions: 2002–03, 2017–18
- Coupe de France: (15)
  - Champions: 1998–99, 1999–2000, 2000–01, 2001–02, 2002–03, 2004–05, 2005–06, 2007–08, 2008–09, 2009–10, 2011–12, 2012–13, 2015–16, 2024–25, 2025–26
- Coupe de la Ligue: (10)
  - Champions: 2003–04, 2004–05, 2005–06, 2006–07, 2007–08, 2009–10, 2010–11, 2011–12, 2013–14, 2015–16
- Trophée des Champions: (3)
  - Champions: 2010, 2011, 2018
- Championnat de France N1B
  - First place: 1991–92
- Championnat de France Nationale 2
  - First place: 1988–89, 1999–00 (rés.)
- Championnat de France Nationale 3
  - First place: 1987–88
- Double

Winners (10): 1998–99, 1999–00, 2001–02, 2002–03, 2004–04, 2005–06, 2007–08, 2008–09, 2009–10, 2011–12

- Triple Crown

Winners (1): 2002–03

== European record ==
Season	Competition	Round	Club	1st leg	2nd leg	Aggregate
2016–17	EHF Champions League	Group Stage	(Spain) Logroño	30–31	37–27	1st place
2016–17	EHF Champions League	Group Stage	(Norway) Elverum Håndball	31–24	31–32	1st place
2016–17	EHF Champions League	Group Stage	(North Macedonia) Metalurg Skopje	28–18	30–24	1st place
2016–17	EHF Champions League	Group Stage	(Slovakia) HT Tatran Prešov	28–23	28–24	1st place
2016–17	EHF Champions League	Group Stage	(Russia) Chekhovskiye Medvedi	26–22	33–27	1st place
2016–17	EHF Champions League	PO	(Ukraine) HC Motor Zaporizhzhia	36–34	29–29	65–63
2016–17	EHF Champions League	1/8	(Poland) Vive Tauron Kielce	33–28	28–26	61–54
2016–17	EHF Champions League	1/4	(Hungary) MVM Veszprém	23–26	25–30	48–56
2017–18	EHF Champions League	Group Stage	(North Macedonia) Metalurg Skopje	32–22	27–21	1st place
2017–18	EHF Champions League	Group Stage	(Russia) Chekhovskiye Medvedi	28–24	34–23	1st place
2017–18	EHF Champions League	Group Stage	(Ukraine) HC Motor Zaporizhzhia	28–20	30–31	1st place
2017–18	EHF Champions League	Group Stage	(Turkey) Beşiktaş	36–32	28–33	1st place
2017–18	EHF Champions League	Group Stage	(Portugal) Sporting CP	33–29	33–32	1st place
2017–18	EHF Champions League	Playoffs	(Spain) CB Ademar León	28–24	20–19	48–43
2017–18	EHF Champions League	Round of 16	(Spain) Barça	28–25	28–30	56–55
2017–18	EHF Champions League	Quarterfinals	(Germany) SG Flensburg-Handewitt	28–28	29–17	57–45
2017–18	EHF Champions League	Semifinal	(North Macedonia) Vardar	28–27		
2017–18	EHF Champions League	Final	(France) HBC Nantes	32–26		
2018–19	EHF Champions League	Group Stage	(North Macedonia) Vardar	24–27	27–33	7th place
2018–19	EHF Champions League	Group Stage	(Belarus) Meshkov Brest	23–26	29–23	7th place
2018–19	EHF Champions League	Group Stage	(Poland) PGE Vive Kielce	26–29	28–27	7th place
2018–19	EHF Champions League	Group Stage	(Spain) Barça	27–35	28–36	7th place
2018–19	EHF Champions League	Group Stage	(Hungary) Telekom Veszprém	29–30	19–25	7th place
2018–19	EHF Champions League	Group Stage	(Sweden) IFK Kristianstad	29–29	30–31	7th place
2018–19	EHF Champions League	Group Stage	(Germany) Rhein-Neckar Löwen	27–37	31–26	7th place
2019–20	EHF Champions League	Group Stage	(Germany) THW Kiel	30–33	32–33	4th place
2019–20	EHF Champions League	Group Stage	(Hungary) Telekom Veszprém	23–18	23–24	4th place
2019–20	EHF Champions League	Group Stage	(Poland) PGE Vive Kielce	25–24	29–27	4th place
2019–20	EHF Champions League	Group Stage	(Portugal) Porto Sofarma	22–27	23–23	4th place
2019–20	EHF Champions League	Group Stage	(North Macedonia) Vardar	31–33	31–27	4th place
2019–20	EHF Champions League	Group Stage	(Belarus) Meshkov Brest	30–26	27–25	4th place
2019–20	EHF Champions League	Group Stage	(Ukraine) Motor Zaporizhzhia	34–30	26–25	4th place
2019–20	EHF Champions League	Round of 16	(Germany) Flensburg	Cancelled		
2020–21	EHF European League	2QR	(Denmark) Skjern Håndbold	30–31	33–29	63–60
2020–21	EHF European League	Group Stage	(Russia) HC CSKA	0–10	10–0	3rd place
2020–21	EHF European League	Group Stage	(Germany) SC Magdeburg	30–32	0–10	3rd place
2020–21	EHF European League	Group Stage	(Croatia) RK Nexe	37–25	23–22	3rd place
2020–21	EHF European League	Group Stage	(Turkey) Besiktas Aygaz	40–16	26–36	3rd place
2020–21	EHF European League	Group Stage	(Sweden) Alingsås HK	32–21	33–25	3rd place
2020–21	EHF European League	L16	(Switzerland) Kadetten Schaffhausen	27–27	32–25	59–52
2020–21	EHF European League	Quarterfinals	(Germany) Füchse Berlin	32–29	23–31	55–60
2021–22	EHF Champions League	Group Stage	(Hungary) Pick Szeged	29–29	29–29	4th place
2021–22	EHF Champions League	Group Stage	(Denmark) Aalborg Håndbold	28–36	31–33	4th place
2021–22	EHF Champions League	Group Stage	(Germany) THW Kiel	37–30	26–35	4th place
2021–22	EHF Champions League	Group Stage	(North Macedonia) RK Vardar	31–25	25–28	4th place
2021–22	EHF Champions League	Group Stage	(Belarus) Meshkov Brest	32–26	31–31	4th place
2021–22	EHF Champions League	Group Stage	(Croatia) PPD Zagreb	25–22	24–23	4th place
2021–22	EHF Champions League	Group Stage	(Norway) Elverum Håndball	37–30	39–32	4th place
2021–22	EHF Champions League	Playoffs	(Portugal) FC Porto	29–29	35–27	64–56
2021–22	EHF Champions League	Quarterfinals	(Poland) Łomża Vive Kielce	28–31	22–30	50–61
2022–23	EHF European League	2QR	(Sweden) IK Sävehof	24–24	30–26	54–50
2022–23	EHF European League	Group Stage	(Switzerland) Kadetten Schaffhausen	40–36	30–28	1st place
2022–23	EHF European League	Group Stage	(Slovenia) Tatran Prešov	41–30	27–35	1st place
2022–23	EHF European League	Group Stage	(Germany) Frisch Auf Göppingen	35–27	25–27	1st place
2022–23	EHF European League	Group Stage	(Hungary) Fejér B.Á.L. Veszprém	34–30	39–31	1st place
2022–23	EHF European League	Group Stage	(Portugal) SL Benfica	33–27	26–24	1st place
2022–23	EHF European League	L16	(Hungary) FTC	36–30	43–29	79–59
2022–23	EHF European League	Quarterfinals	(Portugal) Sporting CP	32–32	31–30	63–62
2022–23	EHF European League	Semifinals	(Germany) Füchse Berlin	29–35		
2022–23	EHF European League	Third place game	(Germany) Frisch Auf Göppingen	29–33		
2023–24	EHF Champions League	Group Stage	(Spain) Barça	25–30	37–34	4th place
2023–24	EHF Champions League	Group Stage	(Hungary) Telekom Veszprém	31–37	31–33	4th place
2023–24	EHF Champions League	Group Stage	(Poland) Orlen Wisła Płock	30–28	18–22	4th place
2023–24	EHF Champions League	Group Stage	(Slovenia) Celje Pivovarna Laško	32–21	31–29	4th place
2023–24	EHF Champions League	Group Stage	(Denmark) GOG Håndbold	36–25	27–32	4th place
2023–24	EHF Champions League	Group Stage	(Germany) SC Magdeburg	25–28	24–28	4th place
2023–24	EHF Champions League	Group Stage	(Portugal) FC Porto	35–24	29–25	4th place
2023–24	EHF Champions League	Playoffs	(Croatia) RK Zagreb	27–27	30–24	57–51
2023–24	EHF Champions League	Quarterfinals	(Germany) THW Kiel	39–30	21–31	60–61
2024–25	EHF European League	Group Stage	(Denmark) Bjerringbro-Silkeborg	40–26	34–22	1st place
2024–25	EHF European League	Group Stage	(Spain) Fraikin BM Granollers	34–25	28–24	1st place
2024–25	EHF European League	Group Stage	(Poland) Górnik Zabrze	30–25	27–23	1st place
2024–25	EHF European League	Main round	(Switzerland) HC Kriens-Luzern	31–27	32–31	1st place
2024–25	EHF European League	Main round	(Denmark) GOG Håndbold	30–28	27–33	1st place
2024–25	EHF European League	Quarterfinals	(Portugal) FC Porto	30–29	35–32	65–61
2024–25	EHF European League	Semifinals	(Germany) THW Kiel	32–31		
2024–25	EHF European League	Final	(Germany) SG Flensburg-Handewitt	25–32		
2025–26	EHF European League	Group Stage	(Germany) THW Kiel	28–30	18–27	2nd place
2025–26	EHF European League	Group Stage	(Switzerland) BSV Bern	37–28	37–31	2nd place
2025–26	EHF European League	Group Stage	(Poland) KPR Ostrovia	37–26	38–25	2nd place
2025–26	EHF European League	Main round	(Spain) Irudek Bidasoa Irún	38–33	36–34	3rd place
2025–26	EHF European League	Main round	(Germany) SG Flensburg-Handewitt	35–32	35–40	3rd place
2025–26	EHF European League	Play-offs	(Norway) Elverum Håndball	36–24	31–35	67–59
2025–26	EHF European League	Quarterfinals	(North Macedonia) HC Vardar 1961	33–23	24–27	57–50
2025–26	EHF European League	Semifinals	(Germany) THW Kiel	28–29		
2025–26	EHF European League	Third place game	(Germany) SG Flensburg-Handewitt	30–32		
2026–27	EHF Champions League	Group Stage	(Romania) CS Dinamo București	27–23	26–36	4th place
2026–27	EHF Champions League	Group Stage	(Spain) Barça	27–28	34–40	4th place
2026–27	EHF Champions League	Group Stage	(Denmark) SAH Aarhus	32–36	30–38	4th place
2026–27	EHF European League	Play-offs	(To be determined) TBD	–	–	–

== Team ==
=== Current squad ===
Squad for the 2025–26 season

Goalkeepers

- 12 (France) Charles Bolzinger
- 92 (France) Rémi Desbonnet

Left Wingers

- 10 (Sweden) Lucas Pellas
- 90 (France) Léo Plantin

Right Wingers

- 22 (France) Benjamin Richert
- 34 (Spain) David Balaguer

Line players

- 13 (Brazil) Rogério Moraes Ferreira
- 19 (France) Arthur Lenne
- 27 (France) Matéo Caille

Left Backs

- 11 (Croatia) Zvonimir Srna
- 26 (Brazil) Bryan Monte
- 93 (France) Kylian Prat

Central Backs

- 4 (Argentina) Diego Simonet
- 5 (France) Kyllian Villeminot
- 18 (Spain) Agustín Casado

Right Backs

- 15 (Sweden) Jack Thurin
- 25 (France) Lucas Guigon
- 28 (France) Valentin Porte (c)

=== Transfers ===
Transfers for the 2026–27 season

Joining

- (Spain) Pol Valera (CB) from (Portugal) FC Porto
- (France) Drevy Paschal (LW) from (France) Saint-Raphaël Var Handball
- (France) Hugo Pimenta (RB) from (France) Chambéry SMBH

Leaving

- (Argentina) Diego Simonet (CB) to (Argentina) SAG Ballester
- (Sweden) Lucas Pellas (LW) to (Denmark) GOG Håndbold
- (France) Kylian Prat (LB) to (France) Tremblay Handball

=== Transfer History ===
Transfers for the 2025–26 season

Joining

- (France) Léo Plantin (LW) (from (France) Paris Saint-Germain)
- (Croatia) Zvonimir Srna (LB) (from (Croatia) RK Zagreb)
- (Spain) Agustín Casado (CB) (from (Hungary) ONE Veszprém)
- (Sweden) Jack Thurin (RB) (from (Denmark) Aalborg Håndbold)
- (Spain) David Balaguer (RW) (from (France) Paris Saint-Germain)
- (Brazil) Rogério Moraes Ferreira (P) (from (Germany) MT Melsungen)

Leaving

- (Spain) Djordje Cikusa (RB) loan back to (Spain) FC Barcelona
- (Iceland) Dagur Gautason (LW) to (Norway) ØIF Arendal
- (Spain) Jaime Fernández (LW) (to Club Balonmano Burgos)
- (Egypt) Ahmed Hesham (LB) (to (Hungary) ONE Veszprém)
- (Slovenia) Staš Skube (CB) (to (Slovenia) RD LL Grosist Slovan)
- (Norway) Sindre Aho (CB) (to (Germany) TSV Hannover-Burgdorf)
- (Sweden) Sebastian Karlsson (RW) (to (France) Paris Saint-Germain)
- (France) Yanis Lenne (RW) (to (Hungary) ONE Veszprém)
- (France) Karl Konan (P) (to (France) Paris Saint-Germain)
- (Croatia) Veron Načinović (P) (to (Germany) THW Kiel)

== Former club members ==
=== Notable former players ===
- (France) Joël Abati (2007–2009)
- (France) William Accambray (2005–2014)
- (France) Benjamin Afgour (2017–2020)
- (France) Igor Anić (2003–2007)
- (France) Grégory Anquetil (1989–2007)
- (France) Arnaud Bingo (2016–2019)
- (France) Sébastien Bosquet (2003–2005)
- (France) Cédric Burdet (1995–2003, 2006–2009)
- (France) Laurent Busselier (1996–2000)
- (France) Patrick Cazal (1994–1999)
- (France) Hugo Descat (2019–2023)
- (France) Didier Dinart (1996–2003)
- (France) Adrien Dipanda (2006–2011)
- (France) Frédéric Dole (2004–2007)
- (France) Ludovic Fabregas (2011–2018)
- (France) Jérôme Fernandez (1999–2002)
- (France) Vincent Gérard (2006–2008, 2015–2019)
- (France) (Socialist Federal Republic of Yugoslavia) Andrej Golić (1992–2006)
- (France) Mathieu Grébille (2008–2020)
- (France) Michaël Guigou (1999–2019)
- (France) Samuel Honrubia (2001–2012)
- (France) François-Xavier Houlet (1994–1996)
- (France) Franck Junillon (1987–2008)
- (France) Luka Karabatic (2007–2012)
- (France) Nikola Karabatić (2000–2005, 2009–2013)
- (France) Daouda Karaboué (1993–2000, 2004–2010)
- (France) Karl Konan (2022–2025)
- (France) Geoffroy Krantz (2000–2007)
- (France) Yanis Lenne (2019–2025)
- (France) Pascal Mahé (1992–1996)
- (France) Bruno Martini (2000–2003)
- (France) Olivier Maurelli (1995–1996)
- (France) Philippe Médard (1987–1989)
- (France) Thierry Omeyer (2000–2006, 2013–2014)
- (France) Valentin Porte (2016–)
- (France) Laurent Puigségur (1990–2006)
- (France) Melvyn Richardson (2017–2021)
- (France) Mickaël Robin (2010–2014)
- (France) Arnaud Siffert (2013–2016)
- (France) Stéphane Stoecklin (1988–1990)
- (France) Marc Wiltberger (1993–1996)
- (France) Semir Zuzo (2003–2006)
- (Algeria) Abdelkrim Bendjemil (1990–1992)
- (Algeria) Rabah Gherbi (1996–1999, 2001–2003)
- (Argentina) Lucas Moscariello (2021–2023)
- (Argentina) Diego Simonet (2013–)
- (Bosnia and Herzegovina) Marko Panić (2021–2024)
- (Brazil) Felipe Borges (2013–2016)
- (Czech Republic) David Juříček (2004–2011)
- (Czech Republic) Jan Sobol (2007–2010)
- (Croatia) Venio Losert (2014–2015)
- (Croatia) Petar Metličić (2012–2013)
- (Croatia) Veron Načinović (2021–2025)
- (Croatia) Marin Šego (2019–2022)
- (Democratic Republic of the Congo) Damien Kabengele (1996–2006)
- (Egypt) Ahmed Hesham (2023–2025)
- (Egypt) Mohamed Mamdouh (2017–2019)
- (Spain) Cristian Malmagro (2012–2013)
- (Hungary) Balázs Laluska (2014–2015)
- (Hungary) (Serbia) Uroš Vilovski (2012–2013)
- (Iran) Allahkaram Esteki (2015–2016)
- (Iceland) Ólafur Guðmundsson (2021–2022)
- (Iceland) Geir Sveinsson (1995–1997)
- (Lithuania) Jonas Truchanovičius (2016–2021)
- (Norway) Erlend Mamelund (2012–2013)
- (Portugal) Alexis Borges (2020–2021)
- (Portugal) Gilberto Duarte (2019–2022)
- (Romania) Ion Mocanu (1994–1995)
- (Romania) Sorin Toacsen (1996–2000, 2003–2004)
- (Russia) Igor Chumak (1992–1996)
- (Slovenia) Jure Dolenec (2013–2017)
- (Slovenia) Matej Gaber (2013–2016)
- (Slovenia) Dragan Gajić (2011–2016)
- (Slovenia) Vid Kavtičnik (2009–2019)
- (Slovenia) Borut Mačkovšek (2014–2015)
- (Slovenia) Primož Prošt (2011–2012)
- (Slovenia) Staš Skube (2022–2025)
- (Slovenia) Miha Žvižej (2016–2017)
- (Serbia) Mladen Bojinović (2002–2012)
- (Serbia) Mitar Markez (2010–2011)
- (Serbia) Rastko Stefanovič (2002–2004)
- (Serbia) Nebojša Stojinović (2008–2010)
- (Switzerland) Nikola Portner (2016–2020)
- (Slovakia) Richard Štochl (2010–2012)
- (Sweden) Martin Frändesjö (2000–2001)
- (Sweden) Lucas Pellas (2020–)
- (Sweden) Fredric Pettersson (2018–2021)
- (Sweden) Karl Wallinius (2021–2022)
- (Tunisia) Aymen Hammed (2009–2011)
- (Tunisia) Wissem Hmam (2005–2014)
- (Tunisia) Marouen Maggaiz (2006–2008)
- (Tunisia) Heykel Megannem (2007–2009)
- (Tunisia) Sobhi Sioud (2001–2007)
- (Tunisia) Mohamed Soussi (2017–2020)
- (Tunisia) Issam Tej (2006–2015)
- (Tunisia) Aymen Toumi (2015–2018)

=== Former coaches ===
Seasons	Coach	Country
–1991	Lucien Courdesse	(France)
1991-1994	Guy Petitgirard	(France)
1994–2024	Patrice Canayer	(France)
2024–	Érick Mathé	(France)
