= Thierry Omeyer =

French handball player (born 1976)

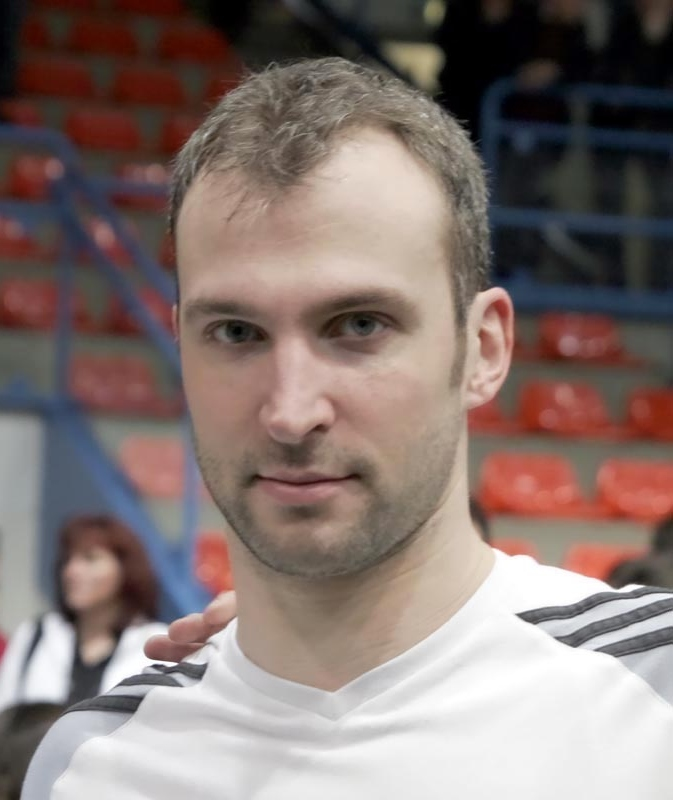
- In 2006

Personal information
- Nationality: French
- Born: 2 November 1976 (age 49) Mulhouse, France
- Height: 1.92 m (6 ft 4 in)

Sport
- Sport: Handball
- Position: Goalkeeper

Youth career
- Years: Team
- 1985–1994: Cernay

Senior clubs
- Years: Team
- 1994–2000: Sélestat HB
- 2000–2006: Montpellier Handball
- 2006–2013: THW Kiel
- 2013–2014: Montpellier Handball
- 2014–2019: PSG Handball
National team
Years	Team	Apps	(Gls)
1999–2017	France	356	(4)
Medal record
Men's handball
Representing France
Olympic Games
Gold medal – first place	2008 Beijing	Team
Gold medal – first place	2012 London	Team
Silver medal – second place	2016 Rio de Janeiro	Team
World Championship
Gold medal – first place	2001 France
Gold medal – first place	2009 Croatia
Gold medal – first place	2011 Sweden
Gold medal – first place	2015 Qatar
Gold medal – first place	2017 France
Bronze medal – third place	2003 Portugal
Bronze medal – third place	2005 Tunisia
European Championship
Gold medal – first place	2006 Switzerland
Gold medal – first place	2010 Austria
Gold medal – first place	2014 Denmark
Bronze medal – third place	2008 Norway
Mediterranean Games
Bronze medal – third place	2001 Tunis	Team

Thierry Omeyer (born 2 November 1976) is a retired French handball goalkeeper.

A member of the French national team since 1999, he has won all major titles with the team: world champion (five times), European champion (three times) and Olympic champion twice.

He is widely considered to be one of the best handball goalkeepers of all time, and was the third goalkeeper so far to have been elected best player of the world by the International Handball Federation (the two others being Henning Fritz, in 2004, and Árpád Sterbik, in 2005, since Niklas Landin in 2021), what he achieved in 2008. In his former club (THW Kiel), his nickname was Die Mauer (The Wall).

He was included in the European Handball Federation Hall of Fame in 2023.

== Club career ==
Omeyer started handball at the age of 9 in Cernay (Alsace). In 1994, he joined his first professional club, Sélestat. His save percentage being up to 50%, he caught the attention of the best club in the French championship, Montpellier. Quickly becoming the first choice goalkeeper, he won five championships (from 2002 to 2006) and five national cups (2001, 2002, 2003, 2005 and 2006). The biggest highlight of his time there is the win of the 2003 EHF Champions League, a title that had never been won by a French club before.

In 2006, he decided to leave for a more competitive championship and joined the German club THW Kiel, with whom he won the double, the championship and the national cup in 2007 and 2008, plus the Champions League in 2007, 2010 and 2012.

On 15 April 2014, Paris Saint-Germain announced that both Thierry Omeyer and William Accambray were leaving Montpellier in order to join their club next season.

Omeyer played his last professional match on 6 June 2019 against Cesson-Rennes, PSG, who had already secured the title, defeated Cesson-Rennes 29-20, which ensured the latter's relegation.

== International career ==
He made his debut for the French national team on September 19, 1999 against Romania. In 2001, he became World champion after beating Sweden 28-25 (after two extra-times) in the final.

In 2008, he became Olympic champion after an excellent tournament where he was voted best goalkeeper with a rate of 41% shots saved all over the competition. In the final, he saved 19 shots out of 39 to ensure France' 28-23 win over Iceland.

In 2015, he became World champion after beating Qatar 25-22. He was voted best goalkeeper and the MVP of the tournament.

== Individual awards ==
- Most Valuable Player (MVP) of the World Championship: 2015
- All-Star Goalkeeper of the World Championship: 2011, 2015
- All-Star Goalkeeper of the European Championship: 2006
- IHF World Player of the Year: 2008
- EHF Hall of Fame: 2023
