= Charles Bolzinger =

French handball player (born 2000)

Personal information
- Nationality: French
- Born: 14 December 2000 (age 25) Sète, France
- Height: 1.98 m (6 ft 6 in)

Sport
- Sport: Handball
- Position: Goalkeeper
- Current club: Montpellier Handball
- Number: 12

Youth career
- Years: Team
- –: Frontignan
- –2021: Montpellier Handball

Senior clubs
- Years: Team
- 2021–: Montpellier Handball
National team
Years	Team	Apps	(Gls)
2022–	France	26	(1)
Medal record
World Championship
Silver medal – second place	2023 Poland/Sweden
Bronze medal – third place	2025 Croatia/Denmark/Norway
European Championship
Gold medal – first place	2024 Germany
- Updated on 7 January 2026

Charles Bolzinger (born 14 December 2000) is a French handball player for Montpellier Handball and the French national team.

In 2025 he was part of the French team that won bronze medals of the World Championship. They lost the semifinals to Croatia, but won the third place playoff against Portugal. With seconds remaining he made a crucial safe to keep the score 35:34, that won the match for France.

== Individual awards ==
- All-Star goalkeeper of LNH Division 1: 2022–23
