= 2017–18 EHF Champions League =

European handball competition

EHF Champions League
- 2017–18

Tournament information
- Sport: Handball
- Location: Lanxess Arena (FINAL4)
- Dates: 2 September 2017–27 May 2018
- Teams: 28 (group stage); 31 (qualification)
- Website: ehfcl.com

Final positions
- Champions: (France) Montpellier
- Runner-up: (France) HBC Nantes

Tournament statistics
- Matches played: 200
- Goals scored: 11263 (56.32 per match)
- Attendance: 857,713 (4,289 per match)
- Top scorer(s): (Germany) Uwe Gensheimer (92 goals)

The 2017–18 EHF Champions League was the 58th edition of Europe's premier club handball tournament and the 25th edition under the current EHF Champions League format.

Montpellier defeated HBC Nantes in the final to win their second title.

== Competition format ==
Group Stage

Twenty-eight teams participated in the competition, divided in four groups. Groups A and B were played with eight teams each, in a round robin, home and away format. The top team in each group qualified directly for the quarter-finals, the bottom two in each group dropped out of the competition and the remaining 10 teams qualified for the first knock-out phase.

In groups C and D, six teams played in each group in a round robin format, playing both home and away. The top two teams in each group then met in a ‘semi-final’ play-off, with the two winners going through to the first knock-out phase. The remaining teams dropped out of the competition.

Knock-out Phase 1 (Last 16)

12 teams played home and away in the first knock-out phase, with the 10 teams qualified from groups A and B and the two teams qualified from groups C and D.

Knock-out Phase 2 (Quarterfinals)

The six winners of the matches in the first knock-out phase joined the winners of groups A and B to play home and away for the right to play in the VELUX EHF FINAL4.

Final four

The culmination of the season, the VELUX EHF FINAL4, will continue in its existing format, with the four top teams from the competition competing for the title.

== Team allocation ==
28 teams were directly qualified for the group stage.

Groups A/B
| (Belarus) Meshkov Brest | (Croatia) Zagreb | (Denmark) Aalborg Håndbold | (France) HBC Nantes |
| (France) Paris Saint-Germain | (Germany) Flensburg-Handewitt | (Germany) THW Kiel | (Germany) Rhein-Neckar Löwen |
| (Hungary) MOL-Pick Szeged | (Hungary) Telekom Veszprém | (North Macedonia) Vardar | (Poland) PGE Vive Kielce |
| (Poland) Wisła Płock | (Slovenia) Celje | (Spain) Barcelona Lassa | (Sweden) IFK Kristianstad |
Groups C/D
| (Denmark) Skjern Håndbold | (France) Montpellier Handball | (North Macedonia) Metalurg Skopje | (Norway) Elverum Håndball |
| (Romania) Dinamo București | (Russia) Chekhovskiye Medvedi | (Slovenia) RK Gorenje Velenje | (Spain) CB Ademar León |
| (Switzerland) Kadetten Schaffhausen | (Turkey) Beşiktaş | (Ukraine) Motor Zaporizhzhia | Qualifier |
Qualification tournament
| (Austria) Alpla HC Hard | (Finland) Riihimäki Cocks | (Portugal) Sporting CP | (Slovakia) Tatran Prešov |

== Round and draw dates ==
The qualification draw was held in Vienna, Austria and the group stage draw in Ljubljana, Slovenia.

| Phase | Draw date |
|---|---|
| Qualification tournaments | 29 June 2017 |
| Group stage | 30 June 2017 |
| Knockout stage | 30 June 2017 |
| Final Four (Cologne) | 2 May 2018 |

== Qualification stage ==
The four teams played a semifinal and final to determine the last participant. Matches were played on 2 and 3 September 2017.

Tatran Prešov hosted the tournament.

=== Bracket ===
Semifinals
2 September
(Portugal) Sporting CP | 31
(Finland) Riihimäki Cocks | 27
2 September
(Slovakia) Tatran Prešov | 25
(Austria) Alpla HC Hard | 26

Final
3 September
(Portugal) Sporting CP (OT) | 35
(Austria) Alpla HC Hard | 34
Third place
3 September
(Finland) Riihimäki Cocks | 27
(Slovakia) Tatran Prešov | 30

=== Semifinals ===
| 2 September 2017; 13:30 | Sporting CP (Portugal) | 31–27 | (Finland) Riihimäki Cocks | Tatran Handball Arena, Prešov; Attendance: 420; Referees: Jurinović, Mrvica (CRO) |
| 2 September 2017; 13:30 | Carol 8 | (18–14) | Rönnberg 9 | Tatran Handball Arena, Prešov; Attendance: 420; Referees: Jurinović, Mrvica (CRO) |
| 2 September 2017; 13:30 | 3× (yellow card) 3× (suspension) | Report | 3× (yellow card) 1× (suspension) | Tatran Handball Arena, Prešov; Attendance: 420; Referees: Jurinović, Mrvica (CRO) |

| 2 September 2017; 16:00 | Tatran Prešov (Slovakia) | 25–26 | (Austria) Alpla HC Hard | Tatran Handball Arena, Prešov; Attendance: 1,500; Referees: Herczeg, Südi (HUN) |
| 2 September 2017; 16:00 | Butorac 7 | (12–13) | Schmid 7 | Tatran Handball Arena, Prešov; Attendance: 1,500; Referees: Herczeg, Südi (HUN) |
| 2 September 2017; 16:00 | 3× (yellow card) 1× (suspension) | Report | 3× (yellow card) 4× (suspension) | Tatran Handball Arena, Prešov; Attendance: 1,500; Referees: Herczeg, Südi (HUN) |

=== Third place game ===
| 3 September 2017; 13:30 | Riihimäki Cocks (Finland) | 27–30 | (Slovakia) Tatran Prešov | Tatran Handball Arena, Prešov; Attendance: 400; Referees: Herczeg, Südi (HUN) |
| 3 September 2017; 13:30 | Rönnberg 5 | (10–15) | Krok 6 | Tatran Handball Arena, Prešov; Attendance: 400; Referees: Herczeg, Südi (HUN) |
| 3 September 2017; 13:30 | 2× (yellow card) 2× (suspension) 1× (red card) | Report | 3× (yellow card) 3× (suspension) | Tatran Handball Arena, Prešov; Attendance: 400; Referees: Herczeg, Südi (HUN) |

=== Final ===
3 September 2017
16:05
Sporting CP (Portugal)
35–34 (ET)
(Austria) Alpla HC Hard
Tatran Handball Arena, Prešov
Attendance: 500
Referees: Jurinović, Mrvica (CRO)
Carol 9
(17–17)
Schmid 10
3× (yellow card) 6× (suspension)
Report
3× (yellow card) 2× (suspension)

FT: 29–29 ET: 6–5

== Group stage ==
Location of teams of the 2016–17 EHF Champions League group stage.
Red: Group A; Blue: Group B; Green: Group C; Yellow: Group D.

The draw for the group stage was held on 30 June 2017 at 21:00 in the Ljubljana castle. The 28 teams were drawn into four groups, two containing eight teams (Groups A and B) and two containing six teams (Groups C and D). The only restriction is that teams from the same national association could not face each other in the same group. Since Germany qualified three teams, the lowest seeded side (Kiel) were drawn with one of the other two.

In each group, teams played against each other in a double round-robin format, with home and away matches.

After completion of the group stage matches, the teams advancing to the knockout stage were determined in the following manner:

- Groups A and B – the top team qualified directly for the quarterfinals, and the five teams ranked 2nd–6th advanced to the first knockout round.
- Groups C and D – the top two teams from both groups contest a playoff to determine the last two sides joining the 10 teams from Groups A and B in the first knockout round.

Tiebreakers
In the group stage, teams are ranked according to points (2 points for a win, 1 point for a draw, 0 points for a loss). After completion of the group stage, if two or more teams have scored the same number of points, the ranking will be determined as follows:
1. Highest number of points in matches between the teams directly involved;
2. Superior goal difference in matches between the teams directly involved;
3. Highest number of goals scored in matches between the teams directly involved (or in the away match in case of a two-team tie);
4. Superior goal difference in all matches of the group;
5. Highest number of plus goals in all matches of the group;

If the ranking of one of these teams is determined, the above criteria are consecutively followed until the ranking of all teams is determined. If no ranking can be determined, a decision shall be obtained by EHF through drawing of lots.

During the group stage, only criteria 4–5 apply to determine the provisional ranking of teams.

=== Group A ===
| Pos | Team | Pld | W | D | L | GF | GA | GD | Pts | Qualification | VAR | BAR | NAN | RNL | SZE | KRI | PLO | ZAG |
|---|---|---|---|---|---|---|---|---|---|---|---|---|---|---|---|---|---|---|
| 1 | (North Macedonia) Vardar | 14 | 9 | 3 | 2 | 390 | 341 | +49 | 21 | Quarterfinals | — | 27–24 | 27–23 | 30–26 | 34–30 | 31–15 | 31–31 | 28–21 |
| 2 | (Spain) Barcelona Lassa | 14 | 9 | 2 | 3 | 408 | 377 | +31 | 20 (Note: Barcelona 56–54 HBC Nantes) | First knockout round | 29–28 | — | 31–25 | 26–26 | 28–27 | 31–29 | 28–27 | 32–22 |
| 3 | (France) HBC Nantes | 14 | 9 | 2 | 3 | 402 | 382 | +20 | 20 | First knockout round | 27–26 | 29–25 | — | 26–26 | 30–26 | 34–25 | 32–30 | 28–27 |
| 4 | (Germany) Rhein-Neckar Löwen | 14 | 6 | 5 | 3 | 416 | 391 | +25 | 17 | First knockout round | 21–21 | 31–31 | 30–30 | — | 35–37 | 32–29 | 31–27 | 31–24 |
| 5 | (Hungary) MOL-Pick Szeged | 14 | 6 | 1 | 7 | 421 | 411 | +10 | 13 | First knockout round | 26–26 | 31–28 | 29–33 | 31–34 | — | 36–27 | 24–25 | 30–28 |
| 6 | (Sweden) IFK Kristianstad | 14 | 3 | 2 | 9 | 355 | 415 | −60 | 8 | First knockout round | 23–26 | 21–26 | 26–31 | 22–35 | 33–32 | — | 25–24 | 28–28 |
| 7 | (Poland) Wisła Płock | 14 | 2 | 3 | 9 | 380 | 408 | −28 | 7 | | 22–26 | 30–37 | 30–32 | 27–32 | 27–33 | 25–25 | — | 27–24 |
| 8 | (Croatia) Zagreb | 14 | 2 | 2 | 10 | 349 | 396 | −47 | 6 | | 23–29 | 24–32 | 23–22 | 30–26 | 23–28 | 24–27 | 28–28 | — |

Source: EHF
Rules for classification: See Tiebreakers

=== Group B ===
| Pos | Team | Pld | W | D | L | GF | GA | GD | Pts | Qualification | PAR | VES | FLE | THW | KIE | BRE | CEL | ALB |
|---|---|---|---|---|---|---|---|---|---|---|---|---|---|---|---|---|---|---|
| 1 | (France) Paris Saint-Germain | 14 | 11 | 1 | 2 | 424 | 378 | +46 | 23 | Quarterfinals | — | 33–27 | 29–21 | 29–29 | 33–28 | 32–28 | 32–27 | 31–28 |
| 2 | (Hungary) Telekom Veszprém | 14 | 8 | 2 | 4 | 407 | 378 | +29 | 18 (Note: Telekom Veszprém 59–58 Flensburg-Handewitt) | First knockout round | 24–29 | — | 28–27 | 26–24 | 31–26 | 34–22 | 29–22 | 30–24 |
| 3 | (Germany) Flensburg-Handewitt | 14 | 7 | 4 | 3 | 410 | 391 | +19 | 18 | First knockout round | 33–29 | 31–31 | — | 30–33 | 32–32 | 37–30 | 33–28 | 30–27 |
| 4 | (Germany) THW Kiel | 14 | 7 | 2 | 5 | 366 | 361 | +5 | 16 | First knockout round | 22–25 | 22–20 | 20–20 | — | 29–30 | 33–23 | 26–29 | 27–26 |
| 5 | (Poland) PGE Vive Kielce | 14 | 6 | 3 | 5 | 418 | 408 | +10 | 15 | First knockout round | 29–30 | 32–32 | 25–25 | 32–21 | — | 33–28 | 37–31 | 28–27 |
| 6 | (Belarus) Meshkov Brest | 14 | 4 | 2 | 8 | 374 | 406 | −32 | 10 | First knockout round | 29–28 | 26–29 | 28–30 | 24–25 | 28–25 | — | 29–24 | 23–23 |
| 7 | (Slovenia) Celje | 14 | 3 | 1 | 10 | 398 | 434 | −36 | 7 | | 26–31 | 31–39 | 27–30 | 27–28 | 31–27 | 33–33 | — | 31–28 |
| 8 | (Denmark) Aalborg Håndbold | 14 | 2 | 1 | 11 | 364 | 405 | −41 | 5 | | 26–33 | 29–26 | 24–31 | 20–27 | 30–34 | 20–23 | 32–30 | — |

Source: EHF
Rules for classification: See Tiebreakers

=== Group C ===
| Pos | Team | Pld | W | D | L | GF | GA | GD | Pts | Qualification | SKJ | ADE | GOR | ELV | SCH | BUC |
|---|---|---|---|---|---|---|---|---|---|---|---|---|---|---|---|---|
| 1 | (Denmark) Skjern Håndbold | 10 | 8 | 0 | 2 | 326 | 252 | +74 | 16 | Playoffs | — | 33–25 | 35–20 | 35–25 | 32–22 | 39–28 |
| 2 | (Spain) CB Ademar León | 10 | 6 | 0 | 4 | 270 | 270 | 0 | 12 (Note: CB Ademar León 50–47 RK Gorenje Velenje) | Playoffs | 26–31 | — | 29–24 | 26–30 | 29–28 | 32–29 |
| 3 | (Slovenia) RK Gorenje Velenje | 10 | 6 | 0 | 4 | 271 | 271 | 0 | 12 | | 31–29 | 23–22 | — | 30–21 | 27–21 | 33–29 |
| 4 | (Norway) Elverum Håndball | 10 | 5 | 0 | 5 | 287 | 304 | −17 | 10 | | 27–32 | 25–30 | 29–28 | — | 26–22 | 40–32 |
| 5 | (Switzerland) Kadetten Schaffhausen | 10 | 4 | 0 | 6 | 263 | 274 | −11 | 8 | | 25–24 | 23–24 | 31–28 | 36–30 | — | 27–25 |
| 6 | (Romania) Dinamo București | 10 | 1 | 0 | 9 | 278 | 324 | −46 | 2 | | 23–36 | 24–28 | 26–27 | 33–34 | 29–28 | — |

Source: EHF
Rules for classification: See Tiebreakers

=== Group D ===
| Pos | Team | Pld | W | D | L | GF | GA | GD | Pts | Qualification | MON | ZAP | BES | SPO | SKO | MED |
|---|---|---|---|---|---|---|---|---|---|---|---|---|---|---|---|---|
| 1 | (France) Montpellier | 10 | 8 | 0 | 2 | 309 | 267 | +42 | 16 | Playoffs | — | 28–20 | 28–33 | 33–32 | 32–22 | 34–23 |
| 2 | (Ukraine) Motor Zaporizhzhia | 10 | 6 | 3 | 1 | 294 | 263 | +31 | 15 | Playoffs | 31–30 | — | 28–22 | 32–29 | 28–28 | 36–23 |
| 3 | (Turkey) Beşiktaş | 10 | 5 | 1 | 4 | 293 | 296 | −3 | 11 | | 32–36 | 28–28 | — | 26–30 | 32–29 | 33–29 |
| 4 | (Portugal) Sporting CP | 10 | 4 | 0 | 6 | 293 | 297 | −4 | 8 | | 29–33 | 23–31 | 34–27 | — | 31–27 | 31–30 |
| 5 | (North Macedonia) Metalurg Skopje | 10 | 2 | 1 | 7 | 262 | 293 | −31 | 5 (Note: Metalurg 57–55 Chekhovskiye Medvedi) | | 21–27 | 22–30 | 27–31 | 28–27 | — | 25–29 |
| 6 | (Russia) Chekhovskiye Medvedi | 10 | 2 | 1 | 7 | 271 | 306 | −35 | 5 | | 24–28 | 30–30 | 27–29 | 30–27 | 26–32 | — |

Source: EHF
Rules for classification: See Tiebreakers

=== Playoffs ===
The top two teams from Groups C and D contested a playoff to determine the two sides advancing to the knockout phase. The winners of each group faced the runners-up of the other group in a two-legged tie. The first leg was played on 24 February 2018 and the second leg on 4 March 2018.

| Team 1 | Agg. | Team 2 | 1st leg | 2nd leg |
|---|---|---|---|---|
| CB Ademar León (Spain) | 43–48 | (France) Montpellier | 24–28 | 19–20 |
| Motor Zaporizhzhia (Ukraine) | 58–63 | (Denmark) Skjern Håndbold | 32–30 | 26–33 |

== Knockout stage ==
The first-placed team from the preliminary groups A and B advanced to the quarterfinals, while the 2–6th placed teams advanced to the round of 16 alongside the playoff winners.

=== Round of 16 ===
| Team 1 | Agg. | Team 2 | 1st leg | 2nd leg |
|---|---|---|---|---|
| Montpellier (France) | 56–55 | (Spain) Barcelona Lassa | 28–25 | 28–30 |
| Skjern Håndbold (Denmark) | 61–59 | (Hungary) Telekom Veszprém | 32–25 | 29–34 |
| Meshkov Brest (Belarus) | 52–60 | (France) HBC Nantes | 24–32 | 28–28 |
| IFK Kristianstad (Sweden) | 46–53 | (Germany) Flensburg-Handewitt | 22–26 | 24–27 |
| PGE Vive Kielce (Poland) | 77–47 | (Germany) Rhein-Neckar Löwen | 41–17 | 36–30 |
| THW Kiel (Germany) | 56–50 | (Hungary) MOL-Pick Szeged | 29–22 | 27–28 |

Notes

1. Order of legs reversed after original draw.
2. A scheduling conflict for the first leg resulted in the Rhein-Neckar Löwen only fielding their reserve team against Kielce while the first team played a Handball-Bundesliga match against THW Kiel on the same day.

=== Quarterfinals ===
| Team 1 | Agg. | Team 2 | 1st leg | 2nd leg |
|---|---|---|---|---|
| THW Kiel (Germany) | 56–56 | (North Macedonia) Vardar | 28–29 | 28–27 |
| PGE Vive Kielce (Poland) | 60–69 | (France) Paris Saint-Germain | 28–34 | 32–35 |
| Flensburg-Handewitt (Germany) | 45–57 | (France) Montpellier | 28–28 | 17–29 |
| HBC Nantes (France) | 60–54 | (Denmark) Skjern Håndbold | 33–27 | 27–27 |

=== Bracket ===
Semifinals
26 May
(France) HBC Nantes | 32
(France) Paris Saint-Germain | 28
26 May
(North Macedonia) Vardar | 27
(France) Montpellier | 28

Final
27 May
(France) HBC Nantes | 27
(France) Montpellier | 32
Third place
27 May
(France) Paris Saint-Germain | 29
(North Macedonia) Vardar | 28

==== Final ====
| 27 May 2018; 18:00 | HBC Nantes (France) | 27–32 | (France) Montpellier | Lanxess Arena, Cologne; Attendance: 19,250; Referees: López, Ramírez (ESP) |
| 27 May 2018; 18:00 | Lazarov 6 | (13–16) | Fabregas, Simonet 6 | Lanxess Arena, Cologne; Attendance: 19,250; Referees: López, Ramírez (ESP) |
| 27 May 2018; 18:00 | 2× (yellow card) 2× (suspension) | Report | 1× (yellow card) 3× (suspension) | Lanxess Arena, Cologne; Attendance: 19,250; Referees: López, Ramírez (ESP) |

== Statistics and awards ==
=== Top goalscorers ===
As of 27 May 2018

| Rank | Player | Club | Goals |
|---|---|---|---|
| 1 | (Germany) Uwe Gensheimer | (France) Paris Saint-Germain | 92 |
| 2 | (Sweden) Markus Olsson | (Denmark) Skjern Håndbold | 88 |
| 3 | (Switzerland) Andy Schmid | (Germany) Rhein-Neckar Löwen | 83 |
| 4 | (France) Nedim Remili | (France) Paris Saint-Germain | 80 |
| 5 | (Spain) Alex Dujshebaev | (Poland) PGE Vive Kielce | 79 |
| 5 | (Spain) Eduardo Gurbindo | (France) HBC Nantes | 79 |
| 7 | (France) Nicolas Tournat | (France) HBC Nantes | 76 |
| 8 | (Hungary) Máté Lékai | (Hungary) Telekom Veszprém | 75 |
| 9 | (Montenegro) Vuko Borozan | (North Macedonia) Vardar | 74 |
| 9 | (Poland) Michał Jurecki | (Poland) PGE Vive Kielce | 74 |
| 9 | (Norway) Bjarte Myrhol | (Denmark) Skjern Håndbold | 74 |

=== Awards ===
The all-star team was announced on 25 May 2018.

- Goalkeeper: Arpad Sterbik (ESP)
- Right wing: David Balaguer (ESP)
- Right back: Dika Mem (FRA)
- Centre back: Nikola Karabatić (FRA)
- Left back: Sander Sagosen (NOR)
- Left wing: Uwe Gensheimer (GER)
- Pivot: Bjarte Myrhol (NOR)

Other awards

- MVP of the Final four: Diego Simonet (ARG)
- Best Defender: Luka Karabatic (FRA)
- Best Young player: Romain Lagarde (FRA)
- Coach: Patrice Canayer (FRA)
