= France men's national handball team =

National handball team

France

Information
- Nickname: 1992: les Bronzés; 1993–1996: les Barjots; 2001–2008: les Costauds; 2008–2017: les Experts
- Association: French Handball Federation
- Coach: Talant Dujshebaev
- Assistant coach: Yohann Delattre; Jean-Luc Kieffer
- Most caps: Jackson Richardson (417)
- Most goals: Jérôme Fernandez (1,463)

Colours
1st	2nd

Results

Summer Olympics
- Appearances: 9 (First in 1992)
- Best result: (gold) 1st (2008, 2012, 2020)

World Championship
- Appearances: 25 (First in 1954)
- Best result: (gold) 1st (1995, 2001, 2009, 2011, 2015, 2017)

European Championship
- Appearances: 17 (First in 1994)
- Best result: (gold) 1st (2006, 2010, 2014, 2024)
- Last updated on Unknown.

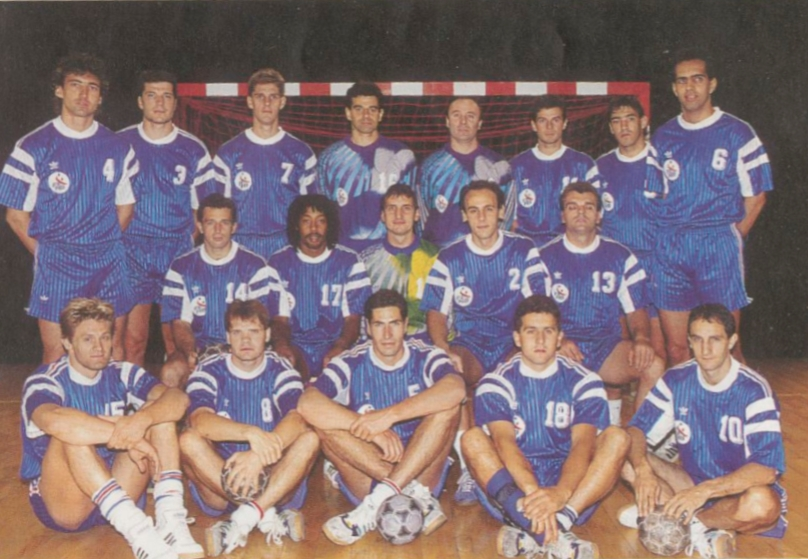
The France men's national handball team in 1992

France men's national handball team
Medal record

Olympic Games
Gold medal – first place	2008 Beijing	Team
Gold medal – first place	2012 London	Team
Gold medal – first place	2020 Tokyo	Team
Silver medal – second place	2016 Rio de Janeiro	Team
Bronze medal – third place	1992 Barcelona	Team

World Championship
Gold medal – first place	1995 Iceland	
Gold medal – first place	2001 France	
Gold medal – first place	2009 Croatia	
Gold medal – first place	2011 Sweden	
Gold medal – first place	2015 Qatar	
Gold medal – first place	2017 France	
Silver medal – second place	1993 Sweden	
Silver medal – second place	2023 Poland/Sweden	
Bronze medal – third place	1997 Japan	
Bronze medal – third place	2003 Portugal	
Bronze medal – third place	2005 Tunisia	
Bronze medal – third place	2019 Germany/Denmark	
Bronze medal – third place	2025 Croatia/Denmark/Norway	

European Championship
Gold medal – first place	2006 Switzerland	
Gold medal – first place	2010 Austria	
Gold medal – first place	2014 Denmark	
Gold medal – first place	2024 Germany	
Bronze medal – third place	2008 Norway	
Bronze medal – third place	2018 Croatia	

Mediterranean Games
Silver medal – second place	1987 Latakia	
Silver medal – second place	1993 Languedoc-Roussillon	
Bronze medal – third place	2001 Tunis	
Silver medal – second place	2009 Pescara	

The France national handball team is supervised by the French Handball Federation, and represents France in international matches. It is the first handball team to have held all three titles twice (the Danish women's team also held all three in 1997, and the Danish men's team have done so in 2026), and the only national team in its sport to hold six world titles and a total of thirteen medals at the World Men's Handball Championship. With a total of five medals, including three gold in 2008, 2012 and 2021, France is also the most successful Handball team at the Summer Olympics.

== Results at international tournaments ==
Since the 1990s, France has emerged as a major handball team. France won the bronze medal in the 1992 Summer Olympics, giving birth to their first nickname: les Bronzés (meaning tanned in French, a reference both to bronze and to cult French film Les Bronzés). This led to an increased popularity of the sport in France, which was already one of the most popular in primary and secondary schools.

One year after their Olympic medal, les Bronzés reached the final of the 1993 World Championship, which they lost against Russia.

In 1995, France won the World Championship in Iceland, defeating Croatia in the final. The team became known as les Barjots because the players played the final with an extravagant haircut (barjot is a slang word for crazy in French).

The team finished 4th in the 1996 Summer Olympics (France lost the bronze medal game to Spain, whom they had beaten in the first round). France finished third a year later in the 1997 World Championship. The team finished 6th in the 1999 World Championship and in the 2000 Summer Olympics.

France won the world title again in the 2001 World Championship organised in France. During both their quarterfinal and final, against Germany and Sweden respectively, they were one goal behind until a few seconds before the end of the game, but scored a late goal and finally win in overtime with a three-goal margin. This great strength of character was cause for their new nickname: les Costauds (the strong, or the tough). Five members of les Costauds had already been world champions in 1995 with les Barjots: Jackson Richardson, Grégory Anquetil, Patrick Cazal, and the goalkeepers Bruno Martini and Christian Gaudin.

The team finished third in the 2003 World Championship. In the 2004 Olympics, the teamed finished 5th. Although they won their five games of the preliminary round, the team lost to an ageing Russian team led by 42-year-old goalkeeper Andrey Lavrov in the quarterfinals (24–26).

In the 2005 World Championship, France finished third again. This was the last international competition played by Jackson Richardson, a veteran from the first team les Bronzés. The retirement of their star meant for the French team the final transition between the early successes and the new generation of players.

In 2006 France won for the first time the European Championship, a competition in which they had never won a medal until then. In the final, they overwhelmed Spain, the reigning world champions (31–23), against whom they had lost the opening match in the preliminary round.

In 2008, France finished third in the European Championship. They were undefeated until the semi-final, which they lost to Croatia.

France won the gold medal in the Beijing Olympics. The French players elected to call themselves Les Experts, which is the French title for the TV show CSI in France. The team won the gold medal in the 2008 handball tournament in Beijing, defeating underdogs Iceland in the final (28–23). Thierry Omeyer, Daniel Narcisse and Bertrand Gille were voted into the tournament's All Star team.

France won the world title again in 2009 at the 2009 World Championship, hosted by Croatia, against the organizing country, and the European title in 2010 in Austria, once more against Croatia. As a result, they became the first men's team to hold the three major titles in the sport (olympic title, world title and European title) simultaneously (Denmark women's national handball team held all three titles in 1997). It also became the third team to have won all three titles ever, the other two being Germany and Russia.

In the 2011 World Championship, France held its title, winning against Denmark (37–35 after extra time). This victory, in addition to granting an automatic participation to the 2012 Olympics, marked several achievements:

- it became, with Romania (1964, 1974) and Sweden (1958), one of the few handball teams (on the men's side) to have successfully defended a world champion status;
- it became (and is the only, so far) the first national handball team in history to have won four major titles in a row;
- three players on the team (Jérôme Fernandez, Thierry Omeyer and Didier Dinart) achieved three world champions titles – putting them on par with Cornel Oţelea from Romania in the 60s (had he been present in 2009, Bertrand Gille would also have been one of them, but he missed 2009 due to injuries).

The 2012 and 2013 years were a mixed bag for the team; after an unexpected setback at the 2012 European championship where the team ended up in 11th place, it went on to be the first national handball team to retain the Olympic title at the London Olympic games. In 2013, they ended up being defeated by Croatia in this year's world championship.

2014 saw France regain its European title after losing it in 2012. Of note is that just like in 2009, the team ended up winning the final against the host country.

In 2015, they won their 5th World Champion title against host country Qatar. Thierry Omeyer was elected Most Valuable Player of the tournament; this was the first time in the IHF history that a goalkeeper was elected as an MVP. By doing so, they became the first team in the history of the sport to hold the three major titles for the second time.

In 2016, Les Experts lost their Olympic title in Rio, finishing second after a defeat in final against Denmark.

In 2017, they won their 6th World Champion title at home against Norway (33–26). Nikola Karabatic was elected Most Valuable Player of the tournament. Thierry Omeyer and Daniel Narcisse retired after the tournament, with two Olympic gold medals, three European titles, and respectively five and four world championship titles.

== Honours ==
Olympic Games
- Gold Medal: 2008, 2012, 2020
- Silver Medal: 2016
- Bronze Medal: 1992

World Championship
- Winners: 1995, 2001, 2009, 2011, 2015, 2017
- Runners-up: 1993, 2023
- Third-place: 1997, 2003, 2005, 2019, 2025

European Championship
- Winners: 2006, 2010, 2014, 2024
- Third-place: 2008, 2018

EHF Euro Cup
- Winners: 2026

Competition	1st place, gold medalist(s)	2nd place, silver medalist(s)	3rd place, bronze medalist(s)	Total
Olympic Games	3	1	1	5
World Championship	6	2	5	13
European Championship	4	0	2	6
Total	13	3	8	24

== Competitive record ==
Champions Runners-up Third place Fourth place

=== Olympic Games ===
Games	Round	Position	Pld	W	D	L	GF	GA	GD
(Germany) 1936 Berlin	did not participate								
(West Germany) 1972 Munich	did not qualify								
(Canada) 1976 Montreal	did not qualify								
(Soviet Union) 1980 Moscow	did not qualify								
(United States) 1984 Los Angeles	did not qualify								
(South Korea) 1988 Seoul	did not qualify								
(Spain) 1992 Barcelona	Third place	3rd of 12	7	5	0	2	157	143	+14
(United States) 1996 Atlanta	Fourth place	4th of 12	7	4	0	3	190	165	+25
(Australia) 2000 Sydney	Match for 5th place	6th of 12	8	4	1	3	192	177	+15
(Greece) 2004 Athens	Match for 5th place	5th of 12	8	7	0	1	221	176	+45
(China) 2008 Beijing	Champions	1st of 12	8	7	1	0	228	185	+43
(United Kingdom) 2012 London	Champions	1st of 12	8	7	0	1	229	175	+54
(Brazil) 2016 Rio de Janeiro	Runners-up	2nd of 12	8	6	0	2	241	209	+32
(Japan) 2020 Tokyo	Champions	1st of 12	8	7	0	1	256	222	+34
(France) 2024 Paris	Quarterfinals	8th of 12	6	2	1	3	163	166	−3
(United States) 2028 Los Angeles	TBD								
(Australia) 2032 Brisbane	TBD								
Total	9/15	3 Titles	68	49	3	16	1,877	1,618	+259

=== World Championship ===
Year	Round	Position	GP	W	D	L	GS	GA
(Germany) 1938	did not qualify							
(Sweden) 1954	Preliminary Round	6	3	0	1	2	26	61
(East Germany) 1958	Preliminary Round	9	3	1	0	2	66	57
(West Germany) 1961	Main Round	8	6	1	0	5	70	105
(Czech Republic) 1964	Preliminary Round	14	3	0	0	3	41	64
(Sweden) 1967	Preliminary Round	10	3	1	0	2	34	41
(France) 1970	Preliminary Round	11	6	1	0	5	80	105
(East Germany) 1974	did not qualify							
(Denmark) 1978	Preliminary Round	16	3	0	0	3	54	97
(West Germany) 1982	did not qualify							
(Switzerland) 1986	did not qualify							
(Czech Republic) 1990	Second round	9	7	3	1	3	161	158
(Sweden) 1993	Runners-up	Silver medal	7	5	0	2	155	151
(Iceland) 1995	Champions	Gold medal	9	7	0	2	218	185
(Japan) 1997	Third place	Bronze medal	9	7	0	2	223	206
(Egypt) 1999	Quarter-finals	6	9	6	0	3	241	210
(France) 2001	Champions	Gold medal	9	9	0	0	233	172
(Portugal) 2003	Third place	Bronze medal	9	7	0	2	257	194
(Tunisia) 2005	Third place	Bronze medal	10	6	2	2	301	240
(Germany) 2007	Fourth place	4	10	6	0	4	300	243
(Croatia) 2009	Champions	Gold medal	10	9	0	1	296	211
(Sweden) 2011	Champions	Gold medal	10	9	1	0	327	245
(Spain) 2013	Quarter-finals	6	7	5	0	2	207	182
(Qatar) 2015	Champions	Gold medal	9	8	1	0	259	215
(France) 2017	Champions	Gold medal	9	9	0	0	282	218
(Denmark) / (Germany) 2019	Third place	Bronze medal	10	7	1	2	278	251
(Egypt) 2021	Fourth place	4	9	7	0	2	267	250
(Poland) / (Sweden) 2023	Runners-up	Silver medal	9	8	0	1	301	245
(Croatia) / (Denmark) / (Norway) 2025	Third place	Bronze medal	9	8	0	1	316	246
(Germany) 2027	Qualified							
(France) / (Germany) 2029	Qualified as co-host							
(Denmark) / (Iceland) / (Norway) 2031	TBD							
Total	26/32	6 titles	188	130	7	51	4993	4352

=== European Championship ===
Year	Round	Position	GP	W	D	L	GS	GA
(Portugal) 1994	5th/6th place	6	6	2	1	3	148	148
(Spain) 1996	7th/8th place	7	6	4	0	2	154	141
(Italy) 1998	7th/8th place	7	6	2	1	3	140	153
(Croatia) 2000	Fourth place	4	7	4	1	2	173	164
(Sweden) 2002	5th/6th place	6	7	3	2	2	180	167
(Slovenia) 2004	5th/6th place	6	7	3	1	3	189	182
(Switzerland) 2006	Champions	1	8	7	0	1	243	192
(Norway) 2008	Third place	3	8	6	0	2	231	207
(Austria) 2010	Champions	1	8	6	2	0	225	196
(Serbia) 2012	Main round	11	6	2	1	3	156	163
(Denmark) 2014	Champions	1	8	7	0	1	259	227
(Poland) 2016	5th/6th place	5	7	5	0	2	210	182
(Croatia) 2018	Third place	3	8	7	0	1	244	212
(Austria) (Norway) (Sweden) 2020	Preliminary round	14	3	1	0	2	82	79
(Hungary) (Slovakia) 2022	Fourth place	4	9	6	0	3	278	248
(Germany) 2024	Champions	1	9	8	1	0	306	270
(Denmark) (Norway) (Sweden) 2026	Main round	7	7	4	0	3	267	232
(Portugal) (Spain) (Switzerland) 2028	TBD							
(Czech Republic) (Denmark) (Poland) 2030	TBD							
(France) (Germany) 2032	Qualified as co-host							
Total	17/18	4 titles	120	77	10*	33	3485	3163

*Denotes draws include knockout matches decided in a penalty shootout.

== Team ==
=== Current squad ===
Roster for the 2026 European Men's Handball Championship.

Head coach: Talant Dujshebaev

No.	Pos.	Name	Date of birth (age)	Height	App.	Goals	Club
2	RW	Yanis Lenne	29 June 1996 (age 30)	1.87 m	66	131	(Hungary) Veszprém KC
4	CB	Aymeric Minne	20 April 1997 (age 29)	1.86 m	49	159	(France) HBC Nantes
6	RB	Julien Bos	18 August 1998 (age 27)	1.88 m	23	35	(France) HBC Nantes
8	LB	Elohim Prandi	24 August 1998 (age 27)	1.93 m	64	176	(France) Paris Saint-Germain
9	RB	Melvyn Richardson	31 January 1997 (age 29)	1.90 m	115	296	(Poland) Wisła Płock
10	RB	Dika Mem	31 August 1997 (age 28)	1.94 m	141	528	(Spain) FC Barcelona
11	P	Nicolas Tournat	5 April 1994 (age 32)	2.00 m	120	281	(France) HBC Nantes
12	GK	Valentin Kieffer	2 July 1999 (age 27)	1.90 m	2	0	(France) Dunkerque HB
16	GK	Charles Bolzinger	14 December 2000 (age 25)	1.98 m	28	1	(France) Montpellier Handball
23	P	Ludovic Fabregas	1 July 1996 (age 30)	1.98 m	166	416	(Spain) FC Barcelona
25	LW	Hugo Descat	16 August 1992 (age 33)	1.83 m	73	320	(Hungary) Veszprém KC
29	RW	Benoît Kounkoud	19 February 1997 (age 29)	1.90 m	67	98	(Poland) KS Kielce
30	LW	Wallem Peleka	18 January 2002 (age 24)	1.96 m	4	0	(France) Paris Saint-Germain
31	LW	Dylan Nahi	30 November 1999 (age 26)	1.98 m	81	218	(Poland) KS Kielce
34	P	Karl Konan	3 June 1995 (age 31)	2.00 m	59	8	(France) Paris Saint-Germain
37	LB	Aymeric Zaepfel	3 October 2001 (age 24)	1.89 m	3	2	(France) Pays d'Aix Université Club
39	LB	Thibaud Briet	14 December 1999 (age 26)	2.05 m	46	100	(France) HBC Nantes
92	GK	Rémi Desbonnet	28 February 1992 (age 34)	1.82 m	68	6	(France) Montpellier Handball

=== Records ===
==== Most capped players ====
Highlighted names denote a player still playing or available for selection.

#	Name	Career	Caps	Goals
1	Jackson Richardson	1990–2005	417	787
2	Jérôme Fernandez	1997–2015	390	1,463
3	Didier Dinart	1996–2013	379	162
4	Thierry Omeyer	1999–2017	358	4
5	Nikola Karabatić	2002–2024	356	1,293
6	Daniel Narcisse	2000–2017	311	943
7	Guillaume Gille	1996–2012	308	678
8	Michaël Guigou	2002–2021	307	1021
9	Philippe Gardent	1983–1995	298	635
10	Pascal Mahé	1984–1996	297	739

Last updated: 11 January 2023

==== Top goalscorers ====
Highlighted names denote a player still playing or available for selection.

#	Player	Career	Goals	Caps	Average
1	Jérôme Fernandez	1997–2015	1,463	390	3.75
2	Nikola Karabatić	2002–2024	1,293	356	3.67
3	Michaël Guigou	2002–2021	1,021	307	3.33
4	Frédéric Volle	1987–1996	1,016	241	4.22
5	Daniel Narcisse	2000–2017	943	311	3.03
6	Stéphane Stoecklin	1990–1999	898	238	3.77
7	Luc Abalo	2005–2021	859	289	2.97
8	Bertrand Gille	1997–2013	806	268	3.01
9	Jackson Richardson	1990–2005	787	417	1.89
10	Pascal Mahé	1984–1996	739	297	2.49

Last updated: 11 January 2023

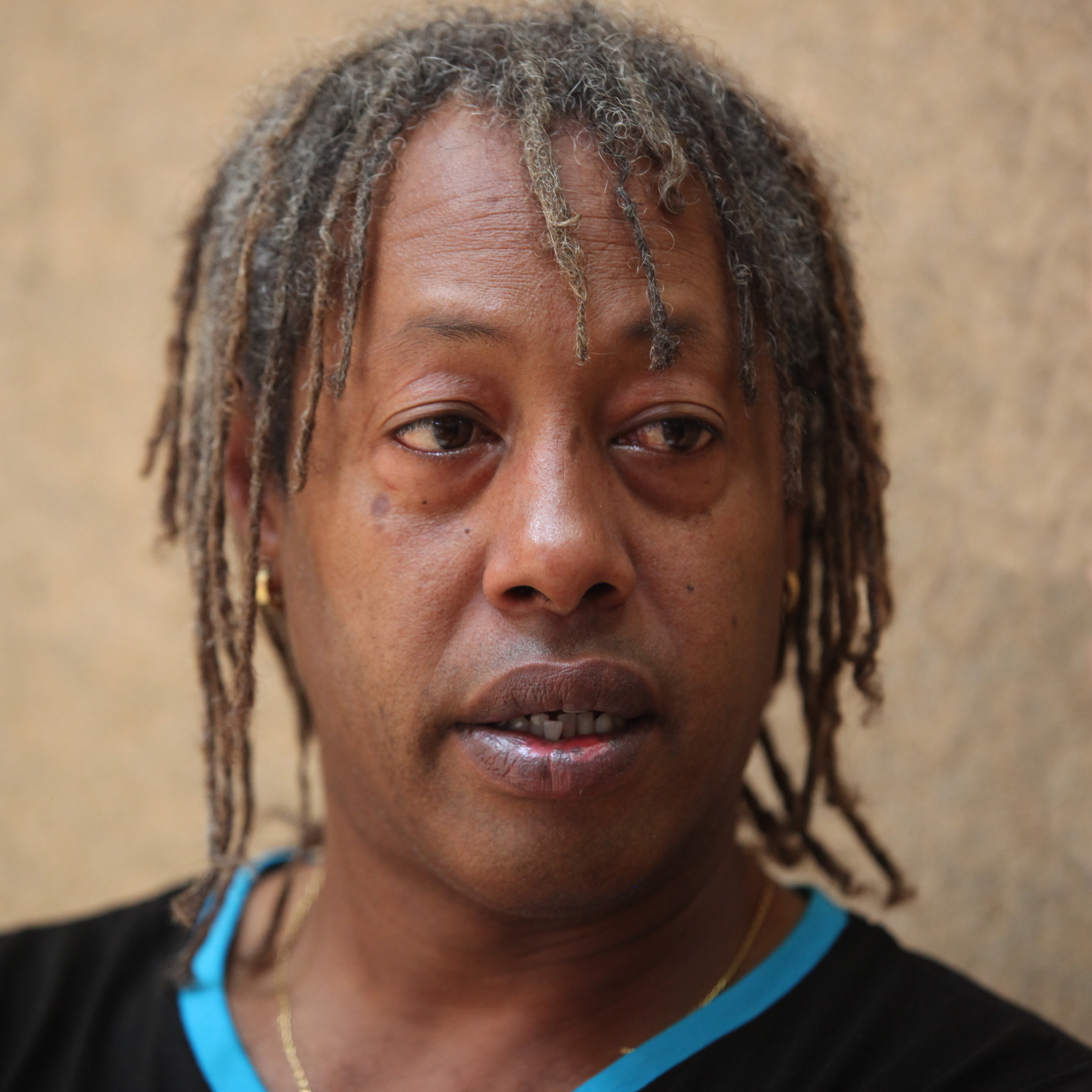
Jackson Richardson is the most capped player in the history of France with 417 caps.

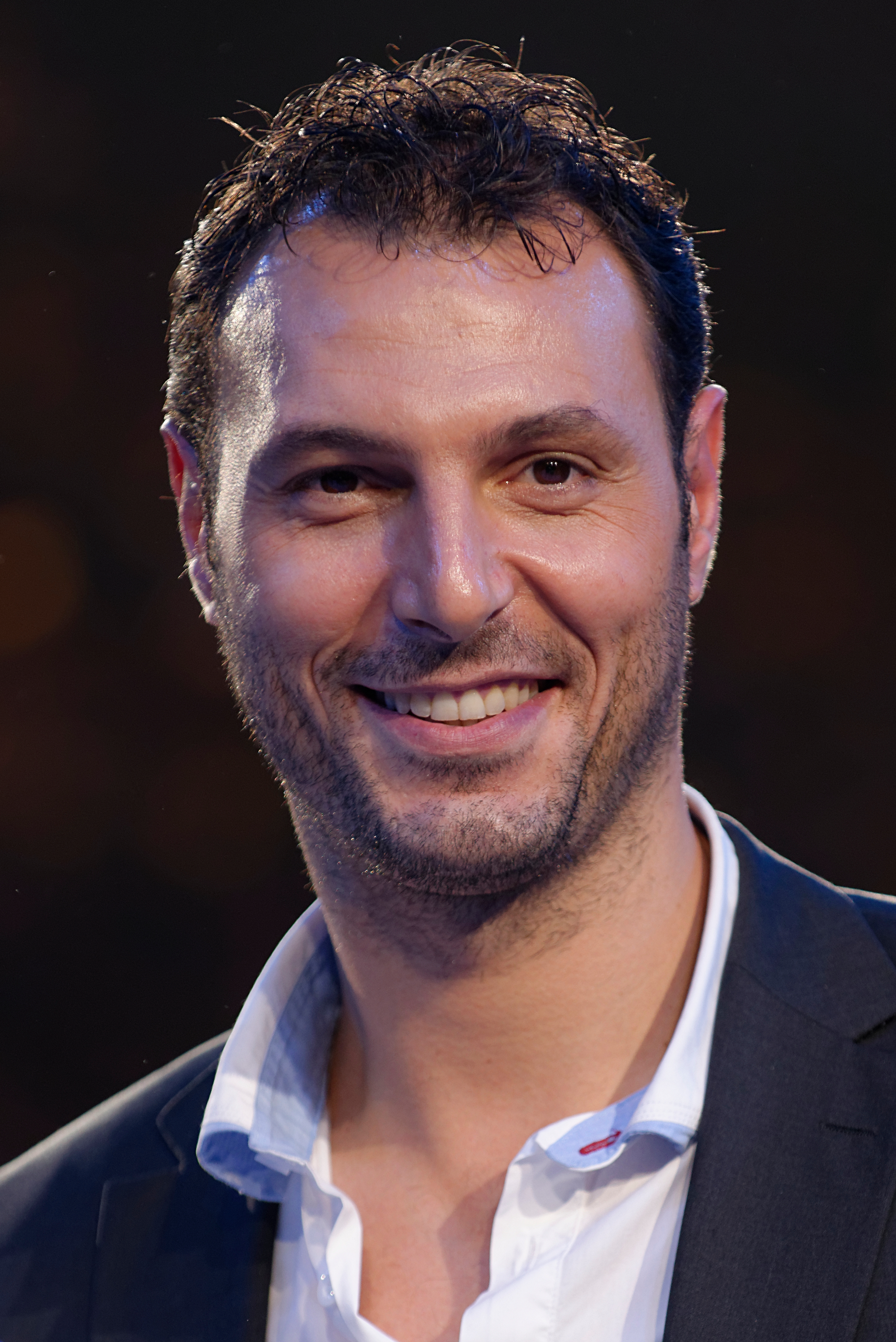
Jérôme Fernandez is the top scorer in the history of France with 1,463 goals.
