= 2002–03 EHF Champions League =

European handball tournament

EHF Champions League
- 2002–03

Tournament information
- Sport: Handball
- Dates: 7 September 2002–4 May 2003
- Administrator: EHF
- Participants: 32

Final positions
- Champions: Montpellier HB

Tournament statistics
- Top scorer: (Croatia) Mirza Džomba (67)

The 2002–03 EHF Champions League was the 43rd edition of Europe's premier club handball tournament. SC Magdeburg were the reigning champions. Montpellier HB won the title beating Portland San Antonio in the final. This was the first time ever a French team won the tournament.

== Round 1 ==
Team #1	Agg.	Team #2	1st match	2nd match
Panellinios AC Athen (Greece)	56–48	(Turkey) ASKI Ankara	30–23	26–25
SKA Minsk (Belarus)	48–55	(Lithuania) Granitas Kaunas	23–25	25–30
Bregenz Handball (Austria)	59–43	(Cyprus) SPE Strovolos Nicosia	31–19	28–24
Pallamano Trieste (Italy)	59–54	(Bosnia and Herzegovina) RK Izviđač	33–27	26–27
HC Eynatten (Belgium)	52–63	(North Macedonia) RK Vardar Skopje	28–31	24–32
MŠK Považská Bystrica (Slovakia)	70–48	(Georgia (country)) GTU Shevardeni Tbilisi	35–25	35–23
Handball Esch (Luxembourg)	45–51	(Netherlands) V&L Geleen	24–25	21–26
HK Lokomotiv Varna (Bulgaria)	37–75	(Romania) Fibrex Săvineşti	20–41	17–34

== Round 2 ==
Team #1	Agg.	Team #2	1st match	2nd match
HC Baník Karviná (Czech Republic)	67–47	(Slovakia) MŠK Považská Bystrica	31–25	36–22
V&L Geleen (Netherlands)	43–69	(Poland) Wisla Plock	24–28	19–41
Sandefjord TIF (Norway)	49–55	(North Macedonia) RK Vardar Skopje	26–26	23–29
Fibrex Săvineşti (Romania)	43–41	(Socialist Federal Republic of Yugoslavia) RK Partizan Belgrade	28–19	15–22
HK Drott Halmstad (Sweden)	49–51	(Greece) Panellinios AC Athen	29–26	20–25
Bregenz Handball (Austria)	47–62	(Russia) Chekhovskiye Medvedi	25–31	22–31
Shakhtar-Academiya Donetsk (Ukraine)	46–44	(Lithuania) Granitas Kaunas	34–24	12–20
Pallamano Trieste (Italy)	60–51	(Switzerland) Pfadi Winterthur	31–26	29–25

== Group stage ==
=== Group A ===
Pos	Team	Pld	W	D	L	GF	GA	GD	Pts
1	KC Veszprém	6	6	0	0	163	127	+36	12
2	SC Magdeburg	6	4	0	2	179	166	+13	8
3	Wisła Płock	6	1	0	5	167	195	−28	2
4	Panellinios AC Athens	6	1	0	5	131	152	−21	2

Source: EHF

09.11.2002	Panellinios AC Athens	17	29	SC Magdeburg
09.11.2002	Wisła Płock	25	30	KC Veszprém
17.11.2002	KC Veszprém	19	13	Panellinios AC Athens
16.11.2002	SC Magdeburg	40	32	Wisła Płock
24.11.2002	KC Veszprém	31	22	SC Magdeburg
23.11.2002	Panellinios AC Athens	30	29	Wisła Płock
30.11.2002	Panellinios AC Athens	16	17	KC Veszprém
30.11.2002	Wisła Płock	29	31	SC Magdeburg
08.12.2002	SC Magdeburg	30	29	Panellinios AC Athens
08.12.2002	KC Veszprém	38	24	Wisła Płock
15.12.2002	SC Magdeburg	27	28	KC Veszprém
14.12.2002	Wisła Płock	28	26	Panellinios AC Athens

=== Group B ===
Pos	Team	Pld	W	D	L	GF	GA	GD	Pts
1	Portland San Antonio	6	5	0	1	180	142	+38	10
2	KIF Kolding	6	4	0	2	178	152	+26	8
3	Generali Pallam. Trieste	6	2	1	3	163	175	−12	5
4	Shakhtar-Academiya Donetsk	6	0	1	5	135	187	−52	1

Source: EHF

10.11.2002	Shakhtar-Academiya Donetsk	18	30	Portland San Antonio
09.11.2002	Generali Pallam. Trieste	32	31	Kolding IF
16.11.2002	Kolding IF	33	23	Shakhtar-Academiya Donetsk
17.11.2002	Portland San Antonio	31	23	Generali Pallam. Trieste
23.11.2002	Kolding IF	24	21	Portland San Antonio
23.11.2002	Shakhtar-Academiya Donetsk	24	24	Generali Pallam. Trieste
30.11.2002	Shakhtar-Academiya Donetsk	22	30	Kolding IF
30.11.2002	Generali Pallam. Trieste	26	32	Portland San Antonio
07.12.2002	Portland San Antonio	34	21	Shakhtar-Academiya Donetsk
08.12.2002	Kolding IF	30	22	Generali Pallam. Trieste
15.12.2002	Portland San Antonio	32	30	Kolding IF
14.12.2002	Generali Pallam. Trieste	36	27	Shakhtar-Academiya Donetsk

=== Group C ===
Pos	Team	Pld	W	D	L	GF	GA	GD	Pts
1	Montpellier HB	6	5	0	1	166	160	+6	10
2	Prule 67 Ljubljana	6	4	0	2	179	169	+10	8
3	CH Medvedi	6	2	0	4	182	170	+12	4
4	HC Baník Karviná	6	1	0	5	167	195	−28	2

Source: EHF

10.11.2002	HC Banik Karvina	29	36	Prule 67 Ljubljana
10.11.2002	CH Medvedi	30	31	Montpellier HB
17.11.2002	Montpellier HB	32	30	HC Banik Karvina
17.11.2002	Prule 67 Ljubljana	34	28	CH Medvedi
24.11.2002	Montpellier HB	28	24	Prule 67 Ljubljana
24.11.2002	HC Banik Karvina	35	27	CH Medvedi
01.12.2002	HC Banik Karvina	23	26	Montpellier HB
01.12.2002	CH Medvedi	33	22	Prule 67 Ljubljana
08.12.1902	Prule 67 Ljubljana	34	27	HC Banik Karvina
08.12.2002	Montpellier HB	25	24	CH Medvedi
15.12.2002	Prule 67 Ljubljana	29	24	Montpellier HB
15.12.2002	CH Medvedi	40	23	HC Banik Karvina

=== Group D ===
Pos	Team	Pld	W	D	L	GF	GA	GD	Pts
1	THW Kiel	6	4	0	2	175	150	+25	8
2	RK Zagreb	6	3	1	2	156	154	+2	7
3	"Fibrexnylon" Savinesti	6	2	1	3	164	162	+2	5
4	Vardar Vatrost. Skopje	6	2	0	4	152	181	−29	4

Source: EHF

10.11.2002	"Fibrexnylon" Savinesti	21	26	THW Kiel
10.11.2002	Vardar Vatrost. Skopje	25	28	RK Zagreb
17.11.2002	RK Zagreb	24	24	"Fibrexnylon" Savinesti
16.11.2002	THW Kiel	34	23	Vardar Vatrost. Skopje
24.11.2002	RK Zagreb	23	28	THW Kiel
24.11.2002	"Fibrexnylon" Savinesti	38	26	Vardar Vatrost. Skopje
01.12.2002	"Fibrexnylon" Savinesti	28	23	RK Zagreb
01.12.2002	Vardar Vatrost. Skopje	27	26	THW Kiel
08.12.2002	THW Kiel	37	28	"Fibrexnylon" Savinesti
08.12.2002	RK Zagreb	30	25	Vardar Vatrost. Skopje
14.12.2002	THW Kiel	24	28	RK Zagreb
15.12.2002	Vardar Vatrost. Skopje	26	25	"Fibrexnylon" Savinesti

== Knockout stage ==
=== Quarterfinals ===
Team #1	Agg.	Team #2	1st match	2nd match
Kolding IF	57 – 63	Fotex KC Veszprém	31 – 27	26 – 36
SC Magdeburg	56 – 60	Portland San Antonio	22 – 26	34 – 34
RK Zagreb	53 – 62	Montpellier HB	28 – 28	25 – 34
RD Prule 67	61 – 59	THW Kiel	33 – 33	28 – 26

=== Semifinals ===
Team #1	Agg.	Team #2	1st match	2nd match
RD Prule 67	52 – 56	Montpellier HB	29 – 27	23 – 29
Portland San Antonio	54 – 50	Fotex KC Veszprém	28 – 20	26 – 30

=== Finals ===
Team #1	Agg.	Team #2	1st match	2nd match
Portland San Antonio	46 – 50	Montpellier HB	27 – 19	19 – 31
