= Claude Onesta =

French handball player (born 1957)

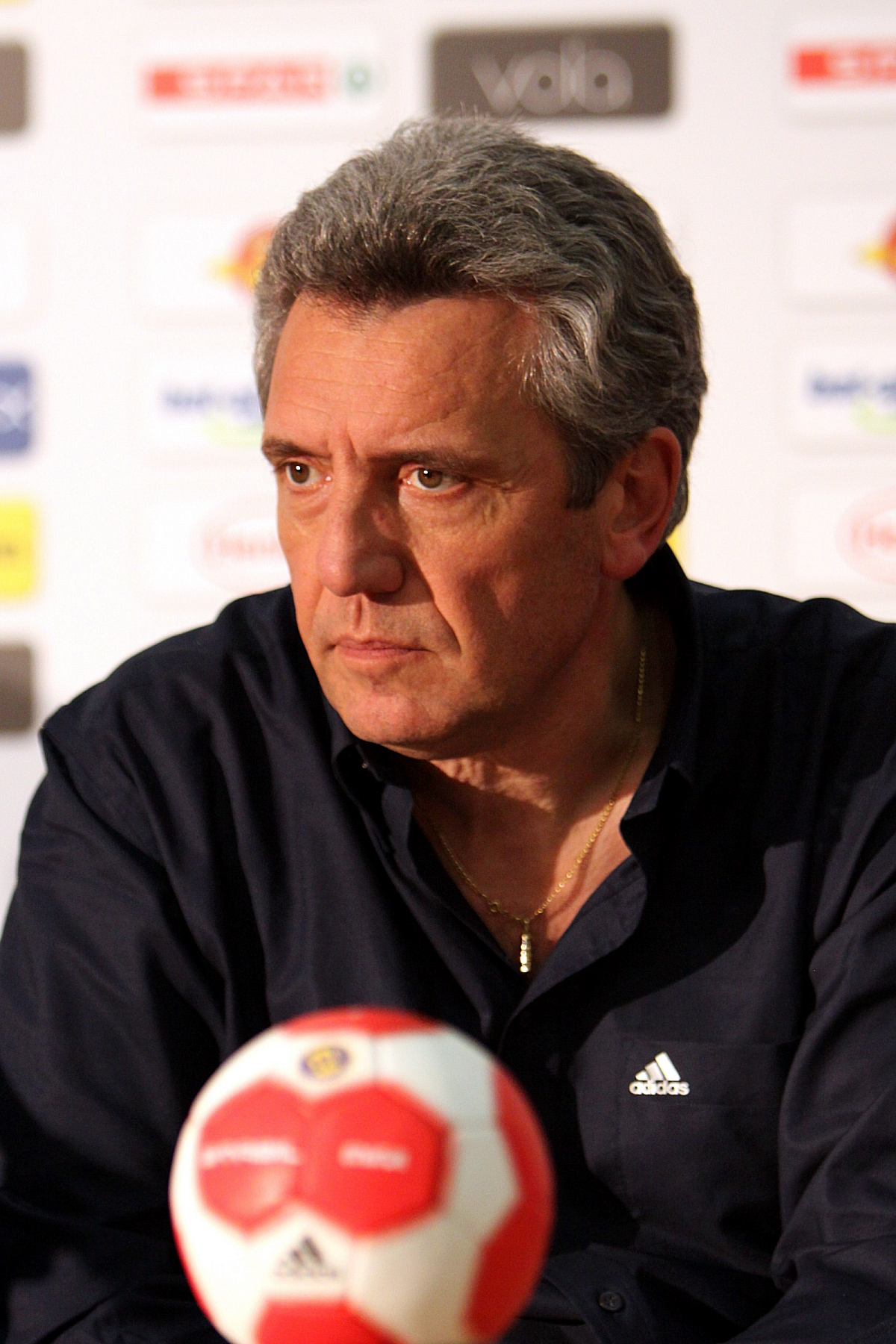
- Claude Onesta

Current position
- Title: General Manager
- Team: France

Biographical details
- Born: 6 February 1957 (age 69); Albi, Tarn (France)

Playing career
- 1968 – 1987: (France) Fenix Toulouse Handball

Coaching career (HC unless noted)
- 1987 – 2001: (France) Fenix Toulouse Handball
- 2001 – 2016: France

Administrative career (AD unless noted)
- 2016 – Till date: France (General Manager)

Accomplishments and honors

Championships
- 2 Olympic Games (2008, 2012); 3 World Championships (2009, 2011, 2015); 3 European Championships (2006, 2010, 2014)

Awards
- IHF World Handball Coach of the Year 2009; IHF World Handball Coach of the Year 2010

Medal record

Men's handball

Representing France

Olympic Games
Gold medal – first place	2008 Beijing	Team
Gold medal – first place	2012 London	Team
Silver medal – second place	2016 Rio de Janeiro	Team

World Championship
Gold medal – first place	2009 Croatia	
Gold medal – first place	2011 Sweden	
Gold medal – first place	2015 Qatar	
Bronze medal – third place	2003 Portugal	
Bronze medal – third place	2005 Tunisia	

European Championship
Gold medal – first place	2006 Switzerland	
Gold medal – first place	2010 Austria	
Gold medal – first place	2014 Denmark	
Bronze medal – third place	2008 Norway	

Claude Onesta (born 6 February 1957 in Albi, France) is a French handball coach, responsible of France's Men's handball team from 2001 to 2016.

Currently he is holding the position of General Manager of French Men's National Handball Team since 2016 after retiring from coaching career.

With his Russian counterpart Vladimir Maksimov, he has one of the most successful Handball coaching records with titles in major competitions such as The Olympics, The World Championship, and The European Championship. In January 2010, he led his team to a second European title becoming the first men's handball team to simultaneously hold the 3 major titles. It remains a record a year later, in January 2011, at The World Championship in Sweden, and on August 12, 2012, he led training that won a second consecutive Olympic Title at London. He again led the French team to The European Championship Title in 2014 after a victory against Denmark, the host country. He allowed the French team to win The World Championship Title at Qatar in 2015, by winning the finals against the host country. In total, Claude Onesta has led France to 9 finals, 8 of which were won.

== Biography ==
Claude Onesta was born on 6 February 1957 in Albi, to Ginette, a Tarnaise and Augustus, an Italian immigrant ( his father's family emigrated from Italy because of Fascism, at first passing by Brazil). His father was a rugby league (XIII) player in Albi and Villefranche-de-Rouergue.

=== Courses with Toulouse Handball ===
The Toulouse Handball Club has always been the club of Onesta: he began in 1968 at 11 and continued till 1987, when he became coach of the club. Under his leadership, the club made it to the elites in 1995. In the late 1990s, handball was the development of sport behind Toulouse FC and Toulousain Stadium. The head of the talented players were Jerome Fernandez, Christophe Kempe, Bruno Martini and Stephane Plantin, and Onesta made the most of his team, leading them to 3rd place of the French Championships 1997–1998, and mainly the winner of the France Cup 1998, having the best results of the club. If Onesta and the Toulousains reached the final for the France Cup 1999, the club would not have been able to confirm their best results, especially as the Toulouse sports project was aborted in the 2000s because of the disappearance of the basketball club.

=== The difficult debut for the French team ===
Before the Championship Title, he took the place of Daniel Costantini as the head coach of the French team. Under his direction, France received 2 new world medals with bronze in 2003 and 2005, a year which was also the farewell of Jackson Richardson to the team. During the World Cup in Tunisia, Onesta was on the verge of being fired after the very bad start of the French team during the preliminary round, in which they were defeated by Greece and forced to draw in the match against the Tunisians. On January 29, 2005, The French had to decide to leave or to double, which was necessary against Denmark (32-26), to save the name of their coach, before winning third place in the tournament with a win (26-25) against the Tunisians, the hosts of the tournament.

=== At the head of a legendary team ===
At the 2006 European Championship, he made his mark on French Handball by winning a medal in a European Championship, considering that the European Championship was deemed a difficult competition, and that handball was a sport in which all the top teams were European. This goal was accomplished in a beautiful fashion, by beating Spain, who held the world title, after eliminating the Olympic Champions, the Croatians, at the semi-finals.

The 2007 World Championship the following year was a difficult episode for Onesta and the French, as they were defeated by the German team. At the end of that match, Onesta declared: "A sense of injustice was present but we are still proud. It was a heroic game. This worldwide game is made for the Germans and the pressure of international authority certainly played. We knew we had won by a 3-4 goal lead."

For the 2008 European Championship, which took place in Norway, Claude Onesta had to deal with the withdrawal of two key players, Michaël Guigou and Joël Abati, as well as the disturbed preparation of another player, Bertrand Gille, because of a shoulder injury. The French team won all three of its games in the first round, and went on to beat Spain and Germany in the main round, securing its spot in the semi-finals. However, when it came to their match against the Croatian team, led by the brilliant Ivano Balić and Petar Metličić, they weren't as fortunate, and lost the match by a single point, with the final score of 23–24. The French team played against the German team in the match for 3rd place, and they got back at them for their defeat in 2007, beating them with a score of 36–26, and leaving the Europe Championship with a bronze medal.

Onesta led the team to the Olympic Title for the first time in 2008 in Beijing. The French Team, first in its group, faced the Russian Team in the quarter-final, defeating them 27–24. They went on to face the Croatian team once again at the semi-final. The French team took their revenge on the European Handball Champions, defeating them 25–23, largely thanks to a stunning performance by Cedric Burdet, a player who Onesta brought back into handball after he was thought to end his career a few months earlier. At the finals, France faced off against Iceland and defeated them 28–23, winning their first Olympic title ever.

In 2009, Onesta led the French team to the World Championship Title in Croatia, where they defeated the Croatians in their own stadium, the Zagreb Arena, in front of 15,000 spectators. With this victory, the French handball team entered the small circle of teams to have held both Olympic World Titles, after Germany (1936–1938), Yugoslavia (1984–1986) and the CIS-Russia (1992–1993). With these titles, Onesta became the first French national coach to have obtained 3 major titles: The European Championship, The Olympic Championship, and The World Championship. He was also the second to have achieved this feat in handball, after Russian coach, Vladimir Maximov.

On 31 January 2010, the French handball team achieved a historic feat. With the defeat of the Croatians 25–21 at the European Championship in Austria, the French team simultaneously held all three major titles: The European Championship, the World Championship, and The Olympic Championship. During this competition, which began in a rather laborious fashion for the favorites, Claude Onesta somewhat surprised observers by starting matches without Daniel Narcisse, with the left back position being occupied by Jerome Fernandez, and the right-back position being occupied by Sebastien Bosquet, who actually played better as a left back. This tactic had the effect of focusing on the players in the back, and France profited from this decision in the second period.

On 30 January 2011, the French team was back at the World Championship final. They went overtime to win against Denmark 37–35, and with this victory they won their 5th consecutive international competition, and added a 4th star on their jersey.

Some believed that the "Experts", as the French team was called, had finally run out of luck after a poor performance at the Euro 2012 ( they placed 11th), but Onesta quieted the naysayers after he led the French team to their second Olympic Title at the 2012 Olympic Games in London, with a victory over Sweden 22-21 during the final in August. Onesta's team was described by many commentators as the best team in history. At the end of the match, Ivano Balic commented : " It’s the best team of all time!". Six months later, the Blues were at the World Championship in Spain. They bowed out at the quarter-finals when they lost to the Croats. After 12 seasons of domination and with a record Onesta described as "a surreal 20", he stated his belief that "in the coming years, alternation, therefore, should predominate. And we will share the podium."

And yet, on 26 January 2014, Onesta once again led the French team to the European Championship Title. The Blues were the underdogs when they faced off against Denmark, considering their recent loss at the World Championship and the fact that Denmark had the luxury of playing in their own stadium, but they dominated the championship, and, in the final, managed to defeat the Danes in a sure victory. Leading 13–4 after 17 minutes and 23–16 at halftime, the Blues demonstrated, silencing the 15,000 fans in red and white. "Public pressure became negative for the Danes." recounted Onesta at the end of the match, "Some players, like Landin, were thrown off balance." Onesta's methods were discussed: Notably his tendency to conserve the key players ( Nikola Karabatic, Luc Abalo, Thierry Omeyer...) and integrate the younger players such as Valentin Porte and Luka Karabatic.

For the 2015 World Championship in Qatar, the French team won four of its group matches and drew one, but not in their normal fashion. During the eighth round and the quarter-final, the team got back into their stride, crushing Argentina 33–20 and Slovenia 32–23. In the semifinal, they faced Spain and defeated them 26–22, largely thanks to Thierry Omeyer, who was crowned MVP. The team went on win the Championship, defeating Qatar 25–22 in the final round.

== Personal life ==
His daughters Marina and Laura are also handball players, who play in the Women's Toulouse Handball Team.

His cousin, Gérard Onesta, is a former leader of the Greens (and now the Europe Ecology Greens) in the South West of France. He was a European MP from 1999 to 2009 and a four time vice-president of the European Parliament. He also has an older brother, Bruno Onesta, who is a professor of technology at a French High School in Puducherry, India.
