= Karaboué =

Karaboué is a surname. Notable people with the surname include:

- Daouda Karaboué (born 1975), French handball player
- Lossémy Karaboué (born 1988), Ivorian footballer
