= 2009 World Men's Handball Championship =

Svjetsko prvenstvo u rukometu 2009. (in Croatian)

Tournament details
- Host country: Croatia
- Venues: 7 (in 7 host cities)
- Dates: 16 January – 1 February
- Teams: 24 (from 5 confederations)

Final positions
- Champions: France (3rd title)
- Runners-up: Croatia
- Third place: Poland
- Fourth place: Denmark

Tournament statistics
- Matches played: 110
- Goals scored: 6,090 (55.36 per match)
- Attendance: 392,550 (3,569 per match)
- Top scorers: Kiril Lazarov (MKD) (92 goals)

Awards
- Best player: Igor Vori (CRO)

The 2009 World Men's Handball Championship was the 21st edition of the tournament that took place in Croatia from 16 January to 1 February, in the cities of Split, Zadar, Osijek, Varaždin, Poreč, Zagreb and Pula. Croatia was selected from a group of four potential hosts which included the Czech Republic, Greece and Romania.

The opening game and ceremony were held in Split, and the final game was played in Zagreb. France won the tournament after defeating Croatia in the final. Poland took the third place after winning over Denmark. Tickets for the tournament went on sale from 15 to 20 November. For the finals, ticket prices started at 700 kuna (c. €95). To promote the tournament, the Croatian National Tourist Board launched a series of presentations in the capitals of 13 participating countries.

During the championship internal criticism arose against Hassan Moustafa, President of the IHF. The secretary general of the IHF, Peter Mühlematter, criticized Moustafa and asked for his demission. Moustafa asked to exclude Mühlematter after his criticism.

== Venues ==
Seven Croatian cities were selected as hosts for the 2009 Championship: Split, Zadar, Osijek, Varaždin, Poreč, Zagreb and Pula. The sites included the new Spaladium Arena in Split and Arena Zagreb, where the final took place.

Zagreb	Varaždin	Osijek
Arena Zagreb; Capacity: 15,024	Varaždin Arena; Capacity: 5,200	Gradski vrt Hall; Capacity: 3,538
Poreč	2009 World Men's Handball Championship is located in Croatia	
Žatika Sport Centre; Capacity: 3,500	2009 World Men's Handball Championship is located in Croatia	
Pula	2009 World Men's Handball Championship is located in Croatia	
Mate Parlov Sport Centre; Capacity: 2,132	2009 World Men's Handball Championship is located in Croatia	
	Zadar	Split
	Krešimir Ćosić Hall; Capacity: 8,600	Spaladium Arena; Capacity: 10,941

== Qualification ==
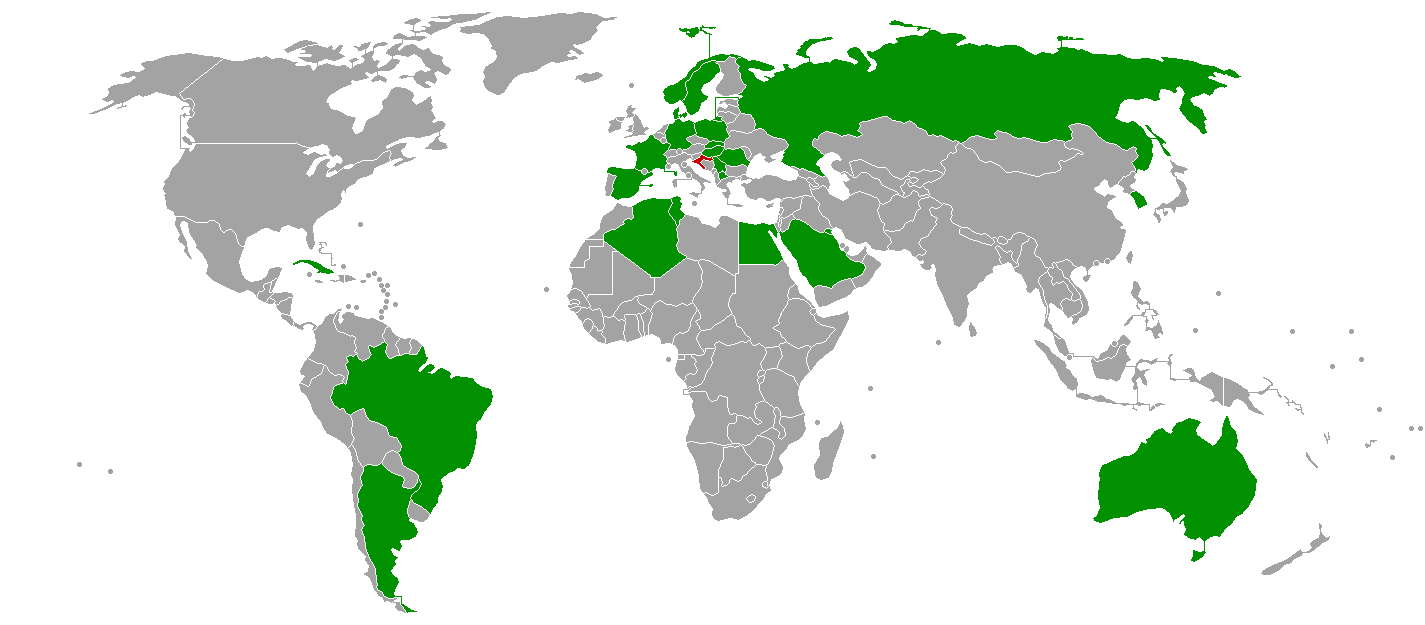
Qualified nations

Qualification occurred through the previous years' continental championships or qualifying tournaments:

- Host (1 vacancy)
- World Champion (1 vacancy)
- 2008 African Men's Handball Championship (3 vacancies)
- 2008 American Handball Championship (3 vacancies)
- 2008 Asian Handball Championship (3 vacancies)
- 2008 European Men's Handball Championship (3 vacancies)
- 2008 European qualifiers play-off (9 vacancies)
- 2008 Oceania qualifying tournament (1 vacancy)

=== European qualifiers play-off ===
Team 1	Agg.	Team 2	1st leg	2nd leg
Slovenia	62–63	Slovakia	33–33	29–30
Spain	63–56	Greece	32–24	31–32
Norway	61–52	Ukraine	29–22	32–30
Belarus	56–60	Russia	26–26	30–34
Montenegro	55–56	Romania	31–27	24–29
Czech Republic	62–62	Serbia	38–33	24–29
Poland	54–48	Switzerland	32–24	22–24
Hungary	54–49	Bosnia and Herzegovina	27–25	27–24
North Macedonia	58–56	Iceland	34–26	24–30

== Seeding ==
The draw for the groups of the preliminary round was held on 21 June 2008, in Zagreb. The draw took place at Zagreb's central Ban Jelačić Square and was hosted by Filip Brkić and Kristina Krepela.

Pot 1	Pot 2	Pot 3	Pot 4	Pot 5	Pot 6
Croatia (hosts); Germany (defending World Champions); Denmark (champions of Europe); France (3rd from Europe)	Sweden (5th from Europe); Norway (Euro playoff); Poland (Euro playoff); Hungary (Euro playoff)	Spain (Euro playoff); Slovakia (Euro playoff); North Macedonia (euro playoff); Egypt (champion of Africa)	Romania (Euro playoff); Russia (Euro playoff); South Korea (champions of Asia); Brazil (champions of America)	Serbia (Euro playoff); Tunisia (2nd from Africa); Kuwait (2nd from Asia); Argentina (2nd from America)	Australia (Oceania qualifiers); Algeria (3rd from Africa); Saudi Arabia (3rd from Asia); Cuba (3rd from America)

== Squads ==
Each nation had to submit a squad of 16 players.

== Referees ==
On 12 October 2008, the match officials for the tournament were confirmed. But due to injury, the Swedish referee couple Rickard Canbro and Mikael Claesson had to withdraw from the championship, and was replaced by Danish couple Per Olesen and Lars Ejby Pedersen.

Referees
Belarus	Andrei Gousko; Siarhei Repkin
Brazil	Jesus Nilson Aires Menezes; Rogério Aparecido Pinto
Croatia	Matija Gubica; Boris Milošević
Czech Republic	Jiří Opava; Pavěl Válek
Denmark	Martin Gjeding; Mads Hansen
Denmark	Per Olesen; Lars Ejby Pedersen
Egypt	Moustafa El-Moamli; Mohamed Shaaban
France	Nordine Lazaar; Laurent Reveret
Germany	Frank Lemme; Bernd Ullrich

Referees
Iran	Mohsen Karbaschi; Majid Kolahdouzan
Lithuania	Mindaugas Gatelis; Vaidas Mažeika
Poland	Mirosław Baum; Marek Góralczyk
Portugal	Ivan Caçador; Eurico Nicolau
Romania	Constantin Din; Sorin-Laurenţiu Dinu
Serbia	Zoran Stanojević; Slobodan Višekruna
Slovenia	Nenad Krstič; Peter Ljubič
Withdrawn due to injury
Sweden	Rickard Canbro; Mikael Claesson

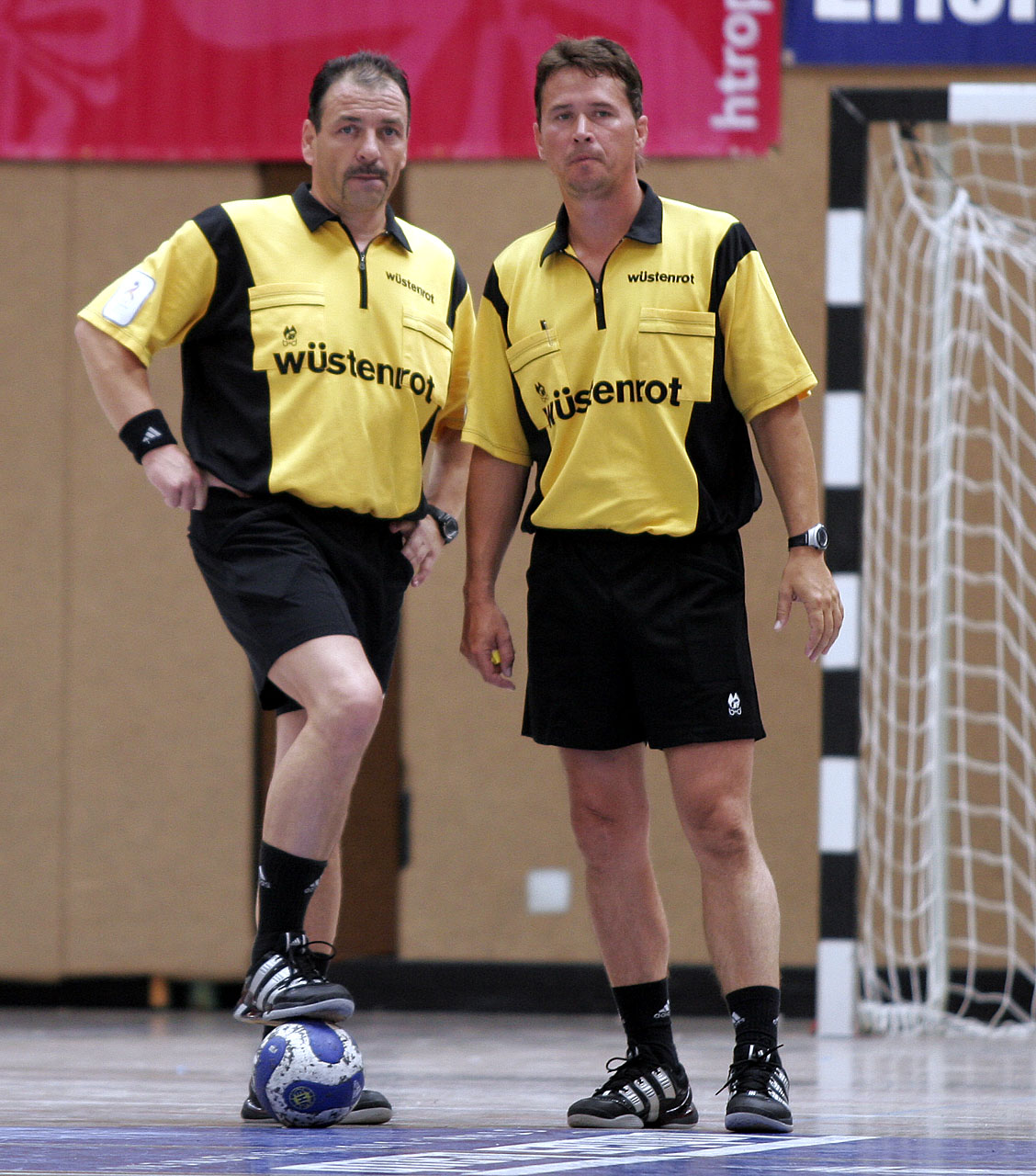
German officials Bernd Ullrich (left) and Frank Lemme (right) refereed the opening match between Croatia and South Korea on 16 January.

== Preliminary round ==
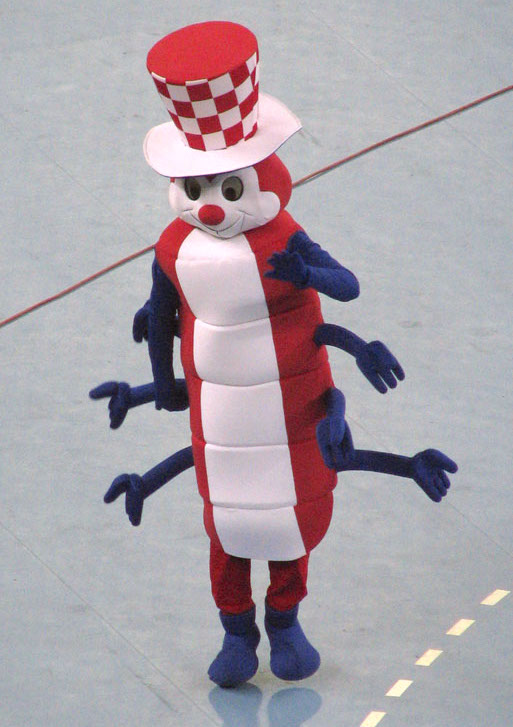
Ruksi, the caterpillar mascot.

All times are local UTC+1.

=== Group A ===
Pos	Team	Pld	W	D	L	GF	GA	GD	Pts	Qualification
1	France	5	5	0	0	168	106	+62	10	Main round
2	Slovakia	5	3	1	1	152	119	+33	7 (Note: Hungary 24–24 Slovakia)	Main round
3	Hungary	5	3	1	1	148	115	+33	7	Main round
4	Romania	5	2	0	3	141	135	+6	4	
5	Argentina	5	1	0	4	133	137	−4	2	
6	Australia	5	0	0	5	76	206	−130	0	

Source: IHF
Rules for classification: 1) points; 2) head-to-head points; 3) head-to-head goal difference; 4) head-to-head number of goals scored; 5) goal difference.
Notes:

17 January 2009; 16:30	Slovakia	27–25	Argentina	Gradski vrt Hall, Osijek; Attendance: 3,000; Referees: Olesen, Pedersen (DEN)
17 January 2009; 16:30	Straňovský 7	(12–13)	Gull 5	Gradski vrt Hall, Osijek; Attendance: 3,000; Referees: Olesen, Pedersen (DEN)
17 January 2009; 16:30	3× (yellow card) 7× (suspension)	Report	3× (yellow card) 6× (suspension)	Gradski vrt Hall, Osijek; Attendance: 3,000; Referees: Olesen, Pedersen (DEN)

17 January 2009; 18:30	Hungary	41–17	Australia	Gradski vrt Hall, Osijek; Attendance: 3,000; Referees: Karbaschi, Kolahdouzan (IRI)
17 January 2009; 18:30	Iváncsik, Zubai 7	(20–8)	Fletcher 8	Gradski vrt Hall, Osijek; Attendance: 3,000; Referees: Karbaschi, Kolahdouzan (IRI)
17 January 2009; 18:30	3× (yellow card) 3× (suspension)	Report	3× (yellow card) 1× (suspension)	Gradski vrt Hall, Osijek; Attendance: 3,000; Referees: Karbaschi, Kolahdouzan (IRI)

17 January 2009; 20:30	France	31–21	Romania	Gradski vrt Hall, Osijek; Attendance: 3,000; Referees: Stanojević, Višekruna (SRB)
17 January 2009; 20:30	Guigou, Karabatić 7	(12–9)	Toma 5	Gradski vrt Hall, Osijek; Attendance: 3,000; Referees: Stanojević, Višekruna (SRB)
17 January 2009; 20:30	3× (yellow card) 3× (suspension)	Report	3× (yellow card) 2× (suspension)	Gradski vrt Hall, Osijek; Attendance: 3,000; Referees: Stanojević, Višekruna (SRB)

18 January 2009; 15:00	Australia	12–47	Slovakia	Gradski vrt Hall, Osijek; Attendance: 1,500; Referees: Stanojević, Višekruna (SRB)
18 January 2009; 15:00	Fletcher 6	(6–20)	Antl 8	Gradski vrt Hall, Osijek; Attendance: 1,500; Referees: Stanojević, Višekruna (SRB)
18 January 2009; 15:00	3× (yellow card) 4× (suspension)	Report	3× (yellow card) 2× (suspension)	Gradski vrt Hall, Osijek; Attendance: 1,500; Referees: Stanojević, Višekruna (SRB)

18 January 2009; 17:00	Romania	27–30	Hungary	Gradski vrt Hall, Osijek; Attendance: 3,000; Referees: Olesen, Pedersen (DEN)
18 January 2009; 17:00	Pîrîianu 6	(16–13)	Nagy 8	Gradski vrt Hall, Osijek; Attendance: 3,000; Referees: Olesen, Pedersen (DEN)
18 January 2009; 17:00	3× (yellow card) 1× (suspension)	Report	3× (yellow card) 5× (suspension)	Gradski vrt Hall, Osijek; Attendance: 3,000; Referees: Olesen, Pedersen (DEN)

18 January 2009; 19:00	Argentina	26–33	France	Gradski vrt Hall, Osijek; Attendance: 2,500; Referees: Gubica, Milošević (CRO)
18 January 2009; 19:00	Kogovsek, Migueles 5	(15–19)	Guigou 7	Gradski vrt Hall, Osijek; Attendance: 2,500; Referees: Gubica, Milošević (CRO)
18 January 2009; 19:00	3× (yellow card) 2× (suspension)	Report	3× (yellow card) 1× (suspension)	Gradski vrt Hall, Osijek; Attendance: 2,500; Referees: Gubica, Milošević (CRO)

19 January 2009; 15:30	Romania	30–26	Argentina	Gradski vrt Hall, Osijek; Attendance: 1,500; Referees: Karbaschi, Kolahdouzan (IRI)
19 January 2009; 15:30	Ghionea 9	(15–13)	Kogovsek 7	Gradski vrt Hall, Osijek; Attendance: 1,500; Referees: Karbaschi, Kolahdouzan (IRI)
19 January 2009; 15:30	3× (yellow card) 4× (suspension)	Report	3× (yellow card) 5× (suspension) 1× (red card)	Gradski vrt Hall, Osijek; Attendance: 1,500; Referees: Karbaschi, Kolahdouzan (IRI)

19 January 2009; 17:30	Hungary	24–24	Slovakia	Gradski vrt Hall, Osijek; Attendance: 2,500; Referees: Gubica, Milošević (CRO)
19 January 2009; 17:30	three players 5	(12–6)	Šulc 9	Gradski vrt Hall, Osijek; Attendance: 2,500; Referees: Gubica, Milošević (CRO)
19 January 2009; 17:30	3× (yellow card) 3× (suspension)	Report	4× (yellow card) 3× (suspension)	Gradski vrt Hall, Osijek; Attendance: 2,500; Referees: Gubica, Milošević (CRO)

19 January 2009; 19:30	France	42–11	Australia	Gradski vrt Hall, Osijek; Attendance: 1,500; Referees: Olesen, Pedersen (DEN)
19 January 2009; 19:30	Abalo 10	(20–3)	Fletcher 4	Gradski vrt Hall, Osijek; Attendance: 1,500; Referees: Olesen, Pedersen (DEN)
19 January 2009; 19:30	2× (yellow card)	Report	3× (yellow card) 4× (suspension)	Gradski vrt Hall, Osijek; Attendance: 1,500; Referees: Olesen, Pedersen (DEN)

21 January 2009; 15:00	Australia	20–40	Romania	Gradski vrt Hall, Osijek; Attendance: 1,000; Referees: Gubica, Milošević (CRO)
21 January 2009; 15:00	Blondell 8	(9–21)	Cozma 10	Gradski vrt Hall, Osijek; Attendance: 1,000; Referees: Gubica, Milošević (CRO)
21 January 2009; 15:00	3× (yellow card) 2× (suspension)	Report	2× (yellow card) 3× (suspension)	Gradski vrt Hall, Osijek; Attendance: 1,000; Referees: Gubica, Milošević (CRO)

21 January 2009; 17:00	Hungary	31–20	Argentina	Gradski vrt Hall, Osijek; Attendance: 3,000; Referees: Stanojević, Višekruna (SRB)
21 January 2009; 17:00	Mocsai 6	(17–8)	Kogovsek, Gull 4	Gradski vrt Hall, Osijek; Attendance: 3,000; Referees: Stanojević, Višekruna (SRB)
21 January 2009; 17:00	3× (yellow card) 3× (suspension)	Report	3× (yellow card) 2× (suspension)	Gradski vrt Hall, Osijek; Attendance: 3,000; Referees: Stanojević, Višekruna (SRB)

21 January 2009; 19:00	Slovakia	26–35	France	Gradski vrt Hall, Osijek; Attendance: 2,500; Referees: Karbaschi, Kolahdouzan (IRI)
21 January 2009; 19:00	Antl 7	(9–15)	Karabatić 9	Gradski vrt Hall, Osijek; Attendance: 2,500; Referees: Karbaschi, Kolahdouzan (IRI)
21 January 2009; 19:00	4× (yellow card) 7× (suspension)	Report	3× (yellow card) 2× (suspension)	Gradski vrt Hall, Osijek; Attendance: 2,500; Referees: Karbaschi, Kolahdouzan (IRI)

22 January 2009; 15:00	Argentina	36–16	Australia	Gradski vrt Hall, Osijek; Attendance: 1,000; Referees: Gubica, Milošević (CRO)
22 January 2009; 15:00	Torres 7	(15–8)	Fletcher 4	Gradski vrt Hall, Osijek; Attendance: 1,000; Referees: Gubica, Milošević (CRO)
22 January 2009; 15:00	2× (yellow card) 3× (suspension)	Report	3× (yellow card) 1× (suspension)	Gradski vrt Hall, Osijek; Attendance: 1,000; Referees: Gubica, Milošević (CRO)

22 January 2009; 17:00	Slovakia	28–23	Romania	Gradski vrt Hall, Osijek; Attendance: 3,500; Referees: Olesen, Pedersen (DEN)
22 January 2009; 17:00	Kukučka 8	(12–13)	Ghionea, Pîrîianu 5	Gradski vrt Hall, Osijek; Attendance: 3,500; Referees: Olesen, Pedersen (DEN)
22 January 2009; 17:00	3× (yellow card) 4× (suspension)	Report	3× (yellow card) 4× (suspension)	Gradski vrt Hall, Osijek; Attendance: 3,500; Referees: Olesen, Pedersen (DEN)

22 January 2009; 19:00	France	27–22	Hungary	Gradski vrt Hall, Osijek; Attendance: 3,500; Referees: Stanojević, Višekruna (SRB)
22 January 2009; 19:00	three players 5	(13–8)	Gál 5	Gradski vrt Hall, Osijek; Attendance: 3,500; Referees: Stanojević, Višekruna (SRB)
22 January 2009; 19:00	3× (yellow card)	Report	3× (yellow card) 1× (suspension)	Gradski vrt Hall, Osijek; Attendance: 3,500; Referees: Stanojević, Višekruna (SRB)

=== Group B ===
Pos	Team	Pld	W	D	L	GF	GA	GD	Pts	Qualification
1	Croatia (H)	5	5	0	0	170	115	+55	10	Main round
2	Sweden	5	4	0	1	162	118	+44	8	Main round
3	South Korea	5	3	0	2	140	126	+14	6	Main round
4	Spain	5	2	0	3	167	127	+40	4	
5	Cuba	5	1	0	4	106	181	−75	2	
6	Kuwait	5	0	0	5	99	177	−78	0	

Source: IHF
Rules for classification: 1) points; 2) head-to-head points; 3) head-to-head goal difference; 4) head-to-head number of goals scored; 5) goal difference.
(H) Hosts

16 January 2009; 20:30	Croatia	27–26	South Korea	Spaladium Arena, Split; Attendance: 12,000; Referees: Lemme, Ullrich (GER)
16 January 2009; 20:30	Čupić 8	(14–13)	Park J., Sim 5	Spaladium Arena, Split; Attendance: 12,000; Referees: Lemme, Ullrich (GER)
16 January 2009; 20:30	3× (yellow card) 2× (suspension)	Report	3× (yellow card) 4× (suspension)	Spaladium Arena, Split; Attendance: 12,000; Referees: Lemme, Ullrich (GER)

17 January 2009; 16:30	Spain	47–17	Kuwait	Spaladium Arena, Split; Attendance: 8,000; Referees: Menezes, Pinto (BRA)
17 January 2009; 16:30	García, Rocas 7	(18–9)	H. Al-Shamari 5	Spaladium Arena, Split; Attendance: 8,000; Referees: Menezes, Pinto (BRA)
17 January 2009; 16:30	3× (yellow card) 3× (suspension)	Report	3× (yellow card) 4× (suspension)	Spaladium Arena, Split; Attendance: 8,000; Referees: Menezes, Pinto (BRA)

17 January 2009; 18:30	Sweden	41–14	Cuba	Spaladium Arena, Split; Attendance: 3,500; Referees: El-Moamli, Shaaban (EGY)
17 January 2009; 18:30	Källman, Lennartsson 6	(19–7)	Díaz 5	Spaladium Arena, Split; Attendance: 3,500; Referees: El-Moamli, Shaaban (EGY)
17 January 2009; 18:30	3× (yellow card) 6× (suspension)	Report	3× (yellow card) 4× (suspension)	Spaladium Arena, Split; Attendance: 3,500; Referees: El-Moamli, Shaaban (EGY)

18 January 2009; 16:30	Cuba	20–45	Spain	Spaladium Arena, Split; Attendance: 1,000; Referees: Menezes, Pinto (BRA)
18 January 2009; 16:30	Echevarría 5	(10–24)	García 9	Spaladium Arena, Split; Attendance: 1,000; Referees: Menezes, Pinto (BRA)
18 January 2009; 16:30	2× (yellow card) 8× (suspension) 1× (red card)	Report	3× (yellow card) 4× (suspension)	Spaladium Arena, Split; Attendance: 1,000; Referees: Menezes, Pinto (BRA)

18 January 2009; 18:30	South Korea	25–31	Sweden	Spaladium Arena, Split; Attendance: 3,000; Referees: Din, Dinu (ROU)
18 January 2009; 18:30	Lee J., Park J. 6	(12–16)	Källman 10	Spaladium Arena, Split; Attendance: 3,000; Referees: Din, Dinu (ROU)
18 January 2009; 18:30	4× (yellow card) 4× (suspension)	Report	4× (yellow card) 10× (suspension) 1× (red card)	Spaladium Arena, Split; Attendance: 3,000; Referees: Din, Dinu (ROU)

18 January 2009; 20:30	Kuwait	21–40	Croatia	Spaladium Arena, Split; Attendance: 10,000; Referees: El-Moamli, Shaaban (EGY)
18 January 2009; 20:30	Al-Gharaballi, Al-Qallaf 5	(13–22)	Šprem 8	Spaladium Arena, Split; Attendance: 10,000; Referees: El-Moamli, Shaaban (EGY)
18 January 2009; 20:30	2× (yellow card) 9× (suspension) 1× (red card)	Report	2× (yellow card) 5× (suspension)	Spaladium Arena, Split; Attendance: 10,000; Referees: El-Moamli, Shaaban (EGY)

19 January 2009; 16:30	South Korea	34–19	Kuwait	Spaladium Arena, Split; Attendance: 1,000; Referees: Din, Dinu (ROU)
19 January 2009; 16:30	Yoon 7	(15–9)	five players 3	Spaladium Arena, Split; Attendance: 1,000; Referees: Din, Dinu (ROU)
19 January 2009; 16:30	3× (yellow card) 3× (suspension)	Report	3× (yellow card) 4× (suspension)	Spaladium Arena, Split; Attendance: 1,000; Referees: Din, Dinu (ROU)

19 January 2009; 18:30	Sweden	34–30	Spain	Spaladium Arena, Split; Attendance: 5,000; Referees: Lemme, Ullrich (GER)
19 January 2009; 18:30	Doder 11	(19–13)	Romero 11	Spaladium Arena, Split; Attendance: 5,000; Referees: Lemme, Ullrich (GER)
19 January 2009; 18:30	4× (yellow card) 7× (suspension)	Report	3× (yellow card) 3× (suspension)	Spaladium Arena, Split; Attendance: 5,000; Referees: Lemme, Ullrich (GER)

19 January 2009; 20:30	Croatia	41–20	Cuba	Spaladium Arena, Split; Attendance: 11,800; Referees: Menezes, Pinto (BRA)
19 January 2009; 20:30	Čupić 11	(20–9)	Carol, Echevarría 5	Spaladium Arena, Split; Attendance: 11,800; Referees: Menezes, Pinto (BRA)
19 January 2009; 20:30	2× (yellow card) 2× (suspension)	Report	2× (yellow card) 7× (suspension)	Spaladium Arena, Split; Attendance: 11,800; Referees: Menezes, Pinto (BRA)

21 January 2009; 16:30	Cuba	26–31	South Korea	Spaladium Arena, Split; Attendance: 500; Referees: Lemme, Ullrich (GER)
21 January 2009; 16:30	five players 4	(13–17)	Lee J. 10	Spaladium Arena, Split; Attendance: 500; Referees: Lemme, Ullrich (GER)
21 January 2009; 16:30	2× (yellow card) 10× (suspension)	Report	3× (yellow card) 4× (suspension)	Spaladium Arena, Split; Attendance: 500; Referees: Lemme, Ullrich (GER)

21 January 2009; 18:30	Sweden	30–19	Kuwait	Spaladium Arena, Split; Attendance: 6,000; Referees: El-Moamli, Shaaban (EGY)
21 January 2009; 18:30	Larholm 6	(17–9)	Al-Hajeri 5	Spaladium Arena, Split; Attendance: 6,000; Referees: El-Moamli, Shaaban (EGY)
21 January 2009; 18:30	3× (yellow card) 4× (suspension)	Report	2× (yellow card) 2× (suspension)	Spaladium Arena, Split; Attendance: 6,000; Referees: El-Moamli, Shaaban (EGY)

21 January 2009; 20:30	Spain	22–32	Croatia	Spaladium Arena, Split; Attendance: 12,000; Referees: Din, Dinu (ROU)
21 January 2009; 20:30	Romero 5	(11–18)	Duvnjak 7	Spaladium Arena, Split; Attendance: 12,000; Referees: Din, Dinu (ROU)
21 January 2009; 20:30	4× (yellow card) 2× (suspension)	Report	4× (yellow card) 8× (suspension)	Spaladium Arena, Split; Attendance: 12,000; Referees: Din, Dinu (ROU)

22 January 2009; 16:30	Kuwait	23–26	Cuba	Spaladium Arena, Split; Attendance: 500; Referees: Menezes, Pinto (BRA)
22 January 2009; 16:30	F. Al-Shamari, H. Al-Shamari 5	(9–12)	Carol 8	Spaladium Arena, Split; Attendance: 500; Referees: Menezes, Pinto (BRA)
22 January 2009; 16:30	4× (yellow card) 5× (suspension)	Report	3× (yellow card) 6× (suspension)	Spaladium Arena, Split; Attendance: 500; Referees: Menezes, Pinto (BRA)

22 January 2009; 18:30	Spain	23–24	South Korea	Spaladium Arena, Split; Attendance: 8,000; Referees: Din, Dinu (ROU)
22 January 2009; 18:30	Rocas, Romero 5	(15–14)	Oh Y. 6	Spaladium Arena, Split; Attendance: 8,000; Referees: Din, Dinu (ROU)
22 January 2009; 18:30	3× (yellow card) 1× (suspension)	Report	4× (yellow card) 4× (suspension)	Spaladium Arena, Split; Attendance: 8,000; Referees: Din, Dinu (ROU)

22 January 2009; 20:30	Croatia	30–26	Sweden	Spaladium Arena, Split; Attendance: 12,000; Referees: Lemme, Ullrich (GER)
22 January 2009; 20:30	Čupić 8	(14–13)	Doder, Larholm 7	Spaladium Arena, Split; Attendance: 12,000; Referees: Lemme, Ullrich (GER)
22 January 2009; 20:30	4× (yellow card) 4× (suspension)	Report	4× (yellow card) 5× (suspension)	Spaladium Arena, Split; Attendance: 12,000; Referees: Lemme, Ullrich (GER)

=== Group C ===
Pos	Team	Pld	W	D	L	GF	GA	GD	Pts	Qualification
1	Germany	5	4	1	0	147	116	+31	9	Main round
2	North Macedonia	5	3	0	2	145	136	+9	6 (Note: Poland 29–30 North Macedonia)	Main round
3	Poland	5	3	0	2	146	131	+15	6	Main round
4	Russia	5	2	1	2	143	145	−2	5	
5	Tunisia	5	2	0	3	143	142	+1	4	
6	Algeria	5	0	0	5	114	168	−54	0	

Source: IHF
Rules for classification: 1) points; 2) head-to-head points; 3) head-to-head goal difference; 4) head-to-head number of goals scored; 5) goal difference.
Notes:

17 January 2009; 15:30	Poland	39–22	Algeria	Varaždin Arena, Varaždin; Attendance: 3,500; Referees: Opava, Válek (CZE)
17 January 2009; 15:30	Jurasik, Tłuczyński 6	(17–8)	Chehbour 6	Varaždin Arena, Varaždin; Attendance: 3,500; Referees: Opava, Válek (CZE)
17 January 2009; 15:30	3× (yellow card) 3× (suspension)	Report	3× (yellow card) 7× (suspension)	Varaždin Arena, Varaždin; Attendance: 3,500; Referees: Opava, Válek (CZE)

17 January 2009; 17:30	Germany	26–26	Russia	Varaždin Arena, Varaždin; Attendance: 4,600; Referees: Gjeding, Hansen (DEN)
17 January 2009; 17:30	Hens 9	(15–14)	Igropulo, Rastvortsev 5	Varaždin Arena, Varaždin; Attendance: 4,600; Referees: Gjeding, Hansen (DEN)
17 January 2009; 17:30	3× (yellow card) 5× (suspension)	Report	3× (yellow card) 9× (suspension)	Varaždin Arena, Varaždin; Attendance: 4,600; Referees: Gjeding, Hansen (DEN)

17 January 2009; 19:30	North Macedonia	24–25	Tunisia	Varaždin Arena, Varaždin; Attendance: 3,500; Referees: Caçador, Nicolau (POR)
17 January 2009; 19:30	K. Lazarov 9	(14–13)	Tej 6	Varaždin Arena, Varaždin; Attendance: 3,500; Referees: Caçador, Nicolau (POR)
17 January 2009; 19:30	3× (yellow card) 1× (suspension)	Report	4× (yellow card) 4× (suspension) 1× (red card)	Varaždin Arena, Varaždin; Attendance: 3,500; Referees: Caçador, Nicolau (POR)

18 January 2009; 15:30	Algeria	19–32	North Macedonia	Varaždin Arena, Varaždin; Attendance: 2,000; Referees: Gjeding, Hansen (DEN)
18 January 2009; 15:30	Chehbour 6	(8–16)	K. Lazarov 9	Varaždin Arena, Varaždin; Attendance: 2,000; Referees: Gjeding, Hansen (DEN)
18 January 2009; 15:30	3× (yellow card) 4× (suspension)	Report	3× (yellow card) 4× (suspension)	Varaždin Arena, Varaždin; Attendance: 2,000; Referees: Gjeding, Hansen (DEN)

18 January 2009; 17:30	Tunisia	24–26	Germany	Varaždin Arena, Varaždin; Attendance: 3,500; Referees: Opava, Válek (CZE)
18 January 2009; 17:30	Hammed 9	(12–12)	Hens 6	Varaždin Arena, Varaždin; Attendance: 3,500; Referees: Opava, Válek (CZE)
18 January 2009; 17:30	2× (yellow card) 7× (suspension) 1× (red card)	Report	3× (yellow card) 6× (suspension)	Varaždin Arena, Varaždin; Attendance: 3,500; Referees: Opava, Válek (CZE)

18 January 2009; 19:30	Russia	22–24	Poland	Varaždin Arena, Varaždin; Attendance: 3,000; Referees: Krstič, Ljubič (SLO)
18 January 2009; 19:30	Igropulo 6	(14–11)	three players 4	Varaždin Arena, Varaždin; Attendance: 3,000; Referees: Krstič, Ljubič (SLO)
18 January 2009; 19:30	3× (yellow card) 10× (suspension) 2× (red card)	Report	4× (yellow card) 7× (suspension)	Varaždin Arena, Varaždin; Attendance: 3,000; Referees: Krstič, Ljubič (SLO)

19 January 2009; 15:30	Poland	29–30	North Macedonia	Varaždin Arena, Varaždin; Attendance: 1,500; Referees: Caçador, Nicolau (POR)
19 January 2009; 15:30	Bielecki, M. Lijewski 7	(15–16)	K. Lazarov 13	Varaždin Arena, Varaždin; Attendance: 1,500; Referees: Caçador, Nicolau (POR)
19 January 2009; 15:30	3× (yellow card) 4× (suspension)	Report	4× (yellow card) 4× (suspension)	Varaždin Arena, Varaždin; Attendance: 1,500; Referees: Caçador, Nicolau (POR)

19 January 2009; 17:30	Germany	32–20	Algeria	Varaždin Arena, Varaždin; Attendance: 1,500; Referees: Krstič, Ljubič (SLO)
19 January 2009; 17:30	Jansen 6	(16–10)	Berriah 8	Varaždin Arena, Varaždin; Attendance: 1,500; Referees: Krstič, Ljubič (SLO)
19 January 2009; 17:30	4× (yellow card) 6× (suspension)	Report	4× (yellow card) 4× (suspension)	Varaždin Arena, Varaždin; Attendance: 1,500; Referees: Krstič, Ljubič (SLO)

19 January 2009; 19:30	Russia	36–31	Tunisia	Varaždin Arena, Varaždin; Attendance: 1,000; Referees: Gjeding, Hansen (DEN)
19 January 2009; 19:30	Filippov, Kovalyov 7	(16–11)	Touati 9	Varaždin Arena, Varaždin; Attendance: 1,000; Referees: Gjeding, Hansen (DEN)
19 January 2009; 19:30	2× (yellow card) 7× (suspension) 1× (red card)	Report	3× (yellow card) 4× (suspension)	Varaždin Arena, Varaždin; Attendance: 1,000; Referees: Gjeding, Hansen (DEN)

21 January 2009; 15:30	Algeria	28–29	Russia	Varaždin Arena, Varaždin; Attendance: 2,000; Referees: Caçador, Nicolau (POR)
21 January 2009; 15:30	Boudrali 6	(14–17)	Filippov 9	Varaždin Arena, Varaždin; Attendance: 2,000; Referees: Caçador, Nicolau (POR)
21 January 2009; 15:30	3× (yellow card) 3× (suspension)	Report	3× (yellow card) 3× (suspension)	Varaždin Arena, Varaždin; Attendance: 2,000; Referees: Caçador, Nicolau (POR)

21 January 2009; 17:30	North Macedonia	23–33	Germany	Varaždin Arena, Varaždin; Attendance: 3,800; Referees: Opava, Válek (CZE)
21 January 2009; 17:30	K. Lazarov 9	(14–13)	Glandorf 9	Varaždin Arena, Varaždin; Attendance: 3,800; Referees: Opava, Válek (CZE)
21 January 2009; 17:30	3× (yellow card) 6× (suspension) 1× (red card)	Report	3× (yellow card) 7× (suspension) 1× (red card)	Varaždin Arena, Varaždin; Attendance: 3,800; Referees: Opava, Válek (CZE)

21 January 2009; 19:30	Poland	31–27	Tunisia	Varaždin Arena, Varaždin; Attendance: 800; Referees: Krstič, Ljubič (SLO)
21 January 2009; 19:30	Tłuczyński 11	(16–11)	Hedoui 6	Varaždin Arena, Varaždin; Attendance: 800; Referees: Krstič, Ljubič (SLO)
21 January 2009; 19:30	3× (yellow card) 3× (suspension)	Report	4× (yellow card) 9× (suspension) 1× (red card)	Varaždin Arena, Varaždin; Attendance: 800; Referees: Krstič, Ljubič (SLO)

22 January 2009; 15:30	North Macedonia	36–30	Russia	Varaždin Arena, Varaždin; Attendance: 4,000; Referees: Gjeding, Hansen (DEN)
22 January 2009; 15:30	K. Lazarov 13	(15–14)	Igropulo 13	Varaždin Arena, Varaždin; Attendance: 4,000; Referees: Gjeding, Hansen (DEN)
22 January 2009; 15:30	3× (yellow card) 10× (suspension) 1× (red card)	Report	3× (yellow card) 7× (suspension)	Varaždin Arena, Varaždin; Attendance: 4,000; Referees: Gjeding, Hansen (DEN)

22 January 2009; 17:30	Germany	30–23	Poland	Varaždin Arena, Varaždin; Attendance: 4,000; Referees: Caçador, Nicolau (POR)
22 January 2009; 17:30	Kraus 7	(14–11)	Tłuczyński 6	Varaždin Arena, Varaždin; Attendance: 4,000; Referees: Caçador, Nicolau (POR)
22 January 2009; 17:30	3× (yellow card) 9× (suspension) 1× (red card)	Report	4× (yellow card) 5× (suspension)	Varaždin Arena, Varaždin; Attendance: 4,000; Referees: Caçador, Nicolau (POR)

22 January 2009; 19:30	Tunisia	36–25	Algeria	Varaždin Arena, Varaždin; Attendance: 300; Referees: Opava, Válek (CZE)
22 January 2009; 19:30	Touati 12	(18–11)	Bouakaz 5	Varaždin Arena, Varaždin; Attendance: 300; Referees: Opava, Válek (CZE)
22 January 2009; 19:30	3× (yellow card) 3× (suspension)	Report	2× (yellow card) 9× (suspension) 1× (red card)	Varaždin Arena, Varaždin; Attendance: 300; Referees: Opava, Válek (CZE)

=== Group D ===
Pos	Team	Pld	W	D	L	GF	GA	GD	Pts	Qualification
1	Denmark	5	5	0	0	167	121	+46	10	Main round
2	Serbia	5	3	0	2	161	146	+15	6 (Note: Norway 26–27 Serbia)	Main round
3	Norway	5	3	0	2	162	123	+39	6	Main round
4	Egypt	5	2	0	3	110	126	−16	4 (Note: Egypt 25–22 Brazil)	
5	Brazil	5	2	0	3	128	158	−30	4	
6	Saudi Arabia	5	0	0	5	107	161	−54	0	

Source: IHF
Rules for classification: 1) points; 2) head-to-head points; 3) head-to-head goal difference; 4) head-to-head number of goals scored; 5) goal difference.
Notes:

17 January 2009; 16:15	Norway	39–23	Saudi Arabia	Žatika Sport Centre, Poreč; Attendance: 2,000; Referees: Gatelis, Mažeika (LTU)
17 January 2009; 16:15	Mamelund 8	(19–10)	B. Al-Harbi 6	Žatika Sport Centre, Poreč; Attendance: 2,000; Referees: Gatelis, Mažeika (LTU)
17 January 2009; 16:15	3× (yellow card) 3× (suspension)	Report	3× (yellow card) 7× (suspension)	Žatika Sport Centre, Poreč; Attendance: 2,000; Referees: Gatelis, Mažeika (LTU)

17 January 2009; 18:15	Egypt	22–30	Serbia	Žatika Sport Centre, Poreč; Attendance: 2,500; Referees: Baum, Góralczyk (POL)
17 January 2009; 18:15	El Ahmar 8	(12–12)	Stojanović 6	Žatika Sport Centre, Poreč; Attendance: 2,500; Referees: Baum, Góralczyk (POL)
17 January 2009; 18:15	5× (yellow card) 6× (suspension)	Report	3× (yellow card) 5× (suspension)	Žatika Sport Centre, Poreč; Attendance: 2,500; Referees: Baum, Góralczyk (POL)

17 January 2009; 20:15	Denmark	40–27	Brazil	Žatika Sport Centre, Poreč; Attendance: 2,200; Referees: Gousko, Repkin (BLR)
17 January 2009; 20:15	Christiansen 8	(19–12)	F. Silva 6	Žatika Sport Centre, Poreč; Attendance: 2,200; Referees: Gousko, Repkin (BLR)
17 January 2009; 20:15	3× (yellow card) 2× (suspension)	Report	3× (yellow card) 5× (suspension)	Žatika Sport Centre, Poreč; Attendance: 2,200; Referees: Gousko, Repkin (BLR)

18 January 2009; 16:15	Brazil	21–39	Norway	Žatika Sport Centre, Poreč; Attendance: 1,500; Referees: Baum, Góralczyk (POL)
18 January 2009; 16:15	Hubner, F. Silva 4	(8–17)	Bjørnsen 7	Žatika Sport Centre, Poreč; Attendance: 1,500; Referees: Baum, Góralczyk (POL)
18 January 2009; 16:15	3× (yellow card) 4× (suspension)	Report	3× (yellow card) 3× (suspension)	Žatika Sport Centre, Poreč; Attendance: 1,500; Referees: Baum, Góralczyk (POL)

18 January 2009; 18:15	Saudi Arabia	18–26	Egypt	Žatika Sport Centre, Poreč; Attendance: 1,500; Referees: Lazaar, Reveret (FRA)
18 January 2009; 18:15	B. Al-Harbi 9	(8–12)	Zaky 7	Žatika Sport Centre, Poreč; Attendance: 1,500; Referees: Lazaar, Reveret (FRA)
18 January 2009; 18:15	3× (yellow card) 6× (suspension)	Report	4× (yellow card) 3× (suspension)	Žatika Sport Centre, Poreč; Attendance: 1,500; Referees: Lazaar, Reveret (FRA)

18 January 2009; 20:15	Serbia	36–37	Denmark	Žatika Sport Centre, Poreč; Attendance: 3,500; Referees: Gousko, Repkin (BLR)
18 January 2009; 20:15	Ilić 10	(22–16)	Lindberg 8	Žatika Sport Centre, Poreč; Attendance: 3,500; Referees: Gousko, Repkin (BLR)
18 January 2009; 20:15	3× (yellow card) 8× (suspension)	Report	2× (yellow card) 4× (suspension)	Žatika Sport Centre, Poreč; Attendance: 3,500; Referees: Gousko, Repkin (BLR)

19 January 2009; 17:00	Brazil	32–30	Serbia	Žatika Sport Centre, Poreč; Attendance: 1,000; Referees: Lazaar, Reveret (FRA)
19 January 2009; 17:00	Ribeiro 10	(14–14)	Ilić 7	Žatika Sport Centre, Poreč; Attendance: 1,000; Referees: Lazaar, Reveret (FRA)
19 January 2009; 17:00	3× (yellow card) 2× (suspension)	Report	3× (yellow card) 2× (suspension)	Žatika Sport Centre, Poreč; Attendance: 1,000; Referees: Lazaar, Reveret (FRA)

19 January 2009; 19:10	Norway	30–20	Egypt	Žatika Sport Centre, Poreč; Attendance: 1,650; Referees: Gatelis, Mažeika (LTU)
19 January 2009; 19:10	Kjelling 9	(14–10)	Zaky 9	Žatika Sport Centre, Poreč; Attendance: 1,650; Referees: Gatelis, Mažeika (LTU)
19 January 2009; 19:10	3× (yellow card) 2× (suspension)	Report	3× (yellow card) 6× (suspension)	Žatika Sport Centre, Poreč; Attendance: 1,650; Referees: Gatelis, Mažeika (LTU)

19 January 2009; 21:15	Denmark	32–13	Saudi Arabia	Žatika Sport Centre, Poreč; Attendance: 800; Referees: Baum, Góralczyk (POL)
19 January 2009; 21:15	Eggert 10	(17–4)	Al-Habib 6	Žatika Sport Centre, Poreč; Attendance: 800; Referees: Baum, Góralczyk (POL)
19 January 2009; 21:15	3× (yellow card) 1× (suspension)	Report	3× (yellow card) 2× (suspension)	Žatika Sport Centre, Poreč; Attendance: 800; Referees: Baum, Góralczyk (POL)

21 January 2009; 17:00	Saudi Arabia	24–26	Brazil	Žatika Sport Centre, Poreč; Attendance: 1,000; Referees: Gatelis, Mažeika (LTU)
21 January 2009; 17:00	B. Al-Harbi 9	(10–14)	Ribeiro 9	Žatika Sport Centre, Poreč; Attendance: 1,000; Referees: Gatelis, Mažeika (LTU)
21 January 2009; 17:00	3× (yellow card) 2× (suspension)	Report	3× (yellow card) 6× (suspension) 1× (red card)	Žatika Sport Centre, Poreč; Attendance: 1,000; Referees: Gatelis, Mažeika (LTU)

21 January 2009; 19:10	Norway	26–27	Serbia	Žatika Sport Centre, Poreč; Attendance: 3,500; Referees: Baum, Góralczyk (POL)
21 January 2009; 19:10	Løke 6	(10–12)	Vujin 6	Žatika Sport Centre, Poreč; Attendance: 3,500; Referees: Baum, Góralczyk (POL)
21 January 2009; 19:10	4× (yellow card) 2× (suspension)	Report	3× (yellow card) 5× (suspension)	Žatika Sport Centre, Poreč; Attendance: 3,500; Referees: Baum, Góralczyk (POL)

21 January 2009; 21:15	Egypt	17–26	Denmark	Žatika Sport Centre, Poreč; Attendance: 1,200; Referees: Lazaar, Reveret (FRA)
21 January 2009; 21:15	Zaky 4	(7–12)	Christiansen 7	Žatika Sport Centre, Poreč; Attendance: 1,200; Referees: Lazaar, Reveret (FRA)
21 January 2009; 21:15	3× (yellow card) 4× (suspension)	Report	3× (yellow card) 3× (suspension)	Žatika Sport Centre, Poreč; Attendance: 1,200; Referees: Lazaar, Reveret (FRA)

22 January 2009; 16:15	Serbia	38–29	Saudi Arabia	Žatika Sport Centre, Poreč; Attendance: 800; Referees: Gatelis, Mažeika (LTU)
22 January 2009; 16:15	Bojinović, Marković 6	(21–13)	Al-Habib 6	Žatika Sport Centre, Poreč; Attendance: 800; Referees: Gatelis, Mažeika (LTU)
22 January 2009; 16:15	3× (yellow card)	Report	3× (yellow card) 6× (suspension)	Žatika Sport Centre, Poreč; Attendance: 800; Referees: Gatelis, Mažeika (LTU)

22 January 2009; 18:15	Egypt	25–22	Brazil	Žatika Sport Centre, Poreč; Attendance: 2,000; Referees: Lazaar, Reveret (FRA)
22 January 2009; 18:15	Zaky 6	(13–6)	Ribeiro 5	Žatika Sport Centre, Poreč; Attendance: 2,000; Referees: Lazaar, Reveret (FRA)
22 January 2009; 18:15	3× (yellow card) 5× (suspension)	Report	3× (yellow card) 5× (suspension)	Žatika Sport Centre, Poreč; Attendance: 2,000; Referees: Lazaar, Reveret (FRA)

22 January 2009; 20:15	Denmark	32–28	Norway	Žatika Sport Centre, Poreč; Attendance: 3,200; Referees: Gousko, Repkin (BLR)
22 January 2009; 20:15	Hansen 10	(16–14)	Kjelling 9	Žatika Sport Centre, Poreč; Attendance: 3,200; Referees: Gousko, Repkin (BLR)
22 January 2009; 20:15	3× (yellow card) 2× (suspension)	Report	2× (yellow card) 4× (suspension)	Žatika Sport Centre, Poreč; Attendance: 3,200; Referees: Gousko, Repkin (BLR)

== President's Cup ==
=== Group I ===
Pos	Team	Pld	W	D	L	GF	GA	GD	Pts	Qualification
1	Spain	5	5	0	0	205	98	+107	10	13th place game
2	Romania	5	4	0	1	175	141	+34	8	15th place game
3	Argentina	5	3	0	2	137	125	+12	6	17th place game
4	Cuba	5	2	0	3	124	154	−30	4	19th place game
5	Kuwait	5	1	0	4	119	157	−38	2	21st place game
6	Australia	5	0	0	5	87	172	−85	0	23rd place game

Source: IHF
Rules for classification: 1) points; 2) head-to-head points; 3) head-to-head goal difference; 4) head-to-head number of goals scored; 5) goal difference.

24 January 2009; 15:00	Argentina	26–25	Kuwait	Mate Parlov Sport Centre, Pula; Attendance: 500; Referees: Opava, Válek (CZE)
24 January 2009; 15:00	Migueles 5	(12–12)	Abdulredha 6	Mate Parlov Sport Centre, Pula; Attendance: 500; Referees: Opava, Válek (CZE)
24 January 2009; 15:00	2× (yellow card) 4× (suspension)	Report	2× (yellow card) 4× (suspension)	Mate Parlov Sport Centre, Pula; Attendance: 500; Referees: Opava, Válek (CZE)

24 January 2009; 17:00	Australia	10–42	Spain	Mate Parlov Sport Centre, Pula; Attendance: 1,200; Referees: El-Moamli, Shaaban (EGY)
24 January 2009; 17:00	Fletcher, Subotic 3	(6–18)	Ugalde 9	Mate Parlov Sport Centre, Pula; Attendance: 1,200; Referees: El-Moamli, Shaaban (EGY)
24 January 2009; 17:00	4× (yellow card) 4× (suspension)	Report	3× (yellow card) 3× (suspension)	Mate Parlov Sport Centre, Pula; Attendance: 1,200; Referees: El-Moamli, Shaaban (EGY)

24 January 2009; 19:00	Romania	39–28	Cuba	Mate Parlov Sport Centre, Pula; Attendance: 1,000; Referees: Menezes, Pinto (BRA)
24 January 2009; 19:00	Ghionea 12	(21–15)	Carol, Turiño 6	Mate Parlov Sport Centre, Pula; Attendance: 1,000; Referees: Menezes, Pinto (BRA)
24 January 2009; 19:00	3× (yellow card) 1× (suspension)	Report	3× (yellow card) 5× (suspension)	Mate Parlov Sport Centre, Pula; Attendance: 1,000; Referees: Menezes, Pinto (BRA)

25 January 2009; 15:00	Spain	31–19	Argentina	Mate Parlov Sport Centre, Pula; Attendance: 1,600; Referees: El-Moamli, Shaaban (EGY)
25 January 2009; 15:00	García 6	(15–11)	Viscovich 5	Mate Parlov Sport Centre, Pula; Attendance: 1,600; Referees: El-Moamli, Shaaban (EGY)
25 January 2009; 15:00	3× (yellow card) 4× (suspension) 1× (red card)	Report	3× (yellow card) 3× (suspension)	Mate Parlov Sport Centre, Pula; Attendance: 1,600; Referees: El-Moamli, Shaaban (EGY)

25 January 2009; 17:00	Kuwait	27–34	Romania	Mate Parlov Sport Centre, Pula; Attendance: 1,000; Referees: Menezes, Pinto (BRA)
25 January 2009; 17:00	Al-Qallaf, Al-Gharaballi 5	(12–16)	Ghionea 8	Mate Parlov Sport Centre, Pula; Attendance: 1,000; Referees: Menezes, Pinto (BRA)
25 January 2009; 17:00	3× (yellow card) 2× (suspension)	Report	2× (yellow card) 3× (suspension)	Mate Parlov Sport Centre, Pula; Attendance: 1,000; Referees: Menezes, Pinto (BRA)

25 January 2009; 19:00	Cuba	27–17	Australia	Mate Parlov Sport Centre, Pula; Attendance: 500; Referees: Gubica, Milošević (CRO)
25 January 2009; 19:00	Díaz 5	(14–6)	Fletcher 6	Mate Parlov Sport Centre, Pula; Attendance: 500; Referees: Gubica, Milošević (CRO)
25 January 2009; 19:00	3× (yellow card) 3× (suspension)	Report	3× (yellow card) 3× (suspension)	Mate Parlov Sport Centre, Pula; Attendance: 500; Referees: Gubica, Milošević (CRO)

26 January 2009; 15:00	Australia	24–27	Kuwait	Mate Parlov Sport Centre, Pula; Attendance: 200; Referees: Menezes, Pinto (BRA)
26 January 2009; 15:00	Blondell 7	(10–14)	F. Al-Shamari 7	Mate Parlov Sport Centre, Pula; Attendance: 200; Referees: Menezes, Pinto (BRA)
26 January 2009; 15:00	4× (yellow card) 4× (suspension)	Report	3× (yellow card) 2× (suspension)	Mate Parlov Sport Centre, Pula; Attendance: 200; Referees: Menezes, Pinto (BRA)

26 January 2009; 17:00	Argentina	30–23	Cuba	Mate Parlov Sport Centre, Pula; Attendance: 500; Referees: El-Moamli, Shaaban (EGY)
26 January 2009; 17:00	Pizarro 8	(16–15)	Carol 6	Mate Parlov Sport Centre, Pula; Attendance: 500; Referees: El-Moamli, Shaaban (EGY)
26 January 2009; 17:00	3× (yellow card) 6× (suspension)	Report	3× (yellow card) 6× (suspension)	Mate Parlov Sport Centre, Pula; Attendance: 500; Referees: El-Moamli, Shaaban (EGY)

26 January 2009; 19:00	Romania	32–40	Spain	Mate Parlov Sport Centre, Pula; Attendance: 2,500; Referees: Stanojević, Višekruna (SRB)
26 January 2009; 19:00	Ghionea 7	(16–19)	Ugalde 9	Mate Parlov Sport Centre, Pula; Attendance: 2,500; Referees: Stanojević, Višekruna (SRB)
26 January 2009; 19:00	3× (yellow card) 3× (suspension)	Report	3× (yellow card) 4× (suspension)	Mate Parlov Sport Centre, Pula; Attendance: 2,500; Referees: Stanojević, Višekruna (SRB)

=== Group II ===
Pos	Team	Pld	W	D	L	GF	GA	GD	Pts	Qualification
1	Egypt	5	4	0	1	135	125	+10	8 (Note: Russia 27–31 Egypt)	13th place game
2	Russia	5	4	0	1	151	127	+24	8	15th place game
3	Tunisia	5	3	0	2	159	146	+13	6 (Note: Tunisia 36–25 Algeria)	17th place game
4	Algeria	5	3	0	2	140	142	−2	6	19th place game
5	Brazil	5	1	0	4	131	137	−6	2	21st place game
6	Saudi Arabia	5	0	0	5	105	144	−39	0	23rd place game

Source: IHF
Rules for classification: 1) points; 2) head-to-head points; 3) head-to-head goal difference; 4) head-to-head number of goals scored; 5) goal difference.
Notes:

24 January 2009; 16:00	Tunisia	28–21	Saudi Arabia	Žatika Sport Centre, Poreč; Attendance: 300; Referees: Gatelis, Mažeika (LTU)
24 January 2009; 16:00	Ayed 5	(12–8)	B. Al-Harbi 5	Žatika Sport Centre, Poreč; Attendance: 300; Referees: Gatelis, Mažeika (LTU)
24 January 2009; 16:00	3× (yellow card) 3× (suspension)	Report	3× (yellow card) 3× (suspension)	Žatika Sport Centre, Poreč; Attendance: 300; Referees: Gatelis, Mažeika (LTU)

24 January 2009; 18:00	Algeria	28–22	Egypt	Žatika Sport Centre, Poreč; Attendance: 300; Referees: Stanojević, Višekruna (SRB)
24 January 2009; 18:00	Berriah 7	(12–7)	Zaky 6	Žatika Sport Centre, Poreč; Attendance: 300; Referees: Stanojević, Višekruna (SRB)
24 January 2009; 18:00	3× (yellow card) 3× (suspension)	Report	2× (yellow card) 2× (suspension)	Žatika Sport Centre, Poreč; Attendance: 300; Referees: Stanojević, Višekruna (SRB)

24 January 2009; 20:00	Russia	25–22	Brazil	Žatika Sport Centre, Poreč; Attendance: 300; Referees: Gubica, Milošević (CRO)
24 January 2009; 20:00	Dibirov 7	(15–9)	Gaeta, Ribeiro 4	Žatika Sport Centre, Poreč; Attendance: 300; Referees: Gubica, Milošević (CRO)
24 January 2009; 20:00	3× (yellow card) 5× (suspension) 1× (red card)	Report	2× (yellow card) 4× (suspension)	Žatika Sport Centre, Poreč; Attendance: 300; Referees: Gubica, Milošević (CRO)

25 January 2009; 16:00	Egypt	31–30	Tunisia	Žatika Sport Centre, Poreč; Attendance: 1,000; Referees: Stanojević, Višekruna (SRB)
25 January 2009; 16:00	El Ahmar 11	(15–14)	Ayed 9	Žatika Sport Centre, Poreč; Attendance: 1,000; Referees: Stanojević, Višekruna (SRB)
25 January 2009; 16:00	3× (yellow card) 6× (suspension) 1× (red card)	Report	3× (yellow card) 6× (suspension)	Žatika Sport Centre, Poreč; Attendance: 1,000; Referees: Stanojević, Višekruna (SRB)

25 January 2009; 18:00	Saudi Arabia	15–34	Russia	Žatika Sport Centre, Poreč; Attendance: 1,000; Referees: Opava, Válek (CZE)
25 January 2009; 18:00	Al-Abdulali 4	(5–17)	Chernoivanov 8	Žatika Sport Centre, Poreč; Attendance: 1,000; Referees: Opava, Válek (CZE)
25 January 2009; 18:00	3× (yellow card) 2× (suspension)	Report	3× (yellow card) 2× (suspension)	Žatika Sport Centre, Poreč; Attendance: 1,000; Referees: Opava, Válek (CZE)

25 January 2009; 20:00	Brazil	28–29	Algeria	Žatika Sport Centre, Poreč; Attendance: 500; Referees: Gatelis, Mažeika (LTU)
25 January 2009; 20:00	Ribeiro, Ferreira 8	(15–10)	Boudrali 5	Žatika Sport Centre, Poreč; Attendance: 500; Referees: Gatelis, Mažeika (LTU)
25 January 2009; 20:00	3× (yellow card) 6× (suspension)	Report	3× (yellow card) 3× (suspension)	Žatika Sport Centre, Poreč; Attendance: 500; Referees: Gatelis, Mažeika (LTU)

26 January 2009; 16:00	Algeria	30–27	Saudi Arabia	Žatika Sport Centre, Poreč; Attendance: 500; Referees: Gubica, Milošević (CRO)
26 January 2009; 16:00	Soudani 8	(14–12)	B. Al-Harbi 13	Žatika Sport Centre, Poreč; Attendance: 500; Referees: Gubica, Milošević (CRO)
26 January 2009; 16:00	3× (yellow card) 2× (suspension)	Report	3× (yellow card) 4× (suspension)	Žatika Sport Centre, Poreč; Attendance: 500; Referees: Gubica, Milošević (CRO)

26 January 2009; 18:00	Tunisia	34–33	Brazil	Žatika Sport Centre, Poreč; Attendance: 500; Referees: Gatelis, Mažeika (LTU)
26 January 2009; 18:00	Touati 6	(18–16)	Ribeiro, Ferreira 9	Žatika Sport Centre, Poreč; Attendance: 500; Referees: Gatelis, Mažeika (LTU)
26 January 2009; 18:00	3× (yellow card) 3× (suspension)	Report	4× (yellow card) 6× (suspension)	Žatika Sport Centre, Poreč; Attendance: 500; Referees: Gatelis, Mažeika (LTU)

26 January 2009; 20:00	Russia	27–31	Egypt	Žatika Sport Centre, Poreč; Attendance: 1,000; Referees: Opava, Válek (CZE)
26 January 2009; 20:00	Igropulo 8	(12–16)	El Ahmar, Yousry 8	Žatika Sport Centre, Poreč; Attendance: 1,000; Referees: Opava, Válek (CZE)
26 January 2009; 20:00	3× (yellow card) 8× (suspension) 1× (red card)	Report	3× (yellow card) 5× (suspension)	Žatika Sport Centre, Poreč; Attendance: 1,000; Referees: Opava, Válek (CZE)

=== Placement games ===
==== 23rd place game ====
27 January 2009; 15:00	Australia	19–23	Saudi Arabia	Mate Parlov Sport Centre, Pula; Attendance: 300; Referees: Menezes, Pinto (BRA)
27 January 2009; 15:00	Fletcher 6	(11–15)	B. Al-Harbi 6	Mate Parlov Sport Centre, Pula; Attendance: 300; Referees: Menezes, Pinto (BRA)
27 January 2009; 15:00	3× (yellow card) 5× (suspension)	Report	3× (yellow card) 4× (suspension)	Mate Parlov Sport Centre, Pula; Attendance: 300; Referees: Menezes, Pinto (BRA)

==== 21st place game ====
27 January 2009; 16:00	Kuwait	24–27	Brazil	Žatika Sport Centre, Poreč; Attendance: 200; Referees: El-Moamli, Shaaban (EGY)
27 January 2009; 16:00	Al-Gharaballi 8	(12–13)	Ribeiro 11	Žatika Sport Centre, Poreč; Attendance: 200; Referees: El-Moamli, Shaaban (EGY)
27 January 2009; 16:00	4× (yellow card) 2× (suspension)	Report	3× (yellow card) 3× (suspension)	Žatika Sport Centre, Poreč; Attendance: 200; Referees: El-Moamli, Shaaban (EGY)

==== 19th place game ====
27 January 2009; 17:00	Cuba	27–34	Algeria	Mate Parlov Sport Centre, Pula; Attendance: 350; Referees: Gubica, Milošević (CRO)
27 January 2009; 17:00	Turiño 8	(15–18)	three players 6	Mate Parlov Sport Centre, Pula; Attendance: 350; Referees: Gubica, Milošević (CRO)
27 January 2009; 17:00	3× (yellow card) 4× (suspension)	Report	4× (yellow card) 7× (suspension)	Mate Parlov Sport Centre, Pula; Attendance: 350; Referees: Gubica, Milošević (CRO)

==== 17th place game ====
27 January 2009; 18:00	Argentina	23–29	Tunisia	Žatika Sport Centre, Poreč; Attendance: 500; Referees: Opava, Válek (CZE)
27 January 2009; 18:00	Migueles 5	(13–14)	Gharbi, Kraiem 6	Žatika Sport Centre, Poreč; Attendance: 500; Referees: Opava, Válek (CZE)
27 January 2009; 18:00	3× (yellow card) 4× (suspension)	Report	3× (yellow card) 4× (suspension)	Žatika Sport Centre, Poreč; Attendance: 500; Referees: Opava, Válek (CZE)

==== 15th place game ====
27 January 2009; 19:00	Romania	42–38	Russia	Mate Parlov Sport Centre, Pula; Attendance: 750; Referees: Gatelis, Mažeika (LTU)
27 January 2009; 19:00	Irimescu 8	(25–21)	Dibirov 12	Mate Parlov Sport Centre, Pula; Attendance: 750; Referees: Gatelis, Mažeika (LTU)
27 January 2009; 19:00	3× (yellow card) 6× (suspension)	Report	3× (yellow card) 6× (suspension)	Mate Parlov Sport Centre, Pula; Attendance: 750; Referees: Gatelis, Mažeika (LTU)

==== 13th place game ====
27 January 2009; 20:00	Spain	28–24	Egypt	Žatika Sport Centre, Poreč; Attendance: 1,000; Referees: Stanojević, Višekruna (SRB)
27 January 2009; 20:00	Cañellas 9	(15–10)	El-Salam 7	Žatika Sport Centre, Poreč; Attendance: 1,000; Referees: Stanojević, Višekruna (SRB)
27 January 2009; 20:00	3× (yellow card) 2× (suspension)	Report	3× (yellow card) 4× (suspension)	Žatika Sport Centre, Poreč; Attendance: 1,000; Referees: Stanojević, Višekruna (SRB)

== Main round ==
=== Group I ===
Pos	Team	Pld	W	D	L	GF	GA	GD	Pts	Qualification
1	Croatia (H)	5	5	0	0	137	118	+19	10	Semifinals
2	France	5	4	0	1	139	112	+27	8	Semifinals
3	Hungary	5	2	1	2	127	135	−8	5	Fifth place game
4	Sweden	5	2	0	3	135	140	−5	4	Seventh place game
5	Slovakia	5	1	1	3	124	137	−13	3	Ninth place game
6	South Korea	5	0	0	5	119	139	−20	0	Eleventh place game

Source: IHF
Rules for classification: 1) points; 2) head-to-head points; 3) head-to-head goal difference; 4) head-to-head number of goals scored; 5) goal difference.
(H) Hosts

24 January 2009; 16:30	Slovakia	23–20	South Korea	Arena Zagreb, Zagreb; Attendance: 3,000; Referees: Gjeding, Hansen (DEN)
24 January 2009; 16:30	Šulc 6	(15–12)	Lee J. 8	Arena Zagreb, Zagreb; Attendance: 3,000; Referees: Gjeding, Hansen (DEN)
24 January 2009; 16:30	3× (yellow card) 5× (suspension)	Report	2× (yellow card) 2× (suspension)	Arena Zagreb, Zagreb; Attendance: 3,000; Referees: Gjeding, Hansen (DEN)

24 January 2009; 18:30	France	28–21	Sweden	Arena Zagreb, Zagreb; Attendance: 13,000; Referees: Baum, Góralczyk (POL)
24 January 2009; 18:30	Guigou, Karabatić 7	(16–10)	Andersson 5	Arena Zagreb, Zagreb; Attendance: 13,000; Referees: Baum, Góralczyk (POL)
24 January 2009; 18:30	2× (yellow card) 3× (suspension)	Report	3× (yellow card) 1× (suspension) 1× (red card)	Arena Zagreb, Zagreb; Attendance: 13,000; Referees: Baum, Góralczyk (POL)

24 January 2009; 20:30	Hungary	22–27	Croatia	Arena Zagreb, Zagreb; Attendance: 15,000; Referees: Olesen, Pedersen (DEN)
24 January 2009; 20:30	Nagy 6	(12–14)	Čupić 6	Arena Zagreb, Zagreb; Attendance: 15,000; Referees: Olesen, Pedersen (DEN)
24 January 2009; 20:30	3× (yellow card) 3× (suspension)	Report	4× (yellow card) 3× (suspension)	Arena Zagreb, Zagreb; Attendance: 15,000; Referees: Olesen, Pedersen (DEN)

25 January 2009; 16:30	Sweden	30–31	Hungary	Arena Zagreb, Zagreb; Attendance: 4,000; Referees: Lemme, Ullrich (GER)
25 January 2009; 16:30	Källman 8	(18–16)	Ilyés 8	Arena Zagreb, Zagreb; Attendance: 4,000; Referees: Lemme, Ullrich (GER)
25 January 2009; 16:30	2× (yellow card) 4× (suspension) 1× (red card)	Report	3× (yellow card) 6× (suspension)	Arena Zagreb, Zagreb; Attendance: 4,000; Referees: Lemme, Ullrich (GER)

25 January 2009; 18:30	South Korea	21–30	France	Arena Zagreb, Zagreb; Attendance: 10,000; Referees: Olesen, Pedersen (DEN)
25 January 2009; 18:30	Kim T., Oh Y. 5	(15–15)	Abalo, Guigou 5	Arena Zagreb, Zagreb; Attendance: 10,000; Referees: Olesen, Pedersen (DEN)
25 January 2009; 18:30	3× (yellow card) 3× (suspension)	Report	3× (yellow card) 4× (suspension)	Arena Zagreb, Zagreb; Attendance: 10,000; Referees: Olesen, Pedersen (DEN)

25 January 2009; 20:30	Croatia	31–25	Slovakia	Arena Zagreb, Zagreb; Attendance: 15,000; Referees: Gousko, Repkin (BLR)
25 January 2009; 20:30	Hrvatin 6	(18–13)	Šulc 7	Arena Zagreb, Zagreb; Attendance: 15,000; Referees: Gousko, Repkin (BLR)
25 January 2009; 20:30	3× (yellow card) 2× (suspension)	Report	3× (yellow card) 4× (suspension)	Arena Zagreb, Zagreb; Attendance: 15,000; Referees: Gousko, Repkin (BLR)

27 January 2009; 16:30	Hungary	28–27	South Korea	Arena Zagreb, Zagreb; Attendance: 800; Referees: Gousko, Repkin (BLR)
27 January 2009; 16:30	Császár 8	(11–14)	Lee J. 7	Arena Zagreb, Zagreb; Attendance: 800; Referees: Gousko, Repkin (BLR)
27 January 2009; 16:30	1× (yellow card) 4× (suspension)	Report	1× (yellow card) 2× (suspension)	Arena Zagreb, Zagreb; Attendance: 800; Referees: Gousko, Repkin (BLR)

27 January 2009; 18:30	Slovakia	26–27	Sweden	Arena Zagreb, Zagreb; Attendance: 10,000; Referees: Gjeding, Hansen (DEN)
27 January 2009; 18:30	Kukučka 9	(11–16)	Doder 11	Arena Zagreb, Zagreb; Attendance: 10,000; Referees: Gjeding, Hansen (DEN)
27 January 2009; 18:30	3× (yellow card) 5× (suspension)	Report	3× (yellow card) 4× (suspension) 1× (red card)	Arena Zagreb, Zagreb; Attendance: 10,000; Referees: Gjeding, Hansen (DEN)

27 January 2009; 20:30	France	19–22	Croatia	Arena Zagreb, Zagreb; Attendance: 15,000; Referees: Baum, Góralczyk (POL)
27 January 2009; 20:30	Junillon 5	(7–11)	Vori 8	Arena Zagreb, Zagreb; Attendance: 15,000; Referees: Baum, Góralczyk (POL)
27 January 2009; 20:30	3× (yellow card) 2× (suspension)	Report	3× (yellow card) 3× (suspension)	Arena Zagreb, Zagreb; Attendance: 15,000; Referees: Baum, Góralczyk (POL)

=== Group II ===
Pos	Team	Pld	W	D	L	GF	GA	GD	Pts	Qualification
1	Denmark	5	4	0	1	156	145	+11	8	Semifinals
2	Poland	5	3	0	2	150	141	+9	6	Semifinals
3	Germany	5	2	1	2	147	133	+14	5 (Note: Germany 35–35 Serbia)	Fifth place game
4	Serbia	5	2	1	2	153	161	−8	5	Seventh place game
5	Norway	5	2	0	3	138	141	−3	4	Ninth place game
6	North Macedonia	5	1	0	4	132	155	−23	2	Eleventh place game

Source: IHF
Rules for classification: 1) points; 2) head-to-head points; 3) head-to-head goal difference; 4) head-to-head number of goals scored; 5) goal difference.
Notes:

24 January 2009; 15:30	North Macedonia	27–29	Norway	Krešimir Ćosić Hall, Zadar; Attendance: 4,500; Referees: Caçador, Nicolau (POR)
24 January 2009; 15:30	K. Lazarov 9	(13–16)	Tvedten 10	Krešimir Ćosić Hall, Zadar; Attendance: 4,500; Referees: Caçador, Nicolau (POR)
24 January 2009; 15:30	4× (yellow card) 2× (suspension)	Report	4× (yellow card) 5× (suspension) 1× (red card)	Krešimir Ćosić Hall, Zadar; Attendance: 4,500; Referees: Caçador, Nicolau (POR)

24 January 2009; 17:30	Germany	35–35	Serbia	Krešimir Ćosić Hall, Zadar; Attendance: 4,500; Referees: Lazaar, Reveret (FRA)
24 January 2009; 17:30	Jansen 10	(16–19)	Bojinović 8	Krešimir Ćosić Hall, Zadar; Attendance: 4,500; Referees: Lazaar, Reveret (FRA)
24 January 2009; 17:30	3× (yellow card) 4× (suspension)	Report	3× (yellow card) 4× (suspension) 1× (red card)	Krešimir Ćosić Hall, Zadar; Attendance: 4,500; Referees: Lazaar, Reveret (FRA)

24 January 2009; 20:15	Poland	32–28	Denmark	Krešimir Ćosić Hall, Zadar; Attendance: 1,500; Referees: Din, Dinu (ROU)
24 January 2009; 20:15	Kuchczyński 9	(20–12)	Boesen 6	Krešimir Ćosić Hall, Zadar; Attendance: 1,500; Referees: Din, Dinu (ROU)
24 January 2009; 20:15	3× (yellow card) 5× (suspension)	Report	4× (yellow card) 4× (suspension)	Krešimir Ćosić Hall, Zadar; Attendance: 1,500; Referees: Din, Dinu (ROU)

25 January 2009; 15:30	Serbia	23–35	Poland	Krešimir Ćosić Hall, Zadar; Attendance: 2,000; Referees: Caçador, Nicolau (POR)
25 January 2009; 15:30	Ilić 6	(7–21)	Tłuczyński 11	Krešimir Ćosić Hall, Zadar; Attendance: 2,000; Referees: Caçador, Nicolau (POR)
25 January 2009; 15:30	3× (yellow card) 2× (suspension)	Report	3× (yellow card) 2× (suspension)	Krešimir Ćosić Hall, Zadar; Attendance: 2,000; Referees: Caçador, Nicolau (POR)

25 January 2009; 17:30	Norway	25–24	Germany	Krešimir Ćosić Hall, Zadar; Attendance: 2,500; Referees: Krstič, Ljubič (SLO)
25 January 2009; 17:30	Kjelling, Tvedten 7	(12–12)	Glandorf 6	Krešimir Ćosić Hall, Zadar; Attendance: 2,500; Referees: Krstič, Ljubič (SLO)
25 January 2009; 17:30	4× (yellow card) 5× (suspension)	Report	4× (yellow card) 5× (suspension) 1× (red card)	Krešimir Ćosić Hall, Zadar; Attendance: 2,500; Referees: Krstič, Ljubič (SLO)

25 January 2009; 20:15	Denmark	32–24	North Macedonia	Krešimir Ćosić Hall, Zadar; Attendance: 5,500; Referees: Lazaar, Navaret (FRA)
25 January 2009; 20:15	Christiansen 8	(13–12)	K. Lazarov 8	Krešimir Ćosić Hall, Zadar; Attendance: 5,500; Referees: Lazaar, Navaret (FRA)
25 January 2009; 20:15	3× (yellow card) 4× (suspension)	Report	3× (yellow card) 6× (suspension)	Krešimir Ćosić Hall, Zadar; Attendance: 5,500; Referees: Lazaar, Navaret (FRA)

27 January 2009; 15:30	North Macedonia	28–32	Serbia	Krešimir Ćosić Hall, Zadar; Attendance: 3,500; Referees: Krstič, Ljubič (SLO)
27 January 2009; 15:30	K. Lazarov 7	(16–15)	Ilić 8	Krešimir Ćosić Hall, Zadar; Attendance: 3,500; Referees: Krstič, Ljubič (SLO)
27 January 2009; 15:30	3× (yellow card) 3× (suspension)	Report	3× (yellow card) 5× (suspension) 1× (red card)	Krešimir Ćosić Hall, Zadar; Attendance: 3,500; Referees: Krstič, Ljubič (SLO)

27 January 2009; 17:30	Germany	25–27	Denmark	Krešimir Ćosić Hall, Zadar; Attendance: 3,000; Referees: Din, Dinu (ROU)
27 January 2009; 17:30	Preiß 7	(14–14)	Lindberg 6	Krešimir Ćosić Hall, Zadar; Attendance: 3,000; Referees: Din, Dinu (ROU)
27 January 2009; 17:30	4× (yellow card) 6× (suspension)	Report	3× (yellow card) 4× (suspension)	Krešimir Ćosić Hall, Zadar; Attendance: 3,000; Referees: Din, Dinu (ROU)

27 January 2009; 20:15	Poland	31–30	Norway	Krešimir Ćosić Hall, Zadar; Attendance: 4,200; Referees: Lazaar, Reveret (FRA)
27 January 2009; 20:15	Bielecki 5	(14–14)	Kjelling 8	Krešimir Ćosić Hall, Zadar; Attendance: 4,200; Referees: Lazaar, Reveret (FRA)
27 January 2009; 20:15	3× (yellow card) 3× (suspension)	Report	3× (yellow card) 4× (suspension)	Krešimir Ćosić Hall, Zadar; Attendance: 4,200; Referees: Lazaar, Reveret (FRA)

== Final round ==
=== Bracket ===
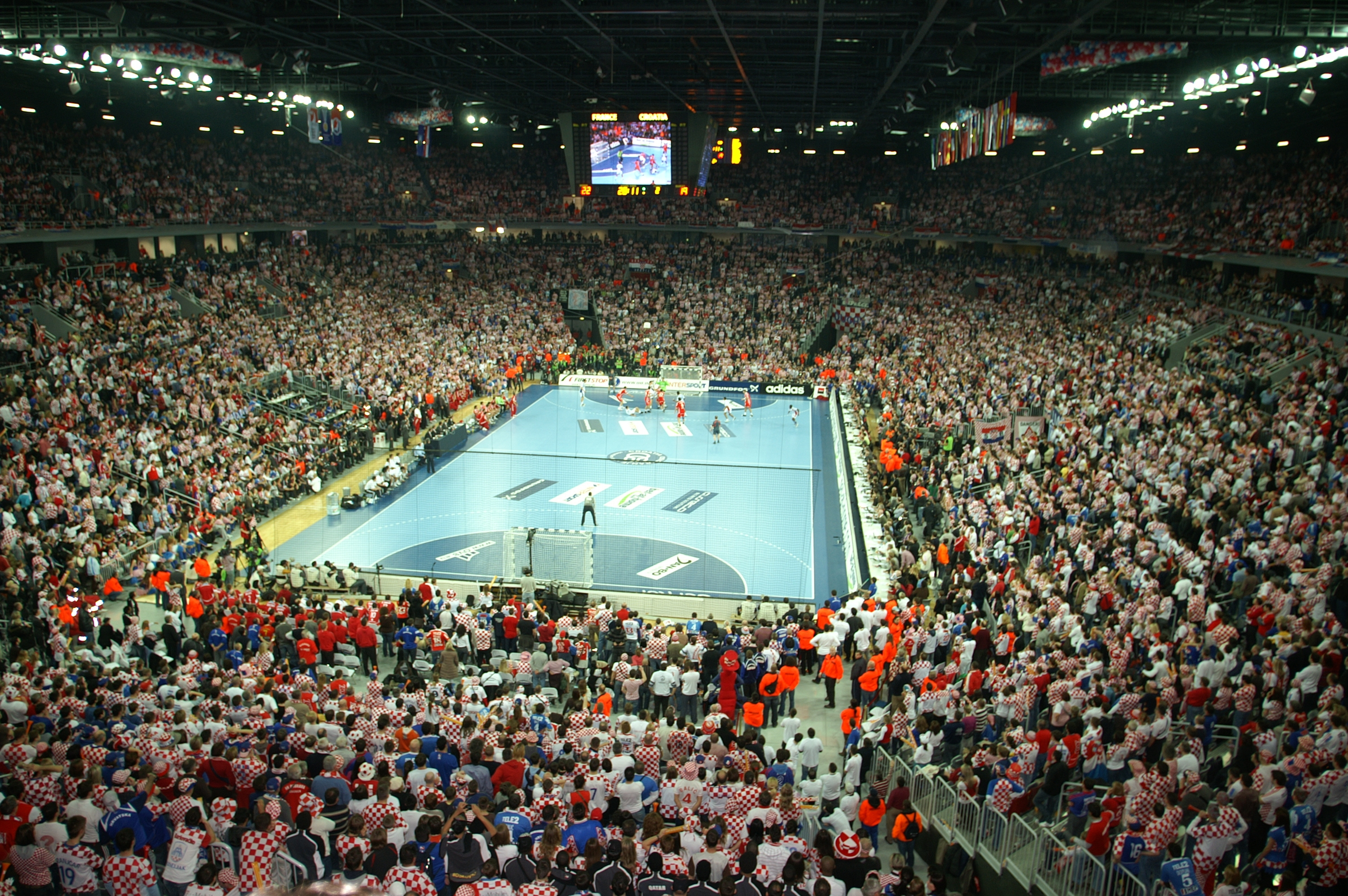
Final, France vs. Croatia, 22:19, 28:11 min, Arena Zagreb

Semifinals
30 January
Denmark	22
France	27
30 January
Croatia	29
Poland	23

Final
1 February
France	24
Croatia	19
Third place
1 February
Denmark	23
Poland	31

=== Semifinals ===
30 January 2009; 17:30	Denmark	22–27	France	Spaladium Arena, Split; Attendance: 11,000; Referees: Gousko, Repkin (BLR)
30 January 2009; 17:30	Jørgensen 5	(11–16)	Abalo 7	Spaladium Arena, Split; Attendance: 11,000; Referees: Gousko, Repkin (BLR)
30 January 2009; 17:30	3× (yellow card)	Report	2× (yellow card) 2× (suspension) 1× (red card)	Spaladium Arena, Split; Attendance: 11,000; Referees: Gousko, Repkin (BLR)

30 January 2009; 20:30	Croatia	29–23	Poland	Arena Zagreb, Zagreb; Attendance: 15,000; Referees: Lemme, Ullrich (GER)
30 January 2009; 20:30	Čupić 12	(14–13)	Jurasik 6	Arena Zagreb, Zagreb; Attendance: 15,000; Referees: Lemme, Ullrich (GER)
30 January 2009; 20:30	3× (yellow card) 3× (suspension)	Report	3× (yellow card) 4× (suspension)	Arena Zagreb, Zagreb; Attendance: 15,000; Referees: Lemme, Ullrich (GER)

=== Eleventh place game ===
29 January 2009; 12:30	South Korea	31–32	North Macedonia	Arena Zagreb, Zagreb; Attendance: 1,000; Referees: Menezes, Pinto (BRA)
29 January 2009; 12:30	Jeong 7	(14–14)	K. Lazarov 15	Arena Zagreb, Zagreb; Attendance: 1,000; Referees: Menezes, Pinto (BRA)
29 January 2009; 12:30	2× (yellow card) 3× (suspension)	Report	4× (yellow card) 4× (suspension)	Arena Zagreb, Zagreb; Attendance: 1,000; Referees: Menezes, Pinto (BRA)

=== Ninth place game ===
29 January 2009; 20:15	Slovakia	27–34	Norway	Arena Zagreb, Zagreb; Attendance: 3,000; Referees: Gubica, Milošević (CRO)
29 January 2009; 20:15	Kukučka 6	(14–18)	Kjelling 9	Arena Zagreb, Zagreb; Attendance: 3,000; Referees: Gubica, Milošević (CRO)
29 January 2009; 20:15	2× (yellow card) 6× (suspension)	Report	3× (yellow card) 5× (suspension)	Arena Zagreb, Zagreb; Attendance: 3,000; Referees: Gubica, Milošević (CRO)

=== Seventh place game ===
29 January 2009; 17:30	Sweden	37–29	Serbia	Arena Zagreb, Zagreb; Attendance: 5,300; Referees: Karbaschi, Kolahdouzan (IRI)
29 January 2009; 17:30	Gustafsson 7	(20–16)	Vujin, Vučković 5	Arena Zagreb, Zagreb; Attendance: 5,300; Referees: Karbaschi, Kolahdouzan (IRI)
29 January 2009; 17:30	4× (yellow card) 3× (suspension)	Report	1× (yellow card) 3× (suspension)	Arena Zagreb, Zagreb; Attendance: 5,300; Referees: Karbaschi, Kolahdouzan (IRI)

=== Fifth place game ===
29 January 2009; 15:00	Hungary	25–28	Germany	Arena Zagreb, Zagreb; Attendance: 3,000; Referees: Baum, Góralczyk (POL)
29 January 2009; 15:00	Nagy 5	(13–16)	Kaufmann 8	Arena Zagreb, Zagreb; Attendance: 3,000; Referees: Baum, Góralczyk (POL)
29 January 2009; 15:00	3× (yellow card)	Report	3× (yellow card) 2× (suspension)	Arena Zagreb, Zagreb; Attendance: 3,000; Referees: Baum, Góralczyk (POL)

=== Third place game ===
1 February 2009; 15:00	Denmark	23–31	Poland	Arena Zagreb, Zagreb; Attendance: 8,000; Referees: Lazaar, Reveret (FRA)
1 February 2009; 15:00	Hansen 10	(11–14)	Bielecki 10	Arena Zagreb, Zagreb; Attendance: 8,000; Referees: Lazaar, Reveret (FRA)
1 February 2009; 15:00	3× (yellow card) 5× (suspension)	Report	3× (yellow card) 3× (suspension)	Arena Zagreb, Zagreb; Attendance: 8,000; Referees: Lazaar, Reveret (FRA)

=== Final ===
1 February 2009; 17:30	France	24–19	Croatia	Arena Zagreb, Zagreb; Attendance: 15,000; Referees: Olsen, Pedersen (DEN)
1 February 2009; 17:30	Guigou 10	(11–12)	Čupić 6	Arena Zagreb, Zagreb; Attendance: 15,000; Referees: Olsen, Pedersen (DEN)
1 February 2009; 17:30	4× (yellow card) 2× (suspension)	Report	4× (yellow card) 3× (suspension) 1× (red card)	Arena Zagreb, Zagreb; Attendance: 15,000; Referees: Olsen, Pedersen (DEN)

France
GK	12	Daouda Karaboué	0/1		00:14
GK	16	Thierry Omeyer	10/28		59:46
LB	2	Jérôme Fernandez	2/3		42:09
P	3	Didier Dinart	0/0	Suspension	33:19
CB	5	Guillaume Gille	0/1		45:00
CB	8	Daniel Narcisse	6/6		21:48
LB	13	Nikola Karabatic	2/5	Suspension	54:25
P	14	Christophe Kempé	0/0		00:00
LB	15	Franck Junillon	0/0		00:00
RW	18	Joël Abati	0/0		00:00
RW	19	Luc Abalo	2/4		60:00
P	20	Cédric Sorhaindo	2/4		43:19
LW	21	Michaël Guigou	10/12		56:25
LW	24	Sébastien Ostertag	0/1		3:35
Coach : Claude Onesta

France	Statistics	Croatia
24/36	Goals scored	19/36
67%	% success	53%
7/7	Jets of 7m	4/4
4 min	Suspensions	6 min
4	Yellow cards	4
0	Red cards	1
10/29	Total shots	7/31
34%	% total shots	22%

Croatia
GK	1	Venio Losert	1/7		9:07
GK	25	Mirko Alilović	6/24		50:53
CB	4	Ivano Balić	1/2		18:34
CB	5	Domagoj Duvnjak	2/6		41:10
LB	6	Blaženko Lacković	4/7		29:43
RB	8	Marko Kopljar	0/0		7:29
P	9	Igor Vori	2/2		58:28
LB	10	Jakov Gojun	0/0		13:45
RW	13	Zlatko Horvat	0/0		4:17
LW	17	Goran Šprem	3/8		48:00
CB	18	Denis Špoljarić	0/0		5:23
RB	19	Petar Metličić	1/5	Suspension	40:10
LB	24	Tonči Valčić	0/0	Suspension	35:21
RW	27	Ivan Čupić	6/6		57:40
Coach : Lino Červar

== Ranking and statistics ==
=== Final ranking ===
Rank	Team
Gold medal	France
Silver medal	Croatia
Bronze medal	Poland
4	Denmark
5	Germany
6	Hungary
7	Sweden
8	Serbia
9	Norway
10	Slovakia
11	North Macedonia
12	South Korea
13	Spain
14	Egypt
15	Romania
16	Russia
17	Tunisia
18	Argentina
19	Algeria
20	Cuba
21	Brazil
22	Kuwait
23	Saudi Arabia
24	Australia

2009 Men's World Champions

France
Third title

Team roster: Jérôme Fernandez, Didier Dinart, Guillaume Gille, Daniel Narcisse, Guillaume Joli, Daouda Karaboué, Nikola Karabatić, Christophe Kempe, Franck Junillon, Thierry Omeyer, Joël Abati, Luc Abalo, Cedric Sorhaindo, Michaël Guigou, Sebastien Bosquet and Sebastien Ostertag.
Head coach: Claude Onesta.

=== All Star Team ===
The All Star Team and MVP was announced on 1 February 2009.

Position	Player
Most valuable player	Igor Vori (CRO)
Goalkeeper	Thierry Omeyer (FRA)
Right wing	Ivan Čupić (CRO)
Right back	Marcin Lijewski (POL)
Centre back	Nikola Karabatić (FRA)
Left back	Blaženko Lacković (CRO)
Left wing	Michaël Guigou (FRA)
Pivot	Igor Vori (CRO)

=== Top goalscorers ===
Rank	Name	Team	Goals	Shots	%
1	Kiril Lazarov	North Macedonia	92	167	55
2	Ivan Čupić	Croatia	66	81	81
3	Felipe Borges Ribeiro	Brazil	61	87	70
4	Valentin Ghionea	Romania	58	87	67
4	Tomasz Tłuczyński	Poland	58	73	79
6	Bandar Al-Harbi	Saudi Arabia	55	100	55
7	Kristian Kjelling	Norway	54	102	53
8	Michaël Guigou	France	52	66	79
8	Momir Ilić	Serbia	52	100	52
10	Hussein Zaky	Egypt	50	98	51

Source: IHF

=== Top goalkeepers ===
Rank	Name	Team	%	Saves	Shots
1	Per Sandström	Sweden	44	52	118
2	Nándor Fazekas	Hungary	41	79	195
2	Daouda Karaboué	France	41	41	99
2	Richard Štochl	Slovakia	41	110	266
5	Mohamed Bakir El-Nakib	Egypt	39	62	157
5	José Manuel Sierra	Spain	39	54	139
7	Steinar Ege	Norway	38	95	249
7	Andreas Palicka	Sweden	38	44	116
9	Thierry Omeyer	France	37	91	244
9	Johan Sjöstrand	Sweden	37	56	150

Source: IHF

== Medalists ==
Gold	Silver	Bronze
France	Croatia	Poland

== IHF broadcasting rights ==
- Croatia: RTL
- Bosnia and Herzegovina: BHRT (BHT 1)
- Brazil: ESPN Brasil
- Denmark: TV 2, TV 2 Sport
- Egypt: Nile Sport
- France: Sport+
- Germany: RTL, DSF
- Hungary: Sport TV
- Kuwait: Kuwait Sport Channel 3 and Kuwait Sport +
- North Macedonia: Sitel
- Norway: TV 2, TV 2 Zebra and TV 2 Sport
- Poland: TVP (TVP2 and TVP Sport)
- Romania: TVR, Sport 1
- Russia: NTV Plus
- Qatar (Middle East): Al Jazeera Sports
- Serbia: RTS (RTS 1)
- Slovenia: RTV Slovenija
- Spain: TVE (TVE2, Teledeporte)
- Sweden: TV 4
- Tunisia: Tunis 7

High Definition

- Denmark: TV2 Sport HD
- Poland: TVP (TVP HD)
- Russia: NTV Plus HD
- Qatar (Middle East): Al Jazeera Sports HD
- Sweden: TV4 HD
