= Žatika Sport Centre =

Multi-purpose indoor arena in Poreč, Croatia

- Interactive map of Žatika Sport Centre
- Location: Poreč, Croatia
- Coordinates: 45.224436°N 13.606844°E
- Capacity: 3,700

Construction
- Opened: 21 November 2008; 17 years ago
- Cost: EUR € 16,5 million HRK 117 million

Žatika Sport Centre is a multi-purpose indoor arena in Poreč, Croatia. It was built for hosting the 2009 World Men's Handball Championship, and formally opened on 21 November 2008. The total area of the hall is about 14,000 square metres, and it has a total seating capacity of around 3,700. The hall will host again in 2025 with the country, Denmark and Norway. The arena will also host the 2025 men's and women's Indoor Hockey World Cup.

Apart from the big hall, a small hall is being planned too. It will have 213.40 square metres. There will be a fitness hall of 86.26 square metres as well, on the same level with the main courts. Along with all following contents, there will be additional room for restaurants and sport clubs' needs, as well as for a number of temporary objects for events and fairs.

The authors of the project are Sonja Jurković, Sanja Gašparović, Nataša Martinčić and Tatjana Peraković.

== See also ==
- List of indoor arenas in Croatia
- List of indoor arenas in Europe
