= Franck Junillon =

French handball player (born 1978)

Sébastien Bosquet
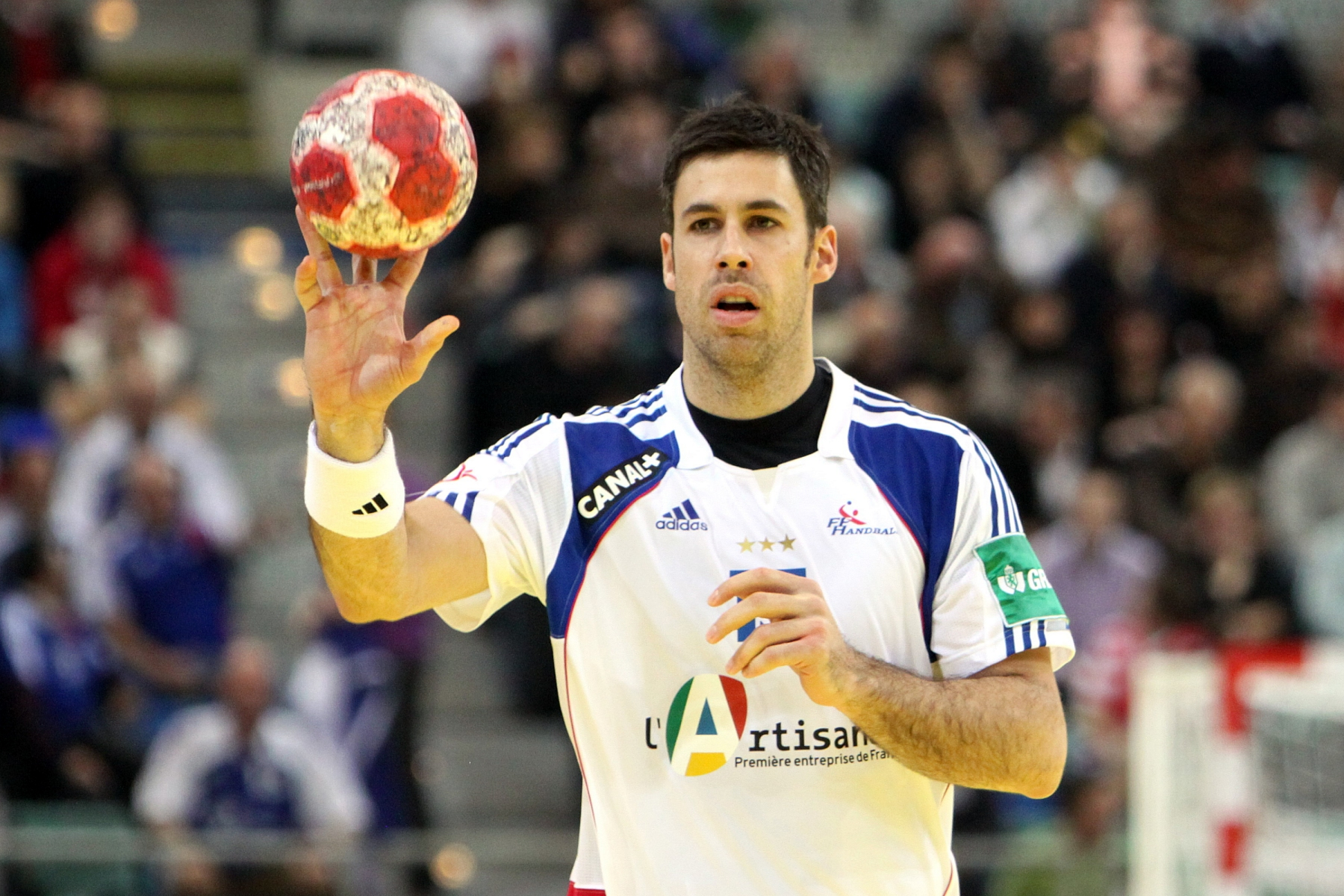

Personal information
- Nationality: French
- Born: 28 November 1978 (age 47) Montpellier, France
- Height: 196 cm (77 in)

Sport
- Sport: Handball
- Position: Centre back / Left back
- Current club: Retired

Youth career
- Years: Team
- -1987: Istres Ouest Provence Handball
- 1987-1997: Montpellier Handball

Senior clubs
- Years: Team
- 1997-2008: Montpellier Handball
- 2008-2010: MT Melsungen
- 2010-2012: USAM Nîmes
National team
Years	Team	Apps	(Gls)
2001-2011	France	101	(127)
Medal record
Representing France
World Championships
Bronze medal – third place	2005 Tunisia	Team
Gold medal – first place	2009 Croatia	Team competition
European Championships
Gold medal – first place	2010 Austria	Team

Franck Junillon (born 28 November 1978 in Montpellier) is a French team handball player. He played on the France men's national handball team which won gold medals at the 2009 World Men's Handball Championship in Croatia.

== Career ==
As a youth player Junillon played for Istres Ouest Provence Handball. In 1987 he joined Montpellier Handball, where he made his senior debut 10 years later. With the club he won the both French Championship and French cup 7 times and the French League Cup 5 teams. In 2003 he the EHF Champions League, when they beat Spanish Portland San Antonio in the final 19-27 away and 31-19 at home. This was the first time a French club won the tournament.

From 2008 to 2010 he played for German team MT Melsungen. Afterwards he joined USAM Nîmes. He retired in 2012.

=== National team ===
Junillon played 101 matches for the French national team. His first major international tournament was the 2004 European Men's Handball Championship, where France finished 6th.

At the 2005 World Championship he won bronze medals.

At the 2006 and 2008 European Championship and the 2007 World Championship he was only a part of the extended French squad.

At the 2009 World Championship he became a world Champion, and at the 2010 European Championship he became a European Champion.
