= Rabah Soudani =

Algerian handball player (born 1985)

Personal information
- Nationality: Algerian
- Born: 8 April 1985 (age 41) Roubaix, France
- Height: 1.92 m (6 ft 4 in)

Sport
- Sport: Handball
- Position: Right wing
- Current club: Cherbourg
National team
Years	Team	Apps	(Gls)
2008-2016	Algeria	31	(36)

Rabah Soudani (born 8 April 1985) is an Algerian handball player currently playing for Cherbourg and the Algerian National Team.

Soudani was chosen in the Algerian team for the 2009 World Men's Handball Championship in Croatia.
