= Joël Abati =

French handball player (born 1970)

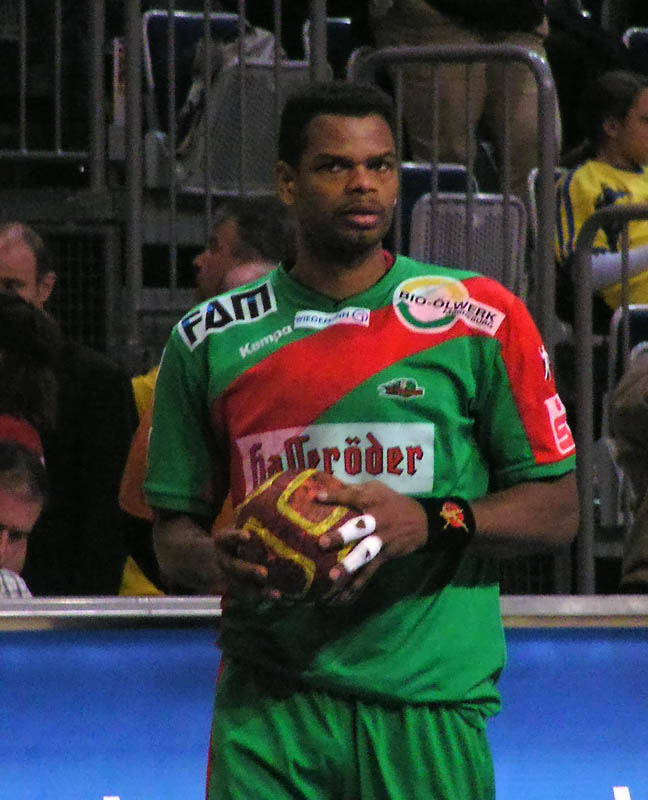
- Joël Abati on 21 February 2007

Personal information
- Nationality: French
- Born: 25 April 1970 (age 56) Fort-de-France, Martinique
- Height: 180 cm (71 in)

Sport
- Sport: Handball
- Position: Centre back
- Current club: Retired

Youth career
- Years: Team
- 1985-1990: Espoir de Floreal

Senior clubs
- Years: Team
- 1990-1991: Saint-Michel Sports
- 1991-1992: Levallois Sporting Club
- 1992-1995: USM Gagny
- 1995-1997: US Créteil
- 1997-2007: SC Magdeburg
- 2007-2009: Montpellier Handball
- 2011: SC DHfK Leipzig
National team
Years	Team	Apps	(Gls)
1995-2009	France	204	(585)
Medal record
Summer Olympics
Gold medal – first place	2008 Beijing	Team competition
World Championship
Gold medal – first place	2001 France
Gold medal – first place	2009 Croatia
Bronze medal – third place	2003 Portugal
Bronze medal – third place	2005 Tunisia
European Championship
Gold medal – first place	2006 Switzerland
Bronze medal – third place	2008 Norway

Joël Marc Abati (born 25 April 1970) is a French handball player who has played ten years for SC Magdeburg in Germany until 2007. After returning to France and playing two years for Montpellier HB he ended his professional career in 2009, having won numerous prizes for his clubs and his country. In November 2019 he signed as trainer for the Belgian club Sporting Pelt. He shortly returned to handball in May 2011 to join SC DHfK Leipzig in Germany.

With France national team he is Olympic champion in 2008, World champion in 2001 and 2009 and European champion in 2006.

== Club history ==
- Espoir de Floreal (France)
- 1990-91 : Saint Michel sur Orges (France)
- 1991-92 : Levallois SC (France)
- 1992-95 : USM Gagny (France)
- 1995-97 : US Créteil (France)
- 1997-2007 : SC Magdeburg (Germany)
- 2007-2009 : Montpellier HB (France)

== Honors ==
with France national team

- Olympic games
  - Gold in 2008
  - 5th in 2004
- World Men's Handball Championship
  - Gold in 2001, 2009
  - Bronze in 2003, 2005
- European Men's Handball Championship
  - Gold in 2006
  - Bronze in 2008

with clubs

- EHF Champions League: 2002
- EHF Cup: 1999, 2001, 2007
- German Championship: 2001
- French Championship: 2008, 2009
- French Cup: 1997, 2008, 2009
- French League Cup: 2008
