= Daouda Karaboué =

French handball player (born 1975)

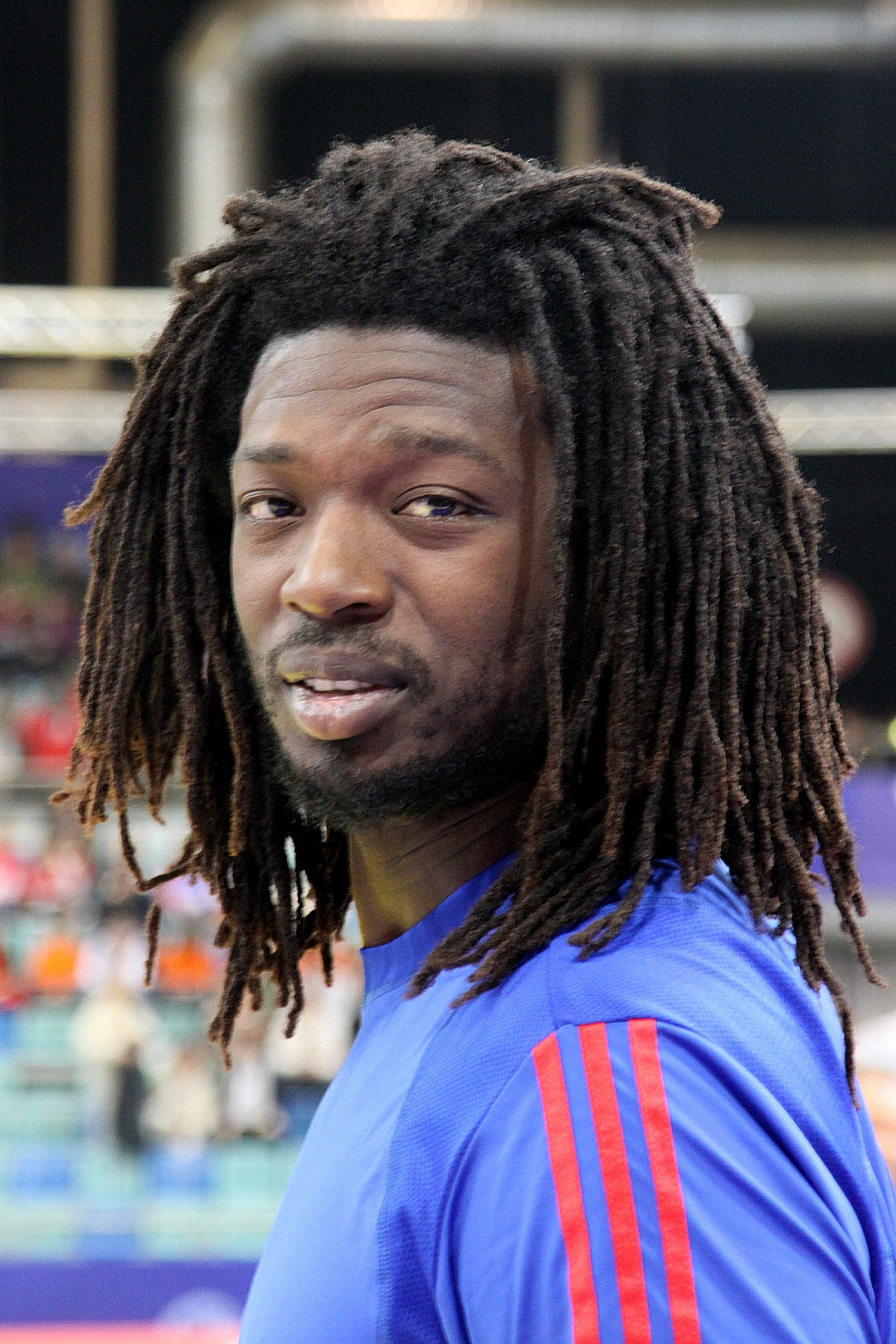

Personal information
- Born: 11 December 1975 (age 50) Abidjan, Côte d'Ivoire
- Height: 198 cm (78 in)

Sport
- Sport: Handball
- Position: Goalkeeper

Youth career
- Years: Team
- 1984-1993: Mandelieu

Senior clubs
- Years: Team
- 1993-2000: Montpellier HB
- 2000-2002: SG Hameln
- 2002-2004: Grasshoppers Zürich
- 2004-2010: Montpellier HB
- 2010-2013: Fenix Toulouse Handball
National team
Years	Team	Apps	(Gls)
2004-2013	France	151	(0)

Teams managed
- 2015-: Pays d'Aix UC (GK Coach)
Medal record
Olympic Games
Gold medal – first place	2008 Beijing	Team competition
Gold medal – first place	2012 London	Team competition
World Championships
Gold medal – first place	2011 Sweden	Team competition
Gold medal – first place	2009 Croatia	Team competition
Bronze medal – third place	2005 Tunisia	Team competition
European Championships
Gold medal – first place	2006 Switzerland	Team competition
Gold medal – first place	2010 Austria	Team competition
Bronze medal – third place	2008 Norway	Team competition

Daouda Karaboué (born 11 December 1975 in Abidjan, Côte d'Ivoire) is a French handball player, he won the gold medal at the 2008 Summer Olympics, the 2009 World Championships and the 2012 Summer Olympics.

He was awarded Chevalier de la Légion d'honneur in 2008 for playing handball at the Beijing Olympics and for having 14 years of sporting activity.

He retired in May 2013. In 2015 he became the goalkeeping coach at French club Pays d'Aix UC.
