= Christophe Kempé =

French handball player (born 1975)

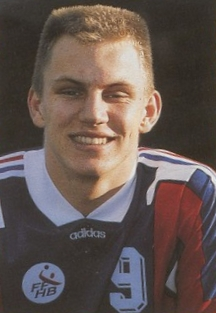
- Kempé in 1994

Personal information
- Full name: Christophe Maurice Jean Kempé
- Born: 2 May 1975 (age 51) Aubervilliers, France
- Height: 193 cm (76 in)

Sport
- Sport: Handball
- Position: Pivot

Senior clubs
- Years: Team
- 1995-1996: USAM Nîmes
- 1996-1999: Sporting Toulouse 31
- 1999-2011: Bidasoa Irún
- 2001-2010: Toulouse Handball
National team
Years	Team	Apps	(Gls)
1996-2010	France	117	(267)
Medal record
Men's handball
Representing France
Olympic Games
Gold medal – first place	2008 Beijing	Team competition
Mediterranean Games
Bronze medal – third place	2001 Tunis	Team competition
World Championships
Gold medal – first place	2009 Croatia
Bronze medal – third place	2003 Portugal
Bronze medal – third place	2005 Tunisia
European Championships
Gold medal – first place	2006 Switzerland
Bronze medal – third place	2008 Norway

Christophe Maurice Jean Kempé, nicknamed 'Tito' (born 2 May 1975) is a French for handball player. He won a gold medal as a member of France's national team at the 2008 Summer Olympics. He also won gold medals at the 2009 World Men's Handball Championship.

== Career ==
Kempés senior debut came at USAM Nîmes in the highest French league. A year later he joined Sporting Toulouse 31, where he won the French Cup in 1998. In 1999 he joined Bidasoa Irún in Spain. Two years later he returned to Toulouse, where he played until 2010.

== Post playing career ==
After retiring from playing, he became part of the commercial department of his former club Fenix Toulouse Handball.

In May 2024 in the leadup to the 2024 Olympics he was one of the people carrying the Olympic torch.
