= Sparbanken Arena =

Sparbanken Arena may refer to one of the following places:

- Sparbanken Lidköping Arena, a sports arena in Lidköping, Sweden
- Sparbanken Skåne Arena, a sports arena in Lund, Sweden
- Sparbanken Arena, a sports arena in Arboga, Sweden.
