= 2011 World Men's Handball Championship =

Världsmästerskapet i handboll för herrar 2011

Tournament details
- Host country: Sweden
- Venues: 8 (in 8 host cities)
- Dates: 13–30 January
- Teams: 24 (from 5 confederations)

Final positions
- Champions: France (4th title)
- Runners-up: Denmark
- Third place: Spain
- Fourth place: Sweden

Tournament statistics
- Matches played: 98
- Goals scored: 5,390 (55 per match)
- Attendance: 399,019 (4,072 per match)
- Top scorer: Mikkel Hansen (DEN) (68 goals)

Awards
- Best player: Nikola Karabatić (FRA)

The 2011 World Men's Handball Championship, the 22nd event hosted by the International Handball Federation, was held in Sweden from 13 to 30 January 2011. All matches were played in Malmö, Lund, Kristianstad, Gothenburg, Skövde, Jönköping, Linköping and Norrköping.

In the preliminary round, 24 teams from all the world's continents were split into 4 groups, with the first-placed 3 teams advancing through the main round in two groups, carrying the previously won points against the remaining teams. France won the tournament after defeating Denmark in the final, while Spain won the bronze medal after defeating Sweden in the third-place match. Thus, France has qualified for the tournament at the London Olympics. The teams that finished in 2nd–7th place will play Olympic Qualifying Tournaments.

The host broadcaster was the Swedish commercial network TV4 Sport and the television rights were sold to other countries.

One of the objectives of the championship was to create a multicultural party that extends far outside the handball arenas.

== Venues ==
Malmö	Gothenburg	Linköping	Norrköping
Malmö Arena	Scandinavium	Cloetta Center	Himmelstalundshallen
Capacity: 13,000	Capacity: 12,044	Capacity: 8,500	Capacity: 4,300
Jönköping	2011 World Men's Handball Championship is located in Southern Sweden		Skövde
Kinnarps Arena	2011 World Men's Handball Championship is located in Southern Sweden		Arena Skövde
Capacity: 7,000	2011 World Men's Handball Championship is located in Southern Sweden		Capacity: 2,500
Kristianstad	2011 World Men's Handball Championship is located in Southern Sweden		Lund
Kristianstad Arena	2011 World Men's Handball Championship is located in Southern Sweden		FFS Arena
Capacity: 4,700	2011 World Men's Handball Championship is located in Southern Sweden		Capacity: 3,000

== List of qualified teams ==
Bahrain and Chile qualified for their first ever handball World Championship. Austria qualified for the first time since 1993, which, coincidentally, was also hosted by Sweden.

The following 24 teams qualified for the final tournament:

EHF (14)

- Austria
- Croatia
- Denmark
- France
- Germany
- Hungary
- Iceland
- Norway
- Poland
- Romania
- Serbia
- Slovakia
- Spain
- Sweden (host)

CAHB (3)

- Algeria
- Egypt
- Tunisia

AHF (3)

- Bahrain
- Japan
- South Korea

PATHF (3)

- Argentina
- Brazil
- Chile

OHF (1)

- Australia

== Draw ==
The draw was held on 9 July 2010 at the Scandinavium at Gothenburg, Sweden.

Pot 1	Pot 2	Pot 3	Pot 4	Pot 5	Pot 6
Chile (3rd from America); Bahrain (2nd from Asia); Japan (3rd from Asia); Australia (Champions of Oceania)	Egypt (2nd from Africa); Argentina (champions of America); Algeria (3rd from Africa); Brazil (2nd from America)	Hungary (Euro playoff); Tunisia (Champions of Africa); Romania (Euro playoff); Slovakia (Euro playoff)	Serbia (Euro playoff); Austria (Euro playoff); Germany (Euro playoff); South Korea (Champions of Asia)	France (The defending World Champions); Croatia (2nd from Europe); Iceland (3rd from Europe); Poland (4th from Europe)	Denmark (Euro playoff); Spain (Euro playoff); Sweden host; Norway (Euro playoff)

== Squads ==
Each nation had to submit a squad of 16 players.

== Match officials ==
On 25 October 2010, the match officials for the tournament were confirmed.

Referees
Algeria	Kacem Mezian; Othmane Si Bachir
Argentina	Carlos Marina; Darío Minore
Brazil	Jesus Menezes; Rogério Pinto
Côte d'Ivoire	Yalatima Coulibaly; Mamadou Diabaté
Czech Republic	Václav Horáček; Jiří Novotný
Denmark	Per Olesen; Lars Ejby Pedersen
France	Nordine Lazaar; Laurent Reveret
Germany	Lars Geipel; Marcus Helbig
Iran	Mohsen Karbaschi; Majid Kolahdouzan

Referees
Macedonia	Gjorgji Načevski; Slavko Nikolov
Norway	Kenneth Abrahamsen; Arne Kristiansen
Romania	Bogdan Stark; Romeo Ştefan
Slovenia	Nenad Krstič; Peter Ljubič
Serbia	Nenad Nikolić; Dušan Stojković
Slovakia	Michal Baďura; Jaroslav Ondogrecula
Spain	Óscar López; Ángel Ramírez
Sweden	Rickard Canbro; Mikael Claesson
United Arab Emirates	Omar Al-Marzouqi; Mohammad Al-Nuaimi

== Preliminary round ==
Twenty-four participating teams were placed in the following four groups. After playing a round-robin, the top three teams in each group advanced to the Main Round. The last three teams in each group played placement matches.

=== Tie-breaking criteria ===
For the three game group stage of this tournament, where two or more teams in a group tied on an equal number of points, the finishing positions will be determined by the following tie-breaking criteria in the following order

1. number of points obtained in the matches among the teams in question
2. goal difference in the matches among the teams in question
3. number of goals scored in the matches among the teams in question (if more than two teams finish equal on points)
4. goal difference in all the group matches
5. number of goals scored in all the group matches
6. drawing of lots

Team advanced to Main Round

=== Group A (Kristianstad/Lund) ===
Team	Pld	W	D	L	GF	GA	GD	Pts
France	5	4	1	0	159	106	+53	9
Spain	5	4	1	0	139	110	+29	9
Germany	5	3	0	2	151	125	+26	6
Egypt	5	1	0	4	115	139	−24	2
Tunisia	5	1	0	4	114	137	−23	2
Bahrain	5	1	0	4	105	166	−61	2

All times are Central European Time (UTC+1)

14 January 2011; 18:00	France	32–19	Tunisia	Kristianstad Arena, Kristianstad; Attendance: 2,500; Referees: Olesen, Pedersen (DEN)
14 January 2011; 18:00	Karabatić 6	(15–9)	Megannem 6	Kristianstad Arena, Kristianstad; Attendance: 2,500; Referees: Olesen, Pedersen (DEN)
14 January 2011; 18:00	1× (yellow card) 4× (suspension) 1× (red card)	Report	2× (yellow card) 7× (suspension)	Kristianstad Arena, Kristianstad; Attendance: 2,500; Referees: Olesen, Pedersen (DEN)

14 January 2011; 18:15	Germany	30–25	Egypt	Färs och Frosta Sparbank Arena, Lund; Attendance: 1,410; Referees: Horáček, Novotný (CZE)
14 January 2011; 18:15	Gensheimer 9	(15–12)	El Ahmar 6	Färs och Frosta Sparbank Arena, Lund; Attendance: 1,410; Referees: Horáček, Novotný (CZE)
14 January 2011; 18:15	3× (yellow card) 2× (suspension)	Report	3× (yellow card) 2× (suspension)	Färs och Frosta Sparbank Arena, Lund; Attendance: 1,410; Referees: Horáček, Novotný (CZE)

14 January 2011; 20:15	Spain	33–22	Bahrain	Kristianstad Arena, Kristianstad; Referees: Menezes, Pinto (BRA)
14 January 2011; 20:15	Garabaya, Parrondo, García 4	(16–8)	Madan 5	Kristianstad Arena, Kristianstad; Referees: Menezes, Pinto (BRA)
14 January 2011; 20:15	2× (yellow card) 3× (suspension)	Report	3× (yellow card) 7× (suspension)	Kristianstad Arena, Kristianstad; Referees: Menezes, Pinto (BRA)

16 January 2011; 16:15	Bahrain	18–38	Germany	Kristianstad Arena, Kristianstad; Referees: Marina, Minore (ARG)
16 January 2011; 16:15	Al Sayyad, Madan 4	(9–20)	Kaufmann 9	Kristianstad Arena, Kristianstad; Referees: Marina, Minore (ARG)
16 January 2011; 16:15	2× (yellow card) 5× (suspension)	Report	3× (yellow card) 3× (suspension)	Kristianstad Arena, Kristianstad; Referees: Marina, Minore (ARG)

16 January 2011; 17:30	Tunisia	18–21	Spain	Färs och Frosta Sparbank Arena, Lund; Attendance: 1,820; Referees: Krstič, Ljubič (SLO)
16 January 2011; 17:30	Tej, Mgannem 4	(7–9)	Entrerríos 5	Färs och Frosta Sparbank Arena, Lund; Attendance: 1,820; Referees: Krstič, Ljubič (SLO)
16 January 2011; 17:30	3× (yellow card) 5× (suspension)	Report	3× (yellow card) 3× (suspension)	Färs och Frosta Sparbank Arena, Lund; Attendance: 1,820; Referees: Krstič, Ljubič (SLO)

16 January 2011; 18:45	Egypt	19–28	France	Kristianstad Arena, Kristianstad; Referees: Abrahamsen, Kristiansen (NOR)
16 January 2011; 18:45	El Ahmar 4	(8–12)	Guigou 5	Kristianstad Arena, Kristianstad; Referees: Abrahamsen, Kristiansen (NOR)
16 January 2011; 18:45	3× (yellow card) 5× (suspension)	Report	2× (yellow card) 4× (suspension)	Kristianstad Arena, Kristianstad; Referees: Abrahamsen, Kristiansen (NOR)

17 January 2011; 18:30	Spain	26–24	Germany	Kristianstad Arena, Kristianstad; Attendance: 3,247; Referees: Olesen, Pedersen (DEN)
17 January 2011; 18:30	Aguinagalde, Garcia, Romero 5	(13–13)	Gensheimer, Glandorf 4	Kristianstad Arena, Kristianstad; Attendance: 3,247; Referees: Olesen, Pedersen (DEN)
17 January 2011; 18:30	1× (yellow card) 7× (suspension)	Report	3× (yellow card) 9× (suspension) 2× (red card)	Kristianstad Arena, Kristianstad; Attendance: 3,247; Referees: Olesen, Pedersen (DEN)

17 January 2011; 20:30	France	41–17	Bahrain	Färs och Frosta Sparbank Arena, Lund; Referees: Al-Marzouqi, Al-Nuaimi (UAE)
17 January 2011; 20:30	Joli 11	(23–10)	Al Sayyad 3	Färs och Frosta Sparbank Arena, Lund; Referees: Al-Marzouqi, Al-Nuaimi (UAE)
17 January 2011; 20:30	3× (yellow card) 3× (suspension)	Report	2× (yellow card) 2× (suspension) 1× (red card)	Färs och Frosta Sparbank Arena, Lund; Referees: Al-Marzouqi, Al-Nuaimi (UAE)

17 January 2011; 20:45	Tunisia	23–27	Egypt	Kristianstad Arena, Kristianstad; Attendance: 3,247; Referees: Horáček, Novotný (CZE)
17 January 2011; 20:45	Ayed 7	(10–11)	El Ahmar 10	Kristianstad Arena, Kristianstad; Attendance: 3,247; Referees: Horáček, Novotný (CZE)
17 January 2011; 20:45	3× (yellow card) 10× (suspension) 1× (red card)	Report	3× (yellow card) 5× (suspension)	Kristianstad Arena, Kristianstad; Attendance: 3,247; Referees: Horáček, Novotný (CZE)

19 January 2011; 18:00	Bahrain	21–28	Tunisia	Färs och Frosta Sparbank Arena, Lund; Attendance: 950; Referees: Marina, Minore (ARG)
19 January 2011; 18:00	Al Sayyad 6	(12–15)	Tej 7	Färs och Frosta Sparbank Arena, Lund; Attendance: 950; Referees: Marina, Minore (ARG)
19 January 2011; 18:00	3× (yellow card) 5× (suspension)	Report	4× (yellow card) 5× (suspension)	Färs och Frosta Sparbank Arena, Lund; Attendance: 950; Referees: Marina, Minore (ARG)

19 January 2011; 18:15	Germany	23–30	France	Kristianstad Arena, Kristianstad; Attendance: 4,148; Referees: Horáček, Novotný (CZE)
19 January 2011; 18:15	Kaufmann 7	(10–13)	Accambray 5	Kristianstad Arena, Kristianstad; Attendance: 4,148; Referees: Horáček, Novotný (CZE)
19 January 2011; 18:15	3× (yellow card) 5× (suspension)	Report	3× (yellow card) 2× (suspension)	Kristianstad Arena, Kristianstad; Attendance: 4,148; Referees: Horáček, Novotný (CZE)

19 January 2011; 20:30	Spain	31–18	Egypt	Kristianstad Arena, Kristianstad; Attendance: 4,148; Referees: Krstič, Ljubič (SLO)
19 January 2011; 20:30	Rocas 7	(14–9)	Mamdouh 5	Kristianstad Arena, Kristianstad; Attendance: 4,148; Referees: Krstič, Ljubič (SLO)
19 January 2011; 20:30	2× (yellow card) 1× (suspension)	Report	3× (yellow card) 4× (suspension) 1× (red card)	Kristianstad Arena, Kristianstad; Attendance: 4,148; Referees: Krstič, Ljubič (SLO)

20 January 2011; 18:00	Egypt	26–27	Bahrain	Färs och Frosta Sparbank Arena, Lund; Attendance: 750; Referees: Karbaschi, Kolahdouzan (IRN)
20 January 2011; 18:00	Mabrouk 7	(16–15)	Al Sayyad 9	Färs och Frosta Sparbank Arena, Lund; Attendance: 750; Referees: Karbaschi, Kolahdouzan (IRN)
20 January 2011; 18:00	3× (yellow card) 4× (suspension)	Report	3× (yellow card) 3× (suspension)	Färs och Frosta Sparbank Arena, Lund; Attendance: 750; Referees: Karbaschi, Kolahdouzan (IRN)

20 January 2011; 18:30	Germany	36–26	Tunisia	Kristianstad Arena, Kristianstad; Attendance: 3,885; Referees: Baďura, Ondogrecula (SVK)
20 January 2011; 18:30	Hens 6	(15–12)	Mgannem 6	Kristianstad Arena, Kristianstad; Attendance: 3,885; Referees: Baďura, Ondogrecula (SVK)
20 January 2011; 18:30	3× (yellow card) 3× (suspension)	Report	3× (yellow card) 2× (suspension) 1× (red card)	Kristianstad Arena, Kristianstad; Attendance: 3,885; Referees: Baďura, Ondogrecula (SVK)

20 January 2011; 20:45	France	28–28	Spain	Kristianstad Arena, Kristianstad; Attendance: 3,885; Referees: Olesen, Pedersen (DEN)
20 January 2011; 20:45	Guigou 6	(18–13)	Entrerríos 7	Kristianstad Arena, Kristianstad; Attendance: 3,885; Referees: Olesen, Pedersen (DEN)
20 January 2011; 20:45	4× (yellow card) 4× (suspension)	Report	3× (yellow card) 4× (suspension)	Kristianstad Arena, Kristianstad; Attendance: 3,885; Referees: Olesen, Pedersen (DEN)

=== Group B (Norrköping/Linköping) ===
Team	Pld	W	D	L	GF	GA	GD	Pts
Iceland	5	5	0	0	157	119	+38	10
Hungary	5	4	0	1	148	133	+15	8
Norway	5	3	0	2	139	136	+3	6
Japan	5	2	0	3	141	161	−20	4
Austria	5	1	0	4	144	148	−4	2
Brazil	5	0	0	5	131	163	−32	0

All times are Central European Time (UTC+1)

14 January 2011; 17:00	Iceland	32–26	Hungary	Himmelstalundshallen, Norrköping; Attendance: 2,753; Referees: López, Ramírez (ESP)
14 January 2011; 17:00	Pálmarsson 8	(14–11)	Mocsai 5	Himmelstalundshallen, Norrköping; Attendance: 2,753; Referees: López, Ramírez (ESP)
14 January 2011; 17:00	3× (yellow card) 4× (suspension)	Report	3× (yellow card) 5× (suspension) 1× (red card)	Himmelstalundshallen, Norrköping; Attendance: 2,753; Referees: López, Ramírez (ESP)

14 January 2011; 19:10	Norway	35–29	Japan	Himmelstalundshallen, Norrköping; Attendance: 2,753; Referees: Mezian, Bachir (ALG)
14 January 2011; 19:10	Myrhol 9	(18–13)	Kadoyama 7	Himmelstalundshallen, Norrköping; Attendance: 2,753; Referees: Mezian, Bachir (ALG)
14 January 2011; 19:10	2× (yellow card) 8× (suspension)	Report	3× (yellow card) 1× (suspension)	Himmelstalundshallen, Norrköping; Attendance: 2,753; Referees: Mezian, Bachir (ALG)

14 January 2011; 21:30	Austria	34–24	Brazil	Himmelstalundshallen, Norrköping; Attendance: 2,753; Referees: Geipel, Helbig (GER)
14 January 2011; 21:30	Wilczynski 9	(17–13)	Bortolini, Santos 4	Himmelstalundshallen, Norrköping; Attendance: 2,753; Referees: Geipel, Helbig (GER)
14 January 2011; 21:30	3× (yellow card) 4× (suspension)	Report	3× (yellow card) 2× (suspension)	Himmelstalundshallen, Norrköping; Attendance: 2,753; Referees: Geipel, Helbig (GER)

15 January 2011; 16:30	Hungary	26–23	Norway	Himmelstalundshallen, Norrköping; Referees: Geipel, Helbig (GER)
15 January 2011; 16:30	Ilyés, G. Iváncsik, T. Iváncsik 5	(14–16)	Kjelling 7	Himmelstalundshallen, Norrköping; Referees: Geipel, Helbig (GER)
15 January 2011; 16:30	3× (yellow card) 2× (suspension)	Report	3× (yellow card) 4× (suspension)	Himmelstalundshallen, Norrköping; Referees: Geipel, Helbig (GER)

15 January 2011; 18:45	Japan	33–30	Austria	Himmelstalundshallen, Norrköping; Referees: López, Ramírez (ESP)
15 January 2011; 18:45	Miyazaki 8	(18–11)	Szilagyi 8	Himmelstalundshallen, Norrköping; Referees: López, Ramírez (ESP)
15 January 2011; 18:45	2× (yellow card) 3× (suspension)	Report	3× (yellow card) 2× (suspension)	Himmelstalundshallen, Norrköping; Referees: López, Ramírez (ESP)

15 January 2011; 21:00	Brazil	26–34	Iceland	Himmelstalundshallen, Norrköping; Referees: Canbro, Claesson (SWE)
15 January 2011; 21:00	Ribeiro 7	(12–19)	Sigurðsson 11	Himmelstalundshallen, Norrköping; Referees: Canbro, Claesson (SWE)
15 January 2011; 21:00	3× (yellow card) 2× (suspension)	Report	3× (yellow card) 3× (suspension)	Himmelstalundshallen, Norrköping; Referees: Canbro, Claesson (SWE)

17 January 2011; 17:00	Hungary	36–24	Brazil	Cloetta Center, Linköping; Referees: Nikolić, Stojković (SRB)
17 January 2011; 17:00	Harsányi 10	(18–11)	Bortolini 8	Cloetta Center, Linköping; Referees: Nikolić, Stojković (SRB)
17 January 2011; 17:00	3× (yellow card) 4× (suspension) 1× (red card)	Report	2× (yellow card) 4× (suspension)	Cloetta Center, Linköping; Referees: Nikolić, Stojković (SRB)

17 January 2011; 19:10	Norway	33–27	Austria	Cloetta Center, Linköping; Attendance: 2,700; Referees: Canbro, Claesson (SWE)
17 January 2011; 19:10	Tvedten 10	(16–11)	Božović 6	Cloetta Center, Linköping; Attendance: 2,700; Referees: Canbro, Claesson (SWE)
17 January 2011; 19:10	2× (yellow card) 3× (suspension)	Report	3× (yellow card) 3× (suspension)	Cloetta Center, Linköping; Attendance: 2,700; Referees: Canbro, Claesson (SWE)

17 January 2011; 21:30	Iceland	36–22	Japan	Cloetta Center, Linköping; Referees: Coulibaly, Diabaté (CIV)
17 January 2011; 21:30	Sigurðsson 9	(22–8)	Kadoyama 5	Cloetta Center, Linköping; Referees: Coulibaly, Diabaté (CIV)
17 January 2011; 21:30	3× (yellow card) 7× (suspension)	Report	2× (yellow card)	Cloetta Center, Linköping; Referees: Coulibaly, Diabaté (CIV)

18 January 2011; 17:00	Japan	24–28	Hungary	Cloetta Center, Linköping; Attendance: 1,800; Referees: Canbro, Claesson (SWE)
18 January 2011; 17:00	Miyazaki 5	(8–13)	G. Iváncsik 9	Cloetta Center, Linköping; Attendance: 1,800; Referees: Canbro, Claesson (SWE)
18 January 2011; 17:00	3× (yellow card)	Report	2× (yellow card) 3× (suspension) 1× (red card)	Cloetta Center, Linköping; Attendance: 1,800; Referees: Canbro, Claesson (SWE)

18 January 2011; 19:10	Norway	26–25	Brazil	Cloetta Center, Linköping; Attendance: 2,717; Referees: Coulibaly, Diabaté (CIV)
18 January 2011; 19:10	Myrhol 7	(13–12)	Pacheco 6	Cloetta Center, Linköping; Attendance: 2,717; Referees: Coulibaly, Diabaté (CIV)
18 January 2011; 19:10	3× (yellow card) 4× (suspension)	Report	3× (yellow card) 5× (suspension)	Cloetta Center, Linköping; Attendance: 2,717; Referees: Coulibaly, Diabaté (CIV)

18 January 2011; 21:30	Austria	23–26	Iceland	Cloetta Center, Linköping; Attendance: 2,612; Referees: Stark, Ştefan (ROU)
18 January 2011; 21:30	Weber 8	(16–11)	Petersson 7	Cloetta Center, Linköping; Attendance: 2,612; Referees: Stark, Ştefan (ROU)
18 January 2011; 21:30	3× (yellow card) 9× (suspension) 2× (red card)	Report	3× (yellow card) 5× (suspension)	Cloetta Center, Linköping; Attendance: 2,612; Referees: Stark, Ştefan (ROU)

20 January 2011; 17:00	Brazil	32–33	Japan	Cloetta Center, Linköping; Attendance: 4,252; Referees: Stark, Ştefan (ROU)
20 January 2011; 17:00	Teixeira 8	(12–13)	Suematsu 12	Cloetta Center, Linköping; Attendance: 4,252; Referees: Stark, Ştefan (ROU)
20 January 2011; 17:00	3× (yellow card) 3× (suspension)	Report	2× (yellow card) 3× (suspension)	Cloetta Center, Linköping; Attendance: 4,252; Referees: Stark, Ştefan (ROU)

20 January 2011; 19:10	Iceland	29–22	Norway	Cloetta Center, Linköping; Attendance: 5,817; Referees: Canbro, Claesson (SWE)
20 January 2011; 19:10	Guðjónsson 7	(12–12)	Tvedten 7	Cloetta Center, Linköping; Attendance: 5,817; Referees: Canbro, Claesson (SWE)
20 January 2011; 19:10	3× (yellow card) 5× (suspension)	Report	4× (yellow card) 5× (suspension)	Cloetta Center, Linköping; Attendance: 5,817; Referees: Canbro, Claesson (SWE)

20 January 2011; 21:30	Austria	30–32	Hungary	Cloetta Center, Linköping; Attendance: 2,340; Referees: Nikolić, Stojković (SRB)
20 January 2011; 21:30	Szilágyi 7	(16–13)	Császár, Törő 5	Cloetta Center, Linköping; Attendance: 2,340; Referees: Nikolić, Stojković (SRB)
20 January 2011; 21:30	2× (yellow card) 3× (suspension)	Report	4× (yellow card) 2× (suspension)	Cloetta Center, Linköping; Attendance: 2,340; Referees: Nikolić, Stojković (SRB)

=== Group C (Malmö/Lund) ===
Team	Pld	W	D	L	GF	GA	GD	Pts
Denmark	5	5	0	0	181	117	+64	10
Croatia	5	3	1	1	148	109	+39	7
Serbia	5	2	1	2	139	139	0	5
Algeria	5	2	0	3	100	109	−9	4
Romania	5	2	0	3	132	123	+9	4
Australia	5	0	0	5	77	180	−103	0

All times are Central European Time (UTC+1)

14 January 2011; 18:00	Croatia	27–21	Romania	Malmö Arena, Malmö; Attendance: 6,643; Referees: Lazaar, Reveret (FRA)
14 January 2011; 18:00	Strlek 8	(11–13)	Stamate 7	Malmö Arena, Malmö; Attendance: 6,643; Referees: Lazaar, Reveret (FRA)
14 January 2011; 18:00	3× (yellow card) 5× (suspension)	Report 1 Report 2	3× (yellow card) 5× (suspension)	Malmö Arena, Malmö; Attendance: 6,643; Referees: Lazaar, Reveret (FRA)

14 January 2011; 20:15	Denmark	47–12	Australia	Malmö Arena, Malmö; Attendance: 6,643; Referees: Marina, Minore (ARG)
14 January 2011; 20:15	Christiansen 8	(21–8)	Calvert 4	Malmö Arena, Malmö; Attendance: 6,643; Referees: Marina, Minore (ARG)
14 January 2011; 20:15	2× (yellow card) 2× (suspension)	Report	3× (yellow card) 5× (suspension)	Malmö Arena, Malmö; Attendance: 6,643; Referees: Marina, Minore (ARG)

14 January 2011; 20:45	Serbia	25–24	Algeria	Färs och Frosta Sparbank Arena, Lund; Attendance: 1,275; Referees: Al-Marzouqi, Al-Nuaimi (UAE)
14 January 2011; 20:45	Vujin 6	(13–9)	Berkous 7	Färs och Frosta Sparbank Arena, Lund; Attendance: 1,275; Referees: Al-Marzouqi, Al-Nuaimi (UAE)
14 January 2011; 20:45	3× (yellow card) 3× (suspension)	Report	3× (yellow card) 2× (suspension)	Färs och Frosta Sparbank Arena, Lund; Attendance: 1,275; Referees: Al-Marzouqi, Al-Nuaimi (UAE)

16 January 2011; 18:00	Australia	18–35	Serbia	Malmö Arena, Malmö; Attendance: 2,500; Referees: Karbaschi, Kolahdouzan (IRN)
16 January 2011; 18:00	Fletcher 5	(8–16)	Vujin 7	Malmö Arena, Malmö; Attendance: 2,500; Referees: Karbaschi, Kolahdouzan (IRN)
16 January 2011; 18:00	3× (yellow card) 6× (suspension)	Report	3× (yellow card) 7× (suspension)	Malmö Arena, Malmö; Attendance: 2,500; Referees: Karbaschi, Kolahdouzan (IRN)

16 January 2011; 20:00	Algeria	15–26	Croatia	Färs och Frosta Sparbank Arena, Lund; Attendance: 1,943; Referees: Menezes, Pinto (BRA)
16 January 2011; 20:00	Berkous, Boultif 4	(11–11)	Balić 6	Färs och Frosta Sparbank Arena, Lund; Attendance: 1,943; Referees: Menezes, Pinto (BRA)
16 January 2011; 20:00	3× (yellow card) 4× (suspension)	Report	3× (yellow card) 6× (suspension)	Färs och Frosta Sparbank Arena, Lund; Attendance: 1,943; Referees: Menezes, Pinto (BRA)

16 January 2011; 20:15	Romania	30–39	Denmark	Malmö Arena, Malmö; Attendance: 8,000; Referees: Baďura, Ondogrecula (SVK)
16 January 2011; 20:15	Florea 7	(16–17)	Christiansen 6	Malmö Arena, Malmö; Attendance: 8,000; Referees: Baďura, Ondogrecula (SVK)
16 January 2011; 20:15	3× (yellow card) 2× (suspension)	Report	3× (yellow card) 4× (suspension)	Malmö Arena, Malmö; Attendance: 8,000; Referees: Baďura, Ondogrecula (SVK)

17 January 2011; 18:00	Croatia	42–15	Australia	Malmö Arena, Malmö; Attendance: 1,500; Referees: Baďura, Ondogrecula (SVK)
17 January 2011; 18:00	Buntić 7	(19–9)	Calvert, Fletcher, Subotic 3	Malmö Arena, Malmö; Attendance: 1,500; Referees: Baďura, Ondogrecula (SVK)
17 January 2011; 18:00	1× (yellow card) 1× (suspension)	Report	3× (yellow card) 3× (suspension)	Malmö Arena, Malmö; Attendance: 1,500; Referees: Baďura, Ondogrecula (SVK)

17 January 2011; 18:00	Romania	14–15	Algeria	Färs och Frosta Sparbank Arena, Lund; Attendance: 920; Referees: Abrahamsen, Kristiansen (NOR)
17 January 2011; 18:00	Ghionea 7	(10–8)	Berkous, Boultif 4	Färs och Frosta Sparbank Arena, Lund; Attendance: 920; Referees: Abrahamsen, Kristiansen (NOR)
17 January 2011; 18:00	2× (yellow card) 4× (suspension)	Report	2× (yellow card) 5× (suspension)	Färs och Frosta Sparbank Arena, Lund; Attendance: 920; Referees: Abrahamsen, Kristiansen (NOR)

17 January 2011; 20:15	Denmark	35–27	Serbia	Malmö Arena, Malmö; Attendance: 8,164; Referees: Lazaar, Reveret (FRA)
17 January 2011; 20:15	Hansen 11	(16–14)	Vujin 7	Malmö Arena, Malmö; Attendance: 8,164; Referees: Lazaar, Reveret (FRA)
17 January 2011; 20:15	3× (yellow card) 2× (suspension)	Report	3× (yellow card) 6× (suspension)	Malmö Arena, Malmö; Attendance: 8,164; Referees: Lazaar, Reveret (FRA)

19 January 2011; 18:00	Serbia	24–24	Croatia	Malmö Arena, Malmö; Attendance: 7,269; Referees: Abrahamsen, Kristiansen (NOR)
19 January 2011; 18:00	Nikčević 7	(13–12)	Vori 8	Malmö Arena, Malmö; Attendance: 7,269; Referees: Abrahamsen, Kristiansen (NOR)
19 January 2011; 18:00	4× (yellow card) 4× (suspension)	Report	3× (yellow card) 2× (suspension)	Malmö Arena, Malmö; Attendance: 7,269; Referees: Abrahamsen, Kristiansen (NOR)

19 January 2011; 20:15	Denmark	26–19	Algeria	Malmö Arena, Malmö; Attendance: 8,830; Referees: Karbaschi, Kolahdouzan (IRN)
19 January 2011; 20:15	Hansen, Hansen 5	(16–9)	Boultif 5	Malmö Arena, Malmö; Attendance: 8,830; Referees: Karbaschi, Kolahdouzan (IRN)
19 January 2011; 20:15	3× (yellow card) 4× (suspension)	Report	2× (yellow card) 6× (suspension)	Malmö Arena, Malmö; Attendance: 8,830; Referees: Karbaschi, Kolahdouzan (IRN)

19 January 2011; 20:30	Australia	14–29	Romania	Färs och Frosta Sparbank Arena, Lund; Attendance: 800; Referees: Menezes, Pinto (BRA)
19 January 2011; 20:30	Calvert 7	(6–14)	Florea 5	Färs och Frosta Sparbank Arena, Lund; Attendance: 800; Referees: Menezes, Pinto (BRA)
19 January 2011; 20:30	3× (yellow card) 4× (suspension)	Report	2× (yellow card) 4× (suspension)	Färs och Frosta Sparbank Arena, Lund; Attendance: 800; Referees: Menezes, Pinto (BRA)

20 January 2011; 18:00	Algeria	27–18	Australia	Malmö Arena, Malmö; Attendance: 4,960; Referees: Al-Marzouqi, Al-Nuaimi (UAE)
20 January 2011; 18:00	Berkous, Ayat, Hamad 5	(12–11)	Fletcher 6	Malmö Arena, Malmö; Attendance: 4,960; Referees: Al-Marzouqi, Al-Nuaimi (UAE)
20 January 2011; 18:00	3× (yellow card) 1× (suspension)	Report	2× (yellow card) 2× (suspension)	Malmö Arena, Malmö; Attendance: 4,960; Referees: Al-Marzouqi, Al-Nuaimi (UAE)

20 January 2011; 20:15	Croatia	29–34	Denmark	Malmö Arena, Malmö; Attendance: 11,307; Referees: Lazaar, Reveret (FRA)
20 January 2011; 20:15	Zrnić 8	(16–15)	Søndergaard 10	Malmö Arena, Malmö; Attendance: 11,307; Referees: Lazaar, Reveret (FRA)
20 January 2011; 20:15	4× (yellow card) 4× (suspension)	Report	3× (yellow card) 3× (suspension)	Malmö Arena, Malmö; Attendance: 11,307; Referees: Lazaar, Reveret (FRA)

20 January 2011; 20:30	Serbia	28–38	Romania	Färs och Frosta Sparbank Arena, Lund; Attendance: 860; Referees: Krstič, Ljubič (SLO)
20 January 2011; 20:30	Ilić 6	(17–20)	Stamate 9	Färs och Frosta Sparbank Arena, Lund; Attendance: 860; Referees: Krstič, Ljubič (SLO)
20 January 2011; 20:30	3× (yellow card) 4× (suspension)	Report	2× (yellow card) 2× (suspension)	Färs och Frosta Sparbank Arena, Lund; Attendance: 860; Referees: Krstič, Ljubič (SLO)

=== Group D (Gothenburg) ===
Team	Pld	W	D	L	GF	GA	GD	Pts
Sweden	5	4	0	1	142	112	+30	8
Poland	5	4	0	1	143	123	+20	8
Argentina	5	3	1	1	133	114	+19	7
South Korea	5	2	1	2	137	128	+9	5
Slovakia	5	0	1	4	128	156	−28	1
Chile	5	0	1	4	117	167	−50	1

All times are Central European Time (UTC+1)

13 January 2011; 20:15	Sweden	28–18	Chile	Scandinavium, Gothenburg; Attendance: 10,368; Referees: Nikolić, Stojković (SRB)
13 January 2011; 20:15	Du Rietz 6	(15–8)	Feuchtmann 4	Scandinavium, Gothenburg; Attendance: 10,368; Referees: Nikolić, Stojković (SRB)
13 January 2011; 20:15	3× (yellow card) 6× (suspension)	Report	3× (yellow card) 2× (suspension)	Scandinavium, Gothenburg; Attendance: 10,368; Referees: Nikolić, Stojković (SRB)

14 January 2011; 18:15	South Korea	25–25	Argentina	Scandinavium, Gothenburg; Attendance: 1,733; Referees: Stark, Ştefan (ROU)
14 January 2011; 18:15	Lee J. W. 9	(14–11)	Fernandez 5	Scandinavium, Gothenburg; Attendance: 1,733; Referees: Stark, Ştefan (ROU)
14 January 2011; 18:15	3× (yellow card) 6× (suspension)	Report	2× (yellow card) 6× (suspension)	Scandinavium, Gothenburg; Attendance: 1,733; Referees: Stark, Ştefan (ROU)

14 January 2011; 20:15	Poland	35–33	Slovakia	Scandinavium, Gothenburg; Attendance: 2,486; Referees: Načevski, Nikolov (MKD)
14 January 2011; 20:15	Tłuczyński 7	(15–17)	Stranovský 9	Scandinavium, Gothenburg; Attendance: 2,486; Referees: Načevski, Nikolov (MKD)
14 January 2011; 20:15	3× (yellow card) 6× (suspension)	Report	3× (yellow card) 3× (suspension)	Scandinavium, Gothenburg; Attendance: 2,486; Referees: Načevski, Nikolov (MKD)

15 January 2011; 16:15	Chile	22–37	South Korea	Scandinavium, Gothenburg; Attendance: 7,727; Referees: Coulibaly, Diabaté (CIV)
15 January 2011; 16:15	Feuchtmann 8	(12–15)	Yu Dong Geun 9	Scandinavium, Gothenburg; Attendance: 7,727; Referees: Coulibaly, Diabaté (CIV)
15 January 2011; 16:15	2× (yellow card) 5× (suspension)	Report	2× (yellow card) 4× (suspension)	Scandinavium, Gothenburg; Attendance: 7,727; Referees: Coulibaly, Diabaté (CIV)

15 January 2011; 18:15	Slovakia	22–38	Sweden	Scandinavium, Gothenburg; Attendance: 11,491; Referees: Stark, Ştefan (ROU)
15 January 2011; 18:15	Kukucka 4	(14–15)	Ekberg 8	Scandinavium, Gothenburg; Attendance: 11,491; Referees: Stark, Ştefan (ROU)
15 January 2011; 18:15	3× (yellow card) 4× (suspension)	Report	3× (yellow card) 6× (suspension)	Scandinavium, Gothenburg; Attendance: 11,491; Referees: Stark, Ştefan (ROU)

15 January 2011; 20:15	Argentina	23–24	Poland	Scandinavium, Gothenburg; Attendance: 7,996; Referees: Nikolić, Stojković (SRB)
15 January 2011; 20:15	Simonet, Vieyra 6	(6–11)	Tłuczyński 5	Scandinavium, Gothenburg; Attendance: 7,996; Referees: Nikolić, Stojković (SRB)
15 January 2011; 20:15	3× (yellow card) 6× (suspension) 1× (red card)	Report	3× (yellow card) 7× (suspension) 1× (red card)	Scandinavium, Gothenburg; Attendance: 7,996; Referees: Nikolić, Stojković (SRB)

17 January 2011; 16:15	Slovakia	18–23	Argentina	Scandinavium, Gothenburg; Attendance: 3,057; Referees: Geipel, Helbig (GER)
17 January 2011; 16:15	Valo, Straňovský 4	(9–7)	Fernández 9	Scandinavium, Gothenburg; Attendance: 3,057; Referees: Geipel, Helbig (GER)
17 January 2011; 16:15	3× (yellow card) 4× (suspension)	Report	2× (yellow card) 3× (suspension)	Scandinavium, Gothenburg; Attendance: 3,057; Referees: Geipel, Helbig (GER)

17 January 2011; 18:15	Poland	38–23	Chile	Scandinavium, Gothenburg; Attendance: 5,535; Referees: Mezian, Si Bachir (ALG)
17 January 2011; 18:15	Jurasik, Tłuczyński 6	(15–13)	Feuchtmann, Muñoz 6	Scandinavium, Gothenburg; Attendance: 5,535; Referees: Mezian, Si Bachir (ALG)
17 January 2011; 18:15	3× (yellow card) 5× (suspension) 1× (red card)	Report	3× (yellow card) 3× (suspension)	Scandinavium, Gothenburg; Attendance: 5,535; Referees: Mezian, Si Bachir (ALG)

17 January 2011; 20:15	Sweden	30–24	South Korea	Scandinavium, Gothenburg; Attendance: 8,109; Referees: Načevski, Nikolov (MKD)
17 January 2011; 20:15	Källman 8	(14–12)	Yu Dong Geun 7	Scandinavium, Gothenburg; Attendance: 8,109; Referees: Načevski, Nikolov (MKD)
17 January 2011; 20:15	4× (yellow card) 11× (suspension) 1× (red card)	Report	3× (yellow card) 4× (suspension)	Scandinavium, Gothenburg; Attendance: 8,109; Referees: Načevski, Nikolov (MKD)

18 January 2011; 16:15	Chile	29–29	Slovakia	Scandinavium, Gothenburg; Attendance: 3,112; Referees: Načevski, Nikolov (MKD)
18 January 2011; 16:15	Feuchtmann 11	(15–12)	Šulc 7	Scandinavium, Gothenburg; Attendance: 3,112; Referees: Načevski, Nikolov (MKD)
18 January 2011; 16:15	3× (yellow card) 3× (suspension) 1× (red card)	Report	4× (yellow card) 5× (suspension)	Scandinavium, Gothenburg; Attendance: 3,112; Referees: Načevski, Nikolov (MKD)

18 January 2011; 18:15	South Korea	20–25	Poland	Scandinavium, Gothenburg; Attendance: 6,001; Referees: Geipel, Helbig (GER)
18 January 2011; 18:15	Yu Dong Geun 5	(11–10)	Tkaczyk, Jurecki 5	Scandinavium, Gothenburg; Attendance: 6,001; Referees: Geipel, Helbig (GER)
18 January 2011; 18:15	2× (yellow card) 3× (suspension)	Report	3× (yellow card) 3× (suspension) 1× (red card)	Scandinavium, Gothenburg; Attendance: 6,001; Referees: Geipel, Helbig (GER)

18 January 2011; 20:15	Sweden	22–27	Argentina	Scandinavium, Gothenburg; Attendance: 9,044; Referees: López, Ramírez (ESP)
18 January 2011; 20:15	Larholm 5	(10–12)	Pizarro 6	Scandinavium, Gothenburg; Attendance: 9,044; Referees: López, Ramírez (ESP)
18 January 2011; 20:15	3× (yellow card) 2× (suspension)	Report	4× (yellow card) 4× (suspension)	Scandinavium, Gothenburg; Attendance: 9,044; Referees: López, Ramírez (ESP)

20 January 2011; 16:15	South Korea	31–26	Slovakia	Scandinavium, Gothenburg; Attendance: 2,922; Referees: López, Ramírez (ESP)
20 January 2011; 16:15	Jeong Yi Kyeong, Lee Jae Woo 8	(14–10)	Antl 9	Scandinavium, Gothenburg; Attendance: 2,922; Referees: López, Ramírez (ESP)
20 January 2011; 16:15	2× (yellow card) 4× (suspension) 1× (red card)	Report	3× (yellow card) 6× (suspension) 1× (red card)	Scandinavium, Gothenburg; Attendance: 2,922; Referees: López, Ramírez (ESP)

20 January 2011; 18:15	Argentina	35–25	Chile	Scandinavium, Gothenburg; Attendance: 7,760; Referees: Mezian, Si Bachir (ALG)
20 January 2011; 18:15	Pizarro 9	(15–13)	Feuchtmann 7	Scandinavium, Gothenburg; Attendance: 7,760; Referees: Mezian, Si Bachir (ALG)
20 January 2011; 18:15	3× (yellow card) 8× (suspension)	Report	4× (yellow card) 4× (suspension) 1× (red card)	Scandinavium, Gothenburg; Attendance: 7,760; Referees: Mezian, Si Bachir (ALG)

20 January 2011; 20:15	Poland	21–24	Sweden	Scandinavium, Gothenburg; Attendance: 11,606; Referees: Geipel, Helbig (GER)
20 January 2011; 20:15	Lijewski 6	(12–14)	Larholm 5	Scandinavium, Gothenburg; Attendance: 11,606; Referees: Geipel, Helbig (GER)
20 January 2011; 20:15	2× (yellow card) 4× (suspension)	Report	3× (yellow card) 5× (suspension)	Scandinavium, Gothenburg; Attendance: 11,606; Referees: Geipel, Helbig (GER)

== Main round ==
The top three teams of every preliminary group advanced to the Main round. Every team kept the points from preliminary round matches against teams who also advanced. In the main round every team had 3 games against the opponents they did not face in the preliminary round. The top two of every group advanced to the Semifinals, the other teams played placement matches.

Team advances to the Semifinals

=== Group I (Jönköping) ===
Team	Pld	W	D	L	GF	GA	GD	Pts
France	5	4	1	0	160	129	+31	9
Spain	5	4	1	0	148	127	+21	9
Iceland	5	2	0	3	137	141	−4	4
Hungary	5	2	0	3	127	147	−20	4
Norway	5	1	0	4	133	143	−10	2
Germany	5	1	0	4	124	142	−18	2

All times are Central European Time (UTC+1)

22 January; 16:15	Spain	32–27	Norway	Kinnarps Arena, Jönköping; Attendance: 5,451; Referees: Stark, Ştefan (ROU)
22 January; 16:15	Romero 7	(15–12)	Myrhol 8	Kinnarps Arena, Jönköping; Attendance: 5,451; Referees: Stark, Ştefan (ROU)
22 January; 16:15	3× (yellow card) 2× (suspension)	Report	3× (yellow card) 3× (suspension)	Kinnarps Arena, Jönköping; Attendance: 5,451; Referees: Stark, Ştefan (ROU)

22 January; 18:30	Germany	27–24	Iceland	Kinnarps Arena, Jönköping; Attendance: 5,670; Referees: Nikolić, Stojković (SRB)
22 January; 18:30	Preiß, Sprenger 5	(15–13)	Petersson 7	Kinnarps Arena, Jönköping; Attendance: 5,670; Referees: Nikolić, Stojković (SRB)
22 January; 18:30	3× (yellow card) 3× (suspension)	Report	3× (yellow card) 2× (suspension)	Kinnarps Arena, Jönköping; Attendance: 5,670; Referees: Nikolić, Stojković (SRB)

22 January; 20:45	France	37–24	Hungary	Kinnarps Arena, Jönköping; Attendance: 2,393; Referees: Krstič, Ljubič (SLO)
22 January; 20:45	Karabatić 7	(18–13)	Mocsai 7	Kinnarps Arena, Jönköping; Attendance: 2,393; Referees: Krstič, Ljubič (SLO)
22 January; 20:45	3× (yellow card) 2× (suspension)	Report	3× (yellow card) 4× (suspension) 1× (red card)	Kinnarps Arena, Jönköping; Attendance: 2,393; Referees: Krstič, Ljubič (SLO)

24 January; 16:00	Iceland	24–32	Spain	Kinnarps Arena, Jönköping; Attendance: 3,922; Referees: Krstič, Ljubič (SLO)
24 January; 16:00	Petersson 5	(10–20)	Gurbindo, Entrerrios 6	Kinnarps Arena, Jönköping; Attendance: 3,922; Referees: Krstič, Ljubič (SLO)
24 January; 16:00	3× (yellow card) 7× (suspension)	Report	3× (yellow card) 4× (suspension) 1× (red card)	Kinnarps Arena, Jönköping; Attendance: 3,922; Referees: Krstič, Ljubič (SLO)

24 January; 18:15	Hungary	27–25	Germany	Kinnarps Arena, Jönköping; Attendance: 3,963; Referees: Olesen, Pedersen (DEN)
24 January; 18:15	G Iváncsik, T Iváncsik, Perez 5	(10–12)	Glandorf 5	Kinnarps Arena, Jönköping; Attendance: 3,963; Referees: Olesen, Pedersen (DEN)
24 January; 18:15	3× (yellow card) 5× (suspension)	Report	3× (yellow card) 4× (suspension)	Kinnarps Arena, Jönköping; Attendance: 3,963; Referees: Olesen, Pedersen (DEN)

24 January; 20:30	Norway	26–31	France	Kinnarps Arena, Jönköping; Attendance: 3,847; Referees: Menezes, Pinto (BRA)
24 January; 20:30	Hansen 8	(14–17)	Gille, Accambray, Abalo 5	Kinnarps Arena, Jönköping; Attendance: 3,847; Referees: Menezes, Pinto (BRA)
24 January; 20:30	3× (yellow card) 5× (suspension)	Report	2× (yellow card) 1× (suspension)	Kinnarps Arena, Jönköping; Attendance: 3,847; Referees: Menezes, Pinto (BRA)

25 January; 16:15	Germany	25–35	Norway	Kinnarps Arena, Jönköping; Attendance: 4,205; Referees: Stark, Ştefan (ROU)
25 January; 16:15	Kraus 6	(13–17)	Tvedten 8	Kinnarps Arena, Jönköping; Attendance: 4,205; Referees: Stark, Ştefan (ROU)
25 January; 16:15	3× (yellow card) 5× (suspension)	Report	3× (yellow card) 6× (suspension)	Kinnarps Arena, Jönköping; Attendance: 4,205; Referees: Stark, Ştefan (ROU)

25 January; 18:30	Spain	30–24	Hungary	Kinnarps Arena, Jönköping; Attendance: 4,236; Referees: Canbro, Claesson (SWE)
25 January; 18:30	Romero 9	(13–13)	Zubai 5	Kinnarps Arena, Jönköping; Attendance: 4,236; Referees: Canbro, Claesson (SWE)
25 January; 18:30	3× (yellow card) 2× (suspension)	Report	3× (yellow card) 5× (suspension)	Kinnarps Arena, Jönköping; Attendance: 4,236; Referees: Canbro, Claesson (SWE)

25 January; 20:45	France	34–28	Iceland	Kinnarps Arena, Jönköping; Attendance: 4,258; Referees: Načevski, Nikolov (MKD)
25 January; 20:45	Karabatić 7	(16–13)	Petersson 6	Kinnarps Arena, Jönköping; Attendance: 4,258; Referees: Načevski, Nikolov (MKD)
25 January; 20:45	3× (yellow card) 3× (suspension)	Report	4× (yellow card) 5× (suspension) 1× (red card)	Kinnarps Arena, Jönköping; Attendance: 4,258; Referees: Načevski, Nikolov (MKD)

=== Group II (Malmö/Lund) ===
Team	Pld	W	D	L	GF	GA	GD	Pts
Denmark	5	5	0	0	155	131	+24	10
Sweden	5	3	0	2	127	124	+3	6
Croatia	5	2	1	2	142	129	+13	5
Poland	5	2	0	3	123	129	−6	4
Serbia	5	1	1	3	127	139	−12	3
Argentina	5	1	0	4	117	139	−22	2

All times are Central European Time (UTC+1)

22 January; 18:15	Croatia	36–18	Argentina	Färs och Frosta Sparbank Arena, Lund; Attendance: 1,050; Referees: Baďura, Ondogrecula (SVK)
22 January; 18:15	Zrnić, Buntić 7	(19–6)	Simonet 5	Färs och Frosta Sparbank Arena, Lund; Attendance: 1,050; Referees: Baďura, Ondogrecula (SVK)
22 January; 18:15	3× (yellow card) 6× (suspension)	Report	2× (yellow card) 1× (suspension)	Färs och Frosta Sparbank Arena, Lund; Attendance: 1,050; Referees: Baďura, Ondogrecula (SVK)

22 January; 18:15	Serbia	24–28	Sweden	Malmö Arena, Malmö; Attendance: 9,213; Referees: Abrahamsen, Kristiansen (NOR)
22 January; 18:15	Vujin 8	(13–12)	Ekberg, Ekdahl Du Rietz 6	Malmö Arena, Malmö; Attendance: 9,213; Referees: Abrahamsen, Kristiansen (NOR)
22 January; 18:15	3× (yellow card) 5× (suspension) 1× (red card)	Report	3× (yellow card) 4× (suspension)	Malmö Arena, Malmö; Attendance: 9,213; Referees: Abrahamsen, Kristiansen (NOR)

22 January; 20:15	Denmark	28–27	Poland	Malmö Arena, Malmö; Attendance: 11,140; Referees: Horáček, Novotný (CZE)
22 January; 20:15	Lindberg 6	(15–9)	Tluczynski, Jurkiewicz 6	Malmö Arena, Malmö; Attendance: 11,140; Referees: Horáček, Novotný (CZE)
22 January; 20:15	3× (yellow card) 2× (suspension)	Report	3× (yellow card) 1× (suspension)	Malmö Arena, Malmö; Attendance: 11,140; Referees: Horáček, Novotný (CZE)

23 January; 18:15	Sweden	29–25	Croatia	Malmö Arena, Malmö; Attendance: 9,551; Referees: López, Ramírez (ESP)
23 January; 18:15	Doder 8	(14–12)	Zrnić 9	Malmö Arena, Malmö; Attendance: 9,551; Referees: López, Ramírez (ESP)
23 January; 18:15	3× (yellow card) 7× (suspension)	Report	3× (yellow card) 4× (suspension)	Malmö Arena, Malmö; Attendance: 9,551; Referees: López, Ramírez (ESP)

23 January; 20:15	Argentina	24–31	Denmark	Malmö Arena, Malmö; Attendance: 10,924; Referees: Coulibaly, Diabaté (CIV)
23 January; 20:15	Ferro, Vidal, Carou 3	(12–17)	Hansen 7	Malmö Arena, Malmö; Attendance: 10,924; Referees: Coulibaly, Diabaté (CIV)
23 January; 20:15	2× (yellow card) 6× (suspension) 1× (red card)	Report	3× (yellow card) 5× (suspension) 1× (red card)	Malmö Arena, Malmö; Attendance: 10,924; Referees: Coulibaly, Diabaté (CIV)

23 January; 20:15	Poland	27–26	Serbia	Färs och Frosta Sparbank Arena, Lund; Attendance: 1,730; Referees: Lazaar, Reveret (FRA)
23 January; 20:15	Tłuczyński 10	(10–11)	Vujin 11	Färs och Frosta Sparbank Arena, Lund; Attendance: 1,730; Referees: Lazaar, Reveret (FRA)
23 January; 20:15	3× (yellow card) 5× (suspension)	Report	3× (yellow card) 8× (suspension)	Färs och Frosta Sparbank Arena, Lund; Attendance: 1,730; Referees: Lazaar, Reveret (FRA)

25 January; 18:15	Croatia	28–24	Poland	Malmö Arena, Malmö; Attendance: 8,900; Referees: Baďura, Ondogrecula (SVK)
25 January; 18:15	Buntić 7	(13–11)	Jaszka, Tłuczyński 4	Malmö Arena, Malmö; Attendance: 8,900; Referees: Baďura, Ondogrecula (SVK)
25 January; 18:15	2× (yellow card) 8× (suspension)	Report	3× (yellow card) 3× (suspension)	Malmö Arena, Malmö; Attendance: 8,900; Referees: Baďura, Ondogrecula (SVK)

25 January; 20:15	Serbia	26–25	Argentina	Färs och Frosta Sparbank Arena, Lund; Attendance: 1,030; Referees: Geipel, Helbig (GER)
25 January; 20:15	Vujin, Ilić 6	(15–13)	Fernández, Kogovsek 5	Färs och Frosta Sparbank Arena, Lund; Attendance: 1,030; Referees: Geipel, Helbig (GER)
25 January; 20:15	3× (yellow card) 5× (suspension) 1× (red card)	Report	3× (yellow card) 1× (suspension)	Färs och Frosta Sparbank Arena, Lund; Attendance: 1,030; Referees: Geipel, Helbig (GER)

25 January; 20:15	Denmark	27–24	Sweden	Malmö Arena, Malmö; Attendance: 11,587; Referees: Abrahamsen, Kristiansen (NOR)
25 January; 20:15	Christiansen 6	(17–11)	Du Rietz 5	Malmö Arena, Malmö; Attendance: 11,587; Referees: Abrahamsen, Kristiansen (NOR)
25 January; 20:15	3× (yellow card) 4× (suspension)	Report	3× (yellow card) 3× (suspension)	Malmö Arena, Malmö; Attendance: 11,587; Referees: Abrahamsen, Kristiansen (NOR)

== Presidents Cup ==
=== Preliminary round ===
22 January; 14:00	Egypt	34–28	Japan	Arena Skövde, Skövde; Attendance: 1,634; Referees: Menezes, Pinto (BRA)
22 January; 14:00	Mabrouk 8	(17–14)	Suematsu 7	Arena Skövde, Skövde; Attendance: 1,634; Referees: Menezes, Pinto (BRA)
22 January; 14:00	4× (yellow card) 4× (suspension)	Report	3× (yellow card) 4× (suspension)	Arena Skövde, Skövde; Attendance: 1,634; Referees: Menezes, Pinto (BRA)

22 January; 14:00	Tunisia	25–26	Austria	Kristianstad Arena, Kristianstad; Referees: Marina, Minore (ARG)
22 January; 14:00	Alouini 6	(14–12)	Weber 6	Kristianstad Arena, Kristianstad; Referees: Marina, Minore (ARG)
22 January; 14:00	3× (yellow card) 1× (suspension)	Report	4× (yellow card) 6× (suspension)	Kristianstad Arena, Kristianstad; Referees: Marina, Minore (ARG)

22 January; 16:00	Australia	21–29	Chile	Malmö Arena, Malmö; Attendance: 1,766; Referees: Lazaar, Reveret (FRA)
22 January; 16:00	Parmenter 6	(6–17)	Muñoz, Chavez 5	Malmö Arena, Malmö; Attendance: 1,766; Referees: Lazaar, Reveret (FRA)
22 January; 16:00	3× (yellow card) 7× (suspension)	Report	3× (yellow card) 8× (suspension)	Malmö Arena, Malmö; Attendance: 1,766; Referees: Lazaar, Reveret (FRA)

22 January
16:30
Algeria
24–29 (ET)
South Korea
Arena Skövde, Skövde
Attendance: 1,711
Referees: Karbaschi, Kolahdouzan (IRN)
Labane, Hamad, Layadi, Daoud 4
(12–17)
Yu Dong Geun 8
3× (yellow card) 1× (suspension)
Report
3× (yellow card) 3× (suspension)

FT: 23–23 ET: 1–6

22 January; 16:30	Romania	33–38	Slovakia	Kristianstad Arena, Kristianstad; Attendance: 2,490; Referees: Coulibaly, Diabaté (CIV)
22 January; 16:30	Ghionea, Stamate 8	(19–22)	Kukučka 7	Kristianstad Arena, Kristianstad; Attendance: 2,490; Referees: Coulibaly, Diabaté (CIV)
22 January; 16:30	3× (yellow card) 4× (suspension)	Report	3× (yellow card) 4× (suspension)	Kristianstad Arena, Kristianstad; Attendance: 2,490; Referees: Coulibaly, Diabaté (CIV)

22 January; 20:30	Bahrain	30–37	Brazil	FFS Arena, Lund; Attendance: 550; Referees: López, Ramírez (ESP)
22 January; 20:30	Almaqabi 6	(15–17)	Chiuffa 6	FFS Arena, Lund; Attendance: 550; Referees: López, Ramírez (ESP)
22 January; 20:30	3× (yellow card) 5× (suspension)	Report	3× (yellow card) 3× (suspension)	FFS Arena, Lund; Attendance: 550; Referees: López, Ramírez (ESP)

=== 23rd-place match ===
23 January; 16:00	Australia	23–33	Bahrain	Malmö Arena, Malmö; Attendance: 724; Referees: Geipel, Helbig (GER)
23 January; 16:00	Blondell 6	(11–19)	Merza 7	Malmö Arena, Malmö; Attendance: 724; Referees: Geipel, Helbig (GER)
23 January; 16:00	2× (yellow card) 3× (suspension)	Report	2× (yellow card)	Malmö Arena, Malmö; Attendance: 724; Referees: Geipel, Helbig (GER)

=== 21st-place match ===
23 January; 18:00	Chile	18–28	Brazil	FFS Arena, Lund; Attendance: 650; Referees: Baďura, Ondogrecula (SVK)
23 January; 18:00	Feuchtmann 7	(11–13)	Ribeiro 6	FFS Arena, Lund; Attendance: 650; Referees: Baďura, Ondogrecula (SVK)
23 January; 18:00	4× (yellow card) 2× (suspension)	Report	3× (yellow card) 3× (suspension) 1× (red card)	FFS Arena, Lund; Attendance: 650; Referees: Baďura, Ondogrecula (SVK)

=== 19th-place match ===
23 January; 14:00	Tunisia	29–30	Romania	Kristianstad Arena, Kristianstad; Attendance: 900; Referees: Abrahamsen, Kristiansen (NOR)
23 January; 14:00	Hedoui 9	(14–17)	Florea, Stamate 8	Kristianstad Arena, Kristianstad; Attendance: 900; Referees: Abrahamsen, Kristiansen (NOR)
23 January; 14:00	4× (yellow card) 4× (suspension)	Report	3× (yellow card) 3× (suspension)	Kristianstad Arena, Kristianstad; Attendance: 900; Referees: Abrahamsen, Kristiansen (NOR)

=== 17th-place match ===
23 January; 16:30	Austria	35–39	Slovakia	Kristianstad Arena, Kristianstad; Attendance: 1,546; Referees: Al-Marzouqi, Al-Nuaimi (UAE)
23 January; 16:30	Szilágyi 7	(18–19)	Kopčo 8	Kristianstad Arena, Kristianstad; Attendance: 1,546; Referees: Al-Marzouqi, Al-Nuaimi (UAE)
23 January; 16:30	3× (yellow card) 3× (suspension)	Report	3× (yellow card) 1× (suspension)	Kristianstad Arena, Kristianstad; Attendance: 1,546; Referees: Al-Marzouqi, Al-Nuaimi (UAE)

=== 15th-place match ===
24 January; 18:00	Japan	24–29	Algeria	Arena Skövde, Skövde; Attendance: 1,510; Referees: Načevski, Nikolov (MKD)
24 January; 18:00	Kaido 6	(13–13)	Zouaoui 8	Arena Skövde, Skövde; Attendance: 1,510; Referees: Načevski, Nikolov (MKD)
24 January; 18:00	3× (yellow card) 1× (suspension)	Report	2× (yellow card) 3× (suspension)	Arena Skövde, Skövde; Attendance: 1,510; Referees: Načevski, Nikolov (MKD)

=== 13th-place match ===
24 January; 20:30	Egypt	23–26	South Korea	Arena Skövde, Skövde; Attendance: 1,525; Referees: Canbro, Claesson (SWE)
24 January; 20:30	Abdelwares 6	(11–12)	Park Jung Geu 7	Arena Skövde, Skövde; Attendance: 1,525; Referees: Canbro, Claesson (SWE)
24 January; 20:30	3× (yellow card) 5× (suspension) 1× (red card)	Report	3× (yellow card) 4× (suspension)	Arena Skövde, Skövde; Attendance: 1,525; Referees: Canbro, Claesson (SWE)

== Placement matches ==
=== 11th-place match ===
27 January
18:00
Germany
40–35 (ET)
Argentina
Kristianstad Arena, Kristianstad
Referees: Canbro, Claesson (SWE)
Glandorf, Gensheimer 9
(13–12)
Simonet 7
4× (yellow card) 13× (suspension) 2× (red card)
Report
4× (yellow card) 8× (suspension) 1× (red card)

FT: 27–27 ET: 4–4, 9–4

=== 9th-place match ===
27 January
20:30
Norway
32–31 (ET)
Serbia
Kristianstad Arena, Kristianstad
Attendance: 2,141
Referees: Al-Marzouqi, Al-Nuaimi (UAE)
Tvedten 9
(14–16)
Ilić 7
3× (yellow card) 1× (suspension)
Report
3× (yellow card) 4× (suspension)

FT: 29–29 ET: 3–2

=== 7th-place match ===
28 January; 18:00	Hungary	31–28	Poland	Kristianstad Arena, Kristianstad; Referees: Lazaar, Reveret (FRA)
28 January; 18:00	Iváncsik 11	(16–14)	Jurecki 6	Kristianstad Arena, Kristianstad; Referees: Lazaar, Reveret (FRA)
28 January; 18:00	3× (yellow card) 7× (suspension)	Report	3× (yellow card) 3× (suspension)	Kristianstad Arena, Kristianstad; Referees: Lazaar, Reveret (FRA)

=== 5th-place match ===
28 January; 20:30	Iceland	33–34	Croatia	Malmö Arena, Malmö; Attendance: 7,436; Referees: Stark, Ştefan (ROU)
28 January; 20:30	Sigurðsson 10	(16–14)	Buntić 9	Malmö Arena, Malmö; Attendance: 7,436; Referees: Stark, Ştefan (ROU)
28 January; 20:30	3× (yellow card) 4× (suspension)	Report	3× (yellow card) 4× (suspension)	Malmö Arena, Malmö; Attendance: 7,436; Referees: Stark, Ştefan (ROU)

== Final round (Kristianstad/Malmö) ==
Semi-finals
28 January – 18:00 (Malmö)
France	29
Sweden	26
28 January – 20:30 (Kristianstad)
Denmark	28
Spain	24

Final
30 January – 17:00 (Malmö)
France	37
Denmark	35
Bronze Match
30 January – 14:30 (Malmö)
Sweden	23
Spain	24

=== Semifinals ===
28 January; 18:00	France	29–26	Sweden	Malmö Arena, Malmö; Attendance: 11,477; Referees: Geipel, Helbig (GER)
28 January; 18:00	B. Gille, Guigou 8	(15–12)	Källman 6	Malmö Arena, Malmö; Attendance: 11,477; Referees: Geipel, Helbig (GER)
28 January; 18:00	3× (yellow card) 4× (suspension)	Report	4× (yellow card) 4× (suspension)	Malmö Arena, Malmö; Attendance: 11,477; Referees: Geipel, Helbig (GER)

28 January; 20:30	Denmark	28–24	Spain	Kristianstad Arena, Kristianstad; Attendance: 4,234; Referees: Horáček, Novotný (CZE)
28 January; 20:30	Hansen 9	(12–12)	Cañellas 6	Kristianstad Arena, Kristianstad; Attendance: 4,234; Referees: Horáček, Novotný (CZE)
28 January; 20:30	3× (yellow card) 2× (suspension)	Report	3× (yellow card) 3× (suspension)	Kristianstad Arena, Kristianstad; Attendance: 4,234; Referees: Horáček, Novotný (CZE)

=== Bronze match ===
30 January; 14:30	Sweden	23–24	Spain	Malmö Arena, Malmö; Attendance: 12,145; Referees: Krstič, Ljubič (SLO)
30 January; 14:30	Källman 6	(11–11)	Aguinagalde, Gurbindo, Romero 4	Malmö Arena, Malmö; Attendance: 12,145; Referees: Krstič, Ljubič (SLO)
30 January; 14:30	4× (yellow card) 5× (suspension)	Report	2× (yellow card) 4× (suspension)	Malmö Arena, Malmö; Attendance: 12,145; Referees: Krstič, Ljubič (SLO)

=== Final ===
30 January
17:00
France
37–35 (ET)
Denmark
Malmö Arena, Malmö
Attendance: 12,462
Referees: López, Ramírez (ESP)
N. Karabatić 10
(15–12)
Hansen 10
4× (yellow card) 4× (suspension)
Report
4× (yellow card) 5× (suspension)

FT: 31–31 ET: 6–4

The final was played at a sold-out Malmö Arena in Malmö between France and Denmark, and was followed by 12,462 spectators. In addition, the match was aired on both major Danish public television channels DR1 and TV 2 with 2,670,000 viewers, making it the most watched sport event in Denmark ever.

==== First half ====
The French team started the match with a 2–0 lead, and maintained a lead until the 17th minute, where Denmark started a 3–0 run and equalised at 9–9 with a penalty shot by Anders Eggert. On the next attack, Mikkel Hansen received the Danes' first two-minute suspension, allowing France to open another three-goal lead. The half time score was 15–12 in favor of France.

==== Second half ====
The second half started with France maintaining a lead of at least two goals in the first 15 minutes. But a couple of saves in a row by the well-tempered Niklas Landin Jacobsen, meant that Mikkel Hansen could equalise to 24–24 with 11 minutes to play. Still, France took the lead once again, but with five minutes remaining and the French lead at 29–27, Jérôme Fernandez was penalized with a 2-minute suspension. Denmark took advantage, scoring two goals and making it 29–29 with 3:30 remaining. In the last minute, the French found themselves one goal ahead, 31–30. The Danish coach Ulrik Wilbek used a team timeout with 25 seconds to go to prepare the team for the last attack. Three seconds were left, when the Dane Bo Spellerberg scored from left back a positional shot in the bottom of the goal for 31–31, deferring the match to overtime.

==== Overtime ====
In the 64th minute, the Danes recorded their first lead in the match when scoring 33–32, but within the next minute the French scored two goals overturning the result. The first half of the overtime ended with a French lead of 34–33.

The second half of overtime began with veteran Lars Christiansen scoring a penalty and evening the score at 34–34. The French took the lead from there, though, and secured the win at 36–34 when Thierry Omeyer saved a Mikkel Hansen 9m shot with just over one minute to go. Michael Guigou scored the last goal of the game with one second to go to the final score 37–35. The match ended 37–35 in favor of France. Nikola Karabatić and Mikkel Hansen, both scored 10 goals in the final, with Karabatić chosen the MVP of the championship, and Hansen the best goalscorer.

== Ranking and statistics ==
=== Final ranking ===
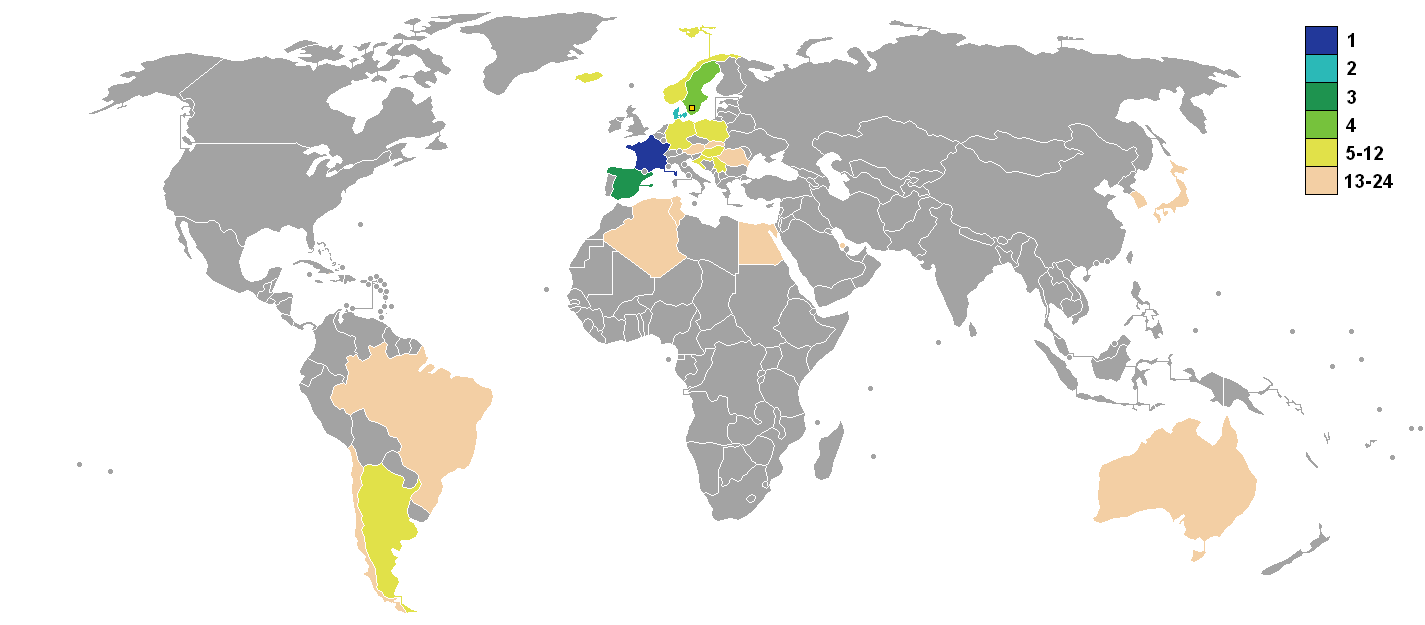
Champion Runner-up / Third place Fourth place / Placement matches (5th–12th) Placement matches (13th–24th)

Rank	Team
Gold medal	France
Silver medal	Denmark
Bronze medal	Spain
4	Sweden
5	Croatia
6	Iceland
7	Hungary
8	Poland
9	Norway
10	Serbia
11	Germany
12	Argentina
13	South Korea
14	Egypt
15	Algeria
16	Japan
17	Slovakia
18	Austria
19	Romania
20	Tunisia
21	Brazil
22	Chile
23	Bahrain
24	Australia

Qualified for the 2012 Summer Olympics
Qualified for the Olympic Qualification Tournament

=== Top goalkeepers ===
Rank	Name	Team	%	Saves	Shots
1	Daouda Karaboué	France	47.5%	56	118
2	Johan Sjöstrand	Sweden	41.5%	108	260
3	Johannes Bitter	Germany	41.0%	96	234
4	Ole Erevik	Norway	40.4%	69	171
5	Niklas Landin Jacobsen	Denmark	39.5%	121	306
6	Lee Chang-Woo	South Korea	39.1%	45	115
7	Park Chan-Young	South Korea	38.4%	58	151
8	Nándor Fazekas	Hungary	38.2%	92	241
9	Abdelmalek Slahdji	Algeria	37.7%	81	215
10	Thierry Omeyer	France	37.5%	110	293

Minimum 20% of total shots received by team. Source: Hego official statistics

=== Top goalscorers ===
Rank	Name	Team	Goals	Shots	%
1	Mikkel Hansen	Denmark	68	121	56%
2	Håvard Tvedten	Norway	56	86	64%
2	Marko Vujin	Serbia	56	114	49%
4	Vedran Zrnić	Croatia	54	71	76%
4	Bjarte Myrhol	Norway	54	71	76%
6	Alexander Petersson	Iceland	53	88	60%
7	Nikola Karabatić	France	51	80	64%
8	Tomasz Tłuczyński	Poland	47	60	78%
8	Guðjón Valur Sigurðsson	Iceland	47	69	68%
10	Niclas Ekberg	Sweden	43	67	64%

Source: Hego official statistics

2011 Men's World Champions

France
Fourth title

Team roster

Jérôme Fernandez, Didier Dinart, Xavier Barachet, Bertrand Gille, Guillaume Joli, Samuel Honrubia, Daouda Karaboué, Nikola Karabatić, Franck Junillon, Thierry Omeyer, William Accambray, Luc Abalo, Cédric Sorhaindo, Michaël Guigou, Bertrand Roine, Sébastien Bosquet, and Arnaud Bingo.
Head coach: Claude Onesta.

=== All Star Team ===
- Goalkeeper: Thierry Omeyer (FRA)
- Left wing: Håvard Tvedten (NOR)
- Left back: Mikkel Hansen (DEN)
- Pivot: Bertrand Gille (FRA)
- Centre back: Dalibor Doder (SWE)
- Right back: Alexander Petersson (ISL)
- Right wing: Vedran Zrnic (CRO)

Chosen by team officials and IHF experts: IHF.info

=== Other awards ===
- Most Valuable Player: Nikola Karabatić (FRA)

== IHF broadcasting rights ==
- Argentina: TyC Sports
- Austria: ORF Sport Plus
- Brazil: TV Esporte Interativo, BandSports
- Croatia: HRT, ArenaSport
- Czech Republic: Sport 1
- Denmark: TV 2, DR
- El Salvador: Sport 1
- France: Canal +
- Germany: ARD, ZDF, SPORT1
- Hungary: Sport 1
- South Korea: KBS N
- Iceland: Stöð 2 Sport
- Norway: TV 2
- Poland: TVP
- Portugal: SportTV
- Qatar, Middle East and North Africa: Al Jazeera Sports
- Romania: DolceSport
- Russia: NTV Plus Sport
- Serbia: Radio Television of Serbia, Arena Sport
- Slovenia: Šport TV
- Spain: TVE, Canal+
- Sweden: TV4
