= Tengbomgruppen =

Swedish architectural company

- Industry: Architecture
- Founded: 1906
- Number of locations: Stockholm (Sweden)
- Area served: Sweden
- Services: Sports, events, conference and exhibition centre architecture; Interior design; Environmental Branding; Landscape Architecture
- Website: Tengbomgruppen

Tengbom is one of Europe's oldest architectural companies and one of the largest in the Nordic countries. The firm is headquartered in Stockholm, Sweden.

== History ==
The architect firm Tengbom & Torulf was founded in 1906 by Swedish architects Ernst Torsten Torulf (1872-1936) and Ivar Tengbom (1878–1968). In 1932, Anders Tengbom (1911-2009) entered the company and later took over the business.

The current group was formed in 1988 under the name Tengbomgruppen - since 2006 named Tengbom. Until 2006 the business was conducted through a dozen separate companies with different brands and with Tengbomgruppen AB as parent and umbrella. Tengbom today is a company with offices in Borås, Göteborg, Halmstad, Helsingborg, Jonkoping, Kalmar, Karlstad, Linköping, Malmö, Stockholm and Uppsala. Tengbom operates in five business areas (urban design, landscape architecture, architecture, interior design and project management) and is actively working on projects related to sustainable development, both nationally and internationally.

== Gallery ==
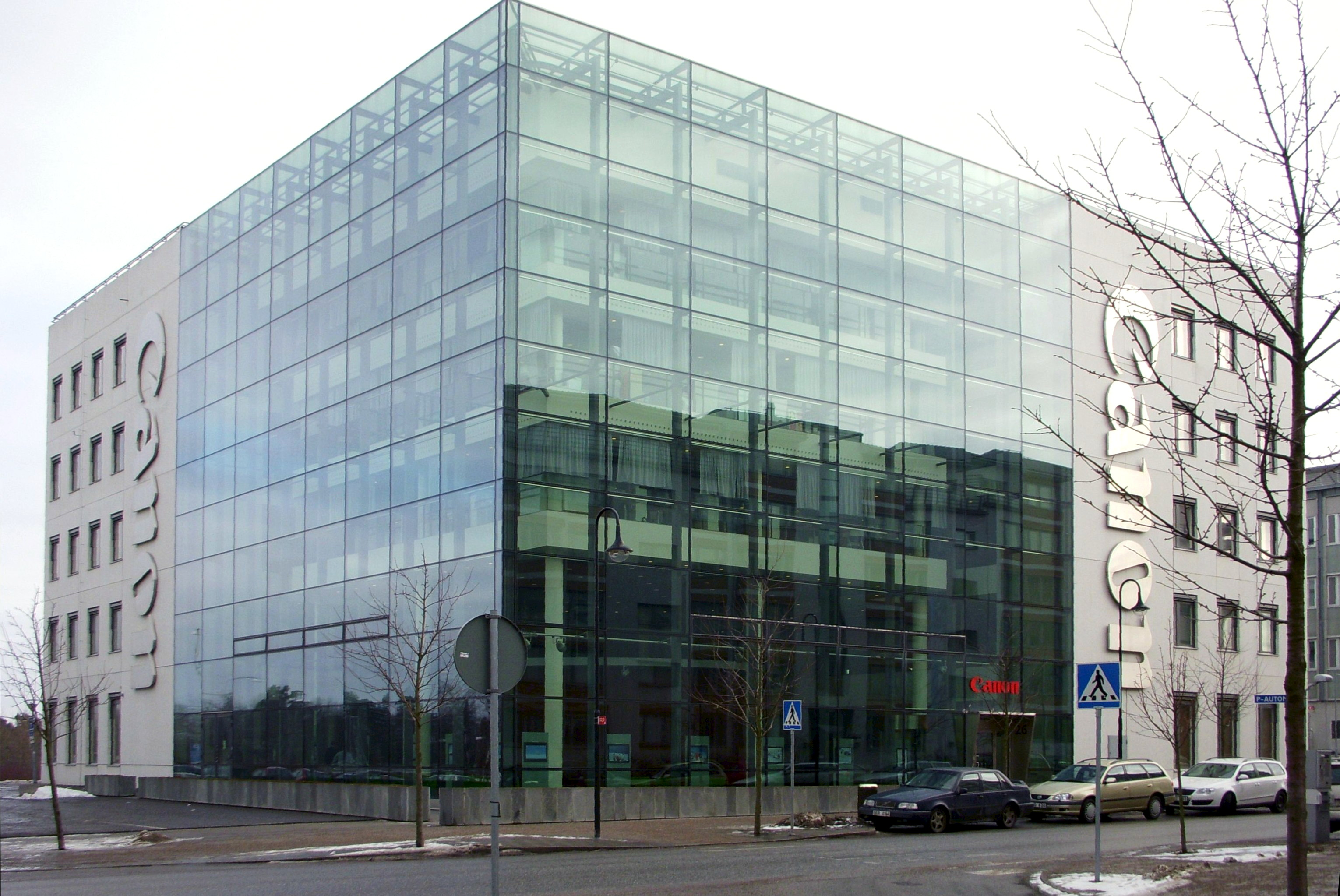
Canon, Stockholm

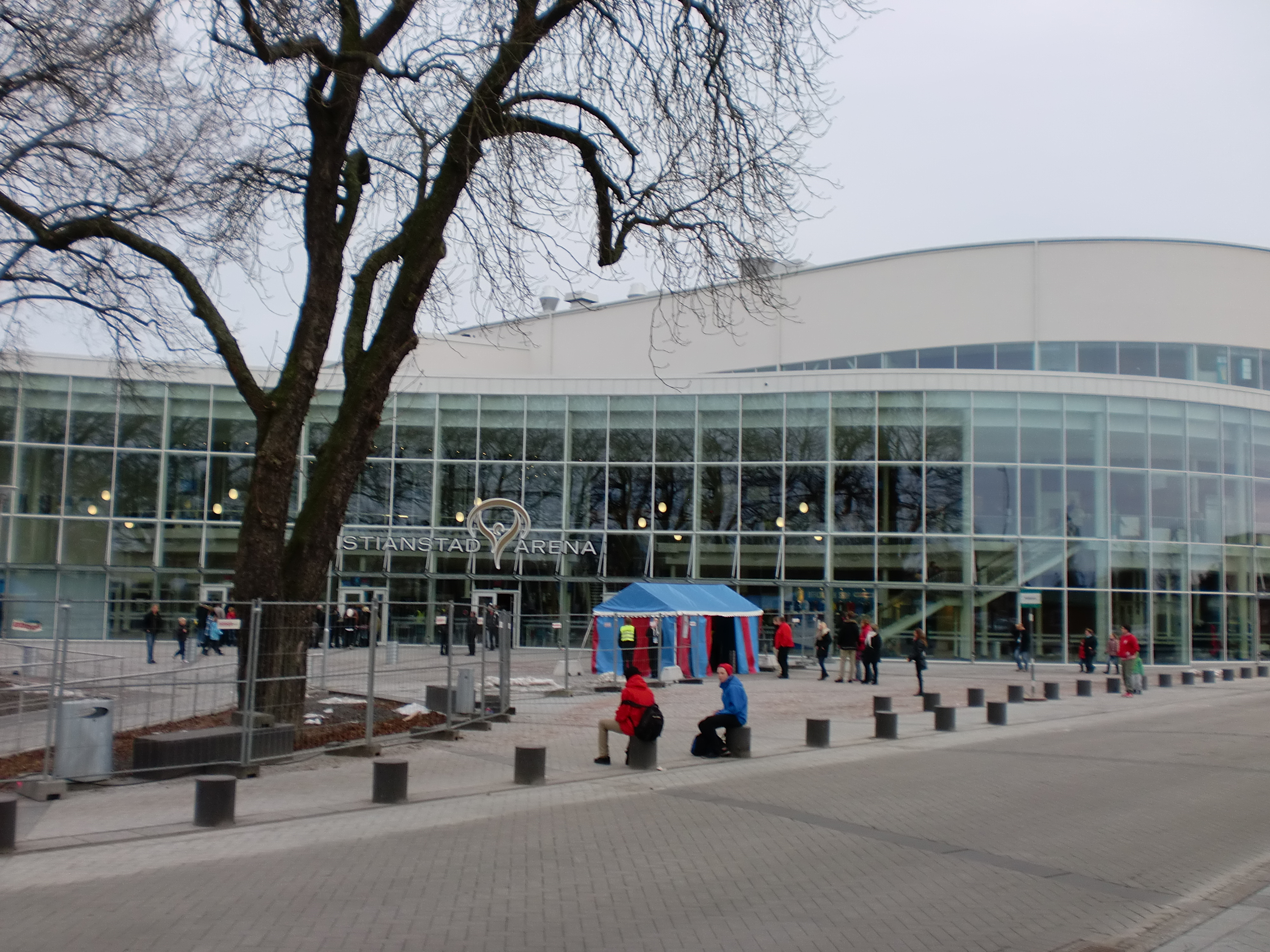
Kristianstad Arena
