= Sassi Boultif =

Algerian handball player (born 1983)

Personal information
- Nationality: Algerian
- Born: 9 January 1983 (age 43) El Milia, Algeria
- Height: 1.94 m (6 ft 4 in)

Sport
- Sport: Handball
- Position: Left back

Senior clubs
- Years: Team
- 2001-2003: SC Sélestat
- 2003-2006: Villefranche-en-Beaujolais
- 2007-2008: SD Octavio Vigo
- 2008-2012: Istres Provence Handball
- 2012-2013: Cesson Rennes MHB
- 2013-2016: Al-Nasr
- 2016-2017: Al-Rayyan SC
- 2017-2019: Tremblay-en-France
- 2019-2021: Valence Handball
National team
Years	Team	Apps	(Gls)
–	Algeria	115	(205)

Sassi Boultif (born 9 January 1983) is an Algerian handball former player.

He competed for the Algerian national team at the 2015 World Men's Handball Championship in Qatar.

He also participated at the 2009, 2011 and 2013 World Championships.

He played most of his club handball in France, but also played for SD Octavio Vigo in Spain, Al-Nasr in Dubai and Al-Rayyan SC in Bahrain. He retired in 2021 while playing for Valence Handball
