= Kristianstad Arena =

Indoor arena in Kristianstad, Sweden

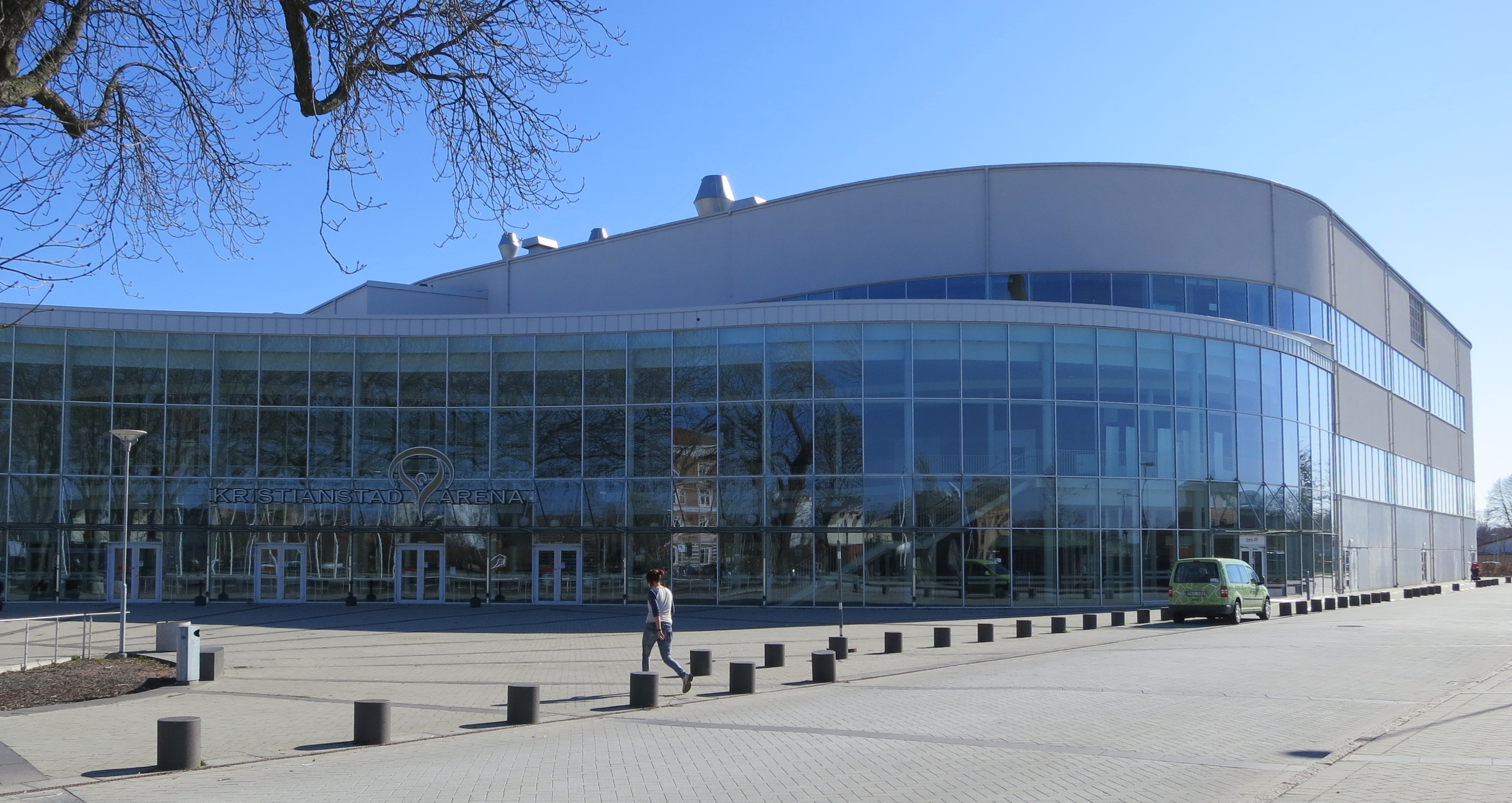
- Interactive map of Kristianstad Arena
- Location: Kristianstad, Sweden
- Coordinates: 56°01′46″N 14°09′24″E
- Operator: Kristianstad Municipality
- Capacity: 4,700

Construction
- Groundbreaking: 26 February 2009
- Opened: 15 October 2010
- Cost: SEK 337 million EUR € 38 million
- Architect: Tengbomgruppen

Tenant
- IFK Kristianstad (handball) (2010–present)

Kristianstad Arena is a hall for handball matches and public events in Kristianstad, Sweden. It has a capacity for 4,700 spectators for sport events and 5,000 for concerts. It's the home venue for the Swedish handball team IFK Kristianstad and it hosted matches during the 2011 and 2023 World Men's Handball Championship and the 2026 European Men's Handball Championship .

== See also ==
- List of indoor arenas in Sweden
