= Messaoud Layadi =

Algerian handball player (born 1982)

Personal information
- Nationality: Algerian
- Born: 24 March 1982 (age 44)
- Height: 1.90 m (6 ft 3 in)

Sport
- Sport: Handball
- Position: Right wing
- Current club: Retired
National team
Years	Team	Apps	(Gls)
2007-2015	Algeria	24	(60)

Messaoud Layadi (born 24 March 1982) is an Algerian handball player for GS Pétroliers.

He competed for the Algerian national team at the 2015 World Men's Handball Championship in Qatar.

He also participated at the 2009 and 2011 World Championships.
