= Sparbanken Skåne Arena =

Arena in Lund, Sweden

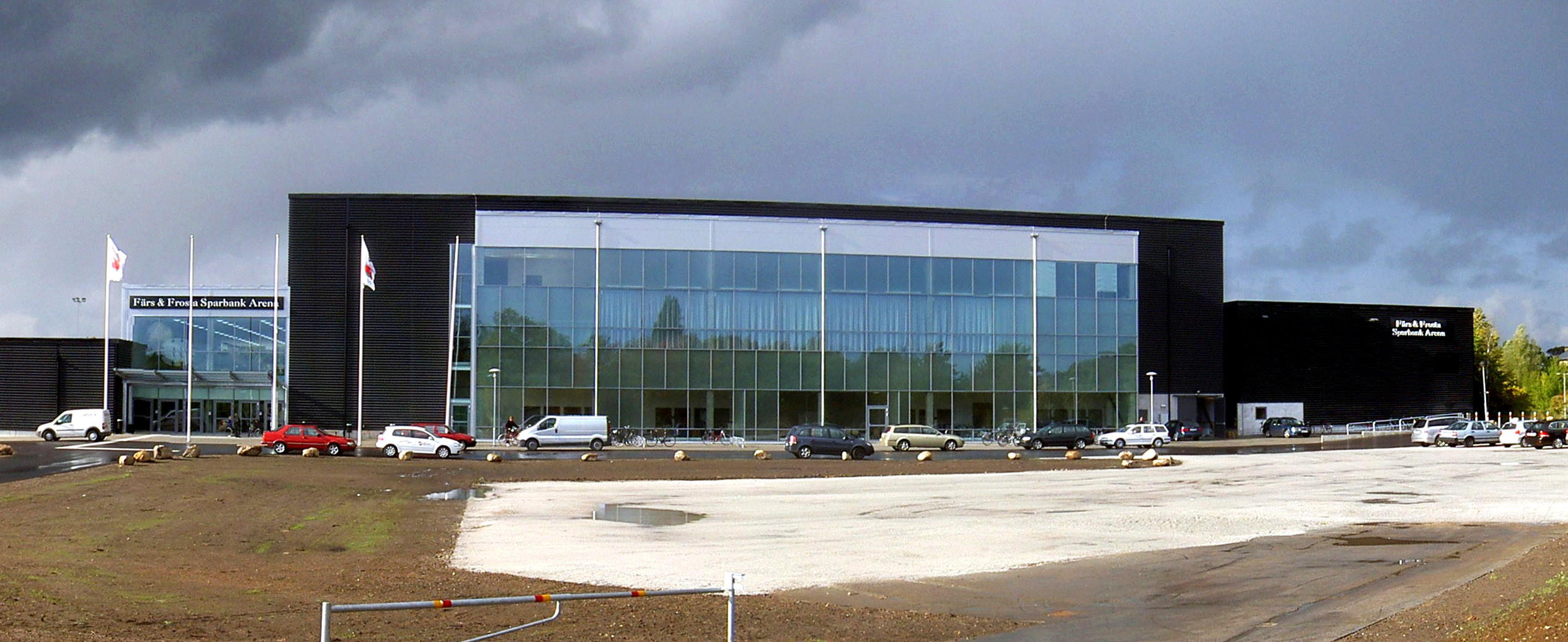
- Interactive map of Sparbanken Skåne Arena
- Location: Lund, Sweden
- Coordinates: 55°41′50″N 13°10′48″E
- Operator: Lunds kommun
- Capacity: 3,000

Construction
- Groundbreaking: 2 April 2007
- Opened: 19 September 2008
- Cost: SEK 185 million EUR € 21 million
- Architect: Sydark Arkitekter AB

Sparbanken Skåne Arena is a hall for handball matches and public events in Lund, Sweden. It has a capacity for 3,000 spectators during sport events. It is the home venue for the Swedish handball teams LUGI HF and H 43 Lund and it also hosted matches from the 2011 World Men's Handball Championship. The arena also hosts the biggest LAN party in Scania twice a year.

Until 2014 the building was known as Färs och Frosta Sparbanken Arena or FFS Arena for short. It was renamed following the merger of Färs och Frosta Sparbank into Sparbanken Skåne.
