= Vedran Zrnić =

Croatian handball player (born 1979)

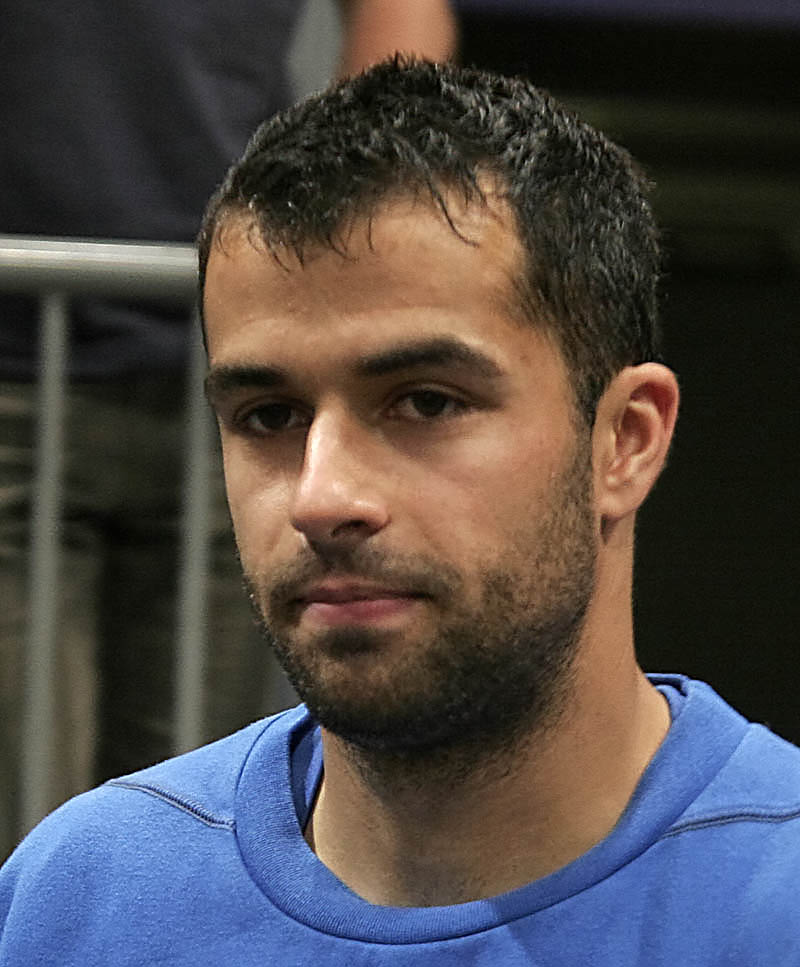

Personal information
- Full name: Vedran Zrnić
- Nationality: Croatian
- Born: 26 September 1979 (age 47) Zagreb, SR Croatia, SFR Yugoslavia
- Height: 1.88 m (6 ft 2 in)

Sport
- Sport: Handball
- Position: Right wing

Senior clubs
- Years: Team
- 1996–2001: Badel 1862 Zagreb
- 2001–2004: Prule 67
- 2004–2006: Gorenje Velenje
- 2006–2013: VfL Gummersbach
- 2013–2014: Wisła Płock
- 2014–2015: Beşiktaş
- 2015–2019: Nexe Našice
National team
| Years | Team | Apps | (Gls) |
| 1999–2010 | Croatia | 189 | (570) |
Medal record
Men's handball
Representing Croatia
Olympic Games
| Gold medal – first place | 2004 Athens | Team |
World Championship
| Gold medal – first place | 2003 Portugal | Team |
| Silver medal – second place | 2005 Tunisia | Team |
| Silver medal – second place | 2009 Croatia | Team |
Statoil World Cup
| Gold medal – first place | 2006 Sweden & Germany | Team |
European Championship
| Silver medal – second place | 2010 Austria | Team |
Mediterranean Games
| Gold medal – first place | 2001 Tunis | Team |
Super Cup
| Silver medal – second place | 1999 Germany | Team |

Vedran Zrnić (born 26 September 1979) is a Croatian former professional handball player. He is World champion from 2003, and Olympic champion from 2004 with the Croatia national team. He received a silver medal at the 2005 World championship.

He was born in Zagreb, on 26 September 1979.

== Honours ==
Badel 1862 Zagreb

- Croatian First League (5): 1996–97, 1997–98, 1998–99, 1999–00, 2000–01
- Croatian Cup (4): 1997, 1998, 1999, 2000
- EHF Champions League runner-up (3): 1997, 1998, 1999

Prule 67 Ljubljana

- Slovenian First League (1): 2001–02
- Slovenian Cup (1): 2002

Gorenje Velenje

- Slovenian First League runner-up (1): 2004–05

VfL Gummersbach

- EHF Cup Winners' Cup (1): 2010, 2011
- EHF Cup (1): 2009
- EHF Champions Trophy runner-up (1): 2006

Beşiktaş

- Turkish Super League (1): 2014–15
- Turkish Cup (1): 2015
- Turkish President's Cup (1): 2014

Individual

- Franjo Bučar State Award for Sport - 2004
- 3rd top goalscorer of Croatian national team

== Orders ==
- Order of Danica Hrvatska with face of Franjo Bučar - 2004
